= 2024 International Bernese Ladies Cup =

World Curling Tour event

- Host city: Bern, Switzerland
- Arena: Curling Bern
- Dates: January 25–28
- Winner: (South Korea) Team Gim
- Curling club: Uijeongbu CC, Uijeongbu
- Skip: Gim Eun-ji
- Third: Kim Min-ji
- Second: Seol Ye-ji
- Lead: Seol Ye-eun
- Alternate: Kim Su-ji
- Coach: Shin Dong-ho
- Finalist: (South Korea) Kim Eun-jung

The 2024 International Bernese Ladies Cup was held from January 25 to 28 at Curling Bern in Bern, Switzerland as part of the World Curling Tour. The event was held in a round-robin format with a purse of 20,000 CHF.

In an all Korean final, Gyeonggi Province (Gim Eun-ji) defeated Gangneung City Hall (Kim Eun-jung) 8–2 in a rematch of the 2023 Korean Curling Championships final, which Gyeonggi also won. Gim, with teammates Kim Min-ji, Seol Ye-ji, Seol Ye-eun and Kim Su-ji got off to a strong start with two in the first end followed by steals of two in the second and one in the third for a 5–0 lead. Kim got two back in the fourth to close the gap before Gim counted three more in the sixth to secure the victory. To reach the final, Gyeonggi Province finished 4–1 through the round robin before playoff victories over Isabella Wranå (quarters) and Xenia Schwaller (semis). Gangneung City Hall also went 4–1 in the preliminary round before defeating Moa Dryburgh and Corrie Hürlimann in their quarterfinal and semifinal matches. Silvana Tirinzoni and Michèle Jäggi rounded out the playoff field.

== Teams ==
The teams are listed as follows:

Skip	Third	Second	Lead	Alternate	Locale
Emira Abbes (Fourth)	Mia Höhne (Skip)	Lena Kapp	Maike Beer		Füssen, Germany
Kathrine Blackham	Jana Hoffmann	Johanna Blackham	Anika Meier		Basel, Switzerland
Stefania Constantini	Elena Mathis	Angela Romei	Marta Lo Deserto	Giulia Zardini Lacedelli	Cortina d'Ampezzo, Italy
Moa Dryburgh	Thea Orefjord	Moa Tjärnlund	Moa Nilsson		Sundbyberg, Sweden
Gim Eun-ji	Kim Min-ji	Seol Ye-ji (Note: Alternate Seol Ye-ji played second, replacing Kim Su-ji.)	Seol Ye-eun	Kim Su-ji	Uijeongbu, South Korea
Fay Henderson	Hailey Duff	Amy MacDonald	Katie McMillan		Stirling, Scotland
Roxane Héritier	Melina Bezzola	Anna Gut	Nadine Bärtschiger		Luzern, Switzerland
Corrie Hürlimann	Celine Schwizgebel	Sarah Müller	Marina Lörtscher	Briar Schwaller-Hürlimann	Zug, Switzerland
Michèle Jäggi	Irene Schori (Note: Irene Schori spared for Team Jäggi who only had three players.)	Stefanie Berset	Lisa Muhmenthaler		Bern, Switzerland
Erika Tuvike (Fourth) (Note: With skip Marie Kaldvee absent, the team shuffled their lineup.)	Kerli Laidsalu	Liisa Turmann (Skip)	Heili Grossmann		Tallinn, Estonia
Kim Eun-jung	Kim Kyeong-ae	Kim Cho-hi	Kim Seon-yeong	Kim Yeong-mi	Gangneung, South Korea
Alžběta Zelingrová (Note: Alžběta Zelingrová spared for Anna Kubešková.)	Michaela Baudyšová	Karolína Špundová	Aneta Müllerová	Klára Svatoňová	Prague, Czech Republic
Kim Sutor (Fourth)	Sara Messenzehl (Skip)	Zoé Antes	– (Note: Team Messenzehl played with three players as fourth Joy Sutor was in South Korea competing in the 2024 Winter Youth Olympics. Lead Kim Sutor moved up to throw fourth rocks.)		Füssen, Germany
Ariane Oberson	Laurane Flückiger	Noa Kusano	Lia Germann	Enya Caccivio	Bern, Switzerland
Verena Pflügler	Hannah Augustin	Johanna Hoess	Julia Kotek		Kitzbühel, Austria
Xenia Schwaller	Selina Gafner	Fabienne Rieder	Selina Rychiger	Marion Wüest	Zurich, Switzerland
Alina Pätz (Fourth)	Silvana Tirinzoni (Skip)	Selina Witschonke	Carole Howald		Aarau, Switzerland
Isabella Wranå	Almida de Val	Maria Larsson	Linda Stenlund		Sundbyberg, Sweden

== Round robin standings ==
Final Round Robin Standings

Key
Teams to Playoffs

Pool A	W	L	PF	PA	SO
(Switzerland) Silvana Tirinzoni	5	0	41	18	12
(Sweden) Moa Dryburgh	3	2	29	23	3
(Switzerland) Xenia Schwaller	3	2	28	20	9
(Scotland) Fay Henderson	3	2	32	25	17
(Estonia) Team Kaldvee	1	4	23	33	13
(Switzerland) Ariane Oberson	0	5	10	44	5

Pool B	W	L	PF	PA	SO
(Switzerland) Corrie Hürlimann	4	1	36	23	2
(South Korea) Gim Eun-ji	4	1	30	18	11
(Switzerland) Roxane Héritier	3	2	31	26	14
(Italy) Stefania Constantini	2	3	25	24	15
(Germany) Team Abbes	2	3	20	23	1
(Austria) Verena Pflügler	0	5	13	41	6

Pool C	W	L	PF	PA	SO
(Sweden) Isabella Wranå	4	1	32	18	10
(South Korea) Kim Eun-jung	4	1	31	23	7
(Switzerland) Michèle Jäggi	3	2	27	24	4
(Czech Republic) Team Kubešková	2	3	22	23	8
(Germany) Sara Messenzehl	2	3	32	26	16
(Switzerland) Kathrine Blackham	0	5	13	43	18

== Round robin results ==
All draw times listed in Central European Time (UTC+01:00).

=== Draw 1 ===
Thursday, January 25, 6:00 pm

Sheet 1	1	2	3	4	5	6	7	8	Final
(Switzerland) Corrie Hürlimann	1	0	0	0	0	1	2	1	5
(Germany) Team Abbes	0	0	0	0	1	0	0	0	1

Sheet 2	1	2	3	4	5	6	7	8	Final
(Switzerland) Michèle Jäggi	0	0	1	1	0	1	0	1	4
(Czech Republic) Team Kubešková	0	1	0	0	0	0	1	0	2

Sheet 3	1	2	3	4	5	6	7	8	Final
(Switzerland) Xenia Schwaller	0	2	0	3	0	0	2	0	7
(Estonia) Team Kaldvee	0	0	1	0	2	1	0	0	4

Sheet 4	1	2	3	4	5	6	7	8	Final
(Switzerland) Silvana Tirinzoni	1	0	4	1	2	4	X	X	12
(Switzerland) Ariane Oberson	0	2	0	0	0	0	X	X	2

Sheet 5	1	2	3	4	5	6	7	8	Final
(Italy) Stefania Constantini	0	0	1	1	0	0	1	0	3
(Switzerland) Roxane Héritier	1	1	0	0	1	1	0	3	7

Sheet 6	1	2	3	4	5	6	7	8	Final
(South Korea) Kim Eun-jung	2	0	0	0	3	0	0	2	7
(Germany) Sara Messenzehl	0	0	1	3	0	2	0	0	6

Sheet 7	1	2	3	4	5	6	7	8	Final
(South Korea) Gim Eun-ji	1	0	1	2	1	4	X	X	9
(Austria) Verena Pflügler	0	1	0	0	0	0	X	X	1

Sheet 8	1	2	3	4	5	6	7	8	Final
(Sweden) Moa Dryburgh	1	0	2	0	1	1	0	0	5
(Scotland) Fay Henderson	0	1	0	2	0	0	2	1	6

=== Draw 2 ===
Friday, January 26, 9:00 am

Sheet 1	1	2	3	4	5	6	7	8	Final
(Sweden) Isabella Wranå	2	2	3	1	3	0	X	X	11
(Switzerland) Kathrine Blackham	0	0	0	0	0	2	X	X	2

Sheet 2	1	2	3	4	5	6	7	8	Final
(Sweden) Moa Dryburgh	1	0	0	1	0	4	0	X	6
(Switzerland) Ariane Oberson	0	0	1	0	1	0	1	X	3

Sheet 3	1	2	3	4	5	6	7	8	Final
(Czech Republic) Team Kubešková	1	1	1	0	1	0	3	X	7
(Germany) Sara Messenzehl	0	0	0	2	0	2	0	X	4

Sheet 4	1	2	3	4	5	6	7	8	Final
(South Korea) Gim Eun-ji	0	1	1	1	0	1	0	1	5
(Italy) Stefania Constantini	0	0	0	0	1	0	2	0	3

Sheet 5	1	2	3	4	5	6	7	8	Final
(Switzerland) Xenia Schwaller	2	1	0	1	0	0	0	2	6
(Scotland) Fay Henderson	0	0	2	0	1	1	0	0	4

Sheet 6	1	2	3	4	5	6	7	8	Final
(Germany) Team Abbes	2	1	0	1	0	0	3	X	7
(Austria) Verena Pflügler	0	0	1	0	0	1	0	X	2

Sheet 7	1	2	3	4	5	6	7	8	Final
(Switzerland) Silvana Tirinzoni	0	3	1	1	0	0	3	X	8
(Estonia) Team Kaldvee	1	0	0	0	1	0	0	X	2

Sheet 8	1	2	3	4	5	6	7	8	9	Final
(Switzerland) Corrie Hürlimann	2	1	0	2	0	3	0	0	0	8
(Switzerland) Roxane Héritier	0	0	1	0	3	0	3	1	1	9

=== Draw 3 ===
Friday, January 26, 2:00 pm

Sheet 1	1	2	3	4	5	6	7	8	Final
(Switzerland) Michèle Jäggi	1	0	1	0	3	0	2	X	7
(Germany) Sara Messenzehl	0	0	0	2	0	2	0	X	4

Sheet 2	1	2	3	4	5	6	7	8	Final
(Sweden) Isabella Wranå	0	0	2	1	1	2	0	X	6
(South Korea) Kim Eun-jung	0	2	0	0	0	0	1	X	3

Sheet 3	1	2	3	4	5	6	7	8	Final
(Italy) Stefania Constantini	1	0	3	1	0	0	X	X	5
(Germany) Team Abbes	0	0	0	0	1	1	X	X	2

Sheet 4	1	2	3	4	5	6	7	8	Final
(Sweden) Moa Dryburgh	0	3	2	0	2	2	X	X	9
(Estonia) Team Kaldvee	1	0	0	2	0	0	X	X	3

Sheet 5	1	2	3	4	5	6	7	8	Final
(Czech Republic) Team Kubešková	0	0	0	2	1	0	2	2	7
(Switzerland) Kathrine Blackham	1	0	1	0	0	2	0	0	4

Sheet 6	1	2	3	4	5	6	7	8	Final
(South Korea) Gim Eun-ji	2	0	0	1	0	2	0	0	5
(Switzerland) Corrie Hürlimann	0	3	0	0	1	0	2	1	7

Sheet 7	1	2	3	4	5	6	7	8	Final
(Scotland) Fay Henderson	0	0	2	1	3	0	4	X	10
(Switzerland) Ariane Oberson	0	1	0	0	0	1	0	X	2

=== Draw 4 ===
Friday, January 26, 7:00 pm

Sheet 3	1	2	3	4	5	6	7	8	Final
(South Korea) Kim Eun-jung	0	2	0	2	0	0	2	0	6
(Switzerland) Kathrine Blackham	0	0	1	0	0	1	0	1	3

Sheet 4	1	2	3	4	5	6	7	8	Final
(Sweden) Isabella Wranå	2	0	0	1	0	0	3	X	6
(Switzerland) Michèle Jäggi	0	1	0	0	1	1	0	X	3

Sheet 5	1	2	3	4	5	6	7	8	Final
(Switzerland) Silvana Tirinzoni	2	0	0	3	0	2	0	X	7
(Sweden) Moa Dryburgh	0	0	1	0	1	0	2	X	4

Sheet 6	1	2	3	4	5	6	7	8	Final
(Switzerland) Xenia Schwaller	1	0	1	0	2	2	X	X	6
(Switzerland) Ariane Oberson	0	0	0	1	0	0	X	X	1

Sheet 7	1	2	3	4	5	6	7	8	Final
(Germany) Team Abbes	1	0	2	0	2	1	0	1	7
(Switzerland) Roxane Héritier	0	2	0	3	0	0	0	0	5

Sheet 8	1	2	3	4	5	6	7	8	Final
(Italy) Stefania Constantini	0	1	0	1	3	0	4	X	9
(Austria) Verena Pflügler	1	0	2	0	0	1	0	X	4

=== Draw 5 ===
Saturday, January 27, 9:00 am

Sheet 1	1	2	3	4	5	6	7	8	9	Final
(Switzerland) Silvana Tirinzoni	0	1	0	0	2	0	2	0	1	6
(Switzerland) Xenia Schwaller	1	0	1	0	0	2	0	1	0	5

Sheet 2	1	2	3	4	5	6	7	8	Final
(Italy) Stefania Constantini	0	2	0	1	0	0	1	1	5
(Switzerland) Corrie Hürlimann	0	0	4	0	2	0	0	0	6

Sheet 3	1	2	3	4	5	6	7	8	Final
(Switzerland) Roxane Héritier	1	1	3	0	1	0	0	0	6
(Austria) Verena Pflügler	0	0	0	2	0	0	1	0	3

Sheet 4	1	2	3	4	5	6	7	8	Final
(South Korea) Gim Eun-ji	1	0	0	1	1	0	3	X	6
(Germany) Team Abbes	0	0	1	0	0	2	0	X	3

Sheet 5	1	2	3	4	5	6	7	8	Final
(Sweden) Isabella Wranå	1	0	0	0	3	0	0	X	4
(Germany) Sara Messenzehl	0	2	0	4	0	1	1	X	8

Sheet 6	1	2	3	4	5	6	7	8	Final
(Scotland) Fay Henderson	0	2	0	2	1	1	1	X	7
(Estonia) Team Kaldvee	0	0	4	0	0	0	0	X	4

Sheet 7	1	2	3	4	5	6	7	8	Final
(Switzerland) Michèle Jäggi	1	0	3	0	3	2	X	X	9
(Switzerland) Kathrine Blackham	0	2	0	1	0	0	X	X	3

Sheet 8	1	2	3	4	5	6	7	8	Final
(South Korea) Kim Eun-jung	1	0	0	2	1	2	0	X	6
(Czech Republic) Team Kubešková	0	2	0	0	0	0	2	X	4

=== Draw 6 ===
Saturday, January 27, 2:00 pm

Sheet 1	1	2	3	4	5	6	7	8	Final
(South Korea) Gim Eun-ji	2	2	0	0	0	1	0	X	5
(Switzerland) Roxane Héritier	0	0	1	1	0	0	2	X	4

Sheet 2	1	2	3	4	5	6	7	8	Final
(Germany) Sara Messenzehl	0	0	1	3	1	0	5	X	10
(Switzerland) Kathrine Blackham	0	0	0	0	0	1	0	X	1

Sheet 3	1	2	3	4	5	6	7	8	Final
(Switzerland) Silvana Tirinzoni	0	2	0	2	1	0	3	0	8
(Scotland) Fay Henderson	2	0	1	0	0	1	0	1	5

Sheet 4	1	2	3	4	5	6	7	8	Final
(Switzerland) Corrie Hürlimann	0	1	0	6	1	2	X	X	10
(Austria) Verena Pflügler	1	0	2	0	0	0	X	X	3

Sheet 5	1	2	3	4	5	6	7	8	Final
(South Korea) Kim Eun-jung	2	2	0	1	0	3	1	X	9
(Switzerland) Michèle Jäggi	0	0	3	0	1	0	0	X	4

Sheet 6	1	2	3	4	5	6	7	8	Final
(Sweden) Isabella Wranå	0	1	1	1	0	1	1	X	5
(Czech Republic) Team Kubešková	1	0	0	0	1	0	0	X	2

Sheet 7	1	2	3	4	5	6	7	8	9	Final
(Switzerland) Xenia Schwaller	0	0	1	0	2	0	0	1	0	4
(Sweden) Moa Dryburgh	2	0	0	1	0	1	0	0	1	5

Sheet 8	1	2	3	4	5	6	7	8	Final
(Estonia) Team Kaldvee	0	3	0	5	2	X	X	X	10
(Switzerland) Ariane Oberson	1	0	1	0	0	X	X	X	2

== Playoffs ==
Quarterfinals
1	(Switzerland) Silvana Tirinzoni	3
8	(Switzerland) Xenia Schwaller	4
4	(Sweden) Isabella Wranå	5
5	(South Korea) Gim Eun-ji	7
3	(South Korea) Kim Eun-jung	6
6	(Sweden) Moa Dryburgh	2
2	(Switzerland) Corrie Hürlimann	6
7	(Switzerland) Michèle Jäggi	5

Semifinals
8	(Switzerland) Xenia Schwaller	4
5	(South Korea) Gim Eun-ji	5
3	(South Korea) Kim Eun-jung	5
2	(Switzerland) Corrie Hürlimann	2

Final
5	(South Korea) Gim Eun-ji	8
3	(South Korea) Kim Eun-jung	2

=== Quarterfinals ===
Saturday, January 27, 7:00 pm

Sheet 3	1	2	3	4	5	6	7	8	9	Final
(Sweden) Isabella Wranå	1	0	0	2	0	1	0	1	0	5
(South Korea) Gim Eun-ji	0	2	1	0	2	0	0	0	2	7

Sheet 4	1	2	3	4	5	6	7	8	Final
(South Korea) Kim Eun-jung	0	0	1	0	0	3	0	2	6
(Sweden) Moa Dryburgh	0	0	0	1	0	0	1	0	2

Sheet 5	1	2	3	4	5	6	7	8	Final
(Switzerland) Silvana Tirinzoni	0	1	0	1	0	0	1	0	3
(Switzerland) Xenia Schwaller	0	0	1	0	0	2	0	1	4

Sheet 6	1	2	3	4	5	6	7	8	9	Final
(Switzerland) Corrie Hürlimann	0	1	0	1	0	1	2	0	1	6
(Switzerland) Michèle Jäggi	0	0	2	0	1	0	0	2	0	5

=== Semifinals ===
Sunday, January 28, 9:00 am

Sheet 4	1	2	3	4	5	6	7	8	Final
(Switzerland) Xenia Schwaller	0	0	0	2	0	0	1	1	4
(South Korea) Gim Eun-ji	0	0	2	0	2	1	0	0	5

Sheet 5	1	2	3	4	5	6	7	8	Final
(South Korea) Kim Eun-jung	0	3	0	1	0	1	0	X	5
(Switzerland) Corrie Hürlimann	0	0	1	0	1	0	0	X	2

=== Final ===
Sunday, January 28, 1:30 pm

Sheet 5	1	2	3	4	5	6	7	8	Final
(South Korea) Gim Eun-ji	2	2	1	0	0	3	X	X	8
(South Korea) Kim Eun-jung	0	0	0	2	0	0	X	X	2
