= 2024 Women's Masters Basel =

- Host city: Arlesheim, Switzerland
- Arena: Curlingzentrum Region Basel
- Dates: September 20–22
- Winner: (Switzerland) Team Tirinzoni
- Curling club: CC Aarau, Aarau
- Skip: Silvana Tirinzoni
- Fourth: Alina Pätz
- Second: Selina Witschonke
- Lead: Carole Howald
- Coach: Pierre Charette
- Finalist: (Sweden) Anna Hasselborg

The 2024 Women's Masters Basel was held from September 20 to 22 at the Curlingzentrum Region Basel in Arlesheim, Switzerland. The event was held in a round robin format with a purse of 35,000 CHF. It was the first time the event is not held as part of the World Curling Tour.

== Teams ==
The teams are listed as follows:

Skip	Third	Second	Lead	Alternate	Locale
Torild Bjørnstad	Nora Østgård	Ingeborg Forbregd	Eirin Mesloe		Oppdal, Norway
Stefania Constantini	Elena Mathis	Angela Romei	Giulia Zardini Lacedelli	Marta Lo Deserto	Cortina d'Ampezzo, Italy
Madeleine Dupont	Mathilde Halse	Denise Dupont	My Larsen	Jasmin Holtermann	Hvidovre, Denmark
Anna Hasselborg	Sara McManus	Agnes Knochenhauer	Sofia Mabergs	Johanna Heldin	Sundbyberg, Sweden
Elina Arnold (Fourth)	Sophie Heinimann (Skip)	Lucia Nebbia	Julia Suter	Florence von Radowitz	Bern, Switzerland
Fay Henderson	Robyn Munro	Hailey Duff	Katie McMillan	Lisa Davie	Stirling, Scotland
Roxane Héritier	Melina Bezzola	Anna Gut	Nadine Bärtschiger		Luzern, Switzerland
Corrie Hürlimann	Celine Schwizgebel	Sarah Müller	Marina Lörtscher	Stefanie Berset	Zug, Switzerland
Linda Joó (Fourth)	Vera Kalocsai-van Dorp (Skip)	Orosolya Tóth-Csősz	Hanna Orbán	Laura Lauchsz	Budapest, Hungary
Zuzana Paulová (Note: Zuzana Paulová spared for Anna Kubešková.)	Alžběta Zelingrová	Michaela Baudyšová	Aneta Müllerová	Karolína Špundová	Prague, Czech Republic
Rebecca Mariani	Giorgia Maurino	Lucrezia Grande	Letizia Carlisano	Rachele Scalesse	Trentino, Italy
Ariane Oberson	Laurane Flückiger	Lia Germann	Enya Caccivio	Isabel Einspieler	Bern, Switzerland
Kristin Skaslien (Fourth)	Marianne Rørvik (Skip)	Mille Haslev Nordbye	Eilin Kjærland		Lillehammer, Norway
Xenia Schwaller	Selina Gafner	Fabienne Rieder	Selina Rychiger		Zurich, Switzerland
Zoe Schwaller	Jana Soltermann	Anikò Székely	Ladina Ramstein		Limmattal, Switzerland
Hana Synáčková	Linda Nemčoková	Zuzana Pražáková	Karolína Frederiksen	Martina Strnadová	Prague, Czech Republic
Alina Pätz (Fourth)	Silvana Tirinzoni (Skip)	Selina Witschonke	Carole Howald		Aarau, Switzerland
Erika Tuvike (Fourth)	Kerli Laidsalu	Liisa Turmann (Skip)	Heili Grossmann		Tallinn, Estonia
Laura Watt	Amy Mitchell	Holly Wilkie-Milne	Robyn Mitchell	Tamzin Smith	Stirling, Scotland
Isabella Wranå	Almida de Val	Maria Larsson	Linda Stenlund		Sundbyberg, Sweden

== Round robin standings ==
Final Round Robin Standings

Key
Teams to Playoffs

Pool A	W	L	PF	PA
(Switzerland) Silvana Tirinzoni	4	0	32	8
(Denmark) Madeleine Dupont	3	1	27	25
(Estonia) Liisa Turmann	2	2	22	23
(Switzerland) Corrie Hürlimann	1	3	25	24
(Hungary) Vera Kalocsai-van Dorp	0	4	12	38

Pool B	W	L	PF	PA
(Norway) Marianne Rørvik	4	0	27	10
(Sweden) Anna Hasselborg	3	1	24	12
(Scotland) Laura Watt	2	2	22	24
(Switzerland) Ariane Oberson	1	3	17	28
(Italy) Rebecca Mariani	0	4	13	29

Pool C	W	L	PF	PA
(Scotland) Fay Henderson	3	1	20	19
(Sweden) Isabella Wranå	3	1	31	12
(Norway) Torild Bjørnstad	2	2	18	21
(Czech Republic) Hana Synáčková	2	2	21	22
(Switzerland) Zoe Schwaller	0	4	10	26

Pool D	W	L	PF	PA
(Switzerland) Xenia Schwaller	4	0	28	16
(Italy) Stefania Constantini	3	1	32	19
(Switzerland) Roxane Héritier	2	2	28	20
(Czech Republic) Team Kubešková	1	3	24	26
(Switzerland) Sophie Heinimann	0	4	8	39

== Round robin results ==
All draw times listed in Central European Time (UTC+01:00).

=== Draw 1 ===
Friday, September 20, 8:30 am

Sheet 1	1	2	3	4	5	6	7	8	Final
(Switzerland) Silvana Tirinzoni 🔨	3	2	3	1	X	X	X	X	9
(Hungary) Vera Kalocsai-van Dorp	0	0	0	0	X	X	X	X	0

Sheet 2	1	2	3	4	5	6	7	8	Final
(Denmark) Madeleine Dupont	0	0	2	0	1	3	4	X	10
(Estonia) Liisa Turmann 🔨	0	1	0	2	0	0	0	X	3

Sheet 3	1	2	3	4	5	6	7	8	Final
(Sweden) Anna Hasselborg	0	2	0	1	5	0	X	X	8
(Switzerland) Ariane Oberson 🔨	0	0	1	0	0	1	X	X	2

Sheet 4	1	2	3	4	5	6	7	8	Final
(Sweden) Isabella Wranå 🔨	3	1	2	3	0	3	X	X	12
(Switzerland) Zoe Schwaller	0	0	0	0	2	0	X	X	2

Sheet 5	1	2	3	4	5	6	7	8	Final
(Scotland) Fay Henderson 🔨	1	2	0	3	0	2	0	X	8
(Czech Republic) Hana Synáčková	0	0	1	0	2	0	2	X	5

=== Draw 2 ===
Friday, September 20, 12:00 pm

Sheet 1	1	2	3	4	5	6	7	8	Final
(Italy) Stefania Constantini 🔨	3	4	4	2	0	X	X	X	13
(Switzerland) Sophie Heinimann	0	0	0	0	2	X	X	X	2

Sheet 2	1	2	3	4	5	6	7	8	Final
(Hungary) Vera Kalocsai-van Dorp 🔨	2	0	0	1	0	0	X	X	3
(Switzerland) Corrie Hürlimann	0	2	2	0	4	2	X	X	10

Sheet 3	1	2	3	4	5	6	7	8	Final
(Switzerland) Zoe Schwaller 🔨	0	0	0	0	0	0	2	X	2
(Norway) Torild Bjørnstad	0	0	1	0	1	1	0	X	3

Sheet 4	1	2	3	4	5	6	7	8	9	Final
(Switzerland) Xenia Schwaller	0	1	0	1	0	2	0	0	1	5
(Switzerland) Roxane Héritier 🔨	0	0	1	0	1	0	1	1	0	4

Sheet 5	1	2	3	4	5	6	7	8	Final
(Norway) Marianne Rørvik 🔨	2	0	2	0	2	0	1	X	7
(Italy) Rebecca Mariani	0	1	0	1	0	1	0	X	3

=== Draw 3 ===
Friday, September 20, 4:00 pm

Sheet 1	1	2	3	4	5	6	7	8	Final
(Italy) Rebecca Mariani	0	1	0	1	0	0	0	X	2
(Sweden) Anna Hasselborg 🔨	3	0	3	0	0	1	1	X	8

Sheet 2	1	2	3	4	5	6	7	8	Final
(Czech Republic) Hana Synáčková	0	2	0	1	0	0	1	1	5
(Sweden) Isabella Wranå 🔨	0	0	2	0	1	1	0	0	4

Sheet 3	1	2	3	4	5	6	7	8	Final
(Estonia) Liisa Turmann	0	0	0	2	0	1	X	X	3
(Switzerland) Silvana Tirinzoni 🔨	2	1	1	0	3	0	X	X	7

Sheet 4	1	2	3	4	5	6	7	8	Final
(Switzerland) Sophie Heinimann	0	0	1	0	0	1	0	X	2
(Czech Republic) Team Kubešková 🔨	2	0	0	1	2	0	4	X	9

Sheet 5	1	2	3	4	5	6	7	8	Final
(Switzerland) Ariane Oberson	0	0	0	3	0	3	1	0	7
(Scotland) Laura Watt 🔨	1	1	3	0	3	0	0	1	9

=== Draw 4 ===
Friday, September 20, 7:30 pm

Sheet 1	1	2	3	4	5	6	7	8	Final
(Norway) Torild Bjørnstad	0	2	1	1	0	0	1	0	5
(Scotland) Fay Henderson 🔨	0	0	0	0	1	2	0	3	6

Sheet 2	1	2	3	4	5	6	7	8	Final
(Switzerland) Roxane Héritier 🔨	0	1	0	0	0	2	0	1	4
(Italy) Stefania Constantini	1	0	2	1	1	0	1	0	6

Sheet 3	1	2	3	4	5	6	7	8	Final
(Czech Republic) Team Kubešková	0	2	0	2	0	1	0	0	5
(Switzerland) Xenia Schwaller 🔨	1	0	1	0	3	0	1	1	7

Sheet 4	1	2	3	4	5	6	7	8	Final
(Scotland) Laura Watt 🔨	0	0	1	0	1	0	X	X	2
(Norway) Marianne Rørvik	0	3	0	3	0	2	X	X	8

Sheet 5	1	2	3	4	5	6	7	8	Final
(Switzerland) Corrie Hürlimann	0	2	0	2	0	1	1	0	6
(Denmark) Madeleine Dupont 🔨	3	0	1	0	1	0	0	2	7

=== Draw 5 ===
Saturday, September 21, 8:00 am

Sheet 1	1	2	3	4	5	6	7	8	Final
(Norway) Marianne Rørvik	0	1	1	3	2	0	X	X	7
(Switzerland) Ariane Oberson 🔨	1	0	0	0	0	1	X	X	2

Sheet 2	1	2	3	4	5	6	7	8	Final
(Scotland) Fay Henderson	0	1	0	1	0	2	1	X	5
(Switzerland) Zoe Schwaller 🔨	1	0	0	0	1	0	0	X	2

Sheet 3	1	2	3	4	5	6	7	8	Final
(Denmark) Madeleine Dupont 🔨	2	2	0	5	0	0	0	1	10
(Hungary) Vera Kalocsai-van Dorp	0	0	2	0	3	1	1	0	7

Sheet 4	1	2	3	4	5	6	7	8	Final
(Switzerland) Corrie Hürlimann	2	1	0	0	0	1	1	0	5
(Switzerland) Silvana Tirinzoni 🔨	0	0	1	4	1	0	0	1	7

Sheet 5	1	2	3	4	5	6	7	8	Final
(Norway) Torild Bjørnstad	0	0	1	1	0	2	0	X	4
(Sweden) Isabella Wranå 🔨	2	1	0	0	2	0	3	X	8

=== Draw 6 ===
Saturday, September 21, 11:30 am

Sheet 1	1	2	3	4	5	6	7	8	Final
(Estonia) Liisa Turmann 🔨	2	0	0	1	1	1	0	2	7
(Switzerland) Corrie Hürlimann	0	2	1	0	0	0	1	0	4

Sheet 2	1	2	3	4	5	6	7	8	Final
(Switzerland) Sophie Heinimann	0	0	0	0	0	1	X	X	1
(Switzerland) Xenia Schwaller 🔨	3	0	2	1	1	0	X	X	7

Sheet 3	1	2	3	4	5	6	7	8	Final
(Scotland) Laura Watt 🔨	0	1	0	0	0	0	2	0	3
(Sweden) Anna Hasselborg	1	0	2	0	1	0	0	1	5

Sheet 4	1	2	3	4	5	6	7	8	Final
(Czech Republic) Hana Synáčková 🔨	1	0	0	2	1	0	1	X	5
(Norway) Torild Bjørnstad	0	1	1	0	0	4	0	X	6

Sheet 5	1	2	3	4	5	6	7	8	Final
(Italy) Stefania Constantini 🔨	4	0	0	1	1	0	1	X	7
(Czech Republic) Team Kubešková	0	1	1	0	0	2	0	X	4

=== Draw 7 ===
Saturday, September 21, 3:30 pm

Sheet 1	1	2	3	4	5	6	7	8	Final
(Switzerland) Zoe Schwaller 🔨	0	1	1	0	0	0	2	0	4
(Czech Republic) Hana Synáčková	0	0	0	1	1	3	0	1	6

Sheet 2	1	2	3	4	5	6	7	8	Final
(Switzerland) Silvana Tirinzoni 🔨	1	5	3	X	X	X	X	X	9
(Denmark) Madeleine Dupont	0	0	0	X	X	X	X	X	0

Sheet 3	1	2	3	4	5	6	7	8	Final
(Sweden) Isabella Wranå 🔨	0	0	3	0	0	2	2	X	7
(Scotland) Fay Henderson	0	0	0	0	1	0	0	X	1

Sheet 4	1	2	3	4	5	6	7	8	Final
(Switzerland) Ariane Oberson	0	0	2	1	1	1	0	1	6
(Italy) Rebecca Mariani 🔨	0	2	0	0	0	0	2	0	4

Sheet 5	1	2	3	4	5	6	7	8	Final
(Switzerland) Roxane Héritier 🔨	1	0	2	0	2	1	4	X	10
(Switzerland) Sophie Heinimann	0	2	0	1	0	0	0	X	3

=== Draw 8 ===
Saturday, September 21, 7:30 pm

Sheet 1	1	2	3	4	5	6	7	8	Final
(Czech Republic) Team Kubešková 🔨	2	0	0	0	0	4	0	0	6
(Switzerland) Roxane Héritier	0	3	3	1	1	0	1	1	10

Sheet 2	1	2	3	4	5	6	7	8	Final
(Sweden) Anna Hasselborg 🔨	0	1	0	1	0	0	1	X	3
(Norway) Marianne Rørvik	1	0	2	0	0	2	0	X	5

Sheet 3	1	2	3	4	5	6	7	8	9	Final
(Switzerland) Xenia Schwaller 🔨	2	0	2	1	1	0	0	0	3	9
(Italy) Stefania Constantini	0	2	0	0	0	2	1	1	0	6

Sheet 4	1	2	3	4	5	6	7	8	Final
(Hungary) Vera Kalocsai-van Dorp 🔨	0	0	1	0	1	0	X	X	2
(Estonia) Liisa Turmann	1	1	0	3	0	4	X	X	9

Sheet 5	1	2	3	4	5	6	7	8	Final
(Italy) Rebecca Mariani	3	0	0	0	0	1	0	X	4
(Scotland) Laura Watt 🔨	0	3	2	1	1	0	1	X	8

== Playoffs ==
Quarterfinals
1	(Switzerland) Xenia Schwaller	4
8	(Italy) Stefania Constantini	2
4	(Sweden) Isabella Wranå	4
5	(Sweden) Anna Hasselborg	5
2	(Switzerland) Silvana Tirinzoni	7
7	(Denmark) Madeleine Dupont	3
3	(Norway) Marianne Rørvik	2
6	(Scotland) Fay Henderson	5

Semifinals
1	(Switzerland) Xenia Schwaller	4
5	(Sweden) Anna Hasselborg	7
2	(Switzerland) Silvana Tirinzoni	8
6	(Scotland) Fay Henderson	4

Final
5	(Sweden) Anna Hasselborg	3
2	(Switzerland) Silvana Tirinzoni	8

=== Quarterfinals ===
Sunday, September 22, 8:00 am

Sheet 1	1	2	3	4	5	6	7	8	Final
(Sweden) Isabella Wranå 🔨	0	0	0	2	0	1	0	1	4
(Sweden) Anna Hasselborg	0	0	1	0	2	0	2	0	5

Sheet 2	1	2	3	4	5	6	7	8	Final
(Switzerland) Xenia Schwaller 🔨	0	0	2	0	0	0	1	1	4
(Italy) Stefania Constantini	1	0	0	0	1	0	0	0	2

Sheet 4	1	2	3	4	5	6	7	8	Final
(Switzerland) Silvana Tirinzoni 🔨	2	0	2	0	3	0	X	X	7
(Denmark) Madeleine Dupont	0	1	0	1	0	1	X	X	3

Sheet 5	1	2	3	4	5	6	7	8	Final
(Norway) Marianne Rørvik 🔨	0	0	0	0	2	0	0	X	2
(Scotland) Fay Henderson	0	2	1	1	0	0	1	X	5

=== Semifinals ===
Sunday, September 22, 11:15 am

Sheet 2	1	2	3	4	5	6	7	8	Final
(Switzerland) Silvana Tirinzoni 🔨	3	0	0	4	0	0	1	X	8
(Scotland) Fay Henderson	0	0	1	0	2	1	0	X	4

Sheet 4	1	2	3	4	5	6	7	8	Final
(Switzerland) Xenia Schwaller 🔨	1	0	0	1	1	0	1	0	4
(Sweden) Anna Hasselborg	0	4	1	0	0	1	0	1	7

=== Final ===
Sunday, September 22, 2:30 pm

Sheet 3	1	2	3	4	5	6	7	8	Final
(Sweden) Anna Hasselborg	0	0	1	1	1	0	0	X	3
(Switzerland) Silvana Tirinzoni 🔨	0	3	0	0	0	2	3	X	8
