= 2025 International Bernese Ladies Cup =

World Curling Tour event

- Host city: Bern, Switzerland
- Arena: Curling Bern
- Dates: January 23–26
- Winner: (Switzerland) Team Tirinzoni
- Curling club: CC Aarau, Aarau
- Skip: Silvana Tirinzoni
- Fourth: Alina Pätz
- Second: Carole Howald
- Lead: Selina Witschonke
- Coach: Pierre Charette
- Finalist: (Switzerland) Xenia Schwaller

The 2025 International Bernese Ladies Cup was held from January 23 to 26 at Curling Bern in Bern, Switzerland as part of the World Curling Tour. The event was held in a round-robin format with a purse of 20,000 CHF.

In an all-Swiss final, Silvana Tirinzoni and her team from Aarau beat Xenia Schwaller's Zurich rink 3–1. Tirinzoni, with Alina Pätz, Carole Howald and Selina Witschonke, stole points in the fifth and eighth ends to seal the win after Schwaller's final draw came up short. To reach the final, Team Tirinzoni finished 4–1 through the round robin and won playoff games over Sweden's Isabella Wranå and Scotland's Fay Henderson. For Schwaller, they qualified for the playoffs with an unblemished 5–0 record and beat Team Constantini in the quarterfinals and Corrie Hürlimann in the semifinals. Team Morrison of Scotland and Team Kubešková of Czech Republic rounded out the playoff field.

== Teams ==
The teams are listed as follows:

Skip	Third	Second	Lead	Alternate	Locale
Giulia Zardini Lacedelli (Note: Third Giulia Zardini Lacedelli skipped Team Stefania Constantini.)	Marta Lo Deserto	Elena Mathis	Angela Romei	Veronica Zappone	Cortina d'Ampezzo, Italy
Madeleine Dupont	Mathilde Halse	Denise Dupont	My Larsen	Jasmin Holtermann	Hvidovre, Denmark
Fay Henderson	Robyn Munro	Hailey Duff	Katie McMillan	Lisa Davie	Stirling, Scotland
Roxane Héritier	Melina Bezzola	Anna Gut	Nadine Bärtschiger		Luzern, Switzerland
Jana Hoffmann	Johanna Blackham	Nuala Guex	Anika Meier		Basel, Switzerland
Corrie Hürlimann	Marina Lörtscher	Stefanie Berset	Celine Schwizgebel		Zug, Switzerland
Elodie Jerger	Alissa Rudolf	Jana-Tamara Haehlin	Renée Frigo		Baden, Switzerland
Alžběta Zelingrová (Note: Third Alžběta Zelingrová skipped Team Anna Kubešková.)	Michaela Baudyšová	Karolína Špundová	Aneta Müllerová		Prague, Czech Republic
Rebecca Mariani	Giorgia Maurino	Lucrezia Grande	Letizia Carlisano	Rachele Scalesse	Trentino, Italy
Kim Sutor (Fourth)	Sara Messenzehl (Skip)	Joy Sutor	Annelie Abdel Halim (Note: Annelie Abdel Halim spared for Zoé Antes. She played lead while lead Joy Sutor moved up to second.)		Füssen, Germany
Rebecca Morrison (Fourth)	Jennifer Dodds	Sophie Sinclair	Sophie Jackson (Skip) (Note: Sophie Jackson skipped Team Morrison.)		Stirling, Scotland
Ariane Oberson	Laurane Flückiger	Lia Germann	Enya Caccivio	Isabel Einspieler	Bern, Switzerland
Teresa Treichl (Fourth)	Verena Pflügler (Skip)	Astrid Pflügler	Emma Müller	Hannah Wittibschlaeger	Kitzbühel, Austria
Marianne Rørvik	– (Note: Team Rørvik played with three players.)	Mille Haslev Nordbye	Eilin Kjærland		Lillehammer, Norway
Xenia Schwaller	Selina Gafner	Fabienne Rieder	Selina Rychiger		Zurich, Switzerland
Zoe Schwaller	Jana Soltermann	Anikò Székely	Ladina Ramstein		Limmattal, Switzerland
Hana Synáčková	Linda Nemčoková	Martina Strnadová	Karolína Frederiksen		Prague, Czech Republic
Alina Pätz (Fourth)	Silvana Tirinzoni (Skip)	Carole Howald	Selina Witschonke		Aarau, Switzerland
Erika Tuvike (Fourth)	Kerli Laidsalu	Liisa Turmann (Skip)	Heili Grossmann		Tallinn, Estonia
Wang Rui	Han Yu	Dong Ziqi	Jiang Jiayi	Su Tingyu	Beijing, China
Isabella Wranå	Almida de Val	Maria Larsson	Linda Stenlund		Sundbyberg, Sweden
Dilşat Yıldız	Öznur Polat	İfayet Şafak Çalıkuşu	Berfin Şengül	İclal Karaman	Erzurum, Turkey

== Round robin standings ==
Final Round Robin Standings

Key
Teams to Playoffs

Pool A	W	L	PF	PA
(Switzerland) Silvana Tirinzoni	4	1	35	16
(Scotland) Fay Henderson	4	1	32	18
(Denmark) Madeleine Dupont	3	2	29	24
(Switzerland) Jana Hoffmann	2	3	24	30
(Czech Republic) Hana Synáčková	1	4	15	35
(Italy) Rebecca Mariani	1	4	20	32

Pool B	W	L	PF	PA
(Scotland) Team Morrison	5	0	37	14
(Switzerland) Corrie Hürlimann	4	1	28	17
(Italy) Team Constantini	3	2	29	28
(Switzerland) Zoe Schwaller	2	3	19	28
(Germany) Sara Messenzehl	1	4	19	28
(Austria) Verena Pflügler	0	5	17	34

Pool C	W	L	PF	PA
(Switzerland) Xenia Schwaller	5	0	38	23
(Sweden) Isabella Wranå	5	0	35	18
(Czech Republic) Team Kubešková	4	1	27	18
(Switzerland) Ariane Oberson	3	2	27	28
(Turkey) Dilşat Yıldız	2	3	25	30

Pool D	W	L	PF	PA
(Switzerland) Roxane Héritier	2	3	29	31
(Norway) Marianne Rørvik	2	3	24	25
(China) Wang Rui	2	3	27	20
(Switzerland) Elodie Jerger	0	5	12	40
(Estonia) Liisa Turmann	0	5	25	36

== Round robin results ==
All draw times listed in Central European Time (UTC+01:00).

=== Draw 1 ===
Thursday, January 23, 4:30 pm

Sheet 3	1	2	3	4	5	6	7	8	Final
(Scotland) Team Morrison	0	1	1	1	2	0	0	1	6
(Germany) Sara Messenzehl	1	0	0	0	0	3	0	0	4

Sheet 4	1	2	3	4	5	6	7	8	Final
(Denmark) Madeleine Dupont	1	0	0	0	1	0	X	X	2
(Scotland) Fay Henderson	0	0	2	2	0	4	X	X	8

Sheet 5	1	2	3	4	5	6	7	8	Final
(Turkey) Dilşat Yıldız	0	2	0	1	0	0	0	X	3
(Switzerland) Roxane Héritier	2	0	1	0	0	2	5	X	10

Sheet 6	1	2	3	4	5	6	7	8	Final
(Czech Republic) Team Kubešková	0	0	0	2	0	2	0	1	5
(China) Wang Rui	0	1	0	0	2	0	0	0	3

Sheet 7	1	2	3	4	5	6	7	8	Final
(Sweden) Isabella Wranå	0	1	0	2	0	0	4	1	8
(Estonia) Liisa Turmann	1	0	1	0	2	1	0	0	5

=== Draw 2 ===
Thursday, January 23, 8:00 pm

Sheet 1	1	2	3	4	5	6	7	8	Final
(Czech Republic) Hana Synáčková	0	1	1	0	0	0	X	X	2
(Switzerland) Jana Hoffmann	3	0	0	0	4	1	X	X	8

Sheet 2	1	2	3	4	5	6	7	8	Final
(Switzerland) Corrie Hürlimann	0	0	0	0	2	2	1	X	5
(Austria) Verena Pflügler	0	1	1	0	0	0	0	X	2

Sheet 3	1	2	3	4	5	6	7	8	Final
(Switzerland) Silvana Tirinzoni	1	2	0	3	1	X	X	X	7
(Italy) Rebecca Mariani	0	0	1	0	0	X	X	X	1

Sheet 4	1	2	3	4	5	6	7	8	9	Final
(Switzerland) Ariane Oberson	0	0	0	0	3	1	0	0	1	5
(Norway) Marianne Rørvik	0	0	0	1	0	0	2	1	0	4

Sheet 5	1	2	3	4	5	6	7	8	Final
(Switzerland) Xenia Schwaller	1	0	3	1	0	2	X	X	7
(Switzerland) Elodie Jerger	0	1	0	0	1	0	X	X	2

Sheet 6	1	2	3	4	5	6	7	8	Final
(Italy) Team Constantini	2	0	1	0	0	0	0	2	5
(Switzerland) Zoe Schwaller	0	1	0	0	0	0	3	0	4

=== Draw 3 ===
Friday, January 24, 8:30 am

Sheet 1	1	2	3	4	5	6	7	8	Final
(Denmark) Madeleine Dupont	1	0	0	2	3	0	0	1	7
(Italy) Rebecca Mariani	0	1	3	0	0	1	0	0	5

Sheet 2	1	2	3	4	5	6	7	8	Final
(Czech Republic) Team Kubešková	0	0	0	1	0	0	1	0	2
(Norway) Marianne Rørvik	0	0	1	0	0	2	0	1	4

Sheet 3	1	2	3	4	5	6	7	8	Final
(Turkey) Dilşat Yıldız	3	0	2	1	0	1	0	X	7
(Estonia) Liisa Turmann	0	2	0	0	1	0	1	X	4

Sheet 4	1	2	3	4	5	6	7	8	Final
(Switzerland) Xenia Schwaller	2	3	0	1	0	2	1	X	9
(Switzerland) Roxane Héritier	0	0	2	0	4	0	0	X	6

Sheet 5	1	2	3	4	5	6	7	8	Final
(Sweden) Isabella Wranå	0	3	1	0	1	0	1	X	6
(China) Wang Rui	1	0	0	1	0	1	0	X	3

Sheet 6	1	2	3	4	5	6	7	8	Final
(Scotland) Fay Henderson	1	0	0	2	2	0	2	X	7
(Switzerland) Jana Hoffmann	0	1	0	0	0	1	0	X	2

Sheet 7	1	2	3	4	5	6	7	8	Final
(Italy) Team Constantini	2	1	0	2	0	3	X	X	8
(Germany) Sara Messenzehl	0	0	1	0	2	0	X	X	3

Sheet 8	1	2	3	4	5	6	7	8	Final
(Scotland) Team Morrison	2	1	2	2	0	X	X	X	7
(Switzerland) Zoe Schwaller	0	0	0	0	1	X	X	X	1

=== Draw 4 ===
Friday, January 24, 12:15 pm

Sheet 1	1	2	3	4	5	6	7	8	Final
(Switzerland) Ariane Oberson	0	0	0	0	1	X	X	X	1
(China) Wang Rui	2	3	2	1	0	X	X	X	8

Sheet 2	1	2	3	4	5	6	7	8	Final
(Switzerland) Silvana Tirinzoni	1	1	1	4	2	X	X	X	9
(Czech Republic) Hana Synáčková	0	0	0	0	0	X	X	X	0

Sheet 3	1	2	3	4	5	6	7	8	Final
(Sweden) Isabella Wranå	4	0	1	2	0	X	X	X	7
(Switzerland) Elodie Jerger	0	1	0	0	1	X	X	X	2

Sheet 4	1	2	3	4	5	6	7	8	Final
(Czech Republic) Team Kubešková	0	1	0	1	2	2	0	X	6
(Estonia) Liisa Turmann	1	0	1	0	0	0	1	X	3

Sheet 5	1	2	3	4	5	6	7	8	Final
(Denmark) Madeleine Dupont	0	3	2	0	3	X	X	X	8
(Switzerland) Jana Hoffmann	1	0	0	1	0	X	X	X	2

Sheet 6	1	2	3	4	5	6	7	8	Final
(Switzerland) Corrie Hürlimann	0	1	1	0	0	0	1	1	4
(Germany) Sara Messenzehl	0	0	0	0	2	1	0	0	3

Sheet 7	1	2	3	4	5	6	7	8	Final
(Scotland) Team Morrison	2	1	0	1	2	2	X	X	8
(Austria) Verena Pflügler	0	0	1	0	0	0	X	X	1

=== Draw 5 ===
Friday, January 24, 4:00 pm

Sheet 1	1	2	3	4	5	6	7	8	Final
(Switzerland) Xenia Schwaller	1	3	0	1	0	1	0	0	6
(Estonia) Liisa Turmann	0	0	2	0	1	0	1	1	5

Sheet 2	1	2	3	4	5	6	7	8	Final
(Italy) Team Constantini	1	0	0	0	0	0	X	X	1
(Switzerland) Corrie Hürlimann	0	2	2	2	1	2	X	X	9

Sheet 3	1	2	3	4	5	6	7	8	Final
(Czech Republic) Hana Synáčková	2	0	2	0	0	0	1	1	6
(Italy) Rebecca Mariani	0	0	0	1	2	1	0	0	4

Sheet 4	1	2	3	4	5	6	7	8	9	Final
(Switzerland) Zoe Schwaller	0	2	1	0	0	0	2	0	1	6
(Austria) Verena Pflügler	1	0	0	0	1	1	0	2	0	5

Sheet 5	1	2	3	4	5	6	7	8	Final
(Switzerland) Silvana Tirinzoni	1	2	0	2	0	2	X	X	7
(Scotland) Fay Henderson	0	0	1	0	2	0	X	X	3

Sheet 6	1	2	3	4	5	6	7	8	Final
(Sweden) Isabella Wranå	4	0	0	0	1	0	1	1	7
(Norway) Marianne Rørvik	0	1	2	2	0	1	0	0	6

Sheet 7	1	2	3	4	5	6	7	8	Final
(Switzerland) Ariane Oberson	1	0	0	0	1	1	0	X	3
(Switzerland) Roxane Héritier	0	1	2	1	0	0	3	X	7

Sheet 8	1	2	3	4	5	6	7	8	Final
(Turkey) Dilşat Yıldız	1	4	0	0	3	4	X	X	12
(Switzerland) Elodie Jerger	0	0	2	1	0	0	X	X	3

=== Draw 6 ===
Friday, January 24, 8:00 pm

Sheet 1	1	2	3	4	5	6	7	8	Final
(Germany) Sara Messenzehl	0	0	2	0	3	1	0	0	6
(Austria) Verena Pflügler	1	0	0	2	0	0	1	1	5

Sheet 2	1	2	3	4	5	6	7	8	Final
(Italy) Rebecca Mariani	1	0	4	0	0	2	0	X	7
(Switzerland) Jana Hoffmann	0	1	0	1	1	0	2	X	5

Sheet 3	1	2	3	4	5	6	7	8	Final
(Switzerland) Xenia Schwaller	6	0	0	0	3	X	X	X	9
(Norway) Marianne Rørvik	0	2	1	1	0	X	X	X	4

Sheet 4	1	2	3	4	5	6	7	8	Final
(Czech Republic) Team Kubešková	3	0	0	1	3	0	2	X	9
(Switzerland) Roxane Héritier	0	1	2	0	0	1	0	X	4

Sheet 5	1	2	3	4	5	6	7	8	Final
(Italy) Team Constantini	3	0	1	0	2	0	0	0	6
(Scotland) Team Morrison	0	1	0	1	0	3	1	2	8

Sheet 6	1	2	3	4	5	6	7	8	Final
(Switzerland) Silvana Tirinzoni	0	1	0	0	1	1	0	3	6
(Denmark) Madeleine Dupont	2	0	0	0	0	0	3	0	5

Sheet 7	1	2	3	4	5	6	7	8	Final
(Turkey) Dilşat Yıldız	1	0	0	0	X	X	X	X	1
(China) Wang Rui	0	4	1	2	X	X	X	X	7

=== Draw 7 ===
Saturday, January 25, 9:00 am

Sheet 1	1	2	3	4	5	6	7	8	Final
(Sweden) Isabella Wranå	1	1	0	3	0	2	X	X	7
(Switzerland) Roxane Héritier	0	0	1	0	1	0	X	X	2

Sheet 2	1	2	3	4	5	6	7	8	Final
(Turkey) Dilşat Yıldız	0	0	0	1	0	1	X	X	2
(Norway) Marianne Rørvik	0	2	2	0	2	0	X	X	6

Sheet 3	1	2	3	4	5	6	7	8	Final
(Denmark) Madeleine Dupont	0	0	2	1	0	0	2	2	7
(Czech Republic) Hana Synáčková	0	1	0	0	1	1	0	0	3

Sheet 4	1	2	3	4	5	6	7	8	Final
(Scotland) Fay Henderson	0	0	3	0	2	0	2	X	7
(Italy) Rebecca Mariani	0	1	0	1	0	1	0	X	3

Sheet 5	1	2	3	4	5	6	7	8	Final
(Switzerland) Corrie Hürlimann	1	0	0	1	3	0	3	X	8
(Switzerland) Zoe Schwaller	0	1	0	0	0	2	0	X	3

Sheet 6	1	2	3	4	5	6	7	8	Final
(Switzerland) Ariane Oberson	0	3	0	1	1	4	X	X	9
(Switzerland) Elodie Jerger	0	0	1	0	0	0	X	X	1

=== Draw 8 ===
Saturday, January 25, 2:00 pm

Sheet 1	1	2	3	4	5	6	7	8	Final
(Czech Republic) Team Kubešková	2	0	1	0	0	1	0	1	5
(Switzerland) Elodie Jerger	0	3	0	0	0	0	1	0	4

Sheet 2	1	2	3	4	5	6	7	8	Final
(Germany) Sara Messenzehl	0	0	2	0	0	0	1	X	3
(Switzerland) Zoe Schwaller	0	2	0	0	2	1	0	X	5

Sheet 3	1	2	3	4	5	6	7	8	Final
(Italy) Team Constantini	0	0	3	0	2	0	4	X	9
(Austria) Verena Pflügler	1	1	0	1	0	1	0	X	4

Sheet 4	1	2	3	4	5	6	7	8	Final
(Scotland) Team Morrison	1	2	1	0	2	2	X	X	8
(Switzerland) Corrie Hürlimann	0	0	0	2	0	0	X	X	2

Sheet 5	1	2	3	4	5	6	7	8	9	Final
(Switzerland) Ariane Oberson	0	0	2	1	0	2	0	3	1	9
(Estonia) Liisa Turmann	3	1	0	0	2	0	2	0	0	8

Sheet 6	1	2	3	4	5	6	7	8	Final
(Switzerland) Xenia Schwaller	2	0	0	2	0	3	0	X	7
(China) Wang Rui	0	1	0	0	2	0	3	X	6

Sheet 7	1	2	3	4	5	6	7	8	Final
(Switzerland) Silvana Tirinzoni	0	2	0	1	0	0	3	0	6
(Switzerland) Jana Hoffmann	2	0	1	0	2	1	0	1	7

Sheet 8	1	2	3	4	5	6	7	8	Final
(Scotland) Fay Henderson	0	1	0	2	0	3	1	X	7
(Czech Republic) Hana Synáčková	2	0	1	0	1	0	0	X	4

== Playoffs ==
Quarterfinals
1	(Switzerland) Xenia Schwaller	7
8	(Italy) Team Constantini	4
4	(Czech Republic) Team Kubešková	7
5	(Switzerland) Corrie Hürlimann	9
3	(Sweden) Isabella Wranå	2
6	(Switzerland) Silvana Tirinzoni	7
2	(Scotland) Team Morrison	4
7	(Scotland) Fay Henderson	5

Semifinals
1	(Switzerland) Xenia Schwaller	9
5	(Switzerland) Corrie Hürlimann	4
6	(Switzerland) Silvana Tirinzoni	9
7	(Scotland) Fay Henderson	1

Final
1	(Switzerland) Xenia Schwaller	1
6	(Switzerland) Silvana Tirinzoni	3

=== Quarterfinals ===
Saturday, January 25, 7:00 pm

Sheet 3	1	2	3	4	5	6	7	8	Final
(Sweden) Isabella Wranå	0	0	1	1	0	0	0	X	2
(Switzerland) Silvana Tirinzoni	0	4	0	0	0	2	1	X	7

Sheet 4	1	2	3	4	5	6	7	8	Final
(Czech Republic) Team Kubešková	4	0	2	0	0	1	0	0	7
(Switzerland) Corrie Hürlimann	0	2	0	2	1	0	3	1	9

Sheet 5	1	2	3	4	5	6	7	8	Final
(Switzerland) Xenia Schwaller	2	1	1	0	1	2	0	X	7
(Italy) Team Constantini	0	0	0	2	0	0	2	X	4

Sheet 6	1	2	3	4	5	6	7	8	Final
(Scotland) Team Morrison	0	0	0	2	0	1	1	0	4
(Scotland) Fay Henderson	0	0	1	0	0	0	0	4	5

=== Semifinals ===
Sunday, January 26, 9:00 am

Sheet 4	1	2	3	4	5	6	7	8	Final
(Switzerland) Silvana Tirinzoni	0	0	5	0	3	1	X	X	9
(Scotland) Fay Henderson	0	0	0	1	0	0	X	X	1

Sheet 6	1	2	3	4	5	6	7	8	Final
(Switzerland) Xenia Schwaller	1	0	2	0	3	0	2	1	9
(Switzerland) Corrie Hürlimann	0	2	0	1	0	1	0	0	4

=== Final ===
Sunday, January 26, 1:30 pm

Sheet 5	1	2	3	4	5	6	7	8	Final
(Switzerland) Xenia Schwaller	1	0	0	0	0	0	0	0	1
(Switzerland) Silvana Tirinzoni	0	0	0	1	1	0	0	1	3
