= Estonian Women's Curling Championship =

The Estonian Women's Curling Championship (Estonian: Eesti kurlingu naiste meistrivõistlused) is the national championship of women's curling teams in Estonia. It has been held annually since the 2004–2005 season, and is organized by the Estonian Curling Association.

== List of champions and medallists ==
Team line-ups shows in order: fourth, third, second, lead, alternate (if exists), coach (if exists); skips marked bold.

Year	Dates Host city	Champion	Runner-up	Bronze
2005	–	"Erkki Tiim": Maile Mölder, Eve-Lyn Korka, Helen Kadarik, Ereth Kadarik, alternate: Evelin Eiert	"Optima Top": Külli Kariste, Marju Velga, Katrin Kuusk, Ingrid Keerma	"Puhastusimport": Kristiine Lill, Siret Voll, Anneli Sinirand, Ruth Sell
2006	March ...–20; Tallinn	"Arenaria": Maile Mölder, Eve-Lyn Korka, Evelin Eiert, Marge Vaher	"Puhastusimport": Kristiine Lill, Siret Voll, Marju Velga, Katrin Kuusk, alternate: Ööle Janson	"Jeti"
2007	March ...–1; Tallinn	"Puhastusimport": Kristiine Lill, Ööle Janson, Katrin Kuusk, Marju Velga, alternate: Anneli Sinirand	"SK Kratt": Anne-Liis Leht, Evelin Eiert, Aljona Aranson, Reena Raudne, alternate: Kristiina Uslar	"Arenaria": Maile Mölder, Eve-Lyn Korka, Marge Vaher, Margit Peebo, alternate: Merle Toom
2008	March ...–31; Tallinn	"Arenaria": Maile Mölder, Eve-Lyn Korka, Marge Vaher, Margit Peebo, alternate: Merle Toom	"Puhastusimport": Kristiine Lill, Ööle Janson, Katrin Kuusk, Marju Velga	"SK Kratt": Anne-Liis Leht, Evelin Eiert, Aljona Aranson, Reena Raudne, alternate: Kristiina Uslar
2009	March ...–3; Tallinn	"Puhastusimport": Kristiine Lill, Marju Velga, Ööle Janson, Katrin Kuusk, coach: Martin Lill	"Arenaria": Maile Mölder, Eve-Lyn Korka, Maarja Koll, Kaja Liik-Tamm, coach: Erkki Lill	"Nimetu": Reet Taidre, Küllike Ustav, Marcella Tammes, Marie Ustav, coaches: Indrek Ernits, Leo Jakobson
2010	January 16–17, 30–31; Tallinn	"Arenaria": Maile Mölder, Eve-Lyn Korka, Küllike Ustav, Helen Nummert, alternates: Gerli Roosme, Liisa Turmann, coach: Erkki Lill	"Puhastusimport": Kristiine Lill, Ööle Janson, Marju Velga, Katrin Kuusk, alternate: Marcella Tammes, coach: Martin Lill	"Girling": Viktoria Rudenko, Jelizaveta Dmitrijeva, Niina Danilina, Anna Dvorjaninova, Jelena Tolmatšova, coach: Vladimir Jakovlev
2011	Jan 29–30, Feb 12–13, Mar 4–6; Tallinn	"Puhastusimport": Kristiine Lill, Ööle Janson, Marju Velga, Marcella Tammes, coach: Markku Uusipaavalniemi	"Arenaria": Maile Mölder, Küllike Ustav, Jelizaveta Dmitrijeva, Eve-Lyn Korka, alternate: Kaja Liik-Tamm, coach: Erkki Lill	"Nicekond": Margit Peebo, Anne-Liis Leht, Ülle Lumiste, Tene Link, coach: Ivo Eller
2012	March ...–4; Tallinn	"Arenaria": Maile Mölder, Kristiine Lill, Küllike Ustav, Kaja Liik-Tamm, alternates: Eve-Lyn Korka, Jelizaveta Dmitrijeva, coach: Erkki Lill	"Nimetu": Helen Nummert, Liisa Turmann, Marie Turmann, Gerli Roosme, alternate: Kerli Zirk	2 teams only
2013	March 1–9; Tallinn	"Arenaria": Maile Mölder, Kristiine Lill, Küllike Ustav, Kaja Liik-Tamm, alternate: Helen Nummert, coach: Erkki Lill	"Nicekond": Anne-Liis Leht, Margit Peebo, Heili Grossmann, Ülle Lumiste, alternate: Tene Link, coach: Harri Lill	"Diamond": Marie Turmann, Liisa Turmann, Kädi Kurem, Kerli Laidsalu, alternates: Kerli Zirk, Johanna Ehatamm, coach: Martin Lill
2014	March 7–15; Tallinn	"Arenaria": Maile Mölder, Kristiine Lill, Küllike Ustav, Kaja Liik-Tamm, alternate: Marju Velga, coach: Erkki Lill	"Nicekond": Anne-Liis Leht, Margit Peebo, Tene Link, Viktoria Rudenko, coach: Harri Lill	"Naisjuunorid"; Marie Turmann, Kerli Laidsalu, Kerli Zirk, Johanna Ehatamm, alternate: Liisa Turmann, coach: Martin Lill
2015	January 30 – February 8 Tallinn	"Team Mölder": Maile Mölder, Kristiine Lill, Küllike Ustav, Marju Velga, alternates: Ööle Janson, Helen Nummert, coach: Erkki Lill	"Nicekond": Anne-Liis Leht, Heili Grossmann, Tene Link, Viktoria Rudenko, alternate: Margit Peebo	"Team Turmann"; Marie Turmann, Kerli Zirk, Kerli Laidsalu, Johanna Ehatamm, alternates: Liisa Turmann, Victoria-Laura Lõhmus, coach: Martin Lill
2016	January 29 – February 7 Tallinn	"Team Mölder": Maile Mölder, Kristiine Lill, Triin Madisson, Lembe Marley, alternate: Küllike Ustav, coach: Erkki Lill	"Team Turmann"; Marie Turmann, Kerli Laidsalu, Liisa Turmann, Victoria-Laura Lõhmus, alternate: Johanna Ehatamm, coach: Brian Gray	"Nicekond": Anne-Liis Leht, Viktoria Rudenko, Tene Link, Kaja Liik-Tamm, alternate: Heili Grossmann
2017	January 28 – February 5 Tallinn	"Team Turmann"; Marie Turmann, Liisa Turmann, Victoria-Laura Lõhmus, Erika Tuvike	"Team Mölder": Maile Mölder, Kristiine Lill, Triin Madisson, Lembe Marley	2 teams only
2018	January 25–28; Tallinn	"Team Turmann"; Marie Turmann, Kerli Laidsalu, Victoria-Laura Lõhmus, Erika Tuvike	"Team Mölder": Maile Mölder, Triin Madisson, Kristin Laidsalu, Lembe Marley	"Team Peebo": Margit Peebo, Marcella Tammes, Karoliine Kaare, Karin Vahi
2019	May 9–12; Tallinn	"Team Turmann": Marie Turmann, Kerli Laidsalu, Heili Grossmann, Erika Tuvike, alternate: Liisa Turmann	"Team Madisson": Triin Madisson, Britta Sillaots, Karin Vahi, Gerli Kägi, alternate: Kaidi Elmik, coach: Erkki Lill	"Team Liik-Tamm": Kaja Liik-Tamm, Marcella Tammes, Anna Gromova, Ingrid Novikova, Tene Link
2020	January 30 – February 1 Tallinn	"Team Turmann": Marie Turmann, Liisa Turmann, Heili Grossmann, Erika Tuvike, alternate: Karoliine Kaare, coach: Kerli Laidsalu	"Team Madisson": Triin Madisson, Britta Sillaots, Kaidi Elmik, Lembe Marley, alternate: Gerli Kägi, coach: Maile Mölder	"Team Liik-Tamm": Kaja Liik-Tamm, Tene Link, Marcella Tammes, Anna Gromova, Ülle Lumiste
2021	January 28 – 31; Tallinn	"Team Turmann": Marie Turmann, Liisa Turmann, Heili Grossmann, Erika Tuvike, alternate: Kerli Laidsalu, coach: Nicole Strausak	"Team Madisson": Triin Madisson, Britta Sillaots, Kaidi Elmik, Lembe Marley, alternate: Anna Gromova, coach: Maile Mölder	"Team Link": Ülle Lumiste, Kaja Liik-Tamm, Marcella Tammes, Tene Link, alternate: Margit Peebo, coach: Eduard Veltsman
2022	April 7 – 10; Tallinn	"Team Kaldvee": Marie Kaldvee, Liisa Turmann, Kerli Laidsalu, Erika Tuvike, alternate: Heili Grossmann	"Team Madisson": Triin Madisson, Britta Sillaots, Lembe Marley, Kaidi Elmik, alternate: Anna Gromova, coach: Maile Mölder	"Team Link": Tene Link, Ülle Lumiste, Kaja Liik-Tamm, Marcella Tammes, alternate: Margit Peebo, coach: Eduard Veltsman
2023	?			
2024	February 1 – 4 Tallinn	"Team Turmann": Erika Tuvike, Kerli Laidsalu, Liisa Turmann, Heili Grossmann	"Team Peebo": Margit Peebo, Ingrid Novikova, Küllike Ustav, Marcella Tammes, alternate: Evelyn Karro	-
2025	January 31 – February 2 Tallinn	Erika Tuvike, Kerli Laidsalu, Liisa Turmann, Heili Grossmann	Ingrid Novikova, Kulli Janikson, Natali Tammer-Jostov, Evelyn Karro	—

== Medal record for skips ==
(as of 2021; placement for skips only)

Skip	Gold	Silver	Bronze
Maile Mölder	9	4	1
Marie Kaldvee (Marie Turmann)	6	1	3
Kristiine Lill	3	3	3
Liisa Turmann	1		
Anne-Liis Leht		4	2
Triin Madisson		4	
Margit Peebo		1	2
Külli Kariste		1	
Helen Nummert		1	
Kaja Liik-Tamm			2
Tene Link			2
Viktoria Rudenko			1
Reet Taidre			1

== See also ==
- Estonian Men's Curling Championship
- Estonian Mixed Curling Championship
- Estonian Mixed Doubles Curling Championship
