= Estonian Mixed Curling Championship =

National sporting competition in Estonia

The Estonian Mixed Curling Championship (Estonian: Eesti meistrivõistlused segavõistkondade kurlingus) is the national championship of men's mixed curling teams in Estonia. It has been held annually since the 2003–2004 season to 2016–2017, and is organized by the Estonian Curling Association.

== List of champions and medallists ==
Team line-ups shows in order: fourth, third, second, lead, alternate (if exists), coach (if exists); skips marked bold.

| Year | Dates Host city | Champion | Runner-up | Bronze |
|---|---|---|---|---|
| 2004 | ...–18 April; Tallinn | "Optima II": Meelis Münt, Veiko Proos, Angelika Tauk, Toomas Tauk | "Optima I": Ingar Mäesalu, Andres Pebre, Rido Raamat, Suido Suursalu, Margo Veskimeister | "Hansa Sport": Leo Jakobson, Agu Lellep, Sven Petermann, Aivar Vulp |
| 2005 | Tallinn | "Puhastusimport Mix": Martin Lill, Ingar Mäesalu, Jan Anderson, Kristiine Lill, alternates: Siret Voll, Anneli Sinirand | "Curlers": Jaanus Rannu, Jaak Lill, Agu Lellep, Ester Penjam, alternate: Margit Peebo | "Torres": Andres Villomann, Fred Randver, Silver Lume, Anne-Liis Leht, alternate: Maris Altunjan |
| 2006 | ...–17 April; Tallinn | "Puhastusimport": Martin Lill, Siim Sildnik, Jan Anderson, Marju Velga, alternates: Siret Voll, Ööle Janson | "Jeti": Vladimir Jakovlev, Mihhail Vlassov, Eduard Veltsman, Karolina Jefremova, alternates: Asja Baljašnikova, Aljona Aranson | "Arenaria": Erkki Lill, Toomas Lill, Harri Lill, Maile Mölder, alternate: Eve-Lyn Korka |
| 2007 | ...–1 March; Tallinn | "Puhastusimport I": Martin Lill, Ingar Mäesalu, Anneli Sinirand, Ööle Janson, alternates: Jan Anderson, Kristiine Lill | "Arenaria": Erkki Lill, Veiko Proos, Eve-Lyn Korka, Maile Mölder, alternates: Jaanus Lindre, Marge Vaher | "Puhastusimport II": Siim Sildnik, Toomas Lill, Katrin Kuusk, Karl Kukner, alternate: Marju Velga |
| 2008 | ...–31 March; Tallinn | "Rolling Stones": Vladimir Jakovlev, Andres Jakobson, Konstantin Dotsenko, Küllike Ustav, alternates: Marcella Tammes, Reet Taidre | "Puhastusimport I": Martin Lill, Ingar Mäesalu, Anneli Sinirand, Ööle Janson, alternates: Jan Anderson, Kristiine Lill | "Arenaria": Harri Lill, Erkki Lill, Maile Mölder, Jaanus Lindre, alternates: Eve-Lyn Korka, Maarja Koll |
| 2009 | ...–29 March; Tallinn | "Arenaria": Erkki Lill, Maile Mölder, Harri Lill, Maarja Koll, alternates: Helen Nummert, Jaanus Lindre | "Rolling Stones": Leo Jakobson, Küllike Ustav, Indrek Ernits, Reet Taidre, alternate: Andres Jakobson | "Puhastusimport / Örni": Martin Lill, Kristiine Lill, Jan Anderson, Ööle Janson |
| 2010 | ...–20 March; Tallinn | "Rolling Stones": Vladimir Jakovlev, Reet Taidre, Viktoria Rudenko, Aleksandr Vaganov, alternate: Andres Jakobson, coach: Leo Jakobson | "Bullseye Mixed": Eduard Veltsman, Jelizaveta Dmitrijeva, Niina Danilina, Anna Dvorjaninova, alternates: Janis Kiziridi, Mihhail Vlassov | "Puhastusimport": Martin Lill, Marju Velga, Kristiine Lill, Ingar Mäesalu, alternates: Marcella Tammes, Jan Anderson |
| 2011 | ...–27 March; Tallinn | "Arenaria": Erkki Lill, Maile Mölder, Eduard Veltsman, Kaja Liik-Tamm | "Puhastusimport": Martin Lill, Kristiine Lill, Jan Anderson, Andres Villomann, alternate: Marju Velga | "Jeti": Harri Lill, Siim Sildnik, Helen Nummert, Liisa Turmann, alternate: Marie Turmann |
| 2012 | ...–29 January; Tallinn | "Arenaria": Erkki Lill, Maile Mölder, Jaanus Lindre, Küllike Ustav, alternates: Eduard Veltsman, Jelizaveta Dmitrijeva | "Rolling Stones": Leo Jakobson, Andres Jakobson, Reet Taidre, Marcella Tammes, coach: Vladimir Jakovlev | "Jeti": Harri Lill, Helen Nummert, Martin Lill, Kerli Zirk, alternate: Sander Rõuk |
| 2013 | ...–3 February; Tallinn | "Arenaria": Erkki Lill, Maile Mölder, Jaanus Lindre, Küllike Ustav, alternate: Karl Kukner | "Puhastusimport": Harri Lill, Kristiine Lill, Martin Lill, Helen Nummert | "Rolling Stones": Andres Jakobson, Reet Taidre, Indrek Ernits, Marcella Tammes, alternate: Rauno Peebo |
| 2014 | ...–9 February; Tallinn | "Pyeongchang 2018": Erkki Lill, Maile Mölder, Siim Sildnik, Marie Turmann | "Rolling Stones": Andres Jakobson, Küllike Ustav, Indrek Ernits, Marcella Tammes, alternate: Reet Taidre | "Puhastusimport": Martin Lill, Kristiine Lill, Robert-Kent Päll, Kerli Laidsalu |
| 2015 | not held | | | |
| 2016 | ...–10 April; Tallinn | "Puhastusimport": Martin Lill, Kristiine Lill, Ingar Mäesalu, Lembe Marley, coach: Marju Velga | "#Kazan": Marie Turmann, Harri Lill, Liisa Turmann, Indrek Tops | "Jäääär": Karl Kukner, Kaja Liik-Tamm, Tanel Toomväli, Ööle Janson |
| 2017 | ...–14 May; Tallinn | "TVMK": Karl Kukner, Triin Madisson, Mikk Reinsalu, Victoria-Laura Lõhmus | "CC Tallinn": Marie Turmann, Harri Lill, Liisa Turmann, Tarvin Kaldvee | "Mix Mitte": Andres Jakobson, Margit Peebo, Tarmo Vahesoo, Marcella Tammes |

== See also ==
- Estonian Men's Curling Championship
- Estonian Women's Curling Championship
- Estonian Mixed Doubles Curling Championship
