= Tallinn Ladies International Challenger =

World Curling Tour event

- Established: 2016
- Host city: Tallinn, Estonia
- Arena: Tondiraba Ice Hall
- Purse: € 6,500
- 2026 champion: (Switzerland) Zoe Schwaller

The Tallinn Ladies International Challenger, previously known as the WCT Tallinn Ladies Challenger, is an annual bonspiel, or curling tournament, held in October or November at the Tondiraba Ice Hall in Tallinn, Estonia.

The purse for the event is €6,000, with the winning team receiving €2,400. The event has been held since 2016 and has was part of the World Curling Tour from 2017 to 2023.

== Champions ==
Year	Winning team	Runner up team	Purse (€)	Winner's share (€)
2016	(Lithuania) Virginija Paulauskaitė, Lina Januleviciute, Asta Vaicekonyte, Olga Dvojeglazova	(Estonia) Maile Mölder, Kristiine Lill, Triin Madisson, Lembe Marley		
2017	(Switzerland) Larissa Berchtold (Fourth), Chantale Widmer (Skip), Lara Stocker, Roxanne Heritier	(Russia) Maria Baksheeva, Polina Bikker, Oksana Gertova, Maria Duyunova	€3,000	€1,200
2018	(Switzerland) Michèle Jäggi (Fourth), Ursi Hegner (Skip), Nina Ledergerber, Claudia Baumann	(Estonia) Maile Mölder, Lembe Marley, Britta Sillaots, Triin Madisson	€3,000	€1,200
2019	(Estonia) Marie Turmann, Kerli Laidsalu, Heili Grossmann, Erika Tuvike	(Switzerland) Nora Wüst, Marina Hauser, Ladina Müller, Lisa Gugler	€3,000	€1,200
2020	Not held			
2021	(Scotland) Eve Muirhead, Vicky Wright, Jennifer Dodds, Hailey Duff	(Norway) Eirin Mesloe, Torild Bjørnstad, Nora Østgård, Ingeborg Forbregd	€3,000	€1,200
2022	(Estonia) Marie Kaldvee, Liisa Turmann, Kerli Laidsalu, Erika Tuvike	(Germany) Kim Sutor (Fourth), Sara Messenzehl (Skip), Zoé Antes, Elisa Scheürl	€3,000	€1,200
2023	(Latvia) Evelīna Barone, Rēzija Ieviņa, Veronika Apse, Marija Seliverstova	(Turkey) Dilşat Yıldız, Öznur Polat, İfayet Şafak Çalıkuşu, Berfin Şengül, Mihriban Polat	€3,000	€1,200
2024	(Turkey) Dilşat Yıldız, Öznur Polat, İfayet Şafak Çalıkuşu, Berfin Şengül, İclal Karaman	(Estonia) Erika Tuvike (Fourth), Kerli Laidsalu, Liisa Turmann (Skip), Heili Grossmann	€3,000	€1,200
2025	(Denmark) Madeleine Dupont, Mathilde Halse, Denise Dupont, My Larsen	(Scotland) Fay Henderson, Lisa Davie, Hailey Duff, Katie McMillan	€6,000	€2,400
2026	(Switzerland) Zoe Schwaller, Jana Soltermann, Aniko Szekely, Ladina Ramstein	(Scotland) Fay Henderson, Lisa Davie, Laura Watt, Katie McMillan, Sophie Sinclair	€6,500	€3,000
