= Estonian Men's Curling Championship =

National sporting competition in Estonia

The Estonian Men's Curling Championship (Estonian: Eesti kurlingu meeste meistrivõistlused) is the national championship of men's curling teams in Estonia. It has been held annually since the 2004–2005 season, and is organized by the Estonian Curling Association.

== List of champions and medallists ==
Team line-ups shows in order: fourth, third, second, lead, alternate (if exists), coach (if exists); skips marked bold.

Year	Dates Host city	Champion	Runner-up	Bronze
2005	–	"Puhastusimport": Martin Lill, Siim Sildnik, Toomas Lill, Harri Lill, alternates: Erkki Lill, Jan Anderson	"Jeti II": Vladimir Jakovlev, Maile Mölder, Konstantin Dotsenko, Aleksei Dobrõšman, alternate: Aleksei Dikun	"Rekrea": Jaanus Lindre, Silver Uustalu, Kuldar Nurmik, Marek Lindmaa
2006	... – April 1 Tallinn	"Jeti": Vladimir Jakovlev, Konstantin Dotsenko, Aleksei Dikun, Jevgeni Aksenovski	"Hansa Sport": Leo Jakobson, Andres Jakobson, Jüri Rõuk, Sven Petermann	"Puhastusimport": Martin Lill, Ingar Mäesalu, Erkki Lill, Toomas Lill, alternate: Jan Anderson
2007	... – March 1 Tallinn	"Puhastusimport": Martin Lill, Toomas Lill, Siim Sildnik, Jan Anderson, alternate: Karl Kukner, Ingar Mäesalu	"Arenaria": Erkki Lill, Tanel Telliskivi, Harri Lill, Jaanus Lindre, alternate: Rauno Peebo	"Jeti": Vladimir Jakovlev, Konstantin Dotsenko, Aleksei Dikun, Jevgeni Aksenovski
2008	March ...–31; Tallinn	"Arenaria": Erkki Lill, Tanel Telliskivi, Harri Lill, Jaanus Lindre, alternate: Rauno Peebo	"Puhastusimport": Martin Lill, Ingar Mäesalu, Karl Kukner, Jan Anderson, alternates: Siim Sildnik, Toomas Lill	"Jeti": Vladimir Jakovlev, Konstantin Dotsenko, Aleksei Dikun, Jevgeni Aksenovski
2009	March ...–3; Tallinn	"Arenaria": Erkki Lill, Harri Lill, Jaanus Lindre, Rauno Peebo, alternates: Tanel Telliskivi, Tanel Koll	"Puhastusimport": Martin Lill, Ingar Mäesalu, Siim Sildnik, Jan Anderson, alternates: Karl Kukner, Toomas Lill	"Bullseye": Vladimir Jakovlev, Mihhail Vlassov, Janis Kiziridi, Aleksandr Vaganov, alternate: Eduard Veltsman
2010	January 15 – February 20; Tallinn	"Arenaria": Erkki Lill, Harri Lill, Jaanus Lindre, Toomas Lill, alternate: Tanel Telliskivi, coach: Maile Mölder	"Jeti": Vladimir Jakovlev, Aleksandr Orlov, Jevgeni Aksenovski, Aleksei Dikun, alternates: Anton Porotikov, Pavel Kolobuhhov	"Puhastusimport": Martin Lill, Ingar Mäesalu, Siim Sildnik, Jan Anderson, alternate: Karl Kukner, coach: Kristiine Lill
2011	January 28 – March 13; Tallinn	"Arenaria": Harri Lill, Erkki Lill, Jaanus Lindre, Tanel Telliskivi, alternate: Tanel Koll	"Cleanfix / Puhastusimport": Martin Lill, Siim Sildnik, Ingar Mäesalu, Jan Anderson, alternate: Karl Kukner	"Bullseye": Vladimir Jakovlev, Eduard Veltsman, Eduard Jakovlev, Mihhail Vlassov, alternate: Janis Kiziridi
2012	February 25 – March 10; Tallinn	"Puhastusimport": Martin Lill, Ingar Mäesalu, Jan Anderson, Karl Kukner, alternate: Siim Sildnik	"Bullseye": Mihhail Vlassov, Janis Kiziridi, Vladimir Jakovlev, Eduard Veltsman, alternate: Jevgeni Aksenovski, Eduard Jakovlev	"Hansa Sport": Leo Jakobson, Andres Jakobson, Sven Petermann, Toomas Lill, alternate: Indrek Ernits
2013	March 2–17; Tallinn	"Puhastusimport": Martin Lill, Ingar Mäesalu, Siim Sildnik, Jan Anderson	"Jeti": Harri Lill, Robert-Kent Päll, Georgi Komarov, Fred Randver	"Arenaria": Erkki Lill, Vladimir Jakovlev, Jaanus Lindre, Toomas Lill, alternate: Indrek Ernits, Karl Kukner
2014	March 8–23; Tallinn	"Puhastusimport": Martin Lill, Harri Lill, Siim Sildnik, Fred Randver, alternates: Ingar Mäesalu, Jan Anderson	"Bullseye": Vladimir Jakovlev, Mihhail Vlassov, Janis Kiziridi, Konstantin Dotsenko, alternate: Erkki Lill	"Rolling Stones"; Andres Jakobson, Karl Kukner, Aleksandr Vaganov, Sven Petermann, alternates: Leo Jakobson, Margus Tubalkain
2015	January 30 – February 8 Tallinn	"Puhastusimport": Martin Lill, Ingar Mäesalu, Andres Jakobson, Jan Anderson, alternates: Tanel Toomväli, Johan Karlson	"220 Energia": Karl Kukner, Eiko-Siim Peips, Konstantin Dotsenko, Erkki Lill, alternates: Vladimir Jakovlev, Martin Leedo	"Jeti"; Sander Rõuk, Siim Sildnik, Robert-Kent Päll, Harri Lill, alternates: Fred Randver, Arne Karl Sternfeld
2016	January 29 – February 7 Tallinn	"Puhastusimport": Martin Lill, Ingar Mäesalu, Johan Karlson, Tanel Toomväli, alternate: Jan Anderson	"Jeti"; Harri Lill, Siim Sildnik, Sander Rõuk, Arne Karl Sternfeld, coach: Brian Gray	"Energia 220": Erkki Lill, Karl Kukner, Ronald Andla, Konstantin Dontsenko, alternate: Chris Roosaar, coach: Sulev Lokk
2017	January 28 – February 5 Tallinn	"CC Tallinn"; Harri Lill, Siim Sildnik, Sten Andreas Ehrlich, Kaarel Holm	"Puhastusimport": Martin Lill, Tanel Toomväli, Jan Anderson, Tarmo Vahesoo	"Team Jakovlev": Mihhail Vlassov, Janis Kiziridi, Vladimir Jakovlev, Eduard Jakovlev
2018	January 25–28; Tallinn	"CC Tallinn"; Harri Lill, Siim Sildnik, Sten Andreas Ehrlich, Kaarel Holm	"Cutform": Mihhail Vlassov, Eduard Veltsman, Andres Jakobson, Janis Kiziridi	"CC Arenaria": Erkki Lill, Tarmo Vahesoo, Jan Anderson, Jarl Guštšin
2019	May 9–12; Tallinn	"Team Lill"; Harri Lill, Karl Kukner, Tanel Toomväli, Tarvin Kaldvee, alternate: Arne Karl Sternfeld, coach: Kristian Lindström	"Team Veltsman": Eduard Veltsman, Andres Jakobson, Janis Kiziridi, Igor Dzenzeljuk, alternate: Mihhail Vlassov, coach: Vladimir Jakovlev	"Team Vähesoo": Tarmo Vähesoo, Olari Kalvik, Valvo Vooremaa, Siim Sein, alternate: Erkki Lill
2020	January 30 – February 1 Tallinn	"Team Veltsman": Eduard Veltsman, Mihhail Vlassov, Janis Kiziridi, Igor Dzenzeljuk, alternate: Erkki Lill, coach: Vladimir Jakovlev	"Team Jakobson": Andres Jakobson, Harri Lill, Tanel Toomväli, Karl Kukner, alternate: Ingar Mäesalu	"Team Kalvik": Olari Kalvik, Siim Sein, Valvo Vooremaa, Aleksander Andre, alternate: Margus Tubalkain
2021	January 28–31; Tallinn	"Team Veltsman": Eduard Veltsman, Mihhail Vlassov, Janis Kiziridi, Igor Dzenzeljuk, alternate: Erkki Lill, coach: Vladimir Jakovlev	"Team Vähesoo": Tarmo Vähesoo, Olari Kalvik, Siim Sein, Aleksander Andre, alternate: Andres Jakobson, coach: Margus Tubalkain	"Team Lill": Harri Lill, Tanel Toomväli, Karl Kukner, Tarvin Kaldvee
2022	April 7–10; Tallinn	"Team Veltsman": Mihhail Vlassov, Eduard Veltsman, Janis Kiziridi, Igor Dzenzeljuk, alternate: Konstantin Dotsenko	"Team Jakobson": Andres Jakobson, Siim Sein, Olari Kalvik, Aleksander Andre	"Team Holm": Kaarel Holm, Karl Kukner, Tanel Toomväli, Tarvin Kaldvee
2023	January 12–15; Tallinn	"Team Veltsman": Mihhail Vlassov, Eduard Veltsman, Janis Kiziridi, Igor Dzenzeljuk, alternate: Konstantin Dotsenko	"Team Holm": Kaarel Holm, Karl Kukner, Tanel Toomväli, Tarvin Kaldvee	"Team Jakobson": Andres Jakobson, Siim Sein, Olari Kalvik, Aleksander Andre
2024	February 1–14; Tallinn	"Team Veltsman": Eduard Veltsman, Janis Kiziridi, Konstantin Dotsenko, Igor Dzenzeljuk, alternate: Aleksander Andre	"Team Holm": Marten Padama, Karl Kukner, Tanel Toomväli, Kaarel Holm, alternate: Tarvin Kaldvee	"Team Jakobson": Andres Jakobson, Siim Sein, Olari Kalvik, Henry Grünberg, alternate: Tarmo Vähesoo
2025	January 31–February 2 Tallinn	Eduard Veltsman, Mihhail Vlassov, Janis Kiziridi, Igor Dzenzeljuk	Erkki Lill, Karl Kukner, Siim Sein, Olev Gudovski, alternate: Andrus Vall, coach: Tomi Rantamäki	Margus Tubalkain, Tiit Kaart, Jaanus Jegorov, Tonis Turmann
2026	April 2 - April 5	"Team Lill": Olari Kalvik, Andres Jakobson, Siim Sein, Erkki Lill, alternate: Andrus Vall, coach: Markku Uusipaavalniemi	"Team Holm": Kaarel Holm, Henry Grünberg, Tanel Toomväli, Karl Kukner	"Team Veltsman": Igor Dzendzeljuk, Konstantin Dotsenko, Mihhail Vlassov, Eduard Veltsman, alternate: Aleksandr Andre, coach: Janis Kiziridi

== Medal record for skips ==
(as of 2022; placement for skips only)

Skip	Gold	Silver	Bronze
Martin Lill	7	3	2
Eduard Veltsman	5	1	
Harri Lill	4	2	1
Erkki Lill	4	1	3
Vladimir Jakovlev	1	3	4
Andres Jakobson		2	3
Kaarel Holm		2	1
Leo Jakobson		1	2
Tarmo Vähesoo		1	1
Karl Kukner		1	
Tanel Toomväli		1	
Mihhail Vlassov		1	
Olari Kalvik			1
Jaanus Lindre			1
Sander Rõuk			1

== See also ==
- Estonian Women's Curling Championship
- Estonian Mixed Curling Championship
- Estonian Mixed Doubles Curling Championship
