= Estonian Mixed Doubles Curling Championship =

The Estonian Mixed Doubles Curling Championship (Estonian: Eesti meistrivõistlused segapaaride kurlingus) is the national championship of mixed doubles curling (one man and one woman) in Estonia. It has been held annually since the 2007–2008 season, and is organized by the Estonian Curling Association.

== List of champions and medallists ==
Team line-ups shows in order: woman, man, coach (if exists).

Year	Dates Host city	Champion	Runner-up	Bronze
2008 (1)	March ...–31; Tallinn	W: Marju Velga; M: Jan Anderson	W: Anne-Liis Leht; M: Fred Randver	W: Maile Mölder; M: Erkki Lill
2008 (2)	October ...–26; Tallinn	W: Kristiine Lill; M: Martin Lill	W: Reet Taidre; M: Andres Jakobson	W: Maarja Koll; M: Erkki Lill
2009	November ...–1; Tallinn	W: Kristiine Lill; M: Martin Lill	W: Maile Mölder; M: Erkki Lill	W: Marju Velga; M: Jan Anderson
2010	November 12–15; Tallinn	W: Jelizaveta Dmitrijeva; M: Mihhail Vlassov	W: Küllike Ustav; M: Andres Jakobson	W: Liisa Turmann; M: Erkki Lill
2011	November 11–13; Tallinn	W: Kristiine Lill; M: Martin Lill	W: Maile Mölder; M: Erkki Lill	W: Küllike Ustav; M: Andres Jakobson
2012	November 16–18; Tallinn	W: Kristiine Lill; M: Martin Lill	W: Maile Mölder; M: Erkki Lill	W: Küllike Ustav; M: Andres Jakobson
2013	December 6–8; Tallinn	W: Maile Mölder; M: Erkki Lill	W: Johanna Ehatamm; M: Harri Lill	W: Kristiine Lill; M: Martin Lill
2015	January ...–18; Tallinn	W: Maile Mölder; M: Erkki Lill	W: Küllike Ustav; M: Andres Jakobson	W: Liisa Turmann; M: Harri Lill
2016	December ...–13; 2015; Tallinn	W: Marie Turmann; M: Harri Lill	W: Maile Mölder; M: Erkki Lill	W: Kristiine Lill; M: Martin Lill; W: Triin Madisson; M: Sander Rõuk
2017	February 23–27; Tallinn	W: Maile Mölder; M: Erkki Lill	W: Marie Turmann; M: Harri Lill	W: Kristiine Lill; M: Martin Lill
2018	February 22–25; Tallinn	W: Marie Turmann; M: Harri Lill	W: Gerli Kägi; M: Erkki Lill	W: Triin Madisson; M: Karl Kukner
2019	February ...–23; Tallinn	W: Marie Turmann; M: Harri Lill	W: Triin Madisson; M: Karl Kukner	W: Liisa Turmann; M: Andres Jakobson
2020	February ...–22; Tallinn	W: Marie Turmann; M: Harri Lill	W: Triin Madisson; M: Karl Kukner	W: Marcella Tammes; M: Erkki Lill; C: Siim Sein
2021	February 18–21; Tallinn	W: Marie Turmann; M: Harri Lill	W: Triin Madisson; M: Karl Kukner	W: Liisa Turmann; M: Siim Sein
2022	March 17–20; Tallinn	W: Marie Kaldvee; M: Harri Lill	W: Triin Madisson; M: Karl Kukner	W: Kaidi Elmik; M: Mihhail Vlassov
2023	February 23–27; Tallinn	W: Marie Kaldvee; M: Harri Lill	W: Kaidi Elmik; M: Mihhail Vlassov	W: Ingrid Novikova; M: Andres Jakobson
2024	February 29–March 3 Tallinn	W: Marie Kaldvee; M: Harri Lill	W: Kaidi Elmik; M: Karl Kukner	W: Karoliine Kaare; M: Marten Padama
2025	February 27–March 2 Tallinn	W: Marie Kaldvee; M: Harri Lill	W: Triin Madisson; M: Karl Kukner	W: Karoliine Kaare; M: Marten Padama
2026	March 19–22; Tallinn	W: Marie Kaldvee; M: Harri Lill	W: Hettel Weddro; M: Aleksander Andre	W: Triin Madisson; M: Karl Kukner

== Medal record for curlers ==
Curler	Gold	Silver	Bronze
Harri Lill	10	2	1
Marie Kaldvee (Turmann)	10	1	
Kristiine Lill	4		3
Martin Lill	4		3
Erkki Lill	3	5	4
Maile Mölder	3	4	1
Mihhail Vlassov	1	1	1
Jan Anderson	1		1
Marju Velga	1		1
Jelizaveta Dmitrijeva	1		
Karl Kukner		6	2
Triin Madisson		5	3
Andres Jakobson		3	4
Küllike Ustav		2	2
Kaidi Elmik		2	1
Johanna Ehatamm		1	
Gerli Kägi		1	
Anne-Liis Leht		1	
Fred Randver		1	
Reet Taidre		1	
Liisa Turmann			4
Karoliine Kaare			2
Marten Padama			2
Maarja Koll			1
Sander Rõuk			1
Siim Sein			1
Marcella Tammes			1
Ingrid Novikova			1

== See also ==
- Estonian Men's Curling Championship
- Estonian Women's Curling Championship
- Estonian Mixed Curling Championship
