= Martin Lill =

Estonian curler and coach (born 1972)

- Curler ♂
- Born: 23 April 1972 (age 54); Tallinn, then part of Estonian SSR, Soviet Union

Team
- Curling club: Jeti Spordiklubi, Tallinn, CC Pumastusimport, Tallinn
- Mixed doubles partner: Kristiine Lill

Curling career
- Member Association: Estonia
- World Mixed Doubles Championship: 4 (2009, 2010, 2012, 2013)
- European Championship: 9 (2004, 2005, 2007, 2010, 2012, 2013, 2014, 2015, 2016)
- Other appearances: World Mixed Championship: 1 (2015), European Mixed Championship: 3 (2005, 2006, 2007)
Medal record
Curling
Estonian Men's Curling Championship
Gold medal – first place	2005 Tallinn
Gold medal – first place	2007 Tallinn
Gold medal – first place	2012 Tallinn
Gold medal – first place	2013 Tallinn
Gold medal – first place	2014 Tallinn
Gold medal – first place	2015 Tallinn
Gold medal – first place	2016 Tallinn
Silver medal – second place	2008 Tallinn
Silver medal – second place	2009 Tallinn
Silver medal – second place	2011 Tallinn
Silver medal – second place	2017 Tallinn
Bronze medal – third place	2006 Tallinn
Bronze medal – third place	2010 Tallinn

Martin Lill (born 23 April 1972 in Tallinn) is an Estonian curler and curling coach.

At the national level, he is a seven-time Estonian men's champion curler (2005, 2007, 2012, 2013, 2014, 2015, 2016), a four-time Estonian mixed champion curler (2005, 2006, 2007, 2016) and a four-time Estonian mixed doubles champion curler (2008, 2009, 2011, 2012).

== Teams ==
=== Men's ===
Season	Skip	Third	Second	Lead	Alternate	Coach	Events
2004–05	Ingar Mäesalu	Agu Lellep	Martin Lill	Leo Jakobson	Andres Villomann		ECC 2004 (21st)
2005–06	Martin Lill	Jan Anderson	Erkki Lill	Toomas Lill	Ingar Mäesalu	Kristiine Lill, Maile Mölder	ECC 2005 (15th)
2007–08	Martin Lill	Jan Anderson	Siim Sildnik	Ingar Mäesalu	Toomas Lill	Kristiine Lill	ECC 2007 (26th)
2010–11	Martin Lill	Siim Sildnik	Ingar Mäesalu	Jan Anderson	Harri Lill	Kristiine Lill	ECC 2010 (20th)
2012–13	Martin Lill	Ingar Mäesalu	Harri Lill	Jan Anderson	Siim Sildnik	Kristiine Lill	ECC 2012 (18th)
2013–14	Martin Lill	Harri Lill	Siim Sildnik	Ingar Mäesalu	Fred Randver	Fred Randver	ECC 2013 (15th)
2014–15	Martin Lill	Harri Lill	Siim Sildnik	Fred Randver	Robert-Kent Päll	Robert-Kent Päll	ECC 2014 (20th)
2015–16	Martin Lill	Ingar Mäesalu	Andres Jakobson	Johan Karlson	Tanel Toomväli		ECC 2015 (26th)
2016–17	Martin Lill	Ingar Mäesalu	Johan Karlson	Tanel Toomväli		Graeme Adam	ECC 2016 (23rd)
2016–17	Martin Lill (fourth)	Tanel Toomväli (skip)	Jan Anderson	Tarmo Vahesoo			EstMCC 2017 (silver)

=== Mixed ===
Season	Skip	Third	Second	Lead	Alternate	Events
2005–06	Martin Lill	Kristiine Lill	Jan Anderson	Anneli Sinirand	Ingar Mäesalu, Siret Voll	EMxCC 2005 (10th)
2006–07	Martin Lill	Ööle Janson	Jan Anderson	Marju Velga	Siim Sildnik, Kristiine Lill	EMxCC 2006 (13th)
2007–08	Martin Lill	Ööle Janson	Jan Anderson	Kristiine Lill	Marju Velga	EMxCC 2007 (8th)
2015–16	Martin Lill	Kristiine Lill	Siim Sildnik	Kerli Laidsalu		WMxCC 2015 (17th)

=== Mixed doubles ===
Season	Female	Male	Coach	Events
2008–09	Kristiine Lill	Martin Lill		WMDCC 2009 (14th)
2009–10	Kristiine Lill	Martin Lill	Toomas Lill	WMDCC 2010 (8th)
2011–12	Kristiine Lill	Martin Lill		WMDCC 2012 (8th)
2012–13	Kristiine Lill	Martin Lill		WMDCC 2013 (15th)
2016–17	Kristiine Lill	Martin Lill		EstMDCC 2017 (bronze)

== Record as a coach of national teams ==
Year	Tournament, event	National team	Place
2005	2005 European Curling Championships	Estonia (women)	19
2007	2007 European Curling Championships	Estonia (women)	17
2008	2008 European Curling Championships	Estonia (men)	22
2008	2008 European Curling Championships	Estonia (women)	16
2009	2009 European Curling Championships	Estonia (women)	18
2011	2011 European Curling Championships	Estonia (men)	16
2012	2012 European Junior Curling Challenge	Estonia (junior men)	4
2012	2012 European Junior Curling Challenge	Estonia (junior women)	4
2013	2013 European Junior Curling Challenge	Estonia (junior men)	4
2013	2013 European Junior Curling Challenge	Estonia (junior women)	6
2014	2014 European Junior Curling Challenge	Estonia (junior men)	12
2014	2014 European Junior Curling Challenge	Estonia (junior women)	8
2015	2015 World Junior Curling Championships	Estonia (junior women)	8
2017	2017 World Mixed Doubles Curling Championship	Estonia (mixed doubles)	32
