= Katie McMillan =

Scottish curler (born 2001)

- Curler
- Born: January 8, 2001 (age 25); Dumfries, Scotland

Team
- Curling club: Dumfries Ice Bowl, Dumfries, SCO
- Skip: Fay Henderson
- Third: Lisa Davie
- Second: Laura Watt
- Lead: Katie McMillan
- Alternate: Sophie Sinclair
- Mixed doubles partner: Angus Bryce

Curling career
- Member Association: Scotland
- World Championship: 1 (2026)
- World Mixed Doubles Championship: 1 (2026)
- World Mixed Championship: 1 (2019)
- European Championship: 1 (2026)
- World Junior Curling Championship: 1 (2022)
Medal record
Scottish Women's Championship
| Gold medal – first place | 2024 Dumfries |
| Gold medal – first place | 2025 Dumfries |
| Gold medal – first place | 2026 Dumfries |
| Silver medal – second place | 2022 Dumfries |
| Bronze medal – third place | 2020 Perth |
Scottish Mixed Doubles Championship
| Gold medal – first place | 2025–26 Aberdeen |
| Silver medal – second place | 2026–27 Aberdeen |
| Bronze medal – third place | 2022 Perth |
| Bronze medal – third place | 2025 Aberdeen |

Katie McMillan (born January 8, 2001 in Dumfries) is a Scottish curler from Glasgow. She currently plays lead on Team Fay Henderson. She is a three-time Scottish women's champion.

== Career ==
=== Juniors ===
McMillan won the Scottish Schools Curling Championship in 2015 while attending Stranraer Academy. In 2019, while playing second for Beth Farmer, she represented Scotland at the 2019 World Junior-B Curling Championships. There, the Scottish team won all nine of their games to claim gold and qualify the country for the 2019 World Junior Curling Championships. McMillan, however, did not compete at the World Championships.

After back-to-back silver and bronze performances at the Scottish Junior Curling Championships, McMillan captured the national junior title in 2021 as third for Fay Henderson. This qualified the team, with second Lisa Davie and lead Holly Wilkie-Milne, for the 2022 World Junior Curling Championships. There, the team had mixed results, finishing 3–6 and not advancing to the playoff round. Also during the 2021–22 season, Team Henderson had an impressive performance at the 2022 Scottish Women's Curling Championship, qualifying for the playoffs with a 7–2 record and defeating Amy MacDonald to reach the final. There, they were defeated 8–4 by Rebecca Morrison, settling for silver.

=== Women's ===
Out of juniors, McMillan joined her longtime junior skip Beth Farmer at front-end for the 2022–23 season alongside Hailey Duff, Kristin Bousie and Amy MacDonald. The team saw limited success, failing to qualify in every tour event they played. While they did earn enough points to play in the 2022 Tour Challenge Tier 2 Grand Slam of Curling event, they lost all four of their games and were eliminated at 0–4. The following season, Farmer and Bousie both left the rink and Fay Henderson took over as their new skip. This squad yielded slightly better results as the team won the Aberdeen Classic in December 2023 and reached the quarterfinals at the 2023 Oslo Cup. Despite their mixed tour season, Team Henderson was the class of the field at the 2024 Scottish women's championship, finishing the event 11–1 and downing Rebecca Morrison 9–2 in the championship game.

For the 2024–25 season, Team Henderson added Robyn Munro at third and Lisa Davie to the front-end to become a five-player team following the departure of Amy MacDonald. This season on tour, the team had a hot start, defeating Italy's Stefania Constantini in the final of the 2024 Euro Super Series to claim their first tour win. They also reached the semifinal round at the 2024 Women's Masters Basel, Stu Sells 1824 Halifax Classic and the 2025 International Bernese Ladies Cup. With a successful tour season under their belts, Team Henderson capped off the year by defending their Scottish women's title, again defeating Team Morrison in the championship game. Despite back-to-back wins at the national championship, Team Morrison was chosen to represent the country at both the 2024 and 2025 World Curling Championships.

After just one season, Robyn Munro left Team Henderson and the lineup changed again, this time with Lisa Davie moving to third while Laura Watt was added at alternate. On tour, the team saw slightly less success from the prior year, finishing runner-up at the WCT Tallinn Ladies Challenger and reaching one additional semifinal at the 2025 Tour Challenge U25 Grand Slam. They also played in the Tier 2 side of the 2025 Masters, however, finished 0–4. In the new year, the team again turned things around with an undefeated run to capture their third consecutive Scottish women's crown. This time, they were chosen to represent Scotland at the 2026 World Women's Curling Championship as Team Morrison was ineligible due to competing at the 2026 Winter Olympics.

=== Mixed doubles ===
McMillan first found success in mixed doubles at the 2022 Scottish Mixed Doubles Curling Championship. Playing with Mark Watt, the pair reached the semifinal round before being eliminated Jennifer Dodds and Bruce Mouat. After missing the playoffs the next two years, McMillan returned to the podium with Angus Bryce in 2025, dropping the semifinal game 7–6 to Sophie Jackson and Duncan McFadzean. The following year, she and Bryce won their first national title by beating Lisa Davie and former teammate Mark Watt 9–6 in the championship game.

=== Mixed ===
McMillan represented Scotland at the 2019 World Mixed Curling Championship, playing lead on the team skipped by Luke Carson. With third Kristin Bousie and second Mark Taylor, the team finished 7–0 through the round robin to earn a spot in the playoffs. They then defeated Turkey before being eliminated by Germany in the quarterfinals.

== Personal life ==
McMillan is employed as a gym membership advisor and personal trainer. She previously attended Stranraer Academy.

== Teams ==
| Season | Skip | Third | Second | Lead | Alternate |
|---|---|---|---|---|---|
| 2015–16 | Ellie Hamilton | Layla Al-Saffar | Katie McMillan | Nicola Joiner | |
| 2016–17 | Beth Farmer | Kristin Bousie | Katie McMillan | Nicola Joiner | Alexandra MacKintosh |
| 2017–18 | Beth Farmer | Kristin Bousie | Katie McMillan | Nicola Joiner | |
| 2018–19 | Beth Farmer | Kristin Bousie | Katie McMillan | Nicola Joiner | |
| 2019–20 | Beth Farmer | Kristin Bousie | Katie McMillan | Nicola Joiner | |
| 2020–21 | Beth Farmer | Kristin Bousie | Katie McMillan | Nicola Joiner | |
| 2021–22 | Fay Henderson | Katie McMillan | Lisa Davie | Holly Wilkie-Milne | |
| 2022–23 | Beth Farmer | Hailey Duff | Kristin Bousie | Katie McMillan | Amy MacDonald |
| 2023–24 | Fay Henderson | Hailey Duff | Amy MacDonald | Katie McMillan | |
| 2024–25 | Fay Henderson | Robyn Munro | Hailey Duff | Katie McMillan | Lisa Davie |
| 2025–26 | Fay Henderson | Lisa Davie | Hailey Duff | Katie McMillan | Laura Watt |
| 2026–27 | Fay Henderson | Lisa Davie | Laura Watt | Katie McMillan | Sophie Sinclair |
