= Erkki Lill =

Estonian curler and coach (born 1968)

- Curler ♂
- Born: 24 April 1968 (age 58); Tallinn, then part of Estonian SSR, Soviet Union

Team
- Curling club: Jeti Spordiklubi, Tallinn

Curling career
- Member Association: Estonia
- World Mixed Doubles Championship: 3 (2014, 2015, 2017)
- European Championship: 4 (2005, 2008, 2009, 2011)
- Other appearances: World Mixed Championship: 1 (2019), European Mixed Championship: 5 (2009, 2011, 2012, 2013, 2014)
Medal record
Curling
Estonian Men's Curling Championship
Gold medal – first place	2005 Tallinn
Gold medal – first place	2008 Tallinn
Gold medal – first place	2009 Tallinn
Gold medal – first place	2010 Tallinn
Gold medal – first place	2011 Tallinn
Gold medal – first place	2020 Tallinn
Gold medal – first place	2026 Tallinn
Silver medal – second place	2007 Tallinn
Silver medal – second place	2014 Tallinn
Silver medal – second place	2015 Tallinn
Silver medal – second place	2025 Tallinn
Bronze medal – third place	2006 Tallinn
Bronze medal – third place	2013 Tallinn
Bronze medal – third place	2016 Tallinn
Bronze medal – third place	2018 Tallinn
Bronze medal – third place	2019 Tallinn

Erkki Lill (born 24 April 1968 in Tallinn) is an Estonian curler and curling coach.

At the national level, he is a six-time Estonian men's champion curler (2005, 2008, 2009, 2010, 2011, 2020), a five-time Estonian mixed champion curler (2009, 2011, 2012, 2013, 2014) and a three-time Estonian mixed doubles champion curler (2013, 2015, 2017).

Out of curling, he competed as marathon runner.

== Teams ==
=== Men's ===
Season	Skip	Third	Second	Lead	Alternate	Coach	Events
2005–06	Martin Lill	Jan Anderson	Erkki Lill	Toomas Lill	Ingar Mäesalu	Kristiine Lill, Maile Mölder	ECC 2005 (15th)
2008–09	Erkki Lill	Harri Lill	Jaanus Lindre	Indrek Ernits	Tanel Telliskivi	Martin Lill	ECC 2008 (22nd)
2008–09	Erkki Lill	Harri Lill	Jaanus Lindre	Toomas Lill	Tanel Telliskivi		
2009–10	Erkki Lill	Harri Lill	Jaanus Lindre	Toomas Lill	Tanel Telliskivi		ECC 2009 (17th)
2011–12	Harri Lill	Erkki Lill	Jaanus Lindre	Tanel Telliskivi		Martin Lill	ECC 2011 (16th)
2016–17	Erkki Lill	Tarmo Vahesoo	Jan Anderson	Jarl Guštšin	Olari Kalvik		
2017–18	Erkki Lill	Tarmo Vahesoo	Jan Anderson	Jarl Guštšin	Olari Kalvik		EstMCC 2018 (bronze)
2019–20	Eduard Veltsman	Mihhail Vlassov	Igor Dzenzeljuk	Erkki Lill			EstMCC 2020 (???th)

=== Mixed ===
Season	Skip	Third	Second	Lead	Alternate	Coach	Events
2009–10	Erkki Lill	Maile Mölder	Harri Lill	Maarja Koll	Küllike Ustav	Toomas Lill	EMxCC 2009 (17th)
2011–12	Erkki Lill	Maile Mölder	Harri Lill	Kaja Liik-Tamm			EMxCC 2011 (17th)
2012–13	Erkki Lill	Maile Mölder	Andres Jakobson	Küllike Ustav			EMxCC 2012 (11th)
2013–14	Erkki Lill	Maile Mölder	Harri Lill	Küllike Ustav			EMxCC 2013 (22nd)
2014–15	Erkki Lill	Maile Mölder	Siim Sildnik	Marie Turmann			EMxCC 2014 (12th)
2019–20	Erkki Lill	Triin Madisson	Mihhail Vlassov	Kaidi Elmik			WMxCC 2019 (29th)

=== Mixed doubles ===
Season	Female	Male	Coach	Events
2013–14	Maile Mölder	Erkki Lill	Timo Kauste	WMDCC 2014 (22nd)
2014–15	Maile Mölder	Erkki Lill	Timo Kauste	WMDCC 2015 (5th)
2016–17	Maile Mölder	Erkki Lill	Martin Lill	EstMDCC 2017 (gold) , WMDCC 2017 (32nd)
2017–18	Gerli Kagi	Erkki Lill		EstMDCC 2018 (silver)

== Record as a coach of national teams ==
Year	Tournament, event	National team	Place
2005	2005 European Curling Championships	Estonia (women)	19
2006	2006 European Junior Curling Challenge	Estonia (junior men)	11
2007	2007 European Junior Curling Challenge	Estonia (junior men)	4
2009	2009 European Junior Curling Challenge	Estonia (junior men)	7
2012	2012 European Curling Championships	Estonia (women)	14
2013	2013 European Curling Championships	Estonia (women)	12
2014	2014 European Curling Championships	Estonia (women)	8
2015	2015 World Junior Curling Championships	Estonia (junior men)	10
2015	2015 World Wheelchair B Curling Championship	Estonia (wheelchair)	14
2015	2015 European Curling Championships	Estonia (women)	9
2016	2016 World Junior B Curling Championships	Estonia (junior men)	23
2016	2016 Winter Youth Olympics	Estonia (mixed)	14
2016	2016 Winter Youth Olympics	Estonia (mixed doubles)	17
2016	2016 Winter Youth Olympics	Estonia (mixed doubles)	9
2016	2016 World Mixed Doubles Curling Championship	Kazakhstan (mixed doubles)	38
2016	2016 World Wheelchair-B Curling Championship	Estonia (wheelchair)	5
2016	2016 European Curling Championships	Estonia (women)	13
2017	2017 World Junior B Curling Championships	Estonia (junior women)	13
2018	2018 World Junior B Curling Championships	Estonia (junior women)	9
2018	2018 World Wheelchair-B Curling Championship	Estonia (wheelchair)	1st place, gold medalist(s)
2019	2019 World Wheelchair Curling Championship	Estonia (wheelchair)	8
2019	2019 Pacific-Asia Curling Championships	Kazakhstan (men)	8
2019	2019 Pacific-Asia Curling Championships	Kazakhstan (women)	7
2019	2019 European Curling Championships	Latvia (men)	17
2019	2019 World Mixed Doubles Qualification Event	Kazakhstan (mixed doubles)	21
2019	2019 World Junior-B Curling Championships	Kazakhstan (junior men)	10
2019	2019 World Junior-B Curling Championships	Kazakhstan (junior women)	9
2020	2020 Winter Youth Olympics	Estonia (mixed)	21
