= Kristiine Lill =

Estonian curler and coach (born 1971)

- Curler ♀
- Born: 1 February 1971 (age 55)

Team
- Curling club: Jeti Spordiklubi, Tallinn, CC Pumastusimport, Tallinn

Curling career
- Member Association: Estonia
- World Mixed Doubles Championship: 4 (2009, 2010, 2012, 2013)
- European Championship: 10 (2005, 2007, 2008, 2009, 2010, 2011, 2012, 2013, 2015, 2016)
- Other appearances: World Mixed Championship: 1 (2015), European Mixed Championship: 3 (2005, 2006, 2007)
Medal record
Curling
Estonian Women's Curling Championship
Gold medal – first place	2007 Tallinn
Gold medal – first place	2009 Tallinn
Gold medal – first place	2011 Tallinn
Gold medal – first place	2012 Tallinn
Gold medal – first place	2013 Tallinn
Gold medal – first place	2014 Tallinn
Gold medal – first place	2015 Tallinn
Gold medal – first place	2016 Tallinn
Silver medal – second place	2006 Tallinn
Silver medal – second place	2008 Tallinn
Silver medal – second place	2010 Tallinn
Silver medal – second place	2017 Tallinn
Bronze medal – third place	2005 Tallinn

Kristiine Lill (born 1 February 1971) is an Estonian curler and curling coach.

At the national level, she is an eight-time Estonian women's champion curler (2007, 2009, 2011, 2012, 2013, 2014, 2015, 2016), a three-time Estonian mixed champion curler (2005, 2007, 2016) and a four-time Estonian mixed doubles champion curler (2008, 2009, 2011, 2012).

== Teams ==
=== Women's ===
Season	Skip	Third	Second	Lead	Alternate	Coach	Events
2005–06	Maile Mölder	Eve-Lyn Korka	Evelin Eiert	Marge Vaher	Kristiine Lill	Erkki Lill, Martin Lill	ECC 2005 (19th)
2007–08	Kristiine Lill	Ööle Janson	Katrin Kuusk	Marju Velga	Marje Kaljuvee	Martin Lill	ECC 2007 (17th)
2008–09	Kristiine Lill	Ööle Janson	Katrin Kuusk	Marju Velga		Martin Lill	ECC 2008 (16th)
2009–10	Ööle Janson	Kristiine Lill	Katrin Kuusk	Marju Velga		Martin Lill	ECC 2009 (18th)
2010–11	Küllike Ustav	Kristiine Lill	Liisa Turmann	Marie Turmann	Gerli Roosme	Harri Lill	ECC 2010 (17th)
2011–12	Kristiine Lill	Ööle Janson	Marju Velga	Marcella Tammes	Küllike Ustav	Urmas Berkmann	ECC 2011 (16th)
2012–13	Maile Mölder	Kristiine Lill	Küllike Ustav	Kaja Liik-Tamm		Erkki Lill	ECC 2012 (14th)
2012–13	Maile Mölder	Kristiine Lill	Küllike Ustav	Helen Nummert			
2013–14	Maile Mölder	Kristiine Lill	Helen Nummert	Küllike Ustav	Kaja Liik-Tamm	Erkki Lill	ECC 2013 (12th)
2013–14	Maile Mölder	Kristiine Lill	Küllike Ustav	Kaja Liik-Tamm	Helen Nummert		
2014–15	Maile Mölder	Kristiine Lill	Küllike Ustav	Marju Velga			
2015–16	Maile Mölder	Kristiine Lill	Küllike Ustav	Triin Madisson	Lembe Marley	Erkki Lill	ECC 2015 (9th)
2015–16	Maile Mölder	Kristiine Lill	Küllike Ustav	Marju Velga	Ööle Janson		
2016–17	Maile Mölder	Kristiine Lill	Triin Madisson	Lembe Marley		Erkki Lill	ECC 2016 (13th); EstWCC 2017 (silver)

=== Mixed ===
Season	Skip	Third	Second	Lead	Alternate	Events
2005–06	Martin Lill	Kristiine Lill	Jan Anderson	Anneli Sinirand	Ingar Mäesalu, Siret Voll	EMxCC 2005 (10th)
2006–07	Martin Lill	Ööle Janson	Jan Anderson	Marju Velga	Siim Sildnik, Kristiine Lill	EMxCC 2006 (13th)
2007–08	Martin Lill	Ööle Janson	Jan Anderson	Kristiine Lill	Marju Velga	EMxCC 2007 (8th)
2015–16	Martin Lill	Kristiine Lill	Siim Sildnik	Kerli Laidsalu		WMxCC 2015 (17th)

=== Mixed doubles ===
Season	Female	Male	Coach	Events
2008–09	Kristiine Lill	Martin Lill		WMDCC 2009 (14th)
2009–10	Kristiine Lill	Martin Lill	Toomas Lill	WMDCC 2010 (8th)
2011–12	Kristiine Lill	Martin Lill		WMDCC 2012 (8th)
2012–13	Kristiine Lill	Martin Lill		WMDCC 2013 (15th)
2016–17	Kristiine Lill	Martin Lill		EstMDCC 2017 (bronze)

== Record as a coach of national teams ==
Year	Tournament, event	National team	Place
2005	2005 European Curling Championships	Estonia (men)	15
2007	2007 European Curling Championships	Estonia (men)	26
2010	2010 European Curling Championships	Estonia (men)	20
2012	2012 European Curling Championships	Estonia (men)	18
