= Maile Mölder =

Estonian curler and coach (born 1977)

- Curler ♀
- Born: 23 July 1979 (age 47)

Team
- Curling club: Jeti Spordiklubi, Tallinn

Curling career
- Member Association: Estonia
- World Mixed Doubles Championship: 3 (2014, 2015, 2017)
- European Championship: 7 (2005, 2006, 2012, 2013, 2014, 2015, 2016)
- Other appearances: European Mixed Championship: 5 (2009, 2011, 2012, 2013, 2014)
Medal record
Curling
Estonian Women's Curling Championship
Gold medal – first place	2005 Tallinn
Gold medal – first place	2006 Tallinn
Gold medal – first place	2008 Tallinn
Gold medal – first place	2010 Tallinn
Gold medal – first place	2012 Tallinn
Gold medal – first place	2013 Tallinn
Gold medal – first place	2014 Tallinn
Gold medal – first place	2015 Tallinn
Gold medal – first place	2016 Tallinn
Silver medal – second place	2009 Tallinn
Silver medal – second place	2011 Tallinn
Silver medal – second place	2017 Tallinn
Silver medal – second place	2018 Tallinn
Silver medal – second place	2020 Tallinn
Bronze medal – third place	2007 Tallinn

Maile Mölder (born 23 July 1977) is an Estonian curler and curling coach.

At the national level, she is a nine-time Estonian women's champion curler (2005, 2006, 2008, 2010, 2012, 2013, 2014, 2015, 2016), a five-time Estonian mixed champion curler (2009, 2011, 2012, 2013, 2014) and a three-time Estonian mixed doubles champion curler (2013, 2015, 2017).

== Teams ==
=== Women's ===
Season	Skip	Third	Second	Lead	Alternate	Coach	Events
2005–06	Maile Mölder	Eve-Lyn Korka	Evelin Eiert	Marge Vaher	Kristiine Lill	Erkki Lill, Martin Lill	ECC 2005 (19th)
2006–07	Maile Mölder	Marge Vaher	Anne-Liis Leht	Margit Peebo			ECC 2006 (19th)
2012–13	Maile Mölder	Kristiine Lill	Küllike Ustav	Kaja Liik-Tamm		Erkki Lill	ECC 2012 (14th)
2013–14	Maile Mölder	Kristiine Lill	Helen Nummert	Küllike Ustav	Kaja Liik-Tamm	Erkki Lill	ECC 2013 (12th)
2014–15	Maile Mölder	Helen Nummert	Küllike Ustav	Marju Velga	Marie Turmann	Erkki Lill	ECC 2014 (8th)
2015–16	Maile Mölder	Kristiine Lill	Küllike Ustav	Triin Madisson	Lembe Marley	Erkki Lill	ECC 2015 (9th)
2016–17	Maile Mölder	Kristiine Lill	Triin Madisson	Lembe Marley		Erkki Lill	ECC 2016 (13th); EstWCC 2017 (silver)
2017–18	Maile Mölder	Triin Madisson	Kristin Laidsalu	Lembe Marley			EstWCC 2018 (silver)
2018–19	Maile Mölder	Lembe Marley	Britta Sillaots	Triin Madisson			

=== Mixed ===
Season	Skip	Third	Second	Lead	Alternate	Coach	Events
2009–10	Erkki Lill	Maile Mölder	Harri Lill	Maarja Koll	Küllike Ustav	Toomas Lill	EMxCC 2009 (17th)
2011–12	Erkki Lill	Maile Mölder	Harri Lill	Kaja Liik-Tamm			EMxCC 2011 (17th)
2012–13	Erkki Lill	Maile Mölder	Andres Jakobson	Küllike Ustav			EMxCC 2012 (11th)
2013–14	Erkki Lill	Maile Mölder	Harri Lill	Küllike Ustav			EMxCC 2013 (22nd)
2014–15	Erkki Lill	Maile Mölder	Siim Sildnik	Marie Turmann			EMxCC 2014 (12th)

=== Mixed doubles ===
Season	Female	Male	Coach	Events
2013–14	Maile Mölder	Erkki Lill	Timo Kauste	WMDCC 2014 (22nd)
2014–15	Maile Mölder	Erkki Lill	Timo Kauste	WMDCC 2015 (5th)
2016–17	Maile Mölder	Erkki Lill	Martin Lill	EstMDCC 2017 (gold); WMDCC 2017 (32nd)

== Record as a coach of national teams ==
Year	Tournament, event	National team	Place
2005	2005 European Curling Championships	Estonia (men)	15
