= Leo Jakobson =

Estonian curler (born 1953)

- Curler ♂
- Born: 23 September 1953 (age 73); Tartu, then part of Estonian SSR, Soviet Union

Curling career
- Member Association: Estonia
- European Championship: 2 (2004, 2006)
- Other appearances: European Mixed Championship: 2 (2008, 2010), World Senior Championships: 2 (2006, 2008)
Medal record
Curling
Estonian Men's Curling Championship
Silver medal – second place	2006 Tallinn
Bronze medal – third place	2012 Tallinn
Bronze medal – third place	2014 Tallinn

Leo Jakobson (born 23 September 1953) is an Estonian curler and sport personnel. He is the father of curling in Estonia.

He was born in Tartu. In 1977 he graduated from Estonian Agricultural University.

In 2000 he introduced curling in Estonia first time. He is also one of the founders of the first curling hall in Estonia. He has played curling since 2001. He has competed at the European Curling Championships. In 2010 he won Estonian championships. In 2004–2010 he was a member of Estonian national curling team.

In 2003–2014 he was a member of the board of Estonian Curling Association.
