= Erika Tuvike =

Estonian curler

- Curler
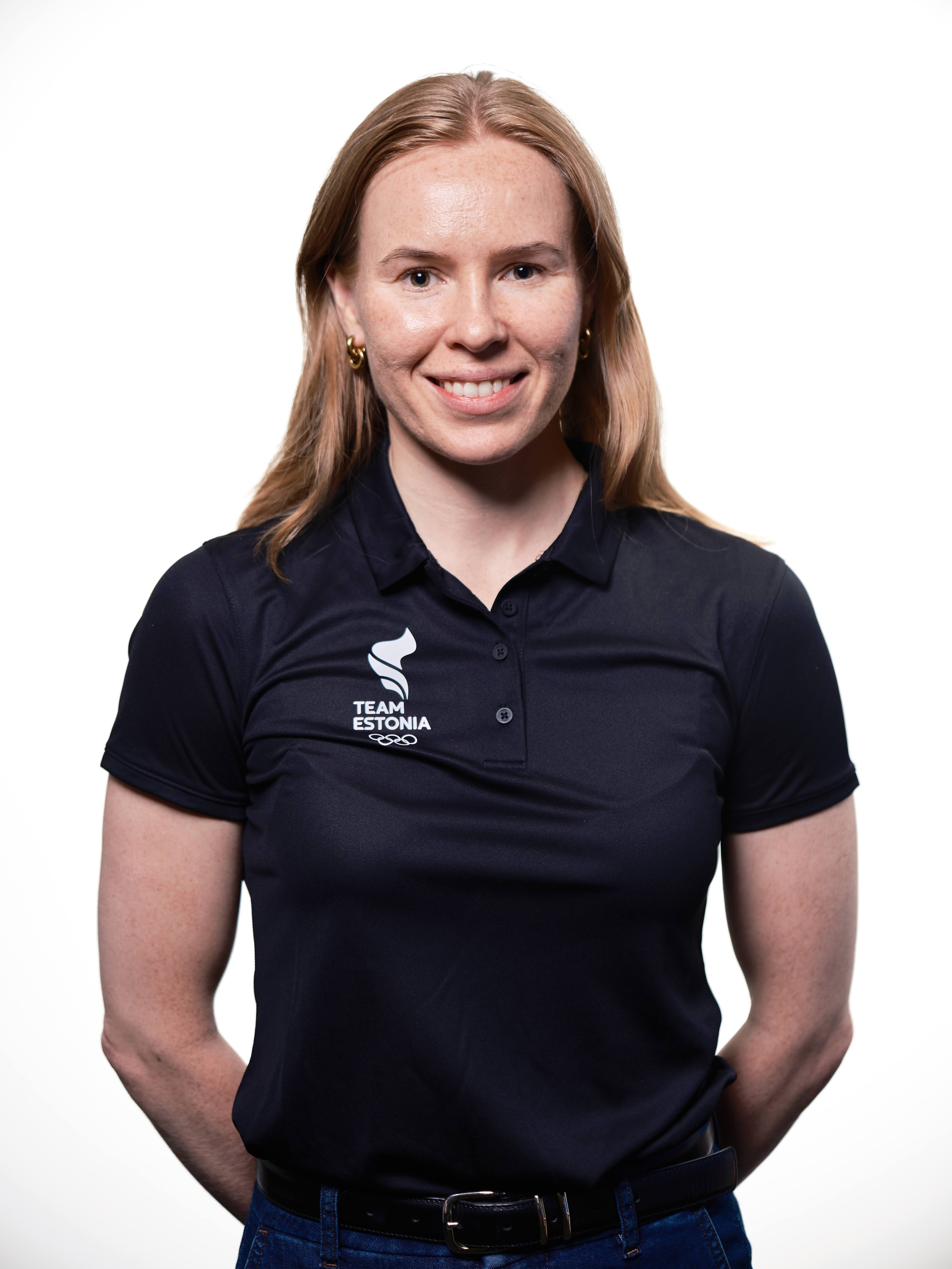
- Born: April 14, 1991 (age 35); Tallinn, Estonia

Team
- Curling club: Curling Tallinn, Tallinn, EST
- Skip: Liisa Turmann
- Fourth: Erika Tuvike
- Third: Kerli Laidsalu
- Lead: Heili Grossmann

Curling career
- Member Association: Estonia
- World Championship: 2 (2021, 2024)
- European Championship: 7 (2017, 2018, 2019, 2021, 2022, 2023, 2024)
Medal record
Women's curling
Estonian Women's Curling Championship
Gold medal – first place	2017 Tallinn
Gold medal – first place	2018 Tallinn
Gold medal – first place	2019 Tallinn
Gold medal – first place	2020 Tallinn
Gold medal – first place	2021 Tallinn
Gold medal – first place	2022 Tallinn
Gold medal – first place	2024 Tallinn

Erika Tuvike (born 14 April, 1991) is an Estonian curler. She currently throws fourth stones on the Estonian women's curling team, skipped by Liisa Turmann.

== Career ==
Tuvike played in her first international curling tournament at the 2016 World Mixed Curling Championship, playing lead on the team which was skipped by Kaarel Holm. The team finished the event with a 3–4 record in pool play, ranked 21st overall.

Tuvike joined the Turmann rink in 2016. In 2017, the team won their first Estonian Women's Curling Championship. The team represented Estonia at the 2017 European Curling Championships, where they finished in third place in the B Division. The team won the Estonian Women's National Championship once again in 2018. They represented Estonia at the 2018 European Curling Championships, where they finished in second place in the B Division. This qualified Estonia for the 2019 World Qualification Event for a chance to make it to the 2019 World Women's Curling Championship. At the Qualification event, the team could not make the playoffs, finishing with a 3–4 record. The team won their third national championship that season. Later on in 2019, the team won their first World Curling Tour event at the Tallinn Ladies International Challenger. A few weeks later, they represented Estonia at the 2019 European Curling Championships where they competed in the A Division. They finished with a 2–7 record, which qualified them for the 2020 World Qualification Event. There, they just missed the playoffs with a 4–3 record. The team won two more national championships in 2020 and 2021.

Due the COVID-19 pandemic, the field at the 2021 World Women's Curling Championship was expanded to 14 teams, after the 2020 World Women's Curling Championship was cancelled. The 2021 event was originally planned to be hosted by Switzerland, giving that nation an automatic entry. This gave Europe an extra qualification spot for the 2021 Worlds, which was based on the results of the 2019 European Championship, the last Euros held before the pandemic. As they had finished 8th, this qualified Estonia and the Turmann rink for the 2021 Worlds, the first time Estonia would play at the World Championships. At the World Championships, the team finished with a 1–12 record, in last place. Their lone win coming against Germany.

== Personal life ==
Tuvike is employed as a lawyer with Eversheds Sutherland. She has a law degree from the University of Tartu.
