= Heili Grossmann =

Estonian curler (born 1984)

- Curler
- Born: 23 November 1984 (age 41); Tartu, then part of Estonian SSR, Soviet Union

Team
- Curling club: Tallinn CC, Tallinn, EST
- Skip: Liisa Turmann
- Fourth: Erika Tuvike
- Third: Kerli Laidsalu
- Lead: Heili Grossmann

Curling career
- Member Association: Estonia
- World Championship: 2 (2021, 2024)
- European Championship: 6 (2017, 2018, 2019, 2021, 2023, 2024)
Medal record
Women's curling
Estonian Women's Curling Championship
Gold medal – first place	2019 Tallinn
Gold medal – first place	2020 Tallinn
Gold medal – first place	2021 Tallinn
Gold medal – first place	2022 Tallinn
Gold medal – first place	2024 Tallinn
Silver medal – second place	2013 Tallinn
Silver medal – second place	2015 Tallinn
Bronze medal – third place	2016 Tallinn

Heili Grossmann (born 23 November 1984 in Tartu) is an Estonian curler from Tallinn, Estonia. She currently plays lead on the Estonian women's curling team skipped by Liisa Turmann.

== Career ==
Grossmann competed in her first international event at the 2017 European Curling Championships where she served as alternate for the Marie Turmann rink. There, the team won the bronze medal in the B Division. Grossmann joined the Turmann team the following season as their second. Team Turmann had won the 2018 Estonian Women's Curling Championship, qualifying the team to represent Estonia at the 2018 European Curling Championships At the 2018 Euros, the team finished second in the B Division, losing in the final to Norway's Kristin Skaslien. This qualified Estonia for the 2019 World Qualification Event for a chance to make it to the 2019 World Women's Curling Championship. Grossmann did not compete at the qualification event, as she was replaced by Triin Madisson. In 2019, the team won their first World Curling Tour event at the Tallinn Ladies International Challenger. A few weeks later, the team once again represented Estonia at the 2019 European Curling Championships where they got to compete in the A Division. They finished with a 2–7 record, which qualified them once again for the 2020 World Qualification Event. There, they just missed the playoffs with a 4–3 record. The team won two more national championships in 2020 and 2021.

Due to the COVID-19 pandemic, the field at the 2021 World Women's Curling Championship was expanded to fourteen teams, after the 2020 World Women's Curling Championship was cancelled. The 2021 event was originally planned to be hosted by Switzerland, giving that nation an automatic entry. This gave Europe an extra qualification spot for the 2021 Worlds, which was based on the results of the 2019 European Championship, the last Euros held before the pandemic. As they had finished eighth, this qualified Estonia and the Turmann rink for the 2021 Worlds, the first time Estonia would play at the World Championships. At the World Championships, the team finished in last with a 1–12 record. Their lone win came against Germany.

== Personal life ==
Grossmann is employed a global human resources systems expert. She is married and has two children.

== Teams ==
Season	Skip	Third	Second	Lead	Alternate
2012–13	Anne-Liis Leht	Margit Peebo	Heili Grossmann	Ülle Lumiste	Tene Link
2014–15	Anne-Liis Leht	Heili Grossmann	Tene Link	Viktoria Rudenko	Margit Peebo
2015–16	Anne-Liis Leht	Viktoria Rudenko	Tene Link	Kaja Liik-Tamm	Heili Grossmann
2017–18	Marie Turmann	Kerli Laidsalu	Victoria-Laura Lõhmus	Erika Tuvike	Heili Grossmann
2018–19	Marie Turmann	Kerli Laidsalu	Heili Grossmann	Erika Tuvike	Liisa Turmann
2019–20	Marie Turmann	Kerli Laidsalu	Heili Grossmann	Erika Tuvike	Liisa Turmann
2020–21	Marie Turmann	Liisa Turmann	Heili Grossmann	Erika Tuvike	Kerli Laidsalu
2021–22	Kerli Laidsalu (Fourth)	Liisa Turmann (Skip)	Heili Grossmann	Erika Tuvike	Karoliine Kaare
2023–24	Erika Tuvike (Fourth)	Kerli Laidsalu	Liisa Turmann (Skip)	Heili Grossmann	
2024–25	Erika Tuvike (Fourth)	Kerli Laidsalu	Liisa Turmann (Skip)	Heili Grossmann	
