= Kerli Laidsalu =

Estonian curler (born 1995)

- Curler
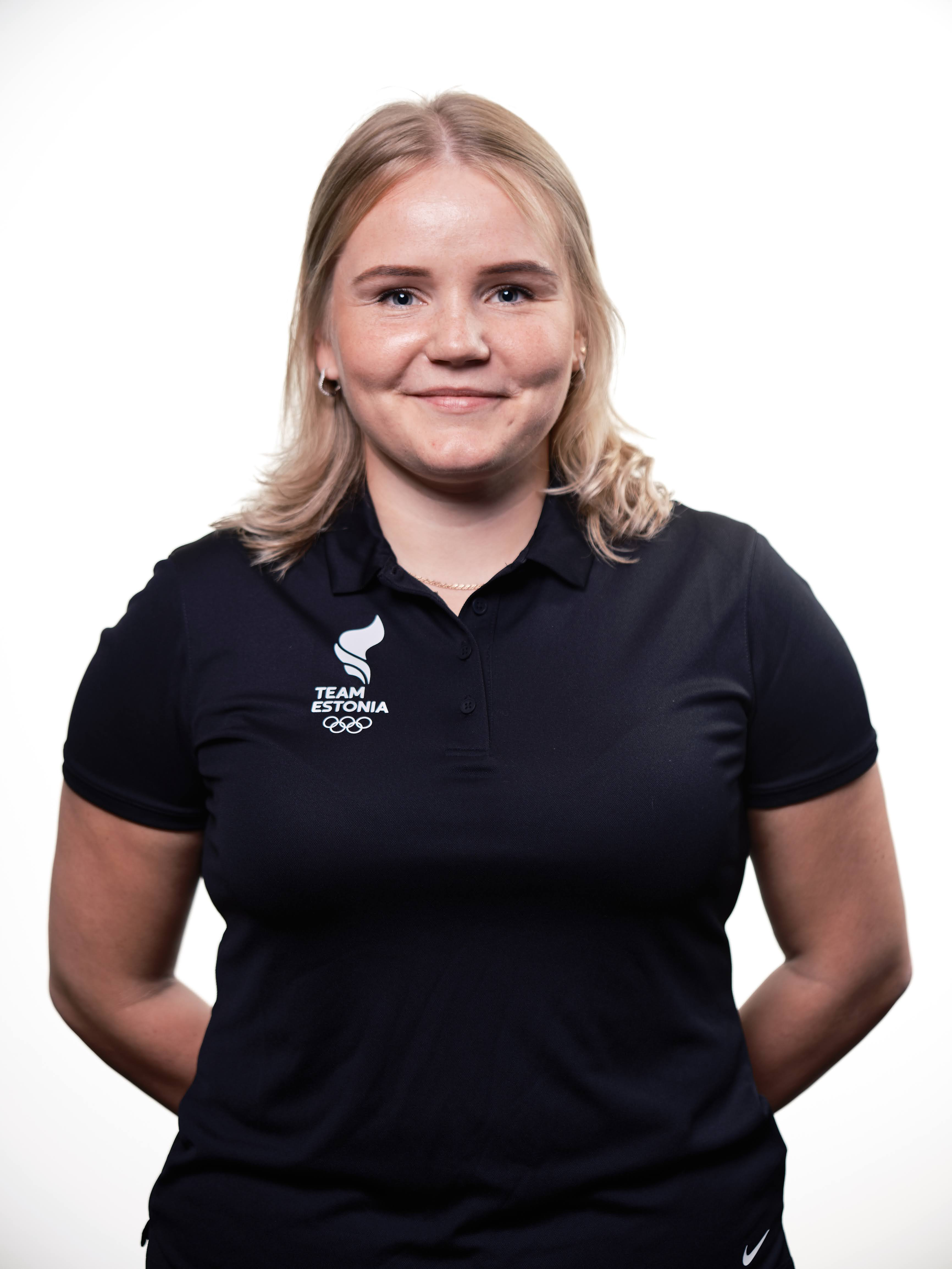
- Born: 22 January 1995 (age 31); Tallinn, Estonia

Team
- Curling club: Tallinn CC, Tallinn, EST
- Skip: Liisa Turmann
- Fourth: Erika Tuvike
- Third: Kerli Laidsalu
- Lead: Heili Grossmann

Curling career
- Member Association: Estonia
- World Championship: 2 (2021, 2024)
- European Championship: 7 (2017, 2018, 2019, 2021, 2022, 2023, 2024)
Medal record
Women's curling
Estonian Women's Curling Championship
Gold medal – first place	2018 Tallinn
Gold medal – first place	2019 Tallinn
Gold medal – first place	2020 Tallinn
Gold medal – first place	2021 Tallinn
Gold medal – first place	2022 Tallinn
Gold medal – first place	2024 Tallinn
Silver medal – second place	2016 Tallinn
Bronze medal – third place	2013 Tallinn
Bronze medal – third place	2014 Tallinn
Bronze medal – third place	2015 Tallinn

Kerli Laidsalu (born 22 January 1995) is an Estonian curler from Tallinn, Estonia. She currently plays third on the Estonian women's curling team skipped by Liisa Turmann.

== Career ==
=== Juniors ===
Laidsalu played in two European Junior Curling Challenge events during her junior career in 2013 and 2014. In 2013, her team finished with a 3–2 record and in 2014, they made the playoffs before losing to Italy in the quarterfinals.

In 2015, the Estonian junior women's team qualified for the 2015 World Junior Curling Championships where Laidsalu played second on the team skipped by Marie Turmann. At the tournament, the team finished in eighth with a 2–7 record. Because of their bottom three finish, they were relegated to the 2016 World Junior B Curling Championships in order to earn their spot at the 2016 World Junior Curling Championships. At the B tournament, they just missed out on qualifying for the Worlds, losing the bronze medal qualifying game to Hungary.

While still in juniors, Laidsalu played lead on the Estonian mixed team that represented Estonia at the 2015 World Mixed Curling Championship. Her team of Martin Lill, Kristiine Lill and Siim Sildnik finished in seventeenth place at the tournament with a 4–4 record.

=== Women's ===
Laidsalu competed in her first international women's level event at the 2017 European Curling Championships. There, the team won the bronze medal in the B Division. Later that season, Team Turmann won the 2018 Estonian Women's Curling Championship, qualifying them to represent Estonia at the 2018 European Curling Championships. At the 2018 Euros, the team finished second in the B Division, losing in the final to Norway's Kristin Skaslien. This qualified Estonia for the 2019 World Qualification Event for a chance to make it to the 2019 World Women's Curling Championship. At the Qualification Event, the team missed the playoffs with a 3–4 record. In November 2019, the team won their first World Curling Tour event at the Tallinn Ladies International Challenger. A few weeks later, the team once again represented Estonia at the 2019 European Curling Championships where they got to compete in the A Division. They finished with a 2–7 record, which qualified them once again for the 2020 World Qualification Event. There, they just missed the playoffs with a 4–3 record. The team won two more national championships in 2020 and 2021.

Due the COVID-19 pandemic, the field at the 2021 World Women's Curling Championship was expanded to fourteen teams, after the 2020 World Women's Curling Championship was cancelled. The 2021 event was originally planned to be hosted by Switzerland, giving that nation an automatic entry. This gave Europe an extra qualification spot for the 2021 Worlds, which was based on the results of the 2019 European Championship, the last Euros held before the pandemic. As they had finished eighth, this qualified Estonia and the Turmann rink for the 2021 Worlds, the first time Estonia would play at the World Championships. At the World Championships, the team finished in last with a 1–12 record. Their lone win came against Germany.

== Personal life ==
Laidsalu works as a human resources and marketing specialist with Birkle IT Estonia.

== Teams ==
Season	Skip	Third	Second	Lead	Alternate
2012–13	Marie Turmann	Liisa Turmann	Kädi Kurem	Kerli Laidsalu	Kerli Zirk; Johanna Ehatamm
2012–13	Marie Turmann	Kerli Zirk	Kerli Laidsalu	Kädi Kurem	Johanna Ehatamm
2013–14	Marie Turmann	Kerli Laidsalu	Kerli Zirk	Johanna Ehatamm	Liisa Turmann
2013–14	Marie Turmann	Kerli Zirk	Kerli Laidsalu	Johanna Ehatamm	Victoria-Laura Lõhmus
2014–15	Marie Turmann	Kerli Zirk	Kerli Laidsalu	Johanna Ehatamm	Liisa Turmann; Victoria-Laura Lõhmus
2015–16	Marie Turmann	Kerli Laidsalu	Liisa Turmann	Victoria-Laura Lõhmus	Johanna Ehatamm
2015–16	Marie Turmann	Kerli Laidsalu	Victoria-Laura Lõhmus	Johanna Ehatamm	Kristin Laidsalu
2017–18	Marie Turmann	Kerli Laidsalu	Victoria-Laura Lõhmus	Erika Tuvike	Heili Grossmann
2018–19	Marie Turmann	Kerli Laidsalu	Heili Grossmann	Erika Tuvike	Liisa Turmann
2019–20	Marie Turmann	Kerli Laidsalu	Heili Grossmann	Erika Tuvike	Liisa Turmann
2020–21	Marie Turmann	Liisa Turmann	Heili Grossmann	Erika Tuvike	Kerli Laidsalu
2021–22	Kerli Laidsalu (Fourth)	Liisa Turmann (Skip)	Heili Grossmann	Erika Tuvike	Karoliine Kaare
2022–23	Marie Kaldvee	Liisa Turmann	Kerli Laidsalu	Erika Tuvike	
2023–24	Erika Tuvike (Fourth)	Kerli Laidsalu	Liisa Turmann (Skip)	Heili Grossmann	
2024–25	Erika Tuvike (Fourth)	Kerli Laidsalu	Liisa Turmann (Skip)	Heili Grossmann	
