= Liisa Turmann =

Estonian curler

- Curler
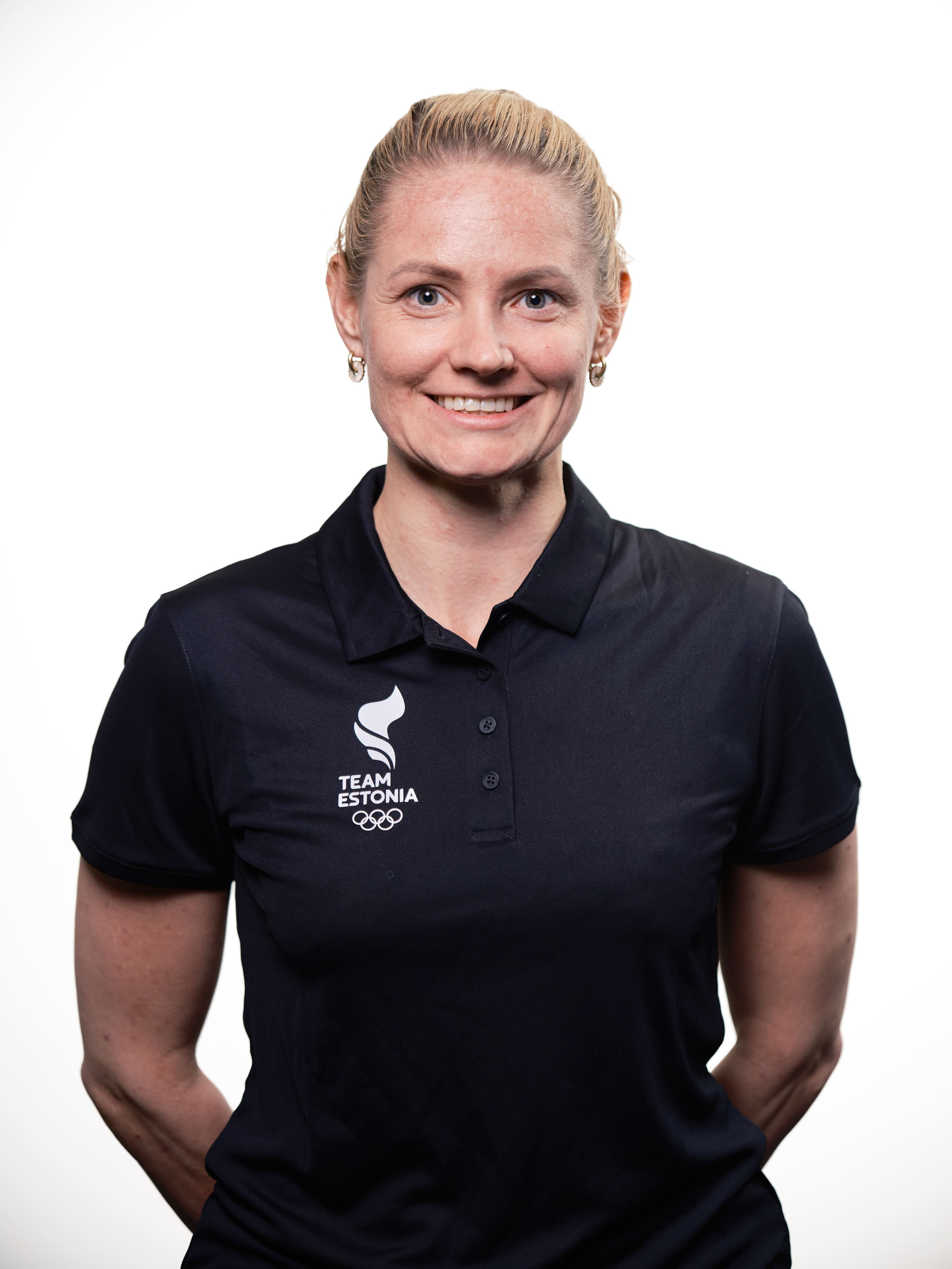
- Born: December 3, 1990 (age 35); Tallinn, Estonia

Team
- Curling club: Tallinn CC, Tallinn, EST
- Skip: Marie Kaldvee
- Fourth: Hettel Weddro
- Third: Kaidi Elmik
- Lead: Liisa Turmann
- Alternate: Elisabeth Tammer

Curling career
- Member Association: Estonia
- World Championship: 2 (2021, 2024)
- European Championship: 8 (2010, 2018, 2019, 2021, 2022, 2023, 2024, 2026)
Medal record
Women's curling
Estonian Women's Curling Championship
Gold medal – first place	2010 Tallinn
Gold medal – first place	2017 Tallinn
Gold medal – first place	2019 Tallinn
Gold medal – first place	2020 Tallinn
Gold medal – first place	2021 Tallinn
Gold medal – first place	2022 Tallinn
Gold medal – first place	2024 Tallinn
Gold medal – first place	2025 Tallinn
Silver medal – second place	2012 Tallinn
Silver medal – second place	2016 Tallinn
Bronze medal – third place	2013 Tallinn
Bronze medal – third place	2014 Tallinn
Bronze medal – third place	2015 Tallinn

Liisa Turmann (born December 3, 1990) is an Estonian curler from Tallinn, Estonia. She currently skips the Estonian women's curling team.

== Career ==
=== Juniors ===
Turmann played in three European Junior Curling Challenge events during her junior career in 2010, 2011 and 2012. Her best finish came in 2012 when her team, skipped by Helen Nummert finished in fourth with a 5–3 record.

=== Women's ===
While still in juniors, Turmann competed in her first European Curling Championships in 2010 as third for Team Estonia skipped by Küllike Ustav. The team finished seventh in the B Division with a 3–6 record.

Turmann did not return to an international competition until the 2018 European Curling Championships as her team, skipped by sister Marie Turmann, won the 2018 Estonian Women's Curling Championship. The team had won the event the previous year as well, but Turmann did not participate in the 2017 European Curling Championships. At the 2018 Euros, the team finished second in the B Division. This qualified Estonia for the 2019 World Qualification Event for a chance to make it to the 2019 World Women's Curling Championship. At the Qualification event, the team could not make the playoffs, finishing with a 3–4 record. In 2019, the team won their first World Curling Tour event at the Tallinn Ladies International Challenger. A few weeks later, the team once again represented Estonia at the 2019 European Curling Championships where they got to compete in the A Division. They finished with a 2–7 record, which qualified them once again for the 2020 World Qualification Event. There, they just missed the playoffs with a 4–3 record. The team won two more national championships in 2020 and 2021.

Due the COVID-19 pandemic, the field at the 2021 World Women's Curling Championship was expanded to fourteen teams, after the 2020 World Women's Curling Championship was cancelled. The 2021 event was originally planned to be hosted by Switzerland, giving that nation an automatic entry. This gave Europe an extra qualification spot for the 2021 Worlds, which was based on the results of the 2019 European Championship, the last Euros held before the pandemic. As they had finished eighth, this qualified Estonia and the Turmann rink for the 2021 Worlds, the first time Estonia would play at the World Championships. At the World Championships, the team finished in last with a 1–12 record. Their lone win came against Germany.

== Personal life ==
Turmann is the general secretary of the Estonian Curling Association. Her sister is teammate Marie Kaldvee.

== Teams ==
Season	Skip	Third	Second	Lead	Alternate
2009–10	Helen Nummert	Liisa Turmann	Gerli Roosme	Marie Turmann	
2010–11	Küllike Ustav	Kristiine Lill	Liisa Turmann	Marie Turmann	Gerli Roosme
2010–11	Helen Nummert	Liisa Turmann	Marie Turmann	Gerli Roosme	Kerli Zirk
2011–12	Helen Nummert	Marie Turmann	Liisa Turmann	Gerli Roosme	Kerli Zirk
2012–13	Marie Turmann	Liisa Turmann	Kädi Kurem	Kerli Laidsalu	Kerli Zirk; Johanna Ehatamm
2013–14	Marie Turmann	Kerli Laidsalu	Kerli Zirk	Johanna Ehatamm	Liisa Turmann
2014–15	Marie Turmann	Kerli Zirk	Kerli Laidsalu	Johanna Ehatamm	Liisa Turmann; Victoria-Laura Lõhmus
2015–16	Marie Turmann	Kerli Laidsalu	Liisa Turmann	Victoria-Laura Lõhmus	Johanna Ehatamm
2016–17	Marie Turmann	Liisa Turmann	Victoria-Laura Lõhmus	Erika Tuvike	
2018–19	Marie Turmann	Kerli Laidsalu	Heili Grossmann	Erika Tuvike	Liisa Turmann
2019–20	Marie Turmann	Kerli Laidsalu	Heili Grossmann	Erika Tuvike	Liisa Turmann
2020–21	Marie Turmann	Liisa Turmann	Heili Grossmann	Erika Tuvike	Kerli Laidsalu
2021–22	Kerli Laidsalu (Fourth)	Liisa Turmann (Skip)	Heili Grossmann	Erika Tuvike	Karoliine Kaare
2022–23	Marie Kaldvee	Liisa Turmann	Kerli Laidsalu	Erika Tuvike	
2023–24	Erika Tuvike (Fourth)	Kerli Laidsalu	Liisa Turmann (Skip)	Heili Grossmann	
2024–25	Erika Tuvike (Fourth)	Kerli Laidsalu	Liisa Turmann (Skip)	Heili Grossmann	
