= 2025 World Mixed Doubles Curling Championship =

2025 edition of the World Mixed Doubles Curling Championship

- Host city: Fredericton, New Brunswick, Canada
- Arena: Willie O'Ree Place
- Dates: April 26 – May 3, 2025
- Winner: Italy
- Female: Stefania Constantini
- Male: Amos Mosaner
- Coach: Marco Mariani
- Finalist: Scotland (Dodds / Mouat)

The 2025 World Mixed Doubles Curling Championship was held from April 26 to May 3, 2025 at Willie O'Ree Place in Fredericton, New Brunswick, Canada. The event was held alongside the 2025 World Senior Curling Championships.

This event was also the last mixed doubles event for countries to earn Qualification Points for the 2026 Winter Olympics.

== Qualification ==
The following nations qualified to participate in the 2025 World Mixed Doubles Curling Championship:

Means of Qualification	Vacancies	Qualified
2024 World Mixed Doubles Curling Championship	16	Sweden; Estonia; Norway; Switzerland; Canada; Scotland; South Korea; Italy; Japan; United States; Germany; China; Netherlands; Denmark; Australia; Czech Republic
2024 World Mixed Doubles Qualification Event	4	Spain; New Zealand; Turkey; Finland
TOTAL	20	

== Teams ==
The teams are listed as follows:

Australia	Canada	China	Czech Republic
Female: Tahli Gill; Male: Dean Hewitt	Female: Jocelyn Peterman; Male: Brett Gallant	Female: Han Yu; Male: Wang Zhiyu	Female: Julie Zelingrová; Male: Vít Chabičovský
Denmark	Estonia	Finland	Germany
Female: Jasmin Holtermann; Male: Henrik Holtermann	Female: Marie Kaldvee; Male: Harri Lill	Female: Lotta Immonen; Male: Markus Sipilä	Female: Pia-Lisa Schöll; Male: Joshua Sutor
Italy	Japan	Netherlands	New Zealand
Female: Stefania Constantini; Male: Amos Mosaner	Female: Chiaki Matsumura; Male: Yasumasa Tanida	Female: Lisenka Bomas; Male: Wouter Gösgens	Female: Jessica Smith; Male: Ben Smith
Norway	Scotland	South Korea	Spain
Female: Kristin Skaslien; Male: Magnus Nedregotten	Female: Jennifer Dodds; Male: Bruce Mouat	Female: Kim Kyeong-ae; Male: Seong Ji-hoon	Female: Oihane Otaegi; Male: Mikel Unanue
Sweden	Switzerland	Turkey	United States
Female: Anna Hasselborg; Male: Oskar Eriksson	Female: Alina Pätz; Male: Sven Michel	Female: Dilşat Yıldız; Male: Bilal Ömer Çakır	Female: Cory Thiesse; Male: Korey Dropkin

=== WCF ranking ===
Year to date World Curling Federation order of merit ranking for each team prior to the event.

Nation (Team)	Rank	Points
Estonia (Kaldvee / Lill)	1	207.8
Norway (Skaslien / Nedregotten)	2	163.5
Australia (Gill / Hewitt)	3	162.3
Canada (Peterman / Gallant)	5	127.5
Scotland (Dodds / Mouat)	8	122.7
Japan (Matsumura / Tanida)	11	115.6
United States (Thiesse / Dropkin)	20	86.6
Switzerland (Pätz / Michel)	21	86.1
South Korea (Kim / Seong)	41	53.1
China (Han / Wang)	44	51.4
Czech Republic (Zelingrová / Chabičovský)	48	49.8
Sweden (Hasselborg / Eriksson)	50	47.3
Denmark (J. Holtermann / H. Holtermann)	55	39.8
Spain (Otaegi / Unanue)	64	32.3
Turkey (Yıldız / Çakır)	74	28.7
Finland (Immonen / Sipilä)	77	27.0
Germany (Schöll / Sutor)	92	19.4
New Zealand (J. Smith / B. Smith)	96	17.8
Italy (Constantini / Mosaner)	NR	0.0
Netherlands (Bomas / Gösgens)	NR	0.0

== Round robin standings ==
Final Round Robin Standings

Key
Teams to Playoffs
Teams to Relegation Playoff
Teams relegated to Qualification Event

Group A	Athletes	W	L	W–L	PF	PA	EW	EL	BE	SE	S%	DSC
Italy	Stefania Constantini / Amos Mosaner	9	0	–	73	35	41	25	0	15	82.9%	17.86
Scotland	Jennifer Dodds / Bruce Mouat	7	2	1–0	67	44	35	30	0	9	83.3%	27.93
Canada	Jocelyn Peterman / Brett Gallant	7	2	0–1	76	45	38	30	0	9	84.1%	26.44
Sweden	Anna Hasselborg / Oskar Eriksson	6	3	–	64	49	38	30	0	9	85.6%	22.22
Finland	Lotta Immonen / Markus Sipilä	5	4	–	55	64	30	36	0	11	74.1%	42.18
South Korea	Kim Kyeong-ae / Seong Ji-hoon	4	5	–	59	64	33	34	0	7	75.8%	36.74
Germany	Pia-Lisa Schöll / Joshua Sutor	2	7	2–0	44	69	28	36	0	7	68.3%	50.94
Denmark	Jasmin Holtermann / Henrik Holtermann	2	7	1–1	37	59	30	38	0	3	72.7%	31.90
China	Han Yu / Wang Zhiyu	2	7	0–2	46	64	32	36	0	8	79.4%	31.46
Netherlands	Lisenka Bomas / Wouter Gösgens	1	8	–	38	66	29	39	0	9	75.6%	34.43

Group B	Athletes	W	L	W–L	PF	PA	EW	EL	BE	SE	S%	DSC
Australia	Tahli Gill / Dean Hewitt	8	1	–	68	40	36	29	0	9	83.4%	19.91
Estonia	Marie Kaldvee / Harri Lill	6	3	1–1	63	53	35	34	0	6	79.0%	20.29
United States	Cory Thiesse / Korey Dropkin	6	3	1–1	74	43	39	25	0	14	87.0%	22.61
Norway	Kristin Skaslien / Magnus Nedregotten	6	3	1–1	67	59	35	34	0	10	79.0%	24.09
New Zealand	Jessica Smith / Ben Smith	5	4	2–0	59	60	32	33	0	8	74.3%	35.32
Switzerland	Alina Pätz / Sven Michel	5	4	1–1	61	48	38	31	0	12	81.8%	22.13
Japan	Chiaki Matsumura / Yasumasa Tanida	5	4	0–2	62	51	39	31	0	15	76.9%	21.41
Czech Republic	Julie Zelingrová / Vít Chabičovský	3	6	–	50	53	34	37	1	12	75.8%	33.74
Turkey	Dilşat Yıldız / Bilal Ömer Çakır	1	8	–	33	77	25	39	0	5	72.4%	63.01
Spain	Oihane Otaegi / Mikel Unanue	0	9	–	27	80	21	41	0	2	65.3%	46.88

Group A Round Robin Summary Table
Pos.	Country	Canada	China	Denmark	Finland	Germany	Italy	Netherlands	Scotland	South Korea	Sweden	Record
3	Canada	—	9–4	6–4	13–2	10–5	5–7	7–3	7–8	11–6	8–6	7–2
9	China	4–9	—	5–6	7–9	6–7	2–8	5–3	5–8	7–4	5–10	2–7
8	Denmark	4–6	6–5	—	3–10	1–7	5–8	7–5	3–7	4–6	4–5	2–7
5	Finland	2–13	9–7	10–3	—	12–6	3–10	6–3	2–9	8–6	3–7	5–4
7	Germany	5–10	7–6	7–1	6–12	—	3–10	5–7	1–7	4–8	6–8	2–7
1	Italy	7–5	8–2	8–5	10–3	10–3	—	8–5	7–4	9–4	6–4	9–0
10	Netherlands	3–7	3–5	5–7	3–6	7–5	5–8	—	3–10	5–9	4–9	1–8
2	Scotland	8–7	8–5	7–3	9–2	7–1	4–7	10–3	—	7–10	7–6	7–2
6	South Korea	6–11	4–7	6–4	6–8	8–4	4–9	9–5	10–7	—	6–9	4–5
4	Sweden	6–8	10–5	5–4	7–3	8–6	4–6	9–4	6–7	9–6	—	6–3

Group B Round Robin Summary Table
Pos.	Country	Australia	Czech Republic	Estonia	Japan	New Zealand	Norway	Spain	Switzerland	Turkey	United States	Record
1	Australia	—	7–2	7–4	4–7	7–5	8–7	8–3	7–3	10–2	10–7	8–1
8	Czech Republic	2–7	—	5–6	6–7	5–7	8–9	6–2	7–6	8–3	3–6	3–6
2	Estonia	4–7	6–5	—	10–8	8–4	9–10	6–5	4–6	9–2	7–6	6–3
7	Japan	7–4	7–6	8–10	—	3–6	5–8	9–1	6–7	9–3	8–6	5–4
5	New Zealand	5–7	7–5	4–8	6–3	—	6–10	13–5	8–7	8–5	2–10	5–4
4	Norway	7–8	9–8	10–9	8–5	10–6	—	10–2	3–8	7–4	3–9	6–3
10	Spain	3–8	2–6	5–6	1–9	5–13	2–10	—	1–10	6–8	2–10	0–9
6	Switzerland	3–7	6–7	6–4	7–6	7–8	8–3	10–1	—	9–3	5–9	5–4
9	Turkey	2–10	3–8	2–9	3–9	5–8	4–7	8–6	3–9	—	3–11	1–8
3	United States	7–10	6–3	6–7	6–8	10–2	9–3	10–2	9–5	11–3	—	6–3

== Round robin results ==
All draw times are listed in Atlantic Time (UTC−03:00).

=== Draw 1 ===
Saturday, April 26, 9:00 am

Sheet A	1	2	3	4	5	6	7	8	Final
Canada (Peterman / Gallant) 🔨	1	0	3	0	2	0	4	X	10
Germany (Schöll / Sutor)	0	2	0	1	0	2	0	X	5

Sheet B	1	2	3	4	5	6	7	8	Final
China (Han / Wang) 🔨	1	1	0	1	0	3	0	1	7
South Korea (Kim / Seong)	0	0	1	0	1	0	2	0	4

Sheet C	1	2	3	4	5	6	7	8	Final
Scotland (Dodds / Mouat)	0	0	3	3	1	0	3	X	10
Netherlands (Bomas / Gösgens) 🔨	1	1	0	0	0	1	0	X	3

Sheet D	1	2	3	4	5	6	7	8	Final
Finland (Immonen / Sipilä)	0	0	1	0	0	2	0	X	3
Italy (Constantini / Mosaner) 🔨	2	2	0	3	1	0	2	X	10

Sheet E	1	2	3	4	5	6	7	8	Final
Denmark (J. Holtermann / H. Holtermann) 🔨	1	0	2	0	0	0	1	0	4
Sweden (Hasselborg / Eriksson)	0	1	0	1	1	1	0	1	5

=== Draw 2 ===
Saturday, April 26, 1:00 pm

Sheet A	1	2	3	4	5	6	7	8	Final
Spain (Otaegi / Unanue)	0	0	0	1	0	0	X	X	1
Japan (Matsumura / Tanida) 🔨	2	2	1	0	3	1	X	X	9

Sheet B	1	2	3	4	5	6	7	8	Final
Australia (Gill / Hewitt)	0	3	0	2	0	1	1	X	7
Switzerland (Pätz / Michel) 🔨	1	0	1	0	1	0	0	X	3

Sheet C	1	2	3	4	5	6	7	8	Final
United States (Thiesse / Dropkin) 🔨	0	2	0	3	5	1	X	X	11
Turkey (Yıldız / Çakır)	1	0	2	0	0	0	X	X	3

Sheet D	1	2	3	4	5	6	7	8	Final
Czech Republic (Zelingrová / Chabičovský) 🔨	2	0	1	0	0	4	0	1	8
Norway (Skaslien / Nedregotten)	0	1	0	3	2	0	3	0	9

Sheet E	1	2	3	4	5	6	7	8	Final
New Zealand (J. Smith / B. Smith)	0	1	1	1	0	1	0	X	4
Estonia (Kaldvee / Lill) 🔨	4	0	0	0	1	0	3	X	8

=== Draw 3 ===
Saturday, April 26, 6:00 pm

Sheet A	1	2	3	4	5	6	7	8	Final
South Korea (Kim / Seong)	2	1	0	2	0	0	1	0	6
Finland (Immonen / Sipilä) 🔨	0	0	1	0	4	1	0	2	8

Sheet B	1	2	3	4	5	6	7	8	Final
Germany (Schöll / Sutor)	0	0	0	1	0	2	X	X	3
Italy (Constantini / Mosaner) 🔨	2	2	1	0	5	0	X	X	10

Sheet C	1	2	3	4	5	6	7	8	Final
Denmark (J. Holtermann / H. Holtermann) 🔨	1	0	1	0	1	0	1	0	4
Canada (Peterman / Gallant)	0	2	0	1	0	2	0	1	6

Sheet D	1	2	3	4	5	6	7	8	Final
Sweden (Hasselborg / Eriksson) 🔨	0	4	1	0	0	2	2	X	9
Netherlands (Bomas / Gösgens)	2	0	0	1	1	0	0	X	4

Sheet E	1	2	3	4	5	6	7	8	Final
China (Han / Wang)	1	0	1	1	0	2	0	X	5
Scotland (Dodds / Mouat) 🔨	0	3	0	0	3	0	2	X	8

=== Draw 4 ===
Sunday, April 27, 10:00 am

Sheet A	1	2	3	4	5	6	7	8	Final
Switzerland (Pätz / Michel) 🔨	1	0	0	2	0	2	0	1	6
Czech Republic (Zelingrová / Chabičovský)	0	4	1	0	1	0	1	0	7

Sheet B	1	2	3	4	5	6	7	8	Final
Japan (Matsumura / Tanida) 🔨	1	0	2	0	1	0	1	0	5
Norway (Skaslien / Nedregotten)	0	1	0	2	0	1	0	4	8

Sheet C	1	2	3	4	5	6	7	8	Final
New Zealand (J. Smith / B. Smith)	3	0	5	0	0	5	X	X	13
Spain (Otaegi / Unanue) 🔨	0	1	0	2	2	0	X	X	5

Sheet D	1	2	3	4	5	6	7	8	Final
Estonia (Kaldvee / Lill) 🔨	2	0	2	2	0	3	X	X	9
Turkey (Yıldız / Çakır)	0	1	0	0	1	0	X	X	2

Sheet E	1	2	3	4	5	6	7	8	Final
Australia (Gill / Hewitt) 🔨	2	0	2	0	2	0	4	0	10
United States (Thiesse / Dropkin)	0	1	0	2	0	3	0	1	7

=== Draw 5 ===
Sunday, April 27, 2:00 pm

Sheet A	1	2	3	4	5	6	7	8	Final
Netherlands (Bomas / Gösgens)	1	0	0	0	1	0	1	X	3
China (Han / Wang) 🔨	0	2	1	1	0	1	0	X	5

Sheet B	1	2	3	4	5	6	7	8	Final
Canada (Peterman / Gallant)	0	2	0	2	0	3	0	1	8
Sweden (Hasselborg / Eriksson) 🔨	3	0	1	0	1	0	1	0	6

Sheet C	1	2	3	4	5	6	7	8	Final
Germany (Schöll / Sutor) 🔨	0	0	4	0	1	0	1	X	6
Finland (Immonen / Sipilä)	3	2	0	2	0	5	0	X	12

Sheet D	1	2	3	4	5	6	7	8	Final
Scotland (Dodds / Mouat) 🔨	1	0	2	0	2	0	2	X	7
Denmark (J. Holtermann / H. Holtermann)	0	1	0	1	0	1	0	X	3

Sheet E	1	2	3	4	5	6	7	8	Final
South Korea (Kim / Seong)	0	1	0	1	0	2	0	X	4
Italy (Constantini / Mosaner) 🔨	4	0	2	0	2	0	1	X	9

=== Draw 6 ===
Sunday, April 27, 6:00 pm

Sheet A	1	2	3	4	5	6	7	8	Final
Turkey (Yıldız / Çakır)	0	1	0	1	0	0	X	X	2
Australia (Gill / Hewitt) 🔨	4	0	2	0	3	1	X	X	10

Sheet B	1	2	3	4	5	6	7	8	Final
Spain (Otaegi / Unanue)	0	2	0	0	2	1	0	0	5
Estonia (Kaldvee / Lill) 🔨	2	0	1	1	0	0	1	1	6

Sheet C	1	2	3	4	5	6	7	8	9	Final
Japan (Matsumura / Tanida) 🔨	0	0	1	1	0	2	0	2	1	7
Czech Republic (Zelingrová / Chabičovský)	2	1	0	0	1	0	2	0	0	6

Sheet D	1	2	3	4	5	6	7	8	Final
United States (Thiesse / Dropkin) 🔨	1	1	0	4	0	4	X	X	10
New Zealand (J. Smith / B. Smith)	0	0	1	0	1	0	X	X	2

Sheet E	1	2	3	4	5	6	7	8	Final
Switzerland (Pätz / Michel)	0	1	0	0	2	2	1	2	8
Norway (Skaslien / Nedregotten) 🔨	1	0	1	1	0	0	0	0	3

=== Draw 7 ===
Monday, April 28, 10:00 am

Sheet A	1	2	3	4	5	6	7	8	Final
Italy (Constantini / Mosaner) 🔨	0	1	0	4	0	1	1	1	8
Denmark (J. Holtermann / H. Holtermann)	2	0	1	0	2	0	0	0	5

Sheet B	1	2	3	4	5	6	7	8	Final
Scotland (Dodds / Mouat) 🔨	1	0	1	3	0	1	3	X	9
Finland (Immonen / Sipilä)	0	1	0	0	1	0	0	X	2

Sheet C	1	2	3	4	5	6	7	8	Final
Sweden (Hasselborg / Eriksson)	2	0	1	0	3	0	3	X	9
South Korea (Kim / Seong) 🔨	0	1	0	3	0	2	0	X	6

Sheet D	1	2	3	4	5	6	7	8	Final
Netherlands (Bomas / Gösgens) 🔨	1	0	0	2	0	0	0	X	3
Canada (Peterman / Gallant)	0	2	1	0	1	1	2	X	7

Sheet E	1	2	3	4	5	6	7	8	Final
Germany (Schöll / Sutor) 🔨	0	0	2	0	1	2	0	2	7
China (Han / Wang)	1	1	0	1	0	0	3	0	6

=== Draw 8 ===
Monday, April 28, 2:00 pm

Sheet A	1	2	3	4	5	6	7	8	Final
Norway (Skaslien / Nedregotten)	0	4	0	2	0	2	1	1	10
New Zealand (J. Smith / B. Smith) 🔨	2	0	2	0	2	0	0	0	6

Sheet B	1	2	3	4	5	6	7	8	Final
United States (Thiesse / Dropkin) 🔨	0	2	1	1	0	1	0	1	6
Czech Republic (Zelingrová / Chabičovský)	1	0	0	0	1	0	1	0	3

Sheet C	1	2	3	4	5	6	7	8	Final
Estonia (Kaldvee / Lill) 🔨	1	0	1	0	0	0	1	1	4
Switzerland (Pätz / Michel)	0	1	0	2	2	1	0	0	6

Sheet D	1	2	3	4	5	6	7	8	9	Final
Turkey (Yıldız / Çakır) 🔨	3	0	1	0	1	0	1	0	2	8
Spain (Otaegi / Unanue)	0	3	0	1	0	1	0	1	0	6

Sheet E	1	2	3	4	5	6	7	8	Final
Japan (Matsumura / Tanida)	0	2	1	0	1	0	2	1	7
Australia (Gill / Hewitt) 🔨	2	0	0	1	0	1	0	0	4

=== Draw 9 ===
Monday, April 28, 6:00 pm

Sheet A	1	2	3	4	5	6	7	8	Final
Scotland (Dodds / Mouat)	0	2	0	0	3	0	2	X	7
South Korea (Kim / Seong) 🔨	4	0	1	1	0	4	0	X	10

Sheet B	1	2	3	4	5	6	7	8	Final
Denmark (J. Holtermann / H. Holtermann) 🔨	0	0	0	1	0	0	X	X	1
Germany (Schöll / Sutor)	1	2	2	0	1	1	X	X	7

Sheet C	1	2	3	4	5	6	7	8	Final
Canada (Peterman / Gallant)	1	0	2	0	2	0	0	0	5
Italy (Constantini / Mosaner) 🔨	0	1	0	1	0	2	1	2	7

Sheet D	1	2	3	4	5	6	7	8	Final
China (Han / Wang)	0	3	0	1	0	1	0	X	5
Sweden (Hasselborg / Eriksson) 🔨	3	0	4	0	2	0	1	X	10

Sheet E	1	2	3	4	5	6	7	8	Final
Finland (Immonen / Sipilä)	2	0	1	0	1	1	1	0	6
Netherlands (Bomas / Gösgens) 🔨	0	1	0	1	0	0	0	1	3

=== Draw 10 ===
Tuesday, April 29, 10:00 am

Sheet A	1	2	3	4	5	6	7	8	Final
United States (Thiesse / Dropkin)	1	0	2	0	1	0	3	2	9
Switzerland (Pätz / Michel) 🔨	0	1	0	2	0	2	0	0	5

Sheet B	1	2	3	4	5	6	7	8	Final
New Zealand (J. Smith / B. Smith) 🔨	0	0	0	1	1	3	1	X	6
Japan (Matsumura / Tanida)	1	1	1	0	0	0	0	X	3

Sheet C	1	2	3	4	5	6	7	8	Final
Spain (Otaegi / Unanue)	0	1	0	1	0	0	0	X	2
Norway (Skaslien / Nedregotten) 🔨	2	0	2	0	1	1	4	X	10

Sheet D	1	2	3	4	5	6	7	8	Final
Australia (Gill / Hewitt) 🔨	2	1	0	2	0	2	0	X	7
Estonia (Kaldvee / Lill)	0	0	1	0	2	0	1	X	4

Sheet E	1	2	3	4	5	6	7	8	Final
Czech Republic (Zelingrová / Chabičovský) 🔨	0	1	0	0	3	1	1	2	8
Turkey (Yıldız / Çakır)	1	0	1	1	0	0	0	0	3

=== Draw 11 ===
Tuesday, April 29, 2:00 pm

Sheet A	1	2	3	4	5	6	7	8	Final
Denmark (J. Holtermann / H. Holtermann) 🔨	2	0	1	0	1	0	2	1	7
Netherlands (Bomas / Gösgens)	0	1	0	1	0	3	0	0	5

Sheet B	1	2	3	4	5	6	7	8	Final
South Korea (Kim / Seong)	0	2	0	2	0	2	0	X	6
Canada (Peterman / Gallant) 🔨	2	0	3	0	2	0	4	X	11

Sheet C	1	2	3	4	5	6	7	8	Final
Finland (Immonen / Sipilä) 🔨	2	0	1	2	0	1	0	3	9
China (Han / Wang)	0	1	0	0	3	0	3	0	7

Sheet D	1	2	3	4	5	6	7	8	Final
Italy (Constantini / Mosaner) 🔨	2	0	1	0	2	0	2	X	7
Scotland (Dodds / Mouat)	0	1	0	2	0	1	0	X	4

Sheet E	1	2	3	4	5	6	7	8	Final
Sweden (Hasselborg / Eriksson)	0	3	0	2	0	2	0	1	8
Germany (Schöll / Sutor) 🔨	1	0	2	0	1	0	2	0	6

=== Draw 12 ===
Tuesday, April 29, 6:00 pm

Sheet A	1	2	3	4	5	6	7	8	Final
New Zealand (J. Smith / B. Smith)	0	0	3	0	1	1	0	3	8
Turkey (Yıldız / Çakır) 🔨	1	1	0	1	0	0	2	0	5

Sheet B	1	2	3	4	5	6	7	8	Final
Switzerland (Pätz / Michel) 🔨	1	1	0	3	3	2	X	X	10
Spain (Otaegi / Unanue)	0	0	1	0	0	0	X	X	1

Sheet C	1	2	3	4	5	6	7	8	Final
Czech Republic (Zelingrová / Chabičovský) 🔨	0	1	0	1	0	0	0	X	2
Australia (Gill / Hewitt)	1	0	2	0	1	1	2	X	7

Sheet D	1	2	3	4	5	6	7	8	Final
Norway (Skaslien / Nedregotten)	0	0	0	0	3	0	X	X	3
United States (Thiesse / Dropkin) 🔨	3	1	2	1	0	2	X	X	9

Sheet E	1	2	3	4	5	6	7	8	Final
Estonia (Kaldvee / Lill) 🔨	4	0	2	1	0	0	3	0	10
Japan (Matsumura / Tanida)	0	3	0	0	2	2	0	1	8

=== Draw 13 ===
Wednesday, April 30, 10:00 am

Sheet A	1	2	3	4	5	6	7	8	Final
China (Han / Wang)	0	0	1	0	1	0	0	X	2
Italy (Constantini / Mosaner) 🔨	1	2	0	3	0	1	1	X	8

Sheet B	1	2	3	4	5	6	7	8	Final
Sweden (Hasselborg / Eriksson) 🔨	1	0	2	1	0	1	0	1	6
Scotland (Dodds / Mouat)	0	2	0	0	3	0	2	0	7

Sheet C	1	2	3	4	5	6	7	8	Final
Netherlands (Bomas / Gösgens) 🔨	1	0	2	1	0	2	0	1	7
Germany (Schöll / Sutor)	0	1	0	0	1	0	3	0	5

Sheet D	1	2	3	4	5	6	7	8	Final
Denmark (J. Holtermann / H. Holtermann) 🔨	1	0	1	0	1	0	1	0	4
South Korea (Kim / Seong)	0	2	0	1	0	2	0	1	6

Sheet E	1	2	3	4	5	6	7	8	Final
Canada (Peterman / Gallant) 🔨	2	2	2	2	0	5	X	X	13
Finland (Immonen / Sipilä)	0	0	0	0	2	0	X	X	2

=== Draw 14 ===
Wednesday, April 30, 2:00 pm

Sheet A	1	2	3	4	5	6	7	8	Final
Australia (Gill / Hewitt) 🔨	1	3	0	0	2	0	0	2	8
Norway (Skaslien / Nedregotten)	0	0	1	1	0	3	2	0	7

Sheet B	1	2	3	4	5	6	7	8	Final
Estonia (Kaldvee / Lill) 🔨	0	1	0	2	0	3	0	1	7
United States (Thiesse / Dropkin)	1	0	1	0	1	0	3	0	6

Sheet C	1	2	3	4	5	6	7	8	Final
Turkey (Yıldız / Çakır)	0	0	2	0	0	1	0	X	3
Japan (Matsumura / Tanida) 🔨	4	1	0	2	1	0	1	X	9

Sheet D	1	2	3	4	5	6	7	8	Final
New Zealand (J. Smith / B. Smith)	0	2	0	2	0	3	0	1	8
Switzerland (Pätz / Michel) 🔨	2	0	1	0	2	0	2	0	7

Sheet E	1	2	3	4	5	6	7	8	Final
Spain (Otaegi / Unanue) 🔨	1	0	0	0	0	0	1	X	2
Czech Republic (Zelingrová / Chabičovský)	0	1	1	1	2	1	0	X	6

=== Draw 15 ===
Wednesday, April 30, 6:00 pm

Sheet A	1	2	3	4	5	6	7	8	Final
Germany (Schöll / Sutor)	0	0	0	0	0	1	X	X	1
Scotland (Dodds / Mouat) 🔨	3	1	1	1	1	0	X	X	7

Sheet B	1	2	3	4	5	6	7	8	Final
Finland (Immonen / Sipilä)	0	2	2	1	0	0	5	X	10
Denmark (J. Holtermann / H. Holtermann) 🔨	1	0	0	0	1	1	0	X	3

Sheet C	1	2	3	4	5	6	7	8	Final
Italy (Constantini / Mosaner)	1	2	0	2	0	1	0	X	6
Sweden (Hasselborg / Eriksson) 🔨	0	0	1	0	2	0	1	X	4

Sheet D	1	2	3	4	5	6	7	8	Final
Canada (Peterman / Gallant) 🔨	1	0	1	0	3	0	1	3	9
China (Han / Wang)	0	1	0	2	0	1	0	0	4

Sheet E	1	2	3	4	5	6	7	8	Final
Netherlands (Bomas / Gösgens)	1	0	0	0	3	1	0	X	5
South Korea (Kim / Seong) 🔨	0	3	3	1	0	0	2	X	9

=== Draw 16 ===
Thursday, May 1, 10:00 am

Sheet A	1	2	3	4	5	6	7	8	Final
Japan (Matsumura / Tanida)	0	0	1	0	2	2	0	3	8
United States (Thiesse / Dropkin) 🔨	2	1	0	2	0	0	1	0	6

Sheet B	1	2	3	4	5	6	7	8	Final
Czech Republic (Zelingrová / Chabičovský)	0	0	1	0	2	0	2	0	5
New Zealand (J. Smith / B. Smith) 🔨	1	1	0	1	0	1	0	3	7

Sheet C	1	2	3	4	5	6	7	8	9	Final
Norway (Skaslien / Nedregotten) 🔨	3	0	1	0	4	0	0	1	1	10
Estonia (Kaldvee / Lill)	0	3	0	2	0	3	1	0	0	9

Sheet D	1	2	3	4	5	6	7	8	Final
Spain (Otaegi / Unanue)	0	1	0	1	0	1	0	X	3
Australia (Gill / Hewitt) 🔨	3	0	1	0	1	0	3	X	8

Sheet E	1	2	3	4	5	6	7	8	Final
Turkey (Yıldız / Çakır) 🔨	2	0	0	0	1	0	0	X	3
Switzerland (Pätz / Michel)	0	3	1	1	0	3	1	X	9

=== Draw 17 ===
Thursday, May 1, 2:00 pm

Sheet A	1	2	3	4	5	6	7	8	Final
Finland (Immonen / Sipilä)	1	0	0	0	1	1	0	0	3
Sweden (Hasselborg / Eriksson) 🔨	0	2	1	1	0	0	2	1	7

Sheet B	1	2	3	4	5	6	7	8	9	Final
Italy (Constantini / Mosaner)	2	1	0	1	1	0	0	0	3	8
Netherlands (Bomas / Gösgens) 🔨	0	0	1	0	0	1	2	1	0	5

Sheet C	1	2	3	4	5	6	7	8	Final
China (Han / Wang)	2	0	1	0	1	0	1	0	5
Denmark (J. Holtermann / H. Holtermann) 🔨	0	1	0	1	0	3	0	1	6

Sheet D	1	2	3	4	5	6	7	8	Final
South Korea (Kim / Seong) 🔨	1	2	0	0	3	0	1	1	8
Germany (Schöll / Sutor)	0	0	1	1	0	2	0	0	4

Sheet E	1	2	3	4	5	6	7	8	9	Final
Scotland (Dodds / Mouat) 🔨	1	0	1	0	0	2	0	3	1	8
Canada (Peterman / Gallant)	0	1	0	2	2	0	2	0	0	7

=== Draw 18 ===
Thursday, May 1, 6:00 pm

Sheet A	1	2	3	4	5	6	7	8	9	Final
Czech Republic (Zelingrová / Chabičovský) 🔨	2	0	1	0	1	1	0	0	0	5
Estonia (Kaldvee / Lill)	0	1	0	1	0	0	3	0	1	6

Sheet B	1	2	3	4	5	6	7	8	Final
Norway (Skaslien / Nedregotten) 🔨	0	1	0	1	2	0	3	X	7
Turkey (Yıldız / Çakır)	1	0	2	0	0	1	0	X	4

Sheet C	1	2	3	4	5	6	7	8	Final
Australia (Gill / Hewitt)	3	0	2	0	1	1	0	X	7
New Zealand (J. Smith / B. Smith) 🔨	0	2	0	1	0	0	2	X	5

Sheet D	1	2	3	4	5	6	7	8	9	Final
Switzerland (Pätz / Michel) 🔨	2	0	2	1	0	0	1	0	1	7
Japan (Matsumura / Tanida)	0	2	0	0	1	2	0	1	0	6

Sheet E	1	2	3	4	5	6	7	8	Final
United States (Thiesse / Dropkin) 🔨	3	2	0	2	0	3	X	X	10
Spain (Otaegi / Unanue)	0	0	1	0	1	0	X	X	2

== Relegation playoff ==
Friday, May 2, 10:00 am

Sheet A	1	2	3	4	5	6	7	8	Final
Denmark (J. Holtermann / H. Holtermann)	2	2	2	1	1	1	X	X	9
Turkey (Yıldız / Çakır) 🔨	0	0	0	0	0	0	X	X	0

Player percentages
Denmark		Turkey	
Jasmin Holtermann	75%	Dilşat Yıldız	48%
Henrik Holtermann	93%	Bilal Ömer Çakır	65%
Total	86%	Total	58%

Sheet E	1	2	3	4	5	6	7	8	Final
Czech Republic (Zelingrová / Chabičovský) 🔨	0	2	0	1	1	0	2	1	7
China (Han / Wang)	1	0	2	0	0	2	0	0	5

Player percentages
Czech Republic		China	
Julie Zelingrová	94%	Han Yu	88%
Vít Chabičovský	75%	Wang Zhiyu	70%
Total	83%	Total	81%

== Playoffs ==
Qualification games
B2	Estonia	7
A3	Canada	5
A2	Scotland	7
B3	United States	5

Semifinals
A1	Italy	7
B2	Estonia	6
B1	Australia	6
A2	Scotland	9

Final
A1	Italy	9
A2	Scotland	4
Bronze medal game
B2	Estonia	2
B1	Australia	9

Ranking Game
A3	Canada	4
B3	United States	8

=== Qualification Games ===
Friday, May 2, 10:00 am

Sheet B	1	2	3	4	5	6	7	8	Final
Scotland (Dodds / Mouat) 🔨	4	0	0	2	0	0	1	0	7
United States (Thiesse / Dropkin)	0	1	1	0	1	1	0	1	5

Player percentages
Scotland		United States	
Jennifer Dodds	83%	Cory Thiesse	83%
Bruce Mouat	91%	Korey Dropkin	86%
Total	88%	Total	85%

Sheet D	1	2	3	4	5	6	7	8	Final
Estonia (Kaldvee / Lill) 🔨	1	0	0	3	0	2	1	0	7
Canada (Peterman / Gallant)	0	1	1	0	2	0	0	1	5

Player percentages
Estonia		Canada	
Marie Kaldvee	73%	Jocelyn Peterman	78%
Harri Lill	81%	Brett Gallant	89%
Total	78%	Total	84%

=== Ranking Game ===
Friday, May 2, 6:00 pm

Sheet C	1	2	3	4	5	6	7	8	Final
Canada (Peterman / Gallant) 🔨	0	1	1	1	0	1	0	X	4
United States (Thiesse / Dropkin)	3	0	0	0	3	0	2	X	8

Player percentages
Canada		United States	
Jocelyn Peterman	73%	Cory Thiesse	85%
Brett Gallant	80%	Korey Dropkin	94%
Total	78%	Total	90%

=== Semifinals ===
Friday, May 2, 6:00 pm

Sheet B	1	2	3	4	5	6	7	8	9	Final
Italy (Constantini / Mosaner) 🔨	1	0	1	0	3	0	1	0	1	7
Estonia (Kaldvee / Lill)	0	2	0	2	0	1	0	1	0	6

Player percentages
Italy		Estonia	
Stefania Constantini	92%	Marie Kaldvee	74%
Amos Mosaner	81%	Harri Lill	87%
Total	85%	Total	82%

Sheet D	1	2	3	4	5	6	7	8	Final
Australia (Gill / Hewitt) 🔨	0	2	1	0	1	0	2	0	6
Scotland (Dodds / Mouat)	1	0	0	5	0	1	0	2	9

Player percentages
Australia		Scotland	
Tahli Gill	81%	Jennifer Dodds	80%
Dean Hewitt	77%	Bruce Mouat	88%
Total	79%	Total	84%

=== Bronze medal game ===
Saturday, May 3, 10:00 am

Sheet C	1	2	3	4	5	6	7	8	Final
Estonia (Kaldvee / Lill)	0	1	0	1	0	0	X	X	2
Australia (Gill / Hewitt) 🔨	3	0	1	0	4	1	X	X	9

Player percentages
Estonia		Australia	
Marie Kaldvee	63%	Tahli Gill	96%
Harri Lill	78%	Dean Hewitt	78%
Total	72%	Total	85%

=== Final ===
Saturday, May 3, 2:00 pm

Sheet C	1	2	3	4	5	6	7	8	Final
Italy (Constantini / Mosaner) 🔨	1	0	1	2	1	0	4	X	9
Scotland (Dodds / Mouat)	0	1	0	0	0	3	0	X	4

Player percentages
Italy		Scotland	
Stefania Constantini	70%	Jennifer Dodds	77%
Amos Mosaner	80%	Bruce Mouat	83%
Total	76%	Total	81%

== Statistics ==
=== Player percentages ===
Final Round Robin Percentages

Female	%
(United States) Cory Thiesse	90.3
(Sweden) Anna Hasselborg	83.3
(Canada) Jocelyn Peterman	82.8
(Australia) Tahli Gill	81.5
(Japan) Chiaki Matsumura	80.3
(Scotland) Jennifer Dodds	80.2
(Italy) Stefania Constantini	78.4
(Switzerland) Alina Pätz	77.7
(China) Han Yu	77.6
(Estonia) Marie Kaldvee	75.4
(Norway) Kristin Skaslien	74.6
(New Zealand) Jessica Smith	73.7
(South Korea) Kim Kyeong-ae	73.2
(Czech Republic) Julie Zelingrová	72.5
(Finland) Lotta Immonen	69.8
(Denmark) Jasmin Holtermann	68.3
(Netherlands) Lisenka Bomas	67.8
(Germany) Pia-Lisa Schöll	65.2
(Turkey) Dilşat Yıldız	65.0
(Spain) Oihane Otaegi	59.9

Male	%
(Sweden) Oskar Eriksson	87.0
(Italy) Amos Mosaner	85.9
(Scotland) Bruce Mouat	85.4
(Canada) Brett Gallant	85.0
(United States) Korey Dropkin	84.9
(Australia) Dean Hewitt	84.6
(Switzerland) Sven Michel	84.4
(Norway) Magnus Nedregotten	81.8
(Estonia) Harri Lill	81.3
(China) Wang Zhiyu	81.3
(Netherlands) Wouter Gösgens	80.6
(Czech Republic) Vít Chabičovský	78.0
(South Korea) Seong Ji-hoon	77.5
(Turkey) Bilal Ömer Çakır	77.1
(Finland) Markus Sipilä	76.9
(Denmark) Henrik Holtermann	75.6
(New Zealand) Ben Smith	74.8
(Japan) Yasumasa Tanida	74.6
(Germany) Joshua Sutor	70.3
(Spain) Mikel Unanue	68.9

== Final standings ==
Key
Teams relegated to World Mixed Doubles Qualification Event

Place	Team
1st place, gold medalist(s)	Italy
2nd place, silver medalist(s)	Scotland
3rd place, bronze medalist(s)	Australia
4	Estonia
5	United States
6	Canada
7	Sweden
8	Norway
9	New Zealand
10	Finland
11	Switzerland
12	South Korea
13	Japan
14	Germany
15	Denmark
16	Czech Republic
17	China
18	Turkey
19	Netherlands
20	Spain
