= Marie Kaldvee =

Estonian curler (born 1995)

- Curler
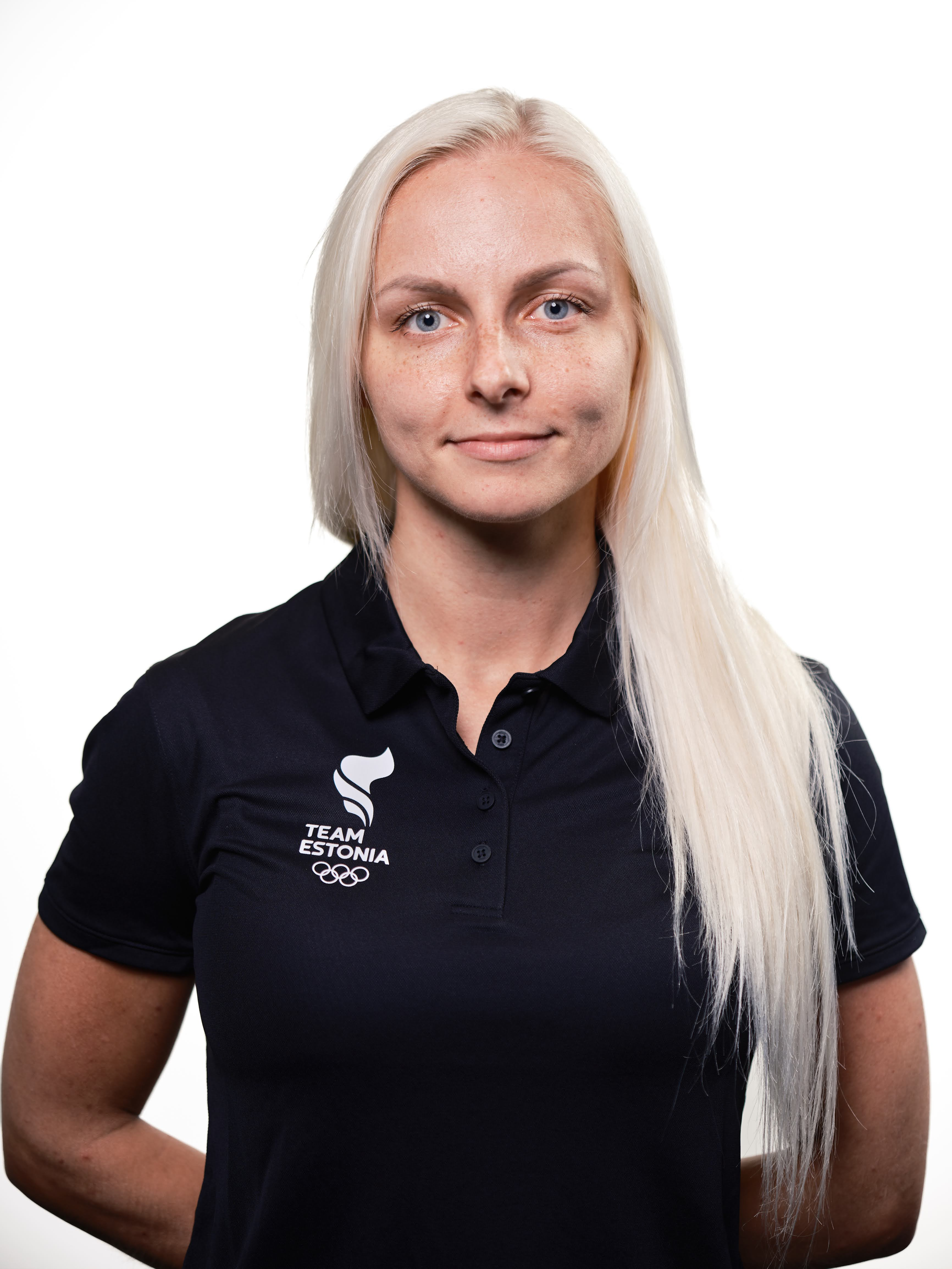
- Kaldvee in 2025
- Born: Marie Turmann; 23 January 1995 (age 31); Tallinn, Estonia

Team
- Curling club: Tallinn CC, Tallinn, Estonia
- Skip: Marie Kaldvee
- Fourth: Hettel Weddro
- Third: Kaidi Elmik
- Lead: Liisa Turmann
- Alternate: Elisabeth Tammer

Curling career
- Member Association: Estonia
- World Championship: 1 (2021)
- World Mixed Doubles Championship: 9 (2016, 2018, 2019, 2021, 2022, 2023, 2024, 2025, 2026)
- European Championship: 8 (2010, 2014, 2017, 2018, 2019, 2022, 2023, 2026)
- Olympic: 1 (2026)
Medal record
Curling
Representing Estonia
World Mixed Doubles Championships
Silver medal – second place	2024 Östersund

Marie Kaldvee (née Turmann; born 23 January 1995) is an Estonian curler from Järveküla, Estonia.

== Career ==
=== Juniors ===
Turmann played for the Estonian team at the 2012 Youth Winter Olympics, playing third on the team, which finished in last place. In the mixed doubles event, she was paired with Italy's Alessandro Zoppi. They would be eliminated after losing their only game.

After playing in five European Junior Curling Challenges, Turmann finally qualified for the World Junior Curling Championships in 2015. Turmann would skip the Estonian team there, with teammates Kerli Zirk, Kerli Laidsalu and Johanna Ehatamm. The team finished the event with a 2–7 record in the round robin, missing the playoffs. In her last year of junior eligibility, Turmann led Estonia to a fourth-place finish at the 2016 World Junior B Curling Championships.

=== Women's ===
At 15 years old, Turmann made her European Curling Championships debut, playing lead for the Estonian team skipped by Küllike Ustav at the 2010 European Curling Championships. The team finished seventeenth overall. Turmann again played for Estonia at the 2014 European Curling Championships, on a team skipped by Maile Mölder. Despite being the team's official alternate, Turmann played in all twelve matches. The team played in the A division of the event and finished in eighth place overall.

In 2017, she won the Estonian women's curling championship. At the 2017 European Curling Championships, she skipped the Estonian team for the first time. The team won third place in the B Division. The team won the Estonian Women's National Championship once again in 2018. At the 2018 European Curling Championships, she led her team to a second-place finish in the B Division. This qualified Estonia for the 2019 World Qualification Event for a chance to make it to the 2019 World Women's Curling Championship. At the Qualification event, the team could not make the playoffs, finishing with a 3–4 record. In 2019, the team won their first World Curling Tour event at the Tallinn Ladies International Challenger. A few weeks later, Turmann once again skipped the Estonian team at the 2019 European Curling Championships where her team got to compete in the A Division. They finished with a 2–7 record, which qualified them once again for the 2020 World Qualification Event. There, they just missed the playoffs with a 4–3 record. The team won two more national championships in 2020 and 2021.

Due to the COVID-19 pandemic, the field at the 2021 World Women's Curling Championship was expanded to 14 teams, after the 2020 World Women's Curling Championship was cancelled. The 2021 event was originally planned to be hosted by Switzerland, giving that nation an automatic entry. This gave Europe an extra qualification spot for the 2021 Worlds, which was based on the results of the 2019 European Championship, the last Euros held before the pandemic. As they had finished 8th, this qualified Estonia and the Turmann rink for the 2021 Worlds, the first time Estonia would play at the World Championships. At the World Championships, Turmann led Estonia to a 1–12 record, in last place. Their lone win came against Germany.

=== Mixed and mixed doubles curling ===
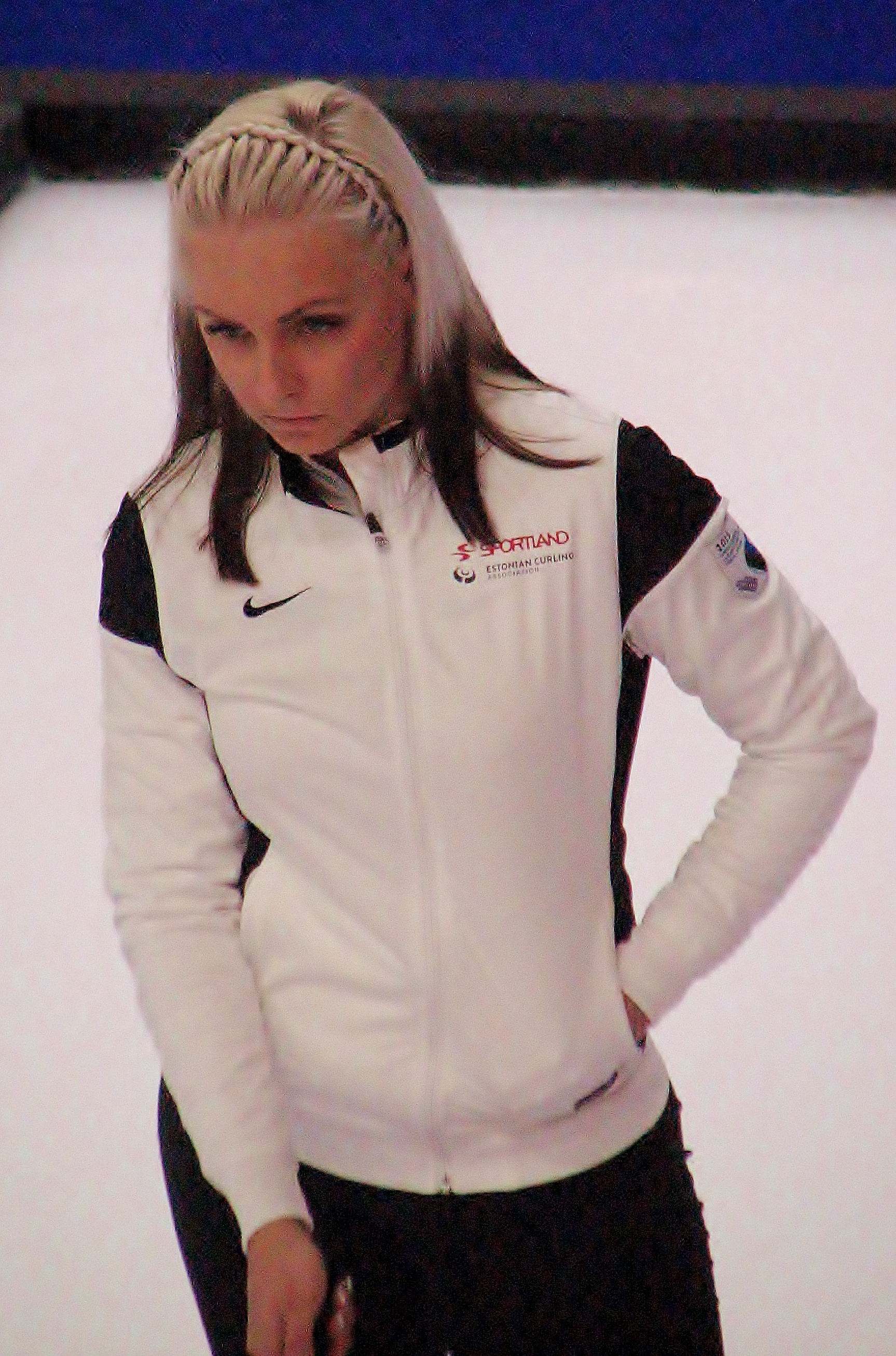
Kaldvee in 2025

Turmann was a member of the Estonian team at the 2014 European Mixed Curling Championship, playing lead. The team finished 12th. Turmann and partner Harri Lill represented Estonia at the 2016 World Mixed Doubles Curling Championship. The team finished in 2nd place in their group with a 5–1 record, then lost to China in the quarterfinals and settled for a 6th-place finish. In 2018, Marie and partner Harri Lill won Estonian nationals and represented Estonia at the 2018 World Mixed Doubles Curling Championship. They went undefeated in group play, but lost in the round of 16 to Turkey. Turmann and Lill returned to represent Estonia at the 2019 World Mixed Doubles Curling Championship. They again won their group with a 6–1 record and reached the quarterfinals, where they lost to the United States.

Kaldvee and Lill would have a successful showing at the 2024 World Mixed Doubles Curling Championship, where they would finish in second place, losing the final to Sweden's Isabella Wranå and Rasmus Wranå 8–4. After this showing, Kaldvee and Lill would each step back from women's and men's play, respectively, for the 2024–25 curling season, to solely focus on mixed doubles curling and qualifying for the Olympics. The following season, Kaldvee and Lill would have incredible success on the tour circuit, winning the Mixed Doubles Super Series: Calgary, Madtown Doubledown, Mixed Doubles Super Series: Fredericton, WCT Łódź Mixed Doubles Masters, and Mixed Doubles Players' Championship, and would also finish runner-up at the Gothenburg Mixed Doubles Cup. These results would have Kaldvee and Lill ranked #1 in the world going into the 2025 World Mixed Doubles Curling Championship. At the 2025 Worlds, Kaldvee and Lill would again have a successful tournament, going 6–3 in the round robin, and would beat Canada's Jocelyn Peterman and Brett Gallant in the quarterfinals before losing to eventual winners and 2022 Olympic Gold Medalists Stefania Constantini and Amos Mosaner from Italy in the semifinal, finishing in 4th place. These successful results over the 2024 and 2025 World Championships, however, qualified Kaldvee and Lill for the 2026 Winter Olympics, marking Estonia's debut in curling at the Olympic Games.

== Personal life ==
Kaldvee is employed as an engineer. Her sister is teammate Liisa Turmann. In June 2021, she married fellow curler Tarvin Kaldvee, Mari and Tarvin as teammates won silver medals on 2017 Estonian mixed curling championship.
