= 2024 World Mixed Doubles Qualification Event =

- Host city: Dumfries, Scotland
- Arena: Dumfries Ice Bowl
- Dates: December 1–7
- Qualifiers: New Zealand; Spain; Turkey; Finland

The 2024 World Mixed Doubles Qualification Event was held from December 1 to 7, 2024 at the Dumfries Ice Bowl in Dumfries, Scotland. The top four placing teams (Spain, New Zealand, Turkey, and Finland) qualified for the 2025 World Mixed Doubles Curling Championship in Fredericton, New Brunswick, Canada. By qualifying for the World Championship, the four teams advancing from this event also secured, at a minimum, a spot in the 2025 Olympic Qualification Event.

== Teams ==
The teams are as follows:

| Austria | Belgium | Brazil | Chinese Taipei |
|---|---|---|---|
| Female: Emma Müller; Male: Martin Seiwald | Female: Annemiek Huiskamp; Male: Pim Van Vlaenderen | Female: Fabiana Campos; Male: Felipe Pires | Female: Amanda Chou; Male: Brendon Liu |
| England | Finland | Greece | Guyana |
| Female: Lina Opel; Male: Michael Opel | Female: Tiina Suuripää; Male: Markus Sipilä | Female: Alexandra Radounikli; Male: Alexandros Arampatzis | Female: Farzana Hussain; Male: Rayad Husain |
| Hong Kong | Hungary | India | Ireland |
| Female: Ling-Yue Hung; Male: Jason Chang | Female: Linda Joó; Male: Raul Kárász | Female: Namini Chaudhari; Male: P. N. Raju | Female: Ailsa Barron; Male: John Wilson |
| Jamaica | Kyrgyzstan | Latvia | Lithuania |
| Female: Margot Shepherd-Spurgeon; Male: Andrew Walker | Female: Keremet Asanbaeva; Male: Iskhak Abykeev | Female: Katrīna Gaidule; Male: Roberts Reinis Buncis | Female: Akvile Rykove; Male: Konstantin Rykov |
| Mexico | New Zealand | Philippines | Poland |
| Female: Danielle Serra; Male: Diego Tompkins | Female: Jessica Smith; Male: Ben Smith | Female: Kathleen Dubberstein; Male: Pedro Malvar | Female: Adela Walczak; Male: Andrzej Augustyniak |
| Portugal | Puerto Rico | Romania | Saudi Arabia |
| Female: Antonieta Martins Ethier; Male: Vítor Santos | Female: Rachel Conley; Male: José Sepúlveda | Female: Valentina Crina Boboc; Male: Allen Coliban | Female: Karrie Al-Aqel; Male: Suleiman Al-Aqel |
| Slovakia | Slovenia | Spain | Turkey |
| Female: Silvia Sýkorová; Male: Marek Sýkora | Female: Liza Gregori; Male: Simon Langus | Female: Oihane Otaegi; Male: Mikel Unanue | Female: Dilşat Yıldız; Male: Bilal Ömer Çakır |
| Ukraine | | | |
| Female: Oleksandra Kononenko; Male: Yaroslav Shchur | | | |

== Round robin standings ==
Final Round Robin Standings

Key
| Teams to Playoffs |

| Group A | W | L | W–L | DSC |
|---|---|---|---|---|
| Latvia | 6 | 0 | – | 26.80 |
| Slovakia | 5 | 1 | – | 71.71 |
| Hungary | 4 | 2 | – | 35.30 |
| Hong Kong | 3 | 3 | – | 57.02 |
| Jamaica | 1 | 5 | 1–1 | 75.94 |
| Belgium | 1 | 5 | 1–1 | 116.53 |
| Romania | 1 | 5 | 1–1 | 158.43 |

| Group B | W | L | W–L | DSC |
|---|---|---|---|---|
| Turkey | 6 | 0 | – | 30.25 |
| Portugal | 4 | 2 | 1–0 | 75.74 |
| Ireland | 4 | 2 | 0–1 | 102.29 |
| Mexico | 3 | 3 | 1–0 | 46.91 |
| Austria | 3 | 3 | 0–1 | 77.56 |
| Saudi Arabia | 1 | 5 | – | 150.60 |
| Kyrgyzstan | 0 | 6 | – | 87.13 |

| Group C | W | L | W–L | DSC |
|---|---|---|---|---|
| Spain | 6 | 0 | – | 43.94 |
| Guyana | 5 | 1 | – | 38.97 |
| Slovenia | 4 | 2 | – | 37.30 |
| England | 2 | 4 | 1–1 | 47.05 |
| Chinese Taipei | 2 | 4 | 1–1 | 76.27 |
| Greece | 2 | 4 | 1–1 | 104.55 |
| Brazil | 0 | 6 | – | 134.72 |

| Group D | W | L | W–L | DSC |
|---|---|---|---|---|
| Finland | 6 | 1 | 1–1 | 34.12 |
| New Zealand | 6 | 1 | 1–1 | 38.86 |
| Poland | 6 | 1 | 1–1 | 48.72 |
| Ukraine | 4 | 3 | – | 70.32 |
| Philippines | 3 | 4 | – | 115.05 |
| India | 2 | 5 | – | 72.97 |
| Lithuania | 1 | 6 | – | 51.71 |
| Puerto Rico | 0 | 7 | – | 148.74 |

Group A Round Robin Summary Table
| Pos. | Country | Belgium | Hong Kong | Hungary | Jamaica | Latvia | Romania | Slovakia | Record |
|---|---|---|---|---|---|---|---|---|---|
| 6 | Belgium | — | 0–10 | 8–9 | 7–8 | 2–10 | 9–7 | 2–7 | 1–5 |
| 4 | Hong Kong | 10–0 | — | 4–7 | 8–4 | 2–8 | 7–4 | 6–9 | 3–3 |
| 3 | Hungary | 9–8 | 7–4 | — | 8–7 | 4–10 | 13–3 | 7–8 | 4–2 |
| 5 | Jamaica | 8–7 | 4–8 | 7–8 | — | 1–13 | 4–5 | L–W | 1–5 |
| 1 | Latvia | 10–2 | 8–2 | 10–4 | 13–1 | — | 14–3 | 11–0 | 6–0 |
| 7 | Romania | 7–9 | 4–7 | 3–13 | 5–4 | 3–14 | — | 2–9 | 1–5 |
| 2 | Slovakia | 7–2 | 9–6 | 8–7 | W–L | 0–11 | 9–2 | — | 5–1 |

Group B Round Robin Summary Table
| Pos. | Country | Austria | | Kyrgyzstan | Mexico | Portugal | Saudi Arabia | Türkiye | Record |
|---|---|---|---|---|---|---|---|---|---|
| 5 | Austria | — | 5–6 | 10–5 | 2–8 | 11–9 | 10–0 | 0–8 | 3–3 |
| 3 | Ireland | 6–5 | — | 6–5 | 11–3 | 5–9 | 13–6 | 2–8 | 4–2 |
| 7 | Kyrgyzstan | 5–10 | 5–6 | — | 0–12 | 5–10 | 8–11 | 1–14 | 0–6 |
| 4 | Mexico | 8–2 | 3–11 | 12–0 | — | 6–7 | 11–2 | 1–9 | 3–3 |
| 2 | Portugal | 9–11 | 9–5 | 10–5 | 7–6 | — | 14–1 | 3–7 | 4–2 |
| 6 | Saudi Arabia | 0–10 | 6–13 | 11–8 | 2–11 | 1–14 | — | 1–12 | 1–5 |
| 1 | Turkey | 8–0 | 8–2 | 14–1 | 9–1 | 7–3 | 12–1 | — | 6–0 |

Group C Round Robin Summary Table
| Pos. | Country | Brazil | Chinese Taipei | England | Greece | Guyana | Slovenia | Spain | Record |
|---|---|---|---|---|---|---|---|---|---|
| 7 | Brazil | — | 4–8 | 0–10 | 1–7 | 1–10 | 2–7 | 1–13 | 0–6 |
| 5 | Chinese Taipei | 8–4 | — | 3–7 | 9–2 | 5–8 | 6–8 | 4–8 | 2–4 |
| 4 | England | 10–0 | 7–3 | — | 3–8 | 1–14 | 6–12 | 7–8 | 2–4 |
| 6 | Greece | 7–1 | 2–9 | 8–3 | — | 3–10 | 0–12 | 8–9 | 2–4 |
| 2 | Guyana | 10–1 | 8–5 | 14–1 | 10–3 | — | 7–4 | 6–7 | 5–1 |
| 3 | Slovenia | 7–2 | 8–6 | 12–6 | 12–0 | 4–7 | — | 5–8 | 4–2 |
| 1 | Spain | 13–1 | 8–4 | 8–7 | 9–8 | 7–6 | 8–5 | — | 6–0 |

Group D Round Robin Summary Table
| Pos. | Country | Finland | India | Lithuania | New Zealand | Philippines | Poland | Puerto Rico | Ukraine | Record |
|---|---|---|---|---|---|---|---|---|---|---|
| 1 | Finland | — | 12–1 | 7–3 | 5–7 | 7–3 | 9–5 | 17–1 | 8–3 | 6–1 |
| 6 | India | 1–12 | — | 9–8 | 1–11 | 3–10 | 1–11 | 9–1 | 5–6 | 2–5 |
| 7 | Lithuania | 3–7 | 8–9 | — | 4–13 | 4–8 | 3–12 | 8–2 | 4–6 | 1–6 |
| 2 | New Zealand | 7–5 | 11–1 | 13–4 | — | 7–4 | 6–9 | 13–1 | 9–3 | 6–1 |
| 5 | Philippines | 3–7 | 10–3 | 8–4 | 4–7 | — | 5–11 | 9–1 | 7–9 | 3–4 |
| 3 | Poland | 5–9 | 11–1 | 12–3 | 9–6 | 11–5 | — | 14–4 | 10–2 | 6–1 |
| 8 | Puerto Rico | 1–17 | 1–9 | 2–8 | 1–13 | 1–9 | 4–14 | — | 1–15 | 0–7 |
| 4 | Ukraine | 3–8 | 6–5 | 6–4 | 3–9 | 9–7 | 2–10 | 15–1 | — | 4–3 |

== Round robin results ==
All draw times are listed in Greenwich Mean Time (UTC+00:00).

=== Draw 1 ===
Sunday, December 1, 19:30

| Sheet B | 1 | 2 | 3 | 4 | 5 | 6 | 7 | 8 | Final |
| England | 1 | 0 | 3 | 0 | 2 | 0 | 0 | 0 | 6 |
| Slovenia 🔨 | 0 | 3 | 0 | 2 | 0 | 3 | 1 | 3 | 12 |

| Sheet D | 1 | 2 | 3 | 4 | 5 | 6 | 7 | 8 | Final |
| Poland 🔨 | 2 | 1 | 1 | 2 | 0 | 5 | X | X | 11 |
| India | 0 | 0 | 0 | 0 | 1 | 0 | X | X | 1 |

| Sheet F | 1 | 2 | 3 | 4 | 5 | 6 | 7 | 8 | Final |
| Brazil 🔨 | 0 | 1 | 0 | 0 | 0 | 0 | 0 | X | 1 |
| Greece | 1 | 0 | 1 | 1 | 2 | 1 | 1 | X | 7 |

| Sheet C | 1 | 2 | 3 | 4 | 5 | 6 | 7 | 8 | Final |
| Puerto Rico | 0 | 1 | 1 | 0 | 0 | 0 | X | X | 2 |
| Lithuania 🔨 | 3 | 0 | 0 | 2 | 2 | 1 | X | X | 8 |

| Sheet E | 1 | 2 | 3 | 4 | 5 | 6 | 7 | 8 | Final |
| Philippines | 0 | 1 | 0 | 0 | 4 | 0 | 0 | 2 | 7 |
| Ukraine 🔨 | 1 | 0 | 2 | 1 | 0 | 4 | 1 | 0 | 9 |

=== Draw 2 ===
Monday, December 2, 9:00

| Sheet A | 1 | 2 | 3 | 4 | 5 | 6 | 7 | 8 | Final |
| Philippines 🔨 | 0 | 0 | 3 | 0 | 1 | 1 | 0 | 0 | 5 |
| Poland | 1 | 1 | 0 | 2 | 0 | 0 | 3 | 4 | 11 |

| Sheet C | 1 | 2 | 3 | 4 | 5 | 6 | 7 | 8 | Final |
| Greece | 0 | 4 | 3 | 0 | 0 | 1 | 0 | 0 | 8 |
| Spain 🔨 | 4 | 0 | 0 | 1 | 2 | 0 | 1 | 1 | 9 |

| Sheet E | 1 | 2 | 3 | 4 | 5 | 6 | 7 | 8 | Final |
| Guyana 🔨 | 3 | 0 | 0 | 2 | 2 | 0 | 1 | X | 8 |
| Chinese Taipei | 0 | 2 | 1 | 0 | 0 | 2 | 0 | X | 5 |

| Sheet B | 1 | 2 | 3 | 4 | 5 | 6 | 7 | 8 | Final |
| India | 0 | 0 | 1 | 0 | 0 | 0 | X | X | 1 |
| Finland 🔨 | 4 | 1 | 0 | 3 | 3 | 1 | X | X | 12 |

| Sheet D | 1 | 2 | 3 | 4 | 5 | 6 | 7 | 8 | Final |
| Puerto Rico | 1 | 0 | 0 | 0 | 0 | 0 | X | X | 1 |
| New Zealand 🔨 | 0 | 4 | 3 | 1 | 1 | 4 | X | X | 13 |

=== Draw 3 ===
Monday, December 2, 12:30

| Sheet A | 1 | 2 | 3 | 4 | 5 | 6 | 7 | 8 | Final |
| Mexico | 0 | 0 | 0 | 3 | 2 | 0 | 1 | 0 | 6 |
| Portugal 🔨 | 1 | 1 | 2 | 0 | 0 | 1 | 0 | 2 | 7 |

| Sheet C | 1 | 2 | 3 | 4 | 5 | 6 | 7 | 8 | Final |
| Jamaica 🔨 | 0 | 0 | 0 | 0 | 2 | 2 | 0 | 0 | 4 |
| Hong Kong | 2 | 1 | 1 | 1 | 0 | 0 | 2 | 1 | 8 |

| Sheet E | 1 | 2 | 3 | 4 | 5 | 6 | 7 | 8 | Final |
| Austria | 1 | 0 | 2 | 1 | 3 | 1 | 0 | 2 | 10 |
| Kyrgyzstan 🔨 | 0 | 1 | 0 | 0 | 0 | 0 | 4 | 0 | 5 |

| Sheet B | 1 | 2 | 3 | 4 | 5 | 6 | 7 | 8 | Final |
| Saudi Arabia | 1 | 0 | 1 | 0 | 4 | 0 | 0 | X | 6 |
| Ireland 🔨 | 0 | 4 | 0 | 3 | 0 | 5 | 1 | X | 13 |

| Sheet D | 1 | 2 | 3 | 4 | 5 | 6 | 7 | 8 | Final |
| Hungary 🔨 | 2 | 0 | 5 | 0 | 2 | 1 | 3 | X | 13 |
| Romania | 0 | 1 | 0 | 2 | 0 | 0 | 0 | X | 3 |

| Sheet F | 1 | 2 | 3 | 4 | 5 | 6 | 7 | 8 | Final |
| Slovakia | 0 | 0 | 0 | 0 | 0 | 0 | X | X | 0 |
| Latvia 🔨 | 1 | 4 | 2 | 1 | 2 | 1 | X | X | 11 |

=== Draw 4 ===
Monday, December 2, 16:00

| Sheet A | 1 | 2 | 3 | 4 | 5 | 6 | 7 | 8 | Final |
| Finland 🔨 | 3 | 1 | 0 | 3 | 1 | 0 | X | X | 8 |
| Ukraine | 0 | 0 | 1 | 0 | 0 | 2 | X | X | 3 |

| Sheet C | 1 | 2 | 3 | 4 | 5 | 6 | 7 | 8 | 9 | Final |
| Lithuania 🔨 | 0 | 4 | 0 | 2 | 0 | 1 | 0 | 1 | 0 | 8 |
| India | 2 | 0 | 1 | 0 | 1 | 0 | 4 | 0 | 1 | 9 |

| Sheet E | 1 | 2 | 3 | 4 | 5 | 6 | 7 | 8 | Final |
| England 🔨 | 0 | 0 | 2 | 1 | 0 | 3 | 1 | 0 | 7 |
| Spain | 2 | 2 | 0 | 0 | 1 | 0 | 0 | 3 | 8 |

| Sheet B | 1 | 2 | 3 | 4 | 5 | 6 | 7 | 8 | Final |
| Philippines | 1 | 0 | 0 | 1 | 0 | 2 | 0 | 0 | 4 |
| New Zealand 🔨 | 0 | 1 | 1 | 0 | 1 | 0 | 1 | 3 | 7 |

| Sheet D | 1 | 2 | 3 | 4 | 5 | 6 | 7 | 8 | Final |
| Brazil | 0 | 0 | 1 | 0 | 0 | 0 | X | X | 1 |
| Guyana 🔨 | 1 | 4 | 0 | 2 | 2 | 1 | X | X | 10 |

| Sheet F | 1 | 2 | 3 | 4 | 5 | 6 | 7 | 8 | Final |
| Chinese Taipei | 0 | 3 | 0 | 2 | 0 | 0 | 0 | 1 | 6 |
| Slovenia 🔨 | 2 | 0 | 1 | 0 | 2 | 1 | 2 | 0 | 8 |

=== Draw 5 ===
Monday, December 2, 19:30

| Sheet A | 1 | 2 | 3 | 4 | 5 | 6 | 7 | 8 | Final |
| Belgium | 0 | 0 | 0 | 1 | 3 | 0 | 5 | X | 9 |
| Romania 🔨 | 1 | 1 | 3 | 0 | 0 | 2 | 0 | X | 7 |

| Sheet C | 1 | 2 | 3 | 4 | 5 | 6 | 7 | 8 | Final |
| Turkey 🔨 | 2 | 1 | 2 | 2 | 1 | 0 | 1 | X | 9 |
| Mexico | 0 | 0 | 0 | 0 | 0 | 1 | 0 | X | 1 |

| Sheet E | 1 | 2 | 3 | 4 | 5 | 6 | 7 | 8 | 9 | Final |
| Hong Kong | 0 | 2 | 1 | 0 | 0 | 2 | 0 | 1 | 0 | 6 |
| Slovakia 🔨 | 3 | 0 | 0 | 1 | 1 | 0 | 1 | 0 | 3 | 9 |

| Sheet B | 1 | 2 | 3 | 4 | 5 | 6 | 7 | 8 | Final |
| Latvia 🔨 | 2 | 4 | 3 | 0 | 2 | 2 | X | X | 13 |
| Jamaica | 0 | 0 | 0 | 1 | 0 | 0 | X | X | 1 |

| Sheet D | 1 | 2 | 3 | 4 | 5 | 6 | 7 | 8 | Final |
| Kyrgyzstan | 1 | 0 | 0 | 0 | 1 | 0 | 3 | 0 | 5 |
| Portugal 🔨 | 0 | 4 | 1 | 1 | 0 | 1 | 0 | 3 | 10 |

| Sheet F | 1 | 2 | 3 | 4 | 5 | 6 | 7 | 8 | Final |
| Saudi Arabia | 0 | 0 | 0 | 0 | 0 | 0 | X | X | 0 |
| Austria 🔨 | 3 | 3 | 1 | 1 | 1 | 1 | X | X | 10 |

=== Draw 6 ===
Tuesday, December 3, 9:00

| Sheet A | 1 | 2 | 3 | 4 | 5 | 6 | 7 | 8 | Final |
| New Zealand 🔨 | 3 | 2 | 0 | 3 | 0 | 5 | X | X | 13 |
| Lithuania | 0 | 0 | 1 | 0 | 3 | 0 | X | X | 4 |

| Sheet C | 1 | 2 | 3 | 4 | 5 | 6 | 7 | 8 | Final |
| Finland | 0 | 1 | 0 | 4 | 2 | 0 | 2 | X | 9 |
| Poland 🔨 | 3 | 0 | 1 | 0 | 0 | 1 | 0 | X | 5 |

| Sheet E | 1 | 2 | 3 | 4 | 5 | 6 | 7 | 8 | Final |
| Slovenia | 1 | 4 | 2 | 1 | 2 | 2 | X | X | 12 |
| Greece 🔨 | 0 | 0 | 0 | 0 | 0 | 0 | X | X | 0 |

| Sheet B | 1 | 2 | 3 | 4 | 5 | 6 | 7 | 8 | Final |
| Ukraine 🔨 | 4 | 3 | 2 | 1 | 0 | 5 | X | X | 15 |
| Puerto Rico | 0 | 0 | 0 | 0 | 1 | 0 | X | X | 1 |

| Sheet D | 1 | 2 | 3 | 4 | 5 | 6 | 7 | 8 | Final |
| Guyana 🔨 | 0 | 3 | 2 | 3 | 3 | 2 | 1 | X | 14 |
| England | 1 | 0 | 0 | 0 | 0 | 0 | 0 | X | 1 |

| Sheet F | 1 | 2 | 3 | 4 | 5 | 6 | 7 | 8 | Final |
| Spain 🔨 | 3 | 1 | 2 | 0 | 5 | 2 | X | X | 13 |
| Brazil | 0 | 0 | 0 | 1 | 0 | 0 | X | X | 1 |

=== Draw 7 ===
Tuesday, December 3, 12:30

| Sheet A | 1 | 2 | 3 | 4 | 5 | 6 | 7 | 8 | Final |
| Jamaica | 0 | 2 | 1 | 0 | 0 | 4 | 0 | 0 | 7 |
| Hungary 🔨 | 2 | 0 | 0 | 2 | 1 | 0 | 2 | 1 | 8 |

| Sheet C | 1 | 2 | 3 | 4 | 5 | 6 | 7 | 8 | Final |
| Portugal 🔨 | 5 | 4 | 1 | 1 | 0 | 3 | X | X | 14 |
| Saudi Arabia | 0 | 0 | 0 | 0 | 1 | 0 | X | X | 1 |

| Sheet E | 1 | 2 | 3 | 4 | 5 | 6 | 7 | 8 | Final |
| Romania | 0 | 1 | 0 | 1 | 0 | 1 | 0 | X | 3 |
| Latvia 🔨 | 3 | 0 | 3 | 0 | 5 | 0 | 3 | X | 14 |

| Sheet B | 1 | 2 | 3 | 4 | 5 | 6 | 7 | 8 | Final |
| Slovakia 🔨 | 1 | 1 | 0 | 1 | 1 | 0 | 3 | X | 7 |
| Belgium | 0 | 0 | 1 | 0 | 0 | 1 | 0 | X | 2 |

| Sheet D | 1 | 2 | 3 | 4 | 5 | 6 | 7 | 8 | Final |
| Ireland | 0 | 1 | 4 | 0 | 3 | 3 | X | X | 11 |
| Mexico 🔨 | 1 | 0 | 0 | 2 | 0 | 0 | X | X | 3 |

| Sheet F | 1 | 2 | 3 | 4 | 5 | 6 | 7 | 8 | Final |
| Kyrgyzstan | 0 | 1 | 0 | 0 | 0 | 0 | 0 | X | 1 |
| Turkey 🔨 | 3 | 0 | 4 | 3 | 2 | 1 | 1 | X | 14 |

=== Draw 8 ===
Tuesday, December 3, 16:00

| Sheet A | 1 | 2 | 3 | 4 | 5 | 6 | 7 | 8 | Final |
| England 🔨 | 1 | 1 | 1 | 2 | 3 | 2 | X | X | 10 |
| Brazil | 0 | 0 | 0 | 0 | 0 | 0 | X | X | 0 |

| Sheet C | 1 | 2 | 3 | 4 | 5 | 6 | 7 | 8 | Final |
| Guyana | 1 | 0 | 1 | 2 | 0 | 2 | 0 | 1 | 7 |
| Slovenia 🔨 | 0 | 1 | 0 | 0 | 2 | 0 | 1 | 0 | 4 |

| Sheet E | 1 | 2 | 3 | 4 | 5 | 6 | 7 | 8 | Final |
| New Zealand 🔨 | 2 | 0 | 1 | 0 | 3 | 0 | 1 | 0 | 7 |
| Finland | 0 | 1 | 0 | 2 | 0 | 1 | 0 | 1 | 5 |

| Sheet B | 1 | 2 | 3 | 4 | 5 | 6 | 7 | 8 | Final |
| Spain 🔨 | 1 | 2 | 0 | 2 | 1 | 0 | 1 | 1 | 8 |
| Chinese Taipei | 0 | 0 | 3 | 0 | 0 | 1 | 0 | 0 | 4 |

| Sheet D | 1 | 2 | 3 | 4 | 5 | 6 | 7 | 8 | Final |
| India | 0 | 0 | 2 | 0 | 0 | 1 | 1 | 1 | 5 |
| Ukraine 🔨 | 1 | 1 | 0 | 1 | 3 | 0 | 0 | 0 | 6 |

| Sheet F | 1 | 2 | 3 | 4 | 5 | 6 | 7 | 8 | Final |
| Philippines | 3 | 0 | 1 | 0 | 2 | 0 | 2 | X | 8 |
| Lithuania 🔨 | 0 | 1 | 0 | 2 | 0 | 1 | 0 | X | 4 |

=== Draw 9 ===
Tuesday, December 3, 19:30

| Sheet A | 1 | 2 | 3 | 4 | 5 | 6 | 7 | 8 | Final |
| Latvia 🔨 | 2 | 0 | 2 | 1 | 0 | 2 | 1 | X | 8 |
| Hong Kong | 0 | 1 | 0 | 0 | 1 | 0 | 0 | X | 2 |

| Sheet C | 1 | 2 | 3 | 4 | 5 | 6 | 7 | 8 | Final |
| Slovakia | 1 | 1 | 2 | 0 | 2 | 1 | 2 | X | 9 |
| Romania 🔨 | 0 | 0 | 0 | 2 | 0 | 0 | 0 | X | 2 |

| Sheet E | 1 | 2 | 3 | 4 | 5 | 6 | 7 | 8 | Final |
| Belgium | 0 | 1 | 1 | 1 | 1 | 0 | 4 | 0 | 8 |
| Hungary 🔨 | 1 | 0 | 0 | 0 | 0 | 4 | 0 | 4 | 9 |

| Sheet B | 1 | 2 | 3 | 4 | 5 | 6 | 7 | 8 | Final |
| Mexico 🔨 | 2 | 2 | 1 | 1 | 2 | 3 | 1 | X | 12 |
| Kyrgyzstan | 0 | 0 | 0 | 0 | 0 | 0 | 0 | X | 0 |

| Sheet D | 1 | 2 | 3 | 4 | 5 | 6 | 7 | 8 | Final |
| Austria 🔨 | 0 | 0 | 0 | 0 | 0 | 0 | X | X | 0 |
| Turkey | 1 | 1 | 1 | 2 | 2 | 1 | X | X | 8 |

| Sheet F | 1 | 2 | 3 | 4 | 5 | 6 | 7 | 8 | Final |
| Portugal | 2 | 1 | 1 | 2 | 0 | 1 | 0 | 2 | 9 |
| Ireland 🔨 | 0 | 0 | 0 | 0 | 2 | 0 | 3 | 0 | 5 |

=== Draw 10 ===
Wednesday, December 4, 9:00

| Sheet A | 1 | 2 | 3 | 4 | 5 | 6 | 7 | 8 | Final |
| Chinese Taipei 🔨 | 1 | 3 | 2 | 1 | 1 | 0 | 1 | X | 9 |
| Greece | 0 | 0 | 0 | 0 | 0 | 2 | 0 | X | 2 |

| Sheet C | 1 | 2 | 3 | 4 | 5 | 6 | 7 | 8 | Final |
| India 🔨 | 0 | 0 | 0 | 0 | 2 | 1 | 0 | X | 3 |
| Philippines | 4 | 2 | 2 | 1 | 0 | 0 | 1 | X | 10 |

| Sheet E | 1 | 2 | 3 | 4 | 5 | 6 | 7 | 8 | Final |
| Ukraine 🔨 | 0 | 1 | 2 | 1 | 1 | 1 | 0 | X | 6 |
| Lithuania | 1 | 0 | 0 | 0 | 0 | 0 | 3 | X | 4 |

| Sheet B | 1 | 2 | 3 | 4 | 5 | 6 | 7 | 8 | Final |
| Slovenia 🔨 | 0 | 3 | 1 | 0 | 1 | 1 | 1 | X | 7 |
| Brazil | 1 | 0 | 0 | 1 | 0 | 0 | 0 | X | 2 |

| Sheet D | 1 | 2 | 3 | 4 | 5 | 6 | 7 | 8 | Final |
| New Zealand 🔨 | 2 | 0 | 1 | 0 | 1 | 0 | 2 | X | 6 |
| Poland | 0 | 5 | 0 | 2 | 0 | 2 | 0 | X | 9 |

| Sheet F | 1 | 2 | 3 | 4 | 5 | 6 | 7 | 8 | Final |
| Finland 🔨 | 4 | 4 | 1 | 2 | 0 | 6 | X | X | 17 |
| Puerto Rico | 0 | 0 | 0 | 0 | 1 | 0 | X | X | 1 |

=== Draw 11 ===
Wednesday, December 4, 12:30

| Sheet A | 1 | 2 | 3 | 4 | 5 | 6 | 7 | 8 | Final |
| Austria | 1 | 0 | 0 | 1 | 0 | 0 | 0 | X | 2 |
| Mexico 🔨 | 0 | 2 | 1 | 0 | 3 | 1 | 1 | X | 8 |

| Sheet C | 1 | 2 | 3 | 4 | 5 | 6 | 7 | 8 | Final |
| Belgium | 0 | 1 | 0 | 3 | 1 | 1 | 1 | 0 | 7 |
| Jamaica 🔨 | 3 | 0 | 1 | 0 | 0 | 0 | 0 | 4 | 8 |

| Sheet E | 1 | 2 | 3 | 4 | 5 | 6 | 7 | 8 | Final |
| Kyrgyzstan | 0 | 0 | 0 | 0 | 1 | 1 | 0 | 3 | 5 |
| Ireland 🔨 | 1 | 1 | 1 | 1 | 0 | 0 | 2 | 0 | 6 |

| Sheet B | 1 | 2 | 3 | 4 | 5 | 6 | 7 | 8 | Final |
| Turkey 🔨 | 2 | 2 | 1 | 2 | 0 | 5 | X | X | 12 |
| Saudi Arabia | 0 | 0 | 0 | 0 | 1 | 0 | X | X | 1 |

| Sheet D | 1 | 2 | 3 | 4 | 5 | 6 | 7 | 8 | Final |
| Romania | 0 | 1 | 0 | 0 | 1 | 0 | 2 | 0 | 4 |
| Hong Kong 🔨 | 2 | 0 | 2 | 1 | 0 | 1 | 0 | 1 | 7 |

| Sheet F | 1 | 2 | 3 | 4 | 5 | 6 | 7 | 8 | 9 | Final |
| Hungary 🔨 | 0 | 1 | 1 | 0 | 0 | 1 | 2 | 2 | 0 | 7 |
| Slovakia | 2 | 0 | 0 | 4 | 1 | 0 | 0 | 0 | 1 | 8 |

=== Draw 12 ===
Wednesday, December 4, 16:00

| Sheet A | 1 | 2 | 3 | 4 | 5 | 6 | 7 | 8 | 9 | Final |
| Spain | 1 | 0 | 3 | 0 | 0 | 1 | 0 | 1 | 1 | 7 |
| Guyana 🔨 | 0 | 2 | 0 | 2 | 1 | 0 | 1 | 0 | 0 | 6 |

| Sheet D | 1 | 2 | 3 | 4 | 5 | 6 | 7 | 8 | Final |
| Finland 🔨 | 1 | 0 | 2 | 1 | 0 | 2 | 1 | X | 7 |
| Philippines | 0 | 1 | 0 | 0 | 2 | 0 | 0 | X | 3 |

| Sheet F | 1 | 2 | 3 | 4 | 5 | 6 | 7 | 8 | Final |
| New Zealand 🔨 | 4 | 0 | 2 | 2 | 1 | 2 | X | X | 11 |
| India | 0 | 1 | 0 | 0 | 0 | 0 | X | X | 1 |

| Sheet C | 1 | 2 | 3 | 4 | 5 | 6 | 7 | 8 | Final |
| Chinese Taipei | 0 | 1 | 0 | 1 | 0 | 0 | 1 | X | 3 |
| England 🔨 | 2 | 0 | 1 | 0 | 3 | 1 | 0 | X | 7 |

| Sheet E | 1 | 2 | 3 | 4 | 5 | 6 | 7 | 8 | Final |
| Poland 🔨 | 0 | 0 | 4 | 0 | 5 | 5 | X | X | 14 |
| Puerto Rico | 1 | 1 | 0 | 2 | 0 | 0 | X | X | 4 |

=== Draw 13 ===
Wednesday, December 4, 19:30

| Sheet B | 1 | 2 | 3 | 4 | 5 | 6 | 7 | 8 | Final |
| Hong Kong | 0 | 1 | 1 | 0 | 0 | 1 | 1 | X | 4 |
| Hungary 🔨 | 2 | 0 | 0 | 4 | 1 | 0 | 0 | X | 7 |

| Sheet D | 1 | 2 | 3 | 4 | 5 | 6 | 7 | 8 | Final |
| Latvia 🔨 | 0 | 1 | 1 | 2 | 1 | 0 | 5 | X | 10 |
| Belgium | 1 | 0 | 0 | 0 | 0 | 1 | 0 | X | 2 |

| Sheet F | 1 | 2 | 3 | 4 | 5 | 6 | 7 | 8 | Final |
| Romania | 0 | 1 | 1 | 1 | 0 | 1 | 0 | 1 | 5 |
| Jamaica 🔨 | 1 | 0 | 0 | 0 | 2 | 0 | 1 | 0 | 4 |

| Sheet C | 1 | 2 | 3 | 4 | 5 | 6 | 7 | 8 | Final |
| Ireland | 0 | 3 | 0 | 0 | 1 | 1 | 1 | 0 | 6 |
| Austria 🔨 | 2 | 0 | 1 | 1 | 0 | 0 | 0 | 1 | 5 |

| Sheet E | 1 | 2 | 3 | 4 | 5 | 6 | 7 | 8 | Final |
| Turkey 🔨 | 0 | 2 | 1 | 2 | 0 | 0 | 2 | X | 7 |
| Portugal | 1 | 0 | 0 | 0 | 1 | 1 | 0 | X | 3 |

=== Draw 14 ===
Thursday, December 5, 9:00

| Sheet A | 1 | 2 | 3 | 4 | 5 | 6 | 7 | 8 | Final |
| Puerto Rico | 0 | 0 | 0 | 0 | 0 | 1 | X | X | 1 |
| Philippines 🔨 | 4 | 1 | 1 | 1 | 2 | 0 | X | X | 9 |

| Sheet C | 1 | 2 | 3 | 4 | 5 | 6 | 7 | 8 | Final |
| Ukraine | 0 | 0 | 1 | 1 | 0 | 1 | 0 | X | 3 |
| New Zealand 🔨 | 3 | 1 | 0 | 0 | 4 | 0 | 1 | X | 9 |

| Sheet E | 1 | 2 | 3 | 4 | 5 | 6 | 7 | 8 | Final |
| Mexico 🔨 | 0 | 3 | 0 | 4 | 2 | 2 | X | X | 11 |
| Saudi Arabia | 1 | 0 | 1 | 0 | 0 | 0 | X | X | 2 |

| Sheet B | 1 | 2 | 3 | 4 | 5 | 6 | 7 | 8 | Final |
| Lithuania 🔨 | 0 | 0 | 2 | 0 | 1 | 0 | 0 | X | 3 |
| Poland | 2 | 3 | 0 | 2 | 0 | 2 | 3 | X | 12 |

| Sheet D | 1 | 2 | 3 | 4 | 5 | 6 | 7 | 8 | Final |
| Slovenia | 2 | 0 | 0 | 1 | 0 | 0 | 2 | 0 | 5 |
| Spain 🔨 | 0 | 2 | 1 | 0 | 2 | 2 | 0 | 1 | 8 |

| Sheet F | 1 | 2 | 3 | 4 | 5 | 6 | 7 | 8 | Final |
| Greece | 1 | 1 | 0 | 0 | 5 | 1 | 0 | X | 8 |
| England 🔨 | 0 | 0 | 1 | 1 | 0 | 0 | 1 | X | 3 |

=== Draw 15 ===
Thursday, December 5, 12:30

| Sheet A | 1 | 2 | 3 | 4 | 5 | 6 | 7 | 8 | Final |
| Ireland | 0 | 1 | 0 | 0 | 0 | 1 | X | X | 2 |
| Turkey 🔨 | 3 | 0 | 2 | 1 | 2 | 0 | X | X | 8 |

| Sheet C | 1 | 2 | 3 | 4 | 5 | 6 | 7 | 8 | Final |
| Hungary | 2 | 0 | 0 | 1 | 0 | 1 | 0 | X | 4 |
| Latvia 🔨 | 0 | 5 | 1 | 0 | 2 | 0 | 2 | X | 10 |

| Sheet F | 1 | 2 | 3 | 4 | 5 | 6 | 7 | 8 | Final |
| Hong Kong 🔨 | 5 | 1 | 1 | 1 | 1 | 1 | X | X | 10 |
| Belgium | 0 | 0 | 0 | 0 | 0 | 0 | X | X | 0 |

| Sheet B | 1 | 2 | 3 | 4 | 5 | 6 | 7 | 8 | Final |
| Portugal 🔨 | 5 | 2 | 0 | 2 | 0 | 0 | 0 | 0 | 9 |
| Austria | 0 | 0 | 3 | 0 | 2 | 3 | 1 | 2 | 11 |

| Sheet D | 1 | 2 | 3 | 4 | 5 | 6 | 7 | 8 | Final |
| Jamaica | 0 | 0 | 1 | 0 | / | | | | L^ |
| Slovakia 🔨 | 2 | 2 | 0 | 1 | | | | | W |

^A player on Jamaica was injured during the fifth end, forcing them to forfeit the match.

=== Draw 16 ===
Thursday, December 5, 16:00

| Sheet A | 1 | 2 | 3 | 4 | 5 | 6 | 7 | 8 | Final |
| Saudi Arabia 🔨 | 0 | 1 | 0 | 2 | 0 | 3 | 0 | 5 | 11 |
| Kyrgyzstan | 1 | 0 | 2 | 0 | 2 | 0 | 3 | 0 | 8 |

| Sheet C | 1 | 2 | 3 | 4 | 5 | 6 | 7 | 8 | Final |
| Brazil | 0 | 0 | 0 | 3 | 0 | 1 | 0 | 0 | 4 |
| Chinese Taipei 🔨 | 1 | 1 | 1 | 0 | 1 | 0 | 2 | 2 | 8 |

| Sheet E | 1 | 2 | 3 | 4 | 5 | 6 | 7 | 8 | Final |
| Puerto Rico 🔨 | 0 | 0 | 0 | 0 | 1 | 0 | X | X | 1 |
| India | 2 | 1 | 4 | 1 | 0 | 1 | X | X | 9 |

| Sheet B | 1 | 2 | 3 | 4 | 5 | 6 | 7 | 8 | Final |
| Greece | 0 | 0 | 0 | 2 | 0 | 1 | 0 | X | 3 |
| Guyana 🔨 | 1 | 3 | 1 | 0 | 2 | 0 | 3 | X | 10 |

| Sheet D | 1 | 2 | 3 | 4 | 5 | 6 | 7 | 8 | Final |
| Lithuania 🔨 | 2 | 0 | 0 | 0 | 0 | 0 | 1 | X | 3 |
| Finland | 0 | 1 | 2 | 1 | 0 | 3 | 0 | X | 7 |

| Sheet F | 1 | 2 | 3 | 4 | 5 | 6 | 7 | 8 | Final |
| Poland 🔨 | 3 | 1 | 0 | 1 | 0 | 5 | X | X | 10 |
| Ukraine | 0 | 0 | 1 | 0 | 1 | 0 | X | X | 2 |

== Playoffs ==
=== A Bracket ===
Qualifier 1
A1 | Latvia | 11
C2 | Guyana | 3
A1 | Latvia | 7
D2 | New Zealand | 9
B1 | Turkey | 1
D2 | New Zealand | 7

Qualifier 2
C1 | Spain | 7
B2 | Portugal | 6
C1 | Spain | 7
A2 | Slovakia | 5
D1 | Finland | 6
A2 | Slovakia | 8

=== B Bracket ===
| | | | Qualifier 3 |
| | | | A2 | Slovakia | 3 |
| C2 | Guyana | 3 | B1 | Turkey | 15 |
| B1 | Turkey | 11 |

| | | | Qualifier 4 |
| | | | A1 | Latvia | 6 |
| B2 | Portugal | 6 | D1 | Finland | 9 |
| D1 | Finland | 7 |

=== A Event ===
==== Semifinals ====
Friday, December 6, 10:00

| Sheet B | 1 | 2 | 3 | 4 | 5 | 6 | 7 | 8 | Final |
| Latvia 🔨 | 1 | 3 | 4 | 0 | 1 | 2 | X | X | 11 |
| Guyana | 0 | 0 | 0 | 3 | 0 | 0 | X | X | 3 |

| Sheet C | 1 | 2 | 3 | 4 | 5 | 6 | 7 | 8 | Final |
| Spain 🔨 | 3 | 1 | 0 | 1 | 0 | 1 | 0 | 1 | 7 |
| Portugal | 0 | 0 | 3 | 0 | 2 | 0 | 1 | 0 | 6 |

| Sheet D | 1 | 2 | 3 | 4 | 5 | 6 | 7 | 8 | Final |
| Turkey | 0 | 0 | 0 | 1 | 0 | 0 | 0 | X | 1 |
| New Zealand 🔨 | 2 | 1 | 1 | 0 | 1 | 1 | 1 | X | 7 |

| Sheet E | 1 | 2 | 3 | 4 | 5 | 6 | 7 | 8 | Final |
| Finland | 0 | 2 | 0 | 0 | 2 | 0 | 2 | 0 | 6 |
| Slovakia 🔨 | 1 | 0 | 1 | 3 | 0 | 2 | 0 | 1 | 8 |

==== Finals ====
Friday, December 6, 15:00

| Sheet C | 1 | 2 | 3 | 4 | 5 | 6 | 7 | 8 | Final |
| Latvia 🔨 | 3 | 0 | 2 | 1 | 0 | 0 | 1 | 0 | 7 |
| New Zealand | 0 | 2 | 0 | 0 | 1 | 4 | 0 | 2 | 9 |

| Sheet D | 1 | 2 | 3 | 4 | 5 | 6 | 7 | 8 | Final |
| Spain 🔨 | 0 | 0 | 2 | 1 | 2 | 0 | 2 | 0 | 7 |
| Slovakia | 1 | 1 | 0 | 0 | 0 | 1 | 0 | 2 | 5 |

=== B Event ===
==== Semifinals ====
Friday, December 6, 15:00

| Sheet B | 1 | 2 | 3 | 4 | 5 | 6 | 7 | 8 | 9 | Final |
| Portugal | 3 | 0 | 0 | 2 | 0 | 0 | 1 | 0 | 0 | 6 |
| Finland 🔨 | 0 | 2 | 1 | 0 | 1 | 1 | 0 | 1 | 1 | 7 |

| Sheet E | 1 | 2 | 3 | 4 | 5 | 6 | 7 | 8 | Final |
| Guyana 🔨 | 0 | 0 | 1 | 0 | 2 | 0 | X | X | 3 |
| Turkey | 1 | 3 | 0 | 4 | 0 | 3 | X | X | 11 |

==== Finals ====
Saturday, December 7, 10:00

| Sheet C | 1 | 2 | 3 | 4 | 5 | 6 | 7 | 8 | Final |
| Slovakia | 0 | 2 | 0 | 0 | 1 | 0 | X | X | 3 |
| Turkey 🔨 | 5 | 0 | 6 | 1 | 0 | 3 | X | X | 15 |

| Sheet D | 1 | 2 | 3 | 4 | 5 | 6 | 7 | 8 | Final |
| Latvia 🔨 | 1 | 1 | 0 | 0 | 3 | 0 | 1 | 0 | 6 |
| Finland | 0 | 0 | 1 | 1 | 0 | 4 | 0 | 3 | 9 |
