= Mixed Doubles Players' Championship =

The Mixed Doubles Players' Championship is an annual mixed doubles curling tournament on the Mixed Doubles Super Series curling tour. It was held annually at the Brant Curling Club in Brantford, Ontario from 2022 to 2025, and was held at the Dundas Granite Curling Club in Dundas, Ontario in 2026. The purse of $20,000 has attracted teams from across the world.

The event has been held since the 2022–23 season, the first season of the Mixed Doubles Super Series. The event acts as the series' championship, and is the final event of series. In 2022, the event was known as the Eppic Ale Players Championship, and was streamed on CBC's website and on CBC Gem. The first event was held using a triple knockout format. It is organized by Wayne Tuck Jr. and Jay Allen. It idea behind the Super Series was to help mixed doubles teams in Canada in their road to qualifying for the 2026 Winter Olympics.

Prior to the Super Series, a Mixed Doubles Players' Championship was held at the Leduc Recreation Centre in Leduc, Alberta, in March 2022. CurlingZone considers it to be the same event.

== Past champions ==
Year	Winning pair	Runner up pair	Semifinalists	Winners share ($CA)
2022 (Mar.)	(Alberta) Kelsey Rocque / (Ontario) John Epping	(Alberta) Chelsea Carey / (Saskatchewan) Rylan Kleiter	(Ontario) Clancy Grandy / Patrick Janssen & (Ontario) Jennifer Jones / Brent Laing	$5,000
2022 (Dec.)	(Estonia) Marie Kaldvee / Harri Lill	(Switzerland) Jenny Perret / Martin Rios	(Ontario) Kira Brunton / Brad Jacobs & (Saskatchewan) Jennifer Armstrong / Brayden Stewart	$7,500
2024	(Estonia) Marie Kaldvee / Harri Lill	(Norway) Kristin Skaslien / Magnus Nedregotten	(Ontario) Jennifer Jones / Brent Laing & (Ontario) Lisa Weagle / John Epping	$6,000
2025	(Estonia) Marie Kaldvee / Harri Lill	(Norway) Kristin Skaslien / Magnus Nedregotten	(Ontario) Riley Sandham / Brendan Craig & (Ontario) Terri Weeks / Sam Steep	$6,000
2026	(Manitoba) Kadriana Lott / Colton Lott	(Poland) Adela Walczak / Andrzej Augustyniak	(Ontario) Paige Ferguson / Fionn Keon	
