= 2024 World Mixed Doubles Curling Championship =

Curling tournament in Sweden

- Host city: Östersund, Sweden
- Arena: Östersund Arena
- Dates: April 20–27, 2024
- Winner: Sweden
- Female: Isabella Wranå
- Male: Rasmus Wranå
- Coach: Andreas Prytz
- Finalist: Estonia (Kaldvee / Lill)

The 2024 World Mixed Doubles Curling Championship was held from April 20 to 27, 2024 at the Östersund Arena in Östersund, Sweden. The event was held alongside the 2024 World Senior Curling Championships.

== Qualification ==
The following nations qualified to participate in the 2024 World Mixed Doubles Curling Championship:

Means of Qualification	Vacancies	Qualified
2023 World Mixed Doubles Curling Championship	16	United States; Japan; Norway; Canada; Estonia; Scotland; Switzerland; Australia; Denmark; Sweden; Italy; Turkey; Spain; Netherlands; Czech Republic; South Korea
2023 World Mixed Doubles Qualification Event	4	Germany; France; New Zealand; China
TOTAL	20	

== Teams ==
The teams are listed as follows:

Australia	Canada	China	Czech Republic
Female: Tahli Gill; Male: Dean Hewitt	Female: Kadriana Lott; Male: Colton Lott	Female: Yang Ying; Male: Tian Jiafeng	Female: Zuzana Paulová; Male: Tomáš Paul
Denmark	Estonia	France	Germany
Female: Jasmin Lander; Male: Henrik Holtermann	Female: Marie Kaldvee; Male: Harri Lill	Female: Kseniya Shevchuk; Male: Wilfrid Coulot	Female: Lena Kapp; Male: Sixten Totzek
Italy	Japan	Netherlands	New Zealand
Female: Stefania Constantini; Male: Francesco De Zanna	Female: Miyu Ueno; Male: Tsuyoshi Yamaguchi	Female: Vanessa Tonoli; Male: Wouter Gösgens	Female: Courtney Smith; Male: Anton Hood
Norway	Scotland	South Korea	Spain
Female: Kristin Skaslien; Male: Magnus Nedregotten	Female: Sophie Jackson; Male: Duncan McFadzean	Female: Kim Ji-yoon; Male: Jeong Byeong-jin	Female: Oihane Otaegi; Male: Mikel Unanue
Sweden	Switzerland	Turkey	United States
Female: Isabella Wranå; Male: Rasmus Wranå	Female: Briar Schwaller-Hürlimann; Male: Yannick Schwaller	Female: Dilşat Yıldız; Male: Bilal Ömer Çakır	Female: Becca Hamilton; Male: Matt Hamilton

=== WCF ranking ===
Year to date World Curling Federation order of merit ranking for each team prior to the event.

Nation (Team)	Rank	Points
Estonia (Kaldvee / Lill)	2	159.3
Norway (Skaslien / Nedregotten)	3	157.3
Canada (K. Lott / C. Lott)	11	95.6
Australia (Gill / Hewitt)	18	79.3
South Korea (Kim / Jeong)	28	65.6
China (Yang / Tian)	30	61.8
Switzerland (Schwaller-Hürlimann / Schwaller)	38	51.1
United States (B. Hamilton / M. Hamilton)	39	50.3
Sweden (I. Wranå / R. Wranå)	47	43.8
Spain (Otaegi / Unanue)	48	43.5
Denmark (Lander / Holtermann)	52	42.9
Czech Republic (Paulová / Paul)	55	41.1
France (Shevchuk / Coulot)	81	24.3
Turkey (Yıldız / Çakır)	108	15.0
Japan (Ueno / Yamaguchi)	109	15.0
New Zealand (Smith / Hood)	115	14.0
Germany (Kapp / Totzek)	118	13.0
Netherlands (Tonoli / Gösgens)	161	8.4
Scotland (Jackson / McFadzean)	266	3.0
Italy (Constantini / De Zanna)	596	0.0

== Round robin standings ==
Final Round Robin Standings

Key
Teams to Playoffs
Teams to Relegation Playoff
Teams relegated to 2024 Qualification Event

Group A	Athletes	W	L	W–L	PF	PA	EW	EL	BE	SE	S%	DSC
Norway	Kristin Skaslien / Magnus Nedregotten	7	2	–	63	40	38	32	1	12	79.6%	25.43
Switzerland	Briar Schwaller-Hürlimann / Yannick Schwaller	6	3	2–1; 1–0	67	42	38	28	0	14	77.9%	23.78
Estonia	Marie Kaldvee / Harri Lill	6	3	2–1; 0–1	65	47	32	33	1	7	77.2%	30.26
Italy	Stefania Constantini / Francesco De Zanna	6	3	1–2; 1–0	62	46	40	28	0	18	78.3%	59.48
Japan	Miyu Ueno / Tsuyoshi Yamaguchi	6	3	1–2; 0–1	56	52	35	35	0	11	79.4%	23.38
Germany	Lena Kapp / Sixten Totzek	4	5	1–0	50	59	33	36	0	7	70.5%	30.51
Denmark	Jasmin Lander / Henrik Holtermann	4	5	0–1	58	64	35	37	0	12	77.8%	37.21
Turkey	Dilşat Yıldız / Bilal Ömer Çakır	3	6	–	47	58	33	32	0	9	73.4%	38.88
France	Kseniya Shevchuk / Wilfrid Coulot	2	7	–	48	75	27	39	0	4	66.8%	45.18
Spain	Oihane Otaegi / Mikel Unanue	1	8	–	36	69	26	37	0	5	66.4%	41.97

Group B	Athletes	W	L	W–L	PF	PA	EW	EL	BE	SE	S%	DSC
Sweden	Isabella Wranå / Rasmus Wranå	8	1	1–0	60	39	37	27	0	11	82.8%	23.58
Canada	Kadriana Lott / Colton Lott	8	1	0–1	82	34	39	23	0	17	85.3%	20.86
Scotland	Sophie Jackson / Duncan McFadzean	6	3	–	57	50	33	33	0	10	76.0%	18.21
South Korea	Kim Ji-yoon / Jeong Byeong-jin	5	4	1–0	55	51	35	31	0	15	76.1%	27.25
United States	Becca Hamilton / Matt Hamilton	5	4	0–1	59	53	38	30	0	19	75.7%	40.83
China	Yang Ying / Tian Jiafeng	3	6	2–1; 1–0	47	63	28	39	0	10	71.8%	48.86
Netherlands	Vanessa Tonoli / Wouter Gösgens	3	6	2–1; 0–1	40	57	26	37	0	9	72.5%	28.23
Australia	Tahli Gill / Dean Hewitt	3	6	1–2; 1–0	51	61	36	35	0	15	77.3%	34.20
Czech Republic	Zuzana Paulová / Tomáš Paul	3	6	1–2; 0–1	44	57	30	32	0	11	68.1%	28.53
New Zealand	Courtney Smith / Anton Hood	1	8	–	32	62	24	39	0	5	66.9%	38.70

Group A Round Robin Summary Table
Pos.	Country	Denmark	Estonia	France	Germany	Italy	Japan	Norway	Spain	Switzerland	Turkey	Record
7	Denmark	—	8–7	8–10	4–6	4–9	3–8	7–6	10–7	9–4	5–7	4–5
3	Estonia	7–8	—	8–3	10–2	8–6	7–4	4–9	10–2	4–8	7–5	6–3
9	France	10–8	3–8	—	5–9	6–10	8–7	2–8	6–10	4–8	4–7	2–7
6	Germany	6–4	2–10	9–5	—	6–8	5–7	4–7	7–4	3–9	8–5	4–5
4	Italy	9–4	6–8	10–6	8–6	—	8–2	4–7	5–2	4–8	8–3	6–3
5	Japan	8–3	4–7	7–8	7–5	2–8	—	6–5	7–4	8–7	7–5	6–3
1	Norway	6–7	9–4	8–2	7–4	7–4	5–6	—	9–3	6–5	6–5	7–2
10	Spain	7–10	2–10	10–6	4–7	2–5	4–7	3–9	—	1–8	3–7	1–8
2	Switzerland	4–9	8–4	8–4	9–3	8–4	7–8	5–6	8–1	—	10–3	6–3
8	Turkey	7–5	5–7	7–4	5–8	3–8	5–7	5–6	7–3	3–10	—	3–6

Group B Round Robin Summary Table
Pos.	Country	Australia	Canada	China	Czech Republic	Netherlands	New Zealand	Scotland	South Korea	Sweden	United States	Record
8	Australia	—	4–11	5–6	7–6	4–9	7–2	5–7	6–5	6–7	7–8	3–6
2	Canada	11–4	—	10–4	8–3	11–0	7–2	12–5	6–4	5–6	12–6	8–1
6	China	6–5	4–10	—	2–9	9–5	8–4	4–6	5–7	3–9	6–8	3–6
9	Czech Republic	6–7	3–8	9–2	—	1–7	8–6	3–7	3–9	4–7	7–4	3–6
7	Netherlands	9–4	0–11	5–9	7–1	—	6–2	5–7	6–7	2–6	0–10	3–6
10	New Zealand	2–7	2–7	4–8	6–8	2–6	—	3–9	8–5	1–7	4–5	1–8
3	Scotland	7–5	5–12	6–4	7–3	7–5	9–3	—	4–6	8–4	4–8	6–3
4	South Korea	5–6	4–6	7–5	9–3	7–6	5–8	6–4	—	5–8	7–5	5–4
1	Sweden	7–6	6–5	9–3	7–4	6–2	7–1	4–8	8–5	—	6–5	8–1
5	United States	8–7	6–12	8–6	4–7	10–0	5–4	8–4	5–7	5–6	—	5–4

== Round robin results ==
All draw times are listed in Central European Time (UTC+01:00).

=== Draw 1 ===
Saturday, April 20, 10:00 am

Sheet A	1	2	3	4	5	6	7	8	Final
Denmark (Lander / Holtermann)	1	0	2	0	1	0	0	0	4
Germany (Kapp / Totzek)	0	2	0	1	0	1	1	1	6

Sheet B	1	2	3	4	5	6	7	8	Final
Spain (Otaegi / Unanue)	0	0	0	1	0	1	0	X	2
Italy (Constantini / De Zanna)	1	1	1	0	1	0	1	X	5

Sheet C	1	2	3	4	5	6	7	8	Final
Turkey (Yıldız / Çakır)	0	1	2	0	1	0	1	X	5
Estonia (Kaldvee / Lill)	4	0	0	1	0	2	0	X	7

Sheet D	1	2	3	4	5	6	7	8	Final
Switzerland (Schwaller-Hürlimann / Schwaller)	1	0	1	0	3	0	3	X	8
France (Shevchuk / Coulot)	0	2	0	1	0	1	0	X	4

Sheet E	1	2	3	4	5	6	7	8	Final
Norway (Skaslien / Nedregotten)	0	0	1	1	1	0	2	0	5
Japan (Ueno / Yamaguchi)	1	1	0	0	0	2	0	2	6

=== Draw 2 ===
Saturday, April 20, 2:00 pm

Sheet A	1	2	3	4	5	6	7	8	Final
Scotland (Jackson / McFadzean)	0	0	0	1	2	1	3	X	7
Czech Republic (Paulová / Paul)	1	1	1	0	0	0	0	X	3

Sheet B	1	2	3	4	5	6	7	8	Final
China (Yang / Tian)	0	3	0	2	0	1	0	3	9
Netherlands (Tonoli / Gösgens)	1	0	1	0	1	0	2	0	5

Sheet C	1	2	3	4	5	6	7	8	Final
Sweden (I. Wranå / R. Wranå)	1	0	0	2	0	2	0	1	6
United States (B. Hamilton / M. Hamilton)	0	1	2	0	1	0	1	0	5

Sheet D	1	2	3	4	5	6	7	8	Final
New Zealand (Smith / Hood)	0	0	1	0	0	1	X	X	2
Canada (K. Lott / C. Lott)	2	2	0	2	1	0	X	X	7

Sheet E	1	2	3	4	5	6	7	8	9	Final
South Korea (Kim / Jeong)	0	1	0	0	1	2	1	0	0	5
Australia (Gill / Hewitt)	1	0	1	2	0	0	0	1	1	6

=== Draw 3 ===
Saturday, April 20, 6:00 pm

Sheet A	1	2	3	4	5	6	7	8	Final
Italy (Constantini / De Zanna)	0	1	0	1	0	2	0	0	4
Switzerland (Schwaller-Hürlimann / Schwaller)	2	0	1	0	1	0	2	2	8

Sheet B	1	2	3	4	5	6	7	8	Final
Germany (Kapp / Totzek)	2	2	1	0	2	0	2	X	9
France (Shevchuk / Coulot)	0	0	0	2	0	3	0	X	5

Sheet C	1	2	3	4	5	6	7	8	Final
Norway (Skaslien / Nedregotten)	1	0	1	0	3	0	1	0	6
Denmark (Lander / Holtermann)	0	3	0	2	0	1	0	1	7

Sheet D	1	2	3	4	5	6	7	8	Final
Japan (Ueno / Yamaguchi)	0	1	1	0	2	0	0	0	4
Estonia (Kaldvee / Lill)	2	0	0	1	0	1	2	1	7

Sheet E	1	2	3	4	5	6	7	8	Final
Spain (Otaegi / Unanue)	0	1	1	0	0	1	0	X	3
Turkey (Yıldız / Çakır)	1	0	0	2	1	0	3	X	7

=== Draw 4 ===
Sunday, April 21, 10:00 am

Sheet A	1	2	3	4	5	6	7	8	Final
Netherlands (Tonoli / Gösgens)	0	2	1	1	1	1	0	X	6
New Zealand (Smith / Hood)	1	0	0	0	0	0	1	X	2

Sheet B	1	2	3	4	5	6	7	8	Final
Czech Republic (Paulová / Paul)	0	1	0	1	1	0	X	X	3
Canada (K. Lott / C. Lott)	2	0	4	0	0	2	X	X	8

Sheet C	1	2	3	4	5	6	7	8	Final
South Korea (Kim / Jeong)	1	1	1	0	1	0	2	X	6
Scotland (Jackson / McFadzean)	0	0	0	1	0	3	0	X	4

Sheet D	1	2	3	4	5	6	7	8	Final
Australia (Gill / Hewitt)	0	2	0	0	2	0	2	1	7
United States (B. Hamilton / M. Hamilton)	1	0	1	2	0	4	0	0	8

Sheet E	1	2	3	4	5	6	7	8	Final
China (Yang / Tian)	0	0	3	0	0	0	X	X	3
Sweden (I. Wranå / R. Wranå)	1	4	0	2	1	1	X	X	9

=== Draw 5 ===
Sunday, April 21, 2:00 pm

Sheet A	1	2	3	4	5	6	7	8	Final
Estonia (Kaldvee / Lill)	4	0	0	0	2	4	X	X	10
Spain (Otaegi / Unanue)	0	1	0	1	0	0	X	X	2

Sheet B	1	2	3	4	5	6	7	8	Final
Denmark (Lander / Holtermann)	1	0	1	0	0	1	0	X	3
Japan (Ueno / Yamaguchi)	0	1	0	2	1	0	4	X	8

Sheet C	1	2	3	4	5	6	7	8	Final
Germany (Kapp / Totzek)	0	0	0	1	2	0	0	X	3
Switzerland (Schwaller-Hürlimann / Schwaller)	4	1	1	0	0	1	2	X	9

Sheet D	1	2	3	4	5	6	7	8	Final
Turkey (Yıldız / Çakır)	0	0	1	1	0	2	0	1	5
Norway (Skaslien / Nedregotten)	0	3	0	0	1	0	2	0	6

Sheet E	1	2	3	4	5	6	7	8	Final
Italy (Constantini / De Zanna)	0	5	1	1	0	2	1	X	10
France (Shevchuk / Coulot)	3	0	0	0	3	0	0	X	6

=== Draw 6 ===
Sunday, April 21, 6:00 pm

Sheet A	1	2	3	4	5	6	7	8	Final
United States (B. Hamilton / M. Hamilton)	0	0	1	0	3	0	3	1	8
China (Yang / Tian)	1	1	0	3	0	1	0	0	6

Sheet B	1	2	3	4	5	6	7	8	9	Final
Scotland (Jackson / McFadzean)	1	0	0	1	0	1	2	0	2	7
Australia (Gill / Hewitt)	0	1	1	0	1	0	0	2	0	5

Sheet C	1	2	3	4	5	6	7	8	Final
Czech Republic (Paulová / Paul)	3	0	0	1	1	0	0	3	8
New Zealand (Smith / Hood)	0	2	1	0	0	1	2	0	6

Sheet D	1	2	3	4	5	6	7	8	Final
Sweden (I. Wranå / R. Wranå)	1	1	0	0	3	0	3	X	8
South Korea (Kim / Jeong)	0	0	1	1	0	3	0	X	5

Sheet E	1	2	3	4	5	6	7	8	Final
Netherlands (Tonoli / Gösgens)	0	0	0	0	0	0	X	X	0
Canada (K. Lott / C. Lott)	2	2	2	3	1	1	X	X	11

=== Draw 7 ===
Monday, April 22, 10:00 am

Sheet A	1	2	3	4	5	6	7	8	Final
France (Shevchuk / Coulot)	1	0	0	0	0	0	1	X	2
Norway (Skaslien / Nedregotten)	0	1	1	1	2	3	0	X	8

Sheet B	1	2	3	4	5	6	7	8	Final
Turkey (Yıldız / Çakır)	0	0	0	1	0	2	X	X	3
Switzerland (Schwaller-Hürlimann / Schwaller)	3	2	2	0	3	0	X	X	10

Sheet C	1	2	3	4	5	6	7	8	Final
Japan (Ueno / Yamaguchi)	0	0	1	0	0	1	0	X	2
Italy (Constantini / De Zanna)	1	1	0	2	1	0	3	X	8

Sheet D	1	2	3	4	5	6	7	8	9	Final
Estonia (Kaldvee / Lill)	2	0	1	0	4	0	0	0	0	7
Denmark (Lander / Holtermann)	0	2	0	1	0	2	1	1	1	8

Sheet E	1	2	3	4	5	6	7	8	Final
Germany (Kapp / Totzek)	2	0	2	0	2	0	1	0	7
Spain (Otaegi / Unanue)	0	1	0	1	0	1	0	1	4

=== Draw 8 ===
Monday, April 22, 2:00 pm

Sheet A	1	2	3	4	5	6	7	8	Final
Canada (K. Lott / C. Lott)	0	0	0	3	2	0	1	X	6
South Korea (Kim / Jeong)	1	1	1	0	0	1	0	X	4

Sheet B	1	2	3	4	5	6	7	8	Final
Sweden (I. Wranå / R. Wranå)	1	3	1	0	1	1	X	X	7
New Zealand (Smith / Hood)	0	0	0	1	0	0	X	X	1

Sheet C	1	2	3	4	5	6	7	8	Final
Australia (Gill / Hewitt)	0	1	1	1	0	1	0	X	4
Netherlands (Tonoli / Gösgens)	2	0	0	0	2	0	5	X	9

Sheet D	1	2	3	4	5	6	7	8	Final
United States (B. Hamilton / M. Hamilton)	1	1	2	4	0	0	0	X	8
Scotland (Jackson / McFadzean)	0	0	0	0	2	1	1	X	4

Sheet E	1	2	3	4	5	6	7	8	Final
Czech Republic (Paulová / Paul)	3	2	1	2	0	1	X	X	9
China (Yang / Tian)	0	0	0	0	2	0	X	X	2

=== Draw 9 ===
Monday, April 22, 6:00 pm

Sheet A	1	2	3	4	5	6	7	8	Final
Turkey (Yıldız / Çakır)	1	0	0	1	0	1	0	X	3
Italy (Constantini / De Zanna)	0	2	2	0	1	0	3	X	8

Sheet B	1	2	3	4	5	6	7	8	Final
Norway (Skaslien / Nedregotten)	3	0	2	0	0	1	0	1	7
Germany (Kapp / Totzek)	0	1	0	1	1	0	1	0	4

Sheet C	1	2	3	4	5	6	7	8	Final
Denmark (Lander / Holtermann)	3	0	4	0	1	0	0	0	8
France (Shevchuk / Coulot)	0	4	0	1	0	3	1	1	10

Sheet D	1	2	3	4	5	6	7	8	Final
Spain (Otaegi / Unanue)	0	0	0	1	0	1	2	X	4
Japan (Ueno / Yamaguchi)	2	2	2	0	1	0	0	X	7

Sheet E	1	2	3	4	5	6	7	8	Final
Switzerland (Schwaller-Hürlimann / Schwaller)	2	0	2	1	0	2	1	X	8
Estonia (Kaldvee / Lill)	0	1	0	0	3	0	0	X	4

=== Draw 10 ===
Tuesday, April 23, 10:00 am

Sheet A	1	2	3	4	5	6	7	8	Final
Sweden (I. Wranå / R. Wranå)	1	1	0	2	0	1	1	X	6
Netherlands (Tonoli / Gösgens)	0	0	1	0	1	0	0	X	2

Sheet B	1	2	3	4	5	6	7	8	Final
South Korea (Kim / Jeong)	5	0	0	1	0	3	X	X	9
Czech Republic (Paulová / Paul)	0	1	1	0	1	0	X	X	3

Sheet C	1	2	3	4	5	6	7	8	Final
Scotland (Jackson / McFadzean)	1	0	0	1	0	3	0	X	5
Canada (K. Lott / C. Lott)	0	3	1	0	2	0	6	X	12

Sheet D	1	2	3	4	5	6	7	8	9	Final
China (Yang / Tian)	0	0	0	1	1	0	2	1	1	6
Australia (Gill / Hewitt)	1	1	1	0	0	2	0	0	0	5

Sheet E	1	2	3	4	5	6	7	8	Final
New Zealand (Smith / Hood)	0	2	0	0	0	1	0	1	4
United States (B. Hamilton / M. Hamilton)	1	0	1	1	1	0	1	0	5

=== Draw 11 ===
Tuesday, April 23, 2:00 pm

Sheet A	1	2	3	4	5	6	7	8	Final
Norway (Skaslien / Nedregotten)	1	0	5	0	2	0	1	X	9
Estonia (Kaldvee / Lill)	0	1	0	1	0	2	0	X	4

Sheet B	1	2	3	4	5	6	7	8	Final
Italy (Constantini / De Zanna)	1	2	0	0	2	0	1	3	9
Denmark (Lander / Holtermann)	0	0	1	1	0	2	0	0	4

Sheet C	1	2	3	4	5	6	7	8	Final
Switzerland (Schwaller-Hürlimann / Schwaller)	3	1	1	0	2	1	X	X	8
Spain (Otaegi / Unanue)	0	0	0	1	0	0	X	X	1

Sheet D	1	2	3	4	5	6	7	8	Final
France (Shevchuk / Coulot)	0	0	1	1	0	2	0	X	4
Turkey (Yıldız / Çakır)	2	2	0	0	1	0	2	X	7

Sheet E	1	2	3	4	5	6	7	8	Final
Japan (Ueno / Yamaguchi)	1	0	1	0	2	0	3	0	7
Germany (Kapp / Totzek)	0	1	0	2	0	1	0	1	5

=== Draw 12 ===
Tuesday, April 23, 6:00 pm

Sheet A	1	2	3	4	5	6	7	8	Final
South Korea (Kim / Jeong)	0	2	1	0	0	2	0	2	7
United States (B. Hamilton / M. Hamilton)	1	0	0	1	1	0	2	0	5

Sheet B	1	2	3	4	5	6	7	8	Final
Netherlands (Tonoli / Gösgens)	0	1	0	2	1	1	0	0	5
Scotland (Jackson / McFadzean)	2	0	2	0	0	0	1	2	7

Sheet C	1	2	3	4	5	6	7	8	Final
New Zealand (Smith / Hood)	2	0	0	1	0	1	0	0	4
China (Yang / Tian)	0	1	3	0	1	0	2	1	8

Sheet D	1	2	3	4	5	6	7	8	Final
Canada (K. Lott / C. Lott)	0	0	1	0	2	0	1	1	5
Sweden (I. Wranå / R. Wranå)	1	1	0	2	0	2	0	0	6

Sheet E	1	2	3	4	5	6	7	8	Final
Australia (Gill / Hewitt)	1	1	0	0	2	1	0	2	7
Czech Republic (Paulová / Paul)	0	0	4	1	0	0	1	0	6

=== Draw 13 ===
Wednesday, April 24, 10:00 am

Sheet A	1	2	3	4	5	6	7	8	Final
Spain (Otaegi / Unanue)	0	5	0	1	2	0	2	X	10
France (Shevchuk / Coulot)	2	0	2	0	0	2	0	X	6

Sheet B	1	2	3	4	5	6	7	8	Final
Japan (Ueno / Yamaguchi)	0	2	1	1	0	2	0	1	7
Turkey (Yıldız / Çakır)	1	0	0	0	3	0	1	0	5

Sheet C	1	2	3	4	5	6	7	8	Final
Estonia (Kaldvee / Lill)	2	0	1	2	0	3	2	X	10
Germany (Kapp / Totzek)	0	1	0	0	1	0	0	X	2

Sheet D	1	2	3	4	5	6	7	8	Final
Norway (Skaslien / Nedregotten)	0	3	0	2	0	0	1	1	7
Italy (Constantini / De Zanna)	1	0	1	0	1	1	0	0	4

Sheet E	1	2	3	4	5	6	7	8	Final
Denmark (Lander / Holtermann)	1	1	1	0	2	0	3	1	9
Switzerland (Schwaller-Hürlimann / Schwaller)	0	0	0	1	0	3	0	0	4

=== Draw 14 ===
Wednesday, April 24, 2:00 pm

Sheet A	1	2	3	4	5	6	7	8	Final
China (Yang / Tian)	0	2	0	2	0	0	0	0	4
Canada (K. Lott / C. Lott)	1	0	1	0	1	1	2	4	10

Sheet B	1	2	3	4	5	6	7	8	Final
Australia (Gill / Hewitt)	0	1	1	0	2	0	2	0	6
Sweden (I. Wranå / R. Wranå)	2	0	0	1	0	3	0	1	7

Sheet C	1	2	3	4	5	6	7	8	Final
United States (B. Hamilton / M. Hamilton)	0	1	1	0	0	1	1	0	4
Czech Republic (Paulová / Paul)	1	0	0	2	2	0	0	2	7

Sheet D	1	2	3	4	5	6	7	8	Final
South Korea (Kim / Jeong)	1	0	2	1	0	1	0	2	7
Netherlands (Tonoli / Gösgens)	0	3	0	0	1	0	2	0	6

Sheet E	1	2	3	4	5	6	7	8	Final
Scotland (Jackson / McFadzean)	2	0	1	0	2	0	4	X	9
New Zealand (Smith / Hood)	0	1	0	1	0	1	0	X	3

=== Draw 15 ===
Wednesday, April 24, 6:00 pm

Sheet A	1	2	3	4	5	6	7	8	Final
Germany (Kapp / Totzek)	1	0	2	2	0	0	0	3	8
Turkey (Yıldız / Çakır)	0	1	0	0	2	1	1	0	5

Sheet B	1	2	3	4	5	6	7	8	9	Final
Switzerland (Schwaller-Hürlimann / Schwaller)	0	1	1	0	1	0	2	0	0	5
Norway (Skaslien / Nedregotten)	1	0	0	2	0	1	0	1	1	6

Sheet C	1	2	3	4	5	6	7	8	9	Final
France (Shevchuk / Coulot)	0	0	4	0	1	0	2	0	1	8
Japan (Ueno / Yamaguchi)	1	1	0	3	0	1	0	1	0	7

Sheet D	1	2	3	4	5	6	7	8	Final
Denmark (Lander / Holtermann)	0	0	3	0	2	2	0	3	10
Spain (Otaegi / Unanue)	2	3	0	1	0	0	1	0	7

Sheet E	1	2	3	4	5	6	7	8	Final
Estonia (Kaldvee / Lill)	2	0	0	2	1	0	0	3	8
Italy (Constantini / De Zanna)	0	3	1	0	0	1	1	0	6

=== Draw 16 ===
Thursday, April 25, 10:00 am

Sheet A	1	2	3	4	5	6	7	8	Final
Czech Republic (Paulová / Paul)	1	0	1	0	1	0	1	X	4
Sweden (I. Wranå / R. Wranå)	0	3	0	3	0	1	0	X	7

Sheet B	1	2	3	4	5	6	7	8	Final
New Zealand (Smith / Hood)	2	0	0	1	1	4	0	X	8
South Korea (Kim / Jeong)	0	2	2	0	0	0	1	X	5

Sheet C	1	2	3	4	5	6	7	8	Final
Canada (K. Lott / C. Lott)	2	1	0	2	0	3	3	X	11
Australia (Gill / Hewitt)	0	0	1	0	3	0	0	X	4

Sheet D	1	2	3	4	5	6	7	8	Final
Scotland (Jackson / McFadzean)	1	1	0	2	0	0	2	X	6
China (Yang / Tian)	0	0	1	0	2	1	0	X	4

Sheet E	1	2	3	4	5	6	7	8	Final
United States (B. Hamilton / M. Hamilton)	2	2	2	2	1	1	X	X	10
Netherlands (Tonoli / Gösgens)	0	0	0	0	0	0	X	X	0

=== Draw 17 ===
Thursday, April 25, 2:00 pm

Sheet A	1	2	3	4	5	6	7	8	Final
Switzerland (Schwaller-Hürlimann / Schwaller)	0	1	2	0	0	2	0	2	7
Japan (Ueno / Yamaguchi)	2	0	0	2	1	0	3	0	8

Sheet B	1	2	3	4	5	6	7	8	Final
France (Shevchuk / Coulot)	1	0	0	1	0	1	0	X	3
Estonia (Kaldvee / Lill)	0	1	1	0	3	0	3	X	8

Sheet C	1	2	3	4	5	6	7	8	Final
Spain (Otaegi / Unanue)	0	0	1	0	1	1	0	0	3
Norway (Skaslien / Nedregotten)	3	1	0	1	0	0	2	2	9

Sheet D	1	2	3	4	5	6	7	8	Final
Italy (Constantini / De Zanna)	0	1	0	2	3	1	0	1	8
Germany (Kapp / Totzek)	2	0	2	0	0	0	2	0	6

Sheet E	1	2	3	4	5	6	7	8	Final
Turkey (Yıldız / Çakır)	1	1	0	0	3	0	1	1	7
Denmark (Lander / Holtermann)	0	0	3	1	0	1	0	0	5

=== Draw 18 ===
Thursday, April 25, 6:00 pm

Sheet A	1	2	3	4	5	6	7	8	Final
New Zealand (Smith / Hood)	0	1	0	0	0	1	X	X	2
Australia (Gill / Hewitt)	1	0	1	3	2	0	X	X	7

Sheet B	1	2	3	4	5	6	7	8	Final
Canada (K. Lott / C. Lott)	3	0	2	0	1	0	6	X	12
United States (B. Hamilton / M. Hamilton)	0	1	0	2	0	3	0	X	6

Sheet C	1	2	3	4	5	6	7	8	Final
China (Yang / Tian)	0	0	0	2	2	1	0	X	5
South Korea (Kim / Jeong)	1	1	1	0	0	0	4	X	7

Sheet D	1	2	3	4	5	6	7	8	Final
Netherlands (Tonoli / Gösgens)	1	3	0	1	1	1	X	X	7
Czech Republic (Paulová / Paul)	0	0	1	0	0	0	X	X	1

Sheet E	1	2	3	4	5	6	7	8	Final
Sweden (I. Wranå / R. Wranå)	0	2	0	1	0	1	0	X	4
Scotland (Jackson / McFadzean)	1	0	2	0	2	0	3	X	8

== Relegation playoff ==
Friday, April 26, 10:00 am

Sheet A	1	2	3	4	5	6	7	8	Final
Turkey (Yıldız / Çakır)	1	0	1	0	2	0	0	X	4
Czech Republic (Paulová / Paul)	0	3	0	2	0	1	2	X	8

Player percentages
Turkey		Czech Republic	
Dilşat Yıldız	85%	Zuzana Paulová	86%
Bilal Ömer Çakır	66%	Tomáš Paul	74%
Total	73%	Total	79%

Sheet E	1	2	3	4	5	6	7	8	Final
Australia (Gill / Hewitt)	1	0	1	0	1	0	4	0	7
France (Shevchuk / Coulot)	0	2	0	1	0	1	0	1	5

Player percentages
Australia		France	
Tahli Gill	70%	Kseniya Shevchuk	65%
Dean Hewitt	71%	Wilfrid Coulot	60%
Total	71%	Total	62%

== Playoffs ==
Qualification games
B2	Canada	5
A3	Estonia	6
A2	Switzerland	8
B3	Scotland	6

Semifinals
A1	Norway	6
A3	Estonia	8
B1	Sweden	6
A2	Switzerland	3

Final
A3	Estonia	4
B1	Sweden	8
Bronze medal game
A1	Norway	6
A2	Switzerland	5

=== Qualification Games ===
Friday, April 26, 10:00 am

Sheet B	1	2	3	4	5	6	7	8	Final
Switzerland (Schwaller-Hürlimann / Schwaller)	0	0	1	1	2	0	4	0	8
Scotland (Jackson / McFadzean)	1	1	0	0	0	2	0	2	6

Player percentages
Switzerland		Scotland	
Briar Schwaller-Hürlimann	82%	Sophie Jackson	67%
Yannick Schwaller	67%	Duncan McFadzean	79%
Total	72%	Total	74%

Sheet D	1	2	3	4	5	6	7	8	9	Final
Canada (K. Lott / C. Lott)	1	0	1	0	2	0	1	0	0	5
Estonia (Kaldvee / Lill)	0	2	0	1	0	1	0	1	1	6

Player percentages
Canada		Estonia	
Kadriana Lott	78%	Marie Kaldvee	82%
Colton Lott	84%	Harri Lill	81%
Total	82%	Total	81%

=== Semifinals ===
Friday, April 26, 6:00 pm

Sheet B	1	2	3	4	5	6	7	8	Final
Norway (Skaslien / Nedregotten)	0	2	0	2	0	2	0	0	6
Estonia (Kaldvee / Lill)	1	0	1	0	3	0	2	1	8

Player percentages
Norway		Estonia	
Kristin Skaslien	77%	Marie Kaldvee	84%
Magnus Nedregotten	92%	Harri Lill	69%
Total	86%	Total	75%

Sheet D	1	2	3	4	5	6	7	8	Final
Sweden (I. Wranå / R. Wranå)	1	0	0	2	0	2	1	X	6
Switzerland (Schwaller-Hürlimann / Schwaller)	0	1	1	0	1	0	0	X	3

Player percentages
Sweden		Switzerland	
Isabella Wranå	87%	Briar Schwaller-Hürlimann	72%
Rasmus Wranå	90%	Yannick Schwaller	72%
Total	88%	Total	72%

=== Bronze medal game ===
Saturday, April 27, 10:00 am

Sheet C	1	2	3	4	5	6	7	8	Final
Norway (Skaslien / Nedregotten)	1	0	1	0	3	0	0	1	6
Switzerland (Schwaller-Hürlimann / Schwaller)	0	1	0	2	0	1	1	0	5

Player percentages
Norway		Switzerland	
Kristin Skaslien	82%	Briar Schwaller-Hürlimann	63%
Magnus Nedregotten	89%	Yannick Schwaller	76%
Total	86%	Total	71%

=== Final ===
Saturday, April 27, 2:00 pm

Sheet C	1	2	3	4	5	6	7	8	Final
Estonia (Kaldvee / Lill)	1	0	0	1	0	2	0	0	4
Sweden (I. Wranå / R. Wranå)	0	2	1	0	2	0	2	1	8

Player percentages
Estonia		Sweden	
Marie Kaldvee	64%	Isabella Wranå	75%
Harri Lill	77%	Rasmus Wranå	84%
Total	72%	Total	81%

== Statistics ==
=== Player percentages ===
Final Round Robin Percentages

Key
All-Star Team

Female	%
(Canada) Kadriana Lott	88.4
(Sweden) Isabella Wranå	80.9
(Italy) Stefania Constantini	77.0
(Scotland) Sophie Jackson	77.0
(Denmark) Jasmin Lander	75.9
(Norway) Kristin Skaslien	75.9
(Switzerland) Briar Schwaller-Hürlimann	75.4
(Japan) Miyu Ueno	75.4
(Australia) Tahli Gill	74.6
(United States) Becca Hamilton	74.3
(Turkey) Dilşat Yıldız	73.1
(South Korea) Kim Ji-yoon	72.4
(Estonia) Marie Kaldvee	71.1
(Czech Republic) Zuzana Paulová	69.7
(Germany) Lena Kapp	69.6
(Netherlands) Vanessa Tonoli	67.7
(China) Yang Ying	67.5
(France) Kseniya Shevchuk	65.3
(New Zealand) Courtney Smith	63.2
(Spain) Oihane Otaegi	61.7

Male	%
(Sweden) Rasmus Wranå	84.0
(Canada) Colton Lott	83.3
(Norway) Magnus Nedregotten	82.0
(Japan) Tsuyoshi Yamaguchi	82.0
(Estonia) Harri Lill	81.2
(Switzerland) Yannick Schwaller	79.4
(Italy) Francesco De Zanna	79.2
(Denmark) Henrik Holtermann	79.1
(Australia) Dean Hewitt	79.0
(South Korea) Jeong Byeong-jin	78.4
(United States) Matt Hamilton	76.7
(Netherlands) Wouter Gösgens	75.7
(Scotland) Duncan McFadzean	75.4
(China) Tian Jiafeng	74.6
(Turkey) Bilal Ömer Çakır	73.6
(Germany) Sixten Totzek	71.2
(New Zealand) Anton Hood	69.4
(Spain) Mikel Unanue	69.4
(France) Wilfrid Coulot	67.7
(Czech Republic) Tomáš Paul	67.1

== Final standings ==
Key
Teams relegated to 2024 World Mixed Doubles Qualification Event

Place	Team
1st place, gold medalist(s)	Sweden
2nd place, silver medalist(s)	Estonia
3rd place, bronze medalist(s)	Norway
4	Switzerland
5	Canada
6	Scotland
7	South Korea
8	Italy
9	Japan
10	United States
11	Germany
12	China
13	Netherlands
14	Denmark
15	Australia
16	Czech Republic
17	Turkey
18	France
19	New Zealand
20	Spain
