= Harri Lill =

Estonian curler and coach (born 1991)

- Curler
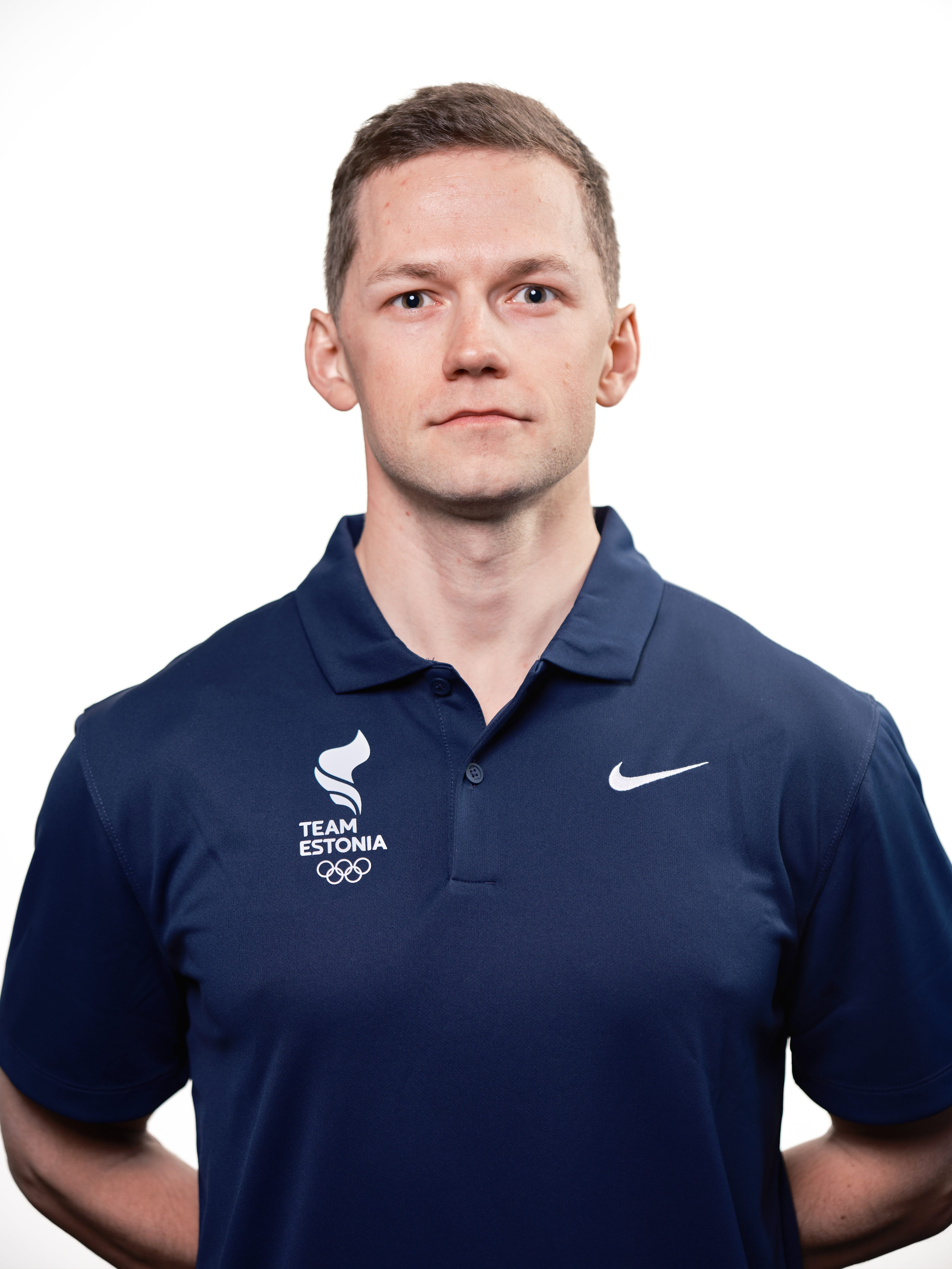
- Born: 22 July 1991 (age 35); Tallinn, Estonia

Team
- Curling club: Jeti Spordiklubi, Tallinn
- Mixed doubles partner: Karoliine Kaare

Curling career
- Member Association: Estonia
- World Mixed Doubles Championship: 10 (2016, 2018, 2019, 2021, 2022, 2023, 2024, 2025, 2026, 2027)
- European Championship: 10 (2008, 2009, 2010, 2011, 2012, 2013, 2014, 2017, 2018, 2019)
- Olympic: 1 (2026)
- Other appearances: European Mixed Championship: 3 (2009, 2011, 2013), European Junior Challenge: 7 (2006, 2007, 2009, 2010, 2011, 2012, 2013)
Medal record
Curling
Representing Estonia
World Mixed Doubles Championships
Silver medal – second place	2024 Östersund
Estonian Men's Curling Championship
Gold medal – first place	2005
Gold medal – first place	2008 Tallinn
Gold medal – first place	2009 Tallinn
Gold medal – first place	2010 Tallinn
Gold medal – first place	2011 Tallinn
Gold medal – first place	2014 Tallinn
Gold medal – first place	2017 Tallinn
Gold medal – first place	2018 Tallinn
Gold medal – first place	2019 Tallinn
Silver medal – second place	2007 Tallinn
Silver medal – second place	2013 Tallinn
Silver medal – second place	2016 Tallinn
Silver medal – second place	2020 Tallinn
Bronze medal – third place	2015 Tallinn
Bronze medal – third place	2021 Tallinn
European Junior Challenge
Bronze medal – third place	2010 Prague
Bronze medal – third place	2011 Prague

Harri Lill (born 22 July 1991) is an Estonian curler and curling coach.

== Career ==
Lill has focused for much of his career, and has found most of his international success in mixed doubles curling. Lill and partner Marie Kaldvee represented Estonia at the 2016 World Mixed Doubles Curling Championship. The team finished in 2nd place in their group with a 5–1 record, and ended up losing to China in the quarterfinals and settled for a 6th-place finish. In 2018 Lill and Kaldvee won the Estonian nationals and represented Estonia at the 2018 World Mixed Doubles Curling Championship. They went undefeated in group play, but lost in the round of 16 to Turkey. Turmann and Lill returned to represent Estonia at the 2019 World Mixed Doubles Curling Championship. They again won their group, with a 6–1 record, and made it as far as the quarterfinals where they lost to the United States.

Kaldvee and Lill would have a successful showing at the 2024 World Mixed Doubles Curling Championship, where they would finish in second place, losing the final to Sweden's Isabella Wranå and Rasmus Wranå 8–4. The following season, Kaldvee and Lill would have incredible success on the tour circuit, winning the Mixed Doubles Super Series: Calgary, Madtown Doubledown, Mixed Doubles Super Series: Fredericton, WCT Łódź Mixed Doubles Masters, and Mixed Doubles Players' Championship, and would also finish runner-up at the Gothenburg Mixed Doubles Cup. These results would have Kaldvee and Lill ranked #1 in the world going into the 2025 World Mixed Doubles Curling Championship. At the 2025 Worlds, Kaldvee and Lill would again have a successful tournament, going 6–3 in the round robin, and would beat Canada's Jocelyn Peterman and Brett Gallant in the quarterfinals before losing to eventual winners and 2022 Olympic Gold Medalists Stefania Constantini and Amos Mosaner from Italy in the semifinal, finishing in 4th place. These successful results over the 2024 and 2025 World Championships however, qualified Kaldvee and Lill for the 2026 Winter Olympics, marking Estonia's debut in curling at the Olympic Games.

== Teams ==
=== Men's ===
Season	Skip	Third	Second	Lead	Alternate	Coach	Events
2005–06	Harri Lill	Siim Sildnik	Jaanus Lindre	Tauri Eiber		Erkki Lill	EJCC 2006 (11th)
2006–07	Harri Lill	Siim Sildnik	Karl Kukner	Rauno Peebo		Erkki Lill	EJCC 2007 (4th)
2008–09	Erkki Lill	Harri Lill	Jaanus Lindre	Indrek Ernits	Tanel Telliskivi	Martin Lill	ECC 2008 (22nd)
2008–09	Harri Lill	Siim Sildnik	Rauno Peebo	Tanel Koll		Erkki Lill	EJCC 2009 (7th)
2009–10	Erkki Lill	Harri Lill	Jaanus Lindre	Toomas Lill	Tanel Telliskivi		ECC 2009 (17th)
2009–10	Eduard Veltsman	Aleksandr Vaganov	Janis Kiziridi	Mihhail Vlassov	Harri Lill		EJCC 2010 (bronze)
2010–11	Martin Lill	Siim Sildnik	Ingar Mäesalu	Jan Anderson	Harri Lill	Kristiine Lill	ECC 2010 (20th)
2010–11	Harri Lill	Siim Sildnik	Eduard Veltsman	Karl Kukner	Mihhail Vlassov		EJCC 2011 (bronze)
2011–12	Harri Lill	Erkki Lill	Jaanus Lindre	Tanel Telliskivi		Martin Lill	ECC 2011 (16th)
2011–12	Harri Lill	Eduard Jakovlev	Robert-Kent Päll	Sander Rouk		Martin Lill	EJCC 2012 (4th)
2012–13	Martin Lill	Ingar Mäesalu	Harri Lill	Jan Anderson	Siim Sildnik	Kristiine Lill	ECC 2012 (18th)
2012–13	Harri Lill	Robert-Kent Päll	Sander Rouk	Georgi Komarov	Eiko-Siim Peips	Martin Lill	EJCC 2013 (4th)
2013–14	Martin Lill	Harri Lill	Siim Sildnik	Ingar Mäesalu	Fred Randver	Fred Randver	ECC 2013 (15th)
2014–15	Martin Lill	Harri Lill	Siim Sildnik	Fred Randver	Robert-Kent Päll	Robert-Kent Päll	ECC 2014 (20th)
2016–17	Harri Lill	Siim Sildnik	Karl Kukner	Sten Andreas Enrlich	Kaarel Holm		
2016–17	Harri Lill	Siim Sildnik	Karl Kukner	Kaarel Holm			EstMCC 2017 (gold)
2017–18	Harri Lill	Karl Kukner	Tanel Toomväli	Kaarel Holm	Tarvin Kaldvee		ECC 2017 (24th)
2018–19	Harri Lill	Ingar Mäesalu	Karl Kukner	Tanel Toomväli	Mikk Reinsalu	Kristian Lindström	ECC 2018 (15th)
2019–20	Harri Lill	Tanel Toomvaeli	Karl Kukner	Andres Jakobson		Kristian Lindström	ECC 2019 (19th)

=== Mixed ===
Season	Skip	Third	Second	Lead	Alternate	Coach	Events
2009–10	Erkki Lill	Maile Mölder	Harri Lill	Maarja Koll	Küllike Ustav	Toomas Lill	EMxCC 2009 (17th)
2011–12	Erkki Lill	Maile Mölder	Harri Lill	Kaja Liik-Tamm			EMxCC 2011 (17th)
2013–14	Erkki Lill	Maile Mölder	Harri Lill	Küllike Ustav			EMxCC 2013 (22nd)
2016–17	Marie Turmann	Harri Lill	Liisa Turmann	Tarvin Kaldvee			EstMxCC 2017 (silver)

=== Mixed doubles ===
Season	Female	Male	Coach	Events
2015–16	Marie Turmann	Harri Lill	Brian Gray	WMDCC 2016 (6th)
2016–17	Marie Turmann	Harri Lill		EstMDCC 2017 (silver)
2017–18	Marie Turmann	Harri Lill	Nicole Strausak	WMDCC 2018 (13th)
2018–19	Marie Turmann	Harri Lill	Nicole Strausak	WMDCC 2019 (5th)
2020–21	Marie Turmann	Harri Lill	Nicole Strausak	WMDCC 2021 (19th)
2021–22	Marie Kaldvee	Harri Lill		OQE 2021 (10th); WMDCC 2022 (14th)
2022–23	Marie Kaldvee	Harri Lill	Magnus Nedregotten	WMDCC 2023 (5th)
2023–24	Marie Kaldvee	Harri Lill	Tomi Rantamäki	WMDCC 2024 (silver)
2024–25	Marie Kaldvee	Harri Lill	Steffen Walstad	WMDCC 2025 (4th)
2025–26	Marie Kaldvee	Harri Lill	Steffen Walstad	OWG 2026 (10th); WMDCC 2026 (7th)

== Record as a coach of national teams ==
Year	Tournament, event	National team	Place
2010	2010 European Curling Championships	Estonia (women)	17
2012	2012 Winter Youth Olympics	Estonia (mixed)	16
2012	2012 Winter Youth Olympics	Estonia (mixed doubles)	17
2012	2012 Winter Youth Olympics	Estonia (mixed doubles)	9
2016	2016 World Junior B Curling Championships	Estonia (junior women)	4
2019	2019 World Junior-B Curling Championships (January)	Estonia (junior women)	19
