= Bilal Ömer Çakır =

Turkish curler (born 1990)

- Curler
- Born: 2 January 1990 (age 36); Tercan, Turkey

Team
- Curling club: Milli Piyango CA, Erzurum
- Mixed doubles partner: Dilşat Yıldız

Curling career
- Member Association: Turkey
- World Mixed Doubles Championship: 3 (2023, 2024, 2025)
- World Mixed Championship: 2 (2015, 2018)
- European Championship: 4 (2013, 2014, 2016, 2017)

Bilal Ömer Çakır (born 2 January 1990 in Tercan) is a Turkish curler from Erzurum. He is the coach of the Turkey women's national curling team skipped by Dilşat Yıldız, who is also his mixed doubles partner.

== Career ==
=== Men's ===
Çakır joined the Turkish national men's team for the 2013–14 season at the second position. At the 2013 European Curling Championships, the team led by Alican Karataş finished 3–4 through the round robin of the B Division. The following year, with Çakır now playing lead, the team improved on their performance by finishing 4–3.

After not playing on the team in 2015, Çakır returned to the national team at second for the 2016 European Curling Championships. There, the Turkish team finished 5–2 through the round robin, earning them a tiebreaker berth. They then lost 12–5 to Slovakia's Juraj Gallo and were eliminated. The following year, Uğurcan Karagöz took over as skip of the team with Çakır moving up to third. This earned the team their best result as they qualified for the playoffs directly with a 5–2 record. They then immediately lost in the quarterfinals 9–4 to Finland's Aku Kauste, finishing fifth overall in the B Division that year. Çakır has not played on the men's team since the 2017–18 season.

=== Mixed ===
Çakır has represented Turkey at two World Mixed Curling Championships. In 2015, he played second on the team with skip Alican Karataş, third Dilşat Yıldız and lead Semiha Konuksever. They finished fourth in their group with a 4–4 record, not enough to make the playoffs. Three years later, he returned throwing fourth stones on the team skipped by Öznur Polat with second Oğuzhan Karakurt and Konuksever at lead. This combination earned the team a 6–2 record through the round robin, enough to qualify for the playoffs. They then stole a victory against Denmark in the qualification game before dropping the quarterfinals to Russia, the eventual bronze medalists from the event.

=== Mixed doubles ===
For the 2022–23 season, Çakır was named to the Turkish mixed doubles national team with partner Dilşat Yıldız. As Turkey had been relegated the year before, the team had to finish in the top four at the 2022 World Mixed Doubles Qualification Event to qualify for the 2023 World Mixed Doubles Curling Championship. At the qualification event, the pair went 4–1 in the round robin to qualify for the double knockout playoff. They won 9–7 over New Zealand in the first round before losing to Austria 9–3 in the second. This put them in the final qualifier against Finland where they stole in both the seventh and eighth ends for a 6–5 win and a berth in the World Championship. At Worlds, Yıldız and Çakır finished sixth in their group with a 4–5 record, scoring wins over Austria, England, Germany and Spain.

== Personal life ==
Çakır is employed as a teacher. He attended Atatürk University.

== Teams ==
Season	Skip	Third	Second	Lead	Alternate
2013–14	Alican Karataş	Ilhan Osmanagaoglu	Bilal Ömer Çakır	Murat Sağır	Muhammet Oǧuz Zengin
2014–15	Alican Karataş	Kadir Çakır	Muhammet Oǧuz Zengin	Bilal Ömer Çakır	Melik Şenol
2016–17	Alican Karataş	Uğurcan Karagöz	Bilal Ömer Çakır	Kadir Çakır	
2017–18	Uğurcan Karagöz	Bilal Ömer Çakır	Oğuzhan Karakurt	Muhammed Zeki Uçan	Emre Karaman
2018–19	Bilal Ömer Çakır	Muhammed Zeki Uçan	Muhammet Haydar Demirel	Ahmet Alperen Tunga	
