= 2023 World Mixed Doubles Curling Championship =

Curling tournament in South Korea

- Host city: Gangneung, South Korea
- Arena: Gangneung Curling Centre
- Dates: April 22–29, 2023
- Winner: United States
- Female: Cory Thiesse
- Male: Korey Dropkin
- Coach: Cathy Overton-Clapham
- Finalist: Japan (Matsumura / Tanida)

The 2023 World Mixed Doubles Curling Championship was held from April 22 to 29, 2023 at the Gangneung Curling Centre in Gangneung, South Korea. The event was held alongside the 2023 World Senior Curling Championships. Korey Dropkin and Cory Thiesse defeated Chiaki Matsumura and Yasumasa Tanida 8-2 in the final to win the gold medal.

== Qualification ==
The following nations qualified to participate in the 2023 World Mixed Doubles Curling Championship:

Means of Qualification	Vacancies	Qualified
2022 World Mixed Doubles Curling Championship	16	Scotland; Switzerland; Germany; Norway; Canada; Sweden; Italy; United States; Japan; Hungary; Australia; Denmark; Czech Republic; Estonia; England; South Korea
2022 World Mixed Doubles Qualification Event	4	Austria; Spain; Netherlands; Turkey
TOTAL	20	

== Teams ==
The teams are listed as follows:

Australia	Austria	Canada	Czech Republic
Female: Tahli Gill; Male: Dean Hewitt	Female: Hannah Augustin; Male: Martin Reichel	Female: Jennifer Jones; Male: Brent Laing	Female: Julie Zelingrová; Male: Vít Chabičovský
Denmark	England	Estonia	Germany
Female: Jasmin Lander; Male: Henrik Holtermann	Female: Lina Opel; Male: Michael Opel	Female: Marie Kaldvee; Male: Harri Lill	Female: Pia-Lisa Schöll; Male: Klaudius Harsch
Hungary	Italy	Japan	Netherlands
Female: Linda Joó; Male: Lőrinc Tatár	Female: Stefania Constantini; Male: Sebastiano Arman	Female: Chiaki Matsumura; Male: Yasumasa Tanida	Female: Vanessa Tonoli; Male: Wouter Gösgens
Norway	Scotland	South Korea	Spain
Female: Martine Rønning; Male: Mathias Brænden	Female: Jennifer Dodds; Male: Bruce Mouat	Female: Kim Ji-yoon; Male: Jeong Byeong-jin	Female: Oihane Otaegi; Male: Mikel Unanue
Sweden	Switzerland	Turkey	United States
Female: Therese Westman; Male: Robin Ahlberg	Female: Briar Schwaller-Hürlimann; Male: Yannick Schwaller	Female: Dilşat Yıldız; Male: Bilal Ömer Çakır	Female: Cory Thiesse; Male: Korey Dropkin

== Round robin standings ==
Final Round Robin Standings

Key
Teams to Playoffs
Teams to Relegation Playoff
Teams relegated to 2023 Qualification Event

Group A	Athletes	W	L	W–L	PF	PA	EW	EL	BE	SE	S%	DSC
Canada	Jennifer Jones / Brent Laing	8	1	–	72	44	39	29	0	11	78.1%	20.79
Estonia	Marie Kaldvee / Harri Lill	7	2	1–0	70	46	37	28	0	12	78.4%	39.89
Scotland	Jennifer Dodds / Bruce Mouat	7	2	0–1	63	48	34	32	0	8	80.8%	33.72
Australia	Tahli Gill / Dean Hewitt	5	4	–	58	63	34	36	0	7	77.1%	55.32
Denmark	Jasmin Lander / Henrik Holtermann	4	5	1–1	55	64	31	43	0	2	73.0%	33.35
Italy	Stefania Constantini / Sebastiano Arman	4	5	1–1	55	58	35	32	0	9	77.6%	35.03
Netherlands	Vanessa Tonoli / Wouter Gösgens	4	5	1–1	58	62	34	37	0	10	72.8%	40.47
Czech Republic	Julie Zelingrová / Vít Chabičovský	3	6	–	52	64	34	31	0	14	71.4%	25.06
South Korea	Kim Ji-yoon / Jeong Byeong-jin	2	7	–	60	71	31	37	0	6	73.9%	53.21
Hungary	Linda Joó / Lőrinc Tatár	1	8	–	46	69	31	39	0	9	69.6%	45.74

Group B	Athletes	W	L	W–L	PF	PA	EW	EL	BE	SE	S%	DSC
Japan	Chiaki Matsumura / Yasumasa Tanida	8	1	–	68	53	35	33	0	9	76.2%	20.18
United States	Cory Thiesse / Korey Dropkin	7	2	2–0	65	39	42	24	0	18	81.6%	24.05
Norway	Martine Rønning / Mathias Brænden	7	2	1–1	61	43	35	32	0	14	76.0%	24.66
Switzerland	Briar Schwaller-Hürlimann / Yannick Schwaller	7	2	0–2	63	45	36	30	0	13	79.1%	32.01
Sweden	Therese Westman / Robin Ahlberg	4	5	2–0	66	56	37	32	0	12	77.9%	36.49
Turkey	Dilşat Yıldız / Bilal Ömer Çakır	4	5	1–1	64	53	37	34	0	10	75.4%	57.25
Spain	Oihane Otaegi / Mikel Unanue	4	5	0–2	56	65	33	37	0	9	67.3%	29.67
Austria	Hannah Augustin / Martin Reichel	2	7	1–0	43	64	28	34	0	10	66.3%	60.43
Germany	Pia-Lisa Schöll / Klaudius Harsch	2	7	0–1	53	65	29	36	0	5	73.0%	37.74
England	Lina Opel / Michael Opel	0	9	–	26	82	21	39	0	7	53.8%	62.58

Group A Round Robin Summary Table
Pos.	Country	Australia	Canada	Czech Republic	Denmark	Estonia	Hungary	Italy	Netherlands	Scotland	South Korea	Record
4	Australia	—	6–11	3–9	9–7	3–9	7–5	7–1	7–6	6–8	10–7	5–4
1	Canada	11–6	—	8–3	8–2	4–7	8–7	8–4	10–5	8–4	7–6	8–1
8	Czech Republic	9–3	3–8	—	5–6	6–12	6–5	4–7	7–5	5–6	7–12	3–6
5	Denmark	7–9	2–8	6–5	—	7–6	5–6	11–9	7–8	1–7	9–6	4–5
2	Estonia	9–3	7–4	12–6	6–7	—	9–2	7–6	6–8	6–5	8–5	7–2
10	Hungary	5–7	7–8	5–6	6–5	2–9	—	4–8	6–8	6–7	5–11	1–8
6	Italy	1–7	4–8	7–4	9–11	6–7	8–4	—	8–6	6–8	6–3	4–5
7	Netherlands	6–7	5–10	5–7	8–7	8–6	8–6	6–8	—	4–7	8–4	4–5
3	Scotland	8–6	4–8	6–5	7–1	5–6	7–6	8–6	7–4	—	11–6	7–2
9	South Korea	7–10	6–7	12–7	6–9	5–8	11–5	3–6	4–8	6–11	—	2–7

Group B Round Robin Summary Table
Pos.	Country	Austria	England	Germany	Japan	Norway	Spain	Sweden	Switzerland	Turkey	United States	Record
8	Austria	—	8–2	11–6	2–9	2–6	5–7	2–10	5–7	6–7	2–10	2–7
10	England	2–8	—	3–8	7–12	2–9	3–9	3–10	2–11	2–8	2–7	0–9
9	Germany	6–11	8–3	—	6–7	4–6	6–7	9–4	7–8	6–12	1–7	2–7
1	Japan	9–2	12–7	7–6	—	10–8	7–5	8–7	1–9	7–4	7–5	8–1
3	Norway	6–2	9–2	6–4	8–10	—	7–6	9–5	7–5	6–4	3–5	7–2
7	Spain	7–5	9–3	7–6	5–7	6–7	—	2–11	7–8	4–10	9–8	4–5
5	Sweden	10–2	10–3	4–9	7–8	5–9	11–2	—	4–8	9–8	6–7	4–5
4	Switzerland	7–5	11–2	8–7	9–1	5–7	8–7	8–4	—	5–4	2–8	7–2
6	Turkey	7–6	8–2	12–6	4–7	4–6	10–4	8–9	4–5	—	7–8	4–5
2	United States	10–2	7–2	7–1	5–7	5–3	8–9	7–6	8–2	8–7	—	7–2

== Round robin results ==
All draw times are listed in Korean Standard Time (UTC+09:00).

=== Draw 1 ===
Saturday, April 22, 10:00 am

Sheet A	1	2	3	4	5	6	7	8	Final
South Korea (Kim / Jeong) 🔨	3	1	0	0	4	0	3	X	11
Hungary (Joó / Tatár)	0	0	2	1	0	2	0	X	5

Sheet B	1	2	3	4	5	6	7	8	9	Final
Netherlands (Tonoli / Gösgens)	1	0	1	0	0	3	0	1	0	6
Australia (Gill / Hewitt) 🔨	0	1	0	1	1	0	3	0	1	7

Sheet C	1	2	3	4	5	6	7	8	Final
Canada (Jones / Laing) 🔨	4	1	0	1	0	2	0	X	8
Scotland (Dodds / Mouat)	0	0	1	0	2	0	1	X	4

Sheet D	1	2	3	4	5	6	7	8	Final
Italy (Constantini / Arman) 🔨	0	1	0	3	1	0	2	X	7
Czech Republic (Zelingrová / Chabičovský)	1	0	2	0	0	1	0	X	4

Sheet E	1	2	3	4	5	6	7	8	Final
Estonia (Kaldvee / Lill)	0	2	0	1	0	2	1	0	6
Denmark (Lander / Holtermann) 🔨	1	0	4	0	1	0	0	1	7

=== Draw 2 ===
Saturday, April 22, 2:00 pm

Sheet A	1	2	3	4	5	6	7	8	Final
Japan (Matsumura / Tanida) 🔨	3	0	1	0	1	1	0	1	7
Germany (Schöll / Harsch)	0	1	0	1	0	0	4	0	6

Sheet B	1	2	3	4	5	6	7	8	9	Final
Spain (Otaegi / Unanue) 🔨	1	0	0	0	1	0	2	2	0	6
Norway (Rønning / Brænden)	0	2	1	2	0	1	0	0	1	7

Sheet C	1	2	3	4	5	6	7	8	Final
Switzerland (Schwaller-Hürlimann / Schwaller) 🔨	2	2	3	3	0	1	X	X	11
England (Opel / Opel)	0	0	0	0	2	0	X	X	2

Sheet D	1	2	3	4	5	6	7	8	Final
Turkey (Yıldız / Çakır) 🔨	0	2	0	2	0	1	2	0	7
Austria (Augustin / Reichel)	2	0	2	0	1	0	0	1	6

Sheet E	1	2	3	4	5	6	7	8	9	Final
United States (Thiesse / Dropkin)	2	1	0	0	1	0	2	0	1	7
Sweden (Westman / Ahlberg) 🔨	0	0	2	1	0	2	0	1	0	6

=== Draw 3 ===
Saturday, April 22, 6:00 pm

Sheet A	1	2	3	4	5	6	7	8	Final
Australia (Gill / Hewitt)	0	2	2	1	1	1	X	X	7
Italy (Constantini / Arman) 🔨	1	0	0	0	0	0	X	X	1

Sheet B	1	2	3	4	5	6	7	8	Final
Hungary (Joó / Tatár) 🔨	0	0	0	0	2	0	1	2	5
Czech Republic (Zelingrová / Chabičovský)	1	1	2	1	0	1	0	0	6

Sheet C	1	2	3	4	5	6	7	8	Final
Estonia (Kaldvee / Lill)	0	3	0	2	0	0	2	1	8
South Korea (Kim / Jeong) 🔨	1	0	1	0	2	1	0	0	5

Sheet D	1	2	3	4	5	6	7	8	Final
Denmark (Lander / Holtermann)	0	0	1	0	0	0	X	X	1
Scotland (Dodds / Mouat) 🔨	3	1	0	1	1	1	X	X	7

Sheet E	1	2	3	4	5	6	7	8	Final
Netherlands (Tonoli / Gösgens)	0	0	1	0	3	0	1	0	5
Canada (Jones / Laing) 🔨	2	1	0	3	0	1	0	3	10

=== Draw 4 ===
Sunday, April 23, 10:00 am

Sheet A	1	2	3	4	5	6	7	8	Final
Norway (Rønning / Brænden)	1	2	0	2	0	1	0	X	6
Turkey (Yıldız / Çakır) 🔨	0	0	2	0	1	0	1	X	4

Sheet B	1	2	3	4	5	6	7	8	Final
Germany (Schöll / Harsch) 🔨	4	0	0	1	0	0	1	X	6
Austria (Augustin / Reichel)	0	1	3	0	5	2	0	X	11

Sheet C	1	2	3	4	5	6	7	8	Final
United States (Thiesse / Dropkin) 🔨	1	0	1	0	2	0	1	0	5
Japan (Matsumura / Tanida)	0	1	0	2	0	2	0	2	7

Sheet D	1	2	3	4	5	6	7	8	Final
Sweden (Westman / Ahlberg) 🔨	3	2	0	0	3	1	1	X	10
England (Opel / Opel)	0	0	2	1	0	0	0	X	3

Sheet E	1	2	3	4	5	6	7	8	9	Final
Spain (Otaegi / Unanue) 🔨	1	0	0	0	2	1	0	3	0	7
Switzerland (Schwaller-Hürlimann / Schwaller)	0	1	1	1	0	0	4	0	1	8

=== Draw 5 ===
Sunday, April 23, 2:00 pm

Sheet A	1	2	3	4	5	6	7	8	Final
Scotland (Dodds / Mouat)	2	0	2	0	1	0	2	X	7
Netherlands (Tonoli / Gösgens) 🔨	0	1	0	2	0	1	0	X	4

Sheet B	1	2	3	4	5	6	7	8	Final
South Korea (Kim / Jeong)	0	1	1	0	2	0	2	0	6
Denmark (Lander / Holtermann) 🔨	4	0	0	2	0	2	0	1	9

Sheet C	1	2	3	4	5	6	7	8	Final
Hungary (Joó / Tatár) 🔨	2	0	0	1	0	1	0	X	4
Italy (Constantini / Arman)	0	3	1	0	2	0	2	X	8

Sheet D	1	2	3	4	5	6	7	8	Final
Canada (Jones / Laing) 🔨	2	0	1	0	0	1	0	0	4
Estonia (Kaldvee / Lill)	0	1	0	1	1	0	2	2	7

Sheet E	1	2	3	4	5	6	7	8	Final
Australia (Gill / Hewitt)	0	0	0	0	3	0	0	X	3
Czech Republic (Zelingrová / Chabičovský) 🔨	1	1	1	3	0	1	2	X	9

=== Draw 6 ===
Sunday, April 23, 6:00 pm

Sheet A	1	2	3	4	5	6	7	8	Final
England (Opel / Opel)	0	1	0	0	1	0	1	X	3
Spain (Otaegi / Unanue) 🔨	2	0	2	3	0	2	0	X	9

Sheet B	1	2	3	4	5	6	7	8	9	Final
Japan (Matsumura / Tanida)	0	4	0	0	2	0	1	0	1	8
Sweden (Westman / Ahlberg) 🔨	1	0	2	1	0	1	0	2	0	7

Sheet C	1	2	3	4	5	6	7	8	Final
Germany (Schöll / Harsch)	0	1	0	2	0	3	0	X	6
Turkey (Yıldız / Çakır) 🔨	3	0	2	0	3	0	4	X	12

Sheet D	1	2	3	4	5	6	7	8	Final
Switzerland (Schwaller-Hürlimann / Schwaller)	0	0	0	0	2	0	0	X	2
United States (Thiesse / Dropkin) 🔨	1	1	1	1	0	1	3	X	8

Sheet E	1	2	3	4	5	6	7	8	Final
Norway (Rønning / Brænden) 🔨	1	1	1	2	0	0	1	X	6
Austria (Augustin / Reichel)	0	0	0	0	1	1	0	X	2

=== Draw 7 ===
Monday, April 24, 10:00 am

Sheet A	1	2	3	4	5	6	7	8	Final
Czech Republic (Zelingrová / Chabičovský)	0	0	3	0	3	0	X	X	6
Estonia (Kaldvee / Lill) 🔨	5	1	0	3	0	3	X	X	12

Sheet B	1	2	3	4	5	6	7	8	Final
Canada (Jones / Laing) 🔨	0	0	2	0	2	0	2	2	8
Italy (Constantini / Arman)	1	1	0	1	0	1	0	0	4

Sheet C	1	2	3	4	5	6	7	8	9	Final
Denmark (Lander / Holtermann) 🔨	2	0	1	0	3	0	0	1	0	7
Australia (Gill / Hewitt)	0	2	0	2	0	2	1	0	2	9

Sheet D	1	2	3	4	5	6	7	8	Final
Scotland (Dodds / Mouat) 🔨	4	0	3	1	0	3	X	X	11
South Korea (Kim / Jeong)	0	3	0	0	3	0	X	X	6

Sheet E	1	2	3	4	5	6	7	8	Final
Hungary (Joó / Tatár)	0	0	0	3	1	1	1	0	6
Netherlands (Tonoli / Gösgens) 🔨	3	2	1	0	0	0	0	2	8

=== Draw 8 ===
Monday, April 24, 2:00 pm

Sheet A	1	2	3	4	5	6	7	8	Final
Austria (Augustin / Reichel)	0	1	0	0	1	0	X	X	2
United States (Thiesse / Dropkin) 🔨	4	0	1	2	0	3	X	X	10

Sheet B	1	2	3	4	5	6	7	8	Final
Switzerland (Schwaller-Hürlimann / Schwaller) 🔨	2	0	1	0	0	1	0	1	5
Turkey (Yıldız / Çakır)	0	1	0	1	1	0	1	0	4

Sheet C	1	2	3	4	5	6	7	8	Final
Sweden (Westman / Ahlberg) 🔨	1	0	1	2	1	0	0	0	5
Norway (Rønning / Brænden)	0	3	0	0	0	3	1	2	9

Sheet D	1	2	3	4	5	6	7	8	Final
England (Opel / Opel)	1	0	1	4	0	1	0	X	7
Japan (Matsumura / Tanida) 🔨	0	4	0	0	4	0	4	X	12

Sheet E	1	2	3	4	5	6	7	8	Final
Germany (Schöll / Harsch) 🔨	0	1	1	0	1	0	0	3	6
Spain (Otaegi / Unanue)	1	0	0	4	0	1	1	0	7

=== Draw 9 ===
Monday, April 24, 6:00 pm

Sheet A	1	2	3	4	5	6	7	8	Final
Canada (Jones / Laing) 🔨	1	2	0	2	1	0	5	X	11
Australia (Gill / Hewitt)	0	0	2	0	0	4	0	X	6

Sheet B	1	2	3	4	5	6	7	8	Final
Estonia (Kaldvee / Lill) 🔨	1	2	1	2	0	3	X	X	9
Hungary (Joó / Tatár)	0	0	0	0	2	0	X	X	2

Sheet C	1	2	3	4	5	6	7	8	Final
South Korea (Kim / Jeong)	0	4	0	4	1	0	3	X	12
Czech Republic (Zelingrová / Chabičovský) 🔨	4	0	1	0	0	2	0	X	7

Sheet D	1	2	3	4	5	6	7	8	9	Final
Netherlands (Tonoli / Gösgens)	2	0	3	0	1	1	0	0	1	8
Denmark (Lander / Holtermann) 🔨	0	2	0	3	0	0	1	1	0	7

Sheet E	1	2	3	4	5	6	7	8	Final
Italy (Constantini / Arman)	0	1	0	1	0	2	0	2	6
Scotland (Dodds / Mouat) 🔨	3	0	2	0	2	0	1	0	8

=== Draw 10 ===
Tuesday, April 25, 10:00 am

Sheet A	1	2	3	4	5	6	7	8	Final
Switzerland (Schwaller-Hürlimann / Schwaller)	0	1	0	1	1	0	2	X	5
Norway (Rønning / Brænden) 🔨	1	0	1	0	0	5	0	X	7

Sheet B	1	2	3	4	5	6	7	8	Final
United States (Thiesse / Dropkin) 🔨	2	0	1	2	1	1	X	X	7
Germany (Schöll / Harsch)	0	1	0	0	0	0	X	X	1

Sheet C	1	2	3	4	5	6	7	8	Final
Japan (Matsumura / Tanida) 🔨	0	2	1	1	2	0	3	X	9
Austria (Augustin / Reichel)	1	0	0	0	0	1	0	X	2

Sheet D	1	2	3	4	5	6	7	8	Final
Spain (Otaegi / Unanue)	0	0	0	1	0	1	0	X	2
Sweden (Westman / Ahlberg) 🔨	3	3	1	0	1	0	3	X	11

Sheet E	1	2	3	4	5	6	7	8	Final
Turkey (Yıldız / Çakır) 🔨	0	2	0	1	1	2	1	1	8
England (Opel / Opel)	1	0	1	0	0	0	0	0	2

=== Draw 11 ===
Tuesday, April 25, 2:00 pm

Sheet A	1	2	3	4	5	6	7	8	Final
Estonia (Kaldvee / Lill)	2	0	0	1	1	0	1	1	6
Scotland (Dodds / Mouat) 🔨	0	2	1	0	0	2	0	0	5

Sheet B	1	2	3	4	5	6	7	8	Final
Australia (Gill / Hewitt) 🔨	2	1	0	1	0	2	0	4	10
South Korea (Kim / Jeong)	0	0	1	0	4	0	2	0	7

Sheet C	1	2	3	4	5	6	7	8	Final
Italy (Constantini / Arman) 🔨	1	0	3	0	2	2	0	X	8
Netherlands (Tonoli / Gösgens)	0	1	0	2	0	0	3	X	6

Sheet D	1	2	3	4	5	6	7	8	Final
Czech Republic (Zelingrová / Chabičovský)	0	1	0	1	0	1	X	X	3
Canada (Jones / Laing) 🔨	2	0	3	0	3	0	X	X	8

Sheet E	1	2	3	4	5	6	7	8	9	Final
Denmark (Lander / Holtermann) 🔨	0	1	0	0	1	1	0	2	0	5
Hungary (Joó / Tatár)	1	0	1	1	0	0	2	0	1	6

=== Draw 12 ===
Tuesday, April 25, 6:00 pm

Sheet A	1	2	3	4	5	6	7	8	Final
United States (Thiesse / Dropkin) 🔨	1	3	2	1	0	0	X	X	7
England (Opel / Opel)	0	0	0	0	1	1	X	X	2

Sheet B	1	2	3	4	5	6	7	8	Final
Norway (Rønning / Brænden) 🔨	0	4	0	3	0	0	1	0	8
Japan (Matsumura / Tanida)	1	0	3	0	2	1	0	3	10

Sheet C	1	2	3	4	5	6	7	8	Final
Turkey (Yıldız / Çakır)	2	0	0	4	3	0	1	X	10
Spain (Otaegi / Unanue) 🔨	0	1	1	0	0	2	0	X	4

Sheet D	1	2	3	4	5	6	7	8	Final
Austria (Augustin / Reichel) 🔨	0	1	1	0	1	0	2	X	5
Switzerland (Schwaller-Hürlimann / Schwaller)	1	0	0	4	0	2	0	X	7

Sheet E	1	2	3	4	5	6	7	8	Final
Sweden (Westman / Ahlberg)	0	1	0	2	1	0	0	X	4
Germany (Schöll / Harsch) 🔨	2	0	2	0	0	3	2	X	9

=== Draw 13 ===
Wednesday, April 26, 10:00 am

Sheet A	1	2	3	4	5	6	7	8	Final
Netherlands (Tonoli / Gösgens)	2	1	0	0	0	1	0	1	5
Czech Republic (Zelingrová / Chabičovský) 🔨	0	0	2	1	3	0	1	0	7

Sheet B	1	2	3	4	5	6	7	8	Final
Denmark (Lander / Holtermann) 🔨	0	1	0	0	1	0	0	X	2
Canada (Jones / Laing)	1	0	1	1	0	2	3	X	8

Sheet C	1	2	3	4	5	6	7	8	Final
Scotland (Dodds / Mouat)	2	0	2	0	3	0	0	0	7
Hungary (Joó / Tatár) 🔨	0	1	0	2	0	1	1	1	6

Sheet D	1	2	3	4	5	6	7	8	Final
Estonia (Kaldvee / Lill) 🔨	5	0	3	0	1	0	X	X	9
Australia (Gill / Hewitt)	0	1	0	1	0	1	X	X	3

Sheet E	1	2	3	4	5	6	7	8	Final
South Korea (Kim / Jeong)	0	0	0	1	0	1	1	0	3
Italy (Constantini / Arman) 🔨	1	1	2	0	1	0	0	1	6

=== Draw 14 ===
Wednesday, April 26, 2:00 pm

Sheet A	1	2	3	4	5	6	7	8	Final
Spain (Otaegi / Unanue) 🔨	2	1	0	0	0	3	1	0	7
Austria (Augustin / Reichel)	0	0	2	1	1	0	0	1	5

Sheet B	1	2	3	4	5	6	7	8	Final
Sweden (Westman / Ahlberg) 🔨	1	0	1	0	0	2	0	0	4
Switzerland (Schwaller-Hürlimann / Schwaller)	0	1	0	1	1	0	3	2	8

Sheet C	1	2	3	4	5	6	7	8	Final
England (Opel / Opel) 🔨	0	0	1	0	1	1	0	X	3
Germany (Schöll / Harsch)	1	2	0	3	0	0	2	X	8

Sheet D	1	2	3	4	5	6	7	8	Final
United States (Thiesse / Dropkin) 🔨	1	1	1	1	0	0	1	0	5
Norway (Rønning / Brænden)	0	0	0	0	1	1	0	1	3

Sheet E	1	2	3	4	5	6	7	8	Final
Japan (Matsumura / Tanida) 🔨	0	3	0	1	1	0	1	1	7
Turkey (Yıldız / Çakır)	1	0	2	0	0	1	0	0	4

=== Draw 15 ===
Wednesday, April 26, 6:00 pm

Sheet A	1	2	3	4	5	6	7	8	9	Final
Hungary (Joó / Tatár)	0	3	0	1	0	0	3	0	0	7
Canada (Jones / Laing) 🔨	2	0	1	0	1	1	0	2	1	8

Sheet B	1	2	3	4	5	6	7	8	Final
Italy (Constantini / Arman) 🔨	1	1	1	0	1	0	2	0	6
Estonia (Kaldvee / Lill)	0	0	0	2	0	3	0	2	7

Sheet C	1	2	3	4	5	6	7	8	Final
Czech Republic (Zelingrová / Chabičovský)	0	2	1	0	1	0	1	0	5
Denmark (Lander / Holtermann) 🔨	1	0	0	3	0	1	0	1	6

Sheet D	1	2	3	4	5	6	7	8	Final
South Korea (Kim / Jeong) 🔨	2	0	0	1	0	0	1	0	4
Netherlands (Tonoli / Gösgens)	0	3	2	0	1	1	0	1	8

Sheet E	1	2	3	4	5	6	7	8	Final
Scotland (Dodds / Mouat) 🔨	4	0	1	0	2	0	1	0	8
Australia (Gill / Hewitt)	0	2	0	1	0	2	0	1	6

=== Draw 16 ===
Thursday, April 27, 10:00 am

Sheet A	1	2	3	4	5	6	7	8	Final
Germany (Schöll / Harsch)	0	2	0	2	0	2	0	1	7
Switzerland (Schwaller-Hürlimann / Schwaller) 🔨	1	0	3	0	2	0	2	0	8

Sheet B	1	2	3	4	5	6	7	8	Final
Turkey (Yıldız / Çakır)	0	0	0	2	0	3	0	2	7
United States (Thiesse / Dropkin) 🔨	1	2	1	0	1	0	3	0	8

Sheet C	1	2	3	4	5	6	7	8	Final
Austria (Augustin / Reichel)	0	0	1	0	1	0	X	X	2
Sweden (Westman / Ahlberg) 🔨	2	3	0	3	0	2	X	X	10

Sheet D	1	2	3	4	5	6	7	8	Final
Japan (Matsumura / Tanida)	2	0	0	2	0	3	0	X	7
Spain (Otaegi / Unanue) 🔨	0	1	1	0	1	0	2	X	5

Sheet E	1	2	3	4	5	6	7	8	Final
England (Opel / Opel)	1	0	0	0	0	1	X	X	2
Norway (Rønning / Brænden) 🔨	0	2	2	3	2	0	X	X	9

=== Draw 17 ===
Thursday, April 27, 2:00 pm

Sheet A	1	2	3	4	5	6	7	8	Final
Italy (Constantini / Arman) 🔨	5	0	1	0	2	0	1	0	9
Denmark (Lander / Holtermann)	0	4	0	2	0	2	0	3	11

Sheet B	1	2	3	4	5	6	7	8	Final
Czech Republic (Zelingrová / Chabičovský)	0	0	1	0	2	1	1	0	5
Scotland (Dodds / Mouat) 🔨	1	3	0	1	0	0	0	1	6

Sheet C	1	2	3	4	5	6	7	8	Final
Netherlands (Tonoli / Gösgens)	0	2	0	0	4	2	0	X	8
Estonia (Kaldvee / Lill) 🔨	1	0	1	1	0	0	3	X	6

Sheet D	1	2	3	4	5	6	7	8	Final
Australia (Gill / Hewitt)	0	1	0	3	0	2	0	1	7
Hungary (Joó / Tatár) 🔨	1	0	2	0	1	0	1	0	5

Sheet E	1	2	3	4	5	6	7	8	Final
Canada (Jones / Laing) 🔨	2	1	0	3	0	0	1	0	7
South Korea (Kim / Jeong)	0	0	2	0	1	1	0	2	6

=== Draw 18 ===
Thursday, April 27, 6:00 pm

Sheet A	1	2	3	4	5	6	7	8	Final
Turkey (Yıldız / Çakır) 🔨	1	2	0	0	3	0	2	0	8
Sweden (Westman / Ahlberg)	0	0	2	1	0	2	0	4	9

Sheet B	1	2	3	4	5	6	7	8	Final
Austria (Augustin / Reichel)	1	1	0	5	0	1	X	X	8
England (Opel / Opel) 🔨	0	0	1	0	1	0	X	X	2

Sheet C	1	2	3	4	5	6	7	8	9	Final
Spain (Otaegi / Unanue) 🔨	3	0	1	0	2	0	2	0	1	9
United States (Thiesse / Dropkin)	0	2	0	4	0	1	0	1	0	8

Sheet D	1	2	3	4	5	6	7	8	Final
Norway (Rønning / Brænden) 🔨	1	0	0	1	3	0	1	X	6
Germany (Schöll / Harsch)	0	1	1	0	0	2	0	X	4

Sheet E	1	2	3	4	5	6	7	8	Final
Switzerland (Schwaller-Hürlimann / Schwaller)	1	1	3	2	0	2	X	X	9
Japan (Matsumura / Tanida) 🔨	0	0	0	0	1	0	X	X	1

== Relegation playoff ==
Friday, April 28, 10:00 am

Sheet A	1	2	3	4	5	6	7	8	Final
Czech Republic (Zelingrová / Chabičovský)	0	0	1	1	1	1	0	1	5
Germany (Schöll / Harsch) 🔨	1	1	0	0	0	0	1	0	3

Player percentages
Czech Republic		Germany	
Julie Zelingrová	89%	Pia-Lisa Schöll	62%
Vít Chabičovský	78%	Klaudius Harsch	74%
Total	82%	Total	69%

Sheet E	1	2	3	4	5	6	7	8	Final
Austria (Augustin / Reichel) 🔨	0	2	1	0	1	0	2	0	6
South Korea (Kim / Jeong)	2	0	0	3	0	2	0	1	8

Player percentages
Austria		South Korea	
Hannah Augustin	83%	Kim Ji-yoon	63%
Martin Reichel	78%	Jeong Byeong-jin	82%
Total	80%	Total	74%

== Playoffs ==
Qualification games
B2	United States	8
A3	Scotland	6
A2	Estonia	5
B3	Norway	8

Semifinals
A1	Canada	2
B2	United States	6
B1	Japan	5
B3	Norway	4

Final
B2	United States	8
B1	Japan	2
Bronze medal game
A1	Canada	2
B3	Norway	6

=== Qualification Games ===
Friday, April 28, 10:00 am

Sheet B	1	2	3	4	5	6	7	8	Final
Estonia (Kaldvee / Lill) 🔨	1	0	1	0	0	2	0	1	5
Norway (Rønning / Brænden)	0	1	0	3	1	0	3	0	8

Player percentages
Estonia		Norway	
Marie Kaldvee	77%	Martine Rønning	75%
Harri Lill	63%	Mathias Brænden	81%
Total	68%	Total	79%

Sheet D	1	2	3	4	5	6	7	8	Final
United States (Thiesse / Dropkin) 🔨	2	0	4	0	0	2	0	X	8
Scotland (Dodds / Mouat)	0	1	0	2	1	0	2	X	6

Player percentages
United States		Scotland	
Cory Thiesse	83%	Jennifer Dodds	86%
Korey Dropkin	94%	Bruce Mouat	90%
Total	90%	Total	88%

=== Semifinals ===
Friday, April 28, 6:00 pm

Sheet B	1	2	3	4	5	6	7	8	Final
Canada (Jones / Laing) 🔨	0	1	0	1	0	0	0	X	2
United States (Thiesse / Dropkin)	1	0	1	0	1	1	2	X	6

Player percentages
Canada		United States	
Jennifer Jones	64%	Cory Thiesse	93%
Brent Laing	88%	Korey Dropkin	91%
Total	79%	Total	92%

Sheet D	1	2	3	4	5	6	7	8	Final
Japan (Matsumura / Tanida) 🔨	1	0	1	0	1	0	1	1	5
Norway (Rønning / Brænden)	0	1	0	1	0	2	0	0	4

Player percentages
Japan		Norway	
Chiaki Matsumura	78%	Martine Rønning	69%
Yasumasa Tanida	80%	Mathias Brænden	89%
Total	79%	Total	81%

=== Bronze medal game ===
Saturday, April 29, 10:00 am

Sheet C	1	2	3	4	5	6	7	8	Final
Canada (Jones / Laing) 🔨	0	1	0	0	0	1	0	0	2
Norway (Rønning / Brænden)	1	0	1	1	1	0	1	1	6

Player percentages
Canada		Norway	
Jennifer Jones	67%	Martine Rønning	89%
Brent Laing	65%	Mathias Brænden	86%
Total	66%	Total	86%

=== Final ===
Saturday, April 29, 2:00 pm

Sheet C	1	2	3	4	5	6	7	8	Final
United States (Thiesse / Dropkin)	1	2	0	2	1	0	2	X	8
Japan (Matsumura / Tanida) 🔨	0	0	1	0	0	1	0	X	2

Player percentages
United States		Japan	
Cory Thiesse	82%	Chiaki Matsumura	45%
Korey Dropkin	89%	Yasumasa Tanida	71%
Total	86%	Total	61%

== Statistics ==
=== Player percentages ===
Final Round Robin Percentages

Key
All-Star Team

Female	%
(Scotland) Jennifer Dodds	79.5
(Estonia) Marie Kaldvee	78.8
(United States) Cory Thiesse	78.0
(Italy) Stefania Constantini	76.7
(Canada) Jennifer Jones	76.5
(Switzerland) Briar Schwaller-Hürlimann	75.4
(Norway) Martine Rønning	75.0
(Sweden) Therese Westman	73.5
(Germany) Pia-Lisa Schöll	73.4
(Australia) Tahli Gill	73.0
(Turkey) Dilşat Yıldız	72.8
(South Korea) Kim Ji-yoon	72.4
(Japan) Chiaki Matsumura	71.5
(Denmark) Jasmin Lander	70.4
(Czech Republic) Julie Zelingrová	70.3
(Netherlands) Vanessa Tonoli	70.1
(Hungary) Linda Joó	67.5
(Austria) Hannah Augustin	62.8
(Spain) Oihane Otaegi	62.0
(England) Lina Opel	46.4

Male	%
(United States) Korey Dropkin	84.0
(Scotland) Bruce Mouat	81.6
(Switzerland) Yannick Schwaller	81.4
(Sweden) Robin Ahlberg	80.7
(Australia) Dean Hewitt	79.9
(Japan) Yasumasa Tanida	79.2
(Canada) Brent Laing	79.0
(Estonia) Harri Lill	78.2
(Italy) Sebastiano Arman	78.1
(Turkey) Bilal Ömer Çakır	77.0
(Norway) Mathias Brænden	76.6
(Netherlands) Wouter Gösgens	74.9
(South Korea) Jeong Byeong-jin	74.9
(Denmark) Henrik Holtermann	74.7
(Germany) Klaudius Harsch	72.7
(Czech Republic) Vít Chabičovský	72.1
(Hungary) Lőrinc Tatár	71.7
(Spain) Mikel Unanue	70.8
(Austria) Martin Reichel	68.6
(England) Michael Opel	58.9

== Final standings ==
Key
Teams relegated to 2023 World Mixed Doubles Qualification Event

Place	Team
1st place, gold medalist(s)	United States
2nd place, silver medalist(s)	Japan
3rd place, bronze medalist(s)	Norway
4	Canada
5	Estonia
5	Scotland
7	Switzerland
8	Australia
9	Denmark
10	Sweden
11	Italy
12	Turkey
13	Spain
14	Netherlands
15	Czech Republic
16	South Korea
17	Austria
18	Germany
19	Hungary
20	England
