= 2023 World Mixed Curling Championship =

- Host city: Aberdeen, Scotland
- Arena: Curl Aberdeen
- Dates: 14–21 October
- Winner: Sweden
- Curling club: Sundbybergs CK, Sundbyberg
- Skip: Johan Nygren
- Third: Jennie Wåhlin
- Second: Fredrik Carlsén
- Lead: Fanny Sjöberg
- Coach: Per Carlsén
- Finalist: Spain (Vez)

The 2023 World Mixed Curling Championship was held from 14 to 21 October in Aberdeen, Scotland.

== Teams ==
The teams are listed as follows:

Australia	Austria	Belgium	Brazil	Canada
Skip: Matt Panoussi; Third: Jennifer Westhagen; Second: Gerald Chick; Lead: Beata Bowes	Fourth: Teresa Treichl; Third: Martin Seiwald; Second: Emma Müller; Skip: Gernot Higatzberger	Skip: Timothy Verreycken; Third: Mirte Michiels; Second: Jeroen Spruyt; Lead: Caro Van Oosterwyck	Skip: Sérgio Mitsuo Vilela; Third: Fernanda Tiema Mugiuda Marqués; Second: Felipe Augusto Ribeiro Pires; Lead: Fabiana Cristina De Souza Campos	Skip: Félix Asselin; Third: Laurie St-Georges; Second: Émile Asselin; Lead: Emily Riley
Chinese Taipei	Czech Republic	England	Estonia	Finland
Fourth: Ken Hsu; Skip: Yang Ko; Second: Henry Cheng; Lead: Stephanie Lee	Skip: Miloš Hoferka; Third: Pavlína Čížková; Second: Danila Liamaev; Lead: Zuzana Hálová	Fourth: Ben Fowler; Skip: Anna Fowler; Second: Scott Gibson; Lead: Annabelle Martin	Skip: Karl Kukner; Third: Kaidi Elmik; Second: Marten Padama; Lead: Karoliine Kaare	Skip: Iikko Säntti; Third: Susanna Säntti; Second: Arto Laine; Lead: Virpi Säntti
Germany	Hong Kong	Hungary	India	Ireland
Skip: Felix Schulze; Third: Josephine Obermann; Second: Sven Goldemann; Lead: Constanze Ocker	Skip: Jason Chang; Third: Ling-Yue Hung; Second: Michael Wai Ko Lam; Lead: Ada Shang	Fourth: Balázs Fóti; Third: Csilla Halász; Skip: Gabor Ezsöl; Lead: Enikõ Szabó	Skip: P.N. Raju; Third: Namini Chaudhari; Second: Girithar Anthay Suthakaran; Lead: Richa Patel	Skip: Brian Mathews; Third: Clare McCormick; Second: Jason Medhurst; Lead: Stephanie McDonald
Israel	Italy	Japan	Latvia	Lithuania
Skip: Alex Pokras; Third: Elana Sone; Second: Aaron Horowitz; Lead: Helen Pokras	Fourth: Alberto Pimpini; Skip: Barbara Gentile; Second: Stefano Perucca; Lead: Arianna Losano	Skip: Kawano Kantaro; Third: Urataki Natsumi; Second: Kasai Yutaro; Lead: Yamaguchi Yuka	Skip: Arnis Veidemanis; Third: Evelīna Barone; Second: Roberts Reinis Buncis; Lead: Daina Barone	Skip: Paulius Rymeikis; Third: Mintautė Jurkutė; Second: Donatas Kiudys; Lead: Migle Kiudyte
Netherlands	New Zealand	Nigeria	Norway	Poland
Skip: Bart Klomp; Third: Nikki Willems; Second: Gerben Putter; Lead: Dagmar Diender	Skip: Dave Watt; Third: Courtney Smith; Second: William Sheard; Lead: Mhairi-Bronté Duncan	Skip: Harold Woods III; Third: Jasmin Hashi; Second: T.J. Cole; Lead: Susana Cole	Fourth: Steffen Walstad; Skip: Maia Ramsfjell; Second: Andreas Hårstad; Lead: Eirin Mesloe	Skip: Andrzej Augustyniak; Third: Adela Walczak; Second: Pawel Hertman; Lead: Karolina Startek
Scotland	Slovakia	Slovenia	Spain	Sweden
Skip: Jack Strawhorn; Third: Amy Mitchell; Second: Kaleb Johnston; Lead: Kirsty Gallacher	Fourth: Jakub Polák; Skip: Daniela Matulová; Second: Robert Masaryk; Lead: Martina Ščepková	Skip: Štefan Sever; Third: Nina Kremzar; Second: Marko Harb; Lead: Patricija Cerne	Skip: Sergio Vez; Third: Oihane Otaegi; Second: Mikel Unanue; Lead: Leire Otaegi	Skip: Johan Nygren; Third: Jennie Wåhlin; Second: Fredrik Carlsén; Lead: Fanny Sjöberg
Switzerland	Ukraine	United States	Wales	
Fourth: Yves Hess; Skip: Ursi Hegner; Second: Simon Hoehn; Lead: Claudia Baumann	Skip: Eduard Nikolov; Third: Yaroslava Kalinichenko; Second: Yaroslav Shchur; Lead: Anastasiia Kotova	Skip: Jed Brundidge; Third: Isabella Hagenbuch; Second: Cameron Rittenour; Lead: Mae Hagenbuch	Skip: Adrian Meikle; Third: Dawn Watson; Second: Andrew Tanner; Lead: Judith Glazier	

== Round-robin standings ==
Final Round Robin Standings

Key
Teams to Playoffs

Group A	Skip	W	L	W–L	DSC
Sweden	Johan Nygren	8	0	–	45.94
Japan	Kawano Kantaro	6	2	1–0	57.79
Belgium	Timothy Verreycken	6	2	0–1	38.93
England	Anna Fowler	5	3	–	60.67
Ireland	Brian Mathews	4	4	–	94.46
Scotland	Jack Strawhorn	3	5	–	55.87
Israel	Alex Pokras	2	6	–	94.58
Netherlands	Bart Klomp	1	7	1–0	58.50
Wales	Adrian Meikle	1	7	0–1	61.56

Group B	Skip	W	L	W–L	DSC
Canada	Félix Asselin	8	0	–	76.01
Chinese Taipei	Yang Ko	5	3	–	89.55
Australia	Matt Panoussi	4	4	2–1	79.65
Slovenia	Štefan Sever	4	4	2–1	108.96
Hungary	Gabor Ezsöl	4	4	1–2	61.32
Poland	Andrzej Augustyniak	4	4	1–2	69.81
New Zealand	Dave Watt	3	5	–	64.47
Lithuania	Paulius Rymeikis	2	6	1–0	77.64
Finland	Iikko Säntti	2	6	0–1	84.68

Group C	Skip	W	L	W–L	DSC
Spain	Sergio Vez	7	0	–	46.54
United States	Jed Brundidge	5	2	1–0	38.16
Italy	Barbara Gentile	5	2	0–1	43.73
Germany	Felix Schulze	4	3	–	41.20
Austria	Gernot Higatzberger	3	4	–	76.38
India	P.N. Raju	2	5	1–0	104.42
Estonia	Karl Kukner	2	5	0–1	57.86
Brazil	Sérgio Mitsuo Vilela	0	7	–	130.63

Group D	Skip	W	L	W–L	DSC
Norway	Maia Ramsfjell	7	0	–	75.20
Latvia	Arnis Veidemanis	6	1	–	55.95
Switzerland	Ursi Hegner	5	2	–	51.93
Ukraine	Eduard Nikolov	3	4	1–0	76.46
Slovakia	Daniela Matulová	3	4	0–1	84.71
Czech Republic	Miloš Hoferka	2	5	–	95.89
Nigeria	Harold Woods III	1	6	1–0	135.30
Hong Kong	Jason Chang	1	6	0–1	91.18

Group A Round Robin Summary Table
Pos.	Country	Belgium	England		Israel	Japan	Netherlands	Scotland	Sweden	Wales	Record
3	Belgium	—	6–3	10–1	7–6	4–5	14–4	6–3	3–7	8–3	6–2
4	England	3–6	—	8–2	6–5	4–7	9–4	8–3	3–7	7–3	5–3
5	Ireland	1–10	2–8	—	10–7	8–6	10–1	3–7	3–6	15–1	4–4
7	Israel	6–7	5–6	7–10	—	6–7	9–2	7–4	2–7	5–8	2–6
2	Japan	5–4	7–4	6–8	7–6	—	8–3	8–7	5–8	7–5	6–2
8	Netherlands	4–14	4–9	1–10	2–9	3–8	—	1–8	4–9	5–3	1–7
6	Scotland	3–6	3–8	7–3	4–7	7–8	8–1	—	3–8	11–0	3–5
1	Sweden	7–3	7–3	6–3	7–2	8–5	9–4	8–3	—	7–2	8–0
9	Wales	3–8	3–7	1–15	8–5	5–7	3–5	0–11	2–7	—	1–7

Group B Round Robin Summary Table
Pos.	Country	Australia	Canada	Chinese Taipei	Finland	Hungary	Lithuania	New Zealand	Poland	Slovenia	Record
3	Australia	—	2–7	4–6	9–4	5–7	6–4	5–7	5–3	7–3	4–4
1	Canada	7–2	—	8–3	10–1	12–6	9–5	6–3	6–3	7–5	8–0
2	Chinese Taipei	6–4	3–8	—	9–2	5–9	9–4	5–4	4–10	8–2	5–3
9	Finland	4–9	1–10	2–9	—	6–7	7–10	11–7	10–2	5–6	2–6
5	Hungary	7–5	6–12	9–5	7–6	—	8–4	4–5	2–6	2–8	4–4
8	Lithuania	4–6	5–9	4–9	10–7	4–8	—	7–6	2–7	2–4	2–6
7	New Zealand	7–5	3–6	4–5	7–11	5–4	6–7	—	5–10	14–4	3–5
6	Poland	3–5	3–6	10–4	2–10	6–2	7–2	10–5	—	3–7	4–4
4	Slovenia	3–7	5–7	2–8	6–5	8–2	4–2	4–14	7–3	—	4–4

Group C Round Robin Summary Table
Pos.	Country	Austria	Brazil	Estonia	Germany	India	Italy	Spain	United States	Record
5	Austria	—	6–5	5–8	3–12	9–2	3–6	4–9	6–4	3–4
8	Brazil	5–6	—	2–10	3–10	3–9	L–W	1–8	2–8	0–7
7	Estonia	8–5	10–2	—	6–7	4–6	4–7	3–11	6–8	2–5
4	Germany	12–3	10–3	7–6	—	7–2	2–5	4–5	4–5	4–3
6	India	2–9	9–3	6–4	2–7	—	3–8	3–14	2–9	2–5
3	Italy	6–3	W–L	7–4	5–2	8–3	—	2–10	4–8	5–2
1	Spain	9–4	8–1	11–3	5–4	13–4	10–2	—	7–1	7–0
2	United States	4–6	8–2	8–6	5–4	9–2	8–4	1–7	—	5–2

Group D Round Robin Summary Table
Pos.	Country	Czech Republic	Hong Kong	Latvia	Nigeria	Norway	Slovakia	Switzerland	Ukraine	Record
6	Czech Republic	—	4–5	4–9	10–5	1–7	4–5	3–10	8–5	2–5
8	Hong Kong	5–4	—	3–11	4–7	2–7	4–13	2–8	1–6	1–6
2	Latvia	9–4	11–3	—	12–1	3–6	9–1	7–5	10–4	6–1
7	Nigeria	5–10	7–4	1–12	—	1–17	3–7	1–10	3–10	1–6
1	Norway	7–1	7–2	6–3	17–1	—	9–2	8–2	12–3	7–0
5	Slovakia	5–4	13–4	1–9	7–3	2–9	—	2–7	6–9	3–4
3	Switzerland	10–3	8–2	5–7	10–1	2–8	7–2	—	6–2	5–2
4	Ukraine	5–8	6–1	4–10	10–3	3–12	9–6	2–6	—	3–4

== Round-robin results ==
=== Draw 1 ===
Saturday, October 14, 8:00

Sheet A	1	2	3	4	5	6	7	8	Final
Italy (Gentile) 🔨	0	3	1	0	0	3	0	X	7
Estonia (Kukner)	0	0	0	2	1	0	1	X	4

Sheet C	1	2	3	4	5	6	7	8	Final
England (Fowler) 🔨	0	2	3	1	0	1	0	X	7
Wales (Meikle)	1	0	0	0	1	0	1	X	3

Sheet E	1	2	3	4	5	6	7	8	Final
Brazil (Vilela) 🔨	0	1	0	0	0	0	X	X	1
Spain (Vez)	1	0	3	1	1	2	X	X	8

Sheet B	1	2	3	4	5	6	7	8	Final
Ireland (Mathews) 🔨	0	1	2	2	0	1	0	4	10
Israel (Pokras)	4	0	0	0	2	0	1	0	7

Sheet D	1	2	3	4	5	6	7	8	Final
Belgium (Verreycken) 🔨	0	3	0	1	0	0	2	X	6
Scotland (Strawhorn)	1	0	0	0	1	1	0	X	3

Sheet F	1	2	3	4	5	6	7	8	Final
Sweden (Nygren) 🔨	4	0	0	3	0	0	2	X	9
Netherlands (Klomp)	0	1	1	0	1	1	0	X	4

=== Draw 2 ===
Saturday, October 14, 12:00

Sheet A	1	2	3	4	5	6	7	8	Final
Canada (Asselin) 🔨	3	0	2	4	1	0	X	X	10
Finland (Säntti)	0	0	0	0	0	1	X	X	1

Sheet D	1	2	3	4	5	6	7	8	Final
Switzerland (Hegner) 🔨	2	0	0	4	0	3	1	X	10
Czech Republic (Hoferka)	0	1	1	0	1	0	0	X	3

Sheet F	1	2	3	4	5	6	7	8	Final
Norway (Ramsfjell)	1	0	1	1	0	3	0	X	6
Latvia (Veidemanis) 🔨	0	1	0	0	1	0	1	X	3

Sheet B	1	2	3	4	5	6	7	8	Final
Ukraine (Nikolov)	0	0	1	0	3	1	2	2	9
Slovakia (Matulová) 🔨	1	1	0	4	0	0	0	0	6

Sheet E	1	2	3	4	5	6	7	8	Final
Poland (Augustyniak)	1	0	0	0	1	1	0	X	3
Slovenia (Sever) 🔨	0	2	2	2	0	0	1	X	7

=== Draw 3 ===
Saturday, October 14, 16:00

Sheet A	1	2	3	4	5	6	7	8	Final
Sweden (Nygren) 🔨	2	0	4	0	1	0	0	1	8
Japan (Kawano)	0	1	0	2	0	2	0	0	5

Sheet D	1	2	3	4	5	6	7	8	Final
Germany (Schulze) 🔨	0	3	3	1	0	3	0	X	10
Brazil (Vilela)	1	0	0	0	1	0	1	X	3

Sheet F	1	2	3	4	5	6	7	8	Final
Italy (Gentile)	0	1	0	1	0	2	0	0	4
United States (Brundidge) 🔨	1	0	1	0	1	0	1	4	8

Sheet C	1	2	3	4	5	6	7	8	Final
Austria (Higatzberger)	1	0	1	0	1	0	1	X	4
Spain (Vez) 🔨	0	3	0	5	0	1	0	X	9

Sheet E	1	2	3	4	5	6	7	8	Final
Scotland (Strawhorn) 🔨	2	1	4	3	0	1	X	X	11
Wales (Meikle)	0	0	0	0	0	0	X	X	0

=== Draw 4 ===
Saturday, October 14, 20:30

Sheet A	1	2	3	4	5	6	7	8	Final
Norway (Ramsfjell) 🔨	6	0	3	2	2	1	3	X	17
Nigeria (Woods III)	0	1	0	0	0	0	0	X	1

Sheet C	1	2	3	4	5	6	7	8	Final
Lithuania (Rymeikis) 🔨	0	0	0	0	1	0	1	X	2
Slovenia (Sever)	1	1	0	1	0	1	0	X	4

Sheet F	1	2	3	4	5	6	7	8	Final
Canada (Asselin)	1	2	0	0	3	0	2	X	8
Chinese Taipei (Yang) 🔨	0	0	2	0	0	1	0	X	3

Sheet B	1	2	3	4	5	6	7	8	Final
New Zealand (Watt) 🔨	4	0	0	1	0	0	0	2	7
Australia (Panoussi)	0	1	2	0	0	2	0	0	5

Sheet D	1	2	3	4	5	6	7	8	Final
Hungary (Ezsöl)	0	0	1	0	0	1	X	X	2
Poland (Augustyniak) 🔨	0	2	0	3	1	0	X	X	6

=== Draw 5 ===
Sunday, October 15, 8:00

Sheet A	1	2	3	4	5	6	7	8	Final
Wales (Meikle)	0	1	0	1	0	1	0	X	3
Belgium (Verreycken) 🔨	1	0	1	0	3	0	3	X	8

Sheet C	1	2	3	4	5	6	7	8	9	Final
Japan (Kawano) 🔨	2	1	0	0	1	0	2	0	1	7
Israel (Pokras)	0	0	0	2	0	2	0	2	0	6

Sheet F	1	2	3	4	5	6	7	8	Final
Brazil (Vilela)	0	0	0	1	1	0	1	2	5
Austria (Higatzberger) 🔨	2	0	1	0	0	3	0	0	6

Sheet B	1	2	3	4	5	6	7	8	Final
Estonia (Kukner) 🔨	0	0	0	3	0	2	0	1	6
United States (Brundidge)	2	0	0	0	3	0	3	0	8

Sheet E	1	2	3	4	5	6	7	8	Final
India (Raju) 🔨	0	1	0	1	0	0	0	X	2
Germany (Schulze)	2	0	2	0	1	1	1	X	7

=== Draw 6 ===
Sunday, October 15, 12:00

Sheet B	1	2	3	4	5	6	7	8	Final
Finland (Säntti)	0	1	0	0	1	0	X	X	2
Chinese Taipei (Yang) 🔨	4	0	1	2	0	2	X	X	9

Sheet D	1	2	3	4	5	6	7	8	Final
Australia (Panoussi)	0	1	0	1	0	0	0	X	2
Canada (Asselin) 🔨	2	0	1	0	2	0	2	X	7

Sheet F	1	2	3	4	5	6	7	8	Final
Poland (Augustyniak) 🔨	1	3	0	0	1	2	0	X	7
Lithuania (Rymeikis)	0	0	0	1	0	0	1	X	2

Sheet C	1	2	3	4	5	6	7	8	Final
Nigeria (Woods III)	0	0	1	1	1	0	0	X	3
Slovakia (Matulová) 🔨	2	1	0	0	0	3	1	X	7

Sheet E	1	2	3	4	5	6	7	8	Final
New Zealand (Watt)	1	0	0	2	0	1	0	1	5
Hungary (Ezsöl) 🔨	0	1	1	0	1	0	1	0	4

=== Draw 7 ===
Sunday, October 15, 16:00

Sheet A	1	2	3	4	5	6	7	8	Final
Spain (Vez)	2	0	0	1	0	1	0	1	5
Germany (Schulze) 🔨	0	2	0	0	1	0	1	0	4

Sheet D	1	2	3	4	5	6	7	8	Final
Israel (Pokras)	0	0	1	0	0	1	X	X	2
Sweden (Nygren) 🔨	2	1	0	3	1	0	X	X	7

Sheet F	1	2	3	4	5	6	7	8	Final
Scotland (Strawhorn)	0	0	0	1	0	2	0	0	3
England (Fowler) 🔨	0	0	3	0	1	0	1	3	8

Sheet B	1	2	3	4	5	6	7	8	Final
Japan (Kawano)	0	3	1	0	3	0	1	X	8
Netherlands (Klomp) 🔨	1	0	0	1	0	1	0	X	3

Sheet E	1	2	3	4	5	6	7	8	Final
Ireland (Mathews)	0	0	0	0	0	1	X	X	1
Belgium (Verreycken) 🔨	2	3	1	3	1	0	X	X	10

=== Draw 8 ===
Sunday, October 15, 20:00

Sheet A	1	2	3	4	5	6	7	8	Final
Slovenia (Sever)	1	3	0	2	1	0	1	X	8
Hungary (Ezsöl) 🔨	0	0	1	0	0	1	0	X	2

Sheet C	1	2	3	4	5	6	7	8	Final
Finland (Säntti) 🔨	0	1	0	0	3	0	0	X	4
Australia (Panoussi)	2	0	1	0	0	1	5	X	9

Sheet E	1	2	3	4	5	6	7	8	Final
Ukraine (Nikolov)	0	1	0	0	1	0	X	X	2
Switzerland (Hegner) 🔨	2	0	1	3	0	0	X	X	6

Sheet B	1	2	3	4	5	6	7	8	Final
Nigeria (Woods III)	0	0	0	0	1	0	X	X	1
Latvia (Veidemanis) 🔨	5	1	1	2	0	3	X	X	12

Sheet D	1	2	3	4	5	6	7	8	Final
Slovakia (Matulová)	0	2	0	0	0	0	X	X	2
Norway (Ramsfjell) 🔨	3	0	1	2	3	0	X	X	9

Sheet F	1	2	3	4	5	6	7	8	9	Final
Czech Republic (Hoferka)	0	0	0	1	0	1	1	1	0	4
Hong Kong (Chang) 🔨	0	2	1	0	1	0	0	0	1	5

=== Draw 9 ===
Monday, October 16, 8:00

Sheet A	1	2	3	4	5	6	7	8	Final
Japan (Kawano) 🔨	2	0	1	0	4	0	0	1	8
Scotland (Strawhorn)	0	1	0	1	0	2	3	0	7

Sheet C	1	2	3	4	5	6	7	8	Final
United States (Brundidge) 🔨	0	2	1	3	0	3	X	X	9
India (Raju)	1	0	0	0	1	0	X	X	2

Sheet E	1	2	3	4	5	6	7	8	Final
Israel (Pokras) 🔨	3	1	0	1	2	2	X	X	9
Netherlands (Klomp)	0	0	2	0	0	0	X	X	2

Sheet B	1	2	3	4	5	6	7	8	Final
Sweden (Nygren) 🔨	0	1	0	2	0	0	3	1	7
England (Fowler)	0	0	1	0	0	2	0	0	3

Sheet D	1	2	3	4	5	6	7	8	Final
Ireland (Mathews) 🔨	3	2	4	5	0	1	X	X	15
Wales (Meikle)	0	0	0	0	1	0	X	X	1

Sheet F	1	2	3	4	5	6	7	8	Final
Austria (Higatzberger)	0	0	1	0	2	0	X	X	3
Germany (Schulze) 🔨	3	1	0	4	0	4	X	X	12

=== Draw 10 ===
Monday, October 16, 12:00

Sheet A	1	2	3	4	5	6	7	8	Final
Finland (Säntti)	2	3	2	1	0	2	X	X	10
Poland (Augustyniak) 🔨	0	0	0	0	2	0	X	X	2

Sheet C	1	2	3	4	5	6	7	8	Final
Latvia (Veidemanis) 🔨	0	4	1	0	5	0	X	X	10
Ukraine (Nikolov)	2	0	0	1	0	1	X	X	4

Sheet E	1	2	3	4	5	6	7	8	Final
Australia (Panoussi)	0	1	1	1	0	0	1	X	4
Chinese Taipei (Yang) 🔨	1	0	0	0	4	1	0	X	6

Sheet B	1	2	3	4	5	6	7	8	Final
Canada (Asselin)	2	0	4	0	2	1	0	X	9
Lithuania (Rymeikis) 🔨	0	3	0	1	0	0	1	X	5

Sheet D	1	2	3	4	5	6	7	8	Final
New Zealand (Watt) 🔨	4	0	5	4	0	1	X	X	14
Slovenia (Sever)	0	1	0	0	3	0	X	X	4

Sheet F	1	2	3	4	5	6	7	8	Final
Hong Kong (Chang)	0	1	0	0	1	0	X	X	2
Switzerland (Hegner) 🔨	2	0	2	3	0	1	X	X	8

=== Draw 11 ===
Monday, October 16, 16:00

Sheet A	1	2	3	4	5	6	7	8	Final
Estonia (Kukner) 🔨	3	0	4	3	0	0	X	X	10
Brazil (Vilela)	0	1	0	0	0	1	X	X	2

Sheet C	1	2	3	4	5	6	7	8	Final
Netherlands (Klomp)	1	0	0	0	0	0	X	X	1
Ireland (Mathews) 🔨	0	2	1	3	1	3	X	X	10

Sheet F	1	2	3	4	5	6	7	8	Final
England (Fowler) 🔨	0	0	3	0	0	0	0	X	3
Belgium (Verreycken)	0	2	0	2	0	1	1	X	6

Sheet B	1	2	3	4	5	6	7	8	Final
Italy (Gentile) 🔨	0	2	0	1	0	2	0	1	6
Austria (Higatzberger)	0	0	1	0	1	0	1	0	3

Sheet D	1	2	3	4	5	6	7	8	Final
India (Raju)	0	1	0	2	0	1	X	X	4
Spain (Vez) 🔨	4	0	5	0	4	0	X	X	13

=== Draw 12 ===
Monday, October 16, 20:00

Sheet A	1	2	3	4	5	6	7	8	Final
Nigeria (Woods III) 🔨	0	0	3	1	1	0	0	X	5
Czech Republic (Horfeka)	3	1	0	0	0	3	3	X	10

Sheet C	1	2	3	4	5	6	7	8	Final
Chinese Taipei (Yang)	0	0	0	3	1	0	0	1	5
New Zealand (Watt) 🔨	1	0	0	0	0	2	1	0	4

Sheet F	1	2	3	4	5	6	7	8	Final
Lithuania (Rymeikis)	0	2	0	1	0	0	1	0	4
Hungary (Ezsöl) 🔨	2	0	1	0	1	1	0	3	8

Sheet B	1	2	3	4	5	6	7	8	Final
Norway (Ramsfjell) 🔨	2	2	1	0	2	0	X	X	7
Hong Kong (Chang)	0	0	0	1	0	1	X	X	2

Sheet E	1	2	3	4	5	6	7	8	Final
Slovakia (Matulová)	0	0	0	1	0	0	X	X	1
Latvia (Veidemanis) 🔨	2	1	2	0	1	3	X	X	9

=== Draw 13 ===
Tuesday, October 17, 8:00

Sheet A	1	2	3	4	5	6	7	8	Final
Ukraine (Nikolov)	0	0	1	0	2	0	X	X	3
Norway (Ramsfjell) 🔨	0	3	0	6	0	3	X	X	12

Sheet C	1	2	3	4	5	6	7	8	Final
Slovakia (Matulová) 🔨	2	0	1	0	3	4	3	X	13
Hong Kong (Chang)	0	3	0	1	0	0	0	X	4

Sheet E	1	2	3	4	5	6	7	8	Final
Canada (Asselin)	1	0	2	0	2	0	1	X	6
Poland (Augustyniak) 🔨	0	1	0	1	0	1	0	X	3

Sheet B	1	2	3	4	5	6	7	8	Final
Switzerland (Hegner) 🔨	3	2	1	0	1	1	2	X	10
Nigeria (Woods III)	0	0	0	1	0	0	0	X	1

Sheet D	1	2	3	4	5	6	7	8	Final
Lithuania (Rymeikis)	0	2	0	1	0	0	4	0	7
New Zealand (Watt) 🔨	1	0	1	0	2	0	0	2	6

=== Draw 14 ===
Tuesday, October 17, 12:00

Sheet A	1	2	3	4	5	6	7	8	Final
Ireland (Mathews) 🔨	1	0	0	1	0	0	1	0	3
Sweden (Nygren)	0	2	1	0	2	0	0	1	6

Sheet C	1	2	3	4	5	6	7	8	Final
Israel (Porkas) 🔨	0	2	1	0	0	0	2	0	5
England (Fowler)	0	0	0	1	1	2	0	2	6

Sheet E	Final
Italy (Gentile) 🔨	W
Brazil (Vilela)	L

Sheet B	1	2	3	4	5	6	7	8	9	Final
Belgium (Verreycken)	0	0	0	1	0	0	2	1	0	4
Japan (Kawano) 🔨	0	0	1	0	3	0	0	0	1	5

Sheet D	1	2	3	4	5	6	7	8	Final
Austria (Higatzberger)	0	2	0	3	1	3	X	X	9
India (Raju) 🔨	0	0	2	0	0	0	X	X	2

Sheet F	1	2	3	4	5	6	7	8	Final
Netherlands (Klomp)	1	1	0	0	1	1	0	1	5
Wales (Meikle) 🔨	0	0	1	1	0	0	1	0	3

=== Draw 15 ===
Tuesday, October 17, 16:00

Sheet A	1	2	3	4	5	6	7	8	Final
New Zealand (Watt) 🔨	1	0	1	0	0	1	0	X	3
Canada (Asselin)	0	4	0	2	0	0	0	X	6

Sheet C	1	2	3	4	5	6	7	8	Final
Australia (Panoussi) 🔨	2	0	2	0	0	2	0	X	6
Lithuania (Rymeikis)	0	1	0	0	1	0	2	X	4

Sheet E	1	2	3	4	5	6	7	8	Final
Norway (Ramsfjell)	2	2	0	2	1	0	X	X	7
Czech Republic (Horfeka) 🔨	0	0	1	0	0	0	X	X	1

Sheet B	1	2	3	4	5	6	7	8	9	Final
Hungary (Ezsöl) 🔨	0	2	0	1	2	0	0	1	1	7
Finland (Säntti)	1	0	3	0	0	1	1	0	0	6

Sheet D	1	2	3	4	5	6	7	8	Final
Hong Kong (Chang)	0	0	0	0	1	0	0	X	1
Ukraine (Nikolov) 🔨	1	1	1	0	0	1	2	X	6

Sheet F	1	2	3	4	5	6	7	8	Final
Chinese Taipei (Yang) 🔨	0	1	0	0	2	2	3	X	8
Slovenia (Sever)	0	0	0	2	0	0	0	X	2

=== Draw 16 ===
Tuesday, October 17, 20:00

Sheet A	1	2	3	4	5	6	7	8	Final
India (Raju)	1	1	0	0	0	1	0	X	3
Italy (Gentile) 🔨	0	0	1	2	1	0	4	X	8

Sheet D	1	2	3	4	5	6	7	8	Final
England (Fowler) 🔨	3	1	2	0	1	1	X	X	8
Ireland (Mathews)	0	0	0	2	0	0	X	X	2

Sheet F	1	2	3	4	5	6	7	8	Final
United States (Brundidge) 🔨	1	0	0	0	0	0	X	X	1
Spain (Vez)	0	2	0	1	1	3	X	X	7

Sheet B	1	2	3	4	5	6	7	8	Final
Germany (Schulze) 🔨	2	0	0	1	3	0	0	1	7
Estonia (Kukner)	0	2	1	0	0	1	2	0	6

Sheet E	1	2	3	4	5	6	7	8	Final
Sweden (Nygren) 🔨	1	0	1	2	2	0	2	X	8
Scotland (Strawhorn)	0	2	0	0	0	1	0	X	3

=== Draw 17 ===
Wednesday, October 18, 8:00

Sheet A	1	2	3	4	5	6	7	8	Final
Switzerland (Hegner) 🔨	1	0	1	2	0	3	X	X	7
Slovakia (Matulová)	0	1	0	0	1	0	X	X	2

Sheet D	1	2	3	4	5	6	7	8	Final
Chinese Taipei (Yang) 🔨	2	0	1	0	2	0	0	X	5
Hungary (Ezsöl)	0	2	0	4	0	1	2	X	9

Sheet F	1	2	3	4	5	6	7	8	Final
Nigeria (Woods III)	0	0	0	2	0	0	1	X	3
Ukraine (Nikolov) 🔨	0	4	1	0	3	2	0	X	10

Sheet C	1	2	3	4	5	6	7	8	Final
Czech Republic (Horfeka)	0	2	0	0	2	0	0	X	4
Latvia (Veidemanis) 🔨	2	0	4	1	0	0	2	X	9

Sheet E	1	2	3	4	5	6	7	8	9	Final
Lithuania (Rymeikis) 🔨	3	0	0	1	0	3	0	0	3	10
Finland (Säntti)	0	0	1	0	3	0	2	1	0	7

=== Draw 18 ===
Wednesday, October 18, 12:00

Sheet B	1	2	3	4	5	6	7	8	Final
Spain (Vez) 🔨	0	1	0	3	3	3	X	X	10
Italy (Gentile)	1	0	1	0	0	0	X	X	2

Sheet D	1	2	3	4	5	6	7	8	Final
Netherlands (Klomp)	1	0	1	0	2	0	X	X	4
Belgium (Verrycken) 🔨	0	4	0	7	0	3	X	X	14

Sheet F	1	2	3	4	5	6	7	8	Final
Estonia (Kukner) 🔨	0	0	1	0	1	1	1	0	4
India (Raju)	0	1	0	3	0	0	0	2	6

Sheet C	1	2	3	4	5	6	7	8	Final
Brazil (Vilela)	0	0	1	1	0	0	X	X	2
United States (Brundidge) 🔨	2	1	0	0	4	1	X	X	8

Sheet E	1	2	3	4	5	6	7	8	Final
England (Fowler)	0	1	0	0	0	2	1	X	4
Japan (Kawano) 🔨	2	0	0	1	4	0	0	X	7

=== Draw 19 ===
Wednesday, October 18, 16:00

Sheet A	1	2	3	4	5	6	7	8	Final
Hungary (Ezsöl)	1	0	2	0	0	2	0	2	7
Australia (Panoussi) 🔨	0	0	0	3	0	0	2	0	5

Sheet C	1	2	3	4	5	6	7	8	Final
Poland (Augustyniak)	2	1	0	0	6	1	X	X	10
Chinese Taipei (Yang) 🔨	0	0	2	2	0	0	X	X	4

Sheet E	1	2	3	4	5	6	7	8	Final
Hong Kong (Chang) 🔨	0	1	3	0	0	0	0	X	4
Nigeria (Woods III)	3	0	0	1	1	1	1	X	7

Sheet B	1	2	3	4	5	6	7	8	Final
Slovenia (Sever) 🔨	1	0	2	0	2	0	0	X	5
Canada (Asselin)	0	2	0	2	0	1	2	X	7

Sheet D	1	2	3	4	5	6	7	8	Final
Latvia (Veidemanis)	0	0	4	0	0	2	0	1	7
Switzerland (Hegner) 🔨	0	1	0	1	1	0	2	0	5

Sheet F	1	2	3	4	5	6	7	8	Final
Finland (Säntti)	0	2	0	4	0	3	2	X	11
New Zealand (Watt) 🔨	2	0	3	0	2	0	0	X	7

=== Draw 20 ===
Wednesday, October 18, 20:00

Sheet A	1	2	3	4	5	6	7	8	9	Final
Belgium (Verrycken) 🔨	1	0	0	1	1	0	3	0	1	7
Israel (Pokras)	0	1	1	0	0	2	0	2	0	6

Sheet C	1	2	3	4	5	6	7	8	Final
Scotland (Strawhorn)	2	2	2	0	1	1	X	X	8
Netherlands (Klomp) 🔨	0	0	0	1	0	0	X	X	1

Sheet E	1	2	3	4	5	6	7	8	Final
Austria (Higatzberger)	0	0	0	0	2	2	1	X	5
Estonia (Kukner) 🔨	3	2	3	0	0	0	0	X	8

Sheet B	1	2	3	4	5	6	7	8	Final
Wales (Meikle) 🔨	0	1	0	1	0	0	0	X	2
Sweden (Nygern)	1	0	3	0	1	0	2	X	7

Sheet D	1	2	3	4	5	6	7	8	9	Final
United States (Brundidge) 🔨	1	0	1	1	0	0	1	0	1	5
Germany (Schulze)	0	0	0	0	1	1	0	2	0	4

Sheet F	1	2	3	4	5	6	7	8	Final
Japan (Kawano) 🔨	1	0	4	0	0	1	0	0	6
Ireland (Mathews)	0	3	0	1	1	0	2	1	8

=== Draw 21 ===
Thursday, October 19, 8:00

Sheet A	1	2	3	4	5	6	7	8	Final
Chinese Taipei (Yang) 🔨	0	2	0	2	0	2	0	3	9
Lithuania (Rymeikis)	0	0	1	0	1	0	2	0	4

Sheet C	1	2	3	4	5	6	7	8	Final
Hungary (Ezsöl)	0	3	1	0	1	1	0	X	6
Canada (Asselin) 🔨	3	0	0	4	0	0	5	X	12

Sheet F	1	2	3	4	5	6	7	8	Final
Australia (Panoussi)	0	1	0	0	1	0	3	0	5
Poland (Augustyniak) 🔨	0	0	1	0	0	1	0	1	3

Sheet B	1	2	3	4	5	6	7	8	Final
Czech Republic (Hoferka) 🔨	2	0	0	2	0	4	0	X	8
Ukraine (Nikolov)	0	1	1	0	1	0	2	X	5

Sheet D	1	2	3	4	5	6	7	8	Final
Slovenia (Sever) 🔨	3	2	0	1	0	0	0	0	6
Finland (Säntti)	0	0	2	0	1	0	1	1	5

=== Draw 22 ===
Thursday, October 19, 12:00

Sheet A	1	2	3	4	5	6	7	8	Final
United States (Brundidge)	0	2	1	0	1	0	0	0	4
Austria (Higatzberger) 🔨	1	0	0	1	0	2	1	1	6

Sheet C	1	2	3	4	5	6	7	8	Final
Germany (Schulze)	0	0	0	1	0	1	0	X	2
Italy (Gentile) 🔨	0	0	1	0	1	0	3	X	5

Sheet E	1	2	3	4	5	6	7	8	Final
Wales (Meikle)	0	1	0	1	0	2	3	1	8
Israel (Pokras) 🔨	1	0	1	0	3	0	0	0	5

Sheet B	1	2	3	4	5	6	7	8	Final
Scotland (Strawhorn)	1	0	1	1	1	0	3	X	7
Ireland (Mathews) 🔨	0	2	0	0	0	1	0	X	3

Sheet D	1	2	3	4	5	6	7	8	Final
Spain (Vez) 🔨	3	1	0	0	3	1	3	X	11
Estonia (Kukner)	0	0	1	2	0	0	0	X	3

=== Draw 23 ===
Thursday, October 19, 16:00

Sheet A	1	2	3	4	5	6	7	8	Final
Netherlands (Klomp)	0	1	0	0	0	3	0	X	4
England (Fowler) 🔨	3	0	2	2	1	0	1	X	9

Sheet C	1	2	3	4	5	6	7	8	Final
Switzerland (Hegner)	0	0	1	0	0	1	0	X	2
Norway (Ramsfjell) 🔨	0	1	0	2	1	0	4	X	8

Sheet F	1	2	3	4	5	6	7	8	9	Final
Slovakia (Matulová) 🔨	0	2	0	0	0	1	1	0	1	5
Czech Republic (Hoferka)	0	0	2	0	0	0	0	2	0	4

Sheet B	1	2	3	4	5	6	7	8	Final
Poland (Augustyniak)	3	3	0	0	2	0	2	X	10
New Zealand (Watt) 🔨	0	0	3	1	0	1	0	X	5

Sheet E	1	2	3	4	5	6	7	8	Final
Slovenia (Sever)	0	3	0	0	0	0	0	X	3
Australia (Panoussi) 🔨	1	0	3	0	1	1	1	X	7

=== Draw 24 ===
Thursday, October 19, 20:00

Sheet A	1	2	3	4	5	6	7	8	Final
Latvia (Veidemanis) 🔨	0	3	0	5	2	1	X	X	11
Hong Kong (Chang)	1	0	2	0	0	0	X	X	3

Sheet C	1	2	3	4	5	6	7	8	Final
Belgium (Verreycken)	0	0	0	1	0	2	0	X	3
Sweden (Nygren) 🔨	1	2	0	0	2	0	2	X	7

Sheet F	1	2	3	4	5	6	7	8	Final
Israel (Pokras)	0	0	0	1	0	2	0	4	7
Scotland (Strawhorn) 🔨	1	1	1	0	0	0	1	0	4

Sheet B	1	2	3	4	5	6	7	8	Final
Brazil (Vilela)	0	0	1	2	0	0	0	X	3
India (Raju) 🔨	1	0	0	0	4	2	2	X	9

Sheet D	1	2	3	4	5	6	7	8	Final
Wales (Meikle)	1	0	1	0	1	0	2	X	5
Japan (Kawano) 🔨	0	0	0	5	0	2	0	X	7

== Playoffs ==
Qualification games
8	Chinese Taipei	4
9	Belgium	6
5	United States	7
12	Australia	8
6	Latvia	6
11	Switzerland	3
7	Japan	5
10	Italy	4

Quarterfinals
1	Sweden	7
9	Belgium	2
4	Canada	7
12	Australia	3
3	Norway	8
6	Latvia	5
2	Spain	6
7	Japan	4

Semifinals
1	Sweden	7
4	Canada	4
3	Norway	3
2	Spain	4

Gold medal game
1	Sweden	8
2	Spain	2
Bronze medal game
4	Canada	4
3	Norway	3

=== Qualification games ===
Friday, October 20, 10:00

Sheet A	1	2	3	4	5	6	7	8	Final
Chinese Taipei (Yang)	1	0	1	0	2	0	0	X	4
Belgium (Verreycken) 🔨	0	2	0	2	0	1	1	X	6

Sheet B	1	2	3	4	5	6	7	8	9	Final
United States (Brundidge)	0	1	0	2	4	0	0	0	0	7
Australia (Panoussi) 🔨	1	0	2	0	0	2	1	1	1	8

Sheet E	1	2	3	4	5	6	7	8	Final
Latvia (Veidemanis)	0	1	0	2	0	2	1	X	6
Switzerland (Hegner) 🔨	2	0	1	0	0	0	0	X	3

Sheet F	1	2	3	4	5	6	7	8	Final
Japan (Kawano)	0	1	1	0	0	2	0	1	5
Italy (Gentile) 🔨	1	0	0	1	0	0	2	0	4

=== Quarterfinals ===
Friday, October 20, 18:00

Sheet A	1	2	3	4	5	6	7	8	Final
Norway (Ramsfjell) 🔨	1	0	1	0	2	1	0	3	8
Latvia (Veidemanis)	0	2	0	1	0	0	2	0	5

Sheet B	1	2	3	4	5	6	7	8	Final
Sweden (Nygren) 🔨	2	0	1	1	0	3	X	X	7
Belgium (Verreycken)	0	1	0	0	1	0	X	X	2

Sheet E	1	2	3	4	5	6	7	8	Final
Spain (Vez)	0	0	3	0	2	0	0	1	6
Japan (Kawano) 🔨	0	1	0	1	0	1	1	0	4

Sheet F	1	2	3	4	5	6	7	8	Final
Canada (Asselin) 🔨	2	1	2	0	2	0	0	X	7
Australia (Panoussi)	0	0	0	1	0	0	2	X	3

=== Semifinals ===
Saturday, October 21, 9:30

Sheet E	1	2	3	4	5	6	7	8	Final
Sweden (Nygren) 🔨	1	0	2	1	0	2	1	X	7
Canada (Asselin)	0	1	0	0	3	0	0	X	4

Sheet B	1	2	3	4	5	6	7	8	Final
Norway (Ramsfjell)	0	0	1	0	1	0	0	1	3
Spain (Vez) 🔨	0	2	0	0	0	1	1	0	4

=== Bronze medal game ===
Saturday, October 21, 14:30

Sheet D	1	2	3	4	5	6	7	8	Final
Canada (Asselin) 🔨	0	0	0	1	0	0	2	1	4
Norway (Ramsfjell)	0	0	1	0	1	1	0	0	3

=== Gold medal game ===
Saturday, October 21, 14:30

Sheet C	1	2	3	4	5	6	7	8	Final
Sweden (Nygren)	0	1	1	0	3	3	X	X	8
Spain (Vez) 🔨	1	0	0	1	0	0	X	X	2

== Final standings ==
Place	Team
1st place, gold medalist(s)	Sweden
2nd place, silver medalist(s)	Spain
3rd place, bronze medalist(s)	Canada
4	Norway
5	Australia
5	Belgium
5	Japan
5	Latvia
9	Chinese Taipei
9	Italy
9	Switzerland
9	United States

Place	Team
13	Germany
14	England
15	Ukraine
16	Slovenia
17	Poland
18	Austria
19	Slovakia
20	Ireland
21	Scotland
22	Hungary
23	Czech Republic
24	India

Place	Team
25	Estonia
26	New Zealand
27	Israel
28	Nigeria
29	Netherlands
30	Lithuania
31	Hong Kong
32	Brazil
33	Wales
34	Finland
