= Klaudius Harsch =

German curler (born 2001)

- Curler
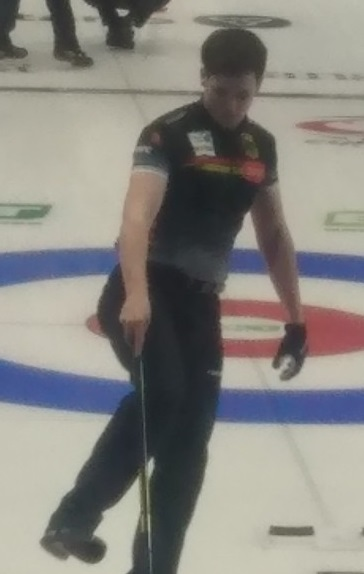
- Born: 23 January 2001 (age 25); Baden-Baden, Germany

Team
- Curling club: Baden Hills G&CC, Füssen, GER
- Mixed doubles partner: Emira Abbes

Curling career
- Member Association: Germany
- World Championship: 2 (2021, 2023)
- World Mixed Doubles Championship: 3 (2021, 2022, 2023)
- European Championship: 1 (2022)
Medal record
Representing Germany
Curling
World Mixed Doubles Championship
Bronze medal – third place	2022 Geneva
World University Games
Silver medal – second place	2025 Turin	Mixed doubles
World Junior Championships
Silver medal – second place	2022 Jönköping

Klaudius Harsch (born 23 January 2001) is a German curler from Kempten, Germany.

== Career ==
=== Juniors ===
Harsch made his first appearance at the World Junior-B Curling Championships in 2018. There, his team of Sixten Totzek, Joshua Sutor, Jan-Luca Häg and Till Wunderlich won the bronze medal game, sending them to the 2018 World Junior Curling Championships. At the championship, the team just missed the playoffs with a 4–5 record after losing their final round robin draw to Canada's Tyler Tardi. Their fifth-place finish earned the team a spot at the 2019 World Junior Curling Championships without having to qualify through the B Championship. They did not have a good performance at the 2019 championship, finishing with a 3–6 round robin record and being relegated to the B Championship for the following season. They would, however, qualify again through the 2019 World Junior-B Curling Championships in December 2019 to secure a spot at the 2020 World Junior Curling Championships. There, Harsch and his German rink would have their best finish to date, qualifying for the playoffs for the first time with a 6–3 record. They then lost to Canada's Jacques Gauthier in the semifinal 7–4 and Scotland's James Craik in the bronze medal game 6–5, settling for fourth place. Harsch returned as an alternate for the Benjamin Kapp team at the 2022 World Junior Curling Championships, where the German rink would win the silver medal, after losing again to Scotland's Craik 7–1 in the final.

=== Mens ===
For the 2020–21 season, Harsch began skipping his own team. He competed in his first World Men's Curling Championship that season as alternate for the German National Team skipped by former junior teammate Sixten Totzek. The team finished in tenth place with a 4–9 record. Harsch would then join the Totzek team as their third, competing at the 2022 European Curling Championships, where they would finish the round robin with a 3–6 record, but would qualify them for the 2023 World Men's Curling Championship. At the World's, the team again finished with a losing record of 4–8, failing to qualify for the playoffs. At the end of the season, Harsch left the Totzek rink to focus on his university studies.

=== Mixed Doubles ===
Harsch plays mixed doubles curling with his partner Pia-Lisa Schöll. The duo represented Germany at the 2019 World Mixed Doubles Qualification Event, finishing with a perfect 8–0 and qualifying for the 2020 World Mixed Doubles Curling Championship. They would not, however, get the chance to compete at the championship as it was cancelled due to the COVID-19 pandemic. The team would participate in the 2021 World Mixed Doubles Curling Championship, finishing the round robin with a 5–4 record, just missing out on the playoffs. Schöll and Harsch would also participate in the 2021 Olympic Qualification Event, where they finished with a 3–3 record, failing to qualify for the Olympics.

Schöll and Harsch would improve their performance at the 2022 World Mixed Doubles Curling Championship, going 6–3 in the round robin, and winning a bronze medal, beating Norway's Maia Ramsfjell and Magnus Ramsfjell in the bronze medal game. Schöll and Harsch would represent Germany again in the 2023 World Mixed Doubles Curling Championship, but would not be able to repeat their success, finishing round robin play with a disappointing 2–7 record.

While attending the Kempten University of Applied Sciences, Harsch returned to world-level curling in 2025 at the 2025 World University Games with teammate Kim Sutor, where they won the silver medal, losing to Great Britain's Robyn Munro and Orrin Carson 10–8 in the final.

== Personal life ==
Harsch is an industrial engineer student.

== Teams ==
Season	Skip	Third	Second	Lead	Alternate
2017–18	Sixten Totzek (Fourth)	Klaudius Harsch (Skip)	Joshua Sutor	Jan-Luca Häg	Till Wunderlich
2018–19	Sixten Totzek (Fourth)	Klaudius Harsch (Skip)	Joshua Sutor	Magnus Sutor	Jan-Luca Häg
2019–20	Sixten Totzek	Joshua Sutor	Jan-Luca Häg	Magnus Sutor	Klaudius Harsch
2020–21	Klaudius Harsch	Magnus Sutor	Jan-Luca Häg	Till Wunderlich	Kevin Bold
2020–21	Sixten Totzek	Marc Muskatewitz	Joshua Sutor	Dominik Greindl	Klaudius Harsch
2021–22	Benjamin Kapp	Felix Messenzehl	Johannes Scheuerl	Magnus Sutor	Klaudius Harsch
2022–23	Sixten Totzek	Klaudius Harsch	Magnus Sutor	Dominik Greindl	Marc Muskatewitz
