= Irantzu García =

Spanish curler (born 1992)

- Curler ♀
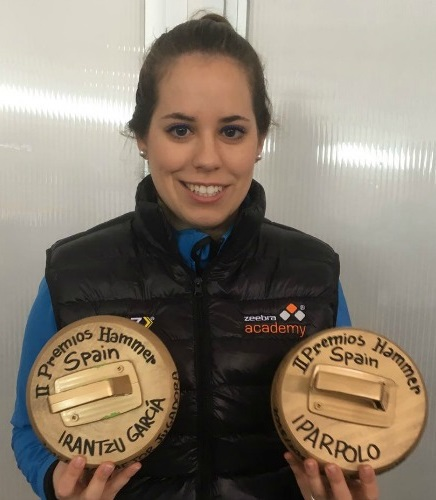
- Other names: Irantzu García Vez
- Born: 14 July 1992 (age 34); Amorebieta-Etxano, Basque Country, Spain

Team
- Curling club: Club Iparpolo, Vitoria-Gasteiz
- Skip: Irantzu García
- Third: María Gómez
- Second: María Fernández
- Lead: Ana Vázquez
- Alternate: Nerea Torralba
- Mixed doubles partner: Gontzal García

Curling career
- Member Association: Spain
- World Mixed Doubles Championship: 10 (2008, 2010, 2011, 2012, 2013, 2014, 2015, 2016, 2017, 2018)
- European Championship: 6 (2008, 2010, 2012, 2013, 2019, 2021)
- Other appearances: World Mixed Championship: 1 (2016), European Mixed Championship: 2 (2010, 2013), European Junior Challenge: 6 (2007, 2008, 2009, 2010, 2011, 2012)
Medal record
Curling
World Mixed Doubles Championship
Bronze medal – third place	2014 Dumfries

Irantzu García (born 14 July 1992 in Amorebieta-Etxano, Basque Country, Spain; also known as Irantzu García Vez) is a Spanish curler. She is a 2014 World mixed doubles bronze medallist.

== Teams ==
=== Women's ===
Season	Skip	Third	Second	Lead	Alternate	Coach	Events
2006–07	Irantzu García	Irene Santiago Calvillo	Elena Menéndez Fernández	Maria Fernández Picado	Mercedes Santiago Calvillo	Ellen Kittelsen	EJCC 2007 (8th)
2007–08	Irantzu García	Irene Santiago Calvillo	Ruth Mart¡nez	Elena Menéndez Fernández	Elena Altuna	Alison Brown	EJCC 2008 (6th)
2008–09	Irantzu García	Irene Santiago Calvillo	Elena Menéndez Fernández	Ruth Mart¡nez			EJCC 2009 (6th)
2008–09	Estrella Labrador Amo	Irantzu García	Sorkunde Vez Bilbao	Maria Fernández Picado	Elena Altuna	Alberto Vez	ECC 2008 (21st)
2009–10	Irantzu García	Irene Santiago Calvillo	Elena Altuna	Leire Peregrina Domene		Manuel Ruch	EJCC 2010 (6th)
2010–11	Irantzu García	Estrella Labrador Amo	Maria Fernández Picado	Elena Altuna	Iciar Ortiz de Urbina		ECC 2010 (16th)
2010–11	Irantzu García	Irene Santiago Calvillo	Elena Altuna	Iera Irazusta Manterola	Patricia Arbues Espinosa	Sorkunde Vez Bilbao	EJCC 2011 (5th)
2011–12	Irantzu García	Iera Irazusta Manterola	Irene Santiago Calvillo	Elena Altuna	Patricia Arbues Espinosa	Melanie Robillard	EJCC 2012 (7th)
2012–13	Irantzu García	Oihane Otaegi	Estrella Labrador Amo	Maria Fernández Picado	Iciar Ortiz de Urbina	Kristian Lindström	ECC 2012 (18th)
2013–14	Irantzu García	Oihane Otaegi	Estrella Labrador Amo	Maria Fernández Picado	Iciar Ortiz de Urbina		ECC 2013 (20th)
2014–15	Irantzu García	Maria Fernandez Picado	Sorkunde Vez Bilbao	Onditz Pereira Nart	Raquel Pascua Maestro		ECC 2015 (C group) (5th)
2017–18	Irantzu García	Alicia Munte	Maria Fernández Picado	Sorkunde Vez	Aurora Tesa		SWCC 2018 (bronze)
2019–20	Oihane Otaegi	Irantzu García	Leire Otaegi	Asun Manterola	Patricia Ruiz	Martin Stucki	ECC 2019 (17th)
2021–22	Irantzu García	María Gómez	María Fernández	Ana Vázquez		Gontzal García	ECC 2021 (19th)

=== Mixed ===
Season	Skip	Third	Second	Lead	Alternate	Coach	Events
2010–11	Irantzu García	Sergio Vez Labrador	Elena Altuna	Manuel García Roman	Egoitz Gordo Villamor		EMxCC 2010 (13th)
2013–14	Sergio Vez Labrador	Irantzu García	Alberto Vez	Estrella Labrador Amo			EMxCC 2013 (9th)
2016–17	Irantzu García	Gontzal García Vez	Maria Fernandez Picado	Manuel García Roman		Sorkunde Vez Bilbao	WMxCC 2016 (29th)

=== Mixed doubles ===
Season	Male	Female	Coach	Events
2007–08	Sergio Vez	Irantzu García	Alberto Vez	WMDCC 2008 (22nd)
2009–10	Sergio Vez	Irantzu García		WMDCC 2010 (4th)
2010–11	Sergio Vez	Irantzu García	Sorkunde Vez Bilbao	WMDCC 2011 (11th)
2011–12	Sergio Vez	Irantzu García	Alberto Vez	WMDCC 2012 (18th)
2012–13	Sergio Vez	Irantzu García		WMDCC 2013 (21st)
2013–14	Sergio Vez	Irantzu García	Ruaraidh Whyte	WMDCC 2014 (bronze)
2014–15	Gontzal García	Irantzu García	Sorkunde Vez Bilbao	WMDCC 2015 (17th)
2015–16	Gontzal García	Irantzu García	Kalynn Park	WMDCC 2016 (23rd)
2016–17	Gontzal Garcia	Irantzu Garcia	Brendan Bottcher	WMDCC 2017 (13th)
2017–18	Gontzal Garcia	Irantzu Garcia	Kristian Lindström	SMDCC 2018 (gold); WMDCC 2018 (22nd)

== Personal life ==
She is a doctor and is currently working in a hospital.

Her brother Gontzal García Vez is also a curler. He plays together with Irantzu in mixed or mixed doubles teams.
