= Mikel Unanue =

Spanish curler (born 1982)

- Curler
- Born: 24 October 1982 (age 44); San Sebastián, Basque Country, Spain

Team
- Curling club: Club Hielo Txuri-Berri, San Sebastián
- Skip: Sergio Vez
- Third: Mikel Unanue
- Second: Eduardo de Paz
- Lead: Nicholas Shaw
- Alternate: Luis Gómez
- Mixed doubles partner: Oihane Otaegi

Curling career
- Member Association: Spain
- World Mixed Doubles Championship: 6 (2019, 2021, 2022, 2023, 2024, 2025)
- World Mixed Championship: 5 (2015, 2017, 2018, 2019, 2024)
- European Championship: 7 (2013, 2015, 2017, 2018, 2019, 2022, 2026)
- Other appearances: European Mixed Championship: 1 (2012)
Medal record
Curling
World Mixed Championship
| Silver medal – second place | 2018 Kelowna |
| Silver medal – second place | 2023 Aberdeen |
European Championship B-Division
| Bronze medal – third place | 2024 Östersund |

Mikel Unanue (born 24 October 1982 in San Sebastián, Basque Country, Spain) is a Spanish curler.

At the international level, he is a 2018 and 2023 World mixed silver medallist.

== Teams ==
=== Men's ===
| Season | Skip | Third | Second | Lead | Alternate | Coach | Events |
|---|---|---|---|---|---|---|---|
| 2013–14 | Mikel Unanue | Sergio Vez | Inaki Lasuen | Victor Mirete | Avelino Garcia | Mike Harris | ECC 2013 (21st) |
| 2013–14 | Mikel Unanue | Inaki Lasuen | Victor Mirete | Avelino Garcia | Iban Arrunategi | | |
| 2014–15 | Mikel Unanue | Inaki Lasuen | Victor Mirete | Avelino Garcia | Iban Arrunategi | | |
| 2015–16 | Sergio Vez (fourth) | Mikel Unanue | Antonio De Mollinedo Gonzalez (skip) | Jose Manuel Sanguesa | Eduardo de Paz | Kenneth Hertsdahl | ECC 2015 (22nd) |
| 2017–18 | Sergio Vez | Mikel Unanue | Antonio De Mollinedo Gonzalez | Eduardo de Paz | Angel Garcia | Kenneth Hertsdahl | ECC 2017 (14th) |
| 2018–19 | Sergio Vez | Mikel Unanue | Antonio De Mollinedo | Eduardo de Paz | Angel Garcia | Kenneth Hertsdahl | ECC 2018 (18th) |
| 2019–20 | Sergio Vez | Mikel Unanue | Nicholas Shaw | Eduardo de Paz | Angel Garcia | Kenneth Hertsdahl | ECC 2019 (15th) |

=== Mixed ===
| Season | Skip | Third | Second | Lead | Events |
|---|---|---|---|---|---|
| 2012–13 | Oihane Otaegi | Mikel Unanue | Leire Otaegi | Inaki Lasuen | EMxCC 2012 (18th) |
| 2015–16 | Sergio Vez Labrador | Oihane Otaegi | Mikel Unanue | Leire Otaegi | WMxCC 2015 (24th) |
| 2017–18 | Sergio Vez Labrador | Oihane Otaegi | Mikel Unanue | Leire Otaegi | WMxCC 2017 (9th) |
| 2018–19 | Sergio Vez Labrador | Oihane Otaegi | Mikel Unanue | Leire Otaegi | WMxCC 2018 (silver) |
| 2019–20 | Sergio Vez Labrador | Oihane Otaegi | Mikel Unanue | Leire Otaegi | WMxCC 2019 (9th) |

=== Mixed doubles ===
| Season | Female | Male | Coach | Events |
|---|---|---|---|---|
| 2018–19 | Oihane Otaegi | Mikel Unanue | Steffen Walstad | WMDCC 2019 (9th) |
| 2020–21 | Oihane Otaegi | Mikel Unanue | Martin Stucki | WMDCC 2021 (20th) |
| 2021–22 | Oihane Otaegi | Mikel Unanue | | WMDCC 2022 (17th) |
| 2022–23 | Oihane Otaegi | Mikel Unanue | | WMDCC 2023 (13th) |
| 2023–24 | Oihane Otaegi | Mikel Unanue | Daniel Rafael | WMDCC 2024 (20th) |
| 2024–25 | Oihane Otaegi | Mikel Unanue | Daniel Rafael | WMDCC 2025 (20th) |
| 2025–26 | Oihane Otaegi | Mikel Unanue | Daniel Rafael | OQE 2025 (15th) |
