= Oihane Otaegi =

Spanish curler (born 1977)

- Curler ♀
- Other names: Oihane Otaegi Garmendia
- Born: 20 May 1977 (age 49); San Sebastián, Basque Country, Spain

Team
- Curling club: C.H. Txuri-Berri Curling, San Sebastián
- Mixed doubles partner: Mikel Unanue

Curling career
- Member Association: Spain
- World Mixed Doubles Championship: 6 (2019, 2021, 2022, 2023, 2024, 2025)
- World Mixed Championship: 7 (2015, 2017, 2018, 2019, 2022, 2023, 2024)
- European Championship: 6 (2011, 2012, 2013, 2017, 2018, 2019)
- Other appearances: European Mixed Championship: 1 (2012)
Medal record
Curling
World Mixed Championship
Silver medal – second place	2018 Kelowna
Silver medal – second place	2023 Aberdeen

Oihane Otaegi Garmendia (Note: In this Spanish name, the first or paternal surname is Otaegi and the second or maternal family name is Garmendia.) (born 20 May 1977 in San Sebastián, Basque Country, Spain) is a Spanish curler.

At the international level, she is a 2018 and 2023 World mixed silver medallist.

== Teams ==
=== Women's ===
Season	Skip	Third	Second	Lead	Alternate	Coach	Events
2011–12	Oihane Otaegi	Leire Otaegi	Aitana Saenz	Iera Irazusta Manterola	Asuncion Manterola	Melanie Robillard	ECC 2011 (18th)
2012–13	Irantzu Garcia	Oihane Otaegi	Estrella Labrador Amo	Maria Fernández Picado	Iciar Ortiz de Urbina	Kristian Lindström	ECC 2012 (18th)
2013–14	Irantzu Garcia	Oihane Otaegi	Estrella Labrador Amo	Maria Fernández Picado	Iciar Ortiz de Urbina		ECC 2013 (20th)
2013–14	Oihane Otaegi	Leire Otaegi	Aitana Saenz	Asuncion Manterola	Melanie Robillard	Antonio De Mollinedo Gonzalez	ECC 2014 (21st; 3rd in C group)
2015–16	Oihane Otaegi	Leire Otaegi	Aitana Saenz	Asuncion Manterola	Estrella Labrador Amo		ECC 2016 (22nd; 4th in C group)
2017–18	Oihane Otaegi	Leire Otaegi	Asuncion Manterola	Patricia Ruiz	Estrella Labrador Amo	Matthias Perret	ECC 2017 (16th)
2018–19	Oihane Otaegi	Leire Otaegi	Asun Manterola	Patricia Ruiz	Estrella Labrador		ECC 2018 (18th)
2019–20	Oihane Otaegi	Irantzu Garcia	Leire Otaegi	Asun Manterola	Patricia Ruiz	Martin Stucki	ECC 2019 (17th)
2025–26	Oihane Otaegi	Daniela García	Leire Otaegi	María Gómez	Patricia Ruiz	Mikel Unanue	WCC Pre-Q 2026 (TBD)

=== Mixed ===
Season	Skip	Third	Second	Lead	Events
2012–13	Oihane Otaegi	Mikel Unanue	Leire Otaegi	Inaki Lasuen	EMxCC 2012 (18th)
2015–16	Sergio Vez Labrador	Oihane Otaegi	Mikel Unanue	Leire Otaegi	WMxCC 2015 (24th)
2017–18	Sergio Vez Labrador	Oihane Otaegi	Mikel Unanue	Leire Otaegi	WMxCC 2017 (9th)
2018–19	Sergio Vez Labrador	Oihane Otaegi	Mikel Unanue	Leire Otaegi	WMxCC 2018 (silver)
2019–20	Sergio Vez Labrador	Oihane Otaegi	Mikel Unanue	Leire Otaegi	WMxCC 2019 (9th)

=== Mixed doubles ===
Season	Female	Male	Coach	Events
2018–19	Oihane Otaegi	Mikel Unanue	Steffen Walstad	WMDCC 2019 (9th)
2020–21	Oihane Otaegi	Mikel Unanue	Martin Stucki	WMDCC 2021 (20th)
2021–22	Oihane Otaegi	Mikel Unanue		WMDCC 2022 (17th)
2022–23	Oihane Otaegi	Mikel Unanue		WMDCC 2023 (13th)
2023–24	Oihane Otaegi	Mikel Unanue	Daniel Rafael	WMDCC 2024 (20th)
2024–25	Oihane Otaegi	Mikel Unanue	Daniel Rafael	WMDCC 2025 (20th)
2025–26	Oihane Otaegi	Mikel Unanue	Daniel Rafael	OQE 2025 (15th)

== Personal life ==
Her twin sister Leire Otaegi is also a curler. They are teammates.
