= Sergio Vez =

Spanish curler (born 1994)

- Curler
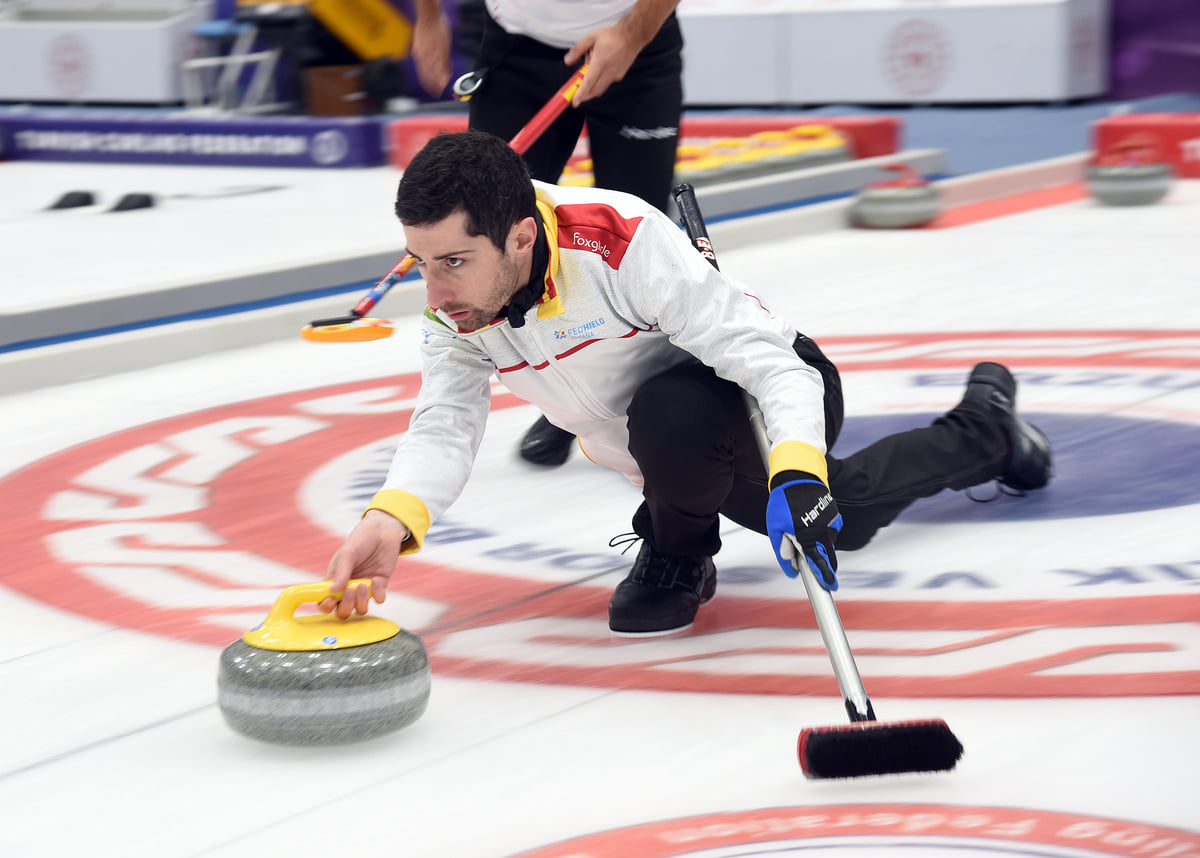
- Other names: Sergio Vez Labrador
- Born: 13 May 1994 (age 32); Basauri, Basque Country, Spain

Team
- Curling club: Club Hielo Txuri-Berri, San Sebastián
- Skip: Sergio Vez
- Third: Mikel Unanue
- Second: Eduardo de Paz
- Lead: Nicholas Shaw
- Alternate: Luis Gomez

Curling career
- Member Association: Spain
- World Mixed Doubles Championship: 6 (2008, 2010, 2011, 2012, 2013, 2014)
- World Mixed Championship: 7 (2015, 2017, 2018, 2019, 2022, 2023, 2024)
- European Championship: 12 (2010, 2012, 2013, 2015, 2017, 2018, 2019, 2021, 2022, 2024), 2025), 2026)
- Other appearances: Pre-Olympic Qualification Event: 1 (2021), World Qualification Event:1(2022), European Mixed Championship: 2 (2010, 2013), Winter Universiade: 1 (2015), European Junior Challenge: 7 (2007, 2008, 2009, 2010, 2011, 2012, 2015), European C-Division Championship:1(2017)
Medal record
Curling
World Mixed Championship
Silver medal – second place	2018 Kelowna
Silver medal – second place	2023 Aberdeen
World Mixed Doubles Championship
Bronze medal – third place	2014 Dumfries
Pre-Olympic Qualification Event
Silver medal – second place	2021 Erzurum
European Championship B-Division
Bronze medal – third place	2021 Lillehammer
Bronze medal – third place	2024 Östersund
Silver medal – second place	2025 Lahti
European Championship C-Division
Gold medal – first place	2017 Andorra
European Junior Challenge
Silver medal – second place	2015 Prague

Sergio Vez Labrador (born 13 May 1994 in Basauri, Basque Country, Spain) is a Spanish curler. He is a two time 2023 World mixed silver medallist and 2018 World mixed silver medallist and a 2014 World mixed doubles bronze medallist. During his career he has represented Spain in 297 international games. Since 2013 he has maintained his role as skip in all competitions.

== Teams ==
=== Mixed ===
Season	Skip	Third	Second	Lead	Alternate	Events
2010–11	Irantzu Garcia	Sergio Vez	Elena Altuna	Manuel García	Egoitz Gordo	EMxCC 2010 (13th)
2013–14	Sergio Vez	Irantzu Garcia	Alberto Vez	Estrella Labrador		EMxCC 2013 (9th)
2015–16	Sergio Vez	Oihane Otaegi	Mikel Unanue	Leire Otaegi		WMxCC 2015 (24th)
2017–18	Sergio Vez	Oihane Otaegi	Mikel Unanue	Leire Otaegi		WMxCC 2017 (9th)
2018–19	Sergio Vez	Oihane Otaegi	Mikel Unanue	Leire Otaegi		WMxCC 2018 (silver)
2019–20	Sergio Vez	Oihane Otaegi	Mikel Unanue	Leire Otaegi		WMxCC 2019 (9th)
2022-23	Sergio Vez	Oihane Otaegi	Mikel Unanue	Daniela Garcia		WMxCC 2022 (9th)
2023-24	Sergio Vez	Oihane Otaegi	Mikel Unanue	Leire Otaegi		WMxCC 2023 (silver)
2024-25	Sergio Vez	Oihane Otaegi	Mikel Unanue	Leire Otaegi		WMxCC 2024 (4th)

=== Mixed doubles ===
Season	Skip	Third	Coach	Events
2007–08	Sergio Vez	Irantzu Garcia	Alberto Vez	WMDCC 2008 (22nd)
2009–10	Sergio Vez	Irantzu Garcia		WMDCC 2010 (4th)
2010–11	Sergio Vez	Irantzu Garcia	Sorkunde Vez	WMDCC 2011 (11th)
2011–12	Sergio Vez	Irantzu Garcia	Alberto Vez	WMDCC 2012 (18th)
2012–13	Sergio Vez	Irantzu Garcia	Rebecca Atkinson	WMDCC 2013 (21st)
2013–14	Sergio Vez	Irantzu Garcia	Ruaraidh Whyte	WMDCC 2014 (bronze)

=== Junior ===
Season	Skip	Third	Second	Lead	Alternate	Coach	Events
2006–07	Carlos González	Iván Martínez	Sergio Vez	Pello Roldán de Aránguiz	Carlos Vega	Alberto Vez	EJCC 2007 (9th)
2007–08	Carlos González	Sergio Vez	Iván Martínez	Pello Roldán de Aránguiz	Carlos Vega	Alberto Vez	EJCC 2008 (5th)
2008–09	Carlos González	Sergio Vez	Iván Martínez	Pello Roldán de Aránguiz	Carlos Vega	Alberto Vez	EJCC 2009 (13th)
2009–10	Sergio Vez	Angel García	Adrián Manero	Eduardo de Paz		Manuel Ruch	EJCC 2010 (9th)
2010–11	Sergio Vez	Angel García	Adrián Manero	Eduardo de Paz	Egoitz Gordo	Sorkunde Vez	EJCC 2011 (8th)
2011–12	Sergio Vez	Angel García	Adrián Manero	Carlos Vega	Mario Fernández	Melanie Robillard	EJCC 2012 (7th)
2014–15	Sergio Vez	Mario Fernández	Eduardo de Paz	Luis Domingo	Gontzal García	Katja Kiiskinen	EJCC 2015 (silver)

=== University ===
Season	Skip	Third	Second	Lead	Alternate	Coach	Events
2014–15	Sergio Vez	Angel García	Eduardo de Paz	Luis Domingo	Mario Fernández	Katja Kiiskinen	WUG 2015 (10th)

=== Men's ===
Season	Skip	Third	Second	Lead	Alternate	Coach	Events
2010–11	Sergio Vez	Alberto Vez	Manuel García	Inigo Ruiz de Eguilaz	Egoitz Gordo		ECC-B 2010 (8th)
2012–13	Antonio De Mollinedo	Sergio Vez	Jose Manuel Sanguesa	Angel García	Carlos Vega		ECC-B 2012 (9th)
2013–14	Mikel Unanue	Sergio Vez	Iñaki Lasuen	Victor Mirete	Avelino García	Mike Harris	ECC-B 2013 (11th)
2015–16	Sergio Vez	Mikel Unanue	Antonio De Mollinedo	Jose Manuel Sanguesa	Eduardo de Paz	Kenneth Hertsdahl	ECC-B 2015 (12th)
2016–17	Sergio Vez	Mikel Unanue	Antonio De Mollinedo	Eduardo de Paz	Angel García	Kenneth Hertsdahl	ECC-C 2017 (gold)
2017–18	Sergio Vez	Mikel Unanue	Antonio De Mollinedo	Eduardo de Paz	Angel García	Kenneth Hertsdahl	ECC-B 2017 (4th)
2018–19	Sergio Vez	Mikel Unanue	Antonio De Mollinedo	Eduardo de Paz	Angel García	Kenneth Hertsdahl	ECC-B 2018 (8th)
2019–20	Sergio Vez	Mikel Unanue	Eduardo de Paz	Nicholas Shaw	Angel García	Kenneth Hertsdahl	ECC-B 2019 (5th)
2021–22	Sergio Vez	Mikel Unanue	Eduardo de Paz	Nicholas Shaw	Luis Gómez		POQE 2021 (bronze)
2021–22	Sergio Vez	Luis Gómez	Eduardo de Paz	Nicholas Shaw	Angel García		ECC-B 2021 (bronze)
2021–22	Sergio Vez	Mikel Unanue	Eduardo de Paz	Nicholas Shaw	Luis Gómez		WQE 2022 (6th)
2022–23	Sergio Vez	Mikel Unanue	Eduardo de Paz	Nicholas Shaw	Luis Gómez	David Wills	ECC-A 2022 (9th)
2024–25	Sergio Vez	Mikel Unanue	Eduardo de Paz	Nicholas Shaw		Daniel Rafael	ECC-B 2024 (bronze)
2025-26	Sergio Vez	Nicholas Shaw	Eduardo de Paz	Luis Gómez		Daniel Rafael	ECC-B 2025 (bronze)
2026-27	Sergio Vez	Mikel Unanue	Eduardo de Paz	Nicholas Shaw	Luis Gómez		ECC 2026 (silver)
