= 2022 World Mixed Doubles Curling Championship =

- Host city: Geneva, Switzerland
- Arena: Geneva Sous-Moulin Sports Center
- Dates: April 23–30, 2022
- Winner: Scotland
- Female: Eve Muirhead
- Male: Bobby Lammie
- Coach: Greg Drummond
- Finalist: Switzerland (Pätz / Michel)

The 2022 World Mixed Doubles Curling Championship was held from April 23 to 30, 2022 at the Curling Club Trois-Chêne in the Geneva Sous-Moulin Sports Center in Thônex, a suburb of Geneva, Switzerland. The event was held alongside the 2022 World Senior Curling Championships. Eve Muirhead and Bobby Lammie of Scotland went undefeated the entire event, beating home team Alina Pätz and Sven Michel of Switzerland 9-7 in the final to win the gold medal.

== Medallists ==
Team	Gold	Silver	Bronze
Mixed Doubles	Scotland; Eve Muirhead; Bobby Lammie	Switzerland; Alina Pätz; Sven Michel	Germany; Pia-Lisa Schöll; Klaudius Harsch

== Qualification ==
The following nations qualified to participate in the 2022 World Mixed Doubles Curling Championship:

Event	Vacancies	Qualified
2021 World Mixed Doubles Curling Championship	~~16~~ 14	Scotland; Norway; Sweden; Canada; Italy; Switzerland; Czech Republic; United States; ~~China~~; Germany; ~~Russia~~; New Zealand; Australia; England; Hungary; Japan
World Rankings	4	South Korea; Finland; Estonia; Turkey
Emergency Ruling Replacement	1	Spain
Withdrawal Replacement	1	Denmark
TOTAL	20	

=== Russian participation ===
As part of international sports' reaction to the Russian invasion of Ukraine, on February 28 the World Curling Federation initiated proceedings to remove the Russian Curling Federation from the 2022 Curling Championship, pending until March 3. In its statement the WCF said:

The World Curling Federation strongly condemns the military action undertaken by the Russian Government in their invasion of Ukraine and continues to hope for a swift and peaceful resolution to the situation.

On March 4, 2022, the WCF announced the removal of the RCF from the 2022 World Curling Championships. Their vacated spot was offered to Spain, who accepted.

=== Chinese withdrawal ===
Due to ongoing travel restrictions related to the COVID-19 pandemic, China decided to withdraw from the tournament. Their spot was replaced by Denmark.

=== World ranking ===
The World Curling Federation World Ranking tracks and lists the success of all Member Associations.

Member Associations	Rank	Points
Canada	1	81.857
Switzerland	2	66.799
Norway	3	57.410
Sweden	4	46.498
United States	5	42.954
Scotland	7	37.579
South Korea	8	34.678
Czech Republic	10	30.248
Finland	11	26.524
Japan	12	20.754
Italy	13	20.491
Australia	14	19.335
Hungary	15	16.988
Estonia	16	14.109
Turkey	17	12.089
Germany	18	11.345
England	19	10.364
Spain	20	10.047
New Zealand	21	9.794
Denmark	23	6.377

== Teams ==
The teams are as follows:

Australia	Canada	Czech Republic	Denmark
Female: Tahli Gill; Male: Dean Hewitt	Female: Jocelyn Peterman; Male: Brett Gallant	Female: Julie Zelingrová; Male: Vít Chabičovský	Female: Jasmin Lander; Male: Henrik Holtermann
England	Estonia	Finland	Germany
Female: Anna Fowler; Male: Ben Fowler	Female: Marie Kaldvee; Male: Harri Lill	Female: Lotta Immonen; Male: Markus Sipilä	Female: Pia-Lisa Schöll; Male: Klaudius Harsch
Hungary	Italy	Japan	New Zealand
Female: Ildikó Szekeres; Male: György Nagy	Female: Stefania Constantini; Male: Sebastiano Arman	Female: Chiaki Matsumura; Male: Yasumasa Tanida	Female: Natalie Thurlow; Male: Warren Dobson
Norway	Scotland	South Korea	Spain
Female: Maia Ramsfjell; Male: Magnus Ramsfjell	Female: Eve Muirhead; Male: Bobby Lammie	Female: Kim Min-ji; Male: Lee Ki-jeong	Female: Oihane Otaegi; Male: Mikel Unanue
Sweden	Switzerland	Turkey	United States
Female: Isabella Wranå; Male: Rasmus Wranå	Female: Alina Pätz; Male: Sven Michel	Female: Dilşat Yıldız; Male: Muhammed Zeki Uçan	Female: Becca Hamilton; Male: Matt Hamilton

== Round robin standings ==
Final Round Robin Standings

Key
Teams to Playoffs (Top 3 in each group)
Teams to Relegation Playoff (8th and 9th place in each group)
Teams relegated to 2023 Qualification Event (10th place in each group)

Group A	W	L	W–L	DSC
Switzerland	7	2	1–1	16.40
Sweden	7	2	1–1	20.57
Norway	7	2	1–1	21.51
Italy	6	3	1–0	24.19
Japan	6	3	0–1	37.17
Denmark	4	5	–	43.68
Estonia	3	6	1–0	65.02
South Korea	3	6	0–1	34.23
Finland	2	7	–	25.84
New Zealand	0	9	–	54.24

Group B	W	L	W–L	DSC
Scotland	9	0	–	19.31
Canada	8	1	–	22.31
Germany	6	3	–	25.35
United States	5	4	–	25.94
Hungary	4	5	1–0	50.52
Australia	4	5	0–1	33.31
Czech Republic	3	6	1–0	40.14
England	3	6	0–1	44.31
Spain	2	7	–	66.91
Turkey	1	8	–	41.14

Group A Round Robin Summary Table
Pos.	Country	Denmark	Estonia	Finland	Italy	Japan	New Zealand	Norway	South Korea	Sweden	Switzerland	Record
6	Denmark	—N/a	6–2	7–5	3–8	5–6	9–5	2–9	7–5	3–8	3–9	4–5
7	Estonia	2–6	—	4–9	7–9	9–7	13–3	1–12	8–3	8–10	2–9	3–6
9	Finland	5–7	9–4	—	3–10	3–11	11–1	4–8	5–9	3–8	2–7	2–7
4	Italy	8–3	9–7	10–3	—	10–3	10–1	3–9	7–5	4–7	7–11	6–3
5	Japan	6–5	7–9	11–3	3–10	—	8–2	6–5	11–3	5–8	8–6	6–3
10	New Zealand	5–9	3–13	1–11	1–10	2–8	—	1–9	4–9	2–12	3–11	0–9
3	Norway	9–2	12–1	8–4	9–3	5–6	9–1	—	11–3	4–7	9–3	7–2
8	South Korea	5–7	3–8	9–5	5–7	3–11	9–4	3–11	—	12–5	2–9	3–6
2	Sweden	8–3	10–8	8–3	7–4	8–5	12–2	7–4	5–12	—	4–9	7–2
1	Switzerland	9–3	9–2	7–2	11–7	6–8	11–3	3–9	9–2	9–4	—	7–2

Group B Round Robin Summary Table
Pos.	Country	Australia	Canada	Czech Republic	England	Germany	Hungary	Scotland	Spain	Turkey	United States	Record
6	Australia	—	2–10	8–9	8–5	5–6	5–7	4–9	12–4	8–5	12–5	4–5
2	Canada	10–2	—	10–4	6–2	9–3	10–1	4–8	8–2	10–5	8–5	8–1
7	Czech Republic	9–8	4–10	—	7–4	2–13	7–11	3–9	2–7	9–7	6–9	3–6
8	England	5–8	2–6	4–7	—	3–7	6–8	3–8	11–1	9–6	7–4	3–6
3	Germany	6–5	3–9	13–2	7–3	—	10–4	4–8	7–5	10–2	3–7	6–3
5	Hungary	7–5	1–10	11–7	8–6	4–10	—	4–10	9–6	3–6	2–8	4–5
1	Scotland	9–4	8–4	9–3	8–3	8–4	10–4	—	10–3	10–2	7–2	9–0
9	Spain	4–12	2–8	7–2	1–11	5–7	6–9	3–10	—	9–2	2–8	2–7
10	Turkey	5–8	5–10	7–9	6–9	2–10	6–3	2–10	2–9	—	6–12	1–8
4	United States	5–12	5–8	9–6	4–7	7–3	8–2	2–7	8–2	12–6	—	5–4

== Round robin results ==
All draw times are listed in Central European Summer Time (UTC+02:00).

=== Draw 1 ===
Saturday, April 23, 10:00 am

Sheet A	1	2	3	4	5	6	7	8	Final
Italy (Constantini / Arman) 🔨	2	0	1	0	4	2	1	X	10
Japan (Matsumura / Tanida)	0	1	0	2	0	0	0	X	3

Sheet B	1	2	3	4	5	6	7	8	Final
Norway (Ramsfjell / Ramsfjell)	0	1	0	1	0	1	0	1	4
Sweden (Wranå / Wranå) 🔨	2	0	1	0	2	0	2	0	7

Sheet C	1	2	3	4	5	6	7	8	Final
Finland (Immonen / Sipilä) 🔨	1	0	0	2	1	0	1	X	5
Denmark (Lander / Holtermann)	0	3	1	0	0	3	0	X	7

Sheet D	1	2	3	4	5	6	7	8	Final
Switzerland (Pätz / Michel) 🔨	0	1	1	2	0	3	2	X	9
Estonia (Kaldvee / Lill)	1	0	0	0	1	0	0	X	2

Sheet E	1	2	3	4	5	6	7	8	Final
New Zealand (Thurlow / Dobson) 🔨	1	0	0	1	0	2	0	X	4
South Korea (Kim / Lee)	0	3	2	0	2	0	2	X	9

=== Draw 2 ===
Saturday, April 23, 2:00 pm

Sheet A	1	2	3	4	5	6	7	8	Final
Czech Republic (Zelingrová / Chabičovský) 🔨	1	2	0	0	0	3	0	0	6
United States (Hamilton / Hamilton)	0	0	3	2	2	0	1	1	9

Sheet B	1	2	3	4	5	6	7	8	Final
Germany (Schöll / Harsch)	0	0	0	2	0	1	0	X	3
Canada (Peterman / Gallant) 🔨	2	1	2	0	1	0	3	X	9

Sheet C	1	2	3	4	5	6	7	8	Final
Hungary (Szekeres / Nagy) 🔨	2	0	0	2	0	3	0	X	7
Australia (Gill / Hewitt)	0	1	1	0	1	0	2	X	5

Sheet D	1	2	3	4	5	6	7	8	Final
Spain (Otaegi / Unanue) 🔨	2	1	1	0	2	0	3	X	9
Turkey (Yıldız / Uçan)	0	0	0	1	0	1	0	X	2

Sheet E	1	2	3	4	5	6	7	8	Final
England (Fowler / Fowler)	0	0	2	0	0	1	0	X	3
Scotland (Muirhead / Lammie) 🔨	1	1	0	1	3	0	2	X	8

=== Draw 3 ===
Saturday, April 23, 6:00 pm

Sheet A	1	2	3	4	5	6	7	8	Final
Sweden (Wranå / Wranå)	0	0	2	0	0	2	0	X	4
Switzerland (Pätz / Michel) 🔨	3	1	0	2	2	0	1	X	9

Sheet B	1	2	3	4	5	6	7	8	Final
Japan (Matsumura / Tanida) 🔨	2	0	2	0	2	0	0	1	7
Estonia (Kaldvee / Lill)	0	2	0	1	0	5	1	0	9

Sheet C	1	2	3	4	5	6	7	8	Final
New Zealand (Thurlow / Dobson)	0	0	1	0	0	0	X	X	1
Italy (Constantini / Arman) 🔨	4	1	0	1	2	2	X	X	10

Sheet D	1	2	3	4	5	6	7	8	Final
South Korea (Kim / Lee) 🔨	1	0	0	0	3	0	1	X	5
Denmark (Lander / Holtermann)	0	1	2	2	0	2	0	X	7

Sheet E	1	2	3	4	5	6	7	8	Final
Norway (Ramsfjell / Ramsfjell)	0	1	0	2	1	1	2	1	8
Finland (Immonen / Sipilä) 🔨	2	0	2	0	0	0	0	0	4

=== Draw 4 ===
Sunday, April 24, 10:00 am

Sheet A	1	2	3	4	5	6	7	8	Final
Canada (Peterman / Gallant) 🔨	0	2	1	2	1	0	2	X	8
Spain (Otaegi / Unanue)	1	0	0	0	0	1	0	X	2

Sheet B	1	2	3	4	5	6	7	8	Final
United States (Hamilton / Hamilton) 🔨	1	0	3	0	4	0	4	X	12
Turkey (Yıldız / Uçan)	0	1	0	2	0	3	0	X	6

Sheet C	1	2	3	4	5	6	7	8	Final
England (Fowler / Fowler)	0	0	1	1	0	2	0	X	4
Czech Republic (Zelingrová / Chabičovský) 🔨	1	1	0	0	4	0	1	X	7

Sheet D	1	2	3	4	5	6	7	8	Final
Scotland (Muirhead / Lammie) 🔨	1	0	1	0	4	0	3	X	9
Australia (Gill / Hewitt)	0	1	0	1	0	2	0	X	4

Sheet E	1	2	3	4	5	6	7	8	Final
Germany (Schöll / Harsch) 🔨	0	2	0	4	1	0	3	X	10
Hungary (Szekeres / Nagy)	1	0	2	0	0	1	0	X	4

=== Draw 5 ===
Sunday, April 24, 2:00 pm

Sheet A	1	2	3	4	5	6	7	8	Final
Denmark (Lander / Holtermann)	0	0	1	0	1	0	0	X	2
Norway (Ramsfjell / Ramsfjell) 🔨	1	1	0	1	0	5	1	X	9

Sheet B	1	2	3	4	5	6	7	8	Final
Italy (Constantini / Arman)	0	2	0	2	0	1	1	1	7
South Korea (Kim / Lee) 🔨	1	0	3	0	1	0	0	0	5

Sheet C	1	2	3	4	5	6	7	8	Final
Japan (Matsumura / Tanida)	0	1	0	3	0	2	0	2	8
Switzerland (Pätz / Michel) 🔨	1	0	2	0	1	0	2	0	6

Sheet D	1	2	3	4	5	6	7	8	Final
Finland (Immonen / Sipilä) 🔨	3	1	2	0	4	1	X	X	11
New Zealand (Thurlow / Dobson)	0	0	0	1	0	0	X	X	1

Sheet E	1	2	3	4	5	6	7	8	9	Final
Sweden (Wranå / Wranå) 🔨	0	1	1	0	0	3	0	3	2	10
Estonia (Kaldvee / Lill)	1	0	0	4	2	0	1	0	0	8

=== Draw 6 ===
Sunday, April 24, 6:00 pm

Sheet A	1	2	3	4	5	6	7	8	Final
Australia (Gill / Hewitt)	0	2	1	1	0	1	0	0	5
Germany (Schöll / Harsch) 🔨	1	0	0	0	1	0	3	1	6

Sheet B	1	2	3	4	5	6	7	8	Final
Czech Republic (Zelingrová / Chabičovský) 🔨	0	2	0	0	0	1	0	X	3
Scotland (Muirhead / Lammie)	1	0	2	1	1	0	4	X	9

Sheet C	1	2	3	4	5	6	7	8	Final
United States (Hamilton / Hamilton) 🔨	0	1	2	1	1	0	3	X	8
Spain (Otaegi / Unanue)	1	0	0	0	0	1	0	X	2

Sheet D	1	2	3	4	5	6	7	8	Final
Hungary (Szekeres / Nagy)	2	2	1	0	3	0	0	X	8
England (Fowler / Fowler) 🔨	0	0	0	2	0	3	1	X	6

Sheet E	1	2	3	4	5	6	7	8	Final
Canada (Peterman / Gallant)	0	1	1	0	3	0	5	X	10
Turkey (Yıldız / Uçan) 🔨	1	0	0	1	0	3	0	X	5

=== Draw 7 ===
Monday, April 25, 10:00 am

Sheet A	1	2	3	4	5	6	7	8	Final
Estonia (Kaldvee / Lill)	0	5	0	0	4	2	2	X	13
New Zealand (Thurlow / Dobson) 🔨	1	0	1	1	0	0	0	X	3

Sheet B	1	2	3	4	5	6	7	8	Final
Finland (Immonen / Sipilä)	0	0	0	0	2	0	0	X	2
Switzerland (Pätz / Michel) 🔨	1	1	1	2	0	1	1	X	7

Sheet C	1	2	3	4	5	6	7	8	Final
South Korea (Kim / Lee)	0	1	3	3	4	0	1	X	12
Sweden (Wranå / Wranå) 🔨	1	0	0	0	0	4	0	X	5

Sheet D	1	2	3	4	5	6	7	8	Final
Denmark (Lander / Holtermann)	0	1	0	1	0	1	0	X	3
Italy (Constantini / Arman) 🔨	2	0	2	0	2	0	2	X	8

Sheet E	1	2	3	4	5	6	7	8	Final
Japan (Matsumura / Tanida) 🔨	0	2	0	1	0	0	1	2	6
Norway (Ramsfjell / Ramsfjell)	1	0	1	0	2	1	0	0	5

=== Draw 8 ===
Monday, April 25, 2:00 pm

Sheet A	1	2	3	4	5	6	7	8	9	Final
Turkey (Yıldız / Uçan) 🔨	0	1	0	1	0	2	0	2	0	6
England (Fowler / Fowler)	2	0	1	0	2	0	1	0	3	9

Sheet B	1	2	3	4	5	6	7	8	Final
Hungary (Szekeres / Nagy) 🔨	2	0	0	1	0	3	3	X	9
Spain (Otaegi / Unanue)	0	1	2	0	3	0	0	X	6

Sheet C	1	2	3	4	5	6	7	8	Final
Scotland (Muirhead / Lammie)	0	1	0	2	1	0	4	X	8
Canada (Peterman / Gallant) 🔨	1	0	1	0	0	2	0	X	4

Sheet D	1	2	3	4	5	6	7	8	9	Final
Australia (Gill / Hewitt) 🔨	0	3	2	0	0	1	1	1	0	8
Czech Republic (Zelingrová / Chabičovský)	2	0	0	3	3	0	0	0	1	9

Sheet E	1	2	3	4	5	6	7	8	Final
United States (Hamilton / Hamilton)	2	0	0	1	1	0	2	1	7
Germany (Schöll / Harsch) 🔨	0	1	1	0	0	1	0	0	3

=== Draw 9 ===
Monday, April 25, 6:00 pm

Sheet A	1	2	3	4	5	6	7	8	Final
Finland (Immonen / Sipilä)	0	2	0	0	0	1	X	X	3
Sweden (Wranå / Wranå) 🔨	1	0	5	1	1	0	X	X	8

Sheet B	1	2	3	4	5	6	7	8	Final
New Zealand (Thurlow / Dobson) 🔨	0	1	0	0	0	1	0	X	2
Japan (Matsumura / Tanida)	1	0	2	2	2	0	1	X	8

Sheet C	1	2	3	4	5	6	7	8	9	Final
Italy (Constantini / Arman) 🔨	2	2	1	0	1	0	1	0	2	9
Estonia (Kaldvee / Lill)	0	0	0	1	0	4	0	2	0	7

Sheet D	1	2	3	4	5	6	7	8	Final
Norway (Ramsfjell / Ramsfjell) 🔨	0	2	3	0	1	0	5	X	11
South Korea (Kim / Lee)	1	0	0	1	0	1	0	X	3

Sheet E	1	2	3	4	5	6	7	8	Final
Switzerland (Pätz / Michel) 🔨	1	0	2	2	0	1	3	X	9
Denmark (Lander / Holtermann)	0	2	0	0	1	0	0	X	3

=== Draw 10 ===
Tuesday, April 26, 10:00 am

Sheet A	1	2	3	4	5	6	7	8	Final
Hungary (Szekeres / Nagy) 🔨	0	0	0	1	0	0	X	X	1
Canada (Peterman / Gallant)	2	1	3	0	3	1	X	X	10

Sheet B	1	2	3	4	5	6	7	8	Final
England (Fowler / Fowler)	1	0	2	1	1	0	2	0	7
United States (Hamilton / Hamilton) 🔨	0	2	0	0	0	1	0	1	4

Sheet C	1	2	3	4	5	6	7	8	Final
Czech Republic (Zelingrová / Chabičovský) 🔨	0	5	0	0	3	0	1	0	9
Turkey (Yıldız / Uçan)	1	0	1	2	0	2	0	1	7

Sheet D	1	2	3	4	5	6	7	8	Final
Germany (Schöll / Harsch)	0	1	0	1	0	2	0	X	4
Scotland (Muirhead / Lammie) 🔨	2	0	2	0	2	0	2	X	8

Sheet E	1	2	3	4	5	6	7	8	Final
Spain (Otaegi / Unanue)	0	0	0	2	0	2	0	X	4
Australia (Gill / Hewitt) 🔨	6	1	1	0	1	0	3	X	12

=== Draw 11 ===
Tuesday, April 26, 2:00 pm

Sheet A	1	2	3	4	5	6	7	8	Final
New Zealand (Thurlow / Dobson)	0	0	1	3	0	1	0	X	5
Denmark (Lander / Holtermann) 🔨	3	2	0	0	3	0	1	X	9

Sheet B	1	2	3	4	5	6	7	8	Final
Sweden (Wranå / Wranå)	0	2	0	2	1	0	2	X	7
Italy (Constantini / Arman) 🔨	2	0	1	0	0	1	0	X	4

Sheet C	1	2	3	4	5	6	7	8	Final
Switzerland (Pätz / Michel) 🔨	0	0	2	0	1	0	X	X	3
Norway (Ramsfjell / Ramsfjell)	2	1	0	2	0	4	X	X	9

Sheet D	1	2	3	4	5	6	7	8	Final
Estonia (Kaldvee / Lill) 🔨	0	1	0	0	3	0	0	X	4
Finland (Immonen / Sipilä)	3	0	1	1	0	3	1	X	9

Sheet E	1	2	3	4	5	6	7	8	Final
South Korea (Kim / Lee)	0	0	2	0	1	0	0	X	3
Japan (Matsumura / Tanida) 🔨	3	1	0	1	0	1	5	X	11

=== Draw 12 ===
Tuesday, April 26, 6:00 pm

Sheet A	1	2	3	4	5	6	7	8	Final
England (Fowler / Fowler)	3	0	2	0	0	0	0	0	5
Australia (Gill / Hewitt) 🔨	0	1	0	2	1	1	2	1	8

Sheet B	1	2	3	4	5	6	7	8	Final
Canada (Peterman / Gallant) 🔨	2	3	1	0	1	0	3	X	10
Czech Republic (Zelingrová / Chabičovský)	0	0	0	3	0	1	0	X	4

Sheet C	1	2	3	4	5	6	7	8	Final
Spain (Otaegi / Unanue) 🔨	2	0	0	0	0	1	0	2	5
Germany (Schöll / Harsch)	0	1	3	1	1	0	1	0	7

Sheet D	1	2	3	4	5	6	7	8	Final
Turkey (Yıldız / Uçan) 🔨	1	0	0	1	2	2	0	X	6
Hungary (Szekeres / Nagy)	0	1	1	0	0	0	1	X	3

Sheet E	1	2	3	4	5	6	7	8	Final
Scotland (Muirhead / Lammie) 🔨	1	0	2	2	2	0	X	X	7
United States (Hamilton / Hamilton)	0	1	0	0	0	1	X	X	2

=== Draw 13 ===
Wednesday, April 27, 10:00 am

Sheet A	1	2	3	4	5	6	7	8	Final
Norway (Ramsfjell / Ramsfjell) 🔨	4	2	0	4	1	1	X	X	12
Estonia (Kaldvee / Lill)	0	0	1	0	0	0	X	X	1

Sheet B	1	2	3	4	5	6	7	8	Final
South Korea (Kim / Lee) 🔨	0	0	3	2	1	0	3	X	9
Finland (Immonen / Sipilä)	3	1	0	0	0	1	0	X	5

Sheet C	1	2	3	4	5	6	7	8	Final
Denmark (Lander / Holtermann) 🔨	3	0	0	1	0	0	1	0	5
Japan (Matsumura / Tanida)	0	1	1	0	2	1	0	1	6

Sheet D	1	2	3	4	5	6	7	8	Final
New Zealand (Thurlow / Dobson)	0	0	0	0	2	0	X	X	2
Sweden (Wranå / Wranå) 🔨	1	3	3	2	0	3	X	X	12

Sheet E	1	2	3	4	5	6	7	8	Final
Italy (Constantini / Arman)	0	3	0	1	0	2	1	0	7
Switzerland (Pätz / Michel) 🔨	6	0	3	0	1	0	0	1	11

=== Draw 14 ===
Wednesday, April 27, 2:00 pm

Sheet A	1	2	3	4	5	6	7	8	Final
Germany (Schöll / Harsch) 🔨	4	1	0	1	3	1	X	X	10
Turkey (Yıldız / Uçan)	0	0	2	0	0	0	X	X	2

Sheet B	1	2	3	4	5	6	7	8	Final
Scotland (Muirhead / Lammie) 🔨	3	0	2	0	5	0	X	X	10
Hungary (Szekeres / Nagy)	0	1	0	2	0	1	X	X	4

Sheet C	1	2	3	4	5	6	7	8	Final
Australia (Gill / Hewitt)	0	2	2	0	4	0	4	X	12
United States (Hamilton / Hamilton) 🔨	2	0	0	2	0	1	0	X	5

Sheet D	1	2	3	4	5	6	7	8	Final
England (Fowler / Fowler) 🔨	0	1	0	0	0	0	1	X	2
Canada (Peterman / Gallant)	2	0	1	1	1	1	0	X	6

Sheet E	1	2	3	4	5	6	7	8	Final
Czech Republic (Zelingrová / Chabičovský) 🔨	1	0	0	0	0	0	1	X	2
Spain (Otaegi / Unanue)	0	1	1	2	1	2	0	X	7

=== Draw 15 ===
Wednesday, April 27, 6:00 pm

Sheet A	1	2	3	4	5	6	7	8	Final
Japan (Matsumura / Tanida)	0	2	2	0	5	0	2	X	11
Finland (Immonen / Sipilä) 🔨	1	0	0	1	0	1	0	X	3

Sheet B	1	2	3	4	5	6	7	8	Final
Switzerland (Pätz / Michel) 🔨	4	2	0	3	0	2	X	X	11
New Zealand (Thurlow / Dobson)	0	0	1	0	2	0	X	X	3

Sheet C	1	2	3	4	5	6	7	8	Final
Estonia (Kaldvee / Lill) 🔨	2	2	0	0	3	1	0	X	8
South Korea (Kim / Lee)	0	0	1	1	0	0	1	X	3

Sheet D	1	2	3	4	5	6	7	8	Final
Italy (Constantini / Arman)	0	0	0	1	0	2	X	X	3
Norway (Ramsfjell / Ramsfjell) 🔨	1	1	1	0	6	0	X	X	9

Sheet E	1	2	3	4	5	6	7	8	Final
Denmark (Lander / Holtermann)	0	2	0	0	0	1	0	X	3
Sweden (Wranå / Wranå) 🔨	1	0	2	1	2	0	2	X	8

=== Draw 16 ===
Thursday, April 28, 10:00 am

Sheet A	1	2	3	4	5	6	7	8	Final
United States (Hamilton / Hamilton) 🔨	2	2	1	0	3	0	X	X	8
Hungary (Szekeres / Nagy)	0	0	0	1	0	1	X	X	2

Sheet B	1	2	3	4	5	6	7	8	Final
Spain (Otaegi / Unanue)	0	0	0	1	0	0	X	X	1
England (Fowler / Fowler) 🔨	1	2	2	0	5	1	X	X	11

Sheet C	1	2	3	4	5	6	7	8	Final
Turkey (Yıldız / Uçan)	0	0	0	0	0	2	X	X	2
Scotland (Muirhead / Lammie) 🔨	2	2	2	3	1	0	X	X	10

Sheet D	1	2	3	4	5	6	7	8	Final
Czech Republic (Zelingrová / Chabičovský)	0	1	0	0	1	0	X	X	2
Germany (Schöll / Harsch) 🔨	1	0	5	1	0	6	X	X	13

Sheet E	1	2	3	4	5	6	7	8	Final
Australia (Gill / Hewitt)	0	1	0	0	0	1	X	X	2
Canada (Peterman / Gallant) 🔨	2	0	3	2	3	0	X	X	10

=== Draw 17 ===
Thursday, April 28, 2:00 pm

Sheet A	1	2	3	4	5	6	7	8	Final
Switzerland (Pätz / Michel) 🔨	3	2	2	0	1	1	X	X	9
South Korea (Kim / Lee)	0	0	0	2	0	0	X	X	2

Sheet B	1	2	3	4	5	6	7	8	Final
Estonia (Kaldvee / Lill) 🔨	0	1	0	0	0	1	0	X	2
Denmark (Lander / Holtermann)	1	0	1	2	1	0	1	X	6

Sheet C	1	2	3	4	5	6	7	8	Final
Norway (Ramsfjell / Ramsfjell) 🔨	1	3	2	1	2	0	X	X	9
New Zealand (Thurlow / Dobson)	0	0	0	0	0	1	X	X	1

Sheet D	1	2	3	4	5	6	7	8	Final
Sweden (Wranå / Wranå)	0	1	2	2	0	2	0	1	8
Japan (Matsumura / Tanida) 🔨	1	0	0	0	2	0	2	0	5

Sheet E	1	2	3	4	5	6	7	8	Final
Finland (Immonen / Sipilä) 🔨	0	1	0	0	2	0	0	X	3
Italy (Constantini / Arman)	2	0	2	1	0	4	1	X	10

=== Draw 18 ===
Thursday, April 28, 6:00 pm

Sheet A	1	2	3	4	5	6	7	8	Final
Spain (Otaegi / Unanue) 🔨	1	0	1	0	0	1	0	X	3
Scotland (Muirhead / Lammie)	0	3	0	2	2	0	3	X	10

Sheet B	1	2	3	4	5	6	7	8	Final
Turkey (Yıldız / Uçan) 🔨	0	0	2	0	3	0	0	X	5
Australia (Gill / Hewitt)	1	1	0	1	0	3	2	X	8

Sheet C	1	2	3	4	5	6	7	8	Final
Germany (Schöll / Harsch) 🔨	1	0	2	0	2	0	2	X	7
England (Fowler / Fowler)	0	1	0	1	0	1	0	X	3

Sheet D	1	2	3	4	5	6	7	8	Final
Canada (Peterman / Gallant) 🔨	0	2	0	2	0	3	0	1	8
United States (Hamilton / Hamilton)	1	0	1	0	1	0	2	0	5

Sheet E	1	2	3	4	5	6	7	8	Final
Hungary (Szekeres / Nagy) 🔨	3	1	0	1	0	4	0	2	11
Czech Republic (Zelingrová / Chabičovský)	0	0	2	0	4	0	1	0	7

== Relegation playoff ==
Friday, April 29, 9:00 am

Sheet D	1	2	3	4	5	6	7	8	Final
South Korea (Kim / Lee)	0	5	0	2	0	1	0	X	8
Spain (Otaegi / Unanue) 🔨	1	0	2	0	1	0	1	X	5

Player percentages
South Korea		Spain	
Kim Min-ji	85%	Oihane Otaegi	68%
Lee Ki-jeong	82%	Mikel Unanue	78%
Total	83%	Total	74%

Sheet E	1	2	3	4	5	6	7	8	Final
England (Fowler / Fowler) 🔨	1	2	0	0	1	0	2	X	6
Finland (Immonen / Sipilä)	0	0	1	1	0	1	0	X	3

Player percentages
England		Finland	
Anna Fowler	73%	Lotta Immonen	63%
Ben Fowler	69%	Markus Sipilä	58%
Total	71%	Total	61%

== Playoffs ==
Qualification games
B2	Canada	5
A3	Norway	6
A2	Sweden	8
B3	Germany	11

Semifinals
A1	Switzerland	8
A3	Norway	7
B1	Scotland	8
B3	Germany	3

Final
A1	Switzerland	7
B1	Scotland	9
Bronze medal match
A3	Norway	5
B3	Germany	7

=== Qualification Game 1 ===
Friday, April 29, 9:00 am

Sheet B	1	2	3	4	5	6	7	8	9	Final
Sweden (Wranå / Wranå) 🔨	2	0	1	1	0	2	0	2	0	8
Germany (Schöll / Harsch)	0	3	0	0	1	0	4	0	3	11

Player percentages
Sweden		Germany	
Isabella Wranå	72%	Pia-Lisa Schöll	87%
Rasmus Wranå	81%	Klaudius Harsch	87%
Total	78%	Total	87%

=== Qualification Game 2 ===
Friday, April 29, 12:30 pm

Sheet B	1	2	3	4	5	6	7	8	Final
Canada (Peterman / Gallant) 🔨	1	1	0	1	0	0	2	0	5
Norway (Ramsfjell / Ramsfjell)	0	0	1	0	1	2	0	2	6

Player percentages
Canada		Norway	
Jocelyn Peterman	83%	Maia Ramsfjell	68%
Brett Gallant	72%	Magnus Ramsfjell	79%
Total	76%	Total	75%

=== Semifinal 1 ===
Friday, April 29, 4:00 pm

Sheet C	1	2	3	4	5	6	7	8	Final
Scotland (Muirhead / Lammie) 🔨	1	0	3	2	0	1	1	X	8
Germany (Schöll / Harsch)	0	2	0	0	1	0	0	X	3

Player percentages
Scotland		Germany	
Eve Muirhead	75%	Pia-Lisa Schöll	55%
Bobby Lammie	83%	Klaudius Harsch	63%
Total	80%	Total	60%

=== Semifinal 2 ===
Friday, April 29, 7:30 pm

Sheet C	1	2	3	4	5	6	7	8	9	Final
Switzerland (Pätz / Michel) 🔨	3	0	0	0	3	0	1	0	1	8
Norway (Ramsfjell / Ramsfjell)	0	1	1	1	0	1	0	3	0	7

Player percentages
Switzerland		Norway	
Alina Pätz	76%	Maia Ramsfjell	88%
Sven Michel	86%	Magnus Ramsfjell	87%
Total	82%	Total	87%

=== Bronze medal match ===
Saturday, April 30, 10:00 am

Sheet C	1	2	3	4	5	6	7	8	Final
Norway (Ramsfjell / Ramsfjell) 🔨	0	0	1	1	0	3	0	0	5
Germany (Schöll / Harsch)	1	2	0	0	1	0	2	1	7

Player percentages
Norway		Germany	
Maia Ramsfjell	72%	Pia-Lisa Schöll	81%
Magnus Ramsfjell	81%	Klaudius Harsch	89%
Total	78%	Total	86%

=== Final ===
Saturday, April 30, 2:00 pm

Sheet C	1	2	3	4	5	6	7	8	Final
Switzerland (Pätz / Michel)	0	0	2	0	2	2	0	1	7
Scotland (Muirhead / Lammie) 🔨	4	1	0	2	0	0	2	0	9

Player percentages
Switzerland		Scotland	
Alina Pätz	70%	Eve Muirhead	77%
Sven Michel	82%	Bobby Lammie	84%
Total	78%	Total	81%

== Statistics ==
=== Player percentages ===
Final Round Robin Percentages

Female	%
(Scotland) Eve Muirhead	90.4
(Canada) Jocelyn Peterman	80.7
(Italy) Stefania Constantini	79.4
(Sweden) Isabella Wranå	77.9
(Norway) Maia Ramsfjell	76.4
(Switzerland) Alina Pätz	75.8
(South Korea) Kim Min-ji	70.7
(Hungary) Ildikó Szekeres	70.0
(Denmark) Jasmin Lander	69.3
(Japan) Chiaki Matsumura	69.0
(England) Anna Fowler	67.0
(Germany) Pia-Lisa Schöll	66.2
(United States) Becca Hamilton	66.0
(Estonia) Marie Kaldvee	66.0
(Finland) Lotta Immonen	65.7
(Turkey) Dilşat Yıldız	65.0
(Australia) Tahli Gill	62.8
(Spain) Oihane Otaegi	59.7
(Czech Republic) Julie Zelingrová	58.3
(New Zealand) Natalie Thurlow	48.5

Male	%
(Scotland) Bobby Lammie	85.3
(Sweden) Rasmus Wranå	83.0
(Canada) Brett Gallant	82.6
(Italy) Sebastiano Arman	82.2
(Germany) Klaudius Harsch	77.1
(Australia) Dean Hewitt	77.0
(Switzerland) Sven Michel	77.0
(Japan) Yasumasa Tanida	76.7
(United States) Matt Hamilton	76.3
(Norway) Magnus Ramsfjell	74.7
(Estonia) Harri Lill	73.2
(South Korea) Lee Ki-jeong	72.9
(England) Ben Fowler	70.5
(Denmark) Henrik Holtermann	69.9
(Spain) Mikel Unanue	69.2
(Hungary) György Nagy	68.2
(Turkey) Muhammed Zeki Uçan	66.0
(Czech Republic) Vít Chabičovský	61.8
(Finland) Markus Sipilä	59.1
(New Zealand) Warren Dobson	57.8

=== Top 5 playoff player percentages ===
Final playoff percentages

Female	%
(Canada) Jocelyn Peterman	83.0
(Norway) Maia Ramsfjell	76.0
(Scotland) Eve Muirhead	76.0
(Germany) Pia-Lisa Schöll	74.3
(Switzerland) Alina Pätz	73.0

Male	%
(Norway) Magnus Ramsfjell	85.0
(Switzerland) Sven Michel	84.0
(Scotland) Bobby Lammie	83.5
(Sweden) Rasmus Wranå	81.0
(Germany) Klaudius Harsch	79.6

== Final standings ==
Key
Teams relegated to 2022 World Mixed Doubles Qualification Event

Place	Team
1st place, gold medalist(s)	Scotland
2nd place, silver medalist(s)	Switzerland
3rd place, bronze medalist(s)	Germany
4	Norway
5	Canada
5	Sweden
7	Italy
8	United States
9	Japan
10	Hungary

Place	Team
11	Australia
12	Denmark
13	Czech Republic
14	Estonia
15	England
15	South Korea
17	Finland
17	Spain
19	Turkey
20	New Zealand
