= Mixed Doubles Prague Trophy =

World Curling Tour event

- Established: 2022
- Host city: Prague, Czech Republic
- Arena: Curling Arena Prague
- Purse: € 3,000
- 2026 champion: (Czech Republic) Julie Zelingrová / Vít Chabičovský

The WCT Mixed Doubles Prague Trophy is an annual mixed doubles curling tournament on the ISS Mixed Doubles World Curling Tour. It is held annually at the Curling Arena Prague in Prague, Czech Republic.

The purse for the event is € 3,350 and its event categorization is 300 (highest calibre is 1000). The winning team wins € 1,450 with second place receiving € 900, third receiving € 600 and fourth earning € 400.

As the event is run in April, it attracts many top international mixed doubles teams due to its proximity to the World Mixed Doubles Curling Championships which are held a few weeks after. In 2024, fifteen countries were represented across twenty-four teams.

The event began in 2022.

== Past champions ==
Year	Winning pair	Runner up pair	Third place	Fourth place	Purse
2022	(Czech Republic) Zuzana Paulová / Tomáš Paul	(England) Anna Fowler / Ben Fowler	(Denmark) Jasmin Lander / Henrik Holtermann	(Czech Republic) Julie Zelingrová / Vít Chabičovský	€ 3,350
2023	(Finland) Lotta Immonen / Markus Sipilä	(Estonia) Marie Turmann / Harri Lill	(Netherlands) Vanessa Tonoli / Wouter Gösgens	(Switzerland) Lea Hüppi / Jonas Weiss	€ 3,350
2024	(China) Han Yu / Zou Qiang	(Germany) Emira Abbes / Klaudius Harsch	(Denmark) Jasmin Lander / Henrik Holtermann	(Australia) Tahli Gill / Dean Hewitt	€ 3,350
2025	(Germany) Pia-Lisa Schöll / Joshua Sutor	(Czech Republic) Klára Cihlářová / Tomáš Macek	(Czech Republic) Kristýna Farková / David Jakl	(Czech Republic) Julie Zelingrová / Vít Chabičovský	€ 3,750
2026	(Czech Republic) Julie Zelingrová / Vít Chabičovský	(Czech Republic) Kristýna Farková / David Jakl	(Hungary) Dorottya Udvardi-Palancsa / Lőrinc Tatár	(Czech Republic) Klára Cihlářová / Tomáš Macek	€ 3,000
