= English Women's Curling Championship =

National curling championship

- Established: 1976
- 2025 champion: Angharad Ward

The English Women's Curling Championship is the national women's curling championship for England.The championship decides which team of curlers is sent to the European Curling Championships (and the same year's World Curling Championships, if England qualifies) the following season. It has been held annually since 1976. It is organized by the English Curling Association.

== Past champions ==
Year	Skip	Vice	Second	Lead	Alternate	Place at Euros next season	Place at Worlds this season
1976	Jeanette Forrest	Enid Logan	Mary Aitchison	Dorothy Shell		(bronze) (1976)	
1977	not held					5th	
1978	Connie Miller	Susan Hinds	Christine Black	Freda Fisher		8th	
1979	Jeanette Forrest	Enid Logan	Mary Aitchison	Dorothy Shell		9th	11th
1980	Gwen French	Jean Picken	June Henry	Lynda Clegg		11th	
1981	Gwen French	Pauline Douglas	Jean Picken	Lynda Clegg		12th	
1982	Christine Short	Margaret Maxwell	Anne Walton	Anne Harvey		10th	
1983	Gwen French	Jean Picken	Mary Finlay	June Henry		12th	
1984	Gwen French	Jean Picken	Mary Finlay	Doris Vickers		8th	
1985	Margaret Maxwell	Enid Logan	Caroline Cumming	Dorothy Shell		13th	
1986	Jean Picken	Lynda Clegg	Mary Finlay	Doris Vickers		11th	
1987	Caroline Cumming	Aileen Gemmell	Alison Arthur	Penni Hinds		10th	
1988	Joan Reed	Christine Short	Moira Davison	Margaret Martin		8th	
1989	Caroline Cumming	Aileen Gemmell	Alison Arthur	Penni Davis		13th	
1990	Joan Reed	Venetia Scott	Margaret Martin	Moira Davison		13th	
1991	Joan Reed	Venetia Scott	Margaret Martin	Moira Davison		11th	
1992	Sally Gray	Sarah Johnston	Janice Manson	Pam Wright	Alison Bowman	8th	
1993	Sally Gray	Sarah Johnston	Janice Manson	Pam Wright	Alison Bowman	7th	9th
1994	Joan Reed	Venetia Scott	Moira Davison	Irene Laidler		11th	
1995	Janice Manson	Sarah Johnston	Pam Wright	Jane Johnston		9th	
1996	Janice Manson	Sarah Johnston	Pam Wright	Jane Johnston		13th	
1997	Joan Reed	June Swan	Glynnice Lauder	Moira Davison		8th	
1998	Joan Reed	June Swan	Glynnice Lauder	Lesley Kemish		9th	
1999	Sarah Johnston	Joan Ross	Jacqueline Ambridge	Christine Robinson		9th	
2000	Joan Reed	Lorna Rettig	Fiona Hawker	Fiona Turner		11th	
2001	Sarah Johnston	Joan Ross	Jacqueline Ambridge	Christine Robinson		12th	
2002	Sarah Johnston	Lorna Rettig	Fiona Hawker	Kirsty Balfour		12th	
2003	not held					10th	
2004	not held					17th	
2005	Joan Reed	Lorna Rettig	Claire Grimwood	Kirsty Balfour		13th	
2006	Joan Reed	Lorna Rettig	Claire Grimwood	Kirsty Balfour		13th	
2007	Kirsty Balfour	Joan Reed	Claire Grimwood	Caroline Reed		11th	
2008	Kirsty Balfour	Caroline Reed	Claire Grimwood	Sarah McVey		8th	
2009	Kirsty Balfour	Caroline Reed	Suzie Law	Nicola Woodward		10th	
2010	Lorna Rettig	Kirsty Balfour	Nicola Woodward	Suzie Law		15th	
2011	Fiona Hawker	Anna Fowler	Angharad Ward	Debbie Hutcheon		17th	
2012	Fiona Hawker	Susan Young	Alison Hemmings	Debbie Hutcheon		17th	
2013	Anna Fowler	Hetty Garnier	Naomi Robinson	Lauren Pearce		13th	
2014	not held					16th	
2015	not held					14th	
2016	not held					15th	
2017	Lisa Farnell	Sára Jahodová	Victoria Kyle	Niamh Fenton		15th	
2018	Lisa Farnell	Sára Jahodová	Victoria Kyle	Niamh Fenton		16th	
2019	not held					14th	
2020	Hetty Garnier	Anna Fowler	Lorna Rettig	Lucy Sparks	Naomi Robinson		
2021	not held due to the COVID-19 pandemic in the United Kingdom					14th	
2022	not held					17th	
2023	Anna Fowler	Hetty Garnier	Angharad Ward	Naomi Robinson			
2024	not held						
2025	Angharad Ward	Annabelle Martin	Anna Howey	Naomi Robinson			
2026							

== See also ==
- English Men's Curling Championship
- English Mixed Doubles Curling Championship
- English Mixed Curling Championship
