= English Mixed Curling Championship =

- Established: 2005
- 2019 champion: Fiona Spain

The English Mixed Curling Championship is the national mixed curling championship for England. The championship usually decides which team of curlers is sent to the following season's World Mixed Curling Championship (from 2015) or the European Mixed Curling Championship (before 2015). It has been held annually since 2005. It is organized by the English Curling Association.

== Past champions ==
Year	Skip	Third	Second	Lead	Alternate	Place at Euros next season	Place at Worlds next season
2005	Alan MacDougall	Joan Reed	Chris Robinson	Claire Grimwood		12th	
2006	not held						
2007	Alan MacDougall	Lana Watson	Andrew Reed	Suzie Law		11th	
2008	Alan MacDougall	Lana Watson	Andrew Reed	Suzie Law		10th	
2009	Alan MacDougall	Lana Watson	Andrew Reed	Suzie Law		(bronze) (2009)	
2010	Alan MacDougall	Lana Watson	Andrew Reed	Suzie Law		4th	
2011	Alan MacDougall	Lana Watson	Andrew Reed	Suzie Law		10th	
2012	Bryan Zachary	Lauren Pearce	Kerr Alexander	Naomi Robinson	Angharad Ward	21st	
2013	John Sharp	Lorna Rettig	Nigel Patrick	Alison Hemmings		17th	
2014	Ben Fowler	Lorna Rettig	Nigel Patrick	Anna Fowler		14th	
2015	Arthur Bates	Lana Watson	Harry Mallows	Sára Jahodová			30th
2016	Greg Dunn	Angharad Ward	Nigel Patrick	Lorna Rettig			19th
2017	Andrew Woolston	Lesley Gregory	Scott Gibson	Kirsty Balfour			9th
2018	Greg Dunn	Lorna Rettig	Jonathan Braden	Sydney Boyd			31st
2019	Stuart Brand (fourth)	Fiona Spain (skip)	Johnathan Havercroft	Kathryn Spain			22nd
2020	Lisa Farnell	James Burman	Kitty Conlin	Ian Gasson			N/A
2021	Not held (Covid)						N/A
2022	Jonathan Havercroft (Vice)	Fiona Spain (Skip)	Micheal Opel	Samantha Leung			29th
2023	Ben Fowler (Vice)	Anna Fowler (Skip)	Scott Gibson	Annabelle Martin			14th
2024	Andrew Woolston	Lesley Gregory	Martin Gregory	Kirsty Balfour			25th
2025	Matthew Waring (Skip)	Chloe McNaughton	Callum McLain	Marianna Ward (Vice)			N/A
2026	Joe Sugden	Larisa Simonova	Felix Price	Anna Howey			

== See also ==
- English Men's Curling Championship
- English Women's Curling Championship
- English Mixed Doubles Curling Championship
