= Sára Jahodová =

Czech female curler and coach

- Curler ♀

Team
- Curling club: CC Dion, Prague, CC Zbraslav, Zbraslav, CZE

Curling career
- Member Association: Czech Republic; England
- World Championship: 2 (2008, 2012)
- European Championship: 3 (2007, 2017, 2018)
- Other appearances: World Mixed Championship: 1 (2015), European Mixed Championship: 1 (2010)
Medal record
Curling
English Women's Championship
Gold medal – first place	2017
Gold medal – first place	2018

Sára Jahodová is a Czech and later British female curler and curling coach.

== Teams ==
=== Women's ===
Season	Skip	Third	Second	Lead	Alternate	Coach	Events
2007–08	Kateřina Urbanová (fourth)	Lenka Černovská (skip)	Jana Šafaříková	Dana Chabičovská (ECC); Sára Jahodová (WCC)	Sára Jahodová (ECC); Jana Šimmerová (WCC)	Vlastimil Vojtus	ECC 2007 (8th); WCC 2008 (12th)
2010–11	Linda Klímová	Lenka Černovská	Kamila Mošová	Sára Jahodová			
2012	Linda Klímová	Kamila Mošová	Lenka Černovská	Kateřina Urbanová	Sára Jahodová	Vladimir Cernovsky	WCC 2012 (12th)
2016–17	Lisa Farnell	Sára Jahodová	Victoria Kyle	Niamh Fenton		Jamie Farnell	EWCC 2017 (gold)
2017–18	Lisa Farnell	Sára Jahodová	Victoria Kyle	Niamh Fenton		Jamie Farnell	ECC 2017 (15th); EWCC 2018 (gold)
2018–19	Lisa Farnell	Sára Jahodová	Victoria Kyle	Niamh Fenton		Jamie Farnell	ECC 2018 (16th)

=== Mixed ===
Season	Skip	Third	Second	Lead	Alternate	Coach	Events
2010–11	Radek Boháč	Sára Jahodová	Petr Horak	Klara Bousková	Lenka Černovská, Marek Cernovský		EMxCC 2010 (11th)
2014–15	Arthur Bates	Lana Watson	Harry Mallows	Sára Jahodová			EngMxCC 2015 (gold)
2015–16	Arthur Bates	Lana Watson	Harry Mallows	Sára Jahodová		Radek Boháč	WMxCC 2015 (30th)

== Record as a coach of national teams ==
Year	Tournament, event	National team	Place
2014	2014 European Junior Curling Challenge	England (junior men)	6
2014	2014 European Junior Curling Challenge	England (junior women)	3rd place, bronze medalist(s)
2015	2015 European Junior Curling Challenge	England (junior men)	10
2015	2015 European Junior Curling Challenge	England (junior women)	1st place, gold medalist(s)
