= 2024 Mixed Doubles Prague Trophy =

- Host city: Prague, Czech Republic
- Arena: Curling Arena Prague
- Dates: April 4–7
- Winner: (China) Han / Zou
- Female: Han Yu
- Male: Zou Qiang
- Finalist: (Germany) Abbes / Harsch

The 2024 Mixed Doubles Prague Trophy was held from April 4 to 7 at the Curling Arena Prague in Prague, Czech Republic. The event was held in a round robin format with a purse of € 3,350. Many international teams competed in the event as it was held two weeks before the 2024 World Mixed Doubles Curling Championship which was played in Östersund, Sweden.

China's Han Yu and Zou Qiang went undefeated to win the event, defeating Germany's Emira Abbes and Klaudius Harsch 8–5 in the championship game. After taking three in the first end, the Chinese rink scored four in the fourth end to take an 8–1 lead which the Germans did not recover from. To reach the championship game, Han and Zou won all five of their preliminary round matches, being the only team to do so. They then defeated Estonia's Marie Kaldvee and Harri Lill 7–5 in the quarterfinals and won 6–4 over Denmark's Jasmin Lander and Henrik Holtermann in the semifinals. For Abbes and Harsch, they qualified for the playoffs as the eighth and final seeds with a 4–1 record. They then scored a 9–8 upset win over top seeds Yang Ying and Tian Jiafeng of China in the quarterfinals before going on to beat Australia's Tahli Gill and Dean Hewitt in the semifinals. Turkey's Dilşat Yıldız and Bilal Ömer Çakır and Czech Republic's Zuzana Paulová and Tomáš Paul rounded out the playoff teams.

In the third place game, Lander and Holtermann won 8–3 over Gill and Hewitt.

== Teams ==
The teams are listed as follows:

Female	Male	Locale
Emira Abbes	Klaudius Harsch	Füssen, Germany
Aleksandra Bigosińska	Arkadiusz Polak	Kraków, Poland
Klára Cihlářová	Tomáš Maček	Prague, Czech Republic
Kristýna Farková	David Jákl	Prague, Czech Republic
Tahli Gill	Dean Hewitt	Brisbane, Australia
Han Yu	Zou Qiang	Beijing, China
Lea Hüppi	Jonas Weiss	Dübendorf, Switzerland
Lotta Immonen	Markus Sipilä	Espoo, Finland
Marie Kaldvee	Harri Lill	Tallinn, Estonia
Kim Ji-yoon	Jeong Byeong-jin	Seoul, South Korea
Sofie Krupičková	Ondřej Bláha	Prague, Czech Republic
Jasmin Lander	Henrik Holtermann	Hvidovre, Denmark
Daniela Matulová	Milan Moravčík	Bratislava, Slovakia
Oihane Otaegi	Mikel Unanue	San Sebastián, Spain
Zuzana Paulová	Tomáš Paul	Prague, Czech Republic
Jenny Perret	Martin Rios	Glarus, Switzerland
Pia-Lisa Schöll	Joshua Sutor	Oberstdorf, Germany
Kseniya Shevchuk	Wilfrid Coulot	Megève, France
Eliška Srnská	Jaroslav Vedral	Prague, Czech Republic
Emma Erzsébet Szurmay	Baján Kán Ferenci	Budapest, Hungary
Adela Walczak	Andrzej Augustyniak	Łódź, Poland
Yang Ying	Tian Jiafeng	Beijing, China
Dilşat Yıldız	Bilal Ömer Çakır	Erzurum, Turkey
Julie Zelingrová	Vít Chabičovský	Prague, Czech Republic

== Round robin standings ==
Final Round Robin Standings

Key
Teams to Playoffs

Pool A	W	L	W–L	PF	PA	SO
(Turkey) Yıldız / Çakır	4	1	1–0	33	19	23
(Estonia) Kaldvee / Lill	4	1	0–1	46	22	6
(South Korea) Kim / Jeong	3	2	–	36	33	13
(Spain) Otaegi / Unanue	2	3	–	33	32	18
(Poland) Bigosińska / Polak	1	4	1–0	19	40	24
(Czech Republic) Srnská / Vedral	1	4	0–1	22	43	22

Pool B	W	L	W–L	PF	PA	SO
(Denmark) Lander / Holtermann	4	1	1–0	33	25	5
(Czech Republic) Paulová / Paul	4	1	0–1	41	29	11
(Germany) Schöll / Sutor	3	2	–	37	22	16
(Czech Republic) Krupičková / Bláha	2	3	1–0	25	33	9
(France) Shevchuk / Coulot	2	3	0–1	30	35	17
(Switzerland) Hüppi / Weiss	0	5	–	19	41	19

Pool C	W	L	W–L	PF	PA	SO
(China) Han / Zou	5	0	–	43	20	10
(Australia) Gill / Hewitt	4	1	–	41	25	2
(Poland) Walczak / Augustyniak	3	2	–	33	26	7
(Czech Republic) Farková / Jákl	2	3	–	26	32	8
(Finland) Immonen / Sipilä	1	4	–	18	31	11
(Hungary) Szurmay / Ferenci	0	5	–	16	43	20

Pool D	W	L	W–L	PF	PA	SO
(China) Yang / Tian	4	1	1–0	40	28	1
(Germany) Abbes / Harsch	4	1	0–1	45	23	15
(Switzerland) Perret / Rios	3	2	1–0	37	30	4
(Czech Republic) Zelingrová / Chabičovský	3	2	1–0	38	25	3
(Czech Republic) Cihlářová / Maček	1	4	–	19	40	14
(Slovakia) Matulová / Moravčík	0	5	–	18	51	21

== Round robin results ==
All draw times listed in Central European Summer Time (UTC+02:00).

=== Draw 1 ===
Thursday, April 4, 5:00 pm

Sheet A	1	2	3	4	5	6	7	8	Final
(Czech Republic) Srnská / Vedral	2	1	0	2	0	2	1	X	8
(Spain) Otaegi / Unanue	0	0	1	0	4	0	0	X	5

Sheet B	1	2	3	4	5	6	7	8	Final
(Germany) Schöll / Sutor	2	2	1	2	1	X	X	X	8
(Czech Republic) Krupičková / Bláha	0	0	0	0	0	X	X	X	0

Sheet C	1	2	3	4	5	6	7	8	Final
(Czech Republic) Farková / Jákl	0	5	1	1	0	3	X	X	10
(Hungary) Szurmay / Ferenci	1	0	0	0	1	0	X	X	2

Sheet D	1	2	3	4	5	6	7	8	Final
(Czech Republic) Zelingrová / Chabičovský	2	1	2	0	5	0	X	X	10
(Slovakia) Matulová / Moravčík	0	0	0	1	0	1	X	X	2

=== Draw 2 ===
Thursday, April 4, 7:15 pm

Sheet A	1	2	3	4	5	6	7	8	Final
(Estonia) Kaldvee / Lill	0	4	1	0	0	1	0	2	8
(South Korea) Kim / Jeong	1	0	0	1	1	0	1	0	4

Sheet B	1	2	3	4	5	6	7	8	Final
(Czech Republic) Paulová / Paul	0	0	3	0	1	4	0	0	8
(Denmark) Lander / Holtermann	1	1	0	3	0	0	3	1	9

Sheet C	1	2	3	4	5	6	7	8	Final
(Australia) Gill / Hewitt	1	0	1	2	0	1	0	2	7
(Poland) Walczak / Augustyniak	0	3	0	0	1	0	1	0	5

Sheet D	1	2	3	4	5	6	7	8	Final
(Czech Republic) Cihlářová / Maček	0	2	0	0	0	1	X	X	3
(Germany) Abbes / Harsch	1	0	4	1	3	0	X	X	9

=== Draw 3 ===
Thursday, April 4, 9:30 pm

Sheet A	Final
(Poland) Bigosińska / Polak	L
(Turkey) Yıldız / Çakır	W

Sheet B	1	2	3	4	5	6	7	8	Final
(Switzerland) Hüppi / Weiss	0	2	0	2	0	1	0	X	5
(France) Shevchuk / Coulot	1	0	3	0	5	0	2	X	11

Sheet C	1	2	3	4	5	6	7	8	Final
(China) Han / Zou	3	1	2	2	1	X	X	X	9
(Finland) Immonen / Sipilä	0	0	0	0	0	X	X	X	0

Sheet D	1	2	3	4	5	6	7	8	Final
(China) Yang / Tian	1	1	0	1	1	0	2	1	7
(Switzerland) Perret / Rios	0	0	3	0	0	3	0	0	6

=== Draw 4 ===
Friday, April 5, 8:00 am

Sheet A	1	2	3	4	5	6	7	8	9	Final
(Czech Republic) Zelingrová / Chabičovský	1	1	0	1	1	0	1	0	0	5
(Germany) Abbes / Harsch	0	0	2	0	0	2	0	1	1	6

Sheet B	1	2	3	4	5	6	7	8	Final
(Czech Republic) Srnská / Vedral	0	0	2	0	1	0	1	X	4
(South Korea) Kim / Jeong	1	1	0	4	0	1	0	X	7

Sheet C	1	2	3	4	5	6	7	8	Final
(Germany) Schöll / Sutor	1	0	1	0	1	1	1	2	7
(Denmark) Lander / Holtermann	0	3	0	1	0	0	0	0	4

Sheet D	1	2	3	4	5	6	7	8	Final
(Czech Republic) Farková / Jákl	2	0	0	0	0	0	0	X	2
(Poland) Walczak / Augustyniak	0	2	1	1	1	1	4	X	10

=== Draw 5 ===
Friday, April 5, 10:15 am

Sheet A	1	2	3	4	5	6	7	8	Final
(Slovakia) Matulová / Moravčík	0	1	0	1	0	3	X	X	5
(China) Yang / Tian	6	0	1	0	4	0	X	X	11

Sheet B	1	2	3	4	5	6	7	8	Final
(Spain) Otaegi / Unanue	6	2	1	1	0	0	1	X	11
(Poland) Bigosińska / Polak	0	0	0	0	2	1	0	X	3

Sheet C	1	2	3	4	5	6	7	8	Final
(Czech Republic) Krupičková / Bláha	1	0	0	0	3	0	2	1	7
(Switzerland) Hüppi / Weiss	0	1	1	1	0	2	0	0	5

Sheet D	1	2	3	4	5	6	7	8	Final
(Hungary) Szurmay / Ferenci	0	0	0	4	0	1	0	X	5
(China) Han / Zou	1	2	1	0	3	0	3	X	10

=== Draw 6 ===
Friday, April 5, 1:30 pm

Sheet A	1	2	3	4	5	6	7	8	Final
(Czech Republic) Cihlářová / Maček	1	0	0	0	2	0	1	X	4
(Switzerland) Perret / Rios	0	4	2	2	0	1	0	X	9

Sheet B	1	2	3	4	5	6	7	8	Final
(Estonia) Kaldvee / Lill	2	1	0	1	1	0	0	0	5
(Turkey) Yıldız / Çakır	0	0	2	0	0	3	2	2	9

Sheet C	1	2	3	4	5	6	7	8	Final
(Czech Republic) Paulová / Paul	0	1	1	1	0	2	0	2	7
(France) Shevchuk / Coulot	2	0	0	0	2	0	2	0	6

Sheet D	1	2	3	4	5	6	7	8	Final
(Australia) Gill / Hewitt	4	0	2	0	1	0	1	0	8
(Finland) Immonen / Sipilä	0	2	0	2	0	1	0	1	6

=== Draw 7 ===
Friday, April 5, 3:45 pm

Sheet A	1	2	3	4	5	6	7	8	Final
(China) Han / Zou	2	0	2	2	1	1	0	X	8
(Czech Republic) Farková / Jákl	0	3	0	0	0	0	1	X	4

Sheet B	1	2	3	4	5	6	7	8	9	Final
(China) Yang / Tian	0	0	0	0	3	0	2	2	0	7
(Czech Republic) Zelingrová / Chabičovský	1	1	1	2	0	2	0	0	1	8

Sheet C	1	2	3	4	5	6	7	8	9	Final
(Poland) Bigosińska / Polak	0	0	0	3	0	2	2	0	3	10
(Czech Republic) Srnská / Vedral	1	3	1	0	1	0	0	1	0	7

Sheet D	1	2	3	4	5	6	7	8	Final
(Switzerland) Hüppi / Weiss	0	0	0	2	0	0	X	X	2
(Germany) Schöll / Sutor	1	2	2	0	2	1	X	X	8

=== Draw 8 ===
Friday, April 5, 7:15 pm

Sheet A	1	2	3	4	5	6	7	8	Final
(Poland) Walczak / Augustyniak	1	0	2	2	0	1	0	X	6
(Finland) Immonen / Sipilä	0	1	0	0	1	0	2	X	4

Sheet B	1	2	3	4	5	6	7	8	Final
(Germany) Abbes / Harsch	0	4	0	1	1	0	4	X	10
(Switzerland) Perret / Rios	2	0	1	0	0	2	0	X	5

Sheet C	1	2	3	4	5	6	7	8	Final
(South Korea) Kim / Jeong	2	0	4	0	2	0	1	1	10
(Turkey) Yıldız / Çakır	0	3	0	3	0	2	0	0	8

Sheet D	1	2	3	4	5	6	7	8	Final
(Denmark) Lander / Holtermann	1	0	3	1	1	0	X	X	6
(France) Shevchuk / Coulot	0	1	0	0	0	1	X	X	2

=== Draw 9 ===
Friday, April 5, 9:30 pm

Sheet A	1	2	3	4	5	6	7	8	Final
(Hungary) Szurmay / Ferenci	1	0	2	0	0	0	X	X	3
(Australia) Gill / Hewitt	0	3	0	3	1	3	X	X	10

Sheet B	1	2	3	4	5	6	7	8	9	Final
(Slovakia) Matulová / Moravčík	1	0	3	0	0	1	0	3	0	8
(Czech Republic) Cihlářová / Maček	0	1	0	2	1	0	4	0	1	9

Sheet C	1	2	3	4	5	6	7	8	9	Final
(Spain) Otaegi / Unanue	0	1	0	1	2	0	0	2	0	6
(Estonia) Kaldvee / Lill	1	0	1	0	0	3	1	0	2	8

Sheet D	1	2	3	4	5	6	7	8	Final
(Czech Republic) Krupičková / Bláha	3	0	0	0	0	0	X	X	3
(Czech Republic) Paulová / Paul	0	2	2	1	1	2	X	X	8

=== Draw 10 ===
Saturday, April 6, 8:00 am

Sheet A	1	2	3	4	5	6	7	8	Final
(France) Shevchuk / Coulot	0	0	2	1	0	3	1	X	7
(Germany) Schöll / Sutor	1	2	0	0	3	0	0	X	6

Sheet B	1	2	3	4	5	6	7	8	Final
(Finland) Immonen / Sipilä	0	0	0	0	0	1	X	X	1
(Czech Republic) Farková / Jákl	1	1	2	1	2	0	X	X	7

Sheet C	1	2	3	4	5	6	7	8	Final
(Switzerland) Perret / Rios	2	0	3	2	0	1	0	1	9
(Czech Republic) Zelingrová / Chabičovský	0	2	0	0	3	0	3	0	8

Sheet D	1	2	3	4	5	6	7	8	Final
(Turkey) Yıldız / Çakır	3	1	1	3	0	1	X	X	9
(Czech Republic) Srnská / Vedral	0	0	0	0	1	0	X	X	1

=== Draw 11 ===
Saturday, April 6, 10:15 am

Sheet A	1	2	3	4	5	6	7	8	Final
(Denmark) Lander / Holtermann	3	0	2	0	0	0	3	X	8
(Czech Republic) Krupičková / Bláha	0	1	0	1	1	1	0	X	4

Sheet B	1	2	3	4	5	6	7	8	Final
(Poland) Walczak / Augustyniak	0	1	0	1	0	2	0	2	6
(Hungary) Szurmay / Ferenci	1	0	2	0	1	0	1	0	5

Sheet C	1	2	3	4	5	6	7	8	Final
(Germany) Abbes / Harsch	4	0	1	4	0	4	X	X	13
(Slovakia) Matulová / Moravčík	0	1	0	0	1	0	X	X	2

Sheet D	1	2	3	4	5	6	7	8	Final
(South Korea) Kim / Jeong	0	0	2	0	2	1	1	0	6
(Spain) Otaegi / Unanue	1	2	0	3	0	0	0	2	8

=== Draw 12 ===
Saturday, April 6, 1:30 pm

Sheet A	1	2	3	4	5	6	7	8	Final
(Czech Republic) Paulová / Paul	1	1	3	1	1	0	2	X	9
(Switzerland) Hüppi / Weiss	0	0	0	0	0	3	0	X	3

Sheet B	1	2	3	4	5	6	7	8	Final
(Australia) Gill / Hewitt	0	1	2	0	1	0	1	X	5
(China) Han / Zou	2	0	0	2	0	4	0	X	8

Sheet C	1	2	3	4	5	6	7	8	Final
(Czech Republic) Cihlářová / Maček	0	2	0	0	0	0	0	X	2
(China) Yang / Tian	1	0	1	2	1	1	1	X	7

Sheet D	1	2	3	4	5	6	7	8	Final
(Estonia) Kaldvee / Lill	5	1	1	5	0	1	X	X	13
(Poland) Bigosińska / Polak	0	0	0	0	1	0	X	X	1

=== Draw 13 ===
Saturday, April 6, 3:45 pm

Sheet A	1	2	3	4	5	6	7	8	Final
(Turkey) Yıldız / Çakır	0	3	0	2	1	1	X	X	7
(Spain) Otaegi / Unanue	1	0	2	0	0	0	X	X	3

Sheet B	1	2	3	4	5	6	7	8	Final
(France) Shevchuk / Coulot	0	1	0	1	0	2	0	X	4
(Czech Republic) Krupičková / Bláha	1	0	4	0	2	0	4	X	11

Sheet C	1	2	3	4	5	6	7	8	Final
(Finland) Immonen / Sipilä	2	0	1	1	2	1	X	X	7
(Hungary) Szurmay / Ferenci	0	1	0	0	0	0	X	X	1

Sheet D	1	2	3	4	5	6	7	8	Final
(Switzerland) Perret / Rios	1	1	2	0	3	1	X	X	8
(Slovakia) Matulová / Moravčík	0	0	0	1	0	0	X	X	1

=== Draw 14 ===
Saturday, April 6, 7:15 pm

Sheet A	1	2	3	4	5	6	7	8	Final
(Czech Republic) Srnská / Vedral	0	1	0	1	0	0	X	X	2
(Estonia) Kaldvee / Lill	3	0	2	0	5	2	X	X	12

Sheet B	1	2	3	4	5	6	7	8	Final
(Germany) Schöll / Sutor	0	0	3	0	3	0	1	1	8
(Czech Republic) Paulová / Paul	2	2	0	4	0	1	0	0	9

Sheet C	1	2	3	4	5	6	7	8	Final
(Czech Republic) Farková / Jákl	0	0	1	1	0	1	0	X	3
(Australia) Gill / Hewitt	3	2	0	0	2	0	4	X	11

Sheet D	1	2	3	4	5	6	7	8	Final
(Czech Republic) Zelingrová / Chabičovský	1	1	2	1	2	0	X	X	7
(Czech Republic) Cihlářová / Maček	0	0	0	0	0	1	X	X	1

=== Draw 15 ===
Saturday, April 6, 9:30 pm

Sheet A	1	2	3	4	5	6	7	8	Final
(South Korea) Kim / Jeong	1	1	0	0	1	1	0	5	9
(Poland) Bigosińska / Polak	0	0	2	2	0	0	1	0	5

Sheet B	1	2	3	4	5	6	7	8	Final
(Denmark) Lander / Holtermann	1	2	0	1	0	1	0	1	6
(Switzerland) Hüppi / Weiss	0	0	1	0	2	0	1	0	4

Sheet C	1	2	3	4	5	6	7	8	Final
(Poland) Walczak / Augustyniak	0	0	0	3	1	0	2	X	6
(China) Han / Zou	1	2	1	0	0	4	0	X	8

Sheet D	1	2	3	4	5	6	7	8	Final
(Germany) Abbes / Harsch	0	1	0	1	0	3	0	2	7
(China) Yang / Tian	1	0	3	0	2	0	2	0	8

== Playoffs ==
The top two teams in each pool advanced to the playoffs. The teams that finished first in their pool were ranked 1–4 based on their shootout total, regardless of round robin record. The second placing teams were then ranked 5–8.

Quarterfinals
1	(China) Yang / Tian	8
8	(Germany) Abbes / Harsch	9
4	(Turkey) Yıldız / Çakır	6
5	(Australia) Gill / Hewitt	7
3	(China) Han / Zou	7
6	(Estonia) Kaldvee / Lill	5
2	(Denmark) Lander / Holtermann	6
7	(Czech Republic) Paulová / Paul	5

Semifinals
8	(Germany) Abbes / Harsch	8
5	(Australia) Gill / Hewitt	5
3	(China) Han / Zou	6
2	(Denmark) Lander / Holtermann	4

Final
8	(Germany) Abbes / Harsch	5
3	(China) Han / Zou	8

Third place game
5	(Australia) Gill / Hewitt	3
2	(Denmark) Lander / Holtermann	8

=== Quarterfinals ===
Sunday, April 7, 8:00 am

Sheet A	1	2	3	4	5	6	7	8	Final
(China) Han / Zou	0	0	1	0	2	1	1	2	7
(Estonia) Kaldvee / Lill	1	1	0	3	0	0	0	0	5

Sheet B	1	2	3	4	5	6	7	8	Final
(Denmark) Lander / Holtermann	2	1	0	0	0	2	1	0	6
(Czech Republic) Paulová / Paul	0	0	2	1	1	0	0	1	5

Sheet C	1	2	3	4	5	6	7	8	9	Final
(China) Yang / Tian	3	1	0	1	0	3	0	0	0	8
(Germany) Abbes / Harsch	0	0	1	0	2	0	4	1	1	9

Sheet D	1	2	3	4	5	6	7	8	Final
(Turkey) Yıldız / Çakır	0	0	0	3	2	0	1	0	6
(Australia) Gill / Hewitt	2	1	1	0	0	2	0	1	7

=== Semifinals ===
Sunday, April 7, 11:00 am

Sheet B	1	2	3	4	5	6	7	8	9	Final
(Germany) Abbes / Harsch	0	1	0	1	1	1	1	0	3	8
(Australia) Gill / Hewitt	3	0	1	0	0	0	0	1	0	5

Sheet C	1	2	3	4	5	6	7	8	Final
(China) Han / Zou	2	0	2	0	1	1	0	X	6
(Denmark) Lander / Holtermann	0	1	0	1	0	0	2	X	4

=== Third place game ===
Sunday, April 7, 2:00 pm

Sheet D	1	2	3	4	5	6	7	8	Final
(Australia) Gill / Hewitt	0	0	1	0	2	0	0	X	3
(Denmark) Lander / Holtermann	2	1	0	2	0	2	1	X	8

=== Final ===
Sunday, April 7, 2:00 pm

Sheet B	1	2	3	4	5	6	7	8	Final
(Germany) Abbes / Harsch	0	0	1	0	2	1	1	X	5
(China) Han / Zou	3	1	0	4	0	0	0	X	8
