= Ben Fowler =

English curler

- Curler
- Born: 9 December 1993 (age 32); Pembury, Kent, England

Team
- Curling club: St George's Club; Kent, England
- Mixed doubles partner: Anna Fowler

Curling career
- Member Association: England
- World Mixed Doubles Championship: 5 (2013, 2016, 2019, 2021, 2022)
- World Mixed Championship: 1 (2023)
- European Championship: 4 (2014, 2015, 2016, 2017)
- Other appearances: European Mixed Championship: 1 (2014), European Junior Challenge: 5 (2011, 2012, 2013, 2014, 2015)

Ben Fowler (born 9 December 1993) is an English curler focused on mixed doubles. He is part of the British Curling Podium Potential program.

He currently lives in Glasgow.

== Career ==
Fowler started curling in 2004 at the only rink in England at the time, Fenton's Rink. He quickly took to the sport and started work towards international curling. In 2013 he moved to Glasgow to focus on his training at the Braehead, Greenacres and Stirling curling rinks.

Fowler is now part of the British Curling Podium Potential program. While working with the program Fowler has focused solely on mixed doubles. With his sister Anna Fowler, he competed in 10 World Curling Tour Competitions finishing in 14th place on the tour.

Fowler has had 14 international appearances adding up to a total of 89 games (as of April 2019). He has also competed in several international invitational events such as the Audi Quattro Winter Games. His best results are a bronze medal in the 2014 European Championship B group and 8th in the 2016 World Mixed Doubles Championship.

At the national level, Fowler is a five-time English mixed doubles champion curler and one-time English mixed champion curler.
