= Janette Forrest =

English curler

- Curler ♀

Team
- Curling club: Glendale CC, Northumberland

Curling career
- Member Association: England
- World Championship: 1 (1979)
- European Championship: 2 (1977, 1978)
Medal record
Curling
English Women's Championship
Gold medal – first place	1976
Gold medal – first place	1979

Janette Forrest (other writing Jeanette Forrest) is an English curler.

At the national level, she is a two-time English women's champion (1976, 1979) curler.

At the international level, she competed for England as a skip at one World Women's Championship in 1979 (finishing 11th) and two European Championships (best result was a 5th-place finish).

== Teams ==
=== Women's curling ===
Season	Skip	Third	Second	Lead	Events
1975–76	Janette Forrest	Enid Logan	Mary Aitchison	Dorothy Shell	EngWCC 1976 (gold)
1977–78	Janette Forrest	Enid Logan	Mary Aitchison	Dorothy Shell	ECC 1977 (5th)
1978–79	Janette Forrest	Enid Logan	Mary Aitchison	Dorothy Shell	EngWCC 1979 (gold); WCC 1979 (11th)
1979–80	Janette Forrest	Enid Logan	Dorothy Shell	Mary Aitchison	ECC 1979 (9th)
