= Joan Reed =

English curler and coach

- Curler ♀
- Born: 19 February 1952 (age 74)

Team
- Curling club: Glendale CC, Northumberland

Curling career
- Member Association: England
- European Championship: 12 (1988, 1990, 1991, 1994, 1997, 1998, 2000, 2001, 2005, 2006, 2007, 2009)
- Other appearances: European Mixed Championship: 1 (2005), World Senior Championships: 9 (2003, 2004, 2005, 2007, 2008, 2015, 2016, 2018, 2019)
Medal record
Curling
World Senior Championships
Bronze medal – third place	2003 Winnipeg
English Women's Championship
Gold medal – first place	1988
Gold medal – first place	1990
Gold medal – first place	1991
Gold medal – first place	1994
Gold medal – first place	1997
Gold medal – first place	1998
Gold medal – first place	2000
Gold medal – first place	2005
Gold medal – first place	2006
Gold medal – first place	2007
English Mixed Championship
Gold medal – first place	2005

Joan Reed (born 19 February 1952) is an English curler and curling coach.

At the national level, she is a ten-time English women's champion (1988, 1990, 1991, 1994, 1997, 1998, 2000, 2005, 2006, 2007) and 2005 English mixed champion curler.

== Teams ==
=== Women's curling ===
Season	Skip	Third	Second	Lead	Alternate	Coach	Events
1987–88	Joan Reed	Christine Short	Moira Davison	Margaret Martin			EngWCC 1988 (gold)
1988–89	Joan Reed	Moira Davison	Christine Short	Margaret Martin			ECC 1988 (8th)
1989–90	Joan Reed	Venetia Scott	Margaret Martin	Moira Davison			EngWCC 1990 (gold)
1990–91	Moira Davison	Margaret Martin	Venetia Scott	Joan Reed	Margaret Cadzow		ECC 1990 (13th)
1990–91	Joan Reed	Venetia Scott	Margaret Martin	Moira Davison			EngWCC 1991 (gold)
1991–92	Joan Reed	Venetia Scott	Margaret Martin	Moira Davison	Christine Short		ECC 1991 (11th)
1993–94	Joan Reed	Venetia Scott	Moira Davison	Irene Laidler			EngWCC 1994 (gold)
1994–95	Joan Reed	Venetia Scott	Moira Davison	Irene Laidler			ECC 1994 (11th)
1996–97	Joan Reed	June Swan	Glynnice Lauder	Moira Davison			EngWCC 1997 (gold)
1997–98	Joan Reed	June Swan	Glynnice Lauder	Moira Davison	Jacqueline Ambridge	Ena Smith	ECC 1997 (8th)
1997–98	Joan Reed	June Swan	Glynnice Lauder	Lesley Kemish			EngWCC 1998 (gold)
1998–99	Joan Reed	June Swan	Glynnice Lauder	Lesley Kemish	Fiona Turner	Ena Smith	ECC 1998 (9th)
1999–00	Joan Reed	Lorna Rettig	Fiona Hawker	Fiona Turner			EngWCC 2000 (gold)
2000–01	Joan Reed	Lorna Rettig	Fiona Hawker	Fiona Turner	Joan Dixon	John Brown	ECC 2000 (11th)
2001–02	Sarah Johnston	Joan Ross	Jacqueline Ambridge	Christine Robinson	Joan Reed	Stephen Hinds	ECC 2001 (12th)
2002–03	Joan Reed	Glynnice Lauder	Venetia Scott	Moira Davison			WSCC 2003 (bronze)
2003–04	Joan Reed	Glynnice Lauder	Venetia Scott	Moira Davison			WSCC 2004 (4th)
2004–05	Joan Reed	Lorna Rettig	Claire Grimwood	Kirsty Balfour			EngWCC 2005 (gold)
2004–05	Joan Reed	Glynnice Lauder	Venetia Scott	Moira Davison	Mary Aitchison		WSCC 2005 (6th)
2005–06	Joan Reed	Lorna Rettig	Claire Grimwood	Kirsty Balfour	Caroline Reed	George Balfour, John Brown	ECC 2005 (13th)
2005–06	Joan Reed	Lorna Rettig	Claire Grimwood	Kirsty Balfour			EngWCC 2006 (gold)
2006–07	Joan Reed	Lorna Rettig	Claire Grimwood	Kirsty Balfour	Sarah McVey		ECC 2006 (13th)
2006–07	Kirsty Balfour	Joan Reed	Claire Grimwood	Caroline Reed			EngWCC 2007 (gold)
2006–07	Glynnice Lauder	Venetia Scott	Joan Reed	Moira Davison			WSCC 2007 (6th)
2007–08	Kirsty Balfour	Caroline Reed	Claire Grimwood	Sarah McVey	Joan Reed		ECC 2007 (11th)
2007–08	Glynnice Lauder	Venetia Scott	Joan Reed	Moira Davison			WSCC 2008 (9th)
2009–10	Kirsty Balfour	Caroline Reed	Suzie Law	Nicola Woodward	Joan Reed	Ross Balfour	ECC 2009 (10th)
2014–15	Judith Dixon	Joan Reed	Valerie Saville	Deborah Higgins			WSCC 2015 (8th)
2015–16	Judith Dixon	Joan Reed	Valerie Saville	Deborah Higgins	Helen Forbes	John Brown	WSCC 2016 (4th)
2017–18	Judith Dixon	Joan Reed	Helen Forbes	Deborah Higgins	Angela Wilcox		WSCC 2018 (7th)
2018–19	Judith Dixon	Joan Reed	Helen Forbes	Angela Wilcox			WSCC 2019 (7th)

=== Mixed curling ===
Season	Skip	Third	Second	Lead	Alternate	Coach	Events
2004–05	Alan MacDougall	Joan Reed	Chris Robinson	Claire Grimwood			EngMxCC 2005 (gold)
2005–06	Alan MacDougall	Joan Reed	Chris Robinson	Claire Grimwood	Forbes Fenton	Lorna Rettig	EuMxCC 2005 (12th)

== Record as a coach of national teams ==
Year	Tournament, event	National team	Place
2001	2001 European Curling Championships	England (men)	12
2002	2002 World Wheelchair Curling Championship	England (wheelchair)	6
2004	2004 World Wheelchair Curling Championship	England (wheelchair)	4
2004	2004 European Curling Championships	England (men)	13
2005	2005 World Wheelchair Curling Championship	England (wheelchair)	10
2006	2006 World Wheelchair Curling Qualification Competition	England (wheelchair)	5
2012	2012 European Curling Championships	England (men)	14
2015	2015 World Wheelchair-B Curling Championship	England (wheelchair)	11
2016	2016 World Wheelchair-B Curling Championship	England (wheelchair)	4
