= Lana Watson =

English curler

- Curler ♀
- Born: 1 October 1976 (age 50); Brandon, Manitoba

Team
- Mixed doubles partner: Alan MacDougall

Curling career
- Member Association: Manitoba; England
- World Mixed Doubles Championship: 1 (2015)
- European Championship: 1 (2004)
- Other appearances: World Mixed Championship: 1 (2015), European Mixed Championship: 5 (2007, 2008, 2009, 2010, 2011)
Medal record
Curling
European Mixed Curling Championships
Bronze medal – third place	2009 Prague
English Mixed Championship
Gold medal – first place	2007
Gold medal – first place	2008
Gold medal – first place	2009
Gold medal – first place	2010
Gold medal – first place	2011
Gold medal – first place	2015
English Mixed Doubles Championship
Gold medal – first place	2015

Lana Watson (born 1 October 1976 in Brandon, Manitoba) is a Canadian-English curler.

At the national level, she is a six-time English mixed champion and is a 2015 English mixed doubles champion curler.

She curled while growing up in Manitoba and even was on a women’s team with Brandonite Lois Fowler and three-time national champion Cathy Gauthier. She moved to England in 2002 to get a master’s degree in actuarial science and has stayed there since graduating to work as an actuary.

== Teams ==
=== Women's curling ===
==== Canada ====
Season	Skip	Third	Second	Lead	Events
2000–01	Lois Fowler	Gerri Cooke	Cathy Gauthier	Lana Watson	2001 MSTOH

==== England ====
Season	Skip	Third	Second	Lead	Alternate	Coach	Events
2004–05	Sarah Johnston	Fiona Hawker	Nicola Woodward	Lana Watson	Glenda Barrowman	Glenda Barrowman	ECC 2004 (17th)

=== Mixed curling ===
Season	Skip	Third	Second	Lead	Alternate	Coach	Events
2006–07	Alan MacDougall	Lana Watson	Andrew Reed	Suzie Law			EngMxCC 2007 (gold)
2007–08	Alan MacDougall	Lana Watson	Andrew Reed	Suzie Law			EMxCC 2007 (11th); EngMxCC 2008 (gold)
2008–09	Alan MacDougall	Lana Watson	John Sharp	Suzie Law			EMxCC 2008 (10th); EngMxCC 2009 (gold)
2009–10	Alan MacDougall	Lana Watson	Andrew Reed	Suzie Law			EMxCC 2009 (bronze); EngMxCC 2010 (gold)
2010–11	Alan MacDougall	Lana Watson	Andrew Reed	Suzie Law	John Sharp		EMxCC 2010 (4th); EngMxCC 2011 (gold)
2011–12	Alan MacDougall	Lana Watson	Andrew Woolston	Suzie Law			EMxCC 2011 (10th)
2014–15	Arthur Bates	Lana Watson	Harry Mallows	Sára Jahodová			EngMxCC 2015 (gold)
2015–16	Arthur Bates	Lana Watson	Harry Mallows	Sára Jahodová		Radek Boháč	WMxCC 2015 (30th)

=== Mixed doubles ===
Season	Female	Male	Events
2014–15	Lana Watson	Alan MacDougall	EngMDCC 2015 (gold); WMDCC 2015 (15th)
