= English Mixed Doubles Curling Championship =

- Established: 2008
- 2020 champion: Ben Fowler / Anna Fowler

The English Mixed Doubles Curling Championship is the national mixed doubles curling championship for England. The championship usually decides which team of curlers is sent to the World Mixed Doubles Curling Championship later that season (if England qualified for Worlds). It has been held annually since 2008. It is organized by the English Curling Association.

== Past champions ==
Year	Male curler	Female curler	Place at Worlds
2008	John Brown	Glynnice Lauder	23rd
2009	John Sharp	Jane Clark	19th
2010	John Sharp	Jane Clark	13th
2011	John Sharp	Jane Clark	20th
2012	John Sharp	Lorna Rettig	22nd
2013	Ben Fowler	Hetty Garnier	25th
2014	Bryan Zachary	Angharad Ward	33rd
2015	Alan MacDougall	Lana Watson	15th
2016	Ben Fowler	Anna Fowler	8th
2017	Ben Fowler	Anna Fowler	17th
2018	Tom Jaeggi	Anna Fowler	26th
2019	Ben Fowler	Anna Fowler	9th
2020	Ben Fowler	Anna Fowler	not held
2021	Ben Fowler	Anna Fowler	14th
2022	Micheal Opel	Lina Opel	
2023	Micheal Opel	Lina Opel	20th
2024	Micheal Opel	Lina Opel	
2025	Fraser Clark	Rachael Hotchkiss	
2026	Jonathan Havercroft	Larisa Simonova	

== See also ==
- English Men's Curling Championship
- English Women's Curling Championship
- English Mixed Curling Championship
