= Anna Fowler =

English curler

- Curler
- Born: 28 January 1991 (age 35)

Team
- Curling club: South England Curling Club, St George's Club, Kent, England
- Skip: Anna Fowler
- Third: Hetty Garnier
- Second: Angharad Ward
- Lead: Naomi Robinson
- Mixed doubles partner: Ben Fowler

Curling career
- Member Association: England
- World Mixed Doubles Championship: 7 (2013, 2016, 2017, 2018, 2019, 2021, 2022)
- World Mixed Championship: 1 (2023)
- European Championship: 6 (2011, 2013, 2014, 2015, 2016, 2021)
- Other appearances: European Mixed Championship: 1 (2014), European Junior Challenge: 3 (2009, 2010, 2011)
Medal record
Women's Curling
English Women's Championship
Gold medal – first place	2011
Gold medal – first place	2013
Gold medal – first place	2020
Gold medal – first place	2023
Silver medal – second place	2018
English Mixed Doubles Championship
Gold medal – first place	2016
Gold medal – first place	2017
Gold medal – first place	2018
Gold medal – first place	2019
Gold medal – first place	2020

Anna Fowler (born 28 January 1991) is an English curler.

At the national level, she is a four-time English women's champion (2011, 2013, 2020, 2023), 2014 English mixed champion, and five-time English mixed doubles champion (2016, 2017, 2018, 2019, 2020) curler.

Her brother Ben Fowler is also a curler, Anna's mixed and mixed doubles teammate.

== Teams ==
=== Women's curling ===
Season	Skip	Third	Second	Lead	Alternate	Coach	Events
2008–09	Anna Fowler	Sophie Hickling	Kate McKenzie	Hetty Garnier	Naomi Robinson	John Brown	EJCC 2009 (8th)
2009–10	Anna Fowler	Hetty Garnier	Naomi Robinson	Madeleine Tuz	Lauren Pearce		EJCC 2010 (10th)
2010–11	Anna Fowler	Hetty Garnier	Angharad Ward	Lauren Pearce	Naomi Robinson	Andrew Woolston	EJCC 2011 (8th)
2010–11	Fiona Hawker	Anna Fowler	Angharad Ward	Debbie Hutcheon			EngWCC 2011 (gold)
2011–12	Fiona Hawker	Anna Fowler	Angharad Ward	Deborah Hutcheon		Alison Arthur	ECC 2011 (17th)
2012–13	Anna Fowler	Hetty Garnier	Naomi Robinson	Lauren Pearce			EngWCC 2013 (gold)
2013–14	Anna Fowler	Hetty Garnier	Naomi Robinson	Lauren Pearce	Lucy Sparks	John Sharp	ECC 2013 (13th)
2014–15	Anna Fowler	Angharad Ward	Lauren Pearce	Naomi Robinson	Sarah Decoine	John Sharp	ECC 2014 (16th)
2015–16	Anna Fowler	Hetty Garnier	Angharad Ward	Lauren Pearce	Naomi Robinson	John Sharp	ECC 2015 (14th)
2016–17	Anna Fowler	Hetty Garnier	Angharad Ward	Lauren Pearce	Naomi Robinson	John Sharp	ECC 2016 (15th)
2017–18	Hetty Garnier (fourth)	Anna Fowler (skip)	Lorna Rettig	Kirsty Balfour	Naomi Robinson		EngWCC 2018 (silver)
2019–20	Hetty Garnier	Anna Fowler	Naomi Robinson	Lucinda Sparks	Lorna Rettig		EngWCC 2020 (gold)
2020–21	Hetty Garnier	Anna Fowler	Lorna Rettig	Naomi Robinson	Lucinda Sparks		
2021–22	Hetty Garnier	Anna Fowler	Angharad Ward	Naomi Robinson		Martin Sesaker	ECC 2021 (14th)

=== Mixed curling ===
Season	Skip	Third	Second	Lead	Events
2013–14	Ben Fowler	Lorna Rettig	Nigel Patrick	Anna Fowler	EngMxCC 2014 (gold)
2014–15	Ben Fowler	Lorna Rettig	Nigel Patrick	Anna Fowler	EMxCC 2014 (14th)

=== Mixed doubles ===
Season	Female	Male	Coach	Events
2012–13	Anna Fowler	Ben Fowler		WMDCC 2013 (25th)
2015–16	Anna Fowler	Ben Fowler	Nigel Patrick	EngMDCC 2016 (gold); WMDCC 2016 (8th)
2016–17	Anna Fowler	Ben Fowler	Nigel Patrick	EngMDCC 2017 (gold); WMDCC 2017 (17th)
2017–18	Anna Fowler	Tom Jaeggi	Nigel Patrick	EngMDCC 2018 (gold); WMDCC 2018 (26th)
2018–19	Anna Fowler	Ben Fowler	Greg Drummond	EngMDCC 2019 (gold); WMDCC 2019 (9th)
2019–20	Anna Fowler	Ben Fowler		EngMDCC 2020 (gold)
2020–21	Anna Fowler	Ben Fowler	David Ramsay	WMDCC 2021 (14th)
