= 2010 European Mixed Curling Championship =

- Host city: Howwood, Scotland
- Arena: Greenacres Curling Club
- Dates: September 21–25, 2010
- Winner: Scotland
- Curling club: Abderdeen Petroleum, Aberdeen
- Skip: David Edwards
- Third: Kerry Barr
- Second: Dillan Perras
- Lead: Louise Wood
- Finalist: Switzerland (Claudio Pätz)

The 2010 European Mixed Curling Championship was held at the Greenacres Curling Club in Howwood, Scotland. Scotland defeated Switzerland in the final to claim their third title. Germany won the bronze.

== Teams ==
Country	Skip	Third	Second	Lead	Alternate(s)
Austria	Claudia Toth	Florian Huber	Constanze Hummelt	Christian Roth	Karina Toth
Belarus	Dimitry Kirillov	Ekaterina Kirillova	Dzmitry Yarko	Alina Pauliuchyk	
Czech Republic	Radek Boháč	Sára Jahodová	Petr Horak	Klara Bousková	Lenka Černovská, Marek Cernovský
Denmark	Joel Ostrowski	Camilla Jensen	Søren Jensen	Ane Hakonsson Hansen	
England	Alan MacDougall	Lana Watson	Andrew Reed	Suzie Law	John Sharp
Estonia	Andres Jakobson	Reet Taidre	Jaanus Rannu	Viktoria Rudenko	Leo Jakobson
Finland	Tomi Rantamäki	Katja Kiiskinen	Kimmo Ilvonen	Marjo Hippi	
France	Stephanie Jaccaz	Bruno Barbarin	Laure Duponcel	Jerome Duponcel	Karine Caux, Jean-Paul Mutazzi
Germany	Rainer Schöpp	Andrea Schöpp	Floria Zahler	Imogen Oona Lehmann	Adolf Geiselhart
Hungary	Gabor Ezsöl	Orsolya Rokusfalvy	Tamas Szabad	Csilla Halasz	Andras Rokusfalvy, Gyöngyi Nagy
Ireland	John Kenny	Marie O'Kane	David Smith	Gillian Drury	Tony Tierney
Italy	Diana Gaspari	Malko Tondella	Sonia Dibona	Marcello Pachner	Chiara Olivieri, Roberto Fassina
Latvia	Artis Zentelis	Zanda Bikse	Peteris Sveisbergs	Ieva Berzina	Ieva Krusta
Netherlands	Laurens Van Der Windt	Christel Krösing	Luutze Koelewijn	Rosemarie Berghuijs	Kimberly Honders, Jaap Veerman
Norway	Stein Erik Johansen	Aina Engen	Eivind Sve	Lene Vollan	
Russia	Olga Jarkova	Alexey Stukalskiy	Anna Lobova	Alexander Kozyrev	Artur Razhabov, Viktoria Makarshina
Scotland	David Edwards	Kerry Barr	Dillan Perras	Louise Wood	
Serbia	Marko Stojanovic	Oliver Momcilovic	Bojan Mijatovic	Dara Gravara-Stojanovic	Goran Ungurovic, Tatjana Jeftic
Slovakia	Milan Kajan	Gabriela Kajanova	Rene Petko	Martina Kajanova	
Spain	Irantzu Garcia Vez	Sergio Vez Labrador	Elena Altuna Lopez	Manuel Garcia Roman	Egoitz Gordo Villamor
Sweden	Per Noreen	Camilla Johansson	Patrik Carlsson	Katarina Nyberg	
Switzerland	Claudio Pätz	Gioia Öchsle	Sven Michel	Alina Pätz	
Turkey	Ilhan Osmanagaoglu	Aysun Ergin	Turgul Sinasi Sahiner	Öznur Polat	Ali Osman Sahin, Seyda Zengin
Wales	Adrian Meikle	Lesley Carol	Andrew Robbins	Jane Robbins	Stewart Cairns

== Standings ==
Red Group	W	L
Scotland	7	0
Switzerland	6	1
Russia	5	2
France	4	3
Finland	3	4
Netherlands	1	6
Italy	1	6
Turkey	1	6

Blue Group	W	L
England	7	0
Austria	6	1
Slovakia	4	3
Czech Republic	4	3
Spain	4	3
Ireland	2	5
Belarus	1	6
Serbia	0	7

Green Group	W	L
Germany	5	2
Denmark	5	2
Hungary	5	2
Sweden	4	3
Latvia	3	4
Estonia	3	4
Norway	2	5
Wales	1	6

== Playoffs ==
Quarterfinals
Scotland	5
Denmark	3
Germany	8
Hungary	1
Austria	4
Switzerland	5
England	6
Russia	5

Semifinals
Scotland	8
Germany	5
Switzerland	6
England	1

Final
Scotland	6
Switzerland	2
Third place
Germany	5
England	4

2010 European Mixed Curling Championship
(Scotland)
Scotland
3rd title
