= 2014 European Junior Curling Challenge =

- Host city: Lohja, Finland
- Arena: Kisakallio Sports Institute
- Dates: January 3–8
- Men's winner: Austria
- Skip: Sebastian Wunderer
- Third: Mathias Genner
- Second: Martin Reichel
- Lead: Lukas Kirchmair
- Alternate: Philipp Nothegger
- Finalist: Netherlands (Wouter Gösgens)
- Women's winner: Italy
- Skip: Veronica Zappone
- Third: Elisa Charlotte Patono
- Second: Martina Bronsino
- Lead: Arianna Losano
- Alternate: Angela Romei
- Finalist: Hungary (Dorottya Palansca)

The 2014 European Junior Curling Challenge was held from January 3 to 8 at the Kisakallio Sports Institute in Lohja, Finland. Nations in the Europe zone that have not already qualified for the World Junior Curling Championships participated in the curling challenge. The top finishers of each tournament will advance to the 2014 World Junior Curling Championships in Flims, Switzerland.

== Men ==
=== Teams ===
Country	Skip	Third	Second	Lead	Alternate
Austria	Sebastian Wunderer	Mathias Genner	Martin Reichel	Lukas Kirchmair	Philipp Nothegger
Czech Republic	Marek Černovský	Jakub Splavec	Kryštof Krupanský	Štěpán Hron	Jan Zelingr
Denmark	Kasper Jørgensen	Nicklas Frederiksen	Simon Haubjerg	Oliver Kristoffersen	Nikolaj Mink Skau
England	Ben Fowler	Olly Kendall	Renz Bunag	Cormac Barry	
Estonia	Robert-Kent Päll	Georgi Komarov	Martin Leedo	Eduard Jakovlev	Eiko-Siim Peips
Finland	Iikko Säntti	Lauri Holopainen	Lassi Mustalahti	Eetu Leppäniemi	
Germany	Marc Muskatewitz	Daniel Rothballer	Michael Holzinger	Pirmin Schlicke	Sebastian Oswald
Hungary	Kristóf Czermann	Botond Kovács	András Balladik	Richárd Hafenscher	
Latvia	Artūrs Gerhards	Andris Bremanis	Jānis Bremanis	Rolands Rusiṇš	Armands Rusiṇš
Netherlands	Wouter Gösgens	Laurens Hoekman	Stefano Miog	Tobias van den Hurk	Joey Bruinsma
Poland	Michał Janowski	Szymon Molski	Filip Twardowski	Sławomir Białas	
Slovenia	Matevž Javornik	Gaber Bor Zelinka	Martin Rigler	Erazem Stonič	Javor Brin Zelinka
Spain	Ángel García Aguirrezábal	Mario Fernández Rodríguez	Luis Domingo de San Leandro	Eduardo de Paz Cureses	Andrés García Aguirrezábal
Turkey	Urgucan Karagoz	Melik Senol	Adem Ozdemir	Emre Karaman	Enes Taskesen

=== Round-robin standings ===
Final round-robin standings

Key
Teams to Playoffs

Group A	Skip	W	L
Austria	Sebastian Wunderer	5	1
Netherlands	Wouter Gösgens	4	2
Denmark	Kasper Jørgensen	4	2
England	Ben Fowler	3	3
Finland	Iikko Säntti	2	4
Spain	Angel García Aguirrezábal	2	4
Slovenia	Matevž Javornik	1	5

Group B	Skip	W	L
Czech Republic	Jakub Splavec	6	0
Germany	Marc Muskatewitz	5	1
Turkey	Uğurcan Karagöz	4	2
Latvia	Artūrs Gerhards	2	4
Hungary	Kristóf Czermann	2	4
Estonia	Robert-Kent Päll	2	4
Poland	Szymon Molski	0	6

=== Round-robin results ===
All draw times are listed in Eastern European Time (UTC+2).

==== Group A ====
===== Draw 1 =====
Friday, January 3, 18:30

Sheet A	1	2	3	4	5	6	7	8	Final
Netherlands (Gösgens) 🔨	2	1	0	4	2	0	X	X	9
Slovenia (Javornik)	0	0	0	0	0	1	X	X	1

Sheet C	1	2	3	4	5	6	7	8	Final
Spain (García)	0	0	0	0	0	0	1	X	1
Austria (Wunderer) 🔨	0	0	1	1	1	1	0	X	4

Sheet E	1	2	3	4	5	6	7	8	Final
England (Fowler)	0	1	0	0	0	0	0	X	1
Denmark (Jørgensen) 🔨	1	0	3	1	1	1	3	X	10

===== Draw 3 =====
Saturday, January 4, 12:30

Sheet A	1	2	3	4	5	6	7	8	Final
Spain (García) 🔨	0	1	0	0	0	0	X	X	1
Denmark (Jørgensen)	2	0	0	1	1	2	X	X	6

Sheet B	1	2	3	4	5	6	7	8	Final
Finland (Säntti)	0	2	0	1	0	1	1	X	5
Netherlands (Gösgens) 🔨	3	0	2	0	3	0	0	X	8

Sheet C	1	2	3	4	5	6	7	8	Final
Slovenia (Javornik)	0	2	0	0	0	1	0	X	3
England (Fowler) 🔨	2	0	5	3	2	0	4	X	16

===== Draw 5 =====
Saturday, January 4, 19:30

Sheet A	1	2	3	4	5	6	7	8	Final
Finland (Säntti) 🔨	2	2	0	0	1	1	0	0	6
England (Fowler)	0	0	2	1	0	0	3	1	7

Sheet B	1	2	3	4	5	6	7	8	Final
Slovenia (Javornik) 🔨	1	2	0	0	0	1	0	1	5
Spain (García)	0	0	1	1	1	0	0	0	3

Sheet D	1	2	3	4	5	6	7	8	Final
Austria (Wunderer) 🔨	0	0	0	3	0	2	0	2	7
Denmark (Jørgensen)	0	0	1	0	3	0	2	0	6

===== Draw 7 =====
Sunday, January 5, 12:45

Sheet B	1	2	3	4	5	6	7	8	Final
Austria (Wunderer) 🔨	2	0	1	0	0	3	2	X	8
England (Fowler)	0	1	0	1	1	0	0	X	3

Sheet C	1	2	3	4	5	6	7	8	Final
Denmark (Jørgensen) 🔨	1	0	0	0	2	0	1	0	4
Netherlands (Gösgens)	0	1	0	1	0	2	0	2	6

===== Draw 8 =====
Sunday, January 5, 16:00

Sheet D	1	2	3	4	5	6	7	8	Final
Finland (Säntti) 🔨	4	0	0	2	0	1	2	X	9
Slovenia (G. Zelinka)	0	2	1	0	1	0	0	X	4

===== Draw 10 =====
Monday, January 6, 9:00

Sheet A	1	2	3	4	5	6	7	8	Final
Slovenia (Javornik)	0	1	0	1	0	0	X	X	2
Austria (Wunderer) 🔨	4	0	2	0	5	1	X	X	12

Sheet D	1	2	3	4	5	6	7	8	Final
England (Fowler) 🔨	1	0	0	0	3	0	1	2	7
Netherlands (Gösgens)	0	1	2	0	0	2	0	0	5

Sheet E	1	2	3	4	5	6	7	8	Final
Spain (García)	1	0	2	0	1	0	0	0	4
Finland (Säntti) 🔨	0	1	0	1	0	1	1	3	7

===== Draw 12 =====
Monday, January 6, 16:00

Sheet A	1	2	3	4	5	6	7	8	Final
England (Fowler)	0	1	0	1	0	2	0	0	4
Spain (García) 🔨	1	0	1	0	1	0	2	2	7

Sheet B	1	2	3	4	5	6	7	8	Final
Denmark (Jørgensen)	0	1	2	1	2	0	3	X	9
Finland (Säntti) 🔨	1	0	0	0	0	1	0	X	2

Sheet E	1	2	3	4	5	6	7	8	Final
Netherlands (Gösgens)	0	0	0	0	0	0	2	1	3
Austria (Wunderer) 🔨	0	0	0	0	1	0	0	0	1

===== Draw 14 =====
Tuesday, January 7, 9:00

Sheet D	1	2	3	4	5	6	7	8	9	Final
Netherlands (Gösgens)	0	0	0	0	0	1	0	2	0	3
Spain (García) 🔨	0	1	0	0	0	0	2	0	1	4

Sheet E	1	2	3	4	5	6	7	8	Final
Denmark (Jørgensen) 🔨	1	4	0	2	1	0	5	X	13
Slovenia (Javornik)	0	0	1	0	0	3	0	X	4

===== Draw 15 =====
Tuesday, January 7, 12:30

Sheet A	1	2	3	4	5	6	7	8	Final
Austria (Wunderer) 🔨	0	3	2	2	1	0	0	X	8
Finland (Säntti)	1	0	0	0	0	1	2	X	4

==== Group B ====
===== Draw 2 =====
Saturday, January 4, 9:00

Sheet A	1	2	3	4	5	6	7	8	Final
Turkey (Karagoz)	2	0	2	3	0	2	0	X	9
Estonia (Päll)	0	0	0	0	1	0	2	X	3

Sheet C	1	2	3	4	5	6	7	8	Final
Hungary (Czermann) 🔨	0	2	0	1	0	0	0	X	3
Germany (Muskatewitz)	0	0	2	0	2	1	0	X	5

Sheet E	1	2	3	4	5	6	7	8	Final
Poland (Molski)	0	0	0	0	0	0	0	X	0
Czech Republic (Splavec) 🔨	0	0	2	1	1	0	1	X	5

===== Draw 4 =====
Saturday, January 4, 16:00

Sheet A	1	2	3	4	5	6	7	8	Final
Hungary (Czermann)	0	0	2	1	0	1	0	0	4
Czech Republic (Černovský) 🔨	1	0	0	0	1	0	2	1	5

Sheet B	1	2	3	4	5	6	7	8	Final
Latvia (Gerhards) 🔨	1	0	0	0	1	0	X	X	2
Turkey (Karagoz)	0	1	3	1	0	2	X	X	7

Sheet C	1	2	3	4	5	6	7	8	Final
Estonia (Päll)	1	2	0	0	4	0	0	0	7
Poland (Molski) 🔨	0	0	2	0	0	1	2	1	6

===== Draw 6 =====
Sunday, January 5, 9:00

Sheet A	1	2	3	4	5	6	7	8	Final
Latvia (Gerhards)	0	1	0	0	2	1	1	X	5
Poland (Molski) 🔨	0	0	1	1	0	0	0	X	2

Sheet B	1	2	3	4	5	6	7	8	Final
Estonia (Päll)	0	0	1	0	0	1	1	0	3
Hungary (Czermann) 🔨	2	1	0	1	1	0	0	1	6

Sheet D	1	2	3	4	5	6	7	8	Final
Germany (Muskatewitz) 🔨	0	0	0	2	0	2	0	X	4
Czech Republic (Splavec)	0	1	2	0	3	0	1	X	7

===== Draw 9 =====
Sunday, January 5, 19:30

Sheet B	1	2	3	4	5	6	7	8	Final
Germany (Muskatewitz) 🔨	3	3	0	2	0	1	0	X	9
Poland (Molski)	0	0	2	0	1	0	1	X	4

Sheet C	1	2	3	4	5	6	7	8	Final
Czech Republic (Splavec)	0	0	0	1	1	0	0	4	6
Turkey (Karagoz) 🔨	0	0	1	0	0	0	1	0	2

Sheet D	1	2	3	4	5	6	7	8	Final
Latvia (Gerhards) 🔨	0	0	0	0	2	0	0	X	2
Estonia (Päll)	1	0	0	0	0	2	2	X	5

===== Draw 11 =====
Monday, January 6, 12:30

Sheet A	1	2	3	4	5	6	7	8	9	Final
Estonia (Päll)	0	0	0	1	1	1	0	1	0	4
Germany (Muskatewitz) 🔨	0	2	1	0	0	0	1	0	1	5

Sheet D	1	2	3	4	5	6	7	8	Final
Poland (Molski) 🔨	0	0	0	0	1	0	1	X	2
Turkey (Karagoz)	1	2	1	0	0	1	0	X	5

Sheet E	1	2	3	4	5	6	7	8	Final
Hungary (Czermann) 🔨	0	1	1	0	1	0	0	1	4
Latvia (Gerhards)	1	0	0	1	0	2	1	0	5

===== Draw 13 =====
Monday, January 6, 19:30

Sheet A	1	2	3	4	5	6	7	8	Final
Poland (Molski) 🔨	0	1	0	0	1	0	X	X	2
Hungary (Czermann)	2	0	1	4	0	4	X	X	11

Sheet B	1	2	3	4	5	6	7	8	Final
Czech Republic (Splavec)	0	6	0	4	0	0	3	X	13
Latvia (Gerhards) 🔨	3	0	1	0	1	2	0	X	7

Sheet E	1	2	3	4	5	6	7	8	Final
Turkey (Karagoz)	1	0	2	0	2	0	0	0	5
Germany (Muskatewitz) 🔨	0	2	0	2	0	0	3	3	10

===== Draw 15 =====
Tuesday, January 7, 12:30

Sheet C	1	2	3	4	5	6	7	8	Final
Germany (Muskatewitz)	2	0	3	0	1	1	X	X	7
Latvia (Gerhards) 🔨	0	0	0	1	0	0	X	X	1

Sheet D	1	2	3	4	5	6	7	8	Final
Turkey (Karagoz) 🔨	1	0	2	3	0	2	0	X	8
Hungary (Czermann)	0	1	0	0	1	0	2	X	4

Sheet E	1	2	3	4	5	6	7	8	Final
Czech Republic (Splavec) 🔨	2	1	1	1	0	0	2	X	7
Estonia (Päll)	0	0	0	0	1	1	0	X	2

=== Playoffs ===
Quarterfinals
A1	Austria	6
B4	Latvia	1
B2	Germany	5
A3	Denmark	6
A4	England	5
B1	Czech Republic	7
A2	Netherlands	7
B3	Turkey	4

Semifinals
A1	Austria	7
A3	Denmark	1
B1	Czech Republic	4
A2	Netherlands	5

Gold Medal Game
A1	Austria	5
A2	Netherlands	4

Bronze Medal Game
A3	Czech Republic	6
B1	Denmark	3

==== Quarterfinals ====
Tuesday, January 7, 19:30

Sheet A	1	2	3	4	5	6	7	8	Final
Netherlands (Gösgens) 🔨	1	0	0	1	0	4	0	1	7
Turkey (Karagoz)	0	1	0	0	1	0	2	0	4

Sheet B	1	2	3	4	5	6	7	8	Final
England (Fowler)	0	0	0	2	3	0	0	0	5
Czech Republic (Splavec) 🔨	0	0	1	0	0	2	1	3	7

Sheet D	1	2	3	4	5	6	7	8	Final
Germany (Muskatewitz) 🔨	2	0	2	0	0	0	1	0	5
Denmark (Jørgensen)	0	2	0	1	0	2	0	1	6

Sheet E	1	2	3	4	5	6	7	8	Final
Austria (Wunderer) 🔨	2	0	0	0	3	1	X	X	6
Latvia (Gerhards)	0	0	1	0	0	0	X	X	1

==== Semifinals ====
Wednesday, January 8, 10:00

Sheet A	1	2	3	4	5	6	7	8	Final
Denmark (Jørgensen)	0	0	0	1	0	0	0	X	1
Austria (Wunderer) 🔨	0	2	1	0	1	1	2	X	7

Sheet D	1	2	3	4	5	6	7	8	Final
Netherlands (Gösgens) 🔨	1	0	2	0	0	0	2	0	5
Czech Republic (Splavec)	0	2	0	0	0	1	0	1	4

==== Bronze Medal Game ====
Wednesday, January 8, 14:30

Sheet E	1	2	3	4	5	6	7	8	Final
Czech Republic (Splavec) 🔨	1	0	0	0	2	0	3	X	6
Denmark (Jørgensen)	0	0	1	1	0	1	0	X	3

==== Gold Medal Game ====
Wednesday, January 8, 14:30

Sheet C	1	2	3	4	5	6	7	8	Final
Austria (Wunderer) 🔨	0	1	0	1	0	2	0	1	5
Netherlands (Gösgens)	0	0	2	0	1	0	1	0	4

== Women ==
=== Teams ===
Country	Skip	Third	Second	Lead	Alternate
England	Hetty Garnier	Angharad Ward	Naomi Robinson	Lucy Sparks	Niamh Fenton
Estonia	Marie Turmann	Kerli Zirk	Kerli Laidsalu	Johanna Ehatamm	Victoria-Laura Lõhmus
Finland	Miia Turto	Mira Lehtonen	Noora Suuripää	Emilia Koskinen	Iiris Koilahti
Germany	Maike Beer	Frederike Manner	Miriam Graap	Claudia Beer	Emira Abbes
Hungary	Dorottya Palansca	Ágnes Szentannai	Zsanett Gunzinám	Henrietta Miklai	Vera Kalocsai
Italy	Veronica Zappone	Elisa Charlotte Patono	Martina Bronsino	Arianna Losano	Angela Romei
Latvia	Laura Gaidule	Elizabete Laiviņa	Santa Blumberga	Madara Bremane	Helma Gerda Bidiņa
Norway	Nora Hilding	Julie Kjær Molnar	Ingvild Skaga	Stine Haalien	
Poland	Marta Pluta	Marta Malinowska	Julia Malinowska	Ewa Stych	Joanna Benet
Slovenia	Maruša Gorišek	Nina Kremžar	Špela Bizjan	Kaja Pavletič	
Spain	Iera Irazusta Manterola	Lydia Vallés Rodríguez	María Iruela Sanz	Aroa Amilibia González	Patricia Aroa-Arbués Espinosa
Turkey	Dilşat Yıldız	Semiha Konuksever	Burcak Sehitoglu	Burcu Korucu	Beyzanur Konuksever

=== Round-robin standings ===
Final round-robin standings

Key
Teams to Playoffs

Group A	Skip	W	L
Italy	Veronica Zappone	5	0
Poland	Marta Pluta	3	2
Norway	Nora Hilding	3	2
Turkey	Dilşat Yıldız	2	3
Spain	Iera Irazusta Manterola	1	4
Slovenia	Maruša Gorišek	1	4

Group B	Skip	W	L
Hungary	Dorottya Palansca	5	0
England	Hetty Garnier	4	1
Germany	Maike Beer	3	2
Estonia	Marie Turmann	2	3
Latvia	Elizabete Laiviņa	1	4
Finland	Mila Turto	0	5

=== Round-robin results ===
All draw times are listed in Eastern European Time (UTC+2).

==== Group A ====
===== Draw 1 =====
Friday, January 3, 18:30

Sheet B	1	2	3	4	5	6	7	8	9	Final
Turkey (Yıldız) 🔨	0	2	0	0	0	1	0	3	2	8
Poland (Pluta)	0	0	0	1	1	0	4	0	0	6

===== Draw 2 =====
Saturday, January 4, 9:00

Sheet B	1	2	3	4	5	6	7	8	Final
Norway (Hilding) 🔨	0	4	3	3	3	0	X	X	13
Spain (Irazusta)	1	0	0	0	0	1	X	X	2

===== Draw 4 =====
Saturday, January 4, 16:00

Sheet D	1	2	3	4	5	6	7	8	Final
Spain (Irazusta) 🔨	3	1	1	0	0	3	0	3	11
Slovenia (Gorišek)	0	0	0	2	2	0	3	0	7

Sheet E	1	2	3	4	5	6	7	8	Final
Poland (Pluta)	2	1	0	2	0	1	1	X	7
Norway (Hilding) 🔨	0	0	2	0	1	0	0	X	3

===== Draw 5 =====
Saturday, January 4, 19:30

Sheet C	1	2	3	4	5	6	7	8	Final
Turkey (Yıldız) 🔨	2	2	0	1	0	0	0	X	5
Italy (Zappone)	0	0	1	0	3	3	2	X	9

===== Draw 7 =====
Sunday, January 5, 12:45

Sheet A	1	2	3	4	5	6	7	8	Final
Slovenia (Gorišek)	0	1	0	1	1	0	X	X	3
Poland (Pluta) 🔨	4	0	2	0	0	3	X	X	9

Sheet D	1	2	3	4	5	6	7	8	Final
Norway (Hilding)	1	1	0	3	0	1	0	X	6
Turkey (Yıldız) 🔨	0	0	2	0	0	0	2	X	4

Sheet E	1	2	3	4	5	6	7	8	Final
Spain (Irazusta)	0	1	1	0	0	2	0	X	4
Italy (Zappone) 🔨	2	0	0	0	2	0	3	X	7

===== Draw 9 =====
Sunday, January 5, 19:30

Sheet A	1	2	3	4	5	6	7	8	Final
Italy (Zappone)	0	4	1	0	1	0	3	X	9
Norway (Hilding) 🔨	0	0	0	1	0	2	0	X	3

Sheet E	1	2	3	4	5	6	7	8	Final
Slovenia (Gorišek)	0	1	3	1	0	2	1	X	8
Turkey (Yıldız) 🔨	2	0	0	0	1	0	0	X	3

===== Draw 10 =====
Monday, January 6, 9:00

Sheet C	1	2	3	4	5	6	7	8	Final
Poland (Pluta)	3	1	0	0	0	0	3	2	9
Spain (Irazusta) 🔨	0	0	3	1	1	1	0	0	6

===== Draw 12 =====
Monday, January 6, 16:00

Sheet C	1	2	3	4	5	6	7	8	Final
Norway (Hilding) 🔨	4	3	0	4	0	1	X	X	12
Slovenia (Gorišek)	0	0	2	0	1	0	X	X	3

Sheet D	1	2	3	4	5	6	7	8	Final
Italy (Zappone) 🔨	3	0	0	3	0	1	1	X	8
Poland (Pluta)	0	0	0	0	1	0	0	X	1

===== Draw 14 =====
Tuesday, January 7, 9:00

Sheet A	1	2	3	4	5	6	7	8	Final
Turkey (Yıldız) 🔨	0	0	1	2	2	2	X	X	7
Spain (Irazusta)	0	0	0	0	0	0	X	X	0

Sheet B	1	2	3	4	5	6	7	8	Final
Slovenia (Gorišek)	0	0	0	0	0	2	X	X	2
Italy (Zappone) 🔨	3	3	2	3	3	0	X	X	14

==== Group B ====
===== Draw 1 =====
Friday, January 3, 18:30

Sheet D	1	2	3	4	5	6	7	8	Final
Estonia (Turmann) 🔨	0	0	0	0	0	2	1	3	6
Latvia (Gaidule)	2	1	0	1	1	0	0	0	5

===== Draw 2 =====
Saturday, January 4, 9:00

Sheet D	1	2	3	4	5	6	7	8	Final
Finland (Turto) 🔨	0	1	0	0	0	0	X	X	1
Germany (Beer)	2	0	4	3	2	2	X	X	13

===== Draw 3 =====
Saturday, January 4, 12:30

Sheet D	Final
England (Garnier)	L
Hungary (Palansca)	W

Win by forfeit

===== Draw 5 =====
Saturday, January 4, 19:30

Sheet E	1	2	3	4	5	6	7	8	Final
Germany (Beer) 🔨	1	0	1	0	1	0	0	0	3
England (Garnier)	0	1	0	1	0	1	0	1	4

===== Draw 6 =====
Sunday, January 5, 9:00

Sheet C	1	2	3	4	5	6	7	8	Final
Finland (Turto) 🔨	0	2	0	1	1	0	2	0	6
Latvia (Laiviņa)	1	0	1	0	0	3	0	2	7

Sheet E	1	2	3	4	5	6	7	8	Final
Estonia (Turmann)	0	0	0	0	1	0	1	X	2
Hungary (Palansca) 🔨	1	0	1	2	0	3	0	X	7

===== Draw 8 =====
Sunday, January 5, 16:00

Sheet A	1	2	3	4	5	6	7	8	Final
Finland (Turto)	0	0	0	0	0	1	X	X	1
Estonia (Turmann) 🔨	4	3	2	0	4	0	X	X	13

Sheet B	1	2	3	4	5	6	7	8	Final
England (Garnier) 🔨	1	2	0	0	3	1	0	X	7
Latvia (Gaidule)	0	0	1	1	0	0	0	X	2

Sheet C	1	2	3	4	5	6	7	8	Final
Hungary (Palansca)	0	1	0	1	1	0	1	X	4
Germany (Beer) 🔨	0	0	1	0	0	1	0	X	2

===== Draw 10 =====
Monday, January 6, 9:00

Sheet B	1	2	3	4	5	6	7	8	Final
Hungary (Palansca) 🔨	1	1	0	2	3	2	0	X	9
Finland (Turto)	0	0	1	0	0	0	1	X	2

===== Draw 11 =====
Monday, January 6, 12:30

Sheet B	1	2	3	4	5	6	7	8	Final
Latvia (Gaidule) 🔨	1	2	0	0	0	0	0	0	3
Germany (Beer)	0	0	1	1	1	0	0	2	5

Sheet C	1	2	3	4	5	6	7	8	Final
Estonia (Turmann) 🔨	0	0	0	3	0	0	1	0	4
England (Garnier)	0	0	1	0	2	2	0	1	6

===== Draw 13 =====
Monday, January 6, 19:30

Sheet C	1	2	3	4	5	6	7	8	Final
Latvia (Gaidule)	0	1	0	3	0	2	1	0	7
Hungary (Palansca) 🔨	2	0	2	0	1	0	0	3	8

Sheet D	1	2	3	4	5	6	7	8	Final
Germany (Beer) 🔨	1	1	0	2	0	1	0	2	7
Estonia (Turmann)	0	0	1	0	1	0	2	0	4

===== Draw 14 =====
Tuesday, January 7, 9:00

Sheet C	1	2	3	4	5	6	7	8	Final
England (Garnier) 🔨	6	1	2	1	1	2	X	X	13
Finland (Turto)	0	0	0	0	0	0	X	X	0

=== Playoffs ===
Quarterfinals
B2	England	8
A3	Norway	2
A1	Italy	4
B4	Estonia	3
A2	Poland	4
B3	Germany	3
A4	Turkey	5
B1	Hungary	6

Semifinals
B2	England	2
A1	Italy	9
A2	Poland	8
B1	Hungary	9

Gold Medal Game
A1	Italy	8
B1	Hungary	3

Bronze Medal Game
B2	England	7
A2	Poland	6

==== Quarterfinals ====
Tuesday, January 7, 16:00

Sheet B	1	2	3	4	5	6	7	8	Final
England (Garnier) 🔨	0	2	2	0	1	0	3	X	8
Norway (Hilding)	0	0	0	1	0	1	0	X	2

Sheet A	1	2	3	4	5	6	7	8	9	Final
Italy (Zappone)	0	0	0	0	1	1	0	1	1	4
Estonia (Turmann) 🔨	0	1	0	1	0	0	1	0	0	3

Sheet C	1	2	3	4	5	6	7	8	Final
Poland (Pluta) 🔨	0	1	0	0	2	0	0	1	4
Germany (Beer)	0	0	1	0	0	2	0	0	3

Sheet E	1	2	3	4	5	6	7	8	Final
Turkey (Yıldız) 🔨	2	0	0	1	0	1	0	1	5
Hungary (Palansca)	0	1	1	0	2	0	2	0	6

==== Semifinals ====
Wednesday, January 8, 10:00

Sheet E	1	2	3	4	5	6	7	8	Final
England (Garnier)	0	0	0	0	1	0	1	X	2
Italy (Zappone) 🔨	3	1	2	2	0	1	0	X	9

Sheet B	1	2	3	4	5	6	7	8	Final
Poland (Pluta) 🔨	4	0	0	2	0	1	1	0	8
Hungary (Palansca)	0	3	1	0	2	0	0	3	9

==== Bronze Medal Game ====
Wednesday, January 8, 14:30

Sheet A	1	2	3	4	5	6	7	8	9	Final
Poland (Pluta)	0	1	0	2	0	3	0	0	0	6
England (Garnier) 🔨	1	0	1	0	2	0	1	1	1	7

==== Gold Medal Game ====
Wednesday, January 8, 14:30

Sheet D	1	2	3	4	5	6	7	8	Final
Italy (Zappone) 🔨	0	1	0	1	4	0	2	X	8
Hungary (Palansca)	0	0	1	0	0	2	0	X	3
