= 2017 European Curling Championships =

- Host city: St Gallen, Switzerland
- Arena: Eissportzentrum Lerchenfeld
- Dates: November 17–25
- Men's winner: Sweden
- Skip: Niklas Edin
- Third: Oskar Eriksson
- Second: Rasmus Wranå
- Lead: Christoffer Sundgren
- Alternate: Henrik Leek
- Finalist: Scotland (Kyle Smith)
- Women's winner: Scotland
- Skip: Eve Muirhead
- Third: Anna Sloan
- Second: Vicki Adams
- Lead: Lauren Gray
- Alternate: Kelly Schafer
- Finalist: Sweden (Anna Hasselborg)

The 2017 European Curling Championships was held from November 17 to 25 in St Gallen, Switzerland. The Group C competitions was held in May in Andorra.

At the conclusion of the championships, the top eight women's teams will go to the 2018 Ford World Women's Curling Championship in North Bay, Ontario, and the top eight men's teams will go to the 2018 World Men's Curling Championship in Las Vegas, United States.

== Men ==
=== Group A ===
The Group A competitions will be contested at the Eissportzentrum Lerchenfeld in St. Gallen.

==== Teams ====
A Division Teams

Austria	Germany	Italy	Netherlands	Norway
Skip: Sebastian Wunderer; Third: Mathias Genner; Second: Martin Reichel; Lead: Philipp Nothegger; Alternate: Markus Forejtek	Skip: Alexander Baumann; Third: Manuel Walter; Second: Daniel Herberg; Lead: Ryan Sherrard; Alternate: Sebastian Schweizer	Skip: Joël Retornaz; Third: Amos Mosaner; Second: Daniele Ferrazza; Lead: Andrea Pilzer; Alternate: Simone Gonin	Skip: Jaap van Dorp; Third: Wouter Gösgens; Second: Laurens Hoekman; Lead: Carlo Glasbergen; Alternate: Alexander Magan	Skip: Thomas Ulsrud; Third: Torger Nergård; Second: Christoffer Svae; Lead: Håvard Vad Petersson; Alternate: Sander Rølvåg
Russia	Scotland	Slovakia	Sweden	Switzerland
Skip: Alexey Timofeev; Third: Sergey Glukhov; Second: Artur Razhabov; Lead: Evgeny Klimov; Alternate: Artem Shmakov	Skip: Kyle Smith; Third: Thomas Muirhead; Second: Kyle Waddell; Lead: Cammy Smith; Alternate: Glen Muirhead	Fourth: David Misun; Third: Patrik Kapralik; Skip: Juraj Gallo; Lead: Jakub Polak; Alternate: Frantisek Pitonak	Skip: Niklas Edin; Third: Oskar Eriksson; Second: Rasmus Wranå; Lead: Christoffer Sundgren; Alternate: Henrik Leek	Fourth: Benoît Schwarz; Third: Claudio Pätz; Skip: Peter de Cruz; Lead: Valentin Tanner; Alternate: Dominik Märki

==== Round-robin standings ====
Final round-robin standings

Key
Teams to Playoffs
Teams Relegated to 2018 Group B

Country	Skip	W	L	PF	PA	Ends Won	Ends Lost	Blank Ends	Stolen Ends	Shot Pct.
Sweden	Niklas Edin	8	1	77	42	43	26	7	17	87%
Switzerland	Peter de Cruz	8	1	69	40	41	28	5	14	85%
Scotland	Kyle Smith	6	3	52	39	31	27	23	5	87%
Norway	Thomas Ulsrud	6	3	65	46	40	35	11	6	84%
Germany	Alexander Baumann	5	4	47	50	32	34	15	7	81%
Netherlands	Jaap van Dorp	4	5	52	48	36	33	14	10	84%
Russia	Alexey Timofeev	4	5	57	54	34	32	12	9	79%
Italy	Joël Retornaz	2	7	44	64	28	42	8	3	79%
Austria	Sebastian Wunderer	1	8	39	70	26	37	11	1	77%
Slovakia	Juraj Gallo	1	8	27	76	21	38	15	3	73%

==== Round-robin results ====
===== Draw 1 =====
November 18, 9:00

Sheet A	1	2	3	4	5	6	7	8	9	10	Final
Norway (Ulsrud)	0	2	1	0	4	0	4	X	X	X	11
Russia (Timofeev)	1	0	0	1	0	1	0	X	X	X	3

Sheet B	1	2	3	4	5	6	7	8	9	10	Final
Sweden (Edin)	2	1	0	1	0	1	0	2	3	X	10
Austria (Wunderer)	0	0	2	0	3	0	1	0	0	X	6

Sheet C	1	2	3	4	5	6	7	8	9	10	Final
Germany (Baumann)	2	0	0	0	0	1	0	0	0	1	4
Slovakia (Gallo)	0	0	0	0	1	0	1	0	0	0	2

Sheet D	1	2	3	4	5	6	7	8	9	10	Final
Scotland (Smith)	0	2	0	1	2	1	0	1	0	X	7
Italy (Retornaz)	0	0	2	0	0	0	1	0	0	X	3

Sheet E	1	2	3	4	5	6	7	8	9	10	Final
Switzerland (de Cruz)	2	0	2	1	1	1	0	1	X	X	8
Netherlands (van Dorp)	0	1	0	0	0	0	2	0	X	X	3

===== Draw 3 =====
November 18, 19:30

Sheet A	1	2	3	4	5	6	7	8	9	10	Final
Austria (Wunderer)	0	0	0	1	0	1	0	1	X	X	3
Scotland (Smith)	0	3	0	0	2	0	2	0	X	X	7

Sheet B	1	2	3	4	5	6	7	8	9	10	Final
Russia (Timofeev)	3	0	0	2	0	1	1	1	X	X	8
Italy (Retornaz)	0	2	0	0	0	0	0	0	X	X	2

Sheet C	1	2	3	4	5	6	7	8	9	10	Final
Switzerland (de Cruz)	1	0	2	1	0	1	0	2	0	1	8
Norway (Ulsrud)	0	2	0	0	2	0	1	0	1	0	6

Sheet D	1	2	3	4	5	6	7	8	9	10	Final
Netherlands (van Dorp)	2	1	3	4	0	1	1	0	X	X	12
Slovakia (Gallo)	0	0	0	0	1	0	0	0	X	X	1

Sheet E	1	2	3	4	5	6	7	8	9	10	Final
Sweden (Edin)	2	1	0	2	1	0	2	X	X	X	8
Germany (Baumann)	0	0	1	0	0	1	0	X	X	X	2

===== Draw 5 =====
November 19, 13:00

Sheet A	1	2	3	4	5	6	7	8	9	10	Final
Slovakia (Gallo)	0	1	0	0	0	0	X	X	X	X	1
Sweden (Edin)	2	0	3	2	4	1	X	X	X	X	12

Sheet B	1	2	3	4	5	6	7	8	9	10	Final
Norway (Ulsrud)	0	2	0	0	2	0	0	0	2	0	6
Netherlands (van Dorp)	0	0	1	0	0	1	0	0	0	1	3

Sheet C	1	2	3	4	5	6	7	8	9	10	Final
Russia (Timofeev)	0	1	0	1	0	1	0	0	0	X	3
Scotland (Smith)	0	0	1	0	2	0	2	0	0	X	5

Sheet D	1	2	3	4	5	6	7	8	9	10	Final
Germany (Baumann)	2	0	0	0	1	0	1	0	0	X	4
Switzerland (de Cruz)	0	1	1	3	0	1	0	2	1	X	9

Sheet E	1	2	3	4	5	6	7	8	9	10	Final
Austria (Wunderer)	0	0	1	0	0	1	X	X	X	X	2
Italy (Retornaz)	2	2	0	0	4	0	X	X	X	X	8

===== Draw 7 =====
November 20, 8:00

Sheet A	1	2	3	4	5	6	7	8	9	10	Final
Italy (Retornaz)	0	1	0	0	0	1	X	X	X	X	2
Switzerland (de Cruz)	2	0	2	4	0	0	X	X	X	X	8

Sheet B	1	2	3	4	5	6	7	8	9	10	Final
Germany (Baumann)	1	1	0	1	0	1	0	2	0	X	6
Scotland (Smith)	0	0	0	0	2	0	2	0	0	X	4

Sheet C	1	2	3	4	5	6	7	8	9	10	Final
Netherlands (van Dorp)	0	0	3	1	0	1	0	3	X	X	8
Austria (Wunderer)	0	0	0	0	2	0	1	0	X	X	3

Sheet D	1	2	3	4	5	6	7	8	9	10	Final
Slovakia (Gallo)	0	0	0	1	0	0	1	0	0	X	2
Norway (Ulsrud)	2	0	1	0	2	0	0	1	1	X	7

Sheet E	1	2	3	4	5	6	7	8	9	10	11	Final
Russia (Timofeev)	4	0	0	0	0	1	0	2	0	1	0	8
Sweden (Edin)	0	2	2	1	0	0	2	0	1	0	2	10

===== Draw 9 =====
November 20, 16:00

Sheet A	1	2	3	4	5	6	7	8	9	10	Final
Germany (Baumann)	0	2	0	0	2	0	0	2	2	X	8
Austria (Wunderer)	1	0	0	1	0	1	0	0	0	X	3

Sheet B	1	2	3	4	5	6	7	8	9	10	Final
Switzerland (de Cruz)	1	0	0	2	0	2	0	1	1	X	7
Russia (Timofeev)	0	2	0	0	2	0	1	0	0	X	5

Sheet C	1	2	3	4	5	6	7	8	9	10	Final
Norway (Ulsrud)	1	0	2	0	1	0	2	1	0	1	8
Italy (Retornaz)	0	2	0	1	0	1	0	0	1	0	5

Sheet D	1	2	3	4	5	6	7	8	9	10	Final
Sweden (Edin)	0	2	0	1	0	1	1	0	0	X	5
Netherlands (van Dorp)	2	0	2	0	2	0	0	1	2	X	9

Sheet E	1	2	3	4	5	6	7	8	9	10	Final
Scotland (Smith)	2	3	2	0	1	0	X	X	X	X	8
Slovakia (Gallo)	0	0	0	0	0	1	X	X	X	X	1

===== Draw 11 =====
November 21, 9:00

Sheet A	1	2	3	4	5	6	7	8	9	10	Final
Switzerland (de Cruz)	2	0	0	0	4	0	2	2	X	X	10
Slovakia (Gallo)	0	0	1	0	0	2	0	0	X	X	3

Sheet B	1	2	3	4	5	6	7	8	9	10	Final
Austria (Wunderer)	0	0	1	0	1	1	0	0	1	0	4
Norway (Ulsrud)	2	1	0	2	0	0	0	1	0	1	7

Sheet C	1	2	3	4	5	6	7	8	9	10	Final
Scotland (Smith)	0	0	2	0	0	0	0	0	2	0	4
Sweden (Edin)	2	0	0	0	0	0	1	2	0	0	5

Sheet D	1	2	3	4	5	6	7	8	9	10	Final
Italy (Retornaz)	1	0	0	2	0	3	1	0	4	X	11
Germany (Baumann)	0	1	0	0	3	0	0	2	0	X	6

Sheet E	1	2	3	4	5	6	7	8	9	10	Final
Netherlands (van Dorp)	0	1	0	1	0	2	0	0	0	X	4
Russia (Timofeev)	1	0	2	0	2	0	0	2	2	X	9

===== Draw 13 =====
November 21, 19:00

Sheet A	1	2	3	4	5	6	7	8	9	10	Final
Sweden (Edin)	2	1	1	0	0	2	0	1	3	X	10
Italy (Retornaz)	0	0	0	0	1	0	2	0	0	X	3

Sheet B	1	2	3	4	5	6	7	8	9	10	Final
Netherlands (van Dorp)	1	0	0	0	1	1	0	1	0	1	5
Germany (Baumann)	0	1	0	1	0	0	2	0	2	0	6

Sheet C	1	2	3	4	5	6	7	8	9	10	Final
Slovakia (Gallo)	0	1	0	0	1	1	0	0	1	0	4
Russia (Timofeev)	0	0	2	0	0	0	4	1	0	2	9

Sheet D	1	2	3	4	5	6	7	8	9	10	Final
Switzerland (de Cruz)	0	1	0	2	0	1	3	0	1	X	8
Austria (Wunderer)	1	0	1	0	1	0	0	2	0	X	5

Sheet E	1	2	3	4	5	6	7	8	9	10	11	Final
Norway (Ulsrud)	0	0	1	0	0	2	0	2	0	2	0	7
Scotland (Smith)	2	0	0	2	0	0	1	0	2	0	1	8

===== Draw 15 =====
November 22, 14:00

Sheet A	1	2	3	4	5	6	7	8	9	10	Final
Russia (Timofeev)	0	1	0	1	0	0	0	0	X	X	2
Germany (Baumann)	0	0	2	0	0	2	1	2	X	X	7

Sheet B	1	2	3	4	5	6	7	8	9	10	Final
Scotland (Smith)	1	0	0	1	0	1	0	1	0	X	4
Switzerland (de Cruz)	0	0	1	0	3	0	2	0	3	X	9

Sheet C	1	2	3	4	5	6	7	8	9	10	11	Final
Italy (Retornaz)	0	1	0	1	0	1	0	0	1	1	0	5
Netherlands (van Dorp)	1	0	1	0	1	0	1	1	0	0	1	6

Sheet D	1	2	3	4	5	6	7	8	9	10	Final
Norway (Ulsrud)	0	1	0	2	1	0	2	0	1	X	7
Sweden (Edin)	4	0	1	0	0	2	0	2	0	X	9

Sheet E	1	2	3	4	5	6	7	8	9	10	Final
Slovakia (Gallo)	0	0	0	1	0	0	3	0	X	X	4
Austria (Wunderer)	0	0	4	0	0	4	0	1	X	X	9

===== Draw 17 =====
November 23, 9:00

Sheet A	1	2	3	4	5	6	7	8	9	10	Final
Scotland (Smith)	0	1	0	2	0	0	0	0	0	2	5
Netherlands (van Dorp)	0	0	1	0	1	0	0	0	0	0	2

Sheet B	1	2	3	4	5	6	7	8	9	10	Final
Italy (Retornaz)	0	1	0	2	0	1	0	1	0	0	5
Slovakia (Gallo)	3	0	1	0	2	0	1	0	1	1	9

Sheet C	1	2	3	4	5	6	7	8	9	10	Final
Sweden (Edin)	0	1	1	1	5	0	X	X	X	X	8
Switzerland (de Cruz)	1	0	0	0	0	1	X	X	X	X	2

Sheet D	1	2	3	4	5	6	7	8	9	10	Final
Austria (Wunderer)	0	1	0	3	0	0	0	X	X	X	4
Russia (Timofeev)	2	0	3	0	2	1	2	X	X	X	10

Sheet E	1	2	3	4	5	6	7	8	9	10	Final
Germany (Baumann)	0	1	1	0	1	0	0	1	0	0	4
Norway (Ulsrud)	2	0	0	2	0	1	0	0	0	1	6

==== World Challenge Games ====
The World Challenge Games are a best-of-three series held between the eighth-ranked team in the Group A round robin and the winner of the Group B tournament to determine which of these two teams will play at the World Championships.

===== Game 1 =====
Friday, November 24, 19:00

Team	1	2	3	4	5	6	7	8	9	10	Final
Italy (Retornaz)	1	1	1	1	0	0	2	0	X	X	6
Finland (Kauste)	0	0	0	0	0	0	0	2	X	X	2

===== Game 2 =====
Saturday, November 25, 9:00

Team	1	2	3	4	5	6	7	8	9	10	Final
Italy (Retornaz)	0	3	1	0	0	0	3	0	X	X	7
Finland (Kauste)	0	0	0	0	0	1	0	1	X	X	2

==== Playoffs ====
Semifinals
1	Sweden	8
4	Norway	3
2	Switzerland	8
3	Scotland	9

Final
1	Sweden	10
3	Scotland	5

Bronze-medal game
2	Switzerland	6
4	Norway	5

===== Semifinals =====
Thursday, November 23, 19:00

Team	1	2	3	4	5	6	7	8	9	10	Final
Sweden (Edin)	2	0	2	0	1	1	0	1	1	X	8
Norway (Ulsrud)	0	0	0	1	0	0	2	0	0	X	3

Player percentages
Sweden		Norway	
Christoffer Sundgren	93%	Håvard Vad Petersson	88%
Rasmus Wranå	87%	Christoffer Svae	82%
Oskar Eriksson	93%	Torger Nergård	86%
Niklas Edin	88%	Thomas Ulsrud	74%
Total	90%	Total	83%

Team	1	2	3	4	5	6	7	8	9	10	Final
Switzerland (de Cruz)	0	0	2	0	3	0	2	1	0	0	8
Scotland (Smith)	0	3	0	2	0	2	0	0	0	2	9

Player percentages
Switzerland		Scotland	
Valentin Tanner	89%	Cammy Smith	86%
Peter de Cruz	76%	Kyle Waddell	84%
Claudio Pätz	75%	Thomas Muirhead	86%
Benoît Schwarz	73%	Kyle Smith	75%
Total	78%	Total	83%

===== Bronze-medal game =====
Friday, November 24, 19:00

Team	1	2	3	4	5	6	7	8	9	10	Final
Switzerland (de Cruz)	1	0	0	1	2	0	2	0	0	0	6
Norway (Ulsrud)	0	1	1	0	0	1	0	0	1	1	5

Player percentages
Switzerland		Norway	
Valentin Tanner	85%	Håvard Vad Petersson	90%
Peter de Cruz	96%	Christoffer Svae	90%
Claudio Pätz	96%	Torger Nergård	60%
Benoît Schwarz	84%	Thomas Ulsrud	79%
Total	90%	Total	80%

===== Gold-medal game =====
Saturday, November 25, 15:00

Team	1	2	3	4	5	6	7	8	9	10	Final
Sweden (Edin)	2	0	1	0	0	0	1	0	2	4	10
Scotland (Smith)	0	0	0	2	1	0	0	2	0	0	5

Player percentages
Sweden		Scotland	
Christoffer Sundgren	80%	Cammy Smith	94%
Rasmus Wranå	89%	Kyle Waddell	90%
Oskar Eriksson	85%	Thomas Muirhead	86%
Niklas Edin	81%	Kyle Smith	81%
Total	84%	Total	88%

==== Player percentages ====
Round Robin only

Leads	%
(Sweden) Christoffer Sundgren	91
(Scotland) Cammy Smith	91
(Switzerland) Valentin Tanner	88
(Netherlands) Carlo Glasbergen	86
(Russia) Evgeny Klimov	85

Seconds	%
(Netherlands) Laurens Hoekman	88
(Switzerland) Peter de Cruz	87
(Sweden) Rasmus Wranå	86
(Scotland) Kyle Waddell	86
(Italy) Andrea Pilzer	85

Thirds	%
(Sweden) Oskar Eriksson	88
(Scotland) Thomas Muirhead	86
(Norway) Torger Nergård	85
(Switzerland) Claudio Pätz	84
(Netherlands) Wouter Goesgens	81

Skips/Fourths	%
(Scotland) Kyle Smith	85
(Norway) Thomas Ulsrud	85
(Sweden) Niklas Edin	82
(Switzerland) Benoit Schwarz	81
(Germany) Alexander Baumann	79

=== Group B ===
==== Round-robin standings ====
Final round-robin standings

Key
Teams to Playoffs
Teams to Relegation Playoff

Pool A	Skip	W	L
Spain	Sergio Vez	6	1
Finland	Aku Kauste	6	1
Israel	Kevin Golberg	5	2
Latvia	Kārlis Smilga	5	2
England	Andrew Woolston	2	5
Hungary	Gabor Riesz	2	5
Belgium	Timothy Verreycken	2	5
Estonia	Harri Lill	0	7

Pool B	Skip	W	L
Czech Republic	Jiří Snítil	7	0
Poland	Borys Jasiecki	6	1
Turkey	Uğurcan Karagöz	5	2
France	Eddy Mercier	4	3
Lithuania	Tadas Vyskupaitis	2	5
Wales	James Pougher	2	5
Slovenia	Štefan Sever	1	6
Denmark	Torkil Svensgaard	1	6

==== Relegation round ====
Relegation Finals
A7	Belgium	5
A8	Estonia	6

Relegation Semifinals
A7	Belgium	6
B7	Slovenia	10
A8	Estonia	7
B8	Denmark	6

==== Playoffs ====
Quarterfinals
B2	Poland	5
A3	Israel	4
A2	Finland	9
B3	Turkey	4

Semifinals
A1	Spain	7
B2	Poland	10
B1	Czech Republic	6
A2	Finland	9

Final
B2	Poland	3
A2	Finland	8

Bronze-medal game
A1	Spain	4
B1	Czech Republic	8

===== Quarterfinals =====
Thursday, November 23, 18:00

Sheet L	1	2	3	4	5	6	7	8	9	10	Final
Poland (Jasiecki)	1	0	0	2	0	0	1	0	0	1	5
Israel (Golberg)	0	1	1	0	0	0	0	1	1	0	4

Sheet G	1	2	3	4	5	6	7	8	9	10	Final
Finland (Kauste)	0	2	0	4	1	0	1	0	1	X	9
Turkey (Karagoz)	0	0	1	0	0	1	0	2	0	X	4

===== Semifinals =====
Friday, November 24, 8:00

Sheet H	1	2	3	4	5	6	7	8	9	10	Final
Spain (Vez)	2	0	0	1	0	0	2	0	2	X	7
Poland (Jasiecki)	0	0	4	0	3	1	0	2	0	X	10

Sheet L	1	2	3	4	5	6	7	8	9	10	Final
Czech Republic (Snítil)	1	0	1	0	1	0	2	0	1	X	6
Finland (Kauste)	0	3	0	2	0	1	0	3	0	X	9

===== Bronze-medal game =====
Friday, November 24, 13:00

Team	1	2	3	4	5	6	7	8	9	10	Final
Spain (Vez)	0	1	0	1	0	1	0	1	X	X	4
Czech Republic (Snítil)	1	0	2	0	3	0	2	0	X	X	8

===== Gold-medal game =====
Friday, November 24, 13:00

Team	1	2	3	4	5	6	7	8	9	10	Final
Poland (Jasiecki)	0	0	0	0	0	1	0	2	X	X	3
Finland (Kauste)	2	1	0	1	1	0	3	0	X	X	8

=== Group C ===
==== Teams ====
Andorra	Belarus	Bulgaria	Croatia	France
Skip: Josep Garcia; Third: Oscar Zazo; Second: Josep Duro; Lead: Cesar Mialdea; Alternate: Josep Caubet	Skip: Dimtriy Barkan; Third: Pavel Petrov; Second: Andrei Yurkevich; Lead: Mikalai Kryshtopa; Alternate: Yauheni Klevets	Skip: Reto Seiler; Third: Bojidar Momerin; Second: Nikolay Runtov; Lead: Petar Tchakarov; Alternate: Stanko Velinov	Skip: Alen Cadez; Third: Drazen Cutic; Second: Robert Mikulandric; Lead: Ognjen Golubic; Alternate: Mislav Martinic	Skip: Thierry Mercier; Third: Theo Ducroz; Second: Eddy Mercier; Lead: Killian Gaudin; Alternate: Quentin Morard
Ireland	Luxembourg	Romania	Serbia	Spain
Skip: James Russell; Third: John Furey; Second: Craig Whyte; Lead: Arran Cameron; Alternate: Eoin McCrossan	Skip: Yannick Hansen; Third: Francesco Grassi; Second: Ian Munn; Lead: Fabio Veltri	Skip: Cristian Matau; Third: Stefan Bodea; Second: Valentin Anghelinei; Lead: Adrian Dobos; Alternate: Thomas Sandu	Skip: Djordje Neskovic; Third: Filip Stojanovic; Second: Goran Ungurovic; Lead: Marko Stojanovic	Skip: Sergio Vez; Third: Mikel Unanue; Second: Antonio de Mollinedo; Lead: Eduardo de Paz; Alternate: Angel Garcia

==== Men's Round-robin standings ====
Key
Teams to Playoffs

Country	Skip	W	L
Spain	Sergio Vez	8	1
Ireland	James Russell	8	1
France	Therry Mercier	6	3
Belarus	Dimitry Barkan	6	3
Bulgaria	Reto Seiler	5	4
Croatia	Alen Cadez	4	5
Serbia	Dorde Neskovic	3	6
Romania	Cristian Matau	3	6
Andorra	Josep Garcia	2	7
Luxembourg	Did Not Attend	0	9

- Luxembourg withdrew before competition started

==== Playoffs ====
Second Place Game
2	Ireland	6
3	France	7

Semifinals
1	Spain	7
2	Ireland	5
3	France	8
4	Belarus	4

===== 1 vs. 2 =====
Team	1	2	3	4	5	6	7	8	9	10	11	Final
Spain (Vez)	1	0	2	1	0	0	0	1	0	0	2	7
Ireland (Russell)	0	1	0	0	0	0	0	0	3	1	0	5

Winner advances to Group B competitions.
Loser advances to Second Place Game.

===== 3 vs. 4 =====
Team	1	2	3	4	5	6	7	8	9	10	Final
France (Mercier)	0	1	0	1	0	0	0	5	1	X	8
Belarus (Barkan)	1	0	1	0	0	0	2	0	0	X	4

Winner advances to Second Place Game.

===== Second Place Game =====
Team	1	2	3	4	5	6	7	8	9	10	Final
Ireland (Russell)	0	1	0	2	0	0	1	0	2	0	6
France (Mercier)	0	0	1	0	0	2	0	2	0	2	7

Winner advances to Group B competitions.

== Women ==
=== Group A ===
The Group A competitions will be contested at the Eissportzentrum Lerchenfeld in St Gallen.

==== Teams ====
A Division Teams

Czech Republic	Denmark	Germany	Hungary	Italy
Skip: Anna Kubešková; Third: Alžběta Baudyšová; Second: Tereza Pliskova; Lead: Klára Svatoňová; Alternate: Ezhen Kolchevskaia	Skip: Madeleine Dupont; Third: Denise Dupont; Second: Julie Høgh; Lead: Mathilde Halse; Alternate: Lina Knudsen	Skip: Daniela Jentsch; Third: Josephine Obermann; Second: Analena Jentsch; Lead: Pia-Lisa Schöll; Alternate: Emira Abbes	Skip: Dorottya Palancsa; Third: Henrietta Miklai; Second: Nikolett Sándor; Lead: Vera Kalocsai; Alternate: Dorottya Micheller	Skip: Diana Gaspari; Third: Veronica Zappone; Second: Chiara Olivieri; Lead: Angela Romei; Alternate: Stefania Constantini
Russia	Scotland	Switzerland	Sweden	Turkey
Skip: Anna Sidorova; Third: Margarita Fomina; Second: Alexandra Raeva; Lead: Nkeirouka Ezekh; Alternate: Alina Kovaleva	Skip: Eve Muirhead; Third: Anna Sloan; Second: Vicki Adams; Lead: Lauren Gray; Alternate: Kelly Schafer	Skip: Silvana Tirinzoni; Third: Manuela Siegrist; Second: Esther Neuenschwander; Lead: Marlene Albrecht; Alternate: Jenny Perret	Skip: Anna Hasselborg; Third: Sara McManus; Second: Agnes Knochenhauer; Lead: Sofia Mabergs; Alternate: Jennie Wåhlin	Skip: Dilşat Yıldız; Third: Öznur Polat; Second: Semiha Konuksever; Lead: Ayşe Gözütok

==== Round-robin standings ====
Final round-robin standings

Key
Teams to Playoffs
Teams relegated to 2017 Group B

Country	Skip	W	L	PF	PA	Ends Won	Ends Lost	Blank Ends	Stolen Ends	Shot Pct.
Sweden	Anna Hasselborg	9	0	73	24	37	21	12	11	89%
Switzerland	Silvana Tirinzoni	7	2	70	52	43	37	8	8	83%
Scotland	Eve Muirhead	7	2	64	38	39	28	12	11	87%
Italy	Diana Gaspari	5	4	51	62	34	37	9	6	79%
Russia	Anna Sidorova	4	5	66	48	42	34	9	10	84%
Germany	Daniela Jentsch	3	6	61	67	34	38	9	6	79%
Czech Republic	Anna Kubešková	3	6	46	62	35	37	10	7	77%
Denmark	Madeleine Dupont	3	6	40	70	29	37	10	8	74%
Turkey	Dilşat Yıldız	2	7	52	66	30	42	11	4	74%
Hungary	Dorottya Palancsa	2	7	47	81	32	44	3	4	74%

==== Round-robin results ====
===== Draw 2 =====
November 18, 14:00

Sheet A	1	2	3	4	5	6	7	8	9	10	Final
Italy (Gaspari)	0	3	0	1	0	0	1	0	1	X	6
Czech Republic (Kubešková)	0	0	1	0	0	1	0	1	0	X	3

Sheet B	1	2	3	4	5	6	7	8	9	10	Final
Denmark (Dupont)	0	1	1	0	0	0	1	1	0	X	4
Switzerland (Tirinzoni)	2	0	0	2	2	1	0	0	2	X	9

Sheet C	1	2	3	4	5	6	7	8	9	10	Final
Sweden (Hasselborg)	0	0	0	0	3	0	1	0	1	X	5
Scotland (Muirhead)	0	0	0	0	0	1	0	1	0	X	2

Sheet D	1	2	3	4	5	6	7	8	9	10	11	Final
Germany (Jentsch)	2	0	2	0	0	2	0	2	0	2	0	10
Hungary (Palansca)	0	1	0	3	3	0	1	0	2	0	2	12

Sheet E	1	2	3	4	5	6	7	8	9	10	Final
Turkey (Yıldız)	0	1	0	0	1	0	3	0	1	1	7
Russia (Sidorova)	1	0	0	2	0	2	0	1	0	0	6

===== Draw 4 =====
November 19, 9:00

Sheet A	1	2	3	4	5	6	7	8	9	10	Final
Switzerland (Tirinzoni)	0	0	1	1	3	0	0	1	0	2	8
Germany (Jentsch)	0	2	0	0	0	2	0	0	1	0	5

Sheet B	1	2	3	4	5	6	7	8	9	10	Final
Czech Republic (Kubešková)	1	0	1	1	2	0	2	0	0	0	7
Hungary (Palansca)	0	4	0	0	0	2	0	1	0	1	8

Sheet C	1	2	3	4	5	6	7	8	9	10	Final
Turkey (Yıldız)	0	1	0	4	1	0	0	0	0	X	6
Italy (Gaspari)	1	0	2	0	0	1	3	1	1	X	9

Sheet D	1	2	3	4	5	6	7	8	9	10	11	Final
Russia (Sidorova)	0	2	1	0	0	0	1	2	0	1	0	7
Scotland (Muirhead)	2	0	0	2	1	0	0	0	2	0	1	8

Sheet E	1	2	3	4	5	6	7	8	9	10	Final
Denmark (Dupont)	0	0	1	0	0	0	X	X	X	X	1
Sweden (Hasselborg)	2	2	0	3	0	1	X	X	X	X	8

===== Draw 6 =====
November 19, 19:00

Sheet A	1	2	3	4	5	6	7	8	9	10	Final
Scotland (Muirhead)	2	0	1	0	0	1	1	1	X	X	6
Denmark (Dupont)	0	0	0	0	1	0	0	0	X	X	1

Sheet B	1	2	3	4	5	6	7	8	9	10	Final
Italy (Gaspari)	0	3	0	1	0	1	0	1	0	3	9
Russia (Sidorova)	1	0	2	0	2	0	1	0	2	0	8

Sheet C	1	2	3	4	5	6	7	8	9	10	Final
Czech Republic (Kubešková)	0	0	2	3	0	1	0	2	1	X	9
Germany (Jentsch)	0	1	0	0	2	0	2	0	0	X	5

Sheet D	1	2	3	4	5	6	7	8	9	10	Final
Sweden (Hasselborg)	1	1	0	0	2	2	1	0	X	X	7
Turkey (Yıldız)	0	0	1	0	0	0	0	0	X	X	1

Sheet E	1	2	3	4	5	6	7	8	9	10	Final
Switzerland (Tirinzoni)	0	2	2	0	1	0	0	2	0	1	8
Hungary (Palancsa)	2	0	0	1	0	1	0	0	2	0	6

===== Draw 8 =====
November 20, 12:00

Sheet A	1	2	3	4	5	6	7	8	9	10	Final
Hungary (Palancsa)	0	1	0	1	0	3	0	X	X	X	5
Turkey (Yıldız)	1	0	4	0	2	0	5	X	X	X	12

Sheet B	1	2	3	4	5	6	7	8	9	10	Final
Sweden (Hasselborg)	0	0	2	3	3	0	X	X	X	X	8
Germany (Jentsch)	1	0	0	0	0	1	X	X	X	X	2

Sheet C	1	2	3	4	5	6	7	8	9	10	Final
Russia (Sidorova)	1	0	1	0	2	0	2	0	1	0	7
Switzerland (Tirinzoni)	0	1	0	2	0	1	0	3	0	1	8

Sheet D	1	2	3	4	5	6	7	8	9	10	Final
Scotland (Muirhead)	2	0	3	0	2	1	X	X	X	X	8
Italy (Gaspari)	0	0	0	1	0	0	X	X	X	X	1

Sheet E	1	2	3	4	5	6	7	8	9	10	Final
Czech Republic (Kubešková)	0	1	0	0	0	1	0	1	0	X	3
Denmark (Dupont)	0	0	0	1	2	0	1	0	2	X	6

===== Draw 10 =====
November 20, 20:00

Sheet A	1	2	3	4	5	6	7	8	9	10	Final
Sweden (Hasselborg)	0	1	0	1	0	2	0	1	0	3	8
Switzerland (Tirinzoni)	0	0	2	0	1	0	1	0	2	0	6

Sheet B	1	2	3	4	5	6	7	8	9	10	11	Final
Turkey (Yıldız)	0	2	0	1	0	2	0	2	0	0	0	7
Czech Republic (Kubešková)	1	0	3	0	1	0	0	0	1	1	1	8

Sheet C	1	2	3	4	5	6	7	8	9	10	Final
Italy (Gaspari)	0	1	0	2	1	0	3	0	1	X	8
Hungary (Palancsa)	1	0	2	0	0	1	0	1	0	X	5

Sheet D	1	2	3	4	5	6	7	8	9	10	Final
Denmark (Dupont)	0	0	0	1	0	1	X	X	X	X	2
Russia (Sidorova)	2	3	1	0	6	0	X	X	X	X	12

Sheet E	1	2	3	4	5	6	7	8	9	10	Final
Germany (Jentsch)	0	0	0	1	1	0	1	0	2	X	5
Scotland (Muirhead)	2	1	3	0	0	1	0	1	0	X	8

===== Draw 12 =====
November 21, 14:00

Sheet A	1	2	3	4	5	6	7	8	9	10	Final
Turkey (Yıldız)	0	0	0	1	0	0	2	0	0	X	3
Scotland (Muirhead)	0	0	2	0	2	0	0	2	2	X	8

Sheet B	1	2	3	4	5	6	7	8	9	10	Final
Switzerland (Tirinzoni)	0	1	0	1	1	0	4	0	0	2	9
Italy (Gaspari)	0	0	3	0	0	2	0	1	0	0	6

Sheet C	1	2	3	4	5	6	7	8	9	10	Final
Germany (Jentsch)	3	0	3	0	5	0	4	X	X	X	15
Denmark (Dupont)	0	2	0	2	0	3	0	X	X	X	7

Sheet D	1	2	3	4	5	6	7	8	9	10	Final
Hungary (Palancsa)	0	0	0	0	1	0	X	X	X	X	1
Sweden (Hasselborg)	2	2	4	3	0	2	X	X	X	X	13

Sheet E	1	2	3	4	5	6	7	8	9	10	Final
Russia (Sidorova)	0	2	1	0	2	1	1	1	X	X	8
Czech Republic (Kubešková)	1	0	0	1	0	0	0	0	X	X	2

===== Draw 14 =====
November 22, 9:00

Sheet A	1	2	3	4	5	6	7	8	9	10	Final
Denmark (Dupont)	1	1	1	0	0	2	0	1	0	X	6
Hungary (Palancsa)	0	0	0	1	1	0	1	0	1	X	4

Sheet B	1	2	3	4	5	6	7	8	9	10	Final
Russia (Sidorova)	0	1	0	1	1	0	1	0	1	0	5
Sweden (Hasselborg)	0	0	2	0	0	1	0	2	0	1	6

Sheet C	1	2	3	4	5	6	7	8	9	10	Final
Scotland (Muirhead)	3	0	2	1	0	0	2	0	X	X	8
Czech Republic (Kubešková)	0	2	0	0	1	0	0	1	X	X	4

Sheet D	1	2	3	4	5	6	7	8	9	10	Final
Turkey (Yıldız)	0	0	1	0	1	0	1	0	X	X	3
Switzerland (Tirinzoni)	0	2	0	2	0	3	0	1	X	X	8

Sheet E	1	2	3	4	5	6	7	8	9	10	Final
Italy (Gaspari)	0	0	1	0	1	0	0	2	0	X	4
Germany (Jentsch)	2	2	0	1	0	1	1	0	2	X	9

===== Draw 16 =====
November 22, 19:00

Sheet A	1	2	3	4	5	6	7	8	9	10	Final
Czech Republic (Kubešková)	0	1	0	0	2	0	0	1	X	X	4
Sweden (Hasselborg)	2	0	3	3	0	0	1	0	X	X	9

Sheet B	1	2	3	4	5	6	7	8	9	10	Final
Germany (Jentsch)	0	2	0	2	0	1	0	2	0	0	7
Turkey (Yıldız)	1	0	0	0	1	0	1	0	2	1	6

Sheet C	1	2	3	4	5	6	7	8	9	10	Final
Hungary (Palancsa)	0	1	0	0	0	1	0	1	0	X	3
Russia (Sidorova)	1	0	2	0	1	0	2	0	2	X	8

Sheet D	1	2	3	4	5	6	7	8	9	10	11	Final
Italy (Gaspari)	0	2	0	0	0	0	1	0	1	1	1	6
Denmark (Dupont)	1	0	2	0	0	0	0	2	0	0	0	5

Sheet E	1	2	3	4	5	6	7	8	9	10	11	Final
Scotland (Muirhead)	1	0	1	0	0	2	0	2	0	1	0	7
Switzerland (Tirinzoni)	0	1	0	1	1	0	2	0	2	0	2	9

===== Draw 18 =====
November 23, 14:00

Sheet A	1	2	3	4	5	6	7	8	9	10	Final
Germany (Jentsch)	0	1	0	0	0	1	0	1	0	0	3
Russia (Sidorova)	0	0	0	0	2	0	2	0	0	1	5

Sheet B	1	2	3	4	5	6	7	8	9	10	Final
Hungary (Palancsa)	0	1	0	0	1	0	1	0	X	X	3
Scotland (Muirhead)	1	0	1	1	0	2	0	4	X	X	9

Sheet C	1	2	3	4	5	6	7	8	9	10	11	Final
Denmark (Dupont)	0	1	0	1	0	3	1	0	0	1	1	8
Turkey (Yıldız)	2	0	2	0	3	0	0	0	0	0	0	7

Sheet D	1	2	3	4	5	6	7	8	9	10	Final
Switzerland (Tirinzoni)	0	0	1	1	0	0	2	0	1	0	5
Czech Republic (Kubešková)	0	1	0	0	1	1	0	1	0	2	6

Sheet E	1	2	3	4	5	6	7	8	9	10	Final
Sweden (Hasselborg)	1	0	0	2	0	2	4	X	X	X	9
Italy (Gaspari)	0	1	0	0	1	0	0	X	X	X	2

==== World Challenge Games ====
The World Challenge Games are a best-of-three series held between the eighth-ranked team in the Group A round robin and the winner of the Group B tournament to determine which of these two teams will play at the World Championships.

===== Game 1 =====
Friday, November 24, 19:00

Team	1	2	3	4	5	6	7	8	9	10	Final
Denmark (Dupont)	2	0	1	0	2	0	0	1	1	1	8
Finland (Kauste)	0	1	0	1	0	3	0	0	0	0	5

===== Game 2 =====
Saturday, November 25, 9:00

Team	1	2	3	4	5	6	7	8	9	10	Final
Denmark (Dupont)	0	0	2	0	2	0	2	0	0	X	6
Finland (Kauste)	2	2	0	1	0	3	0	0	1	X	9

===== Game 3 =====
Saturday, November 25, 14:00

Team	1	2	3	4	5	6	7	8	9	10	Final
Denmark (Dupont)	1	0	3	0	2	0	0	1	0	1	8
Finland (Kauste)	0	4	0	0	0	1	0	0	2	0	7

==== Playoffs ====
Semifinals
1	Sweden	7
4	Italy	3
2	Switzerland	5
3	Scotland	7

Final
1	Sweden	3
3	Scotland	6

Bronze-medal game
2	Switzerland	6
4	Italy	7

===== Semifinals =====
Friday, November 24, 14:00

Team	1	2	3	4	5	6	7	8	9	10	Final
Sweden (Hasselborg)	2	0	0	0	1	0	3	0	1	X	7
Italy (Gaspari)	0	1	0	0	0	1	0	1	0	X	3

Player percentages
Sweden		Italy	
Sofia Mabergs	86%	Angela Romei	74%
Agnes Knochenhauer	96%	Chiara Olivieri	80%
Sara McManus	86%	Veronica Zappone	87%
Anna Hasselborg	85%	Diana Gaspari	64%
Total	88%	Total	76%

Team	1	2	3	4	5	6	7	8	9	10	Final
Switzerland (Tirinzoni)	0	0	0	3	0	1	0	1	0	0	5
Scotland (Muirhead)	0	0	2	0	0	0	1	0	3	1	7

Player percentages
Switzerland		Scotland	
Marlene Albrecht	74%	Lauren Gray	79%
Esther Neuenschwander	79%	Vicki Adams	80%
Manuela Siegrist	63%	Anna Sloan	86%
Silvana Tirinzoni	64%	Eve Muirhead	70%
Total	70%	Total	76%

===== Bronze-medal game =====
Friday, November 24, 19:00

Team	1	2	3	4	5	6	7	8	9	10	Final
Switzerland (Tirinzoni)	3	0	0	1	0	0	0	0	2	0	6
Italy (Gaspari)	0	2	0	0	1	0	0	3	0	1	7

Player percentages
Italy		Switzerland	
Angela Romei	83%	Marlene Albrecht	84%
Chiara Olivieri	85%	Esther Neuenschwander	83%
Veronica Zappone	88%	Manuela Siegrist	90%
Diana Gaspari	68%	Silvana Tirinzoni	85%
Total	81%	Total	86%

===== Gold-medal game =====
Saturday, November 25, 10:00

Team	1	2	3	4	5	6	7	8	9	10	Final
Sweden (Hasselborg)	1	0	1	0	0	0	1	0	0	0	3
Scotland (Muirhead)	0	1	0	0	0	2	0	1	1	1	6

Player percentages
Sweden		Scotland	
Sofia Mabergs	89%	Lauren Gray	90%
Agnes Knochenhauer	85%	Vicki Adams	64%
Sara McManus	79%	Anna Sloan	75%
Anna Hasselborg	70%	Eve Muirhead	86%
Total	81%	Total	79%

==== Player percentages ====
Round Robin only

Leads	%
(Switzerland) Marlene Albrecht	88
(Sweden) Sofia Mabergs	87
(Scotland) Lauren Gray	86
(Germany) Pia-Lisa Schöll	86
(Czech Republic) Klara Svatonova	84

Seconds	%
(Scotland) Vicki Adams	89
(Sweden) Agnes Knochenhauer	88
(Switzerland) Esther Neuenschwander	84
(Russia) Alexandra Raeva	83
(Italy) Chiara Olivieri	80

Thirds	%
(Sweden) Sara McManus	90
(Scotland) Anna Sloan	87
(Russia) Margarita Fomina	87
(Italy) Veronica Zappone	81
(Switzerland) Manuela Siegrist	79

Skips/Fourths	%
(Sweden) Anna Hasselborg	88
(Scotland) Eve Muirhead	86
(Switzerland) Silvana Tirinzoni	81
(Russia) Anna Sidorova	81
(Italy) Diana Gaspari	79

=== Group B ===
==== Teams ====
Belarus	England	Estonia	Finland	Latvia
Skip: Alina Pauliuchyk; Third: Susanna Ivashyna; Second: Aryna Sviarzhynskaya; Lead: Marharyta Dziashuk; Alternate: Natallia Sviarzhynskaya	Skip: Lisa Farnell; Third: Sara Jahodova; Second: Victoria Kyle; Lead: Niamh Fenton	Skip: Marie Turmann; Third: Kerli Laidsalu; Second: Heili Grossmann; Lead: Erika Tuvike; Alternate: Victoria-Laura Lõhmus	Skip: Oona Kauste; Third: Eszter Juhasz; Second: Maija Salmiovirta; Lead: Jenni Rasanen; Alternate: Lotta Immonen	Skip: Iveta Staša-Šaršūne; Third: Ieva Krusta; Second: Santa Blumberga; Lead: Evelina Barone; Alternate: Madara Bremane
Lithuania	Netherlands	Norway	Poland	Spain
Skip: Virginija Paulauskaitė; Third: Olga Dvojeglazova; Second: Asta Vaicekonyte; Lead: Grazina Eututiene; Alternate: Lina Januleviciute	Skip: Marianne Neeleman; Third: Ester Romijn; Second: Linda Kreijns; Lead: Bonnie Nilhamn	Skip: Kristin Skaslien; Third: Ingvild Skaga; Second: Pia Trulsen; Lead: Jenn Cunningham; Alternate: Maia Ramsfjell	Skip: Marta Szeliga-Frynia; Third: Adela Walczak; Second: Barbara Karwat; Lead: Maria Stefanska; Alternate: Zuzanna Rybicka	Skip: Oihane Otaegi; Third: Leire Otaegi; Second: Asuncion Manterola; Lead: Patricia Ruiz; Alternate: Estrella Labrador

==== Round-robin standings ====
Final round-robin standings

Key
Teams to Playoffs
Teams relegated to 2017 Group C

Country	Skip	W	L
Norway	Kristin Skaslien	8	1
Estonia	Marie Turmann	7	2
Latvia	Iveta Staša-Šaršūne	6	3
Finland	Oona Kauste	5	4
England	Lisa Farnell	4	5
Spain	Oihane Otaegi	4	5
Lithuania	Virginija Paulauskaitė	3	6
Netherlands	Marianne Neeleman	3	6
Poland	Marta Szeliga-Frynia	3	6
Belarus	Alina Pavlyuchik	2	7

==== Round-robin results ====
===== Draw 1 =====
Saturday, November 18, 14:00

Sheet F	1	2	3	4	5	6	7	8	9	10	Final
Belarus (Pauliuchyk)	2	0	1	0	2	0	2	0	0	X	7
Norway (Ramsfjell)	0	1	0	3	0	3	0	4	1	X	12

Sheet G	1	2	3	4	5	6	7	8	9	10	Final
England (Farnell)	0	1	1	0	0	0	2	0	1	0	5
Latvia (Staša-Šaršūne)	1	0	0	1	1	1	0	1	0	1	6

Sheet H	1	2	3	4	5	6	7	8	9	10	Final
Estonia (Turmann)	0	0	1	0	1	2	0	0	0	2	6
Poland (Szeliga-Frynia)	1	2	0	1	0	0	0	0	1	0	5

Sheet J	1	2	3	4	5	6	7	8	9	10	Final
Spain (Otaegi)	0	1	1	0	0	1	0	4	0	X	7
Lithuania (Paulauskaitė)	0	0	0	1	0	0	2	0	0	X	3

Sheet K	1	2	3	4	5	6	7	8	9	10	Final
Finland (Kauste)	1	0	2	0	2	0	0	2	0	X	7
Netherlands (Neeleman)	0	1	0	1	0	0	0	0	1	X	3

===== Draw 2 =====
Sunday, November 19, 8:00

Sheet F	1	2	3	4	5	6	7	8	9	10	Final
Latvia (Staša-Šaršūne)	0	1	0	1	1	0	2	0	1	1	7
Spain (Otaegi)	2	0	2	0	0	1	0	1	0	0	6

Sheet G	1	2	3	4	5	6	7	8	9	10	Final
Norway (Ramsfjell)	0	1	2	0	0	0	2	0	3	X	8
Lithuania (Paulauskaitė)	0	0	0	1	0	2	0	1	0	X	4

Sheet H	1	2	3	4	5	6	7	8	9	10	Final
Finland (Kauste)	3	0	2	0	0	0	2	0	4	X	11
Belarus (Pauliuchyk)	0	1	0	1	2	1	0	1	0	X	6

Sheet J	1	2	3	4	5	6	7	8	9	10	Final
Netherlands (Neeleman)	0	1	2	2	2	1	0	3	X	X	11
Poland (Szeliga-Frynia)	0	0	0	0	0	0	3	0	X	X	3

Sheet K	1	2	3	4	5	6	7	8	9	10	Final
England (Farnell)	0	0	0	1	0	2	0	2	0	X	5
Estonia (Turmann)	0	0	0	0	2	0	2	0	4	X	8

===== Draw 3 =====
Sunday, November 19, 16:00

Sheet F	1	2	3	4	5	6	7	8	9	10	Final
Poland (Szeliga-Frynia)	1	0	0	0	0	0	0	X	X	X	1
England (Farnell)	0	2	2	1	3	1	1	X	X	X	10

Sheet G	1	2	3	4	5	6	7	8	9	10	Final
Belarus (Pauliuchyk)	0	0	0	2	0	2	1	0	0	X	5
Netherlands (Neeleman)	3	2	2	0	1	0	0	1	1	X	10

Sheet H	1	2	3	4	5	6	7	8	9	10	Final
Norway (Skaslien)	2	0	0	2	0	2	1	0	3	X	10
Spain (Otaegi)	0	0	2	0	1	0	0	3	0	X	6

Sheet J	1	2	3	4	5	6	7	8	9	10	Final
Estonia (Turmann)	1	0	1	0	0	2	2	0	3	X	9
Finland (Kauste)	0	3	0	0	0	0	0	1	0	X	4

Sheet K	1	2	3	4	5	6	7	8	9	10	Final
Latvia (Staša-Šaršūne)	3	0	2	1	2	2	X	X	X	X	10
Lithuania (Paulauskaitė)	0	1	0	0	0	0	X	X	X	X	1

===== Draw 4 =====
Monday, November 20, 8:00

Sheet F	1	2	3	4	5	6	7	8	9	10	Final
Lithuania (Paulauskaitė)	0	1	0	1	0	0	0	2	2	0	6
Finland (Kauste)	1	0	2	0	1	0	1	0	0	2	7

Sheet G	1	2	3	4	5	6	7	8	9	10	Final
Estonia (Turmann)	1	2	1	0	2	0	0	2	X	X	8
Spain (Otaegi)	0	0	0	1	0	1	0	0	X	X	2

Sheet H	1	2	3	4	5	6	7	8	9	10	Final
Netherlands (Neeleman)	2	0	0	1	0	1	0	0	0	X	4
Latvia (Staša-Šaršūne)	0	3	1	0	2	0	1	2	2	X	11

Sheet J	1	2	3	4	5	6	7	8	9	10	Final
Poland (Szeliga-Frynia)	1	0	1	0	1	0	1	0	0	2	6
Belarus (Pauliuchyk)	0	0	0	1	0	1	0	1	1	0	4

Sheet K	1	2	3	4	5	6	7	8	9	10	Final
Norway (Skaslien)	1	0	2	0	0	2	0	0	2	1	8
England (Farnell)	0	1	0	1	1	0	0	1	0	0	4

===== Draw 5 =====
Monday, November 21, 16:00

Sheet F	1	2	3	4	5	6	7	8	9	10	Final
Estonia (Turmann)	0	1	0	0	0	1	1	0	1	0	4
Latvia (Staša-Šaršūne)	1	0	1	0	1	0	0	2	0	1	6

Sheet G	1	2	3	4	5	6	7	8	9	10	Final
Finland (Kauste)	0	2	0	2	4	0	1	X	X	X	9
Norway (Skaslien)	0	0	1	0	0	1	0	X	X	X	2

Sheet J	1	2	3	4	5	6	7	8	9	10	11	Final
Belarus (Pauliuchyk)	0	0	0	3	0	1	0	3	0	1	0	8
Lithuania (Paulauskaitė)	2	2	0	0	1	0	1	0	2	0	3	11

Sheet K	1	2	3	4	5	6	7	8	9	10	11	Final
England (Farnell)	0	2	1	0	0	1	0	1	0	1	0	6
Netherlands (Neeleman)	1	0	0	1	2	0	1	0	1	0	1	7

Sheet L	1	2	3	4	5	6	7	8	9	10	Final
Spain (Otaegi)	0	0	1	0	2	2	0	1	2	1	9
Poland (Szeliga-Frynia)	3	0	0	1	0	0	3	0	0	0	7

===== Draw 6 =====
Tuesday, November 21, 12:00 & Thursday November 23, 12:00

Sheet F	1	2	3	4	5	6	7	8	9	10	Final
Finland (Kauste)	2	0	1	0	2	0	0	0	2	0	7
Poland (Szeliga-Frynia)	0	1	0	1	0	1	2	2	0	1	8

Sheet G	1	2	3	4	5	6	7	8	9	10	Final
Latvia (Staša-Šaršūne)	0	1	1	1	0	1	0	1	1	0	6
Belarus (Pauliuchyk)	3	0	0	0	1	0	3	0	0	1	8

Sheet H	1	2	3	4	5	6	7	8	9	10	Final
Spain (Otaegi)	0	1	0	0	1	0	0	0	X	X	2
England (Farnell)	2	0	0	2	0	2	1	1	X	X	8

Sheet F	1	2	3	4	5	6	7	8	9	10	Final
Lithuania (Paulauskaitė)	0	0	0	0	0	0	0	X	X	X	0
Estonia (Turmann)	1	0	2	1	0	1	3	X	X	X	8

Sheet K	1	2	3	4	5	6	7	8	9	10	Final
Netherlands (Neeleman)	2	0	1	0	0	2	0	1	0	X	6
Norway (Skaslien)	0	1	0	1	3	0	1	0	2	X	8

===== Draw 7 =====
Tuesday, November 21, 20:00

Sheet F	1	2	3	4	5	6	7	8	9	10	Final
England (Farnell)	0	0	0	2	3	1	0	0	0	3	9
Lithuania (Paulauskaitė)	2	0	1	0	0	0	0	3	0	0	6

Sheet G	1	2	3	4	5	6	7	8	9	10	Final
Netherlands (Neeleman)	0	0	1	0	0	1	0	1	0	X	3
Estonia (Turmann)	0	0	0	0	2	0	2	0	2	X	6

Sheet H	1	2	3	4	5	6	7	8	9	10	Final
Poland (Szeliga-Frynia)	0	0	0	1	1	0	X	X	X	X	2
Norway (Skaslien)	3	1	4	0	0	3	X	X	X	X	11

Sheet J	1	2	3	4	5	6	7	8	9	10	Final
Finland (Kauste)	0	0	2	1	1	0	0	0	X	X	4
Latvia (Staša-Šaršūne)	3	1	0	0	0	3	1	3	X	X	11

Sheet K	1	2	3	4	5	6	7	8	9	10	Final
Belarus (Pauliuchyk)	1	0	0	1	0	0	1	0	X	X	3
Spain (Otaegi)	0	2	1	0	2	1	0	3	X	X	9

===== Draw 8 =====
Wednesday, November 22, 12:00

Sheet F	1	2	3	4	5	6	7	8	9	10	Final
Norway (Skaslien)	3	0	0	1	0	3	0	0	2	2	11
Estonia (Turmann)	0	0	3	0	2	0	1	1	0	0	7

Sheet G	1	2	3	4	5	6	7	8	9	10	Final
Spain (Otaegi)	0	1	0	2	1	0	0	0	2	X	6
Finland (Kauste)	3	0	1	0	0	2	2	1	0	X	9

Sheet H	1	2	3	4	5	6	7	8	9	10	11	Final
Lithuania (Paulauskaitė)	0	2	0	0	1	0	0	1	0	1	1	6
Netherlands (Neeleman)	0	0	2	0	0	1	1	0	1	0	0	5

Sheet J	1	2	3	4	5	6	7	8	9	10	Final
Belarus (Pauliuchyk)	0	0	1	1	1	0	0	3	1	X	7
England (Farnell)	2	0	0	0	0	1	1	0	0	X	4

Sheet K	1	2	3	4	5	6	7	8	9	10	Final
Poland (Szeliga-Frynia)	2	0	1	1	2	1	0	0	0	1	8
Latvia (Staša-Šaršūne)	0	2	0	0	0	0	2	1	1	0	6

===== Draw 9 =====
Wednesday, November 22, 20:00

Sheet F	1	2	3	4	5	6	7	8	9	10	Final
Spain (Otaegi)	0	0	1	0	3	0	0	2	2	X	8
Netherlands (Neeleman)	0	0	0	1	0	2	1	0	0	X	4

Sheet G	1	2	3	4	5	6	7	8	9	10	Final
Lithuania (Paulauskaitė)	0	0	0	1	0	0	3	2	0	1	7
Poland (Szeliga-Frynia)	0	0	1	0	1	0	0	0	3	0	5

Sheet H	1	2	3	4	5	6	7	8	9	10	Final
England (Farnell)	2	0	3	0	0	0	2	0	1	X	8
Finland (Kauste)	0	1	0	1	2	1	0	1	0	X	6

Sheet J	1	2	3	4	5	6	7	8	9	10	Final
Latvia (Staša-Šaršūne)	0	1	0	1	0	1	1	0	3	0	7
Norway (Skaslien)	1	0	2	0	2	0	0	1	0	2	8

Sheet K	1	2	3	4	5	6	7	8	9	10	Final
Estonia (Turmann)	0	2	0	0	0	3	0	2	0	1	8
Belarus (Pauliuchyk)	2	0	2	1	0	0	1	0	0	0	6

==== Playoffs ====
Semifinals
1	Norway	6
4	Finland	7
2	Estonia	7
3	Latvia	10

Final
4	Finland	8
3	Latvia	7

Bronze-medal game
1	Norway	4
2	Estonia	5

===== Semifinals =====
Thursday, November 23, 18:00

Sheet B	1	2	3	4	5	6	7	8	9	10	11	Final
Norway (Skaslien)	0	0	0	1	0	2	0	1	0	2	0	6
Finland (Kauste)	0	1	1	0	3	0	1	0	0	0	1	7

Sheet A	1	2	3	4	5	6	7	8	9	10	Final
Estonia (Turmann)	0	0	2	0	1	0	1	0	3	X	7
Latvia (Staša-Šaršūne)	2	1	0	4	0	1	0	2	0	X	10

===== Bronze-medal game =====
Friday, November 24, 13:30

Team	1	2	3	4	5	6	7	8	9	10	11	Final
Norway (Skaslien)	0	0	2	0	0	0	1	0	1	0	0	4
Estonia (Turmann)	0	1	0	0	0	1	0	1	0	1	1	5

===== Gold-medal game =====
Friday, November 24, 13:30

Team	1	2	3	4	5	6	7	8	9	10	Final
Finland (Kauste)	2	0	0	5	0	0	0	0	0	1	8
Latvia (Staša-Šaršūne)	0	0	1	0	3	1	1	0	1	0	7

=== Group C ===
==== Teams ====
Austria	Croatia	Ireland	Poland
Skip: Hannah Augustin; Third: Marijke Reitsma; Second: Madelaine Reiner; Lead: Johanna Hoess; Alternate: Jill Witscher	Skip: Iva Penava; Third: Iva Roso; Second: Anita Sajfar; Lead: Antonia Maricevic	Skip: Ailsa Anderson; Third: Katie Kerr; Second: Jen Ward; Lead: Jacqueline Barr	Skip: Marta Szeliga-Frynia; Third: Adela Walczak; Second: Zuzanna Rybicka; Lead: Maria Stefańska; Alternate: Barbara Karwat
Romania	Slovenia	Slovakia	Spain
Skip: Iulia Ioana Traila; Third: Valentina Crina Boboc; Second: Octavia Maria Traila; Lead: Ana-Maria Saracu	Fourth: Nadja Pipan; Skip: Ajda Zavrtanik Drglin; Second: Marusa Gorisek; Lead: Lea Tehovnik	Skip: Daniela Matulova; Third: Slavka Zubercova; Second: Sona Mayerova; Lead: Nina Mayerova; Alternate: Zuzana Kohaniova	Skip: Oihane Otaegi; Third: Leire Otaegi; Second: Aitana Saenz; Lead: Asuncion Manterola; Alternate: Estrella Labrador

==== Women's Round-robin standings ====
Key
Teams to Playoffs

Country	Skip	W	L
Poland	Marta Szeliga-Frynia	7	0
Spain	Oihane Otaegi	5	2
Slovakia	Danela Matulova	5	2
Ireland	Alisa Anderson	3	4
Slovenia	Ajda Zarvartik Drglin	3	4
Croatia	Iva Penava	3	4
Austria	Hannah Augustin	2	5
Romania	Iulia Ioana Traila	0	7

==== Playoffs ====
Second Place Game
1	Poland	6
3	Slovakia	4

Semifinals
1	Poland	9
2	Spain	10
3	Slovakia	11
4	Ireland	3

===== 1 vs. 2 =====
Team	1	2	3	4	5	6	7	8	9	10	11	Final
Poland (Szeliga-Frynia)	2	0	1	0	2	0	2	0	1	1	0	9
Spain (Otaegi)	0	3	0	1	0	3	0	2	0	0	1	10

Winner advances to Group B competitions.
Loser advances to Second Place Game.

===== 3 vs. 4 =====
Team	1	2	3	4	5	6	7	8	9	10	Final
Slovakia (Matulova)	1	1	0	2	0	2	0	2	3	X	11
Ireland (Anderson)	0	0	1	0	1	0	1	0	0	X	3

Winner advances to Second Place Game.

===== Second Place Game =====
Team	1	2	3	4	5	6	7	8	9	10	Final
Poland (Szeliga-Frynia)	1	0	3	0	0	1	0	0	1	X	6
Slovakia (Matulova)	0	1	0	1	1	0	0	1	0	X	4

Winner advances to Group B competitions.
