= List of World Mixed Doubles Curling Champions =

The following is a list of the winners of the World Mixed Doubles Curling Championship since the inception of the championship in 2008. Doubles is a discipline of curling in which a team of two competes with six stones, instead of the traditional team of four with eight stones. Mixed doubles specifies that the team consist of one man and one woman.

== Medalists ==
Name of female curler, then male curler listed in team member list.

World Mixed Doubles Curling Champions
Year	Gold		Silver		Bronze	
Year	Country	Team	Country	Team	Country	Team
2008	Switzerland	Irene Schori; Toni Müller	Finland	Anne Malmi; Jussi Uusipaavalniemi	Sweden	Marie Persson; Göran Carlsson
2009	Switzerland	Irene Schori; Toni Müller	Hungary	Ildikó Szekeres; György Nagy	Canada	Allison Nimik; Sean Grassie
2010	Russia	Yana Nekrasova; Petr Dron	New Zealand	Bridget Becker; Sean Becker	China	Sun Yue; Zhang Zhipeng
2011	Switzerland	Alina Pätz; Sven Michel	Russia	Alina Kovaleva; Alexey Tselousov	France	Pauline Jeanneret; Amaury Pernette
2012	Switzerland	Nadine Lehmann; Martin Rios	Sweden	Camilla Johansson; Per Noréen	Austria	Claudia Toth; Christian Roth
2013	Hungary	Dorottya Palancsa; Zsolt Kiss	Sweden	Elisabeth Norredahl; Fredrik Hallström	Czech Republic	Zuzana Hájková; Tomáš Paul
2014	Switzerland	Michelle Gribi; Reto Gribi	Sweden	Camilla Johansson; Per Noréen	Spain	Irantzu García; Sergio Vez
2015	Hungary	Dorottya Palancsa; Zsolt Kiss	Sweden	Camilla Johansson; Per Noréen	Norway	Kristin Skaslien; Magnus Nedregotten
2016	Russia	Anastasia Bryzgalova; Alexander Krushelnitskiy	China	Wang Rui; Ba Dexin	United States	Tabitha Peterson; Joe Polo
2017	Switzerland	Jenny Perret; Martin Rios	Canada	Joanne Courtney; Reid Carruthers	China	Wang Rui; Ba Dexin
2018	Switzerland	Michèle Jäggi; Sven Michel	Russia	Maria Komarova; Daniil Goriachev	Canada	Laura Crocker; Kirk Muyres
2019	Sweden	Anna Hasselborg; Oskar Eriksson	Canada	Jocelyn Peterman; Brett Gallant	United States	Cory Christensen; John Shuster
2020	Cancelled					
2021	Scotland	Jennifer Dodds; Bruce Mouat	Norway	Kristin Skaslien; Magnus Nedregotten	Sweden	Almida de Val; Oskar Eriksson
2022	Scotland	Eve Muirhead; Bobby Lammie	Switzerland	Alina Pätz; Sven Michel	Germany	Pia-Lisa Schöll; Klaudius Harsch
2023	United States	Cory Thiesse; Korey Dropkin	Japan	Chiaki Matsumura; Yasumasa Tanida	Norway	Martine Rønning; Mathias Brænden
2024	Sweden	Isabella Wranå; Rasmus Wranå	Estonia	Marie Kaldvee; Harri Lill	Norway	Kristin Skaslien; Magnus Nedregotten
2025	Italy	Stefania Constantini; Amos Mosaner	Scotland	Jennifer Dodds; Bruce Mouat	Australia	Tahli Gill; Dean Hewitt
2026	Australia	Tahli Gill; Dean Hewitt	Sweden	Therese Westman; Robin Ahlberg	Canada	Kadriana Lott; Colton Lott

== See also ==
- World Curling Championships
- List of World Men's Curling Champions
- List of World Women's Curling Champions
- List of Olympic medalists in curling
- List of Paralympic medalists in wheelchair curling
- List of European Curling Champions
- Pan Continental Curling Championships
- List of World Junior Curling Champions
