= 2018–19 Curling World Cup =

First edition of the Curling World Cup

- Dates: September 12, 2018 – May 12, 2019
- Host cities: Suzhou, China (First Leg); Omaha, United States (Second Leg); Jönköping, Sweden (Third Leg); Beijing, China (Grand Final)
- Women's winners: Canada (Homan) (First Leg); Japan (Fujisawa) (Second Leg); South Korea (Kim) (Third Leg); Canada (Jones) (Grand Final)
- Men's winners: Canada (Koe) (First Leg); United States (Shuster) (Second Leg); Canada (Dunstone) (Third Leg); Canada (Koe) (Grand Final)
- Mixed doubles winners: Canada (Walker/Muyres) (First Leg); Norway (Skaslien/Nedregotten) (Second Leg); Canada (Sahaidak/Lott) (Third Leg); Norway (Skaslien/Nedregotten) (Grand Final)

The 2018–19 Curling World Cup was the first and only edition of the Curling World Cup, held between men's, women's, and mixed doubles teams. It had three legs and a Grand Final, taking place in Suzhou, China, Omaha, United States, Jönköping, Sweden, and Beijing, China respectively.

== Format ==
Curling World Cup matches have eight ends, rather than the standard ten ends. Ties after eight ends are decided by a shoot-out, with each team throwing a stone and the one closest to the button winning. A win in eight or fewer ends earns a team 3 points, a shoot-out win 2 points, a shoot-out loss 1 point, and 0 points for a loss in eight or fewer ends.

Each event has eight teams in the men's, women's, and mixed doubles tournament. The teams are split into two groups of four, based on the Curling World Cup rankings, whereby the 1st, 3rd, 5th, and 7th, ranked teams are in one group and the 2nd, 4th, 6th, and 8th ranked teams in the other. The first place teams in each group plays against each other in the final. In the event of a tie for first place, a shoot-out is used, with the same format used to decide matches tied after eight ends.

== Qualification ==
For the first three legs of the Curling World Cup, the eight spots in the tournament are allocated to each of the hosting member associations, the highest ranked member association in each zone (the Americas, European, and Pacific-Asia), and two teams chosen by the World Curling Federation. Member associations may choose to send the same teams to all three legs or have different teams.

The following countries qualified for each discipline:

Qualification method	Women	Men	Mixed doubles
Hosting member association	China	China	China
Hosting member association	United States	United States	United States
Hosting member association	Sweden	Sweden	Sweden
Highest ranked member association in the Americas zone	Canada	Canada	Canada
Highest ranked member association in the European zone	Scotland	Switzerland	Switzerland
Highest ranked member association in the Pacific-Asia zone	South Korea	Japan	South Korea
Selected by World Curling Federation	Japan	Norway	Russia
Selected by World Curling Federation	Russia	Scotland	Norway

The host (China), the winners of each leg, the current world champions, a team specifically invited, and the two highest remaining member associations on the Curling World Cup ranking list qualified for the Grand Final. Two separate teams from the same member association may qualify for the Grand Final.

The following countries qualified for each discipline:

Qualification method	Women	Men	Mixed doubles
Hosting member association	China	China	China
First leg winner	Canada (Homan)^{1}	Canada (Koe)	Canada (Walker/Muyres)
Second leg winner	Japan (Fujisawa)	United States (Shuster)	Norway (Skaslien/Nedregotten)
Third leg winner	South Korea (Kim)	Canada (Dunstone)	Canada (Sahaidak/Lott)
Highest ranked remaining member associations	Sweden	Sweden	Switzerland
Highest ranked remaining member associations	Russia	Scotland	United States
World champions	Switzerland (Tirinzoni)	~~Sweden (Edin)~~^{3}	Switzerland (Jäggi/Michel)^{2}
Invited by World Curling Federation^{4}	United States	Norway	Russia

Notes

1. Team Homan is being replaced by a team consisting of Jennifer Jones, Kaitlyn Lawes, Shannon Birchard and Jill Officer due to Homan and her second Joanne Courtney being due to give birth in the summer.
2. The 2018 World Mixed Doubles Curling Champions, Michèle Jäggi and Sven Michel, were selected to compete due to the short time between the 2019 Championship and the Grand Final.
3. With Team Edin already qualified for the Grand Final, Switzerland, the highest-ranked country not yet qualified, was invited.
4. In each discipline, the WCF chose to invite the highest-ranked country not yet qualified.

=== Ranking points ===
Ranking points were assigned in each of the first three legs to determine the final member associations qualified for the Grand Final. Member associations were awarded their points from round robin play as well as 5 points for the runner-up and 10 for the champion.

Key
Teams to Grand Final (leg winner)
Teams to Grand Final (ranking points)

Women

Country	First Leg	Second Leg	Third Leg	Total
Sweden	20	9	20	49
South Korea	3	17	25	45
Japan	9	25	8	42
Canada	25	12	0	37
Russia	9	6	11	26
United States	9	6	9	24
Scotland	6	12	4	22
China	6	0	10	16

Men

Country	First Leg	Second Leg	Third Leg	Total
Canada	25	3	25	53
Sweden	8	20	20	48
United States	7	25	7	39
Scotland	12	9	13	34
Norway	20	9	4	33
Switzerland	9	6	11	26
China	6	9	3	18
Japan	0	6	3	9

Mixed doubles

Country	First Leg	Second Leg	Third Leg	Total
Canada	25	7	23	55
Norway	9	22	17	48
Switzerland	12	22	12	46
United States	23	11	11	45
Russia	7	6	10	23
Sweden	5	3	11	19
China	3	7	3	13
South Korea	3	9	0	12

== First leg ==
=== Women ===
==== Round-robin standings ====
Group A
Country	Skip	W	SOW	SOL	L	Pts
Sweden	Anna Hasselborg	5	0	0	1	15
Japan	Satsuki Fujisawa	3	0	0	3	9
China	Liu Sijia	2	0	0	4	6
Scotland	Jennifer Dodds	2	0	0	4	6

Group B
Country	Skip	W	SOW	SOL	L	Pts
Canada	Rachel Homan	5	0	0	1	15
Russia	Anna Sidorova	3	0	0	3	9
United States	Nina Roth	3	0	0	3	9
South Korea	Kim Min-ji	1	0	0	5	3

==== Final ====
Sunday, September 17, 12:00

Sheet C	1	2	3	4	5	6	7	8	Final
Canada (Homan) 🔨	0	2	1	0	1	0	0	3	7
Sweden (Hasselborg)	0	0	0	1	0	2	0	0	3

=== Men ===
==== Round-robin standings ====
Group A
Country	Skip	W	SOW	SOL	L	Pts
Norway	Steffen Walstad	5	0	0	1	15
Sweden	Niklas Edin	2	1	0	3	8
United States	Rich Ruohonen	2	0	1	3	7
China	Zang Jialiang	2	0	0	4	6

Group B
Country	Skip	W	SOW	SOL	L	Pts
Canada	Kevin Koe	5	0	0	1	15
Scotland	Bruce Mouat	4	0	0	2	12
Switzerland	Peter de Cruz	3	0	0	3	9
Japan	Masaki Iwai	0	0	0	6	0

==== Final ====
Sunday, September 17, 16:00

Sheet C	1	2	3	4	5	6	7	8	Final
Canada (Koe)	0	3	0	2	0	1	0	0	6
Norway (Walstad) 🔨	1	0	1	0	1	0	1	1	5

=== Mixed doubles ===
==== Round-robin standings ====
Group A
Country	Athletes	W	SOW	SOL	L	Pts
Canada	Laura Walker / Kirk Muyres	5	0	0	1	15
Norway	Kristin Skaslien / Sander Rølvåg	3	0	0	3	9
Russia	Maria Komarova / Daniil Goriachev	2	0	1	3	7
Sweden	Therese Westman / Robin Ahlberg	1	1	0	4	5

Group B
Country	Athletes	W	SOW	SOL	L	Pts
United States	Sarah Anderson / Korey Dropkin	6	0	0	0	18
Switzerland	Jenny Perret / Martin Rios	4	0	0	2	12
China	Yu Jiaxin / Wang Xiangkun	1	0	0	5	3
South Korea	Jang Hye-ri / Choi Chi-won	1	0	0	5	3

==== Final ====
Sunday, September 16, 08:30

Sheet C	1	2	3	4	5	6	7	8	Final
United States (Anderson/Dropkin) 🔨	2	0	1	0	0	0	0	X	3
Canada (Walker/Muyres)	0	1	0	1	3	1	1	X	7

== Second leg ==
=== Women ===
==== Round-robin standings ====
Group A
Country	Skip	W	SOW	SOL	L	Pts
South Korea	Kim Min-ji	4	0	0	2	12
Canada	Tracy Fleury	4	0	0	2	12
Russia	Alina Kovaleva	2	0	0	4	6
United States	Jamie Sinclair	2	0	0	4	6

Group B
Country	Skip	W	SOW	SOL	L	Pts
Japan	Satsuki Fujisawa	5	0	0	1	15
Scotland	Eve Muirhead	4	0	0	2	12
Sweden	Anna Hasselborg	3	0	0	3	9
China	Yang Ying	0	0	0	6	0

==== Final ====
Sunday, December 9, 12:00

Sheet C	1	2	3	4	5	6	7	8	Final
South Korea (Kim)	0	4	0	1	1	0	0	0	6
Japan (Fujisawa) 🔨	2	0	1	0	0	1	1	2	7

=== Men ===
==== Round-robin standings ====
Group A
Country	Skip	W	SOW	SOL	L	Pts
United States	John Shuster	5	0	0	1	15
China	Zou Qiang	3	0	0	3	9
Scotland	Bruce Mouat	3	0	0	3	9
Canada	Jason Gunnlaugson	1	0	0	5	3

Group B
Country	Skip	W	SOW	SOL	L	Pts
Sweden	Niklas Edin	5	0	0	1	15
Norway	Thomas Ulsrud	3	0	0	3	9
Japan	Yuta Matsumura	2	0	0	4	6
Switzerland	Yannick Schwaller	2	0	0	4	6

==== Final ====
Sunday, December 9, 16:00

Sheet C	1	2	3	4	5	6	7	8	Final
United States (Shuster)	0	1	0	0	0	1	1	X	3
Sweden (Edin) 🔨	0	0	0	0	1	0	0	X	1

=== Mixed doubles ===
==== Round-robin standings ====
Group A
Country	Athletes	W	SOW	SOL	L	Pts
Switzerland	Jenny Perret / Martin Rios	5	1	0	0	17
South Korea	Jang Hye-ri / Choe Chi-won	3	0	0	3	9
Canada	Kalynn Park / John Morris	2	0	1	3	7
Sweden	Malin Wengdel / Fabian Wingfors	1	0	0	5	3

Group B
Country	Athletes	W	SOW	SOL	L	Pts
Norway	Kristin Skaslien / Magnus Nedregotten	4	0	0	2	12
United States	Tabitha Peterson / Joe Polo	3	1	0	2	11
China	Wang Rui / Ba Dexin	2	0	1	3	7
Russia	Anastasia Moskaleva / Alexander Eremin	2	0	0	4	6

==== Final ====
Sunday, December 9, 08:30

Sheet C	1	2	3	4	5	6	7	8	Final
Switzerland (Perret/Rios) 🔨	4	0	0	0	0	1	0	X	5
Norway (Skaslien/Nedregotten)	0	2	1	2	1	0	4	X	10

== Third leg ==
=== Women ===
==== Round-robin standings ====
Group A
Country	Skip	W	SOW	SOL	L	Pts
Sweden	Anna Hasselborg	5	0	0	1	15
Russia	Anna Sidorova	3	1	0	2	11
China	Jiang Yilun	3	0	1	2	10
Canada	Darcy Robertson	0	0	0	6	0

Group B
Country	Skip	W	SOW	SOL	L	Pts
South Korea	Kim Min-ji	5	0	0	1	15
United States	Cory Christensen	2	1	1	2	9
Japan	Tori Koana	2	0	2	2	8
Scotland	Sophie Jackson	0	2	0	4	4

==== Final ====
Sunday, February 3, 16:00

Sheet D	1	2	3	4	5	6	7	8	Final
Sweden (Hasselborg)	0	1	0	1	1	0	1	X	4
South Korea (Kim) 🔨	2	0	2	0	0	2	0	X	6

=== Men ===
==== Round-robin standings ====
Group A
Country	Skip	W	SOW	SOL	L	Pts
Sweden	Niklas Edin	4	1	1	0	15
Switzerland	Yannick Schwaller	3	1	0	2	11
United States	Mark Fenner	2	0	1	3	7
Japan	Masaki Iwai	1	0	0	5	3

Group B
Country	Skip	W	SOW	SOL	L	Pts
Canada	Matt Dunstone	5	0	1	0	16
Scotland	Ross Paterson	3	2	0	1	13
Norway	Steffen Walstad	1	0	1	4	4
China	Ma Xiuyue	1	0	0	5	3

==== Final ====
Sunday, February 3, 12:00

Sheet D	1	2	3	4	5	6	7	8	Final
Sweden (Edin)	1	0	0	1	0	2	0	0	4
Canada (Dunstone) 🔨	0	0	2	0	2	0	0	1	5

=== Mixed doubles ===
==== Round-robin standings ====
Group A
Country	Athletes	W	SOW	SOL	L	Pts
Canada	Kadriana Sahaidak / Colton Lott	4	0	1	1	13
Switzerland	Jenny Perret / Martin Rios	4	0	0	2	12
Sweden	Camilla Noreen / Per Noreen	3	1	0	2	11
South Korea	Jang Hye-ri / Choe Chi-won	0	0	0	6	0

Group B
Country	Athletes	W	SOW	SOL	L	Pts
Norway	Kristin Skaslien / Thomas Ulsrud	4	0	0	2	12
United States	Becca Hamilton / Matt Hamilton	3	1	0	2	11
Russia	Maria Komarova / Daniil Goriachev	3	0	1	2	10
China	Chang Cao / Minjie Yuan	1	0	0	5	3

==== Final ====
Sunday, February 3, 08:30

Sheet D	1	2	3	4	5	6	7	8	Final
Canada (Sahaidak/Lott) 🔨	1	2	1	0	1	0	0	2	7
Norway (Skaslien/Ulsrud)	0	0	0	2	0	1	2	0	5

== Grand Final ==
=== Women ===
==== Round-robin standings ====
Group A
Team	W	SOW	SOL	L	Pts
Canada (Jones)	2	2	0	2	10
Japan (Fujisawa)	3	0	1	2	10
China (Jiang)	3	0	0	3	9
United States (Roth)	2	0	1	3	7

Group B
Team	W	SOW	SOL	L	Pts
Switzerland (Tirinzoni)	4	0	1	1	13
Russia (Sidorova)	4	0	0	2	12
Sweden (Hasselborg)	2	0	0	4	6
South Korea (Kim)	1	1	0	4	5

==== Final ====
Sunday, May 12, 16:00

Sheet C	1	2	3	4	5	6	7	8	Final
Canada (Jones)	1	2	0	1	1	0	2	2	9
Switzerland (Tirinzoni) 🔨	0	0	3	0	0	3	0	0	6

=== Men ===
==== Round-robin standings ====
Group A
Team	W	SOW	SOL	L	Pts
China (Zou)	4	0	0	2	12
Sweden (Edin)	3	0	0	3	9
United States (Shuster)	2	1	0	3	8
Canada (Dunstone)	2	0	1	3	7

Group B
Team	W	SOW	SOL	L	Pts
Canada (Koe)	4	0	0	2	12
Scotland (Paterson)	4	0	0	2	12
Switzerland (Schwaller)	3	0	0	3	9
Norway (Ulsrud)	1	0	0	5	3

==== Final ====
Sunday, May 12, 09:00

Sheet C	1	2	3	4	5	6	7	8	Final
China (Zou) 🔨	1	0	0	1	0	0	1	0	3
Canada (Koe)	0	1	1	0	1	1	0	1	5

=== Mixed doubles ===
==== Round-robin standings ====
Group A
Team	W	SOW	SOL	L	Pts
Canada (Walker/Muyres)	4	1	0	1	14
United States (Anderson/Dropkin)	4	0	0	2	12
Switzerland (Jäggi/Michel)	2	0	1	3	7
China (Cao/Yuan)	1	0	0	5	3

Group B
Team	W	SOW	SOL	L	Pts
Norway (Skaslien/Nedregotten)	5	0	1	0	16
Canada (Sahaidak/Lott)	3	1	0	2	11
Switzerland (Perret/Rios)	2	0	1	3	7
Russia (Komarova/Goriachev)	0	1	0	5	2

==== Final ====
Sunday, May 12, 13:00

Sheet C	1	2	3	4	5	6	7	8	Final
Canada (Walker/Muyres)	1	0	0	1	0	1	0	X	3
Norway (Skaslien/Nedregotten) 🔨	0	3	1	0	2	0	2	X	8
