= 2018–19 Curling World Cup – Third Leg =

2018–19 Curling World Cup Third Leg
- Host city: Jönköping, Sweden
- Arena: Jönköping Curling Club
- Dates: January 30–February 3, 2019
- Women's winner: South Korea
- Skip: Kim Min-ji
- Third: Kim Hye-rin
- Second: Yang Tae-i
- Lead: Kim Su-jin
- Coach: Lee Sung-jun
- Finalist: Sweden (Hasselborg)
- Men's winner: Canada
- Skip: Matt Dunstone
- Third: Braeden Moskowy
- Second: Catlin Schneider
- Lead: Dustin Kidby
- Coach: Scott Pfeifer
- Finalist: Sweden (Edin)
- Mixed doubles winner: Canada
- Female: Kadriana Sahaidak
- Male: Colton Lott
- Coach: Scott Pfeifer
- Finalist: Norway (Skaslien/Ulsrud)

The Third Leg of the 2018–19 Curling World Cup took place from January 30 to February 3, 2019 at the Jönköping Curling Club in Jönköping, Sweden. Korea's Kim Min-ji defeated Sweden's Anna Hasselborg in the women's final. Canada's Matt Dunstone defeated Sweden's Niklas Edin in the men's final. Canada's Kadriana Sahaidak and Colton Lott beat Norway's Kristin Skaslien and Thomas Ulsrud for mixed doubles gold.

== Format ==
Curling World Cup matches have eight ends, rather than the standard ten ends. Ties after eight ends will be decided by a shoot-out, with each team throwing a stone and the one closest to the button winning. A win in eight or fewer ends will earn a team 3 points, a shoot-out win 2 points, a shoot-out less 1 point, and 0 points for a loss in eight or fewer ends.

Each event will have eight teams in the men's, women's, and mixed doubles tournament. The teams will be split into two groups of four, based on the Curling World Cup rankings, whereby the 1st, 3rd, 5th, and 7th, ranked teams will be in one group and the 2nd, 4th, 6th, and 8th ranked teams in the other. The first place teams in each group will play against each other in the final. In the event of a tie for first place, a shoot-out will be used, with the same format used to decide matches tied after eight ends.

== Qualification ==
For the first three legs of the Curling World Cup, the eight spots in the tournament are allocated to each of the hosting member associations, the highest ranked member association in each zone (the Americas, European, and Pacific-Asia), and two teams chosen by the World Curling Federation. Member associations may choose to send the same teams to all three legs or have different teams.

The following countries qualified for each discipline:

Qualification method	Women	Men	Mixed doubles
Hosting member association	China	China	China
Hosting member association	United States	United States	United States
Hosting member association	Sweden	Sweden	Sweden
Highest ranked member association in the Americas zone	Canada	Canada	Canada
Highest ranked member association in the European zone	Scotland	Switzerland	Switzerland
Highest ranked member association in the Pacific-Asia zone	South Korea	Japan	South Korea
Selected by World Curling Federation	Japan	Norway	Russia
Selected by World Curling Federation	Russia	Scotland	Norway

== Women ==
=== Teams ===
Canada	China	Japan	Russia
Skip: Darcy Robertson; Third: Karen Klein; Second: Vanessa Foster; Lead: Theresa Cannon	Skip: Jiang Yilun; Third: Zhang Lijun; Second: Dong Ziqi; Lead: Jiang Xindi	Skip: Tori Koana; Third: Junko Nishimuro; Second: Mao Ishigaki; Lead: Arisa Kotani; Alternate: Yuna Kotani	Skip: Anna Sidorova; Third: Margarita Fomina; Second: Julia Portunova; Lead: Julia Guzieva
Scotland	South Korea	Sweden	United States
Skip: Sophie Jackson; Third: Naomi Brown; Second: Mili Smith; Lead: Sophie Sinclair	Skip: Kim Min-ji; Third: Kim Hye-rin; Second: Yang Tae-i; Lead: Kim Su-jin	Skip: Anna Hasselborg; Third: Sara McManus; Second: Agnes Knochenhauer; Lead: Sofia Mabergs	Skip: Cory Christensen; Third: Vicky Persinger; Second: Jenna Martin; Lead: Madison Bear

=== Round robin standings ===
Group A
Country	Skip	W	SOW	SOL	L	Pts
Sweden	Anna Hasselborg	5	0	0	1	15
Russia	Anna Sidorova	3	1	0	2	11
China	Jiang Yilun	3	0	1	2	10
Canada	Darcy Robertson	0	0	0	6	0

Group B
Country	Skip	W	SOW	SOL	L	Pts
South Korea	Kim Min-ji	5	0	0	1	15
United States	Cory Christensen	2	1	1	2	9
Japan	Tori Koana	2	0	2	2	8
Scotland	Sophie Jackson	0	2	0	4	4

=== Round robin results ===
==== Draw 3 ====
Wednesday, January 30, 20:30

Sheet B	1	2	3	4	5	6	7	8	Final
Japan (Koana) 🔨	0	0	2	0	2	0	1	0	5
South Korea (Kim)	1	1	0	2	0	2	0	1	7

Sheet C	1	2	3	4	5	6	7	8	Final
Scotland (Jackson) 🔨	1	0	1	0	0	0	0	0	2
United States (Christensen)	0	1	0	2	0	1	1	1	6

Sheet D	1	2	3	4	5	6	7	8	Final
Sweden (Hasselborg) 🔨	0	0	3	0	3	1	1	X	8
Canada (Robertson)	0	0	0	2	0	0	0	X	2

Sheet E	1	2	3	4	5	6	7	8	Final
Russia (Sidorova)	0	2	1	0	0	3	0	0	6
China (Jiang) 🔨	2	0	0	2	2	0	1	1	8

==== Draw 5 ====
Thursday, January 31, 12:00

Sheet B	1	2	3	4	5	6	7	8	Final
Sweden (Hasselborg) 🔨	0	1	2	2	0	3	0	X	8
China (Jiang)	1	0	0	0	2	0	1	X	4

Sheet C	1	2	3	4	5	6	7	8	Final
Canada (Robertson) 🔨	1	0	1	1	0	2	0	X	5
Russia (Sidorova)	0	3	0	0	3	0	2	X	8

Sheet D	1	2	3	4	5	6	7	8	Final
Japan (Koana) 🔨	2	0	2	1	0	0	1	X	6
Scotland (Jackson)	0	1	0	0	1	1	0	X	3

Sheet E	1	2	3	4	5	6	7	8	Final
South Korea (Kim) 🔨	0	0	0	3	1	0	1	0	5
United States (Christensen)	1	0	2	0	0	2	0	1	6

==== Draw 7 ====
Thursday, January 31, 20:00

Sheet B	1	2	3	4	5	6	7	8	Final
China (Jiang) 🔨	1	0	0	2	1	0	2	0	6
Canada (Robertson)	0	1	2	0	0	0	0	2	5

Sheet C	1	2	3	4	5	6	7	8	Final
United States (Christensen) 🔨	0	0	2	0	2	0	1	X	5
Japan (Koana)	1	1	0	3	0	3	0	X	8

Sheet D	1	2	3	4	5	6	7	8	Final
Russia (Sidorova) 🔨	1	1	0	2	0	0	0	1	5
Sweden (Hasselborg)	0	0	2	0	1	0	1	0	4

Sheet E	1	2	3	4	5	6	7	8	Final
Scotland (Jackson) 🔨	1	0	0	0	0	1	0	X	2
South Korea (Kim)	0	3	1	0	1	0	2	X	7

==== Draw 9 ====
Friday, February 1, 12:00

Sheet A	1	2	3	4	5	6	7	8	9	Final
China (Jiang)	0	0	0	1	2	0	1	0	0	4
Russia (Sidorova) 🔨	0	1	0	0	0	2	0	1	1	5

Sheet C	1	2	3	4	5	6	7	8	Final
Canada (Robertson) 🔨	0	1	0	0	0	0	X	X	1
Sweden (Hasselborg)	1	0	0	3	1	3	X	X	8

==== Draw 10 ====
Friday, February 1, 16:00

Sheet A	1	2	3	4	5	6	7	8	9	Final
United States (Christensen) 🔨	0	0	1	0	0	1	0	0	0	2
Scotland (Jackson)	0	0	0	0	1	0	0	1	1	3

Sheet D	1	2	3	4	5	6	7	8	Final
South Korea (Kim) 🔨	0	2	0	0	2	0	1	1	6
Japan (Koana)	0	0	1	0	0	2	0	0	3

==== Draw 12 ====
Saturday, February 2, 08:30

Sheet A	1	2	3	4	5	6	7	8	Final
China (Jiang) 🔨	1	0	0	1	0	0	0	X	2
Sweden (Hasselborg)	0	2	3	0	0	0	1	X	6

Sheet B	1	2	3	4	5	6	7	8	9	Final
Scotland (Jackson) 🔨	0	0	1	0	2	0	1	0	1	5
Japan (Koana)	0	1	0	1	0	1	0	1	0	4

Sheet C	1	2	3	4	5	6	7	8	Final
Russia (Sidorova) 🔨	2	1	1	1	1	1	X	X	7
Canada (Robertson)	0	0	0	0	0	0	X	X	0

Sheet D	1	2	3	4	5	6	7	8	Final
United States (Christensen) 🔨	0	0	0	1	0	1	0	X	2
South Korea (Kim)	1	1	1	0	2	0	2	X	7

==== Draw 14 ====
Saturday, February 2, 16:00

Sheet B	1	2	3	4	5	6	7	8	Final
South Korea (Kim) 🔨	0	0	3	0	0	3	5	X	11
Scotland (Jackson)	0	1	0	0	2	0	0	X	3

Sheet C	1	2	3	4	5	6	7	8	9	Final
Japan (Koana) 🔨	2	0	0	3	0	0	2	0	0	7
United States (Christensen)	0	1	1	0	2	2	0	1	1	8

Sheet D	1	2	3	4	5	6	7	8	Final
Canada (Robertson) 🔨	0	0	2	1	1	0	0	X	4
China (Jiang)	1	1	0	0	0	4	2	X	8

==== Draw 15 ====
Saturday, February 2, 20:00

Sheet E	1	2	3	4	5	6	7	8	Final
Sweden (Hasselborg) 🔨	1	0	1	0	2	2	0	1	7
Russia (Sidorova)	0	1	0	1	0	0	4	0	6

=== Final ===
Sunday, February 3, 16:00

Sheet D	1	2	3	4	5	6	7	8	Final
Sweden (Hasselborg)	0	1	0	1	1	0	1	X	4
South Korea (Kim) 🔨	2	0	2	0	0	2	0	X	6

== Men ==
=== Teams ===
Canada	China	Japan	Norway
Skip: Matt Dunstone; Third: Braeden Moskowy; Second: Catlin Schneider; Lead: Dustin Kidby	Skip: Ma Xiuyue; Third: Zhi Ling; Second: Kuo Cheng; Lead: Jingyuan Wang	Fourth: Go Aoki; Skip: Masaki Iwai; Second: Ryotaro Shukuya; Lead: Kouki Ogiwara	Skip: Steffen Walstad; Third: Markus Høiberg; Second: Magnus Nedregotten; Lead: Magnus Vågberg
Scotland	Sweden	Switzerland	United States
Skip: Ross Paterson; Third: Kyle Waddell; Second: Duncan Menzies; Lead: Michael Goodfellow	Skip: Niklas Edin; Third: Oskar Eriksson; Second: Rasmus Wranå; Lead: Christoffer Sundgren	Skip: Yannick Schwaller; Third: Michael Brunner; Second: Romano Meier; Lead: Marcel Käufeler	Skip: Mark Fenner; Third: Tom Howell; Second: Korey Dropkin; Lead: Alex Fenson

=== Round robin standings ===
Group A
Country	Skip	W	SOW	SOL	L	Pts
Sweden	Niklas Edin	4	1	1	0	15
Switzerland	Yannick Schwaller	3	1	0	2	11
United States	Mark Fenner	2	0	1	3	7
Japan	Masaki Iwai	1	0	0	5	3

Group B
Country	Skip	W	SOW	SOL	L	Pts
Canada	Matt Dunstone	5	0	1	0	16
Scotland	Ross Paterson	3	2	0	1	13
Norway	Steffen Walstad	1	0	1	4	4
China	Ma Xiuyue	1	0	0	5	3

=== Round robin results ===
==== Draw 2 ====
Wednesday, January 30, 17:30

Sheet B	1	2	3	4	5	6	7	8	Final
Norway (Walstad) 🔨	0	0	0	0	0	2	0	X	2
Canada (Dunstone)	0	2	2	0	1	0	3	X	8

Sheet C	1	2	3	4	5	6	7	8	Final
Scotland (Paterson) 🔨	0	1	0	0	2	1	0	2	6
China (Ma)	1	0	1	0	0	0	1	0	3

Sheet D	1	2	3	4	5	6	7	8	Final
Sweden (Edin) 🔨	2	2	2	1	0	4	X	X	11
United States (Fenner)	0	0	0	0	1	0	X	X	1

Sheet E	1	2	3	4	5	6	7	8	Final
Switzerland (Schwaller) 🔨	0	1	2	1	1	1	X	X	6
Japan (Iwai)	1	0	0	0	0	0	X	X	1

==== Draw 4 ====
Thursday, January 31, 08:30

Sheet A	1	2	3	4	5	6	7	8	9	Final
Norway (Walstad) 🔨	2	0	0	0	0	0	2	0	0	4
Scotland (Paterson)	0	1	0	1	0	0	0	2	1	5

==== Draw 5 ====
Thursday, January 31, 12:00

Sheet A	1	2	3	4	5	6	7	8	Final
Canada (Dunstone) 🔨	1	1	0	2	0	2	0	X	6
China (Ma)	0	0	1	0	1	0	1	X	3

==== Draw 6 ====
Thursday, January 31, 16:00

Sheet D	1	2	3	4	5	6	7	8	Final
United States (Fenner) 🔨	0	1	0	2	0	1	0	2	6
Japan (Iwai)	0	0	2	0	1	0	1	0	4

Sheet E	1	2	3	4	5	6	7	8	9	Final
Sweden (Edin) 🔨	1	1	0	2	0	1	0	0	0	5
Switzerland (Schwaller)	0	0	1	0	1	0	1	2	1	6

==== Draw 8 ====
Friday, February 1, 08:30

Sheet A	1	2	3	4	5	6	7	8	Final
Japan (Iwai) 🔨	1	0	0	0	1	0	1	1	4
Sweden (Edin)	0	0	2	2	0	1	0	0	5

Sheet B	1	2	3	4	5	6	7	8	Final
Switzerland (Schwaller) 🔨	1	1	0	1	0	2	0	1	6
United States (Fenner)	0	0	1	0	1	0	2	0	4

Sheet D	1	2	3	4	5	6	7	8	Final
China (Ma) 🔨	1	0	1	0	1	0	3	0	6
Norway (Walstad)	0	2	0	3	0	2	0	3	10

Sheet E	1	2	3	4	5	6	7	8	9	Final
Scotland (Paterson) 🔨	1	0	0	0	2	0	0	1	1	5
Canada (Dunstone)	0	0	0	2	0	1	1	0	0	4

==== Draw 10 ====
Friday, February 1, 16:00

Sheet B	1	2	3	4	5	6	7	8	Final
Canada (Dunstone) 🔨	1	1	0	4	0	2	0	1	9
Norway (Walstad)	0	0	1	0	4	0	2	0	7

Sheet C	1	2	3	4	5	6	7	8	Final
China (Ma) 🔨	2	1	0	1	0	1	0	1	6
Scotland (Paterson)	0	0	2	0	3	0	2	0	7

Sheet E	1	2	3	4	5	6	7	8	9	Final
United States (Fenner) 🔨	1	0	1	1	2	0	2	0	0	7
Sweden (Edin)	0	2	0	0	0	3	0	2	1	8

==== Draw 11 ====
Friday, February 1, 20:00

Sheet C	1	2	3	4	5	6	7	8	Final
Japan (Iwai) 🔨	1	0	1	0	0	1	X	X	3
Switzerland (Schwaller)	0	2	0	2	4	0	X	X	8

==== Draw 12 ====
Saturday, February 2, 08:30

Sheet E	1	2	3	4	5	6	7	8	Final
China (Ma) 🔨	1	0	1	0	0	0	X	X	2
Canada (Dunstone)	0	1	0	3	2	3	X	X	9

==== Draw 13 ====
Saturday, February 2, 12:00

Sheet A	1	2	3	4	5	6	7	8	Final
Scotland (Paterson) 🔨	0	4	0	2	1	0	1	X	8
Norway (Walstad)	1	0	2	0	0	1	0	X	4

Sheet C	1	2	3	4	5	6	7	8	Final
Switzerland (Schwaller) 🔨	0	1	0	1	0	3	0	X	5
Sweden (Edin)	3	0	2	0	3	0	1	X	9

Sheet E	1	2	3	4	5	6	7	8	Final
Japan (Iwai) 🔨	2	0	2	0	3	1	X	X	8
United States (Fenner)	0	1	0	1	0	0	X	X	2

==== Draw 15 ====
Saturday, February 2, 20:00

Sheet A	1	2	3	4	5	6	7	8	Final
Norway (Walstad) 🔨	3	0	1	0	0	0	1	0	5
China (Ma)	0	3	0	2	0	1	0	1	7

Sheet B	1	2	3	4	5	6	7	8	Final
United States (Fenner) 🔨	2	2	0	0	3	0	3	X	10
Switzerland (Schwaller)	0	0	1	1	0	1	0	X	3

Sheet C	1	2	3	4	5	6	7	8	Final
Sweden (Edin) 🔨	2	0	0	2	0	3	X	X	7
Japan (Iwai)	0	1	0	0	1	0	X	X	2

Sheet D	1	2	3	4	5	6	7	8	Final
Canada (Dunstone) 🔨	0	0	2	0	0	2	0	1	5
Scotland (Paterson)	0	0	0	0	2	0	1	0	3

=== Final ===
Sunday, February 3, 12:00

Sheet D	1	2	3	4	5	6	7	8	Final
Sweden (Edin)	1	0	0	1	0	2	0	0	4
Canada (Dunstone) 🔨	0	0	2	0	2	0	0	1	5

== Mixed doubles ==
=== Teams ===
Canada	China	Norway	Russia
Female: Kadriana Sahaidak; Male: Colton Lott	Female: Cao Chang; Male: Yuan Mingjie	Female: Kristin Skaslien; Male: Thomas Ulsrud	Female: Maria Komarova; Male: Daniil Goriachev
South Korea	Sweden	Switzerland	United States
Female: Jang Hye-ri; Male: Choi Chi-won	Female: Camilla Noreen; Male: Per Noreen	Female: Jenny Perret; Male: Martin Rios	Female: Becca Hamilton; Male: Matt Hamilton

=== Round robin standings ===
Group A
Country	Athletes	W	SOW	SOL	L	Pts
Canada	Kadriana Sahaidak / Colton Lott	4	0	1	1	13
Switzerland	Jenny Perret / Martin Rios	4	0	0	2	12
Sweden	Camilla Noreen / Per Noreen	3	1	0	2	11
South Korea	Jang Hye-ri / Choe Chi-won	0	0	0	6	0

Group B
Country	Athletes	W	SOW	SOL	L	Pts
Norway	Kristin Skaslien / Thomas Ulsrud	4	0	0	2	12
United States	Becca Hamilton / Matt Hamilton	3	1	0	2	11
Russia	Maria Komarova / Daniil Goriachev	3	0	1	2	10
China	Cao Chang / Yuan Mingjie	1	0	0	5	3

=== Round robin results ===
==== Draw 1 ====
Wednesday, January 30, 14:30

Sheet B	1	2	3	4	5	6	7	8	Final
United States (Hamilton/Hamilton) 🔨	0	2	0	3	0	0	0	X	5
Norway (Skaslien/Ulsrud)	1	0	2	0	3	1	1	X	8

Sheet C	1	2	3	4	5	6	7	8	Final
Russia (Komarova/Goriachev) 🔨	1	1	0	1	0	0	3	0	6
China (Cao/Yuan)	0	0	1	0	1	1	0	1	4

Sheet D	1	2	3	4	5	6	7	8	Final
Switzerland (Perret/Rios) 🔨	2	0	0	1	0	3	0	1	7
Canada (Sahaidak/Lott)	0	2	2	0	2	0	2	0	8

Sheet E	1	2	3	4	5	6	7	8	Final
South Korea (Jang/Choe) 🔨	0	3	2	0	1	1	0	0	7
Sweden (Noreen/Noreen)	1	0	0	4	0	0	3	1	9

==== Draw 4 ====
Thursday, January 31, 08:30

Sheet B	1	2	3	4	5	6	7	8	Final
Switzerland (Perret/Rios) 🔨	1	0	1	1	0	3	0	1	7
South Korea (Jang/Choe)	0	2	0	0	3	0	1	0	6

Sheet C	1	2	3	4	5	6	7	8	9	Final
Canada (Sahaidak/Lott) 🔨	3	0	2	0	2	0	2	0	0	9
Sweden (Noreen/Noreen)	0	3	0	2	0	2	0	2	1	10

Sheet D	1	2	3	4	5	6	7	8	Final
United States (Hamilton/Hamilton) 🔨	0	3	0	1	0	5	0	X	9
Russia (Komarova/Goriachev)	1	0	2	0	2	0	1	X	6

Sheet E	1	2	3	4	5	6	7	8	Final
Norway (Skaslien/Ulsrud) 🔨	0	5	0	1	0	0	0	X	6
China (Cao/Yuan)	4	0	2	0	1	2	1	X	10

==== Draw 6 ====
Thursday, January 31, 16:00

Sheet A	1	2	3	4	5	6	7	8	Final
Russia (Komarova/Goriachev) 🔨	1	0	5	0	3	0	0	1	10
Norway (Skaslien/Ulsrud)	0	1	0	3	0	3	1	0	8

Sheet B	1	2	3	4	5	6	7	8	Final
China (Cao/Yuan) 🔨	0	1	1	2	0	1	0	0	5
United States (Hamilton/Hamilton)	2	0	0	0	1	0	2	1	6

Sheet C	1	2	3	4	5	6	7	8	Final
Sweden (Noreen/Noreen) 🔨	1	2	0	1	0	0	2	0	6
Switzerland (Perret/Rios)	0	0	1	0	4	1	0	1	7

==== Draw 7 ====
Thursday, January 31, 20:00

Sheet A	1	2	3	4	5	6	7	8	Final
South Korea (Jang/Choe) 🔨	1	0	0	0	0	1	0	0	2
Canada (Sahaidak/Lott)	0	2	1	1	1	0	1	1	7

==== Draw 8 ====
Friday, February 1, 08:30

Sheet C	1	2	3	4	5	6	7	8	Final
China (Cao/Yuan) 🔨	0	0	2	0	1	0	0	X	3
Russia (Komarova/Goriachev)	1	1	0	3	0	1	2	X	8

==== Draw 9 ====
Friday, February 1, 12:00

Sheet B	1	2	3	4	5	6	7	8	Final
Canada (Sahaidak/Lott) 🔨	0	0	1	1	0	2	2	0	6
Switzerland (Perret/Rios)	1	3	0	0	3	0	0	2	9

Sheet C	1	2	3	4	5	6	7	8	Final
Norway (Skaslien/Ulsrud) 🔨	0	5	0	1	1	0	2	1	10
United States (Hamilton/Hamilton)	1	0	3	0	0	2	0	0	6

Sheet D	1	2	3	4	5	6	7	8	Final
Sweden (Noreen/Noreen) 🔨	2	0	3	1	0	1	3	X	10
South Korea (Jang/Choe)	0	1	0	0	2	0	0	X	3

==== Draw 11 ====
Friday, February 1, 20:00

Sheet A	1	2	3	4	5	6	7	8	Final
South Korea (Jang/Choe) 🔨	0	3	0	0	0	0	X	X	3
Switzerland (Perret/Rios)	3	0	1	2	2	1	X	X	9

Sheet B	1	2	3	4	5	6	7	8	Final
Sweden (Noreen/Noreen) 🔨	0	1	0	4	1	0	0	0	6
Canada (Sahaidak/Lott)	1	0	2	0	0	2	3	2	10

Sheet D	1	2	3	4	5	6	7	8	9	Final
Russia (Komarova/Goriachev) 🔨	0	1	2	0	1	0	2	0	0	6
United States (Hamilton/Hamilton)	1	0	0	1	0	1	0	3	1	7

Sheet E	1	2	3	4	5	6	7	8	Final
China (Cao/Yuan) 🔨	0	0	2	0	0	3	0	X	5
Norway (Skaslien/Ulsrud)	0	4	0	2	2	0	2	X	10

==== Draw 13 ====
Saturday, February 2, 12:00

Sheet B	1	2	3	4	5	6	7	8	Final
United States (Hamilton/Hamilton) 🔨	2	0	0	1	1	3	0	X	7
China (Cao/Yuan)	0	2	1	0	0	0	1	X	4

Sheet D	1	2	3	4	5	6	7	8	Final
Norway (Skaslien/Ulsrud) 🔨	2	0	2	0	3	0	1	X	8
Russia (Komarova/Goriachev)	0	1	0	1	0	2	0	X	4

==== Draw 14 ====
Saturday, February 2, 16:00

Sheet A	1	2	3	4	5	6	7	8	Final
Switzerland (Perret/Rios) 🔨	0	0	1	0	0	1	X	X	2
Sweden (Noreen/Noreen)	4	2	0	1	1	0	X	X	8

Sheet E	1	2	3	4	5	6	7	8	Final
Canada (Sahaidak/Lott) 🔨	0	2	1	0	1	0	3	0	7
South Korea (Jang/Choe)	1	0	0	1	0	2	0	1	5

=== Final ===
Sunday, February 2, 08:30

Sheet D	1	2	3	4	5	6	7	8	Final
Canada (Sahaidak/Lott) 🔨	1	2	1	0	1	0	0	2	7
Norway (Skaslien/Ulsrud)	0	0	0	2	0	1	2	0	5
