= 2017 World Mixed Doubles Curling Championship =

- Host city: Lethbridge, Canada
- Arena: Lethbridge Curling Club
- Dates: April 22–29, 2017
- Winner: Switzerland
- Female: Jenny Perret
- Male: Martin Rios
- Coach: Laurence Bidaud
- Finalist: Canada

The 2017 World Mixed Doubles Curling Championship was held from April 22 to 29 at the Lethbridge Curling Club in Lethbridge, Canada. The event was held in conjunction with the 2017 World Senior Curling Championships.

== Teams ==
| Australia | Austria | Belarus | Brazil | Bulgaria |
|---|---|---|---|---|
| Male: Dean Hewitt; Female: Lynn Hewitt | Male: Christian Roth; Female: Claudia Fischer | Male: Ilya Shalamitski; Female: Ekaterina Kirillova | Male: Márcio Cerquinho; Female: Anne Shibuya | Male: Reto Seiler; Female: Marina Yaneva |
| Canada | China | Croatia | Czech Republic | Denmark |
| Male: Reid Carruthers; Female: Joanne Courtney | Male: Ba Dexin; Female: Rui Wang | Male: Mislav Martinic; Female: Iva Roso | Male: Tomáš Paul; Female: Zuzana Hájková | Male: Kasper Wiksten; Female: Natalie Asp Wiksten |
| England | Estonia | Finland | France | Germany |
| Male: Ben Fowler; Female: Anna Fowler | Male: Erkki Lill; Female: Maile Mölder | Male: Tomi Rantamäki; Female: Oona Kauste | Male: Romain Borini; Female: Sandrine Morand | Male: Andy Buttner; Female: Julia Meissner |
| Hungary | Ireland | Israel | Italy | Japan |
| Male: Zsolt Kiss; Female: Dorottya Palancsa | Male: Neil Fyfe; Female: Allison Fyfe | Male: Leonid Rivkind; Female: Rachel Katzman | Male: Simone Gonin; Female: Veronica Zappone | Male: Shinya Abe; Female: Ayumi Ogasawara |
| Kazakhstan | Latvia | Netherlands | New Zealand | Norway |
| Male: Viktor Kim; Female: Diana Torkina | Male: Andris Bremanis; Female: Santa Blumberga | Male: Thomas Kooi; Female: Bonnie Nilhamn | Male: Scott Becker; Female: Bridget Becker | Male: Magnus Nedregotten; Female: Kristin Skaslien |
| Poland | Romania | Russia | Scotland | Serbia |
| Male: Damian Herman; Female: Karolina Florek | Male: Allen Coliban; Female: Iulia Traila | Male: Alexander Krushelnitskiy; Female: Anastasia Bryzgalova | Male: Bruce Mouat; Female: Gina Aitken | Male: Bohan Mijatovic; Female: Dara Gravara-Stojanovic |
| Slovakia | Slovenia | South Korea | Spain | Sweden |
| Male: David Misun; Female: Silvia Sykorova | Male: Jure Culic; Female: Ajda Zavrtanik Drglin | Male: Lee Ki-jeong; Female: Jang Hye-ji | Male: Gontzal Garcia; Female: Irantzu Garcia | Male: Per Noreen; Female: Camilla Noreen |
| Switzerland | Turkey | United States | Wales | |
| Male: Martin Rios; Female: Jenny Perret | Male: Alican Karataş; Female: Dilşat Yıldız | Male: Matt Hamilton; Female: Rebecca Hamilton | Male: Adrian Meikle; Female: Dawn Watson | |

== Round-robin standings ==
Final round-robin standings

Key
| Teams to Playoffs |

| Group A | W | L |
|---|---|---|
| Latvia | 7 | 0 |
| Hungary | 5 | 2 |
| Finland | 5 | 2 |
| Japan | 3 | 4 |
| Belarus | 3 | 4 |
| Brazil | 3 | 4 |
| Estonia | 2 | 5 |
| Croatia | 0 | 7 |

| Group D | W | L |
|---|---|---|
| United States | 7 | 0 |
| Czech Republic | 6 | 1 |
| Canada | 5 | 2 |
| England | 4 | 3 |
| France | 2 | 5 |
| Turkey | 2 | 5 |
| Germany | 2 | 5 |
| Kazakhstan | 0 | 7 |

| Group B | W | L |
|---|---|---|
| Scotland | 7 | 0 |
| Norway | 6 | 1 |
| Italy | 5 | 2 |
| Ireland | 4 | 3 |
| Bulgaria | 2 | 5 |
| Denmark | 2 | 5 |
| Wales | 2 | 5 |
| Serbia | 0 | 7 |

| Group E | W | L |
|---|---|---|
| Switzerland | 6 | 0 |
| Russia | 5 | 1 |
| Spain | 4 | 2 |
| Slovenia | 2 | 4 |
| Slovakia | 2 | 4 |
| New Zealand | 2 | 4 |
| Romania | 0 | 6 |

| Group C | W | L |
|---|---|---|
| South Korea | 7 | 0 |
| China | 6 | 1 |
| Sweden | 5 | 2 |
| Australia | 3 | 4 |
| Austria | 3 | 4 |
| Israel | 2 | 5 |
| Poland | 2 | 5 |
| Netherlands | 0 | 7 |

== Round-robin results ==
All draw times are listed in MDT (UTC-6).

=== Group A ===
==== Saturday, April 22 ====
Draw 1 8:00

| Sheet A | 1 | 2 | 3 | 4 | 5 | 6 | 7 | 8 | 9 | Final |
| Hungary 🔨 | 1 | 0 | 0 | 0 | 1 | 3 | 1 | 1 | 0 | 7 |
| Belarus | 0 | 4 | 1 | 2 | 0 | 0 | 0 | 0 | 1 | 8 |

| Sheet B | 1 | 2 | 3 | 4 | 5 | 6 | 7 | 8 | Final |
| Estonia | 1 | 1 | 1 | 1 | 1 | 0 | 2 | 0 | 7 |
| Brazil 🔨 | 0 | 0 | 0 | 0 | 0 | 4 | 0 | 4 | 8 |

| Sheet C | 1 | 2 | 3 | 4 | 5 | 6 | 7 | 8 | Final |
| Latvia 🔨 | 1 | 1 | 0 | 1 | 0 | 4 | 1 | X | 8 |
| Japan | 0 | 0 | 3 | 0 | 1 | 0 | 0 | X | 4 |

| Sheet D | 1 | 2 | 3 | 4 | 5 | 6 | 7 | 8 | Final |
| Croatia | 0 | 0 | 0 | 0 | 0 | 0 | X | X | 0 |
| Finland 🔨 | 6 | 1 | 1 | 1 | 1 | 1 | X | X | 11 |

==== Sunday, April 23 ====
Draw 7 14:30

| Sheet A | 1 | 2 | 3 | 4 | 5 | 6 | 7 | 8 | Final |
| Belarus | 0 | 2 | 0 | 1 | 1 | 0 | 0 | X | 4 |
| Latvia 🔨 | 4 | 0 | 3 | 0 | 0 | 3 | 1 | X | 11 |

| Sheet B | 1 | 2 | 3 | 4 | 5 | 6 | 7 | 8 | Final |
| Croatia | 0 | 0 | 0 | 0 | 1 | 1 | X | X | 2 |
| Hungary 🔨 | 3 | 2 | 3 | 2 | 0 | 0 | X | X | 10 |

| Sheet C | 1 | 2 | 3 | 4 | 5 | 6 | 7 | 8 | Final |
| Estonia | 0 | 1 | 3 | 0 | 0 | 1 | 1 | 0 | 6 |
| Finland 🔨 | 3 | 0 | 0 | 1 | 2 | 0 | 0 | 2 | 8 |

| Sheet D | 1 | 2 | 3 | 4 | 5 | 6 | 7 | 8 | Final |
| Brazil | 0 | 1 | 0 | 1 | 0 | 2 | 0 | X | 4 |
| Japan 🔨 | 3 | 0 | 3 | 0 | 2 | 0 | 3 | X | 11 |

Draw 9 21:00

| Sheet C | 1 | 2 | 3 | 4 | 5 | 6 | 7 | 8 | Final |
| Hungary 🔨 | 0 | 1 | 0 | 0 | 2 | 0 | 2 | 0 | 5 |
| Latvia | 1 | 0 | 2 | 1 | 0 | 1 | 0 | 1 | 6 |

==== Monday, April 24 ====
Draw 10 8:00

| Sheet E | 1 | 2 | 3 | 4 | 5 | 6 | 7 | 8 | 9 | Final |
| Belarus 🔨 | 0 | 2 | 0 | 0 | 3 | 0 | 1 | 0 | 0 | 6 |
| Estonia | 1 | 0 | 1 | 2 | 0 | 1 | 0 | 1 | 1 | 7 |

Draw 11 11:15

| Sheet E | 1 | 2 | 3 | 4 | 5 | 6 | 7 | 8 | Final |
| Latvia 🔨 | 0 | 0 | 2 | 3 | 3 | 0 | 3 | X | 11 |
| Brazil | 1 | 1 | 0 | 0 | 0 | 1 | 0 | X | 3 |

Draw 13 17:45

| Sheet A | 1 | 2 | 3 | 4 | 5 | 6 | 7 | 8 | Final |
| Brazil | 0 | 1 | 1 | 0 | 1 | 1 | 0 | 1 | 5 |
| Hungary 🔨 | 4 | 0 | 0 | 1 | 0 | 0 | 3 | 0 | 8 |

| Sheet B | 1 | 2 | 3 | 4 | 5 | 6 | 7 | 8 | Final |
| Latvia 🔨 | 2 | 0 | 0 | 0 | 3 | 2 | 0 | 3 | 10 |
| Finland | 0 | 2 | 1 | 1 | 0 | 0 | 3 | 0 | 7 |

| Sheet E | 1 | 2 | 3 | 4 | 5 | 6 | 7 | 8 | Final |
| Japan | 0 | 4 | 4 | 0 | 1 | 2 | X | X | 11 |
| Croatia 🔨 | 1 | 0 | 0 | 1 | 0 | 0 | X | X | 2 |

==== Tuesday, April 25 ====
Draw 15 8:00

| Sheet B | 1 | 2 | 3 | 4 | 5 | 6 | 7 | 8 | Final |
| Japan | 0 | 0 | 0 | 0 | 4 | 1 | 1 | 0 | 6 |
| Belarus 🔨 | 4 | 2 | 1 | 1 | 0 | 0 | 0 | 1 | 9 |

| Sheet C | 1 | 2 | 3 | 4 | 5 | 6 | 7 | 8 | Final |
| Croatia | 0 | 0 | 1 | 1 | 0 | 1 | 0 | X | 3 |
| Estonia 🔨 | 3 | 2 | 0 | 0 | 2 | 0 | 1 | X | 8 |

| Sheet E | 1 | 2 | 3 | 4 | 5 | 6 | 7 | 8 | Final |
| Hungary 🔨 | 1 | 1 | 1 | 0 | 2 | 0 | 4 | X | 9 |
| Finland | 0 | 0 | 0 | 1 | 0 | 2 | 0 | X | 3 |

Draw 17 14:30

| Sheet B | 1 | 2 | 3 | 4 | 5 | 6 | 7 | 8 | Final |
| Brazil 🔨 | 0 | 6 | 2 | 0 | 2 | 0 | 4 | X | 14 |
| Croatia | 2 | 0 | 0 | 2 | 0 | 1 | 0 | X | 5 |

| Sheet D | 1 | 2 | 3 | 4 | 5 | 6 | 7 | 8 | Final |
| Estonia | 0 | 0 | 3 | 0 | 0 | 0 | 1 | 0 | 4 |
| Latvia 🔨 | 1 | 1 | 0 | 2 | 0 | 1 | 0 | 1 | 6 |

Draw 18 17:45

| Sheet C | 1 | 2 | 3 | 4 | 5 | 6 | 7 | 8 | Final |
| Japan 🔨 | 0 | 1 | 0 | 0 | 0 | 3 | 0 | X | 4 |
| Hungary | 4 | 0 | 1 | 4 | 1 | 0 | 5 | X | 15 |

| Sheet D | 1 | 2 | 3 | 4 | 5 | 6 | 7 | 8 | Final |
| Finland | 0 | 3 | 0 | 1 | 0 | 5 | 0 | X | 9 |
| Belarus 🔨 | 2 | 0 | 1 | 0 | 1 | 0 | 2 | X | 6 |

==== Wednesday, April 26 ====
Draw 21 11:15

| Sheet A | 1 | 2 | 3 | 4 | 5 | 6 | 7 | 8 | Final |
| Finland | 0 | 0 | 2 | 2 | 0 | 2 | 0 | 2 | 8 |
| Brazil 🔨 | 2 | 1 | 0 | 0 | 1 | 0 | 3 | 0 | 7 |

Draw 22 14:30

| Sheet A | 1 | 2 | 3 | 4 | 5 | 6 | 7 | 8 | Final |
| Estonia | 0 | 1 | 2 | 0 | 3 | 0 | 0 | 0 | 6 |
| Japan 🔨 | 2 | 0 | 0 | 1 | 0 | 2 | 2 | 1 | 8 |

| Sheet E | 1 | 2 | 3 | 4 | 5 | 6 | 7 | 8 | 9 | Final |
| Croatia | 1 | 0 | 3 | 4 | 0 | 1 | 0 | 2 | 0 | 11 |
| Belarus 🔨 | 0 | 1 | 0 | 0 | 5 | 0 | 5 | 0 | 1 | 12 |

Draw 24 21:00

| Sheet A | 1 | 2 | 3 | 4 | 5 | 6 | 7 | 8 | Final |
| Latvia | 3 | 1 | 1 | 1 | 1 | 0 | X | X | 7 |
| Croatia 🔨 | 0 | 0 | 0 | 0 | 0 | 1 | X | X | 1 |

| Sheet C | 1 | 2 | 3 | 4 | 5 | 6 | 7 | 8 | Final |
| Belarus | 0 | 1 | 1 | 0 | 0 | 0 | 1 | X | 3 |
| Brazil 🔨 | 2 | 0 | 0 | 3 | 3 | 2 | 0 | X | 10 |

| Sheet D | 1 | 2 | 3 | 4 | 5 | 6 | 7 | 8 | Final |
| Hungary 🔨 | 2 | 1 | 2 | 1 | 3 | 0 | X | X | 9 |
| Estonia | 0 | 0 | 0 | 0 | 0 | 4 | X | X | 4 |

==== Thursday, April 27 ====
Draw 25 8:00

| Sheet A | 1 | 2 | 3 | 4 | 5 | 6 | 7 | 8 | Final |
| Finland 🔨 | 2 | 0 | 1 | 0 | 1 | 0 | 1 | 1 | 6 |
| Japan | 0 | 1 | 0 | 1 | 0 | 2 | 0 | 0 | 4 |

=== Group B ===
==== Saturday, April 22 ====
Draw 3 15:00

| Sheet A | 1 | 2 | 3 | 4 | 5 | 6 | 7 | 8 | Final |
| Denmark | 2 | 2 | 0 | 2 | 1 | 2 | 2 | X | 11 |
| Bulgaria 🔨 | 0 | 0 | 1 | 0 | 0 | 0 | 0 | X | 1 |

| Sheet B | 1 | 2 | 3 | 4 | 5 | 6 | 7 | 8 | Final |
| Wales | 5 | 0 | 0 | 2 | 1 | 0 | 3 | X | 11 |
| Serbia 🔨 | 0 | 1 | 1 | 0 | 0 | 1 | 0 | X | 3 |

| Sheet D | 1 | 2 | 3 | 4 | 5 | 6 | 7 | 8 | Final |
| Norway | 0 | 0 | 2 | 1 | 0 | 0 | 0 | X | 3 |
| Scotland 🔨 | 2 | 1 | 0 | 0 | 1 | 1 | 1 | X | 6 |

Draw 4 8:00

| Sheet D | 1 | 2 | 3 | 4 | 5 | 6 | 7 | 8 | Final |
| Ireland | 1 | 1 | 1 | 0 | 1 | 0 | 0 | 0 | 4 |
| Italy 🔨 | 0 | 0 | 0 | 1 | 0 | 1 | 1 | 2 | 5 |

==== Sunday, April 23 ====
Draw 5 8:00

| Sheet B | 1 | 2 | 3 | 4 | 5 | 6 | 7 | 8 | Final |
| Bulgaria | 0 | 1 | 0 | 0 | 1 | 1 | X | X | 3 |
| Scotland 🔨 | 5 | 0 | 3 | 2 | 0 | 0 | X | X | 10 |

| Sheet C | 1 | 2 | 3 | 4 | 5 | 6 | 7 | 8 | Final |
| Wales | 0 | 0 | 2 | 0 | 0 | 0 | 0 | X | 2 |
| Norway 🔨 | 1 | 1 | 0 | 1 | 1 | 1 | 1 | X | 6 |

| Sheet D | 1 | 2 | 3 | 4 | 5 | 6 | 7 | 8 | Final |
| Serbia | 0 | 0 | 1 | 0 | 0 | 0 | 1 | X | 2 |
| Ireland 🔨 | 2 | 2 | 0 | 1 | 4 | 1 | 0 | X | 10 |

| Sheet E | 1 | 2 | 3 | 4 | 5 | 6 | 7 | 8 | Final |
| Denmark | 0 | 2 | 0 | 0 | 1 | 0 | 0 | X | 3 |
| Italy 🔨 | 0 | 0 | 2 | 2 | 0 | 4 | 2 | X | 10 |

==== Monday, April 24 ====
Draw 11 11:15

| Sheet B | 1 | 2 | 3 | 4 | 5 | 6 | 7 | 8 | Final |
| Norway 🔨 | 0 | 1 | 1 | 0 | 0 | 2 | 0 | 1 | 5 |
| Italy | 1 | 0 | 0 | 1 | 1 | 0 | 1 | 0 | 4 |

Draw 12 14:30

| Sheet A | 1 | 2 | 3 | 4 | 5 | 6 | 7 | 8 | Final |
| Ireland | 0 | 0 | 1 | 1 | 1 | 0 | 2 | 0 | 5 |
| Scotland 🔨 | 2 | 1 | 0 | 0 | 0 | 3 | 0 | 2 | 8 |

| Sheet C | 1 | 2 | 3 | 4 | 5 | 6 | 7 | 8 | Final |
| Denmark | 3 | 0 | 0 | 0 | 2 | 0 | 2 | X | 7 |
| Wales 🔨 | 0 | 4 | 2 | 2 | 0 | 1 | 0 | X | 9 |

Draw 14 21:00

| Sheet C | 1 | 2 | 3 | 4 | 5 | 6 | 7 | 8 | Final |
| Serbia | 0 | 0 | 0 | 0 | 0 | 1 | X | X | 1 |
| Bulgaria 🔨 | 3 | 2 | 3 | 2 | 2 | 0 | X | X | 12 |

==== Tuesday, April 25 ====
Draw 16 11:15

| Sheet A | 1 | 2 | 3 | 4 | 5 | 6 | 7 | 8 | Final |
| Bulgaria | 0 | 0 | 0 | 0 | 0 | 1 | X | X | 1 |
| Norway 🔨 | 3 | 1 | 1 | 2 | 2 | 0 | X | X | 9 |

| Sheet B | 1 | 2 | 3 | 4 | 5 | 6 | 7 | 8 | Final |
| Ireland 🔨 | 1 | 1 | 1 | 1 | 2 | 0 | 0 | 1 | 7 |
| Denmark | 0 | 0 | 0 | 0 | 0 | 1 | 2 | 0 | 3 |

| Sheet D | 1 | 2 | 3 | 4 | 5 | 6 | 7 | 8 | Final |
| Scotland 🔨 | 4 | 0 | 3 | 2 | 0 | 2 | X | X | 11 |
| Wales | 0 | 1 | 0 | 0 | 1 | 0 | X | X | 2 |

Draw 18 17:45

| Sheet A | 1 | 2 | 3 | 4 | 5 | 6 | 7 | 8 | Final |
| Wales | 0 | 5 | 0 | 1 | 2 | 0 | 0 | 0 | 8 |
| Italy 🔨 | 1 | 0 | 1 | 0 | 0 | 4 | 2 | 1 | 9 |

| Sheet E | 1 | 2 | 3 | 4 | 5 | 6 | 7 | 8 | Final |
| Scotland 🔨 | 2 | 1 | 1 | 2 | 4 | 1 | X | X | 11 |
| Serbia | 0 | 0 | 0 | 0 | 0 | 0 | X | X | 0 |

Draw 19 21:00

| Sheet C | 1 | 2 | 3 | 4 | 5 | 6 | 7 | 8 | Final |
| Bulgaria | 0 | 0 | 1 | 0 | 0 | 3 | 0 | X | 4 |
| Ireland 🔨 | 5 | 1 | 0 | 1 | 1 | 0 | 3 | X | 11 |

==== Wednesday, April 26 ====
Draw 20 8:00

| Sheet A | 1 | 2 | 3 | 4 | 5 | 6 | 7 | 8 | Final |
| Italy 🔨 | 1 | 2 | 0 | 1 | 2 | 1 | 2 | X | 9 |
| Serbia | 0 | 0 | 1 | 0 | 0 | 0 | 0 | X | 1 |

| Sheet C | 1 | 2 | 3 | 4 | 5 | 6 | 7 | 8 | Final |
| Norway 🔨 | 2 | 1 | 0 | 1 | 0 | 1 | 0 | 1 | 6 |
| Denmark | 0 | 0 | 1 | 0 | 2 | 0 | 2 | 0 | 5 |

Draw 22 14:30

| Sheet D | 1 | 2 | 3 | 4 | 5 | 6 | 7 | 8 | Final |
| Italy 🔨 | 2 | 2 | 0 | 0 | 2 | 1 | 0 | X | 7 |
| Bulgaria | 0 | 0 | 1 | 1 | 0 | 0 | 1 | X | 3 |

Draw 23 17:45

| Sheet A | 1 | 2 | 3 | 4 | 5 | 6 | 7 | 8 | Final |
| Scotland | 3 | 2 | 1 | 0 | 2 | 0 | X | X | 8 |
| Denmark 🔨 | 0 | 0 | 0 | 1 | 0 | 1 | X | X | 2 |

| Sheet E | 1 | 2 | 3 | 4 | 5 | 6 | 7 | 8 | Final |
| Serbia | 0 | 0 | 1 | 1 | 0 | 0 | 0 | X | 2 |
| Norway 🔨 | 3 | 3 | 0 | 0 | 4 | 1 | 2 | X | 13 |

Draw 24 21:00

| Sheet E | 1 | 2 | 3 | 4 | 5 | 6 | 7 | 8 | Final |
| Ireland 🔨 | 3 | 2 | 1 | 3 | 0 | 0 | X | X | 9 |
| Wales | 0 | 0 | 0 | 0 | 0 | 2 | X | X | 2 |

==== Thursday, April 27 ====
Draw 26 11:15

| Sheet D | 1 | 2 | 3 | 4 | 5 | 6 | 7 | 8 | Final |
| Denmark 🔨 | 4 | 0 | 1 | 4 | 2 | 0 | 2 | X | 13 |
| Serbia | 0 | 5 | 0 | 0 | 0 | 1 | 0 | X | 6 |

| Sheet E | 1 | 2 | 3 | 4 | 5 | 6 | 7 | 8 | Final |
| Norway | 1 | 0 | 2 | 0 | 4 | 0 | 3 | X | 10 |
| Ireland 🔨 | 0 | 2 | 0 | 1 | 0 | 1 | 0 | X | 4 |

Draw 27 14:30

| Sheet C | 1 | 2 | 3 | 4 | 5 | 6 | 7 | 8 | Final |
| Italy | 0 | 0 | 2 | 1 | 0 | 1 | 0 | 0 | 4 |
| Scotland 🔨 | 1 | 2 | 0 | 0 | 2 | 0 | 2 | 1 | 8 |

| Sheet E | Final |
| Wales | L |
| Bulgaria | W |

Wales forfeited their match against Bulgaria

=== Group C ===
==== Saturday, April 22 ====
Draw 3 15:00

| Sheet C | 1 | 2 | 3 | 4 | 5 | 6 | 7 | 8 | Final |
| Poland | 0 | 3 | 0 | 0 | 2 | 0 | 4 | X | 9 |
| Netherlands 🔨 | 1 | 0 | 1 | 2 | 0 | 1 | 0 | X | 5 |

Draw 4 20:00

| Sheet A | 1 | 2 | 3 | 4 | 5 | 6 | 7 | 8 | Final |
| South Korea 🔨 | 0 | 2 | 1 | 1 | 0 | 2 | 2 | X | 8 |
| Australia | 1 | 0 | 0 | 0 | 0 | 0 | 0 | X | 1 |

| Sheet B | 1 | 2 | 3 | 4 | 5 | 6 | 7 | 8 | Final |
| Austria 🔨 | 4 | 0 | 2 | 1 | 1 | 0 | 1 | X | 9 |
| Israel | 0 | 1 | 0 | 0 | 0 | 1 | 0 | X | 2 |

| Sheet C | 1 | 2 | 3 | 4 | 5 | 6 | 7 | 8 | Final |
| Sweden 🔨 | 0 | 1 | 2 | 0 | 0 | 1 | 0 | 0 | 4 |
| China | 1 | 0 | 0 | 3 | 1 | 0 | 1 | 2 | 8 |

==== Sunday, April 23 ====
Draw 6 11:15

| Sheet A | 1 | 2 | 3 | 4 | 5 | 6 | 7 | 8 | Final |
| Israel | 0 | 0 | 1 | 0 | 0 | 1 | X | X | 2 |
| China 🔨 | 4 | 2 | 0 | 6 | 1 | 0 | X | X | 13 |

| Sheet B | 1 | 2 | 3 | 4 | 5 | 6 | 7 | 8 | Final |
| Australia 🔨 | 1 | 0 | 5 | 0 | 0 | 2 | 1 | X | 9 |
| Netherlands | 0 | 3 | 0 | 1 | 1 | 0 | 0 | X | 5 |

| Sheet C | 1 | 2 | 3 | 4 | 5 | 6 | 7 | 8 | Final |
| Austria | 1 | 2 | 0 | 0 | 3 | 0 | 4 | X | 10 |
| Poland 🔨 | 0 | 0 | 1 | 1 | 0 | 1 | 0 | X | 3 |

| Sheet D | 1 | 2 | 3 | 4 | 5 | 6 | 7 | 8 | Final |
| South Korea 🔨 | 2 | 0 | 1 | 0 | 1 | 0 | 1 | 1 | 6 |
| Sweden | 0 | 1 | 0 | 1 | 0 | 3 | 0 | 0 | 5 |

Draw 8 17:45

| Sheet E | 1 | 2 | 3 | 4 | 5 | 6 | 7 | 8 | Final |
| South Korea 🔨 | 1 | 0 | 0 | 0 | 3 | 0 | 1 | 2 | 7 |
| Austria | 0 | 1 | 1 | 1 | 0 | 2 | 0 | 0 | 5 |

Draw 9 21:00

| Sheet A | 1 | 2 | 3 | 4 | 5 | 6 | 7 | 8 | Final |
| Poland | 1 | 0 | 0 | 0 | 0 | 1 | X | X | 2 |
| Sweden 🔨 | 0 | 5 | 3 | 3 | 2 | 0 | X | X | 13 |

| Sheet E | 1 | 2 | 3 | 4 | 5 | 6 | 7 | 8 | Final |
| Israel | 0 | 0 | 0 | 3 | 0 | 0 | 0 | X | 3 |
| Australia 🔨 | 1 | 1 | 3 | 0 | 1 | 1 | 1 | X | 8 |

==== Monday, April 24 ====
Draw 12 14:30

| Sheet E | 1 | 2 | 3 | 4 | 5 | 6 | 7 | 8 | Final |
| Netherlands 🔨 | 1 | 0 | 0 | 0 | 0 | 1 | 0 | X | 2 |
| China | 0 | 5 | 2 | 2 | 4 | 0 | 1 | X | 14 |

Draw 13 17:45

| Sheet D | 1 | 2 | 3 | 4 | 5 | 6 | 7 | 8 | 9 | Final |
| Australia 🔨 | 2 | 0 | 0 | 0 | 0 | 1 | 1 | 3 | 0 | 7 |
| Poland | 0 | 1 | 1 | 4 | 1 | 0 | 0 | 0 | 1 | 8 |

Draw 14 21:00

| Sheet A | 1 | 2 | 3 | 4 | 5 | 6 | 7 | 8 | Final |
| Austria | 1 | 2 | 0 | 1 | 0 | 2 | 1 | X | 7 |
| Netherlands 🔨 | 0 | 0 | 2 | 0 | 1 | 0 | 0 | X | 3 |

| Sheet B | 1 | 2 | 3 | 4 | 5 | 6 | 7 | 8 | Final |
| South Korea 🔨 | 2 | 2 | 1 | 0 | 0 | 4 | X | X | 9 |
| China | 0 | 0 | 0 | 1 | 2 | 0 | X | X | 3 |

| Sheet E | 1 | 2 | 3 | 4 | 5 | 6 | 7 | 8 | Final |
| Sweden 🔨 | 3 | 3 | 0 | 1 | 0 | 4 | 3 | X | 14 |
| Israel | 0 | 0 | 1 | 0 | 2 | 0 | 0 | X | 3 |

==== Tuesday, April 25 ====
Draw 16 11:15

| Sheet C | 1 | 2 | 3 | 4 | 5 | 6 | 7 | 8 | Final |
| Netherlands | 0 | 1 | 0 | 2 | 0 | 1 | 0 | 0 | 4 |
| Israel 🔨 | 1 | 0 | 2 | 0 | 3 | 0 | 2 | 2 | 10 |

| Sheet E | 1 | 2 | 3 | 4 | 5 | 6 | 7 | 8 | Final |
| Austria | 0 | 1 | 0 | 1 | 0 | 4 | 0 | 0 | 6 |
| Sweden 🔨 | 3 | 0 | 1 | 0 | 1 | 0 | 2 | 1 | 8 |

Draw 17 14:30

| Sheet C | 1 | 2 | 3 | 4 | 5 | 6 | 7 | 8 | Final |
| China 🔨 | 1 | 0 | 1 | 0 | 2 | 0 | 2 | 1 | 7 |
| Australia | 0 | 1 | 0 | 3 | 0 | 2 | 0 | 0 | 6 |

| Sheet E | 1 | 2 | 3 | 4 | 5 | 6 | 7 | 8 | Final |
| Poland | 0 | 0 | 1 | 0 | 0 | 0 | X | X | 1 |
| South Korea 🔨 | 3 | 3 | 0 | 2 | 1 | 2 | X | X | 11 |

==== Wednesday, April 26 ====
Draw 20 8:00

| Sheet B | 1 | 2 | 3 | 4 | 5 | 6 | 7 | 8 | Final |
| Netherlands | 0 | 0 | 0 | 0 | 1 | 0 | 0 | X | 1 |
| South Korea 🔨 | 4 | 1 | 3 | 2 | 0 | 2 | 2 | X | 14 |

| Sheet D | 1 | 2 | 3 | 4 | 5 | 6 | 7 | 8 | Final |
| China | 1 | 1 | 2 | 0 | 3 | 0 | 2 | X | 9 |
| Austria 🔨 | 0 | 0 | 0 | 1 | 0 | 2 | 0 | X | 3 |

Draw 21 11:15

| Sheet D | 1 | 2 | 3 | 4 | 5 | 6 | 7 | 8 | Final |
| Poland | 2 | 0 | 0 | 0 | 3 | 0 | 3 | 0 | 8 |
| Israel 🔨 | 0 | 1 | 2 | 1 | 0 | 2 | 0 | 3 | 9 |

Draw 22 14:30

| Sheet B | 1 | 2 | 3 | 4 | 5 | 6 | 7 | 8 | Final |
| Sweden 🔨 | 2 | 0 | 1 | 0 | 4 | 2 | 3 | X | 12 |
| Australia | 0 | 1 | 0 | 3 | 0 | 0 | 0 | X | 4 |

==== Thursday, April 27 ====
Draw 25 8:00

| Sheet B | 1 | 2 | 3 | 4 | 5 | 6 | 7 | 8 | Final |
| China 🔨 | 2 | 0 | 1 | 0 | 4 | 0 | 2 | X | 9 |
| Poland | 0 | 1 | 0 | 1 | 0 | 1 | 0 | X | 3 |

| Sheet C | 1 | 2 | 3 | 4 | 5 | 6 | 7 | 8 | Final |
| Israel 🔨 | 2 | 2 | 0 | 1 | 0 | 3 | 0 | 0 | 8 |
| South Korea | 0 | 0 | 4 | 0 | 1 | 0 | 3 | 1 | 9 |

| Sheet D | 1 | 2 | 3 | 4 | 5 | 6 | 7 | 8 | Final |
| Sweden | 1 | 0 | 3 | 2 | 1 | 0 | 1 | X | 8 |
| Netherlands 🔨 | 0 | 1 | 0 | 0 | 0 | 1 | 0 | X | 2 |

Draw 26 11:15

| Sheet A | 1 | 2 | 3 | 4 | 5 | 6 | 7 | 8 | Final |
| Australia 🔨 | 0 | 3 | 0 | 1 | 2 | 0 | 2 | 1 | 9 |
| Austria | 1 | 0 | 2 | 0 | 0 | 2 | 0 | 0 | 5 |

=== Group D ===
==== Saturday, April 22 ====
Draw 1 8:00

| Sheet E | 1 | 2 | 3 | 4 | 5 | 6 | 7 | 8 | Final |
| Czech Republic 🔨 | 2 | 0 | 0 | 2 | 1 | 1 | 1 | 0 | 7 |
| Germany | 0 | 2 | 1 | 0 | 0 | 0 | 0 | 2 | 5 |

Draw 2 11:15

| Sheet D | 1 | 2 | 3 | 4 | 5 | 6 | 7 | 8 | Final |
| England | 0 | 0 | 3 | 3 | 0 | 1 | 0 | 1 | 8 |
| France 🔨 | 1 | 1 | 0 | 0 | 2 | 0 | 1 | 0 | 5 |

| Sheet E | 1 | 2 | 3 | 4 | 5 | 6 | 7 | 8 | Final |
| Turkey | 1 | 0 | 0 | 1 | 0 | 2 | 0 | X | 4 |
| Canada 🔨 | 0 | 5 | 1 | 0 | 2 | 0 | 2 | X | 10 |

Draw 3 15:00

| Sheet E | 1 | 2 | 3 | 4 | 5 | 6 | 7 | 8 | Final |
| Kazakhstan | 0 | 0 | 0 | 0 | 1 | 0 | 0 | X | 1 |
| United States 🔨 | 2 | 3 | 4 | 2 | 0 | 1 | 1 | X | 13 |

==== Sunday, April 23 ====
Draw 5 8:00

| Sheet A | 1 | 2 | 3 | 4 | 5 | 6 | 7 | 8 | Final |
| Kazakhstan | 1 | 0 | 0 | 0 | 1 | 0 | X | X | 2 |
| England 🔨 | 0 | 5 | 3 | 3 | 0 | 6 | X | X | 17 |

Draw 8 17:45

| Sheet A | 1 | 2 | 3 | 4 | 5 | 6 | 7 | 8 | Final |
| France | 0 | 1 | 0 | 0 | 0 | 0 | X | X | 1 |
| Canada 🔨 | 2 | 0 | 3 | 2 | 1 | 1 | X | X | 9 |

| Sheet B | 1 | 2 | 3 | 4 | 5 | 6 | 7 | 8 | Final |
| Kazakhstan | 2 | 0 | 1 | 0 | 0 | 0 | 0 | X | 3 |
| Germany 🔨 | 0 | 1 | 0 | 3 | 2 | 1 | 1 | X | 8 |

| Sheet C | 1 | 2 | 3 | 4 | 5 | 6 | 7 | 8 | Final |
| England 🔨 | 1 | 0 | 0 | 1 | 0 | 0 | 0 | X | 2 |
| United States | 0 | 3 | 1 | 0 | 1 | 1 | 1 | X | 7 |

| Sheet D | 1 | 2 | 3 | 4 | 5 | 6 | 7 | 8 | Final |
| Turkey 🔨 | 0 | 0 | 2 | 1 | 1 | 0 | 1 | 0 | 5 |
| Czech Republic | 1 | 1 | 0 | 0 | 0 | 2 | 0 | 4 | 8 |

==== Monday, April 24 ====
Draw 10 8:00

| Sheet A | 1 | 2 | 3 | 4 | 5 | 6 | 7 | 8 | Final |
| United States 🔨 | 3 | 3 | 1 | 2 | 0 | 4 | X | X | 13 |
| Turkey | 0 | 0 | 0 | 0 | 3 | 0 | X | X | 3 |

| Sheet B | 1 | 2 | 3 | 4 | 5 | 6 | 7 | 8 | Final |
| Czech Republic | 1 | 0 | 3 | 0 | 1 | 1 | 0 | X | 6 |
| England 🔨 | 0 | 2 | 0 | 1 | 0 | 0 | 1 | X | 4 |

| Sheet C | 1 | 2 | 3 | 4 | 5 | 6 | 7 | 8 | Final |
| France | 1 | 0 | 1 | 1 | 0 | 1 | 0 | 1 | 5 |
| Germany 🔨 | 0 | 1 | 0 | 0 | 4 | 0 | 2 | 0 | 7 |

| Sheet D | 1 | 2 | 3 | 4 | 5 | 6 | 7 | 8 | Final |
| Canada 🔨 | 2 | 3 | 1 | 3 | 2 | 3 | X | X | 14 |
| Kazakhstan | 0 | 0 | 0 | 0 | 0 | 0 | X | X | 0 |

Draw 12 14:30

| Sheet B | 1 | 2 | 3 | 4 | 5 | 6 | 7 | 8 | 9 | Final |
| Turkey | 3 | 1 | 2 | 0 | 3 | 0 | 0 | 0 | 0 | 9 |
| France 🔨 | 0 | 0 | 0 | 5 | 0 | 1 | 1 | 2 | 1 | 10 |

| Sheet D | 1 | 2 | 3 | 4 | 5 | 6 | 7 | 8 | Final |
| Germany | 0 | 0 | 1 | 0 | 0 | 0 | 0 | X | 1 |
| United States 🔨 | 2 | 2 | 0 | 1 | 2 | 2 | 1 | X | 10 |

Draw 13 17:45

| Sheet C | 1 | 2 | 3 | 4 | 5 | 6 | 7 | 8 | Final |
| Czech Republic 🔨 | 0 | 1 | 1 | 1 | 0 | 3 | 0 | 1 | 7 |
| Canada | 1 | 0 | 0 | 0 | 1 | 0 | 3 | 0 | 5 |

==== Tuesday, April 25 ====
Draw 19 21:00

| Sheet A | 1 | 2 | 3 | 4 | 5 | 6 | 7 | 8 | Final |
| Canada | 1 | 0 | 1 | 0 | 1 | 0 | 4 | 3 | 10 |
| Germany 🔨 | 0 | 1 | 0 | 3 | 0 | 2 | 0 | 0 | 6 |

| Sheet B | 1 | 2 | 3 | 4 | 5 | 6 | 7 | 8 | Final |
| France 🔨 | 0 | 0 | 1 | 0 | 1 | 0 | 3 | 3 | 8 |
| Kazakhstan | 1 | 1 | 0 | 2 | 0 | 2 | 0 | 0 | 6 |

| Sheet D | 1 | 2 | 3 | 4 | 5 | 6 | 7 | 8 | Final |
| United States 🔨 | 1 | 0 | 1 | 0 | 3 | 0 | 2 | X | 7 |
| Czech Republic | 0 | 2 | 0 | 1 | 0 | 1 | 0 | X | 4 |

| Sheet E | 1 | 2 | 3 | 4 | 5 | 6 | 7 | 8 | Final |
| England | 0 | 2 | 1 | 0 | 2 | 0 | 3 | 2 | 10 |
| Turkey 🔨 | 1 | 0 | 0 | 2 | 0 | 2 | 0 | 0 | 5 |

==== Wednesday, April 26 ====
Draw 21 11:15

| Sheet B | 1 | 2 | 3 | 4 | 5 | 6 | 7 | 8 | Final |
| England 🔨 | 1 | 0 | 0 | 2 | 1 | 2 | 0 | 0 | 6 |
| Canada | 0 | 3 | 1 | 0 | 0 | 0 | 2 | 1 | 7 |

| Sheet C | 1 | 2 | 3 | 4 | 5 | 6 | 7 | 8 | Final |
| Kazakhstan | 0 | 0 | 0 | 1 | 0 | 0 | X | X | 1 |
| Czech Republic 🔨 | 4 | 1 | 5 | 0 | 3 | 1 | X | X | 14 |

| Sheet E | 1 | 2 | 3 | 4 | 5 | 6 | 7 | 8 | Final |
| United States 🔨 | 0 | 3 | 0 | 4 | 0 | 0 | 2 | X | 9 |
| France | 1 | 0 | 1 | 0 | 2 | 1 | 0 | X | 5 |

Draw 22 14:30

| Sheet C | 1 | 2 | 3 | 4 | 5 | 6 | 7 | 8 | Final |
| Germany | 1 | 1 | 1 | 0 | 0 | 1 | 0 | 0 | 4 |
| Turkey 🔨 | 0 | 0 | 0 | 2 | 1 | 0 | 4 | 1 | 8 |

Draw 24 21:00

| Sheet B | 1 | 2 | 3 | 4 | 5 | 6 | 7 | 8 | Final |
| Turkey 🔨 | 3 | 0 | 4 | 3 | 0 | 2 | 1 | X | 13 |
| Kazakhstan | 0 | 1 | 0 | 0 | 2 | 0 | 0 | X | 3 |

==== Thursday, April 27 ====
Draw 25 8:00

| Sheet E | 1 | 2 | 3 | 4 | 5 | 6 | 7 | 8 | Final |
| Germany 🔨 | 2 | 0 | 0 | 3 | 0 | 0 | 1 | 0 | 6 |
| England | 0 | 2 | 1 | 0 | 3 | 2 | 0 | 1 | 9 |

Draw 27 14:30

| Sheet A | 1 | 2 | 3 | 4 | 5 | 6 | 7 | 8 | Final |
| Czech Republic 🔨 | 5 | 0 | 1 | 1 | 0 | 4 | X | X | 11 |
| France | 0 | 1 | 0 | 0 | 2 | 0 | X | X | 3 |

| Sheet B | 1 | 2 | 3 | 4 | 5 | 6 | 7 | 8 | Final |
| Canada | 0 | 2 | 2 | 0 | 1 | 0 | 1 | 0 | 6 |
| United States 🔨 | 4 | 0 | 0 | 2 | 0 | 1 | 0 | 1 | 8 |

=== Group E ===
==== Saturday, April 22 ====
Draw 2 11:15

| Sheet A | 1 | 2 | 3 | 4 | 5 | 6 | 7 | 8 | Final |
| New Zealand | 0 | 0 | 0 | 4 | 0 | 0 | 0 | X | 4 |
| Slovenia 🔨 | 1 | 2 | 1 | 0 | 2 | 2 | 2 | X | 10 |

| Sheet B | 1 | 2 | 3 | 4 | 5 | 6 | 7 | 8 | Final |
| Russia 🔨 | 0 | 0 | 1 | 1 | 2 | 0 | 5 | X | 9 |
| Spain | 1 | 1 | 0 | 0 | 0 | 2 | 0 | X | 4 |

| Sheet C | 1 | 2 | 3 | 4 | 5 | 6 | 7 | 8 | Final |
| Switzerland 🔨 | 2 | 3 | 0 | 0 | 4 | 0 | 0 | X | 9 |
| Slovakia | 0 | 0 | 1 | 2 | 0 | 1 | 1 | X | 5 |

Draw 4 20:00

| Sheet E | 1 | 2 | 3 | 4 | 5 | 6 | 7 | 8 | Final |
| Switzerland 🔨 | 0 | 5 | 0 | 2 | 2 | 0 | 2 | X | 11 |
| Romania | 1 | 0 | 2 | 0 | 0 | 3 | 0 | X | 6 |

==== Sunday, April 23 ====
Draw 6 11:15

| Sheet E | 1 | 2 | 3 | 4 | 5 | 6 | 7 | 8 | Final |
| New Zealand | 0 | 0 | 0 | 3 | 2 | 0 | 1 | X | 6 |
| Spain 🔨 | 2 | 2 | 2 | 0 | 0 | 2 | 0 | X | 8 |

Draw 7 14:30

| Sheet E | 1 | 2 | 3 | 4 | 5 | 6 | 7 | 8 | Final |
| Slovenia 🔨 | 0 | 0 | 0 | 0 | 1 | 0 | X | X | 1 |
| Slovakia | 1 | 2 | 2 | 1 | 0 | 2 | X | X | 8 |

Draw 9 21:00

| Sheet B | 1 | 2 | 3 | 4 | 5 | 6 | 7 | 8 | Final |
| Romania | 0 | 0 | 0 | 1 | 0 | 3 | X | X | 4 |
| New Zealand 🔨 | 5 | 3 | 1 | 0 | 4 | 0 | X | X | 13 |

| Sheet D | 1 | 2 | 3 | 4 | 5 | 6 | 7 | 8 | Final |
| Switzerland 🔨 | 1 | 1 | 0 | 2 | 1 | 0 | 0 | 2 | 7 |
| Russia | 0 | 0 | 2 | 0 | 0 | 2 | 1 | 0 | 5 |

==== Monday, April 24 ====
Draw 11 11:15

| Sheet A | 1 | 2 | 3 | 4 | 5 | 6 | 7 | 8 | Final |
| Romania | 0 | 0 | 0 | 0 | 2 | 0 | X | X | 2 |
| Russia 🔨 | 3 | 1 | 1 | 3 | 0 | 5 | X | X | 13 |

| Sheet C | 1 | 2 | 3 | 4 | 5 | 6 | 7 | 8 | Final |
| Spain | 1 | 0 | 0 | 0 | 0 | 3 | 0 | 2 | 6 |
| Slovenia 🔨 | 0 | 1 | 1 | 1 | 1 | 0 | 1 | 0 | 5 |

| Sheet D | 1 | 2 | 3 | 4 | 5 | 6 | 7 | 8 | Final |
| Slovakia | 0 | 0 | 1 | 0 | 1 | 0 | 1 | X | 3 |
| New Zealand 🔨 | 1 | 2 | 0 | 1 | 0 | 4 | 0 | X | 8 |

==== Tuesday, April 25 ====
Draw 15 8:00

| Sheet A | 1 | 2 | 3 | 4 | 5 | 6 | 7 | 8 | Final |
| Slovakia | 3 | 2 | 0 | 4 | 0 | 0 | 1 | X | 10 |
| Romania 🔨 | 0 | 0 | 1 | 0 | 1 | 2 | 0 | X | 4 |

| Sheet D | 1 | 2 | 3 | 4 | 5 | 6 | 7 | 8 | Final |
| Russia 🔨 | 4 | 1 | 3 | 0 | 1 | 1 | X | X | 10 |
| Slovenia | 0 | 0 | 0 | 1 | 0 | 0 | X | X | 1 |

Draw 17 14:30

| Sheet A | 1 | 2 | 3 | 4 | 5 | 6 | 7 | 8 | Final |
| Spain | 0 | 2 | 1 | 0 | 1 | 0 | 0 | X | 4 |
| Switzerland 🔨 | 3 | 0 | 0 | 1 | 0 | 3 | 2 | X | 9 |

==== Wednesday, April 26 ====
Draw 20 8:00

| Sheet E | 1 | 2 | 3 | 4 | 5 | 6 | 7 | 8 | 9 | Final |
| Slovakia | 0 | 1 | 0 | 3 | 1 | 0 | 2 | 1 | 0 | 8 |
| Russia 🔨 | 3 | 0 | 2 | 0 | 0 | 3 | 0 | 0 | 1 | 9 |

Draw 23 17:45

| Sheet B | 1 | 2 | 3 | 4 | 5 | 6 | 7 | 8 | Final |
| Slovenia | 0 | 0 | 0 | 0 | 0 | 4 | X | X | 4 |
| Switzerland 🔨 | 4 | 3 | 4 | 1 | 1 | 0 | X | X | 13 |

| Sheet C | 1 | 2 | 3 | 4 | 5 | 6 | 7 | 8 | Final |
| Russia 🔨 | 1 | 2 | 0 | 3 | 0 | 0 | 2 | X | 8 |
| New Zealand | 0 | 0 | 1 | 0 | 1 | 2 | 0 | X | 4 |

| Sheet D | 1 | 2 | 3 | 4 | 5 | 6 | 7 | 8 | Final |
| Romania | 0 | 0 | 0 | 2 | 2 | 1 | 0 | X | 5 |
| Spain 🔨 | 3 | 2 | 2 | 0 | 0 | 0 | 4 | X | 11 |

==== Thursday, April 27 ====
Draw 26 11:15

| Sheet B | 1 | 2 | 3 | 4 | 5 | 6 | 7 | 8 | Final |
| Spain | 1 | 1 | 0 | 3 | 0 | 3 | 0 | X | 8 |
| Slovakia 🔨 | 0 | 0 | 1 | 0 | 1 | 0 | 3 | X | 5 |

| Sheet C | 1 | 2 | 3 | 4 | 5 | 6 | 7 | 8 | Final |
| Slovenia | 2 | 2 | 0 | 1 | 0 | 2 | 0 | X | 7 |
| Romania 🔨 | 0 | 0 | 1 | 0 | 2 | 0 | 1 | X | 4 |

Draw 27 14:30

| Sheet D | 1 | 2 | 3 | 4 | 5 | 6 | 7 | 8 | Final |
| New Zealand | 0 | 2 | 0 | 1 | 0 | 0 | 1 | X | 4 |
| Switzerland 🔨 | 3 | 0 | 1 | 0 | 2 | 1 | 0 | X | 7 |

== Playoffs ==
Round of 16
1 | South Korea | 6
16 | Ireland | 3
8 | Russia | 3
9 | China | 8
4 | Scotland | 3
13 | Canada | 8
5 | Latvia | 6
12 | Sweden | 4
2 | United States | 5
15 | Finland | 6
7 | Czech Republic | 8
10 | Hungary | 6
3 | Switzerland | 8
14 | Spain | 5
6 | Norway | 9
11 | Italy | 5

Quarterfinals
1 | South Korea | 2
9 | China | 8
13 | Canada | 10
5 | Latvia | 5
15 | Finland | 5
7 | Czech Republic | 6
3 | Switzerland | 8
6 | Norway | 4

Semifinals
9 | China | 4
13 | Canada | 5
7 | Czech Republic | 6
3 | Switzerland | 7

Gold Medal Game
13 | Canada | 5
3 | Switzerland | 6

| Bronze Medal Game |
| 9 | China | 6 |
| 7 | Czech Republic | 2 |

5th–8th Semi
1 | South Korea | 8
5 | Latvia | 2
15 | Finland | 4
6 | Norway | 6

5 v 6
1 | South Korea | 2
6 | Norway | 9

| 7 v 8 |
| 5 | Latvia | 1 |
| 15 | Finland | 7 |

9th–16th Quarter
4 | Scotland | 9
12 | Sweden | 2
16 | Ireland | 5
8 | Russia | 7
2 | United States | 11
10 | Hungary | 0
14 | Spain | 5
11 | Italy | 8

9th–12th Semi
4 | Scotland | 5
8 | Russia | 6
2 | United States | 7
11 | Italy | 4

9 v 10
8 | Russia | 7
2 | United States | 5

| 11 v 12 |
| 4 | Scotland | 7 |
| 11 | Italy | 5 |

=== Round of 16 ===
Friday, April 28, 9:00

| Sheet A | 1 | 2 | 3 | 4 | 5 | 6 | 7 | 8 | Final |
| Russia | 0 | 1 | 0 | 0 | 2 | 0 | 0 | X | 3 |
| China 🔨 | 3 | 0 | 1 | 2 | 0 | 1 | 1 | X | 8 |

Player percentages
| Russia | | China | |
|---|---|---|---|
| Anastasia Bryzgalova | 92% | Rui Wang | 80% |
| Aleksandr Krushelnitckii | 67% | Ba Dexin | 93% |
| Total | 82% | Total | 88% |

| Sheet C | 1 | 2 | 3 | 4 | 5 | 6 | 7 | 8 | Final |
| Latvia 🔨 | 2 | 0 | 1 | 1 | 1 | 0 | 1 | X | 6 |
| Sweden | 0 | 3 | 0 | 0 | 0 | 1 | 0 | X | 4 |

Player percentages
| Latvia | | Sweden | |
|---|---|---|---|
| Santa Blumberga | 77% | Camilla Noreen | 79% |
| Andris Bremanis | 85% | Per Noreen | 92% |
| Total | 82% | Total | 87% |

| Sheet D | 1 | 2 | 3 | 4 | 5 | 6 | 7 | 8 | Final |
| Scotland 🔨 | 1 | 0 | 1 | 0 | 0 | 1 | 0 | X | 3 |
| Canada | 0 | 2 | 0 | 1 | 1 | 0 | 4 | X | 8 |

Player percentages
| Scotland | | Canada | |
|---|---|---|---|
| Gina Aitken | 75% | Joanne Courtney | 87% |
| Bruce Mouat | 86% | Reid Carruthers | 95% |
| Total | 82% | Total | 92% |

| Sheet E | 1 | 2 | 3 | 4 | 5 | 6 | 7 | 8 | Final |
| South Korea | 1 | 1 | 1 | 0 | 0 | 2 | 1 | X | 6 |
| Ireland 🔨 | 0 | 0 | 0 | 1 | 2 | 0 | 0 | X | 3 |

Player percentages
| South Korea | | Ireland | |
|---|---|---|---|
| Jang Hye-ji | 90% | Alison Fyfe | 50% |
| Lee Ki-jeong | 73% | Neil Fyfe | 63% |
| Total | 80% | Total | 58% |

Friday, April 28, 12:30

| Sheet A | 1 | 2 | 3 | 4 | 5 | 6 | 7 | 8 | Final |
| Switzerland 🔨 | 3 | 0 | 0 | 2 | 1 | 1 | 0 | 1 | 8 |
| Spain | 0 | 3 | 1 | 0 | 0 | 0 | 1 | 0 | 5 |

Player percentages
| Switzerland | | Spain | |
|---|---|---|---|
| Jenny Perret | 83% | Irantzu Garcia | 67% |
| Martin Rios | 91% | Gontzal Garcia | 80% |
| Total | 88% | Total | 75% |

| Sheet B | 1 | 2 | 3 | 4 | 5 | 6 | 7 | 8 | Final |
| Norway 🔨 | 1 | 0 | 3 | 0 | 1 | 0 | 2 | 2 | 9 |
| Italy | 0 | 1 | 0 | 2 | 0 | 2 | 0 | 0 | 5 |

Player percentages
| Norway | | Italy | |
|---|---|---|---|
| Kristin Skaslien | 100% | Veronica Zappone | 80% |
| Magnus Nedregotten | 83% | Simone Gonin | 80% |
| Total | 90% | Total | 80% |

| Sheet C | 1 | 2 | 3 | 4 | 5 | 6 | 7 | 8 | Final |
| Czech Republic 🔨 | 1 | 0 | 1 | 0 | 2 | 0 | 2 | 2 | 8 |
| Hungary | 0 | 1 | 0 | 3 | 0 | 2 | 0 | 0 | 6 |

Player percentages
| Czech Republic | | Hungary | |
|---|---|---|---|
| Zuzana Hájková | 72% | Dorottya Palancsa | 60% |
| Tomáš Paul | 77% | Zsolt Kiss | 50% |
| Total | 75% | Total | 54% |

| Sheet D | 1 | 2 | 3 | 4 | 5 | 6 | 7 | 8 | 9 | Final |
| United States 🔨 | 0 | 2 | 0 | 0 | 2 | 1 | 0 | 0 | 0 | 5 |
| Finland | 1 | 0 | 1 | 1 | 0 | 0 | 1 | 1 | 1 | 6 |

Player percentages
| United States | | Finland | |
|---|---|---|---|
| Becca Hamilton | 60% | Oona Kauste | 71% |
| Matt Hamilton | 83% | Tomi Rantamäki | 73% |
| Total | 74% | Total | 72% |

=== 9th–16th Quarterfinals ===
Friday, April 28, 16:00

| Sheet A | 1 | 2 | 3 | 4 | 5 | 6 | 7 | 8 | Final |
| Sweden 🔨 | 0 | 0 | 1 | 0 | 1 | 0 | 0 | X | 2 |
| Scotland | 1 | 1 | 0 | 4 | 0 | 1 | 2 | X | 9 |

Player percentages
| Sweden | | Scotland | |
|---|---|---|---|
| Camilla Noreen | 68% | Gina Aitken | 91% |
| Per Noreen | 59% | Bruce Mouat | 82% |
| Total | 63% | Total | 86% |

| Sheet C | 1 | 2 | 3 | 4 | 5 | 6 | 7 | 8 | Final |
| Russia 🔨 | 2 | 0 | 0 | 0 | 1 | 0 | 4 | X | 7 |
| Ireland | 0 | 1 | 1 | 1 | 0 | 2 | 0 | X | 5 |

Player percentages
| Russia | | Ireland | |
|---|---|---|---|
| Anastasia Bryzgalova | 74% | Alison Fyfe | 68% |
| Aleksandr Krushelnitckii | 69% | Neil Fyfe | 68% |
| Total | 72% | Total | 68% |

| Sheet D | 1 | 2 | 3 | 4 | 5 | 6 | 7 | 8 | Final |
| Italy 🔨 | 1 | 0 | 1 | 0 | 3 | 0 | 0 | 3 | 8 |
| Spain | 0 | 1 | 0 | 1 | 0 | 2 | 1 | 0 | 5 |

Player percentages
| Italy | | Spain | |
|---|---|---|---|
| Veronica Zappone | 72% | Irantzu Garcia | 77% |
| Simone Gonin | 83% | Gontzal Garcia | 68% |
| Total | 79% | Total | 73% |

| Sheet E | 1 | 2 | 3 | 4 | 5 | 6 | 7 | 8 | Final |
| United States 🔨 | 2 | 2 | 2 | 3 | 1 | 1 | X | X | 11 |
| Hungary | 0 | 0 | 0 | 0 | 0 | 0 | X | X | 0 |

Player percentages
| United States | | Hungary | |
|---|---|---|---|
| Becca Hamilton | 96% | Dorottya Palancsa | 50% |
| Matt Hamilton | 85% | Zsolt Kiss | 42% |
| Total | 89% | Total | 45% |

=== Quarterfinals ===
Friday, April 28, 19:30

| Sheet B | 1 | 2 | 3 | 4 | 5 | 6 | 7 | 8 | Final |
| Latvia 🔨 | 2 | 0 | 0 | 0 | 2 | 1 | 0 | X | 5 |
| Canada | 0 | 3 | 2 | 1 | 0 | 0 | 4 | X | 10 |

Player percentages
| Latvia | | Canada | |
|---|---|---|---|
| Santa Blumberga | 70% | Joanne Courtney | 73% |
| Andris Bremanis | 81% | Reid Carruthers | 86% |
| Total | 76% | Total | 81% |

| Sheet C | 1 | 2 | 3 | 4 | 5 | 6 | 7 | 8 | Final |
| South Korea 🔨 | 0 | 1 | 1 | 0 | 0 | 0 | 0 | X | 2 |
| China | 1 | 0 | 0 | 3 | 2 | 1 | 1 | X | 8 |

Player percentages
| South Korea | | China | |
|---|---|---|---|
| Jang Hye-ji | 77% | Rui Wang | 80% |
| Lee Ki-jeong | 80% | Ba Dexin | 93% |
| Total | 79% | Total | 88% |

| Sheet D | 1 | 2 | 3 | 4 | 5 | 6 | 7 | 8 | Final |
| Switzerland | 1 | 0 | 2 | 0 | 1 | 1 | 0 | 3 | 8 |
| Norway 🔨 | 0 | 1 | 0 | 2 | 0 | 0 | 1 | 0 | 4 |

Player percentages
| Switzerland | | Norway | |
|---|---|---|---|
| Jenny Perret | 97% | Kristin Skaslien | 72% |
| Martin Rios | 82% | Magnus Nedregotten | 81% |
| Total | 88% | Total | 78% |

| Sheet E | 1 | 2 | 3 | 4 | 5 | 6 | 7 | 8 | Final |
| Czech Republic 🔨 | 0 | 1 | 0 | 0 | 0 | 3 | 0 | 2 | 6 |
| Finland | 1 | 0 | 1 | 1 | 1 | 0 | 1 | 0 | 5 |

Player percentages
| Czech Republic | | Finland | |
|---|---|---|---|
| Zuzana Hájková | 73% | Oona Kauste | 63% |
| Tomáš Paul | 82% | Tomi Rantamäki | 69% |
| Total | 79% | Total | 66% |

=== 9th–12th Semifinals ===
Saturday, April 29, 8:30

| Sheet B | 1 | 2 | 3 | 4 | 5 | 6 | 7 | 8 | 9 | Final |
| Russia 🔨 | 1 | 0 | 1 | 1 | 0 | 1 | 1 | 0 | 1 | 6 |
| Scotland | 0 | 2 | 0 | 0 | 1 | 0 | 0 | 2 | 0 | 5 |

Player percentages
| Russia | | Scotland | |
|---|---|---|---|
| Anastasia Bryzgalova | 88% | Gina Aitken | 67% |
| Aleksandr Krushelnitckii | 80% | Bruce Mouat | 76% |
| Total | 85% | Total | 72% |

| Sheet C | 1 | 2 | 3 | 4 | 5 | 6 | 7 | 8 | Final |
| Italy 🔨 | 1 | 0 | 0 | 0 | 0 | 2 | 0 | 1 | 4 |
| United States | 0 | 1 | 1 | 1 | 1 | 0 | 3 | 0 | 7 |

Player percentages
| Italy | | United States | |
|---|---|---|---|
| Veronica Zappone | 77% | Becca Hamilton | 91% |
| Simone Gonin | 68% | Matt Hamilton | 91% |
| Total | 72% | Total | 91% |

=== 11 v 12 ===
Saturday, April 29, 12:00

| Sheet E | 1 | 2 | 3 | 4 | 5 | 6 | 7 | 8 | Final |
| Scotland 🔨 | 2 | 0 | 2 | 0 | 2 | 0 | 1 | 0 | 7 |
| Italy | 0 | 1 | 0 | 2 | 0 | 1 | 0 | 1 | 5 |

Player percentages
| Scotland | | Italy | |
|---|---|---|---|
| Gina Aitken | 88% | Veronica Zappone | 88% |
| Bruce Mouat | 83% | Simone Gonin | 73% |
| Total | 85% | Total | 79% |

=== 5th–8th Semifinals ===
Saturday, April 29, 12:00

| Sheet A | 1 | 2 | 3 | 4 | 5 | 6 | 7 | 8 | Final |
| South Korea 🔨 | 1 | 1 | 1 | 2 | 0 | 3 | X | X | 8 |
| Latvia | 0 | 0 | 0 | 0 | 2 | 0 | X | X | 2 |

Player percentages
| South Korea | | Latvia | |
|---|---|---|---|
| Jang Hye-ji | 93% | Santa Blumberga | 60% |
| Lee Ki-jeong | 75% | Andris Bremanis | 78% |
| Total | 82% | Total | 71% |

| Sheet C | 1 | 2 | 3 | 4 | 5 | 6 | 7 | 8 | Final |
| Finland | 0 | 1 | 0 | 0 | 1 | 0 | 2 | X | 4 |
| Norway 🔨 | 1 | 0 | 2 | 2 | 0 | 1 | 0 | X | 6 |

Player percentages
| Finland | | Norway | |
|---|---|---|---|
| Oona Kauste | 60% | Kristin Skaslien | 60% |
| Tomi Rantamäki | 64% | Magnus Nedregotten | 75% |
| Total | 62% | Total | 69% |

=== Semifinals ===
Saturday, April 29, 12:00

| Sheet B | 1 | 2 | 3 | 4 | 5 | 6 | 7 | 8 | Final |
| Czech Republic 🔨 | 1 | 0 | 2 | 1 | 0 | 0 | 2 | 0 | 6 |
| Switzerland | 0 | 3 | 0 | 0 | 1 | 2 | 0 | 1 | 7 |

Player percentages
| Czech Republic | | Switzerland | |
|---|---|---|---|
| Zuzana Hájková | 81% | Jenny Perret | 58% |
| Tomáš Paul | 78% | Martin Rios | 83% |
| Total | 79% | Total | 73% |

| Sheet D | 1 | 2 | 3 | 4 | 5 | 6 | 7 | 8 | 9 | Final |
| China | 0 | 0 | 1 | 0 | 1 | 0 | 1 | 1 | 0 | 4 |
| Canada 🔨 | 1 | 1 | 0 | 1 | 0 | 1 | 0 | 0 | 1 | 5 |

Player percentages
| China | | Canada | |
|---|---|---|---|
| Rui Wang | 64% | Joanne Courtney | 74% |
| Ba Dexin | 94% | Reid Carruthers | 92% |
| Total | 82% | Total | 85% |

=== 9 v 10 ===
Saturday, April 29, 16:00

| Sheet A | 1 | 2 | 3 | 4 | 5 | 6 | 7 | 8 | Final |
| United States 🔨 | 0 | 0 | 2 | 0 | 1 | 1 | 0 | 1 | 5 |
| Russia | 1 | 1 | 0 | 4 | 0 | 0 | 1 | 0 | 7 |

Player percentages
| United States | | Russia | |
|---|---|---|---|
| Becca Hamilton | 82% | Anastasia Bryzgalova | 85% |
| Matt Hamilton | 86% | Aleksandr Krushelnitckii | 81% |
| Total | 85% | Total | 83% |

=== 7 v 8 ===
Saturday, April 29, 16:00

| Sheet D | 1 | 2 | 3 | 4 | 5 | 6 | 7 | 8 | Final |
| Latvia 🔨 | 0 | 0 | 0 | 1 | 0 | 0 | X | X | 1 |
| Finland | 1 | 1 | 2 | 0 | 2 | 1 | X | X | 7 |

Player percentages
| Latvia | | Finland | |
|---|---|---|---|
| Santa Blumberga | 52% | Oona Kauste | 71% |
| Andris Bremanis | 53% | Tomi Rantamäki | 63% |
| Total | 53% | Total | 66% |

=== 5 v 6 ===
Saturday, April 29, 16:00

| Sheet B | 1 | 2 | 3 | 4 | 5 | 6 | 7 | 8 | Final |
| South Korea 🔨 | 0 | 0 | 0 | 1 | 1 | 0 | 0 | X | 2 |
| Norway | 1 | 1 | 1 | 0 | 0 | 3 | 3 | X | 9 |

Player percentages
| South Korea | | Norway | |
|---|---|---|---|
| Jang Hye-ji | 57% | Kristin Skaslien | 77% |
| Lee Ki-jeong | 76% | Magnus Nedregotten | 83% |
| Total | 69% | Total | 81% |

=== Bronze medal game ===
Saturday, April 29, 16:00

| Sheet E | 1 | 2 | 3 | 4 | 5 | 6 | 7 | 8 | Final |
| China 🔨 | 1 | 0 | 1 | 1 | 0 | 2 | 1 | X | 6 |
| Czech Republic | 0 | 1 | 0 | 0 | 1 | 0 | 0 | X | 2 |

Player percentages
| China | | Czech Republic | |
|---|---|---|---|
| Rui Wang | 88% | Zuzana Hájková | 66% |
| Ba Dexin | 90% | Tomáš Paul | 76% |
| Total | 89% | Total | 72% |

=== Gold medal game ===
Saturday, April 29, 16:00

| Sheet C | 1 | 2 | 3 | 4 | 5 | 6 | 7 | 8 | Final |
| Switzerland 🔨 | 0 | 1 | 0 | 0 | 0 | 1 | 0 | 4 | 6 |
| Canada | 1 | 0 | 1 | 1 | 1 | 0 | 1 | 0 | 5 |

Player percentages
| Switzerland | | Canada | |
|---|---|---|---|
| Jenny Perret | 61% | Joanne Courtney | 72% |
| Martin Rios | 64% | Reid Carruthers | 83% |
| Total | 63% | Total | 79% |

=== Top 5 Player percentages ===
Round robin only

| Males | % |
|---|---|
| (Scotland) Bruce Mouat | 82 |
| (Canada) Reid Carruthers | 82 |
| (Switzerland) Martin Rios | 82 |
| (South Korea) Lee Ki-jeong | 81 |
| (Czech Republic) Tomáš Paul | 81 |

| Females | % |
|---|---|
| (Russia) Anastasia Bryzgalova | 81 |
| (Scotland) Gina Aitken | 78 |
| (Switzerland) Jenny Perret | 77 |
| (China) Rui Wang | 76 |
| (Canada) Joanne Courtney | 76 |
