= Curling World Cup =

2018–19 curling tournament

- Established: 2018
- Abolished: 2019
- 2018–19 host city: Suzhou, China (First Leg); Omaha, United States (Second Leg); Jönköping, Sweden (Third Leg); Beijing, China (Grand Final)

The Curling World Cup was a curling tournament that was held as part of the 2018–19 curling season, organized by the World Curling Federation and Kingdomway Sports. The tournament had four legs: three qualifying legs and a Grand Final.

== History ==
In September 2017, the World Curling Federation announced they had reached an agreement with Kingdomway Sports to create a World Series of Curling, to help develop the sport in the lead-up to the 2022 Winter Olympics in Beijing. The tournament would consist of four legs, the first being in the Pacific-Asia Zone, the second in the European Zone, the third in the Americas Zone, and a Grand Final in Beijing. In January 2018, the World Curling Federation announced the name of the tournament would be changed to the Curling World Cup, and consist of men's, women's, and mixed doubles events.

On July 19, 2018, details about the Curling World Cup were announced, including the host cities, format, qualification rules, and logos for each leg of the event.

On June 17, 2019, it was announced by the World Curling Federation that the series would not be renewed because Kingdomway Sports breached their agreement with the WCF by refusing to make all their payments as outlined in their contract.

== Format ==
Curling World Cup matches had eight ends, rather than the standard ten ends. Ties after eight ends were decided by a shoot-out, with each team throwing a stone and the one closest to the button winning. A win in eight or fewer ends earned a team 3 points, a shoot-out win 2 points, a shoot-out loss 1 point, and 0 points for a loss in eight or fewer ends.

== Champions ==
Year	Event	First leg	Second leg	Third leg	Grand Final
2018–19	Women	Canada (Homan)	Japan (Fujisawa)	South Korea (Kim)	Canada (Jones)
2018–19	Men	Canada (Koe)	United States (Shuster)	Canada (Dunstone)	Canada (Koe)
2018–19	Mixed doubles	Canada (Walker/Muyres)	Norway (Skaslien/Nedregotten)	Canada (Sahaidak/Lott)	Norway (Skaslien/Nedregotten)
