= 2012 World Mixed Doubles Curling Championship =

- Host city: Erzurum, Turkey
- Arena: Milli Piyango Curling Arena
- Dates: April 23–29, 2012
- Winner: Switzerland
- Female: Nadine Lehmann
- Male: Martin Rios
- Coach: Allan Moore
- Finalist: Sweden

The 2012 World Mixed Doubles Curling Championship was held at the Milli Piyango Curling Arena in Erzurum, Turkey from April 23 to 29. Erzurum previously hosted the 2011 Winter Universiade, during which the Milli Piyango Curling Arena was used for the curling competition. Among the previous hosts of the World Mixed Doubles Curling Championships, Turkey is the nation with the least experience in curling; its curling federation joined the World Curling Federation in 2009. For the first time since 2009, the event was not held in conjunction with the same year's World Senior Championships.

Switzerland won its fourth title in five years, defeating Sweden in the final with a score of 7–6. Austria won its first medal at the World Mixed Doubles Championship with a 12–7 win in the bronze medal game over the United States, which had its best finish at the event.

== Teams ==
The teams are listed as follows:

=== Blue Group ===
Czech Republic	England	Estonia
Second: Lukas Klima; Lead: Petra Vinšová	Second: John Sharp; Lead: Lorna Rettig	Second: Martin Lill; Lead: Kristiine Lill
Germany	Ireland	Japan
Second: Manuel Walter; Lead: Ann Kathrin Bastian	Second: David Smith; Lead: Yvonne Chalmers	Second: Kenji Tomabechi; Lead: Michiko Tomabechi
New Zealand	Switzerland	United States
Second: John Campbell; Lead: Natalie Campbell	Second: Martin Rios; Lead: Nadine Lehmann	Second: Brady Clark; Lead: Cristin Clark

=== Red Group ===
Austria	Canada	China
Second: Christian Roth; Lead: Claudia Toth	Second: Dean Hicke; Lead: Chantelle Eberle	Second: Ji Yansong; Lead: Liu Sijia
Finland	France	Latvia
Second: Jussi Uusipaavalniemi; Lead: Jaana Hämäläinen	Second: Tony Angiboust; Lead: Delphine Charlet	Second: Ansis Regža; Lead: Dace Regža
Norway	Slovakia	Turkey
Second: Ole Hauge; Lead: Hillde Stenseth	Second: Pavol Pitoňák; Lead: Silvia Sykorová	Second: İlhan Osmanağaoğlu; Lead: Elif Kızılkaya

=== Yellow Group ===
Australia	Denmark	Spain
Second: Stephen Johns; Lead: Kim Forge	Second: Oliver Dupont; Lead: Mette de Neergard	Second: Sergio Vez Labrador; Lead: Irantzu Garcia Vez
Hungary	Italy	South Korea
Second: György Nagy; Lead: Ildikó Szekeres	Second: Simone Gonin; Lead: Lucrezia Salvai	Second: Beak Jong-chul; Lead: Park Kyung-mi
Romania	Scotland	Sweden
Second: Allen Coliban; Lead: Daiana Colceriu	Second: Lee McCleary; Lead: Judith McFarlane	Second: Per Noréen; Lead: Camilla Johansson

== Round-robin standings ==
Final round-robin standings

Key
Teams to Playoffs
Teams to Draw Shot Challenge (team with best moves to playoffs, other two play in qualification game)
Teams to Tiebreaker (winner moves on to Draw Shot Challenge)

Blue Group	W	L
Switzerland	8	0
United States	6	2
Estonia	5	3
Czech Republic	4	4
Japan	4	4
New Zealand	4	4
Germany	3	5
England	2	6
Ireland	0	8

Red Group	W	L
Canada	8	0
China	7	1
Austria	5	3
Finland	4	4
Latvia	4	4
Slovakia	3	5
France	2	6
Turkey	2	6
Norway	1	7

Yellow Group	W	L
Scotland	6	2
Sweden	6	2
Italy	5	3
Denmark	5	3
Hungary	4	4
Australia	3	5
Spain	3	5
South Korea	3	5
Romania	1	7

== Round-robin results ==
All times listed in Eastern European Summer Time (UTC+3).

=== Blue Group ===
==== Tuesday, April 24 ====
Draw 2 8:00

Sheet A	1	2	3	4	5	6	7	8	Final
Switzerland	1	1	1	2	1	0	0	1	7
New Zealand	0	0	0	0	0	1	4	0	5

Sheet B	1	2	3	4	5	6	7	8	9	Final
Germany	0	3	0	2	0	0	1	1	0	7
Estonia	1	0	3	0	2	1	0	0	1	8

Sheet C	1	2	3	4	5	6	7	8	Final
Czech Republic	2	0	4	0	2	0	2	X	10
England	0	2	0	2	0	1	0	X	5

Sheet D	1	2	3	4	5	6	7	8	Final
Japan	0	1	2	2	1	1	1	X	8
Ireland	3	0	0	0	0	0	0	X	3

Draw 4 14:30

Sheet B	1	2	3	4	5	6	7	8	Final
United States	0	0	0	1	0	3	1	1	6
New Zealand	1	1	1	0	1	0	0	0	4

Sheet D	1	2	3	4	5	6	7	8	Final
England	0	3	1	1	0	0	1	0	6
Germany	2	0	0	0	3	3	0	1	9

Sheet E	1	2	3	4	5	6	7	8	Final
Japan	0	0	0	0	1	0	X	X	1
Switzerland	1	2	2	3	0	1	X	X	9

Draw 5 17:45

Sheet A	1	2	3	4	5	6	7	8	Final
Estonia	1	3	4	0	3	2	X	X	13
Ireland	0	0	0	1	0	0	X	X	1

==== Wednesday, April 25 ====
Draw 7 8:00

Sheet A	1	2	3	4	5	6	7	8	Final
Germany	0	0	1	0	0	1	2	X	4
New Zealand	2	1	0	3	1	0	0	X	7

Sheet B	1	2	3	4	5	6	7	8	Final
England	0	0	1	0	1	2	3	1	8
Ireland	1	1	0	2	0	0	0	0	4

Sheet C	1	2	3	4	5	6	7	8	Final
Czech Republic	0	2	1	0	2	1	0	0	6
Switzerland	2	0	0	3	0	0	3	1	9

Draw 9 14:30

Sheet B	1	2	3	4	5	6	7	8	Final
Czech Republic	0	2	0	0	0	0	X	X	2
Japan	2	0	2	2	1	4	X	X	11

Sheet C	1	2	3	4	5	6	7	8	Final
United States	2	0	1	0	2	2	0	X	7
Germany	0	2	0	1	0	0	1	X	4

Sheet E	1	2	3	4	5	6	7	8	Final
New Zealand	0	3	0	1	0	0	X	X	4
England	2	0	4	0	4	1	X	X	11

Draw 10 17:45

Sheet D	1	2	3	4	5	6	7	8	Final
Estonia	0	2	0	0	2	1	0	X	5
Switzerland	3	0	1	2	0	0	3	X	9

Draw 11 21:00

Sheet D	1	2	3	4	5	6	7	8	Final
United States	1	0	4	1	0	0	2	1	9
Japan	0	1	0	0	2	2	0	0	5

==== Thursday, April 26 ====
Draw 12 8:00

Sheet E	1	2	3	4	5	6	7	8	Final
Germany	1	0	0	4	0	0	2	0	7
Czech Republic	0	1	2	0	2	1	0	2	8

Draw 13 11:15

Sheet A	1	2	3	4	5	6	7	8	Final
England	0	3	0	0	0	1	0	X	4
United States	2	0	2	1	2	0	2	X	9

Sheet D	1	2	3	4	5	6	7	8	Final
Japan	1	0	3	0	4	2	2	X	12
Estonia	0	2	0	3	0	0	0	X	5

Draw 14 14:30

Sheet B	1	2	3	4	5	6	7	8	Final
Ireland	0	0	0	0	0	1	X	X	1
Switzerland	2	2	1	1	4	0	X	X	10

Sheet D	1	2	3	4	5	6	7	8	Final
New Zealand	0	0	2	0	3	3	0	2	10
Czech Republic	1	1	0	2	0	0	3	0	7

Draw 15 17:45

Sheet B	1	2	3	4	5	6	7	8	Final
Estonia	0	0	0	1	1	2	1	X	5
United States	2	5	1	0	0	0	0	X	8

Draw 16 21:00

Sheet A	1	2	3	4	5	6	7	8	Final
Ireland	0	0	1	0	0	2	1	X	4
Germany	1	1	0	6	1	0	0	X	9

Sheet D	1	2	3	4	5	6	7	8	Final
Switzerland	1	1	0	1	1	0	2	X	6
England	0	0	2	0	0	1	0	X	3

==== Friday, April 27 ====
Draw 17 8:00

Sheet D	1	2	3	4	5	6	7	8	Final
Czech Republic	0	0	3	1	0	0	1	X	5
Estonia	3	2	0	0	1	1	0	X	7

Draw 18 11:15

Sheet B	1	2	3	4	5	6	7	8	Final
Switzerland	0	2	0	2	0	3	0	0	7
United States	1	0	1	0	1	0	2	1	6

Draw 19 14:30

Sheet A	1	2	3	4	5	6	7	8	Final
New Zealand	1	1	0	1	1	0	3	1	8
Japan	0	0	1	0	0	5	0	0	6

Sheet C	1	2	3	4	5	6	7	8	Final
Ireland	0	0	1	1	0	0	1	X	3
Czech Republic	1	2	0	0	1	2	0	X	6

Draw 20 17:45

Sheet E	1	2	3	4	5	6	7	8	Final
Switzerland	3	0	1	0	0	2	2	X	8
Germany	0	2	0	2	2	0	0	X	6

Draw 21 21:00

Sheet B	1	2	3	4	5	6	7	8	Final
Japan	1	1	0	0	0	1	2	1	6
England	0	0	1	3	1	0	0	0	5

Sheet C	1	2	3	4	5	6	7	8	Final
Estonia	1	0	2	1	0	0	6	X	10
New Zealand	0	1	0	0	2	1	0	X	4

Sheet E	1	2	3	4	5	6	7	8	Final
Ireland	0	0	1	1	1	0	0	X	3
United States	3	1	0	0	0	3	1	X	8

==== Saturday, April 28 ====
Draw 23 11:15

Sheet A	1	2	3	4	5	6	7	8	Final
United States	0	0	1	0	3	0	0	X	4
Czech Republic	1	1	0	2	0	2	1	X	7

Sheet B	1	2	3	4	5	6	7	8	Final
New Zealand	3	1	2	1	0	2	X	X	9
Ireland	0	0	0	0	1	0	X	X	1

Sheet D	1	2	3	4	5	6	7	8	Final
Germany	3	0	2	1	0	1	0	1	8
Japan	0	2	0	0	4	0	1	0	7

Sheet E	1	2	3	4	5	6	7	8	Final
England	0	1	0	1	0	2	X	X	4
Estonia	3	0	4	0	2	0	X	X	9

=== Red Group ===
==== Monday, April 23 ====
Draw 1 18:45

Sheet A	1	2	3	4	5	6	7	8	Final
China	0	5	0	2	1	0	0	X	8
Austria	1	0	1	0	0	1	1	X	4

Sheet B	1	2	3	4	5	6	7	8	9	Final
Turkey	0	2	0	0	1	1	0	2	1	7
Slovakia	1	0	3	1	0	0	1	0	0	6

Sheet D	1	2	3	4	5	6	7	8	Final
France	0	1	0	0	2	0	0	X	3
Latvia	2	0	2	4	0	1	2	X	11

Sheet E	1	2	3	4	5	6	7	8	Final
Finland	0	0	0	0	3	0	2	X	5
Canada	2	2	2	1	0	2	0	X	9

==== Tuesday, April 24 ====
Draw 3 11:15

Sheet A	1	2	3	4	5	6	7	8	Final
Austria	1	0	0	1	0	0	0	X	2
Canada	0	1	1	0	1	4	1	X	8

Sheet B	1	2	3	4	5	6	7	8	9	Final
Finland	2	0	0	2	2	1	0	2	0	9
France	0	5	2	0	0	0	2	0	1	10

Sheet C	1	2	3	4	5	6	7	8	Final
Latvia	0	3	0	1	3	0	0	0	7
Slovakia	2	0	0	0	0	3	2	3	10

Sheet D	1	2	3	4	5	6	7	8	Final
Norway	1	0	2	2	0	2	1	X	8
Turkey	0	1	0	0	2	0	0	X	3

Draw 5 17:45

Sheet D	1	2	3	4	5	6	7	8	Final
Canada	1	0	3	0	2	0	1	X	7
France	0	1	0	1	0	1	0	X	3

Sheet E	1	2	3	4	5	6	7	8	Final
Latvia	1	0	0	3	0	1	2	0	7
Norway	0	1	3	0	1	0	0	1	6

Draw 6 21:00

Sheet A	1	2	3	4	5	6	7	8	Final
Finland	0	2	0	0	4	2	2	X	10
Slovakia	1	0	2	2	0	0	0	X	5

Sheet C	1	2	3	4	5	6	7	8	Final
China	2	2	1	3	0	1	0	X	9
Turkey	0	0	0	0	1	0	1	X	2

==== Wednesday, April 25 ====
Draw 8 11:15

Sheet A	1	2	3	4	5	6	7	8	Final
France	0	0	0	2	0	1	2	0	5
Turkey	2	1	1	0	2	0	0	1	7

Sheet C	1	2	3	4	5	6	7	8	Final
Austria	0	5	0	4	1	1	X	X	11
Norway	2	0	2	0	0	0	X	X	4

Sheet D	1	2	3	4	5	6	7	8	Final
Slovakia	1	1	0	0	0	0	1	X	3
Canada	0	0	3	3	2	1	0	X	9

Draw 10 17:45

Sheet A	1	2	3	4	5	6	7	8	Final
Norway	2	0	2	0	1	2	0	X	7
Finland	0	2	0	4	0	0	3	X	9

Sheet B	1	2	3	4	5	6	7	8	Final
Austria	3	0	1	0	1	0	5	X	10
Latvia	0	1	0	2	0	1	0	X	4

Sheet C	1	2	3	4	5	6	7	8	Final
France	0	0	0	0	2	0	1	X	3
China	2	1	2	1	0	3	0	X	9

Sheet E	1	2	3	4	5	6	7	8	Final
Canada	3	0	1	3	0	1	0	X	8
Turkey	0	1	0	0	1	0	1	X	3

==== Thursday, April 26 ====
Draw 12 8:00

Sheet B	1	2	3	4	5	6	7	8	9	Final
Slovakia	1	0	2	0	0	4	0	1	2	10
Norway	0	2	0	3	1	0	2	0	0	8

Sheet D	1	2	3	4	5	6	7	8	Final
Latvia	0	0	0	2	0	2	0	X	4
China	2	1	1	0	3	0	1	X	8

Draw 13 11:15

Sheet E	1	2	3	4	5	6	7	8	Final
France	0	0	0	0	0	0	X	X	0
Austria	2	2	2	3	1	0	X	X	10

Draw 14 14:30

Sheet A	1	2	3	4	5	6	7	8	Final
Canada	0	2	1	0	3	0	2	X	8
China	1	0	0	2	0	2	0	X	5

Sheet C	1	2	3	4	5	6	7	8	Final
Finland	0	3	0	0	0	0	X	X	3
Latvia	3	0	4	1	1	2	X	X	11

Draw 15 17:45

Sheet D	1	2	3	4	5	6	7	8	Final
Turkey	0	0	0	0	0	0	0	X	0
Austria	1	2	2	0	2	2	1	X	10

Draw 16 21:00

Sheet B	1	2	3	4	5	6	7	8	Final
China	1	2	1	1	0	2	4	X	11
Finland	0	0	0	0	1	0	0	X	1

Sheet C	1	2	3	4	5	6	7	8	Final
Norway	0	0	0	0	0	0	X	X	0
France	3	2	3	2	3	1	X	X	14

==== Friday, April 27 ====
Draw 18 11:15

Sheet C	1	2	3	4	5	6	7	8	Final
Canada	0	3	2	0	2	2	X	X	9
Norway	1	0	0	1	0	0	X	X	2

Sheet D	1	2	3	4	5	6	7	8	Final
Austria	0	3	0	2	1	0	0	0	6
Finland	2	0	1	0	0	4	1	1	9

Sheet E	1	2	3	4	5	6	7	8	Final
Slovakia	2	2	0	0	1	3	0	1	9
France	0	0	3	1	0	0	4	0	8

Draw 20 17:45

Sheet A	1	2	3	4	5	6	7	8	Final
Turkey	1	0	2	0	0	0	1	X	4
Latvia	0	2	0	3	1	1	0	X	7

Sheet B	1	2	3	4	5	6	7	8	Final
Norway	0	1	0	1	0	0	0	X	2
China	3	0	2	0	1	1	3	X	10

Sheet C	1	2	3	4	5	6	7	8	Final
Slovakia	0	1	0	0	0	1	0	X	2
Austria	2	0	2	1	1	0	3	X	9

==== Saturday, April 28 ====
Draw 22 8:00

Sheet B	1	2	3	4	5	6	7	8	Final
Latvia	0	0	1	0	2	0	2	X	5
Canada	3	1	0	2	0	2	0	X	8

Sheet C	1	2	3	4	5	6	7	8	Final
Turkey	0	1	0	2	0	2	0	1	6
Finland	2	0	4	0	1	0	2	0	9

Sheet E	1	2	3	4	5	6	7	8	Final
China	0	2	2	0	1	1	0	X	6
Slovakia	1	0	0	1	0	0	2	X	4

=== Yellow Group ===
==== Monday, April 23 ====
Draw 1 18:45

Sheet C	1	2	3	4	5	6	7	8	Final
Spain	2	0	0	0	1	0	0	X	3
Italy	0	1	2	2	0	2	2	X	9

==== Tuesday, April 24 ====
Draw 2 8:00

Sheet E	1	2	3	4	5	6	7	8	Final
Romania	1	0	0	1	2	0	0	0	4
Scotland	0	2	1	0	0	1	1	2	7

Draw 3 11:15

Sheet E	1	2	3	4	5	6	7	8	Final
Sweden	0	0	2	0	2	3	0	1	8
Spain	1	1	0	2	0	0	1	0	5

Draw 4 14:30

Sheet A	1	2	3	4	5	6	7	8	Final
Denmark	1	0	2	1	2	0	2	X	8
Hungary	0	1	0	0	0	3	0	X	4

Sheet C	1	2	3	4	5	6	7	8	Final
Italy	0	2	0	0	3	0	1	0	6
South Korea	1	0	4	4	0	1	0	2	12

Draw 5 17:45

Sheet B	1	2	3	4	5	6	7	8	9	Final
Scotland	0	2	2	0	2	1	0	0	1	8
Sweden	1	0	0	1	0	0	4	1	0	7

Sheet C	1	2	3	4	5	6	7	8	Final
Australia	1	0	0	2	0	0	1	0	4
Spain	0	1	2	0	3	1	0	1	8

Draw 6 21:00

Sheet D	1	2	3	4	5	6	7	8	Final
Italy	2	2	0	3	0	3	0	X	10
Romania	0	0	3	0	1	0	1	X	5

Sheet E	1	2	3	4	5	6	7	8	Final
Hungary	3	1	1	1	0	1	0	X	7
South Korea	0	0	0	0	1	0	1	X	2

==== Wednesday, April 25 ====
Draw 7 8:00

Sheet D	1	2	3	4	5	6	7	8	Final
Denmark	5	0	2	0	4	0	X	X	11
Sweden	0	2	0	1	0	2	X	X	5

Draw 8 11:15

Sheet B	1	2	3	4	5	6	7	8	Final
Hungary	1	3	1	4	1	0	X	X	10
Spain	0	0	0	0	0	4	X	X	4

Draw 9 14:30

Sheet A	1	2	3	4	5	6	7	8	Final
Australia	1	0	1	0	0	0	0	X	2
South Korea	0	3	0	4	2	2	1	X	12

Sheet D	1	2	3	4	5	6	7	8	Final
Scotland	0	0	3	2	0	1	0	3	9
Italy	1	2	0	0	2	0	1	0	6

Draw 11 21:00

Sheet A	1	2	3	4	5	6	7	8	Final
Hungary	2	1	0	1	0	1	1	0	6
Romania	0	0	1	0	1	0	0	1	3

Sheet B	1	2	3	4	5	6	7	8	Final
South Korea	0	0	3	0	0	3	1	0	7
Spain	3	5	0	1	1	0	0	1	11

Sheet C	1	2	3	4	5	6	7	8	Final
Denmark	1	0	0	1	3	0	3	0	8
Scotland	0	3	1	0	0	2	0	1	7

Sheet E	1	2	3	4	5	6	7	8	9	Final
Australia	0	0	1	0	3	0	1	1	0	6
Italy	1	2	0	2	0	1	0	0	1	7

==== Thursday, April 26 ====
Draw 12 8:00

Sheet A	1	2	3	4	5	6	7	8	Final
Italy	0	3	0	0	0	0	3	0	6
Sweden	2	0	1	1	1	1	0	1	7

Draw 13 11:15

Sheet B	1	2	3	4	5	6	7	8	Final
Australia	0	2	0	1	1	0	0	1	5
Hungary	1	0	1	0	0	3	1	0	6

Sheet D	1	2	3	4	5	6	7	8	Final
South Korea	1	2	0	4	0	0	2	X	9
Denmark	0	0	1	0	2	2	0	X	5

Draw 14 14:30

Sheet E	1	2	3	4	5	6	7	8	Final
Romania	0	1	0	3	0	0	3	X	7
Sweden	4	0	5	0	5	1	0	X	15

Draw 15 17:45

Sheet A	1	2	3	4	5	6	7	8	9	Final
Spain	0	3	1	2	0	0	0	0	0	6
Denmark	1	0	0	0	2	1	1	1	1	7

Sheet C	1	2	3	4	5	6	7	8	Final
Hungary	0	0	1	2	1	0	0	1	5
Italy	1	2	0	0	0	1	2	0	6

Sheet E	1	2	3	4	5	6	7	8	Final
Scotland	1	0	2	0	0	0	1	X	4
Australia	0	3	0	3	2	2	0	X	10

Draw 16 21:00

Sheet E	1	2	3	4	5	6	7	8	Final
South Korea	1	0	0	2	0	2	0	0	5
Romania	0	1	1	0	3	0	1	1	7

==== Friday, April 27 ====
Draw 17 8:00

Sheet B	1	2	3	4	5	6	7	8	Final
Italy	0	2	0	3	0	2	0	1	8
Denmark	1	0	1	0	4	0	1	0	7

Sheet C	1	2	3	4	5	6	7	8	Final
Sweden	1	1	0	1	1	1	0	X	5
Hungary	0	0	1	0	0	0	1	X	2

Draw 18 11:15

Sheet A	1	2	3	4	5	6	7	8	Final
South Korea	1	0	0	0	0	0	0	X	1
Scotland	0	2	1	1	1	1	1	X	7

Draw 19 14:30

Sheet B	1	2	3	4	5	6	7	8	Final
Spain	1	0	2	1	0	0	1	1	6
Romania	0	4	0	0	1	0	0	0	5

Sheet E	1	2	3	4	5	6	7	8	Final
Denmark	2	1	0	2	0	3	0	0	8
Australia	0	0	2	0	3	0	2	2	9

Draw 20 17:45

Sheet D	1	2	3	4	5	6	7	8	Final
Scotland	0	1	0	3	0	0	0	3	7
Hungary	1	0	2	0	1	1	1	0	6

Draw 21 21:00

Sheet A	1	2	3	4	5	6	7	8	Final
Romania	2	0	1	0	0	0	1	X	4
Denmark	0	2	0	2	5	4	0	X	13

Sheet D	1	2	3	4	5	6	7	8	Final
Sweden	3	0	2	1	0	1	0	4	11
Australia	0	1	0	0	2	0	3	0	6

==== Saturday, April 28 ====
Draw 22 8:00

Sheet A	1	2	3	4	5	6	7	8	Final
Sweden	2	0	2	2	0	0	2	X	8
South Korea	0	1	0	0	1	1	0	X	3

Sheet D	1	2	3	4	5	6	7	8	Final
Spain	1	0	0	0	0	0	X	X	1
Scotland	0	2	1	2	2	1	X	X	8

Draw 23 11:15

Sheet C	1	2	3	4	5	6	7	8	Final
Romania	0	2	0	0	1	0	2	0	5
Australia	2	0	1	1	0	1	0	3	8

== Tiebreaker ==
Saturday, April 28, 18:30

Sheet D	1	2	3	4	5	6	7	8	Final
Denmark	0	4	0	0	1	0	0	4	9
Italy	1	0	2	2	0	2	1	0	8

== Playoffs ==
Qualification Game
B3	Estonia	8
Y3	Denmark	7

Quarterfinals
B1	Switzerland	10
B3	Estonia	2
B2	United States	8
R2	China	2
R1	Canada	1
Y2	Sweden	10
Y1	Scotland	4
R3	Austria	11

Semifinals
B1	Switzerland	9
B2	United States	7
Y2	Sweden	13
R3	Austria	3

Gold Medal Game
B1	Switzerland	7
Y2	Sweden	6

Bronze Medal Game
B2	United States	7
R3	Austria	12

=== Qualification Game ===
Saturday, April 28, 18:30

Sheet C	1	2	3	4	5	6	7	8	9	Final
Estonia	0	2	0	4	0	0	1	0	1	8
Denmark	1	0	3	0	1	1	0	1	0	7

=== Quarterfinals ===
Sunday, April 29, 8:00

Sheet B	1	2	3	4	5	6	7	8	Final
Switzerland	2	0	3	0	2	3	X	X	10
Estonia	0	1	0	1	0	0	X	X	2

Sheet A	1	2	3	4	5	6	7	8	Final
United States	0	3	1	2	1	0	1	X	8
China	1	0	0	0	0	1	0	X	2

Sheet D	1	2	3	4	5	6	7	8	Final
Canada	0	0	0	0	1	0	0	X	1
Sweden	2	1	1	1	0	3	2	X	10

Sheet E	1	2	3	4	5	6	7	8	Final
Scotland	0	0	2	0	0	2	0	X	4
Austria	2	1	0	3	1	0	4	X	11

=== Semifinals ===
Sunday, April 29, 12:00

Sheet D	1	2	3	4	5	6	7	8	Final
Switzerland	0	3	0	0	0	3	2	1	9
United States	1	0	3	1	2	0	0	0	7

Sheet B	1	2	3	4	5	6	7	8	Final
Sweden	5	0	3	1	1	0	3	X	13
Austria	0	1	0	0	0	2	0	X	3

=== Bronze medal game ===
Sunday, April 29, 16:00

Sheet A	1	2	3	4	5	6	7	8	Final
United States	0	4	0	1	0	2	0	X	7
Austria	2	0	2	0	4	0	4	X	12

=== Gold medal game ===
Sunday, April 29, 16:00

Sheet C	1	2	3	4	5	6	7	8	Final
Switzerland	0	1	0	1	0	3	2	0	7
Sweden	1	0	2	0	2	0	0	1	6

2012 World Mixed Doubles Curling Championship winner
(Switzerland)
Switzerland
4th title
