= Per Noréen =

Swedish male curler and coach (b. 1965)

- Curler ♂
- Born: 6 November 1965 (age 61); Gävle

Team
- Curling club: Sollefteå CK, Sollefteå, Örnsköldsviks CK, Örnsköldsvik; CK Granit-Gävle, Gävle

Curling career
- Member Association: Sweden
- World Mixed Doubles Championship: 6 (2012, 2014, 2015, 2016, 2017, 2018)
- Other appearances: European Mixed Championship: 2 (2006, 2010), Curling World Cup: 1 (2018-19/3), World Senior Championships: 3 (2019, 2022, 2024)
Medal record
Curling
World Mixed Doubles Championship
Silver medal – second place	2012 Erzurum
Silver medal – second place	2014 Dumfries
Silver medal – second place	2015 Sochi
World Senior Championships
Bronze medal – third place	2022 Geneva
Bronze medal – third place	2024 Östersund

Per Wilhelm Noréen (born 6 November 1965) is a Swedish curler and curling coach.

He is a three-time World Mixed Doubles Championship silver medallist.

In 2006 he was inducted into the Swedish Curling Hall of Fame.

== Teams ==
=== Men's ===
Season	Skip	Third	Second	Lead	Alternate	Coach	Events
2003–04	Per Noréen	Tomas Andersson	Ola Brodin	Mattias Lundgren			
2005–06	Per Noréen	Jorgen Granberg	Stefan Nystrom	Flemming Patz			
2008–09	Per Noréen(fourth)	Andreas Prytz (skip)	Rickard Hallström	Fredrik Hallström			
2009–10	Per Noréen(fourth)	Andreas Prytz (skip)	Rickard Hallström	Fredrik Hallström			
2010–11	Per Noréen(fourth)	Andreas Prytz (skip)	Rickard Hallström	Fredrik Hallström			
2018–19	Per Noréen(fourth)	Per Carlsén (skip)	Fredrik Hallström	Tommy Olin	Dan-Ola Eriksson	Niklas Berggren	WSCC 2019 (5th)

=== Mixed ===
Season	Skip	Third	Second	Lead	Events
1991–92	Per Noréen	Camilla Johansson	Mikael Andersson	Anna Wedin	SMxCC 1992 (gold)
1993–94	Per Noréen	Camilla Johansson	Tomas Andersson	Anna Wedin	SMxCC 1994 (gold)
1998–99	Monika Hedgren-Ohlsson	Mats Ohlsson	Camilla Johansson	Per Noréen	SMxCC 1999 (gold)
2005–06	Per Noréen	Camilla Johansson	Flemming Patz	Susanne Patz	SMxCC 2006 (gold)
2006–07	Per Noréen	Camilla Johansson	Flemming Patz	Susanne Patz	EMxCC 2006 (4th)
2010–11	Per Noréen	Camilla Johansson	Patrik Karlsson	Katarina Nyberg	EMxCC 2010 (12th)
2010–11	Per Noréen	Camilla Johansson	Patrik Karlsson	Isabell Andersson	SMxCC 2011 (gold)
2013–14	Per Noréen	Camilla Johansson	Mikael Andersson	Isabell Andersson	SMxCC 2014 (silver)

=== Mixed doubles ===
Season	Male	Female	Coach	Events
2011–12	Per Noréen	Camilla Johansson		SMDCC 2012 (gold); WMDCC 2012 (silver)
2013–14	Per Noréen	Camilla Johansson		SMDCC 2014 (gold); WMDCC 2014 (silver)
2014–15	Per Noréen	Camilla Johansson		SMDCC 2015 (gold); WMDCC 2015 (silver)
2015–16	Per Noréen	Camilla Noréen		SMDCC 2016 (9th); WMDCC 2016 (25th)
2016–17	Per Noréen	Camilla Noréen		SMDCC 2017 (4th); WMDCC 2017 (13th)
2017–18	Per Noréen	Camilla Noréen	Alison Kreviazuk	SMDCC 2018 (silver); WMDCC 2018 (7th)
2018–19	Per Noréen	Camilla Noréen	Alison Kreviazuk	CWC 2018–19/3 (5th); SMDCC 2019 (14th)

== Record as a coach of national teams ==
Year	Tournament, event	National team	Place
2006	2006 European Curling Championships	Sweden (women)	6
2013	2013 World Mixed Doubles Curling Championship	Sweden (mixed doubles)	2nd place, silver medalist(s)

== Personal life ==
His wife and teammate is a curler Camilla Noréen (née Johansson).
