= Camilla Noréen =

Swedish curler

- Curler ♀
- Other names: Camilla Johansson
- Born: 16 March 1971 (age 55); Gävle, Sweden

Team
- Curling club: CK Granit-Gävle, Gävle, IK Fyris Uppsala, Uppsala
- Mixed doubles partner: Per Noréen

Curling career
- Member Association: Sweden
- World Mixed Doubles Championship: 6 (2012, 2014, 2015, 2016, 2017, 2018)
- European Championship: 1 (2006)
- Other appearances: European Mixed Championship: 2 (2006, 2010), Curling World Cup: 1 (2018-19/3)
Medal record
Curling
World Mixed Doubles Championship
Silver medal – second place	2012 Erzurum
Silver medal – second place	2014 Dumfries
Silver medal – second place	2015 Sochi
Swedish Women's Championship
Gold medal – first place	2006
Bronze medal – third place	2015

Camilla Noréen (born 16 March 1971 as Camilla Johansson) is a Swedish curler.

She is a three-time World Mixed Doubles Championship silver medallist alongside her husband Per.

In 2006 she was inducted into the Swedish Curling Hall of Fame.

== Teams ==
=== Women's ===
Season	Skip	Third	Second	Lead	Alternate	Coach	Events
2005–06	Camilla Johansson	Katarina Nyberg	Mio Hasselborg	Elisabeth Persson			SWCC 2006 (gold)
2006–07	Camilla Johansson	Katarina Nyberg	Mio Hasselborg	Elisabeth Persson	Linda Ohlsson	Per Noréen	ECC 2006 (6th)
2011–12	Hedvig Kamp	Camilla Johansson	Sigrid Kamp	Isabell Andersson	Johanna Heldin		
2014–15	Maria Prytz (fourth)	Christina Bertrup	Maria Wennerström	Margaretha Sigfridsson (skip)	Camilla Johansson	Fredrik Hallström	SWCC 2015 (bronze)

=== Mixed ===
Season	Skip	Third	Second	Lead	Events
2006–07	Per Noréen	Camilla Johansson	Flemming Patz	Susanne Patz	EMxCC 2006 (4th)
2010–11	Per Noréen	Camilla Johansson	Patrik Karlsson	Katarina Nyberg	EMxCC 2010 (12th)
2013–14	Per Noréen	Camilla Johansson	Mikael Andersson	Isabell Andersson	SMxCC 2014 (silver)

=== Mixed doubles ===
Season	Skip	Third	Coach	Events
2011–12	Per Noréen	Camilla Johansson		SMDCC 2012 (gold); WMDCC 2012 (silver)
2013–14	Per Noréen	Camilla Johansson		SMDCC 2014 (gold); WMDCC 2014 (silver)
2014–15	Per Noréen	Camilla Johansson		SMDCC 2015 (gold); WMDCC 2015 (silver)
2015–16	Per Noréen	Camilla Noréen		SMDCC 2016 (9th); WMDCC 2016 (25th)
2016–17	Per Noréen	Camilla Noréen		SMDCC 2017 (4th); WMDCC 2017 (13th)
2017–18	Per Noréen	Camilla Noréen	Alison Kreviazuk	SMDCC 2018 (silver); WMDCC 2018 (7th)
2018–19	Per Noréen	Camilla Noréen	Alison Kreviazuk	CWC 2018–19/3 (5th); SMDCC 2019 (14th)
