= Jenny Perret =

Swiss curler (born 1991)

- Curler
- Born: 23 December 1991 (age 34); Schaumburg, Illinois, U.S.

Team
- Curling club: CC Bern & CC Glarus
- Mixed doubles partner: Martin Rios

Curling career
- Member Association: Switzerland
- World Mixed Doubles Championship: 2 (2017, 2021)
- European Championship: 1 (2017)
- Olympic: 2 (2018, 2022)
Medal record
Women's curling
Representing Switzerland
Winter Olympics
| Silver medal – second place | 2018 Pyeongchang | Mixed doubles |
World Mixed Doubles Championship
| Gold medal – first place | 2017 Lethbridge |
European Mixed Championship
| Bronze medal – third place | 2014 Tårnby |

Jenny Sarah Perret (born 23 December 1991) is a Swiss curler from Lyss. She and partner Martin Rios won the 2017 World Mixed Doubles Curling Championship. The pair also represented Switzerland at the 2018 Winter Olympics where they won a silver medal.

In addition to her success in the mixed doubles discipline, Perret also won a bronze medal at the 2014 European Mixed Curling Championship and was the Swiss women's team alternate at the 2018 Winter Olympics.
