= Martin Rios (curler) =

Swiss-Spanish curler (born 1981)

- Curler
- Born: 24 May 1981 (age 45); Riedern, Switzerland

Team
- Curling club: CC Glarus
- Mixed doubles partner: Jenny Perret

Curling career
- Member Association: Switzerland
- World Mixed Doubles Championship: 4 (2012, 2013, 2017, 2021)
- European Championship: 2 (2007, 2008)
- Olympic: 2 (2018, 2022)
Medal record
Curling
Representing Switzerland
Winter Olympics
Silver medal – second place	2018 Pyeongchang	Mixed doubles
European Mixed Championship
Gold medal – first place	2011 Tårnby
Bronze medal – third place	2014 Tårnby
World Mixed Doubles Championship
Gold medal – first place	2012 Erzurum
Gold medal – first place	2017 Lethbridge

Martin Rios (born 24 May 1981) is a Spanish-Swiss curler. He competed in the 2018 Winter Olympics in the mixed doubles tournament with partner Jenny Perret, winning a silver medal. He is two-time (2012, 2017) World Mixed Doubles Champion and 2011 European Mixed Champion. At the 2012 World Mixed Doubles Curling Championship he was partnered with Nadine Lehmann and at the 2017 World Mixed Doubles Curling Championship he was paired with Perret. Rios also won a bronze medal at the 2014 European Mixed Curling Championship.

In addition to representing his native Switzerland, Rios has twice represented Spain internationally, at the 2007 and the 2008 European Curling Championships.

He currently serves as a national coach with the Swiss Curling Association.
