= Australia at the 2022 Winter Olympics =

- Flag of Australia
- IOC code: AUS
- NOC: Australian Olympic Committee
- Website: www.olympics.com.au

in Beijing, China 4–20 February 2022
- Competitors: 43 (21 men and 22 women) in 10 sports
- Flag bearers (opening): Brendan Kerry; Laura Peel
- Flag bearer (closing): Sami Kennedy-Sim
- Medals Ranked 18th: Gold 1 Silver 2 Bronze 1 Total 4

Winter Olympics appearances (overview)
- 1936; 1948; 1952; 1956; 1960; 1964; 1968; 1972; 1976; 1980; 1984; 1988; 1992; 1994; 1998; 2002; 2006; 2010; 2014; 2018; 2022; 2026

Australia competed at the 2022 Winter Olympics in Beijing, China, from 4 to 20 February 2022.

The Australian team consisted of 43 athletes (21 men and 22 women), competing in 10 sports. This marked a decrease of seven athletes from 2018. Alpine skier Madison Hoffman was selected but withdrew due to an ACL injury. Brendan Kerry and Laura Peel were the country's flagbearers during the opening ceremony. Freestyle skier Sami Kennedy-Sim was the closing ceremony flagbearer.

The use of Simplified Chinese stroke count placed it third-from-last in the Parade of Nations before the host nation of the next Winter Olympics (Italy) and the host nation (China) as it takes sixteen (16) strokes to write the first character (澳) of its Chinese name, more than any other participating country.

On 12 February, Jaclyn Narracott's silver medal in women's skeleton gave Australia its fourth medal at the games, breaking the nation's record for total medals won at a single Winter Olympics. This would again be broken in the 2026 Winter Olympics.

== Medallists ==
The following Australian competitors won medals at the games. In the "by discipline" sections below, medallists' names are bolded.

Medal	Name	Sport	Event	Date
Gold	Jakara Anthony	Freestyle skiing	Women's moguls	6 February
Silver	Scotty James	Snowboarding	Men's halfpipe	11 February
Silver	Jaclyn Narracott	Skeleton	Women's	12 February
Bronze	Tess Coady	Snowboarding	Women's slopestyle	6 February

== Competitors ==
The following is the list of number of competitors who participated at the Games per sport/discipline.

Sport	Men	Women	Total
Alpine skiing	1	2	3
Bobsleigh	0	2	2
Cross-country skiing	4	2	6
Curling	1	1	2
Figure skating	1	1	2
Freestyle skiing	4	9	13
Luge	1	0	1
Short track speed skating	1	0	1
Skeleton	1	1	2
Snowboarding	7	4	11
Total	21	22	43

== Alpine skiing ==
Australia qualified one male and two female alpine skiers.

Athlete	Event	Run 1		Run 2		Total	
Athlete	Event	Time	Rank	Time	Rank	Time	Rank
Louis Muhlen-Schulte	Men's giant slalom	1:08.44	32	1:10.01	21	2:18.48	23
Louis Muhlen-Schulte	Men's slalom	DNF		Did not advance			
Greta Small	Women's downhill	—N/a				1:36.53	26
Greta Small	Women's super-G	—N/a				1:16.97	31
Greta Small	Women's combined	1:34.38	18	1:00.17	13	2:34.55	13
Kathryn Parker	Women's slalom	DNF					

== Bobsleigh ==
Athlete	Event	Run 1		Run 2		Run 3		Run 4		Total	
Athlete	Event	Time	Rank	Time	Rank	Time	Rank	Time	Rank	Time	Rank
Bree Walker	Women's monobob	1:05.55	10	1:05.54	6	1:05.16	2	1:05.21	2	4:21.46	5
Kiara Reddingius; Bree Walker	Two-woman	1:01.98	15	1:02.11	11	1:02.04	11	1:02.51	20	4:08.64	16

== Cross-country skiing ==
Australia qualified three male and two female cross-country skiers, and added one more male quota during reallocation.

Due to high winds and adverse weather conditions, the men's 50 km freestyle competition on 19 February was shortened to 30 km.

Distance
Men

Athlete	Event	Classical		Freestyle		Total	
Athlete	Event	Time	Rank	Time	Rank	Time	Rank
Phillip Bellingham	Men's 15 km classical	—N/a				44:46.8	75
Seve de Campo	Men's 15 km classical	—N/a				44:21.2	72
Hugo Hinckfuss	Men's 15 km classical	—N/a				46:05.9	81
Lars Young Vik	Men's 15 km classical	—N/a				44:50.6	76
Phillip Bellingham	Men's 30 km skiathlon	LAP					65
Seve de Campo	Men's 30 km skiathlon	47:05.7	63	LAP			61
Phillip Bellingham	Men's 50 km freestyle	—N/a				1:23:03.8	53
Seve de Campo	Men's 50 km freestyle	—N/a				1:21:02.5	51

Women

Athlete	Event	Classical		Freestyle		Total	
Athlete	Event	Time	Rank	Time	Rank	Time	Rank
Casey Wright	Women's 10 km classical	—N/a				33:31.1	67
Jessica Yeaton	Women's 10 km classical	—N/a				31:54.6	51
Jessica Yeaton	Women's 15 km skiathlon	25:08.1	42	22:58.9	19	48:54.0	31
Casey Wright	Women's 30 km freestyle	—N/a				1:44:19.9	56
Jessica Yeaton	Women's 30 km freestyle	—N/a				1:37:06.1	43

Sprint
Men

Athlete	Event	Qualification		Quarterfinal		Semifinal		Final	
Athlete	Event	Time	Rank	Time	Rank	Time	Rank	Time	Rank
Phillip Bellingham	Men's sprint	3:01.57	50	Did not advance					
Seve de Campo	Men's sprint	3:04.81	63	Did not advance					
Hugo Hinckfuss	Men's sprint	3:04.44	61	Did not advance					
Lars Young Vik	Men's sprint	3:02.52	55	Did not advance					
Phillip Bellingham; Seve de Campo	Men's team sprint	—N/a				21:17.35	11	Did not advance	22

Women

Athlete	Event	Qualification		Quarterfinal		Semifinal		Final	
Athlete	Event	Time	Rank	Time	Rank	Time	Rank	Time	Rank
Casey Wright	Women's sprint	3:39.22	65	Did not advance					
Jessica Yeaton	Women's sprint	3:32.85	52	Did not advance					
Casey Wright; Jessica Yeaton	Women's team sprint	—N/a				25:13.4	8	Did not advance	16

== Curling ==
Australia's curling team consisted of two athletes (one per gender), competing in the mixed doubles tournament. This marked the country's debut in the sport at the Olympics. The team won two out of nine matches and did not advance to the medal round.

Summary

Team	Event	Round robin										Semifinal	Final / BM	
Team	Event	Opposition Score	Opposition Score	Opposition Score	Opposition Score	Opposition Score	Opposition Score	Opposition Score	Opposition Score	Opposition Score	Rank	Opposition Score	Opposition Score	Rank
Tahli Gill; Dean Hewitt	Mixed doubles tournament	USA; **L** 5–6	CHN; **L** 5–6	CZE; **L** 2–8	SWE; **L** 6–7	GBR; **L** 8–9	NOR; **L** 4–10	ITA; **L** 3–7	SUI; **W** 9–6	CAN; **W** 10–8	10	Did not advance		

=== Mixed doubles tournament ===
Australia qualified their mixed doubles team (two athletes), by finishing in the top two teams in the 2021 Olympic Qualification Event.

Final Round Robin Standings
Team	Athletes	Pld	W	L	W–L	PF	PA	EW	EL	BE	SE	S%	DSC	Qualification
Italy	Stefania Constantini / Amos Mosaner	9	9	0	–	79	48	43	28	0	17	79%	25.34	Playoffs
Norway	Kristin Skaslien / Magnus Nedregotten	9	6	3	1–0	68	50	40	28	0	15	82%	24.48	Playoffs
Great Britain	Jennifer Dodds / Bruce Mouat	9	6	3	0–1	60	50	38	33	0	12	79%	22.48	Playoffs
Sweden	Almida de Val / Oskar Eriksson	9	5	4	1–0	55	54	35	33	0	10	76%	21.77	Playoffs
Canada	Rachel Homan / John Morris	9	5	4	0–1	57	54	33	39	0	8	78%	53.73	
Czech Republic	Zuzana Paulová / Tomáš Paul	9	4	5	–	50	65	29	39	1	7	75%	33.41	
Switzerland	Jenny Perret / Martin Rios	9	3	6	1–0	55	58	32	39	0	6	73%	39.04	
United States	Vicky Persinger / Chris Plys	9	3	6	0–1	50	67	34	36	0	9	74%	27.29	
China	Fan Suyuan / Ling Zhi	9	2	7	1–0	51	64	34	36	0	7	74%	17.81	
Australia	Tahli Gill / Dean Hewitt	9	2	7	0–1	52	67	31	38	1	8	72%	50.51	

Round robin

Australia had a bye in draws 3, 9, 10 and 13.

Draw 1
Wednesday, 2 February, 20:05

**Sheet B**	**1**	**2**	**3**	**4**	**5**	**6**	**7**	**8**	**Final**
Australia (Gill / Hewitt) 🔨	1	0	1	0	0	3	0	0	**5**
**United States (Persinger / Plys)**	0	1	0	1	1	0	2	1	**6**

Draw 2
Thursday, 3 February, 9:05

**Sheet A**	**1**	**2**	**3**	**4**	**5**	**6**	**7**	**8**	**Final**
Australia (Gill / Hewitt)	0	1	0	0	0	3	0	1	**5**
**China (Fan / Ling) 🔨**	1	0	2	0	1	0	2	0	**6**

Draw 4
Thursday, 3 February, 20:05

**Sheet D**	**1**	**2**	**3**	**4**	**5**	**6**	**7**	**8**	**Final**
**Czech Republic (Paulová / Paul) 🔨**	1	3	1	0	1	0	2	X	**8**
Australia (Gill / Hewitt)	0	0	0	1	0	1	0	X	**2**

Draw 5
Friday, 4 February, 8:35

**Sheet B**	**1**	**2**	**3**	**4**	**5**	**6**	**7**	**8**	**Final**
**Sweden (de Val / Eriksson) 🔨**	1	0	1	1	1	0	3	0	**7**
Australia (Gill / Hewitt)	0	1	0	0	0	3	0	2	**6**

Draw 6
Friday, 4 February, 13:35

**Sheet C**	**1**	**2**	**3**	**4**	**5**	**6**	**7**	**8**	**9**	**Final**
**Great Britain (Dodds / Mouat) 🔨**	2	1	0	3	0	0	2	0	1	**9**
Australia (Gill / Hewitt)	0	0	1	0	3	2	0	2	0	**8**

Draw 7
Saturday, 5 February, 9:05

**Sheet C**	**1**	**2**	**3**	**4**	**5**	**6**	**7**	**8**	**Final**
Australia (Gill / Hewitt)	0	0	1	0	3	0	X	X	**4**
**Norway (Skaslien / Nedregotten) 🔨**	4	2	0	1	0	3	X	X	**10**

Draw 8
Saturday, 5 February, 14:05

**Sheet D**	**1**	**2**	**3**	**4**	**5**	**6**	**7**	**8**	**Final**
Australia (Gill / Hewitt)	1	0	0	1	0	1	0	X	**3**
**Italy (Constantini / Mosaner) 🔨**	0	2	1	0	1	0	3	X	**7**

Draw 11
Sunday, 6 February, 14:05

**Sheet B**	**1**	**2**	**3**	**4**	**5**	**6**	**7**	**8**	**Final**
**Australia (Gill / Hewitt) 🔨**	2	1	0	0	0	3	2	1	**9**
Switzerland (Perret / Rios)	0	0	1	3	2	0	0	0	**6**

Draw 12
Sunday, 6 February, 20:05

**Sheet A**	**1**	**2**	**3**	**4**	**5**	**6**	**7**	**8**	**9**	**Final**
Canada (Homan / Morris)	0	0	0	0	4	0	3	1	0	**8**
**Australia (Gill / Hewitt) 🔨**	3	2	1	1	0	1	0	0	2	**10**

== Figure skating ==
Australia earned one quota in Men's Singles and Women's Singles at the final Olympic Qualification Event, the 2021 Nebelhorn Trophy.

Athlete	Event	SP		FS		Total	
Athlete	Event	Points	Rank	Points	Rank	Points	Rank
Brendan Kerry	Men's singles	84.79	17 **Q**	160.01	16	244.80	17
Kailani Craine	Women's singles	49.93	29	Did not advance			

== Freestyle skiing ==
Aerials

Athlete	Event	Qualification				Final			
Athlete	Event	Jump 1		Jump 2		Jump 1		Jump 2	
Athlete	Event	Points	Rank	Points	Rank	Points	Rank	Points	Rank
Gabi Ash	Women's aerials	77.17	17	80.04	8	Did not advance			14
Laura Peel	Women's aerials	104.54	1 **Q**	Bye		100.02	4 **Q**	78.56	5
Danielle Scott	Women's aerials	96.23	4 **Q**	Bye		71.23	10	Did not advance	10

Freeski

Athlete	Event	Qualification				Final				
Athlete	Event	Run 1	Run 2	Best	Rank	Run 1	Run 2	Run 3	Best	Rank
Abi Harrigan	Women's slopestyle	16.10	26.31	26.31	26	Did not advance				

Moguls
Men

Athlete	Event	Qualification								Final											
Athlete	Event	Run 1				Run 2				Run 1				Run 2				Run 3			
Athlete	Event	Time	Points	Total	Rank	Time	Points	Total	Rank	Time	Points	Total	Rank	Time	Points	Total	Rank	Time	Points	Total	Rank
Matt Graham	Men's moguls	DNF				23.97	48.74	65.13	19	Did not advance											29
James Matheson	Men's moguls	26.10	58.28	71.86	20	25.76	59.17	73.20	14	Did not advance											24
Brodie Summers	Men's moguls	24.46	59.92	75.66	11	24.71	62.72	77.93	2 **Q**	24.40	60.13	76.15	12 **Q**	24.47	59.27	75.00	10	Did not advance			10
Cooper Woods	Men's moguls	26.45	61.53	74.65	14	24.01	60.40	76.74	4 **Q**	24.19	61.48	77.58	7 **Q**	25.02	62.21	77.22	5 **Q**	25.01	63.86	78.88	6

Women

Athlete	Event	Qualification								Final											
Athlete	Event	Run 1				Run 2				Run 1				Run 2				Run 3			
Athlete	Event	Time	Points	Total	Rank	Time	Points	Total	Rank	Time	Points	Total	Rank	Time	Points	Total	Rank	Time	Points	Total	Rank
**Jakara Anthony**	Women's moguls	27.96	67.26	83.75	1 **Q**	Bye				27.70	65.13	81.91	1 **Q**	27.82	64.64	81.29	1 **Q**	27.63	66.43	83.09	1st place, gold medalist(s)
Sophie Ash	Women's moguls	30.39	55.61	69.36	13	30.12	58.14	72.20	3 **Q**	30.57	56.92	70.47	16	Did not advance							16
Britteny Cox	Women's moguls	29.86	57.91	72.26	9 **Q**	Bye				30.04	58.89	73.04	14	Did not advance							14
Taylah O'Neill	Women's moguls	DNF				DNS				Did not advance											

Ski Cross

Athlete	Event	Seeding		1/8 final	Quarterfinal	Semifinal	Final	
Athlete	Event	Time	Rank	Position	Position	Position	Position	Rank
Sami Kennedy-Sim	Women's ski cross	1:19.14	11	1 **Q**	1 **Q**	4 **FB**	4	8

Qualification legend: Q - Qualify to next round; FA - Qualify to medal final; FB - Qualify to consolation final

== Luge ==
Based on the results during the 2021–22 Luge World Cup season, Australia qualified 1 sled in the men's singles.

Athlete	Event	Run 1		Run 2		Run 3		Run 4		Total	
Athlete	Event	Time	Rank	Time	Rank	Time	Rank	Time	Rank	Time	Rank
Alexander Ferlazzo	Men's singles	58.216	19	58.994	24	58.122	16	57.887	12	3:53.219	16

== Short track speed skating ==
Australia has qualified one male short track speed skater. Brendan Corey was named to the team in January 2022.

Athlete	Event	Heat		Quarterfinal		Semifinal		Final	
Athlete	Event	Time	Rank	Time	Rank	Time	Rank	Time	Rank
Brendan Corey	500 m	41.097	3	Did not advance					21
Brendan Corey	1000 m	1:23.908	2 **Q**	DSQ		Did not advance			15

== Skeleton ==
Athlete	Event	Run 1		Run 2		Run 3		Run 4		Total	
Athlete	Event	Time	Rank	Time	Rank	Time	Rank	Time	Rank	Time	Rank
Nick Timmings	Men's	1:03.76	25	1:02.83	24	1:01.78	20	Did not advance		3:08.37	25
**Jaclyn Narracott**	Women's	1:02.05	2	1:02.29	3	1:01.79	3	1:02.11	4	4:08.24	2nd place, silver medalist(s)

== Snowboarding ==
Freestyle

Athlete	Event	Qualification					Final				
Athlete	Event	Run 1	Run 2	Run 3	Best	Rank	Run 1	Run 2	Run 3	Best	Rank
Matthew Cox	Men's big air	56.25	~~19.00~~	13.75	70.00	28	Did not advance				
Matthew Cox	Men's slopestyle	~~34.46~~	39.98	—N/a	39.98	26	Did not advance				
Valentino Guseli	Men's halfpipe	~~31.75~~	85.75	—N/a	85.75	5 **Q**	~~75.75~~	79.75	~~79.75~~	79.75	6
**Scotty James**	Men's halfpipe	~~88.25~~	91.25	—N/a	91.25	2 **Q**	~~16.50~~	92.50	~~47.75~~	92.50	2nd place, silver medalist(s)
Emily Arthur	Women's halfpipe	62.50	~~19.75~~	—N/a	62.50	14	Did not advance				
**Tess Coady**	Women's big air	74.00	~~54.75~~	62.25	136.25	7 **Q**	85.00	29.75	~~8.50~~	114.75	9
**Tess Coady**	Women's slopestyle	~~55.98~~	71.13	—N/a	71.13	8 **Q**	~~82.68~~	~~55.98~~	84.15	84.15	3rd place, bronze medalist(s)

Snowboard Cross

Athlete	Event	Seeding		1/8 final	Quarterfinal	Semifinal	Final	
Athlete	Event	Time	Rank	Position	Position	Position	Position	Rank
Cam Bolton	Men's	1:17.92	8	1 **Q**	4	Did not advance		13
Adam Dickson	Men's	1:18.56	15	3	Did not advance			21
Jarryd Hughes	Men's	1:20.48	28	4	Did not advance			29
Adam Lambert	Men's	1:17.56	17	3	Did not advance			22
Josie Baff	Women's	1:25.11	14	3	Did not advance			18
Belle Brockhoff	Women's	1:24.72	18	2 **Q**	2 **Q**	2 **FA**	4	4
Cameron Bolton; Belle Brockhoff	Mixed team	—N/a			3	Did not advance		=9
Adam Lambert; Josie Baff	Mixed team	—N/a			4	Did not advance		=13

Qualification legend: Q - Qualify to next round; FA - Qualify to medal final

== See also ==
- Australia at the 2022 Winter Paralympics
