= Curling at the 2022 Winter Olympics =

Curling at the XXIV Olympic Winter Games
- Venue: Beijing National Aquatics Centre
- Dates: 2–20 February 2022
- No. of events: 3 (1 men, 1 women, 1 mixed)
- Competitors: 114 from 14 nations

Men's curling at the XXIV Olympic Winter Games

Medalists
1st place, gold medalist(s)		Sweden
2nd place, silver medalist(s)		Great Britain
3rd place, bronze medalist(s)		Canada

Women's curling at the XXIV Olympic Winter Games

Medalists
1st place, gold medalist(s)		Great Britain
2nd place, silver medalist(s)		Japan
3rd place, bronze medalist(s)		Sweden

Mixed doubles's curling at the XXIV Olympic Winter Games

Medalists
1st place, gold medalist(s)		Italy
2nd place, silver medalist(s)		Norway
3rd place, bronze medalist(s)		Sweden

The curling competitions of the 2022 Winter Olympics were held at the Beijing National Aquatics Centre, one of the Olympic Green venues. Curling competitions were scheduled for every day of the games, from February 2 to February 20. This was the eighth time that curling was part of the Olympic program.

In each of the men's, women's, and mixed doubles competitions, 10 nations competed. The mixed doubles competition was expanded for its second appearance in the Olympics. A total of 120 quota spots (60 per sex) were distributed to the sport of curling, an increase of four from the 2018 Winter Olympics. A total of 3 events were contested, one for men, one for women, and one mixed.

== Qualification ==
Qualification to the Men's and Women's curling tournaments at the Winter Olympics was determined through two methods (in addition to the host nation). Nations qualified teams by placing in the top six at the 2021 World Curling Championships. Teams could also qualify through Olympic qualification events which were held in 2021. Six nations qualified via World Championship qualification placement, while three nations qualified through qualification events. In men's and women's play, a host will be selected for the Olympic Qualification Event (OQE). They would be joined by the teams which competed at the 2021 World Championships but did not qualify for the Olympics, and two qualifiers from the Pre-Olympic Qualification Event (Pre-OQE). The Pre-OQE was open to all member associations.

For the mixed doubles competition in 2022, the tournament field was expanded from eight competitor nations to ten. The top seven ranked teams at the 2021 World Mixed Doubles Curling Championship qualified, along with two teams from the Olympic Qualification Event (OQE) – Mixed Doubles. This OQE was open to a nominated host and the fifteen nations with the highest qualification points not already qualified to the Olympics. As the host nation, China qualified teams automatically, thus making a total of ten teams per event in the curling tournaments.

Summary

Nations	Men	Women	Mixed doubles	Athletes
Australia			Yes	2
Canada	Yes	Yes	Yes	12
China	Yes	Yes	Yes	12
Czech Republic			Yes	2
Denmark	Yes	Yes		10
Great Britain	Yes	Yes	Yes	10
Italy	Yes		Yes	6
Japan		Yes		5
Norway	Yes		Yes	6
ROC	Yes	Yes		10
South Korea		Yes		5
Sweden	Yes	Yes	Yes	11
Switzerland	Yes	Yes	Yes	12
United States	Yes	Yes	Yes	11
Total: 14 NOCs	10	10	10	114

== Competition schedule ==
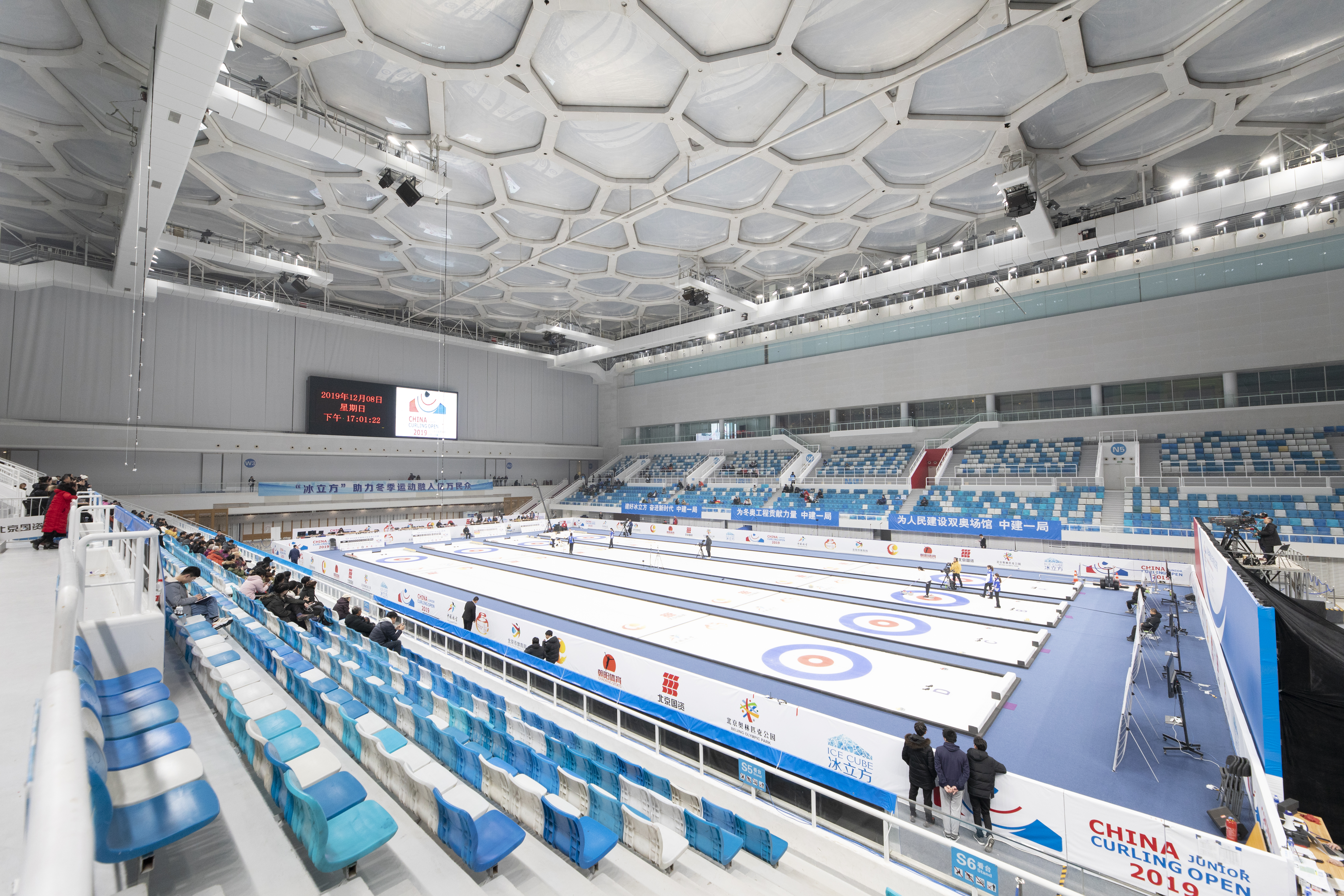
The Beijing National Aquatics Centre served as the venue of the curling competitions.

Curling competitions started two days before the Opening Ceremony and finished on the last day of the games, meaning the sport was the only one to have had a competition every day of the games. The following was the competition schedule for the curling competitions:

RR	Round robin	SF	Semifinals	B	3rd place play-off	F	Final

Date Event	Wed 2	Thu 3	Fri 4	Sat 5	Sun 6	Mon 7		Tue 8		Wed 9	Thu 10	Fri 11	Sat 12	Sun 13	Mon 14	Tue 15	Wed 16	Thu 17		Fri 18	Sat 19	Sun 20
Men's tournament										RR	RR	RR	RR	RR	RR	RR	RR	RR	SF	B	F	
Women's tournament											RR	RR	RR	RR	RR	RR	RR	RR		SF	B	F
Mixed doubles	RR	RR	RR	RR	RR	RR	SF	B	F													

== Medal summary ==
=== Medal table ===
Rank	Nation	Gold	Silver	Bronze	Total
1	Great Britain	1	1	0	2
2	Sweden	1	0	2	3
3	Italy	1	0	0	1
4	Japan	0	1	0	1
4	Norway	0	1	0	1
6	Canada	0	0	1	1
Totals (6 entries)		3	3	3	9

=== Medalists ===
Event	Gold	Silver	Bronze
Men	Sweden; Niklas Edin; Oskar Eriksson; Rasmus Wranå; Christoffer Sundgren; Daniel Magnusson	Great Britain; Bruce Mouat; Grant Hardie; Bobby Lammie; Hammy McMillan Jr. Ross Whyte	Canada; Brad Gushue; Mark Nichols; Brett Gallant; Geoff Walker; Marc Kennedy
Women	Great Britain; Eve Muirhead; Vicky Wright; Jennifer Dodds; Hailey Duff; Mili Smith	Japan; Satsuki Fujisawa; Chinami Yoshida; Yumi Suzuki; Yurika Yoshida; Kotomi Ishizaki	Sweden; Anna Hasselborg; Sara McManus; Agnes Knochenhauer; Sofia Mabergs; Johanna Heldin
Mixed doubles	Italy; Stefania Constantini; Amos Mosaner	Norway; Kristin Skaslien; Magnus Nedregotten	Sweden; Almida de Val; Oskar Eriksson

== Teams ==
=== Men ===
Canada	China	Denmark	Great Britain	Italy
Skip: Brad Gushue; Third: Mark Nichols; Second: Brett Gallant; Lead: Geoff Walker; Alternate: Marc Kennedy	Skip: Ma Xiuyue; Third: Zou Qiang; Second: Wang Zhiyu; Lead: Xu Jingtao; Alternate: Jiang Dongxu	Skip: Mikkel Krause; Third: Mads Nørgård; Second: Henrik Holtermann; Lead: Kasper Wiksten; Alternate: Tobias Thune	Skip: Bruce Mouat; Third: Grant Hardie; Second: Bobby Lammie; Lead: Hammy McMillan Jr. Alternate: Ross Whyte	Skip: Joël Retornaz; Third: Amos Mosaner; Second: Sebastiano Arman; Lead: Simone Gonin; Alternate: Mattia Giovanella
Norway	ROC	Sweden	Switzerland	United States
Skip: Steffen Walstad; Third: Torger Nergård; Second: Markus Høiberg; Lead: Magnus Vågberg; Alternate: Magnus Nedregotten	Skip: Sergey Glukhov; Third: Evgeny Klimov; Second: Dmitry Mironov; Lead: Anton Kalalb; Alternate: Daniil Goriachev	Skip: Niklas Edin; Third: Oskar Eriksson; Second: Rasmus Wranå; Lead: Christoffer Sundgren; Alternate: Daniel Magnusson	Fourth: Benoît Schwarz; Third: Sven Michel; Skip: Peter de Cruz; Lead: Valentin Tanner; Alternate: Pablo Lachat	Skip: John Shuster; Third: Chris Plys; Second: Matt Hamilton; Lead: John Landsteiner; Alternate: Colin Hufman

=== Women ===
Canada	China	Denmark	Great Britain	Japan
Skip: Jennifer Jones; Third: Kaitlyn Lawes; Second: Jocelyn Peterman; Lead: Dawn McEwen; Alternate: Lisa Weagle	Skip: Han Yu; Third: Wang Rui; Second: Dong Ziqi; Lead: Zhang Lijun; Alternate: Jiang Xindi	Skip: Madeleine Dupont; Third: Mathilde Halse; Second: Denise Dupont; Lead: My Larsen; Alternate: Jasmin Lander	Skip: Eve Muirhead; Third: Vicky Wright; Second: Jennifer Dodds; Lead: Hailey Duff; Alternate: Mili Smith	Skip: Satsuki Fujisawa; Third: Chinami Yoshida; Second: Yumi Suzuki; Lead: Yurika Yoshida; Alternate: Kotomi Ishizaki
ROC	South Korea	Sweden	Switzerland	United States
Skip: Alina Kovaleva; Third: Yulia Portunova; Second: Galina Arsenkina; Lead: Ekaterina Kuzmina; Alternate: Maria Komarova	Skip: Kim Eun-jung; Third: Kim Kyeong-ae; Second: Kim Cho-hi; Lead: Kim Seon-yeong; Alternate: Kim Yeong-mi	Skip: Anna Hasselborg; Third: Sara McManus; Second: Agnes Knochenhauer; Lead: Sofia Mabergs; Alternate: Johanna Heldin	Fourth: Alina Pätz; Skip: Silvana Tirinzoni; Second: Esther Neuenschwander; Lead: Melanie Barbezat; Alternate: Carole Howald	Skip: Tabitha Peterson; Third: Nina Roth; Second: Becca Hamilton; Lead: Tara Peterson; Alternate: Aileen Geving

=== Mixed doubles ===
Australia	Canada	China	Czech Republic	Great Britain
Female: Tahli Gill; Male: Dean Hewitt	Female: Rachel Homan; Male: John Morris	Female: Fan Suyuan; Male: Ling Zhi	Female: Zuzana Paulová; Male: Tomáš Paul	Female: Jennifer Dodds; Male: Bruce Mouat
Italy	Norway	Sweden	Switzerland	United States
Female: Stefania Constantini; Male: Amos Mosaner	Female: Kristin Skaslien; Male: Magnus Nedregotten	Female: Almida de Val; Male: Oskar Eriksson	Female: Jenny Perret; Male: Martin Rios	Female: Vicky Persinger; Male: Chris Plys

== Results summary ==
=== Men's tournament ===
==== Round robin ====
Standings

Final Round Robin Standings
Team	Skip	Pld	W	L	W–L	PF	PA	EW	EL	BE	SE	S%	DSC	Qualification
Great Britain	Bruce Mouat	9	8	1	–	63	44	39	31	5	10	88.0%	18.81	Playoffs
Sweden	Niklas Edin	9	7	2	–	64	44	43	30	10	11	85.7%	14.02	Playoffs
Canada	Brad Gushue	9	5	4	1–0	58	50	34	38	7	7	84.4%	26.49	Playoffs
United States	John Shuster	9	5	4	0–1	56	61	35	41	4	5	83.0%	32.29	Playoffs
China	Ma Xiuyue	9	4	5	2–1; 1–0	59	62	39	36	6	4	85.4%	23.55	
Norway	Steffen Walstad	9	4	5	2–1; 0–1	58	53	40	36	0	11	84.4%	20.96	
Switzerland	Peter de Cruz	9	4	5	1–2; 1–0	51	54	33	38	13	3	84.5%	15.74	
ROC	Sergey Glukhov	9	4	5	1–2; 0–1	58	58	33	38	6	6	81.2%	33.72	
Italy	Joël Retornaz	9	3	6	–	59	65	36	35	3	8	81.7%	30.76	
Denmark	Mikkel Krause	9	1	8	–	36	71	30	39	3	2	78.1%	32.84	

Results

Men's Round Robin Summary Table
Pos	Team	W	L	GBR	SWE	CAN	USA	CHN	NOR	SUI	ROC	ITA	DEN
1	Great Britain	8	1	—	7–6	5–2	7–9	7–6	8–3	6–5	8–6	7–5	8–2
2	Sweden	7	2	6–7	—	7–4	7–4	6–4	6–4	8–10	7–5	9–3	8–3
3	Canada	5	4	2–5	4–7	—	10–5	10–8	6–5	3–5	6–7	7–3	10–5
4	United States	5	4	9–7	4–7	5–10	—	8–6	6–7	7–4	6–5	4–10	7–5
5	China	4	5	6–7	4–6	8–10	6–8	—	8–6	6–5	4–7	12–9	5–4
6	Norway	4	5	3–8	4–6	5–6	7–6	6–8	—	7–4	12–5	9–4	5–6
7	Switzerland	4	5	5–6	10–8	5–3	4–7	5–6	4–7	—	6–3	4–8	8–6
8	ROC	4	5	6–8	5–7	7–6	5–6	7–4	5–12	3–6	—	10–7	10–2
9	Italy	3	6	5–7	3–9	3–7	10–4	9–12	4–9	8–4	7–10	—	10–3
10	Denmark	1	8	2–8	3–8	5–10	5–7	4–5	6–5	6–8	2–10	3–10	—

==== Playoffs ====
Semifinals
1	Great Britain	8
4	United States	4
2	Sweden	5
3	Canada	3

Gold medal game
1	Great Britain	4
2	Sweden	5
Bronze medal game
4	United States	5
3	Canada	8

===== Semifinals =====
Thursday, 17 February, 20:05

Sheet A	1	2	3	4	5	6	7	8	9	10	Final
Sweden (Edin) 🔨	0	1	0	2	0	0	0	1	0	1	5
Canada (Gushue)	0	0	1	0	2	0	0	0	0	0	3

Player percentages
Sweden		Canada	
Christoffer Sundgren	95%	Geoff Walker	93%
Rasmus Wranå	84%	Brett Gallant	69%
Oskar Eriksson	89%	Mark Nichols	79%
Niklas Edin	90%	Brad Gushue	76%
Total	90%	Total	79%

Sheet C	1	2	3	4	5	6	7	8	9	10	Final
United States (Shuster)	0	2	0	2	0	0	0	0	0	0	4
Great Britain (Mouat) 🔨	0	0	3	0	2	0	0	0	1	2	8

Player percentages
Great Britain		United States	
Hammy McMillan Jr.	96%	John Landsteiner	79%
Bobby Lammie	90%	Matt Hamilton	88%
Grant Hardie	84%	Chris Plys	73%
Bruce Mouat	90%	John Shuster	87%
Total	90%	Total	82%

===== Bronze medal game =====
Friday, 18 February, 14:05

Sheet B	1	2	3	4	5	6	7	8	9	10	Final
Canada (Gushue) 🔨	2	0	1	0	1	0	0	2	2	X	8
United States (Shuster)	0	1	0	2	0	2	0	0	0	X	5

Player percentages
United States		Canada	
John Landsteiner	80%	Geoff Walker	84%
Matt Hamilton	86%	Brett Gallant	86%
Chris Plys	74%	Mark Nichols	78%
John Shuster	69%	Brad Gushue	78%
Total	77%	Total	82%

===== Gold medal game =====
Saturday, 19 February, 14:50

Sheet B	1	2	3	4	5	6	7	8	9	10	11	Final
Sweden (Edin)	0	2	1	0	0	0	0	1	0	0	1	5
Great Britain (Mouat) 🔨	1	0	0	1	0	0	1	0	0	1	0	4

Player percentages
Great Britain		Sweden	
Hammy McMillan Jr.	95%	Christoffer Sundgren	99%
Bobby Lammie	80%	Rasmus Wranå	95%
Grant Hardie	94%	Oskar Eriksson	93%
Bruce Mouat	89%	Niklas Edin	87%
Total	90%	Total	94%

=== Women's tournament ===
==== Round robin ====
Standings

Final Round Robin Standings
Team	Skip	Pld	W	L	W–L	PF	PA	EW	EL	BE	SE	S%	DSC	Qualification
Switzerland	Silvana Tirinzoni	9	8	1	–	67	46	44	36	4	12	81.6%	19.14	Playoffs
Sweden	Anna Hasselborg	9	7	2	–	64	49	39	35	6	12	82.0%	25.02	Playoffs
Great Britain	Eve Muirhead	9	5	4	1–1	63	47	39	33	4	9	80.6%	35.27	Playoffs
Japan	Satsuki Fujisawa	9	5	4	1–1	64	62	40	36	2	13	82.3%	36.00	Playoffs
Canada	Jennifer Jones	9	5	4	1–1	71	59	42	41	1	14	80.4%	45.44	
United States	Tabitha Peterson	9	4	5	2–0	60	64	40	39	2	12	79.5%	33.87	
China	Han Yu	9	4	5	1–1	56	67	38	41	3	10	79.6%	30.06	
South Korea	Kim Eun-jung	9	4	5	0–2	62	66	40	42	3	10	80.8%	27.79	
Denmark	Madeleine Dupont	9	2	7	–	50	68	33	41	7	0	77.2%	23.36	
ROC	Alina Kovaleva	9	1	8	–	50	79	34	45	2	7	78.9%	29.34	

Results

Women's Round Robin Summary Table
Pos	Team	W	L	SUI	SWE	GBR	JPN	CAN	USA	CHN	KOR	DEN	ROC
1	Switzerland	8	1	—	5–6	6–5	8–4	8–4	9–6	7–5	8–4	8–5	8–7
2	Sweden	7	2	6–5	—	2–8	8–5	7–6	10–4	6–9	8–4	9–3	8–5
3	Great Britain	5	4	5–6	8–2	—	10–4	3–7	10–5	4–8	7–9	7–2	9–4
4	Japan	5	4	4–8	5–8	4–10	—	8–5	10–7	10–2	5–10	8–7	10–5
5	Canada	5	4	4–8	6–7	7–3	5–8	—	7–6	9–11	12–7	10–4	11–5
6	United States	4	5	6–9	4–10	5–10	7–10	6–7	—	8–4	8–6	7–5	9–3
7	China	4	5	5–7	9–6	8–4	2–10	11–9	4–8	—	6–5	6–7	5–11
8	South Korea	4	5	4–8	4–8	9–7	10–5	7–12	6–8	5–6	—	8–7	9–5
9	Denmark	2	7	5–8	3–9	2–7	7–8	4–10	5–7	7–6	7–8	—	10–5
10	ROC	1	8	7–8	5–8	4–9	5–10	5–11	3–9	11–5	5–9	5–10	—

==== Playoffs ====
Semifinals
1	Switzerland	6
4	Japan	8
2	Sweden	11
3	Great Britain	12

Gold medal game
4	Japan	3
3	Great Britain	10
Bronze medal game
1	Switzerland	7
2	Sweden	9

===== Semifinals =====
Friday, 18 February, 20:05

Sheet C	1	2	3	4	5	6	7	8	9	10	Final
Switzerland (Tirinzoni) 🔨	0	1	0	1	0	0	3	0	1	0	6
Japan (Fujisawa)	0	0	1	0	4	1	0	1	0	1	8

Player percentages
Switzerland		Japan	
Melanie Barbezat	81%	Yurika Yoshida	99%
Esther Neuenschwander	95%	Yumi Suzuki	85%
Silvana Tirinzoni	75%	Chinami Yoshida	81%
Alina Pätz	74%	Satsuki Fujisawa	89%
Total	81%	Total	88%

Sheet A	1	2	3	4	5	6	7	8	9	10	11	Final
Sweden (Hasselborg) 🔨	4	0	1	0	0	2	0	1	0	3	0	11
Great Britain (Muirhead)	0	3	0	1	1	0	2	0	4	0	1	12

Player percentages
Sweden		Great Britain	
Sofia Mabergs	93%	Hailey Duff	80%
Agnes Knochenhauer	91%	Jennifer Dodds	83%
Sara McManus	85%	Vicky Wright	86%
Anna Hasselborg	74%	Eve Muirhead	85%
Total	86%	Total	83%

===== Bronze medal game =====
Saturday, 19 February, 20:05

Sheet B	1	2	3	4	5	6	7	8	9	10	Final
Switzerland (Tirinzoni) 🔨	0	1	0	0	1	0	2	0	3	0	7
Sweden (Hasselborg)	1	0	0	2	0	3	0	2	0	1	9

Player percentages
Switzerland		Sweden	
Melanie Barbezat	79%	Sofia Mabergs	89%
Esther Neuenschwander	75%	Agnes Knochenhauer	80%
Silvana Tirinzoni	81%	Sara McManus	81%
Alina Pätz	64%	Anna Hasselborg	76%
Total	75%	Total	82%

===== Gold medal game =====
Sunday, 20 February, 9:05

Sheet B	1	2	3	4	5	6	7	8	9	10	Final
Japan (Fujisawa)	0	1	0	0	0	1	0	1	0	X	3
Great Britain (Muirhead) 🔨	2	0	0	1	1	0	4	0	2	X	10

Player percentages
Japan		Great Britain	
Yurika Yoshida	97%	Hailey Duff	90%
Yumi Suzuki	82%	Jennifer Dodds	89%
Chinami Yoshida	64%	Vicky Wright	89%
Satsuki Fujisawa	69%	Eve Muirhead	88%
Total	78%	Total	89%

=== Mixed doubles tournament ===
==== Round robin ====
Standings

Final Round Robin Standings
Team	Athletes	Pld	W	L	W–L	PF	PA	EW	EL	BE	SE	S%	DSC	Qualification
Italy	Stefania Constantini / Amos Mosaner	9	9	0	–	79	48	43	28	0	17	79%	25.34	Playoffs
Norway	Kristin Skaslien / Magnus Nedregotten	9	6	3	1–0	68	50	40	28	0	15	82%	24.48	Playoffs
Great Britain	Jennifer Dodds / Bruce Mouat	9	6	3	0–1	60	50	38	33	0	12	79%	22.48	Playoffs
Sweden	Almida de Val / Oskar Eriksson	9	5	4	1–0	55	54	35	33	0	10	76%	21.77	Playoffs
Canada	Rachel Homan / John Morris	9	5	4	0–1	57	54	33	39	0	8	78%	53.73	
Czech Republic	Zuzana Paulová / Tomáš Paul	9	4	5	–	50	65	29	39	1	7	75%	33.41	
Switzerland	Jenny Perret / Martin Rios	9	3	6	1–0	55	58	32	39	0	6	73%	39.04	
United States	Vicky Persinger / Chris Plys	9	3	6	0–1	50	67	34	36	0	9	74%	27.29	
China	Fan Suyuan / Ling Zhi	9	2	7	1–0	51	64	34	36	0	7	74%	17.81	
Australia	Tahli Gill / Dean Hewitt	9	2	7	0–1	52	67	31	38	1	8	72%	50.51	

Results

Mixed Doubles Round Robin Summary Table
Pos	Team	W	L	ITA	NOR	GBR	SWE	CAN	CZE	SUI	USA	CHN	AUS
1	Italy	9	0	—	11–8	7–5	12–8	8–7	10–2	8–7	8–4	8–4	7–3
2	Norway	6	3	8–11	—	6–2	6–2	6–7	6–7	6–5	11–6	9–6	10–4
3	Great Britain	6	3	5–7	2–6	—	9–5	6–4	8–3	7–8	8–4	6–5	9–8
4	Sweden	5	4	8–12	2–6	5–9	—	6–2	7–4	6–1	7–8	7–6	7–6
5	Canada	5	4	7–8	7–6	4–6	2–6	—	6–5	7–5	7–2	8–6	8–10
6	Czech Republic	4	5	2–10	7–6	3–8	4–7	5–6	—	3–11	10–8	8–6	8–2
7	Switzerland	3	6	7–8	5–6	8–7	1–6	5–7	11–3	—	6–5	6–7	6–9
8	United States	3	6	4–8	6–11	4–8	8–7	2–7	8–10	5–6	—	7–5	6–5
9	China	2	7	4–8	6–9	5–6	6–7	6–8	6–8	7–6	5–7	—	6–5
10	Australia	2	7	3–7	4–10	8–9	6–7	10–8	2–8	9–6	5–6	5–6	—

==== Playoffs ====
Semifinals
1	Italy	8
4	Sweden	1
2	Norway	6
3	Great Britain	5

Gold medal game
1	Italy	8
2	Norway	5
Bronze medal game
4	Sweden	9
3	Great Britain	3

===== Semifinals =====
Monday, 7 February, 20:05

Sheet C	1	2	3	4	5	6	7	8	Final
Italy (Constantini / Mosaner) 🔨	1	1	2	1	1	0	2	X	8
Sweden (de Val / Eriksson)	0	0	0	0	0	1	0	X	1

Player percentages
Italy		Sweden	
Stefania Constantini	84%	Almida de Val	52%
Amos Mosaner	94%	Oskar Eriksson	76%
Total	89%	Total	64%

Sheet A	1	2	3	4	5	6	7	8	Final
Norway (Skaslien / Nedregotten) 🔨	0	1	0	1	0	3	0	1	6
Great Britain (Dodds / Mouat)	1	0	2	0	1	0	1	0	5

Player percentages
Norway		Great Britain	
Kristin Skaslien	81%	Jennifer Dodds	83%
Magnus Nedregotten	85%	Bruce Mouat	81%
Total	83%	Total	82%

===== Bronze medal game =====
Tuesday, 8 February, 14:05

Sheet B	1	2	3	4	5	6	7	8	Final
Sweden (de Val / Eriksson)	0	4	3	1	1	0	X	X	9
Great Britain (Dodds / Mouat) 🔨	1	0	0	0	0	2	X	X	3

Player percentages
Sweden		Great Britain	
Almida de Val	100%	Jennifer Dodds	56%
Oskar Eriksson	82%	Bruce Mouat	85%
Total	89%	Total	73%

===== Gold medal game =====
Tuesday, 8 February, 20:05

Sheet B	1	2	3	4	5	6	7	8	Final
Italy (Constantini / Mosaner) 🔨	0	2	1	3	0	1	0	1	8
Norway (Skaslien / Nedregotten)	2	0	0	0	1	0	2	0	5

Player percentages
Italy		Norway	
Stefania Constantini	83%	Kristin Skaslien	70%
Amos Mosaner	90%	Magnus Nedregotten	69%
Total	87%	Total	69%

== Participating nations ==
A total of 114 athletes from 14 nations (including the IOC's designation of ROC) were scheduled to participate (the numbers of athletes are shown in parentheses). Some curlers competed in both the 4-person and mixed doubles tournament, therefore, the numbers included on this list are the total athletes sent by each NOC to the Olympics, not how many athletes they qualified. Both Australia and the Czech Republic made their Olympic sport debuts.

- Australia (2)
- Canada (12)
- China (12)
- Czech Republic (2)
- Denmark (10)
- Great Britain (10)
- Italy (6)
- Japan (5)
- Norway (6)
- ROC (10)
- South Korea (5)
- Sweden (11)
- Switzerland (12)
- United States (11)
