= Curling at the 2022 Winter Olympics – Mixed doubles tournament =

Mixed doubles curling at the XXIV Olympic Winter Games
- Venue: Beijing National Aquatics Center
- Dates: 2–8 February
- Competitors: 20 from 10 nations

Medalists
| 1st place, gold medalist(s) | | Stefania Constantini; Amos Mosaner | Italy |
| 2nd place, silver medalist(s) | | Kristin Skaslien; Magnus Nedregotten | Norway |
| 3rd place, bronze medalist(s) | | Almida de Val; Oskar Eriksson | Sweden |

The mixed doubles curling tournament of the 2022 Winter Olympics was held at the Beijing National Aquatics Center from 2 to 8 February 2022. Ten nations competed in a round robin preliminary round, and the top four nations at the conclusion of the round robin (Norway, Italy, Great Britain, and Sweden) qualified for the medal round. This was the second time mixed doubles was held at the Winter Olympics. Italy defeated Norway in the final to claim the gold medal. Sweden won the bronze medal play-off against Great Britain.

== Qualification ==
The top seven nations at the 2021 World Mixed Doubles Curling Championship qualified along with hosts China. The final two teams qualified through the 2021 Olympic Qualification Event.

| Means of qualification | Dates | Location | Quotas | Qualified |
|---|---|---|---|---|
| Host nation | —N/a | | 1 | China |
| 2021 World Mixed Doubles Curling Championship | 17–23 May 2021 | Aberdeen, United Kingdom | 7 | Great Britain; Norway; Sweden; Canada; Italy; Switzerland; Czech Republic |
| Olympic Qualification Event | 5–9 December 2021 | Leeuwarden, Netherlands | 2 | Australia; United States |
| Total | | | 10 | |

== Teams ==
Teams have one male and one female thrower, with one curler throwing rocks #1 and #5 and the other throwing rocks #2, #3 and #4.

| Australia | Canada | China | Czech Republic | Great Britain |
|---|---|---|---|---|
| Female: Tahli Gill; Male: Dean Hewitt | Female: Rachel Homan; Male: John Morris | Female: Fan Suyuan; Male: Ling Zhi | Female: Zuzana Paulová; Male: Tomáš Paul | Female: Jennifer Dodds; Male: Bruce Mouat |
| Italy | Norway | Sweden | Switzerland | United States |
| Female: Stefania Constantini; Male: Amos Mosaner | Female: Kristin Skaslien; Male: Magnus Nedregotten | Female: Almida de Val; Male: Oskar Eriksson | Female: Jenny Perret; Male: Martin Rios | Female: Vicky Persinger; Male: Chris Plys |

== Round-robin standings ==
Final Round Robin Standings
| Team | Athletes | Pld | W | L | W–L | PF | PA | EW | EL | BE | SE | S% | DSC | Qualification |
|---|---|---|---|---|---|---|---|---|---|---|---|---|---|---|
| Italy | Stefania Constantini / Amos Mosaner | 9 | 9 | 0 | – | 79 | 48 | 43 | 28 | 0 | 17 | 79% | 25.34 | Playoffs |
| Norway | Kristin Skaslien / Magnus Nedregotten | 9 | 6 | 3 | 1–0 | 68 | 50 | 40 | 28 | 0 | 15 | 82% | 24.48 | Playoffs |
| Great Britain | Jennifer Dodds / Bruce Mouat | 9 | 6 | 3 | 0–1 | 60 | 50 | 38 | 33 | 0 | 12 | 79% | 22.48 | Playoffs |
| Sweden | Almida de Val / Oskar Eriksson | 9 | 5 | 4 | 1–0 | 55 | 54 | 35 | 33 | 0 | 10 | 76% | 21.77 | Playoffs |
| Canada | Rachel Homan / John Morris | 9 | 5 | 4 | 0–1 | 57 | 54 | 33 | 39 | 0 | 8 | 78% | 53.73 | |
| Czech Republic | Zuzana Paulová / Tomáš Paul | 9 | 4 | 5 | – | 50 | 65 | 29 | 39 | 1 | 7 | 75% | 33.41 | |
| Switzerland | Jenny Perret / Martin Rios | 9 | 3 | 6 | 1–0 | 55 | 58 | 32 | 39 | 0 | 6 | 73% | 39.04 | |
| United States | Vicky Persinger / Chris Plys | 9 | 3 | 6 | 0–1 | 50 | 67 | 34 | 36 | 0 | 9 | 74% | 27.29 | |
| China | Fan Suyuan / Ling Zhi | 9 | 2 | 7 | 1–0 | 51 | 64 | 34 | 36 | 0 | 7 | 74% | 17.81 | |
| Australia | Tahli Gill / Dean Hewitt | 9 | 2 | 7 | 0–1 | 52 | 67 | 31 | 38 | 1 | 8 | 72% | 50.51 | |

Mixed Doubles Round Robin Summary Table
| Pos | Team | W | L | ITA | NOR | GBR | SWE | CAN | CZE | SUI | USA | CHN | AUS |
|---|---|---|---|---|---|---|---|---|---|---|---|---|---|
| 1 | Italy | 9 | 0 | — | 11–8 | 7–5 | 12–8 | 8–7 | 10–2 | 8–7 | 8–4 | 8–4 | 7–3 |
| 2 | Norway | 6 | 3 | 8–11 | — | 6–2 | 6–2 | 6–7 | 6–7 | 6–5 | 11–6 | 9–6 | 10–4 |
| 3 | Great Britain | 6 | 3 | 5–7 | 2–6 | — | 9–5 | 6–4 | 8–3 | 7–8 | 8–4 | 6–5 | 9–8 |
| 4 | Sweden | 5 | 4 | 8–12 | 2–6 | 5–9 | — | 6–2 | 7–4 | 6–1 | 7–8 | 7–6 | 7–6 |
| 5 | Canada | 5 | 4 | 7–8 | 7–6 | 4–6 | 2–6 | — | 6–5 | 7–5 | 7–2 | 8–6 | 8–10 |
| 6 | Czech Republic | 4 | 5 | 2–10 | 7–6 | 3–8 | 4–7 | 5–6 | — | 3–11 | 10–8 | 8–6 | 8–2 |
| 7 | Switzerland | 3 | 6 | 7–8 | 5–6 | 8–7 | 1–6 | 5–7 | 11–3 | — | 6–5 | 6–7 | 6–9 |
| 8 | United States | 3 | 6 | 4–8 | 6–11 | 4–8 | 8–7 | 2–7 | 8–10 | 5–6 | — | 7–5 | 6–5 |
| 9 | China | 2 | 7 | 4–8 | 6–9 | 5–6 | 6–7 | 6–8 | 6–8 | 7–6 | 5–7 | — | 6–5 |
| 10 | Australia | 2 | 7 | 3–7 | 4–10 | 8–9 | 6–7 | 10–8 | 2–8 | 9–6 | 5–6 | 5–6 | — |

== Round-robin results ==
All draw times are listed in China Standard Time (UTC+08:00).

=== Draw 1 ===
Wednesday, 2 February, 20:05

| Sheet A | 1 | 2 | 3 | 4 | 5 | 6 | 7 | 8 | Final |
| Sweden (de Val / Eriksson) | 0 | 2 | 0 | 1 | 2 | 0 | 0 | 0 | 5 |
| Great Britain (Dodds / Mouat) 🔨 | 1 | 0 | 3 | 0 | 0 | 1 | 3 | 1 | 9 |

| Sheet B | 1 | 2 | 3 | 4 | 5 | 6 | 7 | 8 | Final |
| Australia (Gill / Hewitt) 🔨 | 1 | 0 | 1 | 0 | 0 | 3 | 0 | 0 | 5 |
| United States (Persinger / Plys) | 0 | 1 | 0 | 1 | 1 | 0 | 2 | 1 | 6 |

| Sheet C | 1 | 2 | 3 | 4 | 5 | 6 | 7 | 8 | 9 | Final |
| Norway (Skaslien / Nedregotten) | 1 | 1 | 0 | 1 | 0 | 2 | 1 | 0 | 0 | 6 |
| Czech Republic (Paulová / Paul) 🔨 | 0 | 0 | 2 | 0 | 1 | 0 | 0 | 3 | 1 | 7 |

| Sheet D | 1 | 2 | 3 | 4 | 5 | 6 | 7 | 8 | 9 | Final |
| China (Fan / Ling) 🔨 | 1 | 1 | 1 | 0 | 1 | 0 | 2 | 0 | 1 | 7 |
| Switzerland (Perret / Rios) | 0 | 0 | 0 | 2 | 0 | 3 | 0 | 1 | 0 | 6 |

=== Draw 2 ===
Thursday, 3 February, 09:05

| Sheet A | 1 | 2 | 3 | 4 | 5 | 6 | 7 | 8 | Final |
| Australia (Gill / Hewitt) | 0 | 1 | 0 | 0 | 0 | 3 | 0 | 1 | 5 |
| China (Fan / Ling) 🔨 | 1 | 0 | 2 | 0 | 1 | 0 | 2 | 0 | 6 |

| Sheet B | 1 | 2 | 3 | 4 | 5 | 6 | 7 | 8 | Final |
| Sweden (de Val / Eriksson) 🔨 | 1 | 0 | 0 | 1 | 1 | 0 | 2 | 2 | 7 |
| Czech Republic (Paulová / Paul) | 0 | 1 | 1 | 0 | 0 | 2 | 0 | 0 | 4 |

| Sheet C | 1 | 2 | 3 | 4 | 5 | 6 | 7 | 8 | Final |
| United States (Persinger / Plys) 🔨 | 1 | 0 | 0 | 1 | 1 | 1 | 0 | 0 | 4 |
| Italy (Constantini / Mosaner) | 0 | 4 | 1 | 0 | 0 | 0 | 1 | 2 | 8 |

| Sheet D | 1 | 2 | 3 | 4 | 5 | 6 | 7 | 8 | Final |
| Great Britain (Dodds / Mouat) | 0 | 1 | 1 | 0 | 1 | 0 | 2 | 1 | 6 |
| Canada (Homan / Morris) 🔨 | 1 | 0 | 0 | 1 | 0 | 2 | 0 | 0 | 4 |

=== Draw 3 ===
Thursday, 3 February, 14:05

| Sheet A | 1 | 2 | 3 | 4 | 5 | 6 | 7 | 8 | 9 | Final |
| Italy (Constantini / Mosaner) | 0 | 3 | 0 | 1 | 1 | 0 | 2 | 0 | 1 | 8 |
| Switzerland (Perret / Rios) 🔨 | 1 | 0 | 2 | 0 | 0 | 3 | 0 | 1 | 0 | 7 |

| Sheet B | 1 | 2 | 3 | 4 | 5 | 6 | 7 | 8 | Final |
| United States (Persinger / Plys) 🔨 | 1 | 0 | 2 | 0 | 3 | 0 | 0 | 0 | 6 |
| Norway (Skaslien / Nedregotten) | 0 | 1 | 0 | 2 | 0 | 3 | 3 | 2 | 11 |

=== Draw 4 ===
Thursday, 3 February, 20:05

| Sheet A | 1 | 2 | 3 | 4 | 5 | 6 | 7 | 8 | Final |
| Norway (Skaslien / Nedregotten) 🔨 | 2 | 0 | 1 | 0 | 2 | 0 | 1 | 0 | 6 |
| Canada (Homan / Morris) | 0 | 4 | 0 | 1 | 0 | 1 | 0 | 1 | 7 |

| Sheet B | 1 | 2 | 3 | 4 | 5 | 6 | 7 | 8 | Final |
| Switzerland (Perret / Rios) | 0 | 3 | 0 | 3 | 0 | 1 | 0 | 1 | 8 |
| Great Britain (Dodds / Mouat) 🔨 | 1 | 0 | 2 | 0 | 1 | 0 | 3 | 0 | 7 |

| Sheet C | 1 | 2 | 3 | 4 | 5 | 6 | 7 | 8 | Final |
| China (Fan / Ling) | 0 | 2 | 0 | 1 | 1 | 0 | 2 | 0 | 6 |
| Sweden (de Val / Eriksson) 🔨 | 1 | 0 | 2 | 0 | 0 | 1 | 0 | 3 | 7 |

| Sheet D | 1 | 2 | 3 | 4 | 5 | 6 | 7 | 8 | Final |
| Czech Republic (Paulová / Paul) 🔨 | 1 | 3 | 1 | 0 | 1 | 0 | 2 | X | 8 |
| Australia (Gill / Hewitt) | 0 | 0 | 0 | 1 | 0 | 1 | 0 | X | 2 |

=== Draw 5 ===
Friday, 4 February, 08:35

| Sheet B | 1 | 2 | 3 | 4 | 5 | 6 | 7 | 8 | Final |
| Sweden (de Val / Eriksson) 🔨 | 1 | 0 | 1 | 1 | 1 | 0 | 3 | 0 | 7 |
| Australia (Gill / Hewitt) | 0 | 1 | 0 | 0 | 0 | 3 | 0 | 2 | 6 |

| Sheet C | 1 | 2 | 3 | 4 | 5 | 6 | 7 | 8 | Final |
| Canada (Homan / Morris) | 3 | 0 | 1 | 0 | 2 | 0 | 1 | 0 | 7 |
| Switzerland (Perret / Rios) 🔨 | 0 | 1 | 0 | 1 | 0 | 2 | 0 | 1 | 5 |

| Sheet D | 1 | 2 | 3 | 4 | 5 | 6 | 7 | 8 | Final |
| Italy (Constantini / Mosaner) | 3 | 0 | 2 | 0 | 2 | 2 | 0 | 2 | 11 |
| Norway (Skaslien / Nedregotten) 🔨 | 0 | 5 | 0 | 1 | 0 | 0 | 2 | 0 | 8 |

=== Draw 6 ===
Friday, 4 February, 13:35

| Sheet A | 1 | 2 | 3 | 4 | 5 | 6 | 7 | 8 | Final |
| Czech Republic (Paulová / Paul) | 0 | 0 | 1 | 0 | 0 | 1 | X | X | 2 |
| Italy (Constantini / Mosaner) 🔨 | 4 | 1 | 0 | 4 | 1 | 0 | X | X | 10 |

| Sheet B | 1 | 2 | 3 | 4 | 5 | 6 | 7 | 8 | Final |
| China (Fan / Ling) 🔨 | 1 | 0 | 0 | 2 | 0 | 1 | 0 | 2 | 6 |
| Canada (Homan / Morris) | 0 | 2 | 2 | 0 | 2 | 0 | 2 | 0 | 8 |

| Sheet C | 1 | 2 | 3 | 4 | 5 | 6 | 7 | 8 | 9 | Final |
| Great Britain (Dodds / Mouat) 🔨 | 2 | 1 | 0 | 3 | 0 | 0 | 2 | 0 | 1 | 9 |
| Australia (Gill / Hewitt) | 0 | 0 | 1 | 0 | 3 | 2 | 0 | 2 | 0 | 8 |

| Sheet D | 1 | 2 | 3 | 4 | 5 | 6 | 7 | 8 | 9 | Final |
| Sweden (de Val / Eriksson) 🔨 | 1 | 0 | 1 | 0 | 0 | 3 | 0 | 2 | 0 | 7 |
| United States (Persinger / Plys) | 0 | 1 | 0 | 1 | 2 | 0 | 3 | 0 | 1 | 8 |

=== Draw 7 ===
Saturday, 5 February, 09:05

| Sheet C | 1 | 2 | 3 | 4 | 5 | 6 | 7 | 8 | Final |
| Australia (Gill / Hewitt) | 0 | 0 | 1 | 0 | 3 | 0 | X | X | 4 |
| Norway (Skaslien / Nedregotten) 🔨 | 4 | 2 | 0 | 1 | 0 | 3 | X | X | 10 |

| Sheet D | 1 | 2 | 3 | 4 | 5 | 6 | 7 | 8 | Final |
| Switzerland (Perret / Rios) | 0 | 1 | 0 | 0 | 0 | 0 | X | X | 1 |
| Sweden (de Val / Eriksson) 🔨 | 2 | 0 | 1 | 1 | 1 | 1 | X | X | 6 |

=== Draw 8 ===
Saturday, 5 February, 14:05

| Sheet A | 1 | 2 | 3 | 4 | 5 | 6 | 7 | 8 | Final |
| China (Fan / Ling) | 0 | 1 | 0 | 2 | 0 | 2 | 0 | X | 5 |
| United States (Persinger / Plys) 🔨 | 2 | 0 | 1 | 0 | 3 | 0 | 1 | X | 7 |

| Sheet B | 1 | 2 | 3 | 4 | 5 | 6 | 7 | 8 | Final |
| Czech Republic (Paulová / Paul) 🔨 | 1 | 0 | 0 | 1 | 0 | 1 | 0 | X | 3 |
| Great Britain (Dodds / Mouat) | 0 | 2 | 3 | 0 | 1 | 0 | 2 | X | 8 |

| Sheet C | 1 | 2 | 3 | 4 | 5 | 6 | 7 | 8 | Final |
| Sweden (de Val / Eriksson) | 1 | 1 | 0 | 3 | 0 | 1 | X | X | 6 |
| Canada (Homan / Morris) 🔨 | 0 | 0 | 1 | 0 | 1 | 0 | X | X | 2 |

| Sheet D | 1 | 2 | 3 | 4 | 5 | 6 | 7 | 8 | Final |
| Australia (Gill / Hewitt) | 1 | 0 | 0 | 1 | 0 | 1 | 0 | X | 3 |
| Italy (Constantini / Mosaner) 🔨 | 0 | 2 | 1 | 0 | 1 | 0 | 3 | X | 7 |

=== Draw 9 ===
Saturday, 5 February, 20:05

| Sheet A | 1 | 2 | 3 | 4 | 5 | 6 | 7 | 8 | Final |
| Great Britain (Dodds / Mouat) | 0 | 1 | 1 | 0 | 0 | 2 | 0 | 1 | 5 |
| Italy (Constantini / Mosaner) 🔨 | 1 | 0 | 0 | 2 | 1 | 0 | 3 | 0 | 7 |

| Sheet B | 1 | 2 | 3 | 4 | 5 | 6 | 7 | 8 | Final |
| Norway (Skaslien / Nedregotten) | 0 | 2 | 1 | 1 | 0 | 5 | 0 | X | 9 |
| China (Fan / Ling) 🔨 | 1 | 0 | 0 | 0 | 2 | 0 | 3 | X | 6 |

| Sheet C | 1 | 2 | 3 | 4 | 5 | 6 | 7 | 8 | Final |
| Czech Republic (Paulová / Paul) | 0 | 0 | 0 | 0 | 0 | 3 | 0 | X | 3 |
| Switzerland (Perret / Rios) 🔨 | 3 | 1 | 3 | 2 | 1 | 0 | 1 | X | 11 |

| Sheet D | 1 | 2 | 3 | 4 | 5 | 6 | 7 | 8 | Final |
| United States (Persinger / Plys) 🔨 | 1 | 0 | 1 | 0 | 0 | 0 | 0 | X | 2 |
| Canada (Homan / Morris) | 0 | 1 | 0 | 1 | 1 | 1 | 3 | X | 7 |

=== Draw 10 ===
Sunday, 6 February, 09:05

| Sheet A | 1 | 2 | 3 | 4 | 5 | 6 | 7 | 8 | Final |
| United States (Persinger / Plys) | 1 | 0 | 3 | 0 | 3 | 0 | 1 | 0 | 8 |
| Czech Republic (Paulová / Paul) 🔨 | 0 | 3 | 0 | 4 | 0 | 0 | 0 | 3 | 10 |

| Sheet B | 1 | 2 | 3 | 4 | 5 | 6 | 7 | 8 | Final |
| Great Britain (Dodds / Mouat) | 1 | 0 | 0 | 0 | 3 | 1 | 0 | 1 | 6 |
| China (Fan / Ling) 🔨 | 0 | 2 | 1 | 1 | 0 | 0 | 1 | 0 | 5 |

=== Draw 11 ===
Sunday, 6 February, 14:05

| Sheet A | 1 | 2 | 3 | 4 | 5 | 6 | 7 | 8 | Final |
| Norway (Skaslien / Nedregotten) 🔨 | 2 | 0 | 1 | 0 | 1 | 1 | 1 | X | 6 |
| Sweden (de Val / Eriksson) | 0 | 1 | 0 | 1 | 0 | 0 | 0 | X | 2 |

| Sheet B | 1 | 2 | 3 | 4 | 5 | 6 | 7 | 8 | Final |
| Australia (Gill / Hewitt) 🔨 | 2 | 1 | 0 | 0 | 0 | 3 | 2 | 1 | 9 |
| Switzerland (Perret / Rios) | 0 | 0 | 1 | 3 | 2 | 0 | 0 | 0 | 6 |

| Sheet C | 1 | 2 | 3 | 4 | 5 | 6 | 7 | 8 | Final |
| Italy (Constantini / Mosaner) | 3 | 1 | 0 | 1 | 0 | 1 | 1 | 1 | 8 |
| China (Fan / Ling) 🔨 | 0 | 0 | 1 | 0 | 3 | 0 | 0 | 0 | 4 |

| Sheet D | 1 | 2 | 3 | 4 | 5 | 6 | 7 | 8 | 9 | Final |
| Canada (Homan / Morris) | 0 | 1 | 0 | 1 | 1 | 0 | 0 | 2 | 2 | 7 |
| Czech Republic (Paulová / Paul) 🔨 | 1 | 0 | 1 | 0 | 0 | 2 | 1 | 0 | 0 | 5 |

=== Draw 12 ===
Sunday, 6 February, 20:05

| Sheet A | 1 | 2 | 3 | 4 | 5 | 6 | 7 | 8 | 9 | Final |
| Canada (Homan / Morris) | 0 | 0 | 0 | 0 | 4 | 0 | 3 | 1 | 0 | 8 |
| Australia (Gill / Hewitt) 🔨 | 3 | 2 | 1 | 1 | 0 | 1 | 0 | 0 | 2 | 10 |

| Sheet B | 1 | 2 | 3 | 4 | 5 | 6 | 7 | 8 | Final |
| Italy (Constantini / Mosaner) | 0 | 1 | 1 | 1 | 0 | 5 | 0 | 4 | 12 |
| Sweden (de Val / Eriksson) 🔨 | 2 | 0 | 0 | 0 | 3 | 0 | 3 | 0 | 8 |

| Sheet C | 1 | 2 | 3 | 4 | 5 | 6 | 7 | 8 | Final |
| Switzerland (Perret / Rios) 🔨 | 3 | 0 | 0 | 1 | 0 | 1 | 0 | 1 | 6 |
| United States (Persinger / Plys) | 0 | 1 | 1 | 0 | 1 | 0 | 2 | 0 | 5 |

| Sheet D | 1 | 2 | 3 | 4 | 5 | 6 | 7 | 8 | Final |
| Norway (Skaslien / Nedregotten) | 1 | 1 | 0 | 1 | 1 | 0 | 2 | X | 6 |
| Great Britain (Dodds / Mouat) 🔨 | 0 | 0 | 1 | 0 | 0 | 1 | 0 | X | 2 |

=== Draw 13 ===
Monday, 7 February, 09:05

| Sheet A | 1 | 2 | 3 | 4 | 5 | 6 | 7 | 8 | Final |
| Switzerland (Perret / Rios) 🔨 | 0 | 0 | 1 | 0 | 2 | 0 | 2 | 0 | 5 |
| Norway (Skaslien / Nedregotten) | 1 | 1 | 0 | 1 | 0 | 2 | 0 | 1 | 6 |

| Sheet B | 1 | 2 | 3 | 4 | 5 | 6 | 7 | 8 | 9 | Final |
| Canada (Homan / Morris) | 0 | 2 | 0 | 0 | 2 | 0 | 3 | 0 | 0 | 7 |
| Italy (Constantini / Mosaner) 🔨 | 1 | 0 | 1 | 2 | 0 | 1 | 0 | 2 | 1 | 8 |

| Sheet C | 1 | 2 | 3 | 4 | 5 | 6 | 7 | 8 | Final |
| United States (Persinger / Plys) 🔨 | 0 | 1 | 0 | 0 | 2 | 1 | 0 | 0 | 4 |
| Great Britain (Dodds / Mouat) | 3 | 0 | 1 | 1 | 0 | 0 | 1 | 2 | 8 |

| Sheet D | 1 | 2 | 3 | 4 | 5 | 6 | 7 | 8 | Final |
| Czech Republic (Paulová / Paul) | 0 | 1 | 0 | 0 | 0 | 4 | 1 | 2 | 8 |
| China (Fan / Ling) 🔨 | 1 | 0 | 3 | 1 | 1 | 0 | 0 | 0 | 6 |

== Playoffs ==
Semifinals
1 | Italy | 8
4 | Sweden | 1
2 | Norway | 6
3 | Great Britain | 5

Gold medal game
1 | Italy | 8
2 | Norway | 5
Bronze medal game
4 | Sweden | 9
3 | Great Britain | 3

=== Semifinals ===
Monday, 7 February, 20:05

| Sheet C | 1 | 2 | 3 | 4 | 5 | 6 | 7 | 8 | Final |
| Italy (Constantini / Mosaner) 🔨 | 1 | 1 | 2 | 1 | 1 | 0 | 2 | X | 8 |
| Sweden (de Val / Eriksson) | 0 | 0 | 0 | 0 | 0 | 1 | 0 | X | 1 |

Player percentages
| Italy | | Sweden | |
|---|---|---|---|
| Stefania Constantini | 84% | Almida de Val | 52% |
| Amos Mosaner | 94% | Oskar Eriksson | 76% |
| Total | 90% | Total | 66% |

| Sheet A | 1 | 2 | 3 | 4 | 5 | 6 | 7 | 8 | Final |
| Norway (Skaslien / Nedregotten) 🔨 | 0 | 1 | 0 | 1 | 0 | 3 | 0 | 1 | 6 |
| Great Britain (Dodds / Mouat) | 1 | 0 | 2 | 0 | 1 | 0 | 1 | 0 | 5 |

Player percentages
| Norway | | Great Britain | |
|---|---|---|---|
| Kristin Skaslien | 81% | Jennifer Dodds | 83% |
| Magnus Nedregotten | 85% | Bruce Mouat | 81% |
| Total | 84% | Total | 82% |

=== Bronze medal game ===
Tuesday, 8 February, 14:05

| Sheet B | 1 | 2 | 3 | 4 | 5 | 6 | 7 | 8 | Final |
| Sweden (de Val / Eriksson) | 0 | 4 | 3 | 1 | 1 | 0 | X | X | 9 |
| Great Britain (Dodds / Mouat) 🔨 | 1 | 0 | 0 | 0 | 0 | 2 | X | X | 3 |

Player percentages
| Sweden | | Great Britain | |
|---|---|---|---|
| Almida de Val | 100% | Jennifer Dodds | 56% |
| Oskar Eriksson | 82% | Bruce Mouat | 85% |
| Total | 89% | Total | 73% |

=== Gold medal game ===
Tuesday, 8 February, 20:05

| Sheet B | 1 | 2 | 3 | 4 | 5 | 6 | 7 | 8 | Final |
| Italy (Constantini / Mosaner) 🔨 | 0 | 2 | 1 | 3 | 0 | 1 | 0 | 1 | 8 |
| Norway (Skaslien / Nedregotten) | 2 | 0 | 0 | 0 | 1 | 0 | 2 | 0 | 5 |

Player percentages
| Italy | | Norway | |
|---|---|---|---|
| Stefania Constantini | 83% | Kristin Skaslien | 70% |
| Amos Mosaner | 90% | Magnus Nedregotten | 69% |
| Total | 87% | Total | 69% |

== Final standings ==
The final standings are:

| Place | Team |
|---|---|
| 1st place, gold medalist(s) | Italy |
| 2nd place, silver medalist(s) | Norway |
| 3rd place, bronze medalist(s) | Sweden |
| 4 | Great Britain |
| 5 | Canada |
| 6 | Czech Republic |
| 7 | Switzerland |
| 8 | United States |
| 9 | China |
| 10 | Australia |

== Statistics ==
=== Player percentages ===
Percentages by draw.

==== Female ====
| # | Curler | 1 | 2 | 3 | 4 | 5 | 6 | 7 | 8 | 9 | Total |
|---|---|---|---|---|---|---|---|---|---|---|---|
| 1 | Stefania Constantini (ITA) | 72 | 82 | 75 | 91 | 84 | 80 | 85 | 67 | 85 | 79.7 |
| 2 | Kristin Skaslien (NOR) | 76 | 80 | 67 | 60 | 90 | 79 | 94 | 87 | 86 | 79.6 |
| 3 | Vicky Persinger (USA) | 70 | 77 | 61 | 81 | 77 | 71 | 86 | 80 | 67 | 74.5 |
| 4 | Zuzana Paulová (CZE) | 53 | 80 | 81 | 64 | 75 | 63 | 81 | 87 | 77 | 73.3 |
| 5 | Almida de Val (SWE) | 59 | 84 | 67 | 75 | 49 | 88 | 95 | 65 | 80 | 72.7 |
| 6 | Jennifer Dodds (GBR) | 61 | 78 | 78 | 72 | 59 | 75 | 73 | 63 | 88 | 72.1 |
| 7 | Rachel Homan (CAN) | 55 | 85 | 78 | 80 | 58 | 68 | 83 | 65 | 72 | 72.0 |
| 8 | Tahli Gill (AUS) | 70 | 69 | 70 | 69 | 65 | 56 | 73 | 77 | 71 | 69.1 |
| 9 | Fan Suyuan (CHN) | 75 | 75 | 72 | 73 | 63 | 68 | 63 | 55 | 60 | 67.3 |
| 10 | Jenny Perret (SUI) | 56 | 61 | 63 | 63 | 52 | 93 | 68 | 80 | 67 | 66.7 |

==== Male ====
| # | Curler | 1 | 2 | 3 | 4 | 5 | 6 | 7 | 8 | 9 | Total |
|---|---|---|---|---|---|---|---|---|---|---|---|
| 1 | Magnus Nedregotten (NOR) | 85 | 82 | 86 | 63 | 88 | 85 | 90 | 91 | 88 | 84.0 |
| 2 | Bruce Mouat (GBR) | 75 | 72 | 74 | 89 | 95 | 91 | 80 | 80 | 94 | 83.3 |
| 3 | John Morris (CAN) | 68 | 78 | 89 | 88 | 87 | 89 | 81 | 76 | 82 | 81.8 |
| 4 | Amos Mosaner (ITA) | 78 | 85 | 73 | 86 | 84 | 70 | 76 | 74 | 87 | 79.3 |
| 5 | Oskar Eriksson (SWE) | 57 | 76 | 86 | 84 | 78 | 89 | 86 | 72 | 78 | 78.2 |
| 6 | Ling Zhi (CHN) | 84 | 83 | 86 | 84 | 75 | 59 | 73 | 67 | 90 | 78.0 |
| 7 | Martin Rios (SUI) | 60 | 88 | 78 | 71 | 73 | 90 | 75 | 85 | 72 | 76.8 |
| 8 | Tomáš Paul (CZE) | 80 | 75 | 88 | 75 | 68 | 75 | 65 | 70 | 82 | 75.2 |
| 9 | Chris Plys (USA) | 73 | 55 | 75 | 76 | 81 | 76 | 79 | 81 | 72 | 74.3 |
| 10 | Dean Hewitt (AUS) | 75 | 78 | 54 | 75 | 78 | 60 | 83 | 76 | 81 | 74.1 |

==== Team total ====
| # | Team | 1 | 2 | 3 | 4 | 5 | 6 | 7 | 8 | 9 | Total |
|---|---|---|---|---|---|---|---|---|---|---|---|
| 1 | Norway | 82 | 81 | 79 | 62 | 88 | 83 | 91 | 89 | 87 | 82.3 |
| 2 | Italy | 76 | 84 | 74 | 88 | 84 | 74 | 79 | 71 | 86 | 79.4 |
| 3 | Great Britain | 69 | 74 | 76 | 82 | 81 | 85 | 78 | 74 | 91 | 78.9 |
| 4 | Canada | 63 | 81 | 84 | 85 | 77 | 81 | 82 | 72 | 78 | 77.9 |
| 5 | Sweden | 58 | 79 | 78 | 81 | 66 | 89 | 89 | 69 | 79 | 76.0 |
| 6 | Czech Republic | 69 | 77 | 85 | 71 | 71 | 70 | 71 | 77 | 80 | 74.5 |
| 7 | United States | 72 | 63 | 69 | 78 | 79 | 74 | 82 | 81 | 70 | 74.4 |
| 8 | China | 81 | 80 | 81 | 80 | 71 | 63 | 69 | 62 | 78 | 73.8 |
| 9 | Switzerland | 59 | 77 | 72 | 68 | 65 | 91 | 72 | 83 | 70 | 72.7 |
| 10 | Australia | 73 | 74 | 60 | 73 | 73 | 58 | 79 | 76 | 77 | 72.1 |
