= 2021 World Mixed Doubles Curling Championship =

- Host city: Aberdeen, Scotland
- Arena: Curl Aberdeen
- Dates: May 17–23, 2021
- Winner: Scotland
- Female: Jennifer Dodds
- Male: Bruce Mouat
- Coach: Greg Drummond
- Finalist: Norway (Skaslien / Nedregotten)

The 2021 World Mixed Doubles Curling Championship was held from May 17 to 23, 2021 in Aberdeen, Scotland.

Because of cancellations due to the COVID-19 pandemic, this was the first of two events for mixed doubles teams to qualify for the 2022 Olympics as part of the 2022 Winter Olympic Qualification process. The top seven National Olympic Committee teams from the championship qualified directly for the Olympics. China, as the host country for the Olympics, was already guaranteed an entry for a team selected by its national Olympic committee. The remaining two qualifying teams were determined at the 2021 Olympic Qualification Event, which was open to any nation that qualified for the 2020 or 2021 world mixed doubles championships (not already qualified for the Olympics) as well as the top three nations from the 2021 Pre-Olympic Qualification Event.

== Qualification ==
The following nations qualified to participate in the 2021 World Mixed Doubles Curling Championship: Pursuant to a December 2020 ruling by the Court of Arbitration for Sport due to the Russian doping scandal, Russia is prohibited from competing under its flag or any national symbols at any Olympic Games or world championships through 16 December 2022, and therefore the Russian team is competing neutrally representing the Russian Curling Federation (RCF).

Event	Vacancies	Qualified
2019 World Mixed Doubles Curling Championship	16	Sweden; Canada; United States; Australia; Czech Republic; Estonia; Japan; RCF; England; Spain; Finland; Hungary; Norway; New Zealand; Scotland; Switzerland
2019 World Mixed Doubles Qualification Event	4	Germany; Italy; South Korea; China
TOTAL	20	

=== World Ranking ===
The World Curling Federation World Ranking tracks and lists the success of all Member Associations.

Member Associations	Rank	Points
Canada	1	84.608
Switzerland	2	66.569
United States	3	47.721
Norway	4	46.814
China	5	46.152
RCF	6	39.118
South Korea	7	39.049
Sweden	8	34.422
Finland	9	32.230
Czech Republic	10	25.941
Japan	11	21.902
Scotland	12	21.029
Australia	13	19.069
Estonia	14	17.740
Hungary	15	17.451
England	17	11.559
Italy	18	11.490
Spain	19	9.578
New Zealand	21	7.113
Germany	28	5.191

== Teams ==
The teams are as follows:

Australia	Canada	China	Czech Republic
Female: Tahli Gill; Male: Dean Hewitt	Female: Kerri Einarson; Male: Brad Gushue	Female: Yang Ying; Male: Ling Zhi	Female: Zuzana Paulová; Male: Tomáš Paul
England	Estonia	Finland	Germany
Female: Anna Fowler; Male: Ben Fowler	Female: Marie Turmann; Male: Harri Lill	Female: Oona Kauste; Male: Aku Kauste	Female: Pia-Lisa Schöll; Male: Klaudius Harsch
Hungary	Italy	Japan	New Zealand
Female: Dorottya Palancsa; Male: Zsolt Kiss	Female: Stefania Constantini; Male: Amos Mosaner	Female: Yurika Yoshida; Male: Yuta Matsumura	Female: Courtney Smith; Male: Anton Hood
Norway	RCF	Scotland	South Korea
Female: Kristin Skaslien; Male: Magnus Nedregotten	Female: Anastasia Moskaleva; Male: Alexander Eremin	Female: Jennifer Dodds; Male: Bruce Mouat	Female: Kim Ji-yoon; Male: Moon Si-woo
Spain	Sweden	Switzerland	United States
Female: Oihane Otaegi; Male: Mikel Unanue	Female: Almida de Val; Male: Oskar Eriksson	Female: Jenny Perret; Male: Martin Rios	Female: Tabitha Peterson; Male: Joe Polo

== Round-robin standings ==
Final round-robin standings

Key
Teams to Playoffs (Top 3 in each group)
Teams to Olympic Qualification Round (4th place in each group)
Teams to Relegation Playoff (8th and 9th place in each group)
Teams relegated to 2021 Qualification Event (last place in each group)

Group A	W	L	W–L	DSC
Scotland	8	1	–	27.73
Canada	7	2	1–0	20.21
Italy	7	2	0–1	27.57
Czech Republic	5	4	1–0	24.20
Germany	5	4	0–1	43.99
RCF	4	5	–	35.43
Australia	3	6	1–1	40.04
Hungary	3	6	1–1	41.45
South Korea	3	6	1–1	70.65
Spain	0	9	–	40.83

Group B	W	L	W–L	DSC
Sweden	9	0	–	25.02
Norway	8	1	–	34.73
Switzerland	5	4	1–0	57.64
United States	5	4	0–1	36.73
China	4	5	1–0	26.01
New Zealand	4	5	0–1	38.26
England	3	6	1–0	46.68
Japan	3	6	0–1	30.54
Finland	2	7	1–0	34.45
Estonia	2	7	0–1	29.22

Group A Round Robin Summary Table
Pos.	Country	Australia	Canada	Denmark	Germany	Hungary	Italy		Scotland	South Korea	Spain	Record
7	Australia	—N/a	8–5	3–9	4–10	9–3	6–7	4–10	5–9	6–7	7–4	3–6
2	Canada	5–8	—	7–6	9–6	7–5	6–4	11–6	5–8	8–3	8–6	7–2
4	Czech Republic	9–3	6–7	—	5–4	6–7	4–5	5–2	5–7	7–5	7–3	5–4
5	Germany	10–4	6–9	4–5	—	8–5	6–9	7–1	5–7	9–3	9–2	5–4
8	Hungary	3–9	5–7	5–4	5–8	—	5–6	2–6	4–7	5–4	8–4	3–6
3	Italy	7–6	4–6	5–4	9–6	6–5	—	8–5	4–7	8–6	7–2	7–2
6	RCF	10–4	6–11	2–5	1–7	6–2	5–8	—	7–6	5–6	8–7	4–5
1	Scotland	9–5	8–5	7–5	7–5	7–4	7–4	6–7	—	9–1	9–1	8–1
9	South Korea	7–6	3–8	5–7	3–9	4–5	6–8	6–5	1–9	—	8–5	3–6
10	Spain	4–7	6–8	3–7	2–9	4–8	2–7	7–8	1–9	5–8	—	0–9

Group B Round Robin Summary Table
Pos.	Country	China	England	Estonia	Finland	Japan	New Zealand	Norway	Sweden	Switzerland	United States	Record
5	China	—	4–9	9–6	10–8	6–8	7–4	6–8	7–11	8–6	3–11	4–5
7	England	9–4	—	5–11	3–7	7–6	6–7	1–11	2–9	5–8	11–9	3–6
10	Estonia	6–9	11–5	—	6–8	10–3	6–7	1–7	6–9	5–8	5–6	2–7
9	Finland	8–10	7–3	8–6	—	3–8	4–6	4–8	4–8	5–8	7–9	2–7
8	Japan	8–6	6–7	3–10	8–3	—	2–7	5–11	5–11	9–6	6–7	3–6
6	New Zealand	4–7	7–6	7–6	6–4	7–2	—	1–10	1–8	3–5	5–6	4–5
2	Norway	8–6	11–1	7–1	8–4	11–5	10–1	—	5–10	9–5	8–7	8–1
1	Sweden	11–7	9–2	9–6	8–4	11–5	8–1	10–5	—	8–5	7–5	9–0
3	Switzerland	6–8	8–5	8–5	8–5	6–9	5–3	5–9	5–8	—	8–3	5–4
4	United States	11–3	9–11	6–5	9–7	7–6	6–5	7–8	5–7	3–8	—	5–4

== Round-robin results ==
All draw times are listed in British Summer Time (UTC+01:00).

=== Draw 1 ===
Monday, May 17, 5:30 pm

Sheet A	1	2	3	4	5	6	7	8	Final
Czech Republic 🔨	0	3	1	1	0	2	2	X	9
Australia	1	0	0	0	2	0	0	X	3

Sheet B	1	2	3	4	5	6	7	8	Final
Canada 🔨	0	0	2	0	3	0	1	2	8
Spain	3	1	0	1	0	1	0	0	6

Sheet C	1	2	3	4	5	6	7	8	Final
Germany 🔨	0	0	3	0	3	1	0	1	8
Hungary	2	1	0	1	0	0	1	0	5

Sheet D	1	2	3	4	5	6	7	8	Final
Italy	1	0	0	0	2	0	1	X	4
Scotland 🔨	0	2	2	1	0	2	0	X	7

Sheet E	1	2	3	4	5	6	7	8	9	Final
RCF 🔨	0	1	0	3	0	0	0	1	0	5
South Korea	1	0	1	0	1	1	1	0	1	6

=== Draw 2 ===
Monday, May 17, 9:00 pm

Sheet A	1	2	3	4	5	6	7	8	Final
United States 🔨	3	1	2	0	4	1	X	X	11
China	0	0	0	3	0	0	X	X	3

Sheet B	1	2	3	4	5	6	7	8	Final
Norway	0	3	3	1	1	2	X	X	10
New Zealand 🔨	1	0	0	0	0	0	X	X	1

Sheet C	1	2	3	4	5	6	7	8	Final
Finland 🔨	1	0	0	1	0	0	2	X	4
Sweden	0	2	3	0	2	1	0	X	8

Sheet D	1	2	3	4	5	6	7	8	Final
England	0	2	0	1	1	0	1	0	5
Switzerland 🔨	2	0	2	0	0	2	0	2	8

Sheet E	1	2	3	4	5	6	7	8	Final
Japan	0	0	0	0	3	0	0	X	3
Estonia 🔨	1	1	2	2	0	2	2	X	10

=== Draw 3 ===
Tuesday, May 18, 9:00 am

Sheet A	1	2	3	4	5	6	7	8	Final
Spain	1	0	1	0	0	0	0	X	2
Italy 🔨	0	2	0	1	2	1	1	X	7

Sheet B	1	2	3	4	5	6	7	8	Final
Australia 🔨	0	0	0	3	0	2	0	X	5
Scotland	1	3	2	0	2	0	1	X	9

Sheet C	1	2	3	4	5	6	7	8	Final
RCF 🔨	0	0	0	0	0	1	1	X	2
Czech Republic	1	1	1	1	1	0	0	X	5

Sheet D	1	2	3	4	5	6	7	8	Final
South Korea	2	1	0	0	0	0	1	0	4
Hungary 🔨	0	0	1	1	1	1	0	1	5

Sheet E	1	2	3	4	5	6	7	8	Final
Canada 🔨	2	0	3	0	0	2	2	X	9
Germany	0	1	0	2	3	0	0	X	6

=== Draw 4 ===
Tuesday, May 18, 12:30 pm

Sheet A	1	2	3	4	5	6	7	8	9	Final
New Zealand 🔨	0	0	4	0	1	0	1	0	1	7
England	1	1	0	1	0	1	0	2	0	6

Sheet B	1	2	3	4	5	6	7	8	9	Final
China 🔨	0	2	0	1	0	1	1	1	2	8
Switzerland	1	0	2	0	3	0	0	0	0	6

Sheet C	1	2	3	4	5	6	7	8	Final
Japan	0	3	0	1	0	2	0	0	6
United States 🔨	1	0	1	0	2	0	2	1	7

Sheet D	1	2	3	4	5	6	7	8	Final
Estonia 🔨	0	1	1	0	2	0	2	X	6
Sweden	3	0	0	1	0	5	0	X	9

Sheet E	1	2	3	4	5	6	7	8	Final
Norway	1	2	1	0	2	0	2	X	8
Finland 🔨	0	0	0	2	0	2	0	X	4

=== Draw 5 ===
Tuesday, May 18, 4:00 pm

Sheet A	1	2	3	4	5	6	7	8	Final
Hungary	0	2	0	0	1	0	2	X	5
Canada 🔨	2	0	2	1	0	2	0	X	7

Sheet B	1	2	3	4	5	6	7	8	Final
Czech Republic 🔨	1	2	1	0	0	1	0	2	7
South Korea	0	0	0	1	3	0	1	0	5

Sheet C	1	2	3	4	5	6	7	8	Final
Australia	0	3	0	0	2	0	1	0	6
Italy 🔨	1	0	1	1	0	3	0	1	7

Sheet D	1	2	3	4	5	6	7	8	Final
Germany 🔨	1	1	0	3	1	1	X	X	7
RCF	0	0	1	0	0	0	X	X	1

Sheet E	1	2	3	4	5	6	7	8	Final
Spain	0	0	0	0	1	0	X	X	1
Scotland 🔨	2	2	1	2	0	2	X	X	9

=== Draw 6 ===
Tuesday, May 18, 7:30 pm

Sheet A	1	2	3	4	5	6	7	8	Final
Sweden 🔨	3	0	1	0	2	0	1	3	10
Norway	0	1	0	1	0	3	0	0	5

Sheet B	1	2	3	4	5	6	7	8	Final
United States 🔨	1	0	0	0	1	2	0	2	6
Estonia	0	2	1	1	0	0	1	0	5

Sheet C	1	2	3	4	5	6	7	8	Final
China 🔨	1	1	0	0	0	2	0	0	4
England	0	0	1	2	2	0	1	3	9

Sheet D	1	2	3	4	5	6	7	8	Final
Finland	0	0	0	2	0	1	0	X	3
Japan 🔨	1	3	1	0	1	0	2	X	8

Sheet E	1	2	3	4	5	6	7	8	Final
New Zealand	1	0	1	0	0	0	1	X	3
Switzerland 🔨	0	1	0	1	1	2	0	X	5

=== Draw 7 ===
Wednesday, May 19, 9:00 am

Sheet A	1	2	3	4	5	6	7	8	Final
Scotland 🔨	2	0	1	0	0	3	0	0	6
RCF	0	2	0	1	1	0	1	2	7

Sheet B	1	2	3	4	5	6	7	8	Final
Germany 🔨	3	0	1	0	0	2	0	0	6
Italy	0	2	0	3	2	0	1	1	9

Sheet C	1	2	3	4	5	6	7	8	Final
South Korea 🔨	3	0	1	0	2	1	1	X	8
Spain	0	4	0	1	0	0	0	X	5

Sheet D	1	2	3	4	5	6	7	8	Final
Hungary	2	0	2	0	0	2	0	1	7
Czech Republic 🔨	0	1	0	2	1	0	2	0	6

Sheet E	1	2	3	4	5	6	7	8	Final
Australia	0	2	0	2	0	2	1	1	8
Canada 🔨	2	0	2	0	1	0	0	0	5

=== Draw 8 ===
Wednesday, May 19, 12:30 pm

Sheet A	1	2	3	4	5	6	7	8	Final
Switzerland	0	2	0	3	0	1	0	X	6
Japan 🔨	1	0	3	0	3	0	2	X	9

Sheet B	1	2	3	4	5	6	7	8	Final
Finland 🔨	2	0	1	1	2	0	1	X	7
England	0	2	0	0	0	1	0	X	3

Sheet C	1	2	3	4	5	6	7	8	Final
Estonia	2	1	0	2	0	0	0	1	6
New Zealand 🔨	0	0	4	0	1	1	1	0	7

Sheet D	1	2	3	4	5	6	7	8	Final
Sweden	0	2	0	3	0	2	0	X	7
United States 🔨	2	0	1	0	1	0	1	X	5

Sheet E	1	2	3	4	5	6	7	8	Final
China	0	0	1	0	3	0	2	0	6
Norway 🔨	2	1	0	2	0	2	0	1	8

=== Draw 9 ===
Wednesday, May 19, 4:00 pm

Sheet A	1	2	3	4	5	6	7	8	Final
Germany 🔨	3	3	1	0	1	0	1	X	9
Spain	0	0	0	1	0	1	0	X	2

Sheet B	1	2	3	4	5	6	7	8	Final
RCF 🔨	1	0	5	2	0	1	1	X	10
Australia	0	3	0	0	1	0	0	X	4

Sheet C	1	2	3	4	5	6	7	8	Final
Czech Republic	0	0	1	1	0	2	0	1	5
Scotland 🔨	1	4	0	0	1	0	1	0	7

Sheet D	1	2	3	4	5	6	7	8	Final
Canada 🔨	2	1	1	0	0	3	1	X	8
South Korea	0	0	0	2	1	0	0	X	3

Sheet E	1	2	3	4	5	6	7	8	Final
Italy	1	0	0	3	0	1	0	1	6
Hungary 🔨	0	1	1	0	1	0	2	0	5

=== Draw 10 ===
Wednesday, May 19, 7:30 pm

Sheet A	1	2	3	4	5	6	7	8	Final
Finland	0	0	1	0	1	2	0	X	4
New Zealand 🔨	1	2	0	1	0	0	2	X	6

Sheet B	1	2	3	4	5	6	7	8	Final
Japan	0	3	0	3	1	1	0	X	8
China 🔨	1	0	2	0	0	0	3	X	6

Sheet C	1	2	3	4	5	6	7	8	Final
United States	0	1	0	1	0	1	0	X	3
Switzerland 🔨	1	0	1	0	4	0	2	X	8

Sheet D	1	2	3	4	5	6	7	8	Final
Norway 🔨	3	1	1	1	1	0	X	X	7
Estonia	0	0	0	0	0	1	X	X	1

Sheet E	1	2	3	4	5	6	7	8	Final
England	0	1	0	1	0	0	X	X	2
Sweden 🔨	1	0	2	0	4	2	X	X	9

=== Draw 11 ===
Thursday, May 20, 9:00 am

Sheet A	1	2	3	4	5	6	7	8	Final
Japan 🔨	0	1	0	1	0	3	0	X	5
Sweden	3	0	2	0	2	0	4	X	11

Sheet B	1	2	3	4	5	6	7	8	Final
New Zealand 🔨	0	1	0	1	1	0	1	1	5
United States	2	0	3	0	0	1	0	0	6

Sheet C	1	2	3	4	5	6	7	8	Final
England	0	0	1	0	0	0	X	X	1
Norway 🔨	1	2	0	4	1	3	X	X	11

Sheet D	1	2	3	4	5	6	7	8	Final
Switzerland	1	1	0	3	0	2	0	1	8
Finland 🔨	0	0	2	0	1	0	2	0	5

Sheet E	1	2	3	4	5	6	7	8	Final
Estonia	0	0	0	4	0	2	0	0	6
China 🔨	2	1	1	0	1	0	3	1	9

=== Draw 12 ===
Thursday, May 20, 12:30 pm

Sheet A	1	2	3	4	5	6	7	8	Final
RCF 🔨	1	2	1	1	0	1	0	X	6
Hungary	0	0	0	0	1	0	1	X	2

Sheet B	1	2	3	4	5	6	7	8	Final
Spain	0	0	0	1	0	2	0	X	3
Czech Republic 🔨	1	1	2	0	2	0	1	X	7

Sheet C	1	2	3	4	5	6	7	8	Final
Italy	0	1	1	1	0	0	1	0	4
Canada 🔨	1	0	0	0	2	1	0	2	6

Sheet D	1	2	3	4	5	6	7	8	Final
Scotland 🔨	1	0	3	0	1	1	0	1	7
Germany	0	1	0	3	0	0	1	0	5

Sheet E	1	2	3	4	5	6	7	8	Final
South Korea	2	1	0	3	0	1	0	0	7
Australia 🔨	0	0	1	0	1	0	3	1	6

=== Draw 13 ===
Thursday, May 20, 4:00 pm

Sheet A	1	2	3	4	5	6	7	8	Final
Norway 🔨	2	0	1	0	2	0	2	2	9
Switzerland	0	2	0	1	0	2	0	0	5

Sheet B	1	2	3	4	5	6	7	8	Final
Estonia 🔨	0	2	0	1	1	0	2	0	6
Finland	1	0	2	0	0	4	0	1	8

Sheet C	1	2	3	4	5	6	7	8	Final
Sweden 🔨	3	0	3	0	2	0	3	X	11
China	0	1	0	3	0	3	0	X	7

Sheet D	1	2	3	4	5	6	7	8	Final
Japan 🔨	0	0	0	1	1	0	0	X	2
New Zealand	1	2	1	0	0	2	1	X	7

Sheet E	1	2	3	4	5	6	7	8	9	Final
United States	0	3	0	2	0	3	1	0	0	9
England 🔨	3	0	2	0	2	0	0	2	2	11

=== Draw 14 ===
Thursday, May 20, 7:30 pm

Sheet A	1	2	3	4	5	6	7	8	Final
Canada	0	0	2	0	3	0	0	X	5
Scotland 🔨	3	1	0	2	0	1	1	X	8

Sheet B	1	2	3	4	5	6	7	8	Final
South Korea 🔨	0	0	0	1	0	2	0	X	3
Germany	3	1	3	0	1	0	1	X	9

Sheet C	1	2	3	4	5	6	7	8	Final
Hungary	2	0	0	0	1	0	X	X	3
Australia 🔨	0	3	1	1	0	4	X	X	9

Sheet D	1	2	3	4	5	6	7	8	Final
RCF 🔨	2	1	0	1	0	0	0	4	8
Spain	0	0	3	0	2	1	1	0	7

Sheet E	1	2	3	4	5	6	7	8	Final
Czech Republic 🔨	0	0	1	1	0	1	1	0	4
Italy	2	1	0	0	1	0	0	1	5

=== Draw 15 ===
Friday, May 21, 9:00 am

Sheet A	1	2	3	4	5	6	7	8	Final
China 🔨	0	4	0	0	4	0	2	0	10
Finland	2	0	3	1	0	1	0	1	8

Sheet B	1	2	3	4	5	6	7	8	Final
England 🔨	1	1	0	2	0	1	0	2	7
Japan	0	0	1	0	2	0	3	0	6

Sheet C	1	2	3	4	5	6	7	8	Final
Switzerland	1	0	1	0	2	0	4	X	8
Estonia 🔨	0	1	0	3	0	1	0	X	5

Sheet D	1	2	3	4	5	6	7	8	Final
United States 🔨	1	0	5	0	0	0	1	0	7
Norway	0	1	0	3	1	2	0	1	8

Sheet E	1	2	3	4	5	6	7	8	Final
Sweden 🔨	1	2	1	3	1	0	X	X	8
New Zealand	0	0	0	0	0	1	X	X	1

=== Draw 16 ===
Friday, May 21, 12:30 pm

Sheet A	1	2	3	4	5	6	7	8	Final
Australia 🔨	1	0	1	1	1	0	0	0	4
Germany	0	2	0	0	0	3	3	2	10

Sheet B	1	2	3	4	5	6	7	8	Final
Italy	0	4	1	0	1	0	2	X	8
RCF 🔨	2	0	0	2	0	1	0	X	5

Sheet C	1	2	3	4	5	6	7	8	Final
Scotland 🔨	3	1	3	0	1	1	X	X	9
South Korea	0	0	0	1	0	0	X	X	1

Sheet D	1	2	3	4	5	6	7	8	Final
Czech Republic 🔨	0	0	1	0	4	0	1	0	6
Canada	1	1	0	2	0	2	0	1	7

Sheet E	1	2	3	4	5	6	7	8	Final
Hungary 🔨	2	2	0	3	0	1	0	X	8
Spain	0	0	1	0	2	0	1	X	4

=== Draw 17 ===
Friday, May 21, 4:00 pm

Sheet A	1	2	3	4	5	6	7	8	Final
England	0	2	0	1	0	2	0	X	5
Estonia 🔨	3	0	2	0	2	0	4	X	11

Sheet B	1	2	3	4	5	6	7	8	Final
Switzerland	0	1	0	0	2	0	2	X	5
Sweden 🔨	1	0	3	3	0	1	0	X	8

Sheet C	1	2	3	4	5	6	7	8	Final
Norway	0	4	0	1	0	2	4	X	11
Japan 🔨	2	0	1	0	2	0	0	X	5

Sheet D	1	2	3	4	5	6	7	8	Final
New Zealand	0	1	0	1	0	1	1	0	4
China 🔨	2	0	2	0	2	0	0	1	7

Sheet E	1	2	3	4	5	6	7	8	Final
Finland 🔨	4	1	0	0	1	0	1	0	7
United States	0	0	3	1	0	3	0	2	9

=== Draw 18 ===
Friday, May 21, 7:30 pm

Sheet A	1	2	3	4	5	6	7	8	Final
Italy 🔨	2	0	1	4	0	0	1	X	8
South Korea	0	2	0	0	1	1	0	X	4

Sheet B	1	2	3	4	5	6	7	8	Final
Scotland 🔨	2	0	1	0	2	0	2	X	7
Hungary	0	1	0	2	0	1	0	X	4

Sheet C	1	2	3	4	5	6	7	8	Final
Canada 🔨	4	0	2	0	0	1	0	4	11
RCF	0	2	0	1	1	0	2	0	6

Sheet D	1	2	3	4	5	6	7	8	Final
Spain	0	1	0	1	0	1	1	X	4
Australia 🔨	1	0	4	0	2	0	0	X	7

Sheet E	1	2	3	4	5	6	7	8	Final
Germany	0	0	1	0	2	0	1	0	4
Czech Republic 🔨	1	1	0	1	0	1	0	1	5

== Relegation playoff ==
Saturday, May 22, 10:00 am

Sheet A	1	2	3	4	5	6	7	8	Final
Hungary 🔨	2	1	0	1	1	0	5	X	10
Finland	0	0	3	0	0	1	0	X	4

Player percentages
Hungary		Finland	
Dorottya Palancsa	93%	Oona Kauste	86%
Zsolt Kiss	85%	Aku Kauste	64%
Total	88%	Total	73%

Sheet E	1	2	3	4	5	6	7	8	Final
Japan	0	1	0	2	0	3	0	1	7
South Korea 🔨	1	0	1	0	1	0	2	0	5

Player percentages
Japan		South Korea	
Yurika Yoshida	83%	Kim Ji-yoon	80%
Yuta Matsumura	84%	Moon Si-woo	80%
Total	83%	Total	80%

== Olympic Qualification Round ==
Saturday, May 22, 4:00 pm

Sheet E	1	2	3	4	5	6	7	8	Final
Czech Republic 🔨	3	2	0	0	0	1	0	2	8
United States	0	0	2	1	1	0	2	0	6

Player percentages
Czech Republic		United States	
Zuzana Paulová	85%	Tabitha Peterson	73%
Tomáš Paul	84%	Joe Polo	66%
Total	85%	Total	70%

== Playoffs ==
Qualification games
A2	Canada	7
B3	Switzerland	6
B2	Norway	7
A3	Italy	5

Semifinals
A1	Scotland	7
A2	Canada	4
B1	Sweden	6
B2	Norway	7

Final
A1	Scotland	9
B2	Norway	7
Bronze medal game
A2	Canada	4
B1	Sweden	7

=== Qualification Games ===
Saturday, May 22, 10:00 am

Sheet B	1	2	3	4	5	6	7	8	9	Final
Canada 🔨	1	0	0	0	3	1	0	1	1	7
Switzerland	0	1	3	1	0	0	1	0	0	6

Player percentages
Canada		Switzerland	
Kerri Einarson	74%	Jenny Perret	67%
Brad Gushue	85%	Martin Rios	74%
Total	81%	Total	71%

Sheet D	1	2	3	4	5	6	7	8	Final
Norway 🔨	1	1	0	1	2	0	2	0	7
Italy	0	0	1	0	0	3	0	1	5

Player percentages
Norway		Italy	
Kristin Skaslien	88%	Stefania Constantini	72%
Magnus Nedregotten	84%	Amos Mosaner	73%
Total	86%	Total	72%

=== Semifinal 1 ===
Saturday, May 22, 4:00 pm

Sheet C	1	2	3	4	5	6	7	8	Final
Sweden 🔨	1	0	3	0	0	2	0	0	6
Norway	0	1	0	2	1	0	2	1	7

Player percentages
Sweden		Norway	
Almida de Val	67%	Kristin Skaslien	73%
Oskar Eriksson	79%	Magnus Nedregotten	78%
Total	74%	Total	76%

=== Semifinal 2 ===
Saturday, May 22, 7:30 pm

Sheet C	1	2	3	4	5	6	7	8	Final
Scotland 🔨	1	0	3	0	1	0	1	1	7
Canada	0	1	0	1	0	2	0	0	4

Player percentages
Scotland		Canada	
Jennifer Dodds	86%	Kerri Einarson	69%
Bruce Mouat	85%	Brad Gushue	71%
Total	86%	Total	70%

=== Bronze medal game ===
Sunday, May 23, 10:00 am

Sheet C	1	2	3	4	5	6	7	8	Final
Canada	0	1	1	0	1	0	1	X	4
Sweden 🔨	4	0	0	2	0	1	0	X	7

Player percentages
Canada		Sweden	
Kerri Einarson	57%	Almida de Val	98%
Brad Gushue	82%	Oskar Eriksson	88%
Total	72%	Total	91%

=== Final ===
Sunday, May 23, 3:00 pm

Sheet C	1	2	3	4	5	6	7	8	Final
Scotland 🔨	2	0	1	0	2	0	3	1	9
Norway	0	3	0	2	0	2	0	0	7

Player percentages
Scotland		Norway	
Jennifer Dodds	72%	Kristin Skaslien	80%
Bruce Mouat	83%	Magnus Nedregotten	83%
Total	79%	Total	82%

== Statistics ==
=== Top 5 player percentages ===
Final Round Robin Percentages

Female	%
(Sweden) Almida de Val	87.6
(Scotland) Jennifer Dodds	80.7
(Switzerland) Jenny Perret	78.8
(Norway) Kristin Skaslien	78.5
(United States) Tabitha Peterson	75.5

Male	%
(Sweden) Oskar Eriksson	87.8
(Norway) Magnus Nedregotten	85.8
(Scotland) Bruce Mouat	84.9
(Italy) Amos Mosaner	81.4
(Canada) Brad Gushue	80.8

== Final standings ==
Key
Teams qualified for 2022 Winter Olympics
Teams relegated to World Mixed Doubles Qualification Event

Place	Team
1st place, gold medalist(s)	Scotland
2nd place, silver medalist(s)	Norway
3rd place, bronze medalist(s)	Sweden
4	Canada
5	Italy
5	Switzerland
7	Czech Republic
8	United States
9	China
10	Germany

Place	Team
11	RCF
12	New Zealand
13	Australia
14	England
15	Hungary
15	Japan
17	Finland
17	South Korea
19	Estonia
20	Spain
