= Ling Zhi =

Chinese curler

Ling Zhi 凌智
- Curler
- Born: April 6, 1994 (age 32); Harbin, China

Team
- Curling club: Harbin CC, Harbin, CHN
- Mixed doubles partner: Fan Suyuan

Curling career
- Member Association: China
- World Mixed Doubles Championship: 1 (2021)
- Olympic: 1 (2022)

Ling Zhi (Chinese: 凌智; pinyin: Líng Zhì; born April 6, 1994) is a Chinese curler from Harbin.

== Career ==
Ling represented China at the 2014 World Junior Curling Championships, where his team finished in last place with a winless 0–9 record. In 2013 and 2014, he won back-to-back Pacific-Asia Junior Curling Championships.

Ling represented China internationally at the men's level at the third leg of the Curling World Cup event. He played third on Team Ma Xiuyue, which finished with a 1–5 record.

In mixed play, Ling competed at the 2017 World Mixed Curling Championship as third for Liu Sijia. The team reached the round of 16, where the Czech Republic eliminated them.

Ling played mixed doubles with partner Yang Ying but now plays with Fan Suyuan. At the 2019 World Mixed Doubles Qualification Event, Yang and Ling teamed up to secure China a spot in the 2020 World Mixed Doubles Curling Championship, defeating Turkey in the qualification final. The 2020 World Championship, however, was cancelled due to the COVID-19 pandemic. Yang and Ling did get a chance to represent China at the 2021 World Mixed Doubles Curling Championship, where they finished in ninth place with a 4–5 record.

On February 7, 2022, in the 13th round of the curling mixed doubles round-robin competition at the Beijing Winter Olympics, the Chinese team Ling Zhi/Fan Suyuan lost 6-8 to Czech players Tomáš Paul/Suzanne Paulova, who suffered 7 consecutive games. In the end, Ling Zhi/Fan Suyuan ended the Winter Olympics with 9th place.

== Teams ==
=== Men's ===
Season	Skip	Third	Second	Lead	Alternate
2012–13	Zou Qiang	Shao Zhilin	Zhang Tianyu	Liang Shuming	Ling Zhi
2013–14	Wang Jinbo	Ling Zhi	Zhang Tianyu	Shao Zhilin	Liang Shuming
2018–19	Ma Xiuyue	Jiang Dongxu	Ling Zhi	Wang Jingyuan	

=== Mixed doubles ===
Season	Female	Male	Coach	Events
2019–20	Yang Ying	Ling Zhi	Tomi Rantamäki	WMDQ 2019 (bronze)
2020–21	Yang Ying	Ling Zhi	Tomi Rantamäki	WMDCC 2021 (9th)
2021–22	Fan Suyuan	Ling Zhi	Tomi Rantamäki	WOG 2022 (9th)
