= Jennifer Dodds =

Scottish curler (born 1991)

Jennifer Dodds MBE
- Curler
- Born: 1 October 1991 (age 35); Edinburgh, Scotland

Team
- Curling club: Carrington CC
- Mixed doubles partner: Orrin Carson

Curling career
- Member Association: Scotland; Great Britain
- World Championship: 5 (2018, 2021, 2023, 2024, 2025)
- World Mixed Doubles Championship: 3 (2021, 2023, 2025)
- European Championship: 6 (2018, 2019, 2021, 2023, 2024, 2025)
- Olympic: 2 (2022, 2026)
Medal record
Women's curling
Representing Great Britain
Olympic Games
| Gold medal – first place | 2022 Beijing |
Representing Scotland
World Mixed Doubles Championship
| Gold medal – first place | 2021 Aberdeen |
| Silver medal – second place | 2025 Fredericton |
European Curling Championships
| Gold medal – first place | 2021 Lillehammer |
| Silver medal – second place | 2019 Helsingborg |
| Silver medal – second place | 2025 Lohja |
| Bronze medal – third place | 2024 Lohja |
World Junior Curling Championships
| Silver medal – second place | 2013 Sochi |
Scottish Women's Championship
| Gold medal – first place | 2018 Perth |
| Gold medal – first place | 2020 Perth |
| Silver medal – second place | 2014 Perth |
| Silver medal – second place | 2016 Perth |
| Silver medal – second place | 2017 Perth |
| Silver medal – second place | 2019 Perth |
| Silver medal – second place | 2024 Dumfries |
| Silver medal – second place | 2025 Dumfries |
Scottish Mixed Doubles Championship
| Gold medal – first place | 2020 Perth |
| Gold medal – first place | 2023 Perth |
| Silver medal – second place | 2022 Perth |
| Bronze medal – third place | 2026 Aberdeen |

Jennifer Carmichael Dodds (born 1 October 1991) is a Scottish curler. She is the 2022 Olympic champion in women's curling and the 2021 World champion in mixed doubles curling.

== Career ==
Dodds played second for the Hannah Fleming junior rink that won a silver medal at the 2013 World Junior Curling Championships. While attending Edinburgh College, Dodds played on Fleming's team at the 2013 Winter Universiade, placing fourth.

Dodds left the Fleming rink in 2014, playing third for Lauren Gray for two seasons. The team won the 2015 Dumfries Challenger Series event on the World Curling Tour. In 2016, she returned to the Fleming rink as her third. The team won the 2018 Scottish Women's Curling Championship and defeated the Eve Muirhead Olympic team for the right to represent Scotland at the 2018 World Women's Curling Championship. There, the team missed the playoffs with a 5–7 record.

For the 2018–19 season, Dodds joined the Muirhead rink as third. At the first leg of the 2018–19 Curling World Cup, Dodds skipped the team due to Muirhead having a hip injury. They finished in sixth with a 2–4 record. She played in her first European Curling Championships at the 2018 European Curling Championships. The team had a disappointing performance, finishing with a 4–5 record and missing the playoffs. At the 2019 Scottish Women's Curling Championships, the team qualified for the final but lost to Sophie Jackson 11–7. In Grand Slam play, the team qualified for the playoffs in two of their three events with their best finish being at the Canadian Open where they lost in the semi-final.

Team Muirhead began the 2019–20 season by winning the 2019 Cameron's Brewing Oakville Fall Classic. At the 2019 European Curling Championships, the Muirhead rink reached the final where they lost to Sweden's Anna Hasselborg, claiming the silver medal. In early January, they won the Mercure Perth Masters. Team Muirhead claimed the 2020 Scottish Women's Curling Championship by defeating Maggie Wilson 8–3 in the championship game. The team was set to represent Scotland at the 2020 World Women's Curling Championship before the event was cancelled due to the COVID-19 pandemic. In Grand Slam play, they played in three events and qualified in one of them, the 2019 National where they lost in the quarterfinals to Jennifer Jones.

Due to the ongoing pandemic, a limited number of tour events were held during the 2020–21 season. Team Muirhead did play in a series of domestic events put on by the British Curling Association, where they won the January Challenge event and finished runner-up to Team Gina Aitken in the Elite Finals. Dodds and her mixed doubles partner Bruce Mouat also won both mixed doubles events hosted by British Curling, which qualified to represent Scotland at the 2021 World Mixed Doubles Curling Championship. A "curling bubble" was set up in Calgary, Canada in the spring, which hosted a number of events, including the 2021 World Women's Curling Championship and two slams. Team Muirhead competed in both the 2021 Champions Cup and the 2021 Players' Championship, failing to qualify at both events. The next week, the team represented Scotland at the World's, finishing with a disappointing 6–7 record, in eighth place. Right after the World Championship, Dodds travelled back home to Aberdeen, Scotland to compete in the World Mixed Doubles with Mouat. The pair had a strong showing, finishing the round robin with an 8–1 record, earning them a direct bye to the semi-finals. They then defeated Canada 7–4 in the semi-final and topped Norway 9–7 to claim the gold medal.

Dodds was appointed Member of the Order of the British Empire (MBE) in the 2022 Birthday Honours for services to curling.

== Personal life ==
Before becoming a full-time curler, Dodds worked as an office assistant. Her cousin Abigail Brown won the 2012 World Junior championships.

== Teams ==
| Season | Skip | Third | Second | Lead | Alternate |
|---|---|---|---|---|---|
| 2011–12 | Jennifer Dodds | Rebecca Kesley | Mhairi Baird | Vicky Wright | |
| 2012–13 | Hannah Fleming | Lauren Gray | Jennifer Dodds | Abigail Brown | Vicky Wright |
| 2013–14 | Hannah Fleming | Lauren Gray | Jennifer Dodds | Alice Spence | |
| 2014–15 | Lauren Gray | Jennifer Dodds | Vicky Wright | Mhairi Baird | |
| 2015–16 | Lauren Gray | Jennifer Dodds | Vicky Wright | Mhairi Baird | |
| 2016–17 | Hannah Fleming | Jennifer Dodds | Alice Spence | Vicky Wright | |
| 2017–18 | Hannah Fleming | Jennifer Dodds | Alice Spence | Vicky Wright | Sophie Jackson |
| 2018–19 | Eve Muirhead | Jennifer Dodds | Vicki Chalmers | Lauren Gray | Vicky Wright |
| 2019–20 | Eve Muirhead | Lauren Gray | Jennifer Dodds | Vicky Wright | |
| 2020–21 | Eve Muirhead | Vicky Wright | Jennifer Dodds | Lauren Gray | Sophie Sinclair |
| 2021–22 | Eve Muirhead | Vicky Wright | Jennifer Dodds | Hailey Duff | Mili Smith |
| 2022–23 | Rebecca Morrison | Gina Aitken | Sophie Sinclair | Sophie Jackson | Jennifer Dodds |
| 2023–24 | Rebecca Morrison | Jennifer Dodds | Sophie Sinclair | Sophie Jackson | Gina Aitken |
| 2024–25 | Rebecca Morrison (Fourth) | Jennifer Dodds | Sophie Sinclair | Sophie Jackson (Skip) | Fay Henderson |
| 2025–26 | Rebecca Morrison (Fourth) | Jennifer Dodds | Sophie Sinclair | Sophie Jackson (Skip) | Fay Henderson |
