= Stefania Constantini =

Italian curler (born 1999)

- Curler
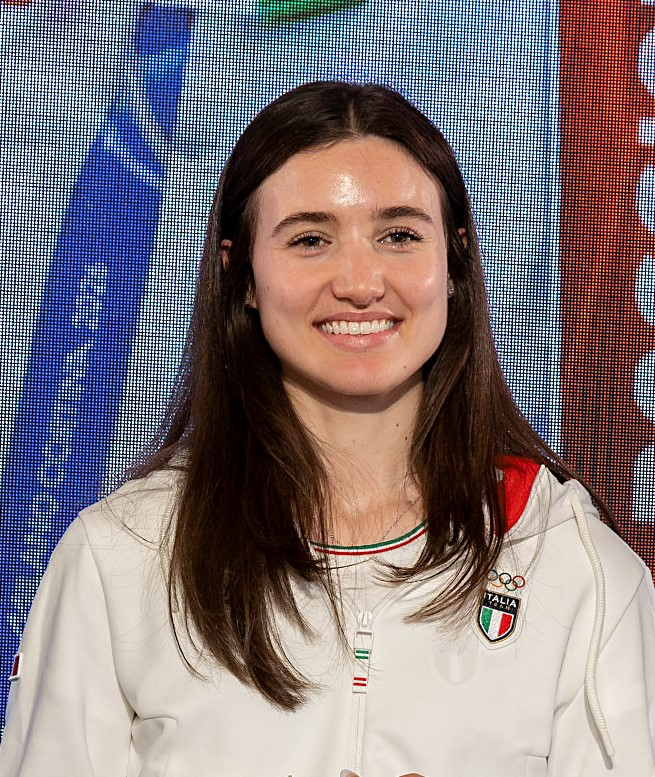
- Constantini in 2026
- Born: 15 April 1999 (age 27); Pieve di Cadore, Italy

Team
- Curling club: CC Dolomiti, Cortina d'Ampezzo, ITA
- Skip: Stefania Constantini
- Third: Lucrezia Grande
- Second: Angela Romei
- Lead: Allegra Grande
- Mixed doubles partner: Amos Mosaner

Curling career
- Member Association: Italy
- World Championship: 7 (2018, 2021, 2022, 2023, 2024, 2025, 2026)
- World Mixed Doubles Championship: 6 (2021, 2022, 2023, 2024, 2025, 2026)
- European Championship: 8 (2017, 2018, 2019, 2021, 2022, 2023, 2024, 2025)
- Olympic: 2 (2022, 2026)
Medal record
Women's curling
Representing Italy
Olympic Games
Gold medal – first place	2022 Beijing	Mixed doubles
Bronze medal – third place	2026 Milano Cortina	Mixed doubles
World Mixed Doubles Championship
Gold medal – first place	2025 Fredericton
European Championships
Silver medal – second place	2023 Aberdeen
Bronze medal – third place	2017 St Gallen

Stefania Constantini (born 15 April 1999) is an Italian curler from Cortina d'Ampezzo. She has competed in seven World Women's Championships, six World Mixed Doubles Championships and eight European Championships. She currently skips her own team and plays mixed doubles with Amos Mosaner. She won a silver medal at the 2023 European Curling Championships, a bronze medal at the 2017 European Curling Championships, a gold medal in mixed doubles at the 2022 Beijing Olympics, and a bronze medal in mixed doubles at the 2026 Winter Olympics.

== Career ==
=== Early career ===
Constantini made her international curling debut at the 2016 Winter Youth Olympics in the mixed team as third for Luca Rizzolli. The team went 3–4 through the round robin but lost in a tiebreaker to Turkey's Oğuzhan Karakurt. She also competed in the mixed doubles event with British curler Callum Kinnear. The pair made it to the final eight, where they lost to China's Zhao Ruiyi and Norway's Andreas Hårstad.

=== 2017–18 season ===
Constantini was added to the Italian National Women's Curling Team for the 2017–18 season as the team's second. The team also consisted of skip Diana Gaspari, third Veronica Zappone, lead Angela Romei, and alternate Chiara Olivieri. The team's first international event of the season came at the 2017 European Curling Championships in St. Gallen, Switzerland. The team played well through the round robin and qualified for the playoffs over higher-ranked teams such as Russia's Anna Sidorova and Germany's Daniela Jentsch. After losing in the semifinal to Sweden's Anna Hasselborg, the Italian team upset Switzerland's Silvana Tirinzoni 7–6 to earn the bronze medal, Italy's third-ever medal in the women's event at the European Championships. Next, the Italian women's rink competed in the 2017 Olympic Qualification Event in attempts to earn a spot in the 2018 Winter Olympics in PyeongChang, South Korea. The team once again performed well at the event, finishing the round robin in first place with a 5–1 record. This gave them two opportunities to secure their spot in the Olympics. In the first qualification final, the Italian side gave up nine stolen points against China's Wang Bingyu, ultimately losing the game 11–4. They had a second opportunity to qualify for the Games against Denmark's Madeleine Dupont in the second qualification final. In a tight game, Denmark's Dupont scored one in the extra end to win 5–4 and earn the final spot in the Olympics, meaning Italy would miss out on the Games. The team had one more international event during the season with Constantini competing in her first World Curling Championship at the 2018 World Women's Curling Championship. Despite their prior success, Team Gaspari finished in last at the World Championship with a 2–10 record, only defeating Scotland's Hannah Fleming and Russia's Victoria Moiseeva. Still of junior age, Constantini also skipped the Italian Junior Women's Team at the 2018 World Junior B Curling Championships, finishing in fifth place with a 5–2 record.

=== 2018–19 season ===
With Diana Gaspari stepping away from the women's team, Constantini was promoted to third on the Italian rink, with Veronica Zappone taking over as skip for the 2018–19 season. Romei moved up to play second while Frederica Ghedina and Elena Dami were added at lead and alternate, respectively. The team remained in the A Division at the 2018 European Curling Championships but finished in last with a 2–7 record. This relegated Italy to the B Division for the 2019 event, meaning they wouldn't qualify for the 2019 World Women's Curling Championship. Despite their result, Constantini was still of junior age and once again skipped the Italian women's rink at the 2019 World Junior-B Curling Championships. Her team finished with a 3–3 record, not enough to advance to the final eight playoff round. Two months later, in March 2019, Constantini skipped Team Italy at the 2019 Winter Universiade where her team finished in last with a 2–7 record.

By finishing last at the 2018 edition, the Zappone rink was relegated to the B Division of the 2019 European Curling Championships, where they would need to finish in the top two to promote themselves back into the A Division and earn a spot in the 2020 World Qualification Event. Through the round robin, the team suffered two defeats en route to a second-place finish in the group, only behind Turkey's Dilşat Yıldız who handed the Italian's one of their two losses. Team Zappone faced Hungary's Dorottya Palancsa in the semifinal and won the game 9–4, earning themselves a spot in the final where they would go against the Turkish side. The Italian's opened up a comfortable lead through the first five ends, which they rode to a 5–2 victory over Turkey and a gold medal in the B Division. Their win secured their spot in the World Qualification Event in January 2020, where two countries would qualify for the 2020 World Women's Curling Championship. The team finished 6–1 through the round robin, only losing to the unbeaten South Korean team of Gim Un-chi. They then faced Gim's rink in the first qualification game, where South Korea made a comeback in the second half of the game to beat the Italians 6–5. They then faced Yıldız's Turkish rink in the second qualification game for the final spot in the World Championship, which they won 8–4. Unfortunately, the World Championship was cancelled due to the COVID-19 pandemic. In her last year of junior eligibility, Constantini's junior rink finished the 2019 World Junior-B Curling Championships with a 5–1 record.

Due to the pandemic, the European Curling Championships were canceled. As a result, the field for the 2021 World Women's Curling Championship was expanded to fourteen teams as many countries did not have the opportunity to qualify for the Championship. Based on their success at the 2020 World Qualification Event, the Italian women's team earned the fourteenth and final spot in the championship. Constantini moved up to skip the Italian team which also included third Marta Lo Deserto, second Angela Romei, lead Giulia Zardini Lacedelli and alternate Elena Dami. The team finished in thirteenth place at the Championship with a 2–11 record, defeating Estonia's Marie Turmann and Germany's Daniela Jentsch. In May 2021, Constantini teamed up with Amos Mosaner to compete in the 2021 World Mixed Doubles Curling Championship, Constantini's first time playing in the mixed doubles discipline since her appearance at the 2016 Winter Youth Olympics. Italy's results were unaffected by Constantini's lack of experience in the discipline, as the Italian duo won seven of their nine round robin games and qualified for the playoff round. By doing so, they also qualified Italy for the mixed doubles tournament of the 2022 Winter Olympics in Beijing, China, Italy's first time competing in the event as they missed out on qualification for the 2018 Winter Olympics. In the playoff round, Constantini and Mosaner faced Norway's Kristin Skaslien and Magnus Nedregotten in the quarterfinal round. The team couldn't overcome an early deficit and lost the match 7–5.

=== 2021–22 season ===
Constantini continued skipping the Italian women's team into the 2021–22 season. At the 2021 European Curling Championships in Lillehammer, Norway, she led her team to a 4–5 round robin record. This placed them sixth in the group, which was good enough to earn Italy a spot in the 2022 World Women's Curling Championship. In the sixth round robin draw, the team defeated Scotland's Eve Muirhead 8–7, being the only team to defeat the Scottish side as they went on to win the gold medal in the playoff round. In December 2021, the team traveled to Leeuwarden, Netherlands to compete in the 2021 Olympic Qualification Event, hoping to secure Italy a spot in the women's event at the Beijing Olympics. After eight draws, the Italian team sat in fourth place in the standings with a 4–3 record. They faced Muirhead's British side in their final round robin draw, with the chance to secure the fourth playoff spot. The team, however, would lose 8–1 to Team Muirhead, meaning Latvia earned the last playoff spot instead of them. Constantini still got to compete in the Olympics, however, in the mixed doubles discipline with Amos Mosaner because of their strong finish at the 2021 World Championship. The team entered the mixed doubles tournament as underdogs but rose to international fame with their strong play and team dynamics. Against a stacked field, the Italian pair finished the round robin with a perfectly unblemished 9–0 record, three games ahead of the second place Norway who were 6–3. This earned them a spot in the playoff round, where they easily defeated Sweden's Almida de Val and Oskar Eriksson to advance to the gold medal game. In the final, Constantini and Mosaner took on Norway's pair of Kristin Skaslien and Magnus Nedregotten, who were the team that knocked them out of the 2021 World Championship. The Italian team gave up a steal of two in the first end but quickly found their footing with six points in the next three ends. Leading 7–5 in the eighth and final end, Constantini secured the gold medal for Italy with a double takeout to count a single point and win the game 8–5. It was Italy's first ever medal in curling at the Olympics, and first medal of any color won at an Olympic or World Championship event. Back with her women's team, Constantini led her rink to a 4–8 tenth-place finish at the World Women's Championship, defeating the Czech Republic, Norway, Scotland, and Turkey. She finished the season competing at the 2022 World Mixed Doubles Curling Championship, however this time with partner Sebastiano Arman in place of Mosaner. After a strong 5–0 start, the pair lost three of their last four games to miss the playoffs with a 6–3 record.

=== 2022–23 season ===
The 2022–23 season was a breakthrough year for the Italian women's team as they rose to the top ranks in the world. After two quarterfinal finishes in their first three events, the team won their first tour event at the S3 Group Curling Stadium Series, defeating Ha Seung-youn 7–3 in the championship game. They played in Swift Current again the following weekend at the 2022 Western Showdown where they lost in the semifinals to Meghan Walter. At the 2022 European Curling Championships, the team entered the knockout round for the first time since 2017, posting a second place 6–3 record through the round robin. They could not continue their momentum into the playoffs, however, losing both the semifinal and the bronze medal game to Switzerland and Scotland respectively to finish fourth. With their strong results accumulated during the season, Team Constantini qualified for their first Grand Slam of Curling event at the 2023 Canadian Open. After starting the event 0–2, they stayed alive with narrow victories over Casey Scheidegger and Tabitha Peterson. They then lost in the C qualifier game to Anna Hasselborg, eliminating them from contention. At the 2023 World Women's Curling Championship, the Italian team qualified for the playoffs for the first time in world women's championship history, finishing fourth in the round robin with a 7–5 record. They then lost the qualification game to Sweden 4–3, finishing fifth. Constantini again finished the season at the 2023 World Mixed Doubles Curling Championship with Sebastiano Arman. They finished sixth in their group with a 4–5 record. In the off season, the team added Swiss curler Elena Mathis at third as she has dual citizenship in both Switzerland and Italy.

=== 2023–24 season ===
Following their breakthrough season, Team Constantini had an even stronger 2023–24 season, becoming the first Italian women's team to rank inside the top ten in the world. At their first event, the team went undefeated at the 2023 Euro Super Series until the final where they lost to Delaney Strouse. They then had a semifinal finish at the 2023 Women's Masters Basel after a narrow loss to Hasselborg. In Canada, the team had five consecutive playoff appearances. After quarterfinal losses at the 2023 Players Open and the 2023 Tour Challenge, Team Constantini won the North Grenville Women's Fall Curling Classic, going undefeated to capture the title. They then made it to the semifinals of the Stu Sells 1824 Halifax Classic before another quarterfinal finish at the 2023 National. Next for the team was the 2023 European Curling Championships where they improved on their 2022 result, finishing second through the round robin with a 7–2 record. They then downed Sweden's Isabella Wranå in the semifinals to qualify for the final against Switzerland's Silvana Tirinzoni. After the Italians got two in the ninth to take the lead, Swiss fourth Alina Pätz made a perfect hit-and-roll to the button in the tenth end to count two and win the game 6–5. The team then fell into a slump, only qualifying in one of their next four events. They also lost the final of the Italian Women's Championship to the junior Rebecca Mariani rink. Despite this, they were still chosen to represent Italy at the 2024 World Women's Curling Championship in Sydney, Nova Scotia. There, the team got back to their winning ways, finishing 10–2 through the round robin and qualifying for the playoffs as the third seeds. They then beat Denmark's Madeleine Dupont to qualify for the final four before losing both the semifinal and bronze medal game to Switzerland and Korea respectively, placing fourth. Team Constantini ended the season at the 2024 Players' Championship where they went 1–4. In April, Constantini made her fourth appearance at the World Mixed Doubles Championship, this time with partner Francesco De Zanna. The pair started the event with wins in five of their first six games before losing to both Norway and Estonia down the stretch, finishing just outside the playoffs at 6–3.

=== 2024–25 season ===
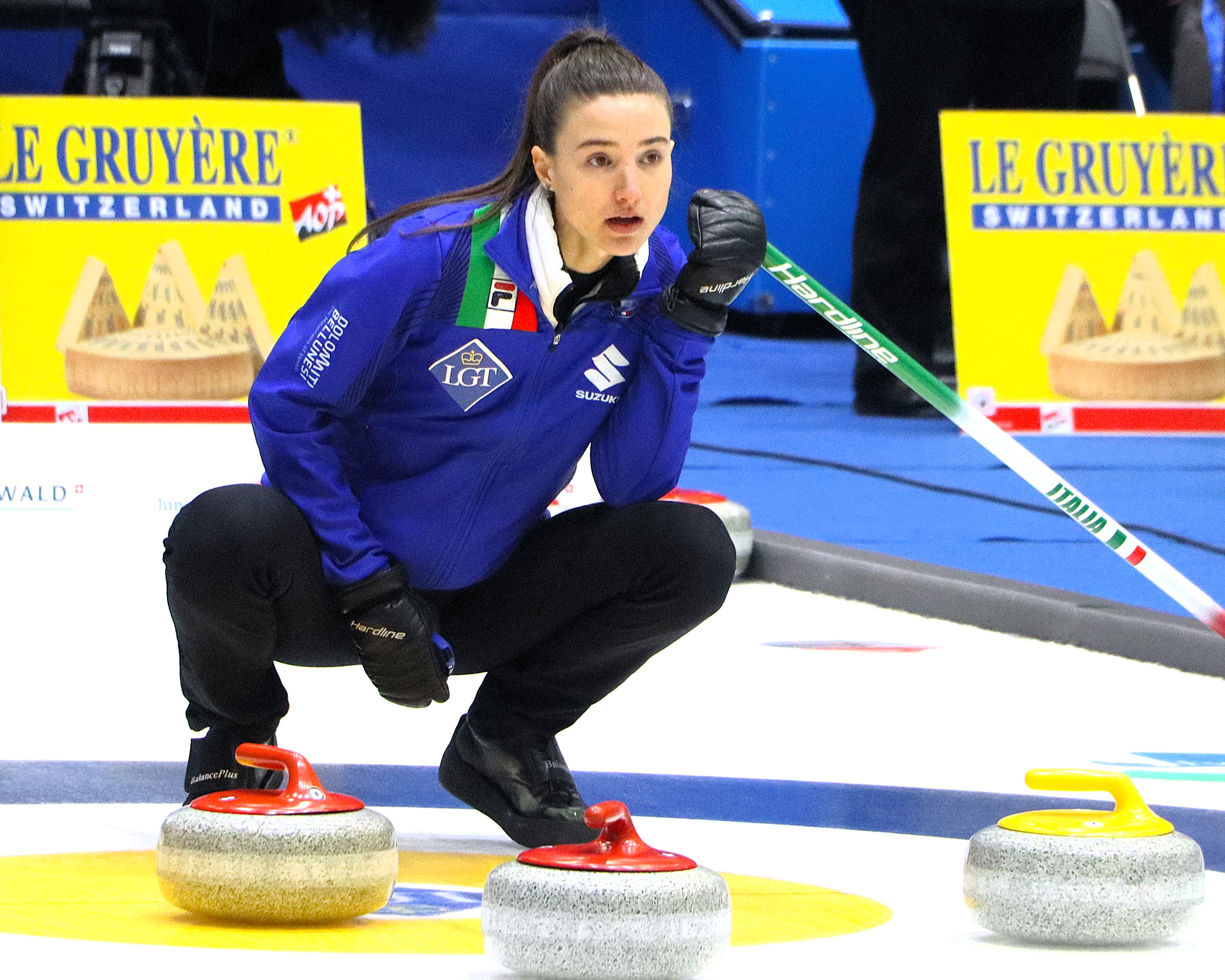
Stefania Constantini at 2025 World Championship

To begin the 2024–25 season, Team Constantini reached the final of the 2024 Euro Super Series, again finishing second place after falling to Fay Henderson. They then had a pair of quarterfinal finishes at the 2024 Stu Sells Oakville Tankard and the 2024 Women's Masters Basel before playing in the first Grand Slam of the season, the 2024 Tour Challenge. There, Team Constantini won all three of their games in the A event, advancing to the playoffs where they lost to Kaitlyn Lawes. After another quarterfinal finish at the 2024 Canadian Open, the team played in the 2024 European Curling Championships where they started by winning six of their first seven games. However, they then lost their final two round robin games before dropping both their playoff games to Switzerland and Scotland respectively, finishing fourth. In the new year, the team won the Italian Women's Championship and went on to compete in the 2025 World Women's Curling Championship. There, they were unable to replicate their success from the year before, finishing in tenth with a disappointing 4–8 record.

At the end of the season, for the first time since their 2022 Olympic gold medal performance, Constantini reunited with Amos Mosaner to represent Italy at the 2025 World Mixed Doubles Curling Championship. There, the pair continued their dominant run, winning all eleven of their games en route to claiming the world championship title.

=== 2025–26 season ===
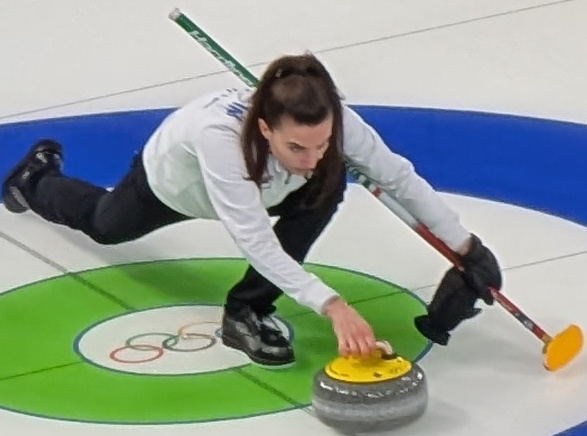
Stefania Constantini at the 2026 Winter Olympics

During the 2025-26 season, Team Constantini experienced significant lineup changes and poor results, culminating in the disbanding of the rink. They began the season with a semifinal loss to Rebecca Morrison in the 2025 Euro Super Series. In the 2025 Women's Masters Basel, they reached the finals, losing 7-3 to Silvana Tirinzoni. In Grand Slam events, Team Constantini failed to reach the playoffs in two of the three Grand Slam events they participated in, and failed to qualify for the other two Grand Slam events. They went 1-3 in both the 2025 Masters and 2025 Canadian Open. They went 3-2 in the 2025 Tour Challenge, with both of their losses coming against Xenia Schwaller, once in the round robin, and once in the quarterfinals. Team Constantini struggled at the 2025 European Curling Championships, finishing in 7th place with a 4-5 record. Team Constantini switched Giulia Zardini Lacedelli to lead and Elena Mathis to third for the European Curling Championships. The pair had spent the previous season and the first part of the 2025-26 campaign at third and second, respectively. This was also the first major tournament of the season that Angela Romei played in, replacing Marta Lo Deserto, and playing second.

The curling events in the 2026 Winter Olympics were held in Cortina d'Ampezzo, Italy, Constantini's hometown. Constantini and Amos Mosaner won their second consecutive Olympic medal, taking bronze in the mixed doubles tournament. They finished 2nd in the round robin, with their only losses coming against Canada, eventual gold medalists Sweden, and Great Britain. They lost a close semifinal to the USA, 9-8, before rebounding with a 5-3 victory over Great Britain in the bronze medal match. Constantini also became just the second skip to lead an Italian women's curling team at the Winter Olympics, marking Italy's first appearance in the women's tournament since 2006. Two weeks before the start of the Olympics, it was announced that Rebecca Mariani, daughter of Italian curling’s technical director, would be the alternate for the Olympic team. Mariani was chosen to replace Angela Romei, one of Constantini's best friends, despite little evidence of regularly playing with Constantini. Later, teammate Marta Lo Deserto said that Romei's exclusion "certainly affected the team atmosphere". Team Italy would go on to finish in 9th place at the 2026 Winter Olympics with a record of 2-7. They lost their first five games before defeating Team USA (Tabitha Peterson) and Team Japan (Sayaka Yoshimura), then closed the tournament with two consecutive losses.

At the 2026 World Women's Curling Championship, the team reverted to its early-season lineup, with Zardini Lacedelli returning to third, Mathis to second, and Lo Deserto to lead, while Mariani remained as alternate but did not appear in a game. The team finished eighth with a 5-7 record. Constantini also competed in the inaugural season of the Rock League for the Frontier Curling Club, where they finished in last place. She concluded her season alongside Amos Mosaner at the 2026 World Mixed Doubles Curling Championship, where they finished 4th. They placed 2nd in their group to qualify for the playoffs, defeating Japan 7-6 in the quarterfinals and then losing 7-6 to eventual champions Australia in the semifinals. In the bronze medal match, they were defeated by Canada 11-3. On 3 May 2026, Team Constantini announced they were splitting up. Constantini announced her new team on 25 May 2026, consisting of herself, Angela Romei, and sisters Lucrezia Grande and Allegra Grande.

== Personal life ==
In 2022, Constantini was employed by the Gruppo Sportivo Fiamme Oro, the sports team of the Italian national police force. She has dated ice hockey goaltender Domenico Dalla Santa since she was 15. Constantini moved to Pinerolo at the end of the 2025-26 season.

== Grand Slam record ==
Key
C	Champion
F	Lost in Final
SF	Lost in Semifinal
QF	Lost in Quarterfinals
R16	Lost in the round of 16
Q	Did not advance to playoffs
T2	Played in Tier 2 event
DNP	Did not participate in event
N/A	Not a Grand Slam event that season

Event	2022–23	2023–24	2024–25	2025–26
Masters	DNP	Q	Q	Q
Tour Challenge	DNP	QF	QF	QF
The National	DNP	QF	Q	DNP
Canadian Open	Q	DNP	QF	Q
Players'	DNP	Q	DNP	DNP

== Teams ==
Season	Skip	Third	Second	Lead	Alternate
2016–17	Stefania Constantini	Elena Dami	Valeria Girardi	Arianna Losano	
2017–18	Diana Gaspari	Veronica Zappone	Stefania Constantini	Angela Romei	Chiara Olivieri
2017–18	Stefania Constantini	Valeria Girardi	Giulia Zardini Lacedelli	Elisa De Zordo	Lorenza Piccin
2018–19	Veronica Zappone	Stefania Constantini	Angela Romei	Elena Dami	Federica Ghedini
2018–19	Stefania Constantini	Giulia Zardini Lacedelli	Valeria Girardi	Lorenza Piccin	Marta Lo Deserto
2019–20	Veronica Zappone	Stefania Constantini	Angela Romei	Giulia Zardini Lacedelli	Elena Dami
2019–20	Stefania Constantini	Giulia Zardini Lacedelli	Lorenza Piccin	Denise Fundone	Katia Sottsass
2020–21	Stefania Constantini	Marta Lo Deserto	Angela Romei	Giulia Zardini Lacedelli	Elena Dami
2021–22	Stefania Constantini	Marta Lo Deserto	Angela Romei	Giulia Zardini Lacedelli	Elena Dami
2022–23	Stefania Constantini	Marta Lo Deserto	Angela Romei	Giulia Zardini Lacedelli	Camilla Gilberti
2023–24	Stefania Constantini	Elena Mathis	Angela Romei	Giulia Zardini Lacedelli	Marta Lo Deserto
2024–25	Stefania Constantini	Giulia Zardini Lacedelli	Elena Mathis	Angela Romei	Marta Lo Deserto
2025–26	Stefania Constantini	Elena Mathis	Angela Romei	Giulia Zardini Lacedelli	Marta Lo Deserto
2025–26	Stefania Constantini	Elena Mathis	Marta Lo Deserto	Giulia Zardini Lacedelli	Rebecca Mariani
2026–27	Stefania Constantini	Lucrezia Grande	Angela Romei	Allegra Grande	

== See also ==
- Italian sportswomen multiple medalists at Olympics and World Championships
