= Fan Suyuan =

Chinese curler

Fan Suyuan 范苏圆
- Curler ♀
- Born: 1 August 1996 (age 30); Dunhua, Jilin, China

Team
- Curling club: Harbin CC, Harbin, CHN
- Mixed doubles partner: Ling Zhi

Curling career
- Member Association: China
- Olympic: 1 (2022)

Fan Suyuan (Chinese: 范苏圆; pinyin: Fàn Suyuan; born 1 August 1996) is a Chinese curler from Dunhua. She lives in Beijing.

She is competing in the mixed doubles curling event at the 2022 Winter Olympics with Ling Zhi.

== Career Path ==
On 3 July 2017, the third stage of the national curling team training camp ended at the Jilin Provincial Speed Skating Stadium. There are 3 men and 4 women in Jilin Province selected for this national team. The female players You Yanhui, Fan Suyuan, Wang Meini, and Yu Jiaxin.

In July 2019, she was awarded the title of National Athlete by the Winter Sports Center of the General Administration of Sports.

On 27 January 2022, the list of the Chinese sports delegation for the Beijing Winter Olympics was announced, and Fan Suyuan was selected for the curling team.

On 2 February 2022, the curling event of the 2022 Beijing Winter Olympics took the lead in the "Ice Cube". The Chinese curling mixed doubles combination Ling Zhi/Fan Suyuan took the lead for the Chinese delegation against the Swiss combination Peret/Rios.

On the evening of 2 February 2022, the first competition day of the Beijing Winter Olympics ended with four curling mixed doubles competitions. The Ling Zhi/Fan Suyuan combination, who played as the host, ushered in the first opponent in the round-robin match, the Swiss combination Peret/Rios, on the D track. After an extra round, the Chinese combination narrowly defeated the opponent 7-6 and got a good start.

On 3 February 2022, in the Beijing Winter Olympics curling mixed doubles round robin, Ling Zhi and Fan Suyuan defeated the Australian team 6-5.

On the evening of 3 February 2022, the Chinese team played against the Swedish teams De Waal and Eriksson in the fourth round of the curling round-robin match. Chinese curling mixed doubles players Ling Zhi/Fan Suyuan lost 6:7 to Sweden, ending their winning streak.

On 6 February 2022, in the Beijing Winter Olympics curling mixed doubles match between China and Italy, the Chinese combination Fan Suyuan and Ling Zhi lost 4:8 to the Italian team and missed the semi-finals.

On 7 February 2022, in the 13th round of the Beijing Winter Olympics curling mixed doubles round-robin match, Ling Zhi/Fan Suyuan lost to Czech players Thomas Paul/Suzanne Paulova 6-8. The two-game winning streak started, but then suffered a 7-game losing streak. Ling Zhi/Fan Suyuan finally ended the Winter Olympics in ninth place.

== Teams ==
=== Women's ===
Season	Skip	Third	Second	Lead	Alternate	Events
2016–17	Ma Jingyi	Dong Ziqi	Fan Suyuan	Gao Xue Song		
2018–19	Zhang Di	Wang Meini	Fan Suyuan	Yan Hui		
2019–20	Han Siyu	Fan Suyuan	Yu Jiaxin	Yan Hui	Zhang Di	

=== Mixed doubles ===
Season	Female	Male	Coach	Events
2019–20	Fan Suyuan	Nan Jiawen		
2021–22	Fan Suyuan	Ling Zhi	Tomi Rantamäki	WOG 2022 (9th)

== Personal life ==
Fan Suyuan's lover, Chen Zi'ang, is from Harbin. Before retiring, he was also a curling player and played for the national team for many years. After retiring, Chen Zi'ang served as the coach of the Guizhou Liupanshui curling team. Before the 2022 Beijing Winter Olympics, Chen Zi'ang revealed that the two had not seen each other for more than 200 days because of the preparations for the Winter Olympics, but they had no regrets. Chen Zi'ang also said that after the game, he would definitely hold the biggest wedding for Fan Suyuan.
