= Westbay Hungarian Mixed Doubles Curling Cup =

World Curling Tour event

The Westbay Hungarian Mixed Doubles Curling Cup, also known as the Westbay ISS WCT Hungarian Open Mixed Doubles Championship, is an annual mixed doubles curling tournament on the ISS Mixed Doubles World Curling Tour. It is held annually in March at the Kamaraerdei Curling Club in Budapest, Hungary.

The purse for the event is €5,000. and its event categorization is 300 (highest calibre is 1000).

The event has been held since 2008, and has been part of the World Curling Tour since 2018.

== Past champions (since 2014) ==
| Year | Winning pair | Runner up pair | Third place | Fourth place | Purse (€) |
|---|---|---|---|---|---|
| 2014 | (Hungary) Dorottya Palancsa & Zsolt Kiss | (Sweden) Marie Persson & Göran Carlsson | (Austria) Claudia Fischer & Christian Roth | (Hungary) Orsolya Rókusfalvy & Gábor Ézsöl | €1,200 |
| 2015 | (Hungary) Dorottya Palancsa & Zsolt Kiss | (Hungary) Ildikó Szekeres & György Nagy | (Sweden) Marie Persson & Göran Carlsson | (Latvia) Dace Regža & Ansis Regža | €1,000 |
| 2016 | (Russia) Anastasia Bryzgalova & Alexander Krushelnitskiy | (Scotland) Judith McCleary & Lee McCleary | (Hungary) Ildikó Szekeres & György Nagy | (Russia) Victoria Moiseeva & Petr Dron | €2,000 |
| 2017 | (Russia) Maria Komarova & Daniil Goriachev | (Hungary) Dorottya Palancsa & Zsolt Kiss | (Scotland) Gina Aitken & Bruce Mouat | (Hungary) Ildikó Szekeres & György Nagy | |
| 2018 | (Hungary) Ildikó Szekeres & György Nagy | (Russia) Anastasia Moskaleva & Alexander Eremin | (Scotland) Judith McCleary & Lee McCleary | (Russia) Maria Komarova & Daniil Goriachev | €3,100 |
| 2019 | (Russia) Anastasia Moskaleva & Alexander Eremin | (Hungary) Dorottya Palancsa & Zsolt Kiss | (Hungary) Ildikó Szekeres & György Nagy | (Hungary) Blanka Pathy-Dencső & Gergely Szabó | €5,000 |
| 2020 | (Russia) Anastasia Moskaleva & Alexander Eremin | (Hungary) Blanka Dencső & Gergely Szabó | (Hungary) Dorottya Palancsa & Zsolt Kiss | (Hungary) Ildikó Szekeres & György Nagy | €5,000 |
| 2021 | (Hungary) Dorottya Palancsa & Zsolt Kiss | (Hungary) Ildikó Szekeres & György Nagy | (Hungary) Linda Joó & Lőrinc Tatár | (Hungary) Bernadett Bíró & Gergely Szabó | €5,000 |
