= Palancsa =

Palancsa is a surname. Notable people with the surname include:

- Dorottya Palancsa (born 1995), Hungarian curler
- Zoltán Palancsa (born 1963), Hungarian curler and coach
