= Hungarian Mixed Doubles Curling Championship =

The Hungarian Mixed Doubles Curling Championship is the national championship of mixed doubles curling in Hungary. It has been held annually since 2007.

== List of champions and medallists ==
Year	Champion (woman, man)	Runner-up	Bronze	Finish at Worlds
2007	Wallis SC; Ildikó Szekeres / György Nagy			–
2008	WSC; Ildikó Szekeres / György Nagy			9
2009	FTC Wild Catz; Ágnes Patonai / Péter Sárdi			2nd place, silver medalist(s)
2010	Westbay SC; Ildikó Szekeres / György Nagy			11
2011	Westbay SC; Ildikó Szekeres / György Nagy			10
2012	UTE / Westbay SC; Dorottya Palancsa / Zsolt Kiss			13
2013	UTE / Westbay SC; Dorottya Palancsa / Zsolt Kiss			1st place, gold medalist(s)
2014	UTE / Westbay SC; Dorottya Palancsa / Zsolt Kiss			4
2015	UTE / Vasas SC; Dorottya Palancsa / Zsolt Kissш			1st place, gold medalist(s)
2016	UTE / Vasas SC; Dorottya Palancsa / Zsolt Kissш			13
2017	Vasas SC; Ildikó Szekeres / György Nagy			13
2018	UTE; Dorottya Palancsa / Zsolt Kiss			6
2020	UTE; Dorottya Palancsa / Zsolt Kiss			9
2021	UTE; Dorottya Palancsa / Zsolt Kiss	Vasas SC; Ildikó Szekeres / György Nagy	Linda Joó / Lőrinc Tatár	15
2022	Vasas SC; Ildikó Szekeres / György Nagy	Linda Joó / Lőrinc Tatár	Csilla Halász / Gábor Ézsöl	10
2023	Joó Linda (Vasas SC) / Tatár Lőrinc (UTE)	Kalocsai-van Dorp Vera / Kalocsay Ottó	Pintér Zsuzsanna / Varkoly Zoltán	19

== See also ==
- Hungarian Men's Curling Championship
- Hungarian Women's Curling Championship
- Hungarian Mixed Curling Championship
- Hungarian Junior Mixed Doubles Curling Championship
