= Ildikó Szekeres =

Hungarian female curler

- Curler
- Born: 6 February 1973 (age 53); Pécs, Hungary

Team
- Curling club: Wallis SC, Budapest
- Skip: Ágnes Szentannai
- Fourth: Ildikó Szekeres
- Third: Linda Joó
- Lead: Laura Nagy
- Alternate: Gyöngyi Nagy
- Mixed doubles partner: György Nagy

Curling career
- Member Association: Hungary
- World Mixed Doubles Championship: 6 (2008, 2009, 2011, 2012, 2018, 2022)
- European Championship: 12 (2003, 2004, 2005, 2006, 2007, 2008, 2009, 2010, 2011, 2012, 2013, 2021)
Medal record
Curling
Representing Hungary
World Mixed Doubles Championship
| Silver medal – second place | 2009 Cortina d'Ampezzo |
European Mixed Championship
| Bronze medal – third place | 2013 Edinburgh |

Ildikó Szekeres (Hungarian: Szekeres Ildikó; born 6 February 1973 in Pécs) is a Hungarian female curler.

On international level she is runner-up of 2009 World Mixed Doubles Curling Championship and bronze medallist of 2013 European Mixed Curling Championship.

On national level she is eleven-time Hungarian women's curling champion (2003, 2004, 2005, 2006, 2007, 2008, 2009, 2010, 2011, 2012, 2013), six-time Hungarian mixed curling champion (2005, 2008, 2011, 2013, 2014, 2015), five-time Hungarian mixed doubles curling champion (2007, 2008, 2010, 2011, 2017), six-time Hungarian Women's Curler of the Year (2005, 2007, 2009, 2010, 2011, 2015).

== Teams and events ==
=== Women's ===
| Season | Skip | Third | Second | Lead | Alternate | Coach | Events |
|---|---|---|---|---|---|---|---|
| 2003–04 | Ildikó Szekeres | Alexandra Béres | Gyöngyi Nagy | Krisztina Bartalus | | Darrell Ell | ECC 2003 (18th) |
| 2004–05 | Ildikó Szekeres | Alexandra Béres | Gyöngyi Nagy | Krisztina Bartalus | Rozsa Bota | Darrell Ell | ECC 2004 (14th) |
| 2005–06 | Ildikó Szekeres | Alexandra Béres | Gyöngyi Nagy | Krisztina Bartalus | | Darrell Ell | ECC 2005 (15th) |
| 2006–07 | Ildikó Szekeres | Alexandra Béres | Gyöngyi Nagy | Boglárka Ádám | | Darrell Ell | ECC 2006 (14th); HWCC 2007 (gold) |
| 2007–08 | Ildikó Szekeres | Alexandra Béres | Gyöngyi Nagy | Boglárka Ádám | Krisztina Bartalus | Darrell Ell | ECC 2007 (15th) |
| 2008–09 | Ildikó Szekeres | Alexandra Béres | Gyöngyi Nagy | Boglárka Ádám | | Darrell Ell | ECC 2008 (13th); HWCC 2009 (gold) |
| 2009–10 | Ildikó Szekeres | Gyöngyi Nagy | Boglárka Ádám | Krisztina Bartalus | | | ECC 2009 (15th) |
| 2009–10 | Ildikó Szekeres | Alexandra Béres | Gyöngyi Nagy | Boglárka Ádám | Krisztina Bartalus | | HWCC 2010 (gold) |
| 2010–11 | Ildikó Szekeres | Alexandra Béres | Gyöngyi Nagy | Boglárka Ádám | Krisztina Bartalus | Darrell Ell (ECC) | ECC 2010 (14th); HWCC 2011 (gold) |
| 2011–12 | Ildikó Szekeres | Alexandra Béres | Ágnes Patonai | Boglárka Ádám | Blanka Pathy-Dencsö | Gyöngyi Nagy (HWCC) | ECC 2011 (11th); HWCC 2012 (gold) |
| 2012–13 | Ildikó Szekeres | Alexandra Béres | Ágnes Patonai | Boglárka Ádám | Blanka Pathy-Dencsö | Gyöngyi Nagy | ECC 2012 (9th); HWCC 2013 (gold) |
| 2013–14 | Ildikó Szekeres | Ágnes Patonai | Blanka Pathy-Dencsö | Ágnes Szentannai | Alexandra Béres | Ole Ingvaldsen | ECC 2013 (16th) |
| 2014–15 | Ildikó Szekeres | Alexandra Béres | Gyöngyi Nagy | Blanka Pathy-Dencsö | Ágnes Szentannai | | |
| 2015–16 | Ildikó Szekeres | Ágnes Szentannai | Blanka Pathy-Dencsö | Gyöngyi Nagy | | | |
| 2021–22 | Ildikó Szekeres (Fourth) | Linda Joó | Ágnes Szentannai (Skip) | Laura Nagy | Gyöngyi Nagy | Zoltàn Jakab | ECC 2021 (13th) |

=== Mixed ===
| Season | Skip | Third | Second | Lead | Alternate | Coach | Events |
|---|---|---|---|---|---|---|---|
| 2004–05 | György Nagy | Ildikó Szekeres | Alexandra Béres | Krisztiàn Barna | | | HMxCC 2005 (gold) |
| 2005–06 | Ildikó Szekeres (fourth) | György Nagy (skip) | Alexandra Béres | Krisztiàn Barna | | | EMxCC 2005 (8th) |
| 2007–08 | György Nagy | Ildikó Szekeres | Zsombor Rokusfalvy | Boglárka Ádám | | | HMxCC 2008 (gold) |
| 2008–09 | György Nagy | Ildikó Szekeres | Zsombor Rokusfalvy | Boglárka Ádám | | | EMxCC 2008 (8th) |
| 2010–11 | György Nagy | Ildikó Szekeres | Gabor Ezsöl | Orsolya Rokusfalvy | Zoltàn Jakab, Judit Nagy | | HMxCC 2011 (gold) |
| 2011–12 | György Nagy | Ildikó Szekeres | Gabor Ezsöl | Orsolya Rokusfalvy | Csilla Halasz, Zoltàn Jakab | Joel Ostrowski | EMxCC 2011 (15th) |
| 2012–13 | György Nagy | Ildikó Szekeres | Zsolt Kiss | Ágnes Szentannai | Gyöngyi Nagy, Kristóf Czermann | | HMxCC 2013 (gold) |
| 2013–14 | György Nagy | Ildikó Szekeres | Zsolt Kiss | Ágnes Szentannai | | Zoltàn Jakab, Gyöngyi Nagy (HMxCC) | EMxCC 2013 (bronze); HMxCC 2014 (gold) |
| 2014–15 | György Nagy | Ildikó Szekeres | Zsolt Kiss | Ágnes Szentannai | | Zoltàn Jakab | EMxCC 2014 (5th) |
| 2014–15 | Zoltàn Jakab | Zsolt Kiss | Gyöngyi Nagy | György Nagy | Ildikó Szekeres, Ágnes Szentannai | | HMxCC 2015 (gold) |
| 2015–16 | György Nagy | Ildikó Szekeres | Zsolt Kiss | Ágnes Szentannai | | Zoltàn Jakab | WMxCC 2015 (9th) |

=== Mixed doubles ===
| Season | Male | Female | Coach | Events |
|---|---|---|---|---|
| 2007–08 | György Nagy | Ildikó Szekeres | Darrell Ell | WMDCC 2008 (9th) |
| 2008–09 | György Nagy | Ildikó Szekeres | Darrell Ell | WMDCC 2009 (silver) |
| 2010–11 | György Nagy | Ildikó Szekeres | Darrell Ell | WMDCC 2011 (10th) |
| 2011–12 | György Nagy | Ildikó Szekeres | Lajos Belleli | WMDCC 2012 (13th) |
| 2017–18 | György Nagy | Ildikó Szekeres | Darryl Horne | WMDCC 2018 (6th) |
| 2020–21 | György Nagy | Ildikó Szekeres | | |
| 2021–22 | György Nagy | Ildikó Szekeres | | |
