= Ágnes Szentannai =

Hungarian female curler

- Curler
- Born: 10 January 1994 (age 32); Budapest, Hungary

Team
- Curling club: Victorian Curling Association, Melbourne
- Skip: Jessica Wytrychowski
- Fourth: Ágnes Szentannai
- Second: Jennifer Westhagen
- Lead: Joanne Robins
- Alternate: Anne Powell

Curling career
- Member Association: Hungary (2011–2022); Australia (2026–Present)
- European Championship: 2 (2013, 2021)
Medal record
Curling
Representing Hungary
European Mixed Championship
Bronze medal – third place	2013 Edinburgh

Ágnes Szentannai (Hungarian: Szentannai Ágnes) is an Australian curler originally from Budapest before moving to Australia and competing for the Australian women's team.

On international level she is bronze medallist of 2013 European Mixed Curling Championship competing for Hungary.

On national level she is one-time Hungarian women's curling champion (2021), six-time Hungarian mixed curling champion (2012, 2013, 2014, 2015, 2016, 2018), two-time Hungarian junior women's curling champion (2012, 2013).

== Teams and events ==
=== Women's ===
Season	Skip	Third	Second	Lead	Alternate	Coach	Events
2011–12	Zsanett Gunzinám	Tímea Nagy	Ágnes Szentannai	Teodóra Tóth			HJWCC 2012 (gold)
2012–13	Dorottya Palancsa	Henrietta Miklai	Ágnes Szentannai	Tímea Nagy	Vera Kalocsai	Orsolya Rokusfalvy	EJCC 2013 (silver)
2012–13	Ágnes Szentannai	Teodóra Tóth	Lilla Beregszászi				HJWCC 2013 (gold)
2013–14	Ildikó Szekeres	Ágnes Patonai	Blanka Pathy-Dencsö	Ágnes Szentannai	Alexandra Béres	Ole Ingvaldsen	ECC 2013 (16th)
2013–14	Dorottya Palancsa	Ágnes Szentannai	Zsanett Gunzinam	Henrietta Miklai	Vera Kalocsai	Orsolya Rokusfalvy	EJCC 2014 (silver)
2014–15	Ildikó Szekeres	Alexandra Béres	Gyöngyi Nagy	Blanka Pathy-Dencsö	Ágnes Szentannai		
2014–15	Dorottya Palancsa	Ágnes Szentannai	Vera Kalocsai	Nikolett Sándor		Orsolya Rokusfalvy	EJCC 2015 (bronze)
2015–16	Ildikó Szekeres	Ágnes Szentannai	Blanka Pathy-Dencsö	Gyöngyi Nagy			
2021–22	Ildikó Szekeres (Fourth)	Linda Joó	Ágnes Szentannai (Skip)	Laura Nagy	Gyöngyi Nagy	Zoltàn Jakab	ECC 2021 (13th)
2026–27	Ágnes Szentannai (Fourth)	Jessica Wytrychowski (Skip)	Jennifer Westhagen	Joanne Robins	Anne Powell	Shannon Kleibrink	2026 World Qualifier

=== Mixed ===
Season	Skip	Third	Second	Lead	Alternate	Coach	Events
2011–12	Laszlo Kiss	Zsanett Gunzinam	Zsolt Kiss	Agnes Szentannai	Monika Szarvas, Kristóf Czermann		HMxCC 2012 (gold)
2012–13	György Nagy	Zsanett Gunzinam	Zsolt Kiss	Agnes Szentannai	Monika Szarvas, Laszlo Kiss	Laszlo Kiss	EMxCC 2012 (12th)
2012–13	György Nagy	Ildikó Szekeres	Zsolt Kiss	Ágnes Szentannai	Gyöngyi Nagy, Kristóf Czermann		HMxCC 2013 (gold)
2013–14	György Nagy	Ildikó Szekeres	Zsolt Kiss	Ágnes Szentannai		Zoltàn Jakab, Gyöngyi Nagy (HMxCC)	EMxCC 2013 (bronze); HMxCC 2014 (gold)
2014–15	György Nagy	Ildikó Szekeres	Zsolt Kiss	Ágnes Szentannai		Zoltàn Jakab	EMxCC 2014 (5th)
2014–15	Zoltàn Jakab	Zsolt Kiss	Gyöngyi Nagy	György Nagy	Ildikó Szekeres, Ágnes Szentannai		HMxCC 2015 (gold)
2015–16	György Nagy	Ildikó Szekeres	Zsolt Kiss	Ágnes Szentannai		Zoltàn Jakab	WMxCC 2015 (9th)
2015–16	Ágnes Szentannai	Dorottya Palancsa	Kristóf Czermann	Zsolt Kiss			HMxCC 2016 (gold)
2016–17	Zsolt Kiss	Dorottya Palancsa	Kristof Czermann	Ágnes Szentannai			WMxCC 2016 (9th)
2017–18	Ágnes Szentannai	Orsolya Toth-Csoesz	Dávid Balázs	Zsolt Kiss			HMxCC 2018 (gold)
