= Sofia Gustafsson =

Swedish female curler

- Curler ♀
- Born: 22 December 1990 (age 35)

Team
- Curling club: Härnösands CK, Härnösand

Curling career
- Member Association: Sweden
- World Mixed Doubles Championship: 1 (2009)
Medal record
Curling
Swedish Mixed Doubles Curling Championship
Gold medal – first place	2009

Sofia Kristina Maria Gustafsson (born 22 December 1990) is a Swedish female curler.

She is a 2009 Swedish mixed doubles curling champion.

== Teams ==
=== Women's ===
Season	Skip	Third	Second	Lead	Alternate	Events
2011–12	Sofia Gustafsson	Anna Gustafsson	Johanna Jonsson	Moa Soderberg		
2015–16	Towe Lundman	Anna Gustafsson	Johanna Heldin	Sofia Gustafsson	Elina Backman	SWCC 2016 (5th)

=== Mixed ===
Season	Skip	Third	Second	Lead	Events
2015–16	Sofia Gustafsson	Magnus Heldin	Anna Gustafsson	Olle Risby	SMxCC 2016 (13th)

=== Mixed doubles ===
Season	Male	Female	Events
2008–09	Andreas Prytz	Sofia Gustafsson	SMDCC 2009 (gold); WMDCC 2009 (7th)
