= Hungarian Mixed Curling Championship =

The Hungarian Mixed Curling Championship is the national championship of mixed curling teams in Hungary. It has been held annually since 2005.

== List of champions and medallists ==
Teams line-up in order: fourth, third, second, lead, alternate; skips marked bold.

Year	Champion	Runner-up	Bronze	Finish at Euros next season	Finish at Worlds next season
2005	WSC – CC Budapest; György Nagy, Ildikó Szekeres, Alexandra Béres, Krisztiàn Barna			8	
2006	Rókusfalvy Team; Rókusfalvy Zsombor, Rókusfalvy Orsolya, Rókusfalvy András, Rókusfalvy Zsófia			14	
2007	WILD CATZ; Sárdi Péter, Patonai Ágnes, Szabad Tamás, Kazacsay Orsolya, Tatorján Írisz			14	
2008	WSC; György Nagy, Ildikó Szekeres, Rókusfalvy Zsombor, Ádám Boglárka			8	
2009	Makuka (FTC – BTE); Ézsöl Gábor, Rókusfalvy Orsolya, Rókusfalvy András, Halász Csilla, Huszlicska Dávid			11	
2010	Makuka; Ézsöl Gábor, Rókusfalvy Orsolya, Szabad Tamás, Halász Csilla, Rókusfalvy András			5	
2011	WSC MIX; György Nagy, Ildikó Szekeres, Ézsöl Gábor, Rókusfalvy Orsolya, Jakab Zoltán, Nagy Judit			15	
2012	WSC Raptors; Kiss László, Gunzinám Zsanett, Zsolt Kiss, Ágnes Szentannai, Szarvas Mónika, Czermann Kristóf			12	
2013	WSC Mix; György Nagy, Ildikó Szekeres, Zsolt Kiss, Ágnes Szentannai, Nagy Gyöngyi, Czermann Kristóf			3rd place, bronze medalist(s)	
2014	WSC Mix; György Nagy, Ildikó Szekeres, Zsolt Kiss, Ágnes Szentannai, Jakab Zoltán, Nagy Gyöngyi			5	
2015	WSC Mix; Jakab Zoltán, Zsolt Kiss, Nagy Gyöngyi, György Nagy, Ildikó Szekeres, Ágnes Szentannai				9
2016	Lynx; Ágnes Szentannai, Dorottya Palancsa, Czermann Kristóf, Zsolt Kiss				9
2017	NoTurners; Csősz Orsolya, Páthy-Dencső Blanka, Dr. Balázs Dávid, Szabó Gergely				9
2018	Mixszuri; Ágnes Szentannai, Tóth-Csősz Orsolya, Dr. Balázs Dávid, Zsolt Kiss				24
2019	Vasas Mix; Ildikó Szekeres, Dencső Blanka, Szabó Gergely, György Nagy				5
2020	FTC Hammer Time; Szurmai-Palotai Piroska, Ézsöl Gábor, Halász Csilla, Fóti Balázs				not held
2021	Vasas Mix; Ildikó Szekeres, Dencső Blanka, Szabó Gergely, György Nagy				not held
2022	Team Tatár; Kalocsai-van Dorp Vera, Kalocsay Ottó Dániel, Ágnes Szentannai, Tatár Lőrinc	Vasas Mix	UTE Sliding Mix		9
2023	FTC Hammer Time; Szabó Enikő, Ézsöl Gábor, Halász Csilla, Fóti Balázs	Team Tatár	Vasas Mix		.

== See also ==
- Hungarian Men's Curling Championship
- Hungarian Women's Curling Championship
- Hungarian Mixed Doubles Curling Championship
- Hungarian Junior Mixed Doubles Curling Championship
