= Lisa Peters =

British curler

Lisa Peters is a Welsh curler who represented Wales in the 2008, 2009 World Mixed Doubles Curling Championships, the 2009 European Curling Championships, and the 2010 European Curling Championships. She is one of Wales's two representatives to the World Curling Federation. She was born in Wrexham in north Wales.

Peters started curling in 2001 and plays for the Alyn Valley club at the Deeside Leisure Centre in north Wales.

She and her teammate, Phil Jones, were the first winners of the Hobart trophy (Welsh pairs championships) in 2007.

Outside of curling, Peters is a historian of newspapers in Victorian Wales. After completing a PhD at the University of Wales, Aberystwyth on Wrexham newspapers, 1848-1914 she turned it into a book called Politics, Publishing and Personalities: Wrexham Newspapers, 1848-1914 in 2011.
