= Hungarian Women's Curling Championship =

National Championship

The Hungarian Women's Curling Championship is the national championship of women's curling teams in Hungary. It has been held annually since 2003.

== List of champions and medallists ==
Teams line-up in order: fourth, third, second, lead, alternate; skips marked bold.

Year	Champion	Runner-up	Bronze	Finish at Euro next season
2003	CC Budapest; Ildikó Szekeres, Alexandra Béres, Bartalus Krisztina, Nagy Gyöngyi			18
2004	Wallis SC – CC Budapest; Ildikó Szekeres, Alexandra Béres, Bartalus Krisztina, Nagy Gyöngyi			14
2005	WSC – CC Budapest; Ildikó Szekeres, Alexandra Béres, Bartalus Krisztina, Nagy Gyöngyi			15
2006	WSC – CC Budapest; Ildikó Szekeres, Alexandra Béres, Bartalus Krisztina, Nagy Gyöngyi			14
2007	WSC Női I. Ildikó Szekeres, Alexandra Béres, Nagy Gyöngyi, Ádám Boglárka			15
2008	WSC Női; Ildikó Szekeres, Alexandra Béres, Nagy Gyöngyi, Ádám Boglárka, Bartalus Krisztina			13
2009	WSC Női; Ildikó Szekeres, Alexandra Béres, Nagy Gyöngyi, Ádám Boglárka, Bartalus Krisztina			15
2010	WSC Női; Ildikó Szekeres, Alexandra Béres, Nagy Gyöngyi, Ádám Boglárka, Bartalus Krisztina			14
2011	WSC Női 1. Ildikó Szekeres, Alexandra Béres, Nagy Gyöngyi, Ádám Boglárka, Bartalus Krisztina			11
2012	WSC Női 1. Ildikó Szekeres, Alexandra Béres, Patonai Ágnes, Ádám Boglárka, Páthy-Dencső Blanka, Nagy Gyöngyi			9
2013	WSC Női 1. Ildikó Szekeres, Alexandra Béres, Patonai Ágnes, Ádám Boglárka, Páthy-Dencső Blanka			16
2014	UTE Bálnák; Dorottya Palancsa, Miklai Henrietta, Kalocsai Vera, Sándor Nikolett, Nagy Tímea			12
2015	UTE Bálnák; Dorottya Palancsa, Miklai Henrietta, Kalocsai Vera, Sándor Nikolett, Nagy Tímea			10
2016	Team Palancsa; Dorottya Palancsa, Miklai Henrietta, Sándor Nikolett, Kalocsai Vera, Bíró Bernadett			11
2017	UTE Team Palancsa; Dorottya Palancsa, Miklai Henrietta, Sándor Nikolett, Kalocsai Vera, Micheller Dorottya			10
2018	UTE Team Palancsa; Dorottya Palancsa, Miklai Henrietta, Sándor Nikolett, Micheller Dorottya			15
2019	UTE Team Palancsa; Dorottya Palancsa, Miklai Henrietta, Sándor Nikolett, Rókusfalvy Orsolya, Micheller Dorottya			13
2020	UTE Team Palancsa; Dorottya Palancsa, Miklai Henrietta, Sándor Nikolett, Micheller Dorottya, Hamvas Villő	FTC Girl Jam	Hackers	not held
2021	Vasas Nők; Ágnes Szentannai, Ildikó Szekeres, Nagy Laura Karolina, Joó Linda, Nagy Lola, coach: György Nagy	UTE Team Palancsa	FTC Girl Jam	13
2022	FTC Girl Jam; Nagy Tímea, Biró Blanka, Halász Csilla, Biró Bernadett, Gunzinám Zsanett	UTE Women	SSC Nők	9
2023	Vasas Nők; Joó Linda, Kalocsai-van Dorp Vera, Nagy Laura Karolina, Orbán Hanna Regina, Tóth-Csősz Orsolya, Ildikó Szekeres	Hackers	FTC Girl Jam	.

== See also ==
- Hungarian Men's Curling Championship
- Hungarian Mixed Doubles Curling Championship
- Hungarian Mixed Curling Championship
- Hungarian Junior Mixed Doubles Curling Championship
