= Hungarian Men's Curling Championship =

The Hungarian Men's Curling Championship is the national championship of men's curling teams in Hungary. It has been held annually since 2003.

== List of champions and medallists ==
Teams line-up in order: fourth, third, second, lead, alternate; skips marked bold.

| Year | Champion | Runner-up | Bronze | Finish at Euro next season |
|---|---|---|---|---|
| 2003 | CC Budapest; György Nagy, Viktora Zsolt, Barna Krisztián, Bartalus Gábor, Németh Balázs | | | 17 |
| 2004 | Wallis SC – CC Budapest; György Nagy, Viktora Zsolt, Barna Krisztián, Bartalus Gábor, Németh Balázs | | | 17 |
| 2005 | WSC – CC Budapest; György Nagy, Viktora Zsolt, Barna Krisztián, Bartalus Gábor, Németh Balázs | | | 17 |
| 2006 | WSC – CC Budapest; György Nagy, Viktora Zsolt, Barna Krisztián, Bartalus Gábor, Németh Balázs | | | 14 |
| 2007 | Békési TE- Jégmadarak; Lajos Belleli, Riesz Gábor, Ezsöl Gabor, Nyitrai József, Kerekes Olivér | | | 16 |
| 2008 | WSC Férfi 1. György Nagy, Németh Balázs, Rókusfalvy Zsombor, Barna Krisztián, Jakab Zoltán | | | 13 |
| 2009 | BTE Jégmadarak; Lajos Belleli, Riesz Gábor, Rókusfalvy András, Nyitrai József, Molnár Gábor | | | 13 |
| 2010 | BTE Jégmadarak; Lajos Belleli, Riesz Gábor, Rókusfalvy András, Rókusfalvy Zsombor, Molnár Gábor | | | 23 |
| 2011 | WSC Férfi 1. György Nagy, Ezsöl Gabor, Hall Krisztián, Jakab Zoltán, Zsolt Kiss, Gazdagh Pál | | | 12 |
| 2012 | WSC Férfi 1. György Nagy, Ezsöl Gabor, Hall Krisztián, Lajos Belleli, Zsolt Kiss, Gazdagh Pál | | | 10 |
| 2013 | WSC – Jégfarkasok; Hall Krisztián, Ezsöl Gabor, Lajos Belleli, Varga Balázs, Pünkösti Zoltán | | | 13 |
| 2014 | WSC – Jégfarkasok; Hall Krisztián, Ezsöl Gabor, Lajos Belleli, Varga Balázs, Nyitrai József, Vaspöri Tamás | | | 14 |
| 2015 | WSC Férfi 1. Balázs Dávid, Bodor Gábor, Czermann Kristóf, Jakab Zoltán, Zsolt Kiss, György Nagy | | | 20 |
| 2016 | Westbay-Vasas; Zsolt Kiss, György Nagy, Czermann Kristóf, Balázs Dávid, Rókusfalvy Zsombor | | | 18 |
| 2017 | Jégmadarak; Varga Balázs, Riesz Gábor, Ezsöl Gabor, Fóti Balázs, Szabad Tamás | | | 21 |
| 2018 | UTE Férfi 1. Zsolt Kiss, Czermann Kristóf, Dr. Balázs Dávid, Szarvas Kristóf, Tatár Lőrinc | | | 20 |
| 2019 | UTE Ifjonti Hév; Gazdag Zsombor, Palancsa Péter, Gubányi Attila, Sámson István, Kalocsay Ottó | | | 24 |
| 2020 | UTE Férfi 1. Zsolt Kiss, Tatár Lőrinc, Kispataki Viktor, Callum Macfarlane, Dr. Balázs Dávid, Czermann Kristóf | FTC DreamTeam | Vasas G-Force | not held |
| 2021 | FTC Dream Team; Hall Krisztián, Varga Balázs, Szabad Tamás, Ézsöl Gábor, Fóti Balázs | | | 19 |
| 2022 | UTE Férfi I. Callum Macfarlane, Kalocsay Ottó, Tatár Lőrinc, Czermann Kristóf, Zsolt Kiss, Dr. Balázs Dávid | Vasas G-Force | FTC Fatherock | 20 |
| 2023 | Team Czermann; Kárász Raul, Dr. Balázs Dávid, Czermann Kristóf, Zsolt Kiss, Kalocsay Ottó, Callum Macfarlane | Vasas G-Force | FTC Fatherock | . |

== See also ==
- Hungarian Women's Curling Championship
- Hungarian Mixed Doubles Curling Championship
- Hungarian Mixed Curling Championship
- Hungarian Junior Mixed Doubles Curling Championship
