= Darrell Ell =

Canadian curler and coach

- Curler ♂

Curling career
- Member Association: Canada

Darrell Ell is a Canadian curler and curling coach from Lethbridge, Alberta.

He is a long-time coach of Canadian and European teams, and later on was coach of the Netherlands and Hungarian national teams at the World and European championships.

From 2011 to 2021 he worked for World Curling Federation as Competitions and Development Officer.

== Teams ==
Season	Skip	Third	Second	Lead	Events
2002–03	Darrell Ell	?	?	?	
2003–04	Kory Kohuch	Terry Hamilton	Darrell Ell	Merle Smith	
2004–05	Kory Kohuch	Terry Hamilton	Darrell Ell	Merle Smith	

== Record as a coach of national teams ==
Year	Tournament, event	National team	Place
1985	1985 European Curling Championships	Netherlands (men)	8
1985	1985 European Curling Championships	Netherlands (women)	11
1992	1992 European Curling Championships	Netherlands (men)	10
1992	1992 European Curling Championships	Netherlands (women)	12
2000	2000 European Curling Championships	Netherlands (men)	9
2003	2003 European Curling Championships	Hungary (men)	17
2003	2003 European Curling Championships	Hungary (women)	18
2004	2004 European Curling Championships	Hungary (men)	17
2004	2004 European Curling Championships	Hungary (women)	14
2005	2005 European Curling Championships	Hungary (men)	17
2005	2005 European Curling Championships	Hungary (women)	15
2006	2006 European Curling Championships	Hungary (men)	14
2006	2006 European Curling Championships	Hungary (women)	14
2007	2007 European Curling Championships	Hungary (women)	15
2008	2008 World Mixed Doubles Curling Championship	Hungary (mixed doubles)	9
2008	2008 European Curling Championships	Hungary (men)	13
2008	2008 European Curling Championships	Hungary (women)	13
2009	2009 World Mixed Doubles Curling Championship	Hungary (mixed doubles)	2nd place, silver medalist(s)
2010	2010 European Curling Championships	Hungary (women)	14
2011	2011 World Mixed Doubles Curling Championship	Hungary (mixed doubles)	10
