= 2005 European Mixed Curling Championship =

- Host city: Canillo, Andorra
- Arena: Canillo Ice Arena
- Dates: October 18–22, 2005
- Winner: Finland
- Skip: Markku Uusipaavalniemi
- Third: Kirsi Nykänen
- Second: Teemu Salo
- Lead: Tiina Kautonen
- Finalist: Sweden (Niklas Edin)

The inaugural 2005 European Mixed Curling Championship was held from October 18 to 22, 2005 at the Canillo Ice Arena in Canillo, Andorra.

Finland, skipped by Markku Uusipaavalniemi, won its first title, defeating Sweden in the final.

== Teams ==
The teams are as follows:

Country	Skip	Third	Second	Lead	Alternate(s)	Curling club
Andorra	Damaso Hernandez	Sara Pintat	Arnau Friguls	Cyrille Ferrandis	Enric Morral	
Croatia	Alen Cadez	Katarina Radonic	Ognjen Golubic	Zrinka Muhec		
Czech Republic	Karel Hradec	Jana Medricka	Marek Brozek	Tereza Mataskova	Vaclav Port, Eva Seifertová	
Denmark	Birthe Falk Hansen	Flemming Mortensen	Rachel Pedersen	Niels Thorbjørn Jørgensen		
England	Alan MacDougall	Joan Reed	Chris Robinson	Claire Grimwood	Forbes Fenton, Lorna Rettig	Glendale CC, Northumberland
Estonia	Martin Lill	Kristiine Lill	Jan Anderson	Anneli Sinirand	Ingar Mäesalu, Siret Voll	
Finland	Markku Uusipaavalniemi	Kirsi Nykänen	Teemu Salo	Tiina Kautonen		
France	Vianney Leudiere	Stephanie Jaccaz	Jean-Xavier Cheval	Julie Ducrot	Guillaume Despres, Joelle Perguet	
Germany	Rainer Schöpp	Andrea Schöpp	Helmar Erlewein	Monika Wagner		SC Riessersee, Garmisch-Partenkirchen
Hungary	Ildiko Szekeres (fourth)	György Nagy (skip)	Alexandra Béres	Krisztiàn Barna		
Ireland	Tony Tierney	Marie O'Kane	Jim Winning	Jane Moira Paterson		
Italy	Antonio Menardi	Claudia Alvera	Massimo Antonelli	Anna Ghiretti	Alberto Menardi, Giorgia Apollonio	
Latvia	Kārlis Smilga	Iveta Staša	Robert Krusts	Ieva Piksena	Janis Klive	
Luxembourg	Thomas Schröder	Isabelle Rueda	Bev Lawrence	Milena Messori	Marco Etienne	
Netherlands	Gerrit-Jan Scholten	Margreet Poost	Marco van Vliet	Alie Kramer	Jeroen Postma	
Poland	Arkadiusz Detyniecki	Marta Szeliga-Frynia	Pawel Frynia	Marianna Das	Agnieszka Czaplicka, Pawel Burlewicz coach: Pawel Burlewicz	
Russia	Alexander Kirikov	Margarita Fomina	Dmitri Abanin	Angela Tuvaeva	Alexey Kamnev, Ilona Grichina	
Scotland	Derek Brown	Cathryn Guthrie	Greig Smith	Rhona Brown		
Slovakia	Pavel Kocián	Barbora Bugarova	Ronald Krcmar	Katarina Langova		
Spain	Antonio De Mollinedo Gonzalez	Ellen Kittelsen	Pierre-Andr‚ Rouard	Ana Arce		
Sweden	Niklas Edin	Stina Viktorsson	Sebastian Kraupp	Anna Viktorsson		Sundbybergs CK
Switzerland	Roman Ruch	Karin Baumann	Romano Ruch	Anja Ruch	Niki Goridis, Manuel Ruch	
Wales	Peter Williams	Helen Lyon	Scott Lyon	Madzia Williams		

== Round Robin ==
In every group: two best teams to playoffs.

=== Group A ===
Place	Team	1	2	3	4	5	6	Wins	Losses
1	Czech Republic	*	5:2	5:4	11:6	11:5	12:4	5	0
2	Germany	2:5	*	10:3	13:2	12:3	13:5	4	1
3	France	4:5	3:10	*	4:10	16:2	12:2	3	2
4	Estonia	6:11	2:13	10:4	*	12:5	13:2	3	2
5	Denmark	5:11	3:12	2:16	5:12	*	13:3	1	4
6	Croatia	4:12	5:13	2:12	2:13	3:13	*	0	5

Teams to playoffs

=== Group B ===
Place	Team	1	2	3	4	5	6	Wins	Losses
1	Scotland	*	6:3	13:6	14:3	13:2	8:4	5	0
2	Russia	3:6	*	8:5	6:4	11:0	9:3	4	1
3	Ireland	6:13	5:8	*	4:13	9:3	8:6	2	3
4	Poland	3:14	4:6	13:4	*	5:10	9:6	2	3
5	Slovakia	2:13	0:11	3:9	10:5	*	4:5	1	4
6	Spain	4:8	3:9	6:8	6:9	5:4	*	1	4

Teams to playoffs

=== Group C ===
Place	Team	1	2	3	4	5	6	Wins	Losses
1	Sweden	*	6:8	6:2	4:3	15:0	6:4	4	1
2	Finland	8:6	*	4:3	3:9	13:2	12:0	4	1
3	Switzerland	2:6	3:4	*	10:3	10:5	10:3	3	2
4	Latvia	3:4	9:3	3:10	*	7:3	10:3	3	2
5	Netherlands	0:15	2:13	5:10	3:7	*	7:3	1	4
6	Luxembourg	4:6	0:12	3:10	3:10	3:7	*	0	5

Teams to playoffs

=== Group D ===
Place	Team	1	2	3	4	5	Wins	Losses
1	Italy	*	5:8	7:2	13:3	9:6	3	1
2	Hungary	8:5	*	4:9	12:2	9:3	3	1
3	England	2:7	9:4	*	7:5	7:2	3	1
4	Wales	3:13	2:12	5:7	*	11:1	2	2
5	Andorra	6:9	3:9	2:7	1:11	*	0	4

Team to playoffs
Teams to tie-break for 2nd place

==== Tie-break ====
Team	1	2	3	4	5	6	7	8	Final
England	1	0	1	0	2	1	0	0	5
Hungary	0	2	0	2	0	0	1	1	6

== Playoffs ==
Quarterfinals
A-1	Czech Republic	4
C-1	Sweden	6
B-1	Scotland	7
D-2	Hungary	6
C-2	Finland	7
B-2	Russia	4
D-1	Italy	4
A-2	Germany	6

Semifinals
Sweden	8
Scotland	2
Finland	5
Germany	3

Final
Sweden	4
Finland	6
Third place
Scotland	3
Germany	7

=== Quarterfinals ===
Team	1	2	3	4	5	6	7	8	Final
Czech Republic	0	1	0	0	2	1	0	0	4
Sweden	1	0	1	0	0	0	2	2	6

Team	1	2	3	4	5	6	7	8	Final
Scotland	0	1	0	1	3	0	2	0	7
Hungary	1	0	2	0	0	2	0	1	6

Team	1	2	3	4	5	6	7	8	9	Final
Finland	0	1	0	1	1	0	1	0	3	7
Russia	0	0	2	0	0	1	0	1	0	4

Team	1	2	3	4	5	6	7	8	9	Final
Italy	1	0	1	0	1	1	0	0	0	4
Germany	0	0	0	2	0	0	0	2	2	6

=== Semifinals ===
Team	1	2	3	4	5	6	7	8	Final
Scotland	0	0	0	1	0	1	0	0	2
Sweden	1	1	1	0	3	0	1	1	8

Team	1	2	3	4	5	6	7	8	Final
Finland	1	0	0	0	2	0	1	1	5
Germany	0	1	0	1	0	1	0	0	3

=== Bronze medal game ===
Team	1	2	3	4	5	6	7	8	Final
Scotland	0	1	0	1	0	1	0	0	3
Germany	1	0	1	0	1	0	2	2	7

=== Final ===
Sheet B	1	2	3	4	5	6	7	8	9	Final
Finland	0	0	1	0	1	0	2	0	2	6
Sweden	0	1	0	0	0	2	0	1	0	4

== Final standings ==
Place	Team	Games	Wins	Losses
1st place, gold medalist(s)	Finland	8	7	1
2nd place, silver medalist(s)	Sweden	8	6	2
3rd place, bronze medalist(s)	Germany	8	6	2
4	Scotland	8	6	2
5	Czech Republic	6	5	1
6	Russia	6	4	2
7	Italy	5	3	2
8	Hungary	6	4	2
9	Switzerland	5	3	2
10	Estonia	5	3	2
11	Latvia	5	3	2
12	England	5	3	2
13	France	5	2	3
14	Poland	5	2	3
15	Ireland	5	2	3
16	Spain	5	1	4
17	Denmark	5	1	4
18	Wales	4	1	3
19	Slovakia	5	1	4
20	Netherlands	5	1	4
21	Luxembourg	5	0	5
22	Croatia	5	0	5
23	Andorra	4	0	4

2005 European Mixed Curling Championship
(Finland)
Finland
1st title
