= György Nagy (curler) =

Hungarian male curler

- Curler
- Born: 2 January 1965 (age 61); Budapest, Hungary

Team
- Curling club: Vasas SC, Budapest
- Mixed doubles partner: Ildikó Szekeres

Curling career
- Member Association: Hungary
- World Mixed Doubles Championship: 6 (2008, 2009, 2011, 2012, 2018, 2022)
- European Championship: 8 (2003, 2004, 2005, 2006, 2008, 2011, 2012, 2015)
Medal record
Curling
Representing Hungary
World Mixed Doubles Championship
Silver medal – second place	2009 Cortina d'Ampezzo
European Mixed Championship
Bronze medal – third place	2013 Edinburgh

György Nagy (Hungarian: Nagy György; born 2 January 1965 in Budapest) is a Hungarian male curler.

On international level he is runner-up of 2009 World Mixed Doubles Curling Championship and bronze medallist of 2013 European Mixed Curling Championship.

On national level he is nine-time Hungarian men's curling champion (2003, 2004, 2005, 2006, 2008, 2011, 2012, 2015, 2016), six-time Hungarian mixed curling champion (2005, 2008, 2011, 2013, 2014, 2015), five-time Hungarian mixed doubles curling champion (2007, 2008, 2010, 2011, 2017), seven-time Hungarian Men's Curler of the Year (2005, 2007, 2009, 2011, 2013, 2014, 2018).

== Teams and events ==
=== Men's ===
Season	Skip	Third	Second	Lead	Alternate	Coach	Events
2002–03	György Nagy	Zsolt Victora	Krisztiàn Barna	Gàbor Bartalus	Balàzs Nèmeth		HMCC 2003 (gold)
2003–04	György Nagy	Zsolt Victora	Balàzs Nèmeth	Krisztiàn Barna	Gàbor Bartalus	Darrell Ell	ECC 2003 (17th)
2004–05	György Nagy	Balàzs Nèmeth	Gàbor Bartalus	Krisztiàn Barna		Darrell Ell	ECC 2004 (17th)
2005–06	György Nagy	Gàbor Bartalus	Balàzs Nèmeth	Krisztiàn Barna	Zoltàn Jakab	Darrell Ell	ECC 2005 (17th)
2006–07	György Nagy	Balàzs Nèmeth	Zoltàn Jakab	Krisztiàn Barna	Zsombor Rokusfalvy	Darrell Ell	ECC 2006 (14th)
2007–08	György Nagy	Balàzs Nèmeth	Zsombor Rokusfalvy	Krisztiàn Barna	Zoltàn Jakab		HMCC 2008 (gold)
2008–09	György Nagy	Zsombor Rokusfalvy	Balàzs Nèmeth	Zoltàn Jakab	Krisztiàn Barna	John Hamm, Darrell Ell	ECC 2008 (13th)
2009–10	György Nagy	Peter Sardy	Zsolt Kiss	Zoltàn Jakab			
2010–11	György Nagy	Peter Sardy	Zoltàn Jakab	Zsolt Kiss			
2010–11	György Nagy	Gabor Ezsöl	Krisztián Hall	Zoltàn Jakab	Zsolt Kiss, Pál Gazdagh		HMCC 2011 (gold)
2011–12	Krisztián Hall	György Nagy	Gabor Ezsöl	Lajos Belleli	Zsolt Kiss	Sune Frederiksen	ECC 2011 (12th)
2011–12	György Nagy	Gabor Ezsöl	Krisztián Hall	Lajos Belleli	Zsolt Kiss, Pál Gazdagh		HMCC 2012 (gold)
2012–13	Krisztián Hall	György Nagy	Gabor Ezsöl	Lajos Belleli	Zsolt Kiss	Sune Frederiksen	ECC 2012 (10th)
2014–15	Dávid Balázs	Gábor Bodor	Kristóf Czermann	Zoltán Jakab	Zsolt Kiss, György Nagy		HMCC 2015 (gold)
2015–16	Zsolt Kiss (fourth)	György Nagy (skip)	Zsombor Rokusfalvy	David Balazs	Gabor Bodor	Sune Frederiksen	ECC 2015 (20th)
2015–16	Zsolt Kiss	György Nagy	Kristóf Czermann	Dávid Balázs	Zsombor Rókusfalvy		HMCC 2016 (gold)

=== Mixed ===
Season	Skip	Third	Second	Lead	Alternate	Coach	Events
2004–05	György Nagy	Ildikó Szekeres	Alexandra Béres	Krisztiàn Barna			HMxCC 2005 (gold)
2005–06	Ildikó Szekeres (fourth)	György Nagy (skip)	Alexandra Béres	Krisztiàn Barna			EMxCC 2005 (8th)
2007–08	György Nagy	Ildikó Szekeres	Zsombor Rokusfalvy	Boglárka Ádám			HMxCC 2008 (gold)
2008–09	György Nagy	Ildikó Szekeres	Zsombor Rokusfalvy	Boglárka Ádám			EMxCC 2008 (8th)
2010–11	György Nagy	Ildikó Szekeres	Gabor Ezsöl	Orsolya Rokusfalvy	Zoltàn Jakab, Judit Nagy		HMxCC 2011 (gold)
2011–12	György Nagy	Ildikó Szekeres	Gabor Ezsöl	Orsolya Rokusfalvy	Csilla Halasz, Zoltàn Jakab	Joel Ostrowski	EMxCC 2011 (15th)
2012–13	György Nagy	Zsanett Gunzinam	Zsolt Kiss	Ágnes Szentannai	Monika Szarvas, Laszlo Kiss	Laszlo Kiss	EMxCC 2012 (12th)
2012–13	György Nagy	Ildikó Szekeres	Zsolt Kiss	Ágnes Szentannai	Gyöngyi Nagy, Kristóf Czermann		HMxCC 2013 (gold)
2013–14	György Nagy	Ildikó Szekeres	Zsolt Kiss	Ágnes Szentannai		Zoltàn Jakab, Gyöngyi Nagy (HMxCC)	EMxCC 2013 (bronze); HMxCC 2014 (gold)
2014–15	György Nagy	Ildikó Szekeres	Zsolt Kiss	Ágnes Szentannai		Zoltàn Jakab	EMxCC 2014 (5th)
2014–15	Zoltàn Jakab	Zsolt Kiss	Gyöngyi Nagy	György Nagy	Ildikó Szekeres, Ágnes Szentannai		HMxCC 2015 (gold)
2015–16	György Nagy	Ildikó Szekeres	Zsolt Kiss	Ágnes Szentannai		Zoltàn Jakab	WMxCC 2015 (9th)

=== Mixed doubles ===
Season	Male	Female	Coach	Events
2007–08	György Nagy	Ildikó Szekeres	Darrell Ell	WMDCC 2008 (9th)
2008–09	György Nagy	Ildikó Szekeres	Darrell Ell	WMDCC 2009 (silver)
2010–11	György Nagy	Ildikó Szekeres	Darrell Ell	WMDCC 2011 (10th)
2011–12	György Nagy	Ildikó Szekeres	Lajos Belleli	WMDCC 2012 (13th)
2017–18	György Nagy	Ildikó Szekeres	Darryl Horne	WMDCC 2018 (6th)
2020–21	György Nagy	Ildikó Szekeres		
2021–22	György Nagy	Ildikó Szekeres		
