= Zoltán Palancsa =

Hungarian male curler and curling coach (born 1963)

- Curler ♂
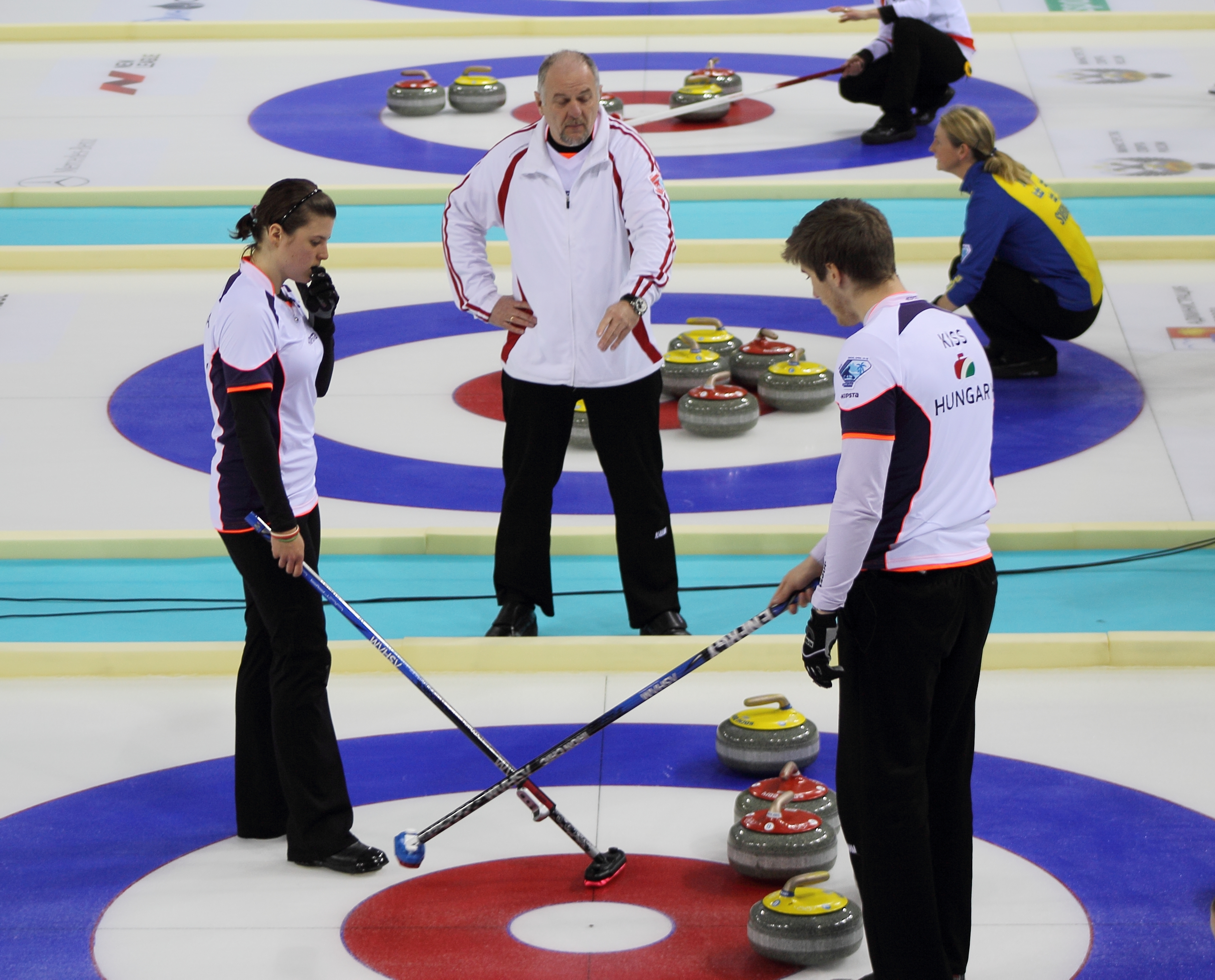
- from left to right: Dorottya Palancsa, Zoltán Palancsa and Zsolt Kiss at the 2015 World Mixed Doubles Curling Championship
- Born: 7 October 1963 (age 63); Nova, Zala County, Hungary

Curling career
- Member Association: Hungary
- Other appearances: World Mixed Championship: 1 (2018), World Senior Championships: 1 (2015)
Medal record
Curling

Zoltán Palancsa (born 7 October 1963) is a Hungarian male curler and curling coach.

== Teams and events ==
=== Men's ===
Season	Skip	Third	Second	Lead	Alternate	Events
2014–15	András Rokusfalvy (fourth)	Zoltan Palancsa (skip)	Janos Miklai	Gyorgy Kalmar	Mihaly Veraszto	WSCC 2015 (18th)

=== Mixed ===
Season	Skip	Third	Second	Lead	Alternate	Events
2018–19	Dorottya Palancsa (fourth)	Zoltan Palancsa (skip)	Henrietta Miklai	János Miklai	Peter Palancsa	WMxCC 2018 (24th)

== Record as a coach of national teams ==
Year	Tournament, event	National team	Place
2012	2012 European Junior Curling Challenge	Hungary (junior men)	15
2013	2013 World Mixed Doubles Curling Championship	Hungary (mixed doubles)	1st place, gold medalist(s)
2014	2014 World Mixed Doubles Curling Championship	Hungary (mixed doubles)	4
2014	2014 European Curling Championships	Hungary (women)	12
2015	2015 World Mixed Doubles Curling Championship	Hungary (mixed doubles)	1st place, gold medalist(s)
2015	2015 European Curling Championships	Hungary (women)	10
2016	2016 World Junior Curling Championships	Hungary (junior women)	4
2016	2016 World Mixed Doubles Curling Championship	Hungary (mixed doubles)	13
2016	2016 European Curling Championships	Hungary (women)	11
2017	2017 World Mixed Doubles Curling Championship	Hungary (mixed doubles)	13
2017	2017 European Curling Championships	Hungary (women)	10
2018	2018 European Curling Championships	Hungary (women)	15
2019	2019 World Mixed Doubles Curling Championship	Hungary (mixed doubles)	9
2019	2019 European Curling Championships	Hungary (women)	13

== Personal life ==
His children are also a curlers: daughter Dorottya is a two-time World Mixed Doubles champion curler, son Peter is a curler and coach.
