= Marie Persson =

Swedish female curler

- Curler ♀
- Born: 28 May 1967 (age 59)

Team
- Curling club: Sundbybergs CK, Sundbyberg, Magnus Ladulås CK, Amatörföreningens CK, Stockholm

Curling career
- Member Association: Sweden
- World Mixed Doubles Championship: 1 (2008)
- Other appearances: European Mixed Championship: 1 (2011)
Medal record
Curling
World Mixed Doubles Curling Championship
Bronze medal – third place	2008 Vierumäki
Swedish Mixed Doubles Curling Championship
Gold medal – first place	2008
Silver medal – second place	2009

Marie Persson (born 28 May 1967) is a Swedish female curler.

She is a 2008 World Mixed Doubles bronze medallist and a 2008 Swedish mixed doubles curling champion.

In 2009 she was inducted into the Swedish Curling Hall of Fame.

== Teams ==
=== Mixed ===
Season	Skip	Third	Second	Lead	Events
2011–12	Göran Carlsson	Marie Persson	Anders Eriksson	Hanna Maleus Larsson	EMxCC 2011 (19th)

=== Mixed doubles ===
Season	Male	Female	Coach	Events
2007–08	Göran Carlsson	Marie Persson	Magnus Ekdahl	SMDCC 2008 (gold); WMDCC 2008 (bronze)
2008–09	Göran Carlsson	Marie Persson		SMDCC 2009 (silver)
