= Göran Carlsson =

Swedish male curler

- Curler ♂
- Born: 12 December 1963 (age 62)

Team
- Curling club: Norrköpings CK, Norrköping, Linköpings CK, Linköping

Curling career
- Member Association: Sweden
- World Mixed Doubles Championship: 1 (2008)
- Other appearances: European Mixed Championship: 1 (2011)
Medal record
Curling
World Mixed Doubles Curling Championship
Bronze medal – third place	2008 Vierumäki
Swedish Men's Championship
Silver medal – second place	2015
Swedish Mixed Doubles Curling Championship
Gold medal – first place	2008
Silver medal – second place	2009

Claes Göran Carlsson (born 12 December 1963) is a Swedish curler.

He is a 2008 World Mixed Doubles bronze medallist and a 2008 Swedish mixed doubles curling champion.

== Teams ==
=== Men's ===
Season	Skip	Third	Second	Lead	Alternate	Coach	Events
2005–06	Anders Eriksson	Göran Carlsson	Morgan Bergkvist	Conny Ljungqvist			
2008–09	Göran Carlsson	Magnus Ekdahl	Morgan Bergkvist	Conny Ljungqvist			
2009–10	Göran Carlsson	Marcus Hasselborg	Peder Folke	Anton Sandström			
2010–11	Marcus Hasselborg	Peder Folke	Göran Carlsson	Anton Sandström			
2011–12	Göran Carlsson	Anders Eriksson	Albin Eriksson	Nils Sollerud	Petter Berg		
2012–13	Göran Carlsson	Albin Eriksson	Niklas Westerberg	Hugo Eriksson			
2014–15	K-G Pettersson	Ulf Johansson	Håkan Nyberg	Rickard Eriksson	Göran Carlsson		SMCC 2015 (silver)
2014–15	K-G Pettersson	Göran Carlsson	Rickard Eriksson	Ulf Johansson	Hasse Stenström		SSCC 2015 (5th)
2015–16	K-G Pettersson	Hans Stenström	Göran Carlsson	Håkan Nyberg	Ulf Johansson, Rickard Eriksson		SSCC 2016 (5th)
2016–17	Göran Carlsson	Håkan Nyberg	Rickard Eriksson	Ulf Johansson	Magnus Ekdahl, Johan Sundberg	K-G Pettersson	SMCC 2017 (5th)
2016–17	K-G Pettersson	Göran Carlsson	Rickard Eriksson	Håkan Nyberg	Ulf Johansson, Hans Stenström		SSCC 2017 (bronze)
2017–18	K-G Pettersson	Göran Carlsson	Håkan Nyberg	Ulf Johansson	Rickard Eriksson		
2018–19	Göran Carlsson	Håkan Nyberg	Hans Stenström	Rickard Eriksson			SMCC 2019 (7th)

=== Mixed ===
Season	Skip	Third	Second	Lead	Events
2011–12	Göran Carlsson	Marie Persson	Anders Eriksson	Hanna Maleus Larsson	EMxCC 2011 (19th)

=== Mixed doubles ===
Season	Male	Female	Coach	Events
2007–08	Göran Carlsson	Marie Persson	Magnus Ekdahl	SMDCC 2008 (gold); WMDCC 2008 (bronze)
2008–09	Göran Carlsson	Marie Persson		SMDCC 2009 (silver)
2013–14	Göran Carlsson	Marie Persson		SMDCC 2014 (5th)
