= Zsolt Kiss (curler) =

Hungarian male curler

- Curler
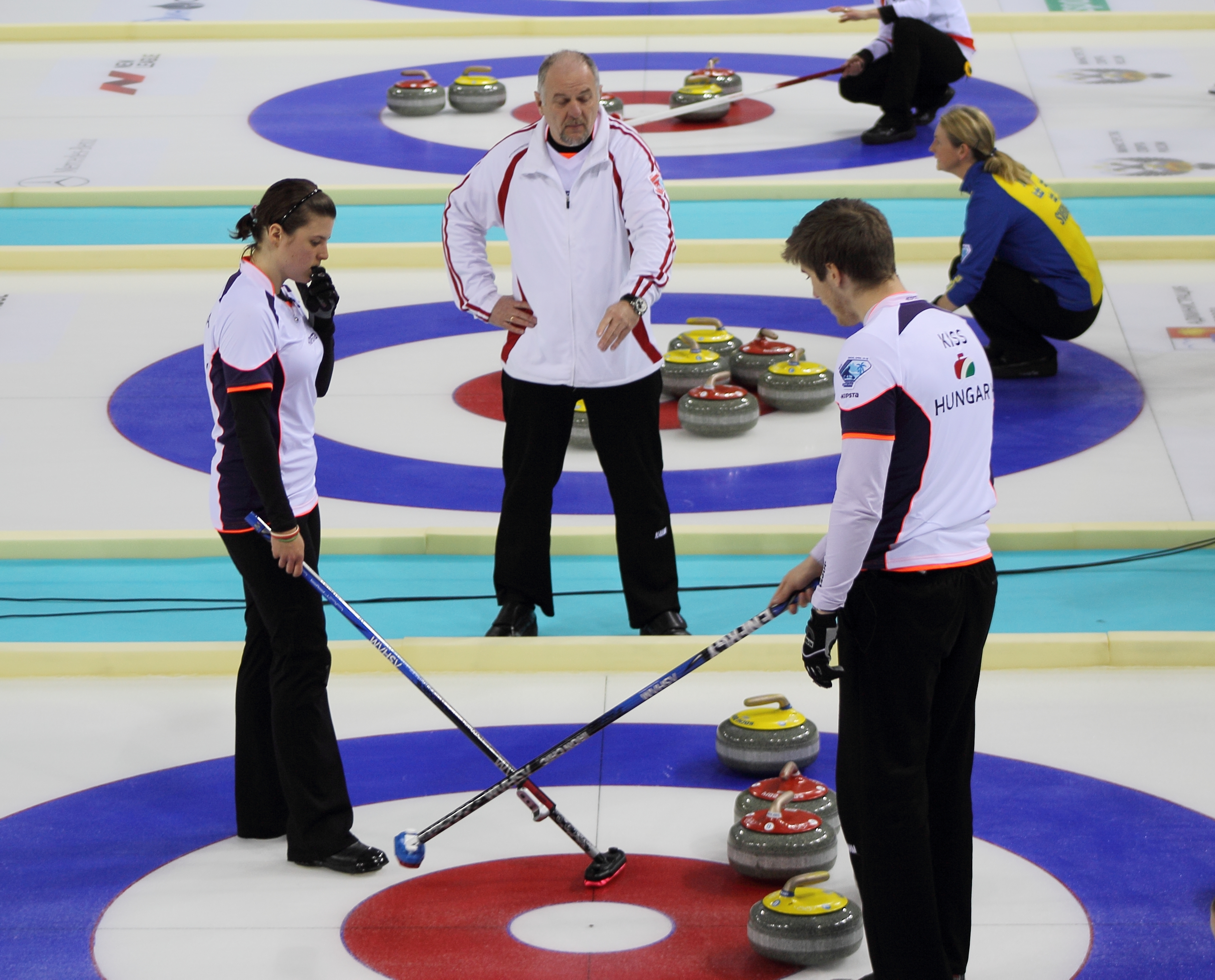
- Born: 29 March 1989 (age 37); Budapest, Hungary

Team
- Curling club: UTE, Budapest
- Mixed doubles partner: Dorottya Palancsa

Curling career
- Member Association: Hungary
- World Mixed Doubles Championship: 7 (2013, 2014, 2015, 2016, 2017, 2019, 2021)
- European Championship: 5 (2011, 2012, 2015, 2018, 2022)
Medal record
Curling
Representing Hungary
World Mixed Doubles Championship
Gold medal – first place	2013 Fredericton
Gold medal – first place	2015 Sochi
European Mixed Championship
Bronze medal – third place	2013 Edinburgh

Zsolt Kiss (Hungarian: Kiss Zsolt; born 29 March 1989 in Budapest) is a Hungarian male curler.

On the international level, he is a two-time World mixed doubles curling champion (2013 and 2015).

On the national level he is six-time Hungarian men's curling champion (2011, 2012, 2015, 2016, 2018 and 2020), six-time Hungarian mixed curling champion (2012, 2013, 2014, 2015, 2016 and 2018), eight-time Hungarian mixed doubles curling champion (2012, 2013, 2014, 2015, 2016, 2018, 2020 and 2021), one-time Hungarian junior men's curling champion (2009) and four-time Hungarian Men's Curler of the Year (2012, 2015, 2016 and 2017).

== Teams and events ==
=== Men's ===
Season	Skip	Third	Second	Lead	Alternate	Coach	Events
2005–06	Krisztián Hall	Zsombor Rokusfalvy	Dávid Huszlicska	Zsolt Kiss		András Rokusfalvy	EJCC 2006 (7th)
2008–09	Zsolt Kiss	Kristóf Magyar	Zsolt Szalay				HJMCC 2009 (gold)
2010–11	György Nagy	Gabor Ezsöl	Krisztián Hall	Zoltàn Jakab	Zsolt Kiss, Pál Gazdagh		HMCC 2011 (gold)
2011–12	Krisztián Hall	György Nagy	Gabor Ezsöl	Lajos Belleli	Zsolt Kiss	Sune Frederiksen	ECC 2011 (12th)
2011–12	György Nagy	Gabor Ezsöl	Krisztián Hall	Lajos Belleli	Zsolt Kiss, Pál Gazdagh		HMCC 2012 (gold)
2012–13	Krisztián Hall	György Nagy	Gabor Ezsöl	Lajos Belleli	Zsolt Kiss	Sune Frederiksen	ECC 2012 (10th)
2014–15	Dávid Balázs	Gábor Bodor	Kristóf Czermann	Zoltán Jakab	Zsolt Kiss, György Nagy		HMCC 2015 (gold)
2015–16	Zsolt Kiss (fourth)	György Nagy (skip)	Zsombor Rokusfalvy	David Balazs	Gabor Bodor	Sune Frederiksen	ECC 2015 (20th)
2015–16	Zsolt Kiss	György Nagy	Kristóf Czermann	Dávid Balázs	Zsombor Rókusfalvy		HMCC 2016 (gold)
2017–18	Zsolt Kiss	Kristóf Czermann	Dávid Balázs	Kristóf Szarvas	Lőrinc Tatár		HMCC 2018 (gold)
2018–19	Zsolt Kiss	Kristóf Czermann	Dávid Balázs	Lőrinc Tatár	Kristóf Szarvas	Agnes Szentannai	ECC 2018 (19th)
2019–20	Zsolt Kiss	Kristóf Czermann	Dávid Balázs	Lőrinc Tatár	Kristóf Szarvas		
2020-21	Zsolt Kiss	Kristof Czermann	Dávid Balázs	Callum Macfarlane	Viktor Nagy	David Wills	
2021-22	Zsolt Kiss	Kristof Czermann	Dávid Balázs	Callum Macfarlane	Lőrinc Tatár, Ottó Kalocsay	András Rokusfalvy	

=== Mixed ===
Season	Skip	Third	Second	Lead	Alternate	Coach	Events
2011–12	Laszlo Kiss	Zsanett Gunzinam	Zsolt Kiss	Agnes Szentannai	Monika Szarvas, Kristóf Czermann		HMxCC 2012 (gold)
2012–13	György Nagy	Zsanett Gunzinam	Zsolt Kiss	Agnes Szentannai	Monika Szarvas, Laszlo Kiss	Laszlo Kiss	EMxCC 2012 (12th)
2012–13	György Nagy	Ildikó Szekeres	Zsolt Kiss	Agnes Szentannai	Gyöngyi Nagy, Kristóf Czermann		HMxCC 2013 (gold)
2013–14	György Nagy	Ildikó Szekeres	Zsolt Kiss	Agnes Szentannai		Zoltàn Jakab, Gyöngyi Nagy (HMxCC)	EMxCC 2013 (bronze); HMxCC 2014 (gold)
2014–15	György Nagy	Ildikó Szekeres	Zsolt Kiss	Agnes Szentannai		Zoltàn Jakab	EMxCC 2014 (5th)
2014–15	Zoltàn Jakab	Zsolt Kiss	Gyöngyi Nagy	György Nagy	Ildikó Szekeres, Agnes Szentannai		HMxCC 2015 (gold)
2015–16	György Nagy	Ildikó Szekeres	Zsolt Kiss	Agnes Szentannai		Zoltàn Jakab	WMxCC 2015 (9th)
2015–16	Agnes Szentannai	Dorottya Palancsa	Kristóf Czermann	Zsolt Kiss			HMxCC 2016 (gold)
2016–17	Zsolt Kiss	Dorottya Palancsa	Kristof Czermann	Agnes Szentannai			WMxCC 2016 (9th)
2017–18	Agnes Szentannai	Orsolya Toth-Csoesz	Dávid Balázs	Zsolt Kiss			HMxCC 2018 (gold)

=== Mixed doubles ===
Season	Male	Female	Coach	Events
2012–13	Zsolt Kiss	Dorottya Palancsa	Zoltan Palancsa	WMDCC 2013 (gold)
2013–14	Zsolt Kiss	Dorottya Palancsa	Zoltan Palancsa	WMDCC 2014 (4th)
2014–15	Zsolt Kiss	Dorottya Palancsa	Zoltan Palancsa	WMDCC 2015 (gold)
2015–16	Zsolt Kiss	Dorottya Palancsa	Zoltan Palancsa	WMDCC 2016 (13th)
2016–17	Zsolt Kiss	Dorottya Palancsa	Zoltan Palancsa	WMDCC 2017 (13th)
2018–19	Zsolt Kiss	Dorottya Palancsa	Zoltan Palancsa	WMDCC 2019 (9th)
2019–20	Zsolt Kiss	Dorottya Palancsa		
2020–21	Zsolt Kiss	Dorottya Palancsa	David Thomas Wills	WMDCC 2021 (15th)
2021-22	Zsolt Kiss	Dorottya Palancsa	Zoltan Palancsa	
