= Lajos Belleli =

Hungarian male curler and curling coach

- Curler
- Born: 22 July 1977 (age 49)

Team
- Curling club: Westbay SC, Budapest, COOL CC, Budapest

Curling career
- Member Association: Hungary; Qatar
- European Championship: 7 (2007, 2009, 2010, 2011, 2012, 2013, 2014)
Medal record
Curling

Lajos Belleli (born 22 July 1977) is a Hungarian male curler and curling coach.

He is six-time Hungarian men's curling champion (2007, 2009, 2010, 2012, 2013, 2014) and Hungarian Men's Curler of the Year (2010).

== Teams and events ==
| Season | Skip | Third | Second | Lead | Alternate | Coach | Events |
|---|---|---|---|---|---|---|---|
| 2006–07 | Lajos Belleli | Gabor Riesz | Gabor Ezsöl | Jozsef Nyitrai | Olivér Kerekes | | HMCC 2007 (gold) |
| 2007–08 | Gabor Riesz | Lajos Belleli | Gabor Ezsöl | Jozsef Nyitrai | András Rokusfalvy | Rainer Schöpp | ECC 2007 (16th) |
| 2008–09 | Lajos Belleli | Gabor Riesz | András Rokusfalvy | Jozsef Nyitrai | Gabor Molnar | | HMCC 2009 (gold) |
| 2009–10 | Lajos Belleli | Gabor Riesz | Zsombor Rokusfalvy | Gabor Molnar | András Rokusfalvy | Sebastian Jacoby | ECC 2009 (13th) |
| 2009–10 | Lajos Belleli | Gabor Riesz | András Rokusfalvy | Zsombor Rokusfalvy | Gabor Molnar | | HMCC 2010 (gold) |
| 2010–11 | Gabor Riesz | Lajos Belleli | Krisztián Hall | Gabor Molnar | András Rokusfalvy | Rainer Schöpp, Sebastian Jacoby | ECC 2010 (23rd) |
| 2011–12 | Krisztián Hall | György Nagy | Gabor Ezsöl | Lajos Belleli | Zsolt Kiss | Sune Frederiksen | ECC 2011 (12th) |
| 2011–12 | György Nagy | Gabor Ezsöl | Krisztián Hall | Lajos Belleli | Zsolt Kiss, Pál Gazdagh | | HMCC 2012 (gold) |
| 2012–13 | Krisztián Hall | György Nagy | Gabor Ezsöl | Lajos Belleli | Zsolt Kiss | Sune Frederiksen | ECC 2012 (10th) |
| 2012–13 | Krisztián Hall | Gabor Ezsöl | Lajos Belleli | Balázs Varga | Zoltán Pünkösti | | HMCC 2013 (gold) |
| 2013–14 | Gabor Ezsöl | Lajos Belleli | Krisztián Hall | Balazs Varga | Tamás Vaspöri | | ECC 2013 (13th) |
| 2013–14 | Krisztián Hall | Gabor Ezsöl | Lajos Belleli | Balázs Varga | József Nyitrai, Tamás Vaspöri | | HMCC 2014 (gold) |
| 2014–15 | Krisztián Hall | Gabor Ezsöl | Lajos Belleli | Jozsef Nyitrai | Balazs Foti | Tamás Vaspöri | ECC 2014 (14th) |

== Record as a coach of national teams ==
| Year | Tournament, event | National team | Place |
|---|---|---|---|
| 2012 | 2012 World Mixed Doubles Curling Championship | Hungary (mixed doubles) | 13 |
| 2016 | 2016 World Mixed Doubles Curling Championship | Qatar (mixed doubles) | 42 |
| 2016 | 2016 Pacific-Asia Curling Championships | Qatar (men) | 9 |
| 2016 | 2016 Pacific-Asia Curling Championships | Qatar (women) | 8 |
| 2017 | 2017 Asian Winter Games | Qatar (men) | 6 |
| 2017 | 2017 Asian Winter Games | Qatar (women) | 5 |
| 2017 | 2017 Pacific-Asia Curling Championships | Qatar (men) | 8 |
| 2018 | 2018 Pacific-Asia Curling Championships | Qatar (men) | 9 |
| 2018 | 2018 Pacific-Asia Curling Championships | Qatar (women) | 7 |
| 2019 | 2019 World Mixed Doubles Curling Championship | Qatar (mixed doubles) | 42 |
| 2019 | 2019 Pacific-Asia Curling Championships | Qatar (men) | 7 |
| 2019 | 2019 Pacific-Asia Curling Championships | Qatar (women) | 8 |
