= 2009 World Mixed Doubles Curling Championship =

Curling tournament in Cortina d'Ampezzo, Italy

- Host city: Cortina d'Ampezzo, Italy
- Arena: Cortina d'Ampezzo Curling Arena
- Dates: April 18–25, 2009
- Winner: Switzerland
- Second: Irene Schori
- Lead: Toni Müller
- Finalist: Hungary

The 2009 World Mixed Doubles Curling Championship was held April 18–25, 2009 in Cortina d'Ampezzo, Italy at the Cortina d'Ampezzo Curling Arena.

== Teams ==
=== Blue group ===
Austria	Czech Republic	France
Second: Andreas Unterberger; Lead: Karina Toth	Second: Karel Kubeska; Lead: Anna Kubeskova	Second: Wilfrid Coulot; Lead: Solène Coulot
Japan	Latvia	Poland
Second: Ohno Fukihiro; Lead: Matsuda Atsuko	Second: Robert Krusts; Lead: Iveta Staša-Šaršūne	Second: Damian Herman; Lead: Agnieszka Ogrodniczek
Slovakia	Switzerland	Wales
Second: Milan Kajan; Lead: Gabriela Kajanova	Second: Toni Müller; Lead: Irene Schori	Second: Stewart Cairns; Lead: Lisa Peters

=== Red group ===
Australia	Bulgaria	Canada
Second: Gerald Chick; Lead: Jennifer Thomas	Second: Lubomir Velinov; Lead: Borislava Petrova	Second: Sean Grassie; Lead: Allison Nimik
England	Finland	Italy
Second: John Sharp; Lead: Jane Clark	Second: Jussi Uusipaavalniemi; Lead: Jaana Hämäläinen	Second: Andrea Pilzer; Lead: Chiara Zanotelli
New Zealand	Russia	Scotland
Second: Scott Becker; Lead: Brydie Donald	Second: Alexander Kirikov; Lead: Olga Jarkova	Second: Keith MacLennan; Lead: Victoria Sloan

=== Green group ===
China	Denmark	Estonia
Second: Zhang Zhipeng; Lead: Sun Yue	Second: Per Svensen; Lead: Christine Svensen	Second: Martin Lill; Lead: Kristiine Lill
Hungary	South Korea	Norway
Second: Ildiko Szekeres; Lead: György Nagy	Second: Hong Jun-pyo; Lead: Park Kyung-mi	Second: Ole Hauge; Lead: Hilde Stenseth
Spain	Sweden	United States
Second: Alberto Vez; Lead: Estrella Labrador	Second: Andreas Prytz; Lead: Sofia Gustafsson	Second: Brady Clark; Lead: Cristin Clark

== Round robin ==
Blue group			Red group			Green group		
Country	W	L	Country	W	L	Country	W	L
Switzerland	8	0	Canada	8	0	China	7	1
Czech Republic	6	2	Finland	7	1	Hungary	6	2
Poland	6	2	Scotland	6	2	Sweden	6	2
Latvia	4	4	Russia	4	4	Estonia	4	4
France	4	4	New Zealand	4	4	Denmark	4	4
Japan	3	5	Italy	3	5	United States	3	5
Austria	3	5	England	2	6	South Korea	3	5
Slovakia	2	6	Australia	2	6	Norway	2	6
Wales	0	8	Bulgaria	0	8	Spain	1	7

== Results ==
=== Blue group ===
==== April 19 ====
08:00

Sheet A	1	2	3	4	5	6	7	8	Final
Switzerland	1	0	0	1	1	1	1	2	7
Czech Republic	0	3	1	0	0	0	0	0	4

Sheet B	1	2	3	4	5	6	7	8	Final
Latvia	0	2	1	1	0	1	1	3	9
France	1	0	0	0	2	0	0	0	3

Sheet C	1	2	3	4	5	6	7	8	Final
Poland	0	5	0	1	1	1	0	1	9
Japan	3	0	1	0	0	0	3	0	7

Sheet D	1	2	3	4	5	6	7	8	Final
Wales	0	0	1	1	0	3	1	0	6
Slovakia	3	3	0	0	1	0	0	1	8

16:00

Sheet C	1	2	3	4	5	6	7	8	Final
Austria	1	0	0	3	0	2	1	1	8
Slovakia	0	2	1	0	1	0	0	0	4

Sheet D	1	2	3	4	5	6	7	8	Final
Czech Republic	0	1	1	0	2	2	0	4	10
France	3	0	0	2	0	0	1	0	6

Sheet D	1	2	3	4	5	6	7	8	Final
Poland	2	3	1	0	1	1	X	X	8
Wales	0	0	0	1	0	0	X	X	1

17:45

Sheet A	1	2	3	4	5	6	7	8	Final
Latvia	1	1	1	0	0	0	0	3	6
Japan	0	0	0	2	1	1	1	0	5

==== April 20 ====
08:00

Sheet A	1	2	3	4	5	6	7	8	Final
France	0	2	0	3	1	0	1	0	7
Slovakia	1	0	1	0	0	1	0	1	4

Sheet B	1	2	3	4	5	6	7	8	Final
Czech Republic	0	0	1	2	2	0	0	0	5
Japan	1	1	0	0	0	1	4	1	8

Sheet C	1	2	3	4	5	6	7	8	Final
Switzerland	1	0	1	0	5	1	2	X	10
Wales	0	3	0	1	0	0	0	X	4

14:30

Sheet B	1	2	3	4	5	6	7	8	Final
Switzerland	1	1	1	1	1	1	1	X	7
Poland	0	0	0	0	0	0	0	X	0

Sheet C	1	2	3	4	5	6	7	8	Final
France	3	0	2	1	2	0	1	0	9
Austria	0	4	0	0	0	2	0	1	7

Sheet D	1	2	3	4	5	6	7	8	Final
Latvia	3	0	2	2	1	0	X	X	8
Wales	0	2	0	0	0	1	X	X	3

Sheet E	1	2	3	4	5	6	7	8	Final
Czech Republic	1	1	1	0	3	0	0	1	7
Slovakia	0	0	0	1	0	1	1	0	3

21:00

Sheet D	1	2	3	4	5	6	7	8	9	Final
Poland	0	1	2	1	0	1	0	0	2	7
Austria	1	0	0	0	2	0	1	1	0	5

==== April 21 ====
08:00

Sheet E	1	2	3	4	5	6	7	8	9	Final
France	1	1	1	0	0	2	0	2	0	7
Switzerland	0	0	0	4	1	0	2	0	2	9

11:15

Sheet A	1	2	3	4	5	6	7	8	Final
Austria	0	1	0	2	0	2	3	X	8
Czech Republic	4	0	1	0	5	0	0	X	10

Sheet C	1	2	3	4	5	6	7	8	Final
Latvia	2	0	0	1	0	1	0	X	4
Poland	0	3	1	0	2	0	1	X	7

14:30

Sheet B	1	2	3	4	5	6	7	8	Final
Japan	2	0	0	0	4	0	3	1	10
Wales	0	1	1	2	0	4	0	0	8

Sheet D	1	2	3	4	5	6	7	8	Final
Slovakia	0	0	3	0	1	0	0	1	5
Switzerland	1	1	0	3	0	1	1	0	7

17:45

Sheet B	1	2	3	4	5	6	7	8	Final
Australia	1	1	0	0	2	0	3	2	9
Latvia	0	0	2	2	0	1	0	0	5

21:00

Sheet A	1	2	3	4	5	6	7	8	Final
Japan	4	0	1	0	0	1	0	X	6
France	0	5	0	2	2	0	5	X	14

Sheet C	1	2	3	4	5	6	7	8	Final
Wales	0	1	1	0	1	0	0	X	3
Czech Republic	2	0	0	3	0	2	1	X	8

==== April 22 ====
08:00

Sheet B	1	2	3	4	5	6	7	8	Final
Slovakia	0	0	2	0	3	0	0	X	5
Poland	1	2	0	2	0	2	2	X	9

Sheet D	1	2	3	4	5	6	7	8	Final
Switzerland	0	3	0	5	0	0	2	X	10
Latvia	1	0	1	0	2	1	0	X	5

11:15

Sheet B	1	2	3	4	5	6	7	8	Final
Wales	1	0	0	0	0	1	0	X	2
Austria	0	1	1	1	1	0	1	X	5

14:30

Sheet C	1	2	3	4	5	6	7	8	Final
Japan	0	3	0	0	0	0	3	0	6
Switzerland	1	0	2	1	1	2	0	1	8

17:45

Sheet E	1	2	3	4	5	6	7	8	Final
Wales	1	0	1	0	1	0	X	X	3
France	0	2	0	3	0	4	X	X	9

21:00

Sheet B	1	2	3	4	5	6	7	8	Final
Poland	0	0	0	1	0	2	1	X	4
Czech Republic	4	1	1	0	2	0	0	X	8

Sheet C	1	2	3	4	5	6	7	8	Final
Slovakia	0	0	2	1	0	0	0	2	5
Latvia	2	1	0	0	2	1	1	0	7

Sheet E	1	2	3	4	5	6	7	8	Final
Japan	0	3	1	1	0	2	2	X	9
Australia	1	0	0	0	3	0	0	X	4

==== April 23 ====
11:15

Sheet A	1	2	3	4	5	6	7	8	Final
Austria	0	1	0	2	0	2	0	X	5
Switzerland	1	0	1	0	2	0	4	X	8

Sheet B	1	2	3	4	5	6	7	8	9	Final
Slovakia	0	1	1	1	1	0	2	0	1	7
Japan	1	0	0	0	0	2	0	3	0	6

Sheet D	1	2	3	4	5	6	7	8	Final
France	2	0	0	1	2	0	0	X	5
Poland	0	2	1	0	0	4	3	X	10

Sheet E	1	2	3	4	5	6	7	8	9	Final
Czech Republic	0	1	2	0	4	0	0	0	1	8
Latvia	2	0	0	1	0	2	1	1	0	7

=== Red group ===
==== April 19 ====
11:15

Sheet A	1	2	3	4	5	6	7	8	Final
Finland	0	2	0	1	0	1	0	X	4
Canada	2	0	4	0	2	0	1	X	9

Sheet B	1	2	3	4	5	6	7	8	9	Final
New Zealand	0	0	2	0	2	0	1	0	1	6
Italy	1	1	0	1	0	1	0	1	0	5

Sheet C	1	2	3	4	5	6	7	8	Final
Australia	0	0	0	0	1	2	1	X	4
Scotland	1	2	2	3	0	0	0	X	8

Sheet D	1	2	3	4	5	6	7	8	Final
England	2	2	0	2	0	2	0	1	9
Russia	0	0	4	0	5	0	1	0	10

17:45

Sheet C	1	2	3	4	5	6	7	8	Final
Bulgaria	0	1	0	0	0	0	X	X	1
Russia	3	0	4	3	4	1	X	X	15

Sheet D	1	2	3	4	5	6	7	8	Final
Canada	0	1	0	2	1	0	3	X	7
Italy	1	0	2	0	0	1	0	X	4

Sheet E	1	2	3	4	5	6	7	8	Final
Australia	1	2	0	0	1	0	0	1	5
Netherlands	0	0	2	1	0	3	1	0	7

21:00

Sheet A	1	2	3	4	5	6	7	8	Final
New Zealand	0	0	0	0	1	0	1	X	2
Scotland	1	2	2	1	0	1	0	X	7

==== April 20 ====
11:15

Sheet A	1	2	3	4	5	6	7	8	Final
Italy	0	4	1	0	0	0	1	0	6
Russia	4	0	0	2	1	1	0	1	9

Sheet B	1	2	3	4	5	6	7	8	Final
Canada	0	1	0	1	0	1	3	X	6
Scotland	1	0	1	0	1	0	0	X	3

Sheet C	1	2	3	4	5	6	7	8	Final
Finland	3	1	1	1	2	0	1	X	9
England	0	0	0	0	0	2	0	X	2

17:45

Sheet B	1	2	3	4	5	6	7	8	Final
Finland	1	2	0	2	2	0	2	X	9
Australia	0	0	2	0	0	1	0	X	3

Sheet C	1	2	3	4	5	6	7	8	Final
Italy	0	4	2	0	1	0	3	X	10
Bulgaria	1	0	0	1	0	3	0	X	5

Sheet D	1	2	3	4	5	6	7	8	Final
New Zealand	1	0	0	3	1	0	0	2	7
England	0	2	1	0	0	1	1	0	5

Sheet E	1	2	3	4	5	6	7	8	9	Final
Canada	1	0	2	0	1	0	2	0	1	7
Russia	0	3	0	1	0	1	0	1	0	6

==== April 21 ====
8:00

Sheet B	1	2	3	4	5	6	7	8	Final
Scotland	0	1	2	2	5	1	X	X	11
England	1	0	0	0	0	0	X	X	1

Sheet D	1	2	3	4	5	6	7	8	Final
Australia	2	0	1	1	0	3	0	X	7
Bulgaria	0	1	0	0	2	0	1	X	4

11:15

Sheet E	1	2	3	4	5	6	7	8	Final
Italy	1	0	1	1	0	1	0	0	4
Finland	0	1	0	0	3	0	2	1	7

14:30

Sheet A	1	2	3	4	5	6	7	8	Final
Bulgaria	0	1	0	1	0	1	X	X	3
Canada	4	0	4	0	2	0	X	X	10

Sheet C	1	2	3	4	5	6	7	8	Final
New Zealand	1	0	1	1	0	5	0	X	8
Australia	0	3	0	0	1	0	1	X	5

17:45

Sheet D	1	2	3	4	5	6	7	8	Final
Russia	2	1	0	0	2	0	0	1	6
Finland	0	0	1	1	0	4	0	0	7

21:00

Sheet B	1	2	3	4	5	6	7	8	Final
Bulgaria	0	1	1	1	0	0	1	X	4
New Zealand	3	0	0	0	1	1	0	X	5

Sheet E	1	2	3	4	5	6	7	8	Final
England	0	0	1	0	2	0	0	X	3
Italy	2	1	0	3	0	3	1	X	10

==== April 22 ====
11:15

Sheet A	1	2	3	4	5	6	7	8	Final
Scotland	0	2	0	1	3	2	0	X	8
Italy	3	0	1	0	0	0	1	X	5

Sheet C	1	2	3	4	5	6	7	8	Final
England	0	0	1	0	2	2	1	X	6
Canada	3	3	0	3	0	0	0	0	9

Sheet D	1	2	3	4	5	6	7	8	Final
Finland	0	3	0	1	0	4	0	1	9
New Zealand	3	0	1	0	2	0	2	0	8

17:45

Sheet A	1	2	3	4	5	6	7	8	Final
Russia	0	0	0	2	1	0	1	0	4
Australia	1	1	2	0	0	2	0	1	7

Sheet B	1	2	3	4	5	6	7	8	Final
England	2	0	4	1	0	2	X	X	9
Bulgaria	0	1	0	0	1	0	X	X	2

Sheet C	1	2	3	4	5	6	7	8	Final
Scotland	2	0	0	0	2	1	0	0	5
Finland	0	1	1	1	0	0	3	2	8

==== April 23 ====
8:00

Sheet B	1	2	3	4	5	6	7	8	Final
Australia	0	1	0	1	0	3	0	X	5
Canada	1	0	3	0	2	0	3	X	9

Sheet C	1	2	3	4	5	6	7	8	Final
Russia	1	0	4	1	3	0	5	X	14
New Zealand	0	2	0	0	0	1	0	X	3

Sheet E	1	2	3	4	5	6	7	8	Final
Scotland	5	0	2	1	0	2	X	X	10
Bulgaria	0	3	0	0	3	0	X	X	6

14:30

Sheet A	1	2	3	4	5	6	7	8	Final
Bulgaria	0	0	1	0	3	0	X	X	4
Finland	3	1	0	4	0	2	X	X	10

Sheet B	1	2	3	4	5	6	7	8	9	Final
Russia	3	0	1	0	2	0	0	0	0	6
Scotland	0	1	0	1	0	2	1	1	1	7

Sheet D	1	2	3	4	5	6	7	8	Final
Italy	2	0	2	1	3	1	1	X	10
Australia	0	2	0	0	0	0	0	X	2

Sheet E	1	2	3	4	5	6	7	8	Final
Canada	2	0	1	0	2	0	1	X	6
New Zealand	0	2	0	1	0	1	0	X	4

=== Green group ===
==== April 19 ====
08:00

Sheet E	1	2	3	4	5	6	7	8	9	Final
Estonia	0	1	0	3	0	2	0	3	2	11
United States	2	0	2	0	1	0	4	0	0	9

11:15

Sheet E	1	2	3	4	5	6	7	8	Final
Spain	0	0	2	0	2	0	2	0	6
Denmark	2	1	0	1	0	2	0	1	7

14:30

Sheet A	1	2	3	4	5	6	7	8	Final
Sweden	1	0	1	1	1	0	2	X	6
Norway	0	2	0	0	0	1	0	X	3

Sheet B	1	2	3	4	5	6	7	8	Final
Hungary	2	1	0	0	1	0	0	2	6
China	0	0	2	2	0	1	2	0	7

17:45

Sheet B	1	2	3	4	5	6	7	8	Final
Estonia	3	0	2	1	1	1	3	X	11
Spain	0	1	0	0	0	0	0	X	1

21:00

Sheet C	1	2	3	4	5	6	7	8	Final
South Korea	1	0	0	1	0	1	0	1	4
Denmark	0	2	1	0	1	0	3	0	7

Sheet D	1	2	3	4	5	6	7	8	Final
Hungary	1	0	2	2	0	0	2	0	7
United States	0	1	0	0	1	2	0	2	6

Sheet E	1	2	3	4	5	6	7	8	Final
Norway	3	0	0	1	0	1	0	2	7
China	0	1	1	0	4	0	2	0	8

==== April 20 ====
08:00

Sheet D	1	2	3	4	5	6	7	8	9	Final
Sweden	0	3	1	0	2	0	0	3	0	9
Spain	1	0	0	2	0	4	2	0	2	11

11:15

Sheet D	1	2	3	4	5	6	7	8	Final
Norway	0	2	0	1	0	2	0	X	5
Denmark	2	0	1	0	2	0	3	X	8

Sheet E	1	2	3	4	5	6	7	8	Final
Hungary	0	3	2	1	0	3	3	X	12
Estonia	2	0	0	0	1	0	0	X	3

14:30

Sheet A	1	2	3	4	5	6	7	8	Final
China	1	0	0	0	0	0	X	X	1
South Korea	0	2	1	3	1	2	X	X	9

17:45

Sheet A	1	2	3	4	5	6	7	8	Final
Norway	0	0	0	0	0	2	X	X	2
United States	1	2	2	2	2	0	X	X	9

21:00

Sheet B	1	2	3	4	5	6	7	8	Final
China	0	2	0	3	2	0	1	0	8
Denmark	1	0	1	0	0	2	0	1	5

Sheet C	1	2	3	4	5	6	7	8	Final
Sweden	2	1	0	3	1	X	X	X	7
Estonia	0	0	1	0	0	X	X	X	1

Sheet E	1	2	3	4	5	6	7	8	Final
South Korea	0	1	0	0	0	0	X	X	1
Hungary	2	0	3	1	2	1	X	X	9

==== April 21 ====
8:00

Sheet A	1	2	3	4	5	6	7	8	Final
Hungary	1	0	2	0	3	0	2	0	8
Spain	0	2	0	1	0	2	0	1	6

11:15

Sheet B	1	2	3	4	5	6	7	8	Final
South Korea	0	2	0	1	0	5	0	2	10
Norway	3	0	3	0	1	0	1	0	8

Sheet D	1	2	3	4	5	6	7	8	Final
China	1	1	1	0	1	4	X	X	8
Sweden	0	0	0	1	0	0	X	X	7

14:30

Sheet E	1	2	3	4	5	6	7	8	Final
United States	0	1	0	2	2	2	0	X	7
Spain	3	0	1	0	0	0	1	X	5

17:45

Sheet A	1	2	3	4	5	6	7	8	Final
Denmark	1	0	1	0	0	2	1	0	5
Sweden	0	2	0	1	1	0	0	2	6

Sheet C	1	2	3	4	5	6	7	8	Final
Spain	0	2	2	2	0	4	X	X	10
South Korea	1	0	0	0	1	0	X	X	2

Sheet E	1	2	3	4	5	6	7	8	Final
Norway	0	1	0	1	0	1	X	X	3
Hungary	3	0	4	0	2	0	X	X	9

21:00

Sheet D	1	2	3	4	5	6	7	8	Final
United States	1	0	2	1	0	2	0	0	6
China	0	4	0	0	2	0	3	1	10

==== April 22 ====
08:00

Sheet B	1	2	3	4	5	6	7	8	Final
Sweden	0	0	2	1	0	4	1	X	8
Hungary	2	1	0	0	1	0	0	X	4

Sheet C	1	2	3	4	5	6	7	8	Final
Spain	1	0	1	0	1	0	1	0	4
Norway	0	2	0	5	0	1	0	1	9

Sheet E	1	2	3	4	5	6	7	8	Final
China	4	0	1	1	2	1	0	X	9
Estonia	0	3	0	0	0	0	2	X	5

14:30

Sheet B	1	2	3	4	5	6	7	8	Final
Denmark	0	2	4	0	1	0	0	1	8
United States	2	0	0	1	0	2	1	0	6

Sheet D	1	2	3	4	5	6	7	8	Final
Estonia	1	0	2	0	1	0	2	0	6
Norway	0	3	0	1	0	4	0	1	9

Sheet E	1	2	3	4	5	6	7	8	Final
South Korea	1	1	0	2	0	0	0	X	4
Sweden	0	0	4	0	2	1	1	X	9

21:00

Sheet A	1	2	3	4	5	6	7	8	Final
United States	0	2	0	0	1	0	1	0	4
Sweden	1	0	1	1	0	3	0	3	9

Sheet D	1	2	3	4	5	6	7	8	Final
Spain	1	0	0	0	1	0	4	0	6
South Korea	0	2	1	1	0	2	0	2	8

==== April 23 ====
08:00

Sheet A	1	2	3	4	5	6	7	8	Final
Spain	0	0	0	0	2	0	2	X	4
China	1	1	1	1	0	2	0	X	6

Sheet D	1	2	3	4	5	6	7	8	Final
Denmark	0	1	0	1	0	0	X	X	2
Estonia	3	0	2	0	3	4	X	X	12

11:15

Sheet C	1	2	3	4	5	6	7	8	Final
United States	0	1	0	2	2	0	3	X	8
South Korea	1	0	1	0	0	1	0	X	3

14:30

Sheet C	1	2	3	4	5	6	7	8	Final
Denmark	1	0	1	0	0	0	1	X	3
Hungary	0	2	0	2	1	2	0	X	7

== Tiebreaker ==
April 23, 19:00

Sheet B	1	2	3	4	5	6	7	8	Final
Hungary	0	2	0	3	3	1	0	X	9
Sweden	1	0	1	0	0	0	2	X	4

Sheet C	1	2	3	4	5	6	7	8	Final
Czech Republic	3	0	3	2	1	2	X	X	11
Poland	0	3	0	0	0	0	X	X	3

== Playoffs ==
=== Semifinal challenge 1 ===
April 24, 09:00

Sheet A	1	2	3	4	5	6	7	8	Final
Hungary	4	1	0	1	0	3	0	X	9
Czech Republic	0	0	4	0	1	0	1	X	6

=== Semifinal challenge 2 ===
April 24, 13:00

Sheet A	1	2	3	4	5	6	7	8	Final
Finland	0	1	0	0	0	2	0	X	3
Hungary	2	0	4	1	1	0	1	X	9

=== Brackets ===
Semi-final
Hungary	7
Canada	5
China	2
Switzerland	10

Final
Hungary	4
Switzerland	7
Bronze medal
Canada	6
China	5

=== Semifinals ===
April 24, 18:00

Sheet B	1	2	3	4	5	6	7	8	Final
Hungary	1	0	2	0	0	3	1	0	7
Canada	0	1	0	2	1	0	0	1	5

Sheet C	1	2	3	4	5	6	7	8	Final
China	0	2	0	0	0	0	X	X	2
Switzerland	2	0	2	1	1	4	X	X	10

=== Bronze-medal game ===
April 25, 12:00

Sheet B	1	2	3	4	5	6	7	8	Final
Canada	0	0	0	0	0	3	2	1	6
China	1	1	1	1	1	0	0	0	5

=== Gold-medal game ===
April 25, 12:00

Sheet D	1	2	3	4	5	6	7	8	Final
Hungary	1	0	0	0	0	0	3	0	4
Switzerland	0	2	1	1	1	1	0	1	7

2009 World Mixed Doubles Curling Championship Winner
(Switzerland)
Switzerland
2nd title
