= World Mixed Doubles Curling Championship =

International mixed doubles curling event

- Established: 2008
- 2027 host city: Lohja, Finland
- 2027 arena: Kisakallio Sports Institute
- 2026 champion: Australia

Current edition
- 2027 World Mixed Doubles Curling Championship

The World Mixed Doubles Curling Championships are annual curling tournaments featuring the world's best teams of mixed doubles curlers.

== History ==
The tournament began in 2008 with the 2008 World Mixed Doubles Curling Championship. Switzerland's mixed doubles team of Irene Schori and Toni Müller dominated the 2008 and 2009 championships and appeared in the first three worlds. At the 2010 Worlds, Russia won its first ever world curling title by defeating New Zealand, also first-time curling medalists. Russia did not successfully defend its world title, however, as they were defeated in the final of the 2011 Worlds by Switzerland, who won its third championship in four years. Switzerland then defended its title the next year, earning its fourth gold medal with a win over Sweden. In 2013, Hungary won their first world curling title after defeating Sweden in the final.

The 2020 event was cancelled on March 14, 2020 due to the COVID-19 pandemic.

== Qualification ==
From its creation in 2008 until 2019 the championship was open entry, meaning any World Curling Federation (WCF) member could send a team. With the popularity of curling, and specifically mixed doubles, growing this policy of open entry led to 48 teams participating in the 2019 championship, the final year of open entry.

Beginning in 2020 the championship was limited to 20 teams, the top sixteen countries from the previous championship and four countries from a newly created qualification event. Called the World Mixed Doubles Qualification Event, the inaugural tournament was held in December 2019 in Howwood, Scotland. This qualification tournament is open to any WCF member not already qualified for the championship.

== Results ==
Name of female curler, then male curler listed below country.

Year	Location	Final			Third Place Match
Year	Location	Champion	Score	Second Place	Third Place	Score	Fourth Place
2008	(Finland) Vierumäki	Switzerland; Irene Schori; Toni Müller	5–4	Finland; Anne Malmi; Jussi Uusipaavalniemi	Sweden; Marie Persson; Göran Carlsson	9–2	Norway; Linn Githmark; Tormod Andreassen
2009	(Italy) Cortina d'Ampezzo	Switzerland; Irene Schori; Toni Müller	7–4	Hungary; Ildikó Szekeres; György Nagy	Canada; Allison Nimik; Sean Grassie	6–5	China; Sun Yue; Zhang Zhipeng
2010	(Russia) Chelyabinsk	Russia; Yana Nekrasova; Petr Dron	9–7	New Zealand; Bridget Becker; Sean Becker	China; Sun Yue; Zhang Zhipeng	8–7	Spain; Irantzu García; Sergio Vez
2011	(United States) St. Paul	Switzerland; Alina Pätz; Sven Michel	11–2	Russia; Alina Kovaleva; Alexey Tselousov	France; Pauline Jeanneret; Amaury Pernette	8–6	Sweden; Sabina Kraupp; Anders Kraupp
2012	(Turkey) Erzurum	Switzerland; Nadine Lehmann; Martin Rios	7–6	Sweden; Camilla Johansson; Per Noréen	Austria; Claudia Toth; Christian Roth	12–7	United States; Cristin Clark; Brady Clark
2013	(Canada) Fredericton	Hungary; Dorottya Palancsa; Zsolt Kiss	8–7	Sweden; Elisabeth Norredahl; Fredrik Hallström	Czech Republic; Zuzana Hájková; Tomáš Paul	8–1	Norway; Kristin Skaslien; Magnus Nedregotten
2014	(Scotland) Dumfries	Switzerland; Michelle Gribi; Reto Gribi	8–6	Sweden; Camilla Johansson; Per Noréen	Spain; Irantzu García; Sergio Vez	7–4	Hungary; Dorottya Palancsa; Zsolt Kiss
2015	(Russia) Sochi	Hungary; Dorottya Palancsa; Zsolt Kiss	6–5	Sweden; Camilla Johansson; Per Noréen	Norway; Kristin Skaslien; Magnus Nedregotten	9–4	Canada; Kalynn Park; Charley Thomas
2016	(Sweden) Karlstad	Russia; Anastasia Bryzgalova; Alexander Krushelnitskiy	7–5	China; Wang Rui; Ba Dexin	United States; Tabitha Peterson; Joe Polo	9–7	Scotland; Gina Aitken; Bruce Mouat
2017	(Canada) Lethbridge	Switzerland; Jenny Perret; Martin Rios	6–5	Canada; Joanne Courtney; Reid Carruthers	China; Wang Rui; Ba Dexin	6–2	Czech Republic; Zuzana Hájková; Tomáš Paul
2018	(Sweden) Östersund	Switzerland; Michèle Jäggi; Sven Michel	9–6	Russia; Maria Komarova; Daniil Goriachev	Canada; Laura Crocker; Kirk Muyres	8–3	South Korea; Jang Hye-ji; Lee Ki-jeong
2019	(Norway) Stavanger	Sweden; Anna Hasselborg; Oskar Eriksson	6–5	Canada; Jocelyn Peterman; Brett Gallant	United States; Cory Christensen; John Shuster	5–4	Australia; Tahli Gill; Dean Hewitt
2020	(Canada) Kelowna	Cancelled			Cancelled
2021	(Scotland) Aberdeen	Scotland; Jennifer Dodds; Bruce Mouat	9–7	Norway; Kristin Skaslien; Magnus Nedregotten	Sweden; Almida de Val; Oskar Eriksson	7–4	Canada; Kerri Einarson; Brad Gushue
2022	(Switzerland) Geneva	Scotland; Eve Muirhead; Bobby Lammie	9–7	Switzerland; Alina Pätz; Sven Michel	Germany; Pia-Lisa Schöll; Klaudius Harsch	7–5	Norway; Maia Ramsfjell; Magnus Ramsfjell
2023	(South Korea) Gangneung	United States; Cory Thiesse; Korey Dropkin	8–2	Japan; Chiaki Matsumura; Yasumasa Tanida	Norway; Martine Rønning; Mathias Brænden	6–2	Canada; Jennifer Jones; Brent Laing
2024	(Sweden) Östersund	Sweden; Isabella Wranå; Rasmus Wranå	8–4	Estonia; Marie Kaldvee; Harri Lill	Norway; Kristin Skaslien; Magnus Nedregotten	6–5	Switzerland; Briar Schwaller-Hürlimann; Yannick Schwaller
2025	(Canada) Fredericton	Italy; Stefania Constantini; Amos Mosaner	9–4	Scotland; Jennifer Dodds; Bruce Mouat	Australia; Tahli Gill; Dean Hewitt	9–2	Estonia; Marie Kaldvee; Harri Lill
2026	(Switzerland) Geneva	Australia; Tahli Gill; Dean Hewitt	8–4	Sweden; Therese Westman; Robin Ahlberg	Canada; Kadriana Lott; Colton Lott	11–3	Italy; Stefania Constantini; Amos Mosaner
2027	(Finland) Lohja
2028	(Canada) Olds

== Medal table ==
As of 2026 World Mixed Doubles Curling Championship

Rank	Nation	Gold	Silver	Bronze	Total
1	Switzerland	7	1	0	8
2	Sweden	2	5	2	9
3	Russia	2	2	0	4
4	Hungary	2	1	0	3
4	Scotland	2	1	0	3
6	United States	1	0	2	3
7	Australia	1	0	1	2
8	Italy	1	0	0	1
9	Canada	0	2	3	5
10	Norway	0	1	3	4
11	China	0	1	2	3
12	Estonia	0	1	0	1
12	Finland	0	1	0	1
12	Japan	0	1	0	1
12	New Zealand	0	1	0	1
16	Austria	0	0	1	1
16	Czech Republic	0	0	1	1
16	France	0	0	1	1
16	Germany	0	0	1	1
16	Spain	0	0	1	1
Totals (20 entries)		18	18	18	54

== Performance timeline ==
Country	2000s		2010s										2020s							Years
Country	08	09	10	11	12	13	14	15	16	17	18	19	21	22	23	24	25	26	27	Years
Australia	17	23	5	16	24	22	12	28	31	18	18	4	13	11	8	15	3rd place, bronze medalist(s)	1st place, gold medalist(s)	Q	19
Austria		21	15	21	3rd place, bronze medalist(s)	8	8	26	11	24	32	23			17					12
Belarus							31	29	26	22	21	28								6
Belgium									41			40								2
Brazil							34	30	29	28	17	26								6
Bulgaria		26							17	34										3
Canada	5	3rd place, bronze medalist(s)		12	6	10	10	4	5	2nd place, silver medalist(s)	3rd place, bronze medalist(s)	2nd place, silver medalist(s)	4	5	4	5	6	3rd place, bronze medalist(s)	Q	18
China	10	4	3rd place, bronze medalist(s)	6	7	13	11	16	2nd place, silver medalist(s)	3rd place, bronze medalist(s)	13	19	9			12	17	12	Q	17
Chinese Taipei												31								1
Croatia										37	40	41								3
Czech Republic	6	6	9	13	16	3rd place, bronze medalist(s)	7	18	21	4	10	5	7	13	15	16	16	11	Q	19
Denmark	21	12	12	5	9	16	27	5	13	30	20	22		12	9	14	15	19		17
England	23	19	13	20	22	25	33	15	8	17	26	9	14	15	20					15
Estonia	16	14	8	19	8	15	22	5	6	32	13	5	19	14	5	2nd place, silver medalist(s)	4	7	Q	19
Finland	2nd place, silver medalist(s)	5	17	9	14	18	14	14	7	7	13	9	17	17			10	17	Q	17
France	12	15		3rd place, bronze medalist(s)	23	20	13	21	27	31	19	35				18		17	Q	14
Germany					20		32		34	21	29	20	10	3rd place, bronze medalist(s)	18	11	14	14	Q	13
Greece												39								1
Guyana											24	37								2
Hong Kong											27	38								2
Hungary	9	2nd place, silver medalist(s)	11	10	13	1st place, gold medalist(s)	4	1st place, gold medalist(s)	13	13	6	9	15	10	19			15	Q	17
Ireland					26		26		12	13	36	34								6
Israel									33	26	37									3
Italy	11	16	6	22	12	17	24	9	19	12	12	18	5	7	11	8	1st place, gold medalist(s)	4	Q	19
Japan	13	17	14	7	15	14	18	10	20	19	5	5	15	9	2nd place, silver medalist(s)	9	13	5	Q	19
Kazakhstan							28		38	38	23	25								5
Kosovo												44								1
Latvia	7	11	16	24	11	23	17	12	32	8	25	27							Q	13
Lithuania									24		28	32								3
Luxembourg									30		35									2
Mexico												46								1
Netherlands						11	25		37	36	38	43			14	13	19	13	Q	11
New Zealand	8	13	2nd place, silver medalist(s)	14	10	5	21	20	13	29	39	9	12	20		19	9	15	Q	18
Nigeria												47								1
Norway	4	22		18	25	4	5	3rd place, bronze medalist(s)	9	5	11	9	2nd place, silver medalist(s)	4	3rd place, bronze medalist(s)	3rd place, bronze medalist(s)	8	9	Q	18
Poland	18	8					16	24	22	33	34	21								8
Qatar									42			42								2
Romania					27	27	23	27	35	35	31	36								8
Russia	20	10	1st place, gold medalist(s)	2nd place, silver medalist(s)		9	6	5	1st place, gold medalist(s)	9	2nd place, silver medalist(s)	5	11							12
Saudi Arabia												48								1
Scotland	14	9		17	5	7	9	19	4	11	9	9	1st place, gold medalist(s)	1st place, gold medalist(s)	5	6	2nd place, silver medalist(s)	5	Q	18
Serbia									40	39										2
Slovakia	19	24	18	15	17	19	29	25	10	25	33	29								12
Slovenia						26	30	23	39	20	30	33								7
South Korea		20		23	19	24	15	11	13	6	4	24	17	15	16	7	12	10	Q	17
Spain	22	25	4	11	18	21	3rd place, bronze medalist(s)	17	23	13	22	9	20	17	13	20	20			17
Sweden	3rd place, bronze medalist(s)	7		4	2nd place, silver medalist(s)	2nd place, silver medalist(s)	2nd place, silver medalist(s)	2nd place, silver medalist(s)	25	13	7	1st place, gold medalist(s)	3rd place, bronze medalist(s)	5	10	1st place, gold medalist(s)	7	2nd place, silver medalist(s)	Q	18
Switzerland	1st place, gold medalist(s)	1st place, gold medalist(s)	7	1st place, gold medalist(s)	1st place, gold medalist(s)	6	1st place, gold medalist(s)	13	28	1st place, gold medalist(s)	1st place, gold medalist(s)	9	5	2nd place, silver medalist(s)	7	4	11	8	Q	19
Turkey					21			22	17	27	8	17		19	12	17	18			10
Ukraine												45								1
United States	15	18	10	8	4	12	19	5	3rd place, bronze medalist(s)	10	13	3rd place, bronze medalist(s)	8	8	1st place, gold medalist(s)	10	5	20	Q	19
Wales	24	27					20		36	23		30								6

== Multiple medallists ==
As of 2026 World Mixed Doubles Curling Championship

No.	Female curler	No.	Male curler	Country	Period (Note: Period from the first to the last medals won.)	Gold medal – first place	Silver medal – second place	Bronze medal – third place	Total
1	—N/a	1	Sven Michel	Switzerland	2011–2022	2	1	–	3
1	Camilla Johansson	1	Per Noréen	Sweden	2012–2015	–	3	–	3
1	Kristin Skaslien	1	Magnus Nedregotten	Norway	2015–2024	–	1	2	3
3	Irene Schori	4	Toni Müller	Switzerland	2008–2009	2	–	–	2
3	—N/a	4	Martin Rios	Switzerland	2012–2017	2	–	–	2
3	Dorottya Palancsa	4	Zsolt Kiss	Hungary	2013–2015	2	–	–	2
3	Alina Pätz	4	—N/a	Switzerland	2011–2022	1	1	–	2
3	Jennifer Dodds	4	Bruce Mouat	Scotland	2021–2025	1	1	–	2
3	—N/a	4	Oskar Eriksson	Sweden	2019–2021	1	–	1	2
3	Cory Thiesse	4	—N/a	United States	2019–2023	1	–	1	2
3	Tahli Gill	4	Dean Hewitt	Australia	2025–2026	1	–	1	2
3	Rui Wang	4	Dexin Ba	China	2016–2017	–	1	1	2

== Records ==
Most championship titles
Female curler	Male curler	Country	No.	Years
Irene Schori	Toni Müller	Switzerland	2	2008–2009
—N/a	Sven Michel	Switzerland	2	2011, 2018
—N/a	Martin Rios	Switzerland	2	2012, 2017
Dorottya Palancsa	Zsolt Kiss	Hungary	2	2013, 2015

Most championship finals
Female curler	Male curler	Country	No.	Years
—N/a	Sven Michel	Switzerland	3	2011, 2018, 2022
Camilla Johansson	Per Noréen	Sweden	3	2012, 2014–2015

Most championship medals
Female curler	Male curler	Country	No.	Years
—N/a	Sven Michel	Switzerland	3	2011, 2018, 2022
Camilla Johansson	Per Noréen	Sweden	3	2012, 2014–2015
Kristin Skaslien	Magnus Nedregotten	Norway	3	2015, 2021, 2024

Most championship appearances
Female curler	Male curler	Country	No.	Years
Irantzu García	—N/a	Spain	10	2008, 2010–2018
—N/a	Harri Lill	Estonia	10	2016, 2018–2019, 2021–2027
—N/a	Dean Hewitt	Australia	10	2017–2019, 2021–2027
Kristin Skaslien	Magnus Nedregotten	Norway	9	2013–2017, 2019, 2021, 2024–2025

Most titles at back-to-back events
Female curler	Male curler	Country	No.	Period
Irene Schori	Toni Müller	Switzerland	2	2008–2009

Most finals at back-to-back events
Female curler	Male curler	Country	No.	Period
Irene Schori	Toni Müller	Switzerland	2	2008–2009
Camilla Johansson	Per Noréen	Sweden	2	2014–2015

Most medals at back-to-back events
Female curler	Male curler	Country	No.	Period
Irene Schori	Toni Müller	Switzerland	2	2008–2009
Camilla Johansson	Per Noréen	Sweden	2	2014–2015
Wang Rui	Ba Dexin	China	2	2016–2017
—N/a	Oskar Eriksson	Sweden	2	2019–2021
Tahli Gill	Dean Hewitt	Australia	2	2025–2026

Most appearances at back-to-back events
Female curler	Male curler	Country	No.	Period
—N/a	Dean Hewitt	Australia	10	2017–2027
Irantzu García	—N/a	Spain	9	2010–2018

Teams went undefeated in championship
Year	Country	Female curler	Male curler	Games played
2008	Switzerland	Irene Schori	Toni Müller	9
2009	Switzerland	Irene Schori	Toni Müller	10
2010	Russia	Yana Nekrasova	Petr Dron	9
2011	Switzerland	Alina Pätz	Sven Michel	10
2012	Switzerland	Nadine Lehmann	Martin Rios	11
2017	Switzerland	Jenny Perret	Martin Rios	10
2022	Scotland	Eve Muirhead	Bobby Lammie	11
2025	Italy	Stefania Constantini	Amos Mosaner	11

== See also ==
- List of World Men's Curling Champions
- List of World Women's Curling Champions
- List of Olympic medalists in curling
- List of Paralympic medalists in wheelchair curling
- European Curling Championships
- Pan Continental Curling Championships
- World Junior Curling Championships
