= 2008 World Mixed Doubles Curling Championship =

- Host city: Vierumäki, Finland
- Arena: Vierumäki Ice Rink
- Dates: March 8–15, 2008
- Winner: Switzerland
- Second: Irene Schori
- Lead: Toni Müller
- Finalist: Finland

The 2008 World Mixed Doubles Curling Championship was held March 8–15, 2008 in Vierumäki, Finland at the Vierumäki Ice Rink. It was the first mixed doubles world championships organized by the World Curling Federation.

Switzerland scored two perfect ends in Draw 2 against Wales, a rare feat.

== Teams ==
=== Blue group ===
China	Denmark	Finland
Second: Zhang Xindi; Lead: Li Guangxu	Second: Kirsten Jensen; Lead: Lasse Damm	Second: Jussi Uusipaavalniemi; Lead: Anne Malmi
New Zealand	Poland	Switzerland
Second: Bridget Becker; Lead: Sean Becker	Second: Agnieszka Ogrodniczek; Lead: Damian Herman	Second: Irene Schori; Lead: Toni Müller
United States	Wales	
Second: Jamie Haskell; Lead: Nate Haskell	Second: Lisa Peters; Lead: Phil Jones	

=== Red group ===
Canada	England	Estonia
Second: Susan O'Connor; Lead: Dean Ross	Second: Jane Clark; Lead: Steve Amann	Second: Marju Velga; Lead: Jan Anderson
Hungary	Italy	Japan
Second: Ildikó Szekeres; Lead: György Nagy	Second: Silvia Mingozzi; Lead: Alberto Rostagnotto	Second: Michiko Taira; Lead: Kenji Tomabechi
Slovakia	Sweden	
Second: Barbora Vojtusova; Lead: Stefan Turna	Second: Marie Persson; Lead: Göran Carlsson	

=== Green group ===
Australia	Czech Republic	Spain
Second: Jennifer Thomas; Lead: Gerald Chick	Second: Hana Cechova; Lead: Radek Zdarsky	Second: Irantzu Garcia; Lead: Sergio Vez
France	Latvia	Norway
Second: Helene Grieshaber; Lead: Lionel Roux	Second: Iveta Staša; Lead: Roberts Krusts	Second: Linn Githmark; Lead: Tormod Andreassen
Russia	Scotland	
Second: Ilona Grishina; Lead: Dmitry Abanin	Second: Judith Carr; Lead: Dillan A Perras	

=== Not Competing ===
The following teams were initially listed as participating in this event but on February 24, 2008 updated schedule they are not included.

- Netherlands
- Ireland
- Kazakhstan
- Brazil
- Germany

== Round robin ==
Blue group			Red group			Green group		
Country	W	L	Country	W	L	Country	W	L
Switzerland	7	0	Sweden	5	2	Norway	6	1
Finland	6	1	Canada	5	2	Czech Republic	5	2
China	4	3	Hungary	5	2	France	4	3
New Zealand	4	3	Italy	4	3	Latvia	4	3
United States	3	4	Estonia	3	4	Australia	3	4
Denmark	2	5	Japan	3	4	Scotland	3	4
Poland	2	5	Slovakia	2	5	Russia	2	5
Wales	0	7	England	1	6	Spain	1	6

== Results ==
=== Blue group ===
==== Draw 1 ====
March 8, 2008 09:00

Sheet A	1	2	3	4	5	6	7	8	Final
China	3	0	3	1	0	0	0	X	7
Denmark	0	2	0	0	1	1	1	X	5

Sheet B	1	2	3	4	5	6	7	8	Final
Finland	2	0	0	0	2	1	1	X	6
New Zealand	0	1	1	1	0	0	0	X	3

Sheet C	1	2	3	4	5	6	7	8	9	Final
Poland	0	0	0	1	0	1	1	1	0	4
Switzerland	0	1	1	0	2	0	0	0	2	8

Sheet D	1	2	3	4	5	6	7	8	Final
United States	1	2	1	1	1	0	0	X	6
Wales	0	0	0	0	0	1	1	X	2

==== Draw 2 ====
March 8, 2008 19:30

Sheet A	1	2	3	4	5	6	7	8	Final
Switzerland	0	6	2	1	0	6	X	X	15
Wales	1	0	0	0	1	0	X	X	2

Sheet B	1	2	3	4	5	6	7	8	Final
Poland	0	0	0	0	1	0	X	X	1
United States	1	1	1	1	0	3	X	X	7

Sheet C	1	2	3	4	5	6	7	8	Final
Denmark	2	0	3	0	0	0	2	0	7
New Zealand	0	2	0	2	1	2	0	2	9

Sheet D	1	2	3	4	5	6	7	8	Final
China	0	1	0	0	1	2	0	X	4
Finland	2	0	1	1	0	0	4	X	8

==== Draw 3 ====
March 9, 2008 16:00

Sheet A	1	2	3	4	5	6	7	8	Final
Poland	0	0	2	3	0	2	0	0	7
New Zealand	1	2	0	0	4	0	1	1	9

Sheet B	1	2	3	4	5	6	7	8	Final
China	1	1	2	2	2	0	2	X	10
Wales	0	0	0	0	0	2	0	X	2

Sheet C	1	2	3	4	5	6	7	8	Final
United States	0	0	1	0	0	0	X	X	1
Finland	1	1	0	2	2	1	X	X	7

Sheet D	1	2	3	4	5	6	7	8	Final
Denmark	0	0	0	0	1	0	X	X	1
Switzerland	2	1	3	2	0	2	X	X	10

==== Draw 4 ====
March 10, 2008 12:30

Sheet A	1	2	3	4	5	6	7	8	Final
Finland	0	0	1	0	1	0	1	X	3
Switzerland	1	1	0	1	0	2	0	X	5

Sheet B	Final
United States	L
Denmark	W

Sheet C	1	2	3	4	5	6	7	8	Final
China	1	0	3	1	0	3	1	0	9
Poland	0	4	0	0	3	0	0	1	8

Sheet D	1	2	3	4	5	6	7	8	Final
Wales	2	0	2	0	3	1	0	0	8
New Zealand	0	1	0	5	0	0	2	1	9

==== Draw 5 ====
March 11, 2008 09:00

Sheet A	1	2	3	4	5	6	7	8	9	Final
United States	0	0	4	0	1	0	1	1	0	7
China	3	1	0	2	0	1	0	0	1	8

Sheet B	1	2	3	4	5	6	7	8	Final
New Zealand	0	0	0	0	0	1	0	X	1
Switzerland	2	1	1	1	1	0	3	X	9

Sheet C	1	2	3	4	5	6	7	8	Final
Finland	1	0	0	2	0	0	3	X	6
Wales	0	1	1	0	1	1	0	X	4

Sheet D	1	2	3	4	5	6	7	8	9	Final
Poland	0	1	0	1	2	0	2	0	2	8
Denmark	1	0	1	0	0	1	0	3	0	6

==== Draw 6 ====
March 11, 2008 19:30

Sheet A	1	2	3	4	5	6	7	8	Final
Denmark	0	0	4	0	0	1	0	X	5
Finland	2	1	0	3	2	0	2	X	10

Sheet B	1	2	3	4	5	6	7	8	Final
Wales	0	3	0	1	0	2	0	0	6
Poland	4	0	1	0	2	0	2	1	10

Sheet C	1	2	3	4	5	6	7	8	Final
New Zealand	0	2	0	3	0	2	0	0	7
China	2	0	1	0	1	0	1	1	6

Sheet D	1	2	3	4	5	6	7	8	Final
Switzerland	3	0	1	0	3	1	0	X	8
United States	0	1	0	2	0	0	1	X	4

==== Draw 7 ====
Sheet A	1	2	3	4	5	6	7	8	Final
New Zealand	2	0	2	0	1	0	0	X	5
United States	0	1	0	4	0	3	1	X	9

Sheet B	1	2	3	4	5	6	7	8	Final
Switzerland	0	4	0	3	2	1	1	X	11
China	1	0	2	0	0	0	0	X	3

Sheet C	1	2	3	4	5	6	7	8	Final
Wales	1	1	3	0	1	0	0	0	6
Denmark	0	0	0	3	0	3	2	1	9

Sheet D	1	2	3	4	5	6	7	8	Final
Finland	4	0	2	0	4	0	2	X	12
Poland	0	2	0	2	0	1	0	X	5

=== Red group ===
==== Draw 1 ====
March 8, 2008 12:30

Sheet A	1	2	3	4	5	6	7	8	Final
Canada	3	1	0	5	0	2	X	X	11
England	0	0	1	0	2	0	X	X	3

Sheet B	1	2	3	4	5	6	7	8	Final
Estonia	1	1	0	0	3	0	0	2	7
Hungary	0	0	2	1	0	1	1	0	5

Sheet C	1	2	3	4	5	6	7	8	Final
Italy	0	0	2	0	1	0	0	X	3
Japan	1	3	0	3	0	5	2	X	14

Sheet D	1	2	3	4	5	6	7	8	Final
Slovakia	0	0	0	5	0	3	0	X	8
Sweden	5	2	2	0	4	0	1	X	14

==== Draw 2 ====
March 9, 2008 09:00

Sheet A	1	2	3	4	5	6	7	8	Final
Japan	3	0	2	0	0	1	0	X	6
Sweden	0	5	0	1	1	0	3	X	10

Sheet B	1	2	3	4	5	6	7	8	Final
Italy	0	3	0	3	0	1	1	1	9
Slovakia	3	0	1	0	2	0	0	0	6

Sheet C	1	2	3	4	5	6	7	8	Final
England	0	0	1	0	0	1	0	X	2
Hungary	3	1	0	1	3	0	1	X	9

Sheet D	1	2	3	4	5	6	7	8	Final
Canada	0	5	1	1	1	0	2	X	10
Estonia	2	0	0	0	0	1	0	X	3

==== Draw 3 ====
March 9, 2008 19:30

Sheet A	1	2	3	4	5	6	7	8	Final
Italy	0	0	1	0	3	0	3	0	7
Hungary	1	1	0	2	0	3	0	3	10

Sheet B	1	2	3	4	5	6	7	8	Final
Canada	0	3	0	0	2	0	2	0	7
Sweden	1	0	1	1	0	1	0	1	5

Sheet C	1	2	3	4	5	6	7	8	Final
Slovakia	0	1	0	0	2	0	0	X	3
Estonia	2	0	2	2	0	1	1	X	8

Sheet D	Final
England	L
Japan	W

==== Draw 4 ====
March 10, 2008 16:00

Sheet A	1	2	3	4	5	6	7	8	Final
Estonia	0	2	1	1	0	2	1	0	7
Japan	5	0	0	0	3	0	0	1	9

Sheet B	1	2	3	4	5	6	7	8	Final
Slovakia	1	2	0	3	0	2	0	0	8
England	0	0	2	0	1	0	1	1	5

Sheet C	1	2	3	4	5	6	7	8	Final
Canada	2	0	0	1	0	3	0	0	6
Italy	0	2	1	0	2	0	2	3	10

Sheet D	1	2	3	4	5	6	7	8	Final
Sweden	4	3	0	2	1	0	0	X	10
Hungary	0	0	1	0	0	3	1	X	5

==== Draw 5 ====
March 11, 2008 12:30

Sheet A	1	2	3	4	5	6	7	8	Final
Slovakia	0	2	0	4	0	0	5	0	11
Canada	3	0	4	0	3	1	0	1	12

Sheet B	1	2	3	4	5	6	7	8	9	Final
Hungary	1	0	0	2	0	3	1	0	1	8
Japan	0	3	2	0	1	0	0	1	0	7

Sheet C	1	2	3	4	5	6	7	8	Final
Estonia	0	3	0	1	4	0	2	0	10
Sweden	1	0	2	0	0	2	0	2	7

Sheet D	1	2	3	4	5	6	7	8	Final
Italy	0	2	0	5	0	4	X	X	11
England	1	0	1	0	1	0	X	X	3

==== Draw 6 ====
March 12, 2008 09:00

Sheet A	1	2	3	4	5	6	7	8	Final
England	0	0	1	1	0	3	1	1	7
Estonia	2	1	0	0	2	0	0	0	5

Sheet B	1	2	3	4	5	6	7	8	Final
Sweden	0	2	0	5	0	1	5	X	13
Italy	1	0	2	0	1	0	0	X	4

Sheet C	1	2	3	4	5	6	7	8	Final
Hungary	1	0	1	1	0	2	0	1	6
Canada	0	1	0	0	2	0	1	0	4

Sheet D	1	2	3	4	5	6	7	8	Final
Japan	1	0	0	0	0	1	0	X	2
Slovakia	0	3	1	1	1	0	3	X	9

==== Draw 7 ====
Sheet A	1	2	3	4	5	6	7	8	Final
Hungary	0	1	0	2	2	1	2	X	8
Slovakia	1	0	1	0	0	0	0	X	2

Sheet B	1	2	3	4	5	6	7	8	9	Final
Japan	0	5	1	0	0	0	0	1	0	7
Canada	1	0	0	1	2	2	1	0	5	12

Sheet C	1	2	3	4	5	6	7	8	Final
Sweden	3	1	2	0	4	2	X	X	12
England	0	0	0	1	0	0	X	X	1

Sheet D	1	2	3	4	5	6	7	8	9	Final
Estonia	0	1	0	2	1	0	4	0	0	8
Italy	1	0	1	0	0	1	0	5	2	10

=== Green group ===
==== Draw 1 ====
March 8, 16:00

Sheet A	Final
Australia	0
Czech Republic	7

Sheet B	Final
Spain	4
France	14

Sheet C	Final
Latvia	2
Norway	11

Sheet D	1	2	3	4	5	6	7	8	Final
Russia	0	1	1	0	2	0	0	X	4
Scotland	2	0	0	4	0	1	1	X	6

==== Draw 2 ====
March 9, 12:30

Sheet A	Final
Norway	9
Scotland	7

Sheet B	1	2	3	4	5	6	7	8	Final
Latvia	0	3	1	1	0	1	1	X	7
Russia	1	0	0	0	1	0	0	X	2

Sheet C	Final
Czech Republic	7
France	8

Sheet D	Final
Australia	8
Spain	1

==== Draw 3 ====
March 10, 09:00

Sheet A	Final
Latvia	7
France	3

Sheet B	Final
Australia	6
Scotland	7

Sheet C	1	2	3	4	5	6	7	8	Final
Russia	1	4	2	1	3	0	X	X	11
Spain	0	0	0	0	0	3	X	X	3

Sheet D	Final
Czech Republic	7
Norway	9

==== Draw 4 ====
March 10, 19:30

Sheet A	Final
Spain	7
Norway	3

Sheet B	1	2	3	4	5	6	7	8	Final
Russia	2	0	1	0	0	4	0	0	7
Czech Republic	0	1	0	1	1	0	4	1	8

Sheet C	Final
Australia	5
Latvia	7

Sheet D	Final
Scotland	4
France	7

==== Draw 5 ====
March 11, 16:00

Sheet A	1	2	3	4	5	6	7	8	Final
Russia	1	0	2	0	2	0	2	0	7
Australia	0	1	0	1	0	1	0	3	6

Sheet B	Final
France	2
Norway	8

Sheet C	Final
Spain	5
Scotland	8

Sheet D	Final
Latvia	5
Czech Republic	6

==== Draw 6 ====
March 12, 12:30

Sheet A	Final
Czech Republic	9
Spain	4

Sheet B	Final
Scotland	2
Latvia	8

Sheet C	Final
France	4
Australia	7

Sheet D	1	2	3	4	5	6	7	8	Final
Norway	0	3	0	2	0	1	1	0	7
Russia	3	0	1	0	1	0	0	1	6

==== Draw 7 ====
March 13, 09:00

Sheet A	1	2	3	4	5	6	7	8	Final
France	4	0	2	0	2	0	4	X	12
Russia	0	3	0	2	0	1	0	X	6

Sheet B	Final
Norway	6
Australia	7

Sheet C	Final
Scotland	0
Czech Republic	12

Sheet D	Final
Spain	8
Latvia	7

== Tie break ==
=== Red group ===
March 13, 12:30

Sheet D	Final
Hungary	4
Canada	7

== Playoffs ==
=== Semifinal challenge 1 ===
March 14, 2008 09:00

Sheet A	1	2	3	4	5	6	7	8	Final
Canada	2	0	3	0	4	1	1	X	11
Czech Republic	0	2	0	1	0	0	0	X	3

=== Semifinal challenge 2 ===
March 14, 2008 13:00

Sheet B	1	2	3	4	5	6	7	8	9	Final
Canada	0	3	0	3	0	0	2	0	0	8
Finland	1	0	3	0	1	1	0	2	1	9

=== Brackets ===
Semi-final
Switzerland	11
Norway	2
Sweden	4
Finland	6

Final
Switzerland	5
Finland	4
Bronze medal
Norway	2
Sweden	9

=== Semifinal ===
March 14, 2008 18:00

Sheet A	1	2	3	4	5	6	7	8	Final
Switzerland	3	3	0	3	1	1	0	X	11
Norway	0	0	1	0	0	0	1	X	2

Sheet D	1	2	3	4	5	6	7	8	Final
Finland	2	1	1	1	0	0	1	0	6
Sweden	0	0	0	0	2	1	0	1	4

=== Bronze medal game ===
March 15, 2008 12:00

Sheet B	1	2	3	4	5	6	7	8	Final
Norway	0	0	0	2	0	0	0	X	2
Sweden	3	1	1	0	2	1	1	X	9

=== Gold medal game ===
March 15, 2008 12:00

Sheet C	1	2	3	4	5	6	7	8	Final
Switzerland	2	1	0	1	0	1	0	0	5
Finland	0	0	1	0	1	0	1	1	4

2008 World Mixed Doubles Curling Championship Winner
(Switzerland)
Switzerland
1st title

== See also ==
- 2008 Brier
- 2008 World Men's Curling Championship
- 2008 World Junior Curling Championships
- 2008 Ford World Women's Curling Championship
- 2008 Scotties Tournament of Hearts
