= Dorottya Palancsa =

Hungarian female curler

- Curler
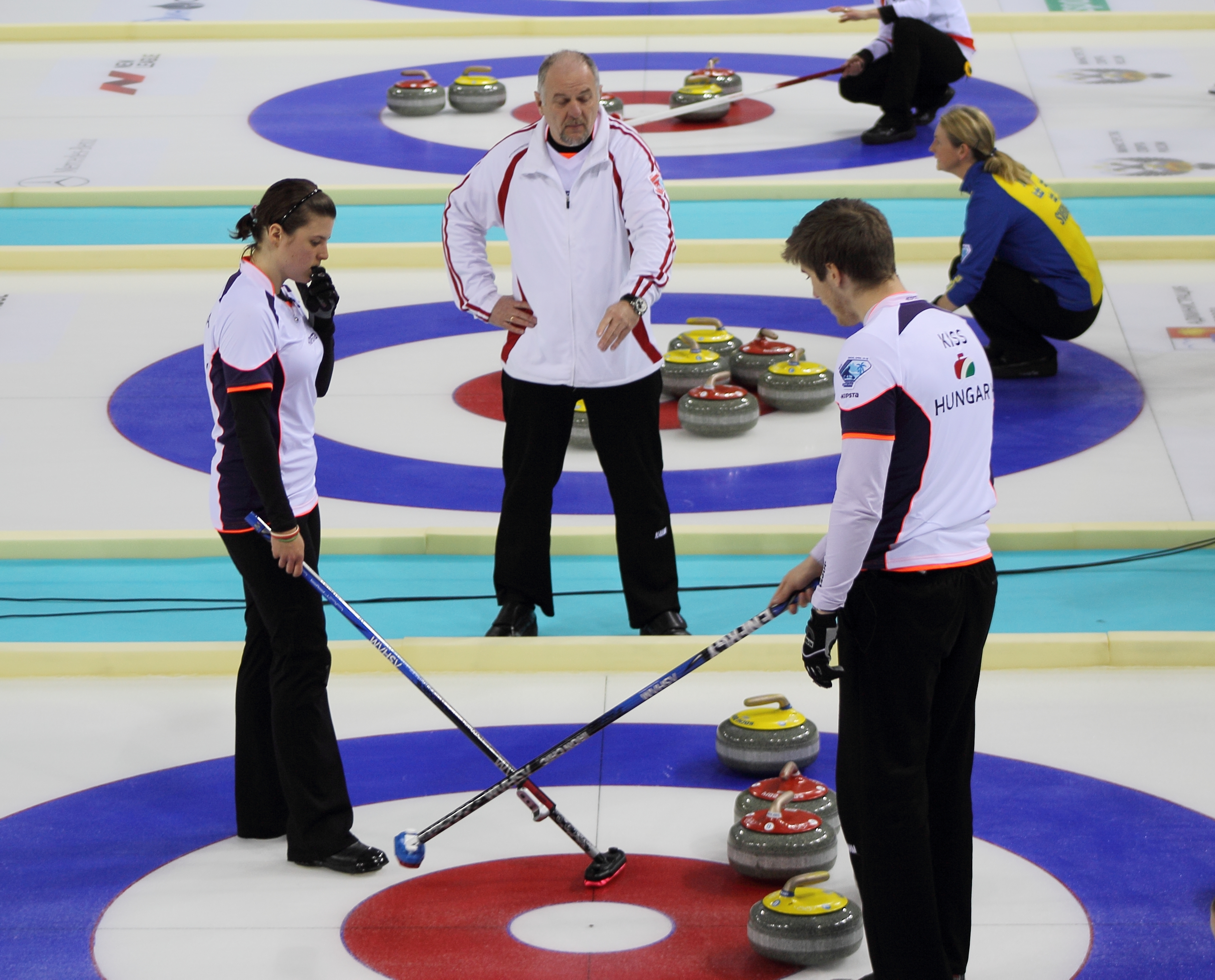
- Born: 18 May 1995 (age 31); Budapest, Hungary

Team
- Curling club: Újpesti TE, Budapest
- Mixed doubles partner: Lorinc Tatar

Curling career
- Member Association: Hungary
- World Mixed Doubles Championship: 8 (2013, 2014, 2015, 2016, 2017, 2019, 2021, 2026)
- European Championship: 6 (2014, 2015, 2016, 2017, 2018, 2019)
Medal record
Curling
Representing Hungary
World Mixed Doubles Championship
Gold medal – first place	2013 Fredericton
Gold medal – first place	2015 Sochi
European Junior Challenge
Silver medal – second place	2013 Prague
Silver medal – second place	2014 Lohja
Bronze medal – third place	2015 Prague

Dorottya Udvardi-Palancsa (Hungarian: Udvardi-Palancsa Dorottya; born 18 May 1995 in Budapest) is a Hungarian female curler.

On the international level she is two-time World mixed doubles curling champion (2013, 2015).

On the national level she is seven-time Hungarian women's curling champion (2014, 2015, 2016, 2017, 2018, 2019 and 2020), one-time Hungarian mixed curling champion (2016), eight-time Hungarian mixed doubles curling champion (2012, 2013, 2014, 2015, 2016, 2018, 2020 and 2021), three-time Hungarian junior women's curling champion (2010, 2011 and 2014), seven-time Hungarian Women's Curler of the Year (2012, 2013, 2014, 2016, 2017, 2018 and 2019).

== Teams and events ==
=== Women's ===
Season	Skip	Third	Second	Lead	Alternate	Coach	Events
2009–10	Vivien Úti	Dorottya Palancsa	Henrietta Miklai	Vera Kalocsai			HJWCC 2010 (gold)
2010–11	Dorottya Palancsa	Henrietta Miklai	Vivien Úti				HJWCC 2011 (gold)
2011–12	Zsanett Gunzinam (fourth)	Dorottya Palancsa (skip)	Vera Kalocsai	Henrietta Miklai	Tímea Nagy	Orsolya Rokusfalvy	EJCC 2012 (6th)
2012–13	Dorottya Palancsa	Henrietta Miklai	Ágnes Szentannai	Tímea Nagy	Vera Kalocsai	Orsolya Rokusfalvy	EJCC 2013 (silver)
2013–14	Dorottya Palancsa	Ágnes Szentannai	Zsanett Gunzinam	Henrietta Miklai	Vera Kalocsai	Orsolya Rokusfalvy	EJCC 2014 (silver)
2013–14	Dorottya Palancsa	Henrietta Miklai	Vera Kalocsai	Nikolett Sándor			HJWCC 2014 (gold)
2014–15	Dorottya Palancsa	Henrietta Miklai	Vera Kalocsai	Nikolett Sándor	Tímea Nagy	Zoltan Palancsa	ECC 2014 (12th)
2014–15	Dorottya Palancsa	Ágnes Szentannai	Vera Kalocsai	Nikolett Sándor		Orsolya Rokusfalvy	EJCC 2015 (bronze)
2015–16	Dorottya Palancsa	Henrietta Miklai	Vera Kalocsai	Bernadett Biro		Zoltan Palancsa	WJCC 2016 (4th)
2015–16	Dorottya Palancsa	Henrietta Miklai	Vera Kalocsai	Nikolett Sándor	Tímea Nagy	Zoltan Palancsa	ECC 2015 (10th)
2016–17	Dorottya Palancsa	Henrietta Miklai	Vera Kalocsai	Nikolett Sándor	Bernadett Biro	Zoltan Palancsa	ECC 2016 (11th)
2017–18	Dorottya Palancsa	Henrietta Miklai	Nikolett Sándor	Vera Kalocsai	Dorottya Micheller	Zoltan Palancsa	ECC 2017 (10th)
2018–19	Dorottya Palancsa	Henrietta Miklai	Nikolett Sándor	Orsolya Rokusfalvy	Dorottya Micheller	Zoltan Palancsa	ECC 2018 (15th); 2019 WQE (bronze)
2019–20	Dorottya Palancsa	Henrietta Miklai	Nikolett Sándor	Dorottya Micheller	Villoe Hamvas	Zoltan Palancsa	ECC 2019 (13th)

=== Mixed ===
Season	Skip	Third	Second	Lead	Coach	Events
2015–16	Ágnes Szentannai	Dorottya Palancsa	Kristóf Czermann	Zsolt Kiss		HMxCC 2016 (gold)
2016–17	Zsolt Kiss	Dorottya Palancsa	Kristof Czermann	Ágnes Szentannai		WMxCC 2016 (9th)
2018–19	Dorottya Palancsa (fourth)	Zoltan Palancsa (skip)	Henrietta Miklai	János Miklai	Peter Palancsa	WMxCC 2018 (24th)

=== Mixed doubles ===
Season	Male	Female	Coach	Events
2012–13	Zsolt Kiss	Dorottya Palancsa	Zoltan Palancsa	WMDCC 2013 (gold)
2013–14	Zsolt Kiss	Dorottya Palancsa	Zoltan Palancsa	WMDCC 2014 (4th)
2014–15	Zsolt Kiss	Dorottya Palancsa	Zoltan Palancsa	WMDCC 2015 (gold)
2015–16	Zsolt Kiss	Dorottya Palancsa	Zoltan Palancsa	WMDCC 2016 (13th)
2016–17	Zsolt Kiss	Dorottya Palancsa	Zoltan Palancsa	WMDCC 2017 (13th)
2018–19	Zsolt Kiss	Dorottya Palancsa	Zoltan Palancsa	WMDCC 2019 (9th)
2019–20	Zsolt Kiss	Dorottya Palancsa		
2020–21	Zsolt Kiss	Dorottya Palancsa	David Thomas Wills	WMDCC 2021 (15th)

== Personal life ==
She is from family of curlers: her father Zoltan is a curler and coach, her brother Peter is a curler and coach too.
