= Alexandra Béres =

Hungarian model and curler

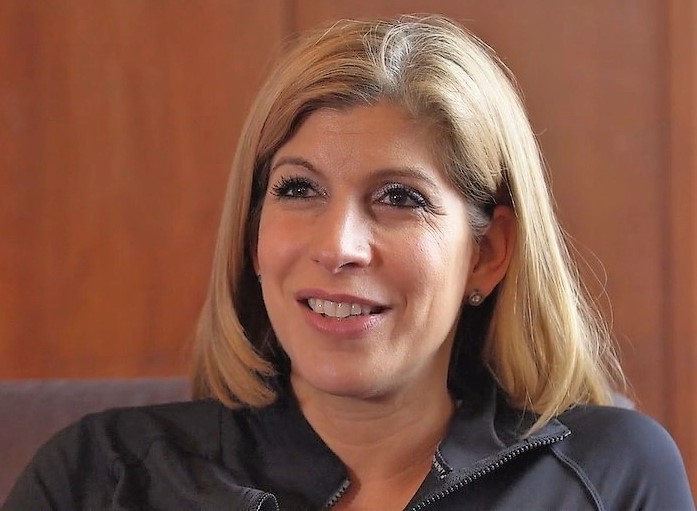
- Béres in 2017
- Born: 7 May 1976 (age 50); Budapest, Hungary
- Occupations: Fitness trainer; athlete
- Spouse: Krisztián Barna (m. 1996)
- Children: 2

Alexandra Béres (born 7 May 1976) is fitness world champion (Ms. Fitness World '96), curling pro and a magazine cover model from Hungary. In Hungary, she is well known as a "fitness legend" according to The Curling News.

She has played in three European Curling Championships for Hungary. In all three championships she played in the third position for skip Ildikó Szekeres. In 2003 they finished 18th, in 2004 they finished 14th and in 2005 they finished 15th. Béres also played in the 2005 European Mixed Curling Championship, where she played second for skip György Nagy (who threw third rocks). They would finish 5th. From 2010 to 2015, she again played third for skip Szekeres.

She is eleven-time Hungarian women's curling champion (2003, 2004, 2005, 2006, 2007, 2008, 2009, 2010, 2011, 2012, 2013) and Hungarian mixed curling champion (2005).

From 1997 to 1999 she placed in the top ten in several Bodybuilding competitions in Europe.

== Personal life ==
Alexandra Béres married photographer Krisztián Barna in 1996. Together they have two daughters: Panna, born in 2009, and Flóra, born in 2014. Beyond her professional career in fitness and sports, Béres is known for promoting a healthy lifestyle and inspiring many through her work.
