= Curling at the 2018 Winter Olympics – Statistics =

Statistics for curling at the 2018 Winter Olympics.

== Percentages ==
In curling, each player is graded on their shots.

=== Men's tournament ===
Percentages by draw.

==== Lead ====
#	Curler	1	2	3	4	5	6	7	8	9	Total
1	Oliver Dupont (DEN)	84	86	89	88	95	93	90	86	93	89
2	Lee Ki-bok (KOR)	98	90	91	84	81	85	88	85	83	87
2	Cammy Smith (GBR)	84	80	86	94	93	89	85	85	91	87
2	Valentin Tanner (SUI)	88	98	82	86	83	84	80	93	85	87
5	Ben Hebert (CAN)	88	91	68	85	91	88	88	88	95	86
5	Christoffer Sundgren (SWE)	85	90	75	93	88	81	86	81	94	86
7	Kosuke Morozumi (JPN)	88	88	83	76	89	75	89	75	88	83
7	John Landsteiner (USA)	82	78	100	72	86	83	75	86	86	83
7	Håvard Vad Petersson (NOR)	81	78	86	74	75	85	89	88	94	83
7	Daniele Ferrazza (ITA)	82	81	80	91	78	88	—	—	—	83

==== Second ====
#	Curler	1	2	3	4	5	6	7	8	9	Total
1	Rasmus Wranå (SWE)	85	92	95	79	89	89	68	97	94	88
2	Brent Laing (CAN)	80	89	81	94	81	86	82	86	95	86
3	Mikkel Poulsen (DEN)	90	64	90	96	80	83	88	90	93	85
3	Tsuyoshi Yamaguchi (JPN)	85	80	85	93	98	84	79	96	66	85
5	Oh Eun-su (KOR)	—	—	93	80	86	78	83	78	92	84
6	Matt Hamilton (USA)	93	76	86	90	82	67	78	71	95	82
7	Christoffer Svae (NOR)	75	85	95	69	90	76	80	81	75	81
7	Peter de Cruz (SUI)	76	79	85	81	79	93	80	78	83	81
7	Kyle Waddell (GBR)	82	80	84	81	81	75	83	89	77	81
10	Simone Gonin (ITA)	85	79	75	85	76	69	84	78	90	80

==== Third ====
#	Curler	1	2	3	4	5	6	7	8	9	Total
1	Oskar Eriksson (SWE)	86	93	95	88	88	91	86	89	86	89
1	Marc Kennedy (CAN)	86	83	89	95	89	96	90	90	83	89
3	Claudio Pätz (SUI)	91	91	88	91	83	74	77	74	85	84
4	Torger Nergård (NOR)	83	86	91	74	93	68	91	76	92	83
4	Seong Se-hyeon (KOR)	83	85	76	84	88	74	83	85	94	83
6	Johnny Frederiksen (DEN)	84	70	88	81	74	92	76	86	80	81
6	Thomas Muirhead (GBR)	80	68	83	81	82	89	74	89	86	81
8	Tetsuro Shimizu (JPN)	88	80	79	80	95	58	76	79	78	79
8	Tyler George (USA)	83	78	72	78	89	74	80	75	86	79
10	Joël Retornaz (ITA)	71	83	73	88	80	81	69	85	78	78

==== Fourth ====
#	Curler	1	2	3	4	5	6	7	8	9	Total
1	Niklas Edin (SWE)	91	96	83	84	99	77	70	86	73	85
1	Kevin Koe (CAN)	86	86	83	88	75	83	83	96	86	85
3	Benoît Schwarz (SUI)	70	78	81	88	80	82	95	90	76	82
4	Amos Mosaner (ITA)	80	94	83	72	72	86	86	58	89	81
5	Thomas Ulsrud (NOR)	78	78	84	83	78	79	64	83	94	80
6	Kyle Smith (GBR)	80	71	84	82	65	72	83	96	72	78
7	Yusuke Morozumi (JPN)	75	84	70	78	91	69	71	89	72	77
7	Kim Chang-min (KOR)	78	69	85	81	79	65	70	86	78	77
7	John Shuster (USA)	82	80	66	82	54	67	82	97	78	77
10	Rasmus Stjerne (DEN)	75	81	79	75	82	76	78	78	48	75

=== Women's tournament ===
Percentages by draw.

==== Lead ====
#	Curler	1	2	3	4	5	6	7	8	9	Total
1	Lisa Weagle (CAN)	91	85	76	86	84	100	93	83	81	86
2	Becca Hamilton (USA)	89	91	85	82	71	84	94	83	85	85
3	Ma Jingyi (CHN)	86	91	89	83	84	88	75	70	94	84
4	Kim Yeong-mi (KOR)	83	79	76	89	—	79	—	96	—	83
4	Julia Guzieva (OAR)	82	76	78	89	85	80	93	77	84	83
4	Sofia Mabergs (SWE)	80	92	83	82	80	79	78	93	83	83
7	Lauren Gray (GBR)	82	86	68	81	83	83	79	85	86	81
8	Marlene Albrecht (SUI)	80	90	81	74	76	88	69	86	75	80
9	Yurika Yoshida (JPN)	74	80	79	72	71	86	74	88	82	78
10	Mathilde Halse (DEN)	81	78	81	69	84	66	68	—	—	74

==== Second ====
#	Curler	1	2	3	4	5	6	7	8	9	Total
1	Agnes Knochenhauer (SWE)	83	83	81	79	86	83	80	94	90	84
2	Galina Arsenkina (OAR)	82	90	80	77	76	79	80	85	88	82
3	Joanne Courtney (CAN)	84	74	80	93	58	82	83	91	78	80
4	Vicki Adams (GBR)	80	75	76	78	91	73	69	76	94	79
5	Manuela Siegrist (SUI)	59	85	79	65	90	80	75	83	83	78
6	Kim Seon-yeong (KOR)	84	64	79	81	86	75	73	85	71	77
6	Aileen Geving (USA)	67	79	79	77	79	75	91	78	71	77
8	Liu Jinli (CHN)	84	75	74	75	75	70	69	80	85	76
9	Julie Høgh (DEN)	83	63	74	78	81	64	76	—	—	74
9	Yumi Suzuki (JPN)	74	71	74	80	78	64	74	80	72	74

==== Third ====
#	Curler	1	2	3	4	5	6	7	8	9	Total
1	Sara McManus (SWE)	88	77	82	78	98	75	91	88	80	84
2	Emma Miskew (CAN)	90	73	77	98	85	84	76	84	76	82
3	Esther Neuenschwander (SUI)	77	93	78	68	85	82	65	89	89	80
4	Tabitha Peterson (USA)	51	80	89	84	68	83	86	69	81	77
5	Kim Kyeong-ae (KOR)	66	64	79	88	80	71	68	90	88	76
5	Anna Sloan (GBR)	79	73	70	84	66	74	80	84	75	76
5	Chinami Yoshida (JPN)	86	65	88	75	86	55	80	75	72	76
5	Zhou Yan (CHN)	78	86	73	77	70	63	61	89	83	76
9	Denise Dupont (DEN)	73	68	69	74	89	74	78	78	66	75
10	Uliana Vasileva (OAR)	68	72	69	83	68	52	—	—	—	70

==== Fourth ====
#	Curler	1	2	3	4	5	6	7	8	9	Total
1	Anna Hasselborg (SWE)	92	81	76	83	89	66	71	95	84	82
2	Kim Eun-jung (KOR)	76	60	80	85	86	63	85	98	80	78
2	Eve Muirhead (GBR)	79	76	74	85	72	81	88	69	83	78
4	Rachel Homan (CAN)	72	77	66	96	83	77	73	79	78	77
5	Nina Roth (USA)	49	88	71	81	71	75	86	79	70	75
6	Satsuki Fujisawa (JPN)	68	76	76	80	92	71	61	55	74	73
6	Silvana Tirinzoni (SUI)	56	79	54	78	73	82	81	84	68	73
6	Wang Bingyu (CHN)	80	81	72	70	75	67	58	72	78	73
9	Victoria Moiseeva (OAR)	50	82	78	74	76	43	80	58	69	70
10	Madeleine Dupont (DEN)	55	57	67	73	61	76	66	82	71	68

=== Mixed doubles tournament ===
Percentages by draw.

==== Female ====
#	Curler	1	2	3	4	5	6	7	Total
1	Kaitlyn Lawes (CAN)	72	70	77	75	77	86	78	76
2	Becca Hamilton (USA)	85	81	69	65	72	54	75	72
2	Wang Rui (CHN)	63	79	59	71	83	70	77	72
4	Anastasia Bryzgalova (OAR)	61	80	72	73	65	60	75	70
4	Kristin Skaslien (NOR)	61	84	63	70	83	56	65	70
6	Jenny Perret (SUI)	76	60	67	81	36	78	66	68
7	Jang Hye-ji (KOR)	71	71	62	63	69	50	52	63
8	Oona Kauste (FIN)	57	52	67	31	75	65	67	60

==== Male ====
#	Curler	1	2	3	4	5	6	7	Total
1	John Morris (CAN)	80	92	73	85	78	90	80	82
2	Magnus Nedregotten (NOR)	79	88	80	89	68	72	64	78
3	Matt Hamilton (USA)	81	80	88	43	80	76	75	76
4	Martin Rios (SUI)	81	73	66	85	71	74	69	74
5	Ba Dexin (CHN)	81	69	68	69	69	73	78	72
6	Tomi Rantamäki (FIN)	64	74	67	71	70	73	75	71
7	Lee Ki-jeong (KOR)	84	78	82	58	67	67	54	70
8	Alexander Krushelnitskiy (OAR)	55	58	63	73	65	63	65	64

==== Team total ====
#	Curler	1	2	3	4	5	6	7	Total
1	Canada	77	83	74	81	78	89	79	80
2	Norway	72	86	74	81	74	66	64	74
2	United States	82	81	80	52	77	68	75	74
4	China	74	73	64	70	74	71	78	72
5	Switzerland	81	71	76	68	55	76	68	71
6	Finland	61	65	67	55	72	72	72	67
6	South Korea	77	72	64	76	71	60	53	67
6	Olympic Athletes from Russia	59	72	68	73	65	61	70	67
