= Norway at the 2018 Winter Olympics =

- Flag of Norway
- IOC code: NOR
- NOC: Norwegian Olympic and Paralympic Committee and Confederation of Sports
- Website: www.idrettsforbundet.no (in Norwegian)

in Pyeongchang, South Korea 9–25 February 2018
- Competitors: 109 (82 men and 27 women) in 11 sports
- Flag bearer: Emil Hegle Svendsen
- Medals Ranked 1st: Gold 14 Silver 14 Bronze 11 Total 39

Winter Olympics appearances (overview)
- 1924; 1928; 1932; 1936; 1948; 1952; 1956; 1960; 1964; 1968; 1972; 1976; 1980; 1984; 1988; 1992; 1994; 1998; 2002; 2006; 2010; 2014; 2018; 2022; 2026

Norway competed at the 2018 Winter Olympics in PyeongChang, South Korea, from 9 to 25 February 2018. It was represented by 109 competitors in 11 sports.

Norway was the most successful nation at the games with 39 total medals, setting a new record for the most medals won by a country at a single Winter Olympics. The previous record of 37 was set by the United States at the 2010 Winter Olympics. Norway, together with Germany, also matched the record of most gold medals at a single Winter Olympics with 14 gold, originally set by Canada at the 2010 Winter Olympics.

Cross-country skier Marit Bjørgen was the most successful athlete of the games, with five medals, while her male colleagues Johannes Høsflot Klæbo, Simen Hegstad Krüger and Martin Johnsrud Sundby won three each. Biathletes Johannes Thingnes Bø and Emil Hegle Svendsen and ski jumper Robert Johansson also won three medals each. Additional nine Norwegian athletes won two medals each: Ragnhild Haga, Johann André Forfang, Håvard Lorentzen, Sverre Lunde Pedersen, Ragnhild Mowinckel, Marte Olsbu, Kjetil Jansrud, Tiril Eckhoff and Maiken Caspersen Falla.

== Medalists ==
Multiple medalists
Name	Sport	1st place, gold medalist(s)	2nd place, silver medalist(s)	3rd place, bronze medalist(s)	Total
Marit Bjørgen	Cross-country skiing	2	1	2	5
Johannes Høsflot Klæbo	Cross-country skiing	3	0	0	3
Simen Hegstad Krüger	Cross-country skiing	2	1	0	3
Martin Johnsrud Sundby	Cross-country skiing	2	1	0	3
Johannes Thingnes Bø	Biathlon	1	2	0	3
Robert Johansson	Ski jumping	1	0	2	3
Emil Hegle Svendsen	Biathlon	0	2	1	3
Ragnhild Haga	Cross-country skiing	2	0	0	2
Johann André Forfang	Ski jumping	1	1	0	2
Havard Lorentzen	Speed skating	1	1	0	2
Sverre Lunde Pedersen	Speed skating	1	0	1	2
Ragnhild Mowinckel	Alpine skiing	0	2	0	2
Marte Olsbu	Biathlon	0	2	0	2
Kjetil Jansrud	Alpine skiing	0	1	1	2
Tiril Eckhoff	Biathlon	0	1	1	2
Maiken Caspersen Falla	Cross-country skiing	0	1	1	2

Medals by gender
Gender	1st place, gold medalist(s)	2nd place, silver medalist(s)	3rd place, bronze medalist(s)	Total
Male	10	8	6	24
Female	4	5	3	11
Mixed	0	1	2	3
Total	14	14	11	39

Medals by sport
Sport	1st place, gold medalist(s)	2nd place, silver medalist(s)	3rd place, bronze medalist(s)	Total
Alpine skiing	1	4	2	7
Biathlon	1	3	2	6
Cross-country skiing	7	4	3	14
Curling	0	0	1	1
Freestyle skiing	1	0	0	1
Nordic combined	0	1	0	1
Ski jumping	2	1	2	5
Speed skating	2	1	1	4
Total	14	14	11	39

Medals by date
Day	Date	1st place, gold medalist(s)	2nd place, silver medalist(s)	3rd place, bronze medalist(s)	Total
Day 1	10 February	0	3	1	4
Day 2	11 February	1	1	2	4
Day 3	12 February	1	0	0	1
Day 4	13 February	1	1	0	2
Day 5	14 February	0	0	0	0
Day 6	15 February	3	2	1	6
Day 7	16 February	0	1	1	2
Day 8	17 February	1	0	2	3
Day 9	18 February	2	1	1	4
Day 10	19 February	2	0	0	2
Day 11	20 February	0	1	0	1
Day 12	21 February	2	1	1	4
Day 13	22 February	0	1	1	2
Day 14	23 February	0	2	0	2
Day 15	24 February	0	0	1	1
Day 16	25 February	1	0	0	1
Total		14	14	11	39

Medal	Name	Sport	Event	Date
Gold	Simen Hegstad Krüger	Cross-country skiing	Men's 30 km skiathlon	11 February
Gold	Maren Lundby	Ski jumping	Women's normal hill individual	12 February
Gold	Johannes Høsflot Klæbo	Cross-country skiing	Men's sprint	13 February
Gold	Ragnhild Haga	Cross-country skiing	Women's 10 km freestyle	15 February
Gold	Johannes Thingnes Bø	Biathlon	Men's individual	15 February
Gold	Aksel Lund Svindal	Alpine skiing	Men's downhill	15 February
Gold	Ingvild Flugstad Østberg; Astrid Uhrenholdt Jacobsen; Ragnhild Haga; Marit Bjørgen	Cross-country skiing	Women's 4 × 5 km relay	17 February
Gold	Øystein Bråten	Freestyle skiing	Men's slopestyle	18 February
Gold	Didrik Tønseth; Martin Johnsrud Sundby; Simen Hegstad Krüger; Johannes Høsflot Klæbo	Cross-country skiing	Men's 4 × 10 km relay	18 February
Gold	Håvard Lorentzen	Speed skating	Men's 500 m	19 February
Gold	Johann André Forfang; Robert Johansson; Andreas Stjernen; Daniel-André Tande	Ski jumping	Men's large hill team	19 February
Gold	Martin Johnsrud Sundby; Johannes Høsflot Klæbo	Cross-country skiing	Men's team sprint	21 February
Gold	Håvard Bøkko; Sindre Henriksen; Simen Spieler Nilsen; Sverre Lunde Pedersen	Speed skating	Men's team pursuit	21 February
Gold	Marit Bjørgen	Cross-country skiing	Women's 30 km classical	25 February
Silver	Kjetil Jansrud	Alpine skiing	Men's downhill	15 February
Silver	Ragnhild Mowinckel	Alpine skiing	Women's giant slalom	15 February
Silver	Ragnhild Mowinckel	Alpine skiing	Women's downhill	21 February
Silver	Marit Bjørgen	Cross-country skiing	Women's 15 km skiathlon	10 February
Silver	Marte Olsbu	Biathlon	Women's sprint	10 February
Silver	Johann André Forfang	Ski jumping	Men's normal hill individual	10 February
Silver	Martin Johnsrud Sundby	Cross-country skiing	Men's 30 km skiathlon	11 February
Silver	Simen Hegstad Krüger	Cross-country skiing	Men's 15 kilometre freestyle	16 February
Silver	Maiken Caspersen Falla	Cross-country skiing	Women's sprint	13 February
Silver	Henrik Kristoffersen	Alpine skiing	Men's giant slalom	18 February
Silver	Marte Olsbu; Tiril Eckhoff; Johannes Thingnes Bø; Emil Hegle Svendsen	Biathlon	Mixed relay	20 February
Silver	Jørgen Graabak; Espen Andersen; Jarl Magnus Riiber; Jan Schmid	Nordic Combined	Team large hill/4×5km	22 February
Silver	Håvard Lorentzen	Speed skating	Men's 1000 m	23 February
Silver	Lars Helge Birkeland; Tarjei Bø; Johannes Thingnes Bø; Emil Hegle Svendsen	Biathlon	Men's relay	23 February
Bronze	Robert Johansson	Ski jumping	Men's normal hill individual	10 February
Bronze	Sverre Lunde Pedersen	Speed skating	Men's 5000 m	11 February
Bronze	Hans Christer Holund	Cross-country skiing	Men's 30 km skiathlon	11 February
Bronze	Marit Bjørgen	Cross-country skiing	Women's 10 kilometre freestyle	15 February
Bronze	Kjetil Jansrud	Alpine skiing	Men's super-G	16 February
Bronze	Tiril Eckhoff	Biathlon	Women's mass start	17 February
Bronze	Robert Johansson	Ski jumping	Men's large hill individual	17 February
Bronze	Emil Hegle Svendsen	Biathlon	Men's mass start	18 February
Bronze	Marit Bjørgen; Maiken Caspersen Falla	Cross-country skiing	Women's team sprint	21 February
Bronze	Kristin Skaslien; Magnus Nedregotten	Curling	Mixed doubles	22 February
Bronze	Kristin Lysdahl; Leif Kristian Nestvold-Haugen; Nina Haver-Løseth; Sebastian Foss-Solevåg; Maren Skjøld; Jonathan Nordbotten	Alpine skiing	Team event	24 February

== Outline ==
Prior to the games, the Norwegian Olympic sports authority Olympiatoppen announced an official goal of winning 30 medals and making it into the top three on the medal table.

== Competitors ==
The following is the list of number of competitors participating at the Games per sport/discipline.

Sport	Men	Women	Total
Alpine skiing	7	4	11
Biathlon	6	5	11
Cross-country skiing	11	9	20
Curling	6	1	7
Freestyle skiing	5	3	8
Ice hockey	25	0	25
Nordic combined	5	0	5
Skeleton	1	0	1
Ski jumping	5	2	7
Snowboarding	4	1	5
Speed skating	7	2	9
Total	82	27	109

== Alpine skiing ==
Men

Athlete	Event	Run 1		Run 2		Total	
Athlete	Event	Time	Rank	Time	Rank	Time	Rank
Sebastian Foss-Solevåg	Combined	1:24.35	58	DNF			
Sebastian Foss-Solevåg	Slalom	48.53	5	51.65	20	1:40.18	10
Leif Kristian Haugen	Giant slalom	1:08.93	3	1:11.30	25	2:20.23	8
Leif Kristian Haugen	Slalom	49.27	14	51.04	7	1:40.31	13
Kjetil Jansrud	Downhill	—N/a				1:40.37	2nd place, silver medalist(s)
Kjetil Jansrud	Super-G	—N/a				1:24.62	3rd place, bronze medalist(s)
Kjetil Jansrud	Combined	1:19.51	4	49.16	19	2:08.67	7
Kjetil Jansrud	Giant slalom	DNF					
Aleksander Aamodt Kilde	Downhill	—N/a				1:42.18	15
Aleksander Aamodt Kilde	Super-G	—N/a				1:25.71	13
Aleksander Aamodt Kilde	Combined	1:20.92	18	50.15	26	2:11.07	21
Aleksander Aamodt Kilde	Giant slalom	DNF					
Henrik Kristoffersen	Giant slalom	1:09.58	10	1:09.73	1	2:19.31	2nd place, silver medalist(s)
Henrik Kristoffersen	Slalom	47.72	1	DNF			
Jonathan Nordbotten	Slalom	DNF					
Aksel Lund Svindal	Downhill	—N/a				1:40.25	1st place, gold medalist(s)
Aksel Lund Svindal	Super-G	—N/a				1:24.93	5
Aksel Lund Svindal	Combined	1:19.31	2	DNS		DNF	

Women

Athlete	Event	Run 1		Run 2		Total	
Athlete	Event	Time	Rank	Time	Rank	Time	Rank
Nina Haver-Løseth	Giant slalom	1:13.13	18	1:09.97	13	2:23.10	15
Nina Haver-Løseth	Slalom	49.75	5	50.41	11	1:40.16	6
Kristin Lysdahl	Giant slalom	1:13.45	21	1:09.95	12	2:23.40	18
Kristin Lysdahl	Slalom	52.12	28	50.90	21	1:43.02	25
Ragnhild Mowinckel	Downhill	—N/a				1:39.31	2nd place, silver medalist(s)
Ragnhild Mowinckel	Super-G	—N/a				1:22.00	13
Ragnhild Mowinckel	Giant slalom	1:11.17	4	1:09.24	5	2:20.41	2nd place, silver medalist(s)
Ragnhild Mowinckel	Combined	1:40.11	2	42.52	11	2:22.63	4
Maren Skjøld	Giant slalom	DNF					
Maren Skjøld	Slalom	51.44	19	51.18	23	1:42.62	22

Mixed

Athlete	Event	Round of 16	Quarterfinals	Semifinals	Final / BM	
Athlete	Event	Opposition Result	Opposition Result	Opposition Result	Opposition Result	Rank
Sebastian Foss-Solevåg; Leif Kristian Haugen; Jonathan Nordbotten; Nina Haver-Løseth; Kristin Lysdahl; Maren Skjøld	Team	Olympic Athletes from Russia; W 4–0	Great Britain; W 2*–2	Austria; L 1–3	France; W 2*–2	3rd place, bronze medalist(s)

== Biathlon ==
Based on their Nations Cup rankings in the 2016–17 Biathlon World Cup, Norway has qualified 6 men and 5 women.

Men

Athlete	Event	Time	Misses	Rank
Lars Helge Birkeland	Individual	53:46.8	4 (2+1+1+0)	60
Erlend Bjøntegaard	Sprint	23:56.2	2 (0+2)	5
Erlend Bjøntegaard	Pursuit	34:18.0	4 (1+0+0+3)	9
Erlend Bjøntegaard	Mass start	36:19.4	2 (0+0+2+0)	7
Johannes Thingnes Bø	Sprint	24:51.5	4 (3+1)	31
Johannes Thingnes Bø	Pursuit	35:42.7	6 (0+2+4+0)	21
Johannes Thingnes Bø	Individual	48:03.8	2 (1+0+0+1)	1st place, gold medalist(s)
Johannes Thingnes Bø	Mass start	37:07.3	3 (0+3+0+0)	16
Tarjei Bø	Sprint	24:12.5	2 (2+0)	13
Tarjei Bø	Pursuit	33:54.3	3 (0+0+1+2)	4
Tarjei Bø	Individual	50:05.3	2 (0+0+0+2)	13
Tarjei Bø	Mass start	36:21.9	3 (1+0+2+0)	8
Emil Hegle Svendsen	Sprint	24:23.8	2 (1+1)	18
Emil Hegle Svendsen	Pursuit	35:33.2	5 (0+2+2+1)	20
Emil Hegle Svendsen	Individual	49:40.5	2 (0+2+0+0)	10
Emil Hegle Svendsen	Mass start	35:58.5	2 (1+0+1+0)	3rd place, bronze medalist(s)
Lars Helge Birkeland; Tarjei Bø; Johannes Thingnes Bø; Emil Hegle Svendsen	Team relay	1:16:12.0	13 (1+12)	2nd place, silver medalist(s)

Women

Athlete	Event	Time	Misses	Rank
Tiril Eckhoff	Sprint	22:32.4	4 (3+1)	24
Tiril Eckhoff	Pursuit	32:23.1	5 (0+2+3+0)	9
Tiril Eckhoff	Individual	44:41.9	4 (1+1+1+1)	23
Tiril Eckhoff	Mass start	35:50.7	2 (1+0+1+0)	3rd place, bronze medalist(s)
Marte Olsbu	Sprint	21:30.4	1 (1+0)	2nd place, silver medalist(s)
Marte Olsbu	Pursuit	31:42.6	4 (1+2+0+1)	4
Marte Olsbu	Individual	48:58.8	7 (1+1+3+2)	71
Marte Olsbu	Mass start	36:14.6	1 (0+1+0+0)	8
Synnøve Solemdal	Sprint	23:23.9	3 (1+2)	50
Synnøve Solemdal	Pursuit	34:45.5	4 (1+0+2+1)	41
Synnøve Solemdal	Individual	45:33.0	2 (0+1+0+1)	40
Ingrid Landmark Tandrevold	Sprint	23:49.1	4 (2+2)	59
Ingrid Landmark Tandrevold	Pursuit	34:56.8	4 (0+3+1+0)	42
Ingrid Landmark Tandrevold	Individual	46:14.7	3 (0+2+0+1)	43
Synnøve Solemdal; Tiril Eckhoff; Ingrid Landmark Tandrevold; Marte Olsbu	Team relay	1:12:33.1	15 (3+12)	4

Mixed

Athlete	Event	Time	Misses	Rank
Johannes Thingnes Bø; Emil Hegle Svendsen; Tiril Eckhoff; Marte Olsbu	Team relay	1:08:55.2	12 (1+11)	2nd place, silver medalist(s)

== Cross-country skiing ==
Distance
Men

Athlete	Event	Classical		Freestyle		Final		
Athlete	Event	Time	Rank	Time	Rank	Time	Deficit	Rank
Niklas Dyrhaug	50 km classical	—N/a				2:13:20.5	+4:58.4	13
Emil Iversen	50 km classical	—N/a				2:12:59.0	+4:36.9	10
Hans Christer Holund	15 km freestyle	—N/a				34:18.4	+34.5	6
Hans Christer Holund	30 km skiathlon	41:01.8	7	40:33.3	5	1:16:29.9	+9.9	3rd place, bronze medalist(s)
Hans Christer Holund	50 km classical	—N/a				2:11:12.2	+2:50.1	6
Johannes Høsflot Klæbo	30 km skiathlon	40:31.8	5	36:04.8	18	1:17:03.4	+43.4	10
Finn Hågen Krogh	15 km freestyle	—N/a				35:14.4	+1:30.5	18
Simen Hegstad Krüger	15 km freestyle	—N/a				34:02.2	+18.3	2nd place, silver medalist(s)
Simen Hegstad Krüger	30 km skiathlon	41:13.8	14	35:06.2	1	1:16:20.0	+0.0	1st place, gold medalist(s)
Martin Johnsrud Sundby	15 km freestyle	—N/a				34:08.8	+24.9	4
Martin Johnsrud Sundby	30 km skiathlon	40:30.5	5	35:22.4	2	1:16:28.0	+8.0	2nd place, silver medalist(s)
Martin Johnsrud Sundby	50 km classical	—N/a				2:11:05.8	+2:43.7	5
Johannes Høsflot Klæbo; Simen Hegstad Krüger; Martin Johnsrud Sundby; Didrik Tønseth	4 × 10 km relay	—N/a				1:33:04.9	+0.0	1st place, gold medalist(s)

Women

Athlete	Event	Classical		Freestyle		Final		
Athlete	Event	Time	Rank	Time	Rank	Time	Deficit	Rank
Marit Bjørgen	10 km freestyle	—N/a				25:32.4	+31.9	3rd place, bronze medalist(s)
Marit Bjørgen	15 km skiathlon	21:23.1	1	18:58.6	2	40:52.7	+7.8	2nd place, silver medalist(s)
Marit Bjørgen	30 km classical	—N/a				1:22:17.6	+0.0	1st place, gold medalist(s)
Ragnhild Haga	10 km freestyle	—N/a				25:00.5	+0.0	1st place, gold medalist(s)
Ragnhild Haga	15 km skiathlon	21:40.2	16	19:53.7	16	42:07.6	+1:22.7	15
Ragnhild Haga	30 km classical	—N/a				1:27:11.5	+4:53.9	12
Ingvild Flugstad Østberg	10 km freestyle	—N/a				26:06.0	+1:05.5	7
Ingvild Flugstad Østberg	15 km skiathlon	21:24.3	4	19:50.4	14	41:43.2	+58.3	11
Ingvild Flugstad Østberg	30 km classical	—N/a				1:24:18.0	+2:00.4	4
Heidi Weng	10 km freestyle	—N/a				26:25.1	+1:24.6	11
Heidi Weng	15 km skiathlon	21:23.8	3	19:33.7	9	41:25.6	+40.7	9
Heidi Weng	30 km classical	—N/a				1:26:25.5	+4:07.9	8
Marit Bjørgen; Ragnhild Haga; Astrid Uhrenholdt Jacobsen; Ingvild Flugstad Østberg	4 × 5 km relay	—N/a				51:24.3	+0.0	1st place, gold medalist(s)

Sprint
Men

Athlete	Event	Qualification		Quarterfinals		Semifinals		Final	
Athlete	Event	Time	Rank	Time	Rank	Time	Rank	Time	Rank
Eirik Brandsdal	Sprint	3:15.95	18 Q	3:18.25	5	did not advance			22
Pål Golberg	Sprint	3:13.71	11 Q	3:11.07	2 Q	3:07.24	4 Q	3:09.56	4
Emil Iversen	Sprint	3:14.36	12 Q	3:10.21	2 Q	3:14.09	4	DNA	8
Johannes Høsflot Klæbo	Sprint	3:08.73	2 Q	3:11.09	1 Q	3:06.01	1 Q	3:05.75	1st place, gold medalist(s)
Johannes Høsflot Klæbo; Martin Johnsrud Sundby	Team sprint	—N/a				16:03.97	1 Q	15:56.26	1st place, gold medalist(s)

Women

Athlete	Event	Qualification		Quarterfinals		Semifinals		Final	
Athlete	Event	Time	Rank	Time	Rank	Time	Rank	Time	Rank
Maiken Caspersen Falla	Sprint	3:09.13	2 Q	3:11.98	1 Q	3:10.55	2 Q	3:06.87	2nd place, silver medalist(s)
Kathrine Harsem	Sprint	3:18.48	18 Q	3:14.87	4	did not advance			18
Ingvild Flugstad Østberg	Sprint	3:17.35	13 Q	3:14.87	4	did not advance			17
Heidi Weng	Sprint	3:16.28	10 Q	3:15.68	2 Q	3:16.22	6	DNA	11
Marit Bjørgen; Maiken Caspersen Falla	Team sprint	—N/a				16:33.28	1 Q	15:59.44	3rd place, bronze medalist(s)

== Curling ==
Norway has qualified seven athletes.

Summary

Team	Event	Group stage										Tiebreaker	Semifinal	Final / BM	
Team	Event	Opposition Score	Opposition Score	Opposition Score	Opposition Score	Opposition Score	Opposition Score	Opposition Score	Opposition Score	Opposition Score	Rank	Opposition Score	Opposition Score	Opposition Score	Rank
Thomas Ulsrud; Torger Nergård; Christoffer Svae; Håvard Vad Petersson; Sander Rølvåg	Men's tournament	(Japan) JPN; L 4–6	(Canada) CAN; L 4–7	(South Korea) KOR; W 7–5	(Switzerland) SUI; L 5–7	(Denmark) DEN; W 10–8	(United States) USA; W 8–5	(United Kingdom) GBR; L 3–10	(Italy) ITA; L 4–6	(Sweden) SWE; W 7–2	6	Did not advance			
Kristin Skaslien; Magnus Nedregotten	Mixed doubles	(Canada) CAN; W 9–6	(International Olympic Committee) OAR; L 3–4	(South Korea) KOR; W 8–3	(Switzerland) SUI; W 6–5	(Finland) FIN; W 7–6	(United States) USA; L 3–10	(China) CHN; L 3–9	—N/a		4 TB	(China) CHN; W 9–7	(Canada) CAN; L 4–8	(International Olympic Committee) OAR; W (DSQ)	3rd place, bronze medalist(s)

=== Men's tournament ===
Norway has qualified a men's team by earning enough points in the last two World Curling Championships.

Final round robin standings
Team	Skip	Pld	W	L	PF	PA	EW	EL	BE	SE	S%	Qualification
Sweden	Niklas Edin	9	7	2	62	43	34	28	13	8	87%	Playoffs
Canada	Kevin Koe	9	6	3	56	46	36	34	14	8	87%	Playoffs
United States	John Shuster	9	5	4	67	63	37	39	4	6	80%	Playoffs
Great Britain	Kyle Smith	9	5	4	55	60	40	37	8	7	82%	Tiebreaker
Switzerland	Peter de Cruz	9	5	4	60	55	39	37	10	6	83%	Tiebreaker
Norway	Thomas Ulsrud	9	4	5	52	56	34	39	7	8	82%	
South Korea	Kim Chang-min	9	4	5	65	63	39	39	8	8	82%	
Japan	Yusuke Morozumi	9	4	5	48	56	33	35	13	5	81%	
Italy	Joël Retornaz	9	3	6	50	56	37	38	15	7	81%	
Denmark	Rasmus Stjerne	9	2	7	53	70	36	39	12	5	83%	

Round-robin

Norway has a bye in draws 1, 5 and 9.

Draw 2

Wednesday, 14 February, 20:05

Sheet D	1	2	3	4	5	6	7	8	9	10	Final
Norway (Ulsrud) 🔨	1	0	0	0	1	1	0	1	0	X	4
Japan (Morozumi)	0	1	1	1	0	0	2	0	1	X	6

Draw 3

Thursday, 15 February, 14:05

Sheet B	1	2	3	4	5	6	7	8	9	10	Final
Norway (Ulsrud)	0	1	1	0	0	2	0	0	0	X	4
Canada (Koe) 🔨	2	0	0	0	1	0	1	1	2	X	7

Draw 4

Friday, 16 February, 09:05

Sheet C	1	2	3	4	5	6	7	8	9	10	Final
Norway (Ulsrud) 🔨	0	2	0	0	2	0	0	2	0	1	7
South Korea (Kim)	1	0	0	1	0	1	0	0	2	0	5

Draw 6

Saturday, 17 February, 14:05

Sheet B	1	2	3	4	5	6	7	8	9	10	Final
Switzerland (de Cruz)	1	0	0	1	0	0	2	0	2	1	7
Norway (Ulsrud) 🔨	0	1	1	0	0	2	0	1	0	0	5

Draw 7

Sunday, 18 February, 09:05

Sheet A	1	2	3	4	5	6	7	8	9	10	Final
Norway (Ulsrud)	0	1	0	4	0	4	0	0	1	0	10
Denmark (Stjerne) 🔨	1	0	1	0	1	0	2	2	0	1	8

Draw 8

Sunday, 18 February, 20:05

Sheet D	1	2	3	4	5	6	7	8	9	10	Final
United States (Shuster) 🔨	1	0	2	0	1	0	0	0	1	X	5
Norway (Ulsrud)	0	2	0	1	0	3	1	1	0	X	8

Draw 10

Tuesday, 20 February, 09:05

Sheet A	1	2	3	4	5	6	7	8	9	10	Final
Great Britain (Smith) 🔨	3	1	0	2	0	3	1	X	X	X	10
Norway (Ulsrud)	0	0	2	0	1	0	0	X	X	X	3

Draw 11

Tuesday, 20 February, 20:05

Sheet B	1	2	3	4	5	6	7	8	9	10	Final
Norway (Ulsrud)	0	0	1	1	0	0	0	1	0	1	4
Italy (Retornaz) 🔨	0	1	0	0	0	1	1	0	3	0	6

Draw 12

Wednesday, 21 February, 14:05

Sheet C	1	2	3	4	5	6	7	8	9	10	Final
Sweden (Edin) 🔨	0	0	2	0	0	0	X	X	X	X	2
Norway (Ulsrud)	1	0	0	3	2	1	X	X	X	X	7

=== Mixed doubles ===
Norway has qualified a mixed doubles team by earning enough points in the last two World Mixed Doubles Curling Championships. Norway eventually finished in 4th place behind OAR, but on 22 February it was confirmed that the male OAR competitor had tested positive for meldonium, a banned substance. This meant that the OAR team would be stripped of their medal, and Norway would instead receive the bronze medal for mixed doubles curling.

Final round robin standings
Team	Athletes	Pld	W	L	PF	PA	EW	EL	BE	SE	S%	Qualification
Canada	Kaitlyn Lawes / John Morris	7	6	1	52	26	28	20	0	9	80%	Playoffs
Switzerland	Jenny Perret / Martin Rios	7	5	2	45	40	29	26	0	10	71%	Playoffs
Olympic Athletes from Russia	Anastasia Bryzgalova / Alexander Krushelnitskiy	7	4	3	36	44	26	27	1	7	67%	Playoffs
Norway	Kristin Skaslien / Magnus Nedregotten	7	4	3	39	43	26	25	1	8	74%	Tiebreaker
China	Wang Rui / Ba Dexin	7	4	3	47	42	27	27	1	6	72%	Tiebreaker
South Korea	Jang Hye-ji / Lee Ki-jeong	7	2	5	40	40	23	29	1	7	67%	
United States	Rebecca Hamilton / Matt Hamilton	7	2	5	37	43	26	25	0	9	74%	
Finland	Oona Kauste / Tomi Rantamäki	7	1	6	35	53	23	29	0	6	67%	

Draw 1

Thursday, February 8, 9:05

Sheet B	1	2	3	4	5	6	7	8	Final
Canada (Lawes / Morris) 🔨	1	0	3	0	2	0	0	0	6
Norway (Skaslien / Nedregotten)	0	3	0	1	0	2	1	2	9

Draw 2

Thursday, February 8, 20:04

Sheet C	1	2	3	4	5	6	7	8	Final
Olympic Athletes from Russia (Bryzgalova / Krushelnitskiy)	0	1	0	1	1	0	0	1	4
Norway (Skaslien / Nedregotten) 🔨	0	0	1	0	0	1	1	0	3

Draw 3

Friday, February 9, 8:35

Sheet A	1	2	3	4	5	6	7	8	Final
South Korea (Jang / Lee)	0	0	0	1	0	2	0	X	3
Norway (Skaslien / Nedregotten) 🔨	1	3	1	0	1	0	2	X	8

Draw 4

Friday, February 9, 13:35

Sheet D	1	2	3	4	5	6	7	8	Final
Switzerland (Perret / Rios)	1	0	0	2	1	0	1	0	5
Norway (Skaslien / Nedregotten) 🔨	0	3	1	0	0	1	0	1	6

Draw 5

Saturday, February 10, 9:05

Sheet B	1	2	3	4	5	6	7	8	9	Final
Norway (Skaslien / Nedregotten)	1	0	1	0	3	0	1	0	1	7
Finland (Kauste / Rantamäki) 🔨	0	2	0	1	0	2	0	1	0	6

Draw 6

Saturday, February 10, 20:04

Sheet C	1	2	3	4	5	6	7	8	Final
Norway (Skaslien / Nedregotten)	0	3	0	0	0	0	X	X	3
United States (R. Hamilton / M. Hamilton) 🔨	1	0	1	4	1	3	X	X	10

Draw 7

Sunday, February 11, 9:05

Sheet A	1	2	3	4	5	6	7	8	Final
Norway (Skaslien / Nedregotten)	0	1	1	0	1	0	X	X	3
China (Wang / Ba) 🔨	1	0	0	3	0	5	X	X	9

Tiebreaker

Sunday, February 11, 20:05

Team	1	2	3	4	5	6	7	8	Final
China (Wang / Ba) 🔨	2	0	1	0	2	0	2	0	7
Norway (Skaslien / Nedregotten)	0	3	0	1	0	4	0	1	9

Semifinal

Monday, February 12, 9:05

Sheet A	1	2	3	4	5	6	7	8	Final
Canada (Lawes / Morris) 🔨	2	0	0	1	2	0	3	X	8
Norway (Skaslien / Nedregotten)	0	1	1	0	0	2	0	X	4

Bronze-medal game

Tuesday, February 13, 9:05

Sheet B	1	2	3	4	5	6	7	8	Final
Olympic Athletes from Russia (Bryzgalova / Krushelnitskiy) 🔨	2	1	0	2	0	1	1	1	DSQ
Norway (Skaslien / Nedregotten)	0	0	2	0	2	0	0	0	W

Notes

- Olympic Athletes from Russia (which won the bronze medal match 8–4) were disqualified after the tournament due to the doping case.

== Freestyle skiing ==
Moguls

Athlete	Event	Qualification								Final											
Athlete	Event	Run 1				Run 2				Run 1				Run 2				Run 3			
Athlete	Event	Time	Points	Total	Rank	Time	Points	Total	Rank	Time	Points	Total	Rank	Time	Points	Total	Rank	Time	Points	Total	Rank
Vinjar Slatten	Men's moguls	did not finish				25.16	63.09	77.49	2 Q	24.99	64.13	79.18	8 Q	24.31	62.93	78.87	5 Q	26.71	20.83	33.61	6
Hedvig Wessel	Women's moguls	29.70	54.11	68.64	18	30.03	57.50	71.66	5 Q	29.99	54.57	68.77	19	Did not advance							

Slopestyle

Athlete	Event	Qualification				Final				
Athlete	Event	Run 1	Run 2	Best	Rank	Run 1	Run 2	Run 3	Best	Rank
Øystein Bråten	Men's slopestyle	83.20	93.80	93.80	4 Q	95.00	46.40	24.00	95.00	1st place, gold medalist(s)
Ferdinand Dahl	Men's slopestyle	46.60	89.00	89.00	10 Q	42.20	76.40	41.80	76.40	8
Christian Nummedal	Men's slopestyle	27.00	29.20	29.20	28	did not advance				
Felix Stridsberg-Usterud	Men's slopestyle	14.60	84.20	84.20	14	did not advance				
Johanne Killi	Women's slopestyle	87.80	64.20	87.80	3 Q	10.20	76.80	54.40	76.80	5
Tiril Sjåstad Christiansen	Women's slopestyle	55.80	89.00	89.00	2 Q	5.20	24.00	60.40	60.40	9

== Ice hockey ==
Summary

Key:

- OT – Overtime
- GWS – Match decided by penalty-shootout

Team	Event	Group stage				Qualification playoff	Quarterfinal	Semifinal	Final / BM	
Team	Event	Opposition Score	Opposition Score	Opposition Score	Rank	Opposition Score	Opposition Score	Opposition Score	Opposition Score	Rank
Norway men's	Men's tournament	Sweden; L 0–4	Finland; L 1–5	Germany; L 1–2 GWS	4	Slovenia; W 2–1 OT	Olympic Athletes from Russia; L 1–6	Did not advance		8

=== Men's tournament ===
Norway men's national ice hockey team qualified by winning the final qualification tournament in Oslo, Norway.

Team roster

The following is the roster of the Norway national team for the men's ice hockey tournament at the 2018 Winter Olympics.

Head coach: (Norway) Petter Thoresen Assistant coach: (Norway) Sjur Robert Nilsen

No.	Pos.	Name	Height	Weight	Birthdate	Birthplace	2017–18 team
4	D	Johannes Johannesen	1.81 m (5 ft 11 in)	87 kg (192 lb)	1 March 1997	Stavanger	(Norway) Stavanger Oilers (GET-ligaen)
5	D	Erlend Lesund	1.90 m (6 ft 3 in)	93 kg (205 lb)	11 December 1994	Oslo	(Sweden) Mora IK (SHL)
6	D	Jonas Holøs – C	1.80 m (5 ft 11 in)	92 kg (203 lb)	27 August 1987	Sarpsborg	(Switzerland) HC Fribourg-Gottéron (NL)
8	F	Mathias Trettenes	1.80 m (5 ft 11 in)	82 kg (181 lb)	8 November 1993	Stavanger	(Norway) Stavanger Oilers (GET-ligaen)
10	D	Mattias Nørstebø	1.78 m (5 ft 10 in)	82 kg (181 lb)	3 June 1995	Trondheim	(Sweden) Frölunda HC (SHL)
15	F	Tommy Kristiansen	1.89 m (6 ft 2 in)	100 kg (220 lb)	26 May 1989	Sarpsborg	(Norway) Sparta Warriors (GET-ligaen)
16	F	Eirik Salsten	1.84 m (6 ft 0 in)	87 kg (192 lb)	17 June 1994	Oslo	(Norway) Stavanger Oilers (GET-ligaen)
17	D	Stefan Espeland	1.82 m (6 ft 0 in)	84 kg (185 lb)	24 March 1989	Oslo	(Norway) Vålerenga Ishockey (GET-ligaen)
20	F	Anders Bastiansen	1.90 m (6 ft 3 in)	95 kg (209 lb)	31 October 1980	Asker	(Norway) Frisk Asker (GET-ligaen)
21	F	Steffen Thoresen	1.80 m (5 ft 11 in)	90 kg (200 lb)	3 June 1985	Oslo	(Norway) Storhamar Ishockey (GET-ligaen)
22	F	Martin Røymark	1.84 m (6 ft 0 in)	87 kg (192 lb)	10 November 1986	Oslo	(Sweden) Modo Hockey (HA)
26	F	Kristian Forsberg	1.85 m (6 ft 1 in)	92 kg (203 lb)	5 May 1986	Oslo	(Norway) Stavanger Oilers (GET-ligaen)
27	F	Ludvig Hoff	1.80 m (5 ft 11 in)	87 kg (192 lb)	16 October 1996	Oslo	(United States) North Dakota Fighting Hawks (NCHC)
28	F	Niklas Roest	1.74 m (5 ft 9 in)	82 kg (181 lb)	3 August 1986	Oslo	(Norway) Sparta Warriors (GET-ligaen)
30	G	Lars Haugen	1.84 m (6 ft 0 in)	86 kg (190 lb)	19 March 1987	Oslo	(Sweden) Färjestad BK (SHL)
33	G	Henrik Haukeland	1.88 m (6 ft 2 in)	86 kg (190 lb)	6 December 1994	Fredrikstad	(Sweden) Timrå IK (HA)
38	G	Henrik Holm	1.86 m (6 ft 1 in)	84 kg (185 lb)	6 September 1990	Fredrikstad	(Norway) Stavanger Oilers (GET-ligaen)
40	F	Ken André Olimb	1.78 m (5 ft 10 in)	80 kg (180 lb)	21 January 1989	Oslo	(Sweden) Linköpings HC (SHL)
41	F	Patrick Thoresen – A	1.80 m (5 ft 11 in)	92 kg (203 lb)	7 November 1983	Oslo	(Russia) SKA Saint Petersburg (KHL)
42	D	Henrik Ødegaard	1.80 m (5 ft 11 in)	90 kg (200 lb)	12 February 1988	Asker	(Norway) Frisk Asker (GET-ligaen)
46	F	Mathis Olimb – A	1.78 m (5 ft 10 in)	80 kg (180 lb)	1 February 1986	Oslo	(Sweden) Linköpings HC (SHL)
47	D	Alexander Bonsaksen	1.80 m (5 ft 11 in)	85 kg (187 lb)	24 January 1987	Oslo	(Germany) Iserlohn Roosters (DEL)
51	F	Mats Rosseli Olsen	1.80 m (5 ft 11 in)	82 kg (181 lb)	29 April 1991	Oslo	(Sweden) Frölunda HC (SHL)
61	F	Aleksander Reichenberg	1.85 m (6 ft 1 in)	81 kg (179 lb)	13 June 1992	Mora, Sweden	(Czech Republic) HC Sparta Praha (ELH)
90	D	Daniel Sørvik	1.83 m (6 ft 0 in)	92 kg (203 lb)	11 March 1990	Oslo	(Czech Republic) HC Litvínov (ELH)

Preliminary round

Pos	Team	Pld	W	OTW	OTL	L	GF	GA	GD	Pts	Qualification
1	Sweden	3	3	0	0	0	8	1	+7	9	Quarterfinals
2	Finland	3	2	0	0	1	11	6	+5	6	Qualification playoffs
3	Germany	3	0	1	0	2	4	7	−3	2	Qualification playoffs
4	Norway	3	0	0	1	2	2	11	−9	1	Qualification playoffs

Source: IIHF

15 February 2018; 16:40	Norway	0–4 (0–2, 0–0, 0–2)	Sweden	Gangneung Hockey Centre, Gangneung; Attendance: 3,961

Game reference

Lars Haugen
Goalies
Viktor Fasth
Referees:
(Russia) Roman Gofman
(Switzerland) Tobias Wehrli
Linesmen:
(Russia) Gleb Lazarev
(United States) Judson Ritter

0–1	05:29 – Lindholm (Omark, Möller)
0–2	16:46 – Lander (Bertilsson)
0–3	48:42 – Everberg (Omark, Fransson)
0–4	49:04 – Wikstrand (Omark, Everberg)

14 min
Penalties
12 min
17
Shots
27

16 February 2018; 21:10	Finland	5–1 (1–1, 1–0, 3–0)	Norway	Gangneung Hockey Centre, Gangneung; Attendance: 4,180

Game reference

Mikko Koskinen
Goalies
Lars Haugen
Referees:
(Czech Republic) Jan Hribik
(Canada) Brett Iverson
Linesmen:
(Sweden) Jimmy Dahmen
(United States) Fraser McIntyre

	0–1	06:29 – P. Thoresen (Kristiansen, K.A. Olimb) (PP)
Tolvanen (Lepistö) (PP) – 16:36	1–1
Tolvanen (Peltola) – 25:32	2–1
Savinainen (Koskiranta) – 42:59	3–1
Lepistö (Kontiola) (PP) – 47:54	4–1
Manninen (Kontiola) – 56:48	5–1

8 min
Penalties
12 min
30
Shots
22

18 February 2018; 12:10	Germany	2–1 GWS (0–0, 1–0, 0–1) (OT: 0–0) (SO: 1–0)	Norway	Gangneung Hockey Centre, Gangneung; Attendance: 5,534

Game reference
Danny aus den Birken	Goalies	Lars Haugen	Referees: (United States) Mark Lemelin (Finland) Anssi Salonen; Linesmen: (Sweden) Jimmy Dahmen (Russia) Alexander Otmakhov
Hager (Kahun, Macek) (PP) – 32:53 / 1–0; / 1–1 / 45:19 – Reichenberg (Holøs, Bastiansen)			Referees: (United States) Mark Lemelin (Finland) Anssi Salonen; Linesmen: (Sweden) Jimmy Dahmen (Russia) Alexander Otmakhov
Hager; Plachta; Kahun	Shootout	(miss) Bastiansen; (miss) Reichenberg; (miss) M. Olimb	Referees: (United States) Mark Lemelin (Finland) Anssi Salonen; Linesmen: (Sweden) Jimmy Dahmen (Russia) Alexander Otmakhov
10 min	Penalties	55 min	Referees: (United States) Mark Lemelin (Finland) Anssi Salonen; Linesmen: (Sweden) Jimmy Dahmen (Russia) Alexander Otmakhov
38	Shots	29	Referees: (United States) Mark Lemelin (Finland) Anssi Salonen; Linesmen: (Sweden) Jimmy Dahmen (Russia) Alexander Otmakhov

Qualification playoffs

20 February 2018; 16:40	Slovenia	1–2 OT (1–0, 0–0, 0–1) (OT: 0–1)	Norway	Gangneung Hockey Centre, Pyeongchang; Attendance: 6,312

Game reference

Gašper Krošelj
Goalies
Lars Haugen
Referees:
(Switzerland) Daniel Stricker
(Switzerland) Tobias Wehrli
Linesmen:
(Czech Republic) Vít Lederer
(Czech Republic) Miroslav Lhotský

Urbas (Muršak) (PP) – 06:38	1–0
	1–1	43:06 – Kristiansen (Røymark, Bastiansen)
	1–2	63:06 – Bonsaksen (Rosseli Olsen, P. Thoresen)

4 min
Penalties
12 min
34
Shots
26

Quarterfinal

21 February 2018; 16:40	Olympic Athletes from Russia	6–1 (3–0, 2–1, 1–0)	Norway	Gangneung Hockey Centre, Pyeongchang; Attendance: 3,553

Game reference

Vasily Koshechkin
Goalies
Lars Haugen
Henrik Haukeland
Referees:
(Czech Republic) Jan Hribik
(United States) Timothy Mayer
Linesmen:
(Germany) Lukas Kohlmüller
(United States) Judson Ritter

Grigorenko (Kablukov, Telegin) – 08:54	1–0
Gusev (Mozyakin, Datsyuk) (PP) – 13:25	2–0
Voynov (Gusev, Kaprizov) – 19:20	3–0
	3–1	27:21 – Bonsaksen (M. Olimb, K.A. Olimb)
Kalinin (Kovalchuk, Voinov) (PP) – 28:35	4–1
Nesterov (Gusev, Datsyuk) (PP) – 33:06	5–1
Telegin (Grigorenko, Kablukov) – 53:15	6–1

10 min
Penalties
10 min
32
Shots
14

== Nordic combined ==
Norway has qualified 5 athletes.

Athlete	Event	Ski jumping			Cross-country		Total	
Athlete	Event	Distance	Points	Rank	Time	Rank	Time	Rank
Espen Andersen	Normal hill/10 km	104.5	117.2	7	25:11.1	28	26:05.1	10
Espen Andersen	Large hill/10 km	121.0	105.6	25	24:23.8	31	26:36.8	22
Jørgen Graabak	Normal hill/10 km	90.0	93.6	23	24:53.3	20	27:21.3	18
Jørgen Graabak	Large hill/10 km	119.5	110.9	19	23:25.3	6	25:17.3	10
Jarl Magnus Riiber	Normal hill/10 km	111.0	126.9	2	24:58.9	23	25:13.9	4
Jarl Magnus Riiber	Large hill/10 km	139.0	138.6	2	23:54.3	17	23:55.3	4
Jan Schmid	Normal hill/10 km	88.0	88.8	31	24:47.8	18	27:34.8	25
Jan Schmid	Large hill/10 km	119.0	107.9	22	23:15.7	2	25:19.7	11
Espen Andersen; Jørgen Graabak; Jarl Magnus Riiber; Jan Schmid	Team large hill/4×5 km	527.5	449.2	4	46:35.5	2	47:02.5	2nd place, silver medalist(s)

== Skeleton ==
Norway qualified a single male athlete for the skeleton event. Former Olympic champion Maya Pederson had also competed for Norway in a bid to qualify for the 2018 Olympics but came up short. Male rider Alexander Henning Hannsen received a reallocation invitation.

Athlete	Event	Run 1		Run 2		Run 3		Run 4		Total	
Athlete	Event	Time	Rank	Time	Rank	Time	Rank	Time	Rank	Time	Rank
Alexander Henning Hanssen	Men's	51.44	17	51.51	22	51.37	19	51.57	18	3:25.89	20

== Ski jumping ==
Norway has qualified 2 women and 5 men.

Men

Athlete	Event	Qualification			First round			Final			Total	
Athlete	Event	Distance	Points	Rank	Distance	Points	Rank	Distance	Points	Rank	Points	Rank
Johann André Forfang	Normal hill	100.0	121.1	13 Q	106.0	125.9	2 Q	109.5	125	4	250.9	2nd place, silver medalist(s)
Johann André Forfang	Large hill	137.0	128.7	2 Q	133.0	132.1	9 Q	134.5	139.5	4	271.6	5
Robert Johansson	Normal hill	98.0	118.3	19 Q	100.5	119.9	10 Q	113.5	129.8	2	249.7	3rd place, bronze medalist(s)
Robert Johansson	Large hill	135.0	131.9	1 Q	137.5	138.3	4 Q	134.5	137.0	6	275.3	3rd place, bronze medalist(s)
Andreas Stjernen	Normal hill	100.0	119.3	15 Q	104.0	114.5	15 Q	103.5	111.3	15	225.8	15
Andreas Stjernen	Large hill	128.5	110.2	19 Q	134.5	134.7	6 Q	131.5	132.6	7	267.3	8
Daniel-André Tande	Normal hill	100.0	123.0	8 Q	103.5	118.7	13 Q	111.5	123.6	5	242.3	6
Daniel-André Tande	Large hill	131.5	126.5	6 Q	131.0	128.9	15 Q	138.5	144.2	1	273.1	4
Anders Fannemel*; Johann André Forfang; Robert Johansson; Andreas Stjernen; Daniel-André Tande	Team large hill	—N/a			539.0	545.9	1 Q	544.0	552.6	1	1098.5	1st place, gold medalist(s)

Anders Fannemel was the back-up jumper for Norway.

Women

Athlete	Event	First round			Final			Total	
Athlete	Event	Distance	Points	Rank	Distance	Points	Rank	Points	Rank
Maren Lundby	Normal hill	105.5	125.4	1 Q	110.0	139.2	1	264.6	1st place, gold medalist(s)
Silje Opseth	Normal hill	89.5	83.5	18 Q	91.5	94.7	11	178.2	16

== Snowboarding ==
Freestyle

Athlete	Event	Qualification				Final				
Athlete	Event	Run 1	Run 2	Best	Rank	Run 1	Run 2	Run 3	Best	Rank
Torgeir Bergrem	Men's big air	94.25	59.50	94.25	4 Q	88.50	42.50	JNS	131.00	7
Torgeir Bergrem	Men's slopestyle	45.80	75.45	75.45	5 Q	58.80	75.80	60.03	75.80	8
Marcus Kleveland	Men's big air	84.25	46.00	84.25	10	Did not advance				18
Marcus Kleveland	Men's slopestyle	83.71	32.30	83.71	1 Q	77.76	43.71	37.18	77.76	6
Mons Røisland	Men's slopestyle	76.50	43.68	76.50	4 Q	DNS				12
Ståle Sandbech	Men's big air	84.75	41.25	84.75	7	Did not advance				16
Ståle Sandbech	Men's slopestyle	74.11	82.13	82.13	4 Q	44.81	81.01	38.13	81.01	4
Silje Norendal	Women's big air	76.00	77.50	77.50	10 Q	70.50	61.00	JNS	70.50	6
Silje Norendal	Women's slopestyle	Canceled				73.91	47.66	CAN	73.91	4

Mons Røisland sustained injuries before the final and therefore withdrew from the slopestyle competition and the rest of the 2018 Winter Olympics.

== Speed skating ==
Men

Athlete	Event	Race	
Athlete	Event	Time	Rank
Håvard Bøkko	5000 m	6:24.50	18
Håvard Bøkko	10000 m	13:17.41	11
Sindre Henriksen	1500 m	1:45.64	7
Allan Johansson	1500 m	DNF	
Håvard Lorentzen	500 m	34.31	1st place, gold medalist(s)
Håvard Lorentzen	1000 m	1:07.99	2nd place, silver medalist(s)
Simen Spieler Nilsen	5000 m	6:18.39	13
Sverre Lunde Pedersen	1500 m	1:46.12	9
Sverre Lunde Pedersen	5000 m	6:11.618	3rd place, bronze medalist(s)
Henrik Rukke	500 m	35.500	28
Henrik Rukke	1000 m	1:07.99	32

Women

Athlete	Event	Race	
Athlete	Event	Time	Rank
Hege Bøkko	500 m	38.538	18
Hege Bøkko	1000 m	1:15.98	14
Ida Njåtun	500 m	39.33	27
Ida Njåtun	1000 m	1:15.43	10
Ida Njåtun	1500 m	1:56.46	7
Ida Njåtun	3000 m	4:06.67	12

Mass start

Athlete	Event	Semifinal			Final		
Athlete	Event	Points	Time	Rank	Points	Time	Rank
Sverre Lunde Pedersen	Men's mass start	2	7:58.65	9	Did not advance		

Team pursuit

Athlete	Event	Quarterfinal		Semifinal		Final	
Athlete	Event	Opposition Time	Rank	Opposition Time	Rank	Opposition Time	Rank
Håvard Bøkko; Sindre Henriksen; Simen Nilsen; Sverre Lunde Pedersen	Men's team pursuit	New Zealand; W 3:41.18	3 Q	Netherlands; W 3:37.08	1 FA	South Korea; W 3:37.32	1st place, gold medalist(s)

== Reactions ==
On or about 6 February 2018 before the games, chefs for the Norwegian Olympic team inadvertently ordered 15,000 eggs from a South Korean grocery store due to a Google Translate error. They intended to order 1,500 eggs. One chef said to the Norwegian newspaper Aftenposten, "There was literally no end to the delivery".
