= 2018 Winter Olympics medal table =

2018 Winter Olympics medals
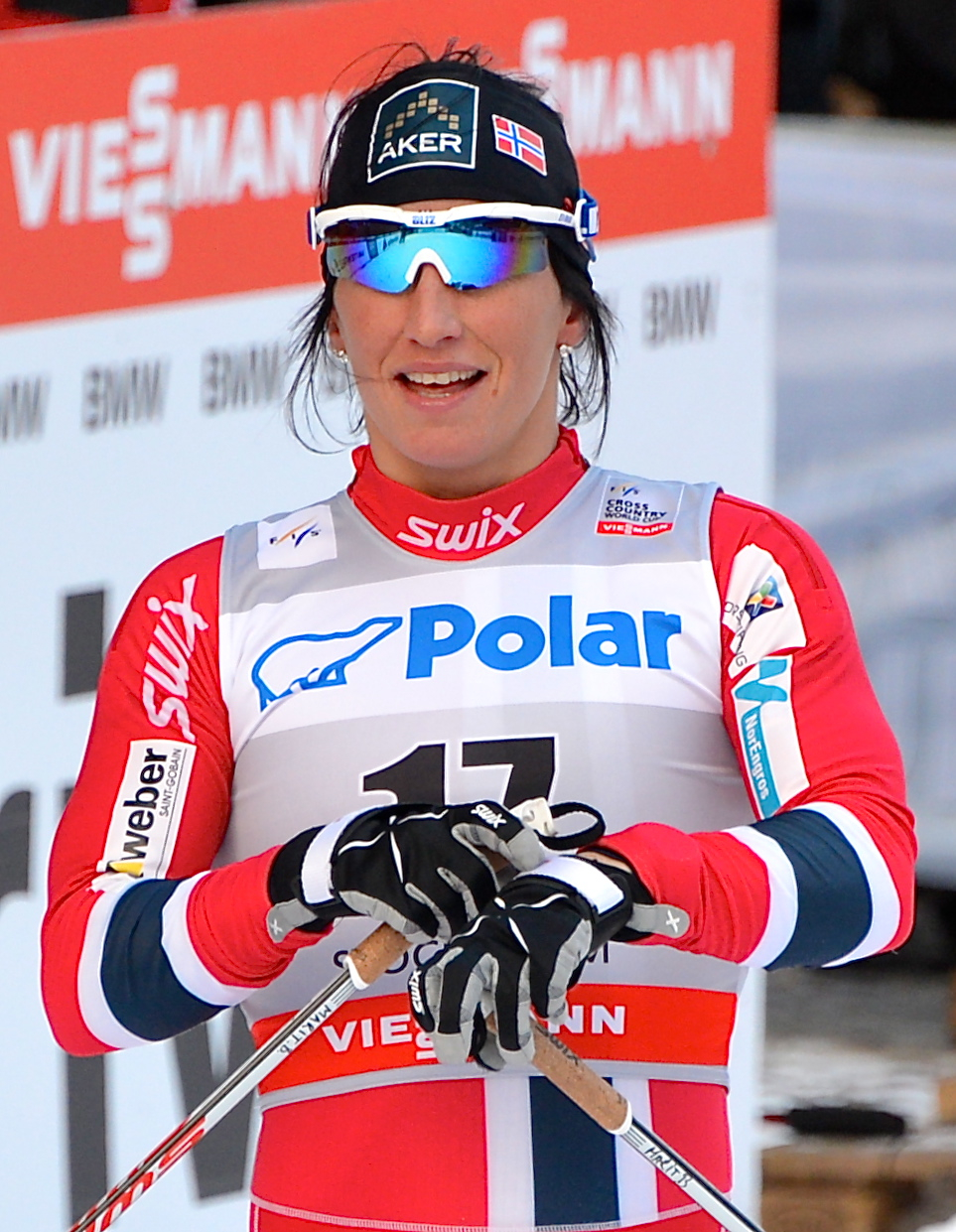
- Marit Bjørgen (pictured) won five medals at the 2018 Winter Olympics, the most of any competing athlete.
- Location: Pyeongchang, South Korea

Highlights
- Most gold medals: Germany (14) and Norway (14)
- Most total medals: Norway (39)
- Medalling NOCs: 30

World map showing the medal achievements of each country during the 2018 Winter Olympics Legend: represents countries that won at least one gold medal. represents countries that won at least one silver medal but no gold medals. represents countries that won at least one bronze medal but no gold or silver medals. represents countries that did not win any medals. represents entities that did not participate in the 2018 Winter Olympics.

The 2018 Winter Olympics, officially known as the XXIII Olympic Winter Games, were an international winter multi-sport event held in Pyeongchang County (stylized as PyeongChang for the games), South Korea, from 9 to 25 February, with preliminary events in some sports beginning on 8 February. A total of 2,833 athletes representing 92 National Olympic Committees (NOCs) participated. The games featured 102 medal events in 15 sports, making it the first Winter Olympics to surpass 100 medal events. Four new disciplines in existing sports were introduced to the Winter Olympic Games program in Pyeongchang: big air snowboarding, mixed doubles curling, mass start speed skating, and mixed team alpine skiing.

Athletes representing 30 NOCs received at least one medal, the highest for any Winter Olympic Games thus far, with 22 NOCs winning at least one gold medal. Athletes from Norway won the most medals overall, with 39, surpassing the previous record of 37 medals set by the United States at the 2010 Winter Olympics. Athletes from Germany and Norway tied for the most gold medals with 14 each, equaling the record set by Canada in 2010 for most gold medals won at a single Winter Olympics. Hungary won its first Winter Olympic gold medal ever, doing so in the men's 5,000 meter short-track speed skating relay.

Norwegian cross-country skier Marit Bjørgen won the most medals at the games with five (two gold, one silver, and two bronze). With 15 total Olympic medals, she also became the most decorated athlete in Winter Olympics history.

== Medal table ==
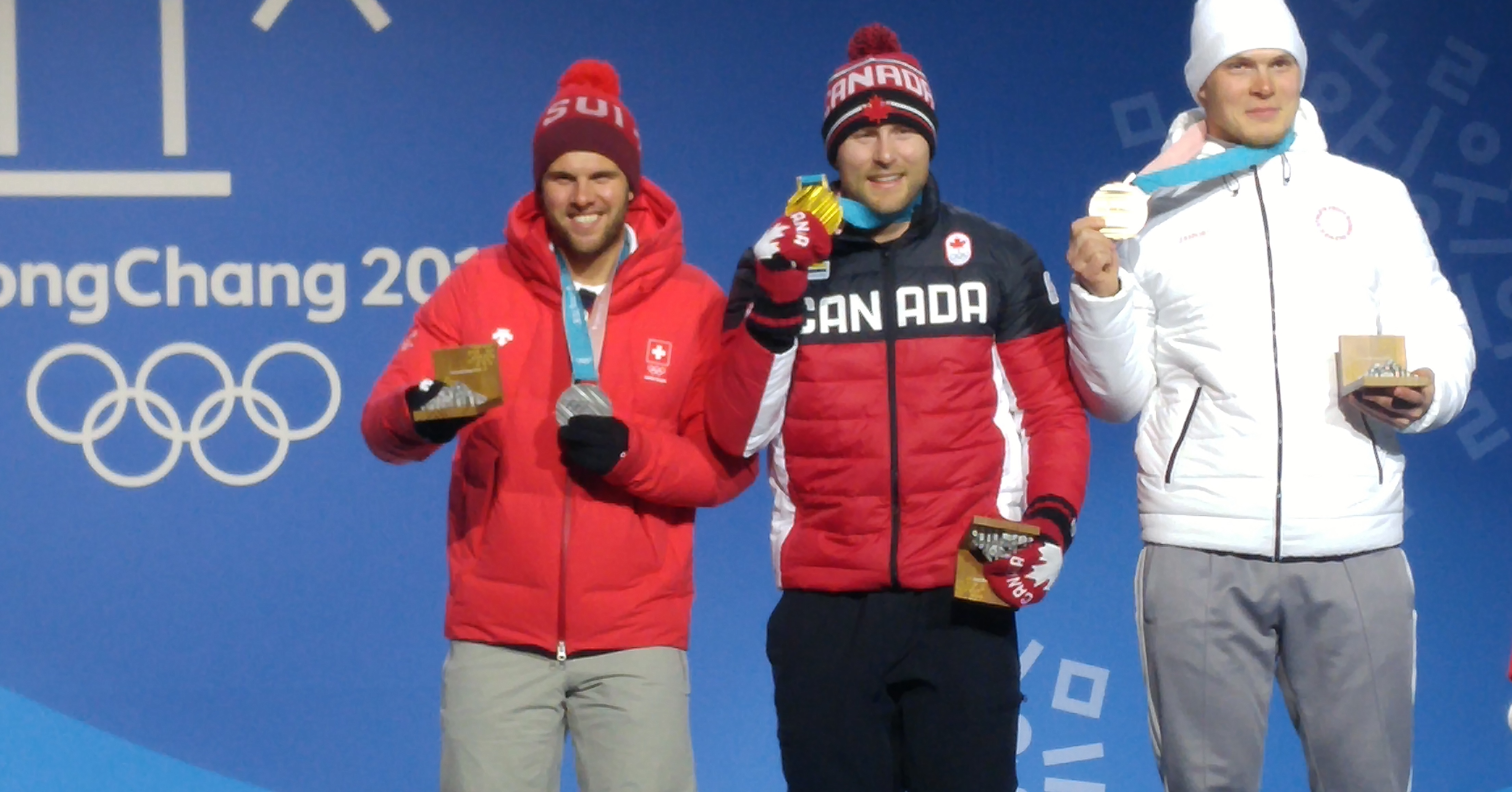
The podium for the men's ski cross event. From left to right: silver medalist Marc Bischofberger (Switzerland), gold medalist Brady Leman (Canada) and bronze medalist Sergey Ridzik (Olympic Athlete from Russia).

The medal table is based on information provided by the International Olympic Committee (IOC) and is consistent with IOC conventional sorting in its published medal tables. The table uses the Olympic medal table sorting method. By default, the table is ordered by the number of gold medals the athletes from a nation have won, where a nation is an entity represented by a NOC. The number of silver medals is taken into consideration next and then the number of bronze medals. If teams are still tied, equal ranking is given and they are listed alphabetically by their IOC country code.

At the 2018 Winter Olympics, athletes were tied in three events. In the women's 10 km cross-country skiing, two bronze medals were awarded due to a tie. In the two-man bobsleigh, two gold medals and no silver medal were awarded due to a tie, while in the four-man bobsleigh, two silver medals and no bronze medal were awarded due to a tie.

* Host nation (South Korea)

2018 Winter Olympics medal table (Note: Figures in table reflect all official changes in medal standings.)
Rank	NOC	Gold	Silver	Bronze	Total
1	Norway	14	14	11	39
2	Germany	14	10	7	31
3	Canada	11	8	10	29
4	United States	9	8	6	23
5	Netherlands	8	6	6	20
6	Sweden	7	6	1	14
7	South Korea*	5	8	4	17
8	Switzerland	5	6	4	15
9	France	5	4	6	15
10	Austria	5	3	6	14
11	Japan	4	5	4	13
12	Italy	3	2	5	10
13	Olympic Athletes from Russia (Note: Olympic Athletes from Russia was the IOC designation of select Russian athletes permitted to participate in the 2018 Winter Olympics. The designation was instigated following the suspension of the Russian Olympic Committee after the Russian doping scandal.)	2	6	9	17
14	Czech Republic	2	2	3	7
15	Belarus	2	1	0	3
16	China	1	6	2	9
17	Slovakia	1	2	0	3
18	Finland	1	1	4	6
19	Great Britain	1	0	4	5
20	Poland	1	0	1	2
21	Hungary	1	0	0	1
21	Ukraine	1	0	0	1
23	Australia	0	2	1	3
24	Slovenia	0	1	1	2
25	Belgium	0	1	0	1
26	New Zealand	0	0	2	2
26	Spain	0	0	2	2
28	Kazakhstan	0	0	1	1
28	Latvia	0	0	1	1
28	Liechtenstein	0	0	1	1
Totals (30 entries)		103	102	102	307

== Changes in medal standings ==
List of official changes in medal standings
Ruling date	Sport/event	Athlete (NOC)	1st place, gold medalist(s)	2nd place, silver medalist(s)	3rd place, bronze medalist(s)	Net change	Comment
22 February 2018	Curling, mixed doubles	Alexander Krushelnitskiy (OAR) DSQ; Anastasia Bryzgalova (OAR)			−1	−1	On 18 February 2018, it was reported that Russian curler Alexander Krushelnitskiy failed a doping test for meldonium. After testing of the B sample was also positive, the Court of Arbitration for Sport confirmed that they were instituting formal proceedings. On 22 February 2018, Krushelnitskiy and his partner Anastasia Bryzgalova were stripped of their bronze medals in the mixed doubles. The bronze medals were then awarded to the Norwegian mixed curling team, who had lost the bronze medal game to Krushelnitskiy and Bryzgalova.
22 February 2018	Curling, mixed doubles	Kristin Skaslien (NOR); Magnus Nedregotten (NOR)			+1	+1	

List of official changes by country
NOC	Gold	Silver	Bronze	Net change
Norway			+1	+1
Olympic Athletes from Russia			−1	−1

== See also ==
- List of 2018 Winter Olympics medal winners
- All-time Olympic Games medal table
- 2018 Winter Paralympics medal table
