= Curling at the 2018 Winter Olympics =

Curling at the XXIII Olympic Winter Games
- Curling pictogram at the 2018 Winter Olympics
- Venue: Gangneung Gymnasium
- Dates: 8–25 February 2018
- No. of events: 3 (1 men, 1 women, 1 mixed)
- Competitors: 116 from 13 nations

Men's curling at the XXIII Olympic Winter Games

Medalists
1st place, gold medalist(s)		United States
2nd place, silver medalist(s)		Sweden
3rd place, bronze medalist(s)		Switzerland

Women's curling at the XXIII Olympic Winter Games

Medalists
1st place, gold medalist(s)		Sweden
2nd place, silver medalist(s)		South Korea
3rd place, bronze medalist(s)		Japan

Mixed doubles's curling at the XXIII Olympic Winter Games

Medalists
1st place, gold medalist(s)		Canada
2nd place, silver medalist(s)		Switzerland
3rd place, bronze medalist(s)		Norway

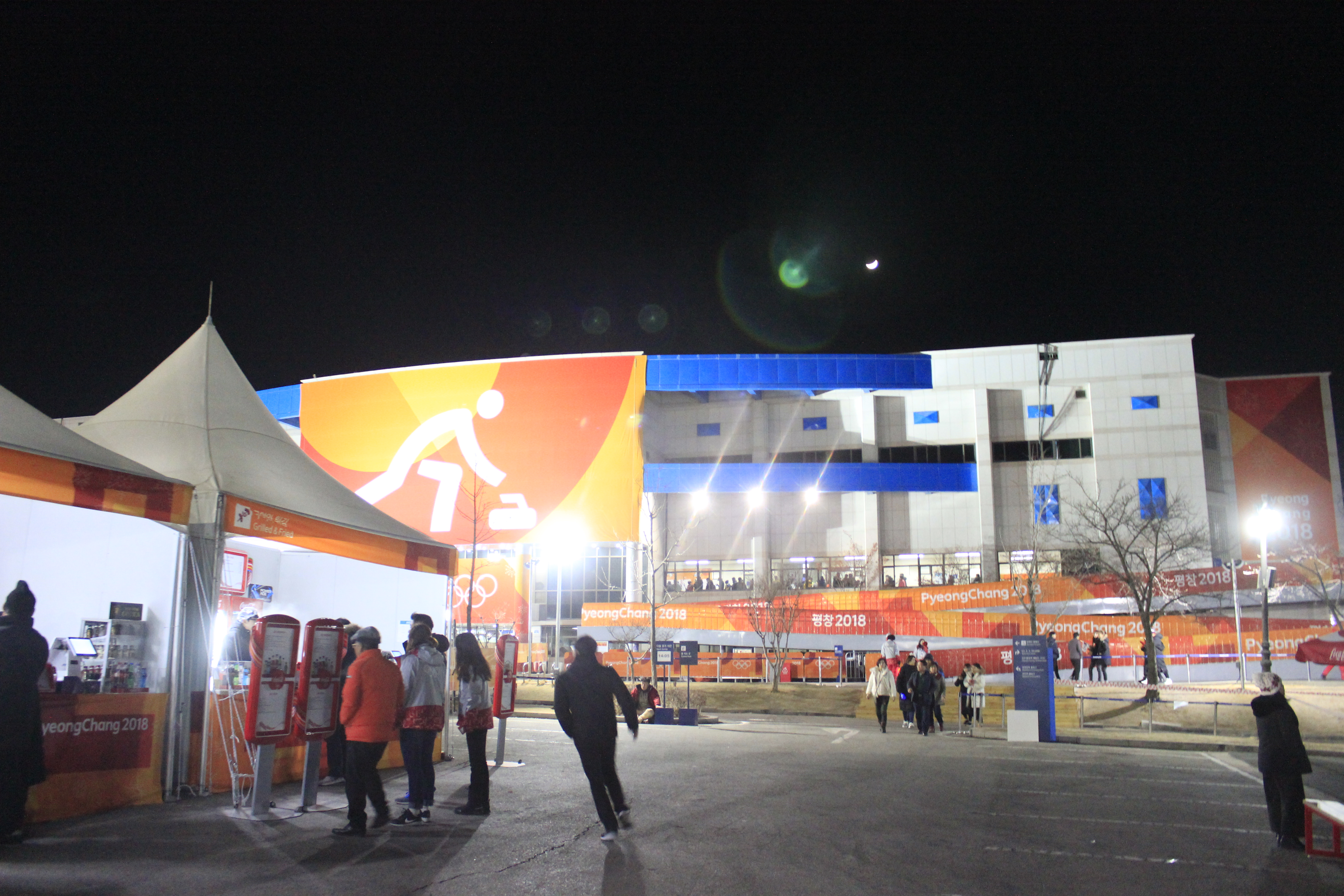
Gangneung Curling Centre during the 2018 Winter Olympics

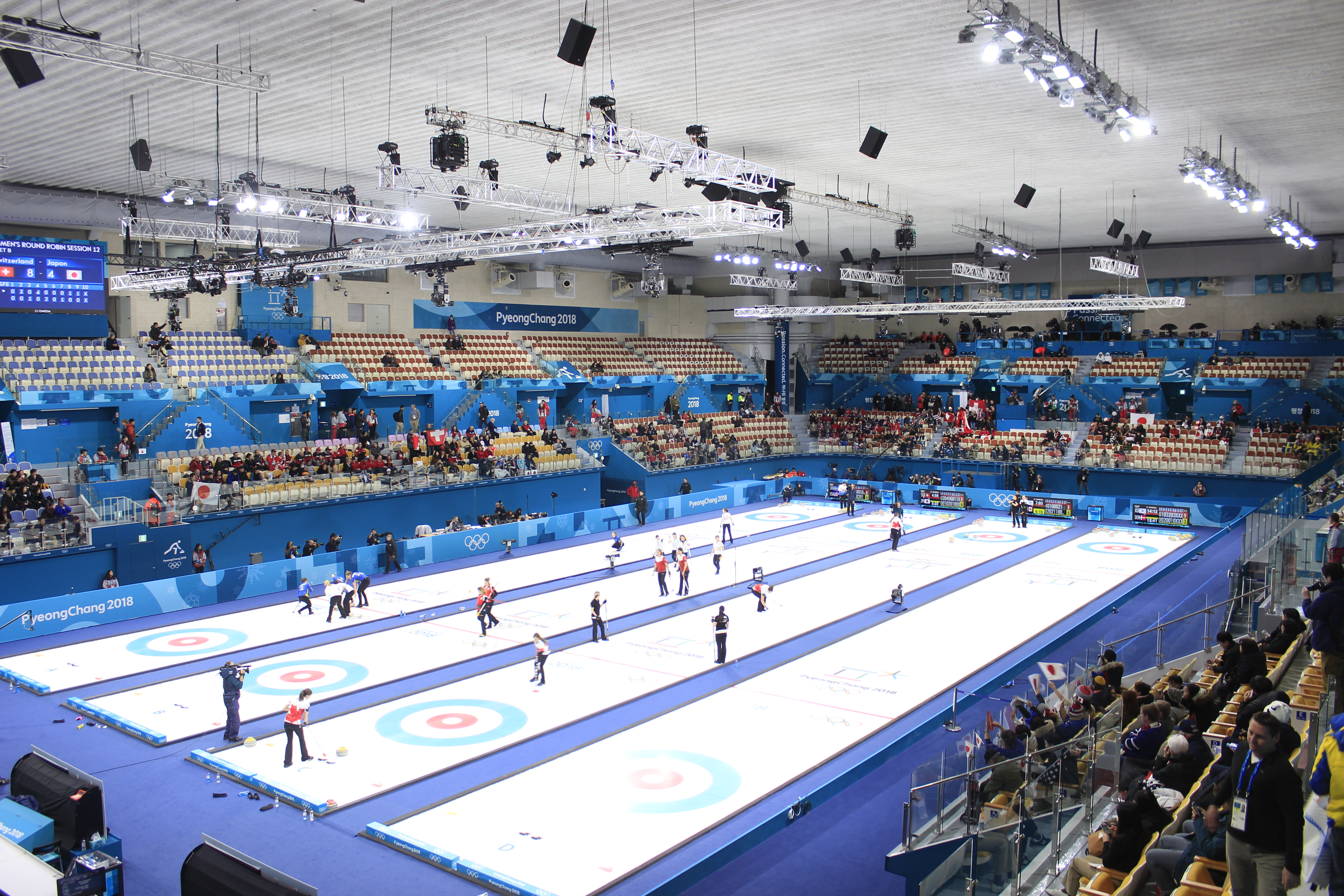
Inside view of Gangneung Curling Centre

The curling competition of the 2018 Winter Olympics was held between 8 and 25 February 2018 at the Gangneung Curling Centre. This was the seventh time that curling is on the Olympic program. In each of the men's and women's competitions, ten nations competed. A third competition was added for the 2018 Olympics, mixed doubles, in which teams consist of one woman and one man. There were eight participating countries in the doubles competition.

== Qualification ==
Qualification to the curling tournaments at the Winter Olympics was determined through two methods. Nations could qualify teams by earning qualification points from performances at the 2016 and 2017 World Curling Championships. Teams could also qualify through an Olympic qualification event which was held in December 2017. Seven nations qualified teams via World Championship qualification points, while two nations qualified through the qualification event. As host nation, South Korea qualified teams automatically, thus making a total of ten teams per gender in the curling tournaments. For the mixed doubles competition the top seven ranked teams earning qualification points from performances at the 2016 and 2017 World Mixed Doubles Curling Championship qualified along with hosts South Korea.

== Competition schedule ==
Curling competitions started the day before the Opening Ceremony and finish on the last day of the games, meaning the sport was the only one to have a competition every day of the games. The following was the competition schedule for the curling competitions:

RR	Round robin	SF	Semifinals	B	3rd place play-off	F	Final

Date Event	Thu 8	Fri 9	Sat 10	Sun 11	Mon 12	Tue 13		Wed 14	Thu 15	Fri 16	Sat 17	Sun 18	Mon 19	Tue 20	Wed 21	Thu 22	Fri 23	Sat 24	Sun 25
Men's tournament								RR	RR	RR	RR	RR	RR	RR	RR	SF	B	F	
Women's tournament								RR	RR	RR	RR	RR	RR	RR	RR		SF	B	F
Mixed doubles	RR	RR	RR	RR	SF	B	F												

== Medal summary ==
=== Medal table ===
Rank	Nation	Gold	Silver	Bronze	Total
1	Sweden	1	1	0	2
2	Canada	1	0	0	1
2	United States	1	0	0	1
4	Switzerland	0	1	1	2
5	South Korea*	0	1	0	1
6	Japan	0	0	1	1
6	Norway	0	0	1	1
Totals (7 entries)		3	3	3	9

=== Medal events ===
Event	Gold	Silver	Bronze
Men	United States; John Shuster; Tyler George; Matt Hamilton; John Landsteiner; Joe Polo	Sweden; Niklas Edin; Oskar Eriksson; Rasmus Wranå; Christoffer Sundgren; Henrik Leek	Switzerland; Benoît Schwarz; Claudio Pätz; Peter de Cruz; Valentin Tanner; Dominik Märki
Women	Sweden; Anna Hasselborg; Sara McManus; Agnes Knochenhauer; Sofia Mabergs; Jennie Wåhlin	South Korea; Kim Eun-jung; Kim Kyeong-ae; Kim Seon-yeong; Kim Yeong-mi; Kim Cho-hi	Japan; Satsuki Fujisawa; Chinami Yoshida; Yumi Suzuki; Yurika Yoshida; Mari Motohashi
Mixed doubles	Canada; Kaitlyn Lawes; John Morris	Switzerland; Jenny Perret; Martin Rios	Norway^{1} Kristin Skaslien; Magnus Nedregotten

Notes

1. The Olympic Athletes from Russia team originally won the mixed doubles bronze medal, but were disqualified after Alexander Krushelnitskiy tested positive for meldonium.

== Results summary ==
=== Men's tournament ===
==== Round robin ====
Standings

Final round robin standings
Team	Skip	Pld	W	L	PF	PA	EW	EL	BE	SE	S%	Qualification
Sweden	Niklas Edin	9	7	2	62	43	34	28	13	8	87%	Playoffs
Canada	Kevin Koe	9	6	3	56	46	36	34	14	8	87%	Playoffs
United States	John Shuster	9	5	4	67	63	37	39	4	6	80%	Playoffs
Great Britain	Kyle Smith	9	5	4	55	60	40	37	8	7	82%	Tiebreaker
Switzerland	Peter de Cruz	9	5	4	60	55	39	37	10	6	83%	Tiebreaker
Norway	Thomas Ulsrud	9	4	5	52	56	34	39	7	8	82%	
South Korea	Kim Chang-min	9	4	5	65	63	39	39	8	8	82%	
Japan	Yusuke Morozumi	9	4	5	48	56	33	35	13	5	81%	
Italy	Joël Retornaz	9	3	6	50	56	37	38	15	7	81%	
Denmark	Rasmus Stjerne	9	2	7	53	70	36	39	12	5	83%	

Results

Team	Canada	Denmark	Great Britain	Italy	Japan	Norway	South Korea	Sweden	Switzerland	United States	Record
Canada		8–3	6–4	5–3	8–4	7–4	7–6	2–5	6–8	7–9	6–3
Denmark	3–8		6–7	6–4	4–6	8–10	9–8	5–9	7–9	5–9	2–7
Great Britain	4–6	7–6		7–6	6–5	10–3	5–11	6–8	6–5	4–10	5–4
Italy	3–5	4–6	6–7		5–6	6–4	6–8	3–7	7–4	10–9	3–6
Japan	4–8	6–4	5–6	6–5		6–4	4-10	4–11	5–6	8–2	4–5
Norway	4–7	10–8	3–10	4–6	4–6		7–5	7–2	5–7	8–5	4–5
South Korea	6–7	8–9	11–5	8–6	10-4	5–7		2–7	8–7	7–11	4–5
Sweden	5–2	9–5	8–6	7–3	11–4	2–7	7–2		3–10	10–4	7–2
Switzerland	8–6	9–7	5–6	4–7	6–5	7–5	7–8	10–3		4–8	5–4
United States	9–7	9–5	10–4	9–10	2–8	5–8	11–7	4–10	8–4		5–4

==== Playoffs ====
Semifinals
1	Sweden	9
4	Switzerland	3
2	Canada	3
3	United States	5

Gold medal game
1	Sweden	7
3	United States	10
Bronze medal game
2	Canada	5
4	Switzerland	7

=== Women's tournament ===
==== Round robin ====
Standings

Final round robin standings
Team	Skip	Pld	W	L	PF	PA	EW	EL	BE	SE	S%	Qualification
South Korea	Kim Eun-jung	9	8	1	75	44	41	34	5	15	79%	Playoffs
Sweden	Anna Hasselborg	9	7	2	64	48	42	34	14	13	83%	Playoffs
Great Britain	Eve Muirhead	9	6	3	61	56	39	38	12	6	79%	Playoffs
Japan	Satsuki Fujisawa	9	5	4	59	55	38	36	10	13	75%	Playoffs
China	Wang Bingyu	9	4	5	57	65	35	38	12	5	78%	
Canada	Rachel Homan	9	4	5	68	59	40	36	10	12	81%	
Switzerland	Silvana Tirinzoni	9	4	5	60	55	34	37	12	7	78%	
United States	Nina Roth	9	4	5	56	65	38	39	7	6	78%	
Olympic Athletes from Russia	Victoria Moiseeva	9	2	7	45	76	34	40	8	6	76%	
Denmark	Madeleine Dupont	9	1	8	50	72	32	41	10	6	73%	

Results

Team	Canada	China	Denmark	Great Britain	Japan	Olympic Athlete From Russia	South Korea	Sweden	Switzerland	United States	Record
Canada		5–7	8–9	5–6	8–3	9–8	6–8	6–7	10–8	11–3	4–5
China	7–5		10–7	7–8	7–6	6–7	5–12	4–8	7–2	4–10	4–5
Denmark	9–8	7–10		6–7	5–8	7–8	3–9	3–9	4–6	6–7	1–8
Great Britain	6–5	8–7	7–6		8–6	10–3	4–7	6–8	8–7	4–7	6–3
Japan	3–8	6–7	8–5	6–8		10–5	7–5	5–4	4–8	10–5	5–4
Olympic Athletes from Russia	8–9	7–6	8–7	3–10	5–10		2–11	4–5	2–11	6–7	2–7
South Korea	8–6	12–5	9–3	7–4	5–7	11–2		7–6	7–5	9–6	8–1
Sweden	7–6	8–4	9–3	8–6	4–5	5–4	6–7		8–7	9–6	7–2
Switzerland	8–10	2–7	6–4	7–8	8–4	11–2	5–7	7–8		6–5	4–5
United States	3–11	10–4	7–6	7–4	5–10	7–6	6–9	6–9	5–6		4–5

==== Playoffs ====
Semifinals
1	South Korea	8
4	Japan	7
2	Sweden	10
3	Great Britain	5

Gold medal game
1	South Korea	3
2	Sweden	8
Bronze medal game
3	Great Britain	3
4	Japan	5

=== Mixed doubles ===
==== Round robin ====
Standings

Final round robin standings
Team	Athletes	Pld	W	L	PF	PA	EW	EL	BE	SE	S%	Qualification
Canada	Kaitlyn Lawes / John Morris	7	6	1	52	26	28	20	0	9	80%	Playoffs
Switzerland	Jenny Perret / Martin Rios	7	5	2	45	40	29	26	0	10	71%	Playoffs
Olympic Athletes from Russia	Anastasia Bryzgalova / Alexander Krushelnitskiy	7	4	3	36	44	26	27	1	7	67%	Playoffs
Norway	Kristin Skaslien / Magnus Nedregotten	7	4	3	39	43	26	25	1	8	74%	Tiebreaker
China	Wang Rui / Ba Dexin	7	4	3	47	42	27	27	1	6	72%	Tiebreaker
South Korea	Jang Hye-ji / Lee Ki-jeong	7	2	5	40	40	23	29	1	7	67%	
United States	Rebecca Hamilton / Matt Hamilton	7	2	5	37	43	26	25	0	9	74%	
Finland	Oona Kauste / Tomi Rantamäki	7	1	6	35	53	23	29	0	6	67%	

Results

Team	Canada	China	Finland	Norway	Olympic Athlete From Russia	South Korea	Switzerland	United States of America	Record
Canada		10–4	8–2	6–9	8–2	7–3	7–2	6–4	6–1
China	4–10		10–5	9–3	5–6	8–7	5–7	6–4	4–3
Finland	2–8	5–10		6–7	5–7	4–9	6–7	7–5	1–6
Norway	9–6	3–9	7–6		3–4	8–3	6–5	3–10	4–3
Olympic Athletes from Russia	2–8	6–5	7–5	4–3		6–5	8–9	3–9	4–3
South Korea	3–7	7–8	9–4	3–8	5–6		4–6	9–1	2–5
Switzerland	2–7	7–5	7–6	5–6	9–8	6–4		9–4	5–2
United States	4–6	4–6	5–7	10–3	9–3	1–9	4–9		2–5

==== Playoffs ====
Semifinals
1	Canada	8
4	Norway	4
2	Switzerland	7
3	Olympic Athletes from Russia	5

Gold medal game
1	Canada	10
2	Switzerland	3
Bronze medal game
3	Olympic Athletes from Russia (DSQ)	L
4	Norway	W

== Participating nations ==
A total of 113 athletes from 13 nations (including the IOC's designation of Olympic Athletes from Russia) were scheduled to participate (the numbers of athletes are shown in parentheses). Some curlers competed in both the 4-person and mixed doubles tournament, therefore the numbers included on this list are the total athletes sent by each NOC to the Olympics, not how many athletes they qualified.

- Canada (12)
- China (7)
- Denmark (10)
- Finland (2)
- Great Britain (10)
- Italy (5)
- Japan (10)
- Norway (7)
- Olympic Athletes from Russia (7)
- South Korea (12)
- Sweden (10)
- Switzerland (11)
- United States (10)
