= Curling at the 2018 Winter Olympics – Mixed doubles tournament =

Mixed doubles curling at the XXIII Olympic Winter Games
- Venue: Gangneung Curling Centre, Gangneung, South Korea
- Dates: 8–13 February
- Competitors: 16 from 8 nations

Medalists
1st place, gold medalist(s)		Kaitlyn Lawes; John Morris	Canada
2nd place, silver medalist(s)		Jenny Perret; Martin Rios	Switzerland
3rd place, bronze medalist(s)		Kristin Skaslien; Magnus Nedregotten	Norway

The mixed doubles curling tournament of the 2018 Winter Olympics was held at the Gangneung Curling Centre from 8 to 13 February 2018. Eight nations competed in a round robin preliminary round, and the top four nations at the conclusion of the round robin qualified for the medal round. This was the first time mixed doubles was held at the Winter Olympics.

On 18 February 2018, it was reported that bronze medallist Alexander Krushelnitskiy of the Olympic Athletes from Russia team had failed a drug test and was awaiting a test of the B sample. After the testing of the B sample that was also positive, the Court of Arbitration for Sport (CAS) confirmed that they were instituting formal proceedings; three days later, CAS disqualified the Olympic Athletes from Russia team and stripped them of the bronze medal, which was reawarded to the Norwegian team.

== Teams ==
Teams have one male and one female thrower, with one curler throwing rocks #1 and #5 and the other throwing rocks #2, #3 and #4. Only the Olympic Athletes from Russia team have the female curler throwing the middle three rocks and the male curler throwing first and last. The remainder of the teams have the male curler throwing the middle three rocks and the female curler throwing first and last. Teams can change at any time.

Canada	China	Finland	Norway
Female: Kaitlyn Lawes; Male: John Morris	Female: Wang Rui; Male: Ba Dexin	Female: Oona Kauste; Male: Tomi Rantamäki	Female: Kristin Skaslien; Male: Magnus Nedregotten
Olympic Athletes from Russia	South Korea	Switzerland	United States
Female: Anastasia Bryzgalova; Male: Alexander Krushelnitskiy	Female: Jang Hye-ji; Male: Lee Ki-jeong	Female: Jenny Perret; Male: Martin Rios	Female: Rebecca Hamilton; Male: Matt Hamilton

== Round-robin standings ==
Final round robin standings
Team	Athletes	Pld	W	L	PF	PA	EW	EL	BE	SE	S%	Qualification
Canada	Kaitlyn Lawes / John Morris	7	6	1	52	26	28	20	0	9	80%	Playoffs
Switzerland	Jenny Perret / Martin Rios	7	5	2	45	40	29	26	0	10	71%	Playoffs
Olympic Athletes from Russia	Anastasia Bryzgalova / Alexander Krushelnitskiy	7	4	3	36	44	26	27	1	7	67%	Playoffs
Norway	Kristin Skaslien / Magnus Nedregotten	7	4	3	39	43	26	25	1	8	74%	Tiebreaker
China	Wang Rui / Ba Dexin	7	4	3	47	42	27	27	1	6	72%	Tiebreaker
South Korea	Jang Hye-ji / Lee Ki-jeong	7	2	5	40	40	23	29	1	7	67%	
United States	Rebecca Hamilton / Matt Hamilton	7	2	5	37	43	26	25	0	9	74%	
Finland	Oona Kauste / Tomi Rantamäki	7	1	6	35	53	23	29	0	6	67%	

== Round-robin results ==
All draw times are listed in KST (UTC+9).

=== Summary ===
Team	Canada	China	Finland	Norway	Olympic Athlete From Russia	South Korea	Switzerland	United States of America	Record
Canada		10–4	8–2	6–9	8–2	7–3	7–2	6–4	6–1
China	4–10		10–5	9–3	5–6	8–7	5–7	6–4	4–3
Finland	2–8	5–10		6–7	5–7	4–9	6–7	7–5	1–6
Norway	9–6	3–9	7–6		3–4	8–3	6–5	3–10	4–3
Olympic Athletes from Russia	2–8	6–5	7–5	4–3		6–5	8–9	3–9	4–3
South Korea	3–7	7–8	9–4	3–8	5–6		4–6	9–1	2–5
Switzerland	2–7	7–5	7–6	5–6	9–8	6–4		9–4	5–2
United States	4–6	4–6	5–7	10–3	9–3	1–9	4–9		2–5

=== Draw 1 ===
Thursday, 8 February, 9:05

Sheet A	1	2	3	4	5	6	7	8	Final
United States (R. Hamilton / M. Hamilton)	3	0	1	1	2	0	2	X	9
Olympic Athletes from Russia (Bryzgalova / Krushelnitskiy)	0	2	0	0	0	1	0	X	3

Sheet B	1	2	3	4	5	6	7	8	Final
Canada (Lawes / Morris)	1	0	3	0	2	0	0	0	6
Norway (Skaslien / Nedregotten)	0	3	0	1	0	2	1	2	9

Sheet C	1	2	3	4	5	6	7	8	Final
South Korea (Jang / Lee)	3	1	1	0	0	0	4	X	9
Finland (Kauste / Rantamäki)	0	0	0	1	2	1	0	X	4

Sheet D	1	2	3	4	5	6	7	8	9	Final
China (Wang / Ba)	1	0	0	2	0	1	0	1	0	5
Switzerland (Perret / Rios)	0	1	1	0	1	0	2	0	2	7

=== Draw 2 ===
Thursday, 8 February, 20:05

Sheet A	1	2	3	4	5	6	7	8	Final
Finland (Kauste / Rantamäki)	0	0	2	0	0	2	2	0	6
Switzerland (Perret / Rios)	2	1	0	2	1	0	0	1	7

Sheet B	1	2	3	4	5	6	7	8	9	Final
South Korea (Jang / Lee)	0	1	0	0	4	0	2	0	0	7
China (Wang / Ba)	2	0	3	1	0	1	0	0	1	8

Sheet C	1	2	3	4	5	6	7	8	Final
Olympic Athletes from Russia (Bryzgalova / Krushelnitskiy)	0	1	0	1	1	0	0	1	4
Norway (Skaslien / Nedregotten)	0	0	1	0	0	1	1	0	3

Sheet D	1	2	3	4	5	6	7	8	Final
United States (R. Hamilton / M. Hamilton)	1	0	1	0	0	1	1	0	4
Canada (Lawes / Morris)	0	1	0	1	3	0	0	1	6

=== Draw 3 ===
Friday, 9 February, 8:35

Sheet A	1	2	3	4	5	6	7	8	Final
South Korea (Jang / Lee)	0	0	0	1	0	2	0	X	3
Norway (Skaslien / Nedregotten)	1	3	1	0	1	0	2	X	8

Sheet B	1	2	3	4	5	6	7	8	Final
United States (R. Hamilton / M. Hamilton)	1	1	0	1	0	0	1	0	4
Switzerland (Perret / Rios)	0	0	1	0	1	1	0	6	9

Sheet C	1	2	3	4	5	6	7	8	Final
China (Wang / Ba)	0	2	0	1	0	1	0	X	4
Canada (Lawes / Morris)	3	0	4	0	1	0	2	X	10

Sheet D	1	2	3	4	5	6	7	8	Final
Olympic Athletes from Russia (Bryzgalova / Krushelnitskiy)	0	0	4	0	1	2	0	X	7
Finland (Kauste / Rantamäki)	2	1	0	1	0	0	1	X	5

=== Draw 4 ===
Friday, 9 February, 13:35

Sheet A	1	2	3	4	5	6	7	8	Final
Canada (Lawes / Morris)	1	0	1	1	0	5	X	X	8
Finland (Kauste / Rantamäki)	0	1	0	0	1	0	X	X	2

Sheet B	1	2	3	4	5	6	7	8	9	Final
China (Wang / Ba)	0	0	0	3	0	0	1	1	0	5
Olympic Athletes from Russia (Bryzgalova / Krushelnitskiy)	1	1	1	0	1	1	0	0	1	6

Sheet C	1	2	3	4	5	6	7	8	Final
United States (R. Hamilton / M. Hamilton)	0	1	0	0	0	0	X	X	1
South Korea (Jang / Lee)	2	0	2	3	1	1	X	X	9

Sheet D	1	2	3	4	5	6	7	8	Final
Switzerland (Perret / Rios)	1	0	0	2	1	0	1	0	5
Norway (Skaslien / Nedregotten)	0	3	1	0	0	1	0	1	6

=== Draw 5 ===
Saturday, 10 February, 9:05

Sheet A	1	2	3	4	5	6	7	8	Final
China (Wang / Ba)	0	1	0	1	1	1	0	2	6
United States (R. Hamilton / M. Hamilton)	2	0	1	0	0	0	1	0	4

Sheet B	1	2	3	4	5	6	7	8	9	Final
Norway (Skaslien / Nedregotten)	1	0	1	0	3	0	1	0	1	7
Finland (Kauste / Rantamäki)	0	2	0	1	0	2	0	1	0	6

Sheet C	1	2	3	4	5	6	7	8	Final
Canada (Lawes / Morris)	0	4	0	1	1	1	X	X	7
Switzerland (Perret / Rios)	1	0	1	0	0	0	X	X	2

Sheet D	1	2	3	4	5	6	7	8	9	Final
South Korea (Jang / Lee)	1	0	1	0	0	1	0	2	0	5
Olympic Athletes from Russia (Bryzgalova / Krushelnitskiy)	0	1	0	2	1	0	1	0	1	6

=== Draw 6 ===
Saturday, 10 February, 20:05

Sheet A	1	2	3	4	5	6	7	8	Final
Olympic Athletes from Russia (Bryzgalova / Krushelnitskiy)	0	0	1	0	1	0	X	X	2
Canada (Lawes / Morris)	3	1	0	2	0	2	X	X	8

Sheet B	1	2	3	4	5	6	7	8	Final
Switzerland (Perret / Rios)	2	1	0	1	1	0	1	0	6
South Korea (Jang / Lee)	0	0	1	0	0	1	0	2	4

Sheet C	1	2	3	4	5	6	7	8	Final
Norway (Skaslien / Nedregotten)	0	3	0	0	0	0	X	X	3
United States (R. Hamilton / M. Hamilton)	1	0	1	4	1	3	X	X	10

Sheet D	1	2	3	4	5	6	7	8	Final
Finland (Kauste / Rantamäki)	0	3	0	1	0	1	0	X	5
China (Wang / Ba)	3	0	1	0	4	0	2	X	10

=== Draw 7 ===
Sunday, 11 February, 9:05

Sheet A	1	2	3	4	5	6	7	8	Final
Norway (Skaslien / Nedregotten)	0	1	1	0	1	0	X	X	3
China (Wang / Ba)	1	0	0	3	0	5	X	X	9

Sheet B	1	2	3	4	5	6	7	8	Final
Finland (Kauste / Rantamäki)	1	0	0	1	1	0	4	0	7
United States (R. Hamilton / M. Hamilton)	0	1	1	0	0	1	0	2	5

Sheet C	1	2	3	4	5	6	7	8	Final
Switzerland (Perret / Rios)	0	2	0	0	2	2	0	3	9
Olympic Athletes from Russia (Bryzgalova / Krushelnitskiy)	2	0	4	1	0	0	1	0	8

Sheet D	1	2	3	4	5	6	7	8	Final
Canada (Lawes / Morris)	1	1	0	2	1	0	2	X	7
South Korea (Jang / Lee)	0	0	2	0	0	1	0	X	3

== Tiebreaker ==
Sunday, 11 February, 20:05

Team	1	2	3	4	5	6	7	8	Final
China (Wang / Ba)	2	0	1	0	2	0	2	0	7
Norway (Skaslien / Nedregotten)	0	3	0	1	0	4	0	1	9

Player percentages
China		Norway	
Wang Rui	64%	Kristin Skaslien	77%
Ba Dexin	68%	Magnus Nedregotten	88%
Total	67%	Total	83%

== Playoffs ==
Semifinals
1	Canada	8
4	Norway	4
2	Switzerland	7
3	Olympic Athletes from Russia	5

Gold medal game
1	Canada	10
2	Switzerland	3
Bronze medal game
3	Olympic Athletes from Russia (DSQ^{1})	L
4	Norway	W

Notes

^{1} Olympic Athletes from Russia won the bronze medal match 8–4, but were disqualified due to the doping case mentioned above.

=== Semifinals ===
Monday, 12 February, 9:05

Sheet A	1	2	3	4	5	6	7	8	Final
Canada (Lawes / Morris)	2	0	0	1	2	0	3	X	8
Norway (Skaslien / Nedregotten)	0	1	1	0	0	2	0	X	4

Player percentages
Canada		Norway	
Kaitlyn Lawes	58%	Kristin Skaslien	77%
John Morris	82%	Magnus Nedregotten	66%
Total	73%	Total	70%

Monday, 12 February, 20:05

Sheet C	1	2	3	4	5	6	7	8	Final
Olympic Athletes from Russia (Bryzgalova / Krushelnitskiy)	0	2	0	0	2	1	0	0	5
Switzerland (Perret / Rios)	2	0	1	1	0	0	2	1	7

Player percentages
Olympic Athletes from Russia		Switzerland	
Anastasia Bryzgalova	70%	Jenny Perret	77%
Alexander Krushelnitskiy	86%	Martin Rios	78%
Total	76%	Total	78%

=== Bronze medal draw ===
Tuesday, 13 February, 9:05

Sheet B	1	2	3	4	5	6	7	8	Final
Olympic Athletes from Russia (Bryzgalova / Krushelnitskiy)	2	1	0	2	0	1	1	1	DSQ
Norway (Skaslien / Nedregotten)	0	0	2	0	2	0	0	0	W

Notes

- Olympic Athletes from Russia (which won the bronze medal match 8–4) were disqualified after the tournament due to the doping case.

Player percentages
Norway		Olympic Athletes from Russia	
Kristin Skaslien	64%	Anastasia Bryzgalova	83%
Magnus Nedregotten	65%	Alexander Krushelnitskiy	79%
Total	65%	Total	81%

=== Gold medal draw ===
Tuesday, 13 February, 20:05

Sheet B	1	2	3	4	5	6	7	8	Final
Canada (Lawes / Morris)	2	0	4	0	2	2	X	X	10
Switzerland (Perret / Rios)	0	2	0	1	0	0	X	X	3

Player percentages Each shot is marked out of 4
Player	1					2					3					4					5					6					%
Canada																															79.3%
Kaitlyn Lawes	2				X	4				2	4				4	4				4	4				0	0				4	72.7%
John Morris		4	4	3			4	2	4			2	4	3			4	1	4			4	3	4			2	4	4		83.3%
Switzerland																															66.7%
Jenny Perret	3				4	4				3	3				4	3				4	4				0	4				0	75%
Martin Rios		3	2	0			4	4	4			0	1	0			2	2	2			4	2	4			4	4	2		61.1%

== Final standings ==
The final standings are:

Place	Team
1st place, gold medalist(s)	Canada
2nd place, silver medalist(s)	Switzerland
3rd place, bronze medalist(s)	Norway
4	China
5	South Korea
6	United States
7	Finland
DSQ	Olympic Athletes from Russia

== Statistics ==
=== Player percentages ===
Player percentages during round robin play are as follows:

==== Female ====
#	Curler	1	2	3	4	5	6	7	Total
1	Kaitlyn Lawes (CAN)	72	70	77	75	77	86	78	76
2	Becca Hamilton (USA)	85	81	69	65	72	54	75	72
2	Wang Rui (CHN)	63	79	59	71	83	70	77	72
4	Anastasia Bryzgalova (OAR)	61	80	72	73	65	60	75	70
4	Kristin Skaslien (NOR)	61	84	63	70	83	56	65	70
6	Jenny Perret (SUI)	76	60	67	81	36	78	66	68
7	Jang Hye-ji (KOR)	71	71	62	63	69	50	52	63
8	Oona Kauste (FIN)	57	52	67	31	75	65	67	60

==== Male ====
#	Curler	1	2	3	4	5	6	7	Total
1	John Morris (CAN)	80	92	73	85	78	90	80	82
2	Magnus Nedregotten (NOR)	79	88	80	89	68	72	64	78
3	Matt Hamilton (USA)	81	80	88	43	80	76	75	76
4	Martin Rios (SUI)	81	73	66	85	71	74	69	74
5	Ba Dexin (CHN)	81	69	68	69	69	73	78	72
6	Tomi Rantamäki (FIN)	64	74	67	71	70	73	75	71
7	Lee Ki-jeong (KOR)	84	78	82	58	67	67	54	70
8	Alexander Krushelnitskiy (OAR)	55	58	63	73	65	63	65	64

==== Team total ====
#	Curler	1	2	3	4	5	6	7	Total
1	Canada	77	83	74	81	78	89	79	80
2	Norway	72	86	74	81	74	66	64	74
2	United States	82	81	80	52	77	68	75	74
4	China	74	73	64	70	74	71	78	72
5	Switzerland	81	71	76	68	55	76	68	71
6	Finland	61	65	67	55	72	72	72	67
6	South Korea	77	72	64	76	71	60	53	67
6	Olympic Athletes from Russia	59	72	68	73	65	61	70	67
