= Ba Dexin =

Chinese curler

Ba Dexin 巴德鑫
- Curler
- Born: June 14, 1990 (age 36); Harbin, China

Team
- Curling club: Harbin CC, Harbin, Heilongjiang

Curling career
- Member Association: China
- World Championship: 8 (2010, 2011, 2012, 2013, 2014, 2015, 2017, 2019)
- World Mixed Doubles Championship: 2 (2016, 2017)
- Pacific-Asia Championship: 6 (2010, 2011, 2012, 2013, 2014, 2015)
- Olympic: 2 (2014, 2018)
Medal record
Curling
Representing China
World Mixed Doubles Curling Championship
Silver medal – second place	2016 Karlstad
Bronze medal – third place	2017 Lethbridge
Pacific-Asia Championships
Gold medal – first place	2014 Karuizawa
Gold medal – first place	2013 Shanghai
Gold medal – first place	2012 Naseby
Gold medal – first place	2011 Nanjing
Gold medal – first place	2010 Uiseong
Bronze medal – third place	2015 Almaty
Asian Winter Games
Gold medal – first place	2017 Sapporo

Ba Dexin (Chinese: 巴德鑫; pinyin: Bā Déxīn; Mandarin pronunciation: [pá tɤ̌ ɕín]; born 14 June 1990 in Harbin) is a Chinese curler. He competed at eight World Men's Curling Championships, six Pacific-Asia Curling Championships and two Winter Olympic Games, placing fourth in both 2014 and 2018. Ba also represented China at two World Mixed Doubles Curling Championships, earning silver in 2016 and bronze in 2017 with partner Wang Rui.

== Personal life ==
Ba was educated at Harbin Sport University.
