= Kristin Skaslien =

Norwegian curler (born 1986)

- Curler
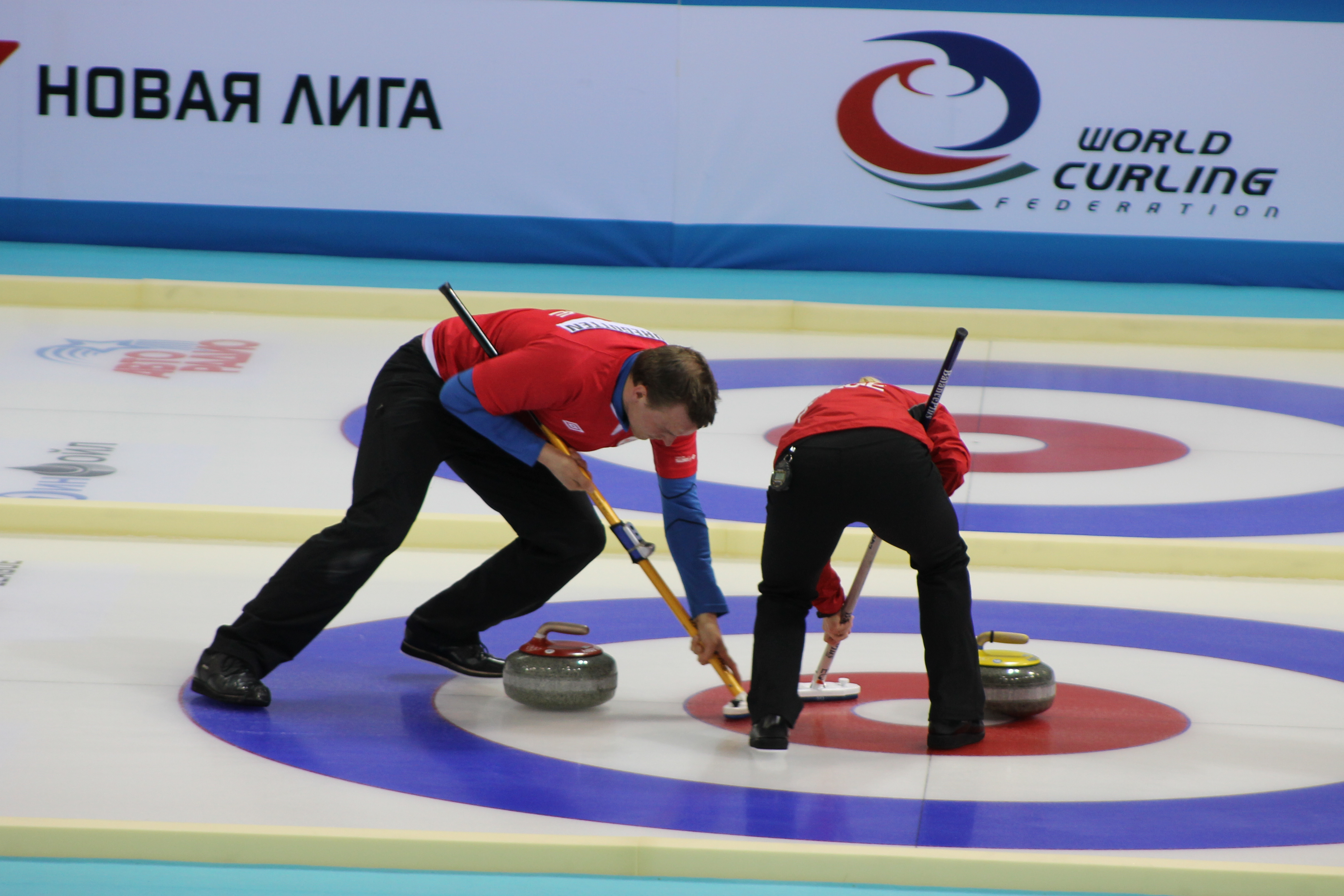
- Born: 18 January 1986 (age 40); Trondheim, Norway

Team
- Curling club: Oppdal CK, Oppdal Municipality
- Mixed doubles partner: Magnus Nedregotten

Curling career
- Member Association: Norway
- World Championship: 9 (2006, 2009, 2010, 2011, 2015, 2022, 2023, 2024, 2025)
- World Mixed Doubles Championship: 9 (2013, 2014, 2015, 2016, 2017, 2019, 2021, 2024, 2025)
- European Championship: 17 (2006, 2008, 2009, 2010, 2011, 2012, 2014, 2015, 2016, 2017, 2018, 2019, 2021, 2022, 2023, 2024, 2025)
- Olympic: 3 (2018, 2022, 2026)
Medal record
Curling
Representing Norway
Winter Olympics
Silver medal – second place	2022 Beijing	Mixed doubles
Bronze medal – third place	2018 Pyeongchang	Mixed doubles
World Championships
Silver medal – second place	2023 Sandviken
European Championships
Bronze medal – third place	2023 Aberdeen
World Mixed Doubles Championships
Silver medal – second place	2021 Aberdeen
Bronze medal – third place	2015 Sochi
Bronze medal – third place	2024 Östersund
European Mixed Championships
Silver medal – second place	2014 Copenhagen

Kristin Moen Skaslien (born 18 January 1986) is a Norwegian curler from Fornebu. With her husband Magnus Nedregotten, she is a two-time Olympic medalist in mixed doubles curling (silver in 2022, bronze in 2018). She also won a silver medal at the 2023 World Women's Curling Championship as fourth for the Norwegian women's team.

== Mixed doubles career ==
In mixed doubles, Skaslien and partner Magnus Nedregotten have represented Norway at 9 world mixed doubles curling championships. They represented Norway in the mixed doubles tournament at the 2018 Winter Olympics. They lost the bronze medal game against the Olympic Athletes from Russia, but due to a positive testing of meldonium from Alexander Krushelnitskiy, their bronze medals were stripped and given to Nedregotten and Skaslien.

Skaslien and Nedregotten won the second leg and Grand Final of the 2018–19 Curling World Cup, defeating Switzerland's Jenny Perret and Martin Rios in the final of the second leg and Canada's Laura Walker and Kirk Muyres in the grand final. In the first leg, Skaslien was paired with Sander Rølvåg but missed the final and was paired with Thomas Ulsrud in the third leg, where she lost in the final to Canada's Kadriana Sahaidak and Colton Lott.

Skaslien and Nedregotten would again find success at the 2021 World Mixed Doubles Curling Championship, finishing in second place, losing to Scotland's Jennifer Dodds and Bruce Mouat 9–7 in the final. This result would directly qualify them for the 2022 Winter Olympics. At the Olympics, Skaslien and Nedregotten would improve on their performance at the 2018 Olympics, this time winning silver, losing 8–5 to Italy's Stefania Constantini and Amos Mosaner in the final. Skaslien and Nedregotten would again medal at the 2024 World Mixed Doubles Curling Championship, winning a bronze medal. This result would also qualify them to represent Norway for the third consecutive Olympics at the 2026 Winter Olympics.

== Personal life ==
Skaslien works as a project lead for the Norwegian Curling Federation. She has an engineering degree in logistics from the Oslo and Akershus University College of Applied Sciences and a Master's in technology management from Trondheim Business School.

She is married to her mixed doubles partner, Magnus Nedregotten.
