= Magnus Nedregotten =

Norwegian curler (born 1990)

- Curler
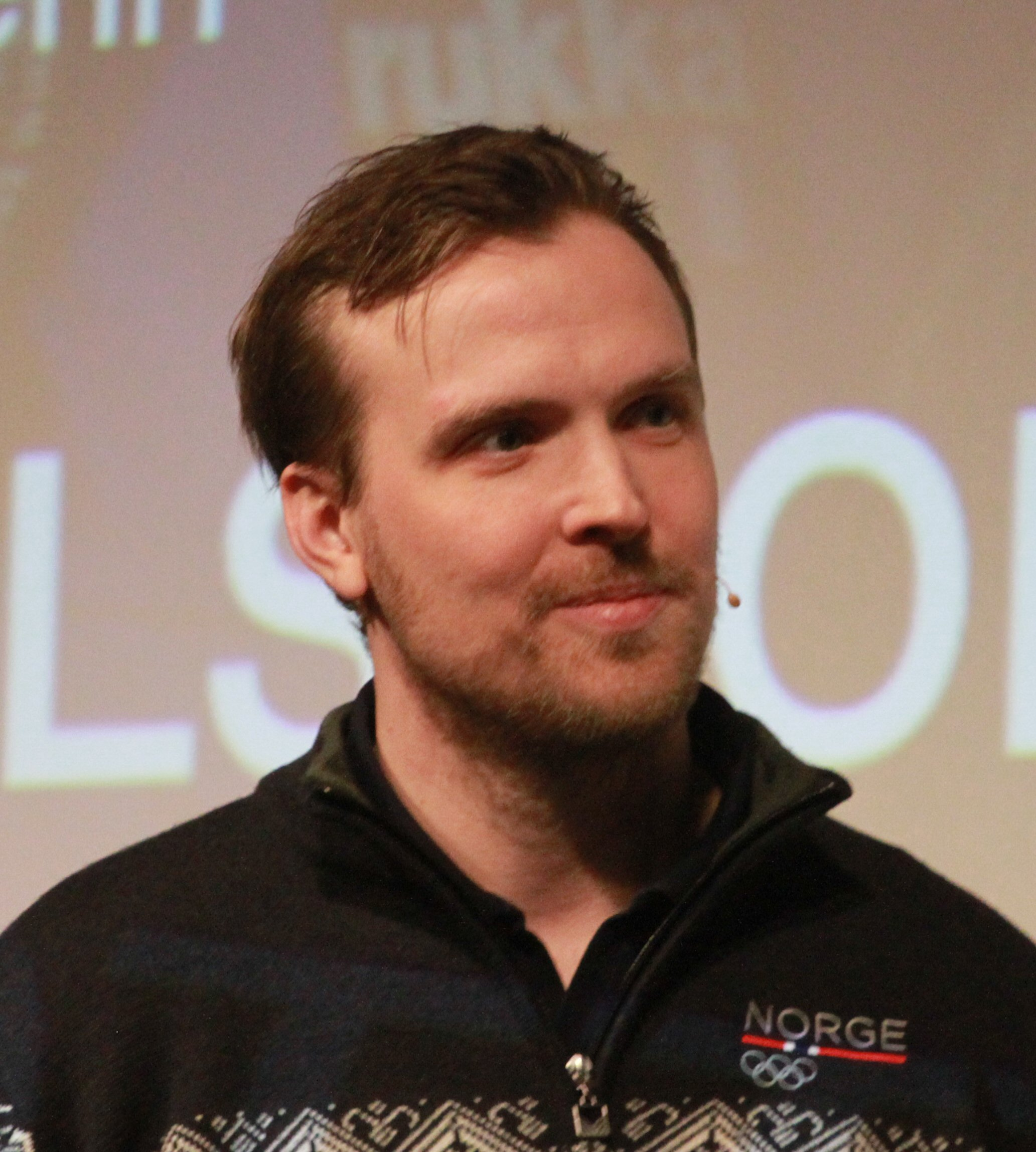
- Nedregotten in 2025
- Born: 24 October 1990 (age 36); Stavanger, Norway

Team
- Curling club: Oppdal CK, Oppdal, NOR
- Skip: Grunde Buraas
- Third: Magnus Nedregotten
- Second: Harald Dæhlin
- Lead: Heine Buraas
- Mixed doubles partner: Kristin Skaslien

Curling career
- Member Association: Norway
- World Championship: 2 (2017, 2018)
- World Mixed Doubles Championship: 9 (2013, 2014, 2015, 2016, 2017, 2019, 2021, 2024, 2025)
- European Championship: 4 (2018, 2019, 2021, 2022)
- Olympic: 3 (2018, 2022, 2026)
Medal record
Curling
Representing Norway
Winter Olympics
Silver medal – second place	2022 Beijing	Mixed doubles
Bronze medal – third place	2018 Pyeongchang	Mixed doubles
World Junior Curling Championships
Bronze medal – third place	2011 Perth
World Mixed Doubles Championships
Silver medal – second place	2021 Aberdeen
Bronze medal – third place	2015 Sochi
Bronze medal – third place	2024 Östersund
European Mixed Curling Championship
Silver medal – second place	2014 Copenhagen
Winter Universiade
Gold medal – first place	2015 Granada
Bronze medal – third place	2017 Almaty

Magnus Victor Nedregotten (born 24 October 1990) is a Norwegian curler from Oslo. He currently plays third on Team Grunde Buraas. With his wife Kristin Skaslien, he is a two-time Olympic medalist in mixed doubles curling (silver in 2022, bronze in 2018).

== Career ==
=== Juniors ===
Nedregotten represented Norway in three World Junior Curling Championships. At the 2010 World Junior Curling Championships he played lead for the Steffen Mellemseter. The team would finish in 5th place. At the 2011 World Junior Curling Championships, he played second for the team which would win a bronze medal. At the 2012 World Junior Curling Championships, Nedregotten played third for the Norwegian team, skipped by Markus Snøve Høiberg. The team would finish 4th.

Nedregotten would play on the Norwegian School of Sport Sciences team at both the 2013 and 2015 Winter Universiade, playing second in both events. In 2013, the team skipped by Høiberg finished 4th; in 2015, the team (skipped by Walstad) won the gold medal.

=== Mixed doubles ===
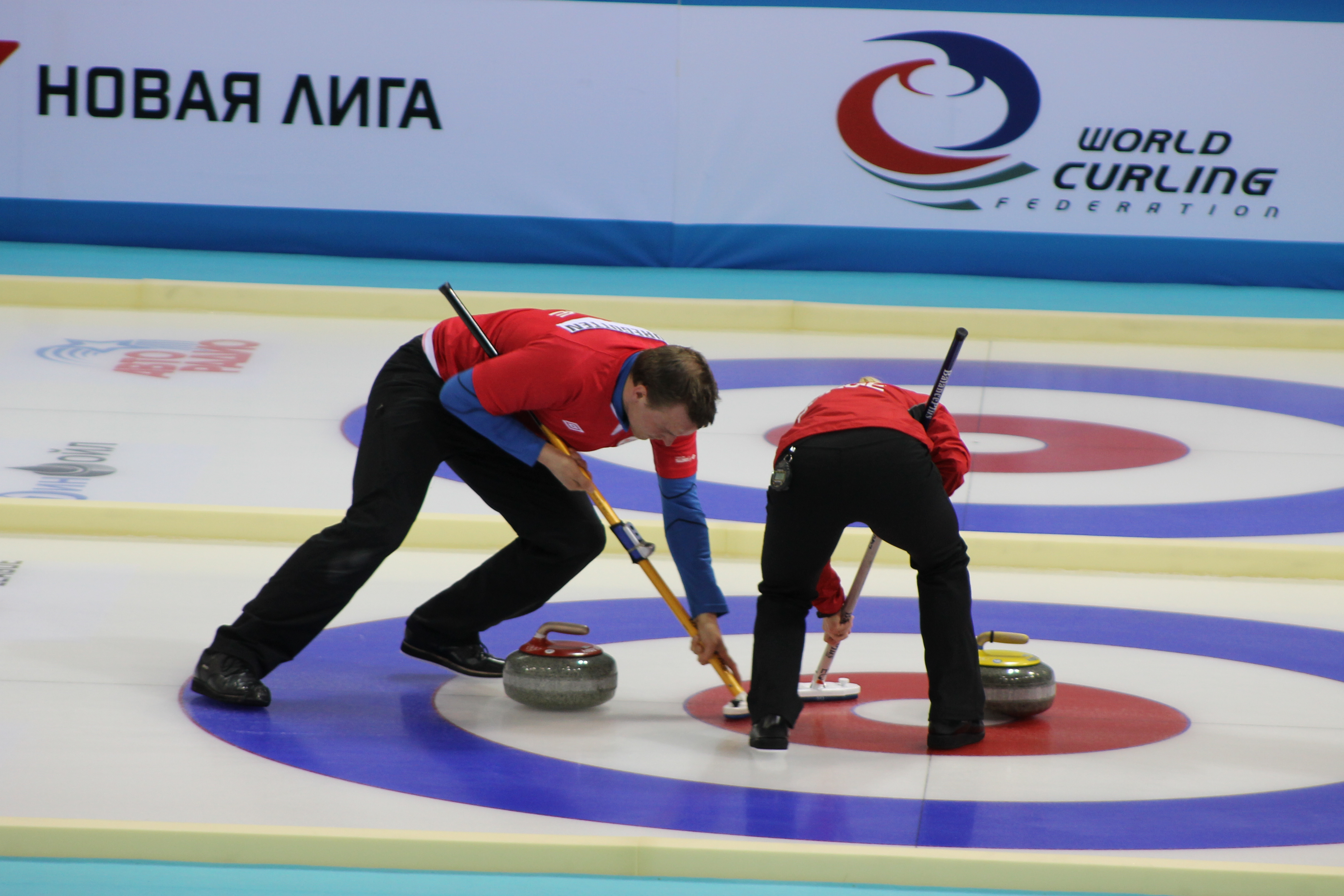
Nedregotten (left) with Skaslien

Nedregotten would find much of his success in mixed doubles curling. In mixed doubles, Nedregotten and partner Kristin Moen Skaslien have represented Norway in the 2013, 2014, 2015, 2016, 2017 and 2019 World Mixed Doubles Curling Championships. The pair have finished 4th, 5th, 3rd, 9th, 5th and 9th respectively. They represented Norway in the mixed doubles tournament at the 2018 Winter Olympics. They lost the bronze medal game against the Olympic Athletes from Russia, but due to a positive testing of meldonium from Alexander Krushelnitskiy, their bronze medals were stripped and given to Nedregotten and Skaslien.

Nedregotten and Skaslien won the second leg of the 2018–19 Curling World Cup, defeating Switzerland's Jenny Perret and Martin Rios in the final. The pair also won the Grand Final of the Curling World Cup, defeating Canada's Laura Walker and Kirk Muyres in the final.

Skaslien and Nedregotten would again find success at the 2021 World Mixed Doubles Curling Championship, finishing in second place, losing to Scotland's Jennifer Dodds and Bruce Mouat 9–7 in the final. This result would directly qualify them for the 2022 Winter Olympics. At the Olympics, Skaslien and Nedregotten would improve on their performance at the 2018 Olympics, this time winning silver, losing 8–5 to Italy's Stefani Constantini and Amos Mosaner in the final. Skaslien and Nedregotten would again medal at the 2024 World Mixed Doubles Curling Championship, winning a bronze medal. This result would also qualify them to represent Norway for the third consecutive Olympics at the 2026 Winter Olympics.

=== Mixed curling ===
Nedregotten has also represented Norway at the European Mixed Curling Championship, playing second for Walstad in both events. At the 2012 European Mixed Curling Championship, the team finished 5th, and at the 2014 European Mixed Curling Championship, the team brought back a silver medal for Norway.

=== Men's ===
Nedregotten won the Norwegian men's championship in 2016 with Høiberg skipping, though the team was not chosen to represent Norway at the World Championships. Walstad took over as skip of the team in 2016. Following a bronze medal performance at the 2017 Winter Universiade, the team qualified for the 2017 World Men's Curling Championship, where they finished 8th. The team also qualified for the 2018 World Men's Curling Championship, finishing in 5th place. The team also represented Norway at the 2018 European Curling Championships, finishing in 5th place.

== Personal life ==
Nedregotten was also a competitive skier. He attended the Norway School of Sports Sciences.

He is married to his mixed doubles partner Kristin Skaslien.
