= Anastasia Bryzgalova =

Russian curler

- Curler
- Born: 13 December 1992 (age 33); St. Petersburg, Russia

Team
- Curling club: CC Adamant, St. Petersburg

Curling career
- Member Association: Russia
- World Championship: 1 (2019)
- World Mixed Doubles Championship: 2 (2016, 2017)
- European Championship: 1 (2018)
- Olympic: 1 (2018)
Medal record
Curling
Representing Olympic Athletes from Russia
Winter Olympics
Disqualified	2018 Pyeongchang	Mixed doubles
Representing Russia
World Mixed Championship
Gold medal – first place	2016 Kazan	Mixed
World Mixed Doubles Championship
Gold medal – first place	2016 Karlstad	Mixed doubles
World Junior Curling Championships
Bronze medal – third place	2014 Flims

Anastasia Konstantinovna Bryzgalova (Russian: Анастасия Константиновна Брызгалова, IPA: [ɐnəstɐˈsʲijə brɨˈzɡaləvə]; born 13 December 1992) is a Russian curler. She currently coaches the Alina Kovaleva rink from Saint Petersburg.

== Career ==
She and Alexander Krushelnitskiy won the 2016 World Mixed Doubles Curling Championship in Karlstad, Sweden. She plays professionally for CC Adamant (St. Petersburg).

Her 2018 Olympic bronze medal was rescinded, after her partner Krushelnitskiy tested positive for meldonium at the Games.

== Personal life ==
Bryzgalova is a student at the St. Petersburg Specialized School of Olympic Reserve #2 (a technical school). Since 2016, she has also studied at the Lesgaft National State University of Physical Education, Sport and Health. She is married to her doubles partner, Alexander Krushelnitskiy.

== Awards ==
- Merited Master of Sports of Russia
- World Mixed Doubles Curling Championship: Gold (2016)
