= Jang Hye-ji =

South Korean curler (born 1997)

- Curler
- Born: 7 August 1997 (age 29); Uiseong, Gyeongsangbuk-do

Team
- Curling club: Uiseong CC, Uiseong, KOR

Curling career
- Member Association: South Korea
- World Mixed Doubles Championship: 3 (2016, 2017, 2018)
- Olympic: 1 (2018)
Medal record
Representing Gyeongbuk
Korean Mixed Doubles Championship
Gold medal – first place	2016 Uiseong
Gold medal – first place	2017 Icheon
Gold medal – first place	2019 Gangneung
Gold medal – first place	2020 Gangneung

- Jang Hye-ji
- Hangul: 장혜지
- Hanja: 張惠智
- RR: Jang Hyeji
- MR: Chang Hyeji

Jang Hye-ji (born August 7, 1997) is a South Korean curler. She competed in the 2018 Winter Olympics. She also represented Korea at three World Mixed Doubles Curling Championships.

== Career ==
She was born in 1997 in Uiseong, North Gyeongsang Province, and went to the Uiseong Girls' High School, a famous curling high school. Since then, she has been on the Korean National Mixed Doubles Team four times.

In February 2016, she formed Korea's first mixed doubles national team together with Lee Ki-jeong. At the 2016 World Mixed Doubles Curling Championship, the team made it to the round of 16, where they lost. At the 2017 World Mixed Doubles Curling Championship, they finished sixth overall.

Jang played in the mixed doubles tournament at the 2018 Winter Olympics with Lee. She was youngest curler in the tournament. On February 8, she played the Finnish team in the first game of the preliminary round and defeated them 9–4, with Finland conceding after 7 ends. In the second game, they played the Chinese team and after being down 6-1 after four ends, rallied to tie the game, only to lose in an extra end. On February 9, in their third game, they lost 3–8 to Norway, but they beat the US 9–1 in their fourth game. On February 10, in their fifth game, they lost to the Olympic Athletes from Russia, and lost their sixth match against Switzerland. In their seventh and final game, they 7–3 to Canada. They would finish the event in fifth place.
