= Alexander Krushelnitskiy =

Russian curler (born 1992)

- Curler ♂
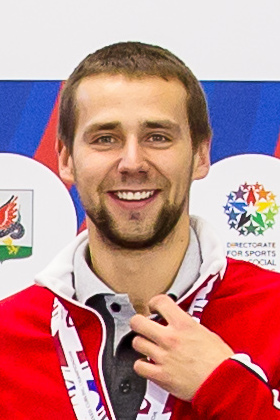
- Other names: Aleksandr Krushelnitckii; Alexander Krushelnitsky
- Born: Alexander Alexandrovich Krushelnitskiy; 20 May 1992 (age 34); Saint Petersburg, Russia

Team
- Curling club: CC Adamant, Saint Petersburg

Curling career
- Member Association: Russia
- World Mixed Doubles Championship: 3 (2014, 2016, 2017)
- Olympic: 1 (2018)
- Other appearances: World Mixed Championship: 1 (2016)
Medal record
Curling
Representing Olympic Athletes from Russia
Winter Olympics
Disqualified	2018 Pyeongchang	Mixed doubles
Representing Russia
World Mixed Championship
Gold medal – first place	2016 Kazan	Mixed
World Mixed Doubles Championship
Gold medal – first place	2016 Karlstad	Mixed doubles

Alexander Alexandrovich Krushelnitskiy (Russian: Алекса́ндр Алекса́ндрович Крушельни́цкий, IPA: [ɐlʲɪˈksandr ɐlʲɪˈksandrəvʲɪtɕ krʊʂɨlʲˈnʲitskʲɪj]; born 20 May 1992) is a Russian curler predominantly playing as skip. He was banned for four years after testing positive for Meldonium.

== Career ==
He and Anastasia Bryzgalova won the 2016 World Mixed Doubles Curling Championship in Karlstad, Sweden. He plays for CC Adamant (St. Petersburg).

On 18 February 2018, it was reported that he had failed a doping test for meldonium at the Winter Olympics, and was awaiting testing of the B sample. After the B sample was also positive, the Court of Arbitration for Sport confirmed that they were instituting formal proceedings against him.

On 22 February 2018, it was confirmed that Krushelnitskiy would be stripped of his Olympic bronze medal, due to his doping violation.

On 4 December 2018, he was banned from participating in sports for four years (retroactively starting on 12 February 2018).

== Personal life ==
Krushelnitskiy studied at the Lesgaft National State University of Physical Education, Sport and Health. He is married to his doubles partner, Anastasia Bryzgalova.

In 2019, he opened a curling school in his home city of St. Petersburg.

== Awards ==
- Master of Sports of Russia
- World Mixed Doubles Curling Championship: Gold (2016)
