= 2021 Olympic Qualification Event – Curling =

Curling at the 2022 Winter Olympics Qualification event
- Host city: Leeuwarden, Netherlands
- Dates: December 5–18, 2021
- Men's qualifiers: Norway; Italy; Denmark
- Women's qualifiers: United Kingdom; Japan; South Korea
- Mixed doubles qualifiers: Australia; United States

The Olympic qualification event (branded as the 2021 Olympic Qualification Event presented by Asito for sponsorship reasons) is an international curling tournament that was held from 5–18 December 2021 in Leeuwarden, Netherlands.

The first international curling tournament to be hosted by the Netherlands, the event was the final qualifier for curling at the 2022 Winter Olympics, and was established as part of changes to the qualification process necessitated due to the COVID-19 pandemic. The tournament was played between the men's, women's, and mixed doubles teams that qualified for the 2020 or 2021 World Curling Championships, but had yet to qualify for the Olympics, joined by additional teams who qualified through a pre-qualification tournament in November.

The top three National Olympic Committees (NOCs) in the men's and women's tournaments, and the top two NOCs in the mixed doubles tournament, advanced to the Olympic curling tournament. Denmark, Italy, and Norway qualified to the men's tournament. Great Britain, Japan, and South Korea qualified to the women's tournament, while Australia and the United States qualified in mixed doubles.

== Sponsorship controversy ==
Live streaming of the mixed doubles event was cancelled by some international broadcasters, including NBC and NHK, due to the sponsorship of a Dutch sex toy store, EasyToys, whose logo appeared on the ice. Following the mixed doubles event, the ads were replaced with the statement "#equalityforall" for the women's and men's events.

== Mixed doubles ==
=== Qualification ===
Means of qualification	Vacancies	Qualified
Host Nation	0	~~Netherlands~~
2021 World Mixed Doubles Curling Championship	11	United States; Germany; ROC; New Zealand; Australia; Hungary; Japan; Finland; South Korea; Estonia; Spain
2021 Pre-Olympic Qualification Event	3	Denmark; Latvia; Turkey
TOTAL	14	

=== World Ranking ===
Member Associations	Rank	Points
United States	5	42.954
South Korea	8	34.678
ROC	9	30.670
Finland	11	26.524
Japan	12	20.754
Australia	14	19.335
Hungary	15	16.988
Estonia	16	14.109
Turkey	17	12.089
Germany	18	11.345
Spain	20	10.047
New Zealand	21	9.794
Latvia	22	8.977
Denmark	23	6.377

=== Teams ===
Australia	Denmark	Estonia	Finland
Female: Tahli Gill; Male: Dean Hewitt	Female: Jasmin Lander; Male: Henrik Holtermann	Female: Marie Kaldvee; Male: Harri Lill	Female: Oona Kauste; Male: Aku Kauste
Germany	Hungary	Japan	Latvia
Female: Pia-Lisa Schöll; Male: Klaudius Harsch	Female: Dorottya Palancsa; Male: Zsolt Kiss	Female: Chiaki Matsumura; Male: Yasumasa Tanida	Female: Daina Barone; Male: Arnis Veidemanis
New Zealand	ROC	South Korea	Spain
Female: Mhairi-Bronté Duncan; Male: Brett Sargon	Female: Anna Sidorova; Male: Alexey Timofeev	Female: Kim Min-ji; Male: Lee Ki-jeong	Female: Oihane Unanue; Male: Mikel Unanue
Turkey	United States		
Female: Dilşat Yıldız; Male: Uğurcan Karagöz	Female: Vicky Persinger; Male: Chris Plys		

=== Round robin standings ===
Final Round Robin Standings

Key
Teams to Playoffs

Group A	W	L	W–L	DSC
Australia	6	0	–	53.05
ROC	4	2	1–0	36.92
Hungary	4	2	0–1	47.57
Germany	3	3	1–0	36.50
Denmark	3	3	0–1	61.55
Spain	1	5	–	70.59
Turkey	0	6	–	57.95

Group B	W	L	W–L	DSC
United States	6	0	–	33.27
South Korea	5	1	–	48.15
Finland	4	2	–	45.77
Latvia	2	4	1–1	39.64
Estonia	2	4	1–1	43.41
Japan	2	4	1–1	44.77
New Zealand	0	6	–	65.12

Group A Round Robin Summary Table
Pos.	Country	Australia	Denmark	Germany	Hungary	Russia Olympic Committee	Spain	Turkey	Record
1	Australia	—N/a	8–7	8–1	7–6	8–6	9–6	7–3	6–0
5	Denmark	7–8	—	7–8	3–8	11–5	9–3	8–7	3–3
4	Germany	1–8	8–7	—	2–8	6–8	9–5	7–0	3–3
3	Hungary	6–7	8–3	8–2	—	3–9	8–4	8–7	4–2
2	ROC	6–8	5–11	8–6	9–3	—	9–2	8–5	4–2
6	Spain	6–9	3–9	5–9	4–8	2–9	—	8–7	1–5
7	Turkey	3–7	7–8	0–7	7–8	5–8	7–8	—	0–6

Group B Round Robin Summary Table
Pos.	Country	Estonia	Finland	Japan	Latvia	New Zealand	South Korea	United States	Record
5	Estonia	—	4–10	8–2	8–9	10–3	8–10	6–11	2–4
3	Finland	10–4	—	9–8	8–3	8–5	4–10	5–7	4–2
6	Japan	2–8	8–9	—	8–2	9–5	4–7	6–8	2–4
4	Latvia	9–8	3–8	2–8	—	9–0	7–9	3–10	2–4
7	New Zealand	3–10	5–8	5–9	0–9	—	3–7	3–9	0–6
2	South Korea	10–8	10–4	7–4	9–7	7–3	—	3–9	5–1
1	United States	11–6	7–5	8–6	10–3	9–3	9–3	—	6–0

=== Round robin results ===
All draw times are listed in Central European Time (UTC+01:00).

==== Draw 1 ====
Sunday, December 5, 9:00

Sheet B	1	2	3	4	5	6	7	8	Final
South Korea 🔨	2	0	0	1	1	0	3	X	7
New Zealand	0	1	1	0	0	1	0	X	3

Sheet C	1	2	3	4	5	6	7	8	Final
United States 🔨	2	0	2	1	0	3	0	X	8
Japan	0	2	0	0	1	0	3	X	6

Sheet D	1	2	3	4	5	6	7	8	Final
Latvia	2	0	0	1	0	0	0	X	3
Finland 🔨	0	1	1	0	3	1	2	X	8

==== Draw 2 ====
Sunday, December 5, 12:30

Sheet B	1	2	3	4	5	6	7	8	Final
ROC 🔨	2	1	2	1	0	1	2	X	9
Spain	0	0	0	0	2	0	0	X	2

Sheet C	1	2	3	4	5	6	7	8	Final
Turkey 🔨	0	0	2	2	0	1	2	0	7
Denmark	1	3	0	0	1	0	0	3	8

Sheet D	1	2	3	4	5	6	7	8	Final
Germany	0	0	0	0	1	1	0	X	2
Hungary 🔨	1	1	2	2	0	0	2	X	8

==== Draw 3 ====
Sunday, December 5, 16:00

Sheet B	1	2	3	4	5	6	7	8	Final
Japan	1	1	0	2	2	2	X	X	8
Latvia 🔨	0	0	2	0	0	0	X	X	2

Sheet C	1	2	3	4	5	6	7	8	Final
South Korea	2	0	0	3	0	4	1	X	10
Finland 🔨	0	2	1	0	1	0	0	X	4

Sheet D	1	2	3	4	5	6	7	8	Final
Estonia 🔨	0	2	2	0	0	2	0	X	6
United States	4	0	0	3	2	0	2	X	11

==== Draw 4 ====
Sunday, December 5, 19:30

Sheet B	1	2	3	4	5	6	7	8	Final
Denmark	0	2	0	1	2	0	2	0	7
Germany 🔨	3	0	2	0	0	2	0	1	8

Sheet C	1	2	3	4	5	6	7	8	Final
ROC 🔨	0	4	1	0	2	0	2	X	9
Hungary	1	0	0	1	0	1	0	X	3

Sheet D	1	2	3	4	5	6	7	8	Final
Australia 🔨	1	0	1	1	0	0	4	X	7
Turkey	0	1	0	0	1	1	0	X	3

==== Draw 5 ====
Monday, December 6, 10:00

Sheet B	1	2	3	4	5	6	7	8	Final
New Zealand	0	1	0	1	0	3	0	X	5
Finland 🔨	3	0	3	0	1	0	1	X	8

Sheet C	1	2	3	4	5	6	7	8	9	Final
Estonia	0	1	0	3	0	2	0	2	0	8
Latvia 🔨	1	0	2	0	3	0	2	0	1	9

Sheet D	1	2	3	4	5	6	7	8	Final
Japan	0	1	2	0	0	1	0	0	4
South Korea 🔨	2	0	0	1	2	0	1	1	7

==== Draw 6 ====
Monday, December 6, 14:30

Sheet B	1	2	3	4	5	6	7	8	Final
Spain	1	1	0	1	0	0	1	0	4
Hungary 🔨	0	0	1	0	5	1	0	1	8

Sheet C	1	2	3	4	5	6	7	8	Final
Australia	2	0	1	2	1	2	X	X	8
Germany 🔨	0	1	0	0	0	0	X	X	1

Sheet D	1	2	3	4	5	6	7	8	Final
Denmark 🔨	3	0	2	0	2	0	4	X	11
ROC	0	1	0	3	0	1	0	X	5

==== Draw 7 ====
Monday, December 6, 19:00

Sheet B	1	2	3	4	5	6	7	8	Final
Estonia	2	0	1	1	0	2	2	X	8
Japan 🔨	0	1	0	0	1	0	0	X	2

Sheet C	1	2	3	4	5	6	7	8	Final
Finland	0	0	2	1	0	1	0	1	5
United States 🔨	1	1	0	0	2	0	3	0	7

Sheet D	1	2	3	4	5	6	7	8	Final
New Zealand	0	0	0	0	0	0	X	X	0
Latvia 🔨	2	1	1	3	1	1	X	X	9

==== Draw 8 ====
Tuesday, December 7, 9:00

Sheet B	1	2	3	4	5	6	7	8	Final
Australia	0	1	0	0	3	0	3	1	8
Denmark 🔨	2	0	2	2	0	1	0	0	7

Sheet C	1	2	3	4	5	6	7	8	Final
Hungary 🔨	2	0	0	2	0	4	0	0	8
Turkey	0	1	1	0	1	0	2	2	7

Sheet D	1	2	3	4	5	6	7	8	Final
Spain	0	2	0	0	1	0	2	X	5
Germany 🔨	1	0	3	2	0	3	0	X	9

==== Draw 9 ====
Tuesday, December 7, 12:30

Sheet B	1	2	3	4	5	6	7	8	Final
Latvia	0	1	0	0	2	0	0	X	3
United States 🔨	3	0	3	1	0	1	2	X	10

Sheet C	1	2	3	4	5	6	7	8	Final
Japan 🔨	0	0	2	0	2	0	2	3	9
New Zealand	1	1	0	1	0	2	0	0	5

Sheet D	1	2	3	4	5	6	7	8	9	Final
South Korea	0	0	0	4	2	0	0	2	2	10
Estonia 🔨	1	2	2	0	0	1	2	0	0	8

==== Draw 10 ====
Tuesday, December 7, 16:00

Sheet B	1	2	3	4	5	6	7	8	Final
Germany 🔨	2	1	1	1	1	1	X	X	7
Turkey	0	0	0	0	0	0	X	X	0

Sheet C	1	2	3	4	5	6	7	8	Final
Denmark 🔨	3	2	1	3	0	0	0	X	9
Spain	0	0	0	0	1	1	1	X	3

Sheet D	1	2	3	4	5	6	7	8	Final
ROC	0	1	0	2	3	0	0	0	6
Australia 🔨	2	0	2	0	0	2	1	1	8

==== Draw 11 ====
Tuesday, December 7, 19:30

Sheet B	1	2	3	4	5	6	7	8	Final
Finland	0	2	4	0	0	3	1	X	10
Estonia 🔨	1	0	0	2	1	0	0	X	4

Sheet C	1	2	3	4	5	6	7	8	Final
Latvia	0	0	0	2	0	4	0	1	7
South Korea 🔨	3	2	2	0	1	0	1	0	9

Sheet D	1	2	3	4	5	6	7	8	Final
United States 🔨	0	5	0	2	2	0	X	X	9
New Zealand	1	0	1	0	0	1	X	X	3

==== Draw 12 ====
Wednesday, December 8, 10:00

Sheet B	1	2	3	4	5	6	7	8	9	Final
Hungary 🔨	2	0	0	1	0	1	0	2	0	6
Australia	0	1	3	0	1	0	1	0	1	7

Sheet C	1	2	3	4	5	6	7	8	Final
Germany 🔨	0	1	0	0	2	0	3	0	6
ROC	3	0	1	2	0	1	0	1	8

Sheet D	1	2	3	4	5	6	7	8	9	Final
Turkey	0	1	0	1	0	1	0	4	0	7
Spain 🔨	1	0	2	0	2	0	2	0	1	8

==== Draw 13 ====
Wednesday, December 8, 14:30

Sheet B	1	2	3	4	5	6	7	8	Final
United States 🔨	0	2	1	2	0	4	X	X	9
South Korea	1	0	0	0	2	0	X	X	3

Sheet C	1	2	3	4	5	6	7	8	Final
New Zealand	0	0	0	2	0	1	0	X	3
Estonia 🔨	2	2	3	0	1	0	2	X	10

Sheet D	1	2	3	4	5	6	7	8	Final
Finland 🔨	0	0	2	0	3	3	0	1	9
Japan	2	3	0	2	0	0	1	0	8

==== Draw 14 ====
Wednesday, December 8, 19:00

Sheet B	1	2	3	4	5	6	7	8	Final
Turkey 🔨	0	0	2	0	1	0	2	0	5
ROC	1	1	0	3	0	2	0	1	8

Sheet C	1	2	3	4	5	6	7	8	Final
Spain 🔨	0	0	0	2	2	0	2	0	6
Australia	1	1	3	0	0	2	0	2	9

Sheet D	1	2	3	4	5	6	7	8	Final
Hungary 🔨	1	1	1	0	3	0	2	X	8
Denmark	0	0	0	2	0	1	0	X	3

=== Playoffs ===
Qualification semifinals
B2	South Korea	7
A3	Hungary	5
A2	ROC	10
B3	Finland	5

Qualification finals
A1	Australia	6
B2	South Korea	5
B1	United States	6
A2	ROC	4

==== Semifinal 1 ====
Thursday, December 9, 9:00

Sheet D	1	2	3	4	5	6	7	8	Final
South Korea 🔨	2	0	0	1	0	1	0	3	7
Hungary	0	1	1	0	1	0	2	0	5

Player percentages
South Korea		Hungary	
Kim Min-ji	61%	Dorottya Palancsa	75%
Lee Ki-jeong	67%	Zsolt Kiss	73%
Total	65%	Total	74%

==== Semifinal 2 ====
Thursday, December 9, 9:00

Sheet B	1	2	3	4	5	6	7	8	Final
ROC 🔨	2	0	0	2	1	0	5	X	10
Finland	0	3	1	0	0	1	0	X	5

Player percentages
ROC		Finland	
Anna Sidorova	77%	Oona Kauste	82%
Alexey Timofeev	79%	Aku Kauste	81%
Total	78%	Total	81%

==== Qualification Game 1 ====
Thursday, December 9, 15:00

Sheet C	1	2	3	4	5	6	7	8	Final
Australia 🔨	0	1	0	1	0	3	0	1	6
South Korea	1	0	2	0	1	0	1	0	5

Player percentages
Australia		South Korea	
Tahli Gill	69%	Kim Min-ji	78%
Dean Hewitt	71%	Lee Ki-jeong	65%
Total	70%	Total	70%

==== Qualification Game 2 ====
Thursday, December 9, 18:00

Sheet C	1	2	3	4	5	6	7	8	Final
United States 🔨	1	2	0	1	0	1	0	1	6
ROC	0	0	1	0	1	0	2	0	4

Player percentages
United States		ROC	
Vicky Persinger	82%	Anna Sidorova	69%
Chris Plys	80%	Alexey Timofeev	83%
Total	81%	Total	77%

== Men ==
=== Qualification ===
Means of qualification	Vacancies	Qualified
Host Nation	1	Netherlands
2021 World Men's Curling Championship	6	Italy; Norway; Japan; Germany; Denmark; South Korea
2021 Pre-Olympic Qualification Event	2	Czech Republic; Finland
TOTAL	9	

=== World Ranking ===
Member Associations	Rank	Points
Japan	6	39.715
Norway	7	39.161
Italy	8	37.658
South Korea	9	33.070
Germany	11	20.622
Denmark	12	20.190
Netherlands	13	18.302
Czech Republic	16	9.916
Finland	24	7.046

=== Teams ===
Czech Republic	Denmark	Finland
Skip: Lukáš Klíma; Third: Marek Černovský; Second: Radek Boháč; Lead: Jiří Candra; Alternate: Samuel Mokriš	Skip: Mikkel Krause; Third: Mads Nørgård; Second: Henrik Holtermann; Lead: Kasper Wiksten; Alternate: Tobias Thune	Skip: Kalle Kiiskinen; Third: Teemu Salo; Second: Leo Ouni; Lead: Paavo Kuosmanen; Alternate: Jermu Pöllänen
Germany	Italy	Japan
Skip: Sixten Totzek; Third: Marc Muskatewitz; Second: Joshua Sutor; Lead: Dominik Greindl; Alternate: Magnus Sutor	Skip: Joël Retornaz; Third: Amos Mosaner; Second: Sebastiano Arman; Lead: Simone Gonin; Alternate: Mattia Giovanella	Skip: Yuta Matsumura; Third: Tetsuro Shimizu; Second: Yasumasa Tanida; Lead: Shinya Abe; Alternate: Kosuke Aita
Netherlands	Norway	South Korea
Skip: Wouter Gösgens; Third: Jaap van Dorp; Second: Laurens Hoekman; Lead: Carlo Glasbergen; Alternate: Tobias van den Hurk	Skip: Steffen Walstad; Third: Torger Nergård; Second: Markus Høiberg; Lead: Magnus Vågberg; Alternate: Magnus Nedregotten	Skip: Kim Chang-min; Third: Kim Soo-hyuk; Second: Jeon Jae-ik; Lead: Kim Hak-kyun

=== Round robin standings ===
Final Round Robin Standings

Key
Qualified for the 2022 Olympics via Round Robin
Teams to Playoffs

Country	Skip	W	L	W–L	DSC
Norway	Steffen Walstad	8	0	–	36.81
Italy	Joël Retornaz	7	1	–	25.08
Czech Republic	Lukáš Klíma	5	3	–	39.51
Denmark	Mikkel Krause	4	4	–	68.73
Finland	Kalle Kiiskinen	3	5	2–0	32.35
Japan	Yuta Matsumura	3	5	1–1	34.83
Netherlands	Wouter Gösgens	3	5	0–2	25.52
South Korea	Kim Chang-min	2	6	–	30.56
Germany	Sixten Totzek	1	7	–	30.33

Round Robin Summary Table
Pos.	Country	Norway	Italy	Czech Republic	Denmark	Finland	Japan	Netherlands	South Korea	Germany	Record
1	Norway	—	5–4	8–5	7–4	7–4	6–4	8–5	10–6	7–4	8–0
2	Italy	4–5	—	7–2	6–5	9–5	9–4	7–6	7–3	11–4	7–1
3	Czech Republic	5–8	2–7	—	7–5	8–3	11–6	4–7	14–6	7–4	5–3
4	Denmark	4–7	5–6	5–7	—	9–2	11–3	5–4	7–8	8–2	4–4
5	Finland	4–7	5–9	3–8	2–9	—	8–2	7–5	5–3	6–8	3–5
6	Japan	4–6	4–9	6–11	3–11	2–8	—	11–5	6–5	6–5	3–5
7	Netherlands	5–8	6–7	7–4	4–5	5–7	5–11	—	8–3	6–5	3–5
8	South Korea	6–10	3–7	6–14	8–7	3–5	5–6	3–8	—	10–1	2–6
9	Germany	4–7	4–11	4–7	2–8	8–6	5–6	5–6	1–10	—	1–7

=== Round robin results ===
All draw times are listed in Central European Time (UTC+01:00).

==== Draw 1 ====
Saturday, December 11, 14:00

Sheet A	1	2	3	4	5	6	7	8	9	10	Final
Italy (Retornaz)	0	2	1	1	1	0	0	0	2	X	7
South Korea (Kim) 🔨	1	0	0	0	0	0	0	2	0	X	3

Sheet B	1	2	3	4	5	6	7	8	9	10	Final
Germany (Totzek)	0	1	0	0	1	0	1	0	2	0	5
Japan (Matsumura) 🔨	1	0	1	0	0	2	0	1	0	1	6

Sheet C	1	2	3	4	5	6	7	8	9	10	Final
Netherlands (Gösgens)	0	1	0	0	0	1	0	0	2	0	4
Denmark (Krause) 🔨	1	0	0	1	1	0	0	1	0	1	5

Sheet D	1	2	3	4	5	6	7	8	9	10	Final
Czech Republic (Klíma) 🔨	0	0	0	1	1	0	1	0	2	X	5
Norway (Walstad)	1	0	2	0	0	3	0	2	0	X	8

==== Draw 2 ====
Sunday, December 12, 9:00

Sheet A	1	2	3	4	5	6	7	8	9	10	Final
Japan (Matsumura) 🔨	0	1	0	1	0	1	0	0	X	X	3
Denmark (Krause)	1	0	2	0	2	0	3	3	X	X	11

Sheet B	1	2	3	4	5	6	7	8	9	10	Final
South Korea (Kim)	0	1	0	1	0	2	0	2	0	X	6
Norway (Walstad) 🔨	1	0	2	0	1	0	3	0	3	X	10

Sheet C	1	2	3	4	5	6	7	8	9	10	Final
Czech Republic (Klíma)	0	1	1	2	0	0	0	1	2	X	7
Germany (Totzek) 🔨	1	0	0	0	1	1	1	0	0	X	4

Sheet D	1	2	3	4	5	6	7	8	9	10	Final
Finland (Kiiskinen)	0	0	2	0	1	1	0	1	0	0	5
Italy (Retornaz) 🔨	0	2	0	2	0	0	2	0	1	2	9

==== Draw 3 ====
Sunday, December 12, 19:00

Sheet A	1	2	3	4	5	6	7	8	9	10	Final
Finland (Kiiskinen) 🔨	1	0	0	1	0	0	1	0	X	X	3
Czech Republic (Klíma)	0	2	2	0	0	1	0	3	X	X	8

Sheet B	1	2	3	4	5	6	7	8	9	10	11	Final
Italy (Retornaz) 🔨	0	0	2	0	0	1	0	2	0	0	1	6
Denmark (Krause)	0	0	0	0	3	0	1	0	0	1	0	5

Sheet C	1	2	3	4	5	6	7	8	9	10	Final
Norway (Walstad)	0	0	1	0	0	1	0	0	4	X	6
Japan (Matsumura) 🔨	0	0	0	0	2	0	0	2	0	X	4

Sheet D	1	2	3	4	5	6	7	8	9	10	11	Final
Germany (Totzek)	0	0	0	0	1	0	0	0	2	2	0	5
Netherlands (Gösgens) 🔨	1	0	1	0	0	2	1	0	0	0	1	6

==== Draw 4 ====
Monday, December 13, 14:00

Sheet A	1	2	3	4	5	6	7	8	9	10	Final
Germany (Totzek) 🔨	0	0	1	1	0	0	0	2	0	X	4
Norway (Walstad)	0	2	0	0	0	2	1	0	2	X	7

Sheet B	1	2	3	4	5	6	7	8	9	10	Final
Netherlands (Gösgens) 🔨	0	3	0	0	0	0	1	1	1	1	7
Czech Republic (Klíma)	0	0	1	1	1	1	0	0	0	0	4

Sheet C	1	2	3	4	5	6	7	8	9	10	Final
Denmark (Krause) 🔨	1	1	2	0	2	3	X	X	X	X	9
Finland (Kiiskinen)	0	0	0	2	0	0	X	X	X	X	2

Sheet D	1	2	3	4	5	6	7	8	9	10	Final
Japan (Matsumura) 🔨	0	1	1	0	1	1	0	1	1	0	6
South Korea (Kim)	0	0	0	1	0	0	3	0	0	1	5

==== Draw 5 ====
Tuesday, December 14, 9:00

Sheet A	1	2	3	4	5	6	7	8	9	10	Final
Netherlands (Gösgens) 🔨	1	0	2	0	0	1	0	0	2	0	6
Italy (Retornaz)	0	2	0	2	1	0	0	1	0	1	7

Sheet B	1	2	3	4	5	6	7	8	9	10	11	Final
Finland (Kiiskinen)	0	0	2	0	0	1	2	0	0	1	0	6
Germany (Totzek) 🔨	1	1	0	0	3	0	0	0	1	0	2	8

Sheet C	1	2	3	4	5	6	7	8	9	10	Final
South Korea (Kim) 🔨	0	1	0	0	1	2	0	2	0	X	6
Czech Republic (Klíma)	3	0	2	4	0	0	2	0	3	X	14

Sheet D	1	2	3	4	5	6	7	8	9	10	Final
Norway (Walstad) 🔨	2	0	2	0	0	1	0	1	1	X	7
Denmark (Krause)	0	1	0	1	1	0	1	0	0	X	4

==== Draw 6 ====
Tuesday, December 14, 19:00

Sheet A	1	2	3	4	5	6	7	8	9	10	Final
Czech Republic (Klíma) 🔨	2	0	1	0	1	0	4	0	3	X	11
Japan (Matsumura)	0	1	0	2	0	1	0	2	0	X	6

Sheet B	1	2	3	4	5	6	7	8	9	10	Final
Denmark (Krause)	1	1	1	0	1	0	1	0	2	0	7
South Korea (Kim) 🔨	0	0	0	3	0	3	0	1	0	1	8

Sheet C	1	2	3	4	5	6	7	8	9	10	11	Final
Italy (Retornaz) 🔨	0	0	0	2	0	0	0	1	0	1	0	4
Norway (Walstad)	0	0	0	0	1	1	0	0	2	0	1	5

Sheet D	1	2	3	4	5	6	7	8	9	10	Final
Netherlands (Gösgens)	0	1	1	0	1	0	0	1	0	1	5
Finland (Kiiskinen) 🔨	2	0	0	2	0	1	0	0	2	0	7

==== Draw 7 ====
Wednesday, December 15, 14:00

Sheet A	1	2	3	4	5	6	7	8	9	10	Final
Norway (Walstad) 🔨	2	0	1	0	2	0	0	0	1	1	7
Finland (Kiiskinen)	0	1	0	1	0	0	2	0	0	0	4

Sheet B	1	2	3	4	5	6	7	8	9	10	Final
Czech Republic (Klíma)	0	0	0	0	2	0	0	0	X	X	2
Italy (Retornaz) 🔨	0	2	0	1	0	2	1	1	X	X	7

Sheet C	1	2	3	4	5	6	7	8	9	10	Final
Japan (Matsumura) 🔨	3	0	2	0	0	2	0	2	2	X	11
Netherlands (Gösgens)	0	2	0	2	0	0	1	0	0	X	5

Sheet D	1	2	3	4	5	6	7	8	9	10	Final
South Korea (Kim) 🔨	2	2	0	3	1	2	X	X	X	X	10
Germany (Totzek)	0	0	1	0	0	0	X	X	X	X	1

==== Draw 8 ====
Thursday, December 16, 9:00

Sheet A	1	2	3	4	5	6	7	8	9	10	Final
Denmark (Krause)	0	3	2	0	2	1	X	X	X	X	8
Germany (Totzek) 🔨	1	0	0	1	0	0	X	X	X	X	2

Sheet B	1	2	3	4	5	6	7	8	9	10	Final
Norway (Walstad) 🔨	0	2	1	0	2	0	2	1	0	X	8
Netherlands (Gösgens)	0	0	0	2	0	1	0	0	2	X	5

Sheet C	1	2	3	4	5	6	7	8	9	10	Final
Finland (Kiiskinen)	0	0	1	0	0	2	0	0	1	1	5
South Korea (Kim) 🔨	0	0	0	1	1	0	0	1	0	0	3

Sheet D	1	2	3	4	5	6	7	8	9	10	Final
Italy (Retornaz) 🔨	0	2	0	2	1	0	2	0	2	X	9
Japan (Matsumura)	1	0	1	0	0	1	0	1	0	X	4

==== Draw 9 ====
Thursday, December 16, 19:00

Sheet A	1	2	3	4	5	6	7	8	9	10	Final
South Korea (Kim) 🔨	1	0	0	0	1	0	1	0	X	X	3
Netherlands (Gösgens)	0	1	1	2	0	1	0	3	X	X	8

Sheet B	1	2	3	4	5	6	7	8	9	10	Final
Japan (Matsumura)	0	1	0	0	1	0	0	0	X	X	2
Finland (Kiiskinen) 🔨	1	0	0	2	0	1	3	1	X	X	8

Sheet C	1	2	3	4	5	6	7	8	9	10	Final
Germany (Totzek) 🔨	1	0	0	0	1	0	2	0	X	X	4
Italy (Retornaz)	0	1	1	1	0	4	0	4	X	X	11

Sheet D	1	2	3	4	5	6	7	8	9	10	Final
Denmark (Krause) 🔨	0	0	1	0	3	0	0	0	1	0	5
Czech Republic (Klíma)	0	0	0	3	0	1	1	1	0	1	7

=== Playoffs ===
Qualification Game 1
2	Italy	6
3	Czech Republic	5

Qualification Game 2
3	Czech Republic	5
4	Denmark	8

Qualified
Italy
Denmark

==== Qualification Game 1 ====
Friday, December 17, 15:00

Sheet B	1	2	3	4	5	6	7	8	9	10	Final
Italy (Retornaz) 🔨	3	0	1	0	1	0	0	1	0	0	6
Czech Republic (Klíma)	0	1	0	2	0	0	1	0	1	0	5

Player percentages
Italy		Czech Republic	
Simone Gonin	85%	Jiří Candra	88%
Sebastiano Arman	93%	Radek Boháč	78%
Amos Mosaner	93%	Marek Černovský	68%
Joël Retornaz	90%	Lukáš Klíma	78%
Total	90%	Total	78%

==== Qualification Game 2 ====
Saturday, December 18, 15:00

Sheet B	1	2	3	4	5	6	7	8	9	10	Final
Czech Republic (Klíma) 🔨	1	0	1	1	1	0	1	0	0	X	5
Denmark (Krause)	0	1	0	0	0	2	0	3	2	X	8

Player percentages
Czech Republic		Denmark	
Jiří Candra	71%	Kasper Wiksten	79%
Radek Boháč	74%	Henrik Holtermann	75%
Marek Černovský	83%	Mads Nørgård	79%
Lukáš Klíma	63%	Mikkel Krause	86%
Total	73%	Total	80%

== Women ==
=== Qualification ===
Means of qualification	Vacancies	Qualified
Host Nation	0	~~Netherlands~~
2021 World Women's Curling Championship	7	South Korea; Great Britain; Germany; Japan; Czech Republic; Italy; Estonia
2021 Pre-Olympic Qualification Event	2	Latvia; Turkey
TOTAL	9	

=== World Ranking ===
Member Associations	Rank	Points
South Korea	3	62.025
Japan	7	47.099
Great Britain	8	46.677
Germany	11	21.624
Czech Republic	12	20.464
Italy	13	14.241
Latvia	14	11.213
Estonia	16	10.654
Turkey	18	9.926

=== Teams ===
Czech Republic	Estonia	Germany
Skip: Anna Kubešková; Third: Alžběta Baudyšová; Second: Michaela Baudyšová; Lead: Ežen Kolčevská; Alternate: Klára Svatoňová	Fourth: Kerli Laidsalu; Skip: Liisa Turmann; Second: Heili Grossmann; Lead: Erika Tuvike; Alternate: Karoliine Kaare	Skip: Daniela Jentsch; Third: Emira Abbes; Second: Mia Höhne; Lead: Analena Jentsch; Alternate: Klara-Hermine Fomm
Great Britain	Italy	Japan
Skip: Eve Muirhead; Third: Vicky Wright; Second: Jennifer Dodds; Lead: Hailey Duff; Alternate: Mili Smith	Skip: Stefania Constantini; Third: Marta Lo Deserto; Second: Angela Romei; Lead: Giulia Zardini Lacedelli; Alternate: Elena Dami	Skip: Satsuki Fujisawa; Third: Chinami Yoshida; Second: Yumi Suzuki; Lead: Yurika Yoshida; Alternate: Kotomi Ishizaki
Latvia	South Korea	Turkey
Fourth: Evelīna Barone; Skip: Santa Blumberga-Bērziņa; Second: Ieva Rudzīte; Lead: Ieva Krusta; Alternate: Tīna Siliņa	Skip: Kim Eun-jung; Third: Kim Kyeong-ae; Second: Kim Cho-hi; Lead: Kim Seon-yeong; Alternate: Kim Yeong-mi	Skip: Dilşat Yıldız; Third: Öznur Polat; Second: Berfin Şengül; Lead: Ayşe Gözütok; Alternate: Mihriban Polat

=== Round robin standings ===
Final Round Robin Standings

Key
Qualified for the 2022 Olympics via Round Robin
Teams to Playoffs

Country	Skip	W	L	W–L	DSC
Great Britain	Eve Muirhead	6	2	1–1	27.39
South Korea	Kim Eun-jung	6	2	1–1	34.27
Japan	Satsuki Fujisawa	6	2	1–1	34.61
Latvia	Santa Blumberga-Bērziņa	4	4	1–0	61.26
Italy	Stefania Constantini	4	4	0–1	71.39
Germany	Daniela Jentsch	3	5	1–0	53.81
Turkey	Dilşat Yıldız	3	5	0–1	75.38
Estonia	Liisa Turmann	2	6	1–0	37.11
Czech Republic	Anna Kubešková	2	6	0–1	47.53

Round Robin Summary Table
Pos.	Country	Czech Republic	Estonia	Germany	Great Britain	Italy	Japan	Latvia	South Korea	Turkey	Record
9	Czech Republic	—	5–6	10–4	5–7	6–13	2–6	6–9	6–12	7–2	2–6
8	Estonia	6–5	—	1–7	2–9	2–6	2–9	6–8	5–10	12–11	2–6
6	Germany	4–10	7–1	—	4–7	6–7	6–7	8–7	8–10	10–7	3–5
1	Great Britain	7–5	9–2	7–4	—	8–1	8–5	9–5	4–8	3–7	6–2
5	Italy	13–6	6–2	7–6	1–8	—	6–11	4–8	1–7	12–4	4–4
3	Japan	6–2	9–2	7–6	5–8	11–6	—	9–1	8–4	5–8	6–2
4	Latvia	9–6	8–6	7–8	5–9	8–4	1–9	—	4–10	8–7	4–4
2	South Korea	12–6	10–5	10–8	8–4	7–1	4–8	10–4	—	7–12	6–2
7	Turkey	2–7	11–12	7–10	7–3	4–12	8–5	7–8	12–7	—	3–5

=== Round robin results ===
All draw times are listed in Central European Time (UTC+01:00).

==== Draw 1 ====
Saturday, December 11, 9:00

Sheet A	1	2	3	4	5	6	7	8	9	10	Final
Japan (Fujisawa) 🔨	2	0	1	0	1	3	0	4	X	X	11
Italy (Constantini)	0	2	0	2	0	0	2	0	X	X	6

Sheet B	1	2	3	4	5	6	7	8	9	10	Final
Turkey (Yıldız)	0	0	4	0	0	2	2	0	2	1	11
Estonia (Turmann) 🔨	1	1	0	3	3	0	0	4	0	0	12

Sheet C	1	2	3	4	5	6	7	8	9	10	Final
Great Britain (Muirhead) 🔨	0	1	1	1	0	1	0	2	1	0	7
Czech Republic (Kubešková)	1	0	0	0	1	0	2	0	0	1	5

Sheet D	1	2	3	4	5	6	7	8	9	10	Final
South Korea (Kim) 🔨	3	1	2	0	0	2	0	2	X	X	10
Latvia (Blumberga-Bērziņa)	0	0	0	2	1	0	1	0	X	X	4

==== Draw 2 ====
Saturday, December 11, 19:00

Sheet A	1	2	3	4	5	6	7	8	9	10	Final
Estonia (Turmann) 🔨	0	1	0	1	0	1	0	0	1	2	6
Czech Republic (Kubešková)	0	0	2	0	1	0	1	1	0	0	5

Sheet B	1	2	3	4	5	6	7	8	9	10	Final
Italy (Constantini)	0	1	0	0	2	0	0	1	0	X	4
Latvia (Blumberga-Bērziņa) 🔨	2	0	2	1	0	1	1	0	1	X	8

Sheet C	1	2	3	4	5	6	7	8	9	10	Final
South Korea (Kim) 🔨	2	1	0	0	2	0	0	2	0	X	7
Turkey (Yıldız)	0	0	2	3	0	1	1	0	5	X	12

Sheet D	1	2	3	4	5	6	7	8	9	10	Final
Germany (Jentsch)	0	1	0	0	1	0	2	0	2	0	6
Japan (Fujisawa) 🔨	1	0	1	0	0	3	0	1	0	1	7

==== Draw 3 ====
Sunday, December 12, 14:00

Sheet A	1	2	3	4	5	6	7	8	9	10	Final
Germany (Jentsch)	0	0	2	0	0	2	3	0	0	1	8
South Korea (Kim) 🔨	0	2	0	3	1	0	0	3	1	0	10

Sheet B	1	2	3	4	5	6	7	8	9	10	Final
Japan (Fujisawa)	0	0	1	1	0	0	2	1	1	X	6
Czech Republic (Kubešková) 🔨	0	1	0	0	1	0	0	0	0	X	2

Sheet C	1	2	3	4	5	6	7	8	9	10	Final
Latvia (Blumberga-Bērziņa) 🔨	0	2	1	0	0	1	2	1	0	1	8
Estonia (Turmann)	2	0	0	1	2	0	0	0	1	0	6

Sheet D	1	2	3	4	5	6	7	8	9	10	Final
Turkey (Yıldız)	1	0	2	0	1	2	1	0	X	X	7
Great Britain (Muirhead) 🔨	0	2	0	0	0	0	0	1	X	X	3

==== Draw 4 ====
Monday, December 13, 9:00

Sheet A	1	2	3	4	5	6	7	8	9	10	Final
Turkey (Yıldız) 🔨	1	0	0	3	0	1	0	0	2	0	7
Latvia (Blumberga-Bērziņa)	0	1	3	0	1	0	1	1	0	1	8

Sheet B	1	2	3	4	5	6	7	8	9	10	Final
Great Britain (Muirhead) 🔨	0	0	1	0	0	2	0	1	0	0	4
South Korea (Kim)	0	3	0	1	0	0	1	0	1	2	8

Sheet C	1	2	3	4	5	6	7	8	9	10	Final
Czech Republic (Kubešková)	1	0	0	5	3	0	0	1	X	X	10
Germany (Jentsch) 🔨	0	1	1	0	0	1	1	0	X	X	4

Sheet D	1	2	3	4	5	6	7	8	9	10	Final
Estonia (Turmann)	0	1	0	0	0	0	1	0	X	X	2
Italy (Constantini) 🔨	0	0	1	2	1	2	0	0	X	X	6

==== Draw 5 ====
Monday, December 13, 19:00

Sheet A	1	2	3	4	5	6	7	8	9	10	Final
Great Britain (Muirhead) 🔨	0	2	1	0	2	0	3	0	0	X	8
Japan (Fujisawa)	0	0	0	2	0	1	0	1	1	X	5

Sheet B	1	2	3	4	5	6	7	8	9	10	Final
Germany (Jentsch) 🔨	1	0	3	0	1	0	0	2	0	3	10
Turkey (Yıldız)	0	1	0	1	0	2	2	0	1	0	7

Sheet C	1	2	3	4	5	6	7	8	9	10	Final
Italy (Constantini)	0	1	0	0	0	0	0	X	X	X	1
South Korea (Kim) 🔨	2	0	2	0	1	1	1	X	X	X	7

Sheet D	1	2	3	4	5	6	7	8	9	10	Final
Latvia (Blumberga-Bērziņa)	0	2	1	1	1	0	0	3	0	1	9
Czech Republic (Kubešková) 🔨	2	0	0	0	0	1	1	0	2	0	6

==== Draw 6 ====
Tuesday, December 14, 14:00

Sheet A	1	2	3	4	5	6	7	8	9	10	Final
South Korea (Kim)	2	1	0	0	2	2	0	3	X	X	10
Estonia (Turmann) 🔨	0	0	2	1	0	0	2	0	X	X	5

Sheet B	1	2	3	4	5	6	7	8	9	10	Final
Czech Republic (Kubešková) 🔨	1	0	0	1	0	1	0	3	0	X	6
Italy (Constantini)	0	5	2	0	1	0	2	0	3	X	13

Sheet C	1	2	3	4	5	6	7	8	9	10	Final
Japan (Fujisawa) 🔨	2	1	2	0	2	1	1	X	X	X	9
Latvia (Blumberga-Bērziņa)	0	0	0	1	0	0	0	X	X	X	1

Sheet D	1	2	3	4	5	6	7	8	9	10	Final
Great Britain (Muirhead) 🔨	2	0	0	2	0	1	0	1	0	1	7
Germany (Jentsch)	0	1	0	0	1	0	1	0	1	0	4

==== Draw 7 ====
Wednesday, December 15, 9:00

Sheet A	1	2	3	4	5	6	7	8	9	10	Final
Latvia (Blumberga-Bērziņa) 🔨	1	0	0	1	0	3	0	0	2	0	7
Germany (Jentsch)	0	1	2	0	2	0	1	1	0	1	8

Sheet B	1	2	3	4	5	6	7	8	9	10	Final
South Korea (Kim)	0	0	1	0	2	0	0	0	1	X	4
Japan (Fujisawa) 🔨	3	1	0	1	0	1	1	1	0	X	8

Sheet C	1	2	3	4	5	6	7	8	9	10	Final
Estonia (Turmann) 🔨	0	0	0	0	1	0	1	0	0	X	2
Great Britain (Muirhead)	0	2	0	0	0	2	0	3	2	X	9

Sheet D	1	2	3	4	5	6	7	8	9	10	Final
Italy (Constantini) 🔨	0	2	0	3	0	2	0	2	3	X	12
Turkey (Yıldız)	0	0	2	0	1	0	1	0	0	X	4

==== Draw 8 ====
Wednesday, December 15, 19:00

Sheet A	1	2	3	4	5	6	7	8	9	10	Final
Czech Republic (Kubešková) 🔨	0	0	2	0	1	1	3	0	X	X	7
Turkey (Yıldız)	0	0	0	1	0	0	0	1	X	X	2

Sheet B	1	2	3	4	5	6	7	8	9	10	Final
Latvia (Blumberga-Bērziņa)	0	0	0	2	0	1	0	2	0	X	5
Great Britain (Muirhead) 🔨	0	2	1	0	2	0	1	0	3	X	9

Sheet C	1	2	3	4	5	6	7	8	9	10	11	Final
Germany (Jentsch) 🔨	0	0	1	1	1	0	0	1	0	2	0	6
Italy (Constantini)	1	0	0	0	0	1	2	0	2	0	1	7

Sheet D	1	2	3	4	5	6	7	8	9	10	Final
Japan (Fujisawa) 🔨	0	3	0	1	2	0	3	X	X	X	9
Estonia (Turmann)	0	0	1	0	0	1	0	X	X	X	2

==== Draw 9 ====
Thursday, December 16, 14:00

Sheet A	1	2	3	4	5	6	7	8	9	10	Final
Italy (Constantini) 🔨	0	0	1	0	0	0	X	X	X	X	1
Great Britain (Muirhead)	2	0	0	1	3	2	X	X	X	X	8

Sheet B	1	2	3	4	5	6	7	8	9	10	Final
Estonia (Turmann) 🔨	0	1	0	0	0	0	X	X	X	X	1
Germany (Jentsch)	0	0	1	2	1	3	X	X	X	X	7

Sheet C	1	2	3	4	5	6	7	8	9	10	Final
Turkey (Yıldız)	0	0	0	0	2	0	3	0	0	3	8
Japan (Fujisawa) 🔨	0	0	1	0	0	2	0	1	1	0	5

Sheet D	1	2	3	4	5	6	7	8	9	10	Final
Czech Republic (Kubešková) 🔨	2	0	1	0	1	0	2	0	0	X	6
South Korea (Kim)	0	1	0	2	0	2	0	4	3	X	12

=== Playoffs ===
Three teams, Japan, South Korea and Latvia qualified for the play-offs to decide the final two places at Beijing 2022. The teams finishing second and third, South Korea and Japan, face off in the first Qualifier; the winner qualifies for Beijing. The loser then faces fourth-placed Latvia in the second and final qualifier, with the winner of that match taking the final place in Beijing.

Qualification Game 1
2	South Korea	5
3	Japan	8

Qualification Game 2
2	South Korea	8
4	Latvia	5

Qualified
Japan
South Korea

==== Qualification Game 1 ====
Friday, December 17, 10:00

Sheet B	1	2	3	4	5	6	7	8	9	10	Final
South Korea (Kim)	0	1	0	2	0	0	0	0	2	X	5
Japan (Fujisawa) 🔨	1	0	2	0	2	0	2	1	0	X	8

Player percentages
South Korea		Japan	
Kim Seon-yeong	84%	Yurika Yoshida	74%
Kim Cho-hi	81%	Yumi Suzuki	84%
Kim Kyeong-ae	60%	Chinami Yoshida	78%
Kim Eun-jung	71%	Satsuki Fujisawa	82%
Total	74%	Total	79%

==== Qualification Game 2 ====
Saturday, December 18, 10:00

Sheet B	1	2	3	4	5	6	7	8	9	10	Final
South Korea (Kim) 🔨	0	3	0	1	0	1	0	2	0	1	8
Latvia (Blumberga-Bērziņa)	0	0	1	0	1	0	2	0	1	0	5

Player percentages
South Korea		Latvia	
Kim Seon-yeong	83%	Ieva Krusta	66%
Kim Cho-hi	84%	Ieva Rudzīte	80%
Kim Kyeong-ae	83%	Santa Blumberga-Bērziņa	59%
Kim Eun-jung	84%	Evelīna Barone	76%
Total	83%	Total	70%
