= Joshua Sutor =

German curler (born 1999)

- Curler
- Born: 26 October 1999 (age 27); Füssen, Germany

Team
- Curling club: Baden Hills G&CC, Füssen, GER
- Mixed doubles partner: Pia-Lisa Schöll

Curling career
- Member Association: Germany
- World Championship: 2 (2021, 2022)
- World Mixed Doubles Championship: 1 (2025)
- European Championship: 4 (2019, 2021, 2022, 2023)

Joshua Sutor (born 26 October 1999) is a German curler from Pfronten, Germany.

== Career ==
=== Juniors ===
Sutor played in three World Junior-B Curling Championships during his junior career in 2016, 2018 and 2019. He was the alternate for the Marc Muskatewitz rink in 2016, second for the Klaudius Harsch rink in 2018 and third for Sixten Totzek in 2019. After losing the qualifying game in 2016, his team won the bronze medal game at the 2018 World Junior B Curling Championships, sending them to the 2018 World Junior Curling Championships. At the championship, the team just missed the playoffs with a 4–5 record after losing their final round robin draw to Canada's Tyler Tardi. Their fifth-place finish earned the team a spot at the 2019 World Junior Curling Championships without having to qualify through the B Championship. They did not have a good performance at the 2019 championship, finishing with a 3–6 round robin record and being relegated to the B Championship for the following season. They would, however, qualify again through the 2019 World Junior-B Curling Championships in December 2019 to secure a spot at the 2020 World Junior Curling Championships. There, Sutor would have his best finish to date, qualifying for the playoffs for the first time with a 6–3 record. They then lost to Canada's Jacques Gauthier in the semifinal 7–4 and Scotland's James Craik in the bronze medal game 6–5, settling for fourth place.

=== Mens ===
Sutor competed in his first European Curling Championship in 2019 as second for the German team. There, his team finished with a 3–6 record. The team was set to represent Germany at the 2020 World Men's Curling Championship before the event was cancelled due to the COVID-19 pandemic.

Sutor remained as the German National Team's second for the 2020–21 season. They represented Germany at the 2021 World Men's Curling Championship in Calgary, Alberta where they finished with a 4–9 record. The Totzek rink would again represent Germany at the 2022 World Men's Curling Championship, where they improved their performance after completing the round robin with a 6–6 record, but missing out on the playoffs due to their cumulative last stone draw record compared to other tied teams, finishing 7th. At the end of the season, Sutor announced he would be leaving the team.

After leaving the Totzek team the year prior, Sutor and Totzek would reunite again in the 2023-24 curling season. In their first event of the new season, Team Totzek won the German European Trials in a 3–2 series over Benny Kapp. This earned the team the right to compete in the 2023 European Curling Championships, where they had their best start ever, winning their first three games. They then lost five of their last six games to finish just outside the playoffs with a 4–5 record. Despite qualifying Germany for the 2024 World Men's Curling Championship, Team Kapp won the German Men's Curling Championship and were chosen to represent the country at the World Championships. The Totzek rink would fail to represent Germany in the 2024-25 curling season, losing the final of both the 2024 German European Curling Trials, and the 2025 German Men's Curling Championship to Marc Muskatewitz.

=== Mixed Doubles ===
Sutor began playing mixed doubles curling with Pia-Lisa Schöll in the 2024-25 season, where they represented Germany at the 2025 World Mixed Doubles Curling Championship. At the 2025 Worlds, they would finish with a disappointing 2–7 record, finishing in 14th place.

== Personal life ==
Sutor is a student.

== Awards and honours ==
World Junior Curling Championships – Men's Sportsmanship Award 2019.

== Teams ==
Season	Skip	Third	Second	Lead	Alternate
2015–16	Marc Muskatewitz	Sixten Totzek	Michael Wiest	Sebastian Oswald	Joshua Sutor
2017–18	Sixten Totzek (Fourth)	Klaudius Harsch (Skip)	Joshua Sutor	Jan-Luca Häg	Till Wunderlich
2018–19	Sixten Totzek (Fourth)	Klaudius Harsch (Skip)	Joshua Sutor	Magnus Sutor	Jan-Luca Häg
2019–20	Sixten Totzek	Joshua Sutor	Jan-Luca Häg	Magnus Sutor	Klaudius Harsch
2019–20	Marc Muskatewitz	Sixten Totzek	Joshua Sutor	Dominik Greindl	Benny Kapp
2020–21	Sixten Totzek	Marc Muskatewitz	Joshua Sutor	Dominik Greindl	Klaudius Harsch
2021–22	Sixten Totzek	Marc Muskatewitz	Joshua Sutor	Dominik Greindl	Magnus Sutor
2023–24	Sixten Totzek	Joshua Sutor	Magnus Sutor	Jan-Luca Häg	Benny Kapp
2024–25	Sixten Totzek	Joshua Sutor	Jan-Luca Häg	Magnus Sutor	
