= Sixten Totzek =

German curler (born 2000)

- Curler
- Born: 5 January 2000 (age 26); Baden-Baden, Germany

Team
- Curling club: Baden Hills G&CC, Füssen, GER
- Mixed doubles partner: Vera Tiuliakova

Curling career
- Member Association: Germany
- World Championship: 3 (2021, 2022, 2023)
- World Mixed Doubles Championship: 3 (2024, 2026, 2027)
- European Championship: 5 (2018, 2019, 2021, 2022, 2023)

Sixten Totzek (born 5 January 2000 in Baden-Baden) is a German curler from Rastatt, Germany.

== Career ==
=== Juniors ===
Totzek played in four World Junior-B Curling Championships from 2016 to 2019 as third and fourth for Team Germany. In 2016 and 2017, he played third for Marc Muskatewitz and in 2018 and 2019, he threw fourth stones for Klaudius Harsch. The team lost the qualifying games in 2016 and 2017 before winning the bronze medal game at the 2018 World Junior B Curling Championships, sending them to the 2018 World Junior Curling Championships. At the championship, the team just missed the playoffs with a 4–5 record after losing their final round robin draw to Canada's Tyler Tardi. Their fifth place finish earned the team a spot at the 2019 World Junior Curling Championships without having to qualify through the B Championship. They did not have a good performance at the 2019 championship, finishing with a 3–6 round robin record and being relegated to the B Championship for the following season. They would, however, qualify again through the 2019 World Junior-B Curling Championships in December 2019 to secure a spot at the 2020 World Junior Curling Championships. There, Totzek would have his best finish to date, qualifying for the playoffs for the first time with a 6–3 record. They then lost to Canada's Jacques Gauthier in the semifinal 7–4 and Scotland's James Craik in the bronze medal game 6–5, settling for fourth place.

=== Mens ===
Totzek competed in his first European Curling Championship in 2018 as third for the German team. There, his team qualified for the playoffs as the fourth seed with a 5–4 record. They then lost to Sweden's Niklas Edin 6–3 in the semifinal and Italy's Joël Retornaz 8–6 in the bronze medal game, finishing fourth. Despite not winning a medal, the team did qualify Germany for the 2019 World Men's Curling Championship, which Totzek did not participate in. The next season, the team played in the 2019 European Curling Championships, finishing with a 3–6 record. The team was set to represent Germany at the 2020 World Men's Curling Championship before the event was cancelled due to the COVID-19 pandemic.

For the 2020–21 season, Totzek began skipping the German team. In his first event skipping the team, he led them to a semifinal finish at the Baden Masters. Later, his team represented Germany at the 2021 World Men's Curling Championship in Calgary, Alberta where they finished with a 4–9 record. This was not enough to qualify for an Olympic spot, meaning the team needed to finish in the top three at the Olympic Qualification Event to qualify for the Games.

To begin the 2021–22 season, Team Totzek finished third at the WCT Tallinn Mens Challenger. They also reached the final of the Grand Prix Bern Inter before losing to Switzerland's Yves Stocker. At the 2021 European Curling Championships, the team had mixed results, finishing with a 3–6 record. This landed them in eighth place which was enough to qualify for the 2022 World Men's Curling Championship. Next for the team was the Olympic Qualification Event in Leeuwarden, Netherlands. Despite entering the event as the fifth ranked nation, the German team struggled to catch on to the ice, finishing in last place with a 1–7 record and failing to qualify for the 2022 Winter Olympics. In the new year, however, the team turned things around by winning the Aberdeen International Curling Championship, defeating Italy's Joël Retornaz in the final. At the World Championships, Totzek and teammates Marc Muskatewitz, Joshua Sutor and Dominik Greindl started with a strong 3–1 record before losing their next four games. After winning their next three matches, the team lost their last round robin game to South Korea, finishing in seventh place and just missing the playoffs. After the season, Muskatewitz left the team and was replaced by Klaudius Harsch.

With their new lineup, Team Totzek struggled to find consistency during the 2022–23 season, only qualifying in two of their six tour events. At both the Grand Prix Bern Inter and the St. Galler Elite Challenge, they lost in the quarterfinals. This continued into the 2022 European Curling Championships where they finished with a 3–6 record, again securing the last spot at the 2023 World Men's Curling Championship. There, they finished in ninth place with a 4–8 record. Harsch left the rink following the season with Jan-Luca Häg joining the team at lead, shifting Magnus Sutor to second and Joshua Sutor to third. In their first event of the new season, Team Totzek won the German European Trials in a 3–2 series over Benny Kapp. This earned the team the right to compete in their fifth straight European Championship in 2023 where they had their best start ever, winning their first three games. They then lost five of their last six games to finish just outside the playoffs with a 4–5 record. Despite qualifying Germany for the 2024 World Men's Curling Championship, Team Kapp won the German Men's Curling Championship and were chosen to represent the country at the World Championships. The Totzek rink would fail to represent Germany internationally in the 2024–25 curling season, losing the final of both the 2024 German European Curling Trials, and the 2025 German Men's Curling Championship to former teammate Muskatewitz's rink.

=== Mixed Doubles ===
During the 2023–24 season, Totzek won the German Mixed Doubles Trials with partner Lena Kapp, qualifying for the 2023 World Mixed Doubles Qualification Event. There, the team won all eight of their games, becoming the first qualifiers for the 2024 World Mixed Doubles Curling Championship in Östersund, Sweden. At the championship, the duo had a good 3–1 start before losing three consecutive games, ultimately finishing sixth in their pool with a 4–5 record.

Totzek would win his second German Mixed Doubles Championship during the 2025–26 season with new partner Vera Tiuliakova, earning the right to represent Germany at the 2026 World Mixed Doubles Curling Championship.

== Personal life ==
Totzek is a student.

== Teams ==
Season	Skip	Third	Second	Lead	Alternate
2015–16	Marc Muskatewitz	Sixten Totzek	Michael Wiest	Sebastian Oswald	Joshua Sutor
2016–17	Marc Muskatewitz	Sixten Totzek	Jan-Luca Häg	Marc Weiler	Magnus Sutor
2017–18	Sixten Totzek (Fourth)	Klaudius Harsch (Skip)	Joshua Sutor	Jan-Luca Häg	Till Wunderlich
2018–19	Sixten Totzek (Fourth)	Klaudius Harsch (Skip)	Joshua Sutor	Magnus Sutor	Jan-Luca Häg
2018–19	Marc Muskatewitz	Sixten Totzek	Daniel Neuner	Ryan Sherrard	Sebastien Schweizer
2019–20	Sixten Totzek	Joshua Sutor	Jan-Luca Häg	Magnus Sutor	Klaudius Harsch
2019–20	Marc Muskatewitz	Sixten Totzek	Joshua Sutor	Dominik Greindl	Benny Kapp
2020–21	Sixten Totzek	Marc Muskatewitz	Joshua Sutor	Dominik Greindl	Klaudius Harsch
2021–22	Sixten Totzek	Marc Muskatewitz	Joshua Sutor	Dominik Greindl	Magnus Sutor
2022–23	Sixten Totzek	Klaudius Harsch	Magnus Sutor	Dominik Greindl	Marc Muskatewitz
2023–24	Sixten Totzek	Joshua Sutor	Magnus Sutor	Jan-Luca Häg	Benny Kapp
2024–25	Sixten Totzek	Joshua Sutor	Jan-Luca Häg	Magnus Sutor	
