= Dominik Greindl =

German curler (born 1988)

- Curler
- Born: 27 July 1988 (age 38); Augsburg, Germany

Team
- Curling club: SC Riessersee, Garmisch-Partenkirchen

Curling career
- Member Association: Germany
- World Championship: 4 (2019, 2021, 2022, 2023)
- European Championship: 3 (2019, 2021, 2022)
- Other appearances: World Junior Championships: 2 (2007, 2008), European Junior Challenge: 1 (2007)
Medal record
Curling
German Men's Championship
Silver medal – second place	2014 Hamburg
European Junior Challenge
Gold medal – first place	2007 Tårnby

Dominik Greindl (born 27 July 1988 in Augsburg) is a German curler from Munich.

== Personal life ==
Greindl works as a senior manager for PricewaterhouseCoopers.

== Teams ==
Season	Skip	Third	Second	Lead	Alternate	Coach	Events
2006–07	Daniel Neuner	Florian Zahler	Johannes Glaser	Dominik Greindl	Gabor Dénes (WJCC)	Rainer Schöpp	EJCC 2007 (gold); WJCC 2007 (8th)
2007–08	Daniel Neuner	Florian Zahler	Johannes Glaser	Dominik Greindl	George Geiger	Rainer Schöpp	WJCC 2008 (6th)
2008–09	Daniel Neuner	Florian Zahler	Dominik Greindl	Laynes Lauterbach	George Geiger		
2009–10	Daniel Neuner	Florian Zahler	Dominik Greindl	Laynes Lauterbach	George Geiger		
2010–11	Daniel Neuner	Florian Zahler	Dominik Greindl	Laynes Lauterbach			
2012–13	Konstantin Kampf	Sebastian Jacoby	Alexander Kampf	Dominik Greindl			GMCC 2013 (4th)
2013–14	Konstantin Kampf	Daniel Neuner	Alexander Kampf	Dominik Greindl	Sebastian Jacoby		GMCC 2014 (silver)
2014–15	Daniel Neuner (fourth)	Konstantin Kampf (skip)	Alexander Kampf	Dominik Greindl	Sebastian Jacoby		
2018–19	Marc Muskatewitz	Daniel Neuner	Ryan Sherrard	Dominik Greindl	Benjamin Kapp	Andy Kapp	WCC 2019 (8th)
2019–20	Marc Muskatewitz	Sixten Totzek	Joshua Sutor	Dominik Greindl	Benjamin Kapp	Uli Kapp, Lukas Fritsch	ECC 2019 (7th)
2020–21	Sixten Totzek	Marc Muskatewitz	Joshua Sutor	Dominik Greindl	Klaudius Harsch	Uli Kapp	WCC 2021 (10th)
2021–22	Sixten Totzek	Marc Muskatewitz	Joshua Sutor	Dominik Greindl	Magnus Sutor	Uli Kapp, Holger Höhne	ECC 2021 (8th); WCC 2022 (7th)
2022–23	Sixten Totzek	Klaudius Harsch	Magnus Sutor	Dominik Greindl	Joshua Sutor	Daniel Herberg, Uli Kapp	ECC 2022 (8th)
2022–23	Sixten Totzek	Klaudius Harsch	Magnus Sutor	Dominik Greindl	Marc Muskatewitz	Uli Kapp	WCC 2023 (9th)
