= Magnus Sutor =

German curler (born 2001)

- Curler
- Born: 25 March 2001 (age 25); Füssen

Curling career
- Member Association: Germany
- World Championship: 1 (2023)
- European Championship: 3 (2021, 2022, 2023)
Medal record
Men's curling
Representing Germany
World Junior Championships
Silver medal – second place	2022 Jönköping

Magnus Sutor (born 25 March 2001) is a German curler, originally from Füssen, Bavaria.

== Career ==
=== Juniors ===
Sutor's first international curling experience came at the 2017 World Junior B Curling Championships, as the German team's alternate. The team would not qualify for the 2017 World Junior Curling Championships, as they lost in the bronze medal game.

Sutor played lead for the German junior team at the 2019, 2020 and 2022 World Junior Curling Championships.

At the 2019 World Juniors, the team finished the event with a 3–6 record, relegating them to the following year's B event. There, the team, now skipped by Sixten Totzek, won the bronze medal, qualifying the team to play in the 2020 World Juniors. At the World Juniors, the Totzek-led team finished the round robin with a 6–3 record, qualifying for the playoffs. In the playoffs, the team lost both the semifinal to Canada and the bronze medal to Scotland, settling for fourth place.

The COVID-19 pandemic cancelled the 2021 World Juniors, but Sutor was back representing Germany at the 2022 World Juniors, on a team skipped by Benjamin Kapp. The event, was delayed until May that year due to the pandemic, which was held months after the curling season was over, preventing the team from playing competitively during the time. After finishing the round robin with a 7–2 record, the team defeated Canada in the semifinal, but lost in the final to Scotland, settling for a silver medal.

=== Men's ===
Sutor's first international men's event was as the German team's alternate at the 2021 European Curling Championships. The team, skipped by Totzek finished with a 3–6 record. The team also played in the Qualification event for the 2022 Olympics, but finished last with a 1–7 record. Sutor played in three games at the event as the alternate.

Sutor was excluded from the German team at the 2022 World Men's Curling Championship, but was added as the team's second for the 2022 European Curling Championships. There, they finished with a 3–6 record, qualifying for the 2023 World Men's Curling Championship. At the Europeans, Sutor injured himself, and missed two games.

== Personal life ==
Sutor currently lives in Munich and is a student.
