= 2021 World Men's Curling Championship =

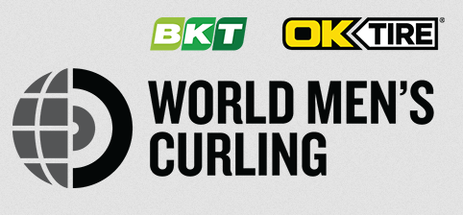
- Host city: Calgary, Canada
- Arena: Markin MacPhail Centre
- Dates: April 2–11, 2021
- Winner: Sweden
- Curling club: Karlstads CK, Karlstad
- Skip: Niklas Edin
- Third: Oskar Eriksson
- Second: Rasmus Wranå
- Lead: Christoffer Sundgren
- Alternate: Daniel Magnusson
- Coach: Fredrik Lindberg
- Finalist: Scotland (Mouat)

The 2021 World Men's Curling Championship (branded as the 2021 BKT Tires & OK Tire World Men's Curling Championship for sponsorship reasons) was held from April 2 to 11 at the Markin MacPhail Centre at Canada Olympic Park in Calgary, Canada. The event was originally to be held in Ottawa, but due to the COVID-19 pandemic, the championship was moved to Calgary. The event was scheduled to be held in a bio-secure bubble at Canada Olympic Park, which also hosted all major Curling Canada championships leading up to the Worlds (including the 2021 Tim Hortons Brier, which determined Canada's entrant). All events were held behind closed doors with no spectators.

The 2021 championship fielded the largest number of teams in the history of the event, with fourteen total. Niklas Edin, skip of Team Sweden, and his third, Oskar Eriksson, won a record fifth career World Championship. The team, which also consisted of Rasmus Wranå and Christoffer Sundgren, won a record third straight championship. They defeated Team Scotland, skipped by Bruce Mouat in the final, 10–5. With the game tied at 5 in the ninth end, Edin made a double takeout with the last rock of the end to score five. Down by 5 with just one end to go, Team Scotland then conceded the game. Switzerland, skipped by Peter de Cruz, won the bronze medal.

The championship served as one of two qualification events for curling at the 2022 Winter Olympics in Beijing. The National Olympic Committees representing the top six finishers at the tournament qualified directly for the Olympic tournament. In order of ranking, this included Sweden, Great Britain, Switzerland, the ROC, the United States, and Canada. The remaining teams that had qualified for the 2020 or 2021 World Championships competed in the World Curling Federation's Olympic Qualification Event in December 2021 for the remaining three spots.

== Impact of the COVID-19 pandemic ==
On April 9, the World Curling Federation announced that a positive COVID-19 test had been recorded by a player on a non-playoff team, and that the second qualification match between the United States and Switzerland would therefore be postponed. The World Curling Federation postponed all games scheduled for April 10 due to additional positive tests involving a member of a playoff team. There were three initial positives from players on non-playoff teams who were tested as part of the exit protocols, and four close contacts were also identified.

On April 11, following approval by Alberta Health Services (AHS), the World Curling Federation announced that play would resume, with all remaining games being played throughout the day. One playoff team member who had been fully vaccinated initially tested positive, but later tested negative and was cleared to participate in the playoffs. Enhanced biosecurity protocols were mandated for the remainder of the tournament, including additional tests before and after each game, and requiring masks to be worn on-ice. Canadian broadcaster TSN pulled its camera crew for the U.S./Switzerland match, and announced that the game would not be televised due to unspecified "COVID-19 issues"; the game was still broadcast via the WCF host feed.

On April 12, all four tests were deemed false positives following an extensive review by health authorities. Team USA third Christopher Plys announced on Twitter that he was the playoff-bound curler who had tested positive.

== Qualification ==
The following nations qualified to participate in the 2021 World Men's Curling Championship:

Pursuant to a December 2020 ruling by the Court of Arbitration for Sport, Russia is prohibited from competing under its flag or any national symbols at any Olympic Games or world championships through December 16, 2022, and must compete neutrally. The World Curling Federation listed the Russian team as the abbreviation "RCF", for the Russian Curling Federation.

Means of qualification	Vacancies	Qualified
Host Nation	1	Canada
Americas	1	United States
Europe	8	Sweden; Switzerland; Scotland; Denmark; Italy; Norway; Germany; Netherlands
Pacific-Asia	2	South Korea; Japan
World Rankings	1	RCF
2020 World Qualification Event	1	China
TOTAL	14	

=== World Ranking ===
The World Curling Federation World Ranking tracks and lists the success of all Member Associations.

Member Associations	Rank	Points
Sweden	1	89.020
Canada	2	75.980
United States	3	71.029
Switzerland	4	65.196
Scotland	5	52.059
Japan	6	44.118
Norway	7	40.392
South Korea	8	35.343
Italy	9	34.461
Denmark	10	24.520
RCF	11	19.412
Germany	12	18.578
China	13	18.358
Netherlands	14	16.951

== Teams ==
The teams are as follows:

Canada	China	Denmark	Germany	Italy
Saville Community SC, Edmonton Skip: Brendan Bottcher; Third: Darren Moulding; Second: Brad Thiessen; Lead: Karrick Martin; Alternate: Marc Kennedy	Harbin CC, Harbin Skip: Zou Qiang; Third: Tian Jiafeng; Second: Wang Zhiyu; Lead: Xu Jingtao; Alternate: Han Peng	Gentofte CC, Gentofte & Hvidovre CC, Hvidovre Fourth: Mikkel Krause; Third: Tobias Thune; Skip: Mads Nørgård; Lead: Kasper Wiksten; Alternate: Oliver Rosenkrands Søe	Baden Hills G&CC, Füssen Skip: Sixten Totzek; Third: Marc Muskatewitz; Second: Joshua Sutor; Lead: Dominik Greindl; Alternate: Klaudius Harsch	Torino-Pinerolo CC, Pinerolo & Aeronautica Militare Skip: Joël Retornaz; Third: Amos Mosaner; Second: Sebastiano Arman; Lead: Mattia Giovanella; Alternate: Fabio Ribotta
Japan	Netherlands	Norway	RCF	Scotland
Tokoro CC, Tokoro Skip: Yuta Matsumura; Third: Tetsuro Shimizu; Second: Yasumasa Tanida; Lead: Shinya Abe; Alternate: Kosuke Aita	CC PWA Zoetermeer, Zoetermeer Fourth: Wouter Gösgens; Skip: Jaap van Dorp; Second: Laurens Hoekman; Lead: Carlo Glasbergen; Alternate: Tobias van den Hurk	Oppdal CC, Oppdal Skip: Steffen Walstad; Third: Torger Nergård; Second: Markus Høiberg; Lead: Magnus Vågberg; Alternate: Eirik Mjøen	Adamant CC, Saint Petersburg Skip: Sergey Glukhov; Third: Evgeny Klimov; Second: Dmitry Mironov; Lead: Anton Kalalb; Alternate: Daniil Goriachev	Gogar Park CC, Edinburgh Skip: Bruce Mouat; Third: Grant Hardie; Second: Bobby Lammie; Lead: Hammy McMillan Jr. Alternate: Ross Whyte
South Korea	Sweden	Switzerland	United States	
Uijeongbu CC, Uijeongbu Skip: Jeong Yeong-seok; Third: Kim Jeong-min (Note: Team South Korea made a lineup change after Draw 6. Second Kim Jeong-min moved to third and third Park Se-won moved to second. They kept this lineup for the remainder of the tournament.); Second: Park Se-won; Lead: Lee Jun-hyung; Alternate: Seo Min-guk	Karlstads CK, Karlstad Skip: Niklas Edin; Third: Oskar Eriksson; Second: Rasmus Wranå; Lead: Christoffer Sundgren; Alternate: Daniel Magnusson	CC Genève, Geneva & Interlaken CC, Interlaken Fourth: Benoît Schwarz; Third: Sven Michel; Skip: Peter de Cruz; Lead: Valentin Tanner; Alternate: Pablo Lachat	Duluth CC, Duluth Skip: John Shuster; Third: Chris Plys; Second: Matt Hamilton; Lead: John Landsteiner; Alternate: Colin Hufman	

=== WCF ranking ===
Year to date World Curling Federation order of merit ranking for each team prior to the event. Rankings based on the 2019–20 season.

Nation (Skip)	Rank	Points
Canada (Bottcher)	4	347.979
Scotland (Mouat)	5	343.005
Sweden (Edin)	8	304.836
Switzerland (de Cruz)	9	289.136
Japan (Matsumura)	16	202.961
United States (Shuster)	19	181.864
Netherlands (van Dorp)	28	133.398
Italy (Retornaz)	30	130.346
Norway (Walstad)	32	129.878
China (Zou)	42	106.111
RCF (Glukhov)	44	102.341
Germany (Totzek)	88	52.322
Denmark (Nørgård)	122	33.972
South Korea (Jeong)	275	7.268

== Round-robin standings ==
Final round-robin standings

Key
Teams to Playoffs

Country	Skip	W	L	W–L	PF	PA	EW	EL	BE	SE	S%	DSC
Sweden	Niklas Edin	11	2	1–0	102	63	59	48	8	13	89%	21.83
RCF	Sergey Glukhov	11	2	0–1	103	73	60	47	3	18	83%	24.41
United States	John Shuster	10	3	–	93	75	55	50	5	11	84%	33.89
Canada	Brendan Bottcher	9	4	1–0	96	75	55	49	12	17	86%	21.02
Scotland	Bruce Mouat	9	4	0–1	95	68	56	48	8	15	87%	19.36
Switzerland	Peter de Cruz	8	5	–	90	72	57	51	6	12	85%	18.25
Italy	Joël Retornaz	7	6	1–0	78	64	46	46	13	13	84%	32.15
Norway	Steffen Walstad	7	6	0–1	91	77	59	50	10	13	82%	25.43
Japan	Yuta Matsumura	6	7	–	74	85	45	54	5	8	83%	36.91
Germany	Sixten Totzek	4	9	–	81	92	50	58	6	11	80%	53.87
Denmark	Mads Nørgård	3	10	–	69	95	44	56	6	9	77%	59.96
Netherlands	Jaap van Dorp	2	11	1–1	66	99	47	53	2	9	81%	33.15
South Korea	Jeong Yeong-seok	2	11	1–1	53	110	39	55	8	4	78%	33.75
China	Zou Qiang	2	11	1–1	58	96	47	56	4	7	80%	42.55

Round Robin Summary Table
Pos.	Country	Canada	China	Denmark	Germany	Italy	Japan	Netherlands	Norway		Scotland	South Korea	Sweden	Switzerland	United States	Record
4	Canada	—N/a	6–5	7–5	9–6	7–4	8–5	7–6	6–4	7–8	9–6	9–10	7–9	4–6	10–1	9–4
14	China	5–6	—	6–5	4–8	4–7	6–7	2–10	5–9	6–10	1–10	8–5	3–5	4–9	4–5	2–11
11	Denmark	5–7	5–6	—	6–8	4–10	6–10	14–5	6–7	4–7	2–7	4–3	1–9	9–8	3–8	3–10
10	Germany	6–9	8–4	8–6	—	3–9	5–8	5–7	8–6	4–6	8–9	12–5	4–8	5–8	5–7	4–9
7	Italy	4–7	7–4	10–4	9–3	—	2–5	8–4	10–3	7–8	2–7	7–1	6–7	4–3	2–8	7–6
9	Japan	5–8	7–6	10–6	8–5	5–2	—	7–5	2–10	5–10	3–6	10–7	2–7	5–8	5–10	6–7
12	Netherlands	6–7	10–2	5–14	7–5	4–8	5–7	—	4–7	5–8	4–9	4–5	4–10	4–8	4–9	2–11
8	Norway	4–6	9–5	7–6	6–8	3–10	10–2	7–4	—	6–8	6–7	9–2	9–8	10–5	5–6	7–6
2	RCF	8–7	10–6	7–4	6–4	8–7	10–5	8–5	8–6	—	9–2	9–3	7–8	2–8	11–8	11–2
5	Scotland	6–9	10–1	7–2	9–8	7–2	6–3	9–4	7–6	2–9	—	11–4	5–6	7–4	9–10	9–4
13	South Korea	10–9	5–8	3–4	5–12	1–7	7–10	5–4	2–9	3–9	4–11	—	2–10	3–9	3–8	2–11
1	Sweden	9–7	5–3	9–1	8–4	7–6	7–2	10–4	8–9	8–7	6–5	10–2	—	7–8	8–5	11–2
6	Switzerland	6–4	9–4	8–9	8–5	3–4	8–5	8–4	5–10	8–2	4–7	9–3	8–7	—	6–8	8–5
3	United States	1–10	5–4	8–3	7–5	8–2	10–5	9–4	6–5	8–11	10–9	8–3	5–8	8–6	—	10–3

== Round-robin results ==
All times listed in Mountain Daylight Time (UTC−06:00).

=== Draw 1 ===
Friday, April 2, 9:00 am

Sheet A	1	2	3	4	5	6	7	8	9	10	Final
RCF (Glukhov) 🔨	0	1	1	0	2	3	0	1	0	X	8
Netherlands (van Dorp)	0	0	0	2	0	0	2	0	1	X	5

Sheet B	1	2	3	4	5	6	7	8	9	10	Final
South Korea (Jeong)	0	0	0	0	1	0	0	0	X	X	1
Italy (Retornaz) 🔨	0	3	2	0	0	0	1	1	X	X	7

Sheet C	1	2	3	4	5	6	7	8	9	10	11	Final
Norway (Walstad) 🔨	0	2	0	2	0	1	0	1	0	0	1	7
Denmark (Nørgård)	0	0	2	0	1	0	0	0	2	1	0	6

Sheet D	1	2	3	4	5	6	7	8	9	10	Final
Scotland (Mouat) 🔨	0	2	0	0	3	0	0	1	0	0	6
Canada (Bottcher)	1	0	0	1	0	2	2	0	2	1	9

=== Draw 2 ===
Friday, April 2, 2:00 pm

Sheet A	1	2	3	4	5	6	7	8	9	10	Final
Germany (Totzek)	0	1	0	0	2	1	0	0	1	X	5
Japan (Matsumura) 🔨	4	0	0	1	0	0	2	1	0	X	8

Sheet B	1	2	3	4	5	6	7	8	9	10	Final
China (Zou)	0	0	0	0	0	1	1	1	0	1	4
United States (Shuster) 🔨	0	0	3	0	1	0	0	0	1	0	5

Sheet C	1	2	3	4	5	6	7	8	9	10	11	Final
Sweden (Edin)	0	2	0	0	0	1	0	2	0	2	0	7
Switzerland (de Cruz) 🔨	2	0	1	1	0	0	1	0	2	0	1	8

Sheet D	1	2	3	4	5	6	7	8	9	10	Final
South Korea (Jeong)	0	0	2	0	0	0	1	X	X	X	3
RCF (Glukhov) 🔨	2	1	0	3	2	1	0	X	X	X	9

=== Draw 3 ===
Friday, April 2, 7:00 pm

Sheet A	1	2	3	4	5	6	7	8	9	10	Final
Denmark (Nørgård)	0	0	1	1	0	0	0	X	X	X	2
Scotland (Mouat) 🔨	1	1	0	0	4	0	1	X	X	X	7

Sheet B	1	2	3	4	5	6	7	8	9	10	Final
Japan (Matsumura)	0	0	0	2	0	0	2	0	1	X	5
Canada (Bottcher) 🔨	0	0	2	0	0	4	0	2	0	X	8

Sheet C	1	2	3	4	5	6	7	8	9	10	Final
China (Zou)	0	1	0	0	0	1	1	0	1	X	4
Italy (Retornaz) 🔨	2	0	2	1	0	0	0	2	0	X	7

Sheet D	1	2	3	4	5	6	7	8	9	10	Final
Netherlands (van Dorp)	0	0	1	1	0	0	1	0	1	0	4
Norway (Walstad) 🔨	0	2	0	0	0	1	0	3	0	1	7

=== Draw 4 ===
Saturday, April 3, 9:00 am

Sheet A	1	2	3	4	5	6	7	8	9	10	Final
United States (Shuster)	0	2	0	0	1	0	1	0	1	0	5
Sweden (Edin) 🔨	1	0	2	1	0	2	0	1	0	1	8

Sheet B	1	2	3	4	5	6	7	8	9	10	Final
Switzerland (de Cruz) 🔨	2	0	1	2	0	2	0	1	0	X	8
Germany (Totzek)	0	1	0	0	1	0	2	0	1	X	5

Sheet C	1	2	3	4	5	6	7	8	9	10	Final
Scotland (Mouat)	1	0	2	0	0	2	0	4	X	X	9
Netherlands (van Dorp) 🔨	0	1	0	1	0	0	2	0	X	X	4

Sheet D	1	2	3	4	5	6	7	8	9	10	Final
Canada (Bottcher)	0	2	0	2	2	0	1	0	0	X	7
Denmark (Nørgård) 🔨	1	0	1	0	0	0	0	2	1	X	5

=== Draw 5 ===
Saturday, April 3, 2:00 pm

Sheet A	1	2	3	4	5	6	7	8	9	10	Final
China (Zou)	0	2	0	1	0	2	0	1	0	X	6
RCF (Glukhov) 🔨	1	0	2	0	3	0	2	0	2	X	10

Sheet B	1	2	3	4	5	6	7	8	9	10	Final
Norway (Walstad) 🔨	4	0	0	1	0	2	2	X	X	X	9
South Korea (Jeong)	0	1	0	0	1	0	0	X	X	X	2

Sheet C	1	2	3	4	5	6	7	8	9	10	Final
Germany (Totzek) 🔨	0	1	0	0	2	0	0	0	2	0	5
United States (Shuster)	1	0	1	0	0	0	3	1	0	1	7

Sheet D	1	2	3	4	5	6	7	8	9	10	11	Final
Italy (Retornaz)	1	1	0	0	0	1	0	2	0	1	0	6
Sweden (Edin) 🔨	0	0	0	3	0	0	2	0	1	0	1	7

=== Draw 6 ===
Saturday, April 3, 7:00 pm

Sheet A	1	2	3	4	5	6	7	8	9	10	Final
Japan (Matsumura)	1	0	2	0	1	0	0	1	0	X	5
Switzerland (de Cruz) 🔨	0	2	0	1	0	2	1	0	2	X	8

Sheet B	1	2	3	4	5	6	7	8	9	10	Final
Netherlands (van Dorp) 🔨	2	0	2	0	0	1	0	X	X	X	5
Denmark (Nørgård)	0	4	0	5	1	0	4	X	X	X	14

Sheet C	1	2	3	4	5	6	7	8	9	10	Final
Norway (Walstad) 🔨	2	0	2	0	1	0	1	0	2	1	9
China (Zou)	0	2	0	1	0	1	0	1	0	0	5

Sheet D	1	2	3	4	5	6	7	8	9	10	Final
Scotland (Mouat)	0	3	0	3	0	0	0	5	X	X	11
South Korea (Jeong) 🔨	2	0	1	0	1	0	0	0	X	X	4

=== Draw 7 ===
Sunday, April 4, 9:00 am

Sheet A	1	2	3	4	5	6	7	8	9	10	Final
Italy (Retornaz) 🔨	0	0	3	1	3	0	2	X	X	X	9
Germany (Totzek)	0	1	0	0	0	2	0	X	X	X	3

Sheet B	1	2	3	4	5	6	7	8	9	10	11	Final
Canada (Bottcher) 🔨	0	0	0	1	0	0	2	0	1	0	0	4
Switzerland (de Cruz)	0	1	1	0	0	1	0	0	0	1	2	6

Sheet C	1	2	3	4	5	6	7	8	9	10	11	Final
RCF (Glukhov) 🔨	0	1	0	2	0	1	0	1	0	2	0	7
Sweden (Edin)	0	0	2	0	2	0	1	0	2	0	1	8

Sheet D	1	2	3	4	5	6	7	8	9	10	Final
United States (Shuster) 🔨	1	0	3	0	1	0	2	0	3	X	10
Japan (Matsumura)	0	1	0	1	0	1	0	2	0	X	5

=== Draw 8 ===
Sunday, April 4, 2:00 pm

Sheet A	1	2	3	4	5	6	7	8	9	10	Final
Netherlands (van Dorp)	0	0	2	0	0	1	0	0	2	1	6
Canada (Bottcher) 🔨	0	2	0	2	0	0	2	1	0	0	7

Sheet B	1	2	3	4	5	6	7	8	9	10	Final
Scotland (Mouat)	0	4	1	1	0	1	3	X	X	X	10
China (Zou) 🔨	0	0	0	0	1	0	0	X	X	X	1

Sheet C	1	2	3	4	5	6	7	8	9	10	Final
Denmark (Nørgård)	0	0	0	1	0	1	0	1	0	1	4
South Korea (Jeong) 🔨	0	1	0	0	2	0	0	0	0	0	3

Sheet D	1	2	3	4	5	6	7	8	9	10	Final
Sweden (Edin) 🔨	0	2	0	0	2	1	0	3	0	0	8
Norway (Walstad)	0	0	2	2	0	0	2	0	0	3	9

=== Draw 9 ===
Sunday, April 4, 7:00 pm

Sheet A	1	2	3	4	5	6	7	8	9	10	Final
Switzerland (de Cruz) 🔨	1	0	1	0	0	0	2	0	2	0	6
United States (Shuster)	0	1	0	3	1	0	0	2	0	1	8

Sheet B	1	2	3	4	5	6	7	8	9	10	Final
Netherlands (van Dorp)	0	0	0	1	0	0	1	0	2	0	4
South Korea (Jeong) 🔨	0	0	1	0	0	1	0	2	0	1	5

Sheet C	1	2	3	4	5	6	7	8	9	10	Final
Italy (Retornaz)	0	0	0	0	0	2	0	0	0	X	2
Japan (Matsumura) 🔨	0	1	0	2	0	0	0	1	1	X	5

Sheet D	1	2	3	4	5	6	7	8	9	10	Final
RCF (Glukhov)	0	1	0	0	0	1	0	0	3	1	6
Germany (Totzek) 🔨	1	0	0	0	0	0	2	1	0	0	4

=== Draw 10 ===
Monday, April 5, 9:00 am

Sheet A	1	2	3	4	5	6	7	8	9	10	11	Final
Sweden (Edin)	0	1	0	1	0	0	2	1	0	0	1	6
Scotland (Mouat) 🔨	0	0	1	0	0	1	0	0	2	1	0	5

Sheet B	1	2	3	4	5	6	7	8	9	10	Final
RCF (Glukhov) 🔨	2	0	2	1	0	2	0	3	X	X	10
Japan (Matsumura)	0	1	0	0	3	0	1	0	X	X	5

Sheet C	1	2	3	4	5	6	7	8	9	10	Final
United States (Shuster)	0	0	0	0	0	1	X	X	X	X	1
Canada (Bottcher) 🔨	0	3	1	1	5	0	X	X	X	X	10

Sheet D	1	2	3	4	5	6	7	8	9	10	Final
Denmark (Nørgård)	0	1	0	2	0	0	1	0	1	0	5
China (Zou) 🔨	2	0	1	0	0	1	0	1	0	1	6

=== Draw 11 ===
Monday, April 5, 2:00 pm

Sheet A	1	2	3	4	5	6	7	8	9	10	Final
South Korea (Jeong) 🔨	3	0	1	2	0	1	1	0	0	2	10
Canada (Bottcher)	0	1	0	0	2	0	0	4	2	0	9

Sheet B	1	2	3	4	5	6	7	8	9	10	Final
Germany (Totzek) 🔨	1	0	0	0	3	0	2	0	2	0	8
Norway (Walstad)	0	1	0	1	0	1	0	1	0	2	6

Sheet C	1	2	3	4	5	6	7	8	9	10	Final
China (Zou)	0	0	1	0	0	1	0	X	X	X	2
Netherlands (van Dorp) 🔨	3	2	0	2	1	0	2	X	X	X	10

Sheet D	1	2	3	4	5	6	7	8	9	10	Final
Switzerland (de Cruz)	0	0	0	1	0	0	1	0	1	0	3
Italy (Retornaz) 🔨	0	0	1	0	0	1	0	1	0	1	4

=== Draw 12 ===
Monday, April 5, 7:00 pm

Sheet A	1	2	3	4	5	6	7	8	9	10	Final
United States (Shuster) 🔨	2	1	1	0	1	0	3	X	X	X	8
Italy (Retornaz)	0	0	0	1	0	1	0	X	X	X	2

Sheet B	1	2	3	4	5	6	7	8	9	10	Final
Denmark (Nørgård)	0	0	0	1	0	0	X	X	X	X	1
Sweden (Edin) 🔨	2	1	1	0	4	1	X	X	X	X	9

Sheet C	1	2	3	4	5	6	7	8	9	10	Final
Switzerland (de Cruz) 🔨	3	1	0	1	0	0	3	X	X	X	8
RCF (Glukhov)	0	0	1	0	1	0	0	X	X	X	2

Sheet D	1	2	3	4	5	6	7	8	9	10	Final
Germany (Totzek) 🔨	2	0	3	0	1	0	1	0	1	0	8
Scotland (Mouat)	0	1	0	1	0	3	0	2	0	2	9

=== Draw 13 ===
Tuesday, April 6, 9:00 am

Sheet A	1	2	3	4	5	6	7	8	9	10	Final
Sweden (Edin) 🔨	0	3	0	2	0	2	0	3	X	X	10
Netherlands (van Dorp)	0	0	2	0	1	0	1	0	X	X	4

Sheet B	1	2	3	4	5	6	7	8	9	10	Final
South Korea (Jeong)	0	0	2	0	2	0	0	1	0	X	5
China (Zou) 🔨	2	1	0	1	0	2	0	0	2	X	8

Sheet C	1	2	3	4	5	6	7	8	9	10	Final
Japan (Matsumura)	0	0	0	0	2	0	X	X	X	X	2
Norway (Walstad) 🔨	2	1	1	2	0	4	X	X	X	X	10

Sheet D	1	2	3	4	5	6	7	8	9	10	Final
RCF (Glukhov) 🔨	2	3	0	1	0	0	0	4	0	1	11
United States (Shuster)	0	0	2	0	2	1	1	0	2	0	8

=== Draw 14 ===
Tuesday, April 6, 2:00 pm

Sheet A	1	2	3	4	5	6	7	8	9	10	Final
Germany (Totzek)	0	0	1	3	1	0	1	1	0	1	8
Denmark (Nørgård) 🔨	0	4	0	0	0	2	0	0	0	0	6

Sheet B	1	2	3	4	5	6	7	8	9	10	Final
Japan (Matsumura)	0	0	1	0	0	2	0	0	0	X	3
Scotland (Mouat) 🔨	2	1	0	0	1	0	0	1	1	X	6

Sheet C	1	2	3	4	5	6	7	8	9	10	Final
Canada (Bottcher) 🔨	0	0	1	0	2	3	0	1	0	X	7
Italy (Retornaz)	0	1	0	2	0	0	1	0	0	X	4

Sheet D	1	2	3	4	5	6	7	8	9	10	Final
Norway (Walstad) 🔨	1	0	2	0	1	0	2	3	1	X	10
Switzerland (de Cruz)	0	2	0	2	0	1	0	0	0	X	5

=== Draw 15 ===
Tuesday, April 6, 7:00 pm

Sheet A	1	2	3	4	5	6	7	8	9	10	Final
Canada (Bottcher) 🔨	1	0	0	3	0	0	0	1	0	1	6
China (Zou)	0	1	1	0	1	0	0	0	2	0	5

Sheet B	1	2	3	4	5	6	7	8	9	10	Final
Italy (Retornaz) 🔨	0	0	2	1	0	2	0	0	2	X	7
RCF (Glukhov)	0	1	0	0	4	0	2	1	0	X	8

Sheet C	1	2	3	4	5	6	7	8	9	10	Final
Switzerland (de Cruz) 🔨	1	0	1	0	1	0	1	0	0	X	4
Scotland (Mouat)	0	2	0	1	0	1	0	2	1	X	7

Sheet D	1	2	3	4	5	6	7	8	9	10	Final
Sweden (Edin) 🔨	2	0	2	0	1	3	2	X	X	X	10
South Korea (Jeong)	0	1	0	1	0	0	0	X	X	X	2

=== Draw 16 ===
Wednesday, April 7, 9:00 am

Sheet A	1	2	3	4	5	6	7	8	9	10	11	Final
Norway (Walstad)	0	1	0	2	0	0	1	0	0	1	0	5
United States (Shuster) 🔨	1	0	2	0	1	0	0	1	0	0	1	6

Sheet B	1	2	3	4	5	6	7	8	9	10	Final
Sweden (Edin)	1	0	0	1	0	0	0	2	0	1	5
China (Zou) 🔨	0	1	0	0	1	0	0	0	1	0	3

Sheet C	1	2	3	4	5	6	7	8	9	10	Final
Japan (Matsumura) 🔨	2	0	2	0	3	0	2	0	1	X	10
Denmark (Nørgård)	0	1	0	1	0	2	0	2	0	X	6

Sheet D	1	2	3	4	5	6	7	8	9	10	Final
Germany (Totzek)	0	1	1	0	0	1	0	2	0	0	5
Netherlands (van Dorp) 🔨	1	0	0	1	2	0	1	0	1	1	7

=== Draw 17 ===
Wednesday, April 7, 2:00 pm

Sheet A	1	2	3	4	5	6	7	8	9	10	Final
Japan (Matsumura)	1	0	0	1	2	2	0	1	0	X	7
Netherlands (van Dorp) 🔨	0	2	0	0	0	0	2	0	1	X	5

Sheet B	1	2	3	4	5	6	7	8	9	10	11	Final
Scotland (Mouat) 🔨	2	1	0	1	0	2	0	1	0	2	0	9
United States (Shuster)	0	0	2	0	2	0	2	0	3	0	1	10

Sheet C	1	2	3	4	5	6	7	8	9	10	Final
Italy (Retornaz)	1	0	2	0	5	0	1	1	X	X	10
Norway (Walstad) 🔨	0	1	0	1	0	1	0	0	X	X	3

Sheet D	1	2	3	4	5	6	7	8	9	10	11	Final
Canada (Bottcher) 🔨	0	1	0	2	0	0	1	0	0	3	0	7
RCF (Glukhov)	0	0	1	0	1	1	0	2	2	0	1	8

=== Draw 18 ===
Wednesday, April 7, 7:00 pm

Sheet A	1	2	3	4	5	6	7	8	9	10	Final
Canada (Bottcher)	1	1	0	2	1	0	1	0	1	0	7
Sweden (Edin) 🔨	0	0	1	0	0	1	0	3	0	4	9

Sheet B	1	2	3	4	5	6	7	8	9	10	Final
Denmark (Nørgård) 🔨	1	0	1	0	0	2	0	3	0	2	9
Switzerland (de Cruz)	0	2	0	2	1	0	2	0	1	0	8

Sheet C	1	2	3	4	5	6	7	8	9	10	Final
South Korea (Jeong) 🔨	1	1	0	0	2	0	1	0	0	X	5
Germany (Totzek)	0	0	2	1	0	2	0	2	5	X	12

Sheet D	1	2	3	4	5	6	7	8	9	10	Final
Italy (Retornaz)	0	0	0	0	1	0	0	1	0	X	2
Scotland (Mouat) 🔨	0	2	1	1	0	1	1	0	1	X	7

=== Draw 19 ===
Thursday, April 8, 9:00 am

Sheet A	1	2	3	4	5	6	7	8	9	10	11	Final
RCF (Glukhov)	0	2	0	0	1	0	2	0	0	1	2	8
Norway (Walstad) 🔨	1	0	0	2	0	1	0	2	0	0	0	6

Sheet B	1	2	3	4	5	6	7	8	9	10	Final
South Korea (Jeong) 🔨	1	0	2	2	0	1	0	0	1	X	7
Japan (Matsumura)	0	4	0	0	3	0	2	1	0	X	10

Sheet C	1	2	3	4	5	6	7	8	9	10	Final
Netherlands (van Dorp)	1	1	0	0	1	0	0	1	X	X	4
Switzerland (de Cruz) 🔨	0	0	2	2	0	2	2	0	X	X	8

Sheet D	1	2	3	4	5	6	7	8	9	10	Final
China (Zou) 🔨	1	0	1	0	1	0	1	0	0	X	4
Germany (Totzek)	0	0	0	2	0	3	0	1	2	X	8

=== Draw 20 ===
Thursday, April 8, 2:00 pm

Sheet A	1	2	3	4	5	6	7	8	9	10	Final
China (Zou) 🔨	1	1	0	1	0	0	1	0	2	0	6
Japan (Matsumura)	0	0	2	0	0	1	0	2	0	2	7

Sheet C	1	2	3	4	5	6	7	8	9	10	Final
Scotland (Mouat)	0	0	1	0	1	0	X	X	X	X	2
RCF (Glukhov) 🔨	1	1	0	4	0	3	X	X	X	X	9

Sheet D	1	2	3	4	5	6	7	8	9	10	Final
Denmark (Nørgård)	0	1	0	0	1	0	1	X	X	X	3
United States (Shuster) 🔨	0	0	2	2	0	4	0	X	X	X	8

=== Draw 21 ===
Thursday, April 8, 7:00 pm

Sheet A	1	2	3	4	5	6	7	8	9	10	Final
Switzerland (de Cruz) 🔨	1	0	0	2	0	4	0	2	X	X	9
South Korea (Jeong)	0	1	0	0	1	0	1	0	X	X	3

Sheet B	1	2	3	4	5	6	7	8	9	10	Final
United States (Shuster) 🔨	1	0	2	0	2	0	0	4	X	X	9
Netherlands (van Dorp)	0	1	0	2	0	0	1	0	X	X	4

Sheet C	1	2	3	4	5	6	7	8	9	10	Final
Sweden (Edin) 🔨	2	0	1	0	1	0	0	2	2	X	8
Germany (Totzek)	0	1	0	1	0	2	0	0	0	X	4

Sheet D	1	2	3	4	5	6	7	8	9	10	Final
Norway (Walstad)	0	1	0	0	0	2	0	0	1	X	4
Canada (Bottcher) 🔨	2	0	1	1	0	0	2	0	0	X	6

=== Draw 22 ===
Friday, April 9, 9:00 am

Sheet A	1	2	3	4	5	6	7	8	9	10	Final
Scotland (Mouat) 🔨	1	0	0	1	0	0	0	4	0	1	7
Norway (Walstad)	0	1	1	0	1	1	1	0	1	0	6

Sheet B	1	2	3	4	5	6	7	8	9	10	Final
Germany (Totzek)	0	0	2	0	1	0	0	3	0	X	6
Canada (Bottcher) 🔨	0	2	0	3	0	2	1	0	1	X	9

Sheet C	1	2	3	4	5	6	7	8	9	10	Final
Denmark (Nørgård)	0	2	1	0	1	0	0	X	X	X	4
Italy (Retornaz) 🔨	2	0	0	3	0	4	1	X	X	X	10

Sheet D	1	2	3	4	5	6	7	8	9	10	Final
Switzerland (de Cruz) 🔨	0	2	0	1	4	1	0	1	X	X	9
China (Zou)	0	0	2	0	0	0	2	0	X	X	4

=== Draw 23 ===
Friday, April 9, 2:00 pm

Sheet A	1	2	3	4	5	6	7	8	9	10	Final
Netherlands (van Dorp)	0	0	2	0	1	0	0	1	0	X	4
Italy (Retornaz) 🔨	0	2	0	0	0	4	1	0	1	X	8

Sheet B	1	2	3	4	5	6	7	8	9	10	Final
RCF (Glukhov)	1	0	0	3	1	1	0	1	0	X	7
Denmark (Nørgård) 🔨	0	1	1	0	0	0	1	0	1	X	4

Sheet C	1	2	3	4	5	6	7	8	9	10	Final
United States (Shuster) 🔨	1	0	2	0	0	2	2	1	X	X	8
South Korea (Jeong)	0	2	0	1	0	0	0	0	X	X	3

Sheet D	1	2	3	4	5	6	7	8	9	10	Final
Japan (Matsumura)	0	1	0	0	0	1	X	X	X	X	2
Sweden (Edin) 🔨	3	0	2	1	1	0	X	X	X	X	7

== Playoffs ==
Qualification games
3	United States	6
6	Switzerland	7
4	Canada	3
5	Scotland	5

Semifinals
1	Sweden	11
6	Switzerland	3
2	RCF	3
5	Scotland	5

Final
1	Sweden	10
5	Scotland	5
Bronze medal game
6	Switzerland	6
2	RCF	5

=== Qualification Game 1 ===
Friday, April 9, 7:00 pm

Sheet C	1	2	3	4	5	6	7	8	9	10	Final
Canada (Bottcher) 🔨	0	0	1	0	0	1	0	1	0	X	3
Scotland (Mouat)	0	0	0	0	1	0	2	0	2	X	5

Player percentages
Canada		Scotland	
Karrick Martin	90%	Hammy McMillan Jr.	98%
Brad Thiessen	75%	Bobby Lammie	90%
Darren Moulding	79%	Grant Hardie	91%
Brendan Bottcher	89%	Bruce Mouat	96%
Total	83%	Total	94%

=== Qualification Game 2 ===
Sunday, April 11, 11:00 am

Sheet C	1	2	3	4	5	6	7	8	9	10	Final
United States (Shuster) 🔨	0	1	0	0	2	0	1	1	0	1	6
Switzerland (de Cruz)	0	0	3	0	0	2	0	0	2	0	7

Player percentages
United States		Switzerland	
John Landsteiner	83%	Valentin Tanner	95%
Matt Hamilton	68%	Peter de Cruz	80%
Chris Plys	81%	Sven Michel	81%
John Shuster	74%	Benoît Schwarz	84%
Total	76%	Total	85%

=== Semifinals ===
Sunday, April 11, 4:00 pm

Sheet B	1	2	3	4	5	6	7	8	9	10	Final
Sweden (Edin) 🔨	1	0	1	0	5	1	0	3	X	X	11
Switzerland (de Cruz)	0	1	0	2	0	0	0	0	X	X	3

Player percentages
Sweden		Switzerland	
Christoffer Sundgren	73%	Valentin Tanner	97%
Rasmus Wranå	84%	Peter de Cruz	80%
Oskar Eriksson	91%	Sven Michel	77%
Niklas Edin	91%	Benoît Schwarz	69%
Total	85%	Total	80%

Sheet D	1	2	3	4	5	6	7	8	9	10	Final
RCF (Glukhov) 🔨	0	1	0	1	0	0	0	0	1	0	3
Scotland (Mouat)	0	0	3	0	0	0	0	1	0	1	5

Player percentages
RCF		Scotland	
Anton Kalalb	84%	Hammy McMillan Jr.	80%
Dmitry Mironov	74%	Bobby Lammie	95%
Evgeny Klimov	78%	Grant Hardie	93%
Sergey Glukhov	75%	Bruce Mouat	92%
Total	78%	Total	90%

=== Bronze medal game ===
Sunday, April 11, 9:00 pm

Sheet A	1	2	3	4	5	6	7	8	9	10	Final
Switzerland (de Cruz)	2	0	0	1	0	1	0	1	0	1	6
RCF (Glukhov) 🔨	0	1	0	0	2	0	1	0	1	0	5

Player percentages
Switzerland		RCF	
Valentin Tanner	99%	Anton Kalalb	71%
Peter de Cruz	96%	Dmitry Mironov	83%
Sven Michel	89%	Evgeny Klimov	78%
Benoît Schwarz	83%	Sergey Glukhov	74%
Total	92%	Total	76%

=== Final ===
Sunday, April 11, 9:00 pm

Sheet C	1	2	3	4	5	6	7	8	9	10	Final
Sweden (Edin) 🔨	1	0	2	0	1	0	1	0	5	X	10
Scotland (Mouat)	0	2	0	1	0	1	0	1	0	X	5

Player percentages
Sweden		Scotland	
Christoffer Sundgren	93%	Hammy McMillan Jr.	86%
Rasmus Wranå	86%	Bobby Lammie	74%
Oskar Eriksson	92%	Grant Hardie	94%
Niklas Edin	85%	Bruce Mouat	76%
Total	89%	Total	83%

== Statistics ==
=== Top 5 player percentages ===
Final round robin percentages

Leads	%
(Sweden) Christoffer Sundgren	92.1
(Switzerland) Valentin Tanner	91.9
(Scotland) Hammy McMillan Jr.	91.7
(Canada) Karrick Martin	90.7
(China) Xu Jingtao	89.4

Seconds	%
(Sweden) Rasmus Wranå	89.3
(Canada) Brad Thiessen	86.7
Dmitry Mironov	85.5
(Italy) Sebastiano Arman	85.4
(Scotland) Bobby Lammie	85.4

Thirds	%
(Sweden) Oskar Eriksson	89.1
(Scotland) Grant Hardie	86.2
(Italy) Amos Mosaner	84.7
(Canada) Darren Moulding	83.5
(United States) Chris Plys	83.4

Skips	%
(Canada) Brendan Bottcher	85.2
(Scotland) Bruce Mouat	85.1
(Sweden) Niklas Edin	84.5
Sergey Glukhov	82.0
(United States) John Shuster	81.1

=== Perfect games ===
Minimum 10 shots thrown

Player	Team	Position	Shots	Opponent
Lee Jun-hyung	South Korea	Lead	14	RCF
Grant Hardie	Scotland	Third	14	Denmark
Sebastiano Arman	Italy	Second	20	China
Brendan Bottcher	Canada	Skip	12	United States
Christoffer Sundgren	Sweden	Lead	12	Denmark
Tetsuro Shimizu	Japan	Third	18	Denmark
Amos Mosaner	Italy	Third	16	Norway
Bruce Mouat	Scotland	Skip	18	Italy
Valentin Tanner	Switzerland	Lead	16	China
Christoffer Sundgren	Sweden	Lead	10	Japan

== Awards ==
The awards were as follows:

Collie Campbell Memorial Award

- Oskar Eriksson, Sweden
