= 2022 World Men's Curling Championship =

Curling tournament in Las Vegas, Nevada, US

- Host city: Las Vegas, Nevada, United States
- Arena: Orleans Arena
- Dates: April 2–10, 2022
- Winner: Sweden
- Curling club: Karlstads CK, Karlstad
- Skip: Niklas Edin
- Third: Oskar Eriksson
- Second: Rasmus Wranå
- Lead: Christoffer Sundgren
- Alternate: Daniel Magnusson
- Coach: Fredrik Lindberg
- Finalist: Canada (Gushue)

The 2022 World Men's Curling Championship (branded as the 2022 LGT World Men's Curling Championship for sponsorship reasons) was held from April 2 to April 10 at Orleans Arena in Las Vegas, United States. Team Sweden, skipped by Niklas Edin, was the defending championship team. The 2022 WMCC trialed the no-tick rule for the first time at a men's tournament at this level.

In the final, Team Edin won its fourth straight world title, defeating Canada's Brad Gushue rink 8–6. It was the sixth career World title for Edin, whose team became the first ever to win an Olympic gold and World championship in the same year. In the game, Canada got off to a strong start, leading 3–0 after two. However, Sweden came back, tying it up at three in the fourth end, when Sweden scored a deuce after Gushue's last stone hit a ridge in the ice, and moved the wrong way. Canada was forced to a single in the fifth, and Sweden scored two in the sixth after Gushue missed a double takeout attempt. In the seventh, Gushue was forced to a single despite a crowded house, tying the game at five. In the ninth, with Canada down by one, Gushue missed a blank opportunity, by nosing a Swedish rock, and forcing the team to take one point, tying the game heading into the last end, without hammer. In the last end, with the score tied at six, Canada got off to a bad start when lead Geoff Walker hogged one of his rocks. On his final shot, Gushue missed his last draw against two Swedish stones, giving Sweden the championship. After the game, Gushue complained about the ice conditions, stating "(it was) the worst ice I've ever curled on in a major championship", due in part to there being four "ridges" on the ice. Edin agreed, stating that "(the) game was very tough, difficult conditions to play on."

Italy's team, skipped by Joël Retornaz, won the bronze medal game after defeating the host Americans 13–4.

== Qualification ==
The World Curling Federation changed the qualification process for the World Curling Championships beginning in 2022 in key ways, as a transition year to a new qualification format for 2023. As before, the selection process started with the presumption that Europe receives eight entries, with two entries each from the American and Pacific-Asia Zones, but with a reduction of entries from one of the three zones – the zone with the lowest ranked competitor in the previous World Curling Championship. Two additional entries were then determined by the 2022 World Qualification Event, bringing the total to thirteen entries for the championship. The host nation for the championship continues to receive a guaranteed entry as one of the entries in its zone. The Americas Challenge was required as a means of entry for at least one team from the Americas in 2022. No entry was determined by tour-based rankings. Beginning in 2023, this system will be replaced, with all entries determined by two world zones championships. Seven guaranteed entries will come from the European Championship and five guaranteed entries from a Pan Continental Championship, the latter of which will include the America zone and the Pacific-Asia zone. The thirteenth entry will be determined by assessing the aggregate performance of the top five teams in each zone, with an extra entry from the better performing zone.

As a result of these changes, Canada participated in the Americas Challenge in order to qualify for the 2022 World Men's Curling Championship, represented by Team Bottcher, which won the event and qualified Canada as an entry. Though fourteen teams competed at the 2021 World Men's Curling Championship, South Korea and China were ranked thirteenth and fourteenth, removing one automatic entry for the Pacific-Asia zone for the 2022 Championships. The remaining entries were determined by the playoffs at the 2022 World Qualification Event.

Means of qualification	Vacancies	Qualified
Host Nation	1	United States
2021 Americas Challenge	1	Canada
2021 European Curling Championships	8	Scotland; Sweden; Italy; Norway; Switzerland; Denmark; Czech Republic; Germany
2021 Pacific-Asia Curling Championships	1	South Korea
2022 World Qualification Event	~~2~~ 1	~~RCF~~; Netherlands
Emergency Ruling Replacement	1	Finland
TOTAL	13	

=== Russian Participation ===
As part of international sports' reaction to the Russian invasion of Ukraine, on February 28 the World Curling Federation initiated proceedings to remove the Russian Curling Federation from the upcoming Curling Championship. In its statement the WCF said:

The World Curling Federation strongly condemns the military action undertaken by the Russian Government in their invasion of Ukraine and continues to hope for a swift and peaceful resolution to the situation.

On March 4, the World Curling Federation announced the removal of the Russian Curling Federation from the 2022 World Championships. On March 12, they announced that Finland, who placed third in the Qualifying event, would replace the RCF.

== Teams ==
The teams are as follows:

Canada	Czech Republic	Denmark	Finland	Germany
St. John's CC, St. John's Skip: Brad Gushue; Third: Mark Nichols; Second: Brett Gallant; Lead: Geoff Walker; Alternate: E. J. Harnden	CC Zbraslav, Zbraslav, CC Dion, Prague, CC Brno, Brno & CC Sokol Liboc, Prague Skip: Lukáš Klíma; Third: Marek Černovský; Second: Radek Boháč; Lead: Jiří Candra; Alternate: Lukáš Klípa	Gentofte CC, Gentofte & Hvidovre CC, Hvidovre Skip: Tobias Thune; Third: Kasper Wiksten; Second: Oliver Rosenkrands Søe; Lead: Mikkel Krause; Alternate: Daniel Poulsen	Kisakallio CC, Lohja Skip: Kalle Kiiskinen; Third: Teemu Salo; Second: Leo Ouni; Lead: Paavo Kuosmanen; Alternate: Jermu Pöllänen	Baden Hills G&CC, Füssen Skip: Sixten Totzek; Third: Marc Muskatewitz; Second: Joshua Sutor; Lead: Dominik Greindl; Alternate: Benjamin Kapp
Italy	Netherlands	Norway	Scotland	South Korea
Torino-Pinerolo CC, Pinerolo & Aeronautica Militare Skip: Joël Retornaz; Third: Amos Mosaner; Second: Sebastiano Arman; Lead: Simone Gonin; Alternate: Mattia Giovanella	CC PWA Zoetermeer, Zoetermeer Skip: Wouter Gösgens; Third: Jaap van Dorp; Second: Laurens Hoekman; Lead: Carlo Glasbergen; Alternate: Tobias van den Hurk	Trondheim CK, Trondheim Skip: Magnus Ramsfjell; Third: Martin Sesaker; Second: Bendik Ramsfjell; Lead: Gaute Nepstad; Alternate: Mathias Brænden	Stirling CC, Stirling Fourth: Ross Paterson; Skip: Kyle Waddell; Second: Duncan Menzies; Lead: Craig Waddell; Alternate: Euan Kyle	Uiseong CC, Uiseong Fourth: Kim Soo-hyuk; Skip: Kim Chang-min; Second: Seong Se-hyeon; Lead: Kim Hak-kyun; Alternate: Jeon Jae-ik
Sweden	Switzerland	United States		
Karlstads CK, Karlstad Skip: Niklas Edin; Third: Oskar Eriksson; Second: Rasmus Wranå; Lead: Christoffer Sundgren; Alternate: Daniel Magnusson	Bern Zähringer CC, Bern Skip: Yannick Schwaller; Third: Michael Brunner; Second: Romano Meier; Lead: Marcel Käufeler; Alternate: Simon Gloor	Chaska CC, Chaska Skip: Korey Dropkin; Third: Joe Polo; Second: Mark Fenner; Lead: Tom Howell; Alternate: Alex Fenson		

=== WCF ranking ===
Year to date World Curling Federation order of merit ranking for each team before the event.

Nation (Skip)	Rank	Points
Canada (Gushue)	1	446.5
Sweden (Edin)	4	335.5
Italy (Retornaz)	14	183.9
Switzerland (Schwaller)	15	172.4
Germany (Totzek)	25	121.5
Scotland (Waddell)	34	91.0
Norway (Ramsfjell)	36	83.6
Netherlands (Gösgens)	41	76.7
South Korea (Kim)	43	73.4
Czech Republic (Klíma)	44	73.4
United States (Dropkin)	47	70.4
Finland (Kiiskinen)	82	43.8
Denmark (Thune)	NR	0.0

== Rule changes ==
The main rule change between the 2021 and 2022 WMCC is the introduction of the no-tick rule. This will prohibit ticking a stone off of the centre line until after the fifth stone of the end has been thrown. If a stone is ticked off of the centre line before then, it is restored to its position, similar to if a stone is removed from play from the free guard zone.

== Round-robin standings ==
Final round-robin standings

Key
Teams to Playoffs

Country	Skip	W	L	W–L	PF	PA	EW	EL	BE	SE	S%	DSC
Canada	Brad Gushue	10	2	–	100	64	56	45	1	18	85.2%	31.61
Sweden	Niklas Edin	9	3	–	87	57	50	43	7	11	85.2%	12.09
Italy	Joël Retornaz	8	4	–	88	80	55	50	6	15	83.1%	41.08
Scotland	Kyle Waddell	7	5	1–0	77	70	56	43	5	19	83.4%	21.15
United States	Korey Dropkin	7	5	0–1	81	69	51	45	8	13	80.5%	31.63
Switzerland	Yannick Schwaller	6	6	1–1	72	69	45	49	7	8	80.6%	18.75
Germany	Sixten Totzek	6	6	1–1	91	83	51	48	5	13	81.6%	29.05
South Korea	Kim Chang-min	6	6	1–1	83	83	51	48	7	14	77.6%	37.70
Czech Republic	Lukáš Klíma	5	7	1–0	73	71	42	48	10	8	78.3%	38.57
Norway	Magnus Ramsfjell	5	7	0–1	77	80	46	53	7	11	80.0%	28.61
Finland	Kalle Kiiskinen	4	8	–	67	90	44	52	6	9	75.6%	42.41
Netherlands	Wouter Gösgens	3	9	–	65	98	44	54	5	9	77.3%	39.30
Denmark	Tobias Thune	2	10	–	49	96	36	49	6	11	75.9%	58.46

Round robin summary table
Pos.	Country	Canada	Czech Republic	Denmark	Finland	Germany	Italy	Netherlands	Norway	Scotland	South Korea	Sweden	Switzerland	United States	Record
1	Canada	—N/a	6–4	9–2	8–3	11–7	10–4	9–6	8–7	8–6	10–2	5–7	10–6	6–10	10–2
9	Czech Republic	4–6	—	9–2	10–4	9–4	5–6	11–5	7–4	0–6	4–10	4–8	5–9	5–7	5–7
13	Denmark	2–9	2–9	—	6–10	7–10	3–7	7–2	6–10	3–7	7–6	4–11	0–7	2–8	2–10
11	Finland	3–8	4–10	10–6	—	4–11	7–10	9–8	4–5	5–10	11–4	2–7	6–4	2–7	4–8
7	Germany	7–11	4–9	10–7	11–4	—	8–11	13–7	10–6	4–6	4–9	2–7	10–3	8–3	6–6
3	Italy	4–10	6–5	7–3	10–7	11–8	—	9–11	9–6	4–5	5–10	10–8	W–L	8–4	8–4
12	Netherlands	6–9	5–11	2–7	8–9	7–13	11–9	—	3–8	5–4	8–7	4–7	3–6	3–8	3–9
10	Norway	7–8	4–7	10–6	5–4	6–10	6–9	8–3	—	7–4	7–3	6–7	3–9	8–10	5–7
4	Scotland	6–8	6–0	7–3	10–5	6–4	5–4	4–5	4–7	—	6–9	2–8	9–7	9–7	7–5
8	South Korea	2–10	10–4	6–7	4–11	9–4	10–5	7–8	3–7	9–6	—	7–5	7–9	9–7	6–6
2	Sweden	7–5	8–4	11–4	7–2	7–2	8–10	7–4	7–6	8–2	5–7	—	7–8	5–3	9–3
6	Switzerland	6–10	9–5	7–0	4–6	3–10	L–W	6–3	9–3	7–9	9–7	8–7	—	4–7	6–6
5	United States	10–6	7–5	8–2	7–2	3–8	4–8	8–3	10–8	7–9	7–9	3–5	7–4	—	7–5

== Round-robin results ==
All draw times are listed in Pacific Time (UTC−07:00).

=== Draw 1 ===
Saturday, April 2, 2:00 pm

Sheet A	1	2	3	4	5	6	7	8	9	10	Final
Canada (Gushue) 🔨	1	1	0	2	0	1	0	0	1	X	6
Czech Republic (Klíma)	0	0	1	0	0	0	2	1	0	X	4

Sheet B	1	2	3	4	5	6	7	8	9	10	Final
Sweden (Edin)	0	0	1	1	1	0	3	0	0	1	7
Netherlands (Gösgens) 🔨	1	1	0	0	0	1	0	0	1	0	4

Sheet C	1	2	3	4	5	6	7	8	9	10	Final
Denmark (Thune)	0	1	0	0	1	0	0	0	X	X	2
United States (Dropkin) 🔨	0	0	1	1	0	1	2	3	X	X	8

Sheet D	1	2	3	4	5	6	7	8	9	10	Final
South Korea (Kim)	0	1	0	1	0	1	0	0	0	X	3
Norway (Ramsfjell) 🔨	0	0	0	0	1	0	2	1	3	X	7

=== Draw 2 ===
Saturday, April 2, 7:00 pm

Sheet A	1	2	3	4	5	6	7	8	9	10	Final
Italy (Retornaz)	0	0	0	0	2	0	1	1	0	0	4
Scotland (Waddell) 🔨	1	1	0	1	0	1	0	0	0	1	5

Sheet B	1	2	3	4	5	6	7	8	9	10	Final
Canada (Gushue)	0	2	0	1	1	0	2	0	0	2	8
Norway (Ramsfjell) 🔨	1	0	2	0	0	1	0	2	1	0	7

Sheet C	1	2	3	4	5	6	7	8	9	10	Final
Finland (Kiiskinen)	0	0	2	0	0	2	0	1	0	1	6
Switzerland (Schwaller) 🔨	0	1	0	1	1	0	0	0	1	0	4

Sheet D	1	2	3	4	5	6	7	8	9	10	Final
Germany (Totzek) 🔨	3	0	1	3	0	3	0	3	X	X	13
Netherlands (Gösgens)	0	1	0	0	4	0	2	0	X	X	7

=== Draw 3 ===
Sunday, April 3, 9:00 am

Sheet A	1	2	3	4	5	6	7	8	9	10	Final
Switzerland (Schwaller)	0	1	1	0	0	1	0	2	1	2	8
Sweden (Edin) 🔨	2	0	0	0	4	0	1	0	0	0	7

Sheet B	1	2	3	4	5	6	7	8	9	10	Final
Scotland (Waddell)	0	2	0	0	1	1	0	2	0	0	6
South Korea (Kim) 🔨	2	0	0	2	0	0	1	0	2	2	9

Sheet C	1	2	3	4	5	6	7	8	9	10	Final
Czech Republic (Klíma) 🔨	1	0	0	2	3	0	2	0	1	X	9
Germany (Totzek)	0	1	0	0	0	1	0	2	0	X	4

Sheet D	1	2	3	4	5	6	7	8	9	10	Final
Finland (Kiiskinen) 🔨	0	1	0	0	0	3	3	0	3	X	10
Denmark (Thune)	0	0	3	0	1	0	0	2	0	X	6

=== Draw 4 ===
Sunday, April 3, 2:00 pm

Sheet A	1	2	3	4	5	6	7	8	9	10	11	Final
South Korea (Kim) 🔨	0	2	0	1	0	0	0	1	0	2	0	6
Denmark (Thune)	1	0	1	0	0	1	0	0	3	0	1	7

Sheet B	1	2	3	4	5	6	7	8	9	10	Final
United States (Dropkin)	1	0	0	1	0	2	0	2	0	1	7
Czech Republic (Klíma) 🔨	0	1	1	0	1	0	1	0	1	0	5

Sheet C	1	2	3	4	5	6	7	8	9	10	Final
Netherlands (Gösgens) 🔨	1	1	0	1	2	0	0	0	1	0	6
Canada (Gushue)	0	0	2	0	0	2	1	3	0	1	9

Sheet D	1	2	3	4	5	6	7	8	9	10	Final
Sweden (Edin) 🔨	0	0	3	0	1	0	2	0	2	0	8
Italy (Retornaz)	1	1	0	2	0	1	0	1	0	4	10

=== Draw 5 ===
Sunday, April 3, 7:00 pm

Sheet A	1	2	3	4	5	6	7	8	9	10	Final
Germany (Totzek)	0	0	3	0	1	2	0	0	2	X	8
United States (Dropkin) 🔨	0	1	0	1	0	0	1	0	0	X	3

Sheet B	1	2	3	4	5	6	7	8	9	10	Final
Italy (Retornaz)	0	2	1	0	3	1	1	0	2	X	10
Finland (Kiiskinen) 🔨	2	0	0	4	0	0	0	1	0	X	7

Sheet C	1	2	3	4	5	6	7	8	9	10	Final
Norway (Ramsfjell)	0	0	1	2	0	1	1	0	2	X	7
Scotland (Waddell) 🔨	0	2	0	0	1	0	0	1	0	X	4

Sheet D	1	2	3	4	5	6	7	8	9	10	Final
Switzerland (Schwaller) 🔨	3	1	0	0	1	0	1	0	0	X	6
Canada (Gushue)	0	0	0	4	0	2	0	2	2	X	10

=== Draw 6 ===
Monday, April 4, 9:00 am

Sheet A	1	2	3	4	5	6	7	8	9	10	Final
Czech Republic (Klíma) 🔨	0	2	0	1	0	0	1	0	3	X	7
Norway (Ramsfjell)	0	0	1	0	0	2	0	1	0	X	4

Sheet B	1	2	3	4	5	6	7	8	9	10	Final
Denmark (Thune) 🔨	1	0	0	2	0	1	0	0	X	X	4
Sweden (Edin)	0	4	0	0	2	0	0	5	X	X	11

Sheet C	1	2	3	4	5	6	7	8	9	10	Final
Germany (Totzek)	0	2	0	2	0	2	0	2	3	X	11
Finland (Kiiskinen) 🔨	1	0	1	0	1	0	1	0	0	X	4

=== Draw 7 ===
Monday, April 4, 2:00 pm

Sheet A	1	2	3	4	5	6	7	8	9	10	Final
Denmark (Thune)	0	0	1	0	0	2	0	0	0	0	3
Scotland (Waddell) 🔨	0	1	0	2	0	0	1	0	1	2	7

Sheet B	1	2	3	4	5	6	7	8	9	10	Final
Netherlands (Gösgens)	0	0	0	0	1	0	1	0	1	0	3
Switzerland (Schwaller) 🔨	0	0	1	0	0	2	0	2	0	1	6

Sheet C	1	2	3	4	5	6	7	8	9	10	Final
Canada (Gushue)	0	2	0	3	0	2	1	2	X	X	10
Italy (Retornaz) 🔨	1	0	1	0	2	0	0	0	X	X	4

Sheet D	1	2	3	4	5	6	7	8	9	10	Final
United States (Dropkin)	0	0	3	0	0	2	0	0	2	X	7
South Korea (Kim) 🔨	0	3	0	3	1	0	1	1	0	X	9

=== Draw 8 ===
Monday, April 4, 7:00 pm

Sheet A	1	2	3	4	5	6	7	8	9	10	Final
Finland (Kiiskinen)	0	0	0	1	0	1	X	X	X	X	2
Sweden (Edin) 🔨	0	3	0	0	4	0	X	X	X	X	7

Sheet B	1	2	3	4	5	6	7	8	9	10	Final
Norway (Ramsfjell)	0	0	2	0	0	0	3	0	3	X	8
United States (Dropkin) 🔨	0	2	0	1	1	3	0	3	0	X	10

Sheet C	1	2	3	4	5	6	7	8	9	10	Final
Switzerland (Schwaller) 🔨	4	1	0	0	2	0	2	0	X	X	9
Czech Republic (Klíma)	0	0	1	0	0	2	0	2	X	X	5

Sheet D	1	2	3	4	5	6	7	8	9	10	Final
Scotland (Waddell)	0	0	1	0	0	0	1	1	0	3	6
Germany (Totzek) 🔨	1	1	0	0	1	0	0	0	1	0	4

=== Draw 9 ===
Tuesday, April 5, 9:00 am

Sheet B	1	2	3	4	5	6	7	8	9	10	Final
Sweden (Edin) 🔨	0	2	0	2	0	0	2	0	2	X	8
Czech Republic (Klíma)	1	0	1	0	1	0	0	1	0	X	4

Sheet C	1	2	3	4	5	6	7	8	9	10	Final
South Korea (Kim) 🔨	0	2	0	1	0	1	0	0	X	X	4
Finland (Kiiskinen)	1	0	2	0	1	0	5	2	X	X	11

Sheet D	1	2	3	4	5	6	7	8	9	10	Final
Italy (Retornaz)	1	0	5	0	0	1	0	2	0	0	9
Netherlands (Gösgens) 🔨	0	1	0	1	3	0	1	0	3	2	11

=== Draw 10 ===
Tuesday, April 5, 2:00 pm

Sheet A	1	2	3	4	5	6	7	8	9	10	Final
Scotland (Waddell) 🔨	1	1	0	2	0	2	0	2	0	1	9
United States (Dropkin)	0	0	2	0	3	0	1	0	1	0	7

Sheet B	1	2	3	4	5	6	7	8	9	10	Final
Germany (Totzek) 🔨	0	3	2	0	1	0	0	1	0	X	7
Canada (Gushue)	1	0	0	3	0	3	1	0	3	X	11

Sheet C	1	2	3	4	5	6	7	8	9	10	Final
Italy (Retornaz) 🔨	0	0	1	0	2	0	0	2	2	X	7
Denmark (Thune)	1	0	0	1	0	1	0	0	0	X	3

Sheet D	1	2	3	4	5	6	7	8	9	10	Final
Norway (Ramsfjell)	0	0	1	0	1	0	1	0	X	X	3
Switzerland (Schwaller) 🔨	1	0	0	1	0	3	0	4	X	X	9

=== Draw 11 ===
Tuesday, April 5, 7:00 pm

Sheet A	1	2	3	4	5	6	7	8	9	10	Final
Netherlands (Gösgens) 🔨	0	0	0	1	0	1	1	0	X	X	3
Norway (Ramsfjell)	0	1	5	0	2	0	0	0	X	X	8

Sheet B	1	2	3	4	5	6	7	8	9	10	Final
Finland (Kiiskinen)	0	2	0	0	1	1	0	1	0	X	5
Scotland (Waddell) 🔨	2	0	1	3	0	0	2	0	2	X	10

Sheet C	1	2	3	4	5	6	7	8	9	10	Final
Sweden (Edin) 🔨	2	1	1	0	2	0	1	X	X	X	7
Germany (Totzek)	0	0	0	2	0	0	0	X	X	X	2

Sheet D	1	2	3	4	5	6	7	8	9	10	Final
Czech Republic (Klíma) 🔨	0	2	0	0	0	2	0	0	X	X	4
South Korea (Kim)	2	0	0	1	3	0	2	2	X	X	10

=== Draw 12 ===
Wednesday, April 6, 9:00 am

Sheet A	1	2	3	4	5	6	7	8	9	10	Final
Switzerland (Schwaller) 🔨	0	2	1	1	2	1	X	X	X	X	7
Denmark (Thune)	0	0	0	0	0	0	X	X	X	X	0

Sheet B	1	2	3	4	5	6	7	8	9	10	Final
South Korea (Kim)	0	0	3	1	2	0	2	0	2	X	10
Italy (Retornaz) 🔨	0	1	0	0	0	3	0	1	0	X	5

Sheet C	1	2	3	4	5	6	7	8	9	10	Final
United States (Dropkin) 🔨	0	1	0	2	0	0	3	1	1	X	8
Netherlands (Gösgens)	0	0	1	0	2	0	0	0	0	X	3

Sheet D	1	2	3	4	5	6	7	8	9	10	Final
Canada (Gushue)	0	1	0	1	0	0	2	0	1	0	5
Sweden (Edin) 🔨	0	0	1	0	1	1	0	2	0	2	7

=== Draw 13 ===
Wednesday, April 6, 2:00 pm

Sheet A	1	2	3	4	5	6	7	8	9	10	Final
Germany (Totzek) 🔨	2	0	2	0	1	0	2	0	1	0	8
Italy (Retornaz)	0	2	0	2	0	3	0	3	0	1	11

Sheet B	1	2	3	4	5	6	7	8	9	10	Final
Switzerland (Schwaller) 🔨	0	2	0	1	0	0	1	0	0	0	4
United States (Dropkin)	1	0	1	0	0	2	0	1	1	1	7

Sheet C	1	2	3	4	5	6	7	8	9	10	Final
Scotland (Waddell)	0	1	0	1	0	0	1	1	2	X	6
Czech Republic (Klíma) 🔨	0	0	0	0	0	0	0	0	0	X	0

Sheet D	1	2	3	4	5	6	7	8	9	10	Final
Norway (Ramsfjell) 🔨	0	1	0	2	0	0	1	0	0	1	5
Finland (Kiiskinen)	1	0	1	0	0	0	0	1	1	0	4

=== Draw 14 ===
Wednesday, April 6, 7:00 pm

Sheet A	1	2	3	4	5	6	7	8	9	10	Final
Sweden (Edin) 🔨	1	1	0	0	2	0	0	1	0	0	5
South Korea (Kim)	0	0	2	1	0	0	1	0	2	1	7

Sheet B	1	2	3	4	5	6	7	8	9	10	Final
Czech Republic (Klíma) 🔨	3	0	0	0	6	0	0	2	X	X	11
Netherlands (Gösgens)	0	1	0	1	0	2	1	0	X	X	5

Sheet C	1	2	3	4	5	6	7	8	9	10	Final
Finland (Kiiskinen) 🔨	0	1	0	0	1	0	1	0	0	X	3
Canada (Gushue)	1	0	2	0	0	2	0	1	2	X	8

Sheet D	1	2	3	4	5	6	7	8	9	10	11	Final
Denmark (Thune)	0	1	0	0	3	0	0	2	0	1	0	7
Germany (Totzek) 🔨	2	0	2	1	0	0	2	0	0	0	3	10

=== Draw 15 ===
Thursday, April 7, 9:00 am

Sheet A	1	2	3	4	5	6	7	8	9	10	Final
United States (Dropkin) 🔨	2	0	1	0	4	0	2	0	1	X	10
Canada (Gushue)	0	1	0	1	0	2	0	2	0	X	6

Sheet B	1	2	3	4	5	6	7	8	9	10	Final
Norway (Ramsfjell) 🔨	2	0	0	2	0	2	2	2	0	X	10
Denmark (Thune)	0	2	1	0	2	0	0	0	1	X	6

Sheet C	1	2	3	4	5	6	7	8	9	10	Final
Italy (Retornaz)	0	1	0	1	0	1	0	1	1		W
Switzerland (Schwaller) 🔨	1	0	1	0	0	0	1	0	0	/	L^

Sheet D	1	2	3	4	5	6	7	8	9	10	Final
Netherlands (Gösgens)	0	0	1	0	0	2	0	0	0	2	5
Scotland (Waddell) 🔨	1	1	0	1	0	0	0	1	0	0	4

^Switzerland ran out of time, and therefore forfeited the match.

=== Draw 16 ===
Thursday, April 7, 2:00 pm

Sheet A	1	2	3	4	5	6	7	8	9	10	Final
Czech Republic (Klíma) 🔨	2	0	3	1	2	0	0	2	X	X	10
Finland (Kiiskinen)	0	2	0	0	0	1	1	0	X	X	4

Sheet B	1	2	3	4	5	6	7	8	9	10	Final
Scotland (Waddell)	0	0	1	0	0	0	1	0	X	X	2
Sweden (Edin) 🔨	1	1	0	1	1	2	0	2	X	X	8

Sheet C	1	2	3	4	5	6	7	8	9	10	Final
Germany (Totzek) 🔨	1	0	3	0	1	1	0	1	1	2	10
Norway (Ramsfjell)	0	2	0	2	0	0	2	0	0	0	6

Sheet D	1	2	3	4	5	6	7	8	9	10	Final
South Korea (Kim)	1	0	1	0	2	0	1	0	2	0	7
Switzerland (Schwaller) 🔨	0	2	0	2	0	2	0	2	0	1	9

=== Draw 17 ===
Thursday, April 7, 7:00 pm

Sheet A	1	2	3	4	5	6	7	8	9	10	Final
Denmark (Thune)	1	1	2	1	0	0	0	1	1	X	7
Netherlands (Gösgens) 🔨	0	0	0	0	2	0	0	0	0	X	2

Sheet B	1	2	3	4	5	6	7	8	9	10	Final
Canada (Gushue) 🔨	3	3	0	1	3	0	X	X	X	X	10
South Korea (Kim)	0	0	1	0	0	1	X	X	X	X	2

Sheet C	1	2	3	4	5	6	7	8	9	10	Final
United States (Dropkin)	0	0	1	0	0	1	0	0	1	0	3
Sweden (Edin) 🔨	1	0	0	0	1	0	0	1	0	2	5

Sheet D	1	2	3	4	5	6	7	8	9	10	11	Final
Italy (Retornaz) 🔨	1	0	0	2	0	1	0	1	0	0	1	6
Czech Republic (Klíma)	0	0	1	0	0	0	2	0	1	1	0	5

=== Draw 18 ===
Friday, April 8, 9:00 am

Sheet A	1	2	3	4	5	6	7	8	9	10	11	Final
Norway (Ramsfjell) 🔨	1	0	1	0	1	0	0	0	2	1	0	6
Italy (Retornaz)	0	1	0	1	0	2	1	1	0	0	3	9

Sheet B	1	2	3	4	5	6	7	8	9	10	Final
Switzerland (Schwaller)	0	0	0	2	0	1	X	X	X	X	3
Germany (Totzek) 🔨	3	3	1	0	3	0	X	X	X	X	10

Sheet C	1	2	3	4	5	6	7	8	9	10	Final
Canada (Gushue)	1	0	2	1	0	1	0	1	0	2	8
Scotland (Waddell) 🔨	0	2	0	0	1	0	1	0	2	0	6

Sheet D	1	2	3	4	5	6	7	8	9	10	Final
Finland (Kiiskinen)	0	0	0	1	0	1	0	0	X	X	2
United States (Dropkin) 🔨	0	2	1	0	1	0	2	1	X	X	7

=== Draw 19 ===
Friday, April 8, 2:00 pm

Sheet A	1	2	3	4	5	6	7	8	9	10	Final
South Korea (Kim) 🔨	0	2	2	0	2	0	0	1	2	X	9
Germany (Totzek)	1	0	0	1	0	1	1	0	0	X	4

Sheet B	1	2	3	4	5	6	7	8	9	10	11	Final
Netherlands (Gösgens)	0	1	0	1	0	3	0	0	2	1	0	8
Finland (Kiiskinen) 🔨	3	0	1	0	1	0	2	1	0	0	1	9

Sheet C	1	2	3	4	5	6	7	8	9	10	Final
Czech Republic (Klíma) 🔨	1	1	0	4	0	3	X	X	X	X	9
Denmark (Thune)	0	0	1	0	1	0	X	X	X	X	2

Sheet D	1	2	3	4	5	6	7	8	9	10	Final
Sweden (Edin) 🔨	1	0	2	0	1	0	1	0	0	2	7
Norway (Ramsfjell)	0	2	0	1	0	0	0	0	3	0	6

=== Draw 20 ===
Friday, April 8, 7:00 pm

Sheet A	1	2	3	4	5	6	7	8	9	10	Final
Scotland (Waddell) 🔨	2	1	1	1	0	1	0	2	0	1	9
Switzerland (Schwaller)	0	0	0	0	1	0	3	0	3	0	7

Sheet B	1	2	3	4	5	6	7	8	9	10	Final
United States (Dropkin)	0	0	0	0	2	0	2	0	0	X	4
Italy (Retornaz) 🔨	0	0	3	1	0	1	0	2	1	X	8

Sheet C	1	2	3	4	5	6	7	8	9	10	11	Final
Netherlands (Gösgens) 🔨	1	0	0	2	0	2	0	0	2	0	1	8
South Korea (Kim)	0	0	3	0	2	0	0	1	0	1	0	7

Sheet D	1	2	3	4	5	6	7	8	9	10	Final
Denmark (Thune)	0	1	0	1	0	0	X	X	X	X	2
Canada (Gushue) 🔨	2	0	3	0	2	2	X	X	X	X	9

== Playoffs ==
Qualification games
4	Scotland	4
5	United States	6
3	Italy	10
6	Switzerland	4

Semifinals
1	Canada	8
5	United States	5
2	Sweden	8
3	Italy	4

Final
1	Canada	6
2	Sweden	8
Bronze-medal game
5	United States	4
3	Italy	13

=== Qualification games ===
Saturday, April 9, 2:00 pm

Sheet B	1	2	3	4	5	6	7	8	9	10	Final
Italy (Retornaz) 🔨	4	0	1	0	2	1	0	2	X	X	10
Switzerland (Schwaller)	0	1	0	2	0	0	1	0	X	X	4

Player percentages
Italy		Switzerland	
Simone Gonin	97%	Simon Gloor	92%
Sebastiano Arman	91%	Romano Meier	56%
Amos Mosaner	98%	Michael Brunner	86%
Joël Retornaz	92%	Yannick Schwaller	66%
Total	95%	Total	75%

Sheet D	1	2	3	4	5	6	7	8	9	10	Final
Scotland (Waddell) 🔨	0	1	0	0	0	0	1	1	1	0	4
United States (Dropkin)	2	0	1	1	1	0	0	0	0	1	6

Player percentages
Scotland		United States	
Craig Waddell	100%	Tom Howell	80%
Duncan Menzies	78%	Mark Fenner	81%
Kyle Waddell	79%	Joe Polo	88%
Ross Paterson	59%	Korey Dropkin	71%
Total	79%	Total	80%

=== Semifinals ===
Saturday, April 9, 7:00 pm

Sheet B	1	2	3	4	5	6	7	8	9	10	Final
Canada (Gushue) 🔨	0	2	0	1	0	2	0	1	0	2	8
United States (Dropkin)	0	0	1	0	1	0	1	0	2	0	5

Player percentages
Canada		United States	
Geoff Walker	85%	Tom Howell	78%
Brett Gallant	74%	Mark Fenner	80%
Mark Nichols	75%	Joe Polo	79%
Brad Gushue	71%	Korey Dropkin	66%
Total	76%	Total	76%

Sheet D	1	2	3	4	5	6	7	8	9	10	Final
Sweden (Edin) 🔨	0	2	1	0	4	0	0	0	1	X	8
Italy (Retornaz)	0	0	0	1	0	1	1	1	0	X	4

Player percentages
Sweden		Italy	
Daniel Magnusson	89%	Simone Gonin	90%
Rasmus Wranå	88%	Sebastiano Arman	89%
Oskar Eriksson	94%	Amos Mosaner	89%
Niklas Edin	88%	Joël Retornaz	85%
Total	90%	Total	88%

=== Bronze-medal game ===
Sunday, April 10, 11:00 am

Sheet C	1	2	3	4	5	6	7	8	9	10	Final
United States (Dropkin)	0	2	1	0	0	1	0	0	X	X	4
Italy (Retornaz) 🔨	4	0	0	2	1	0	6	0	X	X	13

Player percentages
United States		Italy	
Tom Howell	93%	Simone Gonin	86%
Mark Fenner	61%	Sebastiano Arman	84%
Joe Polo	61%	Amos Mosaner	88%
Korey Dropkin	59%	Joël Retornaz	77%
Total	68%	Total	84%

=== Final ===
Sunday, April 10, 4:00 pm

Sheet C	1	2	3	4	5	6	7	8	9	10	Final
Canada (Gushue) 🔨	1	2	0	0	1	0	1	0	1	0	6
Sweden (Edin)	0	0	2	1	0	2	0	1	0	2	8

Player percentages
Canada		Sweden	
Geoff Walker	91%	Daniel Magnusson	86%
Brett Gallant	93%	Rasmus Wranå	79%
Mark Nichols	80%	Oskar Eriksson	69%
Brad Gushue	62%	Niklas Edin	78%
Total	82%	Total	78%

== Statistics ==
=== Top 5 player percentages ===
Final round robin percentages

Leads	%
(Sweden) Christoffer Sundgren	92.2
(Canada) Geoff Walker	89.5
(Italy) Simone Gonin	89.0
(Germany) Dominik Greindl	88.3
(Scotland) Craig Waddell	88.1

Seconds	%
(Canada) Brett Gallant	85.3
(Sweden) Rasmus Wranå	85.2
(Scotland) Duncan Menzies	84.4
(Italy) Sebastiano Arman	84.3
(Switzerland) Romano Meier	83.3

Thirds	%
(Scotland) Kyle Waddell (Skip)	84.3
(Sweden) Oskar Eriksson	83.6
(Canada) Mark Nichols	83.0
(Germany) Marc Muskatewitz	82.5
(United States) Joe Polo	82.1

Skips	%
(Canada) Brad Gushue	83.7
(Sweden) Niklas Edin	82.3
(Italy) Joël Retornaz	80.2
(United States) Korey Dropkin	77.3
(Scotland) Ross Paterson (Fourth)	76.6

=== Perfect games ===
Minimum 10 shots thrown

Player	Team	Position	Shots	Opponent
Romano Meier	Switzerland	Second	12	Denmark
Kim Hak-kyun	South Korea	Lead	12	Canada
Dominik Greindl	Germany	Lead	10	Switzerland
Sebastiano Arman	Italy	Second	18	United States
Craig Waddell	Scotland	Lead	20	United States (qualification game)

== Final standings ==
Place	Team
1st place, gold medalist(s)	Sweden
2nd place, silver medalist(s)	Canada
3rd place, bronze medalist(s)	Italy
4	United States
5	Scotland
6	Switzerland
7	Germany
8	South Korea
9	Czech Republic
10	Norway
11	Finland
12	Netherlands
13	Denmark

== Awards ==
The awards were as follows:

Collie Campbell Memorial Award

- Simone Gonin, Italy
