= Sebastiano Arman =

Italian curler (born 1997)

- Curler
- Born: 17 January 1997 (age 29); Trento, Italy

Team
- Skip: Stefano Spiller
- Third: Amos Mosaner
- Second: Sebastiano Arman
- Lead: Cesare Spiller

Curling career
- Member Association: Italy
- World Championship: 8 (2015, 2019, 2021, 2022, 2023, 2024, 2025, 2026)
- World Mixed Doubles Championship: 2 (2022, 2023)
- European Championship: 11 (2013, 2014, 2015, 2018, 2019, 2021, 2022, 2023, 2024, 2025, 2026)
- Olympic: 2 (2022, 2026)
- Grand Slam victories: 4 (2022 Masters, 2023 Tour Challenge, 2023 National, 2023 Masters)
Medal record
Men's curling
Representing Italy
World Championships
Bronze medal – third place	2022 Las Vegas
Bronze medal – third place	2024 Schaffhausen
European Championships
Silver medal – second place	2026 Ostrava
Bronze medal – third place	2018 Tallinn
Bronze medal – third place	2021 Lillehammer
Bronze medal – third place	2022 Östersund

Sebastiano Arman (born 17 January 1997) is an Italian curler from Cembra. He has represented Italy at the 2022 and 2026 Winter Olympics.

== Career ==
=== Juniors ===
As a junior curler, Arman represented Italy in three World Junior Curling Championships. He was the alternate for Italy at the 2012 World Junior Curling Championships on a team skipped by Andrea Pilzer, where they finished 9th. Arman would remain as the alternate of the Italian junior team for the 2013 World Junior Curling Championships where they would improve and finish round robin play in 6th place with a 5-4 record.

In his last year in Juniors at the 2014 World Junior Curling Championships, he was elevated to second on the Italian team skipped by Amos Mosaner. There, they would improve their performances in 2012 and 2013, but would just miss the playoffs with 5th-place finish after losing in a tie-breaker to Switzerland's Yannick Schwaller.

=== Mens ===
Arman would begin his men's career being an alternate for the Italian men's team at the 2013, 2014, and 2015 European Curling Championships, as well as the 2015 Ford World Men's Curling Championship. He would later officially join Team Joël Retornaz as their second starting in the 2018–19 curling season. In their first season together, at the 2018 European Curling Championships, they would win the bronze medal game over Germany's Marc Muskatewitz 8–6, winning the country's first medal at the event since 1979. That would qualify them for the 2019 World Men's Curling Championship, where they finished in 7th place. After the 2020 World Men's Curling Championship was canceled due to the pandemic, Team Retornaz represented Italy at the 2021 World Men's Curling Championship in Calgary, Alberta where they finished with a 7–6 record, just missing the playoffs. However, this result would qualify them to represent Italy at the Olympics in 2022, Arman's first. Team Retornaz would finish in 9th place with a 3-6 round robin record.

With Team Retornaz preparing for the 2026 Winter Olympics, in which it would be hosted by their home country of Italy at Cortina d'Ampezzo, they would start to find more success. Notably, they would win 4 Grand Slam of Curling events (the most ever for an Italian team) at the 2022 Masters, 2023 Tour Challenge, 2023 National, and 2023 Masters. They would also win Italy's first medals at the World Men's Curling Championship, with two bronze medals in 2022 and in 2024.

== Personal life ==
In addition to curling, Arman works as a police officer.
