= 2019 World Junior-B Curling Championships (December) =

- Host city: Lohja, Finland
- Arena: Kisakallio Sports Institute
- Dates: December 11–18
- Men's winner: Sweden
- Skip: Daniel Magnusson
- Third: Robin Ahlberg
- Second: Anton Regosa
- Lead: Sebastian Jones
- Alternate: Rasmus Israelsson
- Finalist: Italy (Giacomo Colli)
- Women's winner: Japan
- Skip: Sae Yamamoto
- Fourth: Minori Suzuki
- Third: Eri Ogihara
- Second: Yui Ueno
- Finalist: Latvia (Evelīna Barone)

The 2019 World Junior-B Curling Championships was held from December 11 to 18 at the Kisakallio Sports Institute in Lohja, Finland. The event was held to qualify teams for the 2020 World Junior Curling Championships.

== Men ==
=== Round robin standings ===
Final Round Robin Standings

Key
Teams to Playoffs

Group A	Skip	W	L	W–L	DSC
Japan	Kei Kamada	7	0	–	45.78
Turkey	Oğuzhan Karakurt	5	2	1–1	47.99
South Korea	Lee Jae-beom	5	2	1–1	64.28
Slovenia	Štefan Sever	5	2	1–1	107.12
Netherlands	Tobias van den Hurk	3	4	–	50.26
Poland	Maksym Grzelka	2	5	–	71.38
Spain	Luis Gómez	1	6	–	72.13
Croatia	Sven Princic	0	7	–	157.93

Group B	Skip	W	L	W–L	DSC
Sweden	Daniel Magnusson	7	0	–	49.44
Czech Republic	Adam Podolka	4	3	2–0	82.98
France	Eddy Mercier	4	3	1–1	54.93
Kazakhstan	Azizbek Nadirbayev	4	3	0–2	66.90
Austria	Florian Mavec	3	4	1–0	89.52
Hungary	Lőrinc Tatár	3	4	0–1	58.54
Finland	Jüso Virtäla	2	5	–	95.09
China	Duan Yu	1	6	–	62.38

Group C	Skip	W	L	W–L	DSC
Germany	Sixten Totzek	7	0	–	43.65
Italy	Giacomo Colli	5	2	–	53.86
Denmark	Jonathan Vilandt	4	3	1–0	70.35
Slovakia	Jakub Červenka	4	3	0–1	67.80
England	Jotham Sugden	3	4	1–0	70.30
Latvia	Krišs Vonda	3	4	0–1	68.27
Australia	Jonathan Imlah	1	6	1–0	84.69
Chinese Taipei	Nelson Wang	1	6	0–1	91.39

=== Playoffs ===
Quarterfinals
1	Germany	9
8	South Korea	3
4	Turkey	4
5	Italy	7
2	Japan	2
7	France	3
3	Sweden	8
6	Czech Republic	3

Semifinals
1	Germany	5
5	Italy	9
7	France	1
3	Sweden	9

Gold medal game
5	Italy	5
3	Sweden	6
Third place
1	Germany	5
7	France	4

==== Quarterfinals ====
Tuesday, December 17, 13:30

Sheet A	1	2	3	4	5	6	7	8	Final
Germany (Totzek) 🔨	2	0	3	1	3	0	X	X	9
South Korea (Lee)	0	1	0	0	0	2	X	X	3

Sheet C	1	2	3	4	5	6	7	8	Final
Sweden (Magnusson) 🔨	2	2	3	0	1	0	X	X	8
Czech Republic (Podolka)	0	0	0	1	0	2	X	X	3

Sheet E	1	2	3	4	5	6	7	8	9	Final
Japan (Kamada)	0	0	0	0	1	0	0	1	0	2
France (Mercier) 🔨	0	1	0	0	0	0	1	0	1	3

Sheet F	1	2	3	4	5	6	7	8	Final
Turkey (Karakurt) 🔨	0	1	0	1	0	1	1	0	4
Italy (Colli)	0	0	2	0	4	0	0	1	7

==== Semifinals ====
Wednesday, December 18, 09:00

Sheet A	1	2	3	4	5	6	7	8	Final
France (Mercier)	0	0	0	0	1	0	X	X	1
Sweden (Magnusson) 🔨	1	0	2	2	0	4	X	X	9

Sheet C	1	2	3	4	5	6	7	8	Final
Germany (Totzek) 🔨	0	2	0	2	0	1	0	X	5
Italy (Colli)	3	0	1	0	2	0	3	X	9

==== Bronze medal game ====
Wednesday, December 18, 14:00

Sheet B	1	2	3	4	5	6	7	8	Final
Germany (Totzek) 🔨	2	0	2	0	0	1	0	0	5
France (Mercier)	0	1	0	2	0	0	1	0	4

==== Gold medal game ====
Wednesday, December 18, 14:00

Sheet A	1	2	3	4	5	6	7	8	Final
Italy (Colli) 🔨	1	0	1	1	1	0	1	0	5
Sweden (Magnusson)	0	2	0	0	0	3	0	1	6

== Women ==
=== Round robin standings ===
Final Round Robin Standings

Key
Teams to Playoffs

Group A	Skip	W	L	W–L	DSC
Italy	Stefania Constantini	5	0	–	96.07
United States	Cora Farrell	4	1	–	43.43
Czech Republic	Luisa Klímová	3	2	–	71.33
Turkey	Mihriban Polat	2	3	–	70.87
Austria	Sara Haidinger	1	4	–	157.59
Spain	Maria Gómez	0	5	–	132.09

Group B	Skip	W	L	W–L	DSC
Denmark	Mathilde Halse	6	0	–	85.50
Latvia	Evelīna Barone	5	1	–	71.18
New Zealand	Courtney Smith	3	3	1–0	58.02
Scotland	Lisa Davie	3	3	0–1	64.77
Germany	Lena Kapp	2	4	1–0	50.63
Australia	Tahli Gill	2	4	0–1	112.57
Slovenia	Liza Gregori	0	6	–	106.73

Group C	Skip	W	L	W–L	DSC
Hungary	Linda Joó	5	0	–	74.66
Japan	Sae Yamamoto	4	1	–	85.97
Kazakhstan	Sitora Alliyarova	3	2	–	80.56
Poland	Daria Chmarra	2	3	–	71.73
Finland	Noora Suuripää	1	4	–	120.34
England	Sydney Boyd	0	5	–	115.98

=== Playoffs ===
Quarterfinals
1	Hungary	4
8	Czech Republic	3
4	United States	1
5	Latvia	8
2	Denmark	5
7	New Zealand	4
3	Italy	1
6	Japan	7

Semifinals
1	Hungary	5
5	Latvia	6
2	Denmark	2
6	Japan	3

Gold medal game
5	Latvia	1
6	Japan	7
Third place
1	Hungary	2
2	Denmark	8

==== Quarterfinals ====
Tuesday, December 17, 18:00

Sheet B	1	2	3	4	5	6	7	8	Final
Italy (Constantini)	0	0	1	0	0	0	X	X	1
Japan (Yamamoto) 🔨	0	2	0	1	1	3	X	X	7

Sheet D	1	2	3	4	5	6	7	8	Final
Hungary (Joó)	0	0	0	1	1	0	1	1	4
Czech Republic (Klímová) 🔨	0	1	1	0	0	1	0	0	3

Sheet E	1	2	3	4	5	6	7	8	Final
Denmark (Halse) 🔨	0	0	3	0	0	0	0	2	5
New Zealand (Smith)	1	0	0	1	0	1	1	0	4

Sheet F	1	2	3	4	5	6	7	8	Final
United States (Farrell)	0	0	0	1	0	0	0	X	1
Latvia (Barone) 🔨	3	1	0	0	1	1	2	X	8

==== Semifinals ====
Wednesday, December 18, 09:00

Sheet B	1	2	3	4	5	6	7	8	9	Final
Hungary (Joó) 🔨	1	1	1	0	1	0	1	0	0	5
Latvia (Barone)	0	0	0	1	0	2	0	2	1	6

Sheet D	1	2	3	4	5	6	7	8	Final
Denmark (Halse)	0	0	1	0	0	0	1	0	2
Japan (Yamamoto) 🔨	0	0	0	0	0	1	0	2	3

==== Bronze medal game ====
Wednesday, December 18, 14:00

Sheet B	1	2	3	4	5	6	7	8	Final
Hungary (Joó) 🔨	1	1	0	0	0	0	X	X	2
Denmark (Halse)	0	0	1	1	4	2	X	X	8

==== Gold medal game ====
Wednesday, December 18, 14:00

Sheet A	1	2	3	4	5	6	7	8	Final
Latvia (Barone) 🔨	0	0	1	0	0	0	X	X	1
Japan (Yamamoto)	0	3	0	0	3	1	X	X	7
