= Lithuanian Women's Curling Championship =

The Lithuanian Women's Curling Championship (Lithuanian: Lietuvos kerlingo čempionatas (moterys), Lietuvos moterų kerlingo čempionatas) is the national championship of women's curling in Lithuania. It has been held annually since 2006 and organized by the Lithuanian Curling Association.

Championship is held in conjunction with Lithuanian Men's Curling Championship.

In 2013 championship was "absolute" - for men's, women's and mixed teams.

== List of champions ==
Teams line-up in order: fourth, third, second, lead, alternate, coach; skips marked in bold.

Year	Host city, dates	Champion	Runner-up	Bronze
...
2013	Riga; 8-11 March	Tado Vyskupaičio T-Rink (Vilnius); **Tadas Vyskupaitis**, Vytis Kulakauskas, Vidas Sadauskas, Laurynas Telksnys	Arūno Skrolio DeArch/Polido (Vilnius); **Arūnas Skrolis**, Paulius Kamarauskas, Piotras Gerasimovičius, Gytis Malinauskas	Manto Kulakausko IceProof (Vilnius); **Mantas Kulakauskas**, Konstantin Rykov, Roger Gulka, Viačeslavas Pantelejevas
2014	Riga; 14-16 March	Virginijos Paulauskaitės - MOI (Vilnius); **Virginija Paulauskaitė**, Rūta Norkienė, Olga Dvojeglazova, Jelena Jefimova	Justinos Lenortavičiūtės - NS (Vilnius); **Justina Lenortavičiūtė**, Agnė Valaskevičiūtė, Laurita Stasiūnaitė, Daina Barone (Latvia) , alternates: Giedrė Vilčinskaitė, Rūta Romeikienė, coach: Vygantas Zalieckas	Astos Pukaitės Kajokės - IcyHeads (Kaunas); **Asta Pūkaitė-Kajokė**, Lina Janulevičiūtė, Asta Vaičekonytė, Aurelija Martinkutė
2015	Riga; 12-15 March	Virginijos Paulauskaitės - MOI (Vilnius); **Virginija Paulauskaitė**, Olga Dvojeglazova, Rasa Abelytė, Rasa Lubarte	Justinos Lenortavičiūtės - NS NoStress (Vilnius); **Justina Lenortavičiūtė**, Agnė Valaskevičiūtė, Laurita Stasiūnaitė, Daina Barone (Latvia)	Gaivos Valatkienės - SLYDIS (Kaunas); **Gaiva Valatkienė**, Eglė Čepulytė-Vaitkevičienė, Gražina Eitutienė, Daiga Gaižutienė, coach: Virginija Paulauskaitė
2016	Riga; 10-13 March	Virginijos Paulauskaitės Skipas (Vilnius); **Virginija Paulauskaitė**, Olga Dvojeglazova, Jelena Jefimova, Rasa Abelytė	Astos Vaičekonytės - Icy Heads (Kaunas); **Asta Vaičekonytė**, Lina Janulevičiūtė, Rasa Veronika Jasaitienė, Asta Uldukienė	Agnės Vyskupaitienės NS (Vilnius); **Agnė Vyskupaitienė**, Laurita Stasiūnaitė, Rūta Blažienė, Mintautė Jurkutė
2017	Riga; 23-26 March	Gaivos Valatkienės - Slydis (Kaunas); **Gaiva Valatkienė**, Gražina Eitutienė, Eglė Čepulytė, Jolanta Šulinskienė, alternate: Juventa Kručienė, coach: Virginija Paulauskaitė	Virginijos Paulauskaitės - Skipas (Vilnius); **Virginija Paulauskaitė**, Olga Dvojeglazova, Rasa Abelytė, Jelena Jefimova	Astos Vaičekonytės - Icy Heads (Kaunas); **Asta Vaičekonytė**, Lina Janulevičiūtė, Rasa Veronika Jasaitienė, Asta Uldukienė, alternate: Džeralda Mačiliūnienė
2018	Kaunas; 3-6 May	V. Paulauskaitės - Skipas (Vilnius); **Virginija Paulauskaitė**, Olga Dvojeglazova, Rasa Abelytė, Justina Zalieckienė	A. Vaičekonytės - Icy Heads (Kaunas); **Asta Vaičekonytė**, Lina Janulevičiūtė, Gražina Eitutienė, Džeralda Mačiliūnienė	R. Blažienės (Vilnius); **Rūta Blažienė**, Mintautė Jurkutė, Dovilė Aukštuolytė, Akvilė Rykovė, alternate: Laurita Stasiūnaitė, coach: Konstantin Rykov
2019	Vilnius; 2-5 May	Vaičekonytės - Kaunas CC (Kaunas); **Asta Vaičekonytė**, Lina Janulevičiūtė, Gražina Eitutienė, Akvilė Rykove, coach: Konstantin Rykov	Paulauskaitės komanda (Vilnius); **Virginija Paulauskaitė**, Olga Dvojeglazova, Rūta Blažienė, Dovilė Aukštuolytė	Valatkienės - Slydis (Kaunas); **Gaiva Valatkienė**, Rasa Veronika Jasaitienė, Jolanta Šulinskienė, Eglė Čepulytė
2020	Riga; 11—14 March	only 1st round was played and championship was stopped because of COVID-19 pandemic		
2021	Elektrėnai; 8-11 April	Vord (Vilnius); **Virginija Paulauskaitė**, Olga Dvojeglazova, Dovilė Aukštuolytė, Rūta Blažienė, alternate: Justina Zalieckienė	Kaunas Curling Club (Kaunas); **Asta Vaičekonytė**, Lina Janulevičiūtė, Gražina Eitutienė, Aistė Krasauskaitė, alternate: Nika Shilova, coach: Ansis Regža	Slydis (Kaunas); **Gaiva Valatkienė**, Rasa Veronika Jasaitienė, Jolanta Šulinskienė, Eglė Čepulytė, coach: Arnis Veidemanis
2022	Kaunas; 6—9 May	Vord (Vilnius); **Virginija Paulauskaitė**, Olga Dvojeglazova, Dovilė Aukštuolytė, Rūta Blažienė, alternate: Justina Zalieckienė	Kaunas Curling Club (Kaunas); **Lina Janulevičiūtė**, Gražina Eitutienė, Džeralda Mačiliūnienė, Aistė Krasauskaitė, alternate: Asta Vaičekonytė	Team Rykovė; **Akvilė Rykovė**, Mintautė Jurkutė, Anna Gololobova, Rasa Abelytė
2023	??? 18—21 May	V. Paulauskaitės komanda **Virginija Paulauskaitė**, Olga Dvojeglazova, Rūta Blažienė, Justina Zalieckienė, alternate: Dovilė Aukštuolytė	A. Rykovės komanda **Akvilė Rykovė**, Mintautė Jurkutė, Anna Gololobova, Rasa Abelytė, alternate: Jelena Jefimova, coach: Konstantin Rykov	A. Vaičekonytės komanda **Asta Vaičekonytė**, Lina Janulevičiūtė, Džeralda Mačiliūnienė, Aistė Krasauskaitė, alternate: Urtė Venslavičiūtė, coach: Gražina Eitutienė
2024	??? 23—26 мая	V. Paulauskaitės komanda **Virginija Paulauskaitė**, Olga Dvojeglazova, Rūta Blažienė, Justina Zalieckienė, alternate: Dovilė Aukštuolytė	M.Kiudytės komanda **Miglė Kiudytė**, Nika Shilova, Urtė Venslavičiūtė, Meda Kiudytė, alternate: Vaiva Krasauskaitė, coach: Asta Vaičekonytė	G.Valatkienės komanda Rasa Veronika Jasaitienė, **Gaiva Valatkienė**, Jolanta Šulinskienė, Eglė Čepulytė

== See also ==
- Lithuanian Men's Curling Championship
- Lithuanian Mixed Doubles Curling Championship
