= Justina Zalieckienė =

Lithuanian curler

- Curler ♀

Team
- Curling club: Skipas CC, Vilnius
- Skip: Virginija Paulauskaitė
- Third: Rūta Blažienė
- Second: Miglė Kiudytė
- Lead: Olga Dvojeglazova
- Alternate: Justina Zalieckienė

Curling career
- Member Association: Lithuania
- World Championship: 1 (2025)
- European Championship: 5 (2022, 2023, 2024, 2025, 2026)
Medal record
Curling
Lithuanian Women's Championship
| Gold medal – first place | 2018 Kaunas |
| Gold medal – first place | 2021 Elektrėnai |
| Gold medal – first place | 2022 Kaunas |
| Gold medal – first place | 2023 ... |
| Gold medal – first place | 2024 ... |
| Silver medal – second place | 2014 Riga |
| Silver medal – second place | 2015 Riga |

Justina Zalieckienė (earlier named as Justina Lenortavičiūtė) is a Lithuanian curler.

She is a member of the Lithuanian national women's team, who competed at the World Championship for the first time in 2025.

At the national level, she is a multi-time Lithuanian women's champion curler.

She started curling in 2011.

== Teams and events ==
=== Women's ===
| Season | Skip | Third | Second | Lead | Alternate | Coach | Events |
|---|---|---|---|---|---|---|---|
| 2012–13 | Virginija Paulauskaitė | Giedrė Vilčinskaitė | Justina Lenortavičiūtė | Agnė Valaskevičiūtė | | | LWCC 2013 (4th) |
| 2013–14 | Justina Lenortavičiūtė | Agnė Valaskevičiūtė | Laurita Stasiūnaitė | Daina Barone | Giedrė Vilčinskaitė, Rūta Romeikienė | Vygantas Zalieckas | LWCC 2014 (silver) |
| 2014–15 | Justina Lenortavičiūtė | Agnė Valaskevičiūtė | Laurita Stasiūnaitė | Daina Barone | | | LWCC 2015 (silver) |
| 2016–17 | Justina Zalieckienė | Rūta Blažienė | Mintautė Jurkutė | Justina Dobrodiejūtė | Dovilė Aukštuolytė | | LWCC 2017 (4th) |
| 2017–18 | Virginija Paulauskaitė | Olga Dvojeglazova | Rasa Abelytė | Justina Zalieckienė | | | LWCC 2018 (gold) |
| 2020–21 | Virginija Paulauskaitė | Olga Dvojeglazova | Dovilė Aukštuolytė | Ruta Blaziene | Justina Zalieckienė | | LWCC 2021 (gold) |
| 2021–22 | Virginija Paulauskaitė | Olga Dvojeglazova | Dovilė Aukštuolytė | Ruta Blaziene | Justina Zalieckienė | | LWCC 2022 (gold) |
| 2022–23 | Virginija Paulauskaitė | Olga Dvojeglazova | Ruta Blaziene | Justina Zalieckienė | Dovilė Aukštuolytė | | LWCC 2023 (gold) |
| 2023–24 | Virginija Paulauskaitė | Olga Dvojeglazova | Rūta Blažienė | Justina Zalieckienė | Miglė Kiudytė | Vygantas Zalieckas | ECC-B Group 2023 (12th) |
| 2023–24 | Virginija Paulauskaitė | Olga Dvojeglazova | Ruta Blaziene | Justina Zalieckienė | Dovilė Aukštuolytė | | LWCC 2024 (gold) |
| 2024–25 | Virginija Paulauskaitė | Olga Dvojeglazova | Miglė Kiudytė | Rūta Blažienė | Justina Zalieckienė (WCC) | Egle Cepulyte (ECC, WCC), Vygantas Zalieckas (ECC) | ECC-A Group 2024 (8th); WWCC 2025 (13th) |

=== Mixed ===
| Season | Skip | Third | Second | Lead | Events |
|---|---|---|---|---|---|
| 2014–15 | Tadas Vyskupaitis | Agnė Valaskevičiūtė | Vytis Kulakauskas | Justina Zalieckienė | LMxCC 2015 (5th) |
