= Rūta Blažienė =

Lithuanian curler

- Curler ♀

Team
- Curling club: Skipas CC, Vilnius
- Skip: Virginija Paulauskaitė
- Third: Rūta Blažienė
- Second: Miglė Kiudytė
- Lead: Olga Dvojeglazova
- Alternate: Justina Zalieckienė

Curling career
- Member Association: Lithuania
- World Championship: 1 (2025)
- European Championship: 6 (2021, 2022, 2023, 2024, 2025, 2026)
Medal record
Curling
Lithuanian Women's Championship
Gold medal – first place	2021 Elektrėnai
Gold medal – first place	2022 Kaunas
Gold medal – first place	2023 ...
Gold medal – first place	2024 ...
Silver medal – second place	2019 Vilnius
Bronze medal – third place	2016 Riga
Bronze medal – third place	2018 Kaunas

Rūta Blažienė is a Lithuanian curler.

She is a member of the Lithuanian national women's team, who competed at the World Championship for the first time in 2025.

At the national level, she is a multi-time Lithuanian women's champion curler.

== Teams and events ==
=== Women's ===
Season	Skip	Third	Second	Lead	Alternate	Coach	Events
2015–16	Agnė Vyskupaitienė	Laurita Stasiūnaitė	Ruta Blaziene	Mintautė Jurkutė			LWCC 2016 (bronze)
2016–17	Justina Zalieckienė	Ruta Blaziene	Mintautė Jurkutė	Justina Dobrodiejūtė	Dovilė Aukštuolytė		LWCC 2017 (4th)
2017–18	Ruta Blaziene	Mintautė Jurkutė	Dovilė Aukštuolytė	Akvilė Rykovė	Laurita Stasiūnaitė	Konstantin Rykov	LWCC 2018 (bronze)
2018–19	Virginija Paulauskaitė	Olga Dvojeglazova	Ruta Blaziene	Dovilė Aukštuolytė			LWCC 2019 (silver)
2019–20	Virginija Paulauskaitė	Olga Dvojeglazova	Dovile Aukstuolyte	Ruta Blaziene			
2020–21	Virginija Paulauskaitė	Olga Dvojeglazova	Dovilė Aukštuolytė	Ruta Blaziene	Justina Zalieckienė		LWCC 2021 (gold)
2021–22	Virginija Paulauskaitė	Olga Dvojeglazova	Dovile Aukstuolyte	Ruta Blaziene		Vygantas Zalieckas	ECC-B Group 2021 (15th)
2021–22	Virginija Paulauskaitė	Olga Dvojeglazova	Dovilė Aukštuolytė	Ruta Blaziene	Justina Zalieckienė		LWCC 2022 (gold)
2022–23	Virginija Paulauskaitė	Olga Dvojeglazova	Dovile Aukstuolyte	Ruta Blaziene		Vygantas Zalieckas	ECC-B Group 2022 (13th)
2022–23	Virginija Paulauskaitė	Olga Dvojeglazova	Ruta Blaziene	Justina Zalieckienė	Dovilė Aukštuolytė		LWCC 2023 (gold)
2023–24	Virginija Paulauskaitė	Olga Dvojeglazova	Rūta Blažienė	Justina Zalieckienė	Miglė Kiudytė	Vygantas Zalieckas	ECC-B Group 2023 (12th)
2023–24	Virginija Paulauskaitė	Olga Dvojeglazova	Ruta Blaziene	Justina Zalieckienė	Dovilė Aukštuolytė		LWCC 2024 (gold)
2024–25	Virginija Paulauskaitė	Olga Dvojeglazova	Miglė Kiudytė	Rūta Blažienė	Justina Zalieckienė (WCC)	Egle Cepulyte (ECC, WCC), Vygantas Zalieckas (ECC)	ECC-A Group 2024 (8th); WWCC 2025 (13th)

=== Mixed ===
Season	Skip	Third	Second	Lead	Events
2023–24	Arūnas Skrolis	Rūta Blažienė	Paulius Kamarauskas	Dovilė Aukštuolytė	LMxCC 2024 (4th)

=== Mixed doubles ===
Season	Female	Male	Events
2018–19	Rūta Blažienė	Paulius Kamarauskas	LMDCC 2019 (5th)
