= Miglė Kiudytė =

Lithuanian curler

- Curler ♀

Team
- Curling club: Kaunas Curling Club, Kaunas
- Skip: Virginija Paulauskaitė
- Third: Rūta Blažienė
- Second: Miglė Kiudytė
- Lead: Olga Dvojeglazova
- Alternate: Justina Zalieckienė

Curling career
- Member Association: Lithuania
- World Championship: 1 (2025)
- World Mixed Championship: 1 (2023)
- European Championship: 4 (2023, 2024, 2025, 2026)
Medal record
Curling
Lithuanian Women's Championship
Silver medal – second place	2024 ...

Miglė Kiudytė is a Lithuanian curler from Kaunas.

She is a member of the Lithuanian national women's team, who competed at the World Championship for the first time in 2025.

At the national level, she is Lithuanian women's championship silver medalist.

== Teams and events ==
=== Women's ===
Season	Skip	Third	Second	Lead	Alternate	Coach	Events
2021–22	Miglė Kiudytė	Nika Shilova	Medeinė Karpavičė	Eidvilė Gedeikytė			LWCC 2022 (5th)
2022–23	Miglė Kiudytė	Nika Shilova	Medeinė Karpavičė	Meda Kiudytė	Eidvilė Gedeikytė	Paulius Krauza	LWCC 2023 (4th)
2023–24	Virginija Paulauskaitė	Olga Dvojeglazova	Rūta Blažienė	Justina Zalieckienė	Miglė Kiudytė	Vygantas Zalieckas	ECC-B Group 2023 (12th)
2023–24	Miglė Kiudytė	Nika Shilova	Urtė Venslavičiūtė	Meda Kiudytė	Vaiva Krasauskaitė	Asta Vaičekonytė	LWCC 2024 (silver)
2024–25	Miglė Kiudytė	Nika Shilova	Urte Venslaviciute	Meda Kiudyte		Asta Vaicekonyte	WJBCC 2024 (12th)
2024–25	Virginija Paulauskaitė	Olga Dvojeglazova	Miglė Kiudytė	Rūta Blažienė	Justina Zalieckienė (WCC)	Egle Cepulyte (ECC, WCC), Vygantas Zalieckas (ECC)	ECC-A Group 2024 (8th); WWCC 2025 (13th)

=== Mixed ===
Season	Skip	Third	Second	Lead	Events
2023–24	Paulius Rymeikis	Mintaute Jurkute	Donatas Kiudys	Miglė Kiudytė	WMxCC 2023 (30th)

=== Mixed doubles ===
Season	Female	Male	Coach	Events
2022–23	Miglė Kiudytė	Matas Junevičius	Arnis Veidemanis	LMDCC 2023 (4th)
2023–24	Miglė Kiudytė	Ricardo Schmitz		LMDCC 2024 (6th)
