= Lithuanian Men's Curling Championship =

The Lithuanian Men's Curling Championship (Lithuanian: Lietuvos kerlingo čempionatas (vyrai), Lietuvos vyrų kerlingo čempionatas) is the national championship of men's curling in Lithuania. It has been held annually since 2006 and organized by the Lithuanian Curling Association.

Championship is held in conjunction with Lithuanian Women's Curling Championship.

In 2013 championship was "absolute" - for men's, women's and mixed teams.

== List of champions ==
Teams line-up in order: fourth, third, second, lead, alternate, coach; skips marked in bold.

Year	Host city, dates	Champion	Runner-up	Bronze
...
2013	Riga; 8-11 March	Tado Vyskupaičio T-Rink (Vilnius); **Tadas Vyskupaitis**, Vytis Kulakauskas, Vidas Sadauskas, Laurynas Telksnys	Arūno Skrolio DeArch/Polido (Vilnius); **Arūnas Skrolis**, Paulius Kamarauskas, Piotras Gerasimovičius, Gytis Malinauskas	Manto Kulakausko IceProof (Vilnius); **Mantas Kulakauskas**, Konstantin Rykov, Roger Gulka, Viačeslavas Pantelejevas
2014	Riga; 14-16 March	Manto Kulakausko IceProof (Vilnius); Konstantin Rykov, **Mantas Kulakauskas**, Roger Gulka, Mantas Bielinis	Arūno Skrolio DeArch/Polido (Vilnius); **Arūnas Skrolis**, Juius Tomaševičius, Vytis Kulakauskas, Gytis Malinauskas, запасной: Paulius Kamarauskas	Tado Vyskupaičio T-Rink (Vilnius); **Tadas Vyskupaitis**, Laurynas Telksnys, Vidas Sadauskas, Justas Valaskevičius
2015	Riga; 12-15 March	Tado Vyskupaičio T-Rink (Vilnius); **Tadas Vyskupaitis**, Vytis Kulakauskas, Laurynas Telksnys, Vidas Sadauskas	Manto Kulakausko IceProof (Vilnius); Konstantin Rykov, **Mantas Kulakauskas**, Roger Gulka, Mantas Bielinis, запасной: Andrej Gračiov, тренер: Allen Gulka	Mato Čepulio Baltų Ainiai Kaunas (Kaunas); **Matas Čepulis**, Gelmis Valdavičius, Gustas Valdavičius, Augustas Čėpla, запасной: Povilas Čepulis, тренер: Paulius Krauza
2016	Riga; 10-13 March	Tado Vyskupaičio - T-Rink (Vilnius); **Tadas Vyskupaitis**, Vytis Kulakauskas, Laurynas Telksnys, Vidas Sadauskas, тренер: Allen Gulka	Arūno Skrolio DeArch-Polido (Vilnius); **Arūnas Skrolis**, Paulius Kamarauskas, Paulius Rymeikis, Nerijus Pacevičius, Julius Tomaševičius, тренер: Martynas Norkus	Manto Kulakausko Europola (Vilnius); **Mantas Kulakauskas**, Konstantin Rykov, Mantas Bielinis, Andrej Gračiov, запасной: Rodger Gulka, тренер: Allen Gulka
2017	Riga; 23-26 March	Tado Vyskupaičio - T-Rink (Vilnius); **Tadas Vyskupaitis**, Vytis Kulakauskas, Laurynas Telksnys, Vidas Sadauskas, тренер: Allen Gulka	Povilo Čepulio - Forsarus (Kaunas); **Povilas Čepulis**, Gustas Valdavičius, Matas Čepulis, Augustas Čėpla, запасной: Gelmis Valdavicius, тренер: Paulius Krauza	Pauliaus Rymeikio - Mc Hammer (Vilnius); **Paulius Rymeikis**, Martynas Norkus, Giedrius Rumšys, Mindaugas Balvočius, запасной: Artur Jefimov
2018	Kaunas; 3-6 May	K.Rykovo - Forsarus Boys (Kaunas); **Konstantin Rykov**, Povilas Čepulis, Matas Čepulis, Mantas Bielinis, запасной: Andrej Gračiov	T.Vyskupaičio - T-Rink (Vilnius); **Tadas Vyskupaitis**, Vytis Kulakauskas, Laurynas Telksnys, Vidas Sadauskas, тренер: Allen Gulka	A.Skrolio - De-Arch (Vilnius); **Arūnas Skrolis**, Paulius Kamarauskas, Nerijus Pacevičius, Liutauras Varanavičius, запасной: Andrius Degutis, тренер: Martynas Norkus
2019	Vilnius; 2-5 May	Vyskupaičio - T-Rink (Vilnius); **Tadas Vyskupaitis**, Vytis Kulakauskas, Laurynas Telksnys, Vidas Sadauskas	Rykovo - Forsarus Boys (Kaunas); **Konstantin Rykov**, Matas Čepulis, Povilas Čepulis, Donatas Kiudys, запасной: Mantas Bielinis	DE-arch (Vilnius); **Arūnas Skrolis**, Paulius Kamarauskas, Nerijus Pacevičius, Liutauras Varanavičius, запасной: Piotras Gerasimovič
2020	not held because of COVID-19 pandemic			
2021	Elektrėnai; 8-11 April	De arch - Arena (Vilnius); **Arūnas Skrolis**, —, Nerijus Pacevičius, Laurynas Telksnys	IceProof - Forsarus (Vilnius/Kaunas); **Konstantin Rykov**, Nedas Ivanauskas, Donatas Kiudys, Igor Betenev, запасной: Matas Junevičius	MC Hammer (Vilnius); **Paulius Rymeikis**, Giedrius Rumšys, Mindaugas Balvočius, Andrius Degutis

== See also ==
- Lithuanian Women's Curling Championship
- Lithuanian Mixed Doubles Curling Championship
