= 2025 United States Women's Curling Championship =

- Host city: Duluth, Minnesota
- Arena: Duluth Entertainment Convention Center
- Dates: January 28 – February 2
- Winner: (Minnesota) Team Peterson
- Curling club: St. Paul CC, Saint Paul
- Skip: Tabitha Peterson
- Third: Cory Thiesse
- Second: Tara Peterson
- Lead: Taylor Anderson-Heide
- Alternate: Vicky Persinger
- Coach: Cathy Overton-Clapham
- Finalist: (New Hampshire) Elizabeth Cousins

The 2025 United States Women's Curling Championship was held from January 28 to February 2 at the Duluth Entertainment Convention Center in Duluth, Minnesota. The event was held in conjunction with the 2025 United States Men's Curling Championship. The winning Tabitha Peterson rink represented the United States at the 2025 World Women's Curling Championship at the Uijeongbu Indoor Ice Rink in Uijeongbu, South Korea. The winning team also earned a berth into the 2025 United States Olympic Curling Trials.

== Qualification process ==
The following teams qualified to participate in the 2025 national championship:

Qualification	Berths	Qualifying Team(s)
2024 World Women's Curling Championship representative	1	(Minnesota) Tabitha Peterson
2025 World Junior Curling Championships representative	1	(Minnesota) Allie Giroux
WCF Team Ranking points leaders (September 25, 2024)	2	(Michigan) Delaney Strouse (North Dakota) Christine McMakin
Qualifying Event (St. Paul Cash Spiel)	2	(Minnesota) Courtney Benson (New Hampshire) Elizabeth Cousins
WCF Year-to-date points leaders (December 26, 2024)	2	(Minnesota) Allory Johnson (Minnesota) Kim Rhyme
TOTAL	8	

== Teams ==
The teams are listed as follows:

Skip	Third	Second	Lead	Alternate	Locale
Aileen Geving (Fourth)	Courtney Benson (Skip)	Lexi Daly	Sara Olson	Clare Moores	Duluth, Minnesota
Elizabeth Cousins	Annmarie Dubberstein	Allison Howell	Elizabeth Janiak		Nashua, New Hampshire
Allie Giroux	Tessa Thurlow	Ella Fleming	Savannah Koch	Brooke Giroux	Chaska, Minnesota
Allory Johnson	Gianna Johnson	Morgan Zacher	Bailey Vaydich		Blaine, Minnesota
Christine McMakin	Miranda Scheel	Jenna Burchesky	Rebecca Rodgers		Fargo, North Dakota
Tabitha Peterson	Cory Thiesse	Tara Peterson	Taylor Anderson-Heide	Vicky Persinger	Saint Paul, Minnesota
Cait Flannery (Fourth)	Kim Rhyme (Skip)	Libby Brundage	Katie Rhyme		Minneapolis, Minnesota
Delaney Strouse	Sarah Anderson	Sydney Mullaney	Anne O'Hara		Traverse City, Michigan

== Round robin standings ==
Final Round Robin Standings

Key
Teams to Playoffs
Teams to Tiebreaker

Team	W	L	W–L	PF	PA	EW	EL	BE	SE
(North Dakota) Christine McMakin	6	1	1–0	70	36	35	22	3	15
(Minnesota) Tabitha Peterson	6	1	0–1	57	37	27	25	5	10
(New Hampshire) Elizabeth Cousins	5	2	–	56	53	26	28	5	7
(Minnesota) Courtney Benson	3	4	1–0	49	52	31	32	3	11
(Minnesota) Allory Johnson	3	4	0–1	42	48	29	31	1	10
(Michigan) Delaney Strouse	2	5	1–0	46	63	30	33	0	10
(Minnesota) Kim Rhyme	2	5	0–1	31	47	27	25	2	13
(Minnesota) Allie Giroux	1	6	–	44	59	27	36	4	5

== Round robin results ==
All draw times are listed in Central Time (UTC−06:00).

=== Draw 1 ===
Tuesday, January 28, 9:00 am

Sheet A	1	2	3	4	5	6	7	8	9	10	Final
(Minnesota) Courtney Benson	0	1	0	0	1	2	1	0	1	0	6
(New Hampshire) Elizabeth Cousins	1	0	2	0	0	0	0	3	0	1	7

Sheet B	1	2	3	4	5	6	7	8	9	10	Final
(Minnesota) Kim Rhyme	0	0	1	0	0	1	1	0	1	X	4
(Michigan) Delaney Strouse	4	0	0	2	1	0	0	1	0	X	8

Sheet C	1	2	3	4	5	6	7	8	9	10	11	Final
(Minnesota) Allory Johnson	0	0	2	0	1	0	1	1	0	1	0	6
(North Dakota) Christine McMakin	0	1	0	1	0	1	0	0	3	0	2	8

Sheet D	1	2	3	4	5	6	7	8	9	10	Final
(Minnesota) Allie Giroux	1	0	0	0	1	0	1	0	X	X	3
(Minnesota) Tabitha Peterson	0	2	0	2	0	3	0	2	X	X	9

=== Draw 2 ===
Tuesday, January 28, 7:00 pm

Sheet A	1	2	3	4	5	6	7	8	9	10	Final
(North Dakota) Christine McMakin	1	0	2	2	0	6	0	1	X	X	12
(Michigan) Delaney Strouse	0	1	0	0	3	0	2	0	X	X	6

Sheet B	1	2	3	4	5	6	7	8	9	10	Final
(New Hampshire) Elizabeth Cousins	0	0	0	2	0	2	X	X	X	X	4
(Minnesota) Tabitha Peterson	3	2	6	0	3	0	X	X	X	X	14

Sheet C	1	2	3	4	5	6	7	8	9	10	Final
(Minnesota) Courtney Benson	2	0	0	1	0	4	0	1	1	X	9
(Minnesota) Allie Giroux	0	1	2	0	2	0	1	0	0	X	6

Sheet D	1	2	3	4	5	6	7	8	9	10	Final
(Minnesota) Kim Rhyme	0	1	1	0	1	0	1	0	0	0	4
(Minnesota) Allory Johnson	0	0	0	1	0	1	0	1	2	2	7

=== Draw 3 ===
Wednesday, January 29, 12:00 pm

Sheet A	1	2	3	4	5	6	7	8	9	10	Final
(Minnesota) Allory Johnson	1	0	2	0	0	0	1	0	0	X	4
(Minnesota) Courtney Benson	0	1	0	3	1	1	0	1	1	X	8

Sheet B	1	2	3	4	5	6	7	8	9	10	11	Final
(Michigan) Delaney Strouse	0	0	1	2	0	1	1	1	0	2	1	9
(Minnesota) Allie Giroux	2	1	0	0	2	0	0	0	3	0	0	8

Sheet C	1	2	3	4	5	6	7	8	9	10	Final
(Minnesota) Kim Rhyme	0	0	0	1	0	0	1	0	X	X	2
(Minnesota) Tabitha Peterson	0	1	2	0	0	0	0	5	X	X	8

Sheet D	1	2	3	4	5	6	7	8	9	10	Final
(New Hampshire) Elizabeth Cousins	0	0	0	2	0	2	0	2	0	X	6
(North Dakota) Christine McMakin	0	2	4	0	4	0	1	0	3	X	14

=== Draw 4 ===
Wednesday, January 29, 8:00 pm

Sheet A	1	2	3	4	5	6	7	8	9	10	Final
(Minnesota) Kim Rhyme	2	0	1	0	1	0	0	1	2	X	7
(Minnesota) Allie Giroux	0	2	0	0	0	0	2	0	0	X	4

Sheet B	1	2	3	4	5	6	7	8	9	10	Final
(Minnesota) Allory Johnson	0	0	0	0	1	0	0	X	X	X	1
(New Hampshire) Elizabeth Cousins	0	3	2	2	0	1	3	X	X	X	11

Sheet C	1	2	3	4	5	6	7	8	9	10	Final
(North Dakota) Christine McMakin	4	0	1	2	0	1	1	2	X	X	11
(Minnesota) Courtney Benson	0	3	0	0	2	0	0	0	X	X	5

Sheet D	1	2	3	4	5	6	7	8	9	10	Final
(Minnesota) Tabitha Peterson	0	2	0	2	0	0	1	0	2	1	8
(Michigan) Delaney Strouse	1	0	1	0	1	1	0	2	0	0	6

=== Draw 5 ===
Thursday, January 30, 2:00 pm

Sheet A	1	2	3	4	5	6	7	8	9	10	Final
(Minnesota) Tabitha Peterson	0	0	0	0	1	0	0	0	X	X	1
(North Dakota) Christine McMakin	0	3	1	2	0	0	2	1	X	X	9

Sheet B	1	2	3	4	5	6	7	8	9	10	Final
(Minnesota) Courtney Benson	0	2	1	0	0	0	0	1	0	X	4
(Minnesota) Kim Rhyme	1	0	0	1	1	0	3	0	1	X	7

Sheet C	1	2	3	4	5	6	7	8	9	10	Final
(New Hampshire) Elizabeth Cousins	0	0	0	2	0	0	2	3	0	4	11
(Michigan) Delaney Strouse	0	3	1	0	1	0	0	0	1	0	6

Sheet D	1	2	3	4	5	6	7	8	9	10	Final
(Minnesota) Allory Johnson	1	0	1	1	0	3	0	1	0	1	8
(Minnesota) Allie Giroux	0	1	0	0	1	0	3	0	1	0	6

=== Draw 6 ===
Friday, January 31, 9:00 am

Sheet A	1	2	3	4	5	6	7	8	9	10	Final
(New Hampshire) Elizabeth Cousins	0	0	0	4	1	0	0	2	0	X	7
(Minnesota) Kim Rhyme	0	0	1	0	0	1	1	0	1	X	4

Sheet B	1	2	3	4	5	6	7	8	9	10	Final
(Minnesota) Allie Giroux	0	3	0	2	0	0	0	1	0	3	9
(North Dakota) Christine McMakin	1	0	2	0	2	0	1	0	1	0	7

Sheet C	1	2	3	4	5	6	7	8	9	10	Final
(Minnesota) Tabitha Peterson	0	3	1	0	3	0	0	0	1	1	9
(Minnesota) Allory Johnson	2	0	0	2	0	2	1	0	0	0	7

Sheet D	1	2	3	4	5	6	7	8	9	10	11	Final
(Michigan) Delaney Strouse	1	0	2	3	0	2	0	0	0	1	0	9
(Minnesota) Courtney Benson	0	2	0	0	2	0	2	1	2	0	2	11

=== Draw 7 ===
Friday, January 31, 7:00 pm

Sheet A	1	2	3	4	5	6	7	8	9	10	Final
(Michigan) Delaney Strouse	1	0	1	0	0	0	0	X	X	X	2
(Minnesota) Allory Johnson	0	1	0	2	2	1	3	X	X	X	9

Sheet B	1	2	3	4	5	6	7	8	9	10	Final
(Minnesota) Tabitha Peterson	0	1	2	1	0	0	0	0	3	1	8
(Minnesota) Courtney Benson	3	0	0	0	1	0	1	1	0	0	6

Sheet C	1	2	3	4	5	6	7	8	9	10	Final
(Minnesota) Allie Giroux	1	0	0	1	1	0	3	0	2	0	8
(New Hampshire) Elizabeth Cousins	0	1	2	0	0	4	0	2	0	1	10

Sheet D	1	2	3	4	5	6	7	8	9	10	Final
(North Dakota) Christine McMakin	0	1	2	0	0	4	1	1	X	X	9
(Minnesota) Kim Rhyme	1	0	0	1	1	0	0	0	X	X	3

== Tiebreaker ==
Saturday, February 1, 7:30 am

Sheet A	1	2	3	4	5	6	7	8	9	10	Final
(Minnesota) Courtney Benson	1	0	3	0	1	0	1	0	0	1	7
(Minnesota) Allory Johnson	0	1	0	0	0	2	0	2	0	0	5

== Playoffs ==
Page playoff system
1	(North Dakota) Christine McMakin	6
2	(Minnesota) Tabitha Peterson	11
3	(New Hampshire) Elizabeth Cousins	10
4	(Minnesota) Courtney Benson	4

Semifinal
1	(North Dakota) Christine McMakin	5
3	(New Hampshire) Elizabeth Cousins	6

Final
2	(Minnesota) Tabitha Peterson	7
3	(New Hampshire) Elizabeth Cousins	6

=== 1 vs. 2 ===
Saturday, February 1, 12:00 pm

Sheet D	1	2	3	4	5	6	7	8	9	10	Final
(North Dakota) Christine McMakin	1	0	2	0	0	1	0	2	0	0	6
(Minnesota) Tabitha Peterson	0	2	0	2	0	0	3	0	1	3	11

=== 3 vs. 4 ===
Saturday, February 1, 12:00 pm

Sheet C	1	2	3	4	5	6	7	8	9	10	Final
(New Hampshire) Elizabeth Cousins	1	3	0	0	2	1	0	3	X	X	10
(Minnesota) Courtney Benson	0	0	3	0	0	0	1	0	X	X	4

=== Semifinal ===
Saturday, February 1, 7:00 pm

Sheet D	1	2	3	4	5	6	7	8	9	10	Final
(North Dakota) Christine McMakin	0	0	1	0	2	0	1	0	1	0	5
(New Hampshire) Elizabeth Cousins	0	1	0	2	0	1	0	1	0	1	6

=== Final ===
Sunday, February 2, 4:00 pm

Sheet D	1	2	3	4	5	6	7	8	9	10	11	Final
(Minnesota) Tabitha Peterson	1	0	2	0	2	0	1	0	0	0	1	7
(New Hampshire) Elizabeth Cousins	0	1	0	2	0	1	0	1	0	1	0	6

2025 United States Women's Curling Championship

Tabitha Peterson
5th United States Championship title
