= Selina Witschonke =

Swiss curler (born 1998)

- Curler
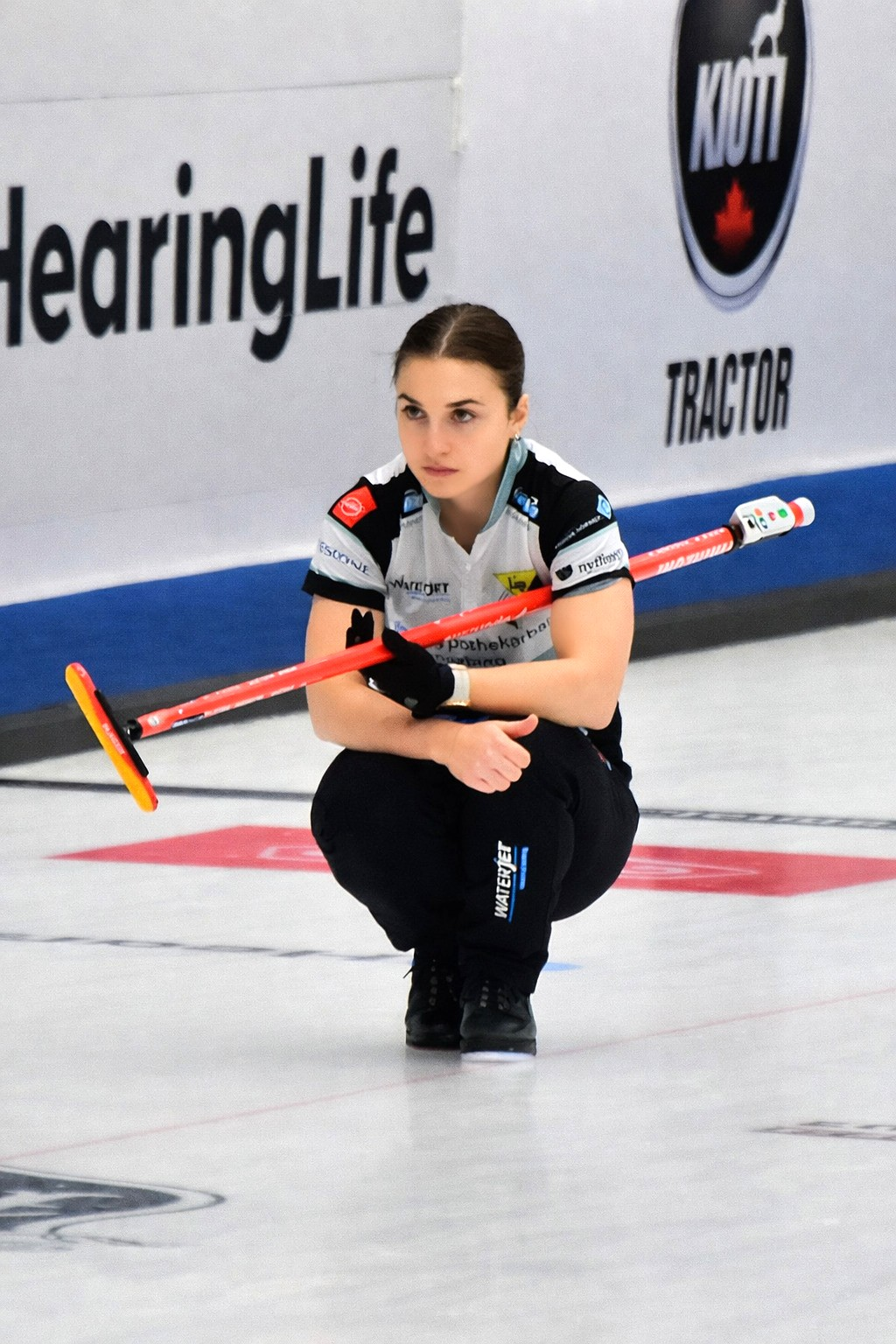
- Witschonke at the 2026 Players' Championship.
- Born: December 17, 1998 (age 27); Samedan, Switzerland

Team
- Curling club: CC3C, Geneva, Switzerland
- Skip: Alina Pätz
- Third: Selina Witschonke
- Second: Stefanie Berset
- Lead: Renée Frigo

Curling career
- Member Association: Switzerland
- World Championship: 2 (2024, 2025)
- European Championship: 3 (2023, 2024, 2026)
- Olympic: 1 (2026)
- Grand Slam victories: 5 (2024 Players', 2025 Players', 2025 Canadian Open, 2026 Players' (Jan.), 2026 National)
Medal record
Women's curling
Representing Switzerland
Olympic Games
Silver medal – second place	2026 Milano Cortina	Team
World Championships
Silver medal – second place	2024 Sydney
Silver medal – second place	2025 Uijeongbu
European Championships
Gold medal – first place	2023 Aberdeen
Gold medal – first place	2024 Lohja
Silver medal – second place	2026 Ostrava
Winter Youth Olympics
Bronze medal – third place	2016 Lillehammer
World Junior Championships
Bronze medal – third place	2019 Liverpool

Selina Witschonke (born December 17, 1998 in Samedan) is a Swiss curler originally from St. Moritz. She currently plays third on Team Alina Pätz. She won the silver medal at 2026 Winter Olympics as the lead of the team skipped by Silvana Tirinzoni.

== Career ==
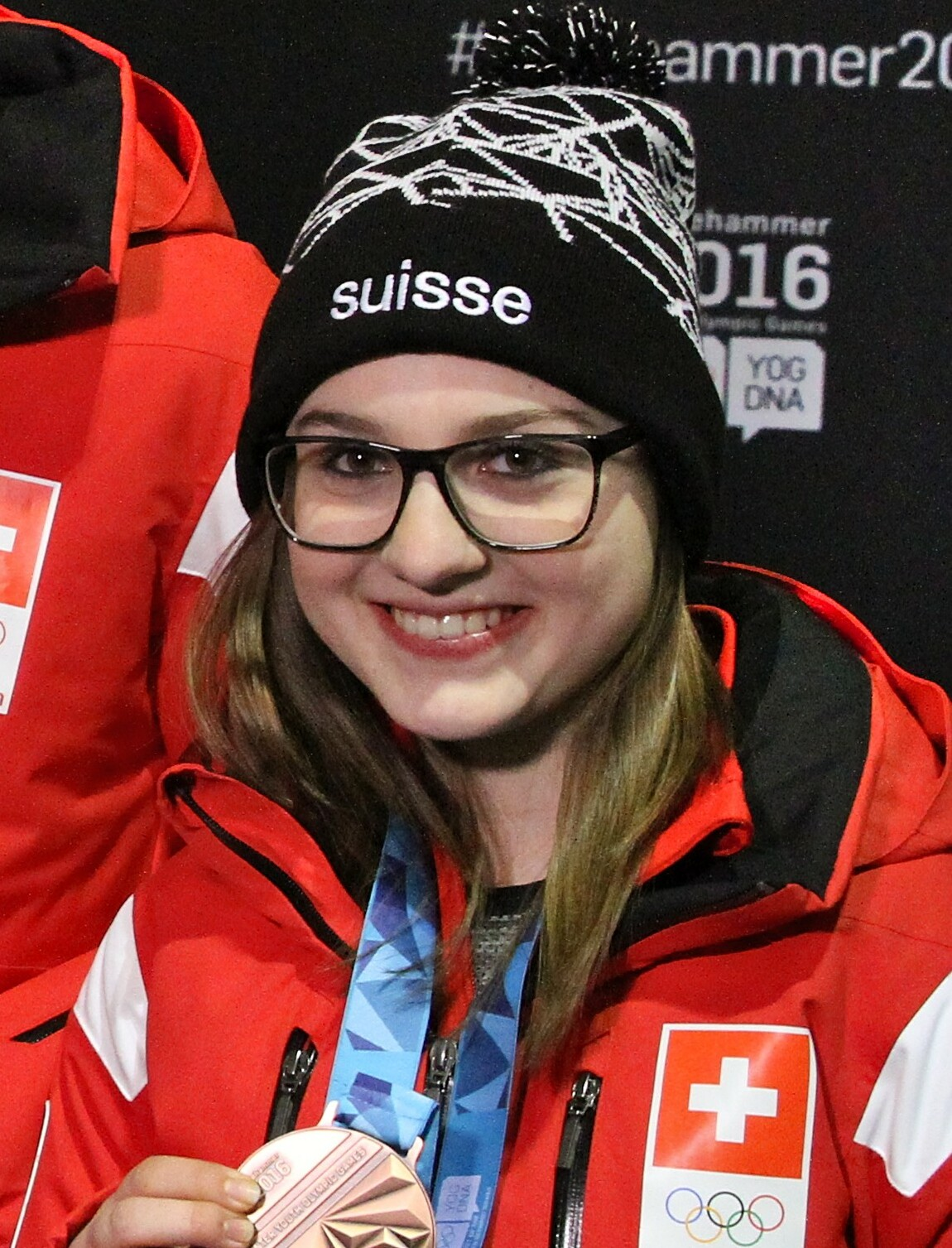
Witschonke at the 2016 Winter Youth Olympics in Lillehammer.

In 2016, Witschonke was named to the Swiss team for the 2016 Winter Youth Olympics in Lillehammer. Through the round robin, she led her team of third Henwy Lochmann, second Laura Engler and lead Philipp Hösli to a 6–1 record, finishing second in their pool. They then beat Sweden's Johan Nygren 7–3 in the quarterfinals before dropping the semifinal 7–5 to Canada's Mary Fay. They won the bronze medal with an 11–3 defeat over Russia's Nadezhda Karelina. In the mixed doubles discipline, Witschonke competed with Estonia's Jarl Guštšin. After winning their first two games, the team lost in the quarterfinals to China's Han Yu and Great Britain's Ross Whyte.

Witschonke represented Switzerland at five consecutive World Junior Curling Championships from 2016 to 2020. In her first appearance, as alternate for the Elena Stern rink, the team missed the playoffs with a 4–5 record. Witschonke played in no games. The next season, she skipped her team to victory at the Swiss junior championship to qualify for the 2017 World Junior Curling Championships. There, her team lost 7–5 in a tiebreaker to South Korea's Kim Min-ji, finishing fifth. In 2018, they also narrowly missed the playoffs, again going 4–5 through the round robin and finishing seventh.

The 2019 World Junior Curling Championships was a breakthrough event for the Swiss team. They added Raphaela Keiser to their team at third who took over skipping duties, shifting Witschonke to fourth. Through the round robin, the team finished third overall with a 6–3 record, qualifying for the playoffs for the first time. After losing 8–2 in the semifinal against Canada's Selena Sturmay, the team rebounded in the bronze medal game by stealing two in the tenth end to upend China's Jiang Jiayi 6–4 and secure Switzerland's first women's world junior medal since 2015. In her last year of eligibility, Witschonke led the Swiss team to another 4–5 record, placing fifth.

While also competing in juniors, Witschonke and her team of Elena Mathis, Marina Lörtscher and Anna Gut also competed on tour during the 2019–20 season. As a junior team, the team was able to find success at the Paf Masters, advancing to the semifinals and the Schweizer Cup where they finished fourth. The following season, aged out of juniors, Raphaela Keiser rejoined the team at second but once again took over as skip. This shifted Witschonke to fourth, with Mathis playing third, Lörtscher at lead and Gut to alternate. Due to the COVID-19 pandemic, there were a limited number of events during the season, however, the team was able to find success in the two tour events they did play in. After another fourth-place finish in the Schweizer Cup, Team Keiser competed in the 2020 Women's Masters Basel. After a 2–1 round robin record, the team won 6–5 over Corrie Hürlimann in the quarterfinals and then upset Elena Stern 9–4 in the semifinals. They couldn't keep their momentum going into the final, however, losing 8–2 to Sweden's Anna Hasselborg. At the 2021 Swiss Women's Curling Championship, they finished 3–6 through the round robin. They were, however, able to defeat Irene Schori 5–2 to win the bronze medal.

Team Keiser began the 2021–22 season at the 2021 Euro Super Series where they went 2–3, missing the playoffs. They then finished fourth at the Saint Petersburg Classic, losing 7–4 to Scotland's Eve Muirhead. At the 2021 Women's Masters Basel, the team went 4–0 through the round robin before dropping the quarterfinal 8–7 to eventual champions Denmark's Madeleine Dupont. Team Keiser had three semifinal finishes in a row at the Alberta Curling Series Thistle, Camrose, and the St. Galler Elite Challenge. In January 2022, they won their first tour event when they defeated Germany's Daniela Jentsch 5–2 in the final of the International Bernese Ladies Cup. In February 2022, the team competed in the 2022 Swiss Women's Curling Championship for the opportunity to represent Switzerland at the 2022 World Women's Curling Championship. Through the first round, the team finished on top of the standings with a 4–1 record. They then went 2–1 through the second round, advancing to the best-of-three final against the two-time defending world champions Team Silvana Tirinzoni. After dropping the first game 10–4, Team Keiser won 5–3 to force a third game. There, Team Tirinzoni won 8–4 to secure the Swiss title, and later went on to win their third world championship title.

The following season, the Keiser rink began with a semifinal finish at the 2022 Euro Super Series. On tour, they reached the final of the 2022 Alberta Curling Series Major and the quarterfinals of the 2022 Saville Shoot-Out. The team won their second tour event by going undefeated to claim the 2022 Women's Masters Basel in September 2022. Due to their strong results early in the season, Team Keiser qualified for the 2022 National Grand Slam of Curling event. Playing without third Elena Mathis who was out due to illness, Witschonke, Keiser, and Lörtscher finished 3–1 through the round robin to qualify directly for the playoffs. This included upset victories over Kaitlyn Lawes, Gim Eun-ji, and Tabitha Peterson. In the quarterfinals, they fell 6–2 to Kerri Einarson. The team also competed in the next three Slams of the season, the 2022 Tour Challenge, 2022 Masters and the 2023 Canadian Open. At the Tour Challenge, the team started with two straight losses, but then beat Chelsea Carey and Tabitha Peterson to get into a tiebreaker which they lost 4–2 to Gim Eun-ji. After a winless showing at the Masters, the team just missed the playoffs at the Canadian Open, going 2–3. They were, however, able to defeat Swiss rivals Team Tirinzoni 4–3 in a C event elimination game. At the 2023 International Bernese Ladies Cup, the team continued their strong play with another semifinal showing. Despite their successful season, they had a disappointing showing at the Swiss Championship. After a 4–4 round robin record, they lost 9–4 in the semifinal to Corrie Hürlimann. Following the season, the team announced they would be parting ways. On April 5, 2023, Team Michèle Jäggi announced that Witschonke would be joining them as their new third with Irene Schori retiring. A month later, however, Team Tirinzoni announced that Briar Schwaller-Hürlimann was removed from the team for "team harmony" reasons. Days later, it was announced that Witschonke was replacing Schwaller-Hürlimann as the team's second.

To begin the 2023–24 season, Team Tirinzoni won 14 straight games in their first two events to claim the 2023 Women's Masters Basel and the 2023 AMJ Campbell Shorty Jenkins Classic, going an undefeated 7–0 at both. They then reached the quarterfinals of the 2023 Players Open where they lost to Kim Eun-jung. At the first Slam of the season, the 2023 Tour Challenge, the team had an undefeated record through the round robin before losing 7–4 in the quarterfinals to Jennifer Jones. They bounced back immediately with another undefeated run to win the Stu Sells 1824 Halifax Classic, their third title of the season. At the 2023 National, the team had another playoff appearance but lost in the semifinals to Korea's Gim Eun-ji. In November 2023, Team Tirinzoni won the gold medal at the 2023 European Curling Championships, finishing a perfect 11–0 through the event. In the final, they defeated Italy's Stefania Constantini 6–5 after a perfect hit-and-roll to the button on Pätz' final shot. They then lost in the quarterfinals of the 2023 Western Showdown to Isabella Wranå. At the next two Slams, the 2023 Masters and the 2024 Canadian Open, the team made two straight finals where they lost to Rachel Homan on both occasions. In the latter, they lost on an extra end steal after Pätz' draw went too far. They followed this with a quarterfinal finish at the 2024 International Bernese Ladies Cup, dropping a 4–3 decision to the Xenia Schwaller junior rink. Despite already being selected for the 2024 World Women's Curling Championship, Team Tirinzoni won the Swiss Women's Championship in February by defeating Team Schwaller in the final. At the World Championship, the team finished the round robin in second place overall with a 10–2 record after losses to Canada's Homan and Scotland's Rebecca Morrison. After beating Italy's Constantini in the semifinal, they faced off against Team Homan again in the final. After controlling most of the first half of the game, the Swiss rink led 5–4 in the ninth end. On her last rock, Homan made a split of a rock in the 12-foot to score three, giving the Canadians a 7–5 lead. Team Tirinzoni then conceded the game in the tenth after deciding they didn't have a shot to tie the game. They ended the season on a positive note, however, as at the 2024 Players' Championship they beat the Homan rink in the semifinals before defeating Team Wranå 6–5 in the final with Witschonke claiming her first career Slam title.

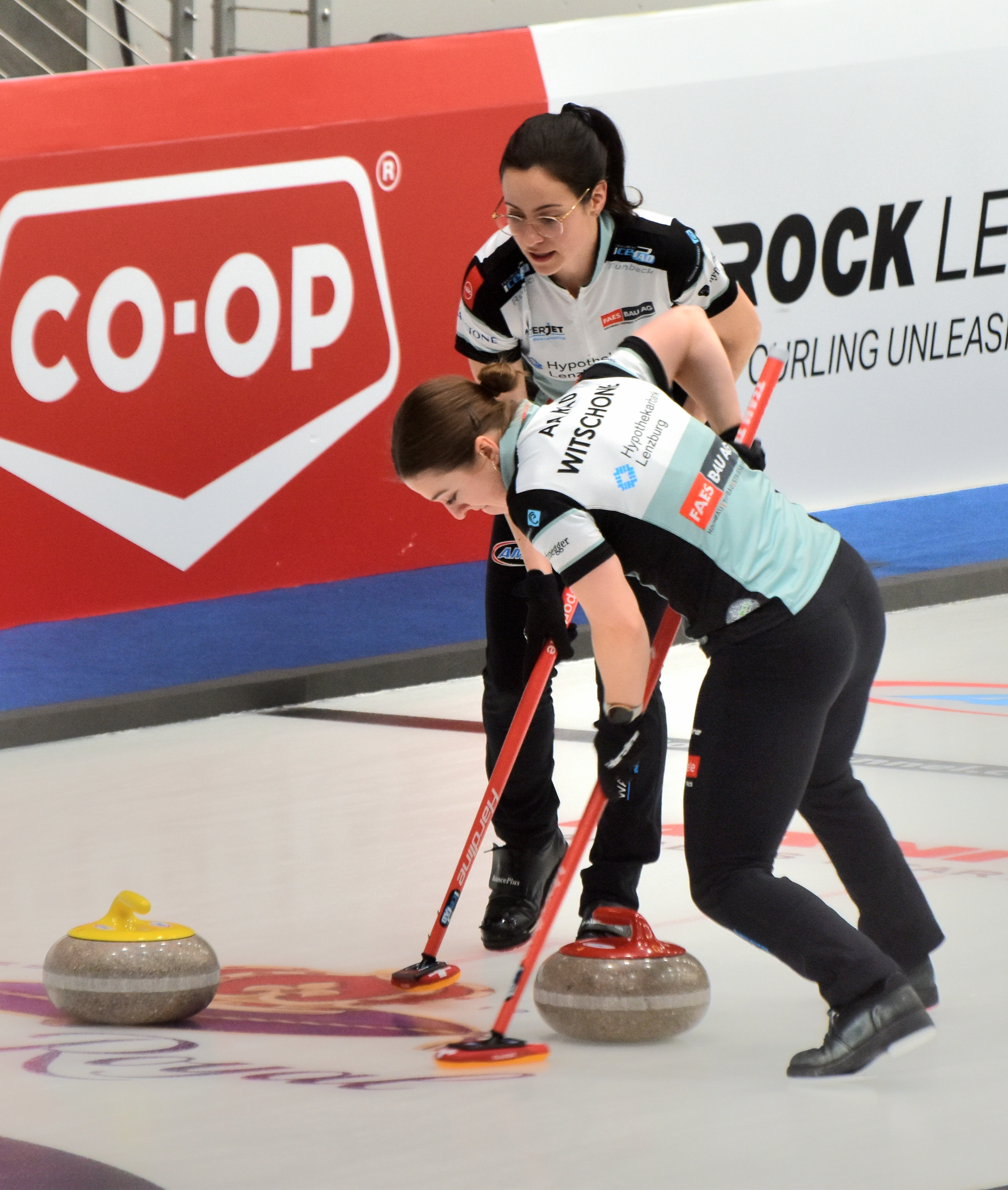
Witschonke sweeps a rock at the 2026 Players' Championship.

Team Tirinzoni kicked off the 2024–25 season by finishing runner-up to Team Homan at the 2024 AMJ Campbell Shorty Jenkins Classic. They then played in the 2024 Women's Masters Basel where they defended their title, defeating Anna Hasselborg in the final. After failing to qualify at the 2024 Tour Challenge, they had an undefeated run at the 2024 Stu Sells Toronto Tankard up until the final where they lost to Kim Eun-jung. At the Swiss European Qualifier, they easily beat the Xenia Schwaller rink 4–0 in the best-of-seven series, securing their spot at the 2024 European Curling Championships. Before the Euros, they reached the final of the 2024 Canadian Open Slam, dropping a 7–5 decision to the Homan rink. They bounced back with a dominant performance at the Europeans, again winning all 11 of their games to secure the title. At the next two Slams, the 2024 National and the 2025 Masters, they lost in a tiebreaker and quarterfinal to Ha Seung-youn and Rachel Homan respectively. They rebounded again at the 2025 International Bernese Ladies Cup, however, claiming their third championship of the season. The following month, they went undefeated at the Swiss Championship until the playoffs where they lost both the 1 vs. 2 game and the semifinal. This third-place finish meant they would not qualify as the Swiss representatives for the 2025 European Curling Championships the following season, despite being two-time defending champions. Still, they represented the country at the 2025 World Women's Curling Championship where they went 11–1 in the round robin, only losing to Canada. After beating China's Wang Rui in the semifinal, they lost in the final for a second straight year to Team Homan, settling for silver. Despite losing the previous five meetings, Team Tirinzoni beat Team Homan 5–4 in the final of the 2025 Players' Championship to end the season.

== Personal life ==
Witschonke was born in Samedan in the Engadin region, and later moved to Lucerne. She began curling when she was seven years old. She currently lives in Sempach and is a sports management student.

== Grand Slam record ==
Key
C	Champion
F	Lost in Final
SF	Lost in Semifinal
QF	Lost in Quarterfinals
R16	Lost in the round of 16
Q	Did not advance to playoffs
T2	Played in Tier 2 event
DNP	Did not participate in event
N/A	Not a Grand Slam event that season

Event	2022–23	2023–24	2024–25	2025–26	2026–27
Invitational	Q	QF	Q	F	QF
Masters	Q	F	QF	F	QF
National	QF	SF	Q	F	C
Open	Q	F	F	C	
Players'	DNP	C	C	C	

== Teams ==
Season	Skip	Third	Second	Lead	Alternate
2014–15	Selina Witschonke	Melina Bezzola	Anna Gut	Larissa Schmid	Elena Mathis
2015–16	Selina Witschonke	Elena Mathis	Melina Bezzola	Anna Gut	Larissa Schmid
2016–17	Selina Witschonke	Elena Mathis	Melina Bezzola	Anna Gut	Laura Engler (WJCC)
2017–18	Selina Witschonke	Elena Mathis	Melina Bezzola	Anna Gut	Laura Engler (WJCC)
2018–19	Selina Witschonke (Fourth)	Raphaela Keiser (Skip)	Laura Engler	Vanessa Tonoli	Nehia Meier (WJCC)
2019–20	Selina Witschonke	Elena Mathis	Marina Lörtscher	Anna Gut	Sarah Müller (WJCC)
2020–21	Selina Witschonke (Fourth)	Elena Mathis	Raphaela Keiser (Skip)	Marina Lörtscher	
2021–22	Selina Witschonke (Fourth)	Elena Mathis	Raphaela Keiser (Skip)	Marina Lörtscher	
2022–23	Selina Witschonke (Fourth)	Elena Mathis	Raphaela Keiser (Skip)	Marina Lörtscher	
2023–24	Alina Pätz (Fourth)	Silvana Tirinzoni (Skip)	Selina Witschonke	Carole Howald	Stefanie Berset (ECC, WCC)
2024–25	Alina Pätz (Fourth)	Silvana Tirinzoni (Skip)	Carole Howald	Selina Witschonke	Stefanie Berset (ECC, WCC)
2025–26	Alina Pätz (Fourth)	Silvana Tirinzoni (Skip)	Carole Howald	Selina Witschonke	Stefanie Berset (OG)
2026–27	Alina Pätz	Selina Witschonke	Stefanie Berset	Renée Frigo	Nadine Bärtschiger (ECC)
