= 2026 European Curling Championships =

Competition in Czech Republic

2026 Le Gruyère AOP European Curling Championships
- Host city: Ostrava, Czech Republic
- Arena: RT Torax Arena
- Dates: October 27 – November 1
- Men's winner: Scotland
- Curling club: The Peak, Stirling
- Skip: Grant Hardie
- Fourth: Ross Whyte
- Second: Craig Waddell
- Lead: Euan Kyle
- Alternate: Duncan Menzies
- Coach: Alistair Scott
- Finalist: Italy (Spiller)
- Women's winner: Sweden
- Curling club: Sundbybergs CK, Sundbyberg
- Skip: Isabella Wranå
- Third: Almida de Val
- Second: Moa Dryburgh
- Lead: Maria Larsson
- Alternate: Linda Stenlund
- Coach: Vincent Stenberg
- Finalist: Switzerland (Pätz)

RT Torax Arena during men's final

The 2026 Le Gruyère AOP European Curling Championships was held from October 27 to November 1 at the RT Torax Arena in Ostrava, Czech Republic.

As a part of the 2026–2030 Olympic cycle restructuring, the event was no longer a qualifier to the World Championships and was instead a standalone event. As a part of this restructuring the B–Division and C–Division were eliminated. Originally ten teams of each gender were going to compete, but this was later expanded to twelve teams. The championships featured eight-end games and two six-team round-robin groups per gender, with the top two teams from each group advancing to the playoffs.

== Medallists ==
	Gold	Silver	Bronze
Men	Scotland; Ross Whyte (Fourth); Grant Hardie (Skip); Craig Waddell; Euan Kyle; Duncan Menzies	Italy; Stefano Spiller; Amos Mosaner; Sebastiano Arman; Cesare Spiller	Sweden; Oskar Eriksson; Rasmus Wranå; Simon Olofsson; Christoffer Sundgren; Alexander Lindström
Women	Sweden; Isabella Wranå; Almida de Val; Moa Dryburgh; Maria Larsson; Linda Stenlund	Switzerland; Alina Pätz; Selina Witschonke; Stefanie Berset; Renée Frigo; Nadine Bärtschiger	Latvia; Evelīna Barone; Rēzija Ieviņa; Katrīna Gaidule; Betija Gulbe; Daina Barone

Team Scotland with the trophy

Women's tournament medalists

== Men ==
=== Qualification ===
The following nations qualified to participate in the 2026 European Curling Championship:

Event	Vacancies	Qualified
2025 European Curling Championships A Division	8	Sweden; Switzerland; Scotland; Italy; Germany; Czech Republic; Poland; Norway
2025 European Curling Championships B Division	2	Belgium; Spain
World Rankings	2	Netherlands; Austria
TOTAL	12	

=== Teams ===
The teams were as follows:

Austria	Belgium	Czech Republic	Germany
Fourth: Mathias Genner; Skip: Jonas Backofen; Second: Matthäus Hofer; Lead: Florian Mavec; Alternate: Marin Reichel	Fourth: Jeroen Spruyt; Skip: Timothy Verreycken; Second: Tuur Vermeiren; Lead: Tom Goethals; Alternate: Dirk Heylen	Skip: Lukáš Klíma; Third: Vít Chabičovský; Second: Martin Jurík; Lead: Lukáš Klípa; Alternate: Marek Černovský	Skip: Benjamin Kapp; Third: Felix Messenzehl; Second: Johannes Scheuerl; Lead: Mario Trevisiol
Italy	Netherlands	Norway	Poland
Skip: Stefano Spiller; Third: Amos Mosaner; Second: Sebastiano Arman; Lead: Cesare Spiller	Skip: Wouter Gösgens; Third: Laurens Hoekman; Second: Simon Spits; Lead: Hessel Janssens; Alternate: Jaap van Dorp	Skip: Magnus Ramsfjell; Third: Steffen Walstad; Second: Bendik Ramsfjell; Lead: Mathias Brænden; Alternate: Thomas Løvold	Skip: Konrad Stych; Third: Krzysztof Domin; Second: Marcin Ciemiński; Lead: Bartosz Łobaza; Alternate: Maksym Grzelka
Scotland	Spain	Sweden	Switzerland
Fourth: Ross Whyte; Skip: Grant Hardie; Second: Craig Waddell; Lead: Euan Kyle; Alternate: Duncan Menzies	Skip: Sergio Vez; Third: Mikel Unanue; Second: Eduardo de Paz; Lead: Nicholas Shaw; Alternate: Luis Gómez	Skip: Oskar Eriksson; Third: Rasmus Wranå; Second: Simon Olofsson; Lead: Christoffer Sundgren; Alternate: Alexander Lindström	Fourth: Philipp Hösli; Skip: Marco Hösli; Second: Simon Gloor; Lead: Justin Hausherr; Alternate: Jonas Feierabend

=== Round robin standings ===
Final Round Robin Standings

Key
Teams to Playoffs

Group A	Skip	W	L	W–L	PF	PA	EW	EL	BE	SE	S%	DSC
Italy	Stefano Spiller	4	1	1–0	37	26	20	15	0	4	83.3%	27.156
Scotland	Grant Hardie	4	1	0–1	39	18	17	12	4	3	88.5%	22.522
Netherlands	Wouter Gösgens	3	2	–	26	23	17	15	1	5	81.3%	35.744
Germany	Benjamin Kapp	2	3	–	25	28	14	19	1	2	80.2%	33.300
Austria	Jonas Backofen	1	4	1–0	26	34	15	16	3	4	77.4%	42.644
Belgium	Timothy Verreycken	1	4	0–1	18	42	14	20	0	1	71.5%	32.333

Group B	Skip	W	L	W–L	PF	PA	EW	EL	BE	SE	S%	DSC
Sweden	Oskar Eriksson	5	0	–	43	19	22	13	2	9	88.2%	18.922
Czech Republic	Lukáš Klíma	3	2	–	39	31	17	20	1	4	80.8%	38.711
Norway	Magnus Ramsfjell	2	3	2–0	29	35	17	21	0	3	81.0%	25.511
Switzerland	Marco Hösli	2	3	1–1	35	27	20	16	0	8	84.8%	37.022
Spain	Sergio Vez	2	3	0–2	24	40	16	17	0	6	71.7%	62.511
Poland	Konrad Stych	1	4	–	18	36	13	18	2	5	75.9%	35.022

Group A Round Robin Summary Table
Pos.	Country	Austria	Belgium	Germany	Italy	Netherlands	Scotland	Record
5	Austria	—	10–2	5–8	5–9	3–5	3–10	1–4
6	Belgium	2–10	—	6–4	7–10	1–9	2–9	1–4
4	Germany	8–5	4–6	—	7–4	3–6	3–7	2–3
1	Italy	9–5	10–7	4–7	—	8–2	6–5	4–1
3	Netherlands	5–3	9–1	6–3	2–8	—	4–8	3–2
2	Scotland	10–3	9–2	7–3	5–6	8–4	—	4–1

Group B Round Robin Summary Table
Pos.	Country	Czech Republic	Norway	Poland	Spain	Sweden	Switzerland	Record
2	Czech Republic	—	7–3	12–5	4–8	7–8	9–7	3–2
3	Norway	3–7	—	3–6	8–6	5–9	10–7	2–3
6	Poland	5–12	6–3	—	3–8	2–7	2–6	1–4
5	Spain	8–4	6–8	8–3	—	1–14	1–11	1–3
1	Sweden	8–7	9–5	7–2	14–1	—	5–4	5–0
4	Switzerland	7–9	7–10	6–2	11–1	4–5	—	2–3

=== Round robin results ===
All draw times are listed in Central European Time (UTC+01:00).

==== Draw 2 ====
Wednesday, October 28, 8:30

Sheet A	1	2	3	4	5	6	7	8	Final
Austria (Backofen)	2	0	2	0	2	1	3	X	10
Belgium (Verreycken) 🔨	0	1	0	1	0	0	0	X	2

Sheet B	1	2	3	4	5	6	7	8	Final
Italy (Spiller)	1	1	0	1	0	1	0	X	4
Germany (Kapp) 🔨	0	0	1	0	2	0	4	X	7

Sheet D	1	2	3	4	5	6	7	8	Final
Sweden (Eriksson)	1	1	2	0	0	0	2	3	9
Norway (Ramsfjell) 🔨	0	0	0	3	1	1	0	0	5

Sheet E	1	2	3	4	5	6	7	8	Final
Scotland (Hardie) 🔨	2	0	3	0	1	0	2	X	8
Netherlands (Gösgens)	0	1	0	1	0	2	0	X	4

==== Draw 3 ====
Wednesday, October 28, 12:00

Sheet A	1	2	3	4	5	6	7	8	Final
Poland (Stych) 🔨	2	0	1	0	0	2	X	X	5
Czech Republic (Klíma)	0	2	0	6	4	0	X	X	12

Sheet C	1	2	3	4	5	6	7	8	Final
Spain (Vez)	0	0	0	0	1	0	X	X	1
Switzerland (Hösli) 🔨	4	1	2	2	0	2	X	X	11

==== Draw 4 ====
Wednesday, October 28, 15:30

Sheet D	1	2	3	4	5	6	7	8	Final
Belgium (Verreycken)	0	0	1	0	1	0	X	X	2
Scotland (Hardie) 🔨	2	5	0	1	0	1	X	X	9

Sheet E	1	2	3	4	5	6	7	8	Final
Austria (Backofen)	0	2	0	2	0	1	0	X	5
Italy (Spiller) 🔨	1	0	2	0	3	0	3	X	9

==== Draw 5 ====
Wednesday, October 28, 19:00

Sheet B	1	2	3	4	5	6	7	8	Final
Sweden (Eriksson) 🔨	0	3	3	3	0	5	X	X	14
Spain (Vez)	0	0	0	0	1	0	X	X	1

Sheet C	1	2	3	4	5	6	7	8	Final
Germany (Kapp)	0	0	1	1	0	1	0	X	3
Netherlands (Gösgens) 🔨	1	2	0	0	2	0	1	X	6

Sheet D	1	2	3	4	5	6	7	8	Final
Czech Republic (Klíma) 🔨	3	0	3	0	1	2	0	0	9
Switzerland (Hösli)	0	3	0	1	0	0	2	1	7

Sheet E	1	2	3	4	5	6	7	8	Final
Norway (Ramsfjell)	0	0	0	0	2	0	0	1	3
Poland (Stych) 🔨	0	1	1	1	0	2	1	0	6

==== Draw 7 ====
Thursday, October 29, 14:00

Sheet A	1	2	3	4	5	6	7	8	Final
Germany (Kapp)	0	0	0	0	3	0	0	X	3
Scotland (Hardie) 🔨	0	0	2	0	0	4	1	X	7

Sheet B	1	2	3	4	5	6	7	8	Final
Netherlands (Gösgens)	0	0	1	0	0	3	0	1	5
Austria (Backofen) 🔨	0	0	0	1	0	0	2	0	3

Sheet D	1	2	3	4	5	6	7	8	Final
Italy (Spiller)	0	2	0	5	0	3	0	X	10
Belgium (Verreycken) 🔨	2	0	1	0	2	0	2	X	7

Sheet E	1	2	3	4	5	6	7	8	Final
Poland (Stych) 🔨	0	2	0	0	0	1	0	X	3
Spain (Vez)	3	0	2	1	1	0	1	X	8

Sheet F	1	2	3	4	5	6	7	8	Final
Switzerland (Hösli)	0	0	2	0	1	0	1	0	4
Sweden (Eriksson) 🔨	1	1	0	1	0	1	0	1	5

==== Draw 8 ====
Thursday, October 29, 18:30

Sheet B	1	2	3	4	5	6	7	8	Final
Norway (Ramsfjell) 🔨	1	0	0	1	0	1	0	0	3
Czech Republic (Klíma)	0	1	0	0	1	0	3	2	7

==== Draw 9 ====
Friday, October 30, 9:30

Sheet C	1	2	3	4	5	6	7	8	Final
Scotland (Hardie)	0	0	2	0	4	4	X	X	10
Austria (Backofen) 🔨	0	2	0	1	0	0	X	X	3

Sheet D	1	2	3	4	5	6	7	8	Final
Netherlands (Gösgens)	0	1	0	0	1	0	0	X	2
Italy (Spiller) 🔨	2	0	2	1	0	1	2	X	8

Sheet E	1	2	3	4	5	6	7	8	Final
Belgium (Verreycken) 🔨	1	0	1	1	0	2	0	1	6
Germany (Kapp)	0	2	0	0	1	0	1	0	4

==== Draw 10 ====
Friday, October 30, 14:00

Sheet A	1	2	3	4	5	6	7	8	Final
Spain (Vez) 🔨	1	0	1	0	3	0	1	0	6
Norway (Ramsfjell)	0	3	0	2	0	1	0	2	8

Sheet B	1	2	3	4	5	6	7	8	Final
Poland (Stych)	2	0	0	0	0	0	0	X	2
Switzerland (Hösli) 🔨	0	2	0	1	1	1	1	X	6

Sheet C	1	2	3	4	5	6	7	8	9	Final
Czech Republic (Klíma)	1	0	2	0	0	1	0	3	0	7
Sweden (Eriksson) 🔨	0	1	0	2	1	0	3	0	1	8

==== Draw 11 ====
Friday, October 30, 18:30

Sheet A	1	2	3	4	5	6	7	8	Final
Belgium (Verreycken)	0	0	0	0	1	0	X	X	1
Netherlands (Gösgens) 🔨	1	1	4	1	0	2	X	X	9

==== Draw 12 ====
Saturday, October 31, 9:30

Sheet A	1	2	3	4	5	6	7	8	Final
Sweden (Eriksson) 🔨	2	2	0	0	0	3	X	X	7
Poland (Stych)	0	0	1	1	0	0	X	X	2

Sheet B	1	2	3	4	5	6	7	8	9	Final
Scotland (Hardie)	0	2	0	0	0	2	0	1	0	5
Italy (Spiller) 🔨	2	0	0	1	0	0	2	0	1	6

Sheet C	1	2	3	4	5	6	7	8	Final
Switzerland (Hösli)	0	2	0	3	0	0	2	0	7
Norway (Ramsfjell) 🔨	1	0	2	0	3	2	0	2	10

Sheet D	1	2	3	4	5	6	7	8	Final
Austria (Backofen)	0	0	1	1	0	3	0	X	5
Germany (Kapp) 🔨	3	3	0	0	1	0	1	X	8

Sheet E	1	2	3	4	5	6	7	8	Final
Spain (Vez)	0	1	2	0	3	1	1	X	8
Czech Republic (Klíma) 🔨	1	0	0	3	0	0	0	X	4

=== Playoffs ===
Semifinals
A1	Italy	7
B2	Czech Republic	5
B1	Sweden	5
A2	Scotland	7

Gold medal game
A1	Italy	5
A2	Scotland	6
Bronze medal game
B2	Czech Republic	4
B1	Sweden	6

==== Semifinals ====
Saturday, October 31, 18:30

Sheet B	1	2	3	4	5	6	7	8	Final
Italy (Spiller) 🔨	2	0	1	0	0	3	0	1	7
Czech Republic (Klíma)	0	2	0	0	1	0	2	0	5

Player percentages
Italy		Czech Republic	
Cesare Spiller	94%	Lukáš Klípa	80%
Sebastiano Arman	69%	Martin Jurík	73%
Amos Mosaner	86%	Vít Chabičovský	78%
Stefano Spiller	80%	Lukáš Klíma	67%
Total	82%	Total	75%

Sheet D	1	2	3	4	5	6	7	8	Final
Sweden (Eriksson) 🔨	1	0	2	0	1	0	1	0	5
Scotland (Hardie)	0	2	0	2	0	2	0	1	7

Player percentages
Sweden		Scotland	
Christoffer Sundgren	89%	Euan Kyle	95%
Simon Olofsson	73%	Craig Waddell	89%
Rasmus Wranå	72%	Grant Hardie	89%
Oskar Eriksson	75%	Ross Whyte	83%
Total	77%	Total	89%

==== Bronze medal game ====
Sunday, November 1, 14:00

Sheet A	1	2	3	4	5	6	7	8	Final
Czech Republic (Klíma)	0	1	0	2	0	0	1	0	4
Sweden (Eriksson) 🔨	2	0	2	0	0	1	0	1	6

Player percentages
Czech Republic		Sweden	
Lukáš Klípa	81%	Christoffer Sundgren	89%
Martin Jurík	69%	Simon Olofsson	77%
Vít Chabičovský	78%	Rasmus Wranå	88%
Lukáš Klíma	86%	Oskar Eriksson	88%
Total	79%	Total	85%

==== Gold medal game ====
Sunday, November 1, 14:00

Sheet C	1	2	3	4	5	6	7	8	Final
Italy (Spiller) 🔨	2	0	0	0	2	0	1	0	5
Scotland (Hardie)	0	2	0	2	0	1	0	1	6

Player percentages
Italy		Scotland	
Cesare Spiller	92%	Euan Kyle	97%
Sebastiano Arman	88%	Craig Waddell	92%
Amos Mosaner	86%	Grant Hardie	91%
Stefano Spiller	80%	Ross Whyte	91%
Total	87%	Total	93%

=== Statistics ===
==== Top 5 player percentages ====
Round robin only

Leads	%
(Sweden) Christoffer Sundgren	95.9
(Switzerland) Justin Hausherr	94.6
(Scotland) Euan Kyle	90.7
(Netherlands) Hessel Janssens	86.1
(Germany) Mario Trevisiol	85.9

Seconds	%
(Scotland) Craig Waddell	87.1
(Norway) Bendik Ramsfjell	86.9
(Sweden) Simon Olofsson	83.4
(Italy) Sebastiano Arman	82.3
(Switzerland) Simon Gloor	82.1

Thirds	%
(Scotland) Grant Hardie (Skip)	87.5
(Sweden) Rasmus Wranå	86.5
(Netherlands) Laurens Hoekman	84.4
(Italy) Amos Mosaner	84.2
(Czech Republic) Vít Chabičovský	81.6

Skips	%
(Scotland) Ross Whyte (Fourth)	89.3
(Sweden) Oskar Eriksson	86.8
(Switzerland) Philipp Hösli (Fourth)	85.5
(Italy) Stefano Spiller	82.9
(Czech Republic) Lukáš Klíma	78.0

==== Perfect games ====
Round robin only; minimum 10 shots thrown

Player	Team	Position	Shots	Opponent
Justin Hausherr	Switzerland	Lead	12	Spain
Ross Whyte	Scotland	Fourth	12	Austria
Bendik Ramsfjell	Norway	Second	16	Switzerland

=== Final standings ===
Place	Team
1st place, gold medalist(s)	Scotland
2nd place, silver medalist(s)	Italy
3rd place, bronze medalist(s)	Sweden
4	Czech Republic
5	Norway
6	Netherlands
7	Germany
8	Switzerland
9	Austria
10	Spain
11	Belgium
12	Poland

== Women ==
=== Qualification ===
The following nations qualified to participate in the 2026 European Curling Championship:

Event	Vacancies	Qualified
2025 European Curling Championships A Division	8	Sweden; Scotland; Switzerland; Norway; Denmark; Turkey; Italy; Lithuania
2025 European Curling Championships B Division	2	Latvia; Estonia
World Rankings	2	Germany; Czech Republic
TOTAL	12	

=== Teams ===
The teams were as follows:

Czech Republic	Denmark	Estonia	Germany
Fourth: Michaela Baudyšová; Skip: Alžběta Zelingrová; Second: Aneta Müllerová; Lead: Karolína Špundová; Alternate: Matylda Volfová	Skip: Madeleine Dupont; Third: Mathilde Halse; Second: Katrine Schmidt; Lead: Denise Dupont; Alternate: Emilie Holtermann	Skip: Marie Kaldvee; Third: Hettel Weddro; Second: Kaidi Elmik; Lead: Liisa Turmann; Alternate: Elisabeth Tammer	Fourth: Kim Sutor; Skip: Sara Messenzehl; Second: Zoe Antes; Lead: Joy Sutor
Italy	Latvia	Lithuania	Norway
Skip: Giulia Zardini Lacedelli; Third: Elena Mathis; Second: Marta Lo Deserto; Lead: Rachele Scalesse	Skip: Evelīna Barone; Third: Rēzija Ieviņa; Second: Katrīna Gaidule; Lead: Betija Gulbe; Alternate: Daina Barone	Skip: Virginija Paulauskaitė; Third: Rūta Blažienė; Second: Miglė Kiudytė; Lead: Olga Dvojeglazova; Alternate: Justina Zalieckienė	Skip: Torild Bjørnstad; Third: Nora Østgård; Second: Ingeborg Forbregd; Lead: Eirin Mesloe
Scotland	Sweden	Switzerland	Turkey
Skip: Fay Henderson; Third: Lisa Davie; Second: Laura Watt; Lead: Katie McMillan; Alternate: Sophie Sinclair	Skip: Isabella Wranå; Third: Almida de Val; Second: Moa Dryburgh; Lead: Maria Larsson; Alternate: Linda Stenlund	Skip: Alina Pätz; Third: Selina Witschonke; Second: Stefanie Berset; Lead: Renée Frigo; Alternate: Nadine Bärtschiger	Skip: Dilşat Yıldız; Third: Berfin Şengül; Second: Melisa Cömert; Lead: Seydanur Morkoç; Alternate: Şüheda Karacalı

=== Round robin standings ===
Final Round Robin Standings

Key
Teams to Playoffs

Group A	Skip	W	L	W–L	PF	PA	EW	EL	BE	SE	S%	DSC
Switzerland	Alina Pätz	5	0	–	35	14	20	9	1	10	81.3%	34.200
Latvia	Evelīna Barone	3	2	1–0	32	27	15	16	1	5	68.7%	91.667
Norway	Torild Bjørnstad	3	2	0–1	24	23	14	14	7	4	75.2%	37.989
Italy	Giulia Zardini Lacedelli	2	3	–	28	23	15	14	5	7	78.2%	56.467
Czech Republic	Alžběta Zelingrová	1	4	1–0	16	35	10	17	1	0	68.7%	42.522
Germany	Sara Messenzehl	1	4	0–1	13	26	11	15	6	0	73.9%	54.811

Group B	Skip	W	L	W–L	PF	PA	EW	EL	BE	SE	S%	DSC
Sweden	Isabella Wranå	5	0	–	44	21	21	15	0	6	80.2%	39.367
Scotland	Fay Henderson	4	1	–	37	30	18	17	1	5	76.5%	60.756
Turkey	Dilşat Yıldız	2	3	1–0	28	38	17	20	1	5	68.4%	69.322
Denmark	Madeleine Dupont	2	3	0–1	32	38	19	20	0	4	74.6%	75.778
Lithuania	Virginija Paulauskaitė	1	4	1–0	31	41	21	21	0	8	62.1%	64.644
Estonia	Marie Kaldvee	1	4	0–1	31	35	17	20	0	4	62.0%	64.122

Group A Round Robin Summary Table
Pos.	Country	Czech Republic	Germany	Italy	Latvia	Norway	Switzerland	Record
5	Czech Republic	—	6–3	1–8	4–11	2–5	3–8	1–4
6	Germany	3–6	—	1–6	5–3	2–7	2–4	1–4
4	Italy	8–1	6–1	—	6–8	4–5	4–8	2–3
2	Latvia	11–4	3–5	8–6	—	8–4	2–8	3–2
3	Norway	5–2	7–2	5–4	4–8	—	3–7	3–2
1	Switzerland	8–3	4–2	8–4	8–2	7–3	—	5–0

Group B Round Robin Summary Table
Pos.	Country	Denmark	Estonia	Lithuania	Scotland	Sweden	Turkey	Record
4	Denmark	—	8–4	8–7	3–12	6–7	7–8	2–3
6	Estonia	4–8	—	7–8	8–9	4–8	8–2	1–4
5	Lithuania	7–8	8–7	—	5–7	4–10	7–9	1–4
2	Scotland	12–3	9–8	7–5	—	2–10	7–4	4–1
1	Sweden	7–6	8–4	10–4	10–2	—	9–5	5–0
3	Turkey	8–7	2–8	9–7	4–7	5–9	—	2–3

=== Round robin results ===
All draw times are listed in Central European Time (UTC+01:00).

==== Draw 1 ====
Tuesday, October 27, 19:00

Sheet A	1	2	3	4	5	6	7	8	Final
Denmark (Dupont) 🔨	0	0	1	0	2	0	X	X	3
Scotland (Henderson)	1	1	0	4	0	6	X	X	12

Sheet B	1	2	3	4	5	6	7	8	Final
Sweden (Wranå) 🔨	3	0	0	2	2	0	1	X	8
Estonia (Kaldvee)	0	1	1	0	0	2	0	X	4

Sheet C	1	2	3	4	5	6	7	8	9	Final
Turkey (Yıldız)	2	1	3	1	0	0	0	0	2	9
Lithuania (Paulauskaitė) 🔨	0	0	0	0	3	1	1	2	0	7

Sheet D	1	2	3	4	5	6	7	8	Final
Switzerland (Pätz) 🔨	0	4	0	1	1	0	2	X	8
Czech Republic (Zelingrová)	0	0	2	0	0	1	0	X	3

Sheet E	1	2	3	4	5	6	7	8	Final
Norway (Bjørnstad) 🔨	0	0	0	1	1	1	0	2	5
Italy (Zardini Lacedelli)	0	0	1	0	0	0	3	0	4

==== Draw 2 ====
Wednesday, October 28, 8:30

Sheet C	1	2	3	4	5	6	7	8	Final
Latvia (Barone)	0	1	0	1	0	0	1	0	3
Germany (Messenzehl) 🔨	1	0	1	0	0	2	0	1	5

==== Draw 3 ====
Wednesday, October 28, 12:00

Sheet B	1	2	3	4	5	6	7	8	Final
Turkey (Yıldız)	0	2	1	0	0	1	0	X	4
Scotland (Henderson) 🔨	2	0	0	3	0	0	2	X	7

Sheet D	1	2	3	4	5	6	7	8	9	Final
Lithuania (Paulauskaitė) 🔨	0	3	0	1	0	2	1	0	1	8
Estonia (Kaldvee)	1	0	3	0	2	0	0	1	0	7

Sheet E	1	2	3	4	5	6	7	8	Final
Sweden (Wranå) 🔨	2	0	1	0	3	0	0	1	7
Denmark (Dupont)	0	1	0	2	0	1	2	0	6

==== Draw 4 ====
Wednesday, October 28, 15:30

Sheet A	1	2	3	4	5	6	7	8	Final
Latvia (Barone)	2	0	0	2	1	0	1	2	8
Norway (Bjørnstad) 🔨	0	0	1	0	0	3	0	0	4

Sheet B	1	2	3	4	5	6	7	8	Final
Germany (Messenzehl) 🔨	0	0	0	1	0	0	1	X	2
Switzerland (Pätz)	2	0	0	0	1	1	0	X	4

Sheet C	1	2	3	4	5	6	7	8	Final
Italy (Zardini Lacedelli)	0	0	0	2	1	1	4	X	8
Czech Republic (Zelingrová) 🔨	1	0	0	0	0	0	0	X	1

==== Draw 5 ====
Wednesday, October 28, 19:00

Sheet A	1	2	3	4	5	6	7	8	Final
Estonia (Kaldvee) 🔨	1	0	1	3	0	3	X	X	8
Turkey (Yıldız)	0	1	0	0	1	0	X	X	2

==== Draw 6 ====
Thursday, October 29, 9:30

Sheet A	1	2	3	4	5	6	7	8	Final
Switzerland (Pätz)	1	1	4	0	1	1	0	X	8
Italy (Zardini Lacedelli) 🔨	0	0	0	2	0	0	2	X	4

Sheet B	1	2	3	4	5	6	7	8	9	Final
Lithuania (Paulauskaitė)	0	1	1	0	2	1	0	2	0	7
Denmark (Dupont) 🔨	2	0	0	2	0	0	3	0	1	8

Sheet C	1	2	3	4	5	6	7	8	Final
Scotland (Henderson) 🔨	0	1	0	0	1	0	0	X	2
Sweden (Wranå)	1	0	2	1	0	2	4	X	10

Sheet D	1	2	3	4	5	6	7	8	Final
Germany (Messenzehl)	0	0	1	0	0	1	X	X	2
Norway (Bjørnstad) 🔨	0	5	0	2	0	0	X	X	7

Sheet E	1	2	3	4	5	6	7	8	Final
Czech Republic (Zelingrová) 🔨	2	0	0	0	2	0	0	X	4
Latvia (Barone)	0	2	0	4	0	0	5	X	11

==== Draw 8 ====
Thursday, October 29, 18:30

Sheet A	1	2	3	4	5	6	7	8	Final
Sweden (Wranå)	0	3	1	0	3	0	3	X	10
Lithuania (Paulauskaitė) 🔨	1	0	0	2	0	1	0	X	4

Sheet D	1	2	3	4	5	6	7	8	Final
Norway (Bjørnstad)	0	0	0	1	0	2	0	X	3
Switzerland (Pätz) 🔨	2	0	0	0	2	0	3	X	7

Sheet E	1	2	3	4	5	6	7	8	9	Final
Denmark (Dupont)	1	0	2	0	1	0	2	1	0	7
Turkey (Yıldız) 🔨	0	4	0	2	0	1	0	0	1	8

Sheet F	1	2	3	4	5	6	7	8	9	Final
Estonia (Kaldvee) 🔨	3	0	3	0	0	2	0	0	0	8
Scotland (Henderson)	0	2	0	0	1	0	3	2	1	9

==== Draw 9 ====
Friday, October 30, 9:30

Sheet A	1	2	3	4	5	6	7	8	Final
Czech Republic (Zelingrová) 🔨	3	0	0	0	2	0	1	X	6
Germany (Messenzehl)	0	0	0	1	0	2	0	X	3

Sheet B	1	2	3	4	5	6	7	8	Final
Italy (Zardini Lacedelli) 🔨	2	2	0	0	2	0	0	X	6
Latvia (Barone)	0	0	2	4	0	2	0	X	8

==== Draw 10 ====
Friday, October 30, 14:00

Sheet D	1	2	3	4	5	6	7	8	Final
Scotland (Henderson) 🔨	3	0	1	2	0	0	0	1	7
Lithuania (Paulauskaitė)	0	1	0	0	1	2	1	0	5

Sheet E	1	2	3	4	5	6	7	8	Final
Turkey (Yıldız) 🔨	2	0	2	0	1	0	0	X	5
Sweden (Wranå)	0	2	0	2	0	3	2	X	9

==== Draw 11 ====
Friday, October 30, 18:30

Sheet B	1	2	3	4	5	6	7	8	Final
Norway (Bjørnstad)	0	1	1	2	0	0	1	X	5
Czech Republic (Zelingrová) 🔨	1	0	0	0	1	0	0	X	2

Sheet C	1	2	3	4	5	6	7	8	Final
Denmark (Dupont)	2	1	0	4	0	0	1	X	8
Estonia (Kaldvee) 🔨	0	0	2	0	1	1	0	X	4

Sheet D	1	2	3	4	5	6	7	8	Final
Latvia (Barone)	0	0	0	2	0	0	X	X	2
Switzerland (Pätz) 🔨	4	1	1	0	1	1	X	X	8

Sheet E	1	2	3	4	5	6	7	8	Final
Italy (Zardini Lacedelli) 🔨	0	0	2	1	0	2	1	X	6
Germany (Messenzehl)	0	0	0	0	1	0	0	X	1

=== Playoffs ===
Semifinals
A1	Switzerland	4
B2	Scotland	3
B1	Sweden	7
A2	Latvia	3

Gold medal game
A1	Switzerland	2
B1	Sweden	7
Bronze medal game
B2	Scotland	6
A2	Latvia	8

==== Semifinals ====
Saturday, October 31, 14:00

Sheet B	1	2	3	4	5	6	7	8	Final
Switzerland (Pätz) 🔨	1	0	0	0	0	1	1	1	4
Scotland (Henderson)	0	0	0	2	1	0	0	0	3

Player percentages
Switzerland		Scotland	
Renée Frigo	86%	Katie McMillan	95%
Stefanie Berset	75%	Laura Watt	72%
Selina Witschonke	80%	Lisa Davie	73%
Alina Pätz	75%	Fay Henderson	78%
Total	79%	Total	80%

Sheet D	1	2	3	4	5	6	7	8	Final
Sweden (Wranå) 🔨	3	0	1	0	2	0	1	X	7
Latvia (Barone)	0	1	0	1	0	1	0	X	3

Player percentages
Sweden		Latvia	
Maria Larsson	78%	Betija Gulbe	80%
Moa Dryburgh	86%	Katrīna Gaidule	69%
Almida de Val	98%	Rēzija Ieviņa	69%
Isabella Wranå	90%	Evelīna Barone	75%
Total	88%	Total	73%

==== Bronze medal game ====
Sunday, November 1, 10:00

Sheet A	1	2	3	4	5	6	7	8	Final
Scotland (Henderson)	0	1	0	3	0	0	2	X	6
Latvia (Barone) 🔨	1	0	4	0	2	1	0	X	8

Player percentages
Scotland		Latvia	
Katie McMillan	89%	Betija Gulbe	56%
Laura Watt	72%	Katrīna Gaidule	50%
Lisa Davie	63%	Rēzija Ieviņa	89%
Fay Henderson	55%	Evelīna Barone	73%
Total	70%	Total	67%

==== Gold medal game ====
Sunday, November 1, 10:00

Sheet C	1	2	3	4	5	6	7	8	Final
Switzerland (Pätz) 🔨	0	0	1	0	1	0	0	X	2
Sweden (Wranå)	0	1	0	2	0	3	1	X	7

Player percentages
Switzerland		Sweden	
Renée Frigo	82%	Maria Larsson	100%
Stefanie Berset	80%	Moa Dryburgh	86%
Selina Witschonke	71%	Almida de Val	88%
Alina Pätz	73%	Isabella Wranå	89%
Total	77%	Total	91%

=== Statistics ===
==== Top 5 player percentages ====
Round robin only

Leads	%
(Norway) Eirin Mesloe	89.1
(Sweden) Maria Larsson	82.3
(Switzerland) Renée Frigo	81.2
(Scotland) Katie McMillan	80.6
(Italy) Rachele Scalesse	80.4

Seconds	%
(Italy) Marta Lo Deserto	83.8
(Denmark) Katrine Schmidt	83.5
(Switzerland) Stefanie Berset	81.5
(Sweden) Moa Dryburgh	79.1
(Germany) Zoe Antes	75.3

Thirds	%
(Switzerland) Selina Witschonke	83.7
(Scotland) Lisa Davie	79.6
(Sweden) Almida de Val	78.7
(Italy) Elena Mathis	76.0
(Germany) Sara Messenzehl (Skip)	73.3

Skips	%
(Sweden) Isabella Wranå	80.6
(Switzerland) Alina Pätz	78.7
(Latvia) Evelīna Barone	73.6
(Norway) Torild Bjørnstad	72.5
(Italy) Giulia Zardini Lacedelli	72.5

=== Final standings ===
Place	Team
1st place, gold medalist(s)	Sweden
2nd place, silver medalist(s)	Switzerland
3rd place, bronze medalist(s)	Latvia
4	Scotland
5	Norway
6	Turkey
7	Italy
8	Denmark
9	Czech Republic
10	Lithuania
11	Germany
12	Estonia
