= Olga Dvojeglazova =

Lithuanian curler (born 1973)

- Curler ♀
- Born: 3 December 1973 (age 52)

Team
- Curling club: Skipas CC, Vilnius
- Skip: Virginija Paulauskaitė
- Third: Rūta Blažienė
- Second: Miglė Kiudytė
- Lead: Olga Dvojeglazova
- Alternate: Justina Zalieckienė

Curling career
- Member Association: Lithuania
- World Championship: 1 (2025)
- European Championship: 9 (2016, 2017, 2018, 2021, 2022, 2023, 2024, 2025, 2026)
Medal record
Curling
Lithuanian Women's Championship
| Gold medal – first place | 2014 Riga |
| Gold medal – first place | 2015 Riga |
| Gold medal – first place | 2016 Riga |
| Gold medal – first place | 2018 Kaunas |
| Gold medal – first place | 2021 Elektrėnai |
| Gold medal – first place | 2022 Kaunas |
| Gold medal – first place | 2023 ... |
| Gold medal – first place | 2024 ... |
| Silver medal – second place | 2017 Riga |
| Silver medal – second place | 2019 Vilnius |
Lithuanian Mixed Doubles Championship
| Silver medal – second place | 2021 Riga |

Olga Dvojeglazova (born 3 December 1973) is a Lithuanian curler and curling coach.

She is a member of the Lithuanian national women's team, who competed at the World Championship for the first time in 2025.

At the national level, she is a multi-time Lithuanian women's champion curler.

== Teams and events ==
=== Women's ===
| Season | Skip | Third | Second | Lead | Alternate | Coach | Events |
|---|---|---|---|---|---|---|---|
| 2013–14 | Virginija Paulauskaitė | Rūta Norkienė | Olga Dvojeglazova | Jelena Jefimova | | | LWCC 2014 (gold) |
| 2014–15 | Virginija Paulauskaitė | Olga Dvojeglazova | Rasa Abelytė | Rasa Lubarte | | | LWCC 2015 (gold) |
| 2015–16 | Virginija Paulauskaitė | Olga Dvojeglazova | Jelena Jefimova | Rasa Abelytė | | | LWCC 2016 (gold) |
| 2016–17 | Virginija Paulauskaitė | Lina Januleviciute | Asta Vaicekonyte | Olga Dvojeglazova | Grazina Eitutiene | Allen Gulka | ECC-B Group 2016 (18th) |
| 2016–17 | Virginija Paulauskaitė | Olga Dvojeglazova | Rasa Abelytė | Jelena Jefimova | | | LWCC 2017 (silver) |
| 2017–18 | Virginija Paulauskaitė | Lina Januleviciute | Asta Vaicekonyte | Olga Dvojeglazova | Grazina Eitutiene | Allen Gulka | ECC-B Group 2017 (17th) |
| 2017–18 | Virginija Paulauskaitė | Olga Dvojeglazova | Rasa Abelytė | Justina Zalieckienė | | | LWCC 2018 (gold) |
| 2018–19 | Virginija Paulauskaitė | Lina Januleviciute | Asta Vaicekonyte | Olga Dvojeglazova | Grazina Eitutiene | Ansis Regža | ECC-B Group 2018 (14th) |
| 2018–19 | Virginija Paulauskaitė | Olga Dvojeglazova | Ruta Blaziene | Dovilė Aukštuolytė | | | LWCC 2019 (silver) |
| 2019–20 | Virginija Paulauskaitė | Olga Dvojeglazova | Dovile Aukstuolyte | Ruta Blaziene | | | |
| 2020–21 | Virginija Paulauskaitė | Olga Dvojeglazova | Dovilė Aukštuolytė | Ruta Blaziene | Justina Zalieckienė | | LWCC 2021 (gold) |
| 2021–22 | Virginija Paulauskaitė | Olga Dvojeglazova | Dovile Aukstuolyte | Ruta Blaziene | | Vygantas Zalieckas | ECC-B Group 2021 (15th) |
| 2021–22 | Virginija Paulauskaitė | Olga Dvojeglazova | Dovilė Aukštuolytė | Ruta Blaziene | Justina Zalieckienė | | LWCC 2022 (gold) |
| 2022–23 | Virginija Paulauskaitė | Olga Dvojeglazova | Dovile Aukstuolyte | Ruta Blaziene | | Vygantas Zalieckas | ECC-B Group 2022 (13th) |
| 2022–23 | Virginija Paulauskaitė | Olga Dvojeglazova | Ruta Blaziene | Justina Zalieckienė | Dovilė Aukštuolytė | | LWCC 2023 (gold) |
| 2023–24 | Virginija Paulauskaitė | Olga Dvojeglazova | Rūta Blažienė | Justina Zalieckienė | Miglė Kiudytė | Vygantas Zalieckas | ECC-B Group 2023 (12th) |
| 2023–24 | Virginija Paulauskaitė | Olga Dvojeglazova | Ruta Blaziene | Justina Zalieckienė | Dovilė Aukštuolytė | | LWCC 2024 (gold) |
| 2024–25 | Virginija Paulauskaitė | Olga Dvojeglazova | Miglė Kiudytė | Rūta Blažienė | Justina Zalieckienė (WCC) | Egle Cepulyte (ECC, WCC), Vygantas Zalieckas (ECC) | ECC-A Group 2024 (8th); WWCC 2025 (13th) |

=== Mixed doubles ===
| Season | Female | Male | Events |
|---|---|---|---|
| 2018–19 | Olga Dvojeglazova | Artur Jefimov | LMDCC 2019 (8th) |
| 2020–21 | Olga Dvojeglazova | Vytis Kulakauskas | LMDCC 2021 (silver) |

== Record as a coach of national teams ==
| Year | Tournament, event | National team | Place |
|---|---|---|---|
| 2024 | 2024 World Senior Curling Championships | Lithuania (senior women) | 2nd place, silver medalist(s) |
