= Lithuanian Mixed Doubles Curling Championship =

The Lithuanian Mixed Doubles Curling Championship (Lithuanian: Lietuvos mišrių dvejetų kerlingo čempionatas, Lietuvos MD kerlingo čempionatas) is the national championship of mixed doubles curling in Lithuania. It has been held annually since 2019 and organized by the Lithuanian Curling Association (Lithuanian: Lietuvos kerlingo asociacija)

The winning team represents Lithuania at the World championship later in this season or at the World qualification event in the middle of next season.

== List of champions and medallists ==
Team line-ups in order: female, male.

| Year | Host city, dates | Champion | Runner-up | Bronze | Finish at World Quals | Finish at Worlds |
|---|---|---|---|---|---|---|
| 2019 | Riga; 1-4 Mar | Lina Janulevičiūtė / Vytis Kulakauskas | Akvilė Rykovė / Konstantin Rykov | Virginija Paulauskaitė / Tadas Vyskupaitis | - | 32th |
| 2020 | not held because COVID-19 | | | | 24th | not held |
| 2021 | Riga; 20-23 May | Akvilė Rykovė / Konstantin Rykov | Olga Dvojeglazova / Vytis Kulakauskas | Asta Vaičekonytė / Nedas Ivanauskas | not held | - |
| 2022 | Riga; 27-30 Jan | Lina Janulevičiūtė / Donatas Kiudys | Mintautė Jurkutė / Paulius Rymeikis | Akvilė Rykovė / Konstantin Rykov | 14th | - |
| 2023 | Riga; 12 Nov 2022 - 1 May 2023 | Lina Janulevičiūtė / Donatas Kiudys | Mintautė Jurkutė / Paulius Rymeikis | Akvilė Rykovė / Konstantin Rykov | 15th | - |
| 2024 | Riga; 18 Nov 2023 - 12 May 2024 | Akvilė Rykovė / Konstantin Rykov | Lina Janulevičiūtė / Donatas Kiudys | Mintautė Jurkutė / Paulius Rymeikis | 25th | - |

== Medals record for curlers ==
As of 2024

| Curler | 1st place, gold medalist(s) | 2nd place, silver medalist(s) | 3rd place, bronze medalist(s) |
|---|---|---|---|
| Lina Janulevičiūtė | 3 | 1 | |
| Konstantin Rykov | 2 | 1 | 2 |
| Akvilė Rykovė | 2 | 1 | 2 |
| Donatas Kiudys | 2 | 1 | |
| Vytis Kulakauskas | 1 | 1 | |
| Mintautė Jurkutė | | 2 | 1 |
| Paulius Rymeikis | | 2 | 1 |
| Olga Dvojeglazova | | 1 | |
| Nedas Ivanauskas | | | 1 |
| Virginija Paulauskaitė | | | 1 |
| Asta Vaičekonytė | | | 1 |
| Tadas Vyskupaitis | | | 1 |

== See also ==
- Lithuanian Men's Curling Championship
- Lithuanian Women's Curling Championship
