= 2025 World Women's Curling Championship =

2025 edition of the World Women's Curling Championship

- Host city: Uijeongbu, South Korea
- Arena: Uijeongbu Indoor Ice Rink
- Dates: March 15–23
- Winner: Canada
- Curling club: Ottawa CC, Ottawa
- Skip: Rachel Homan
- Third: Tracy Fleury
- Second: Emma Miskew
- Lead: Sarah Wilkes
- Alternate: Rachelle Brown
- Coach: Viktor Kjäll
- Finalist: Switzerland (Silvana Tirinzoni)

The 2025 World Women's Curling Championship (46th) (branded as the 2025 LGT World Women's Curling Championship for sponsorship reasons) was held from March 15 to 23 at the Uijeongbu Indoor Ice Rink in Uijeongbu, South Korea. It was the first international curling event held in Uijeongbu and the second World Women's Championship held in Korea as Gangneung hosted the 2009 championship. This event was the last women's event to earn Qualification Points for the 2026 Winter Olympics.

The format for the Championship featured a thirteen team round robin. The top six teams qualified for the playoff round, where the top two teams receive a bye while the remaining four play in the qualification round to qualify for the semifinals.

The final featured a rematch of between Canada's Rachel Homan rink and Switzerland's Team Silvana Tirinzoni, who both faced off against each other in the 2024 final, which was won by Homan. In the game, Homan took a commanding 6–3 lead in the eighth end. On her final stone of the end, Homan made a delicate tap to sit two. Swiss fourth-thrower Alina Pätz then overcurled on her attempt to draw to the button, giving up a steal of two. Pätz missed her final shot in the 9th as well, giving up another point, to go down 7–3. At this point, the Swiss team conceded the match to Canada. With the win, Homan and her team became the first Canadian rink to win back to back world championships since Sandra Schmirler in 1993 and 1994. It was the third World Championship for Homan and second Emma Miskew, who also won in 2017. It was also the first time a Canadian men's or women's national team had won a gold at a World Championship overseas since Homan's win in 2017.

China won the bronze medal, defeating the host South Koreans 9–4.

== Qualification ==
Thirteen curling federations qualified to participate in the 2025 World Women's Curling Championship. Of note, this was the first World Women's Championship appearance for Lithuania, who was represented by skip Virginija Paulauskaitė. China returned for the first time since 2021 while Turkey qualified for a fourth straight year since their debut in 2022.

Means of Qualification	Vacancies	Qualified
Host Nation	1	South Korea
2024 Pan Continental Curling Championships	4	Canada; China; Japan; United States
2024 European Curling Championships	8	Switzerland; Sweden; Scotland; Italy; Denmark; Turkey; Norway; Lithuania
TOTAL	13	

== Teams ==
The teams are as follows:

Canada	China	Denmark	Italy	Japan
Ottawa CC, Ottawa Skip: Rachel Homan; Third: Tracy Fleury; Second: Emma Miskew; Lead: Sarah Wilkes; Alternate: Rachelle Brown	CSO Curling Club, Beijing Skip: Wang Rui (Note: For the last two ends of Draw 14, Team China skip Wang Rui removed herself from the game with Han Yu skipping the team, and Dong Ziqi playing third. Alternate Su Tingyu threw second rocks.); Third: Han Yu; Second: Dong Ziqi (Note: For the last five ends of Draw 20, Team China's alternate Su Tingyu threw second rocks.); Lead: Jiang Jiayi; Alternate: Su Tingyu	Hvidovre CC, Hvidovre Skip: Madeleine Dupont; Third: Mathilde Halse; Second: Jasmin Holtermann; Lead: Denise Dupont; Alternate: My Larsen	CC Dolomiti, Cortina d'Ampezzo Skip: Stefania Constantini; Third: Giulia Zardini Lacedelli; Second: Elena Mathis; Lead: Angela Romei; Alternate: Marta Lo Deserto	Sapporo CC, Sapporo Skip: Sayaka Yoshimura; Third: Kaho Onodera; Second: Yuna Kotani; Lead: Anna Ohmiya; Alternate: Mina Kobayashi
Lithuania	Norway	Scotland	South Korea	Sweden
Skipas CC, Vilnius Skip: Virginija Paulauskaitė; Third: Olga Dvojeglazova; Second: Miglė Kiudytė; Lead: Rūta Blažienė; Alternate: Justina Zalieckienė	Lillehammer CC, Lillehammer Fourth: Kristin Skaslien; Skip: Marianne Rørvik; Second: Mille Haslev Nordbye; Lead: Eilin Kjærland; Alternate: Ingeborg Forbregd	Curl Aberdeen, Aberdeen Fourth: Rebecca Morrison; Third: Jennifer Dodds; Second: Sophie Sinclair; Skip: Sophie Jackson; Alternate: Fay Henderson	Uijeongbu CC, Uijeongbu Skip: Gim Eun-ji; Third: Kim Min-ji; Second: Kim Su-ji; Lead: Seol Ye-eun; Alternate: Seol Ye-ji	Sundbybergs CK, Sundbyberg Skip: Anna Hasselborg; Third: Sara McManus; Second: Agnes Knochenhauer; Lead: Sofia Mabergs; Alternate: Johanna Heldin
Switzerland	Turkey	United States		
CC Aarau, Aarau Fourth: Alina Pätz; Skip: Silvana Tirinzoni; Second: Carole Howald; Lead: Selina Witschonke; Alternate: Stefanie Berset	Milli Piyango CA, Erzurum Skip: Dilşat Yıldız; Third: Öznur Polat; Second: İfayet Şafak Çalıkuşu; Lead: Berfin Şengül; Alternate: İclal Karaman	St. Paul CC, St. Paul Skip: Tabitha Peterson; Third: Cory Thiesse; Second: Tara Peterson; Lead: Taylor Anderson-Heide; Alternate: Vicky Persinger		

=== WCF ranking ===
Year to date World Curling Federation order of merit ranking for each team prior to the event.

Nation (Skip)	Rank	Points
Canada (Homan)	1	447.5
Switzerland (Tirinzoni)	2	312.1
Sweden (Hasselborg)	3	306.0
Japan (Yoshimura)	8	244.3
South Korea (Gim)	10	236.3
Italy (Constantini)	15	180.3
China (Wang)	17	154.1
Scotland (Morrison)	19	143.6
Denmark (Dupont)	30	100.1
United States (Peterson)	31	98.0
Norway (Rørvik)	32	93.9
Turkey (Yıldız)	37	81.8
Lithuania (Paulauskaitė)	123	11.3

== Round robin standings ==
Final Round Robin Standings

Key
Teams to Playoffs

Country	Skip	W	L	W–L	PF	PA	EW	EL	BE	SE	S%	DSC
Switzerland	Silvana Tirinzoni	11	1	–	95	65	51	47	11	9	86.7%	20.25
South Korea	Gim Eun-ji	10	2	1–0	92	65	55	42	18	9	86.5%	23.66
Canada	Rachel Homan	10	2	0–1	103	59	57	41	7	15	88.7%	16.40
Sweden	Anna Hasselborg	9	3	–	82	62	54	41	12	17	87.1%	20.25
China	Wang Rui	7	5	1–0	81	71	53	42	6	15	86.7%	20.25
Scotland	Sophie Jackson	7	5	0–1	78	67	49	46	8	10	86.1%	42.44
Denmark	Madeleine Dupont	5	7	1–0	79	84	44	48	5	10	82.5%	36.93
Norway	Marianne Rørvik	5	7	0–1	68	87	45	49	8	5	83.4%	25.00
Japan	Sayaka Yoshimura	4	8	1–0	78	79	45	48	6	8	85.0%	21.53
Italy	Stefania Constantini	4	8	0–1	71	79	42	52	6	6	82.0%	27.85
Turkey	Dilşat Yıldız	3	9	1–0	56	80	39	47	8	8	78.5%	38.25
United States	Tabitha Peterson	3	9	0–1	67	79	46	50	5	9	81.0%	31.87
Lithuania	Virginija Paulauskaitė	0	12	–	37	110	28	55	4	3	66.8%	52.60

Round Robin Summary Table
Pos.	Country	Canada	China	Denmark	Italy	Japan	Lithuania	Norway	Scotland	South Korea	Sweden	Switzerland	Turkey	United States	Record
3	Canada	—	7–5	9–3	9–2	11–2	13–2	8–6	7–8	7–11	9–7	7–6	8–3	8–4	10–2
5	China	5–7	—	9–5	8–7	10–9	8–2	8–9	7–2	6–9	4–8	4–9	5–3	7–1	7–5
7	Denmark	3–9	5–9	—	7–6	2–8	11–2	13–7	5–10	3–7	5–7	6–7	9–3	10–9	5–7
10	Italy	2–9	7–8	6–7	—	5–10	8–2	9–2	5–7	2–6	6–7	5–8	8–6	8–7	4–8
9	Japan	2–11	9–10	8–2	10–5	—	10–3	6–3	5–6	8–10	6–7	5–9	3–4	6–9	4–8
13	Lithuania	2–13	2–8	2–11	2–8	3–10	—	7–8	2–9	4–10	2–8	8–9	2–8	1–8	0–12
8	Norway	6–8	9–8	7–13	2–9	3–6	8–7	—	8–7	4–6	4–6	4–8	7–6	6–3	5–7
6	Scotland	8–7	2–7	10–5	7–5	6–5	9–2	7–8	—	4–5	3–5	5–6	10–6	7–6	7–5
2	South Korea	11–7	9–6	7–3	6–2	10–8	10–4	6–4	5–4	—	5–7	6–9	9–4	8–7	10–2
4	Sweden	7–9	8–4	7–5	7–6	7–6	8–2	6–4	5–3	7–5	—	7–11	8–1	5–6	9–3
1	Switzerland	6–7	9–4	7–6	8–5	9–5	9–8	8–4	6–5	9–6	11–7	—	8–4	5–4	11–1
11	Turkey	3–8	3–5	3–9	6–8	4–3	8–2	6–7	6–10	4–9	1–8	4–8	—	8–3	3–9
12	United States	4–8	1–7	9–10	7–8	9–6	8–1	3–6	6–7	7–8	6–5	4–5	3–8	—	3–9

== Round robin results ==
All draw times are listed in Korea Standard Time (UTC+09:00).

=== Draw 1 ===
Saturday, March 15, 2:00 pm

Sheet A	1	2	3	4	5	6	7	8	9	10	Final
Sweden (Hasselborg)	0	0	0	1	2	0	1	0	0	2	6
Norway (Rørvik) 🔨	1	0	0	0	0	2	0	1	0	0	4

Sheet B	1	2	3	4	5	6	7	8	9	10	Final
Lithuania (Paulauskaitė)	0	1	0	0	1	0	X	X	X	X	2
Canada (Homan) 🔨	2	0	5	2	0	4	X	X	X	X	13

Sheet C	1	2	3	4	5	6	7	8	9	10	11	Final
Japan (Yoshimura)	0	0	3	0	0	2	0	2	0	1	0	8
South Korea (Gim) 🔨	0	4	0	0	2	0	1	0	1	0	2	10

Sheet D	1	2	3	4	5	6	7	8	9	10	Final
China (Wang)	0	0	0	0	0	2	1	1	0	1	5
Turkey (Yıldız) 🔨	0	0	0	2	0	0	0	0	1	0	3

=== Draw 2 ===
Saturday, March 15, 7:00 pm

Sheet A	1	2	3	4	5	6	7	8	9	10	Final
United States (Peterson)	0	0	0	1	0	1	0	0	1	1	4
Switzerland (Tirinzoni) 🔨	0	0	2	0	2	0	0	1	0	0	5

Sheet B	1	2	3	4	5	6	7	8	9	10	Final
Sweden (Hasselborg) 🔨	0	2	1	1	1	0	3	X	X	X	8
Turkey (Yıldız)	0	0	0	0	0	1	0	X	X	X	1

Sheet C	1	2	3	4	5	6	7	8	9	10	11	Final
Italy (Constantini) 🔨	2	0	0	2	1	0	1	0	0	0	0	6
Denmark (Dupont)	0	2	0	0	0	1	0	1	1	1	1	7

Sheet D	1	2	3	4	5	6	7	8	9	10	Final
Scotland (Jackson)	0	0	3	0	0	1	0	1	0	3	8
Canada (Homan) 🔨	0	1	0	1	1	0	2	0	2	0	7

=== Draw 3 ===
Sunday, March 16, 9:00 am

Sheet A	1	2	3	4	5	6	7	8	9	10	Final
Denmark (Dupont)	1	3	1	0	5	1	X	X	X	X	11
Lithuania (Paulauskaitė) 🔨	0	0	0	2	0	0	X	X	X	X	2

Sheet B	1	2	3	4	5	6	7	8	9	10	Final
Switzerland (Tirinzoni) 🔨	0	0	1	0	0	4	1	0	3	X	9
China (Wang)	0	0	0	1	1	0	0	2	0	X	4

Sheet C	1	2	3	4	5	6	7	8	9	10	Final
Norway (Rørvik) 🔨	0	2	0	2	0	2	0	1	0	1	8
Scotland (Jackson)	0	0	2	0	2	0	1	0	2	0	7

Sheet D	1	2	3	4	5	6	7	8	9	10	Final
Italy (Constantini)	0	1	0	2	0	2	0	0	0	X	5
Japan (Yoshimura) 🔨	5	0	1	0	2	0	1	1	0	X	10

=== Draw 4 ===
Sunday, March 16, 2:00 pm

Sheet A	1	2	3	4	5	6	7	8	9	10	Final
China (Wang)	0	1	4	0	2	2	0	1	0	0	10
Japan (Yoshimura) 🔨	0	0	0	3	0	0	2	0	2	2	9

Sheet B	1	2	3	4	5	6	7	8	9	10	Final
South Korea (Gim) 🔨	0	1	1	0	2	0	1	1	0	X	6
Norway (Rørvik)	0	0	0	1	0	1	0	0	2	X	4

Sheet C	1	2	3	4	5	6	7	8	9	10	Final
Canada (Homan) 🔨	0	1	1	0	4	1	1	0	0	1	9
Sweden (Hasselborg)	2	0	0	1	0	0	0	3	1	0	7

Sheet D	1	2	3	4	5	6	7	8	9	10	Final
Lithuania (Paulauskaitė)	0	0	1	0	0	0	X	X	X	X	1
United States (Peterson) 🔨	2	1	0	3	1	1	X	X	X	X	8

=== Draw 5 ===
Sunday, March 16, 7:00 pm

Sheet A	1	2	3	4	5	6	7	8	9	10	11	Final
Scotland (Jackson) 🔨	0	0	1	0	0	1	0	0	0	2	0	4
South Korea (Gim)	0	1	0	0	2	0	0	1	0	0	1	5

Sheet B	1	2	3	4	5	6	7	8	9	10	Final
United States (Peterson)	0	2	1	0	1	0	2	0	0	1	7
Italy (Constantini) 🔨	3	0	0	1	0	1	0	2	1	0	8

Sheet C	1	2	3	4	5	6	7	8	9	10	Final
Turkey (Yıldız)	0	1	1	0	1	0	0	1	X	X	4
Switzerland (Tirinzoni) 🔨	3	0	0	1	0	3	1	0	X	X	8

Sheet D	1	2	3	4	5	6	7	8	9	10	Final
Denmark (Dupont)	0	0	0	0	1	0	2	0	2	0	5
Sweden (Hasselborg) 🔨	0	0	2	2	0	1	0	2	0	0	7

=== Draw 6 ===
Monday, March 17, 9:00 am

Sheet A	1	2	3	4	5	6	7	8	9	10	Final
Norway (Rørvik) 🔨	0	0	2	0	0	3	0	1	0	1	7
Turkey (Yıldız)	0	0	0	0	2	0	0	0	4	0	6

Sheet B	1	2	3	4	5	6	7	8	9	10	Final
Japan (Yoshimura) 🔨	1	0	3	0	2	0	4	X	X	X	10
Lithuania (Paulauskaitė)	0	1	0	1	0	1	0	X	X	X	3

Sheet C	1	2	3	4	5	6	7	8	9	10	Final
Scotland (Jackson)	0	1	0	0	2	0	1	2	0	1	7
Italy (Constantini) 🔨	0	0	0	1	0	1	0	0	3	0	5

=== Draw 7 ===
Monday, March 17, 2:00 pm

Sheet A	1	2	3	4	5	6	7	8	9	10	Final
Japan (Yoshimura) 🔨	1	0	0	1	0	1	0	2	0	X	5
Switzerland (Tirinzoni)	0	2	3	0	1	0	2	0	1	X	9

Sheet B	1	2	3	4	5	6	7	8	9	10	Final
Canada (Homan) 🔨	2	0	1	1	0	2	1	2	X	X	9
Denmark (Dupont)	0	2	0	0	1	0	0	0	X	X	3

Sheet C	1	2	3	4	5	6	7	8	9	10	11	Final
Sweden (Hasselborg)	0	0	0	1	0	2	0	0	1	1	0	5
United States (Peterson) 🔨	0	1	0	0	3	0	0	1	0	0	1	6

Sheet D	1	2	3	4	5	6	7	8	9	10	11	Final
South Korea (Gim) 🔨	0	0	2	0	1	0	1	0	2	0	3	9
China (Wang)	0	0	0	1	0	1	0	1	0	3	0	6

=== Draw 8 ===
Monday, March 17, 7:00 pm

Sheet A	1	2	3	4	5	6	7	8	9	10	Final
Italy (Constantini) 🔨	3	0	2	0	3	0	X	X	X	X	8
Lithuania (Paulauskaitė)	0	1	0	0	0	1	X	X	X	X	2

Sheet B	1	2	3	4	5	6	7	8	9	10	Final
Turkey (Yıldız)	0	0	2	0	1	0	0	1	0	X	4
South Korea (Gim) 🔨	0	1	0	2	0	3	1	0	2	X	9

Sheet C	1	2	3	4	5	6	7	8	9	10	Final
Denmark (Dupont) 🔨	2	0	1	0	3	0	3	0	4	X	13
Norway (Rørvik)	0	3	0	1	0	2	0	1	0	X	7

Sheet D	1	2	3	4	5	6	7	8	9	10	Final
Switzerland (Tirinzoni) 🔨	0	0	0	1	0	2	0	2	0	1	6
Scotland (Jackson)	0	0	2	0	1	0	1	0	1	0	5

=== Draw 9 ===
Tuesday, March 18, 9:00 am

Sheet B	1	2	3	4	5	6	7	8	9	10	Final
Lithuania (Paulauskaitė) 🔨	1	0	0	0	2	0	0	1	3	0	7
Norway (Rørvik)	0	1	0	0	0	3	2	0	0	2	8

Sheet C	1	2	3	4	5	6	7	8	9	10	Final
China (Wang) 🔨	0	0	3	1	0	1	0	2	0	1	8
Italy (Constantini)	0	1	0	0	2	0	2	0	2	0	7

Sheet D	1	2	3	4	5	6	7	8	9	10	Final
United States (Peterson)	0	0	1	0	1	0	1	0	1	0	4
Canada (Homan) 🔨	0	2	0	2	0	1	0	2	0	1	8

=== Draw 10 ===
Tuesday, March 18, 2:00 pm

Sheet A	1	2	3	4	5	6	7	8	9	10	Final
Switzerland (Tirinzoni)	0	0	0	1	0	2	2	0	2	2	9
South Korea (Gim) 🔨	0	0	3	0	1	0	0	2	0	0	6

Sheet B	1	2	3	4	5	6	7	8	9	10	Final
Scotland (Jackson)	0	0	1	0	0	1	0	1	0	X	3
Sweden (Hasselborg) 🔨	0	1	0	1	0	0	1	0	2	X	5

Sheet C	1	2	3	4	5	6	7	8	9	10	Final
United States (Peterson) 🔨	0	1	2	0	1	0	0	1	0	4	9
Japan (Yoshimura)	0	0	0	1	0	2	1	0	2	0	6

Sheet D	1	2	3	4	5	6	7	8	9	10	Final
Turkey (Yıldız) 🔨	1	0	1	0	1	0	0	0	X	X	3
Denmark (Dupont)	0	2	0	2	0	0	2	3	X	X	9

=== Draw 11 ===
Tuesday, March 18, 7:00 pm

Sheet A	1	2	3	4	5	6	7	8	9	10	Final
Canada (Homan)	1	2	0	1	0	1	0	3	X	X	8
Turkey (Yıldız) 🔨	0	0	2	0	0	0	1	0	X	X	3

Sheet B	1	2	3	4	5	6	7	8	9	10	Final
Italy (Constantini)	0	2	0	1	0	1	0	1	0	0	5
Switzerland (Tirinzoni) 🔨	2	0	1	0	1	0	1	0	2	1	8

Sheet C	1	2	3	4	5	6	7	8	9	10	Final
Lithuania (Paulauskaitė)	0	0	0	0	2	0	0	X	X	X	2
Scotland (Jackson) 🔨	0	2	2	1	0	2	2	X	X	X	9

Sheet D	1	2	3	4	5	6	7	8	9	10	Final
Norway (Rørvik) 🔨	0	2	0	3	0	2	0	1	0	1	9
China (Wang)	0	0	1	0	2	0	2	0	3	0	8

=== Draw 12 ===
Wednesday, March 19, 9:00 am

Sheet A	1	2	3	4	5	6	7	8	9	10	Final
Denmark (Dupont)	0	2	0	0	0	0	X	X	X	X	2
Japan (Yoshimura) 🔨	2	0	2	1	1	2	X	X	X	X	8

Sheet B	1	2	3	4	5	6	7	8	9	10	Final
China (Wang) 🔨	0	0	2	0	0	2	1	2	X	X	7
United States (Peterson)	0	0	0	0	1	0	0	0	X	X	1

Sheet C	1	2	3	4	5	6	7	8	9	10	Final
South Korea (Gim)	0	1	0	2	0	3	0	2	0	3	11
Canada (Homan) 🔨	0	0	2	0	1	0	1	0	3	0	7

Sheet D	1	2	3	4	5	6	7	8	9	10	Final
Sweden (Hasselborg)	0	1	1	0	4	0	1	1	X	X	8
Lithuania (Paulauskaitė) 🔨	0	0	0	1	0	1	0	0	X	X	2

=== Draw 13 ===
Wednesday, March 19, 2:00 pm

Sheet A	1	2	3	4	5	6	7	8	9	10	11	Final
Scotland (Jackson)	0	0	0	1	0	3	0	0	2	0	1	7
United States (Peterson) 🔨	0	1	0	0	1	0	1	0	0	3	0	6

Sheet B	1	2	3	4	5	6	7	8	9	10	Final
Denmark (Dupont)	0	0	0	0	0	2	0	1	0	X	3
South Korea (Gim) 🔨	0	0	0	1	1	0	1	0	4	X	7

Sheet C	1	2	3	4	5	6	7	8	9	10	Final
Switzerland (Tirinzoni) 🔨	0	2	0	1	0	1	1	0	3	X	8
Norway (Rørvik)	0	0	2	0	1	0	0	1	0	X	4

Sheet D	1	2	3	4	5	6	7	8	9	10	Final
Turkey (Yıldız)	0	0	1	0	3	1	0	1	0	0	6
Italy (Constantini) 🔨	0	1	0	3	0	0	2	0	0	2	8

=== Draw 14 ===
Wednesday, March 19, 7:00 pm

Sheet A	1	2	3	4	5	6	7	8	9	10	Final
Lithuania (Paulauskaitė)	0	0	1	0	0	1	0	0	X	X	2
China (Wang) 🔨	1	2	0	2	1	0	1	1	X	X	8

Sheet B	1	2	3	4	5	6	7	8	9	10	Final
Norway (Rørvik) 🔨	1	0	0	1	0	1	0	2	1	0	6
Canada (Homan)	0	1	3	0	1	0	1	0	0	2	8

Sheet C	1	2	3	4	5	6	7	8	9	10	Final
Italy (Constantini)	0	0	0	0	1	0	3	0	1	1	6
Sweden (Hasselborg) 🔨	0	0	2	2	0	1	0	2	0	0	7

Sheet D	1	2	3	4	5	6	7	8	9	10	Final
Japan (Yoshimura)	0	0	3	0	0	1	0	1	0	0	5
Scotland (Jackson) 🔨	0	1	0	1	1	0	1	0	0	2	6

=== Draw 15 ===
Thursday, March 20, 9:00 am

Sheet A	1	2	3	4	5	6	7	8	9	10	Final
South Korea (Gim)	0	1	0	2	0	1	0	0	1	0	5
Sweden (Hasselborg) 🔨	2	0	1	0	2	0	1	0	0	1	7

Sheet B	1	2	3	4	5	6	7	8	9	10	Final
Turkey (Yıldız)	0	0	0	1	0	0	1	1	0	1	4
Japan (Yoshimura) 🔨	0	0	2	0	0	0	0	0	1	0	3

Sheet C	1	2	3	4	5	6	7	8	9	10	Final
United States (Peterson)	0	0	2	0	2	0	2	0	3	0	9
Denmark (Dupont) 🔨	0	3	0	2	0	1	0	2	0	2	10

Sheet D	1	2	3	4	5	6	7	8	9	10	11	Final
Canada (Homan) 🔨	0	1	0	2	0	0	1	0	2	0	1	7
Switzerland (Tirinzoni)	0	0	2	0	2	0	0	1	0	1	0	6

=== Draw 16 ===
Thursday, March 20, 2:00 pm

Sheet A	1	2	3	4	5	6	7	8	9	10	Final
Norway (Rørvik)	0	0	1	0	1	0	X	X	X	X	2
Italy (Constantini) 🔨	1	2	0	4	0	2	X	X	X	X	9

Sheet B	1	2	3	4	5	6	7	8	9	10	Final
Switzerland (Tirinzoni) 🔨	0	2	0	2	0	0	4	0	0	1	9
Lithuania (Paulauskaitė)	0	0	1	0	3	2	0	1	1	0	8

Sheet C	1	2	3	4	5	6	7	8	9	10	Final
Scotland (Jackson)	3	0	3	0	2	0	1	0	1	X	10
Turkey (Yıldız) 🔨	0	1	0	2	0	2	0	1	0	X	6

Sheet D	1	2	3	4	5	6	7	8	9	10	Final
China (Wang) 🔨	1	0	2	0	3	0	1	0	2	X	9
Denmark (Dupont)	0	1	0	1	0	2	0	1	0	X	5

=== Draw 17 ===
Thursday, March 20, 7:00 pm

Sheet A	1	2	3	4	5	6	7	8	9	10	Final
Japan (Yoshimura)	0	0	0	1	0	1	0	0	X	X	2
Canada (Homan) 🔨	0	2	0	0	3	0	1	5	X	X	11

Sheet B	1	2	3	4	5	6	7	8	9	10	Final
Sweden (Hasselborg)	0	0	1	1	0	0	2	1	0	3	8
China (Wang) 🔨	0	2	0	0	0	1	0	0	1	0	4

Sheet C	1	2	3	4	5	6	7	8	9	10	Final
South Korea (Gim) 🔨	2	0	3	0	2	0	2	1	X	X	10
Lithuania (Paulauskaitė)	0	2	0	1	0	1	0	0	X	X	4

Sheet D	1	2	3	4	5	6	7	8	9	10	Final
United States (Peterson)	0	1	1	0	0	1	0	0	0	X	3
Norway (Rørvik) 🔨	0	0	0	1	2	0	0	1	2	X	6

=== Draw 18 ===
Friday, March 21, 9:00 am

Sheet A	1	2	3	4	5	6	7	8	9	10	Final
Turkey (Yıldız) 🔨	2	0	2	1	0	0	1	2	X	X	8
United States (Peterson)	0	1	0	0	1	1	0	0	X	X	3

Sheet B	1	2	3	4	5	6	7	8	9	10	Final
Denmark (Dupont) 🔨	0	0	1	0	2	1	0	1	0	X	5
Scotland (Jackson)	1	1	0	2	0	0	1	0	5	X	10

Sheet C	1	2	3	4	5	6	7	8	9	10	Final
Sweden (Hasselborg) 🔨	1	0	2	1	0	0	2	1	0	X	7
Switzerland (Tirinzoni)	0	2	0	0	2	3	0	0	4	X	11

Sheet D	1	2	3	4	5	6	7	8	9	10	Final
Italy (Constantini)	0	0	0	0	0	1	0	1	0	X	2
South Korea (Gim) 🔨	0	0	0	2	1	0	1	0	2	X	6

=== Draw 19 ===
Friday, March 21, 2:00 pm

Sheet A	1	2	3	4	5	6	7	8	9	10	Final
China (Wang) 🔨	1	2	1	0	1	0	2	X	X	X	7
Scotland (Jackson)	0	0	0	1	0	1	0	X	X	X	2

Sheet B	1	2	3	4	5	6	7	8	9	10	Final
Canada (Homan) 🔨	0	3	0	2	0	2	2	X	X	X	9
Italy (Constantini)	0	0	1	0	1	0	0	X	X	X	2

Sheet C	1	2	3	4	5	6	7	8	9	10	Final
Norway (Rørvik) 🔨	0	0	0	1	0	1	0	1	0	X	3
Japan (Yoshimura)	0	0	1	0	2	0	2	0	1	X	6

Sheet D	1	2	3	4	5	6	7	8	9	10	Final
Lithuania (Paulauskaitė)	0	1	0	0	0	0	1	0	0	X	2
Turkey (Yıldız) 🔨	2	0	0	2	1	2	0	0	1	X	8

=== Draw 20 ===
Friday, March 21, 7:00 pm

Sheet A	1	2	3	4	5	6	7	8	9	10	11	Final
Switzerland (Tirinzoni)	0	0	2	0	0	0	0	4	0	0	1	7
Denmark (Dupont) 🔨	0	0	0	0	2	0	0	0	2	2	0	6

Sheet B	1	2	3	4	5	6	7	8	9	10	11	Final
South Korea (Gim) 🔨	0	1	0	2	1	0	2	0	1	0	1	8
United States (Peterson)	0	0	4	0	0	1	0	1	0	1	0	7

Sheet C	1	2	3	4	5	6	7	8	9	10	Final
Canada (Homan)	0	2	0	2	0	2	1	0	0	X	7
China (Wang) 🔨	1	0	1	0	1	0	0	1	1	X	5

Sheet D	1	2	3	4	5	6	7	8	9	10	Final
Japan (Yoshimura)	0	2	0	0	1	0	1	0	2	0	6
Sweden (Hasselborg) 🔨	2	0	1	2	0	0	0	1	0	1	7

== Playoffs ==
Qualification games
4	Sweden	7
5	China	8
3	Canada	10
6	Scotland	4

Semifinals
1	Switzerland	4
5	China	2
2	South Korea	5
3	Canada	6

Final
1	Switzerland	3
3	Canada	7
Bronze medal game
5	China	9
2	South Korea	4

=== Qualification Games ===
Saturday, March 22, 10:00 am

Sheet B	1	2	3	4	5	6	7	8	9	10	Final
Canada (Homan) 🔨	0	4	0	3	0	1	2	0	X	X	10
Scotland (Jackson)	0	0	1	0	2	0	0	1	X	X	4

Player percentages
Canada		Scotland	
Sarah Wilkes	84%	Sophie Jackson	94%
Emma Miskew	94%	Sophie Sinclair	81%
Tracy Fleury	94%	Jennifer Dodds	95%
Rachel Homan	93%	Rebecca Morrison	83%
Total	91%	Total	88%

Sheet D	1	2	3	4	5	6	7	8	9	10	Final
Sweden (Hasselborg) 🔨	2	0	1	1	1	0	0	0	2	0	7
China (Wang)	0	2	0	0	0	2	0	1	0	3	8

Player percentages
Sweden		China	
Sofia Mabergs	91%	Jiang Jiayi	83%
Agnes Knochenhauer	85%	Dong Ziqi	91%
Sara McManus	95%	Han Yu	79%
Anna Hasselborg	80%	Wang Rui	80%
Total	88%	Total	83%

=== Semifinals ===
Saturday, March 22, 4:00 pm

Sheet B	1	2	3	4	5	6	7	8	9	10	Final
Switzerland (Tirinzoni) 🔨	2	0	0	0	0	0	0	0	1	1	4
China (Wang)	0	0	0	0	0	0	0	2	0	0	2

Player percentages
Switzerland		China	
Selina Witschonke	100%	Jiang Jiayi	95%
Carole Howald	95%	Dong Ziqi	79%
Silvana Tirinzoni	90%	Han Yu	93%
Alina Pätz	90%	Wang Rui	94%
Total	94%	Total	90%

Sheet D	1	2	3	4	5	6	7	8	9	10	11	Final
South Korea (Gim) 🔨	0	0	2	0	1	0	0	1	0	1	0	5
Canada (Homan)	0	1	0	1	0	1	0	0	2	0	1	6

Player percentages
South Korea		Canada	
Seol Ye-eun	84%	Sarah Wilkes	98%
Kim Su-ji	70%	Emma Miskew	89%
Kim Min-ji	81%	Tracy Fleury	92%
Gim Eun-ji	83%	Rachel Homan	85%
Total	80%	Total	91%

=== Bronze medal game ===
Sunday, March 23, 10:00 am

Sheet C	1	2	3	4	5	6	7	8	9	10	Final
China (Wang)	0	0	1	0	1	0	2	1	1	3	9
South Korea (Gim) 🔨	0	1	0	1	0	2	0	0	0	0	4

Player percentages
China		South Korea	
Jiang Jiayi	94%	Seol Ye-eun	95%
Dong Ziqi	78%	Kim Su-ji	74%
Han Yu	93%	Kim Min-ji	85%
Wang Rui	89%	Gim Eun-ji	76%
Total	88%	Total	83%

=== Final ===
Sunday, March 23, 4:00 pm

Sheet C	1	2	3	4	5	6	7	8	9	10	Final
Switzerland (Tirinzoni) 🔨	0	0	0	2	0	1	0	0	0	X	3
Canada (Homan)	0	0	1	0	1	0	2	2	1	X	7

Player percentages
Switzerland		Canada	
Selina Witschonke	85%	Sarah Wilkes	89%
Carole Howald	81%	Emma Miskew	85%
Silvana Tirinzoni	75%	Tracy Fleury	93%
Alina Pätz	76%	Rachel Homan	89%
Total	79%	Total	89%

== Statistics ==
=== Player percentages ===
Final Round Robin Percentages

Key
All-Star Team

Leads	%
(China) Jiang Jiayi	92.6
(Canada) Sarah Wilkes	92.4
(Japan) Anna Ohmiya	91.7
(Sweden) Sofia Mabergs	90.2
(Scotland) Sophie Jackson (Skip)	89.2
(Norway) Eilin Kjærland	89.1
(South Korea) Seol Ye-eun	87.8
(Switzerland) Selina Witschonke	87.5
(Denmark) Denise Dupont (Note: Includes four games throwing second rocks)	87.4
(United States) Taylor Anderson-Heide	86.6
(Turkey) Berfin Şengül	85.2
(Italy) Angela Romei	84.3
(Denmark) My Larsen (Note: Played in five games)	80.7
(Lithuania) Rūta Blažienė	72.5

Seconds	%
(Scotland) Sophie Sinclair	87.7
(South Korea) Kim Su-ji	87.4
(Canada) Emma Miskew	86.9
(China) Dong Ziqi	86.6
(Switzerland) Carole Howald	86.1
(Japan) Yuna Kotani	85.3
(Sweden) Agnes Knochenhauer	85.2
(Norway) Mille Haslev Nordbye	85.0
(Italy) Elena Mathis	84.4
(Denmark) Jasmin Holtermann	81.1
(United States) Tara Peterson	78.7
(Turkey) İfayet Şafak Çalıkuşu	70.9
(Lithuania) Miglė Kiudytė	67.4

Thirds	%
(Canada) Tracy Fleury	88.1
(Switzerland) Silvana Tirinzoni (Skip)	87.1
(Sweden) Sara McManus	86.6
(South Korea) Kim Min-ji	85.6
(Norway) Marianne Rørvik (Skip)	84.8
(China) Han Yu	84.5
(Japan) Kaho Onodera	84.2
(Scotland) Jennifer Dodds	84.0
(Denmark) Mathilde Halse	81.4
(United States) Cory Thiesse	81.2
(Turkey) Öznur Polat	81.1
(Italy) Giulia Zardini Lacedelli	80.0
(Lithuania) Olga Dvojeglazova	62.0

Skips	%
(Sweden) Anna Hasselborg	87.7
(Canada) Rachel Homan	87.5
(South Korea) Gim Eun-ji	86.2
(Switzerland) Alina Pätz (Fourth)	85.8
(Scotland) Rebecca Morrison	83.9
(China) Wang Rui	83.6
(Denmark) Madeleine Dupont	80.7
(Japan) Sayaka Yoshimura	78.3
(Italy) Stefania Constantini	78.0
(United States) Tabitha Peterson	78.0
(Norway) Kristin Skaslien	75.6
(Turkey) Dilşat Yıldız	75.5
(Lithuania) Virginija Paulauskaitė	65.0

=== Perfect games ===
Minimum 10 shots thrown

Player	Team	Position	Shots	Opponent
Stefania Constantini	Italy	Skip	12	Lithuania
Anna Ohmiya	Japan	Lead	12	Denmark
Sarah Wilkes	Canada	Lead	20	South Korea
Jiang Jiayi	China	Lead	16	Lithuania
Jiang Jiayi	China	Lead	14	Scotland
Marta Lo Deserto	Italy	Lead	14	Canada
Rachel Homan	Canada	Skip	13	Italy
Silvana Tirinzoni	Switzerland	Third (Skip)	22	Denmark
Selina Witschonke	Switzerland	Lead	20	China

== Awards ==
The awards and all-star team are as follows:

All-Star Team

- Fourth: Anna Hasselborg, Sweden
- Third: Tracy Fleury, Canada
- Second: Sophie Sinclair, Scotland
- Lead: Jiang Jiayi, China

Frances Brodie Sportsmanship Award

- Alina Pätz, Switzerland

== Final standings ==
Place	Team
1st place, gold medalist(s)	Canada
2nd place, silver medalist(s)	Switzerland
3rd place, bronze medalist(s)	China
4	South Korea
5	Sweden
6	Scotland
7	Denmark
8	Norway
9	Japan
10	Italy
11	Turkey
12	United States
13	Lithuania

== National playdowns ==
- 2025 Japan Curling Championships
- (South Korea) 2024 Korean Curling Championships
- (Canada) 2025 Scotties Tournament of Hearts
- 2025 United States Women's Curling Championship
