= Virginija Paulauskaitė =

Lithuanian curler and coach (born 1972)

- Curler ♀
- Born: March 3, 1972 (age 54)

Team
- Curling club: Skipas CC, Vilnius
- Skip: Virginija Paulauskaitė
- Third: Olga Dvojeglazova
- Second: Miglė Kiudytė
- Lead: Rūta Blažienė
- Alternate: Justina Zalieckienė
- Mixed doubles partner: Tadas Vyskupaitis

Curling career
- Member Association: Lithuania
- World Championship: 1 (2025)
- World Mixed Doubles Championship: 2 (2016, 2018)
- World Mixed Championship: 1 (2015)
- European Championship: 3 (2024, 2025, 2026)
- World Senior Curling Championship: 1 (2024)
- Other appearances: European Mixed Championship: 2 (2007, 2009); European B-Group Championship: 8 (2006, 2007, 2016, 2017, 2018, 2021, 2022, 2023)
Medal record
Curling
World Senior Curling Championships
Silver medal – second place	2024 Östersund

Virginija Paulauskaitė (born 3 March 1972) is a Lithuanian curler and curling coach. Virginija started curling in 2004 and currently works as a chief manager and director of professional curling club Skipas in Vilnius. She is the current skip of the Lithuanian national women's team, was the skip of Lithuania’s first-ever world women's curling championship appearance in 2025.

== Teams ==
=== Women's ===
Season	Skip	Third	Second	Lead	Alternate	Coach	Events
2006–07	Virginija Paulauskaitė	Ruta Norkiene	Evelina Alekseijenko	Rasa Smaliukiene	Evelina Norkiene		ECC-B Group 2006 (21st)
2007–08	Virginija Paulauskaitė	Evelina Alekseijenko	Ruta Norkiene	Rasa Smaliukiene			ECC-B Group 2007 (19th)
2016–17	Virginija Paulauskaitė	Lina Januleviciute	Asta Vaicekonyte	Olga Dvojeglazova	Grazina Eitutiene	Allen Gulka	ECC-B Group 2016 (18th)
2017–18	Virginija Paulauskaitė	Lina Januleviciute	Asta Vaicekonyte	Olga Dvojeglazova	Grazina Eitutiene	Allen Gulka	ECC-B Group 2017 (17th)
2018–19	Virginija Paulauskaitė	Lina Januleviciute	Asta Vaicekonyte	Olga Dvojeglazova	Grazina Eitutiene	Ansis Regža	ECC-B Group 2018 (14th)
2019–20	Virginija Paulauskaitė	Olga Dvojeglazova	Dovile Aukstuolyte	Ruta Blaziene			
2021–22	Virginija Paulauskaitė	Olga Dvojeglazova	Dovile Aukstuolyte	Ruta Blaziene		Vygantas Zalieckas	ECC-B Group 2021 (15th)
2022–23	Virginija Paulauskaitė	Olga Dvojeglazova	Dovile Aukstuolyte	Ruta Blaziene		Vygantas Zalieckas	ECC-B Group 2022 (13th)
2023–24	Virginija Paulauskaitė	Olga Dvojeglazova	Rūta Blažienė	Justina Zalieckienė	Miglė Kiudytė	Vygantas Zalieckas	ECC-B Group 2023 (12th)
2024–25	Virginija Paulauskaitė	Olga Dvojeglazova	Miglė Kiudytė	Rūta Blažienė	Justina Zalieckienė (WCC)	Egle Cepulyte (ECC, WCC), Vygantas Zalieckas (ECC)	ECC-A Group 2024 (8th); WWCC 2025 (13th)

=== Mixed ===
Season	Skip	Third	Second	Lead	Alternate	Events
2007–08	Virginija Paulauskaitė	Vygantas Zalieckas	Evelina Alekseijenko	Paulius Kamarauskas	Piotras Gerasimovicius	EMxCC 2007 (19th)
2009–10	Virginija Paulauskaitė	Piotras Gerasimovicius	Giedre Vilcinskaite	Paulius Rymeikis		EMxCC 2009 (22nd)
2015–16	Virginija Paulauskaitė	Matas Cepulis	Lina Januleviciute	Augustas Cepla		WMxCC 2015 (32nd)

=== Mixed doubles ===
Season	Female	Male	Coach	Events
2015–16	Virginija Paulauskaitė	Tadas Vyskupaitis	Allen Gulka	WMDCC 2016 (24th)
2017–18	Virginija Paulauskaitė	Tadas Vyskupaitis	Allen Gulka	WMDCC 2018 (28th)

=== Senior's ===
Season	Skip	Third	Second	Lead	Alternate	Events
2023–24	Virginija Paulauskaitė	Rasa Jasaitiene	Jolanta Sulinskiene	Gaiva Valatkiene	Egle Cepulyte	WSCC 2024 (silver)

== Record as a coach of national teams ==
Year	Tournament, event	National team	Place
2016	2016 World Junior B Curling Championships	Lithuania (junior men)	19
2016	2016 World Senior Curling Championships	Lithuania (senior women)	17
