= Tadas Vyskupaitis =

Lithuanian curler and coach (born 1974)

- Curler ♂
- Born: 16 December 1974 (age 51)

Team
- Curling club: Skipas CC, Vilnius, T-Rink, Vilnius
- Skip: Tadas Vyskupaitis
- Third: Vytis Kulakauskas
- Second: Laurynas Telksnys
- Lead: Vidas Sadauskas
- Alternate: Paulius Rymeikis
- Mixed doubles partner: Virginija Paulauskaitė

Curling career
- Member Association: Lithuania
- World Mixed Doubles Championship: 2 (2016, 2018)
- European Championship: 10 (2009, 2010, 2011, 2012, 2013, 2014, 2015, 2016, 2017, 2018)
Medal record
Curling

Tadas Vyskupaitis (born 16 December 1974) is a Lithuanian curler and curling coach.

He started curling in 2008.

Currently he works for Lithuanian Curling Association as a Project Coordinator of 2022 European Curling Championships C-Division tournament in Vilnius at May 2022.

== Teams ==
=== Men's ===
Season	Skip	Third	Second	Lead	Alternate	Coach	Events
2009–10	Tadas Vyskupaitis	Vidas Sadauskas	Vytis Kulakauskas	Laurynas Telksnys	Vygantas Zalieckas	Vygantas Zalieckas	ECC 2009 (27th)
2010–11	Tadas Vyskupaitis	Vytis Kulakauskas	Vidas Sadauskas	Laurynas Telksnys	Vygantas Zalieckas		ECC 2010 (27th)
2011–12	Tadas Vyskupaitis	Vytis Kulakauskas	Vidas Sadauskas	Mantas Kulakauskas	Vygantas Zalieckas	Vygantas Zalieckas	ECC 2011 (22nd)
2012–13	Tadas Vyskupaitis	Vytis Kulakauskas	Vidas Sadauskas	Laurynas Telksnys	Vygantas Zalieckas		ECC 2012 (24th)
2013–14	Tadas Vyskupaitis	Vytis Kulakauskas	Laurynas Telksnys	Vidas Sadauskas	Vygantas Zalieckas		ECC 2013 (23rd)
2014–15	Mantas Kulakauskas	Konstantin Rykov	Tadas Vyskupaitis	Vytis Kulakauskas	Mantas Bielnis	Allen Gulka	ECC 2014 (23rd)
2015–16	Tadas Vyskupaitis	Vytis Kulakauskas	Laurynas Telksnys	Vidas Sadauskas	Mantas Kulakauskas	Allen Gulka	ECC 2015 (15th)
2016–17	Tadas Vyskupaitis	Vytis Kulakauskas	Laurynas Telksnys	Vidas Sadauskas	Nerijus Pacevicius	Allen Gulka	ECC 2016 (21st)
2017–18	Tadas Vyskupaitis	Vytis Kulakauskas	Laurynas Telksnys	Vidas Sadauskas	Nerijus Pacevicius	Allen Gulka	ECC 2017 (20th)
2018–19	Tadas Vyskupaitis	Vytis Kulakauskas	Laurynas Telksnys	Vidas Sadauskas	Paulius Rymeikis	Allen Gulka	ECC 2018 (20th)

=== Mixed doubles ===
Season	Female	Male	Coach	Events
2015–16	Virginija Paulauskaitė	Tadas Vyskupaitis	Allen Gulka	WMDCC 2016 (24th)
2017–18	Virginija Paulauskaitė	Tadas Vyskupaitis	Allen Gulka	WMDCC 2018 (28th)

== Record as a coach of national teams ==
Year	Tournament, event	National team	Place
2019	2016 World Mixed Doubles Curling Championship	Lithuania (mixed double)	32
