= Curling Masters Champéry =

Swiss curling tournament

The Curling Masters Champéry is an annual bonspiel, or curling tournament, that takes place at the Palladium de Champéry in Champéry, Switzerland. The tournament is held in a triple-knockout format and is part of the World Curling Tour. The tournament was started in 2011 as part of the Curling Champions Tour.

== Past champions ==
Year	Winning team	Runner up team	Purse (CHF)
2011	(Switzerland) Benoît Schwarz (Fourth), Peter de Cruz (Skip), Gilles Vuille, Valentin Tanner	(Scotland) Tom Brewster, Greg Drummond, Scott Andrews, Michael Goodfellow	40,000
2012	(Sweden) Marcus Hasselborg, Peder Folke, Andreas Prytz, Anton Sandström	(Switzerland) Benoît Schwarz (Fourth), Peter de Cruz (Skip), Dominik Märki, Valentin Tanner	40,000
2013	(Canada) James Grattan, Jason Roach, Darren Roach, Josh Barry	(Switzerland) Marc Pfister, Roger Meier, Enrico Pfister, Raphael Märki	40,000
2014	(Scotland) Tom Brewster, Glen Muirhead, Ross Paterson, Hammy McMillan Jr.	(Switzerland) Marc Pfister, Enrico Pfister, Reto Keller, Raphael Märki	40,000
2015	(Canada) James Grattan, Tommy Sullivan, Stephen Burgess, Jamie Korab	(Switzerland) Reto Keller, Andre Neuenschwander, Raphael Märki, Andri Heimann	40,000
2016	(Sweden) Niklas Edin, Oskar Eriksson, Rasmus Wranå, Christoffer Sundgren	(Switzerland) Marc Pfister, Enrico Pfister, Raphael Märki, Simon Gempeler	40,000
2017	(Sweden) Niklas Edin, Oskar Eriksson, Rasmus Wranå, Christoffer Sundgren	(Scotland) Greg Drummond, Ross Paterson, Gregor Cannon, Michael Goodfellow	45,000
2018	(Switzerland) Benoît Schwarz (Fourth), Sven Michel, Peter de Cruz (Skip), Valentin Tanner	(Scotland) Glen Muirhead, Kyle Smith, Thomas Muirhead, Cammy Smith	50,000
2019	(Netherlands) Wouter Gösgens (Fourth), Jaap van Dorp (Skip), Laurens Hoekman, Carlo Glasbergen	(Norway) Thomas Ulsrud, Steffen Walstad, Markus Høiberg, Magnus Vågberg	35,000
2020	(Switzerland) Yannick Schwaller, Michael Brunner, Romano Meier, Marcel Käufeler	(Switzerland) Marc Pfister (Fourth), Tim Jungen, Björn Jungen (Skip), Simon Gempeler	28,000
2021	(Norway) Steffen Walstad, Torger Nergård, Markus Høiberg, Magnus Vågberg	(Italy) Joël Retornaz, Amos Mosaner, Sebastiano Arman, Simone Gonin	28,000
2022	(Norway) Magnus Ramsfjell, Martin Sesaker, Bendik Ramsfjell, Gaute Nepstad	(Netherlands) Wouter Gösgens, Jaap van Dorp, Laurens Hoekman, Tobias van den Hurk, Alexander Magan	28,000
