= Bart Klomp =

Dutch curler

- Curler ♂
- Born: 25 November 1999 (age 26); Tilburg, Netherlands

Curling career
- Member Association: Netherlands
- World Championship: 1 (2019)
- Other appearances: European Youth Olympic Winter Festival: 1 (2017), World Junior-B Championships: 5 (2016, 2017, 2018, 2019 (Jan), 2019 (Dec))
Medal record
Curling
European Youth Olympic Winter Festival
| Silver medal – second place | 2017 Erzurum |

Bart Klomp (born 25 November 1999) is a Dutch curler.

== Teams ==
=== Men's ===
| Season | Skip | Third | Second | Lead | Alternate | Coach | Events |
|---|---|---|---|---|---|---|---|
| 2015–16 | Stefano Miog | Tobias van den Hurk | Jop Kuijpers | Olaf Bolkenbaas | Bart Klomp | Ezra Wiebe | WJBCC 2016 (18th) |
| 2016–17 | Tobias van den Hurk (fourth) | Jop Kuijpers | Bart Klomp | Olaf Bolkenbaas (skip) | Simon Spits | Ezra Wiebe | WJBCC 2017 (21st) |
| 2016–17 | Tobias van den Hurk (fourth) | Jop Kuijpers (skip) | Simon Spits | Bart Klomp | Joey Bruinsma | | |
| 2016–17 | Wouter Gösgens | Jop Kuijpers | Bart Klomp | Olaf Bolkenbaas | | Shari Leibbrandt-Demmon | EYOWF 2017 (silver) |
| 2017–18 | Tobias van den Hurk (fourth) | Jop Kuijpers | Bart Klomp | Olaf Bolkenbaas (skip) | Simon Spits | Joey Bruinsma | WJBCC 2018 (15th) |
| 2017–18 | Tobias van den Hurk (fourth) | Jop Kuijpers (skip) | Simon Spits | Bart Klomp | Joey Bruinsma | | |
| 2018–19 | Tobias van den Hurk (fourth) | Jop Kuijpers (skip) | Simon Spits | Bart Klomp | Maarten Spits | Joey Bruinsma (WJBCC) | WJBCC 2019 (Jan) (17th) |
| 2018–19 | Wouter Gösgens (fourth) | Jaap van Dorp (skip) | Laurens Hoekman | Carlo Glasbergen | Bart Klomp | Shari Leibbrandt-Demmon | WCC 2019 (10th) |
| 2019–20 | Tobias van den Hurk (fourth) | Bart Klomp (skip) | Simon Spits | Maarten Spits | | Joey Bruinsma | WJBCC 2019 (Dec) (13th) |

=== Mixed ===
| Season | Skip | Third | Second | Lead | Events |
|---|---|---|---|---|---|
| 2022–23 | Lisenka Bomas | Bart Klomp | Anandi Bomas | Bob Bomas | WMxCC 2022 (27th) |
