= Vanessa Tonoli =

Swiss and Dutch curler

- Curler ♀

Team
- Curling club: (Switzerland) CC Flims (Flims) (Netherlands) Team Bomas
- Skip: Vanessa Tonoli (fourth)
- Third: Lisenka Bomas (skip)
- Second: Anandi Bomas
- Lead: Marit van Valkenhoef
- Alternate: Linde Nas
- Mixed doubles partner: Wouter Gösgens

Curling career
- Member Association: Switzerland; Netherlands
- World Mixed Doubles Championship: 2 (2023, 2024)
- European Championship: 2 (2024, 2025)
- Other appearances: World Junior Championships: 1 (2019)
Medal record
Curling
Representing Switzerland
World Junior Championships
Bronze medal – third place	2019 Liverpool
Swiss Women's Championship
Gold medal – first place	2016 Flims
Silver medal – second place	2017 Flims

Vanessa Tonoli is a Dutch female curler. She represents Swiss before 2020.

At the international level, she competed for Switzerland at the World junior championships, and for the Netherlands at the European championships and the World mixed doubles championships.

At the national level, she is a Swiss women's champion curler (2016), and a Dutch mixed doubles runner-up curler with Alexander Magan (2023).

As of 2025, she plays fourth for Lisenka Bomas.

== Teams and events ==
=== Women's ===
Season	Skip	Third	Second	Lead	Alternate	Coach	Events
Switzerland
2015–16	Binia Feltscher	Irene Schori	Franziska Kaufmann	Christine Urech	Vanessa Tonoli	Carole Howald	SWCC 2016 (gold)
2016–17	Binia Feltscher	Irene Schori	Franziska Kaufmann	Carole Howald	Vanessa Tonoli		SWCC 2017 (silver)
2017–18	Raphaela Keiser	Laura Engler	Vanessa Tonoli	Nehla Meier			
2017–18	Raphaela Keiser	Laura Engler	Vanessa Tonoli	Nehla Meier			
2018–19	Selina Witschonke (Fourth)	Raphaela Keiser (Skip)	Laura Engler	Vanessa Tonoli	Nehla Meier	Stephan Keiser	WJCC 2019 (bronze)
Netherlands
2024–25	Vanessa Tonoli (fourth)	Lisenka Bomas (skip)	Linde Nas	Marit van Valkenhoef	Anandi Bomas	Shannon Kleibrink	ECC 2024 (14th)
2025–26	Vanessa Tonoli (fourth)	Lisenka Bomas (skip)	Anandi Bomas	Marit van Valkenhoef	Linde Nas	Violetta Caldart	ECC 2025 (19th)

=== Mixed doubles ===
Season	Female	Male	Coach	Events
2019–20	Vanessa Tonoli	Alexander Magan		
2022–23	Vanessa Tonoli	Alexander Magan		DMDCC 2023 (silver)
2022–23	Vanessa Tonoli	Wouter Gösgens	Shari Leibbrandt	WMDCC 2023 (14th)
2023–24	Vanessa Tonoli	Wouter Gösgens	Shari Leibbrandt	WMDCC 2024 (13th)
