= Lisenka Bomas =

Dutch curler

- Curler ♀

Team
- Mixed doubles partner: Wouter Gösgens

Curling career
- Member Association: Netherlands
- World Mixed Doubles Championship: 5 (2018, 2019, 2025, 2026, 2027)
- World Mixed Championship: 2 (2022, 2024)
- European Championship: 2 (2023, 2024)
Medal record
Curling

Lisenka Bomas is a Dutch female curler.

At the international level, she competed for The Netherlands at the European championships, the World mixed championships and the World mixed doubles championships.

At the national level, she is a Dutch mixed doubles champion curler with Wouter Gösgens.

As of 2025, she skips her own team.

== Teams and events ==
=== Women's ===
Season	Skip	Third	Second	Lead	Alternate	Coach	Events
2022–23	Lisenka Bomas	Anandi Bomas	Marit van Valkenhoef	Linde Nas		Bob Bomas	WJBCC 2022 (Dec.) (15th)
2023–24	Lisenka Bomas	Marit van Valkenhoef	Anandi Bomas	Linde Nas		Shari Leibbrandt	WJBCC 2023 (14th)
2023–24	Lisenka Bomas	Marit van Valkenhoef	Anandi Bomas	Linde Nas	Kimberly Glasbergen-Honders	Carlo Glasbergen	ECC 2023 (25th)
2024–25	Vanessa Tonoli (fourth)	Lisenka Bomas (skip)	Linde Nas	Marit van Valkenhoef	Anandi Bomas	Shannon Kleibrink	ECC 2024 (14th)
2025–26	Vanessa Tonoli (fourth)	Lisenka Bomas (skip)	Anandi Bomas	Marit van Valkenhoef	Linde Nas	Violetta Caldart	ECC 2025 (19th)

=== Mixed ===
Season	Skip	Third	Second	Lead	Coach	Events
2022–23	Lisenka Bomas	Bart Klomp	Anandi Bomas	Bob Bomas		WMxCC 2022 (27th)
2024–25	Simon Spits	Lisenka Bomas	Floris Ros	Anandi Bomas	Bob Bomas	WMxCC 2024 (5th)

=== Mixed doubles ===
Season	Female	Male	Coach	Events
2013–14	Lisenka Bomas	Bob Bomas		WMDCC 2018 (38th)
2018–19	Lisenka Bomas	Bob Bomas	Shari Leibbrandt	WMDCC 2019 (43th)
2019–20	Lisenka Bomas	Bob Bomas	Clancy Grandy	WMDQE 2019 (16th)
2022–23	Lisenka Bomas	Wouter Gösgens		DMDCC 2023 (gold)
2022–23	Lisenka Bomas	Wouter Gösgens	Shari Leibbrandt, Bob Bomas	WMDQE 2022 (bronze)
2024–25	Lisenka Bomas	Wouter Gösgens	Shari Leibbrandt	WMDCC 2025 (19th)
2025–26	Lisenka Bomas	Wouter Gösgens	Shari Leibbrandt	WMDCC 2026 (13th)
