= 2024 World Men's Curling Championship =

2024 edition of the World Men's Curling Championship

- Host city: Schaffhausen, Switzerland
- Arena: KSS Sports Complex
- Dates: March 30 – April 7
- Winner: Sweden
- Curling club: Karlstads CK, Karlstad
- Skip: Niklas Edin
- Third: Oskar Eriksson
- Second: Rasmus Wranå
- Lead: Christoffer Sundgren
- Alternate: Daniel Magnusson
- Coach: Alexander Lindström
- Finalist: Canada (Gushue)

The 2024 World Men's Curling Championship (65th) (branded as the 2024 LGT World Men's Curling Championship for sponsorship reasons) was held from March 30 to April 7 at the KSS Sports Complex in Schaffhausen, Switzerland. This was the first time a world curling championship had been held in Schaffhausen, as the 2021 World Women's Curling Championship was originally awarded to Schaffhausen before being relocated to Calgary, due to the COVID-19 pandemic.

This was the tenth time Switzerland hosted a world men's or women's curling championship, with the last being the 2016 World Men's Curling Championship in Basel.

The format for the Championship featured a thirteen team round robin. The top six teams qualify for the playoff round, where the top two teams receive a bye, while the remaining four teams play in the qualification round to advance to the semifinals.

== Summary ==
Canada skip Brad Gushue won his 50th career game when Canada defeated New Zealand 7–4 in their game on 2 April.

In Draw 15 action on the morning of 4 April, both Canada (8–1 record) and undefeated (9–0) Sweden (skipped by Niklas Edin) were the first teams to clinch berths into the playoffs, following victories over Norway (Magnus Ramsfjell) and the United States (John Shuster), respectively. Later in the day, defending champions Scotland (Bruce Mouat) also clinched a berth after defeating hosts Switzerland (Yannick Schwaller) in an extra end.

Sweden had secured the first direct bye to the semifinals going into the final day of the round robin competition on 5 April, having won against South Korea before being handed their first loss by Scotland in their final game. Victories over New Zealand and Czechia allowed the United States (John Shuster) to qualify for the playoffs, with Germany (Marc Muskatewitz) also qualifying with wins over Italy and Switzerland, eliminating the latter from contention. Italy, despite losing to the Germans earlier, secured the final playoff spot with a win over Norway. Thanks to dominant six-end victories over Japan and Switzerland, Canada earned the second direct bye to the semifinals.

In the playoffs, Italy defeated Germany 8–3 while Scotland defeated the United States 8–4 in the qualifying games. In the first semifinal, the game between Canada and Scotland remained close for the first 5 ends, tied 3–3 going into the second half; however, some mistakes from the Scots in the 6th end, including a missed draw for a point by Mouat, allowed Canada to steal 3 points and take control of the game. After forcing Scotland to 1 in the 7th, Gushue drew on his last shot in the 8th to score 3 more points, and Scotland conceded, giving Canada a 9-4 victory. Meanwhile, Sweden defeated Italy in the other semifinal 5-3, setting up the 4th matchup in the final between Gushue and Edin, dating back to 2017.

In the final, Sweden defeated Canada 6–5, giving Edin a record seventh World Championship title. Sweden got on the board first, scoring a deuce in the second end, which was set up by a long hit and roll behind cover by Sweden's third Oskar Eriksson. Eriksson made another great shot in the third, with a hit and roll. Gushue ticked on a guard in an attempt to blank the end on his last, giving up a steal to go down 3–0 after three. Canada rallied back to tie the game at 5 heading into the 10th and final end, which would decide the game, with Sweden having the hammer. On his last rock, Gushue made a short runback to sit three, leaving Edin's only way to score being a tough wide draw to get a full piece of the four-foot. Edin made the draw, with his rock settling in the back-four, breaking the 5–5 tie. It was a fourth straight silver medal for Canada's Brad Gushue.

Italy won the bronze medal in an extra end, defeating Scotland 7–6 after being down 6–3 after 9.

== Qualification ==
Thirteen curling federations qualified to participate in the 2024 World Men's Curling Championship.

Means of Qualification	Vacancies	Qualified
Host Nation	1	Switzerland
2023 Pan Continental Curling Championships	5	Canada; South Korea; Japan; United States; New Zealand
2023 European Curling Championships	7	Scotland; Sweden; Italy; Norway; Germany; Netherlands; Czech Republic
TOTAL	13	

== Teams ==
The teams are as follows:

Canada	Czech Republic	Germany	Italy	Japan
St. John's CC, St. John's Skip: Brad Gushue; Third: Mark Nichols; Second: E.J. Harnden; Lead: Geoff Walker; Alternate: Kyle Doering	CC Zbraslav & CC Dion, Prague Skip: Lukáš Klíma; Third: Marek Černovský; Second: Martin Jurík; Lead: Lukáš Klípa; Alternate: Radek Boháč	CC Füssen, Füssen Skip: Marc Muskatewitz; Third: Benjamin Kapp; Second: Felix Messenzehl; Lead: Johannes Scheuerl; Alternate: Mario Trevisiol	Trentino Curling Cembra, Cembra Skip: Joël Retornaz; Third: Amos Mosaner; Second: Sebastiano Arman; Lead: Mattia Giovanella; Alternate: Francesco De Zanna	Tokoro CC, Tokoro Fourth: Tetsuro Shimizu; Skip: Shinya Abe; Second: Haruto Ouchi; Lead: Sota Tsuruga; Alternate: Asei Nakahara
Netherlands	New Zealand	Norway	Scotland	South Korea
CC PWA Zoetermeer, Zoetermeer Skip: Wouter Gösgens; Third: Laurens Hoekman; Second: Jaap van Dorp; Lead: Alexander Magan; Alternate: Tobias van den Hurk	Maniototo CI, Naseby & Alexandra CR, Alexandra Skip: Anton Hood; Third: Ben Smith; Second: Brett Sargon; Lead: Hunter Walker; Alternate: Peter de Boer	Trondheim CK, Trondheim Skip: Magnus Ramsfjell; Third: Martin Sesaker; Second: Bendik Ramsfjell; Lead: Gaute Nepstad; Alternate: Wilhelm Næss	Curl Edinburgh, Edinburgh Skip: Bruce Mouat; Third: Grant Hardie; Second: Bobby Lammie; Lead: Hammy McMillan Jr. Alternate: Kyle Waddell	Gangwon Curling, Gangwon Province Skip: Park Jong-duk; Third: Jeong Yeong-seok; Second: Oh Seung-hoon; Lead: Seong Ji-hoon; Alternate: Lee Ki-bok
Sweden	Switzerland	United States		
Karlstads CK, Karlstad Skip: Niklas Edin; Third: Oskar Eriksson; Second: Rasmus Wranå; Lead: Christoffer Sundgren; Alternate: Daniel Magnusson	CC Genève, Geneva Fourth: Benoît Schwarz-van Berkel; Skip: Yannick Schwaller; Second: Sven Michel; Lead: Pablo Lachat-Couchepin; Alternate: Tom Winkelhausen	Duluth CC, Duluth Skip: John Shuster; Third: Chris Plys; Second: Colin Hufman; Lead: John Landsteiner; Alternate: Matt Hamilton		

=== WCF ranking ===
Year to date World Curling Federation order of merit ranking for each team before the event.

Nation (Skip)	Rank	Points
Italy (Retornaz)	1	393.4
Scotland (Mouat)	2	367.3
Switzerland (Schwaller)	5	305.8
Canada (Gushue)	6	286.8
Sweden (Edin)	7	240.6
United States (Shuster)	15	171.8
Norway (Ramsfjell)	17	155.3
South Korea (Park)	26	124.3
Netherlands (Gösgens)	31	105.7
Germany (Muskatewitz)	32	103.6
Japan (Abe)	48	68.3
Czech Republic (Klíma)	63	50.4
New Zealand (Hood)	131	15.2

== Round robin standings ==
Final Round Robin Standings

Key
Teams to Playoffs

Country	Skip	W	L	W–L	PF	PA	EW	EL	BE	SE	S%	DSC
Sweden	Niklas Edin	11	1	–	94	65	56	41	7	11	87.8%	14.63
Canada	Brad Gushue	10	2	1–0	89	52	55	39	5	15	89.2%	17.79
Scotland	Bruce Mouat	10	2	0–1	90	59	51	42	6	9	87.0%	24.49
Germany	Marc Muskatewitz	8	4	1–0	81	71	53	44	8	16	84.0%	25.53
Italy	Joël Retornaz	8	4	0–1	80	66	48	48	8	8	86.7%	30.95
United States	John Shuster	7	5	–	74	60	47	40	9	16	85.2%	25.92
Switzerland	Yannick Schwaller	6	6	–	81	70	47	52	6	6	87.2%	15.44
Netherlands	Wouter Gösgens	5	7	–	66	78	47	46	8	11	81.3%	24.20
Czech Republic	Lukáš Klíma	4	8	1–0	75	82	46	54	6	6	79.6%	32.15
Norway	Magnus Ramsfjell	4	8	0–1	75	94	46	54	3	6	82.8%	30.52
Japan	Shinya Abe	3	9	–	64	87	44	51	11	9	81.1%	48.84
South Korea	Park Jong-duk	2	10	–	66	97	46	54	8	5	80.3%	23.06
New Zealand	Anton Hood	0	12	–	45	99	33	54	7	2	74.4%	34.17

Round Robin Summary Table
Pos.	Country	Canada	Czech Republic	Germany	Italy	Japan	Netherlands	New Zealand	Norway	Scotland	South Korea	Sweden	Switzerland	United States	Record
2	Canada	—	9–8	8–5	6–7	9–3	7–4	7–4	7–4	8–4	7–4	5–6	8–1	8–2	10–2
9	Czech Republic	8–9	—	4–6	7–8	8–6	5–8	7–4	10–8	3–6	10–6	6–8	4–7	3–6	4–8
4	Germany	5–8	6–4	—	8–7	8–1	9–4	9–2	6–8	8–7	8–6	5–8	7–6	2–10	8–4
5	Italy	7–6	8–7	7–8	—	6–4	8–5	10–4	8–2	3–8	8–5	5–7	6–5	4–5	8–4
11	Japan	3–9	6–8	1–8	4–6	—	5–7	8–3	7–4	5–7	10–11	5–9	4–10	6–5	3–9
8	Netherlands	4–7	8–5	4–9	5–8	7–5	—	7–5	6–8	3–5	9–4	1–8	5–8	7–6	5–7
13	New Zealand	4–7	4–7	2–9	4–10	3–8	5–7	—	5–9	2–8	2–5	7–11	3–8	4–10	0–12
10	Norway	4–7	8–10	8–6	2–8	4–7	8–6	9–5	—	8–9	8–7	8–10	5–10	3–9	4–8
3	Scotland	4–8	6–3	7–8	8–3	7–5	5–3	8–2	9–8	—	10–3	8–6	8–7	10–3	10–2
12	South Korea	4–7	6–10	6–8	5–8	11–10	4–9	5–2	7–8	3–10	—	4–7	7–9	4–9	2–10
1	Sweden	6–5	8–6	8–5	7–5	9–5	8–1	11–7	10–8	6–8	7–4	—	8–7	6–4	11–1
7	Switzerland	1–8	7–4	6–7	5–6	10–4	8–5	8–3	10–5	7–8	9–7	7–8	—	3–5	6–6
6	United States	2–8	6–3	10–2	5–4	5–6	6–7	10–4	9–3	3–10	9–4	4–6	5–3	—	7–5

== Round robin results ==
All draw times are listed in Central European Time (UTC+01:00).

=== Draw 1 ===
Saturday, March 30, 2:00 pm

Sheet A	1	2	3	4	5	6	7	8	9	10	Final
Scotland (Mouat) 🔨	2	0	3	0	3	0	2	X	X	X	10
South Korea (Park)	0	1	0	1	0	1	0	X	X	X	3

Sheet B	1	2	3	4	5	6	7	8	9	10	11	Final
Czech Republic (Klíma)	0	2	0	1	0	3	0	0	0	2	0	8
Canada (Gushue) 🔨	1	0	1	0	3	0	2	0	1	0	1	9

Sheet C	1	2	3	4	5	6	7	8	9	10	Final
Sweden (Edin) 🔨	2	0	3	1	1	0	1	X	X	X	8
Netherlands (Gösgens)	0	0	0	0	0	1	0	X	X	X	1

Sheet D	1	2	3	4	5	6	7	8	9	10	Final
Switzerland (Schwaller) 🔨	0	0	0	0	0	0	2	0	1	0	3
United States (Shuster)	0	1	0	0	1	1	0	1	0	1	5

=== Draw 2 ===
Saturday, March 30, 7:00 pm

Sheet A	1	2	3	4	5	6	7	8	9	10	Final
New Zealand (Hood)	0	2	0	0	0	1	2	0	0	X	5
Norway (Ramsfjell) 🔨	2	0	2	0	0	0	0	4	1	X	9

Sheet B	1	2	3	4	5	6	7	8	9	10	Final
Scotland (Mouat) 🔨	3	2	0	0	1	0	2	2	X	X	10
United States (Shuster)	0	0	1	1	0	1	0	0	X	X	3

Sheet C	1	2	3	4	5	6	7	8	9	10	Final
Japan (Abe)	0	0	0	0	0	1	0	2	0	1	4
Italy (Retornaz) 🔨	0	2	0	0	0	0	1	0	3	0	6

Sheet D	1	2	3	4	5	6	7	8	9	10	Final
Germany (Muskatewitz)	0	0	2	0	0	1	0	0	2	0	5
Canada (Gushue) 🔨	2	0	0	2	0	0	1	2	0	1	8

=== Draw 3 ===
Sunday, March 31, 9:00 am

Sheet A	1	2	3	4	5	6	7	8	9	10	Final
Italy (Retornaz)	0	2	0	3	0	2	0	1	0	0	8
Czech Republic (Klíma) 🔨	1	0	1	0	0	0	2	0	2	1	7

Sheet B	1	2	3	4	5	6	7	8	9	10	Final
Norway (Ramsfjell)	0	1	0	1	0	2	0	1	0	X	5
Switzerland (Schwaller) 🔨	0	0	2	0	3	0	2	0	3	X	10

Sheet C	1	2	3	4	5	6	7	8	9	10	Final
South Korea (Park) 🔨	1	0	0	1	1	0	0	2	1	0	6
Germany (Muskatewitz)	0	1	0	0	0	4	1	0	0	2	8

Sheet D	1	2	3	4	5	6	7	8	9	10	Final
Japan (Abe)	0	0	2	0	2	0	1	0	X	X	5
Sweden (Edin) 🔨	2	0	0	1	0	2	0	4	X	X	9

=== Draw 4 ===
Sunday, March 31, 2:00 pm

Sheet A	1	2	3	4	5	6	7	8	9	10	11	Final
Switzerland (Schwaller) 🔨	0	1	2	0	1	0	1	0	0	2	0	7
Sweden (Edin)	0	0	0	2	0	2	0	2	1	0	1	8

Sheet B	1	2	3	4	5	6	7	8	9	10	Final
Netherlands (Gösgens) 🔨	0	2	0	3	0	2	1	1	X	X	9
South Korea (Park)	1	0	2	0	1	0	0	0	X	X	4

Sheet C	1	2	3	4	5	6	7	8	9	10	Final
Canada (Gushue) 🔨	0	2	0	0	2	0	2	0	2	X	8
Scotland (Mouat)	0	0	1	0	0	1	0	2	0	X	4

Sheet D	1	2	3	4	5	6	7	8	9	10	Final
Czech Republic (Klíma)	1	0	2	0	1	0	0	2	1	X	7
New Zealand (Hood) 🔨	0	1	0	2	0	0	1	0	0	X	4

=== Draw 5 ===
Sunday, March 31, 7:00 pm

Sheet A	1	2	3	4	5	6	7	8	9	10	Final
Germany (Muskatewitz)	0	3	0	1	0	1	0	3	1	X	9
Netherlands (Gösgens) 🔨	0	0	1	0	1	0	2	0	0	X	4

Sheet B	1	2	3	4	5	6	7	8	9	10	Final
New Zealand (Hood) 🔨	0	0	0	1	0	2	0	X	X	X	3
Japan (Abe)	1	2	1	0	1	0	3	X	X	X	8

Sheet C	1	2	3	4	5	6	7	8	9	10	Final
United States (Shuster)	1	0	2	2	4	0	X	X	X	X	9
Norway (Ramsfjell) 🔨	0	2	0	0	0	1	X	X	X	X	3

Sheet D	1	2	3	4	5	6	7	8	9	10	Final
Italy (Retornaz)	0	0	2	0	0	1	0	X	X	X	3
Scotland (Mouat) 🔨	3	0	0	1	3	0	1	X	X	X	8

=== Draw 6 ===
Monday, April 1, 9:00 am

Sheet A	1	2	3	4	5	6	7	8	9	10	Final
South Korea (Park) 🔨	0	0	1	0	2	0	1	0	X	X	4
United States (Shuster)	0	2	0	2	0	2	0	3	X	X	9

Sheet B	1	2	3	4	5	6	7	8	9	10	Final
Sweden (Edin) 🔨	1	0	1	0	3	0	0	1	2	X	8
Czech Republic (Klíma)	0	2	0	2	0	0	2	0	0	X	6

Sheet C	1	2	3	4	5	6	7	8	9	10	Final
Germany (Muskatewitz) 🔨	1	1	0	1	2	0	2	1	X	X	8
Japan (Abe)	0	0	0	0	0	1	0	0	X	X	1

=== Draw 7 ===
Monday, April 1, 2:00 pm

Sheet A	1	2	3	4	5	6	7	8	9	10	11	Final
Sweden (Edin) 🔨	2	0	2	0	1	0	1	0	0	2	2	10
Norway (Ramsfjell)	0	2	0	3	0	1	0	2	0	0	0	8

Sheet B	1	2	3	4	5	6	7	8	9	10	11	Final
Canada (Gushue)	0	0	1	0	1	1	0	1	0	2	0	6
Italy (Retornaz) 🔨	0	2	0	1	0	0	1	0	2	0	1	7

Sheet C	1	2	3	4	5	6	7	8	9	10	Final
Scotland (Mouat)	3	0	2	0	0	3	X	X	X	X	8
New Zealand (Hood) 🔨	0	1	0	1	0	0	X	X	X	X	2

Sheet D	1	2	3	4	5	6	7	8	9	10	Final
Netherlands (Gösgens)	0	1	1	0	3	0	0	0	0	X	5
Switzerland (Schwaller) 🔨	2	0	0	2	0	2	1	1	0	X	8

=== Draw 8 ===
Monday, April 1, 7:00 pm

Sheet A	1	2	3	4	5	6	7	8	9	10	Final
Japan (Abe) 🔨	2	0	0	1	0	1	1	0	1	0	6
Czech Republic (Klíma)	0	2	0	0	1	0	0	2	0	3	8

Sheet B	1	2	3	4	5	6	7	8	9	10	Final
United States (Shuster) 🔨	3	0	0	1	0	1	0	1	0	0	6
Netherlands (Gösgens)	0	1	0	0	1	0	1	0	3	1	7

Sheet C	1	2	3	4	5	6	7	8	9	10	Final
Italy (Retornaz)	1	0	0	3	0	1	0	2	0	1	8
South Korea (Park) 🔨	0	0	2	0	1	0	1	0	1	0	5

Sheet D	1	2	3	4	5	6	7	8	9	10	Final
Norway (Ramsfjell) 🔨	2	0	0	1	0	2	0	2	0	1	8
Germany (Muskatewitz)	0	1	0	0	2	0	1	0	2	0	6

=== Draw 9 ===
Tuesday, April 2, 9:00 am

Sheet B	1	2	3	4	5	6	7	8	9	10	Final
Czech Republic (Klíma) 🔨	1	1	0	0	4	0	3	0	1	X	10
South Korea (Park)	0	0	0	2	0	2	0	2	0	X	6

Sheet C	1	2	3	4	5	6	7	8	9	10	Final
Switzerland (Schwaller) 🔨	2	0	0	1	2	0	2	0	3	X	10
Japan (Abe)	0	0	1	0	0	1	0	2	0	X	4

Sheet D	1	2	3	4	5	6	7	8	9	10	Final
New Zealand (Hood) 🔨	1	0	1	0	0	0	1	0	1	X	4
Canada (Gushue)	0	1	0	1	1	2	0	2	0	X	7

=== Draw 10 ===
Tuesday, April 2, 2:00 pm

Sheet A	1	2	3	4	5	6	7	8	9	10	Final
Norway (Ramsfjell)	1	0	2	0	3	0	2	0	0	X	8
Netherlands (Gösgens) 🔨	0	1	0	1	0	2	0	1	1	X	6

Sheet B	1	2	3	4	5	6	7	8	9	10	Final
Germany (Muskatewitz) 🔨	1	0	0	0	2	1	0	2	0	2	8
Scotland (Mouat)	0	2	0	2	0	0	2	0	1	0	7

Sheet C	1	2	3	4	5	6	7	8	9	10	Final
New Zealand (Hood)	0	2	0	3	1	0	0	1	0	0	7
Sweden (Edin) 🔨	2	0	3	0	0	3	0	0	1	2	11

Sheet D	1	2	3	4	5	6	7	8	9	10	Final
United States (Shuster) 🔨	1	0	0	0	1	0	2	0	0	1	5
Italy (Retornaz)	0	0	1	0	0	2	0	1	0	0	4

=== Draw 11 ===
Tuesday, April 2, 7:00 pm

Sheet A	1	2	3	4	5	6	7	8	9	10	Final
Canada (Gushue) 🔨	3	0	1	1	3	0	X	X	X	X	8
United States (Shuster)	0	1	0	0	0	1	X	X	X	X	2

Sheet B	1	2	3	4	5	6	7	8	9	10	Final
Japan (Abe)	0	0	2	0	3	0	1	0	1	X	7
Norway (Ramsfjell) 🔨	0	1	0	1	0	1	0	1	0	X	4

Sheet C	1	2	3	4	5	6	7	8	9	10	Final
Czech Republic (Klíma)	0	1	0	1	0	0	0	0	2	0	4
Germany (Muskatewitz) 🔨	0	0	1	0	1	1	1	1	0	1	6

Sheet D	1	2	3	4	5	6	7	8	9	10	Final
South Korea (Park) 🔨	3	0	1	0	1	0	1	0	1	0	7
Switzerland (Schwaller)	0	1	0	1	0	2	0	2	0	3	9

=== Draw 12 ===
Wednesday, April 3, 9:00 am

Sheet A	1	2	3	4	5	6	7	8	9	10	Final
Italy (Retornaz)	0	1	0	0	2	0	0	0	2	0	5
Sweden (Edin) 🔨	2	0	1	1	0	1	0	0	0	2	7

Sheet B	1	2	3	4	5	6	7	8	9	10	Final
Switzerland (Schwaller) 🔨	2	0	0	2	0	2	0	2	X	X	8
New Zealand (Hood)	0	0	1	0	1	0	1	0	X	X	3

Sheet C	1	2	3	4	5	6	7	8	9	10	Final
Netherlands (Gösgens)	0	0	1	0	1	0	1	0	1	0	4
Canada (Gushue) 🔨	2	1	0	0	0	1	0	2	0	1	7

Sheet D	1	2	3	4	5	6	7	8	9	10	Final
Scotland (Mouat)	0	2	0	0	0	2	0	0	0	2	6
Czech Republic (Klíma) 🔨	1	0	1	0	0	0	0	1	0	0	3

=== Draw 13 ===
Wednesday, April 3, 2:00 pm

Sheet A	1	2	3	4	5	6	7	8	9	10	Final
Germany (Muskatewitz) 🔨	0	2	3	0	2	2	X	X	X	X	9
New Zealand (Hood)	0	0	0	2	0	0	X	X	X	X	2

Sheet B	1	2	3	4	5	6	7	8	9	10	Final
Italy (Retornaz) 🔨	2	0	0	3	0	0	3	0	X	X	8
Netherlands (Gösgens)	0	0	3	0	1	0	0	1	X	X	5

Sheet C	1	2	3	4	5	6	7	8	9	10	11	Final
Norway (Ramsfjell)	0	0	2	0	0	2	0	2	1	0	1	8
South Korea (Park) 🔨	0	2	0	1	1	0	1	0	0	2	0	7

Sheet D	1	2	3	4	5	6	7	8	9	10	Final
United States (Shuster)	1	0	0	0	1	1	1	0	1	0	5
Japan (Abe) 🔨	0	1	2	1	0	0	0	2	0	0	6

=== Draw 14 ===
Wednesday, April 3, 7:00 pm

Sheet A	1	2	3	4	5	6	7	8	9	10	Final
Czech Republic (Klíma)	0	0	1	0	1	0	1	0	1	X	4
Switzerland (Schwaller) 🔨	1	1	0	2	0	2	0	1	0	X	7

Sheet B	1	2	3	4	5	6	7	8	9	10	Final
South Korea (Park)	0	1	0	2	0	0	1	0	0	X	4
Canada (Gushue) 🔨	2	0	2	0	0	2	0	1	0	X	7

Sheet C	1	2	3	4	5	6	7	8	9	10	Final
Japan (Abe) 🔨	1	1	0	1	0	0	1	0	1	0	5
Scotland (Mouat)	0	0	1	0	1	1	0	3	0	1	7

Sheet D	1	2	3	4	5	6	7	8	9	10	Final
Sweden (Edin) 🔨	0	2	0	0	0	2	0	2	0	2	8
Germany (Muskatewitz)	0	0	0	0	1	0	1	0	3	0	5

=== Draw 15 ===
Thursday, April 4, 9:00 am

Sheet A	1	2	3	4	5	6	7	8	9	10	Final
Netherlands (Gösgens) 🔨	0	1	0	0	1	0	1	0	0	X	3
Scotland (Mouat)	0	0	1	0	0	3	0	1	0	X	5

Sheet B	1	2	3	4	5	6	7	8	9	10	Final
United States (Shuster) 🔨	0	1	0	0	1	0	0	2	0	0	4
Sweden (Edin)	0	0	0	2	0	1	0	0	2	1	6

Sheet C	1	2	3	4	5	6	7	8	9	10	Final
New Zealand (Hood) 🔨	1	0	0	0	2	0	1	0	0	X	4
Italy (Retornaz)	0	2	2	1	0	2	0	1	2	X	10

Sheet D	1	2	3	4	5	6	7	8	9	10	Final
Canada (Gushue) 🔨	0	2	0	2	0	1	1	0	1	X	7
Norway (Ramsfjell)	1	0	1	0	1	0	0	1	0	X	4

=== Draw 16 ===
Thursday, April 4, 2:00 pm

Sheet A	1	2	3	4	5	6	7	8	9	10	11	Final
South Korea (Park) 🔨	6	0	2	0	1	0	0	0	1	0	1	11
Japan (Abe)	0	1	0	2	0	2	1	2	0	2	0	10

Sheet B	1	2	3	4	5	6	7	8	9	10	Final
Norway (Ramsfjell)	0	0	2	0	0	2	0	2	2	0	8
Czech Republic (Klíma) 🔨	2	0	0	0	4	0	2	0	0	2	10

Sheet C	1	2	3	4	5	6	7	8	9	10	Final
Germany (Muskatewitz) 🔨	1	0	1	0	0	0	0	0	X	X	2
United States (Shuster)	0	1	0	0	2	1	3	3	X	X	10

Sheet D	1	2	3	4	5	6	7	8	9	10	Final
Switzerland (Schwaller)	0	1	0	1	0	2	0	1	0	0	5
Italy (Retornaz) 🔨	1	0	2	0	1	0	0	0	1	1	6

=== Draw 17 ===
Thursday, April 4, 7:00 pm

Sheet A	1	2	3	4	5	6	7	8	9	10	Final
Sweden (Edin) 🔨	0	3	0	1	0	0	1	1	0	0	6
Canada (Gushue)	0	0	1	0	1	0	0	0	2	1	5

Sheet B	1	2	3	4	5	6	7	8	9	10	11	Final
Scotland (Mouat) 🔨	3	0	1	0	1	0	0	1	1	0	1	8
Switzerland (Schwaller)	0	1	0	2	0	3	0	0	0	1	0	7

Sheet C	1	2	3	4	5	6	7	8	9	10	Final
Netherlands (Gösgens)	0	0	2	1	0	2	1	1	0	1	8
Czech Republic (Klíma) 🔨	0	1	0	0	2	0	0	0	2	0	5

Sheet D	1	2	3	4	5	6	7	8	9	10	Final
New Zealand (Hood)	0	0	0	0	1	0	0	1	0	X	2
South Korea (Park) 🔨	0	1	1	0	0	0	2	0	1	X	5

=== Draw 18 ===
Friday, April 5, 9:00 am

Sheet A	1	2	3	4	5	6	7	8	9	10	Final
United States (Shuster) 🔨	3	0	2	0	0	2	0	3	X	X	10
New Zealand (Hood)	0	1	0	2	0	0	1	0	X	X	4

Sheet B	1	2	3	4	5	6	7	8	9	10	11	Final
Italy (Retornaz) 🔨	0	0	1	0	1	1	0	3	0	1	0	7
Germany (Muskatewitz)	2	1	0	2	0	0	1	0	1	0	1	8

Sheet C	1	2	3	4	5	6	7	8	9	10	11	Final
Scotland (Mouat) 🔨	2	0	3	0	0	1	0	1	1	0	1	9
Norway (Ramsfjell)	0	2	0	2	0	0	2	0	0	2	0	8

Sheet D	1	2	3	4	5	6	7	8	9	10	Final
Japan (Abe) 🔨	0	0	2	0	0	0	2	0	1	0	5
Netherlands (Gösgens)	0	0	0	3	0	1	0	2	0	1	7

=== Draw 19 ===
Friday, April 5, 2:00 pm

Sheet A	1	2	3	4	5	6	7	8	9	10	Final
Switzerland (Schwaller)	0	2	0	3	0	1	0	0	0	0	6
Germany (Muskatewitz) 🔨	1	0	3	0	1	0	0	1	0	1	7

Sheet B	1	2	3	4	5	6	7	8	9	10	Final
Canada (Gushue)	1	0	3	4	1	0	X	X	X	X	9
Japan (Abe) 🔨	0	1	0	0	0	2	X	X	X	X	3

Sheet C	1	2	3	4	5	6	7	8	9	10	Final
South Korea (Park)	0	1	0	0	2	0	1	0	0	X	4
Sweden (Edin) 🔨	2	0	2	1	0	1	0	0	1	X	7

Sheet D	1	2	3	4	5	6	7	8	9	10	Final
Czech Republic (Klíma)	1	0	0	1	0	0	0	0	1	X	3
United States (Shuster) 🔨	0	2	2	0	0	0	1	1	0	X	6

=== Draw 20 ===
Friday, April 5, 7:00 pm

Sheet A	1	2	3	4	5	6	7	8	9	10	Final
Norway (Ramsfjell)	0	1	0	0	1	0	X	X	X	X	2
Italy (Retornaz) 🔨	2	0	3	2	0	1	X	X	X	X	8

Sheet B	1	2	3	4	5	6	7	8	9	10	Final
Netherlands (Gösgens) 🔨	0	3	0	1	0	1	0	1	0	1	7
New Zealand (Hood)	0	0	2	0	1	0	2	0	0	0	5

Sheet C	1	2	3	4	5	6	7	8	9	10	Final
Canada (Gushue) 🔨	0	4	1	2	0	1	X	X	X	X	8
Switzerland (Schwaller)	0	0	0	0	1	0	X	X	X	X	1

Sheet D	1	2	3	4	5	6	7	8	9	10	Final
Sweden (Edin) 🔨	0	1	0	1	0	1	0	0	3	0	6
Scotland (Mouat)	0	0	2	0	2	0	1	2	0	1	8

== Playoffs ==
Qualification games
4	Germany	3
5	Italy	8
3	Scotland	8
6	United States	4

Semifinals
1	Sweden	5
5	Italy	3
2	Canada	9
3	Scotland	4

Final
1	Sweden	6
2	Canada	5
Bronze medal game
5	Italy	7
3	Scotland	6

=== Qualification Games ===
Saturday, April 6, 10:00 am

Sheet B	1	2	3	4	5	6	7	8	9	10	Final
Scotland (Mouat) 🔨	2	0	0	0	3	0	0	0	3	X	8
United States (Shuster)	0	0	0	2	0	2	0	0	0	X	4

Player percentages
Scotland		United States	
Hammy McMillan Jr.	97%	John Landsteiner	81%
Bobby Lammie	85%	Colin Hufman	89%
Grant Hardie	81%	Chris Plys	85%
Bruce Mouat	93%	John Shuster	83%
Total	89%	Total	84%

Sheet D	1	2	3	4	5	6	7	8	9	10	Final
Germany (Muskatewitz) 🔨	1	0	0	0	0	0	1	1	0	X	3
Italy (Retornaz)	0	0	2	1	1	1	0	0	3	X	8

Player percentages
Germany		Italy	
Johannes Scheuerl	85%	Mattia Giovanella	94%
Felix Messenzehl	85%	Sebastiano Arman	96%
Benjamin Kapp	75%	Amos Mosaner	86%
Marc Muskatewitz	61%	Joël Retornaz	88%
Total	76%	Total	91%

=== Semifinals ===
Saturday, April 6, 4:00 pm

Sheet B	1	2	3	4	5	6	7	8	9	10	Final
Sweden (Edin) 🔨	0	0	2	0	0	0	3	0	0	X	5
Italy (Retornaz)	0	0	0	1	0	0	0	1	1	X	3

Player percentages
Sweden		Italy	
Christoffer Sundgren	98%	Mattia Giovanella	94%
Rasmus Wranå	93%	Sebastiano Arman	90%
Oskar Eriksson	94%	Amos Mosaner	97%
Niklas Edin	97%	Joël Retornaz	70%
Total	95%	Total	88%

Sheet D	1	2	3	4	5	6	7	8	9	10	Final
Canada (Gushue) 🔨	2	0	0	0	1	3	0	3	X	X	9
Scotland (Mouat)	0	2	0	1	0	0	1	0	X	X	4

Player percentages
Canada		Scotland	
Geoff Walker	84%	Hammy McMillan Jr.	92%
E. J. Harnden	84%	Bobby Lammie	88%
Mark Nichols	86%	Grant Hardie	88%
Brad Gushue	84%	Bruce Mouat	78%
Total	85%	Total	86%

=== Bronze medal game ===
Sunday, April 7, 10:00 am

Sheet C	1	2	3	4	5	6	7	8	9	10	11	Final
Italy (Retornaz)	0	1	0	1	0	0	1	0	0	3	1	7
Scotland (Mouat) 🔨	1	0	1	0	2	0	0	0	2	0	0	6

Player percentages
Italy		Scotland	
Mattia Giovanella	94%	Hammy McMillan Jr.	97%
Sebastiano Arman	81%	Bobby Lammie	83%
Amos Mosaner	84%	Grant Hardie	88%
Joël Retornaz	84%	Bruce Mouat	84%
Total	86%	Total	88%

=== Final ===
Sunday, April 7, 3:00 pm

Sheet C	1	2	3	4	5	6	7	8	9	10	Final
Sweden (Edin) 🔨	0	2	1	0	0	1	0	1	0	1	6
Canada (Gushue)	0	0	0	2	0	0	1	0	2	0	5

Player percentages
Sweden		Canada	
Christoffer Sundgren	98%	Geoff Walker	94%
Rasmus Wranå	95%	E. J. Harnden	75%
Oskar Eriksson	93%	Mark Nichols	89%
Niklas Edin	95%	Brad Gushue	89%
Total	95%	Total	87%

== Statistics ==
=== Player percentages ===
Final Round Robin Percentages

Key
All-Star Team

Leads	%
(Sweden) Christoffer Sundgren	93.1
(Italy) Mattia Giovanella	92.2
(Canada) Geoff Walker	92.1
(Scotland) Hammy McMillan Jr.	91.7
(United States) John Landsteiner	91.4
(Switzerland) Pablo Lachat-Couchepin	91.2
(Germany) Johannes Scheuerl	90.2
(United States) Matt Hamilton (Note: Played in five games)	89.6
(Netherlands) Tobias van den Hurk	89.1
(South Korea) Seong Ji-hoon	88.9
(Norway) Gaute Nepstad	87.0
(Japan) Asei Nakahara (Note: Includes five games throwing lead rocks and three games throwing second rocks; Played in eight games)	86.2
(Japan) Sota Tsuruga	85.2
(New Zealand) Hunter Walker	84.2
(Czech Republic) Lukáš Klípa	83.4

Seconds	%
(Sweden) Rasmus Wranå	86.4
(Canada) E. J. Harnden	85.6
(Switzerland) Sven Michel	85.5
(Germany) Felix Messenzehl	85.3
(Scotland) Bobby Lammie	84.7
(Japan) Haruto Ouchi	84.5
(Norway) Bendik Ramsfjell	83.5
(United States) Colin Hufman	83.3
(Italy) Sebastiano Arman	82.0
(Netherlands) Jaap van Dorp	81.1
(Czech Republic) Martin Jurík	78.2
(South Korea) Oh Seung-hoon	76.8
(New Zealand) Brett Sargon	72.7

Thirds	%
(Canada) Mark Nichols	91.0
(Italy) Amos Mosaner	88.1
(Switzerland) Yannick Schwaller (Skip)	87.7
(Sweden) Oskar Eriksson	86.5
(United States) Chris Plys	85.6
(Scotland) Grant Hardie	84.7
(South Korea) Jeong Yeong-seok	81.5
(Czech Republic) Marek Černovský	80.9
(Germany) Benjamin Kapp	79.5
(Norway) Martin Sesaker	79.4
(Japan) Shinya Abe (Skip)	77.1
(Netherlands) Laurens Hoekman	76.8
(New Zealand) Ben Smith	71.8

Skips	%
(Canada) Brad Gushue	88.4
(Scotland) Bruce Mouat	86.8
(Sweden) Niklas Edin	85.3
(Italy) Joël Retornaz	84.4
(Switzerland) Benoît Schwarz-van Berkel (Fourth)	84.3
(United States) John Shuster	81.3
(Germany) Marc Muskatewitz	80.9
(Norway) Magnus Ramsfjell	80.1
(Netherlands) Wouter Gösgens	78.8
(Japan) Tetsuro Shimizu (Fourth)	76.9
(Czech Republic) Lukáš Klíma	75.3
(South Korea) Park Jong-duk	71.2
(New Zealand) Anton Hood	68.6

=== Perfect games ===
Minimum 12 shots thrown

Player	Team	Position	Shots	Opponent
Bruce Mouat	Scotland	Skip	12	New Zealand
Yannick Schwaller	Switzerland	Skip	20	Netherlands
Christoffer Sundgren	Sweden	Lead	20	Scotland

== Awards ==
The awards and all-star team are as follows:

All-Star Team

- Fourth: Brad Gushue, Canada
- Third: Mark Nichols, Canada
- Second: Rasmus Wranå, Sweden
- Lead: Christoffer Sundgren, Sweden

Collie Campbell Memorial Award

- Chris Plys, United States

== Final standings ==
Place	Team
1st place, gold medalist(s)	Sweden
2nd place, silver medalist(s)	Canada
3rd place, bronze medalist(s)	Italy
4	Scotland
5	Germany
6	United States
7	Switzerland
8	Netherlands
9	Czech Republic
10	Norway
11	Japan
12	South Korea
13	New Zealand

== National playdowns ==
- (Canada) 2024 Montana's Brier
- (Germany) 2024 German Men's Curling Championship
- 2024 Japan Curling Championships
- (South Korea) 2023 Korean Curling Championships
- 2024 United States Men's Curling Championship
