= Alexander Magan =

Dutch curler

- Curler
- Born: 25 September 1993 (age 33)

Team
- Curling club: CC PWA Zoetermeer, Zoetermeer, NED

Curling career
- Member Association: Netherlands
- World Championship: 3 (2017, 2018, 2024)
- European Championship: 6 (2017, 2018, 2019, 2022, 2023, 2024)

Alexander Magan (born 25 September 1993) is a Dutch curler.

== Teams ==
=== Men's ===
Season	Skip	Third	Second	Lead	Alternate	Coach	Events
2016–17	Jaap van Dorp	Wouter Gösgens	Laurens Hoekman	Carlo Glasbergen	Alexander Magan	Shari Leibbrandt-Demmon	WCC 2017 (11th)
2017–18	Jaap van Dorp	Wouter Gösgens	Laurens Hoekman	Carlo Glasbergen	Alexander Magan	Shari Leibbrandt-Demmon	ECC 2017 (7th); WCC 2018 (10th)
2018–19	Wouter Gösgens (Fourth)	Jaap van Dorp (Skip)	Laurens Hoekman	Carlo Glasbergen	Alexander Magan	Shari Leibbrandt-Demmon	ECC 2018 (8th)
2018–19	Olaf Bolkenbaas	Alexander Magan	Tobias van den Hurk	Lars de Boom			
2019–20	Wouter Gösgens (Fourth)	Jaap van Dorp (Skip)	Laurens Hoekman	Carlo Glasbergen	Alexander Magan	Shari Leibbrandt	ECC 2019 (8th)
2022–23	Wouter Gösgens	Jaap van Dorp	Laurens Hoekman	Tobias van den Hurk	Alexander Magan	Shari Leibbrandt	ECC 2022 (11th); (gold) Division B
2023–24	Wouter Gösgens	Laurens Hoekman	Jaap van Dorp	Tobias van den Hurk	Alexander Magan	Shari Leibbrandt	ECC 2023 (7th); WCC 2024 (8th)
2024–25	Wouter Gösgens	Tobias van den Hurk	Laurens Hoekman	Alexander Magan	Simon Spits	Shari Leibbrandt	ECC 2024 (9th)
2025–26	Wouter Gösgens	Laurens Hoekman	Jaap van Dorp	Tobias van den Hurk	Alexander Magan	Shari Leibbrandt	

=== Mixed doubles ===
Season	Female	Male
2019–20	Vanessa Tonoli	Alexander Magan
