= Daniel Magnusson (curler) =

Swedish male curler

- Curler
- Born: 8 March 2000 (age 26); Karlstad, Sweden

Team
- Curling club: Karlstads CK, Karlstad

Curling career
- Member Association: Sweden
- World Championship: 5 (2019, 2021, 2022, 2023, 2024)
- European Championship: 6 (2018, 2019, 2021, 2022, 2023, 2024)
- Olympic: 1 (2022)
- Other appearances: World Junior Championships: 1 (2018)
Medal record
Men's curling
Representing Sweden
Olympic Games
Gold medal – first place	2022 Beijing	Team
World Championships
Gold medal – first place	2019 Lethbridge
Gold medal – first place	2021 Calgary
Gold medal – first place	2022 Las Vegas
Gold medal – first place	2024 Schaffhausen
European Championships
Gold medal – first place	2019 Helsingborg
Silver medal – second place	2018 Tallinn
Silver medal – second place	2021 Lillehammer
Silver medal – second place	2023 Aberdeen
Swedish Men's Championship
Gold medal – first place	2023 Karlstad
Silver medal – second place	2020 Jönköping
Silver medal – second place	2022 Härnösand
Bronze medal – third place	2018 Skelleftea
Bronze medal – third place	2019 Jönköping

Daniel Wilhelm Magnusson (born 8 March 2000) is a Swedish curler.

== Private life ==
Daniel Magnusson started curling in 2008, when he was 8 years old.

He resides in Karlstad. He attended Linnaeus University.

== Teams ==
=== Men's ===
Season	Skip	Third	Second	Lead	Alternate	Coach	Events
2015–16	Erik Johansson	Anton Regosa	Emil Ring	Daniel Magnusson	Sebastian Jones		SJCC 2016 (silver)
2016–17	Erik Johansson	Anton Regosa	Emil Ring	Daniel Magnusson	Sebastian Jones		SMCC 2017 (12th)
2017–18	Sebastian Jones	Anton Regosa	Johan Nygren	Daniel Magnusson		Greta Aurell	SMCC 2018 (bronze)
2017–18	Daniel Magnusson	Johan Nygren	Anton Regosa	Sebastian Jones	Filip Stener (WJCC)	Greta Aurell	SJCC 2018 (gold); WJCC 2018 (7th)
2018–19	Niklas Edin	Oskar Eriksson	Rasmus Wranå	Christoffer Sundgren	Daniel Magnusson	Fredrik Lindberg	ECC 2018 (silver); WCC 2019 (gold)
2018–19	Daniel Magnusson	Johan Nygren	Anton Regosa	Sebastian Jones	Ivar Veszelei	Greta Aurell	SMCC 2019 (bronze)
2019–20	Niklas Edin	Oskar Eriksson	Rasmus Wranå	Christoffer Sundgren	Daniel Magnusson	Fredrik Lindberg	ECC 2019 (gold)
2019–20	Daniel Magnusson	Robin Ahlberg	Anton Regosa	Sebastian Jones		Sebastian Kraupp	SMCC 2020 (silver)
2020–21	Niklas Edin	Oskar Eriksson	Rasmus Wranå	Christoffer Sundgren	Daniel Magnusson	Fredrik Lindberg	WCC 2021 (gold)
2020–21	Daniel Magnusson	Rasmus Israelsson	Robin Ahlberg	Anton Regosa			
2021–22	Niklas Edin	Oskar Eriksson	Rasmus Wranå	Christoffer Sundgren	Daniel Magnusson	Fredrik Lindberg	ECC 2021 (silver); WOG 2022 (gold); WCC 2022 (gold)
2021–22	Daniel Magnusson	Rasmus Israelsson	Robin Ahlberg	Anton Regosa	Arvid Norin		SMCC 2022 (silver)
2022–23	Niklas Edin	Oskar Eriksson	Rasmus Wranå	Christoffer Sundgren	Daniel Magnusson		ECC 2022 (4th); SMCC 2023 (gold); WCC 2023 (5th)
2023–24	Niklas Edin	Oskar Eriksson	Rasmus Wranå	Christoffer Sundgren	Daniel Magnusson		ECC 2023 (silver); WCC 2024 (gold)
2024–25	Niklas Edin	Oskar Eriksson	Rasmus Wranå	Christoffer Sundgren	Daniel Magnusson		ECC 2024 (5th)

=== Mixed doubles ===
Season	Male	Female	Events
2018–19	Daniel Magnusson	Tova Sundberg	SMDCC 2019 (5th)
