= Tobias van den Hurk =

Dutch curler

- Curler
- Born: 2000 or 2001 (age 25–26); Zoetermeer, Netherlands

Team
- Curling club: CC PWA Zoetermeer, Zoetermeer, NED

Curling career
- Member Association: Netherlands
- World Championship: 3 (2021, 2022, 2024)
- European Championship: 4 (2021, 2022, 2023, 2024)
- Other appearances: European Junior Challenge: 2 (2014, 2015)

Tobias van den Hurk is a Dutch curler.

== Personal life ==
As of 2018, he was a computer science engineering student at Delft University of Technology.

== Teams ==
Season	Skip	Third	Second	Lead	Alternate	Coach	Events
2013–14	Wouter Gösgens	Laurens Hoekman	Stefano Miog	Tobias van den Hurk	Joey Bruinsma	Shari Leibbrandt-Demmon	EJCC 2014 (silver)
2014–15	Wouter Gösgens	Laurens Hoekman	Stefano Miog	Tobias van den Hurk	Joey Bruinsma	Shari Leibbrandt-Demmon	EJCC 2015 (5th)
2015–16	Stefano Miog	Tobias van den Hurk	Jop Kuijpers	Olaf Bolkenbaas	Bart Klomp	Ezra Wiebe	WJBCC 2016 (18th)
2016–17	Tobias van den Hurk (fourth)	Jop Kuijpers	Bart Klomp	Olaf Bolkenbaas (skip)	Simon Spits	Ezra Wiebe	WJBCC 2017 (21st)
2016–17	Tobias van den Hurk (fourth)	Jop Kuijpers (skip)	Simon Spits	Bart Klomp	Joey Bruinsma		
2017–18	Tobias van den Hurk (fourth)	Jop Kuijpers	Bart Klomp	Olaf Bolkenbaas (skip)	Simon Spits	Joey Bruinsma	WJBCC 2018 (15th)
2017–18	Tobias van den Hurk (fourth)	Jop Kuijpers (skip)	Simon Spits	Bart Klomp	Joey Bruinsma		
2018–19	Tobias van den Hurk (fourth)	Jop Kuijpers (skip)	Simon Spits	Bart Klomp	Maarten Spits (WJBCC); Joey Bruinsma	Joey Bruinsma (WJBCC)	WJBCC 2019 (Jan) (17th)
2018–19	Olaf Bolkenbaas	Alexander Magan	Tobias van den Hurk	Lars de Boom			
2019–20	Tobias van den Hurk (fourth)	Bart Klomp (skip)	Simon Spits	Maarten Spits		Joey Bruinsma	WJBCC 2019 (Dec) (13th)
2020–21	Wouter Gösgens (fourth)	Jaap van Dorp (skip)	Laurens Hoekman	Carlo Glasbergen	Tobias van den Hurk		WCC 2021 (12th)
2021–22	Wouter Gösgens	Jaap van Dorp	Laurens Hoekman	Carlo Glasbergen	Tobias van den Hurk	Shari Leibbrandt	ECC 2021 (9th)
2022–23	Wouter Gösgens	Jaap van Dorp	Laurens Hoekman	Tobias van den Hurk	Alexander Magan	Shari Leibbrandt	ECC 2022 (11th); (gold) Division B
2023–24	Wouter Gösgens	Jaap van Dorp	Laurens Hoekman	Tobias van den Hurk	Alexander Magan	Shari Leibbrandt	ECC 2023 (7th); WCC 2024 (8th)
2024–25	Wouter Gösgens	Tobias van den Hurk	Laurens Hoekman	Alexander Magan	Simon Spits	Shari Leibbrandt	ECC 2024 (9th)
2025–26	Wouter Gösgens	Laurens Hoekman	Jaap van Dorp	Tobias van den Hurk	Alexander Magan	Shari Leibbrandt	
