= 2024 European Curling Championships =

Competition in Finland, Sweden and Scotland

2024 Le Gruyère AOP European Curling Championships
- Host city: Lohja, Finland (A divisions); Östersund, Sweden (B divisions); Dumfries, Scotland (C divisions)
- Arena: Kisakallio Sports Institute (A divisions); Östersund Curling Club (B divisions); Dumfries Ice Bowl (C divisions)
- Dates: November 16–23 (A & B divisions); April 28 – May 4 (C division)
- Men's winner: Germany
- Curling club: CC Füssen, Füssen
- Skip: Marc Muskatewitz
- Third: Benjamin Kapp
- Second: Felix Messenzehl
- Lead: Johannes Scheuerl
- Alternate: Mario Trevisiol
- Coach: Ryan Sherrard
- Finalist: Scotland (Mouat)
- Women's winner: Switzerland
- Curling club: CC Aarau, Aarau
- Skip: Silvana Tirinzoni
- Fourth: Alina Pätz
- Second: Carole Howald
- Lead: Selina Witschonke
- Alternate: Stefanie Berset
- Coach: Pierre Charette
- Finalist: Sweden (Hasselborg)

The 2024 Le Gruyère AOP European Curling Championships were held from November 16 to 23, with the A division being held at the Kisakallio Sports Institute in Lohja, Finland, and the B division being held at the Östersund Curling Club in Östersund, Sweden. The C division competition was held from April 28 to May 4 at the Dumfries Ice Bowl in Dumfries, Scotland.

The tournaments also served as European qualifiers for the 2025 World Curling Championships. The top eight men's and women's teams qualified for the 2025 World Men's Curling Championship and the 2025 World Women's Curling Championship respectively.

== Medallists ==
A Division	Gold	Silver	Bronze
Men	Germany; Marc Muskatewitz; Benjamin Kapp; Felix Messenzehl; Johannes Scheuerl; Mario Trevisiol	Scotland; Bruce Mouat; Grant Hardie; Bobby Lammie; Hammy McMillan Jr. Kyle Waddell	Norway; Magnus Ramsfjell; Martin Sesaker; Bendik Ramsfjell; Gaute Nepstad; Willhelm Næss
Women	Switzerland; Alina Pätz (Fourth); Silvana Tirinzoni (Skip); Carole Howald; Selina Witschonke; Stefanie Berset	Sweden; Anna Hasselborg; Sara McManus; Agnes Knochenhauer; Sofia Mabergs; Johanna Heldin	Scotland; Rebecca Morrison (Fourth); Jennifer Dodds; Sophie Sinclair; Sophie Jackson (Skip); Fay Henderson

B Division	Gold	Silver	Bronze
Men	Denmark; Jonathan Vilandt (Fourth); Jacob Schmidt (Skip); Alexander Qvist; Mads Nørgaard; Kasper Jurlander Bøge	Poland; Konrad Stych; Krzysztof Domin; Marcin Ciemiński; Bartosz Łobaza; Maksym Grzelka	Spain; Sergio Vez; Mikel Unanue; Eduardo de Paz; Nicholas Shaw
Women	Czech Republic; Zuzana Paulová; Alžběta Zelingrová; Michaela Baudyšová; Aneta Müllerová; Karolína Špundová	Germany; Kim Sutor (Fourth); Sara Messenzehl (Skip); Zoé Antes; Joy Sutor; Pia-Lisa Schöll	Poland; Aneta Lipińska; Ewa Nogły; Marta Leszczyńska; Magdalena Kołodziej; Julia Dyderska

C Division	Gold	Silver	Bronze
Men	Bulgaria; Reto Seiler; Bojidar Momerin; Tihomir Todorov; Stanimir Petrov; Nikolay Runtov	Israel; Alex Pokras; Dmitry Abanin; Lawrence Sidney; Jeffrey Yaakov Lutz	Slovenia; Gaber Bor Zelinka; Jakob Omerzel; Simon Langus; Javor Brin Zelinka; Noel Gregori
Women	Netherlands; Vanessa Tonoli (Fourth); Lisenka Bomas (Skip); Anandi Bomas; Linde Nas; Marit van Valkenhoef	Wales; Laura Beever; Judith Glazier; Emily Simpson; Anna Carruthers	Ukraine; Yaroslava Kalinichenko (Fourth); Diana Moskalenko (Skip); Oleksandra Kononenko; Anastasiia Mosol

== Men ==
=== A division ===
==== Qualification ====
The following nations qualified to participate in the 2024 European Curling Championship:

Event	Vacancies	Qualified
2023 European Curling Championships A Division	8	Scotland; Sweden; Switzerland; Italy; Norway; Germany; Netherlands; Czech Republic
2023 European Curling Championships B Division	2	England; Austria
TOTAL	10	

==== Teams ====
The teams are listed as follows:

Austria	Czech Republic	England	Germany	Italy
Skip: Mathias Genner; Third: Jonas Backofen; Second: Martin Reichel; Lead: Florian Mavec; Alternate: Johann Karg	Skip: Lukáš Klíma; Third: Marek Černovský; Second: Martin Jurík; Lead: Lukáš Klípa; Alternate: Radek Boháč	Skip: Rob Retchless; Third: Jotham Sugden; Second: Scott Gibson; Lead: Jonathan Havercroft; Alternate: Colin Mouat	Skip: Marc Muskatewitz; Third: Benjamin Kapp; Second: Felix Messenzehl; Lead: Johannes Scheuerl; Alternate: Mario Trevisiol	Skip: Joël Retornaz; Third: Amos Mosaner; Second: Sebastiano Arman; Lead: Mattia Giovanella; Alternate: Alberto Zisa
Netherlands	Norway	Scotland	Sweden	Switzerland
Skip: Wouter Gösgens; Third: Tobias van den Hurk; Second: Laurens Hoekman; Lead: Alexander Magan; Alternate: Simon Spits	Skip: Magnus Ramsfjell; Third: Martin Sesaker; Second: Bendik Ramsfjell; Lead: Gaute Nepstad; Alternate: Willhelm Næss	Skip: Bruce Mouat; Third: Grant Hardie; Second: Bobby Lammie; Lead: Hammy McMillan Jr. Alternate: Kyle Waddell	Skip: Niklas Edin; Third: Oskar Eriksson; Second: Rasmus Wranå; Lead: Christoffer Sundgren; Alternate: Daniel Magnusson	Fourth: Benoît Schwarz-van Berkel; Skip: Yannick Schwaller; Second: Sven Michel; Lead: Pablo Lachat-Couchepin; Alternate: Tom Winkelhausen

==== Round robin standings ====
Final Round Robin Standings

Key
Teams to Playoffs and Qualified for the 2025 World Men's Curling Championship
Teams Qualified for the 2025 World Men's Curling Championship
Teams Relegated to 2025 B Division

Country	Skip	W	L	W–L	PF	PA	EW	EL	BE	SE	S%	DSC
Scotland	Bruce Mouat	8	1	–	79	44	44	30	3	13	88.0%	31.21
Norway	Magnus Ramsfjell	6	3	3–1	69	49	40	34	3	7	85.7%	17.03
Germany	Marc Muskatewitz	6	3	2–2; 2–0	66	51	33	36	5	4	85.2%	17.08
Switzerland	Yannick Schwaller	6	3	2–2; 1–1	63	50	36	34	4	11	85.8%	14.73
Sweden	Niklas Edin	6	3	2–2; 0–2	66	55	40	37	2	12	82.6%	36.65
Italy	Joël Retornaz	6	3	1–3	65	56	42	37	5	11	85.3%	21.70
Austria	Mathias Genner	3	6	–	41	63	30	36	6	4	73.8%	70.96
Czech Republic	Lukáš Klíma	2	7	1–0	61	71	38	38	5	7	76.6%	41.50
Netherlands	Wouter Gösgens	2	7	0–1	58	75	38	42	2	8	77.4%	33.04
England	Rob Retchless	0	9	–	26	80	21	38	5	2	71.3%	44.57

Round Robin Summary Table
Pos.	Country	Austria	Czech Republic	England	Germany	Italy	Netherlands	Norway	Scotland	Sweden	Switzerland	Record
7	Austria	—	9–8	7–2	2–10	4–6	8–6	2–7	2–10	6–7	1–7	3–6
8	Czech Republic	8–9	—	12–5	6–8	7–8	10–7	3–5	2–10	6–9	7–10	2–7
10	England	2–7	5–12	—	2–10	3–8	5–7	4–9	1–8	3–8	1–11	0–9
3	Germany	10–2	8–6	10–2	—	5–8	9–5	4–8	5–12	6–5	9–3	6–3
6	Italy	6–4	8–7	8–3	8–5	—	11–6	7–10	10–7	3–7	4–7	6–3
9	Netherlands	6–8	7–10	7–5	5–9	6–11	—	9–7	6–8	6–9	6–8	2–7
2	Norway	7–2	5–3	9–4	8–4	10–7	7–9	—	5–6	8–9	10–5	6–3
1	Scotland	10–2	10–2	8–1	12–5	7–10	8–6	6–5	—	11–7	7–6	8–1
5	Sweden	7–6	9–6	8–3	5–6	7–3	9–6	9–8	7–11	—	5–6	6–3
4	Switzerland	7–1	10–7	11–1	3–9	7–4	8–6	5–10	6–7	6–5	—	6–3

==== Round robin results ====
All draw times are listed in Eastern European Summer Time (UTC+03:00).

===== Draw 1 =====
Saturday, November 16, 2:30 pm

Sheet A	1	2	3	4	5	6	7	8	9	10	Final
England (Retchless)	0	1	0	0	1	0	0	1	X	X	3
Italy (Retornaz) 🔨	2	0	1	2	0	1	2	0	X	X	8

Sheet B	1	2	3	4	5	6	7	8	9	10	Final
Austria (Genner)	0	0	0	0	0	1	0	X	X	X	1
Switzerland (Schwaller) 🔨	0	2	1	1	0	0	3	X	X	X	7

Sheet C	1	2	3	4	5	6	7	8	9	10	Final
Germany (Muskatewitz)	0	1	0	1	0	0	2	0	0	0	4
Norway (Ramsfjell) 🔨	1	0	0	0	2	0	0	1	2	2	8

Sheet D	1	2	3	4	5	6	7	8	9	10	Final
Sweden (Edin) 🔨	0	0	2	0	3	1	0	0	3	X	9
Czech Republic (Klíma)	1	1	0	1	0	0	0	3	0	X	6

Sheet E	1	2	3	4	5	6	7	8	9	10	Final
Netherlands (Gösgens)	1	0	1	0	0	0	3	0	1	X	6
Scotland (Mouat) 🔨	0	2	0	2	1	1	0	2	0	X	8

===== Draw 2 =====
Sunday, November 17, 9:00 am

Sheet A	1	2	3	4	5	6	7	8	9	10	Final
Switzerland (Schwaller) 🔨	1	2	1	1	0	1	0	0	0	0	6
Sweden (Edin)	0	0	0	0	1	0	2	1	0	1	5

Sheet B	1	2	3	4	5	6	7	8	9	10	Final
Italy (Retornaz) 🔨	1	1	0	2	0	1	0	2	0	1	8
Czech Republic (Klíma)	0	0	1	0	2	0	1	0	3	0	7

Sheet C	1	2	3	4	5	6	7	8	9	10	Final
Netherlands (Gösgens) 🔨	1	1	0	1	0	0	2	2	0	X	7
England (Retchless)	0	0	1	0	3	0	0	0	1	X	5

Sheet D	1	2	3	4	5	6	7	8	9	10	Final
Scotland (Mouat)	0	0	1	0	2	0	0	2	0	1	6
Norway (Ramsfjell) 🔨	1	1	0	1	0	1	0	0	1	0	5

Sheet E	1	2	3	4	5	6	7	8	9	10	Final
Austria (Genner)	0	1	0	0	1	0	X	X	X	X	2
Germany (Muskatewitz) 🔨	4	0	3	2	0	1	X	X	X	X	10

===== Draw 3 =====
Sunday, November 17, 7:00 pm

Sheet A	1	2	3	4	5	6	7	8	9	10	Final
Norway (Ramsfjell) 🔨	2	0	2	0	3	0	X	X	X	X	7
Austria (Genner)	0	0	0	1	0	1	X	X	X	X	2

Sheet B	1	2	3	4	5	6	7	8	9	10	Final
England (Retchless)	0	1	0	0	0	0	X	X	X	X	1
Scotland (Mouat) 🔨	2	0	1	3	0	2	X	X	X	X	8

Sheet C	1	2	3	4	5	6	7	8	9	10	Final
Italy (Retornaz)	0	0	0	0	0	1	0	2	0	X	3
Sweden (Edin) 🔨	2	0	0	0	1	0	2	0	2	X	7

Sheet D	1	2	3	4	5	6	7	8	9	10	Final
Germany (Muskatewitz) 🔨	5	0	1	0	0	1	0	2	0	X	9
Netherlands (Gösgens)	0	2	0	1	0	0	1	0	1	X	5

Sheet E	1	2	3	4	5	6	7	8	9	10	Final
Switzerland (Schwaller)	0	3	0	1	0	3	0	3	0	X	10
Czech Republic (Klíma) 🔨	2	0	1	0	2	0	1	0	1	X	7

===== Draw 4 =====
Monday, November 18, 12:00 pm

Sheet A	1	2	3	4	5	6	7	8	9	10	Final
Czech Republic (Klíma) 🔨	3	0	0	3	0	0	2	0	1	1	10
Netherlands (Gösgens)	0	1	1	0	3	1	0	1	0	0	7

Sheet B	1	2	3	4	5	6	7	8	9	10	11	Final
Germany (Muskatewitz) 🔨	2	0	1	0	0	1	0	0	1	0	1	6
Sweden (Edin)	0	1	0	1	1	0	0	1	0	1	0	5

Sheet C	1	2	3	4	5	6	7	8	9	10	11	Final
Scotland (Mouat) 🔨	1	0	2	0	0	1	0	1	0	1	1	7
Switzerland (Schwaller)	0	1	0	1	0	0	2	0	2	0	0	6

Sheet D	1	2	3	4	5	6	7	8	9	10	Final
Norway (Ramsfjell)	0	0	2	0	0	4	1	0	2	X	9
England (Retchless) 🔨	1	1	0	0	1	0	0	1	0	X	4

Sheet E	1	2	3	4	5	6	7	8	9	10	Final
Italy (Retornaz) 🔨	0	1	2	0	1	0	0	0	2	0	6
Austria (Genner)	1	0	0	1	0	0	1	0	0	1	4

===== Draw 5 =====
Monday, November 18, 8:00 pm

Sheet A	1	2	3	4	5	6	7	8	9	10	Final
Germany (Muskatewitz) 🔨	0	0	5	1	0	3	X	X	X	X	9
Switzerland (Schwaller)	2	0	0	0	1	0	X	X	X	X	3

Sheet B	1	2	3	4	5	6	7	8	9	10	Final
Netherlands (Gösgens) 🔨	0	1	4	0	0	1	0	0	0	X	6
Italy (Retornaz)	1	0	0	3	1	0	2	2	2	X	11

Sheet C	1	2	3	4	5	6	7	8	9	10	Final
England (Retchless) 🔨	0	1	0	0	2	0	2	0	0	X	5
Czech Republic (Klíma)	1	0	0	5	0	2	0	1	3	X	12

Sheet D	1	2	3	4	5	6	7	8	9	10	Final
Austria (Genner) 🔨	0	0	1	1	0	0	X	X	X	X	2
Scotland (Mouat)	4	3	0	0	2	1	X	X	X	X	10

Sheet E	1	2	3	4	5	6	7	8	9	10	Final
Sweden (Edin)	1	0	0	2	0	2	0	3	0	1	9
Norway (Ramsfjell) 🔨	0	2	0	0	2	0	3	0	1	0	8

===== Draw 6 =====
Tuesday, November 19, 2:00 pm

Sheet A	1	2	3	4	5	6	7	8	9	10	Final
Netherlands (Gösgens)	0	0	0	4	0	2	0	2	1	0	9
Norway (Ramsfjell) 🔨	2	1	0	0	2	0	1	0	0	1	7

Sheet B	1	2	3	4	5	6	7	8	9	10	Final
Switzerland (Schwaller) 🔨	0	2	4	4	1	0	X	X	X	X	11
England (Retchless)	0	0	0	0	0	1	X	X	X	X	1

Sheet C	1	2	3	4	5	6	7	8	9	10	11	Final
Sweden (Edin) 🔨	2	0	1	0	0	2	0	0	1	0	1	7
Austria (Genner)	0	2	0	1	1	0	0	1	0	1	0	6

Sheet D	1	2	3	4	5	6	7	8	9	10	Final
Czech Republic (Klíma) 🔨	1	0	1	0	1	0	1	2	0	X	6
Germany (Muskatewitz)	0	1	0	2	0	2	0	0	3	X	8

Sheet E	1	2	3	4	5	6	7	8	9	10	11	Final
Scotland (Mouat) 🔨	1	0	1	0	0	2	0	2	0	1	0	7
Italy (Retornaz)	0	2	0	1	0	0	2	0	2	0	3	10

===== Draw 7 =====
Wednesday, November 20, 9:00 am

Sheet A	1	2	3	4	5	6	7	8	9	10	Final
Austria (Genner)	0	3	0	1	0	1	0	3	0	1	9
Czech Republic (Klíma) 🔨	2	0	1	0	1	0	2	0	2	0	8

Sheet B	1	2	3	4	5	6	7	8	9	10	Final
Scotland (Mouat) 🔨	2	1	1	0	2	0	2	0	4	X	12
Germany (Muskatewitz)	0	0	0	1	0	3	0	1	0	X	5

Sheet C	1	2	3	4	5	6	7	8	9	10	11	Final
Norway (Ramsfjell) 🔨	2	0	1	0	2	0	2	0	0	0	3	10
Italy (Retornaz)	0	1	0	2	0	2	0	1	0	1	0	7

Sheet D	1	2	3	4	5	6	7	8	9	10	Final
Netherlands (Gösgens)	0	2	0	1	0	1	0	0	2	X	6
Switzerland (Schwaller) 🔨	2	0	2	0	2	0	0	2	0	X	8

Sheet E	1	2	3	4	5	6	7	8	9	10	Final
England (Retchless) 🔨	0	1	0	0	0	2	X	X	X	X	3
Sweden (Edin)	3	0	2	1	2	0	X	X	X	X	8

===== Draw 8 =====
Wednesday, November 20, 7:00 pm

Sheet A	1	2	3	4	5	6	7	8	9	10	Final
Italy (Retornaz)	0	1	0	2	0	2	0	1	0	2	8
Germany (Muskatewitz) 🔨	2	0	1	0	0	0	1	0	1	0	5

Sheet B	1	2	3	4	5	6	7	8	9	10	Final
Sweden (Edin)	2	0	1	0	1	2	0	0	3	X	9
Netherlands (Gösgens) 🔨	0	1	0	2	0	0	2	1	0	X	6

Sheet C	1	2	3	4	5	6	7	8	9	10	Final
Czech Republic (Klíma)	0	1	0	1	0	0	X	X	X	X	2
Scotland (Mouat) 🔨	1	0	3	0	3	3	X	X	X	X	10

Sheet D	1	2	3	4	5	6	7	8	9	10	Final
England (Retchless)	0	0	1	0	1	0	0	0	0	X	2
Austria (Genner) 🔨	1	0	0	3	0	0	0	2	1	X	7

Sheet E	1	2	3	4	5	6	7	8	9	10	Final
Norway (Ramsfjell) 🔨	2	0	3	0	1	0	1	0	1	2	10
Switzerland (Schwaller)	0	1	0	1	0	1	0	2	0	0	5

===== Draw 9 =====
Thursday, November 21, 2:00 pm

Sheet A	1	2	3	4	5	6	7	8	9	10	Final
Sweden (Edin)	0	0	2	0	0	2	1	0	2	0	7
Scotland (Mouat) 🔨	2	2	0	1	2	0	0	1	0	3	11

Sheet B	1	2	3	4	5	6	7	8	9	10	Final
Czech Republic (Klíma)	1	0	0	0	1	0	0	1	0	0	3
Norway (Ramsfjell) 🔨	0	2	0	0	0	1	0	0	0	2	5

Sheet C	1	2	3	4	5	6	7	8	9	10	Final
Austria (Genner)	0	2	0	2	0	2	0	1	0	1	8
Netherlands (Gösgens) 🔨	2	0	1	0	1	0	1	0	1	0	6

Sheet D	1	2	3	4	5	6	7	8	9	10	Final
Switzerland (Schwaller)	0	0	3	0	0	1	0	1	1	1	7
Italy (Retornaz) 🔨	1	1	0	0	1	0	1	0	0	0	4

Sheet E	1	2	3	4	5	6	7	8	9	10	Final
Germany (Muskatewitz) 🔨	3	1	0	0	0	0	0	6	X	X	10
England (Retchless)	0	0	0	0	1	1	0	0	X	X	2

==== Playoffs ====
Semifinals
1	Scotland	10
4	Switzerland	8
2	Norway	2
3	Germany	8

Gold medal game
1	Scotland	7
3	Germany	9
Bronze medal game
4	Switzerland	4
2	Norway	7

===== Semifinals =====
Friday, November 22, 9:00 am

Sheet B	1	2	3	4	5	6	7	8	9	10	Final
Norway (Ramsfjell) 🔨	1	0	0	1	0	0	0	0	X	X	2
Germany (Muskatewitz)	0	2	4	0	1	0	0	1	X	X	8

Player percentages
Norway		Germany	
Gaute Nepstad	97%	Johannes Scheuerl	100%
Bendik Ramsfjell	84%	Felix Messenzehl	69%
Martin Sesaker	81%	Benjamin Kapp	91%
Magnus Ramsfjell	70%	Marc Muskatewitz	94%
Total	83%	Total	88%

Sheet D	1	2	3	4	5	6	7	8	9	10	11	Final
Scotland (Mouat) 🔨	2	0	1	0	1	0	2	0	2	0	2	10
Switzerland (Schwaller)	0	1	0	1	0	2	0	1	0	3	0	8

Player percentages
Scotland		Switzerland	
Hammy McMillan Jr.	93%	Pablo Lachat-Couchepin	93%
Bobby Lammie	92%	Sven Michel	98%
Grant Hardie	86%	Yannick Schwaller	84%
Bruce Mouat	83%	Benoît Schwarz-van Berkel	80%
Total	88%	Total	89%

===== Bronze medal game =====
Friday, November 22, 7:00 pm

Sheet C	1	2	3	4	5	6	7	8	9	10	Final
Switzerland (Schwaller)	1	0	0	0	1	0	1	0	1	0	4
Norway (Ramsfjell) 🔨	0	0	1	3	0	1	0	1	0	1	7

Player percentages
Switzerland		Norway	
Pablo Lachat-Couchepin	93%	Gaute Nepstad	90%
Sven Michel	96%	Bendik Ramsfjell	86%
Yannick Schwaller	91%	Martin Sesaker	81%
Benoît Schwarz-van Berkel	83%	Magnus Ramsfjell	91%
Total	91%	Total	87%

===== Gold medal game =====
Saturday, November 23, 3:00 pm

Sheet C	1	2	3	4	5	6	7	8	9	10	Final
Scotland (Mouat) 🔨	2	0	0	2	0	2	0	0	1	0	7
Germany (Muskatewitz)	0	3	1	0	1	0	2	1	0	1	9

Player percentages
Scotland		Germany	
Hammy McMillan Jr.	94%	Johannes Scheuerl	89%
Bobby Lammie	80%	Felix Messenzehl	85%
Grant Hardie	83%	Benjamin Kapp	90%
Bruce Mouat	71%	Marc Muskatewitz	88%
Total	82%	Total	88%

==== Player percentages ====
Round robin only

Leads	%
(Scotland) Hammy McMillan Jr.	94.1
(Italy) Mattia Giovanella	92.0
(Sweden) Christoffer Sundgren	90.9
(Germany) Johannes Scheuerl	90.4
(Norway) Gaute Nepstad	88.2

Seconds	%
(Italy) Sebastiano Arman	88.9
(Scotland) Bobby Lammie	86.5
(Switzerland) Sven Michel	86.1
(Norway) Bendik Ramsfjell	86.0
(Sweden) Rasmus Wranå	84.7

Thirds	%
(Germany) Benjamin Kapp	86.1
(Switzerland) Yannick Schwaller (Skip)	86.1
(Norway) Martin Sesaker	86.0
(Scotland) Grant Hardie	85.1
(Italy) Amos Mosaner	81.8

Skips	%
(Scotland) Bruce Mouat	85.8
(Switzerland) Benoît Schwarz-van Berkel (Fourth)	83.5
(Germany) Marc Muskatewitz	82.4
(Norway) Magnus Ramsfjell	82.4
(Italy) Joël Retornaz	78.2

==== Final standings ====
Key
Teams Advance to the 2025 World Men's Curling Championship
Teams Relegated to 2025 B Division

Place	Team
1st place, gold medalist(s)	Germany
2nd place, silver medalist(s)	Scotland
3rd place, bronze medalist(s)	Norway
4	Switzerland
5	Sweden
6	Italy
7	Austria
8	Czech Republic
9	Netherlands
10	England

=== B division ===
==== Teams ====
The teams are listed as follows:

Belgium	Bulgaria	Denmark	Estonia
Fourth: Jeroen Spruyt; Skip: Timothy Verreycken; Second: Tuur Vermeiren; Lead: Daan Yskout; Alternate: Tom Goethals	Skip: Reto Seiler; Third: Stoil Georgiev; Second: Tihomir Todorov; Lead: Stanimir Petrov; Alternate: Nikolay Muntov	Fourth: Jonathan Vilandt; Skip: Jacob Schmidt; Second: Alexander Qvist; Lead: Mads Nørgaard; Alternate: Kasper Jurlander Bøge	Fourth: Mihhail Vlassov; Skip: Eduard Veltsman; Second: Janis Kiziridi; Lead: Igor Dzendzeljuk; Alternate: Konstantin Dotsenko
Finland	France	Hungary	Ireland
Skip: Matias Hänninen; Third: Leo Ouni; Second: Valtteri Kinnunen; Lead: Ville Forsström; Alternate: Jami Heikkilä	Fourth: Quentin Morard; Skip: Eddy Mercier; Second: Yannick Valassori; Lead: Killian Gaudin; Alternate: Aurelien Fasano	Skip: Gergely Szabó; Third: Tamás Lendvay; Second: Nándor Miklós; Lead: Balázs Fóti	Skip: John Wilson; Third: Kyle Paradis; Second: James Russell; Lead: Craig Whyte
Israel	Latvia	Poland	Slovakia
Skip: Alex Pokras; Third: Nathan Pink; Second: Lawrence Sidney; Lead: Aaron Horowitz	Skip: Kristaps Zass; Third: Eduards Seļiverstovs; Second: Toms Sondors; Lead: Deniss Smirnovs; Alternate: Krišjānis Java	Skip: Konrad Stych; Third: Krzysztof Domin; Second: Marcin Ciemiński; Lead: Bartosz Łobaza; Alternate: Maksym Grzelka	Skip: Jakub Jurkovič; Third: Ján Horáček; Second: Karol Vidlár; Lead: Róbert Masaryk; Alternate: Ladislav Derzsi
Spain	Turkey	Ukraine	Wales
Skip: Sergio Vez; Third: Mikel Unanue; Second: Eduardo de Paz; Lead: Nicholas Shaw	Skip: Uğurcan Karagöz; Third: Muhammet Haydar Demirel; Second: Faruk Kavaz; Lead: Serkan Karagöz; Alternate: Mahsun Celebi	Skip: Eduard Nikolov; Third: Yarslov Shchur; Second: Artem Shuak; Lead: Vladyslay Koval; Alternate: Artem Haysnets	Skip: James Pougher; Third: Rhys Phillips; Second: Garry Combs; Lead: Richard Pougher

==== Round robin standings ====
Final Round Robin Standings

Key
Teams to Playoffs
Teams to Relegation Round

Group A	Skip	W	L	W–L	DSC
Spain	Sergio Vez	7	0	–	30.55
Turkey	Uğurcan Karagöz	6	1	–	44.32
Belgium	Timothy Verreycken	5	2	–	58.44
Ukraine	Eduard Nikolov	4	3	–	52.06
Hungary	Gergely Szabó	3	4	–	46.63
Slovakia	Jakub Jurkovič	1	6	1–1	28.57
Latvia	Kristaps Zass	1	6	1–1	47.49
Israel	Alex Pokras	1	6	1–1	69.64

Group B	Skip	W	L	W–L	DSC
Ireland	John Wilson	6	1	1–0	41.99
Denmark	Jacob Schmidt	6	1	0–1	45.95
Poland	Konrad Stych	5	2	1–0	34.66
France	Eddy Mercier	5	2	0–1	56.13
Finland	Matias Hänninen	3	4	–	30.41
Estonia	Eduard Veltsman	2	5	–	85.11
Wales	James Pougher	1	6	–	33.36
Bulgaria	Reto Seiler	0	7	–	111.50

Group A Round Robin Summary Table
Pos.	Country	Belgium	Hungary	Israel	Latvia	Slovakia	Spain	Turkey	Ukraine	Record
3	Belgium	—	8–7	13–3	10–5	8–2	6–7	2–9	6–5	5–2
5	Hungary	7–8	—	7–6	7–6	7–5	3–11	7–8	3–9	3–4
8	Israel	3–13	6–7	—	8–7	3–9	2–7	3–14	6–8	1–6
7	Latvia	5–10	6–7	7–8	—	11–8	2–7	1–7	9–10	1–6
6	Slovakia	2–8	5–7	9–3	8–11	—	2–10	5–8	2–13	1–6
1	Spain	7–6	11–3	7–2	7–2	10–2	—	6–4	8–6	7–0
2	Turkey	9–2	8–7	14–3	7–1	8–5	4–6	—	7–6	6–1
4	Ukraine	5–6	9–3	8–6	10–9	13–2	6–8	6–7	—	4–3

Group B Round Robin Summary Table
Pos.	Country	Bulgaria	Denmark	Estonia	Finland	France		Poland	Wales	Record
8	Bulgaria	—	2–11	4–8	5–10	3–8	4–9	3–10	3–16	0–7
2	Denmark	11–2	—	6–4	9–7	5–4	6–8	8–5	11–2	6–1
6	Estonia	8–4	4–6	—	4–6	8–14	6–7	4–10	10–8	2–5
5	Finland	10–5	7–9	6–4	—	5–9	6–7	1–11	10–5	3–4
4	France	8–3	4–5	14–8	9–5	—	6–4	2–10	8–1	5–2
1	Ireland	9–4	8–6	7–6	7–6	4–6	—	8–4	8–5	6–1
3	Poland	10–3	5–8	10–4	11–1	10–2	4–8	—	11–4	5–2
7	Wales	13–6	2–11	8–10	5–10	1–8	5–8	4–11	—	1–6

==== Relegation round ====
Relegation 1
A7	Latvia	3
B7	Wales	8
A8	Israel	9
B8	Bulgaria	7

Relegation 2
A7	Latvia	7
A8	Israel	9

Remain in B Division
Wales
Israel
Relegated to C Division
Latvia
Bulgaria

===== Relegation 1 =====
Friday, November 22, 6:00 pm

Sheet D	1	2	3	4	5	6	7	8	9	10	Final
Latvia (Zass)	0	0	1	0	1	0	0	1	0	0	3
Wales (Pougher) 🔨	1	1	0	2	0	0	0	0	1	3	8

Sheet E	1	2	3	4	5	6	7	8	9	10	Final
Israel (Pokras)	0	0	2	0	2	0	2	0	1	2	9
Bulgaria (Seiler) 🔨	1	1	0	1	0	1	0	3	0	0	7

===== Relegation 2 =====
Saturday, November 23, 9:00 am

Sheet F	1	2	3	4	5	6	7	8	9	10	Final
Latvia (Zass) 🔨	3	0	1	0	1	0	1	0	1	X	7
Israel (Pokras)	0	3	0	1	0	1	0	4	0	X	9

==== Playoffs ====
Qualification games
A3	Belgium	2
B2	Denmark	4
A2	Turkey	4
B3	Poland	5

Semifinals
A1	Spain	2
B2	Denmark	10
B1	Ireland	3
B3	Poland	7

Gold medal game
B2	Denmark	5
B3	Poland	2
Bronze medal game
A1	Spain	4
B1	Ireland	3

===== Qualification games =====
Friday, November 22, 6:00 pm

Sheet B	1	2	3	4	5	6	7	8	9	10	Final
Belgium (Verreycken)	0	0	0	0	0	1	0	1	0	0	2
Denmark (Schmidt) 🔨	0	0	0	0	0	0	1	0	0	3	4

Sheet C	1	2	3	4	5	6	7	8	9	10	Final
Turkey (Karagöz) 🔨	1	0	0	0	0	1	2	0	0	0	4
Poland (Stych)	0	0	1	1	1	0	0	0	0	2	5

===== Semifinals =====
Saturday, November 23, 9:00 am

Sheet B	1	2	3	4	5	6	7	8	9	10	Final
Ireland (Wilson) 🔨	1	0	1	0	1	0	0	0	0	0	3
Poland (Stych)	0	2	0	1	0	0	0	1	2	1	7

Sheet C	1	2	3	4	5	6	7	8	9	10	Final
Spain (Vez) 🔨	0	0	1	0	0	1	0	0	X	X	2
Denmark (Schmidt)	2	2	0	0	4	0	1	1	X	X	10

===== Bronze medal game =====
Saturday, November 23, 2:30 pm

Sheet E	1	2	3	4	5	6	7	8	9	10	Final
Spain (Vez)	0	0	1	1	1	0	0	1	0	X	4
Ireland (Wilson) 🔨	0	0	0	0	0	2	0	0	1	X	3

===== Gold medal game =====
Saturday, November 23, 2:30 pm

Sheet D	1	2	3	4	5	6	7	8	9	10	Final
Denmark (Schmidt) 🔨	1	0	1	0	0	2	0	1	0	X	5
Poland (Stych)	0	0	0	0	1	0	1	0	0	X	2

==== Final standings ====
Key
Teams Qualify for 2025 A Division
Teams Relegated to 2025 C Division

Place	Team
1st place, gold medalist(s)	Denmark
2nd place, silver medalist(s)	Poland
3rd place, bronze medalist(s)	Spain
4	Ireland
5	Belgium
5	Turkey
7	Ukraine
8	France
9	Finland
10	Hungary
11	Slovakia
12	Estonia
13	Wales
14	Israel
15	Latvia
16	Bulgaria

=== C Division ===
==== Teams ====
The teams are listed as follows:

Andorra	Bosnia and Herzegovina	Bulgaria	Croatia
Skip: Josep Garcia; Third: Enric Morral; Second: César Mialdea; Lead: Valentín Ortiz	Skip: Mak Dorić; Third: Vladan Savić; Second: Slavenko Ignjić; Lead: Igor Marković; Alternate: Bojan Macar	Skip: Reto Seiler; Third: Bojidar Momerin; Second: Tihomir Todorov; Lead: Stanimir Petrov; Alternate: Nikolay Runtov	Fourth: Hrvoje Tolić; Skip: Ante Baus; Second: Miroslav Jurković; Lead: Bruno Samardzic; Alternate: Vedran Horvat
Georgia	Israel	Romania	Slovenia
Fourth: Kakha Ambrolava; Skip: Davit Minasiani; Second: Kakha Kurtanidze; Lead: Shalva Khachidze	Skip: Alex Pokras; Third: Dmitry Abanin; Second: Lawrence Sidney; Lead: Jeffrey Yaakov Lutz	Skip: Allen Coliban; Third: Cristian Matau; Second: Bogdan Colceriu; Lead: Matei Felecan; Alternate: Dan Ghergie	Skip: Gaber Bor Zelinka; Third: Jakob Omerzel; Second: Simon Langus; Lead: Javor Brin Zelinka; Alternate: Noel Gregori

==== Round robin standings ====
Final Round Robin Standings

Key
Teams to Playoffs

Country	Skip	W	L	W–L	DSC
Bulgaria	Reto Seiler	7	0	–	71.62
Israel	Alex Pokras	5	2	1–1	58.84
Slovenia	Gaber Bor Zelinka	5	2	1–1	59.82
Romania	Allen Coliban	5	2	1–1	67.56
Croatia	Ante Baus	3	4	–	126.48
Andorra	Josep Garcia	2	5	–	113.27
Bosnia and Herzegovina	Mak Dorić	1	6	–	112.95
Georgia	Davit Minasiani	0	7	–	–

Round Robin Summary Table
Pos.	Country	Andorra	Bosnia and Herzegovina	Bulgaria	Croatia	Georgia	Israel	Romania	Slovenia	Record
6	Andorra	—	10–5	1–11	6–8	W–L	4–7	3–8	2–11	2–5
7	Bosnia and Herzegovina	5–10	—	5–9	1–9	W–L	4–12	5–6	4–6	1–6
1	Bulgaria	11–1	9–5	—	7–1	W–L	6–4	11–1	9–7	7–0
5	Croatia	8–6	9–1	1–7	—	W–L	3–11	5–9	3–4	3–4
8	Georgia	L–W	L–W	L–W	L–W	—	L–W	L–W	L–W	0–7
2	Israel	7–4	12–4	4–6	11–3	W–L	—	5–7	8–6	5–2
4	Romania	8–3	6–5	1–11	9–5	W–L	7–5	—	3–8	5–2
3	Slovenia	11–2	6–4	7–9	4–3	W–L	6–8	8–3	—	5–2

==== Playoffs ====
Semifinals
1	Bulgaria	10
4	Romania	5
2	Israel	7
3	Slovenia	6

Gold medal game
1	Bulgaria	7
2	Israel	4
Bronze medal game
4	Romania	3
3	Slovenia	6

===== Semifinals =====
Saturday, May 4, 9:00

Sheet B	1	2	3	4	5	6	7	8	Final
Bulgaria (Seiler) 🔨	0	0	2	1	3	0	4	X	10
Romania (Coliban)	3	1	0	0	0	1	0	X	5

Sheet D	1	2	3	4	5	6	7	8	Final
Israel (Pokras) 🔨	1	0	3	0	0	2	0	1	7
Slovenia (Zelinka)	0	1	0	2	1	0	2	0	6

===== Bronze medal game =====
Saturday, May 4, 14:30

Sheet A	1	2	3	4	5	6	7	8	Final
Romania (Coliban)	0	0	2	0	0	0	1	X	3
Slovenia (Zelinka) 🔨	0	0	0	3	2	1	0	X	6

===== Gold medal game =====
Saturday, May 4, 14:30

Sheet C	1	2	3	4	5	6	7	8	Final
Bulgaria (Seiler) 🔨	1	1	0	2	0	3	0	X	7
Israel (Pokras)	0	0	1	0	1	0	2	X	4

==== Final standings ====
Key
Promoted to 2024 B division

Place	Team
1st place, gold medalist(s)	Bulgaria
2nd place, silver medalist(s)	Israel
3rd place, bronze medalist(s)	Slovenia
4	Romania
5	Croatia
6	Andorra
7	Bosnia and Herzegovina
8	Georgia

== Women ==
=== A division ===
==== Qualification ====
The following nations qualified to participate in the 2024 European Curling Championship:

Event	Vacancies	Qualified
2023 European Curling Championships A Division	8	Switzerland; Italy; Norway; Sweden; Scotland; Estonia; Denmark; Turkey
2023 European Curling Championships B Division	2	Hungary; Lithuania
TOTAL	10	

==== Teams ====
The teams are listed as follows:

Denmark	Estonia	Hungary	Italy	Lithuania
Skip: Madeleine Dupont; Third: Mathilde Halse; Second: Denise Dupont; Lead: My Larsen; Alternate: Jasmin Holtermann	Fourth: Erika Tuvike; Third: Kerli Laidsalu; Skip: Liisa Turmann; Lead: Heili Grossmann	Fourth: Linda Joó; Skip: Vera Kalocsai-van Dorp; Second: Orosolya Tóth-Csősz; Lead: Hanna Orbán; Alternate: Laura Lauchsz	Skip: Stefania Constantini; Third: Giulia Zardini Lacedelli; Second: Elena Mathis; Lead: Angela Romei; Alternate: Marta Lo Deserto	Skip: Virginija Paulauskaitė; Third: Olga Dvojeglazova; Second: Miglė Kiudytė; Lead: Rūta Blažienė
Norway	Scotland	Sweden	Switzerland	Turkey
Fourth: Kristin Skaslien; Skip: Marianne Rørvik; Second: Mille Haslev Nordbye; Lead: Eilin Kjærland; Alternate: Ingeborg Forbregd	Fourth: Rebecca Morrison; Third: Jennifer Dodds; Second: Sophie Sinclair; Skip: Sophie Jackson; Alternate: Fay Henderson	Skip: Anna Hasselborg; Third: Sara McManus; Second: Agnes Knochenhauer; Lead: Sofia Mabergs; Alternate: Johanna Heldin	Fourth: Alina Pätz; Skip: Silvana Tirinzoni; Second: Carole Howald; Lead: Selina Witschonke; Alternate: Stefanie Berset	Skip: Dilşat Yıldız; Third: Öznur Polat; Second: İfayet Şafak Çalıkuşu; Lead: Berfin Şengül; Alternate: İclal Karaman

==== Round robin standings ====
Final Round Robin Standings

Key
Teams to Playoffs and Qualified for the 2025 World Women's Curling Championship
Teams Qualified for the 2025 World Women's Curling Championship
Teams Relegated to 2025 B Division

Country	Skip	W	L	W–L	PF	PA	EW	EL	BE	SE	S%	DSC
Switzerland	Silvana Tirinzoni	9	0	–	72	35	43	28	4	13	81.1%	22.52
Sweden	Anna Hasselborg	7	2	–	67	49	44	33	7	12	82.5%	23.05
Scotland	Sophie Jackson	6	3	1–0	61	45	37	31	7	10	84.0%	44.13
Italy	Stefania Constantini	6	3	0–1	71	58	44	37	4	13	82.5%	30.81
Denmark	Madeleine Dupont	5	4	1–0	66	46	39	32	4	14	77.9%	43.74
Turkey	Dilşat Yıldız	5	4	0–1	65	58	41	37	4	12	75.4%	38.74
Norway	Marianne Rørvik	4	5	–	61	55	38	35	2	10	79.7%	33.54
Lithuania	Virginija Paulauskaitė	1	8	1–1	40	82	28	46	2	5	65.5%	63.06
Estonia	Liisa Turmann	1	8	1–1	41	74	28	44	3	4	73.6%	66.56
Hungary	Vera Kalocsai-van Dorp	1	8	1–1	42	84	27	46	1	5	64.7%	66.94

Round Robin Summary Table
Pos.	Country	Denmark	Estonia	Hungary	Italy	Lithuania	Norway	Scotland	Sweden	Switzerland	Turkey	Record
5	Denmark	—	9–4	8–1	5–6	9–2	11–4	9–11	5–7	2–4	8–7	5–4
9	Estonia	4–9	—	6–10	6–12	10–7	3–9	1–8	2–8	5–6	4–5	1–8
10	Hungary	1–8	10–6	—	6–9	6–8	5–9	3–9	8–10	1–13	2–12	1–8
4	Italy	6–5	12–6	9–6	—	11–4	7–6	5–9	4–8	6–7	11–7	6–3
8	Lithuania	2–9	7–10	8–6	4–11	—	1–9	2–9	5–8	7–8	4–12	1–8
7	Norway	4–11	9–3	9–5	6–7	9–1	—	4–5	6–8	4–9	10–6	4–5
3	Scotland	11–9	8–1	9–3	9–5	9–2	5–4	—	5–8	1–8	4–5	6–3
2	Sweden	7–5	8–2	10–8	8–4	8–5	8–6	8–5	—	5–7	5–7	7–2
1	Switzerland	4–2	6–5	13–1	7–6	8–7	9–4	8–1	7–5	—	10–4	9–0
6	Turkey	7–8	5–4	12–2	7–11	12–4	6–10	5–4	7–5	4–10	—	5–4

==== Round robin results ====
All draw times are listed in Eastern European Summer Time (UTC+03:00).

===== Draw 1 =====
Saturday, November 16, 9:00 am

Sheet A	1	2	3	4	5	6	7	8	9	10	Final
Sweden (Hasselborg)	0	2	0	0	2	1	0	2	1	X	8
Scotland (Jackson) 🔨	1	0	0	2	0	0	2	0	0	X	5

Sheet B	1	2	3	4	5	6	7	8	9	10	Final
Turkey (Yıldız)	0	1	0	1	0	2	0	0	2	0	6
Norway (Rørvik) 🔨	3	0	1	0	1	0	1	1	0	3	10

Sheet C	1	2	3	4	5	6	7	8	9	10	Final
Italy (Constantini) 🔨	1	3	3	0	3	0	1	X	X	X	11
Lithuania (Paulauskaitė)	0	0	0	2	0	2	0	X	X	X	4

Sheet D	1	2	3	4	5	6	7	8	9	10	Final
Switzerland (Tirinzoni) 🔨	1	0	0	1	0	0	0	1	1	X	4
Denmark (Dupont)	0	1	0	0	0	1	0	0	0	X	2

Sheet E	1	2	3	4	5	6	7	8	9	10	Final
Hungary (Kalocsai-van Dorp)	0	1	2	0	5	0	0	1	1	X	10
Estonia (Turmann) 🔨	1	0	0	3	0	1	1	0	0	X	6

===== Draw 2 =====
Saturday, November 16, 7:30 pm

Sheet A	1	2	3	4	5	6	7	8	9	10	Final
Norway (Rørvik)	0	0	1	0	0	2	0	1	0	X	4
Switzerland (Tirinzoni) 🔨	0	1	0	2	1	0	1	0	4	X	9

Sheet B	1	2	3	4	5	6	7	8	9	10	11	Final
Scotland (Jackson)	0	2	0	2	1	0	2	0	2	0	2	11
Denmark (Dupont) 🔨	1	0	2	0	0	3	0	2	0	1	0	9

Sheet C	1	2	3	4	5	6	7	8	9	10	Final
Hungary (Kalocsai-van Dorp) 🔨	2	0	4	0	0	2	0	0	0	0	8
Sweden (Hasselborg)	0	1	0	2	1	0	1	2	2	1	10

Sheet D	1	2	3	4	5	6	7	8	9	10	Final
Estonia (Turmann)	0	3	0	1	0	2	0	2	0	2	10
Lithuania (Paulauskaitė) 🔨	1	0	1	0	2	0	1	0	2	0	7

Sheet E	1	2	3	4	5	6	7	8	9	10	Final
Turkey (Yıldız) 🔨	1	0	1	1	0	0	2	0	2	0	7
Italy (Constantini)	0	2	0	0	2	1	0	3	0	3	11

===== Draw 3 =====
Sunday, November 17, 2:00 pm

Sheet A	1	2	3	4	5	6	7	8	9	10	Final
Lithuania (Paulauskaitė)	1	0	0	1	0	2	0	0	0	X	4
Turkey (Yıldız) 🔨	0	2	2	0	1	0	1	3	3	X	12

Sheet B	1	2	3	4	5	6	7	8	9	10	Final
Sweden (Hasselborg) 🔨	0	1	2	0	0	2	0	1	2	X	8
Estonia (Turmann)	0	0	0	1	0	0	1	0	0	X	2

Sheet C	1	2	3	4	5	6	7	8	9	10	Final
Scotland (Jackson)	0	0	1	0	0	0	X	X	X	X	1
Switzerland (Tirinzoni) 🔨	0	3	0	1	3	1	X	X	X	X	8

Sheet D	1	2	3	4	5	6	7	8	9	10	Final
Italy (Constantini)	0	1	0	1	0	2	2	0	3	X	9
Hungary (Kalocsai-van Dorp) 🔨	2	0	1	0	2	0	0	1	0	X	6

Sheet E	1	2	3	4	5	6	7	8	9	10	Final
Norway (Rørvik)	0	1	0	3	0	0	0	0	X	X	4
Denmark (Dupont) 🔨	2	0	1	0	0	3	3	2	X	X	11

===== Draw 4 =====
Monday, November 18, 8:00 am

Sheet A	1	2	3	4	5	6	7	8	9	10	Final
Denmark (Dupont)	0	0	4	1	1	1	1	X	X	X	8
Hungary (Kalocsai-van Dorp) 🔨	0	1	0	0	0	0	0	X	X	X	1

Sheet B	1	2	3	4	5	6	7	8	9	10	Final
Italy (Constantini)	0	1	0	2	0	1	0	1	1	0	6
Switzerland (Tirinzoni) 🔨	1	0	3	0	1	0	1	0	0	1	7

Sheet C	1	2	3	4	5	6	7	8	9	10	Final
Estonia (Turmann) 🔨	0	0	0	1	0	0	0	2	0	X	3
Norway (Rørvik)	0	2	1	0	0	2	1	0	3	X	9

Sheet D	1	2	3	4	5	6	7	8	9	10	Final
Lithuania (Paulauskaitė)	0	1	0	0	1	0	2	0	1	X	5
Sweden (Hasselborg) 🔨	3	0	0	1	0	1	0	3	0	X	8

Sheet E	1	2	3	4	5	6	7	8	9	10	Final
Scotland (Jackson)	0	1	0	1	1	0	0	0	1	0	4
Turkey (Yıldız) 🔨	0	0	1	0	0	1	0	0	0	3	5

===== Draw 5 =====
Monday, November 18, 4:00 pm

Sheet A	1	2	3	4	5	6	7	8	9	10	Final
Italy (Constantini)	1	0	0	2	0	0	2	1	0	1	7
Norway (Rørvik) 🔨	0	0	2	0	3	0	0	0	1	0	6

Sheet B	1	2	3	4	5	6	7	8	9	10	Final
Hungary (Kalocsai-van Dorp)	0	0	1	1	0	1	0	X	X	X	3
Scotland (Jackson) 🔨	2	3	0	0	2	0	2	X	X	X	9

Sheet C	1	2	3	4	5	6	7	8	9	10	Final
Sweden (Hasselborg) 🔨	1	0	0	0	2	1	0	2	0	1	7
Denmark (Dupont)	0	0	2	0	0	0	1	0	2	0	5

Sheet D	1	2	3	4	5	6	7	8	9	10	Final
Turkey (Yıldız)	0	0	1	0	2	1	0	0	0	1	5
Estonia (Turmann) 🔨	0	2	0	1	0	0	1	0	0	0	4

Sheet E	1	2	3	4	5	6	7	8	9	10	Final
Switzerland (Tirinzoni) 🔨	1	1	1	0	0	2	0	3	0	0	8
Lithuania (Paulauskaitė)	0	0	0	2	1	0	1	0	2	1	7

===== Draw 6 =====
Tuesday, November 19, 9:00 am

Sheet A	1	2	3	4	5	6	7	8	9	10	Final
Hungary (Kalocsai-van Dorp)	0	0	1	0	3	1	0	0	0	1	6
Lithuania (Paulauskaitė) 🔨	0	1	0	2	0	0	3	1	1	0	8

Sheet B	1	2	3	4	5	6	7	8	9	10	Final
Norway (Rørvik)	0	0	2	0	1	0	2	0	1	0	6
Sweden (Hasselborg) 🔨	0	1	0	1	0	1	0	2	0	3	8

Sheet C	1	2	3	4	5	6	7	8	9	10	Final
Switzerland (Tirinzoni) 🔨	2	3	2	0	0	1	0	2	X	X	10
Turkey (Yıldız)	0	0	0	2	1	0	1	0	X	X	4

Sheet D	1	2	3	4	5	6	7	8	9	10	11	Final
Denmark (Dupont)	0	0	1	0	0	0	2	0	0	2	0	5
Italy (Constantini) 🔨	0	1	0	1	1	1	0	0	1	0	1	6

Sheet E	1	2	3	4	5	6	7	8	9	10	Final
Estonia (Turmann)	0	0	0	0	0	1	0	X	X	X	1
Scotland (Jackson) 🔨	0	3	0	2	1	0	2	X	X	X	8

===== Draw 7 =====
Tuesday, November 19, 7:00 pm

Sheet A	1	2	3	4	5	6	7	8	9	10	Final
Turkey (Yıldız) 🔨	2	0	0	0	3	0	0	1	1	0	7
Denmark (Dupont)	0	2	0	1	0	3	1	0	0	1	8

Sheet B	1	2	3	4	5	6	7	8	9	10	Final
Estonia (Turmann)	0	3	0	0	1	1	1	0	0	X	6
Italy (Constantini) 🔨	2	0	3	3	0	0	0	2	2	X	12

Sheet C	1	2	3	4	5	6	7	8	9	10	Final
Lithuania (Paulauskaitė)	0	0	0	1	0	1	0	0	X	X	2
Scotland (Jackson) 🔨	0	1	1	0	3	0	2	2	X	X	9

Sheet D	1	2	3	4	5	6	7	8	9	10	Final
Hungary (Kalocsai-van Dorp)	0	1	1	0	0	1	0	2	0	X	5
Norway (Rørvik) 🔨	1	0	0	2	3	0	2	0	1	X	9

Sheet E	1	2	3	4	5	6	7	8	9	10	Final
Sweden (Hasselborg)	0	0	0	2	0	1	1	0	1	0	5
Switzerland (Tirinzoni) 🔨	2	0	0	0	3	0	0	1	0	1	7

===== Draw 8 =====
Wednesday, November 20, 2:00 pm

Sheet A	1	2	3	4	5	6	7	8	9	10	Final
Scotland (Jackson) 🔨	2	0	1	2	0	1	0	0	1	2	9
Italy (Constantini)	0	1	0	0	1	0	2	1	0	0	5

Sheet B	1	2	3	4	5	6	7	8	9	10	Final
Switzerland (Tirinzoni) 🔨	2	0	1	4	3	3	X	X	X	X	13
Hungary (Kalocsai-van Dorp)	0	1	0	0	0	0	X	X	X	X	1

Sheet C	1	2	3	4	5	6	7	8	9	10	Final
Denmark (Dupont) 🔨	0	2	0	1	0	3	2	0	1	X	9
Estonia (Turmann)	0	0	1	0	1	0	0	2	0	X	4

Sheet D	1	2	3	4	5	6	7	8	9	10	Final
Sweden (Hasselborg) 🔨	1	0	2	0	1	0	1	0	0	0	5
Turkey (Yıldız)	0	1	0	2	0	1	0	1	1	1	7

Sheet E	1	2	3	4	5	6	7	8	9	10	Final
Lithuania (Paulauskaitė)	0	0	0	0	1	0	0	X	X	X	1
Norway (Rørvik) 🔨	1	2	1	1	0	3	1	X	X	X	9

===== Draw 9 =====
Thursday, November 21, 9:00 am

Sheet A	1	2	3	4	5	6	7	8	9	10	Final
Switzerland (Tirinzoni) 🔨	1	0	0	1	0	1	1	0	1	1	6
Estonia (Turmann)	0	1	1	0	2	0	0	1	0	0	5

Sheet B	1	2	3	4	5	6	7	8	9	10	Final
Denmark (Dupont)	0	1	3	0	1	1	1	2	X	X	9
Lithuania (Paulauskaitė) 🔨	0	0	0	2	0	0	0	0	X	X	2

Sheet C	1	2	3	4	5	6	7	8	9	10	Final
Turkey (Yıldız) 🔨	2	0	2	1	1	2	0	4	X	X	12
Hungary (Kalocsai-van Dorp)	0	1	0	0	0	0	1	0	X	X	2

Sheet D	1	2	3	4	5	6	7	8	9	10	Final
Norway (Rørvik)	0	0	1	0	1	0	0	1	1	0	4
Scotland (Jackson) 🔨	0	1	0	1	0	0	2	0	0	1	5

Sheet E	1	2	3	4	5	6	7	8	9	10	Final
Italy (Constantini) 🔨	0	1	0	1	0	1	1	0	0	0	4
Sweden (Hasselborg)	0	0	1	0	1	0	0	4	1	1	8

==== Playoffs ====
Semifinals
1	Switzerland	7
4	Italy	3
2	Sweden	6
3	Scotland	4

Gold medal game
1	Switzerland	8
2	Sweden	4
Bronze medal game
4	Italy	4
3	Scotland	6

===== Semifinals =====
Thursday, November 21, 7:00 pm

Sheet B	1	2	3	4	5	6	7	8	9	10	Final
Sweden (Hasselborg) 🔨	0	0	0	0	3	0	1	0	1	1	6
Scotland (Jackson)	0	0	1	0	0	2	0	1	0	0	4

Player percentages
Sweden		Scotland	
Sofia Mabergs	83%	Sophie Jackson	88%
Agnes Knochenhauer	63%	Sophie Sinclair	93%
Sara McManus	76%	Jennifer Dodds	76%
Anna Hasselborg	80%	Rebecca Morrison	79%
Total	75%	Total	84%

Sheet D	1	2	3	4	5	6	7	8	9	10	Final
Switzerland (Tirinzoni) 🔨	2	0	0	0	0	4	1	0	X	X	7
Italy (Constantini)	0	0	1	0	1	0	0	1	X	X	3

Player percentages
Switzerland		Italy	
Selina Witschonke	92%	Marta Lo Deserto	94%
Carole Howald	89%	Elena Mathis	80%
Silvana Tirinzoni	88%	Giulia Zardini Lacedelli	84%
Alina Pätz	84%	Stefania Constantini	83%
Total	88%	Total	85%

===== Bronze medal game =====
Friday, November 22, 2:00 pm

Sheet C	1	2	3	4	5	6	7	8	9	10	Final
Italy (Constantini)	0	0	0	0	1	0	0	2	0	1	4
Scotland (Jackson) 🔨	1	0	1	1	0	0	3	0	0	0	6

Player percentages
Italy		Scotland	
Angela Romei	96%	Sophie Jackson	96%
Elena Mathis	71%	Sophie Sinclair	87%
Giulia Zardini Lacedelli	90%	Jennifer Dodds	88%
Stefania Constantini	80%	Rebecca Morrison	93%
Total	84%	Total	91%

===== Gold medal game =====
Saturday, November 23, 10:00 am

Sheet C	1	2	3	4	5	6	7	8	9	10	Final
Switzerland (Tirinzoni) 🔨	2	1	0	0	2	0	2	0	1	X	8
Sweden (Hasselborg)	0	0	0	1	0	1	0	2	0	X	4

Player percentages
Switzerland		Sweden	
Selina Witschonke	89%	Sofia Mabergs	96%
Carole Howald	81%	Agnes Knochenhauer	75%
Silvana Tirinzoni	93%	Sara McManus	83%
Alina Pätz	90%	Anna Hasselborg	76%
Total	89%	Total	83%

==== Player percentages ====
Round robin only

Leads	%
(Scotland) Sophie Jackson (Skip)	88.8
(Italy) Angela Romei	85.9
(Denmark) My Larsen	83.9
(Sweden) Sofia Mabergs	83.9
(Estonia) Heili Grossmann	83.1

Seconds	%
(Sweden) Agnes Knochenhauer	84.7
(Scotland) Sophie Sinclair	84.6
(Italy) Elena Mathis	82.6
(Norway) Mille Haslev Nordbye	82.2
(Switzerland) Carole Howald	81.8

Thirds	%
(Sweden) Sara McManus	81.7
(Denmark) Mathilde Halse	80.7
(Norway) Marianne Rørvik (Skip)	80.6
(Italy) Giulia Zardini Lacedelli	80.0
(Switzerland) Silvana Tirinzoni (Skip)	79.9

Skips	%
(Scotland) Rebecca Morrison (Fourth)	83.4
(Switzerland) Alina Pätz (Fourth)	80.8
(Sweden) Anna Hasselborg	79.7
(Italy) Stefania Constantini	79.5
(Turkey) Dilşat Yıldız	74.6

==== Final standings ====
Key
Teams Advance to the 2025 World Women's Curling Championship
Teams Relegated to 2025 B Division

Place	Team
1st place, gold medalist(s)	Switzerland
2nd place, silver medalist(s)	Sweden
3rd place, bronze medalist(s)	Scotland
4	Italy
5	Denmark
6	Turkey
7	Norway
8	Lithuania
9	Estonia
10	Hungary

=== B division ===
==== Teams ====
The teams are listed as follows:

Austria	Czech Republic	England	Finland	Germany
Fourth: Hannah Augustin; Skip: Verena Pflügler; Second: Teresa Treichl; Lead: Johanna Höss; Alternate: Emma Müller	Skip: Zuzana Paulová; Third: Alžběta Zelingrová; Second: Michaela Baudyšová; Lead: Aneta Müllerová; Alternate: Karolína Špundová	Fourth: Anna Fowler; Skip: Hetty Garnier; Second: Angharad Ward; Lead: Lisa Farnell; Alternate: Naomi Robinson	Skip: Miia Ahrenberg; Third: Ella Eivola; Second: Inka Mustajoki; Lead: Lara Sajaniemi; Alternate: Mariia Kiiskinen	Fourth: Kim Sutor; Skip: Sara Messenzehl; Second: Zoé Antes; Lead: Joy Sutor; Alternate: Pia-Lisa Schöll
Latvia	Netherlands	Poland	Slovenia	Ukraine
Fourth: Agate Regža; Third: Darta Regža; Second: Anete Zābere; Skip: Evita Regža; Alternate: Dace Regža	Fourth: Vannesa Tonoli; Skip: Lisenka Bomas; Second: Linde Nas; Lead: Marit van Valkenhoef; Alternate: Anandi Bomas	Skip: Aneta Lipińska; Third: Ewa Nogły; Second: Marta Leszczyńska; Lead: Magdalena Kołodziej; Alternate: Julia Dyderska	Skip: Maruša Gorišek; Third: Nadja Pipan; Second: Ajda Zavrtanik Drglin; Lead: Liza Gregori; Alternate: Nina Kremzar	Skip: Yaroslava Kalinichenko; Third: Diana Moskalenko; Second: Oleksandra Kononenko; Lead: Anastasiia Mosol

Note: Wales secured a spot in B Division by winning the silver medal at the C Division Event held earlier this year. However, they opted not to participate, allowing the bronze medalist, Ukraine, to take their place.

==== Round robin standings ====
Final Round Robin Standings

Key
Teams to Playoffs
Teams Relegated to 2025 C Division

Country	Skip	W	L	W–L	DSC
Czech Republic	Zuzana Paulová	8	1	1–0	42.88
Germany	Sara Messenzehl	8	1	0–1	47.98
Netherlands	Lisenka Bomas	6	3	1–1	43.77
Poland	Aneta Lipińska	6	3	1–1	53.48
England	Hetty Garnier	6	3	1–1	74.79
Slovenia	Maruša Gorišek	4	5	–	66.48
Latvia	Evita Regža	3	6	1–0	82.51
Austria	Verena Pflügler	3	6	0–1	57.07
Finland	Miia Ahrenberg	1	8	–	87.69
Ukraine	Yaroslava Kalinichenko	0	9	–	134.84

Round Robin Summary Table
Pos.	Country	Austria	Czech Republic	England	Finland	Germany	Latvia	Netherlands	Poland	Slovenia	Ukraine	Record
8	Austria	—	9–4	5–9	7–4	3–6	5–9	7–8	1–6	4–11	12–4	3–6
1	Czech Republic	4–9	—	8–4	10–4	7–4	11–1	8–7	11–7	7–5	10–1	8–1
5	England	9–5	4–8	—	10–2	3–8	10–8	6–7	5–4	12–7	5–3	6–3
9	Finland	4–7	4–10	2–10	—	6–8	5–7	5–12	2–12	5–11	10–9	1–8
2	Germany	6–3	4–7	8–3	8–6	—	13–3	10–2	7–5	9–6	10–3	8–1
7	Latvia	9–5	1–11	8–10	7–5	3–13	—	6–8	4–8	5–6	9–6	3–6
4	Netherlands	8–7	7–8	7–6	12–5	2–10	8–6	—	5–9	8–4	7–6	6–3
3	Poland	6–1	7–11	4–5	12–2	5–7	8–4	9–5	—	8–3	9–8	6–3
6	Slovenia	11–4	5–7	7–12	11–5	6–9	6–5	4–8	3–8	—	10–7	4–5
10	Ukraine	4–12	1–10	3–5	9–10	3–10	6–9	6–7	8–9	7–10	—	0–9

==== Playoffs ====
Semifinals
1	Czech Republic	9
4	Poland	6
2	Germany	12
3	Netherlands	6

Gold medal game
1	Czech Republic	8
2	Germany	5
Bronze medal game
4	Poland	11
3	Netherlands	4

===== Semifinals =====
Saturday, November 23, 9:00 am

Sheet D	1	2	3	4	5	6	7	8	9	10	Final
Czech Republic (Paulová) 🔨	0	3	0	0	0	2	3	1	0	X	9
Poland (Lipińska)	1	0	1	2	1	0	0	0	1	X	6

Sheet E	1	2	3	4	5	6	7	8	9	10	Final
Germany (Messenzehl) 🔨	2	0	5	0	0	1	4	0	X	X	12
Netherlands (Bomas)	0	1	0	3	0	0	0	2	X	X	6

===== Bronze medal game =====
Saturday, November 23, 2:30 pm

Sheet B	1	2	3	4	5	6	7	8	9	10	Final
Poland (Lipińska)	0	0	1	0	3	0	4	3	X	X	11
Netherlands (Bomas) 🔨	1	0	0	1	0	2	0	0	X	X	4

===== Gold medal game =====
Saturday, November 23, 2:30 pm

Sheet C	1	2	3	4	5	6	7	8	9	10	Final
Czech Republic (Paulová) 🔨	0	0	0	1	0	2	0	1	2	2	8
Germany (Messenzehl)	0	2	2	0	1	0	0	0	0	0	5

==== Final standings ====
Key
Teams Qualify for 2025 A Division
Teams Relegated to 2025 C Division

Place	Team
1st place, gold medalist(s)	Czech Republic
2nd place, silver medalist(s)	Germany
3rd place, bronze medalist(s)	Poland
4	Netherlands
5	England
6	Slovenia
7	Latvia
8	Austria
9	Finland
10	Ukraine

=== C Division ===
==== Teams ====
The teams are listed as follows:

Belgium	Croatia	France	Netherlands	Portugal
Fourth: Kim Catteceur; Skip: Veerle Geerinckx; Second: Yana Meyhi; Lead: Britt Meyhi	Skip: Iva Penava; Third: Iva Roso; Second: Zrinka Muhek; Lead: Morana Cuzela; Alternate: Luci Ana Pavelka	Fourth: Allison Brageul; Skip: Élodie Fuchs; Second: Élodie Verger; Lead: Sylvie Reist; Alternate: Lise Walter	Fourth: Vanessa Tonoli; Skip: Lisenka Bomas; Second: Anandi Bomas; Lead: Linde Nas; Alternate: Marit van Valkenhoef	Fourth: Antonieta Martins Ethier; Skip: Fiona Grace Simpson; Second: Irene Pita-Goodis; Lead: Graciete Martins Folster; Alternate: Susana Trindade
Romania	Slovakia	Spain	Ukraine	Wales
Skip: Iulia Trăilă; Third: Crina Boboc; Second: Ania Bacali; Lead: Octavia Traila	Skip: Gabriela Kajanová; Third: Silvia Sýkorová; Second: Linda Haferová; Lead: Daniela Matulová; Alternate: Zuzana Axamitová	Skip: Paula Olivan Salvador; Third: Marisol Arias Cordoba; Second: Laura Rodriguez Romeo; Lead: Emma Lopez Perez; Alternate: Maria Victoria Ainsa Galindo	Fourth: Yaroslava Kalinichenko; Skip: Diana Moskalenko; Second: Oleksandra Kononenko; Lead: Anastasiia Mosol	Skip: Laura Beever; Third: Judith Glazier; Second: Emily Simpson; Lead: Anna Carruthers

==== Round robin standings ====
Final Round Robin Standings

Key
Teams to Playoffs

Country	Skip	W	L	W–L	DSC
Slovakia	Gabriela Kajanová	8	1	1–0	99.86
Netherlands	Lisenka Bomas	8	1	0–1	44.21
Ukraine	Diana Moskalenko	6	3	1–0	64.89
Wales	Laura Beever	6	3	0–1	120.08
Spain	Paula Olivan Salvador	5	4	1–0	80.62
Portugal	Fiona Grace Simpson	5	4	0–1	82.83
Belgium	Veerle Geerinckx	3	6	1–0	106.67
France	Élodie Fuchs	3	6	0–1	109.98
Romania	Iulia Trăilă	1	8	–	145.42
Croatia	Iva Penava	0	9	–	139.94

Round Robin Summary Table
Pos.	Country	Belgium	Croatia	France	Netherlands	Portugal	Romania	Slovakia	Spain	Ukraine	Wales	Record
7	Belgium	—	8–7	5–3	4–14	5–9	6–3	2–8	5–8	2–9	1–6	3–6
10	Croatia	7–8	—	4–6	4–6	4–6	5–7	5–8	6–7	3–10	2–9	0–9
8	France	3–5	6–4	—	3–11	2–8	6–4	2–5	6–3	3–6	6–7	3–6
2	Netherlands	14–4	6–4	11–3	—	7–5	11–2	4–6	9–4	9–3	6–3	8–1
6	Portugal	9–5	6–4	8–2	5–7	—	9–3	1–12	5–9	4–3	4–5	5–4
9	Romania	3–6	7–5	4–6	2–11	3–9	—	3–7	3–10	4–7	3–11	1–8
1	Slovakia	8–2	8–5	5–2	6–4	12–1	7–3	—	4–11	7–6	8–7	8–1
5	Spain	8–5	7–6	3–6	4–9	9–5	10–3	11–4	—	3–4	5–6	5–4
3	Ukraine	9–2	10–3	6–3	3–9	3–4	7–4	6–7	4–3	—	10–3	6–3
4	Wales	6–1	9–2	7–6	3–6	5–4	11–3	7–8	6–5	3–10	—	6–3

==== Playoffs ====
Semifinals
1	Slovakia	1
4	Wales	11
2	Netherlands	8
3	Ukraine	7

Gold medal game
4	Wales	3
2	Netherlands	10
Bronze medal game
1	Slovakia	8
3	Ukraine	9

===== Semifinals =====
Saturday, May 4, 9:00

Sheet A	1	2	3	4	5	6	7	8	Final
Netherlands (Bomas) 🔨	0	0	2	0	4	0	1	1	8
Ukraine (Moskalenko)	1	2	0	1	0	3	0	0	7

Sheet C	1	2	3	4	5	6	7	8	Final
Slovakia (Kajanová) 🔨	0	0	0	1	0	0	X	X	1
Wales (Beever)	3	4	1	0	2	1	X	X	11

===== Bronze medal game =====
Saturday, May 4, 14:30

Sheet D	1	2	3	4	5	6	7	8	9	Final
Slovakia (Kajanová) 🔨	0	0	0	3	0	2	0	3	0	8
Ukraine (Moskalenko)	2	1	0	0	3	0	2	0	1	9

===== Gold medal game =====
Saturday, May 4, 14:30

Sheet B	1	2	3	4	5	6	7	8	Final
Wales (Beever)	0	0	1	0	2	0	X	X	3
Netherlands (Bomas) 🔨	3	5	0	1	0	1	X	X	10

==== Final standings ====
Key
Promoted to 2024 B division

Place	Team
1st place, gold medalist(s)	Netherlands
2nd place, silver medalist(s)	Wales
3rd place, bronze medalist(s)	Ukraine
4	Slovakia
5	Spain
6	Portugal
7	Belgium
8	France
9	Romania
10	Croatia
