= Laurens Hoekman =

Dutch curler

- Curler
- Born: 10 February 1998 (age 28); Zoetermeer, South Holland, Netherlands

Team
- Curling club: CC PWA Zoetermeer, Zoetermeer, NED
- Skip: Wouter Gösgens
- Third: Laurens Hoekman
- Second: Simon Spits
- Lead: Hessel Janssens
- Alternate: Jaap van Dorp

Curling career
- Member Association: Netherlands
- World Championship: 6 (2017, 2018, 2019, 2021, 2022, 2024)
- European Championship: 11 (2014, 2015, 2016, 2017, 2018, 2019, 2021, 2022, 2023, 2024, 2026)
- Other appearances: European Junior Challenge: 4 (2012, 2013, 2014, 2015)
Medal record
Curling
European Junior Challenge
Silver medal – second place	2014 Lohja
Bronze medal – third place	2012 Copenhagen
Bronze medal – third place	2013 Prague

Laurens Hoekman (born 10 February 1998 in Zoetermeer, South Holland, Netherlands) is a Dutch curler. He currently plays third on the Dutch men's curling team skipped by Wouter Gösgens.

== Teams ==
Season	Skip	Third	Second	Lead	Alternate	Coach	Events
2011–12	Diedrick Bontenbal	Floyd Koelewijn	Laurens Hoekman	Wouter Gösgens	Ezra Wiebe	Shari Leibbrandt-Demmon	EJCC 2012 (bronze)
2012–13	Floyd Koelewijn	Laurens Hoekman	Daan van der Vooren	Wouter Gösgens		Shari Leibbrandt-Demmon	EJCC 2013 (bronze)
2013–14	Wouter Gösgens	Laurens Hoekman	Stefano Miog	Tobias van den Hurk	Joey Bruinsma	Shari Leibbrandt-Demmon	EJCC 2014 (silver)
2014–15	Jaap van Dorp	Carlo Glasbergen	Wouter Gösgens	Joey Bruinsma	Laurens Hoekman	Shari Leibbrandt-Demmon	ECC 2014 (12th)
2014–15	Wouter Gösgens	Laurens Hoekman	Stefano Miog	Tobias van den Hurk	Joey Bruinsma	Shari Leibbrandt-Demmon	EJCC 2015 (5th)
2015–16	Jaap van Dorp	Wouter Gösgens	Laurens Hoekman	Carlo Glasbergen	Stefano Miog	Shari Leibbrandt-Demmon	ECC 2015 (10th)
2016–17	Jaap van Dorp	Wouter Gösgens	Laurens Hoekman	Carlo Glasbergen	Lars De Boom (ECC); Alexander Magan (WCC)	Shari Leibbrandt-Demmon	ECC 2016 (11th); WCC 2017 (11th)
2017–18	Jaap van Dorp	Wouter Gösgens	Laurens Hoekman	Carlo Glasbergen	Alexander Magan	Shari Leibbrandt-Demmon	ECC 2017 (7th); WCC 2018 (10th)
2018–19	Wouter Gösgens (Fourth)	Jaap van Dorp (Skip)	Laurens Hoekman	Carlo Glasbergen	Alexander Magan (ECC); Bart Klomp (WCC)	Shari Leibbrandt-Demmon	ECC 2018 (8th); WCC 2019 (10th)
2019–20	Wouter Gösgens (Fourth)	Jaap van Dorp (Skip)	Laurens Hoekman	Carlo Glasbergen	Alexander Magan	Shari Leibbrandt	ECC 2019 (8th)
2020–21	Wouter Gösgens (Fourth)	Jaap van Dorp (Skip)	Laurens Hoekman	Carlo Glasbergen	Tobias van den Hurk	Shari Leibbrandt	WCC 2021 (12th)
2021–22	Wouter Gösgens	Jaap van Dorp	Laurens Hoekman	Carlo Glasbergen	Tobias van den Hurk	Shari Leibbrandt	ECC 2021 (9th)
2022–23	Wouter Gösgens	Jaap van Dorp	Laurens Hoekman	Tobias van den Hurk	Alexander Magan	Shari Leibbrandt	ECC 2022 (11th); (gold) Division B
2023–24	Wouter Gösgens	Laurens Hoekman	Jaap van Dorp	Tobias van den Hurk	Alexander Magan	Shari Leibbrandt	ECC 2023 (7th); WCC 2024 (8th)
2024–25	Wouter Gösgens	Tobias van den Hurk	Laurens Hoekman	Alexander Magan	Simon Spits	Shari Leibbrandt	ECC 2024 (9th)
2025–26	Wouter Gösgens	Laurens Hoekman	Jaap van Dorp	Tobias van den Hurk	Alexander Magan	Shari Leibbrandt	
2026–27	Wouter Gösgens	Laurens Hoekman	Simon Spits	Hessel Janssens	Jaap van Dorp	Shari Leibbrandt	
