= Jaap van Dorp =

Dutch curler

- Curler
- Born: 25 February 1990 (age 36); Benthuizen, Netherlands

Team
- Curling club: CC PWA Zoetermeer, Zoetermeer, NED
- Skip: Wouter Gösgens
- Third: Laurens Hoekman
- Second: Simon Spits
- Lead: Hessel Janssens
- Alternate: Jaap van Dorp

Curling career
- Member Association: Netherlands
- World Championship: 6 (2017, 2018, 2019, 2021, 2022, 2024)
- European Championship: 13 (2011, 2012, 2013, 2014, 2015, 2016, 2017, 2018, 2019, 2021, 2022, 2023, 2026)
- Other appearances: European Junior Challenge: 5 (2007, 2008, 2009, 2010, 2011)

Jaap van Dorp (born 25 February 1990 in Benthuizen) is a Dutch curler from Waddinxveen. He is currently the alternate on the Dutch men's curling team skipped by Wouter Gösgens.

== Career ==
=== Juniors ===
Van Dorp represented the Netherlands in five European Junior Curling Challenges (2007 to 2011 inclusive), skipping the Dutch team in four (all but 2010). The team's best performance during this time was a 5th-place finish in 2010, when van Dorp threw third rocks for the team, which was skipped by Carlo Glasbergen. This was not enough to qualify the team for the World Junior Curling Championships.

=== Men's ===
Van Dorp has skipped the Netherlands team in the last seven (since 2011) European Curling Championships. At the 2011 European Curling Championships, van Dorp led his Dutch rink of Brian Doucet, Floyd Koelewijn and Carlo Glasbergen to a 23rd-place finish, or 7th in group A of the B Tournament. At the 2012 European Curling Championships, van Dorp, Glasbergen and new teammates Miles Maclure and Joey Bruinsma finished in 13th place, and 2nd in their group. At the 2013 European Curling Championships, van Dorp, Glasbergen, Bruinsma and new second Wouter Gösgens placed 14th, but remained in 2nd in the group. The 2014 European Curling Championships would be the best to date for van Dorp. The team finish 12th overall, narrowly losing to Finland in the B Tournament final. However, it was a good enough record to promote the Netherlands into group A for the 2015 European Curling Championships. Van Dorp would get to skip the Dutch team (consisting of Gösgens, Laurens Hoekman and Glasbergen) at the 2015 Euros, but the team was not ready for the A level, finishing in last (10th) place, but did manage two wins. The team was relegated to the B event at the 2016 European Curling Championships, which they would win. This put them in a playoff against Austria for the right to go to the 2017 Ford World Men's Curling Championship. They beat the Austrians two games to one in the best of three playoff, and would earn the Dutch their first spot at the Worlds since 1994. At the 2017 Worlds, van Dorp would lead the team to a 1–10 record, in 11th place. The team returned to the main A event at the 2017 European Curling Championships, and would finish with a 4–5 record, finishing in 7th place. The team then played in the Qualification event for the 2018 Winter Olympics, but did not qualify, winning just one game and losing six in the tournament. Their 7th place showing at the Euros qualified the team for the 2018 World Men's Curling Championship, where the team improved by going 4-8 and finishing 10th. They continued in the A-group of the 2018 European Curling Championships, where they would finish with a 2–7 record, finishing in 8th place overall, which meant no direct qualification for the 2019 World Men's Curling Championship. However, they did qualify for the 2019 World Qualification Event, where they finished the round robin with a 5–2 record. They won the 2–3 game against England, which meant they qualified for the 2019 World Men's Curling Championship for the third consecutive year. At the Worlds, he led his team to another 4–8 record, finishing 10th again. Later that year, van Dorp skipped the team at the 2019 European Curling Championships, finishing with a 3–6 record, in 8th place.

The eighth-place finish at the 2019 Euros was good enough to qualify the Dutch a spot at the 2020 World Men's Curling Championship. The event was cancelled however, due to the COVID-19 pandemic. The 2021 World Men's Curling Championship did occur in a fan-less bubble. There, van Dorp led his team to a 2–11 record, in 12th place.

Van Dorp has been playing in the World Curling Tour since 2012. He made his first final at the 2015 Swiss Cup Basel. He won his first event at the 2016 Stu Sells Oakville Tankard Tier 2 event. They won the 2018 WCT Moscow Classic, followed up by winning the Dumfries Challenger Series in the same year. He has also won the 2019 Curling Masters Champéry.

== Teammates ==
Event	Skip	Third	Second	Lead	Alternate	Result
2017 WCC	Jaap van Dorp	Wouter Gösgens	Laurens Hoekman	Carlo Glasbergen	Alexander Magan	11th (1–10)
2018 WCC	Jaap van Dorp	Wouter Gösgens	Laurens Hoekman	Carlo Glasbergen	Alexander Magan	10th (4–8)
2019 WCC	Wouter Gösgens (Fourth)	Jaap van Dorp (Skip)	Laurens Hoekman	Carlo Glasbergen	Alexander Magan	10th (4–8)
2021 WCC	Wouter Gösgens (Fourth)	Jaap van Dorp (Skip)	Laurens Hoekman	Carlo Glasbergen	Tobias van den Hurk	12th (2–11)

== Personal life ==
Van Dorp is employed as an engineer.
