= Wouter Gösgens =

Dutch curler (born 1998)

- Curler
- Born: 31 August 1998 (age 28); Voorburg, South Holland, Netherlands

Team
- Curling club: CC PWA Zoetermeer, Zoetermeer
- Skip: Wouter Gösgens
- Third: Laurens Hoekman
- Second: Simon Spits
- Lead: Hessel Janssens
- Alternate: Jaap van Dorp
- Mixed doubles partner: Lisenka Bomas

Curling career
- Member Association: Netherlands
- World Championship: 6 (2017, 2018, 2019, 2021, 2022, 2024)
- World Mixed Doubles Championship: 5 (2023, 2024, 2025, 2026, 2027)
- European Championship: 12 (2013, 2014, 2015, 2016, 2017, 2018, 2019, 2021, 2022, 2023, 2024, 2026)
- Other appearances: European Youth Olympic Winter Festival: 1 (2017), European Junior Challenge: 4 (2012, 2013, 2014, 2015)
Medal record
Curling
Representing Netherlands
European Youth Olympic Winter Festival
Silver medal – second place	2017 Erzurum
European Junior Challenge
Silver medal – second place	2014 Lohja
Bronze medal – third place	2012 Copenhagen
Bronze medal – third place	2013 Prague

Wouter Gösgens (born 31 August 1998 in Voorburg, South Holland, Netherlands) is a Dutch curler from Zoetermeer. He currently skips the Dutch men's curling team.

== Teams ==
Season	Skip	Third	Second	Lead	Alternate	Coach	Events
2011–12	Diedrick Bontenbal	Floyd Koelewijn	Laurens Hoekman	Wouter Gösgens	Ezra Wiebe	Shari Leibbrandt-Demmon	EJCC 2012 (bronze)
2012–13	Floyd Koelewijn	Laurens Hoekman	Daan van der Vooren	Wouter Gösgens		Shari Leibbrandt-Demmon	EJCC 2013 (bronze)
2013–14	Jaap van Dorp	Carlo Glasbergen	Wouter Gösgens	Joey Bruinsma	Floyd Koelewijn	Shari Leibbrandt-Demmon	ECC 2013 (14th)
2013–14	Wouter Gösgens	Laurens Hoekman	Stefano Miog	Tobias van den Hurk	Joey Bruinsma	Shari Leibbrandt-Demmon	EJCC 2014 (silver)
2014–15	Jaap van Dorp	Carlo Glasbergen	Wouter Gösgens	Joey Bruinsma	Laurens Hoekman	Shari Leibbrandt-Demmon	ECC 2014 (12th)
2014–15	Wouter Gösgens	Laurens Hoekman	Stefano Miog	Tobias van den Hurk	Joey Bruinsma	Shari Leibbrandt-Demmon	EJCC 2015 (5th)
2015–16	Jaap van Dorp	Wouter Gösgens	Laurens Hoekman	Carlo Glasbergen	Stefano Miog	Shari Leibbrandt-Demmon	ECC 2015 (10th)
2016–17	Jaap van Dorp	Wouter Gösgens	Laurens Hoekman	Carlo Glasbergen	Lars De Boom (ECC); Alexander Magan (WCC)	Shari Leibbrandt-Demmon	ECC 2016 (11th); WCC 2017 (11th)
2016–17	Wouter Gösgens	Jop Kuijpers	Bart Klomp	Olaf Bolkenbaas		Shari Leibbrandt-Demmon	EYOWF 2017 (silver)
2017–18	Jaap van Dorp	Wouter Gösgens	Laurens Hoekman	Carlo Glasbergen	Alexander Magan	Shari Leibbrandt-Demmon	ECC 2017 (7th); WCC 2018 (10th)
2018–19	Wouter Gösgens (Fourth)	Jaap van Dorp (Skip)	Laurens Hoekman	Carlo Glasbergen	Alexander Magan (ECC); Bart Klomp (WCC)	Shari Leibbrandt-Demmon	ECC 2018 (8th); WCC 2019 (10th)
2019–20	Wouter Gösgens (Fourth)	Jaap van Dorp (Skip)	Laurens Hoekman	Carlo Glasbergen	Alexander Magan	Shari Leibbrandt	ECC 2019 (8th)
2020–21	Wouter Gösgens (Fourth)	Jaap van Dorp (Skip)	Laurens Hoekman	Carlo Glasbergen	Tobias van den Hurk	Shari Leibbrandt	WCC 2021 (12th)
2021–22	Wouter Gösgens	Jaap van Dorp	Laurens Hoekman	Carlo Glasbergen	Tobias van den Hurk	Shari Leibbrandt	ECC 2021 (9th)
2022–23	Wouter Gösgens	Jaap van Dorp	Laurens Hoekman	Tobias van den Hurk	Alexander Magan	Shari Leibbrandt	ECC 2022 (11th); (gold) Division B
2023–24	Wouter Gösgens	Laurens Hoekman	Jaap van Dorp	Tobias van den Hurk	Alexander Magan	Shari Leibbrandt	ECC 2023 (7th); WCC 2024 (8th)
2024–25	Wouter Gösgens	Tobias van den Hurk	Laurens Hoekman	Alexander Magan	Simon Spits	Shari Leibbrandt	ECC 2024 (9th)
2025–26	Wouter Gösgens	Laurens Hoekman	Jaap van Dorp	Tobias van den Hurk	Alexander Magan	Shari Leibbrandt	
2026–27	Wouter Gösgens	Laurens Hoekman	Simon Spits	Hessel Janssens	Jaap van Dorp	Shari Leibbrandt	ECC 2026 (6th)

== Grand Slam record ==
Key
C	Champion
F	Lost in Final
SF	Lost in Semifinal
QF	Lost in Quarterfinals
R16	Lost in the round of 16
Q	Did not advance to playoffs
T2	Played in Tier 2 event
DNP	Did not participate in event
N/A	Not a Grand Slam event that season

Event	2019–20	2020–21	2021–22	2022–23	2023–24	2024–25
Tour Challenge	T2	N/A	N/A	DNP	Q	T2
Canadian Open	DNP	N/A	N/A	Q	DNP	DNP
