= Carlo Glasbergen =

Dutch curler

- Curler
- Other names: Curlo
- Born: 16 May 1990 (age 36); Benthuizen, Netherlands

Team
- Curling club: CC PWA Zoetermeer, Zoetermeer, NED
- Mixed doubles partner: Kimberly Glasbergen-Honders

Curling career
- Member Association: Netherlands
- World Championship: 5 (2017, 2018, 2019, 2021, 2022)
- European Championship: 10 (2011, 2012, 2013, 2014, 2015, 2016, 2017, 2018, 2019, 2021)
- Other appearances: European Junior Challenge: 5 (2007, 2008, 2009, 2010, 2011)

Carlo Glasbergen (born 16 May 1990 in Benthuizen) is a Dutch curler from Zoetermeer. During his career, he has played in ten European Curling Championships and five World Men's Curling Championships. He was the longtime lead on Team Jaap van Dorp.

Glasbergen won the Collie Campbell Memorial Award at the 2017 World Men's Curling Championship.

== Personal life ==
In 2017, Glasbergen worked as a data analyst for Vitality Management.

== Teammates ==
Event	Skip	Third	Second	Lead	Alternate	Result
2017 WCC	Jaap van Dorp	Wouter Gösgens	Laurens Hoekman	Carlo Glasbergen	Alexander Magan	11th (1–10)
2018 WCC	Jaap van Dorp	Wouter Gösgens	Laurens Hoekman	Carlo Glasbergen	Alexander Magan	10th (4–8)
2019 WCC	Wouter Gösgens (Fourth)	Jaap van Dorp (Skip)	Laurens Hoekman	Carlo Glasbergen	Alexander Magan	10th (4–8)
2021 WCC	Wouter Gösgens (Fourth)	Jaap van Dorp (Skip)	Laurens Hoekman	Carlo Glasbergen	Tobias van den Hurk	12th (2–11)
