= Shari Leibbrandt-Demmon =

Dutch curler and curling coach

Shari Leibbrandt-Demmon (born March 26, 1966, in Salmon Arm, British Columbia, Canada as Sharri Demmon) is a Canadian-Dutch curling coach who is the National Coach (Bondscoach) for Netherlands Topsport & Talent Curling Program. She coached the National Juniors from 2005 to 2014, Team van Dorp 2010–2013 and Men's National Selection Team 2014 to current. She also often coaches at International Camps for WCF and is the director of the Junior Division of the Curling Champions Tour.

As a junior curler, Leibbrandt-Demmon skipped a team at the 1984 British Columbia Junior Girls championships, finishing 5–4. She joined the Sandra Risebrough rink for the 1988–89 season as her third. The team lost to Debbie Shermack in the final of the 1989 Alberta Scott Tournament of Hearts. The next season, she joined the Cheryl Bernard rink at third, whom she played for before forming her own rink again for the next few seasons.

Leibrandt-Demmon got in a car accident in the Rocky Mountains that put a hiatus on her curling career. In the meantime, she moved to the Netherlands after meeting her husband online. She got back into the sport after her move. While in the Netherlands, she was the skip of the Dutch national team from 2004 to 2010. In 2004, she skipped the Netherlands to a 12th-place finish at the European Curling Championships. In 2005, she finished 7th place, earning the Netherlands a berth at the 2006 World Women's Curling Championship.

Leibbrandt-Demmon coached the Dutch men's team at the 2017 Ford World Men's Curling Championship.

== Personal life ==
Leibrandt-Demmon grew up in Golden, British Columbia, where she played basketball, bowling, softball, track and field and volleyball, in addition to curling. She would later move to Calgary to attend the Southern Alberta Institute of Technology. Leibbrandt-Demmon was married to Christian Leibbrandt, who was a technical official and curling photographer. He died in 2020 due to COVID-19. She resides in Boskoop.
