= 2026 World Mixed Doubles Qualification Event (January) =

- Host city: Dumfries, Scotland
- Arena: Dumfries Ice Bowl
- Dates: January 5–10
- Qualifiers: Netherlands; Hungary; France; China

The 2026 World Mixed Doubles Qualification Event was held from January 5 to 10, 2026 at the Dumfries Ice Bowl in Dumfries, Scotland. The top four placing teams qualified for the 2026 World Mixed Doubles Curling Championship in Geneva, Switzerland. This event was moved from its usual December date, where it had been held since 2019, to January to accommodate the packed schedule of the 2026 Olympic season. A record 33 teams are expected to participate in the event, surpassing the previous all-time high of 29 teams in 2024. Coinciding with the increase in the number of teams, the playoff field will be expanded from eight to twelve for the first time. This event also marked the debut of Pakistan in a world curling event.

== Teams ==
The teams are as follows:

Austria	Belgium	Brazil	China
Female: Hannah Augustin; Male: Martin Reichel	Female: Veerle Geerinckx; Male: Dirk Heylen	Female: Fabiana Campos; Male: Felipe Pires	Female: Ye Zixuan; Male: Yu Sen
Chinese Taipei	Croatia	England	France
Female: Amanda Chou; Male: Brendon Liu	Female: Morana Cuzela; Male: Vedran Horvat	Female: Rachael Hotchkiss; Male: Fraser Clark	Female: Stéphanie Barbarin; Male: Wilfrid Coulot
Guyana	Hong Kong	Hungary	India
Female: Farzana Hussain; Male: Rayad Husain	Female: Ling-Yue Hung; Male: Martin Yan	Female: Dorottya Udvardi-Palancsa; Male: Lorinc Tatar	Female: Richa Patel; Male: P. N. Raju
Ireland	Jamaica	Kenya	Latvia
Female: Ailsa Barron; Male: Kyle Paradis	Female: Stephanie Chen; Male: Justin Chen	Female: Yvette Winstone; Male: Rogen Muriithi	Female: Katrīna Gaidule; Male: Roberts Reinis Buncis
Lithuania	Luxembourg	Mexico	Netherlands
Female: Akvile Rykove; Male: Konstantin Rykov	Female: Betty Spurgeon; Male: Rick Chartrand	Female: Danielle Serra; Male: Diego Tompkins	Female: Vanessa Tonoli; Male: Laurens Hoekman
Nigeria	Pakistan	Philippines	Poland
Female: Jasmin Hashi; Male: Harold Woods III	Female: Sabena Islam; Male: Bilal Islam	Female: Katie Dubberstein; Male: Pedro Malvar	Female: Adela Walczak; Male: Andrzej Augustyniak
Portugal	Puerto Rico	Romania	Slovakia
Female: Antonieta Ethier; Male: Vítor Santos	Female: Linda Crank; Male: Robert Fisher	Female: Valentina Banghi; Male: Allen Coliban	Female: Daniela Matulová; Male: Milan Moravcik
Slovenia	Spain	Thailand	Turkey
Female: Ajda Zavrtanik-Drglin; Male: Jure Culic	Female: Daniela Revuelto; Male: Nicholas Shaw	Female: Phichayathida Jaosap; Male: Teekawin Jearateetawit	Female: Berfin Şengül; Male: Bilal Ömer Çakır
Ukraine			
Female: Diana Moskalenko; Male: Artem Suhak			

== Round robin standings ==
Final Round Robin Standings

Key
Teams to Playoffs

Group A	W	L	W–L	DSC
Netherlands	6	0	–	46.522
Ireland	4	2	1–0	96.956
Slovakia	4	2	0–1	102.100
Lithuania	3	3	–	63.822
India	2	4	1–0	75.422
Luxembourg	2	4	0–1	94.111
Kenya	0	6	–	199.600

Group B	W	L	W–L	DSC
China	6	0	–	68.311
Poland	5	1	–	39.822
England	3	3	1–1	67.767
Mexico	3	3	1–1	82.522
Pakistan	3	3	1–1	87.356
Belgium	1	5	–	128.700
Puerto Rico	0	6	–	120.078

Group C	W	L	W–L	DSC
Chinese Taipei	5	1	1–0	92.967
Austria	5	1	0–1	35.700
Jamaica	4	2	1–0	40.211
Turkey	4	2	0–1	53.156
Hong Kong	2	4	–	67.867
Croatia	1	5	–	98.967
Thailand	0	6	–	121.044

Group D	W	L	W–L	DSC
France	5	0	–	52.111
Philippines	4	1	–	58.878
Guyana	3	2	–	69.056
Ukraine	2	3	–	115.622
Spain	1	4	–	41.333
Nigeria	0	5	–	100.911

Group E	W	L	W–L	DSC
Hungary	4	1	1–0	49.433
Latvia	4	1	0–1	38.044
Slovenia	3	2	–	82.667
Portugal	2	3	1–0	59.000
Romania	2	3	0–1	134.178
Brazil	0	5	–	101.322

Ranking of 3rd Place Teams	Group	DSC
Jamaica	C	40.211
England	B	67.767
Guyana	D	69.056
Slovenia	E	82.667
Slovakia	A	102.100

Group A Round Robin Summary Table
Pos.	Country	India		Kenya	Lithuania	Luxembourg	Netherlands	Slovakia	Record
5	India	—	9–11	13–0	3–7	16–3	1–9	6–11	2–4
2	Ireland	11–9	—	10–1	6–8	11–6	2–10	6–4	4–2
7	Kenya	0–13	1–10	—	0–19	1–11	0–15	0–18	0–6
4	Lithuania	7–3	8–6	19–0	—	9–10	5–8	3–6	3–3
6	Luxembourg	3–16	6–11	11–1	10–9	—	2–12	10–11	2–4
1	Netherlands	9–1	10–2	15–0	8–5	12–2	—	12–1	6–0
3	Slovakia	11–6	4–6	18–0	6–3	11–10	1–12	—	4–2

Group B Round Robin Summary Table
Pos.	Country	Belgium	China	England	Mexico	Pakistan	Poland	Puerto Rico	Record
6	Belgium	—	0–8	4–8	L–W	5–7	5–14	11–6	1–5
1	China	8–0	—	9–3	10–8	9–6	6–3	14–2	6–0
3	England	8–4	3–9	—	8–4	7–8	2–9	11–3	3–3
4	Mexico	W–L	8–10	4–8	—	7–6	3–10	10–2	3–3
5	Pakistan	7–5	6–9	8–7	6–7	—	5–7	9–3	3–3
2	Poland	14–5	3–6	9–2	10–3	7–5	—	9–3	5–1
7	Puerto Rico	6–11	2–14	3–11	2–10	3–9	3–9	—	0–6

Group C Round Robin Summary Table
Pos.	Country	Austria	Chinese Taipei	Croatia	Hong Kong	Jamaica	Thailand	Türkiye	Record
2	Austria	—	7–8	11–1	8–3	9–3	11–1	8–4	5–1
1	Chinese Taipei	8–7	—	11–0	7–2	8–5	12–3	2–10	5–1
6	Croatia	1–11	0–11	—	5–7	4–9	8–4	3–7	1–5
5	Hong Kong	3–8	2–7	7–5	—	3–13	11–3	3–7	2–4
3	Jamaica	3–9	5–8	9–4	13–3	—	11–0	8–7	4–2
7	Thailand	1–11	3–12	4–8	3–11	0–11	—	3–9	0–6
4	Turkey	4–8	10–2	7–3	7–3	7–8	9–3	—	4–2

Group D Round Robin Summary Table
Pos.	Country	France	Guyana	Nigeria	Philippines	Spain	Ukraine	Record
1	France	—	10–5	14–1	9–3	10–6	9–8	5–0
3	Guyana	5–10	—	11–0	6–7	10–3	8–3	3–2
6	Nigeria	1–14	0–11	—	4–11	3–8	6–13	0–5
2	Philippines	3–9	7–6	11–4	—	7–6	9–5	4–1
5	Spain	6–10	3–10	8–3	6–7	—	6–9	1–4
4	Ukraine	8–9	3–8	13–6	5–9	9–6	—	2–3

Group E Round Robin Summary Table
Pos.	Country	Brazil	Hungary	Latvia	Portugal	Romania	Slovenia	Record
6	Brazil	—	4–11	3–11	0–10	2–9	0–10	0–5
1	Hungary	11–4	—	8–3	10–3	7–8	9–4	4–1
2	Latvia	11–3	3–8	—	7–5	8–5	7–2	4–1
4	Portugal	10–0	3–10	5–7	—	9–4	6–8	2–3
5	Romania	9–2	8–7	5–8	4–9	—	6–7	2–3
3	Slovenia	10–0	4–9	2–7	8–6	7–6	—	3–2

== Round robin results ==
All draw times are listed in Greenwich Mean Time (UTC+00:00).

=== Draw 1 ===
Monday, January 5, 9:00

Sheet A	1	2	3	4	5	6	7	8	Final
Mexico	0	0	1	0	0	1	1	0	3
Poland 🔨	1	1	0	4	1	0	0	3	10

Sheet B	1	2	3	4	5	6	7	8	Final
England 🔨	1	0	2	0	0	0	3	1	7
Pakistan	0	2	0	3	1	2	0	0	8

Sheet C	1	2	3	4	5	6	7	8	Final
Slovakia	0	0	4	4	0	3	0	X	11
India 🔨	1	2	0	0	1	0	2	X	6

Sheet D	1	2	3	4	5	6	7	8	Final
Netherlands 🔨	1	1	1	0	2	0	2	1	8
Lithuania	0	0	0	4	0	1	0	0	5

Sheet E	1	2	3	4	5	6	7	8	Final
China 🔨	2	1	1	1	1	2	X	X	8
Belgium	0	0	0	0	0	0	X	X	0

Sheet F	1	2	3	4	5	6	7	8	Final
Kenya	0	0	0	0	0	0	1	X	1
Ireland 🔨	2	2	2	1	1	2	0	X	10

=== Draw 2 ===
Monday, January 5, 12:30

Sheet C	1	2	3	4	5	6	7	8	Final
Thailand	0	0	0	0	0	0	X	X	0
Jamaica 🔨	1	2	1	1	3	3	X	X	11

Sheet D	1	2	3	4	5	6	7	8	Final
Turkey 🔨	0	2	1	0	1	0	3	X	7
Hong Kong	1	0	0	1	0	1	0	X	3

Sheet E	1	2	3	4	5	6	7	8	Final
Spain 🔨	2	0	0	1	2	0	1	X	6
Ukraine	0	3	1	0	0	5	0	X	9

Sheet F	1	2	3	4	5	6	7	8	Final
Chinese Taipei	1	0	4	1	0	1	0	1	8
Austria 🔨	0	3	0	0	1	0	3	0	7

=== Draw 3 ===
Monday, January 5, 16:00

Sheet A	1	2	3	4	5	6	7	8	Final
Latvia 🔨	5	0	0	2	1	0	3	X	11
Brazil	0	1	1	0	0	1	0	X	3

Sheet B	1	2	3	4	5	6	7	8	Final
Romania	0	1	0	1	0	1	1	X	4
Portugal 🔨	2	0	1	0	6	0	0	X	9

Sheet C	1	2	3	4	5	6	7	8	Final
France	1	1	1	3	0	5	3	X	14
Nigeria 🔨	0	0	0	0	1	0	0	X	1

Sheet D	1	2	3	4	5	6	7	8	Final
Hungary 🔨	0	1	0	3	2	0	3	X	9
Slovenia	1	0	1	0	0	2	0	X	4

Sheet E	1	2	3	4	5	6	7	8	Final
Luxembourg	0	0	0	0	2	0	X	X	2
Netherlands 🔨	2	2	2	3	0	3	X	X	12

Sheet F	1	2	3	4	5	6	7	8	9	Final
Guyana	1	0	2	1	1	0	0	1	0	6
Philippines 🔨	0	4	0	0	0	1	1	0	1	7

=== Draw 4 ===
Monday, January 5, 19:30

Sheet A	1	2	3	4	5	6	7	8	Final
Croatia	0	0	0	1	0	4	0	X	5
Hong Kong 🔨	1	1	1	0	2	0	2	X	7

Sheet B	1	2	3	4	5	6	7	8	Final
Austria 🔨	3	2	0	2	1	3	X	X	11
Thailand	0	0	1	0	0	0	X	X	1

Sheet C	1	2	3	4	5	6	7	8	Final
Puerto Rico	1	0	0	1	0	0	0	X	2
Mexico 🔨	0	2	3	0	2	2	1	X	10

Sheet D	1	2	3	4	5	6	7	8	Final
Belgium	0	0	2	0	3	0	0	X	5
Poland 🔨	2	2	0	4	0	4	2	X	14

Sheet E	1	2	3	4	5	6	7	8	Final
Jamaica 🔨	0	0	1	0	1	2	1	X	5
Chinese Taipei	2	2	0	4	0	0	0	X	8

Sheet F	1	2	3	4	5	6	7	8	Final
England	0	0	1	0	1	1	0	X	3
China 🔨	3	1	0	1	0	0	4	X	9

=== Draw 5 ===
Tuesday, January 6, 9:00

Sheet A	1	2	3	4	5	6	7	8	Final
Slovenia	1	2	0	0	1	1	0	2	7
Romania 🔨	0	0	1	4	0	0	1	0	6

Sheet B	1	2	3	4	5	6	7	8	Final
France	0	0	5	4	0	1	X	X	10
Guyana 🔨	3	1	0	0	1	0	X	X	5

Sheet C	1	2	3	4	5	6	7	8	Final
Portugal 🔨	1	0	1	1	0	2	0	0	5
Latvia	0	1	0	0	3	0	2	1	7

Sheet D	1	2	3	4	5	6	7	8	Final
Philippines	0	0	0	3	2	1	0	1	7
Spain 🔨	3	1	1	0	0	0	1	0	6

Sheet E	1	2	3	4	5	6	7	8	Final
Brazil	1	1	0	0	2	0	X	X	4
Hungary 🔨	0	0	4	3	0	4	X	X	11

Sheet F	1	2	3	4	5	6	7	8	Final
Ukraine	1	0	4	0	5	2	1	X	13
Nigeria 🔨	0	4	0	2	0	0	0	X	6

=== Draw 6 ===
Tuesday, January 6, 12:30

Sheet A	1	2	3	4	5	6	7	8	Final
Luxembourg 🔨	0	0	4	3	0	0	3	0	10
Lithuania	1	2	0	0	3	1	0	2	9

Sheet B	1	2	3	4	5	6	7	8	Final
Ireland	1	0	1	1	1	0	1	1	6
Slovakia 🔨	0	3	0	0	0	1	0	0	4

Sheet E	1	2	3	4	5	6	7	8	Final
India 🔨	5	1	1	1	1	4	X	X	13
Kenya	0	0	0	0	0	0	X	X	0

=== Draw 7 ===
Tuesday, January 6, 16:00

Sheet C	1	2	3	4	5	6	7	8	Final
Turkey	0	1	0	1	2	0	0	X	4
Austria 🔨	2	0	4	0	0	1	1	X	8

Sheet D	1	2	3	4	5	6	7	8	Final
Thailand	0	0	2	0	1	0	X	X	3
Chinese Taipei 🔨	3	2	0	4	0	3	X	X	12

Sheet F	1	2	3	4	5	6	7	8	Final
Jamaica 🔨	1	0	2	1	1	0	4	X	9
Croatia	0	1	0	0	0	3	0	X	4

=== Draw 8 ===
Tuesday, January 6, 19:30

Sheet A	1	2	3	4	5	6	7	8	Final
Slovakia	0	0	1	0	0	0	X	X	1
Netherlands 🔨	4	2	0	3	2	1	X	X	12

Sheet B	1	2	3	4	5	6	7	8	Final
Kenya	0	0	0	0	0	1	X	X	1
Luxembourg 🔨	3	2	1	4	1	0	X	X	11

Sheet C	1	2	3	4	5	6	7	8	Final
Poland	4	1	0	3	1	0	X	X	9
England 🔨	0	0	1	0	0	1	X	X	2

Sheet D	1	2	3	4	5	6	7	8	9	Final
Pakistan	0	1	0	1	0	3	0	1	0	6
Mexico 🔨	1	0	2	0	1	0	2	0	1	7

Sheet E	1	2	3	4	5	6	7	8	Final
Lithuania 🔨	0	3	2	1	0	1	1	0	8
Ireland	3	0	0	0	2	0	0	1	6

Sheet F	1	2	3	4	5	6	7	8	Final
Belgium	0	4	1	2	0	2	2	X	11
Puerto Rico 🔨	3	0	0	0	3	0	0	X	6

=== Draw 9 ===
Wednesday, January 7, 9:00

Sheet A	1	2	3	4	5	6	7	8	Final
Thailand	0	1	2	0	0	0	0	X	3
Turkey 🔨	3	0	0	2	2	1	1	X	9

Sheet B	1	2	3	4	5	6	7	8	Final
Chinese Taipei 🔨	2	3	1	3	1	1	X	X	11
Croatia	0	0	0	0	0	0	X	X	0

Sheet E	1	2	3	4	5	6	7	8	Final
Hong Kong 🔨	0	0	1	0	1	1	0	X	3
Austria	1	3	0	2	0	0	2	X	8

=== Draw 10 ===
Wednesday, January 7, 12:30

Sheet A	1	2	3	4	5	6	7	8	Final
Ireland	0	3	0	3	0	4	0	1	11
India 🔨	3	0	4	0	1	0	1	0	9

Sheet B	1	2	3	4	5	6	7	8	Final
Mexico 🔨	2	0	0	1	0	1	1		W
Belgium	0	4	1	0	1	0	0	/	L

Sheet C	1	2	3	4	5	6	7	8	Final
Kenya	0	0	0	0	0	0	X	X	0
Lithuania 🔨	4	5	2	1	4	3	X	X	19

Sheet D	1	2	3	4	5	6	7	8	Final
China 🔨	3	2	3	1	1	0	4	X	14
Puerto Rico	0	0	0	0	0	2	0	X	2

Sheet F	1	2	3	4	5	6	7	8	Final
Poland 🔨	2	0	0	1	1	0	3	X	7
Pakistan	0	1	1	0	0	3	0	X	5

- Belgium forfeited the game (ran out of time during end 8, 1 stone remaining)

=== Draw 11 ===
Wednesday, January 7, 16:00

Sheet A	1	2	3	4	5	6	7	8	Final
Guyana 🔨	5	0	1	0	1	1	0	X	8
Ukraine	0	1	0	1	0	0	1	X	3

Sheet B	1	2	3	4	5	6	7	8	Final
Nigeria	1	0	0	0	1	0	1	0	3
Spain 🔨	0	1	1	3	0	2	0	1	8

Sheet C	1	2	3	4	5	6	7	8	Final
Romania	0	3	1	2	0	1	0	1	8
Hungary 🔨	2	0	0	0	2	0	3	0	7

Sheet D	1	2	3	4	5	6	7	8	Final
Portugal 🔨	3	3	1	1	1	1	X	X	10
Brazil	0	0	0	0	0	0	X	X	0

Sheet E	1	2	3	4	5	6	7	8	Final
France 🔨	0	3	4	0	1	0	1	X	9
Philippines	1	0	0	1	0	1	0	X	3

Sheet F	1	2	3	4	5	6	7	8	Final
Latvia 🔨	3	1	1	1	0	1	0	X	7
Slovenia	0	0	0	0	1	0	1	X	2

=== Draw 12 ===
Wednesday, January 7, 19:30

Sheet A	1	2	3	4	5	6	7	8	9	Final
China	2	0	1	1	0	4	0	0	2	10
Mexico 🔨	0	3	0	0	3	0	1	1	0	8

Sheet B	1	2	3	4	5	6	7	8	Final
Puerto Rico	2	0	0	0	1	0	0	X	3
England 🔨	0	3	2	2	0	3	1	X	11

Sheet C	1	2	3	4	5	6	7	8	Final
Luxembourg 🔨	0	3	0	2	0	3	0	2	10
Slovakia	1	0	1	0	4	0	5	0	11

Sheet D	1	2	3	4	5	6	7	8	Final
Lithuania 🔨	2	1	0	1	0	3	0	X	7
India	0	0	1	0	1	0	1	X	3

Sheet E	1	2	3	4	5	6	7	8	Final
Belgium	0	1	0	0	1	0	3	X	5
Pakistan 🔨	1	0	2	3	0	1	0	X	7

Sheet F	1	2	3	4	5	6	7	8	Final
Netherlands 🔨	6	2	1	3	2	1	X	X	15
Kenya	0	0	0	0	0	0	X	X	0

=== Draw 13 ===
Thursday, January 8, 9:00

Sheet A	1	2	3	4	5	6	7	8	Final
Austria 🔨	3	1	2	0	3	0	X	X	9
Jamaica	0	0	0	2	0	1	X	X	3

Sheet C	1	2	3	4	5	6	7	8	Final
Chinese Taipei	1	0	1	2	1	0	2	X	7
Hong Kong 🔨	0	1	0	0	0	1	0	X	2

Sheet E	1	2	3	4	5	6	7	8	Final
Croatia 🔨	0	1	1	0	0	0	1	0	3
Turkey	1	0	0	1	1	3	0	1	7

=== Draw 14 ===
Thursday, January 8, 12:30

Sheet A	1	2	3	4	5	6	7	8	Final
England 🔨	1	0	0	3	0	3	1	X	8
Belgium	0	1	1	0	2	0	0	X	4

Sheet B	1	2	3	4	5	6	7	8	Final
India 🔨	0	0	0	0	0	1	X	X	1
Netherlands	1	1	2	2	3	0	X	X	9

Sheet C	1	2	3	4	5	6	7	8	Final
Pakistan	0	2	0	2	0	1	1	X	6
China 🔨	2	0	3	0	4	0	0	X	9

Sheet D	1	2	3	4	5	6	7	8	Final
Ireland	0	6	0	0	1	0	3	1	11
Luxembourg 🔨	3	0	1	1	0	1	0	0	6

Sheet E	1	2	3	4	5	6	7	8	Final
Puerto Rico	0	0	2	1	0	0	0	X	3
Poland 🔨	2	2	0	0	2	2	1	X	9

Sheet F	1	2	3	4	5	6	7	8	Final
Lithuania	0	0	1	0	2	0	0	X	3
Slovakia 🔨	1	2	0	1	0	1	1	X	6

=== Draw 15 ===
Thursday, January 8, 16:00

Sheet A	1	2	3	4	5	6	7	8	Final
Philippines 🔨	2	0	2	0	2	0	5	X	11
Nigeria	0	2	0	1	0	1	0	X	4

Sheet B	1	2	3	4	5	6	7	8	Final
Latvia 🔨	1	1	0	0	0	1	0	X	3
Hungary	0	0	1	3	1	0	3	X	8

Sheet C	1	2	3	4	5	6	7	8	Final
Spain 🔨	1	0	1	0	0	1	0	X	3
Guyana	0	3	0	5	1	0	1	X	10

Sheet D	1	2	3	4	5	6	7	8	Final
Ukraine	0	1	0	3	1	0	3	0	8
France 🔨	1	0	4	0	0	2	0	2	9

Sheet E	1	2	3	4	5	6	7	8	Final
Slovenia 🔨	4	1	0	0	2	0	0	1	8
Portugal	0	0	1	1	0	3	1	0	6

Sheet F	1	2	3	4	5	6	7	8	Final
Brazil	0	0	0	0	2	0	0	X	2
Romania 🔨	2	1	2	1	0	2	1	X	9

=== Draw 16 ===
Thursday, January 8, 19:30

Sheet C	1	2	3	4	5	6	7	8	Final
Croatia	0	5	1	1	1	0	0	X	8
Thailand 🔨	1	0	0	0	0	1	2	X	4

Sheet D	1	2	3	4	5	6	7	8	Final
Hong Kong	0	0	0	3	0	0	X	X	3
Jamaica 🔨	3	4	1	0	2	3	X	X	13

Sheet F	1	2	3	4	5	6	7	8	Final
Turkey	1	0	1	3	2	0	3	X	10
Chinese Taipei 🔨	0	1	0	0	0	1	0	X	2

=== Draw 17 ===
Friday, January 9, 10:00

Sheet A	1	2	3	4	5	6	7	8	Final
Hungary	1	0	3	2	0	4	X	X	10
Portugal 🔨	0	1	0	0	2	0	X	X	3

Sheet B	1	2	3	4	5	6	7	8	Final
Philippines 🔨	1	2	2	0	4	0	0	X	9
Ukraine	0	0	0	3	0	1	1	X	5

Sheet C	1	2	3	4	5	6	7	8	Final
Slovenia 🔨	2	2	2	1	2	1	X	X	10
Brazil	0	0	0	0	0	0	X	X	0

Sheet D	1	2	3	4	5	6	7	8	Final
Romania	0	1	1	0	2	1	0	X	5
Latvia 🔨	3	0	0	3	0	0	2	X	8

Sheet E	1	2	3	4	5	6	7	8	Final
Nigeria	0	0	0	0	0	0	X	X	0
Guyana 🔨	1	1	2	4	2	1	X	X	11

Sheet F	1	2	3	4	5	6	7	8	Final
Spain	0	1	3	0	2	0	0	0	6
France 🔨	5	0	0	1	0	1	1	2	10

=== Draw 18 ===
Friday, January 9, 14:00

Sheet B	1	2	3	4	5	6	7	8	Final
Jamaica 🔨	0	3	0	1	1	1	0	2	8
Turkey	1	0	3	0	0	0	3	0	7

Sheet D	1	2	3	4	5	6	7	8	Final
Austria	1	2	3	2	0	1	2	X	11
Croatia 🔨	0	0	0	0	1	0	0	X	1

Sheet F	1	2	3	4	5	6	7	8	Final
Hong Kong 🔨	4	0	4	2	1	0	X	X	11
Thailand	0	2	0	0	0	1	X	X	3

=== Draw 19 ===
Friday, January 9, 18:00

Sheet A	1	2	3	4	5	6	7	8	Final
Pakistan 🔨	1	1	2	0	2	0	3	X	9
Puerto Rico	0	0	0	2	0	1	0	X	3

Sheet B	1	2	3	4	5	6	7	8	Final
Poland 🔨	1	0	0	1	0	1	0	0	3
China	0	1	2	0	1	0	1	1	6

Sheet C	1	2	3	4	5	6	7	8	Final
Netherlands	0	3	2	3	2	0	X	X	10
Ireland 🔨	1	0	0	0	0	1	X	X	2

Sheet D	1	2	3	4	5	6	7	8	Final
Slovakia 🔨	4	4	1	2	3	4	X	X	18
Kenya	0	0	0	0	0	0	X	X	0

Sheet E	1	2	3	4	5	6	7	8	Final
Mexico	0	1	0	0	1	0	2	X	4
England 🔨	4	0	1	1	0	2	0	X	8

Sheet F	1	2	3	4	5	6	7	8	Final
India	2	2	6	0	3	0	3	X	16
Luxembourg 🔨	0	0	0	1	0	2	0	X	3

== Playoffs ==
Qualification Semifinals
8	Poland	10
9	Philippines	3
7	Latvia	6
10	Ireland	5
6	Austria	10
11	Jamaica	4
5	Chinese Taipei	7
12	England	5

Qualification Finals
1	Netherlands	10
8	Poland	4
2	Hungary	9
7	Latvia	5
3	France	9
6	Austria	4
4	China	7
5	Chinese Taipei	5

=== Qualification Semifinals ===
Saturday, January 10, 10:00

Sheet B	1	2	3	4	5	6	7	8	Final
Poland	3	2	0	0	4	1	0	X	10
Philippines 🔨	0	0	1	1	0	0	1	X	3

Sheet C	1	2	3	4	5	6	7	8	Final
Chinese Taipei 🔨	2	1	1	0	1	0	2	0	7
England	0	0	0	1	0	2	0	2	5

Sheet D	1	2	3	4	5	6	7	8	Final
Austria 🔨	5	1	0	1	1	0	2	X	10
Jamaica	0	0	1	0	0	3	0	X	4

Sheet E	1	2	3	4	5	6	7	8	Final
Latvia 🔨	0	0	1	0	2	2	0	1	6
Ireland	1	1	0	1	0	0	2	0	5

=== Qualification Finals ===
Saturday, January 10, 15:00

Sheet B	1	2	3	4	5	6	7	8	Final
France 🔨	2	0	1	0	1	3	1	1	9
Austria	0	3	0	1	0	0	0	0	4

Sheet C	1	2	3	4	5	6	7	8	Final
Netherlands 🔨	2	0	0	2	3	0	3	X	10
Poland	0	2	1	0	0	1	0	X	4

Sheet D	1	2	3	4	5	6	7	8	Final
Hungary 🔨	0	3	0	2	0	0	4	0	9
Latvia	1	0	1	0	1	1	0	1	5

Sheet E	1	2	3	4	5	6	7	8	Final
China 🔨	1	0	2	0	1	3	0	X	7
Chinese Taipei	0	1	0	1	0	0	3	X	5
