= Veerle Geerinckx =

Belgian female curler

- Curler ♀
- Born: 3 March 1973 (age 53); Dendermonde

Team
- Curling club: CC Zemst
- Skip: Veerle Geerinckx
- Fourth: Kim Catteceur
- Second: Yana Meyhi
- Lead: Britt Meyhi
- Mixed doubles partner: Dirk Heylen

Curling career
- Member Association: Belgium
- World Mixed Doubles Championship: 1 (2019)
- European Championship: 3 (2021, 2022), 2023)
- Other appearances: World Mixed Championship: 1 (2019)

Veerle Geerinckx (born 3 March 1973 in Dendermonde) is a Belgian politician and curler.

Geerinckx became the first female mayor of Zemst in January 2019.

== Teams ==
=== Women's ===
| Season | Skip | Third | Second | Lead | Alternate | Coach | Events |
|---|---|---|---|---|---|---|---|
| 2021–22 | Danielle Berus (fourth) | Veerle Geerinckx | Kim Catteceur | Caro Van Oosterwyck (skip) | Annemiek Huiskamp | Dirk Heylen | ECC 2021 (22nd) |
| 2022–23 | Danielle Berus (fourth) | Veerle Geerinckx | Kim Catteceur | Caro Van Oosterwyck (skip) | Annemiek Huiskamp | Dirk Heylen | ECC 2022 (16th) |
| 2023–24 | Danielle Berus (fourth) | Caro Van Oosterwyck (skip) | Kim Catteceur | Annemiek Huiskamp | Veerle Geerinckx | Ester Romijn, Erik Dijkstra | ECC 2023 (19th) |

=== Mixed ===
| Season | Skip | Third | Second | Lead | Events |
|---|---|---|---|---|---|
| 2019–20 | Dirk Heylen (fourth) | Danielle Berus | Stephane Vandermeeren | Veerle Geerinckx (skip) | WMxCC 2019 (40th) |

=== Mixed doubles ===
| Season | Male | Female | Events |
|---|---|---|---|
| 2018–19 | Dirk Heylen | Veerle Geerinckx | WMDCC 2019 (40th) |
| 2019–20 | Dirk Heylen | Veerle Geerinckx | WMDQ 2019 (14th) |
| 2025–26 | Dirk Heylen | Veerle Geerinckx | WMDQ 2026 (TBD) |

== Personal life ==
She has four children.

She started curling in 2017.
