= 2023 European Curling Championships =

European curling tournament held in Scotland

2023 Le Gruyère AOP European Curling Championships
- Host city: Aberdeen, Scotland (A divisions); Perth, Scotland (B divisions); Dumfries, Scotland (C divisions)
- Arena: Curl Aberdeen (A divisions); Dewars Centre (B divisions); Dumfries Ice Bowl (C divisions)
- Dates: November 18–25 (A & B divisions); April 29 – May 6 (C division)
- Men's winner: Scotland
- Curling club: Gogar Park CC, Edinburgh
- Skip: Bruce Mouat
- Third: Grant Hardie
- Second: Bobby Lammie
- Lead: Hammy McMillan Jr.
- Alternate: Kyle Waddell
- Coach: Michael Goodfellow
- Finalist: Sweden (Edin)
- Women's winner: Switzerland
- Curling club: CC Aarau, Aarau
- Skip: Silvana Tirinzoni
- Fourth: Alina Pätz
- Second: Selina Witschonke
- Lead: Carole Howald
- Alternate: Stefanie Berset
- Coach: Pierre Charette
- Finalist: Italy (Constantini)

The 2023 Le Gruyère AOP European Curling Championships took place in May and November 2023, to qualify European curling teams for the 2024 World Curling Championships. The A and B division competitions were held from November 18 to 25, with the A division being held at Curl Aberdeen in Aberdeen, Scotland, and the B division being held at Dewars Centre in Perth, Scotland. The C division competition was held from April 29 to May 6 at the Dumfries Ice Bowl in Dumfries, Scotland.

The top eight men's and women's teams qualified for the 2024 World Men's Curling Championship and the 2024 World Women's Curling Championship respectively. Switzerland, the host of the men's world championship, automatically qualified as one of the eight European entrants.

== Medalists ==
A Division	Gold	Silver	Bronze
Men	Scotland; Bruce Mouat; Grant Hardie; Bobby Lammie; Hammy McMillan Jr. Kyle Waddell	Sweden; Niklas Edin; Oskar Eriksson; Rasmus Wranå; Christoffer Sundgren; Daniel Magnusson	Switzerland; Benoît Schwarz-van Berkel (Fourth); Yannick Schwaller (Skip); Sven Michel; Pablo Lachat; Kim Schwaller
Women	Switzerland; Alina Pätz (Fourth); Silvana Tirinzoni (Skip); Selina Witschonke; Carole Howald; Stefanie Berset	Italy; Stefania Constantini; Elena Mathis; Angela Romei; Giulia Zardini Lacedelli; Marta Lo Deserto	Norway; Kristin Skaslien (Fourth); Marianne Rørvik (Skip); Mille Haslev Nordbye; Martine Rønning; Ingeborg Forbregd

== Men ==
=== A division ===
==== Qualification ====
The following nations qualified to participate in the 2023 European Curling Championship:

Event	Vacancies	Qualified
2022 European Curling Championships A Division	8	Scotland; Switzerland; Italy; Sweden; Norway; Turkey; Czech Republic; Germany
2022 European Curling Championships B Division	2	Netherlands; Finland
TOTAL	10	

==== Teams ====
The teams are listed as follows:

Czech Republic	Finland	Germany	Italy	Netherlands
Skip: Lukáš Klíma; Third: Marek Černovský; Second: Martin Jurík; Lead: Lukáš Klípa; Alternate: Radek Boháč	Skip: Kalle Kiiskinen; Third: Teemu Salo; Second: Leo Ouni; Lead: Paavo Kuosmanen; Alternate: Jermu Pöllänen	Skip: Sixten Totzek; Third: Joshua Sutor; Second: Magnus Sutor; Lead: Jan-Luca Häg; Alternate: Benny Kapp	Skip: Joël Retornaz; Third: Amos Mosaner; Second: Sebastiano Arman; Lead: Mattia Giovanella; Alternate: Alberto Pimpini	Skip: Wouter Gösgens; Third: Laurens Hoekman; Second: Jaap van Dorp; Lead: Tobias van den Hurk; Alternate: Alexander Magan
Norway	Scotland	Sweden	Switzerland	Turkey
Skip: Magnus Ramsfjell; Third: Martin Sesaker; Second: Bendik Ramsfjell; Lead: Gaute Nepstad; Alternate: Willhelm Næss	Skip: Bruce Mouat; Third: Grant Hardie; Second: Bobby Lammie; Lead: Hammy McMillan Jr. Alternate: Kyle Waddell	Skip: Niklas Edin; Third: Oskar Eriksson; Second: Rasmus Wranå; Lead: Christoffer Sundgren; Alternate: Daniel Magnusson	Fourth: Benoît Schwarz-van Berkel; Skip: Yannick Schwaller; Second: Sven Michel; Lead: Pablo Lachat; Alternate: Kim Schwaller	Skip: Uğurcan Karagöz; Third: Muhammet Haydar Demirel; Second: Muhammed Zeki Uçan; Lead: Orhun Yüce; Alternate: Faruk Kavaz

==== Round robin standings ====
Final Round Robin Standings

Key
Teams to Playoffs and Qualified for the 2024 World Men's Curling Championship
Teams Qualified for the 2024 World Men's Curling Championship
Teams Relegated to 2024 B Division

Country	Skip	W	L	W–L	PF	PA	EW	EL	BE	SE	S%	DSC
Italy	Joël Retornaz	9	0	–	85	38	40	24	3	11	90.1%	19.36
Scotland	Bruce Mouat	7	2	–	66	45	38	32	5	7	88.7%	30.86
Switzerland	Yannick Schwaller	6	3	1–1	63	52	41	33	8	12	83.6%	16.65
Sweden	Niklas Edin	6	3	1–1	70	46	40	34	1	9	87.4%	18.58
Norway	Magnus Ramsfjell	6	3	1–1	61	52	43	32	6	14	84.2%	42.36
Germany	Sixten Totzek	4	5	–	49	62	28	37	5	7	82.0%	79.13
Netherlands	Wouter Gösgens	3	6	–	52	69	34	42	4	5	82.7%	28.56
Czech Republic	Lukáš Klíma	2	7	–	48	70	34	44	3	7	76.9%	36.52
Turkey	Uğurcan Karagöz	1	8	1–0	42	76	30	42	2	3	73.1%	44.74
Finland	Kalle Kiiskinen	1	8	0–1	43	69	35	43	1	11	75.9%	45.90

Round Robin Summary Table
Pos.	Country	Czech Republic	Finland	Germany	Italy	Netherlands	Norway	Scotland	Sweden	Switzerland	Turkey	Record
8	Czech Republic	—	5–8	4–9	1–8	7–10	5–9	5–6	7–6	7–10	7–4	2–7
10	Finland	8–5	—	5–7	2–10	3–10	3–6	7–8	3–8	5–7	7–8	1–8
6	Germany	9–4	7–5	—	4–10	8–4	3–7	2–8	4–9	4–8	8–7	4–5
1	Italy	8–1	10–2	10–4	—	10–1	12–7	7–6	7–5	11–8	10–4	9–0
7	Netherlands	10–7	10–3	4–8	1–10	—	5–7	4–9	7–11	4–8	7–6	3–6
5	Norway	9–5	6–3	7–3	7–12	7–5	—	3–5	5–10	6–4	11–5	6–3
2	Scotland	6–5	8–7	8–2	6–7	9–4	5–3	—	5–8	9–6	10–3	7–2
4	Sweden	6–7	8–3	9–4	5–7	11–7	10–5	8–5	—	3–6	10–2	6–3
3	Switzerland	10–7	7–5	8–4	8–11	8–4	4–6	6–9	6–3	—	6–3	6–3
9	Turkey	4–7	8–7	7–8	4–10	6–7	5–11	3–10	2–10	3–6	—	1–8

==== Round robin results ====
All draw times are listed in Greenwich Mean Time (UTC+00:00).

===== Draw 1 =====
Saturday, November 18, 14:30

Sheet A	1	2	3	4	5	6	7	8	9	10	Final
Turkey (Karagöz)	0	0	0	1	0	2	0	0	0	X	3
Switzerland (Schwaller) 🔨	0	1	1	0	3	0	0	0	1	X	6

Sheet B	1	2	3	4	5	6	7	8	9	10	Final
Scotland (Mouat) 🔨	1	0	2	0	0	0	0	2	0	0	5
Norway (Ramsfjell)	0	1	0	1	0	0	0	0	0	1	3

Sheet C	1	2	3	4	5	6	7	8	9	10	Final
Sweden (Edin) 🔨	2	0	1	0	1	0	0	0	2	0	6
Czech Republic (Klíma)	0	1	0	1	0	0	2	2	0	1	7

Sheet D	1	2	3	4	5	6	7	8	9	10	Final
Italy (Retornaz) 🔨	1	2	1	2	0	4	X	X	X	X	10
Netherlands (Gösgens)	0	0	0	0	1	0	X	X	X	X	1

Sheet E	1	2	3	4	5	6	7	8	9	10	Final
Finland (Kiiskinen) 🔨	0	1	0	0	0	1	0	2	1	0	5
Germany (Totzek)	1	0	0	0	3	0	1	0	0	2	7

===== Draw 2 =====
Sunday, November 19, 9:00

Sheet A	1	2	3	4	5	6	7	8	9	10	Final
Norway (Ramsfjell) 🔨	2	0	1	1	0	1	0	2	0	X	7
Italy (Retornaz)	0	4	0	0	3	0	2	0	3	X	12

Sheet B	1	2	3	4	5	6	7	8	9	10	Final
Switzerland (Schwaller) 🔨	2	0	0	2	1	0	2	0	1	X	8
Netherlands (Gösgens)	0	0	1	0	0	1	0	2	0	X	4

Sheet C	1	2	3	4	5	6	7	8	9	10	Final
Finland (Kiiskinen)	0	1	2	0	0	1	0	1	1	1	7
Turkey (Karagöz) 🔨	1	0	0	2	3	0	2	0	0	0	8

Sheet D	1	2	3	4	5	6	7	8	9	10	Final
Germany (Totzek)	0	1	0	3	4	1	0	0	X	X	9
Czech Republic (Klíma) 🔨	1	0	2	0	0	0	0	1	X	X	4

Sheet E	1	2	3	4	5	6	7	8	9	10	Final
Scotland (Mouat)	0	2	0	1	1	0	1	0	0	X	5
Sweden (Edin) 🔨	4	0	1	0	0	1	0	1	1	X	8

===== Draw 3 =====
Sunday, November 19, 19:00

Sheet A	1	2	3	4	5	6	7	8	9	10	Final
Czech Republic (Klíma) 🔨	2	0	1	0	1	0	0	0	1	0	5
Scotland (Mouat)	0	1	0	1	0	2	0	1	0	1	6

Sheet B	1	2	3	4	5	6	7	8	9	10	11	Final
Turkey (Karagöz) 🔨	1	0	0	3	0	0	1	0	1	1	0	7
Germany (Totzek)	0	2	2	0	0	1	0	2	0	0	1	8

Sheet C	1	2	3	4	5	6	7	8	9	10	Final
Switzerland (Schwaller) 🔨	3	0	1	0	0	0	3	0	1	0	8
Italy (Retornaz)	0	3	0	2	1	1	0	2	0	2	11

Sheet D	1	2	3	4	5	6	7	8	9	10	Final
Sweden (Edin)	1	0	3	1	0	2	1	X	X	X	8
Finland (Kiiskinen) 🔨	0	1	0	0	2	0	0	X	X	X	3

Sheet E	1	2	3	4	5	6	7	8	9	10	Final
Norway (Ramsfjell) 🔨	0	0	2	0	3	0	0	1	0	1	7
Netherlands (Gösgens)	0	1	0	2	0	1	0	0	1	0	5

===== Draw 4 =====
Monday, November 20, 12:00

Sheet A	1	2	3	4	5	6	7	8	9	10	Final
Netherlands (Gösgens) 🔨	1	0	1	0	2	0	1	2	3	X	10
Finland (Kiiskinen)	0	1	0	1	0	1	0	0	0	X	3

Sheet B	1	2	3	4	5	6	7	8	9	10	Final
Sweden (Edin) 🔨	0	2	0	1	0	2	0	0	0	X	5
Italy (Retornaz)	0	0	2	0	2	0	0	1	2	X	7

Sheet C	1	2	3	4	5	6	7	8	9	10	Final
Germany (Totzek)	0	0	0	0	2	0	1	0	0	0	3
Norway (Ramsfjell) 🔨	0	0	1	0	0	2	0	1	1	2	7

Sheet D	1	2	3	4	5	6	7	8	9	10	Final
Czech Republic (Klíma) 🔨	0	1	0	2	0	2	0	0	2	X	7
Turkey (Karagöz)	1	0	1	0	1	0	0	1	0	X	4

Sheet E	1	2	3	4	5	6	7	8	9	10	Final
Switzerland (Schwaller)	0	3	0	1	0	1	0	1	0	X	6
Scotland (Mouat) 🔨	1	0	2	0	3	0	2	0	1	X	9

===== Draw 5 =====
Monday, November 20, 20:00

Sheet A	1	2	3	4	5	6	7	8	9	10	Final
Sweden (Edin) 🔨	0	2	0	1	0	2	0	4	1	X	10
Norway (Ramsfjell)	1	0	2	0	1	0	1	0	0	X	5

Sheet B	1	2	3	4	5	6	7	8	9	10	Final
Finland (Kiiskinen)	0	0	1	0	0	3	0	0	1	0	5
Switzerland (Schwaller) 🔨	2	1	0	2	1	0	0	0	0	1	7

Sheet C	1	2	3	4	5	6	7	8	9	10	11	Final
Turkey (Karagöz) 🔨	1	0	1	0	1	0	2	0	1	0	0	6
Netherlands (Gösgens)	0	1	0	1	0	1	0	1	0	2	1	7

Sheet D	1	2	3	4	5	6	7	8	9	10	Final
Scotland (Mouat) 🔨	2	0	2	2	0	2	X	X	X	X	8
Germany (Totzek)	0	1	0	0	1	0	X	X	X	X	2

Sheet E	1	2	3	4	5	6	7	8	9	10	Final
Italy (Retornaz) 🔨	2	1	0	1	3	1	X	X	X	X	8
Czech Republic (Klíma)	0	0	1	0	0	0	X	X	X	X	1

===== Draw 6 =====
Tuesday, November 21, 14:00

Sheet A	1	2	3	4	5	6	7	8	9	10	Final
Finland (Kiiskinen)	1	0	0	2	2	0	1	1	0	1	8
Czech Republic (Klíma) 🔨	0	1	1	0	0	2	0	0	1	0	5

Sheet B	1	2	3	4	5	6	7	8	9	10	Final
Norway (Ramsfjell) 🔨	2	1	0	3	0	2	0	1	2	X	11
Turkey (Karagöz)	0	0	1	0	2	0	2	0	0	X	5

Sheet C	1	2	3	4	5	6	7	8	9	10	Final
Italy (Retornaz) 🔨	2	0	0	1	0	2	0	0	0	2	7
Scotland (Mouat)	0	0	3	0	1	0	0	2	0	0	6

Sheet D	1	2	3	4	5	6	7	8	9	10	Final
Netherlands (Gösgens) 🔨	0	0	1	0	2	0	3	0	1	0	7
Sweden (Edin)	2	1	0	1	0	3	0	1	0	3	11

Sheet E	1	2	3	4	5	6	7	8	9	10	Final
Germany (Totzek)	0	0	0	0	4	0	0	0	0	X	4
Switzerland (Schwaller) 🔨	0	0	0	2	0	2	2	2	0	X	8

===== Draw 7 =====
Wednesday, November 22, 9:00

Sheet A	1	2	3	4	5	6	7	8	9	10	Final
Scotland (Mouat)	0	2	0	2	1	3	0	1	X	X	9
Netherlands (Gösgens) 🔨	2	0	0	0	0	0	2	0	X	X	4

Sheet B	1	2	3	4	5	6	7	8	9	10	Final
Germany (Totzek)	0	0	1	0	2	0	1	0	0	X	4
Sweden (Edin) 🔨	1	2	0	2	0	1	0	2	1	X	9

Sheet C	1	2	3	4	5	6	7	8	9	10	Final
Czech Republic (Klíma)	1	0	1	3	0	2	0	0	0	0	7
Switzerland (Schwaller) 🔨	0	2	0	0	3	0	2	1	1	1	10

Sheet D	1	2	3	4	5	6	7	8	9	10	Final
Finland (Kiiskinen) 🔨	0	0	0	1	1	0	1	0	0	0	3
Norway (Ramsfjell)	0	1	1	0	0	1	0	1	1	1	6

Sheet E	1	2	3	4	5	6	7	8	9	10	Final
Turkey (Karagöz)	0	1	0	1	0	2	0	X	X	X	4
Italy (Retornaz) 🔨	3	0	3	0	2	0	2	X	X	X	10

===== Draw 8 =====
Wednesday, November 22, 19:00

Sheet A	1	2	3	4	5	6	7	8	9	10	Final
Switzerland (Schwaller) 🔨	1	1	0	1	0	1	1	1	0	X	6
Sweden (Edin)	0	0	1	0	1	0	0	0	1	X	3

Sheet B	1	2	3	4	5	6	7	8	9	10	Final
Italy (Retornaz) 🔨	2	4	0	3	0	1	X	X	X	X	10
Finland (Kiiskinen)	0	0	1	0	1	0	X	X	X	X	2

Sheet C	1	2	3	4	5	6	7	8	9	10	Final
Netherlands (Gösgens) 🔨	0	0	2	0	0	0	2	0	0	X	4
Germany (Totzek)	0	0	0	2	1	2	0	2	1	X	8

Sheet D	1	2	3	4	5	6	7	8	9	10	Final
Turkey (Karagöz)	0	0	2	0	1	0	X	X	X	X	3
Scotland (Mouat) 🔨	2	3	0	3	0	2	X	X	X	X	10

Sheet E	1	2	3	4	5	6	7	8	9	10	Final
Czech Republic (Klíma)	1	0	1	0	1	1	1	0	0	X	5
Norway (Ramsfjell) 🔨	0	1	0	2	0	0	0	2	4	X	9

===== Draw 9 =====
Thursday, November 23, 14:00

Sheet A	1	2	3	4	5	6	7	8	9	10	Final
Italy (Retornaz) 🔨	2	0	3	2	0	0	3	X	X	X	10
Germany (Totzek)	0	2	0	0	2	0	0	X	X	X	4

Sheet B	1	2	3	4	5	6	7	8	9	10	Final
Netherlands (Gösgens) 🔨	3	1	0	2	0	2	0	1	0	1	10
Czech Republic (Klíma)	0	0	1	0	2	0	3	0	1	0	7

Sheet C	1	2	3	4	5	6	7	8	9	10	11	Final
Scotland (Mouat) 🔨	0	1	0	2	0	2	0	0	2	0	1	8
Finland (Kiiskinen)	1	0	1	0	2	0	1	1	0	1	0	7

Sheet D	1	2	3	4	5	6	7	8	9	10	Final
Norway (Ramsfjell)	1	0	0	1	0	1	1	0	1	1	6
Switzerland (Schwaller) 🔨	0	2	0	0	1	0	0	1	0	0	4

Sheet E	1	2	3	4	5	6	7	8	9	10	Final
Sweden (Edin) 🔨	4	0	3	0	3	0	X	X	X	X	10
Turkey (Karagöz)	0	1	0	1	0	0	X	X	X	X	2

==== Playoffs ====
Semifinals
1	Italy	6
4	Sweden	7
2	Scotland	7
3	Switzerland	4

Gold medal game
4	Sweden	5
2	Scotland	6
Bronze medal game
1	Italy	4
3	Switzerland	8

===== Semifinals =====
Friday, November 24, 9:00

Sheet B	1	2	3	4	5	6	7	8	9	10	Final
Scotland (Mouat) 🔨	1	0	2	0	0	0	0	3	0	1	7
Switzerland (Schwaller)	0	1	0	0	0	1	0	0	2	0	4

Player percentages
Scotland		Switzerland	
Hammy McMillan Jr.	86%	Pablo Lachat	90%
Bobby Lammie	82%	Sven Michel	86%
Grant Hardie	86%	Yannick Schwaller	78%
Bruce Mouat	89%	Benoît Schwarz-van Berkel	89%
Total	86%	Total	86%

Sheet D	1	2	3	4	5	6	7	8	9	10	Final
Italy (Retornaz) 🔨	2	0	2	0	0	0	1	0	1	0	6
Sweden (Edin)	0	2	0	1	0	1	0	2	0	1	7

Player percentages
Italy		Sweden	
Mattia Giovanella	79%	Christoffer Sundgren	89%
Sebastiano Arman	90%	Rasmus Wranå	84%
Amos Mosaner	93%	Oskar Eriksson	89%
Joël Retornaz	80%	Niklas Edin	88%
Total	85%	Total	87%

===== Bronze medal game =====
Friday, November 24, 19:00

Sheet C	1	2	3	4	5	6	7	8	9	10	11	Final
Italy (Retornaz) 🔨	0	0	1	0	0	0	2	0	0	1	0	4
Switzerland (Schwaller)	0	0	0	2	0	1	0	1	0	0	4	8

Player percentages
Italy		Switzerland	
Mattia Giovanella	92%	Pablo Lachat	86%
Sebastiano Arman	81%	Sven Michel	94%
Amos Mosaner	90%	Yannick Schwaller	90%
Joël Retornaz	71%	Benoît Schwarz-van Berkel	80%
Total	84%	Total	88%

===== Gold medal game =====
Saturday, November 25, 14:00

Sheet C	1	2	3	4	5	6	7	8	9	10	11	Final
Sweden (Edin)	0	2	0	1	0	0	0	1	0	1	0	5
Scotland (Mouat) 🔨	2	0	1	0	0	1	0	0	1	0	1	6

Player percentages
Sweden		Scotland	
Christoffer Sundgren	91%	Hammy McMillan Jr.	95%
Rasmus Wranå	84%	Bobby Lammie	86%
Oskar Eriksson	92%	Grant Hardie	78%
Niklas Edin	88%	Bruce Mouat	93%
Total	89%	Total	88%

==== Player percentages ====
Round robin only

Leads	%
(Italy) Mattia Giovanella	94.1
(Scotland) Hammy McMillan Jr.	93.5
(Sweden) Christoffer Sundgren	92.0
(Norway) Gaute Nepstad	91.9
(Germany) Jan-Luca Häg	89.2

Seconds	%
(Italy) Sebastiano Arman	89.6
(Scotland) Bobby Lammie	88.6
(Sweden) Rasmus Wranå	86.6
(Switzerland) Sven Michel	85.3
(Netherlands) Jaap van Dorp	84.3

Thirds	%
(Italy) Amos Mosaner	89.3
(Sweden) Oskar Eriksson	87.8
(Scotland) Grant Hardie	87.5
(Switzerland) Yannick Schwaller (Skip)	82.2
(Norway) Martin Sesaker	82.0

Skips	%
(Italy) Joël Retornaz	87.2
(Scotland) Bruce Mouat	85.0
(Sweden) Niklas Edin	82.9
(Switzerland) Benoît Schwarz-van Berkel (Fourth)	79.9
(Norway) Magnus Ramsfjell	78.8

==== Final standings ====
Key
Teams Advance to the 2024 World Men's Curling Championship
Teams Relegated to 2024 B Division

Place	Team
1st place, gold medalist(s)	Scotland
2nd place, silver medalist(s)	Sweden
3rd place, bronze medalist(s)	Switzerland
4	Italy
5	Norway
6	Germany
7	Netherlands
8	Czech Republic
9	Turkey
10	Finland

=== B division ===
==== Teams ====
The teams are listed as follows:

Austria	Belgium	Denmark	England
Skip: Mathias Genner; Third: Jonas Backofen; Second: Martin Reichel; Lead: Florian Mavec; Alternate: Mortiz Jöchl	Skip: Tim Verrycken; Third: Jeroen Spruyt; Second: Tuur Vermeiren; Lead: Daan Yskout; Alternate: Dirk Heylen	Skip: Mikkel Krause; Third: Mads Nørgaard; Second: Henrik Holtermann; Lead: Oliver Søe; Alternate: Christian Karger	Skip: Rob Retchless; Third: Jotham Sugden; Second: Scott Gibson; Lead: Johnathan Havercroft; Alternate: Felix Price
Estonia	France	Hungary	Ireland
Skip: Eduard Veltsman; Third: Janis Kiziridi; Second: Konstantin Dotsenko; Lead: Igor Dzendzeljuk; Alternate: Aleksander Andre	Fourth: Quentin Morard; Skip: Eddy Mercier; Third: Yannick Valvassori; Lead: Killian Gaudin	Fourth: Zsolt Kiss; Skip: Kristóf Czermann; Second: Dávid Balázs; Lead: Milán Tüske; Alternate: Ottó Kalocsay	Skip: John Wilson; Third: Kyle Paradis; Second: James Russell; Lead: Craig Whyte; Alternate: Eoin McCrossan
Latvia	Liechtenstein	Poland	Portugal
Skip: Mārtiņs Trukšāns; Third: Jānis Klīve; Second: Aivars Avotiņš; Lead: Sandris Buholcs	Skip: Lukas Matt; Third: Harald Sprenger; Second: Johannes Zimmermann; Lead: Peter Prasch; Alternate: Mauro Liesch	Skip: Konrad Stych; Third: Krzysztof Domin; Second: Marcin Ciemiński; Lead: Bartosz Łobaza	Skip: Chris Ribau; Third: Ramiro Santos; Second: Allan Chaves; Lead: Vitor Santos; Alternate: Tim Schols
Slovakia	Spain	Ukraine	Wales
Fourth: Jakub Polák; Skip: Juraj Gallo; Second: Tomáš Pitoňák; Lead: Róbert Masaryk; Alternate: Ján Horáček	Skip: Gontzal García Vez; Third: Javier Munte; Second: Angel García; Lead: Victor Mirete; Alternate: Manuel García Roman	Skip: Eduard Nikolov; Third: Yaroslav Shchur; Second: Artem Suhak; Lead: Vladyslav Koval; Alternate: Artem Hasynets	Skip: James Pougher; Third: Rhys Phillips; Second: Gary Coombs; Lead: Simon Pougher; Alternate: Martin Lloyd

Group A	Skip	W	L	W–L	DSC
Latvia	Mārtiņs Trukšāns	5	2	2–1; 1–0	64.03
France	Eddy Mercier	5	2	2–1; 0–1	88.47
Belgium	Tim Verreycken	5	2	1–2; 1–0	75.28
Denmark	Mikkel Krause	5	2	1–2; 0–1	60.03
Poland	Konrad Stych	4	3	–	36.32
Hungary	Kristóf Czermann	2	5	1–0	82.91
Estonia	Eduard Veltsman	2	5	0–1	89.51
Portugal	Chris Ribau	0	7	–	126.78

Group B	Skip	W	L	W–L	DSC
England	Rob Retchless	6	1	–	83.78
Austria	Mathias Genner	5	2	1–0	66.13
Spain	Gontzal García Vez	5	2	0–1	66.02
Slovakia	Juraj Gallo	4	3	–	87.71
Ukraine	Eduard Nikolov	3	4	1–0	63.13
Wales	James Pougher	3	4	0–1	63.83
Ireland	John Wilson	2	5	–	78.70
Liechtenstein	Lukas Matt	0	7	–	111.70

Group A Round Robin Summary Table
Pos.	Country	Belgium	Denmark	Estonia	France	Hungary	Latvia	Poland	Portugal	Record
3	Belgium	—	7–1	10–5	2–7	10–3	6–8	7–2	8–6	5–2
4	Denmark	1–7	—	9–5	7–8	6–5	11–4	8–2	8–4	5–2
7	Estonia	5–10	5–9	—	5–9	4–10	7–3	3–9	13–9	2–5
2	France	7–2	8–7	9–5	—	10–7	7–8	4–6	10–3	5–2
6	Hungary	3–10	5–6	10–4	7–10	—	7–13	3–8	10–2	2–5
1	Latvia	8–6	4–11	3–7	8–7	13–7	—	6–5	11–3	5–2
5	Poland	3–7	2–8	9–3	6–4	8–3	5–6	—	10–4	4–3
8	Portugal	6–8	4–8	9–13	3–10	2–10	3–11	4–10	—	0–7

Group B Round Robin Summary Table
Pos.	Country	Austria	England		Liechtenstein	Slovakia	Spain	Ukraine	Wales	Record
2	Austria	—	11–3	9–7	14–4	5–7	10–4	6–8	8–6	5–2
1	England	3–11	—	9–8	11–1	8–4	10–3	10–2	11–2	6–1
7	Ireland	7–9	8–9	—	10–3	4–6	6–9	8–4	6–7	2–5
8	Liechtenstein	4–14	1–11	3–10	—	5–11	1–10	3–17	3–13	0–7
4	Slovakia	7–5	4–8	6–4	11–5	—	6–7	11–3	2–8	4–3
3	Spain	4–10	3–10	9–6	10–1	7–6	—	9–6	10–7	5–2
5	Ukraine	8–6	2–10	4–8	17–3	3–11	6–9	—	15–6	3–4
6	Wales	6–8	2–11	7–6	13–3	8–2	7–10	6–15	—	3–4

==== Relegation round ====
Relegation 1
A7	Estonia	8
B7	Ireland	4
A8	Portugal	10
B8	Liechtenstein	8

Relegation 2
B7	Ireland	10
A8	Portugal	5

Remain in B Division
Estonia
Ireland
Relegated to C Division
Portugal
Liechtenstein

===== Relegation 1 =====
Friday, November 24, 10:00

Sheet B	1	2	3	4	5	6	7	8	9	10	Final
Estonia (Veltsman) 🔨	1	0	0	2	0	1	2	0	2	X	8
Ireland (Wilson)	0	0	1	0	1	0	0	2	0	X	4

Sheet E	1	2	3	4	5	6	7	8	9	10	Final
Portugal (Ribau) 🔨	2	2	0	1	0	2	0	2	0	1	10
Liechtenstein (Matt)	0	0	3	0	2	0	2	0	1	0	8

===== Relegation 2 =====
Friday, November 24, 18:00

Sheet C	1	2	3	4	5	6	7	8	9	10	Final
Ireland (Wilson) 🔨	0	2	3	2	0	1	0	0	2	X	10
Portugal (Ribau)	0	0	0	0	2	0	2	1	0	X	5

==== Playoffs ====
Qualification games
B2	Austria	9
A3	Belgium	3
A2	France	9
B3	Spain	4

Semifinals
A1	Latvia	4
B2	Austria	6
B1	England	7
A2	France	3

Gold medal game
B2	Austria	4
B1	England	6
Bronze medal game
A1	Latvia	12
A2	France	6

===== Qualification games =====
Friday, November 24, 10:00

Sheet A	1	2	3	4	5	6	7	8	9	10	Final
Austria (Genner) 🔨	1	0	0	0	0	4	1	0	3	X	9
Belgium (Verreycken)	0	2	0	0	0	0	0	1	0	X	3

Sheet F	1	2	3	4	5	6	7	8	9	10	Final
France (Mercier) 🔨	2	0	0	2	1	0	1	0	3	X	9
Spain (García Vez)	0	0	1	0	0	2	0	1	0	X	4

===== Semifinals =====
Friday, November 24, 18:00

Sheet B	1	2	3	4	5	6	7	8	9	10	Final
Latvia (Trukšāns) 🔨	0	0	1	1	0	1	0	1	0	0	4
Austria (Genner)	0	1	0	0	0	0	1	0	1	3	6

Sheet D	1	2	3	4	5	6	7	8	9	10	Final
England (Retchless) 🔨	0	1	1	0	0	0	3	0	2	X	7
France (Mercier)	0	0	0	1	1	0	0	1	0	X	3

===== Bronze medal game =====
Saturday, November 25, 10:00

Sheet D	1	2	3	4	5	6	7	8	9	10	Final
Latvia (Trukšāns) 🔨	2	1	2	0	2	0	3	0	2	X	12
France (Mercier)	0	0	0	2	0	3	0	1	0	X	6

===== Gold medal game =====
Saturday, November 25, 14:00

Sheet D	1	2	3	4	5	6	7	8	9	10	Final
Austria (Genner)	0	0	0	1	1	0	2	0	0	0	4
England (Retchless) 🔨	0	1	1	0	0	1	0	1	1	1	6

==== Final standings ====
Key
Teams Qualify for 2024 A Division
Teams Relegated to 2024 C Division

Place	Team
1st place, gold medalist(s)	England
2nd place, silver medalist(s)	Austria
3rd place, bronze medalist(s)	Latvia
4	France
5	Belgium
5	Spain
7	Denmark
8	Slovakia
9	Poland
10	Ukraine
11	Wales
12	Hungary
13	Estonia
14	Ireland
15	Portugal
16	Liechtenstein

=== C division ===
==== Teams ====
The teams are listed as follows:

Andorra	Croatia	Georgia	Greece
Skip: Josep Garcia; Third: César Mialdea; Lead: Valentín Ortiz	Skip: Alberto Skendrović; Third: Bojan Gabrić; Second: Davor Džepina; Lead: Sasa Vidmar; Alternate: Hrvoje Tolić	Skip: Giorgi Jeiranashvili; Third: Davit Minasiani; Second: Kakha Ambrolava; Lead: Gocha Jeiranashvili	Skip: Alexandros Arampatzis; Third: Dionysios Karakostas; Second: Efstrantios Kokkinellis; Lead: Georgios Vakirtzis; Alternate: Nikolaos Zacharias
Liechtenstein	Poland	Slovenia	Ukraine
Skip: Lukas Matt; Third: Harald Sprenger; Second: Johannes Zimmermann; Lead: Peter Prasch; Alternate: Mauro Liesch	Skip: Konrad Stych; Third: Krzysztof Domin; Second: Marcin Ciemiński; Lead: Bartosz Łobaza	Skip: Gaber Bor Zelinka; Third: Simon Langus; Second: Tomas Tišler; Lead: Jakob Omerzel; Alternate: Noel Gregori	Skip: Eduard Nikolov; Third: Yaroslav Shchur; Second: Artem Suhak; Lead: Vladyslav Koval; Alternate: Artem Hasynets

Round Robin Summary Table
Pos.	Country	Andorra	Croatia	Georgia	Greece	Liechtenstein	Poland	Slovenia	Ukraine	Record
5	Andorra	—	9–5	11–3	6–5	8–9	2–8	7–10	5–8	3–4
6	Croatia	5–9	—	9–4	7–6	4–6	1–11	3–10	2–7	2–5
8	Georgia	3–11	4–9	—	3–10	5–9	0–16	0–18	4–17	0–7
7	Greece	5–6	6–7	10–3	—	6–11	1–11	4–8	5–11	1–6
4	Liechtenstein	9–8	6–4	9–5	11–6	—	4–7	3–6	0–14	4–3
1	Poland	8–2	11–1	16–0	11–1	7–4	—	7–5	8–2	7–0
3	Slovenia	10–7	10–3	18–0	8–4	6–3	5–7	—	7–9	5–2
2	Ukraine	8–5	7–2	17–4	11–5	14–0	2–8	9–7	—	6–1

==== Playoffs ====
Semifinals
1	Poland	4
4	Liechtenstein	5
2	Ukraine	6
3	Slovenia	4

Gold medal game
4	Liechtenstein	2
2	Ukraine	10
Bronze medal game
1	Poland	8
3	Slovenia	4

===== Semifinals =====
Thursday, May 4, 9:00

Sheet B	1	2	3	4	5	6	7	8	Final
Poland (Stych) 🔨	0	1	0	1	2	0	0	0	4
Liechtenstein (Matt)	0	0	2	0	0	2	0	1	5

Sheet D	1	2	3	4	5	6	7	8	Final
Ukraine (Nikolov) 🔨	2	0	0	2	0	0	1	1	6
Slovenia (Zelinka)	0	0	2	0	0	2	0	0	4

===== Bronze medal game =====
Thursday, May 4, 14:30

Sheet A	1	2	3	4	5	6	7	8	Final
Poland (Stych) 🔨	4	0	1	0	0	0	3	X	8
Slovenia (Zelinka)	0	0	0	1	2	1	0	X	4

===== Gold medal game =====
Thursday, May 4, 14:30

Sheet C	1	2	3	4	5	6	7	8	Final
Liechtenstein (Matt)	0	0	0	0	2	0	X	X	2
Ukraine (Nikolov) 🔨	2	4	0	3	0	1	X	X	10

==== Final standings ====
Key
Promoted to 2023 B division

Place	Team
1st place, gold medalist(s)	Ukraine
2nd place, silver medalist(s)	Liechtenstein
3rd place, bronze medalist(s)	Poland
4	Slovenia
5	Andorra
6	Croatia
7	Greece
8	Georgia

== Women ==
=== A division ===
==== Qualification ====
The following nations qualified to participate in the 2022 European Curling Championship:

Event	Vacancies	Qualified
2022 European Curling Championships A Division	8	Denmark; Switzerland; Scotland; Italy; Sweden; Turkey; Germany; Norway
2022 European Curling Championships B Division	2	Estonia; Czech Republic
TOTAL	10	

==== Teams ====
The teams are listed as follows:

Czech Republic	Denmark	Estonia	Germany	Italy
Skip: Anna Kubešková; Third: Michaela Baudyšová; Second: Aneta Müllerová; Lead: Klára Svatoňová; Alternate: Karolína Špundová	Skip: Madeleine Dupont; Third: Mathilde Halse; Second: Jasmin Lander; Lead: My Larsen; Alternate: Denise Dupont	Skip: Marie Kaldvee; Third: Erika Tuvike; Second: Liisa Turmann; Lead: Heili Grossmann; Alternate: Kerli Laidsalu	Fourth: Emira Abbes; Skip: Mia Höhne; Second: Lena Kapp; Lead: Maike Beer; Alternate: Pia-Lisa Schöll	Skip: Stefania Constantini; Third: Elena Mathis; Second: Angela Romei; Lead: Giulia Zardini Lacedelli; Alternate: Marta Lo Deserto
Norway	Scotland	Sweden	Switzerland	Turkey
Fourth: Kristin Skaslien; Skip: Marianne Rørvik; Second: Mille Haslev Nordbye; Lead: Martine Rønning; Alternate: Ingeborg Forbregd	Skip: Rebecca Morrison; Third: Jennifer Dodds; Second: Gina Aitken; Lead: Sophie Jackson; Alternate: Sophie Sinclair	Skip: Isabella Wranå; Third: Almida de Val; Second: Maria Larsson; Lead: Linda Stenlund; Alternate: Jennie Wåhlin	Fourth: Alina Pätz; Skip: Silvana Tirinzoni; Second: Selina Witschonke; Lead: Carole Howald; Alternate: Stefanie Berset	Skip: Dilşat Yıldız; Third: Öznur Polat; Second: İfayet Şafak Çalıkuşu; Lead: Berfin Şengül; Alternate: Mihriban Polat

==== Round robin standings ====
Final Round Robin Standings

Key
Teams to Playoffs and Qualified for the 2024 World Women's Curling Championship
Teams Qualified for the 2024 World Women's Curling Championship
Teams Relegated to 2024 B Division

Country	Skip	W	L	W–L	PF	PA	EW	EL	BE	SE	S%	DSC
Switzerland	Silvana Tirinzoni	9	0	–	69	32	40	26	6	15	88.3%	39.99
Italy	Stefania Constantini	7	2	–	73	59	39	38	4	9	81.5%	46.39
Sweden	Isabella Wranå	6	3	1–0	71	52	45	34	4	13	79.9%	32.96
Norway	Marianne Rørvik	6	3	0–1	57	50	41	34	4	13	79.5%	79.01
Scotland	Rebecca Morrison	5	4	–	60	51	37	33	9	12	83.9%	46.19
Estonia	Marie Kaldvee	3	6	1–0	57	66	33	41	1	7	78.7%	37.53
Denmark	Madeleine Dupont	3	6	0–1	56	66	37	40	0	13	74.0%	66.99
Turkey	Dilşat Yıldız	2	7	2–0	48	67	32	43	5	6	71.1%	36.88
Czech Republic	Anna Kubešková	2	7	1–1	40	73	31	39	3	3	74.5%	42.27
Germany	Mia Höhne	2	7	0–2	53	68	35	42	6	6	74.4%	59.66

Round Robin Summary Table
Pos.	Country	Czech Republic	Denmark	Estonia	Germany	Italy	Norway	Scotland	Sweden	Switzerland	Turkey	Record
9	Czech Republic	—	2–9	9–6	9–8	3–10	3–8	1–8	4–10	4–8	5–6	2–7
7	Denmark	9–2	—	7–8	6–8	7–9	4–5	11–9	5–8	1–12	6–5	3–6
6	Estonia	6–9	8–7	—	9–3	7–11	4–8	4–6	5–9	5–6	9–7	3–6
10	Germany	8–9	8–6	3–9	—	11–8	4–6	3–5	5–8	6–8	5–9	2–7
2	Italy	10–3	9–7	11–7	8–11	—	7–6	7–6	9–8	2–7	10–4	7–2
4	Norway	8–3	5–4	8–4	6–4	6–7	—	9–7	4–7	4–8	7–6	6–3
5	Scotland	8–1	9–11	6–4	5–3	6–7	7–9	—	9–7	2–5	8–4	5–4
3	Sweden	10–4	8–5	9–5	8–5	8–9	7–4	7–9	—	4–8	10–3	6–3
1	Switzerland	8–4	12–1	6–5	8–6	7–2	8–4	5–2	8–4	—	7–4	9–0
8	Turkey	6–5	5–6	7–9	9–5	4–10	6–7	4–8	3–10	4–7	—	2–7

==== Round robin results ====
All draw times are listed in Greenwich Mean Time (UTC+00:00).

===== Draw 1 =====
Saturday, November 18, 9:00

Sheet A	1	2	3	4	5	6	7	8	9	10	11	Final
Italy (Constantini) 🔨	0	2	0	2	0	1	0	0	1	2	0	8
Germany (Höhne)	1	0	2	0	1	0	2	2	0	0	3	11

Sheet B	1	2	3	4	5	6	7	8	9	10	Final
Sweden (Wranå) 🔨	2	0	1	1	0	2	0	3	1	X	10
Czech Republic (Kubešková)	0	1	0	0	2	0	1	0	0	X	4

Sheet C	1	2	3	4	5	6	7	8	9	10	Final
Switzerland (Tirinzoni) 🔨	2	4	1	3	2	0	X	X	X	X	12
Denmark (Dupont)	0	0	0	0	0	1	X	X	X	X	1

Sheet D	1	2	3	4	5	6	7	8	9	10	Final
Norway (Rørvik)	0	0	1	0	1	2	2	1	1	X	8
Estonia (Kaldvee) 🔨	2	1	0	1	0	0	0	0	0	X	4

Sheet E	1	2	3	4	5	6	7	8	9	10	Final
Turkey (Yıldız)	0	0	0	0	2	0	0	2	0	0	4
Scotland (Morrison) 🔨	2	1	1	0	0	1	0	0	1	2	8

===== Draw 2 =====
Saturday, November 18, 19:30

Sheet A	1	2	3	4	5	6	7	8	9	10	Final
Czech Republic (Kubešková)	0	1	0	0	1	0	1	0	0	X	3
Norway (Rørvik) 🔨	2	0	0	1	0	1	0	2	2	X	8

Sheet B	1	2	3	4	5	6	7	8	9	10	Final
Germany (Höhne) 🔨	1	0	0	1	0	0	1	0	X	X	3
Estonia (Kaldvee)	0	2	0	0	2	2	0	3	X	X	9

Sheet C	1	2	3	4	5	6	7	8	9	10	Final
Turkey (Yıldız) 🔨	0	0	1	0	0	2	0	1	X	X	4
Italy (Constantini)	2	2	0	3	1	0	2	0	X	X	10

Sheet D	1	2	3	4	5	6	7	8	9	10	Final
Scotland (Morrison)	0	3	1	0	2	0	0	2	1	0	9
Denmark (Dupont) 🔨	2	0	0	5	0	1	2	0	0	1	11

Sheet E	1	2	3	4	5	6	7	8	9	10	Final
Sweden (Wranå) 🔨	2	0	1	0	1	0	0	0	0	0	4
Switzerland (Tirinzoni)	0	2	0	1	0	2	0	1	1	1	8

===== Draw 3 =====
Sunday, November 19, 14:00

Sheet A	1	2	3	4	5	6	7	8	9	10	Final
Denmark (Dupont)	0	0	0	2	0	2	0	1	0	X	5
Sweden (Wranå) 🔨	0	1	1	0	1	0	3	0	2	X	8

Sheet B	1	2	3	4	5	6	7	8	9	10	Final
Italy (Constantini) 🔨	1	0	0	2	0	1	1	0	2	0	7
Scotland (Morrison)	0	1	0	0	3	0	0	1	0	1	6

Sheet C	1	2	3	4	5	6	7	8	9	10	Final
Germany (Höhne) 🔨	0	0	1	0	0	2	0	0	1	0	4
Norway (Rørvik)	0	0	0	1	1	0	1	0	0	3	6

Sheet D	1	2	3	4	5	6	7	8	9	10	Final
Switzerland (Tirinzoni) 🔨	0	1	0	2	1	0	0	3	0	X	7
Turkey (Yıldız)	0	0	2	0	0	1	0	0	1	X	4

Sheet E	1	2	3	4	5	6	7	8	9	10	Final
Czech Republic (Kubešková) 🔨	0	1	0	1	0	2	0	2	1	2	9
Estonia (Kaldvee)	0	0	3	0	1	0	2	0	0	0	6

===== Draw 4 =====
Monday, November 20, 8:00

Sheet A	1	2	3	4	5	6	7	8	9	10	Final
Estonia (Kaldvee)	0	2	0	0	3	1	0	0	3	X	9
Turkey (Yıldız) 🔨	1	0	2	3	0	0	0	1	0	X	7

Sheet B	1	2	3	4	5	6	7	8	9	10	Final
Switzerland (Tirinzoni) 🔨	2	0	3	0	1	0	2	0	X	X	8
Norway (Rørvik)	0	1	0	1	0	1	0	1	X	X	4

Sheet C	1	2	3	4	5	6	7	8	9	10	Final
Scotland (Morrison) 🔨	0	0	2	0	0	1	5	X	X	X	8
Czech Republic (Kubešková)	0	0	0	1	0	0	0	X	X	X	1

Sheet D	1	2	3	4	5	6	7	8	9	10	Final
Denmark (Dupont)	0	1	0	2	0	1	1	0	1	1	7
Italy (Constantini) 🔨	2	0	3	0	2	0	0	2	0	0	9

Sheet E	1	2	3	4	5	6	7	8	9	10	Final
Germany (Höhne)	0	0	2	0	2	0	0	0	1	X	5
Sweden (Wranå) 🔨	0	2	0	2	0	2	1	1	0	X	8

===== Draw 5 =====
Monday, November 20, 16:00

Sheet A	1	2	3	4	5	6	7	8	9	10	Final
Switzerland (Tirinzoni) 🔨	4	0	1	1	0	1	1	0	X	X	8
Czech Republic (Kubešková)	0	2	0	0	1	0	0	1	X	X	4

Sheet B	1	2	3	4	5	6	7	8	9	10	Final
Turkey (Yıldız)	0	4	0	3	0	0	1	0	1	X	9
Germany (Höhne) 🔨	1	0	0	0	1	1	0	2	0	X	5

Sheet C	1	2	3	4	5	6	7	8	9	10	Final
Italy (Constantini)	4	0	1	0	0	0	1	2	3	X	11
Estonia (Kaldvee) 🔨	0	2	0	3	1	1	0	0	0	X	7

Sheet D	1	2	3	4	5	6	7	8	9	10	Final
Sweden (Wranå) 🔨	0	0	1	1	0	2	0	2	0	1	7
Scotland (Morrison)	1	2	0	0	4	0	1	0	1	0	9

Sheet E	1	2	3	4	5	6	7	8	9	10	Final
Norway (Rørvik)	1	0	0	1	0	0	1	0	1	1	5
Denmark (Dupont) 🔨	0	1	0	0	2	0	0	1	0	0	4

===== Draw 6 =====
Tuesday, November 21, 9:00

Sheet A	1	2	3	4	5	6	7	8	9	10	Final
Turkey (Yıldız) 🔨	1	0	0	0	2	0	0	1	1	0	5
Denmark (Dupont)	0	2	1	0	0	1	1	0	0	1	6

Sheet B	1	2	3	4	5	6	7	8	9	10	Final
Czech Republic (Kubešková) 🔨	1	0	1	0	0	1	0	X	X	X	3
Italy (Constantini)	0	1	0	1	3	0	5	X	X	X	10

Sheet C	1	2	3	4	5	6	7	8	9	10	Final
Norway (Rørvik)	1	0	0	2	0	0	0	0	1	X	4
Sweden (Wranå) 🔨	0	2	0	0	1	1	1	2	0	X	7

Sheet D	1	2	3	4	5	6	7	8	9	10	Final
Estonia (Kaldvee) 🔨	0	2	0	1	0	1	0	1	0	0	5
Switzerland (Tirinzoni)	1	0	2	0	1	0	2	0	0	0	6

Sheet E	1	2	3	4	5	6	7	8	9	10	Final
Scotland (Morrison) 🔨	0	1	0	1	2	0	0	0	1	X	5
Germany (Höhne)	1	0	1	0	0	1	0	0	0	X	3

===== Draw 7 =====
Tuesday, November 21, 19:00

Sheet A	1	2	3	4	5	6	7	8	9	10	Final
Sweden (Wranå) 🔨	0	1	0	1	0	5	1	0	1	X	9
Estonia (Kaldvee)	0	0	1	0	3	0	0	1	0	X	5

Sheet B	1	2	3	4	5	6	7	8	9	10	Final
Scotland (Morrison)	0	0	0	0	0	1	0	0	1	X	2
Switzerland (Tirinzoni) 🔨	0	1	0	1	1	0	0	2	0	X	5

Sheet C	1	2	3	4	5	6	7	8	9	10	Final
Denmark (Dupont) 🔨	2	0	0	0	1	1	0	1	1	0	6
Germany (Höhne)	0	2	2	1	0	0	1	0	0	2	8

Sheet D	1	2	3	4	5	6	7	8	9	10	Final
Turkey (Yıldız)	0	0	1	0	0	2	2	0	1	0	6
Czech Republic (Kubešková) 🔨	0	1	0	1	0	0	0	2	0	1	5

Sheet E	1	2	3	4	5	6	7	8	9	10	Final
Italy (Constantini) 🔨	0	2	0	2	0	1	0	0	2	0	7
Norway (Rørvik)	0	0	2	0	1	0	2	0	0	1	6

===== Draw 8 =====
Wednesday, November 22, 14:00

Sheet A	1	2	3	4	5	6	7	8	9	10	Final
Germany (Höhne)	0	1	0	2	0	1	0	0	2	0	6
Switzerland (Tirinzoni) 🔨	2	0	1	0	2	0	2	0	0	1	8

Sheet B	1	2	3	4	5	6	7	8	9	10	Final
Norway (Rørvik)	0	0	0	1	2	0	2	0	1	1	7
Turkey (Yıldız) 🔨	2	1	1	0	0	1	0	1	0	0	6

Sheet C	1	2	3	4	5	6	7	8	9	10	Final
Estonia (Kaldvee)	0	0	1	0	0	2	0	0	1	X	4
Scotland (Morrison) 🔨	0	2	0	1	1	0	0	2	0	X	6

Sheet D	1	2	3	4	5	6	7	8	9	10	Final
Italy (Constantini) 🔨	0	1	0	2	0	3	0	2	0	1	9
Sweden (Wranå)	1	0	1	0	2	0	3	0	1	0	8

Sheet E	1	2	3	4	5	6	7	8	9	10	Final
Denmark (Dupont)	0	1	1	1	3	3	0	X	X	X	9
Czech Republic (Kubešková) 🔨	1	0	0	0	0	0	1	X	X	X	2

===== Draw 9 =====
Thursday, November 23, 9:00

Sheet A	1	2	3	4	5	6	7	8	9	10	Final
Norway (Rørvik) 🔨	0	3	0	0	3	0	1	0	1	1	9
Scotland (Morrison)	1	0	1	3	0	0	0	2	0	0	7

Sheet B	1	2	3	4	5	6	7	8	9	10	Final
Estonia (Kaldvee) 🔨	0	2	1	0	0	1	0	0	3	1	8
Denmark (Dupont)	0	0	0	3	1	0	2	1	0	0	7

Sheet C	1	2	3	4	5	6	7	8	9	10	Final
Sweden (Wranå) 🔨	2	0	1	0	2	0	2	1	2	X	10
Turkey (Yıldız)	0	1	0	1	0	1	0	0	0	X	3

Sheet D	1	2	3	4	5	6	7	8	9	10	11	Final
Czech Republic (Kubešková) 🔨	0	2	0	1	0	1	3	0	1	0	1	9
Germany (Höhne)	0	0	3	0	2	0	0	2	0	1	0	8

Sheet E	1	2	3	4	5	6	7	8	9	10	Final
Switzerland (Tirinzoni)	1	1	0	0	5	0	X	X	X	X	7
Italy (Constantini) 🔨	0	0	0	1	0	1	X	X	X	X	2

==== Playoffs ====
Semifinals
1	Switzerland	8
4	Norway	3
2	Italy	11
3	Sweden	2

Gold medal game
1	Switzerland	6
2	Italy	5
Bronze medal game
4	Norway	10
3	Sweden	3

===== Semifinals =====
Thursday, November 23, 19:00

Sheet B	1	2	3	4	5	6	7	8	9	10	Final
Italy (Constantini) 🔨	4	1	2	1	2	0	0	1	X	X	11
Sweden (Wranå)	0	0	0	0	0	1	1	0	X	X	2

Player percentages
Italy		Sweden	
Giulia Zardini Lacedelli	95%	Linda Stenlund	95%
Angela Romei	88%	Maria Larsson	77%
Elena Mathis	94%	Almida de Val	59%
Stefania Constantini	100%	Isabella Wranå	66%
Total	94%	Total	74%

Sheet D	1	2	3	4	5	6	7	8	9	10	Final
Switzerland (Tirinzoni) 🔨	0	2	0	2	0	0	0	2	2	X	8
Norway (Rørvik)	0	0	1	0	1	0	1	0	0	X	3

Player percentages
Switzerland		Norway	
Carole Howald	92%	Martine Rønning	92%
Selina Witschonke	96%	Mille Haslev Nordbye	68%
Silvana Tirinzoni	94%	Marianne Rørvik	86%
Alina Pätz	97%	Kristin Skaslien	74%
Total	95%	Total	80%

===== Bronze medal game =====
Friday, November 24, 14:00

Sheet C	1	2	3	4	5	6	7	8	9	10	Final
Norway (Rørvik)	0	2	2	4	0	1	0	1	X	X	10
Sweden (Wranå) 🔨	0	0	0	0	1	0	2	0	X	X	3

Player percentages
Norway		Sweden	
Martine Rønning	93%	Linda Stenlund	86%
Mille Haslev Nordbye	84%	Maria Larsson	69%
Marianne Rørvik	88%	Almida de Val	73%
Kristin Skaslien	88%	Isabella Wranå	63%
Total	88%	Total	73%

===== Gold medal game =====
Saturday, November 25, 9:00

Sheet C	1	2	3	4	5	6	7	8	9	10	Final
Switzerland (Tirinzoni) 🔨	0	0	2	0	1	1	0	1	0	1	6
Italy (Constantini)	0	1	0	1	0	0	1	0	2	0	5

Player percentages
Switzerland		Italy	
Carole Howald	93%	Giulia Zardini Lacedelli	88%
Selina Witschonke	96%	Angela Romei	78%
Silvana Tirinzoni	84%	Elena Mathis	85%
Alina Pätz	86%	Stefania Constantini	88%
Total	90%	Total	84%

==== Player percentages ====
Round robin only

Leads	%
(Switzerland) Carole Howald	91.7
(Norway) Martine Rønning	88.4
(Scotland) Sophie Jackson	87.6
(Sweden) Linda Stenlund	84.9
(Czech Republic) Klára Svatoňová	84.9

Seconds	%
(Italy) Angela Romei	85.4
(Switzerland) Selina Witschonke	85.0
(Estonia) Liisa Turmann	80.5
(Sweden) Maria Larsson	79.5
(Scotland) Gina Aitken	79.1

Thirds	%
(Switzerland) Silvana Tirinzoni (Skip)	85.1
(Scotland) Jennifer Dodds	84.7
(Sweden) Almida de Val	78.4
(Estonia) Erika Tuvike	78.3
(Norway) Marianne Rørvik (Skip)	77.9

Skips	%
(Switzerland) Alina Pätz (Fourth)	91.0
(Italy) Stefania Constantini	80.6
(Scotland) Rebecca Morrison	78.1
(Sweden) Isabella Wranå	75.1
(Estonia) Marie Kaldvee	74.9
(Norway) Kristin Skaslien (Fourth)	74.9

==== Final standings ====
Key
Teams Advance to the 2024 World Women's Curling Championship
Teams Relegated to 2024 B Division

Place	Team
1st place, gold medalist(s)	Switzerland
2nd place, silver medalist(s)	Italy
3rd place, bronze medalist(s)	Norway
4	Sweden
5	Scotland
6	Estonia
7	Denmark
8	Turkey
9	Czech Republic
10	Germany

=== B division ===
==== Teams ====
The teams are listed as follows:

Austria	Belgium	England	Finland	Hungary
Fourth: Hannah Augustin; Skip: Verena Pflügler; Second: Johanna Höss; Lead: Jill Witschen; Alternate: Julia Kotek	Fourth: Danielle Berus; Skip: Caro van Oosterwick; Second: Kim Catteceur; Lead: Annemiek Huiskamp; Alternate: Veerle Geerinckx	Skip: Anna Fowler; Third: Hetty Garnier; Second: Angharad Ward; Lead: Naomi Robinson; Alternate: Lisa Farnell	Skip: Miia Ahrenberg; Third: Minna Karvinen; Second: Tiina Suuripää; Lead: Tuuli Rissanen; Alternate: Ella Eivola	Fourth: Linda Joó; Skip: Vera Kalocsai-van Dorp; Third: Laura Nagy; Second: Orosolya Tóth-Csősz; Alternate: Hanna Orbán
Latvia	Lithuania	Poland	Slovakia	Slovenia
Skip: Evelīna Barone; Third: Rēzija Ieviņa; Second: Veronika Aspe; Lead: Marija Seliverstova; Alternate: Letīcija Ieviņa	Skip: Virginija Paulauskaitė; Third: Olga Dvojeglazova; Second: Rūta Blažienė; Lead: Justina Zalieckienė; Alternate: Miglė Kiudytė	Skip: Aneta Lipińska; Third: Ewa Nogły; Second: Marta Leszczyńska; Lead: Magdalena Kołodziej	Skip: Daniela Matulová; Third: Lucia Orokocká; Second: Ema Valachová; Lead: Martina Ščepková; Alternate: Gabriela Kajanová	Fourth: Maruša Gorišek; Third: Nadja Pipan; Skip: Ajda Zavrtanik Drglin; Lead: Liza Gregori; Alternate: Anja Pečaver

==== Round robin standings ====
Final Round Robin Standings

Key
Teams to Playoffs
Teams Relegated to 2024 C Division

Country	Skip	W	L	W–L	DSC
Poland	Aneta Lipińska	8	1	–	101.60
Latvia	Evelīna Barone	7	2	1–0	74.91
Hungary	Vera Kalocsai-van Dorp	7	2	0–1	61.56
Lithuania	Virginija Paulauskaitė	6	3	1–0	59.64
England	Anna Fowler	6	3	0–1	70.16
Finland	Miia Ahrenberg	5	4	–	91.34
Austria	Verena Pflügler	3	6	–	93.39
Slovenia	Ajda Zavrtanik Drglin	2	7	–	67.16
Belgium	Caro van Oosterwyck	1	8	–	107.12
Slovakia	Daniela Matulová	0	9	–	121.14

Round Robin Summary Table
Pos.	Country	Austria	Belgium	England	Finland	Hungary	Latvia	Lithuania	Poland	Slovakia	Slovenia	Record
7	Austria	—	9–2	5–7	2–10	9–12	5–12	5–11	5–10	8–7	8–5	3–6
9	Belgium	2–9	—	7–10	4–9	3–14	2–12	2–11	5–10	9–2	7–10	1–8
5	England	7–5	10–7	—	10–4	4–9	6–4	6–7	3–9	11–3	10–3	6–3
6	Finland	10–2	9–4	4–10	—	3–8	8–9	8–5	4–10	6–4	11–9	5–4
3	Hungary	12–9	14–3	9–4	8–3	—	5–7	8–0	5–6	10–5	7–5	7–2
2	Latvia	12–5	12–2	4–6	9–8	7–5	—	8–2	3–8	12–4	8–1	7–2
4	Lithuania	11–5	11–2	7–6	5–8	0–8	2–8	—	5–4	11–7	8–6	6–3
1	Poland	10–5	10–5	9–3	10–4	6–5	8–3	4–5	—	13–0	9–4	8–1
10	Slovakia	7–8	2–9	3–11	4–6	5–10	4–12	7–11	0–13	—	4–14	0–9
8	Slovenia	5–8	10–7	3–10	9–11	5–7	1–8	6–8	4–9	14–4	—	2–7

==== Playoffs ====
Semifinals
1	Poland	6
4	Lithuania	10
2	Latvia	4
3	Hungary	5

Gold medal game
4	Lithuania	2
3	Hungary	9
Bronze medal game
1	Poland	7
2	Latvia	4

===== Semifinals =====
Friday, November 24, 10:00

Sheet C	1	2	3	4	5	6	7	8	9	10	Final
Poland (Lipińska) 🔨	3	0	2	0	0	0	0	0	1	X	6
Lithuania (Paulauskaitė)	0	3	0	2	2	0	1	2	0	X	10

Sheet D	1	2	3	4	5	6	7	8	9	10	Final
Latvia (Barone) 🔨	0	1	0	0	0	1	2	0	0	0	4
Hungary (Kalocsai-van Dorp)	0	0	1	1	1	0	0	1	0	1	5

===== Bronze medal game =====
Saturday, November 25, 10:00

Sheet B	1	2	3	4	5	6	7	8	9	10	Final
Poland (Lipińska) 🔨	1	1	0	2	1	0	1	1	0	X	7
Latvia (Barone)	0	0	2	0	0	1	0	0	1	X	4

===== Gold medal game =====
Saturday, November 25, 14:00

Sheet B	1	2	3	4	5	6	7	8	9	10	Final
Lithuania (Paulauskaitė)	0	0	0	1	0	0	1	0	X	X	2
Hungary (Kalocsai-van Dorp) 🔨	1	0	2	0	1	1	0	4	X	X	9

==== Final standings ====
Key
Teams Qualify for 2024 A Division
Teams Relegated to 2024 C Division

Place	Team
1st place, gold medalist(s)	Hungary
2nd place, silver medalist(s)	Lithuania
3rd place, bronze medalist(s)	Poland
4	Latvia
5	England
6	Finland
7	Austria
8	Slovenia
9	Belgium
10	Slovakia

=== C division ===
==== Teams ====
The teams are listed as follows:

France	Ireland	Netherlands	Poland	Portugal
Fourth: Allison Brageul; Skip: Élodie Fuchs; Second: Elodie Verger; Lead: Sylvie Reist	Fourth: Alison Fyfe; Skip: Ailsa Barron; Second: Jen Ward; Lead: Erin Furey	Skip: Lisenka Bomas; Third: Marit van Valkenhoef; Second: Anandi Bomas; Lead: Linde Nas; Alternate: Kimberly Glasbergen-Honders	Skip: Aneta Lipińska; Third: Ewa Nogły; Second: Marta Leszczyńska; Lead: Magdalena Kołodziej	Skip: April Gale Seixeiro; Third: Antonieta Martins Ethier; Second: Irene Pita-Goodis; Lead: Graciete Martins Folster; Alternate: Fiona Grace Simpson
Serbia	Slovakia	Spain	Ukraine	Wales
Fourth: Dara Gravara-Stojanović; Third: Dragana Bajkanović; Second: Tamara Kurešević; Skip: Olivera Momčilović	Fourth: Daniela Matulová; Skip: Gabriela Kajanová; Second: Paulina Hajduk; Lead: Martina Ščepková; Alternate: Jana Matulová	Fourth: Daniela García; Third: María Gómez; Skip: Patricia Ruiz; Lead: Emma López	Skip: Anastasiia Kotova; Third: Yaroslava Kalinichenko; Second: Oleksandra Kononenko; Lead: Diana Moskalenko; Alternate: Anastasiia Mosol	Skip: Laura Beever; Third: Judith Glazier; Second: Emily Simpson; Lead: Anna Carruthers

==== Round robin standings ====
Key
Teams to Playoffs

Country	Skip	W	L	W–L	DSC
Poland	Aneta Lipińska	7	2	–	58.74
Slovakia	Gabriela Kajanová	6	3	2–0	67.23
Portugal	April Gale Seixeiro	6	3	1–1	83.60
Ireland	Ailsa Barron	6	3	0–2	78.98
Ukraine	Anastasiia Kotova	5	4	1–0	84.94
Spain	Patricia Ruiz	5	4	0–1	95.76
Netherlands	Lisenka Bomas	4	5	–	53.49
France	Élodie Fuchs	3	6	1–0	106.85
Wales	Laura Beever	3	6	0–1	91.23
Serbia	Olivera Momčilović	0	9	–	159.77

Round Robin Summary Table
Pos.	Country	France		Netherlands	Poland	Portugal	Serbia	Slovakia	Spain	Ukraine	Wales	Record
8	France	—	7–8	7–5	2–9	1–9	8–1	4–8	3–12	6–12	9–8	3–6
4	Ireland	8–7	—	10–2	5–9	4–6	13–2	4–8	7–5	7–5	7–4	6–3
7	Netherlands	5–7	2–10	—	4–6	7–9	13–2	10–1	7–6	4–5	8–5	4–5
1	Poland	9–2	9–5	6–4	—	4–9	22–0	8–4	3–8	7–5	10–6	7–2
3	Portugal	9–1	6–4	9–7	9–4	—	13–1	4–8	6–5	3–8	4–6	6–3
10	Serbia	1–8	2–13	2–13	0–22	1–13	—	1–14	1–14	0–13	1–11	0–9
2	Slovakia	8–4	8–4	1–10	4–8	8–4	14–1	—	6–10	9–3	7–4	6–3
6	Spain	12–3	5–7	6–7	8–3	5–6	14–1	10–6	—	4–6	8–6	5–4
5	Ukraine	12–6	5–7	5–4	5–7	8–3	13–0	3–9	6–4	—	6–7	5–4
9	Wales	8–9	4–7	5–8	6–10	6–4	11–1	4–7	6–8	7–6	—	3–6

==== Playoffs ====
Semifinals
1	Poland	6
4	Ireland	0
2	Slovakia	10
3	Portugal	7

Gold medal game
1	Poland	8
2	Slovakia	7
Bronze medal game
4	Ireland	9
3	Portugal	6

===== Semifinals =====
Thursday, May 4, 9:00

Sheet B	1	2	3	4	5	6	7	8	Final
Poland (Lipińska) 🔨	1	1	1	0	1	2	X	X	6
Ireland (Barron)	0	0	0	0	0	0	X	X	0

Sheet D	1	2	3	4	5	6	7	8	Final
Slovakia (Kajanová) 🔨	0	0	1	0	0	4	2	3	10
Portugal (Gale Seixeiro)	1	1	0	4	1	0	0	0	7

===== Bronze medal game =====
Thursday, May 4, 14:30

Sheet A	1	2	3	4	5	6	7	8	Final
Ireland (Barron)	0	3	0	2	0	3	0	1	9
Portugal (Gale Seixeiro) 🔨	3	0	2	0	0	0	1	0	6

===== Gold medal game =====
Thursday, May 4, 14:30

Sheet C	1	2	3	4	5	6	7	8	9	Final
Poland (Lipińska) 🔨	3	1	0	1	0	1	1	0	1	8
Slovakia (Kajanová)	0	0	2	0	4	0	0	1	0	7

==== Final standings ====
Key
Promoted to 2023 B division

Place	Team
1st place, gold medalist(s)	Poland
2nd place, silver medalist(s)	Slovakia
3rd place, bronze medalist(s)	Ireland
4	Portugal
5	Ukraine
6	Spain
7	Netherlands
8	France
9	Wales
10	Serbia
