= 2019 World Mixed Doubles Qualification Event =

Curling event in Scotland

- Host city: Howwood, Scotland
- Arena: Greenacres Curling Club
- Dates: December 2-7, 2019
- Qualifiers: Germany; Italy; South Korea; China

The 2019 World Mixed Doubles Qualification Event was held December 2–7, 2019 at the Greenacres Curling Club in Howwood, Scotland. It was the inaugural qualification event for the World Mixed Doubles Curling Championship, which was previously an open entry event.

The tournament was open to any World Curling Federation member not already qualified for the 2020 World Mixed Doubles Curling Championship with the top four teams from this event qualifying to play in the Championship in Kelowna, Canada. The four teams that qualified were Germany, Italy, South Korea and China.

== Teams ==
Twenty-eight teams are registered for the tournament:

Austria	Belarus	Belgium	Brazil
Female: Hannah Augustin; Male: Martin Reichel	Female: Tatsiana Tarsunova; Male: Ilya Shalamitski	Female: Veerle Geerinckx; Male: Dirk Heylen	Female: Luciana Barrella; Male: Marcio Cerquinho
China	Chinese Taipei	Denmark	France
Female: Yang Ying; Male: Ling Zhi	Female: Amanda Chou; Male: Brendon Liu	Female: Christine Grønbech; Male: Martin Grønbech	Female: Sandrine Morand; Male: Romain Borini
Germany	Guyana	Hong Kong	Ireland
Female: Pia-Lisa Schöll; Male: Klaudius Harsch	Female: Farzana Hussain; Male: Rayad Hussain	Female: Ling-Yue Hung; Male: Jason Chang	Female: Alison Fyfe; Male: John Wilson
Italy	Kazakhstan	South Korea	Kosovo
Female: Veronica Zappone; Male: Simone Gonin	Female: Sitora Alliyarova; Male: Abylaikhan Zhuzbay	Female: Jang Hye-ji; Male: Seong Yu-jin	Female: Eldena Dakaj; Male: Peter Andersen
Latvia	Lithuania	Netherlands	Nigeria
Female: Ieva Rudzīte; Male: Artis Zentelis	Female: Akvilė Rykove; Male: Konstantin Rykov	Female: Lisenka Bomas; Male: Bob Bomas	Female: Susana Cole; Male: Tijani Cole
Poland	Romania	Saudi Arabia	Slovakia
Female: Marta Szeliga-Frynia; Male: Paweł Frynia	Female: Iulia Trăilă; Male: Allen Coliban	Female: Karrie Al-Aqel; Male: Suleiman Al-Aqel	Female: Daniela Matulová; Male: Milan Moravčík
Slovenia	Turkey	Ukraine	Wales
Female: Irena Manček; Male: Gaber Bor Zelinka	Female: Dilşat Yıldız; Male: Uğurcan Karagöz	Female: Anastasiia Kotova; Male: Mykyta Velychko	Female: Heather Russell; Male: Michael Thackray

== Round robin standings ==
Final Round Robin Standings

The top two teams in each group qualify for the playoffs.

Key
Teams to Playoffs

Group A	W	L	W–L	DSC
Germany	6	0	–	35.08
China	5	1	–	22.94
Denmark	4	2	–	58.99
Guyana	3	3	–	66.27
Kosovo	1	5	1–1	56.57
Ukraine	1	5	1–1	125.48
Wales	1	5	1–1	148.49

Group B	W	L	W–L	DSC
Turkey	6	0	–	62.87
France	5	1	–	28.01
Ireland	4	2	–	76.49
Belgium	2	4	1–1	63.94
Romania	2	4	1–1	80.52
Brazil	2	4	1–1	84.48
Saudi Arabia	0	6	–	138.66

Group C	W	L	W–L	DSC
Italy	6	0	–	40.83
Latvia	3	3	2–1, 1–0	37.24
Chinese Taipei	3	3	2–1, 0–1	62.55
Hong Kong	3	3	1–2, 1–0	52.29
Poland	3	3	1–2, 0–1	88.74
Kazakhstan	2	4	–	44.27
Slovenia	1	5	–	87.68

Group D	W	L	W–L	DSC
South Korea	5	1	1–1	39.65
Austria	5	1	1–1	66.83
Belarus	5	1	1–1	75.15
Netherlands	3	3	–	75.87
Slovakia	2	4	–	65.94
Lithuania	1	5	–	138.68
Nigeria	0	6	–	175.83

== Round robin results ==
All draws are listed in Greenwich Mean Time (UTC±00:00)

=== Draw 1 ===
Monday, December 2, 17:15

Sheet A	1	2	3	4	5	6	7	8	Final
Austria 🔨	0	1	2	0	0	1	0	2	6
South Korea	1	0	0	1	2	0	1	0	5

Sheet B	1	2	3	4	5	6	7	8	Final
Hong Kong 🔨	1	1	1	1	0	1	0	2	7
Poland	0	0	0	0	1	0	1	0	2

Sheet C	1	2	3	4	5	6	7	8	Final
Latvia 🔨	0	1	1	1	0	4	1	X	8
Chinese Taipei	2	0	0	0	1	0	0	X	3

Sheet D	1	2	3	4	5	6	7	8	Final
Kazakhstan	1	0	0	1	0	2	0	X	4
Italy 🔨	0	2	2	0	5	0	1	X	10

Sheet E	1	2	3	4	5	6	7	8	Final
Netherlands 🔨	3	1	2	2	1	2	1	X	12
Nigeria	0	0	0	0	0	0	0	X	0

Sheet F	1	2	3	4	5	6	7	8	Final
Slovakia 🔨	0	1	0	0	2	1	0	1	5
Belarus	3	0	1	1	0	0	1	0	6

=== Draw 2 ===
Monday, December 2, 20:30

Sheet A	1	2	3	4	5	6	7	8	Final
China	0	5	0	1	0	2	0	0	8
Germany 🔨	1	0	1	0	5	0	1	2	10

Sheet B	1	2	3	4	5	6	7	8	Final
Belgium 🔨	1	0	0	0	1	0	2	X	4
France	0	2	4	1	0	4	0	X	11

Sheet C	1	2	3	4	5	6	7	8	Final
Kosovo	1	1	0	0	2	1	0	1	6
Ukraine 🔨	0	0	3	1	0	0	4	0	8

Sheet D	1	2	3	4	5	6	7	8	Final
Saudi Arabia	0	0	0	0	0	0	X	X	0
Turkey 🔨	1	4	2	3	1	1	X	X	12

Sheet E	1	2	3	4	5	6	7	8	Final
Denmark	0	3	1	0	0	3	2	X	9
Wales 🔨	1	0	0	1	1	0	0	X	3

Sheet F	1	2	3	4	5	6	7	8	Final
Romania 🔨	1	0	4	0	0	0	0	1	6
Ireland	0	1	0	1	2	0	5	0	9

=== Draw 3 ===
Tuesday, December 3, 09:00

Sheet A	1	2	3	4	5	6	7	8	Final
Italy 🔨	3	2	0	1	0	0	3	X	9
Latvia	0	0	3	0	1	1	0	X	5

Sheet B	1	2	3	4	5	6	7	8	9	Final
Slovakia	1	0	2	0	1	0	3	1	0	8
Netherlands 🔨	0	1	0	3	0	4	0	0	2	10

Sheet C	1	2	3	4	5	6	7	8	Final
Poland 🔨	0	1	2	0	0	2	0	3	8
Slovenia	1	0	0	1	1	0	1	0	4

Sheet D	1	2	3	4	5	6	7	8	Final
Belarus 🔨	4	1	1	0	2	1	X	X	9
Austria	0	0	0	2	0	0	X	X	2

Sheet E	1	2	3	4	5	6	7	8	Final
Chinese Taipei	0	2	1	1	0	3	0	2	9
Hong Kong 🔨	2	0	0	0	2	0	2	0	6

Sheet F	1	2	3	4	5	6	7	8	Final
South Korea 🔨	1	2	0	1	2	0	2	X	8
Lithuania	0	0	1	0	0	1	0	X	2

=== Draw 4 ===
Tuesday, December 3, 12:30

Sheet A	1	2	3	4	5	6	7	8	Final
Brazil 🔨	0	3	1	0	2	0	1	0	7
Belgium	1	0	0	1	0	4	0	3	9

Sheet B	1	2	3	4	5	6	7	8	Final
Germany 🔨	5	0	0	2	1	0	3	X	11
Guyana	0	3	1	0	0	1	0	X	5

Sheet C	1	2	3	4	5	6	7	8	Final
Saudi Arabia 🔨	0	1	2	1	0	0	0	X	4
Romania	3	0	0	0	3	5	2	X	13

Sheet D	1	2	3	4	5	6	7	8	Final
Denmark	2	1	2	1	0	3	X	X	9
Kosovo 🔨	0	0	0	0	1	0	X	X	1

Sheet E	1	2	3	4	5	6	7	8	Final
Turkey 🔨	2	2	0	4	0	0	2	X	10
Ireland	0	0	1	0	2	1	0	X	4

Sheet F	1	2	3	4	5	6	7	8	Final
Wales	1	1	2	0	4	0	1	4	13
Ukraine 🔨	0	0	0	5	0	1	0	0	6

=== Draw 5 ===
Tuesday, December 3, 16:00

Sheet A	1	2	3	4	5	6	7	8	Final
Nigeria	0	0	2	0	0	1	0	X	3
Slovakia 🔨	1	2	0	3	1	0	4	X	11

Sheet B	1	2	3	4	5	6	7	8	Final
Latvia 🔨	0	1	0	1	0	4	0	1	7
Kazakhstan	2	0	1	0	1	0	1	0	5

Sheet C	1	2	3	4	5	6	7	8	Final
Belarus	1	1	0	0	0	1	0	0	3
South Korea 🔨	0	0	1	1	2	0	1	2	7

Sheet D	1	2	3	4	5	6	7	8	Final
Chinese Taipei 🔨	0	2	0	2	1	2	0	1	8
Poland	2	0	1	0	0	0	1	0	4

Sheet E	1	2	3	4	5	6	7	8	Final
Austria 🔨	2	1	0	0	2	2	1	X	8
Lithuania	0	0	4	1	0	0	0	X	5

Sheet F	1	2	3	4	5	6	7	8	Final
Hong Kong 🔨	1	0	1	0	4	1	3	X	10
Slovenia	0	2	0	1	0	0	0	X	3

=== Draw 6 ===
Tuesday, December 3, 19:30

Sheet A	1	2	3	4	5	6	7	8	Final
France 🔨	4	2	1	0	2	1	X	X	10
Saudi Arabia	0	0	0	1	0	0	X	X	1

Sheet B	1	2	3	4	5	6	7	8	Final
Ukraine	0	0	0	1	0	1	0	X	2
China 🔨	1	3	1	0	2	0	4	X	11

Sheet C	1	2	3	4	5	6	7	8	Final
Ireland 🔨	2	0	5	0	3	0	0	X	10
Brazil	0	1	0	2	0	3	1	X	7

Sheet D	1	2	3	4	5	6	7	8	Final
Wales	0	0	0	0	0	0	1	X	1
Germany 🔨	3	2	1	1	1	1	0	X	9

Sheet E	1	2	3	4	5	6	7	8	Final
Belgium 🔨	0	1	0	0	1	1	0	0	3
Romania	1	0	2	1	0	0	1	2	7

Sheet F	1	2	3	4	5	6	7	8	9	Final
Guyana 🔨	1	1	0	2	0	1	0	0	0	5
Denmark	0	0	1	0	2	0	1	1	2	7

=== Draw 7 ===
Wednesday, December 4, 09:00

Sheet A	1	2	3	4	5	6	7	8	Final
Germany 🔨	3	2	1	0	0	2	X	X	8
Kosovo	0	0	0	1	1	0	X	X	2

Sheet B	1	2	3	4	5	6	7	8	Final
Saudi Arabia	0	0	0	1	0	0	X	X	1
Ireland 🔨	6	2	2	0	2	1	X	X	13

Sheet C	1	2	3	4	5	6	7	8	Final
Ukraine 🔨	1	1	0	0	0	0	X	X	2
Guyana	0	0	5	1	1	1	X	X	8

Sheet D	1	2	3	4	5	6	7	8	Final
Romania	2	0	1	0	0	1	0	X	4
France 🔨	0	2	0	1	2	0	1	X	6

Sheet E	1	2	3	4	5	6	7	8	Final
China 🔨	1	0	3	2	0	3	0	X	9
Denmark	0	2	0	0	2	0	1	X	5

Sheet F	1	2	3	4	5	6	7	8	Final
Brazil	0	0	0	1	0	0	0	X	1
Turkey 🔨	4	1	1	0	1	1	1	X	9

=== Draw 8 ===
Wednesday, December 4, 12:30

Sheet A	1	2	3	4	5	6	7	8	Final
Netherlands 🔨	1	0	0	0	1	0	0	X	2
Belarus	0	4	1	1	0	1	2	X	9

Sheet B	1	2	3	4	5	6	7	8	Final
Slovenia	0	0	0	0	1	0	X	X	1
Italy 🔨	1	1	2	2	0	4	X	X	10

Sheet C	1	2	3	4	5	6	7	8	Final
Lithuania 🔨	4	2	0	1	4	0	2	X	13
Nigeria	0	0	3	0	0	1	0	X	4

Sheet D	1	2	3	4	5	6	7	8	Final
Hong Kong 🔨	0	2	1	0	0	1	1	0	5
Latvia	1	0	0	1	2	0	0	2	6

Sheet E	1	2	3	4	5	6	7	8	Final
Slovakia	0	1	0	1	0	1	0	0	3
South Korea 🔨	2	0	1	0	3	0	1	5	12

Sheet F	1	2	3	4	5	6	7	8	Final
Kazakhstan 🔨	2	0	2	2	0	3	3	X	12
Chinese Taipei	0	1	0	0	2	0	0	X	3

=== Draw 9 ===
Wednesday, December 4, 16:00

Sheet A	1	2	3	4	5	6	7	8	Final
Denmark 🔨	2	2	2	1	0	4	X	X	11
Ukraine	0	0	0	0	1	0	X	X	1

Sheet B	1	2	3	4	5	6	7	8	Final
Turkey	1	1	1	1	1	1	3	X	9
Belgium 🔨	0	0	0	0	0	0	0	X	0

Sheet C	1	2	3	4	5	6	7	8	Final
China 🔨	3	2	1	3	2	1	X	X	12
Wales	0	0	0	0	0	0	X	X	0

Sheet D	1	2	3	4	5	6	7	8	9	Final
Brazil	1	0	0	2	0	2	0	0	3	8
Saudi Arabia 🔨	0	1	1	0	1	0	1	1	0	5

Sheet E	1	2	3	4	5	6	7	8	Final
Kosovo 🔨	0	0	0	1	0	1	X	X	2
Guyana	1	1	2	0	5	0	X	X	9

Sheet F	1	2	3	4	5	6	7	8	9	Final
Ireland	1	0	0	2	0	1	0	0	0	4
France 🔨	0	0	1	0	1	0	1	1	2	6

=== Draw 10 ===
Wednesday, December 4, 19:30

Sheet A	1	2	3	4	5	6	7	8	Final
Latvia	2	1	0	0	0	0	1	X	4
Poland 🔨	0	0	2	2	0	3	0	X	7

Sheet B	1	2	3	4	5	6	7	8	Final
Belarus 🔨	0	2	1	3	2	0	0	X	8
Lithuania	1	0	0	0	0	2	1	X	4

Sheet C	1	2	3	4	5	6	7	8	Final
Slovenia	0	2	0	1	0	0	X	X	3
Kazakhstan 🔨	2	0	6	0	4	1	X	X	13

Sheet D	1	2	3	4	5	6	7	8	Final
South Korea 🔨	0	4	2	2	2	1	X	X	11
Netherlands	1	0	0	0	0	0	X	X	1

Sheet E	1	2	3	4	5	6	7	8	Final
Italy 🔨	3	1	0	2	0	2	X	X	8
Chinese Taipei	0	0	1	0	1	0	X	X	2

Sheet F	1	2	3	4	5	6	7	8	Final
Nigeria	0	1	0	1	0	0	0	X	2
Austria 🔨	3	0	1	0	1	1	1	X	7

=== Draw 11 ===
Thursday, December 5, 09:00

Sheet A	1	2	3	4	5	6	7	8	Final
Guyana 🔨	3	0	2	0	1	1	2	X	9
Wales	0	1	0	3	0	0	0	X	4

Sheet B	1	2	3	4	5	6	7	8	Final
Romania 🔨	1	0	1	0	2	0	2	0	6
Brazil	0	1	0	2	0	3	0	1	7

Sheet C	1	2	3	4	5	6	7	8	Final
France 🔨	0	0	0	0	0	0	X	X	0
Turkey	3	4	1	1	2	1	X	X	12

Sheet D	1	2	3	4	5	6	7	8	9	Final
Ireland	2	0	0	1	0	3	1	0	1	8
Belgium 🔨	0	1	1	0	2	0	0	3	0	7

Sheet E	1	2	3	4	5	6	7	8	Final
Ukraine	0	1	0	0	0	0	X	X	1
Germany 🔨	1	0	4	2	3	1	X	X	11

Sheet F	1	2	3	4	5	6	7	8	Final
Kosovo 🔨	0	2	0	1	0	0	X	X	3
China	2	0	5	0	2	1	X	X	10

=== Draw 12 ===
Thursday, December 5, 12:30

Sheet A	1	2	3	4	5	6	7	8	Final
Chinese Taipei 🔨	0	0	3	1	0	0	2	1	7
Slovenia	2	1	0	0	2	1	0	0	6

Sheet B	1	2	3	4	5	6	7	8	Final
Austria 🔨	0	2	1	2	0	4	1	X	10
Slovakia	1	0	0	0	3	0	0	X	4

Sheet C	1	2	3	4	5	6	7	8	Final
Italy 🔨	1	0	1	0	2	3	0	2	9
Hong Kong	0	1	0	4	0	0	3	0	8

Sheet D	1	2	3	4	5	6	7	8	Final
Nigeria	0	0	0	0	1	0	X	X	1
Belarus 🔨	2	2	1	3	0	5	X	X	13

Sheet E	1	2	3	4	5	6	7	8	Final
Poland	1	0	0	1	1	0	2	1	6
Kazakhstan 🔨	0	1	1	0	0	1	0	0	3

Sheet F	1	2	3	4	5	6	7	8	Final
Lithuania	0	0	2	0	3	0	0	X	5
Netherlands 🔨	4	2	0	1	0	1	2	X	10

=== Draw 13 ===
Thursday, December 5, 16:00

Sheet A	1	2	3	4	5	6	7	8	Final
Turkey 🔨	4	1	0	1	2	2	X	X	10
Romania	0	0	1	0	0	0	X	X	1

Sheet B	1	2	3	4	5	6	7	8	Final
Wales	0	2	0	0	0	1	0	X	3
Kosovo 🔨	1	0	3	1	3	0	3	X	11

Sheet C	1	2	3	4	5	6	7	8	Final
Germany	1	0	0	3	1	0	2	0	7
Denmark 🔨	0	2	2	0	0	1	0	1	6

Sheet D	1	2	3	4	5	6	7	8	Final
Guyana	0	0	0	2	0	0	X	X	2
China 🔨	4	1	2	0	5	1	X	X	13

Sheet E	1	2	3	4	5	6	7	8	Final
France 🔨	1	1	1	1	0	4	X	X	8
Brazil	0	0	0	0	1	0	X	X	1

Sheet F	1	2	3	4	5	6	7	8	Final
Belgium 🔨	2	0	0	3	0	0	2	0	7
Saudi Arabia	0	1	1	0	2	1	0	1	6

=== Draw 14 ===
Thursday, December 5, 19:30

Sheet A	1	2	3	4	5	6	7	8	Final
Kazakhstan 🔨	0	0	0	4	1	0	0	0	5
Hong Kong	1	1	1	0	0	3	1	1	8

Sheet B	1	2	3	4	5	6	7	8	Final
South Korea 🔨	5	2	1	3	0	2	X	X	13
Nigeria	0	0	0	0	0	0	X	X	0

Sheet C	1	2	3	4	5	6	7	8	Final
Netherlands	1	0	0	0	1	0	3	0	5
Austria 🔨	0	2	1	1	0	2	0	1	7

Sheet D	1	2	3	4	5	6	7	8	9	Final
Lithuania	1	2	1	0	4	0	0	0	0	8
Slovakia 🔨	0	0	0	3	0	2	2	1	1	9

Sheet E	1	2	3	4	5	6	7	8	Final
Slovenia	0	2	1	0	3	0	0	0	6
Latvia 🔨	1	0	0	1	0	1	1	1	5

Sheet F	1	2	3	4	5	6	7	8	Final
Poland	0	0	0	0	0	2	0	X	2
Italy 🔨	3	1	1	2	1	0	1	X	9

== Playoffs ==
=== A Bracket ===
Qualifier 1
A1	Germany	13
C2	Latvia	6
A1	Germany	7
B1	Turkey	5
B1	Turkey	8
D2	Austria	6

Qualifier 2
C1	Italy	11
B2	France	4
C1	Italy	6
D1	South Korea	4
D1	South Korea	6
A2	China	4

=== B Bracket ===
			Qualifier 3
			D1	South Korea	7
C2	Latvia	3	D2	Austria	2
D2	Austria	6

			Qualifier 4
			B1	Turkey	7
B2	France	3	A2	China	8
A2	China	11

=== A Event ===
==== Semifinals ====
Friday, December 6, 10:00

Sheet 1	1	2	3	4	5	6	7	8	Final
Germany 🔨	5	0	1	0	2	0	5	X	13
Latvia	0	3	0	1	0	2	0	X	6

Sheet 2	1	2	3	4	5	6	7	8	Final
Turkey	0	2	0	0	1	2	0	3	8
Austria 🔨	2	0	2	1	0	0	1	0	6

Sheet 3	1	2	3	4	5	6	7	8	Final
Italy 🔨	4	0	3	0	3	1	X	X	11
France	0	2	0	2	0	0	X	X	4

Sheet 4	1	2	3	4	5	6	7	8	Final
South Korea	0	1	2	1	0	1	0	1	6
China 🔨	1	0	0	0	1	0	2	0	4

==== Finals ====
Friday, December 6, 15:00

Sheet 1	1	2	3	4	5	6	7	8	Final
Germany 🔨	1	0	1	2	2	0	1	X	7
Turkey	0	4	0	0	0	1	0	X	5

Sheet 2	1	2	3	4	5	6	7	8	Final
Italy 🔨	1	1	0	2	0	0	1	1	6
South Korea	0	0	1	0	1	2	0	0	4

=== B Event ===
==== Semifinals ====
Friday, December 6, 15:00

Sheet 3	1	2	3	4	5	6	7	8	Final
Latvia 🔨	1	1	0	0	1	0	0	0	3
Austria	0	0	1	1	0	2	1	1	6

Sheet 4	1	2	3	4	5	6	7	8	Final
France	0	1	1	0	0	1	X	X	3
China 🔨	4	0	0	6	1	0	X	X	11

==== Finals ====
Saturday, December 7, 10:00

Sheet 1	1	2	3	4	5	6	7	8	Final
South Korea	1	1	0	2	1	0	2	X	7
Austria 🔨	0	0	1	0	0	1	0	X	2

Sheet 2	1	2	3	4	5	6	7	8	9	Final
Turkey	0	0	1	0	1	0	3	2	0	7
China 🔨	2	1	0	1	0	3	0	0	1	8
