= Dirk Heylen =

Belgian male curler

- Curler ♂
- Born: 23 August 1967 (age 59)

Team
- Curling club: CC Mechelen, CC Zemst
- Mixed doubles partner: Veerle Geerinckx

Curling career
- Member Association: Belgium
- World Mixed Doubles Championship: 1 (2019)
- World Mixed Championship: 2 (2019, 2024)
- European Championship: 1 (2026)
- Other appearances: World Senior Championships: 1 (2019)

Dirk Heylen (born 23 August 1967) is a Belgian curler and curling coach. Heylen is secretary of the Belgian Curling Association (BCA) and is affiliated with Curling Club Zemst.

In mixed doubles he formed a team with Veerle Geerinckx. The duo participated in the 2019 World Mixed Doubles Curling Championship in Stavanger. Later that year, Heylen also participated in the 2019 World Mixed Curling Championship (for teams) in Aberdeen together with Veerle Geerinckx, Danielle Berus and Stephane Vandermeeren. In addition, he has been a member of the Belgian curling team, the Red Rocks, since 2005. As an alternate, he finished fifth with the national team in the 2023 European Curling Championships (B division) in Perth, Scotland.

He is left-handed and has been curling since 2003.

== Teams ==
=== Men's ===
Season	Skip	Third	Second	Lead	Alternate	Coach	Events
2005–06	Pieter-Jan Witzig	Marc Suter	Samie Witzig	Thomas Suter	Dirk Heylen	Rolf Siegrist	ECC 2005 (15th)
2006–07	Pieter-Jan Witzig	Marc Suter	Thomas Suter	Samie Witzig	Dirk Heylen		ECC 2006 (15th)
2007–08	Pieter-Jan Witzig	Marc Suter	Thomas Suter	Samie Witzig	Dirk Heylen	Willi Bless	ECC 2007 (23rd)
2008–09	Thomas Suter	Marc Suter	Walter Verbueken	Dirk Heylen	Peter Suter	Peter Suter	ECC 2008 (17th)
2013–14	Timothy Verreycken	Walter Verbueken	Nils Beosier	Dirk Heylen	Gregory Janbroers	Elly Lipkens	ECC 2013 (26th)
2014–15	Timothy Verreycken	Dirk Heylen	Walter Verbueken	Gregory Janbroers	Tom van Waterschoot		ECC 2014 (18th)
2018–19	Stefan van Dijck	Christophe Stessens	Bart Palmans	Tom van Loock	Dirk Heylen	Dirk Heylen	ECC 2018 (29th)
2018–19	John Robillard	Peter Suter	Gery Hermans	Wayne Fitzpatrick	Dirk Heylen	Helga Robillard	WSCC 2019 (18th)

=== Mixed ===
Season	Skip	Third	Second	Lead	Events
2019–20	Dirk Heylen (fourth)	Danielle Berus	Stephane Vandermeeren	Veerle Geerinckx (skip)	WMxCC 2019 (40th)

=== Mixed doubles ===
Season	Male	Female	Events
2018–19	Dirk Heylen	Veerle Geerinckx	WMDCC 2019 (40th)
2019–20	Dirk Heylen	Veerle Geerinckx	WMDQ 2019 (14th)
2025–26	Dirk Heylen	Veerle Geerinckx	WMDQ 2026 (TBD)

== Record as a coach of national teams ==
Year	Tournament, event	National team	Place
2008	2008 European Junior Curling Challenge	Belgium (junior men)	9
2009	2009 European Junior Curling Challenge	Belgium (junior men)	12
2011	2011 European Curling Championships (group C)	Belgium (women)	26 (total)
2015	2015 World Mixed Curling Championship	Belgium (mixed team)	28
2018	2018 European Curling Championships (group C)	Belgium (men)	29 (total)
