= WCT Tallinn Mens Challenger =

World Curling Tour event

- Established: 2015
- Host city: Tallinn, Estonia
- Arena: Tondiraba Ice Hall
- Purse: € 6,000
- 2026 champion: (Norway) Lukas Høstmælingen

The WCT Tallinn Mens Challenger, also known as the Tallinn Mens International Challenger, and the Tallinn Season Starter is an annual tournament on the men's World Curling Tour. It is held annually on the last weekend of September at the Tondiraba Ice Hall in Tallinn, Estonia.

The purse for the event is €3,000, with the winning team receiving €1,200.

The event has been held since 2015, and has been part of the World Curling Tour since 2017.

The 2022 event included 18 teams from 11 countries, including Norway, Spain, Poland, Latvia, Italy, Estonia, the Netherlands, Scotland, Sweden, Switzerland and Ukraine.

== Champions ==
Year	Winning team	Runner up team	Purse (€)	Winner's share (€)
2015	(Sweden) Rasmus Wranå	(Hungary) György Nagy		
2016	(Sweden) Gustav Eskilsson	(Estonia) Harri Lill		
2017	(Scotland) Cameron Bryce, Ross Whyte, Robin Brydone, Euan Kyle	(Latvia) Ritvars Gulbis, Raivis Bušmanis, Aivars Avotiņš, Roberts Krusts	€1,700	€700
2018	(Belarus) Ilya Shalamitski, Pavel Petrov, Dzimitry Rudnitski, Yevgeny Tamkovich	(Finland) Tomi Rantamäki, Jere Sullanmaa, Iikko Santti, Jermu Pollanen	€3,000	€1,200
2019	(Finland) Jere Sullanmaa, Jason Moore, Iikko Santti, Jermu Pollanen (skip)	(Latvia) Mārtiņš Trukšāns, Jānis Klīve, Sandris Buholcs, Artūrs Gerhards	€3,000	€1,200
2020	Not held			
2021	(Switzerland) Marco Hösli, Philipp Hösli, Marco Hefti, Justin Hausherr	(Finland) Kalle Kiiskinen, Teemu Salo, Leo Ouni, Paavo Kuosmanen	€3,000	€1,200
2022	(Scotland) Cameron Bryce, Duncan Menzies, Luke Carson, Robin McCall	(Netherlands) Wouter Gösgens, Jaap van Dorp, Laurens Hoekman, Tobias van den Hurk	€3,000	€1,200
2023	(Switzerland) Yves Stocker, Kim Schwaller, Felix Eberhard, Tom Winkelhausen	(Sweden) Fredrik Nyman, Patric Mabergs, Simon Olofsson, Johannes Patz	€3,000	€1,200
2024	(Sweden) Fredrik Nyman, Patric Mabergs, Simon Olofsson, Johannes Patz	(Norway) Andreas Hårstad, Mathias Brænden, Michael Mellemseter, Willhelm Næss	€3,000	€1,200
2025	(Sweden) Fredrik Nyman, Patric Mabergs, Simon Olofsson, Johannes Patz	(Switzerland) Max Winz (fourth), Jan Iseli (skip), Sandro Fanchini, Tom Winkelhausen	€6,000	€1,200
2026	(Norway) Lukas Høstmælingen, Tinius Nordbye, Magnus Lilleboe, Eskild Eriksen	(Norway) Magnus Ramsfjell, Steffen Walstad, Bendik Ramsfjell, Mathias Brænden	€6,000	€1,200
