= Prague Classic =

World Curling Tour event

- Established: 2018
- Host city: Prague, Czech Republic
- Arena: Curling Aréna Praha Roztyly
- Purse: €5,145
- 2026 champion: (Czech Republic) Lukáš Klíma

The Prague Classic is an annual tournament on the men's World Curling Tour. It is held annually in November at the Curling Aréna Praha Roztyly in Prague, Czech Republic.

The purse for the event is €5,145, with the winning team receiving €1,800.

The event has been held since 2018.

== Men's champions ==
Year	Winning team	Runner up team	Purse (€)	Winner's share (€)
2018	(Sweden) Cameron Bryce, Simon Granbom, Johannes Patz, Filip Stener	(Poland) Borys Jasiecki, Krzyszstof Domin, Bartosz Lobaza, Konrad Stych	€15,500	€5,000
2019	(Scotland) Ross Whyte, Robin Brydone, Duncan McFadzean, Euan Kyle	(Poland) Borys Jasiecki, Konrad Stych, Krzyszstof Domin, Bartosz Lobaza	€15,500	€5,000
2020	Cancelled			
2021	(Norway) Magnus Ramsfjell, Martin Sesaker, Bendik Ramsfjell, Gaute Nepstad	(South Korea) Lee Jeong-jae, Jeong Byeong-jin, Kim San, Kim Tae-hwan	€13,500	€4,500
2022	(Sweden) Fredrik Nyman, Patric Mabergs, Simon Olofsson, Johannes Patz	(Czech Republic) Lukáš Klíma, Marek Černovský, Radek Boháč, Martin Jurík	€13,500	€4,500
2023	(Czech Republic) Lukáš Klíma, Marek Černovský, Martin Jurík, Lukáš Klípa	(Turkey) Uğurcan Karagöz, Muhammet Demirel, Muhammed Zeki Uçan, Orhun Yüce	€13,500	€4,100
2024	(Sweden) Fredrik Nyman, Patric Mabergs, Simon Olofsson, Johannes Patz	(Czech Republic) Lukáš Klíma, Marek Černovský, Martin Jurík, Lukáš Klípa	€13,500	€4,100
2025	(Italy) Alberto Pimpini, Francesco Vigliani, Fabio Carlisano, Enrico Santopaolo	(Turkey) Uğurcan Karagöz, Muhammet Demirel, Selahattin Eșer, Serkan Karagöz	€13,500	€4,100
2026	(Czech Republic) Lukáš Klíma, Vít Chabičovský, Martin Jurík, Lukáš Klípa	(Austria) Mathias Genner, Jonas Backofen, Matthäus Hofer, Florian Mavec	€5,145	€1,800
