= Axel Sjöberg (curler) =

Swedish curler

- Curler
- Born: 11 June 1995 (age 31); Stockholm

Team
- Curling club: Sundbybergs CK, Sundbyberg
- Skip: Simon Granbom
- Third: Axel Sjöberg
- Second: Fabian Wingfors
- Lead: Jacob Hanna
- Mixed doubles partner: Fanny Sjöberg

Curling career
- Member Association: Sweden
- Other appearances: World Mixed Championship: 1 (2019), World Junior Championships: 2 (2012, 2016), Winter Universiade: 1 (2019)
Medal record
Curling
Swedish Men's Championship
Silver medal – second place	2017 Jönköping
Silver medal – second place	2019 Jönköping
Silver medal – second place	2024 Jönköping
Silver medal – second place	2025 Härnösand
Bronze medal – third place	2023 Karlstad
World Junior Championships
Silver medal – second place	2012 Östersund

Axel Nils Viktor Sjöberg (born 11 June 1995 in Stockholm) is a Swedish curler.

He is a 2019 Swedish mixed curling champion and played at the 2019 World Mixed Curling Championship.

== Teams ==
=== Men's ===
Season	Skip	Third	Second	Lead	Alternate	Coach	Events
2011–12	Rasmus Wranå	Jordan Wåhlin	Daniel Lövstrand	Axel Sjöberg	Patric Mabergs (WJCC)	Mats Wranå (WJCC)	SJCC 2012 (gold); WJCC 2012 (silver)
2012–13	Rasmus Wranå	Jordan Wåhlin	Daniel Lövstrand	Axel Sjöberg			
2013–14	Rasmus Wranå	Jordan Wåhlin	Axel Sjöberg	Daniel Lövstrand	Mats Wranå		
2014–15	Rasmus Wranå	Jordan Wåhlin	Axel Sjöberg	Daniel Lövstrand	Max Brooks		
2014–15	Daniel Lövstrand (fourth)	Rasmus Wranå (skip)	Max Bäck	Jordan Wåhlin	Axel Sjöberg	Mats Wranå	SMCC 2015 (5th)
2016	Rasmus Wranå	Fredrik Nyman	Jordan Wåhlin	Max Bäck	Axel Sjöberg	Mats Wranå	WJCC 2016 (6th)
2016–17	Johan Nygren	Fabian Wingfors	Emil Hermansson	Axel Sjöberg			SMCC 2017 (silver)
2018–19	Fredrik Nyman	Rasmus Wranå	Axel Sjöberg	Max Bäck		Olle Brudsten	WUG 2019 (5th)
2018–19	Fredrik Nyman	Axel Sjöberg	Max Bäck	Victor Martinsson		Olle Brudsten	SMCC 2019 (silver)

=== Mixed ===
Season	Skip	Third	Second	Lead	Alternate	Coach	Events
2014–15	Albin Barchéus	Jennie Wåhlin	Axel Sjöberg	Fanny Sjöberg		Jordan Wåhlin	SMxCC 2015 (9th)
2016–17	Emma Berg	Zandra Flyg	Axel Sjöberg	Fredrik Nyman			SMxCC 2017 (bronze)
2017–18	Tova Sundberg	Axel Sjöberg	Jennie Wåhlin	Niclas Johansson			SMxCC 2018 (silver)
2018–19	Simon Olofsson	Vilma Åhlström	Axel Sjöberg	Linda Stenlund	Hannes Lindquist	Hannes Lindquist	SMxCC 2019 (gold)
2019–20	Simon Olofsson	Vilma Åhlström	Axel Sjöberg	Linda Stenlund		Mathias Mabergs	WMxCC 2019 (9th)

=== Mixed doubles ===
Season	Male	Female	Events
2015–16	Axel Sjöberg	Johanna Heldin	SMDCC 2016 (4th)
2016–17	Axel Sjöberg	Johanna Heldin	SMDCC 2017 (5th)
2017–18	Axel Sjöberg	Sara Carlsson	SMDCC 2018 (7th)

== Personal life ==
Axel Sjöberg is from family of curlers: his father is Bernt Sjöberg, wheelchair curler, he is 2006 Winter Paralympics bronze medallist; his younger sister is Fanny Sjöberg, Swedish women's champion, she currently plays in Isabella Wranå's team.
