= 2024 World Mixed Curling Championship =

- Host city: Aberdeen, Scotland
- Arena: Curl Aberdeen
- Dates: 12–19 October
- Winner: Sweden
- Skip: Simon Granbom
- Third: Rebecka Thunman
- Second: Johannes Patz
- Lead: Mikaela Altebro
- Finalist: Japan (Hase)

The 2024 World Mixed Curling Championship was held from 12 to 19 October in Aberdeen, Scotland. The event marked the debut of Puerto Rico at a World Curling Championship, joining as a new member of World Curling in 2023.

== Teams ==
The teams are listed as follows:

Australia	Austria	Belgium	Brazil	Canada
Skip: Matt Panoussi; Third: Jennifer Westhagen; Second: Gerald Chick; Lead: Anne Powell	Skip: Johann Karg; Third: Johanna Höss; Second: Moritz Jöchl; Lead: Jill Witschen	Skip: Caro Van Oosterwyck; Third: Dirk Heylen; Second: Annemiek Huiskamp; Lead: Wim Van Doninck	Skip: Sergio Vilela; Third: Elen Sumi; Second: Arnaldo Yamashita; Lead: Giullia Rodrigues	Skip: Shaun Meachem; Third: Kelly Schafer; Second: Chris Haichert; Lead: Teejay Haichert
Chinese Taipei	Czech Republic	Denmark	England	Estonia
Skip: Hou Yi-ler; Third: Li Ling-zhi; Second: Lin Chen-han; Lead: Li Ling-yi	Skip: Kryštof Tabery; Third: Karolína Frederiksen; Second: Jakub Skála; Lead: Valentýna Dušková	Skip: Karolina Jensen; Third: Liam Goldbeck; Second: Signe Schack; Lead: Christian Karger	Skip: Andrew Woolston; Third: Lesley Gregory; Second: Martin Gregory; Lead: Kirsty Balfour	Fourth: Karl Kukner; Skip: Triin Madisson; Second: Marten Padama; Lead: Kaidi Elmik
Finland	Germany	Hong Kong	Hungary	India
Fourth: Paavo Kuosmanen; Third: Laura Kitti; Skip: Jussi Uusipaavalniemi; Lead: Bonnie Nilhamn-Kuosmanen	Skip: Sven Goldemann; Third: Maike Beer; Second: Peter Rickmers; Lead: Polina Ehnes	Skip: Jason Chang; Third: Ling-Yue Hung; Second: Ada Shang; Lead: Christopher Chung	Fourth: Balázs Fóti; Third: Csilla Halász; Skip: Gábor Ézsöl; Lead: Enikő Szabó	Skip: P.N. Raju; Third: Namini Chaudhari; Second: Girithar Anthay Suthakaran; Lead: Richa Patel
Ireland	Italy	Japan	Kazakhstan	Kenya
Skip: John Wilson; Third: Alison Fyfe; Second: Craig Whyte; Lead: Jen Ward	Fourth: Simone Gonin; Skip: Giorgia Maurino; Second: Lorenzo Maurino; Lead: Anna Maria Maurino	Fourth: Shun Ichitsubo; Skip: Hinako Hase; Second: Hiroki Hasegawa; Lead: Chihiro Tokoyoda	Skip: Abylaikhan Zhuzbay; Third: Tilsimay Alliyarova; Second: Aidos Alliyar; Lead: Merey Tastemir	Skip: Daniel Odhiambo; Third: Hanan Ali; Second: Simon Karanja; Lead: Laventer Oguta
Latvia	Netherlands	New Zealand	Nigeria	Norway
Skip: Kriss Vonda; Third: Agate Regža; Second: Ričards Vonda; Lead: Darta Regža	Skip: Simon Spits; Third: Lisenka Bomas; Second: Floris Ros; Lead: Anandi Bomas	Skip: Brett Sargon; Third: Holly Thompson; Second: Kieran Ford; Lead: Olivia Russell	Skip: Harold Woods III; Third: Jasmin Hashi; Second: T.J. Cole; Lead: Bobbie Todd	Skip: Martine Rønning; Third: Grunde Buraas; Second: Andrine Rønning; Lead: Harald Dæhlin
Philippines	Poland	Puerto Rico	Romania	Scotland
Skip: Chad Alojipan; Third: Donna Umali; Second: Alastair Onglingswan; Lead: Ashley Alojipan	Skip: Borys Jasiecki; Third: Julia Dyderska; Second: Jeremi Telak; Lead: Justyna Wojtas	Skip: Jonathan Vargas; Third: Rachel Conley; Second: Jose Sepulveda; Lead: Che Smith	Skip: Dan Ghergie; Third: Octavia Trăilă; Second: Matei Felecan; Lead: Ania Bacali	Skip: Neil Kennedy; Third: Margaret Agnew; Second: John Agnew; Lead: Sheila Kennedy
Slovakia	Slovenia	Spain	Sweden	Switzerland
Skip: Gabriela Kajanová; Third: Marek Sýkora; Second: Silvia Sýkorová; Lead: David Kajan	Skip: Gaber Bor Zelinka; Third: Liza Gregori; Second: Simon Langus; Lead: Lea Jere	Skip: Sergio Vez; Third: Oihane Otaegi; Second: Mikel Unanue; Lead: Leire Otaegi	Skip: Simon Granbom; Third: Rebecka Thunman; Second: Johannes Patz; Lead: Mikaela Altebro	Fourth: Yves Wagenseil; Skip: Nora Wüest; Second: Dieter Wüest; Lead: Marion Wüest
Turkey	Ukraine	United States	Wales	
Fourth: Selahattin Eser; Third: Nilay Arzık; Second: Bilal Emre Nerse; Skip: İlknur Ürüşan	Skip: Eduard Nikolov; Third: Yaroslava Kalinichenko; Second: Artem Suhak; Lead: Diana Moskalenko	Skip: David Falco; Third: Rebecca Wood; Second: Lance Wheeler; Lead: Clare Moores	Skip: Gary Coombs; Third: Laura Beever; Second: Rhys Phillips; Lead: Judith Glazier	

== Round robin standings ==
Final Round Robin Standings

Key
Teams to Playoffs

Group A	Skip	W	L	W–L	DSC
Canada	Shaun Meachem	7	0	–	53.04
Czech Republic	Kryštof Tabery	5	2	–	79.63
New Zealand	Brett Sargon	4	3	1–0	53.01
Hungary	Gábor Ézsöl	4	3	0–1	52.57
England	Andrew Woolston	3	4	1–0	127.84
Turkey	İlknur Ürüşan	3	4	0–1	56.84
Latvia	Kriss Vonda	2	5	–	79.05
Philippines	Chad Alojipan	0	7	–	104.19

Group B	Skip	W	L	W–L	DSC
Sweden	Simon Granbom	7	0	–	35.05
Poland	Borys Jasiecki	6	1	–	76.22
Italy	Giorgia Maurino	5	2	–	36.41
Ireland	John Wilson	4	3	–	66.36
Australia	Matt Panoussi	3	4	–	36.32
India	P.N. Raju	2	5	–	80.94
Nigeria	Harold Woods III	1	6	–	128.61
Puerto Rico	Jonathan Vargas	0	7	–	134.48

Group C	Skip	W	L	W–L	DSC
United States	David Falco	7	0	–	71.44
Spain	Sergio Vez	6	1	–	49.29
Slovenia	Gaber Bor Zelinka	5	2	–	55.13
Scotland	Neil Kennedy	4	3	–	47.95
Hong Kong	Jason Chang	3	4	–	103.70
Brazil	Sergio Mitsuo Vilela	2	5	–	124.43
Chinese Taipei	Hou Yi-Ler	1	6	–	119.32
Romania	Dan Ghergie	0	7	–	134.60

Group D	Skip	W	L	W–L	DSC
Norway	Martine Rønning	6	0	–	57.43
Japan	Hinako Hase	4	2	1–0	54.17
Netherlands	Simon Spits	4	2	0–1	69.98
Denmark	Karolina Jensen	3	3	–	56.35
Estonia	Triin Madisson	2	4	1–0	63.48
Austria	Johann Karg	2	4	0–1	99.86
Slovakia	Gabriela Kajanová	0	6	–	97.03

Group E	Skip	W	L	W–L	DSC
Switzerland	Nora Wüest	6	1	1–0	59.95
Kazakhstan	Abylaikhan Zhuzbay	6	1	0–1	80.64
Ukraine	Eduard Nikolov	5	2	–	53.78
Germany	Sven Goldemann	3	4	2–0	61.90
Finland	Jussi Uusipaavalniemi	3	4	1–1	58.19
Wales	Gary Coombs	3	4	0–2	95.87
Belgium	Caro Van Oosterwyck	2	5	–	106.12
Kenya	Daniel Odhiambo	0	7	–	147.00

Ranking of 4th Place Teams	Skip	Group	DSC
Scotland	Neil Kennedy	C	47.95
Hungary	Gábor Ézsöl	A	52.57
Denmark	Karolina Jensen	D	56.35
Germany	Sven Goldemann	E	61.90
Ireland	John Wilson	B	66.36

Group A Round Robin Summary Table
Pos.	Country	Canada	Czech Republic	England	Hungary	Latvia	New Zealand	Philippines	Türkiye	Record
1	Canada	—	10–2	9–3	6–2	19–1	8–5	15–1	9–7	7–0
2	Czech Republic	2–10	—	8–6	6–4	7–3	6–10	14–3	4–1	5–2
7	England	3–9	6–8	—	2–10	3–5	4–3	7–3	7–5	3–4
4	Hungary	2–6	4–6	10–2	—	9–3	1–6	11–1	7–5	4–3
6	Latvia	1–19	3–7	5–3	3–9	—	3–9	13–2	6–7	2–5
3	New Zealand	5–8	10–6	3–4	6–1	9–3	—	11–3	4–13	4–3
8	Philippines	1–15	3–14	3–7	1–11	2–13	3–11	—	2–11	0–7
5	Turkey	7–9	1–4	5–7	5–7	7–6	13–4	11–2	—	3–4

Group B Round Robin Summary Table
Pos.	Country	Australia	India		Italy	Nigeria	Poland	Puerto Rico	Sweden	Record
5	Australia	—	7–6	6–9	2–12	10–2	4–7	12–1	1–7	3–4
6	India	6–7	—	2–8	3–11	8–6	2–9	16–1	4–9	2–5
4	Ireland	9–6	8–2	—	1–9	9–1	5–7	19–1	5–8	4–3
3	Italy	12–2	11–3	9–1	—	12–2	2–8	17–2	5–6	5–2
7	Nigeria	2–10	6–8	1–9	2–12	—	1–10	8–4	2–12	1–6
2	Poland	7–4	9–2	7–5	8–2	10–1	—	15–1	5–8	6–1
8	Puerto Rico	1–12	1–16	1–19	2–17	4–8	1–15	—	1–16	0–7
1	Sweden	7–1	9–4	8–5	6–5	12–2	8–5	16–1	—	7–0

Group C Round Robin Summary Table
Pos.	Country	Brazil	Chinese Taipei	Hong Kong	Romania	Scotland	Slovenia	Spain	United States	Record
6	Brazil	—	7–4	2–11	8–2	3–12	4–9	1–11	3–10	2–5
7	Chinese Taipei	4–7	—	2–9	7–6	1–12	2–9	2–14	2–9	1–6
5	Hong Kong	11–2	9–2	—	6–2	2–7	6–8	2–9	2–7	3–4
8	Romania	2–8	6–7	2–6	—	2–6	1–13	0–14	1–9	0–7
4	Scotland	12–3	12–1	7–2	6–2	—	5–6	1–8	4–6	4–3
3	Slovenia	9–4	9–2	8–6	13–1	6–5	—	3–5	3–7	5–2
2	Spain	11–1	14–2	9–2	14–0	8–1	5–3	—	1–6	6–1
1	United States	10–3	9–2	7–2	9–1	6–4	7–3	6–1	—	7–0

Group D Round Robin Summary Table
Pos.	Country	Austria	Denmark	Estonia	Japan	Netherlands	Norway	Slovakia	Record
6	Austria	—	11–6	2–9	0–7	5–6	0–11	8–7	2–4
4	Denmark	6–11	—	7–5	7–6	5–7	2–7	9–3	3–3
5	Estonia	9–2	5–7	—	2–9	4–6	2–9	9–4	2–4
2	Japan	7–0	6–7	9–2	—	8–1	3–10	8–1	4–2
3	Netherlands	6–5	7–5	6–4	1–8	—	4–6	9–1	4–2
1	Norway	11–0	7–2	9–2	10–3	6–4	—	7–4	6–0
7	Slovakia	7–8	3–9	4–9	1–8	1–9	4–7	—	0–6

Group E Round Robin Summary Table
Pos.	Country	Belgium	Finland	Germany	Kazakhstan	Kenya	Switzerland	Ukraine	Wales	Record
7	Belgium	—	2–11	8–1	1–12	16–1	5–7	1–9	3–7	2–5
5	Finland	11–2	—	3–9	4–5	11–1	7–8	5–7	12–2	3–4
4	Germany	1–8	9–3	—	3–11	11–2	5–12	4–7	8–5	3–4
2	Kazakhstan	12–1	5–4	11–3	—	15–2	4–6	8–7	10–3	6–1
8	Kenya	1–16	1–11	2–11	2–15	—	0–19	1–14	1–15	0–7
1	Switzerland	7–5	8–7	12–5	6–4	19–0	—	7–6	4–9	6–1
3	Ukraine	9–1	7–5	7–4	7–8	14–1	6–7	—	10–4	5–2
6	Wales	7–3	2–12	5–8	3–10	15–1	9–4	4–10	—	3–4

== Round robin results ==
All draw times are listed in British Summer Time (UTC+01:00).

=== Draw 1 ===
Saturday, October 12, 8:00 am

Sheet A	1	2	3	4	5	6	7	8	Final
Hong Kong (Chang)	0	1	0	3	0	0	2	0	6
Slovenia (Zelinka)	1	0	2	0	2	1	0	2	8

Sheet C	1	2	3	4	5	6	7	8	9	Final
Turkey (Ürüşan)	1	1	0	1	0	3	1	0	0	7
Canada (Meachem)	0	0	2	0	1	0	0	4	2	9

Sheet E	1	2	3	4	5	6	7	8	Final
Latvia (Vonda)	0	0	1	1	0	1	0	2	5
England (Woolston)	0	3	0	0	0	0	0	0	3

Sheet B	1	2	3	4	5	6	7	8	Final
Hungary (Ézsöl)	0	0	1	0	0	0	0	X	1
New Zealand (Sargon)	0	0	0	1	2	2	1	X	6

Sheet D	1	2	3	4	5	6	7	8	Final
Czech Republic (Tabery)	4	1	0	4	4	0	1	X	14
Philippines (Alojipan)	0	0	1	0	0	2	0	X	3

Sheet F	1	2	3	4	5	6	7	8	Final
Chinese Taipei (Hou)	0	0	1	0	1	0	X	X	2
Spain (Vez)	3	3	0	5	0	3	X	X	14

=== Draw 2 ===
Saturday, October 12, 12:00 pm

Sheet A	1	2	3	4	5	6	7	8	Final
Denmark (Jensen)	0	4	0	1	0	0	2	0	7
Estonia (Madisson)	0	0	1	0	1	2	0	1	5

Sheet D	1	2	3	4	5	6	7	8	Final
Finland (Uusipaavalniemi)	2	0	0	1	1	0	0	0	4
Kazakhstan (Zhuzbay)	0	1	1	0	0	1	1	1	5

Sheet F	1	2	3	4	5	6	7	8	Final
Germany (Goldemann)	0	1	0	0	0	0	X	X	1
Belgium (Van Oosterwyck)	1	0	2	2	1	2	X	X	8

Sheet C	1	2	3	4	5	6	7	8	Final
Nigeria (Woods)	2	0	3	0	1	0	0	X	5
India (Raju)	0	4	0	1	0	1	2	X	7

Sheet E	1	2	3	4	5	6	7	8	Final
Kenya (Odhiambo)	0	0	0	0	0	0	X	X	0
Switzerland (Wüest)	5	4	3	3	3	1	X	X	19

=== Draw 3 ===
Saturday, October 12, 4:00 pm

Sheet A	1	2	3	4	5	6	7	8	Final
Scotland (Kennedy)	0	1	1	1	1	2	0	X	6
Romania (Ghergie)	1	0	0	0	0	0	1	X	2

Sheet C	1	2	3	4	5	6	7	8	Final
Netherlands (Spits)	0	0	0	0	0	1	X	X	1
Japan (Hase)	1	0	2	3	2	0	X	X	8

Sheet E	1	2	3	4	5	6	7	8	Final
Puerto Rico (Vargas)	0	0	0	1	0	0	X	X	1
Ireland (Wilson)	6	2	5	0	2	4	X	X	19

Sheet B	1	2	3	4	5	6	7	8	9	Final
Sweden (Granbom)	1	0	1	0	1	1	1	0	1	6
Italy (Maurino)	0	1	0	2	0	0	0	2	0	5

Sheet D	1	2	3	4	5	6	7	8	Final
Poland (Jasiecki)	0	0	2	0	3	0	0	2	7
Australia (Panoussi)	1	0	0	1	0	1	1	0	4

Sheet F	1	2	3	4	5	6	7	8	Final
Brazil (Vilela)	0	1	0	0	0	2	X	X	3
United States (Falco)	3	0	5	1	1	0	X	X	10

=== Draw 4 ===
Saturday, October 12, 8:30 pm

Sheet A	1	2	3	4	5	6	7	8	Final
Switzerland (Wüest)	0	1	0	0	3	2	0	X	6
Kazakhstan (Zhuzbay)	0	0	2	1	0	0	1	X	4

Sheet C	1	2	3	4	5	6	7	8	Final
Germany (Goldemann)	0	4	3	1	3	0	X	X	11
Kenya (Odhiambo)	1	0	0	0	0	1	X	X	2

Sheet E	1	2	3	4	5	6	7	8	9	Final
Slovakia (Kajanová)	0	5	0	0	2	0	0	0	0	7
Austria (Karg)	0	0	1	2	0	1	1	2	1	8

Sheet B	1	2	3	4	5	6	7	8	Final
Wales (Coombs)	1	0	0	2	0	1	0	0	4
Ukraine (Nikolov)	0	2	1	0	3	0	1	3	10

Sheet D	1	2	3	4	5	6	7	8	Final
Estonia (Madisson)	1	0	0	0	1	0	0	X	2
Norway (Rønning)	0	2	2	1	0	1	3	X	9

=== Draw 5 ===
Sunday, October 13, 8:00 am

Sheet A	1	2	3	4	5	6	7	8	Final
Ireland (Wilson)	2	1	1	0	3	1	1	X	9
Nigeria (Woods)	0	0	0	1	0	0	0	X	1

Sheet C	1	2	3	4	5	6	7	8	Final
Scotland (Kennedy)	0	2	1	3	0	1	0	X	7
Hong Kong (Chang)	0	0	0	0	1	0	1	X	2

Sheet E	1	2	3	4	5	6	7	8	Final
United States (Falco)	2	2	1	3	1	0	X	X	9
Romania (Ghergie)	0	0	0	0	0	1	X	X	1

Sheet B	1	2	3	4	5	6	7	8	Final
Australia (Panoussi)	4	1	2	1	4	0	X	X	12
Puerto Rico (Vargas)	0	0	0	0	0	1	X	X	1

Sheet D	1	2	3	4	5	6	7	8	Final
India (Raju)	0	0	2	0	2	0	X	X	4
Sweden (Granbom)	2	3	0	2	0	2	X	X	9

Sheet F	1	2	3	4	5	6	7	8	Final
Italy (Maurino)	1	0	0	1	0	0	X	X	2
Poland (Jasiecki)	0	4	1	0	2	1	X	X	8

=== Draw 6 ===
Sunday, October 13, 12:00 pm

Sheet A	1	2	3	4	5	6	7	8	Final
England (Woolston)	1	0	0	2	0	2	2	X	7
Philippines (Alojipan)	0	1	1	0	1	0	0	X	3

Sheet C	1	2	3	4	5	6	7	8	Final
Chinese Taipei (Hou)	1	1	0	0	0	2	0	X	4
Brazil (Vilela)	0	0	2	2	1	0	2	X	7

Sheet E	1	2	3	4	5	6	7	8	Final
New Zealand (Sargon)	0	0	1	2	3	0	2	2	10
Czech Republic (Tabery)	3	0	0	0	0	3	0	0	6

Sheet B	1	2	3	4	5	6	7	8	Final
Slovenia (Zelinka)	0	0	2	0	0	1	0	0	3
Spain (Vez)	0	1	0	2	0	0	1	1	5

Sheet D	1	2	3	4	5	6	7	8	Final
Latvia (Vonda)	0	0	0	0	1	0	X	X	1
Canada (Meachem)	4	1	2	6	0	6	X	X	19

Sheet F	1	2	3	4	5	6	7	8	Final
Turkey (Ürüşan)	3	0	0	1	0	0	1	X	5
Hungary (Ézsöl)	0	3	1	0	2	1	0	X	7

=== Draw 7 ===
Sunday, October 13, 4:00 pm

Sheet B	1	2	3	4	5	6	7	8	Final
Denmark (Jensen)	0	2	0	3	0	0	1	X	6
Austria (Karg)	1	0	2	0	3	5	0	X	11

Sheet D	1	2	3	4	5	6	7	8	Final
Kazakhstan (Zhuzbay)	3	0	4	3	5	0	X	X	15
Kenya (Odhiambo)	0	1	0	0	0	1	X	X	2

Sheet F	1	2	3	4	5	6	7	8	Final
Switzerland (Wüest)	0	0	1	0	3	0	4	0	8
Finland (Uusipaavalniemi)	0	2	0	3	0	1	0	1	7

Sheet C	1	2	3	4	5	6	7	8	Final
Estonia (Madisson)	3	0	0	3	0	2	1	X	9
Slovakia (Kajanová)	0	2	0	0	2	0	0	X	4

Sheet E	1	2	3	4	5	6	7	8	Final
Belgium (Van Oosterwyck)	0	0	1	0	0	0	X	X	1
Ukraine (Nikolov)	4	1	0	1	1	2	X	X	9

=== Draw 8 ===
Sunday, October 13, 8:00 pm

Sheet A	1	2	3	4	5	6	7	8	Final
Poland (Jasiecki)	0	2	0	1	0	0	2	X	5
Sweden (Granbom)	1	0	3	0	3	1	0	X	8

Sheet C	1	2	3	4	5	6	7	8	Final
Japan (Hase)	0	1	0	1	1	0	0	X	3
Norway (Rønning)	2	0	5	0	0	1	2	X	10

Sheet E	1	2	3	4	5	6	7	8	Final
Ireland (Wilson)	0	3	3	0	3	0	0	X	9
Australia (Panoussi)	2	0	0	1	0	1	2	X	6

Sheet B	1	2	3	4	5	6	7	8	Final
Italy (Maurino)	0	3	0	3	5	0	X	X	11
India (Raju)	1	0	1	0	0	1	X	X	3

Sheet D	1	2	3	4	5	6	7	8	Final
Germany (Goldemann)	2	0	3	0	1	0	0	2	8
Wales (Coombs)	0	2	0	2	0	1	0	0	5

Sheet F	1	2	3	4	5	6	7	8	Final
Nigeria (Woods)	2	0	1	0	0	4	1	X	8
Puerto Rico (Vargas)	0	1	0	2	1	0	0	X	4

=== Draw 9 ===
Monday, October 14, 8:00 am

Sheet A	1	2	3	4	5	6	7	8	Final
Brazil (Vilela)	0	0	0	0	1	0	X	X	1
Spain (Vez)	3	1	3	2	0	2	X	X	11

Sheet C	1	2	3	4	5	6	7	8	Final
Slovenia (Zelinka)	0	0	1	0	0	2	0	X	3
United States (Falco)	1	1	0	3	1	0	1	X	7

Sheet B	1	2	3	4	5	6	7	8	Final
Belgium (Van Oosterwyck)	0	1	0	1	0	0	X	X	2
Finland (Uusipaavalniemi)	4	0	3	0	3	1	X	X	11

Sheet D	1	2	3	4	5	6	7	8	Final
Scotland (Kennedy)	2	0	2	5	3	0	X	X	12
Chinese Taipei (Hou)	0	0	0	0	0	1	X	X	1

=== Draw 10 ===
Monday, October 14, 12:00 pm

Sheet A	1	2	3	4	5	6	7	8	Final
Norway (Rønning)	0	3	0	2	1	1	0	X	7
Slovakia (Kajanová)	1	0	1	0	0	0	2	X	4

Sheet C	1	2	3	4	5	6	7	8	Final
Ukraine (Nikolov)	1	0	0	3	0	1	0	1	6
Switzerland (Wüest)	0	2	1	0	2	0	2	0	7

Sheet E	1	2	3	4	5	6	7	8	Final
Kazakhstan (Zhuzbay)	2	0	3	0	3	1	2	X	11
Germany (Goldemann)	0	1	0	2	0	0	0	X	3

Sheet B	1	2	3	4	5	6	7	8	Final
Japan (Hase)	2	0	0	0	2	3	2	X	9
Estonia (Madisson)	0	0	1	1	0	0	0	X	2

Sheet D	1	2	3	4	5	6	7	8	Final
Denmark (Jensen)	0	1	0	3	0	0	1	X	5
Netherlands (Spits)	2	0	3	0	1	1	0	X	7

Sheet F	1	2	3	4	5	6	7	8	Final
Kenya (Odhiambo)	0	0	1	0	0	0	X	X	1
Wales (Coombs)	2	3	0	6	1	3	X	X	15

=== Draw 11 ===
Monday, October 14, 4:00 pm

Sheet A	1	2	3	4	5	6	7	8	Final
Hungary (Ézsöl)	0	0	0	0	2	0	0	X	2
Canada (Meachem)	0	0	2	1	0	0	3	X	6

Sheet C	1	2	3	4	5	6	7	8	Final
Latvia (Vonda)	0	3	0	0	1	0	0	2	6
Turkey (Ürüşan)	2	0	1	1	0	2	1	0	7

Sheet E	1	2	3	4	5	6	7	8	Final
Hong Kong (Chang)	0	0	0	1	0	0	1	X	2
Spain (Vez)	0	6	1	0	2	0	0	X	9

Sheet B	1	2	3	4	5	6	7	8	Final
Brazil (Vilela)	3	0	1	0	1	2	1	X	8
Romania (Ghergie)	0	1	0	1	0	0	0	X	2

Sheet D	1	2	3	4	5	6	7	8	Final
Philippines (Alojipan)	0	1	0	0	1	1	0	X	3
New Zealand (Sargon)	2	0	4	1	0	0	4	X	11

Sheet F	1	2	3	4	5	6	7	8	Final
Czech Republic (Tabery)	0	2	3	0	0	2	0	1	8
England (Woolston)	3	0	0	0	1	0	2	0	6

=== Draw 12 ===
Monday, October 14, 8:00 pm

Sheet A	1	2	3	4	5	6	7	8	Final
Slovenia (Zelinka)	0	0	0	3	0	1	1	1	6
Scotland (Kennedy)	1	0	1	0	3	0	0	0	5

Sheet C	1	2	3	4	5	6	7	8	9	Final
India (Raju)	0	2	1	0	2	0	0	1	0	6
Australia (Panoussi)	2	0	0	2	0	0	2	0	1	7

Sheet E	1	2	3	4	5	6	7	8	Final
Sweden (Granbom)	3	1	0	3	6	3	X	X	16
Puerto Rico (Vargas)	0	0	1	0	0	0	X	X	1

Sheet B	1	2	3	4	5	6	7	8	Final
Nigeria (Woods)	0	0	0	0	0	1	X	X	1
Poland (Jasiecki)	3	2	2	2	1	0	X	X	10

Sheet D	1	2	3	4	5	6	7	8	Final
Ireland (Wilson)	0	0	1	0	0	0	0	X	1
Italy (Maurino)	3	1	0	0	2	1	2	X	9

Sheet F	1	2	3	4	5	6	7	8	Final
United States (Falco)	1	4	0	3	1	0	X	X	9
Chinese Taipei (Hou)	0	0	1	0	0	1	X	X	2

=== Draw 13 ===
Tuesday, October 15, 8:00 am

Sheet A	1	2	3	4	5	6	7	8	Final
Germany (Goldemann)	0	0	1	2	0	1	0	0	4
Ukraine (Nikolov)	1	3	0	0	2	0	0	1	7

Sheet F	1	2	3	4	5	6	7	8	Final
Wales (Coombs)	0	0	1	1	0	1	X	X	3
Kazakhstan (Zhuzbay)	1	5	0	0	4	0	X	X	10

Sheet C	1	2	3	4	5	6	7	8	Final
Austria (Karg)	0	1	0	1	1	0	2	0	5
Netherlands (Spits)	2	0	1	0	0	2	0	1	6

=== Draw 14 ===
Tuesday, October 15, 12:00 pm

Sheet A	1	2	3	4	5	6	7	8	Final
Australia (Panoussi)	0	0	1	0	1	0	X	X	2
Italy (Maurino)	2	2	0	4	0	4	X	X	12

Sheet C	1	2	3	4	5	6	7	8	Final
Sweden (Granbom)	4	0	3	1	0	3	1	X	12
Nigeria (Woods)	0	1	0	0	1	0	0	X	2

Sheet E	1	2	3	4	5	6	7	8	Final
Chinese Taipei (Hou)	0	0	1	0	1	0	X	X	2
Slovenia (Zelinka)	5	1	0	2	0	1	X	X	9

Sheet B	1	2	3	4	5	6	7	8	Final
Scotland (Kennedy)	1	0	0	1	0	1	0	1	4
United States (Falco)	0	1	1	0	2	0	2	0	6

Sheet D	1	2	3	4	5	6	7	8	Final
Puerto Rico (Vargas)	0	1	0	0	0	0	0	X	1
Poland (Jasiecki)	1	0	3	3	2	3	3	X	15

Sheet F	1	2	3	4	5	6	7	8	Final
India (Raju)	0	0	1	0	1	0	X	X	2
Ireland (Wilson)	2	4	0	1	0	1	X	X	8

=== Draw 15 ===
Tuesday, October 15, 4:00 pm

Sheet A	1	2	3	4	5	6	7	8	Final
Slovakia (Kajanová)	0	1	0	0	0	0	X	X	1
Japan (Hase)	2	0	2	2	0	2	X	X	8

Sheet C	1	2	3	4	5	6	7	8	Final
Switzerland (Wüest)	0	0	2	1	0	1	0	0	4
Wales (Coombs)	2	0	0	0	2	0	1	4	9

Sheet E	1	2	3	4	5	6	7	8	Final
Norway (Rønning)	0	1	1	4	0	1	0	X	7
Denmark (Jensen)	0	0	0	0	2	0	0	X	2

Sheet B	1	2	3	4	5	6	7	8	Final
Kenya (Odhiambo)	1	0	0	0	0	0	X	X	1
Belgium (Van Oosterwyck)	0	4	4	3	3	2	X	X	16

Sheet D	1	2	3	4	5	6	7	8	Final
Ukraine (Nikolov)	2	1	0	1	0	1	1	1	7
Finland (Uusipaavalniemi)	0	0	1	0	4	0	0	0	5

Sheet F	1	2	3	4	5	6	7	8	Final
Philippines (Alojipan)	0	0	0	0	2	0	0	X	2
Latvia (Vonda)	3	3	2	2	0	2	1	X	13

=== Draw 16 ===
Tuesday, October 15, 8:00 pm

Sheet A	1	2	3	4	5	6	7	8	Final
New Zealand (Sargon)	1	0	2	0	0	1	X	X	4
Turkey (Ürüşan)	0	6	0	4	3	0	X	X	13

Sheet C	1	2	3	4	5	6	7	8	Final
Spain (Vez)	1	3	4	1	2	3	X	X	14
Romania (Ghergie)	0	0	0	0	0	0	X	X	0

Sheet E	1	2	3	4	5	6	7	8	Final
England (Woolston)	1	0	1	0	1	0	X	X	3
Canada (Meachem)	0	2	0	3	0	4	X	X	9

Sheet B	1	2	3	4	5	6	7	8	Final
Czech Republic (Tabery)	0	1	0	0	3	1	0	1	6
Hungary (Ézsöl)	1	0	1	1	0	0	1	0	4

Sheet D	1	2	3	4	5	6	7	8	Final
Hong Kong (Chang)	5	0	3	0	2	1	X	X	11
Brazil (Vilela)	0	1	0	1	0	0	X	X	2

Sheet F	1	2	3	4	5	6	7	8	Final
Estonia (Madisson)	0	2	0	4	2	1	X	X	9
Austria (Karg)	0	0	2	0	0	0	X	X	2

=== Draw 17 ===
Wednesday, October 16, 8:00 am

Sheet A	1	2	3	4	5	6	7	8	Final
Kenya (Odhiambo)	1	0	0	0	0	0	X	X	1
Finland (Uusipaavalniemi)	0	0	2	3	2	4	X	X	11

Sheet C	1	2	3	4	5	6	7	8	Final
Italy (Maurino)	4	0	4	5	4	0	X	X	17
Puerto Rico (Vargas)	0	1	0	0	0	1	X	X	2

Sheet E	1	2	3	4	5	6	7	8	Final
India (Raju)	0	0	1	0	0	1	0	X	2
Poland (Jasiecki)	1	0	0	1	3	0	4	X	9

Sheet B	1	2	3	4	5	6	7	8	Final
Ireland (Wilson)	0	2	0	2	0	0	1	X	5
Sweden (Granbom)	1	0	5	0	0	2	0	X	8

Sheet D	1	2	3	4	5	6	7	8	Final
Australia (Panoussi)	2	1	0	3	0	2	2	X	10
Nigeria (Woods)	0	0	1	0	1	0	0	X	2

Sheet F	1	2	3	4	5	6	7	8	Final
Norway (Rønning)	1	0	1	1	0	3	0	X	6
Netherlands (Spits)	0	1	0	0	2	0	1	X	4

=== Draw 18 ===
Wednesday, October 16, 12:00 pm

Sheet A	1	2	3	4	5	6	7	8	Final
Wales (Coombs)	1	0	1	0	2	0	3	X	7
Belgium (Van Oosterwyck)	0	1	0	2	0	0	0	X	3

Sheet C	1	2	3	4	5	6	7	8	Final
Canada (Meachem)	2	0	0	2	4	2	X	X	10
Czech Republic (Tabery)	0	1	1	0	0	0	X	X	2

Sheet E	1	2	3	4	5	6	7	8	Final
Turkey (Ürüşan)	0	2	3	0	2	1	3	X	11
Philippines (Alojipan)	1	0	0	1	0	0	0	X	2

Sheet B	1	2	3	4	5	6	7	8	Final
New Zealand (Sargon)	1	0	2	3	2	0	1	X	9
Latvia (Vonda)	0	1	0	0	0	2	0	X	3

Sheet D	1	2	3	4	5	6	7	8	Final
Hungary (Ézsöl)	1	1	0	4	4	0	X	X	10
England (Woolston)	0	0	1	0	0	1	X	X	2

Sheet F	1	2	3	4	5	6	7	8	Final
Slovakia (Kajanová)	0	1	1	0	1	0	X	X	3
Denmark (Jensen)	4	0	0	2	0	3	X	X	9

=== Draw 19 ===
Wednesday, October 16, 4:00 pm

Sheet A	1	2	3	4	5	6	7	8	Final
Romania (Ghergie)	3	1	1	0	0	1	0	0	6
Chinese Taipei (Hou)	0	0	0	2	1	0	3	1	7

Sheet C	1	2	3	4	5	6	7	8	Final
Finland (Uusipaavalniemi)	2	0	0	0	1	0	0	X	3
Germany (Goldemann)	0	1	1	1	0	2	4	X	9

Sheet E	1	2	3	4	5	6	7	8	Final
Austria (Karg)	0	0	0	0	0	0	X	X	0
Japan (Hase)	2	1	1	1	1	1	X	X	7

Sheet B	1	2	3	4	5	6	7	8	Final
Ukraine (Nikolov)	0	0	1	0	3	0	3	0	7
Kazakhstan (Zhuzbay)	3	0	0	2	0	1	0	2	8

Sheet D	1	2	3	4	5	6	7	8	Final
Netherlands (Spits)	0	0	2	0	3	0	1	X	6
Estonia (Madisson)	1	1	0	1	0	1	0	X	4

Sheet F	1	2	3	4	5	6	7	8	Final
Slovenia (Zelinka)	2	0	2	0	1	0	1	3	9
Brazil (Vilela)	0	1	0	1	0	2	0	0	4

=== Draw 20 ===
Wednesday, October 16, 8:00 pm

Sheet A	1	2	3	4	5	6	7	8	Final
United States (Falco)	0	0	0	2	3	0	2	X	7
Hong Kong (Chang)	0	0	1	0	0	1	0	X	2

Sheet D	1	2	3	4	5	6	7	8	Final
Belgium (Van Oosterwyck)	0	0	2	0	1	0	2	0	5
Switzerland (Wüest)	0	3	0	0	0	1	0	3	7

Sheet F	1	2	3	4	5	6	7	8	Final
Spain (Vez)	0	0	2	0	1	1	4	X	8
Scotland (Kennedy)	0	1	0	0	0	0	0	X	1

Sheet B	1	2	3	4	5	6	7	8	Final
Canada (Meachem)	2	3	0	2	1	4	3	X	15
Philippines (Alojipan)	0	0	1	0	0	0	0	X	1

Sheet E	1	2	3	4	5	6	7	8	Final
Hungary (Ézsöl)	1	0	3	2	2	0	1	X	9
Latvia (Vonda)	0	1	0	0	0	2	0	X	3

=== Draw 21 ===
Thursday, October 17, 8:00 am

Sheet B	1	2	3	4	5	6	7	8	Final
Netherlands (Spits)	1	1	0	3	2	2	X	X	9
Slovakia (Kajanová)	0	0	1	0	0	0	X	X	1

Sheet D	1	2	3	4	5	6	7	8	Final
Turkey (Ürüşan)	0	0	0	1	0	0	0	X	1
Czech Republic (Tabery)	0	0	0	0	1	1	2	X	4

Sheet F	1	2	3	4	5	6	7	8	Final
Sweden (Granbom)	1	1	1	0	1	1	2	X	7
Australia (Panoussi)	0	0	0	1	0	0	0	X	1

Sheet C	1	2	3	4	5	6	7	8	Final
New Zealand (Sargon)	0	1	0	1	0	0	1	0	3
England (Woolston)	0	0	1	0	0	2	0	1	4

Sheet E	1	2	3	4	5	6	7	8	Final
Finland (Uusipaavalniemi)	2	1	5	0	4	0	X	X	12
Wales (Coombs)	0	0	0	1	0	1	X	X	2

=== Draw 22 ===
Thursday, October 17, 12:00 pm

Sheet A	1	2	3	4	5	6	7	8	Final
Puerto Rico (Vargas)	0	0	0	0	1	0	X	X	1
India (Raju)	3	4	3	2	0	4	X	X	16

Sheet C	1	2	3	4	5	6	7	8	Final
Poland (Jasiecki)	1	1	1	0	3	0	1	0	7
Ireland (Wilson)	0	0	0	2	0	2	0	1	5

Sheet E	1	2	3	4	5	6	7	8	Final
Nigeria (Woods)	0	1	0	0	1	0	X	X	2
Italy (Maurino)	2	0	2	3	0	5	X	X	12

Sheet B	1	2	3	4	5	6	7	8	Final
Switzerland (Wüest)	4	3	0	4	0	1	X	X	12
Germany (Goldemann)	0	0	3	0	2	0	X	X	5

Sheet D	1	2	3	4	5	6	7	8	9	Final
Japan (Hase)	0	2	0	0	1	0	0	3	0	6
Denmark (Jensen)	1	0	1	1	0	2	1	0	1	7

Sheet F	1	2	3	4	5	6	7	8	Final
Romania (Ghergie)	1	0	0	1	0	0	0	0	2
Hong Kong (Chang)	0	1	1	0	1	1	1	1	6

=== Draw 23 ===
Thursday, October 17, 4:00 pm

Sheet A	1	2	3	4	5	6	7	8	Final
Austria (Karg)	0	0	0	0	0	0	X	X	0
Norway (Rønning)	2	1	1	1	3	3	X	X	11

Sheet C	1	2	3	4	5	6	7	8	Final
Philippines (Alojipan)	0	0	0	1	0	0	0	X	1
Hungary (Ézsöl)	3	2	1	0	1	1	3	X	11

Sheet F	1	2	3	4	5	6	7	8	Final
Ukraine (Nikolov)	4	1	4	4	1	0	X	X	14
Kenya (Odhiambo)	0	0	0	0	0	1	X	X	1

Sheet B	1	2	3	4	5	6	7	8	Final
England (Woolston)	0	2	0	1	0	0	3	1	7
Turkey (Ürüşan)	1	0	2	0	0	2	0	0	5

Sheet D	1	2	3	4	5	6	7	8	Final
Spain (Vez)	0	0	0	0	0	1	X	X	1
United States (Falco)	0	2	2	1	1	0	X	X	6

=== Draw 24 ===
Thursday, October 17, 8:00 pm

Sheet A	1	2	3	4	5	6	7	8	Final
Czech Republic (Tabery)	1	0	0	3	0	0	1	2	7
Latvia (Vonda)	0	1	0	0	1	1	0	0	3

Sheet C	1	2	3	4	5	6	7	8	Final
Kazakhstan (Zhuzbay)	1	1	2	4	4	0	X	X	12
Belgium (Van Oosterwyck)	0	0	0	0	0	1	X	X	1

Sheet E	1	2	3	4	5	6	7	8	Final
Brazil (Vilela)	0	1	0	0	0	2	X	X	3
Scotland (Kennedy)	2	0	5	3	2	0	X	X	12

Sheet B	1	2	3	4	5	6	7	8	Final
Hong Kong (Chang)	2	2	0	2	2	1	0	X	9
Chinese Taipei (Hou)	0	1	0	0	0	0	1	X	2

Sheet D	1	2	3	4	5	6	7	8	Final
Romania (Ghergie)	0	0	0	1	0	0	X	X	1
Slovenia (Zelinka)	3	2	3	0	4	1	X	X	13

Sheet F	1	2	3	4	5	6	7	8	Final
Canada (Meachem)	2	0	2	0	1	0	3	X	8
New Zealand (Sargon)	0	1	0	2	0	2	0	X	5

== Playoffs ==
Round of 16
1	Sweden	4
16	Scotland	2
8	Poland	9
9	Czech Republic	3
5	United States	6
12	New Zealand	1
4	Switzerland	6
13	Ukraine	3
3	Norway	6
14	Slovenia	4
6	Spain	8
11	Italy	6
7	Japan	8
10	Kazakhstan	5
2	Canada	4
15	Netherlands	6

Quarterfinals
1	Sweden	9
8	Poland	6
5	United States	2
4	Switzerland	5
3	Norway	3
6	Spain	5
7	Japan	8
15	Netherlands	3

Semifinals
1	Sweden	6
4	Switzerland	4
6	Spain	4
7	Japan	9

Gold medal game
1	Sweden	5
7	Japan	4
Bronze medal game
4	Switzerland	4
6	Spain	2

=== Round of 16 ===
Friday, October 18, 9:00 am

Sheet B	1	2	3	4	5	6	7	8	Final
Poland (Jasiecki)	3	1	4	0	0	1	X	X	9
Czech Republic (Tabery)	0	0	0	1	2	0	X	X	3

Sheet C	1	2	3	4	5	6	7	8	Final
Switzerland (Wüest)	0	0	0	1	1	2	2	X	6
Ukraine (Nikolov)	2	0	1	0	0	0	0	X	3

Sheet D	1	2	3	4	5	6	7	8	Final
United States (Falco)	1	1	1	2	1	0	X	X	6
New Zealand (Sargon)	0	0	0	0	0	1	X	X	1

Sheet E	1	2	3	4	5	6	7	8	Final
Sweden (Granbom)	1	0	0	1	1	0	1	X	4
Scotland (Kennedy)	0	1	0	0	0	1	0	X	2

Friday, October 18, 1:00 pm

Sheet B	1	2	3	4	5	6	7	8	Final
Japan (Hase)	2	2	0	0	3	1	0	X	8
Kazakhstan (Zhuzbay)	0	0	1	2	0	0	2	X	5

Sheet C	1	2	3	4	5	6	7	8	Final
Spain (Vez)	0	2	0	2	0	3	0	1	8
Italy (Maurino)	1	0	1	0	2	0	2	0	6

Sheet D	1	2	3	4	5	6	7	8	9	Final
Canada (Meachem)	1	0	1	0	1	0	1	0	0	4
Netherlands (Spits)	0	1	0	1	0	1	0	1	2	6

Sheet E	1	2	3	4	5	6	7	8	Final
Norway (Rønning)	2	0	0	1	0	2	0	1	6
Slovenia (Zelinka)	0	0	2	0	1	0	1	0	4

=== Quarterfinals ===
Friday, October 18, 7:00 pm

Sheet B	1	2	3	4	5	6	7	8	Final
Norway (Rønning)	0	0	1	0	0	2	0	0	3
Spain (Vez)	0	1	0	1	0	0	1	2	5

Sheet C	1	2	3	4	5	6	7	8	Final
Japan (Hase)	1	0	4	1	2	0	0	X	8
Netherlands (Spits)	0	1	0	0	0	1	1	X	3

Sheet D	1	2	3	4	5	6	7	8	Final
Sweden (Granbom)	2	1	0	3	0	2	0	1	9
Poland (Jasiecki)	0	0	2	0	3	0	1	0	6

Sheet E	1	2	3	4	5	6	7	8	Final
United States (Falco)	0	0	1	0	1	0	0	X	2
Switzerland (Wüest)	0	0	0	2	0	2	1	X	5

=== Semifinals ===
Saturday, October 19, 9:00 am

Sheet B	1	2	3	4	5	6	7	8	Final
Sweden (Granbom)	2	0	1	1	0	1	0	1	6
Switzerland (Wüest)	0	1	0	0	1	0	2	0	4

Sheet E	1	2	3	4	5	6	7	8	Final
Spain (Vez)	3	0	0	1	0	0	0	X	4
Japan (Hase)	0	1	2	0	2	1	3	X	9

=== Bronze medal game ===
Saturday, October 19, 3:00 pm

Sheet C	1	2	3	4	5	6	7	8	Final
Switzerland (Wüest)	0	0	0	0	2	0	1	1	4
Spain (Vez)	0	0	1	0	0	1	0	0	2

=== Gold medal game ===
Saturday, October 19, 3:00 pm

Sheet D	1	2	3	4	5	6	7	8	Final
Sweden (Granbom)	0	1	1	1	0	1	0	1	5
Japan (Hase)	1	0	0	0	1	0	2	0	4

== Final standings ==
Place	Team
1st place, gold medalist(s)	Sweden
2nd place, silver medalist(s)	Japan
3rd place, bronze medalist(s)	Switzerland
4	Spain
5	Netherlands
5	Norway
5	Poland
5	United States
9	Canada
9	Czech Republic
9	Italy
9	Kazakhstan
9	New Zealand
9	Scotland
9	Slovenia
9	Ukraine

Place	Team
17	Hungary
18	Denmark
19	Germany
20	Ireland
21	Australia
22	Finland
23	Estonia
24	Hong Kong
25	England
26	Turkey
27	India
28	Wales
29	Austria
30	Brazil
31	Latvia
32	Slovakia

Place	Team
33	Belgium
34	Chinese Taipei
35	Nigeria
36	Philippines
37	Puerto Rico
38	Romania
39	Kenya
