= Simon Granbom =

Swedish male curler

- Curler
- Born: July 2, 1993 (age 33)

Team
- Curling club: CK Granit Gävle, Gävle, SWE
- Skip: Fredrik Nyman
- Third: Patric Mabergs
- Second: Simon Granbom
- Lead: Johannes Patz

Curling career
- Member Association: Sweden
- World Mixed Championship: 1 (2024)
- Other appearances: World Junior Championships: 2 (2014, 2015)
Medal record
Curling
Representing Sweden
World Mixed Championship
Gold medal – first place	2024 Aberdeen
Representing Gävle
Swedish Men's Championship
Silver medal – second place	2024 Jönköping
Silver medal – second place	2025 Härnösand
Bronze medal – third place	2018 Skellefteå
Bronze medal – third place	2019 Jönköping
Bronze medal – third place	2020 Jönköping
Bronze medal – third place	2023 Karlstad

Simon Magnus Dahlbäck Granbom (born 2 July 1993) is a Swedish curler from Gävle. He currently skips a team on the World Curling Tour.

== Career ==
Granbom is a two-time Swedish junior champion, playing third for Team Fredrik Nyman. As a member of Team Nyman, Granbom represented Sweden at the 2014 and 2015 World Junior Curling Championships, finishing 6th and 4th place respectively.

After juniors, Granbom joined the Jon Melin rink as his second for the 2016-17 season, and then as third for 2017-18. The team won a bronze medal at the 2017 and 2018 Swedish Men's Curling Championship. In 2018, he joined the Cameron Bryce rink at third when Bryce played out of Sweden. Granbom won another bronze at the Swedish championships in 2019 as a member of Team Bryce. As a member of this team, Granbom won his first World Curling Tour event, the 2018 Prague Classic.

In 2019, Granbom formed his own rink as skip, with a team consisting of Fabian Wingfors, Axel Sjöberg and Jacob Hanna. The team won their first tour event at the 2020 Match Town Trophy. In 2021 they defended their title.

In mixed doubles curling, Granbom won the 2019 Bele Wranå Memorial World Curling Tour event with partner Isabell Andersson.
