= 2019 Swedish Men's Curling Championship =

- Host city: Jönköping
- Dates: January 2-6, 2019
- Winner: Karlstads CK Edin (Karlstad)
- Curling club: Karlstads CK, Karlstad
- Skip: Niklas Edin
- Third: Oskar Eriksson
- Second: Rasmus Wranå
- Lead: Christoffer Sundgren
- Coach: Fredrik Lindberg
- Finalist: Leksands CK Team Dream (Leksand; Fredrik Nyman)

The 2019 Swedish Men's Curling Championship (Swedish: SM Damer, Herrar och Rullstolscurling 2019) was held in Jönköping from January 2 to 6, 2019.

Both 2019 Swedish Women's Curling Championship and 2019 Swedish Wheelchair Curling Championship were held simultaneously with this championship at the same arena.

== Teams ==
Team	Locale	Skip	Third	Second	Lead	Alternate Coach
Amatörföreningens CK Adersteg	Sundbyberg	Per Forsberg	David Nylund	Mats Söderkvist	Lars-Åke Linander	
Borlänge CC Haglöf	Borlänge	Marcus Haglöf	Mats Jakobsson	Anders Karlsson	Peter Nises	
Djursholms CK Raab	Danderyd	Kent Edqvist (4th)	Michael Raab (skip)	Ulf Sundberg	Mikael Guslin	
Göteborgs CK Team NP	Gothenburg	Patric Mabergs	Niclas Johansson	André Winther	Jonathan Holm	
Härnösands CK Engqvist	Härnösand	Johan Engqvist	Simon Olofsson	Isak Stener	Ture Stenvall	Hannes Lindquist
Jönköpings CC Pölder	Jönköping	Tony Pölder	Claes Mattsson	Daniel Svensson	John Hornberg	
Karlstads CK Edin	Karlstad	Niklas Edin	Oskar Eriksson	Rasmus Wranå	Christoffer Sundgren	Fredrik Lindberg
Karlstads CK Team Colorama	Karlstad	Daniel Magnusson	Johan Nygren	Anton Regosa	Sebastian Jones	Ivar Veszelei; Greta Aurell
Leksands CK Team Dream	Leksand	Fredrik Nyman	Axel Sjöberg	Max Bäck	Victor Martinsson	Olle Brudsten
Linköpings CK Pettersson	Linköping	Göran Carlsson	Håkan Nyberg	Hans Stenström	Rickard Eriksson	
Malmö CK Andersson	Malmö	Göran Andersson	Henrik Gustafsson	Erik Ekman	Patric Johnsson	Ola Elleström
Skellefteå CK Team Bryce	Skellefteå	Cameron Bryce	Simon Granbom	Johannes Patz	Filip Stener	
Stocksunds CK Westmans	Stockholm	Anders Kraupp	Mikael Vilenius	Peter Tedenbäck	Rolf Wikström	Mats Jansson
Sundbybergs CK Hedin	Sundbyberg	Johan Hedin	Josep Puigdemont	Hans Norrman	Tomas Gustafsson	
Umeå CK Lundmark	Umeå	Tobias Lundmark	Jonatan Nerdal	Anton Södergren	Eric Brasier	
Östersunds CK Markusson	Östersund	Emil Markusson	Daniel Berggren	Fredrik Ljungberg	Mikael Ljungberg	

== Triple knockout stage ==
=== A Event (A-stege) ===
Two winners - directly to medal stage, losers - to В Event.

Game 1
Karlstads CK Team Colorama	10
Malmö CK Andersson	5
Umeå CK Lundmark	7
Borlänge CC Haglöf	5
Östersunds CK Markusson	7
Härnösands CK Engqvist	3
Amatörföreningens CK Adersteg	3
Skellefteå CK Team Bryce	6

Game 2
Karlstads CK Team Colorama	8
Umeå CK Lundmark	2
Östersunds CK Markusson	1
Skellefteå CK Team Bryce	7

Game 3
Karlstads CK Team Colorama	4
Skellefteå CK Team Bryce	5

Game 1
Leksands CK Team Dream	9
Jönköpings CC Pölder	4
Djursholms CK Raab	0
Göteborgs CK Team NP	8
Linköpings CK Pettersson	7
Sundbybergs CK Hedin	4
Stocksunds CK Westmans	3
Karlstads CK Edin	11

Game 2
Leksands CK Team Dream	8
Göteborgs CK Team NP	3
Linköpings CK Pettersson	2
Karlstads CK Edin	9

Game 3
Leksands CK Team Dream	4
Karlstads CK Edin	9

=== B Event (B-stege) ===
Three winners - directly to medal stage, losers - to C Event.

Game 1		Game 2		Game 3
				Leksands CK Team Dream	5
Malmö CK Andersson	2			Härnösands CK Engqvist	6
Borlänge CC Haglöf	8	Borlänge CC Haglöf	5
Amatörföreningens CK Adersteg	7	Härnösands CK Engqvist	8
Härnösands CK Engqvist	8

Game 1		Game 2		Game 3
				Karlstads CK Team Colorama	1
Jönköpings CC Pölder	9			Stocksunds CK Westmans	9
Djursholms CK Raab	2	Jönköpings CC Pölder	1
Sundbybergs CK Hedin	2	Stocksunds CK Westmans	10
Stocksunds CK Westmans	7

Game 1
Umeå CK Lundmark	5
Östersunds CK Markusson	8
Göteborgs CK Team NP	3
Linköpings CK Pettersson	8

Game 2
Östersunds CK Markusson	2
Linköpings CK Pettersson	6

=== C Event (C-stege) ===
Three winners - directly to medal stage, losers - out.

Game 1		Game 2		Game 3
				Karlstads CK Team Colorama	6
				Göteborgs CK Team NP	5
		Göteborgs CK Team NP	9
Malmö CK Andersson	7	Amatörföreningens CK Adersteg	6
Amatörföreningens CK Adersteg	8

Game 1		Game 2		Game 3
				Leksands CK Team Dream	7
				Sundbybergs CK Hedin	0
		Umeå CK Lundmark	3
Djursholms CK Raab	1	Sundbybergs CK Hedin	4
Sundbybergs CK Hedin	7

Game 1		Game 2
		Östersunds CK Markusson	3
Borlänge CC Haglöf	6	Jönköpings CC Pölder	7
Jönköpings CC Pölder	7

== Medal stage (Slutspel) ==
=== Step 1 ===
Game 1
Skellefteå CK Team Bryce	7
Leksands CK Team Dream	3
Härnösands CK Engqvist	5
Karlstads CK Team Colorama	6
Linköpings CK Pettersson	4
Stocksunds CK Westmans	5
Karlstads CK Edin	11
Jönköpings CC Pölder	2

Game 2
Skellefteå CK Team Bryce	6
Karlstads CK Team Colorama	7
Stocksunds CK Westmans	1
Karlstads CK Edin	6

to semifinals
Karlstads CK Team Colorama
Karlstads CK Edin

=== Step 2 ===
loser — to common 7th place
Härnösands CK Engqvist	1
Leksands CK Team Dream	9
Linköpings CK Pettersson	4
Jönköpings CC Pölder	6

loser — to common 5th place
Stocksunds CK Westmans	2
Leksands CK Team Dream	8
Skellefteå CK Team Bryce	10
Jönköpings CC Pölder	4

to semifinals
Leksands CK Team Dream
Skellefteå CK Team Bryce

=== Step 3 ===
Semifinals (loser — to common 3rd place)
Karlstads CK Team Colorama	1
Leksands CK Team Dream	6
Karlstads CK Edin	9
Skellefteå CK Team Bryce	2

Final
Leksands CK Team Dream	2
Karlstads CK Edin	5

Semifinals. January 6, 9:00 am

Sheet B	1	2	3	4	5	6	7	8	9	10	Final
Leksands CK Team Dream (Nyman)	0	1	1	0	2	1	1	X	X	X	6
Karlstads CK Team Colorama (Magnusson)	1	0	0	0	0	0	X	X	X	X	1

Sheet C	1	2	3	4	5	6	7	8	9	10	Final
Karlstads CK Edin	0	2	0	6	1	0	X	X	X	X	9
Skellefteå CK Team Bryce	0	0	1	0	0	1	X	X	X	X	2

Final. January 6, 2:00 pm

Sheet E	1	2	3	4	5	6	7	8	9	10	Final
Karlstads CK Edin	0	2	0	0	0	2	0	1	0	X	5
Leksands CK Team Dream (Nyman)	0	0	0	0	1	0	0	0	1	X	2

== Final standings ==
Place	Team	Skip	Games	Wins	Losses
1st place, gold medalist(s)	Karlstads CK Edin	Niklas Edin	6	6	0
2nd place, silver medalist(s)	Leksands CK Team Dream	Fredrik Nyman	10	6	4
3rd place, bronze medalist(s)	Karlstads CK Team Colorama	Daniel Magnusson	8	5	3
3rd place, bronze medalist(s)	Skellefteå CK Team Bryce	Cameron Bryce	7	5	2
5	Stocksunds CK Westmans	Anders Kraupp	7	4	3
5	Jönköpings CC Pölder	Tony Pölder	7	4	3
7	Härnösands CK Engqvist	Johan Engqvist	6	3	3
7	Linköpings CK Pettersson	Göran Carlsson	6	3	3
9	Göteborgs CK Team NP	Patric Mabergs	5	2	3
9	Sundbybergs CK Hedin	Johan Hedin	5	2	3
9	Östersunds CK Markusson	Emil Markusson	5	2	3
12	Amatörföreningens CK Adersteg	Per Forsberg	4	1	3
12	Umeå CK Lundmark	Tobias Lundmark	4	1	3
12	Borlänge CC Haglöf	Marcus Haglöf	4	1	3
15	Malmö CK Andersson	Göran Andersson	3	0	3
15	Djursholms CK Raab	Michael Raab	3	0	3

== See also ==
- 2019 Swedish Women's Curling Championship
