= 2015 World Junior Curling Championships =

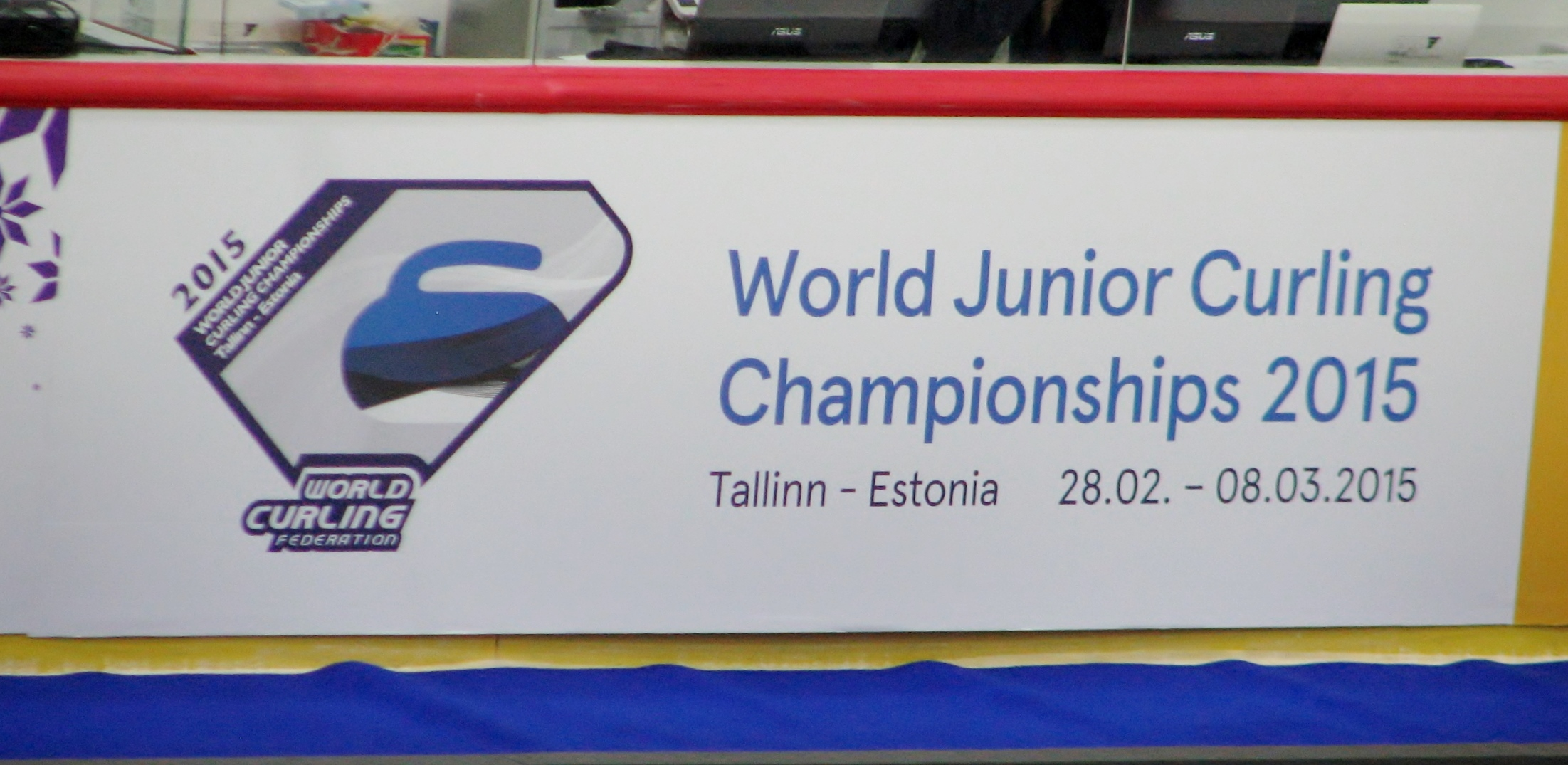
- Host city: Tallinn, Estonia
- Arena: Tondiraba Ice Rink
- Dates: February 28 – March 8
- Men's winner: Canada
- Curling club: Deer Lodge CC, Winnipeg
- Skip: Braden Calvert
- Third: Kyle Kurz
- Second: Lucas van den Bosch
- Lead: Brendan Wilson
- Alternate: Colton Lott
- Finalist: Switzerland (Yannick Schwaller)
- Women's winner: Canada
- Curling club: Saville SC, Edmonton
- Skip: Kelsey Rocque
- Third: Danielle Schmiemann
- Second: Holly Jamieson
- Lead: Jessica Iles
- Alternate: Kristen Streifel
- Finalist: Scotland (Gina Aitken)

The 2015 World Junior Curling Championships was held from February 28 to March 8 at the Tondiraba Ice Rink in Tallinn, Estonia.

== Men ==
=== Teams ===
The teams are listed as follows:

Country	Skip	Third	Second	Lead	Alternate
Canada	Braden Calvert	Kyle Kurz	Lucas van den Bosch	Brendan Wilson	Colton Lott
Estonia	Robert-Kent Päll	Sander Rõuk	Eiko-Siim Peips	Martin Leedo	Arne Karl Sternfeld
Italy	Amos Mosaner	Sebastiano Arman	Carlo Gottardi	Fabio Ribotta	Eugenio Molinatti
South Korea	Lee Ki-jeong	Lee Ki-bok	Kim Tae-geun	Son Seung-jo	Kim Chi-gu
Norway	Markus Skogvold (fourth)	Martin Sesaker	Wilhelm Næss	Gaute Nepstad (skip)	Peder Siksjoe
Russia	Artur Ali	Timur Gadzhikhanov	Alexandr Kuzmin	Mikhail Vaskov	Panteleimon Lappo
Scotland	Bruce Mouat	Duncan Menzies	Derrick Sloan	Angus Dowell	Bobby Lammie
Sweden	Fredrik Nyman	Simon Granbom	Johannes Patz	Victor Martinsson	Max Bäck
Switzerland	Romano Meier (fourth)	Yannick Schwaller (skip)	Patrick Witschonke	Michael Probst	Reto Keller
United States	Ethan Meyers	Quinn Evenson	Steven Szemple	William Pryor	Korey Dropkin

=== Round-robin standings ===
Final round-robin standings

Key
Teams to Playoffs

Country	Skip	W	L
Canada	Braden Calvert	8	1
Switzerland	Yannick Schwaller	7	2
Sweden	Fredrik Nyman	6	3
Scotland	Bruce Mouat	6	3
United States	Ethan Meyers	4	5
Norway	Gaute Nepstad	4	5
South Korea	Lee Ki-jeong	3	6
Italy	Amos Mosaner	3	6
Russia	Artur Ali	3	6
Estonia	Robert-Kent Pall	1	8

=== Round-robin results ===
==== Draw 1 ====
Saturday, February 28, 14:00

Sheet A	1	2	3	4	5	6	7	8	9	10	Final
Scotland (Mouat) 🔨	0	2	1	0	0	5	1	X	X	X	9
United States (Meyers)	0	0	0	2	0	0	0	X	X	X	2

Sheet B	1	2	3	4	5	6	7	8	9	10	Final
Sweden (Nyman) 🔨	1	0	0	2	1	1	1	0	2	X	8
Russia (Ali)	0	0	1	0	0	0	0	1	0	X	2

Sheet C	1	2	3	4	5	6	7	8	9	10	Final
Estonia (Pall)	1	2	0	2	0	1	0	0	0	1	7
Italy (Mosaner) 🔨	0	0	2	0	2	0	1	0	1	0	6

Sheet D	1	2	3	4	5	6	7	8	9	10	Final
Canada (Calvert) 🔨	0	1	0	4	0	3	0	0	X	X	8
Norway (Nepstad)	0	0	1	0	0	0	2	0	X	X	3

Sheet E	1	2	3	4	5	6	7	8	9	10	11	Final
Switzerland (Schwaller) 🔨	1	0	2	0	1	0	1	0	1	0	1	7
South Korea (Lee)	0	1	0	0	0	1	0	2	0	2	0	6

==== Draw 2 ====
Sunday, March 1, 9:00

Sheet A	1	2	3	4	5	6	7	8	9	10	Final
Russia (Ali)	0	0	0	1	0	0	5	0	1	X	7
Canada (Calvert) 🔨	0	2	0	0	0	1	0	1	0	X	4

Sheet B	1	2	3	4	5	6	7	8	9	10	Final
United States (Meyers) 🔨	0	2	0	0	1	0	0	0	0	1	4
Norway (Nepstad)	1	0	0	1	0	0	0	0	1	0	3

Sheet C	1	2	3	4	5	6	7	8	9	10	Final
Switzerland (Schwaller)	2	0	0	0	0	2	0	3	0	X	7
Scotland (Mouat) 🔨	0	0	1	0	1	0	1	0	1	X	4

Sheet D	1	2	3	4	5	6	7	8	9	10	11	Final
South Korea (Lee) 🔨	2	0	0	0	3	0	0	1	0	0	1	7
Italy (Mosaner)	0	0	0	1	0	1	1	0	0	3	0	6

Sheet E	1	2	3	4	5	6	7	8	9	10	Final
Sweden (Nyman) 🔨	2	2	2	2	2	0	X	X	X	X	10
Estonia (Pall)	0	0	0	0	0	1	X	X	X	X	1

==== Draw 3 ====
Sunday, March 1, 19:00

Sheet A	1	2	3	4	5	6	7	8	9	10	11	Final
Italy (Mosaner) 🔨	2	0	1	1	0	0	0	0	3	0	1	8
Sweden (Nyman)	0	1	0	0	1	1	1	1	0	2	0	7

Sheet B	1	2	3	4	5	6	7	8	9	10	Final
Scotland (Mouat)	0	0	2	0	0	1	0	1	0	1	5
South Korea (Lee) 🔨	1	0	0	1	0	0	0	0	2	0	4

Sheet C	1	2	3	4	5	6	7	8	9	10	Final
United States (Meyers)	0	1	1	0	0	0	1	1	0	X	4
Canada (Calvert) 🔨	4	0	0	0	1	0	0	0	1	X	6

Sheet D	1	2	3	4	5	6	7	8	9	10	Final
Estonia (Pall)	0	0	1	0	0	2	X	X	X	X	3
Switzerland (Schwaller) 🔨	4	3	0	4	3	0	X	X	X	X	14

Sheet E	1	2	3	4	5	6	7	8	9	10	Final
Russia (Ali)	0	0	0	0	1	0	0	2	0	2	5
Norway (Nepstad) 🔨	0	0	1	1	0	0	1	0	1	0	4

==== Draw 4 ====
Monday, March 2, 14:00

Sheet A	1	2	3	4	5	6	7	8	9	10	Final
Norway (Nepstad)	0	0	0	0	0	1	0	0	X	X	1
Switzerland (Schwaller) 🔨	0	2	2	0	0	0	1	2	X	X	7

Sheet B	1	2	3	4	5	6	7	8	9	10	Final
Estonia (Pall)	0	0	0	0	1	0	0	X	X	X	1
Canada (Calvert) 🔨	2	0	1	1	0	2	4	X	X	X	10

Sheet C	1	2	3	4	5	6	7	8	9	10	Final
South Korea (Lee)	0	2	0	2	0	1	0	1	0	2	8
Russia (Ali) 🔨	1	0	1	0	2	0	1	0	2	0	7

Sheet D	1	2	3	4	5	6	7	8	9	10	Final
Italy (Mosaner) 🔨	1	0	0	0	1	0	0	0	1	0	3
Scotland (Mouat)	0	0	2	1	0	1	0	0	0	1	5

Sheet E	1	2	3	4	5	6	7	8	9	10	Final
United States (Meyers)	0	0	2	0	0	2	0	1	0	X	5
Sweden (Nyman) 🔨	0	2	0	2	1	0	2	0	1	X	8

==== Draw 5 ====
Tuesday, March 3, 9:00

Sheet A	1	2	3	4	5	6	7	8	9	10	Final
Estonia (Pall)	0	1	0	0	0	0	0	X	X	X	1
Russia (Ali) 🔨	1	0	1	2	1	0	3	X	X	X	8

Sheet B	1	2	3	4	5	6	7	8	9	10	Final
Switzerland (Schwaller)	0	0	0	1	0	0	2	1	0	2	6
United States (Meyers) 🔨	0	1	2	0	1	0	0	0	1	0	5

Sheet C	1	2	3	4	5	6	7	8	9	10	Final
Scotland (Mouat)	4	0	0	1	0	1	3	X	X	X	9
Norway (Nepstad) 🔨	0	0	1	0	1	0	0	X	X	X	2

Sheet D	1	2	3	4	5	6	7	8	9	10	Final
Sweden (Nyman)	0	2	0	1	1	1	0	3	0	X	8
South Korea (Lee) 🔨	1	0	0	0	0	0	2	0	1	X	4

Sheet E	1	2	3	4	5	6	7	8	9	10	Final
Canada (Calvert) 🔨	0	3	1	0	0	1	0	0	X	X	5
Italy (Mosaner)	0	0	0	0	0	0	0	1	X	X	1

==== Draw 6 ====
Tuesday, March 3, 19:00

Sheet A	1	2	3	4	5	6	7	8	9	10	Final
Switzerland (Schwaller) 🔨	2	0	0	2	0	2	0	0	1	X	7
Italy (Mosaner)	0	0	1	0	2	0	0	1	0	X	4

Sheet B	1	2	3	4	5	6	7	8	9	10	Final
Russia (Ali) 🔨	2	1	0	0	0	0	X	X	X	X	3
Scotland (Mouat)	0	0	4	1	2	2	X	X	X	X	9

Sheet C	1	2	3	4	5	6	7	8	9	10	11	Final
Canada (Calvert) 🔨	0	0	0	0	1	0	0	0	0	1	1	3
Sweden (Nyman)	0	0	0	1	0	1	0	0	0	0	0	2

Sheet D	1	2	3	4	5	6	7	8	9	10	Final
Norway (Nepstad) 🔨	1	2	0	2	0	0	2	0	1	X	8
Estonia (Pall)	0	0	1	0	0	1	0	1	0	X	3

Sheet E	1	2	3	4	5	6	7	8	9	10	Final
South Korea (Lee)	0	0	0	0	1	1	0	0	0	0	2
United States (Meyers) 🔨	0	2	0	0	0	0	0	1	0	2	5

==== Draw 7 ====
Wednesday, March 4, 14:00

Sheet A	1	2	3	4	5	6	7	8	9	10	Final
Sweden (Nyman)	0	1	0	1	0	1	0	0	1	0	4
Norway (Nepstad) 🔨	1	0	1	0	1	0	1	1	0	1	6

Sheet B	1	2	3	4	5	6	7	8	9	10	Final
South Korea (Lee) 🔨	4	0	3	0	5	2	X	X	X	X	14
Estonia (Pall)	0	1	0	1	0	0	X	X	X	X	2

Sheet C	1	2	3	4	5	6	7	8	9	10	Final
Italy (Mosaner) 🔨	0	0	2	2	1	0	5	X	X	X	10
United States (Meyers)	0	0	0	0	0	1	0	X	X	X	1

Sheet D	1	2	3	4	5	6	7	8	9	10	Final
Switzerland (Schwaller)	0	1	1	0	3	0	2	0	X	X	7
Russia (Ali) 🔨	0	0	0	1	0	1	0	1	X	X	3

Sheet E	1	2	3	4	5	6	7	8	9	10	Final
Scotland (Mouat) 🔨	0	1	0	2	0	0	1	0	X	X	4
Canada (Calvert)	1	0	3	0	1	2	0	3	X	X	10

==== Draw 8 ====
Thursday, March 5, 9:00

Sheet A	1	2	3	4	5	6	7	8	9	10	Final
United States (Meyers) 🔨	1	3	0	1	0	1	0	0	3	X	9
Estonia (Pall)	0	0	1	0	2	0	0	1	0	X	4

Sheet B	1	2	3	4	5	6	7	8	9	10	Final
Canada (Calvert)	0	0	0	0	2	1	0	0	2	X	5
Switzerland (Schwaller) 🔨	2	0	0	0	0	0	0	1	0	X	3

Sheet C	1	2	3	4	5	6	7	8	9	10	Final
Norway (Nepstad) 🔨	0	3	0	0	0	2	0	1	0	0	6
South Korea (Lee)	0	0	2	1	1	0	0	0	0	1	5

Sheet D	1	2	3	4	5	6	7	8	9	10	Final
Scotland (Mouat)	2	0	1	0	0	0	1	0	1	0	5
Sweden (Nyman) 🔨	0	1	0	2	0	2	0	1	0	1	7

Sheet E	1	2	3	4	5	6	7	8	9	10	Final
Italy (Mosaner)	0	1	0	2	0	0	0	2	0	1	6
Russia (Ali) 🔨	0	0	1	0	0	0	2	0	1	0	4

==== Draw 9 ====
Thursday, March 5, 19:00

Sheet A	1	2	3	4	5	6	7	8	9	10	Final
Canada (Calvert) 🔨	1	0	1	0	0	3	0	1	0	0	6
South Korea (Lee)	0	0	0	0	2	0	1	0	1	1	5

Sheet B	1	2	3	4	5	6	7	8	9	10	Final
Norway (Nepstad)	0	0	0	1	0	0	0	3	0	1	5
Italy (Mosaner) 🔨	0	0	1	0	1	0	1	0	1	0	4

Sheet C	1	2	3	4	5	6	7	8	9	10	Final
Sweden (Nyman) 🔨	0	1	2	0	0	2	0	3	X	X	8
Switzerland (Schwaller)	0	0	0	0	1	0	1	0	X	X	2

Sheet D	1	2	3	4	5	6	7	8	9	10	Final
Russia (Ali)	0	0	0	0	0	0	0	X	X	X	0
United States (Meyers) 🔨	0	0	2	2	1	0	2	X	X	X	7

Sheet E	1	2	3	4	5	6	7	8	9	10	Final
Estonia (Pall)	0	0	0	0	1	0	X	X	X	X	1
Scotland (Mouat) 🔨	2	2	1	2	0	1	X	X	X	X	8

=== Playoffs ===
Page playoff system
1	Canada	7
2	Switzerland	6
3	Sweden	7
4	Scotland	6

Semifinal
2	Switzerland	9
3	Sweden	4

Final
1	Canada	6
2	Switzerland	3

Bronze-medal game
3	Sweden	3
4	Scotland	8

==== 1 vs. 2 ====
Friday, March 6, 19:00

Sheet B	1	2	3	4	5	6	7	8	9	10	Final
Canada (Calvert) 🔨	0	1	0	0	2	0	2	0	1	1	7
Switzerland (Schwaller)	0	0	2	0	0	2	0	2	0	0	6

==== 3 vs. 4 ====
Friday, March 6, 19:00

Sheet D	1	2	3	4	5	6	7	8	9	10	Final
Sweden (Nyman) 🔨	0	2	0	3	1	0	0	1	0	X	7
Scotland (Mouat)	0	0	1	0	0	2	1	0	2	X	6

==== Semifinal ====
Saturday, March 7, 19:00

Team	1	2	3	4	5	6	7	8	9	10	Final
Switzerland (Schwaller) 🔨	0	3	0	0	2	0	2	0	2	X	9
Sweden (Nyman)	0	0	1	0	0	2	0	1	0	X	4

==== Bronze-medal game ====
Sunday, March 8, 9:30

Team	1	2	3	4	5	6	7	8	9	10	Final
Sweden (Nyman) 🔨	0	0	0	1	0	2	0	0	0	X	3
Scotland (Mouat)	0	0	3	0	1	0	2	1	1	X	8

==== Final ====
Sunday, March 8, 9:30

Team	1	2	3	4	5	6	7	8	9	10	Final
Canada (Calvert) 🔨	0	2	0	1	0	1	0	2	0	X	6
Switzerland (Schwaller)	0	0	0	0	0	0	1	0	2	X	3

== Women ==
=== Teams ===
The teams are listed as follows:

Country	Skip	Third	Second	Lead	Alternate
Canada	Kelsey Rocque	Danielle Schmiemann	Holly Jamieson	Jessica Iles	Kristen Streifel
Czech Republic	Alžběta Baudyšová	Helena Hájková	Eliška Srnská	Lenka Hronová	Andrea Krupanská
England	Hetty Garnier	Angharad Ward	Naomi Robinson	Lucy Sparks	Niamh Fenton
Estonia	Marie Turmann	Kerli Zirk	Kerli Laidsalu	Johanna Ehatamm	Victoria-Laura Lõhmus
South Korea	Kim Eun-bi	Hyoung Bo-ram	Hwang Su-bin	Shin Ga-yeong	Jeon Jeong-hyeon
Russia	Uliana Vasilyeva (fourth)	Maria Baksheeva	Ekaterina Kuzmina	Evgeniya Demkina (skip)	Anastasia Moskaleva
Scotland	Gina Aitken	Naomi Brown	Rowena Kerr	Rachel Hannen	Karina Aitken
Sweden	Isabella Wranå	Jennie Wåhlin	Johanna Heldin	Fanny Sjöberg	Johanna Höglund
Switzerland	Briar Hürlimann (fourth)	Lisa Gisler (skip)	Rahel Thoma	Elena Stern	Raphaela Keiser
United States	Cory Christensen	Sarah Anderson	Mackenzie Lank	Jenna Haag	Taylor Anderson

=== Round-robin standings ===
Final round-robin standings

Key
Teams to Playoffs
Teams to Tie-Breakers

Country	Skip	W	L
Canada	Kelsey Rocque	9	0
Scotland	Gina Aitken	6	3
Sweden	Isabella Wranå	6	3
United States	Cory Christensen	5	4
Switzerland	Lisa Gisler	5	4
South Korea	Kim Eun-bi	5	4
Russia	Evgeniya Demkina	5	4
Estonia	Marie Turmann	2	7
England	Hetty Garnier	2	7
Czech Republic	Alžběta Baudyšová	0	9

=== Round-robin results ===
==== Draw 1 ====
Saturday, February 28, 18:30

Sheet A	1	2	3	4	5	6	7	8	9	10	Final
Switzerland (Gisler)	0	0	2	0	1	0	0	X	X	X	3
Sweden (Wranå) 🔨	2	2	0	1	0	1	5	X	X	X	11

Sheet B	1	2	3	4	5	6	7	8	9	10	Final
Canada (Rocque)	0	0	1	0	1	0	2	1	3	X	8
Czech Republic (Baudyšová) 🔨	0	0	0	0	0	1	0	0	0	X	1

Sheet C	1	2	3	4	5	6	7	8	9	10	11	Final
United States (Christensen)	0	0	1	0	4	0	1	0	1	0	0	7
Russia (Demkina) 🔨	0	2	0	1	0	1	0	2	0	1	1	8

Sheet D	1	2	3	4	5	6	7	8	9	10	Final
Scotland (Aitken) 🔨	2	1	0	3	1	1	0	X	X	X	8
Estonia (Turmann)	0	0	1	0	0	0	1	X	X	X	2

Sheet E	1	2	3	4	5	6	7	8	9	10	Final
South Korea (Kim) 🔨	1	1	0	0	1	0	0	2	4	X	9
England (Garnier)	0	0	1	1	0	0	1	0	0	X	3

==== Draw 2 ====
Sunday, March 1, 14:00

Sheet A	1	2	3	4	5	6	7	8	9	10	Final
Czech Republic (Baudyšová)	0	0	0	1	1	0	0	2	0	X	4
Scotland (Aitken) 🔨	1	1	0	0	0	0	3	0	1	X	6

Sheet B	1	2	3	4	5	6	7	8	9	10	Final
Sweden (Wranå) 🔨	0	3	0	0	4	2	X	X	X	X	9
Estonia (Turmann)	0	0	0	1	0	0	X	X	X	X	1

Sheet C	1	2	3	4	5	6	7	8	9	10	Final
South Korea (Kim)	0	1	0	1	0	0	0	0	X	X	2
Switzerland (Gisler) 🔨	2	0	0	0	2	1	1	2	X	X	8

Sheet D	1	2	3	4	5	6	7	8	9	10	Final
England (Garnier)	0	1	0	1	0	1	0	2	0	0	5
Russia (Demkina) 🔨	0	0	1	0	0	0	1	0	1	1	4

Sheet E	1	2	3	4	5	6	7	8	9	10	Final
Canada (Rocque) 🔨	0	2	0	0	1	0	0	2	2	X	7
United States (Christensen)	0	0	0	1	0	1	1	0	0	X	3

==== Draw 3 ====
Monday, March 2, 9:00

Sheet A	1	2	3	4	5	6	7	8	9	10	Final
Russia (Demkina) 🔨	0	1	0	1	0	1	0	0	X	X	3
Canada (Rocque)	0	0	3	0	2	0	1	4	X	X	10

Sheet B	1	2	3	4	5	6	7	8	9	10	Final
Switzerland (Gisler)	0	2	0	0	0	2	1	1	0	1	7
England (Garnier) 🔨	2	0	0	0	1	0	0	0	2	0	5

Sheet C	1	2	3	4	5	6	7	8	9	10	Final
Sweden (Wranå) 🔨	0	2	0	1	0	0	0	2	0	X	5
Scotland (Aitken)	3	0	1	0	1	1	1	0	3	X	10

Sheet D	1	2	3	4	5	6	7	8	9	10	Final
United States (Christensen)	1	0	3	1	1	0	4	0	X	X	10
South Korea (Kim) 🔨	0	1	0	0	0	1	0	2	X	X	4

Sheet E	1	2	3	4	5	6	7	8	9	10	Final
Czech Republic (Baudyšová) 🔨	0	0	1	0	0	1	0	0	1	1	4
Estonia (Turmann)	0	0	0	2	1	0	1	2	0	0	6

==== Draw 4 ====
Monday, March 2, 19:00

Sheet A	1	2	3	4	5	6	7	8	9	10	Final
Estonia (Turmann)	0	0	0	1	0	2	0	0	1	0	4
South Korea (Kim) 🔨	0	1	0	0	3	0	0	1	0	2	7

Sheet B	1	2	3	4	5	6	7	8	9	10	Final
United States (Christensen) 🔨	0	1	0	1	0	0	0	0	X	X	2
Scotland (Aitken)	1	0	1	0	3	1	1	1	X	X	8

Sheet C	1	2	3	4	5	6	7	8	9	10	Final
England (Garnier)	0	1	0	0	2	0	0	1	0	2	6
Czech Republic (Baudyšová) 🔨	1	0	0	1	0	2	0	0	1	0	5

Sheet D	1	2	3	4	5	6	7	8	9	10	Final
Russia (Demkina) 🔨	0	1	0	0	0	0	2	0	1	0	4
Switzerland (Gisler)	0	0	0	2	0	1	0	1	0	1	5

Sheet E	1	2	3	4	5	6	7	8	9	10	Final
Sweden (Wranå) 🔨	0	0	1	0	0	0	0	1	0	X	2
Canada (Rocque)	0	0	0	0	1	1	0	0	2	X	4

==== Draw 5 ====
Tuesday, March 3, 14:00

Sheet A	1	2	3	4	5	6	7	8	9	10	Final
United States (Christensen)	0	4	0	1	0	1	1	1	1	X	9
Czech Republic (Baudyšová) 🔨	0	0	2	0	1	0	0	0	0	X	3

Sheet B	1	2	3	4	5	6	7	8	9	10	Final
South Korea (Kim) 🔨	2	0	0	0	2	0	0	0	0	X	4
Sweden (Wranå)	0	2	0	1	0	1	0	2	1	X	7

Sheet C	1	2	3	4	5	6	7	8	9	10	Final
Switzerland (Gisler) 🔨	0	4	0	0	0	0	0	2	0	X	6
Estonia (Turmann)	0	0	1	0	0	3	0	0	0	X	4

Sheet D	1	2	3	4	5	6	7	8	9	10	Final
Canada (Rocque) 🔨	0	0	0	2	1	2	1	0	X	X	6
England (Garnier)	0	0	1	0	0	0	0	1	X	X	2

Sheet E	1	2	3	4	5	6	7	8	9	10	Final
Scotland (Aitken)	0	0	1	0	1	0	2	0	1	0	5
Russia (Demkina) 🔨	0	1	0	3	0	1	0	1	0	1	7

==== Draw 6 ====
Wednesday, March 4, 9:00

Sheet A	1	2	3	4	5	6	7	8	9	10	Final
South Korea (Kim)	0	0	3	1	0	0	0	3	0	0	7
Russia (Demkina) 🔨	0	2	0	0	1	0	1	0	1	1	6

Sheet B	1	2	3	4	5	6	7	8	9	10	Final
Czech Republic (Baudyšová)	0	0	1	0	0	3	0	0	0	X	4
Switzerland (Gisler) 🔨	1	0	0	2	2	0	2	1	1	X	9

Sheet C	1	2	3	4	5	6	7	8	9	10	Final
Scotland (Aitken)	0	0	1	1	0	0	0	X	X	X	2
Canada (Rocque) 🔨	0	2	0	0	3	1	3	X	X	X	9

Sheet D	1	2	3	4	5	6	7	8	9	10	Final
Estonia (Turmann) 🔨	1	0	0	1	0	0	0	1	0	0	3
United States (Christensen)	0	2	1	0	0	0	0	0	1	1	5

Sheet E	1	2	3	4	5	6	7	8	9	10	Final
England (Garnier)	0	0	0	3	0	1	1	1	0	0	6
Sweden (Wranå) 🔨	3	0	1	0	1	0	0	0	0	2	7

==== Draw 7 ====
Wednesday, March 4, 19:00

Sheet A	1	2	3	4	5	6	7	8	9	10	Final
Canada (Rocque) 🔨	0	2	2	0	2	0	2	0	X	X	8
Estonia (Turmann)	0	0	0	1	0	1	0	0	X	X	2

Sheet B	1	2	3	4	5	6	7	8	9	10	Final
England (Garnier)	0	0	0	2	0	1	X	X	X	X	3
United States (Christensen) 🔨	4	2	4	0	4	0	X	X	X	X	14

Sheet C	1	2	3	4	5	6	7	8	9	10	11	Final
Russia (Demkina) 🔨	0	0	0	1	0	1	1	0	0	1	2	6
Sweden (Wranå)	0	0	1	0	2	0	0	1	0	0	0	4

Sheet D	1	2	3	4	5	6	7	8	9	10	Final
South Korea (Kim)	2	0	3	1	0	0	0	1	0	1	8
Czech Republic (Baudyšová) 🔨	0	3	0	0	2	0	1	0	0	0	6

Sheet E	1	2	3	4	5	6	7	8	9	10	Final
Switzerland (Gisler) 🔨	1	0	1	0	2	0	0	0	2	0	6
Scotland (Aitken)	0	1	0	2	0	0	0	3	0	5	11

==== Draw 8 ====
Thursday, March 5, 14:00

Sheet A	1	2	3	4	5	6	7	8	9	10	Final
Sweden (Wranå)	0	2	0	1	2	0	2	0	2	X	9
United States (Christensen) 🔨	1	0	2	0	0	2	0	1	0	X	6

Sheet B	1	2	3	4	5	6	7	8	9	10	Final
Scotland (Aitken) 🔨	1	1	0	0	2	0	0	0	1	1	6
South Korea (Kim)	0	0	4	0	0	1	1	1	0	0	7

Sheet C	1	2	3	4	5	6	7	8	9	10	Final
Estonia (Turmann)	0	0	0	1	2	0	2	1	1	0	7
England (Garnier) 🔨	0	2	0	0	0	2	0	0	0	1	5

Sheet D	1	2	3	4	5	6	7	8	9	10	Final
Switzerland (Gisler)	0	0	0	0	0	1	0	0	2	0	3
Canada (Rocque) 🔨	0	0	0	1	1	0	0	1	0	1	4

Sheet E	1	2	3	4	5	6	7	8	9	10	Final
Russia (Demkina) 🔨	1	0	2	0	2	0	3	0	2	X	10
Czech Republic (Baudyšová)	0	1	0	3	0	1	0	1	0	X	6

==== Draw 9 ====
Friday, March 6, 9:00

Sheet A	1	2	3	4	5	6	7	8	9	10	Final
Scotland (Aitken) 🔨	1	1	0	1	3	0	1	0	X	X	7
England (Garnier)	0	0	1	0	0	1	0	1	X	X	3

Sheet B	1	2	3	4	5	6	7	8	9	10	Final
Estonia (Turmann)	0	0	0	0	0	0	2	X	X	X	2
Russia (Demkina) 🔨	3	1	0	2	1	1	0	X	X	X	8

Sheet C	1	2	3	4	5	6	7	8	9	10	Final
Canada (Rocque) 🔨	0	0	1	1	1	1	3	0	X	X	7
South Korea (Kim)	0	0	0	0	0	0	0	1	X	X	1

Sheet D	1	2	3	4	5	6	7	8	9	10	Final
Czech Republic (Baudyšová)	0	0	0	1	0	0	2	0	0	X	3
Sweden (Wranå) 🔨	0	1	1	0	2	1	0	0	5	X	10

Sheet E	1	2	3	4	5	6	7	8	9	10	Final
United States (Christensen)	0	0	2	1	1	1	2	0	0	X	7
Switzerland (Gisler) 🔨	0	1	0	0	0	0	0	1	1	X	3

=== Tiebreakers ===
Friday, March 6, 14:00

Sheet B	1	2	3	4	5	6	7	8	9	10	Final
United States (Christensen) 🔨	0	0	0	0	1	0	1	1	1	0	4
Switzerland (Gisler)	1	0	0	2	0	2	0	0	0	1	6

Sheet D	1	2	3	4	5	6	7	8	9	10	Final
Russia (Demkina)	0	0	0	0	2	1	0	1	0	1	5
South Korea (Kim) 🔨	0	0	0	2	0	0	3	0	1	0	6

=== Playoffs ===
Page playoff system
1	Canada	9
2	Scotland	2
3	Sweden	10
4	Switzerland	4

Semifinal
2	Scotland	6
3	Sweden	1

Final
1	Canada	8
2	Scotland	2

Bronze-medal game
3	Sweden	6
4	Switzerland	7

==== 1 vs. 2 ====
Saturday, March 7, 14:00

Team	1	2	3	4	5	6	7	8	9	10	Final
Canada (Rocque) 🔨	1	0	3	0	0	1	2	2	X	X	9
Scotland (Aitken)	0	1	0	0	1	0	0	0	X	X	2

==== 3 vs. 4 ====
Saturday, March 7, 14:00

Team	1	2	3	4	5	6	7	8	9	10	Final
Sweden (Wranå) 🔨	2	0	3	0	2	2	1	0	X	X	10
Switzerland (Gisler)	0	1	0	2	0	0	0	1	X	X	4

==== Semifinal ====
Saturday, March 7, 19:00

Team	1	2	3	4	5	6	7	8	9	10	Final
Scotland (Aitken) 🔨	1	1	0	0	1	1	0	2	X	X	6
Sweden (Wranå)	0	0	0	1	0	0	0	0	X	X	1

==== Bronze-medal game ====
Sunday, March 8, 14:00

Team	1	2	3	4	5	6	7	8	9	10	11	Final
Sweden (Wranå) 🔨	1	1	1	0	1	0	1	0	1	0	0	6
Switzerland (Gisler)	0	0	0	1	0	3	0	1	0	1	1	7

==== Final ====
Sunday, March 8, 14:00

Team	1	2	3	4	5	6	7	8	9	10	Final
Canada (Rocque) 🔨	0	1	0	3	0	0	3	1	X	X	8
Scotland (Aitken)	0	0	1	0	0	1	0	0	X	X	2
