= 2014 European Mixed Curling Championship =

- Host city: Tårnby, Denmark
- Arena: Tårnby Curling Club
- Dates: September 13–20
- Winner: Sweden
- Curling club: Skellefteå CK, Skellefteå
- Skip: Patric Mabergs
- Third: Isabella Wranå
- Second: Johannes Patz
- Lead: Sofia Mabergs
- Finalist: Norway (Steffen Walstad)

The 2014 European Mixed Curling Championship was held from September 13 to 20 at the Tårnby Curling Club in Tårnby, Denmark.

Sweden, skipped by Patric Mabergs, won their first European Mixed title after defeating Norway, skipped by Steffen Walstad, with a score of 9–2.

== Teams ==
The teams are listed as follows:

=== Group A ===
Austria	Denmark	France	Germany	Netherlands
Fourth: Sebastian Wunderer; Skip: Karina Toth; Second: Mathias Genner; Lead: Constanze Hummelt	Skip: Madeleine Dupont; Third: Mikkel Krause; Second: Denise Dupont; Lead: Dennis Hansen	Skip: Lionel Roux; Third: Helene Grieshaber; Second: Xavier Bibollet; Lead: Florence Richard	Skip: Rainer Schöpp; Third: Andrea Schöpp; Second: Sebastian Jacoby; Lead: Kerstin Ruch	Skip: Margrietha Voskuilen; Third: Danny van den Berg; Second: Lisette Brilman; Lead: Willem van der Steeg
Norway	Slovenia	Sweden	Turkey	
Skip: Steffen Walstad; Third: Kristin Skaslien; Second: Magnus Nedregotten; Lead: Julie Molnar	Skip: Tomas Tisler; Third: Nadja Pipan; Second: Jost Lajovec; Lead: Marusa Gorisek	Skip: Patric Mabergs; Third: Isabella Wranå; Second: Johannes Patz; Lead: Sofia Mabergs	Skip: Öznur Polat; Third: Alican Karataş; Second: Elif Kızılkaya; Lead: Muhammet Oǧuz Zengin	

=== Group B ===
Czech Republic	England	Latvia	Poland
Skip: Jakub Bareš; Third: Lenka Kitzbergerová; Second: Michal Zdenka; Lead: Michaela Nádherová	Skip: Ben Fowler; Third: Lorna Rettig; Second: Nigel Patrick; Lead: Anna Fowler	Skip: Kārlis Smigla; Third: Iluta Linde; Second: Arnis Veidemanis; Lead: Vineta Smigla	Skip: Konrad Stych; Third: Marta Pluta; Second: Tomasz Pluta; Lead: Ewa Stych
Russia	Scotland	Slovakia	Switzerland
Skip: Alexey Tselousov; Third: Alina Kovaleva; Second: Alexey Timofeev; Lead: Elena Efimova	Skip: Kyle Smith; Third: Hannah Fleming; Second: Billy Morton; Lead: Alice Spence	Skip: David Misun; Third: Lucia Orokocka; Second: Patrik Kapralik; Lead: Zuzana Kohaniova	Fourth: Martin Rios; Skip: Silvana Tirinzoni; Second: Romano Meier; Lead: Jenny Perret

=== Group C ===
Belarus	Estonia	Finland	Hungary
Skip: Alina Pavlyuchik; Third: Oleksei Voloshenko; Second: Susanna Ivashyna; Lead: Yury Pavlyuchik	Skip: Erkki Lill; Third: Maile Mölder; Second: Siim Sildnik; Lead: Marie Turmann	Skip: Tomi Rantamäki; Third: Anne Malmi; Second: Pekka Peura; Lead: Tiina Suuripää	Skip: György Nagy; Third: Ildikó Szekeres; Second: Zsolt Kiss; Lead: Ágnes Szentannai
Italy	Romania	Spain	Wales
Skip: Simone Gonin; Third: Lucrezia Salvai; Second: Alessio Gonin; Lead: Emanuela Cavallo	Skip: Attila Gall; Third: Teodora Adumitroaei; Second: Paul Marin; Lead: Oana Marin	Skip: Antonio de Mollinedo; Third: Melanie Robillard; Second: José Manuel Sangüesa; Lead: Ana Arce	Skip: Adrian Meikle; Third: Dawn Watson; Second: Andrew Tanner; Lead: Laura Beever

== Round robin standings ==
Final Round Robin Standings

Key
Teams to Playoffs
Teams to Draw Shot Challenge (team with best moves to playoffs, other two play in qualification game)
Teams to Tiebreaker (winner moves on to Draw Shot Challenge)

Group A	Skip	W	L
Denmark	Madeleine Dupont	7	1
Sweden	Patric Mabergs	6	2
Germany	Rainer Schöpp	6	2
Norway	Steffen Walstad	6	2
Austria	Karina Toth	5	3
France	Lionel Roux	2	6
Turkey	Öznur Polat	2	6
Slovenia	Tomas Tisler	1	7
Netherlands	Margrietha Voskuilen	1	7

Group B	Skip	W	L
Scotland	Kyle Smith	6	1
Switzerland	Silvana Tirinzoni	6	1
Russia	Alexey Tselousov	5	2
Czech Republic	Jakub Bareš	4	3
England	Ben Fowler	2	5
Poland	Konrad Stych	2	5
Slovakia	David Misun	2	5
Latvia	Kārlis Smigla	1	6

Group C	Skip	W	L
Hungary	György Nagy	7	0
Finland	Tomi Rantamäki	6	1
Italy	Simone Gonin	5	2
Estonia	Erkki Lill	3	4
Spain	Antonio de Mollinedo	3	4
Wales	Adrian Meikle	3	4
Belarus	Alina Pavlyuchik	1	6
Romania	Attila Gall	0	7

== Round robin results ==
All draw times are listed in Central European Time (UTC+01).

=== Group A ===
==== Sunday, September 14 ====
Draw 1 8:00

Sheet A	1	2	3	4	5	6	7	8	Final
Turkey (Polat) 🔨	1	0	2	0	0	0	0	X	3
Norway (Walstad)	0	1	0	3	2	1	0	X	7

Sheet B	1	2	3	4	5	6	7	8	Final
Germany (Schöpp) 🔨	1	3	2	2	0	2	0	X	10
France (Roux)	0	0	0	0	2	0	1	X	3

Sheet C	1	2	3	4	5	6	7	8	Final
Denmark (Dupont) 🔨	0	2	0	3	1	0	0	X	6
Slovenia (Tisler)	1	0	1	0	0	1	1	X	4

Sheet D	1	2	3	4	5	6	7	8	Final
Sweden (Mabergs) 🔨	2	0	0	0	0	1	0	X	3
Austria (Toth)	0	2	1	2	1	0	2	X	8

Draw 3 16:00

Sheet A	1	2	3	4	5	6	7	8	Final
Slovenia (Tisler)	0	2	1	0	0	2	0	X	5
France (Roux) 🔨	3	0	0	1	3	0	3	X	10

Sheet B	1	2	3	4	5	6	7	8	Final
Norway (Walstad) 🔨	2	0	3	0	4	0	X	X	9
Austria (Toth)	0	1	0	2	0	0	X	X	3

Sheet C	1	2	3	4	5	6	7	8	Final
Netherlands (Voskuilen)	0	0	0	0	0	0	X	X	0
Germany (Schöpp) 🔨	7	2	1	2	2	1	X	X	15

Sheet D	1	2	3	4	5	6	7	8	Final
Denmark (Dupont)	1	2	0	1	2	0	2	X	8
Turkey (Polat) 🔨	0	0	3	0	0	2	0	X	5

==== Monday, September 15 ====
Draw 5 8:00

Sheet A	1	2	3	4	5	6	7	8	Final
Austria (Toth)	0	1	0	1	0	0	X	X	2
Germany (Schöpp) 🔨	1	0	3	0	4	1	X	X	9

Sheet B	1	2	3	4	5	6	7	8	Final
Netherlands (Voskuilen)	0	0	1	0	0	1	0	X	2
Denmark (Dupont) 🔨	0	4	0	1	3	0	1	X	9

Sheet C	1	2	3	4	5	6	7	8	Final
Turkey (Polat)	0	0	1	0	1	0	1	X	3
Sweden (Mabergs) 🔨	0	3	0	2	0	3	0	X	8

Sheet E	1	2	3	4	5	6	7	8	Final
Slovenia (Tisler) 🔨	0	1	0	2	0	1	0	X	4
Norway (Walstad)	2	0	2	0	3	0	1	X	8

Draw 7 16:00

Sheet A	1	2	3	4	5	6	7	8	Final
Denmark (Dupont)	2	0	3	0	3	0	0	1	9
Sweden (Mabergs) 🔨	0	1	0	3	0	1	1	0	6

Sheet B	1	2	3	4	5	6	7	8	Final
Turkey (Polat)	0	1	0	0	0	1	1	2	5
Slovenia (Tisler) 🔨	1	0	0	2	1	0	0	0	4

Sheet C	1	2	3	4	5	6	7	8	Final
Norway (Walstad)	0	2	1	0	2	0	0	2	7
France (Roux) 🔨	0	0	0	4	0	2	0	0	6

Sheet E	1	2	3	4	5	6	7	8	9	Final
Austria (Toth) 🔨	0	3	0	1	0	1	0	2	1	8
Netherlands (Voskuilen)	4	0	1	0	1	0	1	0	0	7

==== Tuesday, September 16 ====
Draw 10 12:00

Sheet E	1	2	3	4	5	6	7	8	Final
Netherlands (Voskuilen)	0	0	1	0	0	0	X	X	1
Turkey (Polat) 🔨	2	2	0	1	2	2	X	X	9

Draw 11 16:00

Sheet B	1	2	3	4	5	6	7	8	Final
Sweden (Mabergs) 🔨	0	1	0	1	0	1	1	2	6
Germany (Schöpp)	0	0	1	0	1	0	0	0	2

Sheet C	1	2	3	4	5	6	7	8	Final
Slovenia (Tisler)	0	3	0	1	0	0	0	1	5
Austria (Toth) 🔨	1	0	1	0	2	1	1	0	6

Sheet D	1	2	3	4	5	6	7	8	Final
France (Roux) 🔨	0	0	0	2	1	0	0	X	3
Denmark (Dupont)	1	1	1	0	0	4	1	X	8

==== Wednesday, September 17 ====
Draw 14 12:00

Sheet A	1	2	3	4	5	6	7	8	Final
France (Roux)	0	0	2	0	2	0	X	X	4
Austria (Toth) 🔨	3	3	0	5	0	0	X	X	11

Sheet B	1	2	3	4	5	6	7	8	Final
Denmark (Dupont)	0	1	1	0	1	0	2	0	5
Norway (Walstad) 🔨	1	0	0	1	0	4	0	1	7

Sheet C	1	2	3	4	5	6	7	8	Final
Sweden (Mabergs) 🔨	2	0	2	1	0	3	0	X	8
Netherlands (Voskuilen)	0	1	0	0	1	0	1	X	3

Sheet D	1	2	3	4	5	6	7	8	Final
Germany (Schöpp)	1	0	0	2	1	1	4	X	9
Slovenia (Tisler) 🔨	0	0	2	0	0	0	0	X	2

Draw 16 20:00

Sheet B	1	2	3	4	5	6	7	8	Final
Slovenia (Tisler)	1	0	0	1	1	1	0	X	4
Netherlands (Voskuilen) 🔨	0	0	1	0	0	0	1	X	2

Sheet C	1	2	3	4	5	6	7	8	Final
France (Roux) 🔨	2	0	1	0	2	0	2	X	7
Turkey (Polat)	0	2	0	0	0	3	0	X	5

Sheet D	1	2	3	4	5	6	7	8	Final
Norway (Walstad)	0	0	1	0	1	0	X	X	2
Sweden (Mabergs) 🔨	0	3	0	4	0	2	X	X	9

Sheet E	1	2	3	4	5	6	7	8	Final
Germany (Schöpp) 🔨	1	0	0	1	0	0	1	0	3
Denmark (Dupont)	0	0	1	0	0	2	0	1	4

==== Thursday, September 18 ====
Draw 18 12:00

Sheet B	1	2	3	4	5	6	7	8	9	Final
Austria (Toth) 🔨	0	0	1	0	1	3	0	0	1	6
Turkey (Polat)	0	0	0	3	0	0	1	1	0	5

Sheet C	1	2	3	4	5	6	7	8	Final
Germany (Schöpp) 🔨	1	0	2	1	1	1	0	X	6
Norway (Walstad)	0	0	0	0	0	0	2	X	2

Sheet D	1	2	3	4	5	6	7	8	Final
Netherlands (Voskuilen)	0	0	1	1	0	2	0	2	6
France (Roux) 🔨	2	1	0	0	1	0	1	0	5

Sheet E	1	2	3	4	5	6	7	8	Final
Sweden (Mabergs) 🔨	0	1	1	0	1	0	2	X	5
Slovenia (Tisler)	0	0	0	1	0	2	0	X	3

Draw 20 20:00

Sheet A	1	2	3	4	5	6	7	8	Final
Norway (Walstad) 🔨	1	1	1	0	0	1	2	X	6
Netherlands (Voskuilen)	0	0	0	1	1	0	0	X	2

Sheet C	1	2	3	4	5	6	7	8	Final
Austria (Toth)	0	2	1	0	2	0	1	0	6
Denmark (Dupont) 🔨	2	0	0	3	0	2	0	2	9

Sheet D	1	2	3	4	5	6	7	8	Final
Turkey (Polat)	0	0	0	0	0	1	2	0	4
Germany (Schöpp) 🔨	1	0	1	0	2	0	0	1	5

Sheet E	1	2	3	4	5	6	7	8	Final
France (Roux)	0	1	0	0	0	0	X	X	1
Sweden (Mabergs) 🔨	2	0	0	3	0	0	X	X	5

=== Group B ===
==== Sunday, September 14 ====
Draw 2 12:00

Sheet A	1	2	3	4	5	6	7	8	9	Final
Scotland (Smith) 🔨	1	1	0	2	0	4	0	0	0	8
Czech Republic (Bareš)	0	0	4	0	2	0	1	1	1	9

Sheet B	1	2	3	4	5	6	7	8	Final
Switzerland (Tirinzoni)	2	0	2	4	0	4	X	X	12
Poland (Stych) 🔨	0	1	0	0	1	0	X	X	2

Sheet C	1	2	3	4	5	6	7	8	Final
Slovakia (Misun)	0	2	0	0	0	2	0	1	5
Latvia (Smigla) 🔨	1	0	1	1	1	0	0	0	4

Sheet D	1	2	3	4	5	6	7	8	Final
England (Fowler) 🔨	0	0	0	0	1	0	1	X	2
Russia (Tselousov)	1	1	2	1	0	1	0	X	6

Draw 4 20:00

Sheet B	1	2	3	4	5	6	7	8	Final
England (Fowler) 🔨	0	0	1	2	0	0	2	0	5
Slovakia (Misun)	0	3	0	0	2	0	0	2	7

Sheet C	1	2	3	4	5	6	7	8	Final
Latvia (Smigla)	0	3	1	0	1	0	1	X	6
Scotland (Smith) 🔨	1	0	0	2	0	5	0	X	8

Sheet E	1	2	3	4	5	6	7	8	Final
Czech Republic (Bareš)	0	2	0	0	0	0	0	X	2
Switzerland (Tirinzoni) 🔨	2	0	2	0	1	2	2	X	9

==== Monday, September 15 ====
Draw 6 12:00

Sheet A	1	2	3	4	5	6	7	8	Final
Slovakia (Misun) 🔨	0	0	0	0	0	2	X	X	2
Russia (Tselousov)	2	3	2	2	1	0	X	X	10

Sheet C	1	2	3	4	5	6	7	8	Final
Poland (Stych) 🔨	2	1	0	0	0	0	3	X	6
Czech Republic (Bareš)	0	0	1	0	0	0	0	X	1

Sheet D	1	2	3	4	5	6	7	8	Final
Scotland (Smith)	1	1	1	0	1	0	1	X	5
Switzerland (Tirinzoni) 🔨	0	0	0	1	0	2	0	X	3

Draw 7 16:00

Sheet D	1	2	3	4	5	6	7	8	Final
Latvia (Smigla) 🔨	0	0	2	0	0	1	X	X	3
England (Fowler)	1	1	0	3	2	0	X	X	7

==== Tuesday, September 16 ====
Draw 9 8:00

Sheet A	1	2	3	4	5	6	7	8	Final
Latvia (Smigla) 🔨	0	0	0	3	0	0	1	X	4
Switzerland (Tirinzoni)	1	3	0	0	1	2	0	X	7

Sheet B	1	2	3	4	5	6	7	8	Final
Poland (Stych)	0	2	1	0	0	1	0	0	4
England (Fowler) 🔨	1	0	0	1	2	0	1	1	6

Sheet C	1	2	3	4	5	6	7	8	Final
Scotland (Smith)	0	3	0	2	0	1	0	X	6
Slovakia (Misun) 🔨	2	0	1	0	0	0	1	X	4

Sheet D	1	2	3	4	5	6	7	8	9	Final
Russia (Tselousov)	0	3	0	2	0	3	0	0	2	10
Czech Republic (Bareš) 🔨	1	0	3	0	1	0	2	1	0	8

Draw 11 16:00

Sheet A	1	2	3	4	5	6	7	8	Final
Russia (Tselousov) 🔨	0	0	3	0	0	1	2	0	6
Poland (Stych)	0	1	0	1	1	0	0	1	4

Sheet E	1	2	3	4	5	6	7	8	Final
Switzerland (Tirinzoni) 🔨	1	0	0	0	3	0	0	1	5
Slovakia (Misun)	0	0	0	0	0	1	1	0	2

==== Wednesday, September 17 ====
Draw 13 8:00

Sheet B	1	2	3	4	5	6	7	8	Final
Czech Republic (Bareš)	0	1	0	1	1	2	0	X	5
Latvia (Smigla) 🔨	1	0	1	0	0	0	1	X	3

Sheet C	1	2	3	4	5	6	7	8	Final
Switzerland (Tirinzoni) 🔨	2	0	0	0	2	0	0	2	6
Russia (Tselousov)	0	1	2	0	0	2	0	0	5

Sheet D	1	2	3	4	5	6	7	8	9	Final
Slovakia (Misun)	0	0	0	0	2	0	0	2	0	4
Poland (Stych) 🔨	1	1	1	0	0	0	1	0	1	5

Sheet E	1	2	3	4	5	6	7	8	Final
England (Fowler)	1	0	0	1	0	0	2	X	4
Scotland (Smith) 🔨	0	1	1	0	2	2	0	X	6

Draw 15 16:00

Sheet C	1	2	3	4	5	6	7	8	Final
Czech Republic (Bareš)	1	0	1	1	1	0	0	0	4
England (Fowler) 🔨	0	1	0	0	0	1	1	0	3

Sheet E	1	2	3	4	5	6	7	8	Final
Scotland (Smith) 🔨	2	1	2	0	2	0	4	X	11
Poland (Stych)	0	0	0	1	0	1	0	X	2

==== Thursday, September 18 ====
Draw 17 8:00

Sheet E	1	2	3	4	5	6	7	8	Final
Latvia (Smigla) 🔨	0	1	0	1	0	1	X	X	3
Russia (Tselousov)	2	0	1	0	6	0	X	X	9

Draw 18 12:00

Sheet A	1	2	3	4	5	6	7	8	Final
Switzerland (Tirinzoni) 🔨	1	0	4	0	2	0	2	X	9
England (Fowler)	0	1	0	1	0	3	0	X	5

Draw 19 16:00

Sheet B	1	2	3	4	5	6	7	8	9	Final
Russia (Tselousov)	1	0	2	0	2	0	0	0	0	5
Scotland (Smith) 🔨	0	2	0	1	0	0	1	1	1	6

Sheet D	1	2	3	4	5	6	7	8	Final
Poland (Stych) 🔨	3	0	0	0	0	0	1	X	4
Latvia (Smigla)	0	2	0	1	3	1	0	X	7

Sheet E	1	2	3	4	5	6	7	8	Final
Slovakia (Misun)	0	1	0	1	0	0	1	X	3
Czech Republic (Bareš) 🔨	1	0	3	0	3	2	0	X	9

=== Group C ===
==== Sunday, September 14 ====
Draw 2 12:00

Sheet E	1	2	3	4	5	6	7	8	Final
Hungary (Nagy) 🔨	1	0	0	0	0	1	1	1	4
Estonia (Lill)	0	1	0	1	1	0	0	0	3

Draw 3 16:00

Sheet E	1	2	3	4	5	6	7	8	Final
Italy (Gonin) 🔨	3	1	1	3	2	3	X	X	13
Romania (Gall)	0	0	0	0	0	0	X	X	0

Draw 4 20:00

Sheet A	1	2	3	4	5	6	7	8	Final
Belarus (Pavlyuchik) 🔨	0	1	0	2	0	1	0	X	4
Spain (Mollinedo)	1	0	3	0	1	0	2	X	7

Sheet D	1	2	3	4	5	6	7	8	Final
Wales (Meikle)	0	0	0	1	0	0	0	X	1
Finland (Rantamäki) 🔨	3	0	0	0	0	0	2	X	5

==== Monday, September 15 ====
Draw 6 12:00

Sheet B	1	2	3	4	5	6	7	8	Final
Hungary (Nagy) 🔨	2	1	2	1	0	1	X	X	7
Italy (Gonin)	0	0	0	0	1	0	X	X	1

Sheet E	1	2	3	4	5	6	7	8	Final
Wales (Meikle) 🔨	0	2	0	1	0	4	0	0	7
Belarus (Pavlyuchik)	1	0	2	0	2	0	0	1	6

Draw 8 20:00

Sheet B	1	2	3	4	5	6	7	8	Final
Estonia (Lill)	0	1	0	1	0	2	1	0	5
Wales (Meikle) 🔨	1	0	3	0	1	0	0	2	7

Sheet C	1	2	3	4	5	6	7	8	Final
Belarus (Pavlyuchik)	3	2	1	2	4	2	X	X	14
Romania (Gall) 🔨	0	0	0	0	0	0	X	X	0

Sheet D	1	2	3	4	5	6	7	8	Final
Finland (Rantamäki) 🔨	2	0	2	0	0	2	1	0	7
Hungary (Nagy)	0	2	0	1	2	0	0	3	8

Sheet E	1	2	3	4	5	6	7	8	Final
Spain (Mollinedo) 🔨	1	0	2	0	1	0	0	X	4
Italy (Gonin)	0	3	0	2	0	3	1	X	9

==== Tuesday, September 16 ====
Draw 10 12:00

Sheet A	1	2	3	4	5	6	7	8	Final
Spain (Mollinedo)	0	0	1	0	0	1	0	X	2
Finland (Rantamäki) 🔨	2	0	0	0	2	0	0	X	4

Sheet B	1	2	3	4	5	6	7	8	Final
Belarus (Pavlyuchik)	0	0	1	0	0	0	X	X	1
Hungary (Nagy) 🔨	1	1	0	0	4	2	X	X	8

Sheet C	1	2	3	4	5	6	7	8	Final
Wales (Meikle)	0	2	0	1	1	0	0	X	4
Italy (Gonin) 🔨	2	0	2	0	0	4	1	X	9

Sheet D	1	2	3	4	5	6	7	8	Final
Romania (Gall) 🔨	1	0	0	0	0	0	X	X	1
Estonia (Lill)	0	3	4	3	1	0	X	X	11

Draw 12 20:00

Sheet A	1	2	3	4	5	6	7	8	Final
Italy (Gonin) 🔨	2	0	3	1	0	3	0	2	11
Estonia (Lill)	0	4	0	0	1	0	3	0	8

Sheet C	1	2	3	4	5	6	7	8	Final
Finland (Rantamäki)	1	0	0	0	3	0	0	1	5
Belarus (Pavlyuchik) 🔨	0	0	1	1	0	2	0	0	4

Sheet D	1	2	3	4	5	6	7	8	Final
Hungary (Nagy) 🔨	0	1	2	2	0	0	3	X	8
Spain (Mollinedo)	1	0	0	0	1	1	0	X	3

Sheet E	1	2	3	4	5	6	7	8	Final
Romania (Gall) 🔨	2	0	0	0	0	0	X	X	2
Wales (Meikle)	0	3	2	3	2	4	X	X	14

==== Wednesday, September 17 ====
Draw 14 12:00

Sheet E	1	2	3	4	5	6	7	8	9	Final
Estonia (Lill) 🔨	0	0	1	3	0	1	0	2	0	7
Finland (Rantamäki)	1	1	0	0	3	0	2	0	1	8

Draw 15 16:00

Sheet A	1	2	3	4	5	6	7	8	Final
Wales (Meikle)	0	1	0	0	0	1	0	X	2
Hungary (Nagy) 🔨	3	0	1	1	1	0	3	X	9

Sheet B	1	2	3	4	5	6	7	8	Final
Romania (Gall)	0	0	1	0	0	0	X	X	1
Spain (Mollinedo) 🔨	4	1	0	5	1	2	X	X	13

Sheet D	1	2	3	4	5	6	7	8	9	Final
Belarus (Pavlyuchik) 🔨	0	1	0	1	0	1	0	2	0	5
Italy (Gonin)	0	0	1	0	2	0	2	0	1	6

==== Thursday, September 18 ====
Draw 17 8:00

Sheet A	1	2	3	4	5	6	7	8	Final
Estonia (Lill)	1	0	0	1	0	2	0	2	6
Belarus (Pavlyuchik) 🔨	0	1	1	0	2	0	1	0	5

Sheet B	1	2	3	4	5	6	7	8	Final
Italy (Gonin) 🔨	0	2	0	1	0	1	0	0	4
Finland (Rantamäki)	0	0	1	0	3	0	2	2	8

Sheet C	1	2	3	4	5	6	7	8	Final
Romania (Gall)	0	0	0	0	1	0	X	X	1
Hungary (Nagy) 🔨	5	5	1	3	0	1	X	X	15

Sheet D	1	2	3	4	5	6	7	8	Final
Spain (Mollinedo) 🔨	2	0	1	0	0	2	0	1	6
Wales (Meikle)	0	1	0	1	1	0	2	0	5

Draw 19 16:00

Sheet A	1	2	3	4	5	6	7	8	Final
Finland (Rantamäki) 🔨	2	1	1	3	1	0	X	X	8
Romania (Gall)	0	0	0	0	0	1	X	X	1

Sheet C	1	2	3	4	5	6	7	8	Final
Spain (Mollinedo)	0	0	1	0	1	0	2	0	4
Estonia (Lill) 🔨	0	3	0	0	0	3	0	2	8

== Tiebreaker ==
Friday, September 19, 10:00

Sheet C	1	2	3	4	5	6	7	8	Final
Germany (Schöpp) 🔨	0	0	1	0	1	1	0	0	3
Norway (Walstad)	0	0	0	1	0	0	1	2	4

== Playoffs ==
Qualification Game
C3	Italy	4
A3	Norway	7

Quarterfinals
A1	Denmark	3
B2	Switzerland	7
A2	Sweden	6
B3	Russia	5
B1	Scotland	7
C2	Finland	5
C1	Hungary	3
A3	Norway	5

Semifinals
B2	Switzerland	2
A2	Sweden	4
B1	Scotland	4
A3	Norway	5

Gold Medal Game
A2	Sweden	9
A3	Norway	2

Bronze Medal Game
B2	Switzerland	7
B1	Scotland	5

=== Qualification Game ===
Friday, September 19, 14:30

Sheet B	1	2	3	4	5	6	7	8	Final
Italy (Gonin)	0	3	0	0	1	0	0	0	4
Norway (Walstad) 🔨	2	0	1	1	0	1	0	2	7

=== Quarterfinals ===
Friday, September 19, 19:00

Sheet A	1	2	3	4	5	6	7	8	Final
Denmark (Dupont) 🔨	1	0	1	0	0	1	0	X	3
Switzerland (Tirinzoni)	0	2	0	2	0	0	3	X	7

Sheet B	1	2	3	4	5	6	7	8	Final
Scotland (Smith)	0	0	0	3	0	3	0	1	7
Finland (Rantamäki) 🔨	0	1	1	0	2	0	1	0	5

Sheet D	1	2	3	4	5	6	7	8	Final
Sweden (Mabergs) 🔨	1	0	2	0	1	0	0	2	6
Russia (Tselousov)	0	0	0	3	0	1	1	0	5

Sheet E	1	2	3	4	5	6	7	8	Final
Hungary (Nagy) 🔨	0	0	0	1	1	0	1	X	3
Norway (Walstad)	0	1	2	0	0	2	0	X	5

=== Semifinals ===
Saturday, September 20, 10:00

Sheet E	1	2	3	4	5	6	7	8	Final
Switzerland (Tirinzoni)	0	1	0	1	0	0	0	0	2
Sweden (Mabergs) 🔨	1	0	1	0	1	0	0	1	4

Sheet C	1	2	3	4	5	6	7	8	Final
Scotland (Smith) 🔨	2	1	0	1	0	0	0	0	4
Norway (Walstad)	0	0	1	0	0	1	2	1	5

=== Bronze medal game ===
Saturday, September 20, 15:00

Sheet D	1	2	3	4	5	6	7	8	Final
Switzerland (Tirinzoni)	0	2	0	2	0	2	0	1	7
Scotland (Smith) 🔨	1	0	2	0	1	0	1	0	5

=== Gold medal game ===
Saturday, September 20, 15:00

Sheet B	1	2	3	4	5	6	7	8	Final
Sweden (Mabergs)	1	4	0	3	0	1	X	X	9
Norway (Walstad)	0	0	1	0	1	0	X	X	2

2014 European Mixed Curling Championship
(Sweden)
Sweden
1st title
