= Patric Mabergs =

Swedish curler

- Curler ♂
- Born: 18 February 1992 (age 34); Malung

Team
- Curling club: Skellefteå CK, Skellefteå
- Skip: Fredrik Nyman
- Third: Patric Mabergs
- Second: Simon Granbom
- Lead: Johannes Patz

Curling career
- Member Association: Sweden
- Other appearances: World Mixed Championship: 1 (2019), European Mixed Championship: 1 (2014), World Junior Championships: 3 (2010, 2012, 2013), Winter Universiade: 2 (2015, 2017)
Medal record
Curling
Swedish Men's Championship
Gold medal – first place	2024
Gold medal – first place	2026
Silver medal – second place	2013
Silver medal – second place	2014
Silver medal – second place	2016
Bronze medal – third place	2015
Bronze medal – third place	2023
Bronze medal – third place	2025
World Junior Championships
Silver medal – second place	2012 Östersund
Winter Universiade
Silver medal – second place	Almaty 2017
European Mixed Championship
Gold medal – first place	2014 Copenhagen

Bygg Mats Patric Mabergs (born 18 February 1992 in Malung) is a Swedish curler.

He is a 2014 European mixed curling champion and a two-time Swedish mixed curling champion (2014, 2017).

== Teams ==
=== Men's ===
Season	Skip	Third	Second	Lead	Alternate	Coach	Events
2009–10	Patric Mabergs	Gustav Eskilsson	Jesper Johansson	Victor Herlin	Johannes Patz (WJCC)	Per Sjöström	SJCC 2010 (gold); WJCC 2010 (6th)
2011–12	Patric Mabergs (fourth)	Gustav Eskilsson (skip)	Jesper Johansson	Johannes Patz			
2011–12	Rasmus Wranå	Jordan Wåhlin	Daniel Lövstrand	Axel Sjöberg	Patric Mabergs	Mats Wranå	WJCC 2012 (silver)
2012–13	Patric Mabergs (fourth)	Gustav Eskilsson (skip)	Jesper Johansson	Johannes Patz	Fredrik Nyman (WJCC)	Flemming Patz	SJCC 2013 (gold); WJCC 2013 (4th)
2012–13	Gustav Eskilsson	Patric Mabergs	Jesper Johansson	Johannes Patz			SMCC 2013 (silver)
2013–14	Patric Mabergs (fourth)	Gustav Eskilsson (skip)	Jesper Johansson	Johannes Patz		Flemming Patz	SMCC 2014 (silver)
2014–15	Patric Mabergs (fourth)	Gustav Eskilsson (skip)	Jesper Johansson	Johannes Patz		Flemming Patz	WUG 2015 (4th); SMCC 2015 (bronze)
2015–16	Patric Mabergs (fourth)	Gustav Eskilsson (skip)	Jesper Johansson	Johannes Patz			SMCC 2016 (silver)
2016–17	Patric Mabergs (fourth)	Gustav Eskilsson (skip)	Fredrik Nyman	Johannes Patz		Flemming Patz	WUG 2017 (silver)
2017–18	Patric Mabergs	Fredrik Nyman	Vincent Stenberg	Johannes Patz			SMCC 2018 (7th)
2018–19	Patric Mabergs	Niclas Johansson	André Winther	Jonathan Holm			SMCC 2019 (9th)
2019–20	Patric Mabergs	Fredrik Nyman	Fredrik Carlsen	Johannes Patz			
2022–23	Fredrik Nyman	Patric Mabergs	Simon Olofsson	Johannes Patz			
2025–26	Fredrik Nyman	Patric Mabergs	Simon Olofsson	Johannes Patz		Rickard Hallström	
2026–27	Fredrik Nyman	Patric Mabergs	Simon Granbom	Johannes Patz		Rickard Hallström	

=== Mixed ===
Season	Skip	Third	Second	Lead	Alternate	Coach	Events
2012–13	Patric Mabergs	Sofia Mabergs	Mats Mabergs	Monika Mabergs			SMxCC 2013 (???th)
2013–14	Patric Mabergs	Isabella Wranå	Johannes Patz	Sofia Mabergs			SMxCC 2014 (gold)
2014–15	Patric Mabergs	Isabella Wranå	Johannes Patz	Sofia Mabergs		Mats Wranå	EMxCC 2014 (gold)
2014–15	Patric Mabergs	Sofia Mabergs	Mats Mabergs	Monika Mabergs			SMxCC 2015 (bronze)
2015–16	Patric Mabergs	Isabella Wranå	Johannes Patz	Sofia Mabergs	Fanny Sjöberg		SMxCC 2016 (bronze)
2016–17	Patric Mabergs	Isabella Wranå	Johannes Patz	Sofia Mabergs		Flemming Patz	SMxCC 2017 (gold)
2017–18	Patric Mabergs	Isabella Wranå	Johannes Patz	Sofia Mabergs		Flemming Patz	WMxCC 2017 (5th)
2017–18	Patric Mabergs (fourth)	Johanna Heldin	Kristian Lindström (skip)	Anna Gustafsson			SMxCC 2018 (bronze)

== Personal life ==
His younger sister is Swedish, European and Olympic curler champion Sofia Scharback, née Mabergs.
