= Simon Olofsson =

Swedish curler (born 1999)

- Curler
- Born: 22 April 1999 (age 27); Uppsala, Sweden

Team
- Curling club: Härnösands CK, Härnösand
- Skip: Oskar Eriksson
- Third: Rasmus Wranå
- Second: Simon Olofsson
- Lead: Christoffer Sundgren

Curling career
- Member Association: Sweden
- World Championship: 2 (2025, 2026)
- European Championship: 3 (2022, 2025, 2026)
- Olympic: 1 (2026)
- Other appearances: 1 (2019 World Mixed Championship)
Medal record
Curling
World Championships
| Gold medal – first place | 2026 Ogden |
European Curling Championships
| Gold medal – first place | 2025 Lohja |
| Bronze medal – third place | 2026 Ostrava |
Swedish Men's Championship
| Gold medal – first place | 2024 |
| Bronze medal – third place | 2023 |
| Bronze medal – third place | 2025 |

Simon Olofsson (born 22 April 1999) is a Swedish curler. He currently plays second on Team Oskar Eriksson.

He is the 2026 World Champion and 2025 European Champion. He is also a 2019 Swedish mixed curling champion and skipped the Swedish team at the 2019 World Mixed Curling Championship.

== Personal life ==
Olofsson attended Uppsala University. As of 2025 he was an engineering student.

== Teams ==
=== Men's ===
| Season | Skip | Third | Second | Lead | Alternate | Events |
|---|---|---|---|---|---|---|
| 2015–16 | Johan Engqvist | Simon Olofsson | Isak Stener | Ture Stenvall | Hannes Lindquist | SJCC 2016 (7th) |
| 2016–17 | Johan Engqvist | Simon Olofsson | Isak Stener | Ture Stenvall | Hannes Lindquist | SJCC 2017 (4th) |
| 2017–18 | Johan Engqvist | Simon Olofsson | Isak Stener | Ture Stenvall | Hannes Lindquist | SJCC 2018 (6th) |
| 2018–19 | Johan Engqvist | Simon Olofsson | Isak Stener | Ture Stenvall | Hannes Lindquist | SJCC 2019 (4th); SMCC 2019 (7th) |
| 2020–21 | Fredrik Nyman | Albin Eriksson | Simon Olofsson | Johannes Patz | | |
| 2021–22 | Fredrik Nyman | Albin Eriksson | Simon Olofsson | Johannes Patz | | |
| 2022–23 | Fredrik Nyman | Patric Mabergs | Simon Olofsson | Johannes Patz | | |
| 2025–26 | Niklas Edin | Oskar Eriksson | Rasmus Wranå | Christoffer Sundgren | Simon Olofsson | ECC 2025 (gold); WOG 2026 (9th); WCC 2026 (gold) |
| 2026–27 | Oskar Eriksson | Rasmus Wranå | Simon Olofsson | Christoffer Sundgren | | |

=== Mixed ===
| Season | Skip | Third | Second | Lead | Alternate | Coach | Events |
|---|---|---|---|---|---|---|---|
| 2015–16 | Emma Landelius (fourth) | Gustav Köhn | Emma Moberg (skip) | Simon Olofsson | | Kasper Gullbring | SMxCC 2016 (17th) |
| 2016–17 | Emma Landelius (fourth) | Simon Olofsson | Emma Moberg (skip) | Albert Jonsson | Johan Engqvist | | SMxCC 2017 (13th) |
| 2018–19 | Simon Olofsson | Vilma Åhlström | Axel Sjöberg | Linda Stenlund | Hannes Lindquist | Hannes Lindquist | SMxCC 2019 (gold) |
| 2019–20 | Simon Olofsson | Vilma Åhlström | Axel Sjöberg | Linda Stenlund | | Mathias Mabergs | WMxCC 2019 (9th) |
