= World Mixed Curling Championship =

World championship for mixed curling

- Established: 2015
- 2027 host city: Penticton, Canada
- 2027 arena: Penticton Curling Club
- 2024 champion: Sweden

Current edition
- 2024 World Mixed Curling Championship

The World Mixed Curling Championship is the world championship for mixed curling. It is typically held annually in the autumn, and replaced the European Mixed Curling Championship.

== Results ==
The results are listed as follows:

Year	Location	Final			Third-place match
Year	Location	Champion	Score	Second place	Third place	Score	Fourth place
2015	(Switzerland) Bern	Norway; Steffen Walstad; Julie Molnar; Sander Rølvåg; Pia Trulsen	5–3	Sweden; Rasmus Wranå; Zandra Flyg; Joakim Flyg; Johanna Heldin	China; Ji Yansong; Zheng Chunmei; Guo Wenli; Gao Xuesong	5–4	Russia; Alexey Tselousov; Uliana Vasileva; Evgeny Klimov; Ekaterina Kuzmina
2016	(Russia) Kazan	Russia; Alexander Krushelnitskiy; Anastasia Bryzgalova; Daniil Goriachev; Maria Duyunova	5–4	Sweden; Kristian Lindström; Jennie Wåhlin; Joakim Flyg; Johanna Heldin	Scotland; Cameron Bryce; Katie Murray; Bobby Lammie; Sophie Jackson	8–4	South Korea; Lee Ki-bok; Yeo Eun-byeol; Seong Yu-jin; Ahn Jeong-yeon
2017	(Switzerland) Champéry	Scotland; Grant Hardie; Rhiann Macleod; Billy Morton; Barbara McFarlane	8–5	Canada; Trevor Bonot; Jacqueline McCormick; Kory Carr; Megan Carr	Czech Republic; Jaroslav Vedral; Andrea Krupanska; Lukáš Klípa; Denisa Postova	7–6	Norway; Wilhelm Næss; Ingvild Skaga (skip); Martin Sesaker; Eirin Mesloe
2018	(Canada) Kelowna	Canada; Michael Anderson; Danielle Inglis; Sean Harrison; Lauren Harrison	6–2	Spain; Sergio Vez; Oihane Otaegi; Mikel Unanue; Leire Otaegi	Russia; Alexander Eremin; Maria Komarova; Daniil Goriachev; Anastasia Moskaleva	8–7	Norway; Wilhelm Naess; Ingvild Skaga (skip); Martin Sesaker; Eirin Mesloe
2019	(Scotland) Aberdeen	Canada; Colin Kurz; Meghan Walter; Brendan Bilawka; Sara Oliver	6–5	Germany; Andy Kapp; Pia-Lisa Schöll; Benny Kapp; Petra Tschetsch	Norway; Wilhelm Næss; Ingvild Skaga (skip); Harald Skarsheim Rian; Eirin Mesloe	6–5	South Korea; Seong Yu-jin; Jang Hye-ji; Jeon Jae-ik; Song Yu-jin
2020	(Scotland) Aberdeen	cancelled			cancelled
2021	(Scotland) Aberdeen	cancelled			cancelled
2022	(Scotland) Aberdeen	Canada; Jean-Michel Ménard; Marie-France Larouche; Ian Belleau; Annie Lemay	7–4	Scotland; Cameron Bryce; Lisa Davie; Scott Hyslop; Robyn Munro	Switzerland; Yves Hess; Ursi Hegner (skip); Simon Hoehn; Chantal Schmid	6–4	Sweden; Robin Ahlberg; Therese Westman (skip); Johannes Patz; Mikaela Altebro
2023	(Scotland) Aberdeen	Sweden; Johan Nygren; Jennie Wåhlin; Fredrik Carlsén; Fanny Sjöberg	8–2	Spain; Sergio Vez; Oihane Otaegi; Mikel Unanue; Leire Otaegi	Canada; Félix Asselin; Laurie St-Georges; Émile Asselin; Emily Riley	4–3	Norway; Steffen Walstad; Maia Ramsfjell; Andreas Hårstad; Eirin Mesloe
2024	(Scotland) Aberdeen	Sweden; Simon Granbom; Rebecka Thunman; Johannes Patz; Mikaela Altebro	5–4	Japan; Shun Ichitsubo; Hinako Hase (skip); Hiroki Hasegawa; Chihiro Tokoyoda	Switzerland; Yves Wagenseil; Nora Wüest (skip); Dieter Wüest; Marion Wüest	4–2	Spain; Sergio Vez; Oihane Otaegi; Mikel Unanue; Leire Otaegi
2025	Not Held	Not Held			Not Held
2027 (Apr.) (Note: The 2026 World Mixed Curling Championship was postponed until April 2027, resulting in two World Mixed Championships being held in 2027, with the second scheduled for October.)	(Canada) Penticton		–			–
2027 (Oct.)	(Canada) Vernon		–			–
2029	(Canada) Vernon		–			–

== All-time medal table ==
As of the 2024 World Mixed Curling Championship

Rank	Nation	Gold	Silver	Bronze	Total
1	Canada	3	1	1	5
2	Sweden	2	2	0	4
3	Scotland	1	1	1	3
4	Norway	1	0	1	2
4	Russia	1	0	1	2
6	Spain	0	2	0	2
7	Germany	0	1	0	1
7	Japan	0	1	0	1
9	Switzerland	0	0	2	2
10	China	0	0	1	1
10	Czech Republic	0	0	1	1
Totals (11 entries)		8	8	8	24

== See also ==
- World Curling Championships
- European Mixed Curling Championship
