= Johannes Patz =

Swedish curler

- Curler
- Born: 3 July 1993 (age 33); Stockholm

Team
- Curling club: Sollefteå CK, Sollefteå
- Skip: Fredrik Nyman
- Third: Patric Mabergs
- Second: Simon Granbom
- Lead: Johannes Patz

Curling career
- Member Association: Sweden
- World Mixed Championship: 2 (2019, 2024)
- Other appearances: European Mixed Championship: 1 (2014), World Junior Championships: 4 (2010, 2013, 2014, 2015), Winter Universiade: 2 (2015, 2017)
Medal record
Curling
Representing Sweden
World Mixed Championship
| Gold medal – first place | 2024 Aberdeen |
World Junior Championships
| Silver medal – second place | 2012 Östersund |
Winter Universiade
| Silver medal – second place | Almaty 2017 |
European Mixed Championship
| Gold medal – first place | 2014 Copenhagen |
Swedish Men's Championship
| Gold medal – first place | 2024 |
| Gold medal – first place | 2026 |
| Silver medal – second place | 2013 |
| Silver medal – second place | 2014 |
| Silver medal – second place | 2016 |
| Bronze medal – third place | 2015 |
| Bronze medal – third place | 2019 |
| Bronze medal – third place | 2023 |
| Bronze medal – third place | 2025 |

Ulrik Fredrik Johannes Patz (born 3 July 1993 in Stockholm) is a Swedish curler.

He is a 2014 European mixed curling champion, a three-time Swedish mixed curling champion (2014, 2017, 2024) and World Mixed Curling Champion 2024.

== Teams ==
=== Men's ===
| Season | Skip | Third | Second | Lead | Alternate | Coach | Events |
|---|---|---|---|---|---|---|---|
| 2009–10 | Patric Mabergs | Gustav Eskilsson | Jesper Johansson | Victor Herlin | Johannes Patz | Per Sjöström | WJCC 2010 (6th) |
| 2011–12 | Patric Mabergs (fourth) | Gustav Eskilsson (skip) | Jesper Johansson | Johannes Patz | | | |
| 2012–13 | Patric Mabergs (fourth) | Gustav Eskilsson (skip) | Jesper Johansson | Johannes Patz | Fredrik Nyman (WJCC) | Flemming Patz | SJCC 2013 (gold); WJCC 2013 (4th) |
| 2012–13 | Gustav Eskilsson | Patric Mabergs | Jesper Johansson | Johannes Patz | | | SMCC 2013 (silver) |
| 2013–14 | Patric Mabergs (fourth) | Gustav Eskilsson (skip) | Jesper Johansson | Johannes Patz | | Flemming Patz | SMCC 2014 (silver) |
| 2013–14 | Fredrik Nyman | Simon Granbom | Johannes Patz | Victor Martinsson | Max Bäck (WJCC) | Hans Nyman | SJCC 2014 (gold); WJCC 2014 (6th) |
| 2014–15 | Patric Mabergs (fourth) | Gustav Eskilsson (skip) | Jesper Johansson | Johannes Patz | | Flemming Patz | WUG 2015 (4th); SMCC 2015 (bronze) |
| 2014–15 | Fredrik Nyman | Simon Granbom | Johannes Patz | Victor Martinsson | Max Bäck (WJCC) | Hans Nyman | SJCC 2015 (gold); WJCC 2015 (4th) |
| 2015–16 | Patric Mabergs (fourth) | Gustav Eskilsson (skip) | Jesper Johansson | Johannes Patz | | | SMCC 2016 (silver) |
| 2016–17 | Patric Mabergs (fourth) | Gustav Eskilsson (skip) | Fredrik Nyman | Johannes Patz | | Flemming Patz | WUG 2017 (silver) |
| 2017–18 | Patric Mabergs | Fredrik Nyman | Vincent Stenberg | Johannes Patz | | | SMCC 2018 (7th) |
| 2018–19 | Cameron Bryce | Simon Granbom | Johannes Patz | Filip Stener | | | SMCC 2019 (bronze) |
| 2019–20 | Patric Mabergs | Fredrik Nyman | Fredrik Carlsen | Johannes Patz | | | |
| 2020–21 | Fredrik Nyman | Albin Eriksson | Simon Olofsson | Johannes Patz | | | |
| 2021–22 | Fredrik Nyman | Albin Eriksson | Simon Olofsson | Johannes Patz | | | |
| 2022–23 | Fredrik Nyman | Patric Mabergs | Simon Olofsson | Johannes Patz | | | |
| 2025–26 | Fredrik Nyman | Patric Mabergs | Simon Olofsson | Johannes Patz | | Rickard Hallström | |
| 2026–27 | Fredrik Nyman | Patric Mabergs | Simon Granbom | Johannes Patz | | Rickard Hallström | |

=== Mixed ===
| Season | Skip | Third | Second | Lead | Alternate | Coach | Events |
|---|---|---|---|---|---|---|---|
| 2013–14 | Patric Mabergs | Isabella Wranå | Johannes Patz | Sofia Mabergs | | | SMxCC 2014 (gold) |
| 2014–15 | Patric Mabergs | Isabella Wranå | Johannes Patz | Sofia Mabergs | | Mats Wranå | EMxCC 2014 (gold) |
| 2015–16 | Patric Mabergs | Isabella Wranå | Johannes Patz | Sofia Mabergs | Fanny Sjöberg | | SMxCC 2016 (bronze) |
| 2016–17 | Patric Mabergs | Isabella Wranå | Johannes Patz | Sofia Mabergs | | Flemming Patz | SMxCC 2017 (gold) |
| 2017–18 | Patric Mabergs | Isabella Wranå | Johannes Patz | Sofia Mabergs | | Flemming Patz | WMxCC 2017 (5th) |
| 2017–18 | Victor Martinsson (fourth) | Therese Westman | Johannes Patz | Anette Norberg (skip) | | | SMxCC 2018 (5th) |
| 2018–19 | Robin Ahlberg (fourth) | Therese Westman | Johannes Patz | Anette Norberg (skip) | | | SMxCC 2019 (silver) |
| 2024-25 | Simon Granbom (Skip) | Rebecka Thunman | Johannes Patz | Mikaela Altebro | | | WMxCC 2024 (gold) |

=== Mixed doubles ===
| Season | Male | Female | Events |
|---|---|---|---|
| 2013–14 | Johannes Patz | Anna Gustafsson | SMDCC 2014 (13th) |
| 2015–16 | Johannes Patz | Anna Gustafsson | SMDCC 2016 (13th) |
| 2018–19 | Johannes Patz | Emma Sjödin | SMDCC 2019 (7th) |

== Personal life ==
Johannes Patz from well known Swedish family of curlers, which includes his father Flemming (who is also a coach), his mother Susanne, his two uncles (brothers of Susanne) Rickard (also a coach) and Fredrik as well as his aunt (sister of Flemming) Christina. The curling interest in the family started with the great grandfather of Johannes, John Hallström, and the interest was shared by his son Mats and his wife Mona .
