= 2025 Canadian Open (curling) =

Grand Slam of Curling event

2025 HearingLife Canadian Open
- Host city: Saskatoon, Saskatchewan
- Arena: Merlis Belsher Place
- Dates: December 16–21
- Men's winner: (Switzerland) Team Schwaller
- Curling club: CC3C Genève, Geneva
- Skip: Yannick Schwaller
- Fourth: Benoît Schwarz-van Berkel
- Second: Sven Michel
- Lead: Pablo Lachat-Couchepin
- Coach: Glenn Howard
- Finalist: (Scotland) Ross Whyte
- Women's winner: (Switzerland) Team Tirinzoni
- Curling club: CC Aarau, Aarau
- Skip: Silvana Tirinzoni
- Fourth: Alina Pätz
- Second: Carole Howald
- Lead: Selina Witschonke
- Coach: Pierre Charette
- Finalist: (Japan) Satsuki Fujisawa

The 2025 HearingLife Canadian Open was held from December 16 to 21 at the Merlis Belsher Place in Saskatoon, Saskatchewan, with the Tier 2 event held at the Martensville Curling Club in Martensville, Saskatchewan. It was the fourth Grand Slam event and third major of the 2025–26 curling season.

The 2025 event featured a Tier 2 division for the first time. Of note, between the Tier 1 and 2 events, 19 of the 20 men's and women's teams that will participate in the 2026 Winter Olympics played in the event, the exception being the United States' Tabitha Peterson who qualified, but declined the invitation.

== Qualification ==
The Canadian Open consists of two tiers of 16 teams. For Tier 1, the top 14 ranked men's and women's teams on the World Curling Federation's world team rankings as of November 11, 2025, qualified for the event. The final two spots went to sponsor's exemptions chosen by the Grand Slam of Curling. Once the Tier 1 field was confirmed, Tier 2 invites were sent out to the next twelve ranked teams. The final spots in the Tier 2 event were filled by sponsor's exemptions and winners of berth bonspiels held throughout the fall tour season.

=== Men ===
==== Tier 1 ====
Top world team ranking men's teams:

World Team Rankings teams:

1. (Scotland) Bruce Mouat
2. (Manitoba) Matt Dunstone
3. (Alberta) Brad Jacobs
4. (Switzerland) Yannick Schwaller
5. (Scotland) Ross Whyte
6. (Ontario) John Epping
7. (Italy) Joël Retornaz
8. (United States) Daniel Casper
9. (Scotland) Kyle Waddell
10. (United States) John Shuster
11. (Saskatchewan) Mike McEwen
12. (Sweden) Niklas Edin
13. (Switzerland) Marco Hösli
14. (Germany) Marc Muskatewitz

Sponsor's exemption:

- (Newfoundland and Labrador) Brad Gushue
- (Saskatchewan) Rylan Kleiter

==== Tier 2 ====
World Team Rankings teams:

1. (China) Xu Xiaoming
2. (Norway) Magnus Ramsfjell
3. (Manitoba) Reid Carruthers
4. (Japan) Tsuyoshi Yamaguchi
5. (Scotland) ~~Cameron Bryce~~
6. (Manitoba) Jordon McDonald
7. (United States) Korey Dropkin
8. (Czech Republic) Lukáš Klíma
9. (Ontario) Sam Mooibroek
10. (Switzerland) ~~Yves Stocker~~
11. (Netherlands) ~~Wouter Gösgens~~
12. (Japan) Takumi Maeda
13. (Alberta) Kevin Koe
14. (Ontario) ~~Jayden King~~
15. (Alberta) ~~Evan van Amsterdam~~
16. (Switzerland) Michael Brunner
17. (Ontario) Mark Kean

Sponsor's exemption:

- (Saskatchewan) Dustin Kalthoff
- (Italy) Giacomo Colli

Berth Bonspiel winners:

- (Saskatchewan) Kelly Knapp
- (Saskatchewan) Dylan Derksen

=== Women ===
==== Tier 1 ====
Top world team ranking women's teams:

World Team Rankings teams:

1. (Ontario) Rachel Homan
2. (Switzerland) Silvana Tirinzoni
3. (South Korea) Gim Eun-ji
4. (Switzerland) Xenia Schwaller
5. (South Korea) Ha Seung-youn
6. (Sweden) Anna Hasselborg
7. (Japan) Momoha Tabata
8. (Manitoba) Kerri Einarson
9. (South Korea) Kim Eun-jung
10. (Japan) Sayaka Yoshimura
11. (Japan) Satsuki Fujisawa
12. (China) Wang Rui
13. (Japan) Ikue Kitazawa
14. (South Korea) Kang Bo-bae

Sponsor's exemption:

- (Scotland) Rebecca Morrison
- (Italy) Stefania Constantini

==== Tier 2 ====
World Team Rankings teams:

1. (Sweden) Isabella Wranå
2. (Denmark) Madeleine Dupont
3. (Manitoba) Kaitlyn Lawes
4. (United States) ~~Tabitha Peterson~~
5. (British Columbia) Corryn Brown
6. (Manitoba) Kate Cameron
7. (Alberta) Serena Gray-Withers
8. (British Columbia) Kayla MacMillan
9. (British Columbia) Taylor Reese-Hansen
10. (Japan) Miyu Ueno
11. (South Korea) Park You-been
12. (Alberta) Kayla Skrlik
13. (Ontario) Hollie Duncan
14. (Nova Scotia) Christina Black

Sponsor's exemption:

- (Saskatchewan) Ashley Thevenot
- (Saskatchewan) Kamdyn Bauldic

Berth Bonspiel winner:

- (Saskatchewan) Nancy Martin

== Men ==
=== Tier 1 ===
==== Teams ====
The teams are listed as follows:

Skip	Third	Second	Lead	Alternate	Locale
Daniel Casper	Luc Violette	Ben Richardson	Aidan Oldenburg	Rich Ruohonen	(United States) Chaska, Minnesota
Matt Dunstone	Colton Lott	E. J. Harnden	Ryan Harnden		Winnipeg, Manitoba
Niklas Edin	Oskar Eriksson	Rasmus Wranå	Christoffer Sundgren		Karlstad, Sweden
John Epping	Jacob Horgan	Tanner Horgan	Ian McMillan		Sudbury, Ontario
Brad Gushue	Mark Nichols	Brendan Bottcher	Geoff Walker		St. John's, Newfoundland and Labrador
Philipp Hösli (Fourth)	Marco Hösli (Skip)	Simon Gloor	Justin Hausherr		Glarus, Switzerland
Brad Jacobs	Marc Kennedy	Brett Gallant	Ben Hebert		Calgary, Alberta
Rylan Kleiter	Matthew Hall	Joshua Mattern	Trevor Johnson		Saskatoon, Saskatchewan
Mike McEwen	Colton Flasch	Kevin Marsh	Dan Marsh		Saskatoon, Saskatchewan
Bruce Mouat	Grant Hardie	Bobby Lammie	Hammy McMillan Jr.		Edinburgh, Scotland
Marc Muskatewitz	Benjamin Kapp	Felix Messenzehl	Johannes Scheuerl	Mario Trevisiol	Füssen, Germany
Joël Retornaz	Amos Mosaner	Sebastiano Arman	Mattia Giovanella	Ryan Fry (Note: Coach Ryan Fry replaced Amos Mosaner for the tiebreaker and quarterfinal matches.)	Trentino, Italy
Benoît Schwarz-van Berkel (Fourth)	Yannick Schwaller (Skip)	Sven Michel	Pablo Lachat-Couchepin		Geneva, Switzerland
John Shuster	Chris Plys	Colin Hufman	Matt Hamilton		(United States) Duluth, Minnesota
Kyle Waddell	Mark Watt	Angus Bryce	Blair Haswell		Hamilton, Scotland
Ross Whyte	Robin Brydone	Craig Waddell (Note: Alternate Craig Waddell spared for Duncan McFadzean.)	Euan Kyle		Stirling, Scotland

==== Round robin standings ====
Final Round Robin Standings

Key
Teams to Playoffs
Teams to Tiebreaker

Pool A	W	SOW	SOL	L	PF	PA	Pts	LSD
(Scotland) Bruce Mouat	4	0	0	0	30	17	12	80
(Scotland) Kyle Waddell	2	0	0	2	23	19	6	16.9
(United States) Daniel Casper	0	1	0	3	19	31	2	25.2
(Saskatchewan) Rylan Kleiter	0	0	1	3	16	29	1	98

Pool B	W	SOW	SOL	L	PF	PA	Pts	LSD
(United States) John Shuster	3	0	0	1	29	15	9	45.8
(Newfoundland and Labrador) Brad Gushue	2	1	0	1	21	19	8	39.8
(Italy) Joël Retornaz	2	0	0	2	18	20	6	15.6
(Manitoba) Matt Dunstone	0	0	1	3	15	29	1	85.1

Pool C	W	SOW	SOL	L	PF	PA	Pts	LSD
(Alberta) Brad Jacobs	2	1	1	0	26	17	9	133.4
(Germany) Marc Muskatewitz	2	0	1	1	25	27	7	181.2
(Ontario) John Epping	0	2	1	1	25	29	5	137
(Saskatchewan) Mike McEwen	0	1	1	2	20	23	3	95

Pool D	W	SOW	SOL	L	PF	PA	Pts	LSD
(Switzerland) Yannick Schwaller	4	0	0	0	28	11	12	115
(Scotland) Ross Whyte	3	0	0	1	20	16	9	147.8
(Sweden) Niklas Edin	2	0	0	2	22	22	6	89.4
(Switzerland) Marco Hösli	0	0	0	4	17	30	0	42.7

==== Round robin results ====
All draw times are listed in Central Time (UTC−06:00).

===== Draw 1 =====
Tuesday, December 16, 8:00 am

Sheet C	1	2	3	4	5	6	7	8	9	Final
(Ontario) John Epping 🔨	2	0	2	0	1	0	2	0	1	8
(Germany) Marc Muskatewitz	0	3	0	1	0	1	0	2	0	7

Sheet D	1	2	3	4	5	6	7	8	Final
(Scotland) Bruce Mouat	2	1	0	0	3	0	3	X	9
(Switzerland) Marco Hösli 🔨	0	0	2	1	0	2	0	X	5

===== Draw 2 =====
Tuesday, December 16, 11:30 am

Sheet C	1	2	3	4	5	6	7	8	Final
(Manitoba) Matt Dunstone	0	0	2	0	0	1	0	X	3
(United States) John Shuster 🔨	1	2	0	1	1	0	3	X	8

Sheet D	1	2	3	4	5	6	7	8	Final
(Switzerland) Yannick Schwaller	1	2	0	3	0	0	1	X	7
(Saskatchewan) Rylan Kleiter 🔨	0	0	1	0	1	1	0	X	3

===== Draw 3 =====
Tuesday, December 16, 3:00 pm

Sheet C	1	2	3	4	5	6	7	8	9	Final
(Alberta) Brad Jacobs 🔨	0	0	1	2	1	0	0	0	0	4
(Saskatchewan) Mike McEwen	1	1	0	0	0	1	0	1	1	5

Sheet D	1	2	3	4	5	6	7	8	Final
(Scotland) Ross Whyte	0	1	0	1	0	2	1	1	6
(Scotland) Kyle Waddell 🔨	1	0	2	0	1	0	0	0	4

===== Draw 4 =====
Tuesday, December 16, 6:30 pm

Sheet C	1	2	3	4	5	6	7	8	Final
(Italy) Joël Retornaz 🔨	1	1	1	0	1	0	0	0	4
(Newfoundland and Labrador) Brad Gushue	0	0	0	1	0	2	1	2	6

Sheet D	1	2	3	4	5	6	7	8	Final
(United States) Daniel Casper	2	0	0	1	0	0	0	X	3
(Sweden) Niklas Edin 🔨	0	2	2	0	1	1	3	X	9

===== Draw 5 =====
Wednesday, December 17, 8:30 am

Sheet A	1	2	3	4	5	6	7	8	Final
(Switzerland) Yannick Schwaller	1	0	0	2	0	1	1	1	6
(Scotland) Ross Whyte 🔨	0	1	0	0	1	0	0	0	2

Sheet D	1	2	3	4	5	6	7	8	Final
(Saskatchewan) Mike McEwen 🔨	1	0	1	0	1	0	3	0	6
(Germany) Marc Muskatewitz	0	1	0	2	0	3	0	1	7

===== Draw 6 =====
Wednesday, December 17, 12:00 pm

Sheet A	1	2	3	4	5	6	7	8	Final
(Scotland) Bruce Mouat 🔨	3	0	3	0	0	0	1	X	7
(Saskatchewan) Rylan Kleiter	0	1	0	2	0	1	0	X	4

Sheet D	1	2	3	4	5	6	7	8	9	Final
(Alberta) Brad Jacobs 🔨	1	0	2	0	1	0	2	0	1	7
(Ontario) John Epping	0	3	0	1	0	1	0	1	0	6

===== Draw 7 =====
Wednesday, December 17, 4:00 pm

Sheet A	1	2	3	4	5	6	7	8	Final
(United States) Daniel Casper 🔨	1	0	0	2	0	1	0	X	4
(Scotland) Kyle Waddell	0	2	3	0	1	0	2	X	8

Sheet D	1	2	3	4	5	6	7	8	Final
(Manitoba) Matt Dunstone 🔨	2	0	0	1	0	1	0	0	4
(Italy) Joël Retornaz	0	1	1	0	2	0	2	1	7

===== Draw 8 =====
Wednesday, December 17, 8:00 pm

Sheet A	1	2	3	4	5	6	7	8	Final
(Sweden) Niklas Edin	1	0	2	0	4	0	2	X	9
(Switzerland) Marco Hösli 🔨	0	2	0	1	0	1	0	X	4

Sheet D	1	2	3	4	5	6	7	8	Final
(United States) John Shuster 🔨	1	0	0	3	0	0	1	0	5
(Newfoundland and Labrador) Brad Gushue	0	1	2	0	0	2	0	1	6

===== Draw 9 =====
Thursday, December 18, 8:30 am

Sheet B	1	2	3	4	5	6	7	8	Final
(Italy) Joël Retornaz 🔨	0	2	1	0	1	0	1	0	5
(Saskatchewan) Mike McEwen	0	0	0	1	0	1	0	1	3

Sheet C	1	2	3	4	5	6	7	8	Final
(Scotland) Kyle Waddell 🔨	0	1	1	0	1	4	X	X	7
(Saskatchewan) Rylan Kleiter	1	0	0	1	0	0	X	X	2

===== Draw 10 =====
Thursday, December 18, 12:00 pm

Sheet B	1	2	3	4	5	6	7	8	Final
(Manitoba) Matt Dunstone 🔨	0	2	0	2	0	0	X	X	4
(Germany) Marc Muskatewitz	4	0	1	0	2	2	X	X	9

Sheet C	1	2	3	4	5	6	7	8	Final
(Scotland) Bruce Mouat	0	2	3	0	1	0	1	X	7
(United States) Daniel Casper 🔨	1	0	0	2	0	1	0	X	4

===== Draw 11 =====
Thursday, December 18, 4:00 pm

Sheet B	1	2	3	4	5	6	7	8	Final
(Ontario) John Epping	1	0	1	0	0	2	0	X	4
(United States) John Shuster 🔨	0	2	0	2	3	0	2	X	9

Sheet C	1	2	3	4	5	6	7	8	Final
(Scotland) Ross Whyte	0	1	0	2	1	0	3	X	7
(Sweden) Niklas Edin 🔨	1	0	1	0	0	1	0	X	3

===== Draw 12 =====
Thursday, December 18, 8:00 pm

Sheet B	1	2	3	4	5	6	7	8	Final
(Alberta) Brad Jacobs	0	1	0	0	2	0	3	0	6
(Newfoundland and Labrador) Brad Gushue 🔨	1	0	0	1	0	1	0	1	4

Sheet C	1	2	3	4	5	6	7	8	Final
(Switzerland) Yannick Schwaller 🔨	1	0	2	0	1	2	0	1	7
(Switzerland) Marco Hösli	0	2	0	1	0	0	2	0	5

===== Draw 13 =====
Friday, December 19, 8:30 am

Sheet A	1	2	3	4	5	6	7	8	Final
(Italy) Joël Retornaz 🔨	0	1	0	0	1	0	X	X	2
(United States) John Shuster	0	0	1	3	0	3	X	X	7

Sheet B	1	2	3	4	5	6	7	8	9	Final
(United States) Daniel Casper 🔨	3	0	1	0	0	3	0	0	1	8
(Saskatchewan) Rylan Kleiter	0	2	0	1	2	0	0	2	0	7

===== Draw 14 =====
Friday, December 19, 12:00 pm

Sheet A	1	2	3	4	5	6	7	8	9	Final
(Manitoba) Matt Dunstone	0	2	0	0	0	1	0	1	0	4
(Newfoundland and Labrador) Brad Gushue 🔨	1	0	1	2	0	0	0	0	1	5

Sheet B	1	2	3	4	5	6	7	8	Final
(Scotland) Ross Whyte 🔨	2	0	0	0	1	0	2	0	5
(Switzerland) Marco Hösli	0	0	1	0	0	1	0	1	3

===== Draw 15 =====
Friday, December 19, 4:00 pm

Sheet A	1	2	3	4	5	6	7	8	Final
(Alberta) Brad Jacobs 🔨	1	0	2	2	0	4	X	X	9
(Germany) Marc Muskatewitz	0	1	0	0	1	0	X	X	2

Sheet B	1	2	3	4	5	6	7	8	Final
(Switzerland) Yannick Schwaller 🔨	0	2	2	1	3	X	X	X	8
(Sweden) Niklas Edin	1	0	0	0	0	X	X	X	1

===== Draw 16 =====
Friday, December 19, 8:00 pm

Sheet A	1	2	3	4	5	6	7	8	9	Final
(Ontario) John Epping 🔨	1	0	2	0	2	0	0	1	1	7
(Saskatchewan) Mike McEwen	0	2	0	1	0	2	1	0	0	6

Sheet B	1	2	3	4	5	6	7	8	Final
(Scotland) Bruce Mouat	0	0	3	0	2	2	0	X	7
(Scotland) Kyle Waddell 🔨	0	1	0	1	0	0	2	X	4

==== Tiebreaker ====
Saturday, December 20, 8:30 am

Sheet C	1	2	3	4	5	6	7	8	Final
(Italy) Joël Retornaz 🔨	3	0	2	1	0	2	0	1	9
(Scotland) Kyle Waddell	0	3	0	0	3	0	2	0	8

==== Playoffs ====
Quarterfinals
1	(Scotland) Bruce Mouat	5
8	(Italy) Joël Retornaz	3
4	(Alberta) Brad Jacobs	6
5	(Scotland) Ross Whyte	8
2	(Switzerland) Yannick Schwaller	7
7	(Germany) Marc Muskatewitz	1
3	(United States) John Shuster	9
6	(Newfoundland and Labrador) Brad Gushue	4

Semifinals
1	(Scotland) Bruce Mouat	4
5	(Scotland) Ross Whyte	6
2	(Switzerland) Yannick Schwaller	7
3	(United States) John Shuster	5

Final
5	(Scotland) Ross Whyte	4
2	(Switzerland) Yannick Schwaller	7

===== Quarterfinals =====
Saturday, December 20, 4:00 pm

Sheet A	1	2	3	4	5	6	7	8	Final
(Alberta) Brad Jacobs	0	1	1	0	1	0	3	0	6
(Scotland) Ross Whyte 🔨	2	0	0	2	0	3	0	1	8

Sheet B	1	2	3	4	5	6	7	8	Final
(Switzerland) Yannick Schwaller 🔨	1	2	2	0	0	2	X	X	7
(Germany) Marc Muskatewitz	0	0	0	0	1	0	X	X	1

Sheet C	1	2	3	4	5	6	7	8	Final
(United States) John Shuster 🔨	0	2	0	3	2	0	2	X	9
(Newfoundland and Labrador) Brad Gushue	1	0	1	0	0	2	0	X	4

Sheet D	1	2	3	4	5	6	7	8	Final
(Scotland) Bruce Mouat 🔨	2	0	1	0	0	1	1	0	5
(Italy) Joël Retornaz	0	1	0	1	0	0	0	1	3

===== Semifinals =====
Saturday, December 20, 8:00 pm

Sheet B	1	2	3	4	5	6	7	8	Final
(Scotland) Bruce Mouat 🔨	0	2	0	1	1	0	0	0	4
(Scotland) Ross Whyte	1	0	1	0	0	0	2	2	6

Sheet D	1	2	3	4	5	6	7	8	Final
(Switzerland) Yannick Schwaller 🔨	3	0	1	0	0	2	0	1	7
(United States) John Shuster	0	1	0	2	1	0	1	0	5

===== Final =====
Sunday, December 21, 3:30 pm

Sheet B	1	2	3	4	5	6	7	8	Final
(Scotland) Ross Whyte	0	1	0	1	0	1	1	0	4
(Switzerland) Yannick Schwaller 🔨	1	0	1	0	4	0	0	1	7

==== Player percentages ====
Final Round Robin Percentages

Leads	%
(Manitoba) Ryan Harnden	91.23
(Scotland) Euan Kyle	90.97
(Scotland) Blair Haswell	90.00
(United States) Aidan Oldenburg	88.64
(Newfoundland and Labrador) Geoff Walker	88.44
(Saskatchewan) Dan Marsh	87.50
(Alberta) Ben Hebert	87.33
(Saskatchewan) Trevor Johnson	87.24
(Switzerland) Justin Hausherr	86.33
(Sweden) Christoffer Sundgren	85.77
(Germany) Johannes Scheuerl	85.71
(Italy) Mattia Giovanella	84.67
(Switzerland) Pablo Lachat-Couchepin	84.64
(Ontario) Ian McMillan	84.52
(United States) Matt Hamilton	83.16
(Scotland) Hammy McMillan Jr.	81.67

Seconds	%
(Newfoundland and Labrador) Brendan Bottcher	88.75
(Scotland) Bobby Lammie	88.67
(Switzerland) Sven Michel	83.57
(Manitoba) E. J. Harnden	83.10
(Alberta) Brett Gallant	83.00
(Scotland) Craig Waddell	82.95
(Scotland) Angus Bryce	81.79
(Saskatchewan) Joshua Mattern	80.69
(Italy) Sebastiano Arman	80.67
(Saskatchewan) Kevin Marsh	80.63
(United States) Ben Richardson	80.45
(Ontario) Tanner Horgan	78.39
(Sweden) Rasmus Wranå	78.08
(Germany) Felix Messenzehl	76.43
(United States) Colin Hufman	75.71
(Switzerland) Simon Gloor	71.33

Thirds	%
(Scotland) Grant Hardie	86.00
(Italy) Amos Mosaner	85.33
(Newfoundland and Labrador) Mark Nichols	82.19
(Scotland) Mark Watt	82.14
(Sweden) Oskar Eriksson	81.15
(Saskatchewan) Matthew Hall	81.03
(United States) Chris Plys	80.71
(Switzerland) Yannick Schwaller (Skip)	80.71
(Alberta) Marc Kennedy	79.67
(Scotland) Robin Brydone	79.35
(Ontario) Jacob Horgan	79.03
(Manitoba) Colton Lott	78.62
(Saskatchewan) Colton Flasch	77.19
(United States) Luc Violette	74.09
(Switzerland) Marco Hösli (Skip)	73.33
(Germany) Benjamin Kapp	71.43

Skips	%
(Italy) Joël Retornaz	87.33
(Scotland) Ross Whyte	85.16
(United States) John Shuster	84.07
(Alberta) Brad Jacobs	83.67
(Newfoundland and Labrador) Brad Gushue	82.86
(Scotland) Bruce Mouat	82.41
(Scotland) Kyle Waddell	80.71
(Switzerland) Benoît Schwarz-van Berkel (Fourth)	80.00
(Saskatchewan) Rylan Kleiter	79.30
(Switzerland) Philipp Hösli (Fourth)	78.64
(Germany) Marc Muskatewitz	78.18
(Ontario) John Epping	76.45
(Saskatchewan) Mike McEwen	76.25
(Manitoba) Matt Dunstone	75.44
(Sweden) Niklas Edin	71.76
(United States) Daniel Casper	69.55

=== Tier 2 ===
==== Teams ====
The teams are listed as follows:

Skip	Third	Second	Lead	Alternate	Locale
Michael Brunner	Anthony Petoud	Romano Meier	Andreas Gerlach		Bern, Switzerland
Reid Carruthers	B. J. Neufeld	Catlin Schneider	Connor Njegovan	Kyle Doering	Winnipeg, Manitoba
Alberto Zisa (Fourth)	Giacomo Colli (Skip)	Francesco De Zanna	Fabio Ribotta		Trentino, Italy
Dylan Derksen	Logan Sawicki	Tyler Derksen	Gavin Martens		Saskatoon, Saskatchewan
Dustin Kalthoff	Josh Heidt	Jason Jacobson (Note: Jason Jacobson spared for Brent Pierce.)	Logan Ede		Saskatoon, Saskatchewan
Mark Kean	Brady Lumley	Matthew Garner	Spencer Dunlop		Woodstock, Ontario
Lukáš Klíma	Marek Černovský	Martin Jurík	Lukáš Klípa	Radek Boháč	Prague, Czech Republic
Kelly Knapp	Brennen Jones	Dustin Kidby	Mat Ring		Regina, Saskatchewan
Tyler Tardi (Fourth) (Note: Kevin Koe and Tyler Tardi switched positions for the event.)	Kevin Koe (Skip)	Aaron Sluchinski	– (Note: Team Koe played with three players.)		Calgary, Alberta
Takumi Maeda	Hiroki Maeda	Uryu Kamikawa	– (Note: Team Maeda played with three players.)		Tokoro, Japan
Jacques Gauthier	Jason Ginter (Note: Jason Ginter spared for Jordon McDonald. He played third while Jacquies Gauthier moved up to skip.)	Elias Huminicki	Cameron Olafson		Winnipeg, Manitoba
Sam Mooibroek	Ryan Wiebe	Scott Mitchell	Nathan Steele		Whitby, Ontario
Magnus Ramsfjell	Martin Sesaker	Bendik Ramsfjell	Gaute Nepstad		Trondheim, Norway
Andrew Stopera (Note: Andrew Stopera skipped Team Korey Dropkin, and added Lance Wheeler as lead to the team, after Dropkin stepped back from the team to focus on representing the United States in mixed doubles at the 2026 Winter Olympics.)	Thomas Howell	Mark Fenner	Lance Wheeler		(United States) Duluth, Minnesota
Xu Xiaoming	Fei Xueqing	Li Zhichao	Xu Jingtao	Wang Zhenhao	Beijing, China
Riku Yanagisawa (Fourth)	Tsuyoshi Yamaguchi (Skip)	Takeru Yamamoto	Satoshi Koizumi		Karuizawa, Japan

==== Round robin standings ====
Final Round Robin Standings

Key
Teams to Playoffs
Teams to Tiebreakers

Pool A	W	SOW	SOL	L	PF	PA	Pts
(Ontario) Sam Mooibroek	3	0	0	1	28	18	9
(Japan) Takumi Maeda	2	0	0	2	22	22	6
(China) Xu Xiaoming	2	0	0	2	22	21	6
(Saskatchewan) Dylan Derksen	0	0	0	4	11	32	0

Pool B	W	SOW	SOL	L	PF	PA	Pts
(Czech Republic) Lukáš Klíma	3	0	0	1	26	22	9
(Norway) Magnus Ramsfjell	3	0	0	1	25	12	9
(Italy) Giacomo Colli	2	0	0	2	21	21	6
(Alberta) Kevin Koe	1	0	0	3	17	27	3

Pool C	W	SOW	SOL	L	PF	PA	Pts
(Switzerland) Michael Brunner	3	0	0	1	24	19	9
(United States) Andrew Stopera	2	0	0	2	27	21	6
(Manitoba) Reid Carruthers	2	0	0	2	22	23	6
(Saskatchewan) Dustin Kalthoff	0	0	0	4	16	33	0

Pool D	W	SOW	SOL	L	PF	PA	Pts
(Ontario) Mark Kean	3	0	0	1	27	16	9
(Manitoba) Team McDonald	2	0	0	2	22	18	6
(Japan) Tsuyoshi Yamaguchi	2	0	0	2	24	24	6
(Saskatchewan) Kelly Knapp	2	0	0	2	19	24	6

==== Round robin results ====
All draw times are listed in Central Time (UTC−06:00).

===== Draw 1 =====
Tuesday, December 16, 8:00 am

Sheet C	1	2	3	4	5	6	7	8	Final
(United States) Andrew Stopera 🔨	1	0	0	0	5	0	2	0	8
(Saskatchewan) Dustin Kalthoff	0	1	1	1	0	2	0	2	7

Sheet D	1	2	3	4	5	6	7	8	Final
(Ontario) Sam Mooibroek 🔨	1	0	0	1	1	2	4	X	9
(Saskatchewan) Dylan Derksen	0	0	1	0	0	0	0	X	1

===== Draw 2 =====
Tuesday, December 16, 12:00 pm

Sheet C	1	2	3	4	5	6	7	8	Final
(Czech Republic) Lukáš Klíma 🔨	2	0	1	0	2	0	0	X	5
(Italy) Giacomo Colli	0	2	0	2	0	3	1	X	8

Sheet D	1	2	3	4	5	6	7	8	Final
(Japan) Tsuyoshi Yamaguchi	0	1	0	0	3	0	X	X	4
(Ontario) Mark Kean 🔨	3	0	1	2	0	3	X	X	9

===== Draw 3 =====
Tuesday, December 16, 4:30 pm

Sheet C	1	2	3	4	5	6	7	8	Final
(Norway) Magnus Ramsfjell 🔨	2	1	3	2	X	X	X	X	8
(Alberta) Kevin Koe	0	0	0	0	X	X	X	X	0

Sheet D	1	2	3	4	5	6	7	8	Final
(China) Xu Xiaoming	0	1	0	1	0	2	0	1	5
(Japan) Takumi Maeda 🔨	2	0	0	0	1	0	0	0	3

===== Draw 4 =====
Tuesday, December 16, 8:30 pm

Sheet C	1	2	3	4	5	6	7	8	Final
(Manitoba) Reid Carruthers	0	1	0	2	1	0	0	0	4
(Switzerland) Michael Brunner 🔨	2	0	2	0	0	1	1	1	7

Sheet D	1	2	3	4	5	6	7	8	Final
(Manitoba) Team McDonald 🔨	0	0	1	0	1	0	0	1	3
(Saskatchewan) Kelly Knapp	0	0	0	2	0	1	2	0	5

===== Draw 5 =====
Wednesday, December 17, 8:00 am

Sheet B	1	2	3	4	5	6	7	8	Final
(Norway) Magnus Ramsfjell	0	1	0	0	2	1	1	2	7
(Italy) Giacomo Colli 🔨	1	0	2	2	0	0	0	0	5

Sheet C	1	2	3	4	5	6	7	8	Final
(China) Xu Xiaoming 🔨	0	1	0	1	0	1	0	X	3
(Ontario) Sam Mooibroek	1	0	3	0	2	0	2	X	8

===== Draw 6 =====
Wednesday, December 17, 12:00 pm

Sheet B	1	2	3	4	5	6	7	8	Final
(United States) Andrew Stopera	3	0	1	1	0	0	0	0	5
(Switzerland) Michael Brunner 🔨	0	3	0	0	1	0	1	1	6

Sheet C	1	2	3	4	5	6	7	8	Final
(Japan) Takumi Maeda 🔨	0	2	0	4	0	2	0	X	8
(Saskatchewan) Dylan Derksen	1	0	1	0	1	0	1	X	4

===== Draw 7 =====
Wednesday, December 17, 4:30 pm

Sheet B	1	2	3	4	5	6	7	8	Final
(Czech Republic) Lukáš Klíma 🔨	2	1	0	1	0	2	0	3	9
(Alberta) Kevin Koe	0	0	2	0	2	0	3	0	7

Sheet C	1	2	3	4	5	6	7	8	Final
(Japan) Tsuyoshi Yamaguchi 🔨	1	1	0	1	3	0	2	X	8
(Saskatchewan) Kelly Knapp	0	0	1	0	0	3	0	X	4

===== Draw 8 =====
Wednesday, December 17, 8:30 pm

Sheet B	1	2	3	4	5	6	7	8	Final
(Manitoba) Reid Carruthers	0	3	1	0	5	2	X	X	11
(Saskatchewan) Dustin Kalthoff 🔨	3	0	0	1	0	0	X	X	4

Sheet C	1	2	3	4	5	6	7	8	Final
(Manitoba) Team McDonald 🔨	3	1	0	2	2	X	X	X	8
(Ontario) Mark Kean	0	0	2	0	0	X	X	X	2

===== Draw 9 =====
Thursday, December 18, 8:00 am

Sheet A	1	2	3	4	5	6	7	8	Final
(Czech Republic) Lukáš Klíma 🔨	0	2	0	2	0	2	0	X	6
(Switzerland) Michael Brunner	0	0	2	0	1	0	1	X	4

Sheet B	1	2	3	4	5	6	7	8	Final
(China) Xu Xiaoming	1	0	2	0	2	0	1	X	6
(Saskatchewan) Kelly Knapp 🔨	0	3	0	3	0	2	0	X	8

===== Draw 10 =====
Thursday, December 18, 12:00 pm

Sheet A	1	2	3	4	5	6	7	8	Final
(Norway) Magnus Ramsfjell 🔨	3	1	0	3	X	X	X	X	7
(Saskatchewan) Dustin Kalthoff	0	0	1	0	X	X	X	X	1

Sheet B	1	2	3	4	5	6	7	8	Final
(Japan) Tsuyoshi Yamaguchi 🔨	0	1	3	1	0	0	2	X	7
(Saskatchewan) Dylan Derksen	1	0	0	0	0	3	0	X	4

===== Draw 11 =====
Thursday, December 18, 4:30 pm

Sheet A	1	2	3	4	5	6	7	8	Final
(Manitoba) Reid Carruthers 🔨	1	1	0	1	0	1	0	1	5
(Italy) Giacomo Colli	0	0	1	0	1	0	1	0	3

Sheet B	1	2	3	4	5	6	7	8	Final
(Manitoba) Team McDonald	0	1	0	2	1	0	0	0	4
(Japan) Takumi Maeda 🔨	1	0	2	0	0	1	1	1	6

===== Draw 12 =====
Thursday, December 18, 8:30 pm

Sheet A	1	2	3	4	5	6	7	8	Final
(United States) Andrew Stopera	0	1	0	0	2	0	2	0	5
(Alberta) Kevin Koe 🔨	2	0	1	0	0	1	0	2	6

Sheet B	1	2	3	4	5	6	7	8	Final
(Ontario) Sam Mooibroek	0	2	0	0	X	X	X	X	2
(Ontario) Mark Kean 🔨	3	0	4	2	X	X	X	X	9

===== Draw 13 =====
Friday, December 19, 8:00 am

Sheet A	1	2	3	4	5	6	7	8	Final
(Japan) Tsuyoshi Yamaguchi	0	3	0	0	0	1	1	0	5
(Manitoba) Team McDonald 🔨	1	0	0	3	1	0	0	2	7

Sheet D	1	2	3	4	5	6	7	8	Final
(Norway) Magnus Ramsfjell	0	1	0	1	0	0	1	X	3
(Czech Republic) Lukáš Klíma 🔨	1	0	2	0	0	3	0	X	6

===== Draw 14 =====
Friday, December 19, 12:00 pm

Sheet A	1	2	3	4	5	6	7	8	Final
(China) Xu Xiaoming	0	0	1	1	0	6	X	X	8
(Saskatchewan) Dylan Derksen 🔨	0	1	0	0	1	0	X	X	2

Sheet D	1	2	3	4	5	6	7	8	Final
(Switzerland) Michael Brunner	0	2	0	2	0	3	0	X	7
(Saskatchewan) Dustin Kalthoff 🔨	1	0	1	0	1	0	1	X	4

===== Draw 15 =====
Friday, December 19, 4:30 pm

Sheet A	1	2	3	4	5	6	7	8	Final
(Ontario) Mark Kean 🔨	2	0	2	0	1	2	X	X	7
(Saskatchewan) Kelly Knapp	0	1	0	1	0	0	X	X	2

Sheet D	1	2	3	4	5	6	7	8	Final
(Manitoba) Reid Carruthers	1	0	1	0	X	X	X	X	2
(United States) Andrew Stopera 🔨	0	4	0	5	X	X	X	X	9

===== Draw 16 =====
Friday, December 19, 8:30 pm

Sheet A	1	2	3	4	5	6	7	8	Final
(Ontario) Sam Mooibroek	2	0	5	0	2	0	X	X	9
(Japan) Takumi Maeda 🔨	0	2	0	2	0	1	X	X	5

Sheet D	1	2	3	4	5	6	7	8	Final
(Alberta) Kevin Koe	1	0	1	0	0	2	0	0	4
(Italy) Giacomo Colli 🔨	0	2	0	1	0	0	1	1	5

==== Tiebreakers ====
Saturday, December 20, 8:00 am

Sheet B	1	2	3	4	5	6	7	8	9	Final
(Manitoba) Team McDonald	0	0	2	0	1	0	1	1	0	5
(Saskatchewan) Kelly Knapp 🔨	0	2	0	1	0	2	0	0	1	6

Sheet C	1	2	3	4	5	6	7	8	Final
(Italy) Giacomo Colli	0	2	0	0	1	0	2	1	6
(Japan) Tsuyoshi Yamaguchi 🔨	1	0	2	3	0	1	0	0	7

Sheet D	1	2	3	4	5	6	7	8	Final
(Japan) Takumi Maeda 🔨	1	0	0	0	2	0	2	0	5
(China) Xu Xiaoming	0	2	2	0	0	1	0	1	6

==== Playoffs ====
Quarterfinals
1	(Czech Republic) Lukáš Klíma	6
8	(China) Xu Xiaoming	7
4	(Ontario) Sam Mooibroek	5
5	(Switzerland) Michael Brunner	6
2	(Norway) Magnus Ramsfjell	6
7	(Saskatchewan) Kelly Knapp	3
3	(Ontario) Mark Kean	5
6	(Japan) Tsuyoshi Yamaguchi	8

Semifinals
8	(China) Xu Xiaoming	6
5	(Switzerland) Michael Brunner	7
2	(Norway) Magnus Ramsfjell	8
6	(Japan) Tsuyoshi Yamaguchi	1

Final
5	(Switzerland) Michael Brunner	6
2	(Norway) Magnus Ramsfjell	9

===== Quarterfinals =====
Saturday, December 20, 4:30 pm

Sheet A	1	2	3	4	5	6	7	8	Final
(Czech Republic) Lukáš Klíma 🔨	3	0	0	0	1	0	0	2	6
(China) Xu Xiaoming	0	0	2	2	0	2	1	0	7

Sheet B	1	2	3	4	5	6	7	8	Final
(Ontario) Mark Kean 🔨	1	0	3	0	0	1	0	0	5
(Japan) Tsuyoshi Yamaguchi	0	3	0	1	1	0	2	1	8

Sheet C	1	2	3	4	5	6	7	8	Final
(Ontario) Sam Mooibroek 🔨	2	0	0	1	0	0	1	1	5
(Switzerland) Michael Brunner	0	1	2	0	0	3	0	0	6

Sheet D	1	2	3	4	5	6	7	8	Final
(Norway) Magnus Ramsfjell 🔨	2	0	0	1	0	1	0	2	6
(Saskatchewan) Kelly Knapp	0	0	1	0	1	0	1	0	3

===== Semifinals =====
Saturday, December 20, 8:30 pm

Sheet A	1	2	3	4	5	6	7	8	Final
(Norway) Magnus Ramsfjell 🔨	0	4	3	0	1	X	X	X	8
(Japan) Tsuyoshi Yamaguchi	0	0	0	1	0	X	X	X	1

Sheet B	1	2	3	4	5	6	7	8	9	Final
(China) Xu Xiaoming	0	2	0	1	0	1	0	2	0	6
(Switzerland) Michael Brunner 🔨	1	0	3	0	0	0	2	0	1	7

===== Final =====
Sunday, December 21, 3:30 pm

Sheet D	1	2	3	4	5	6	7	8	Final
(Switzerland) Michael Brunner	0	0	2	0	4	0	0	0	6
(Norway) Magnus Ramsfjell 🔨	2	1	0	2	0	3	0	1	9

== Women ==
=== Tier 1 ===
==== Teams ====
The teams are listed as follows:

Skip	Third	Second	Lead	Alternate	Locale
Stefania Constantini	Elena Mathis	Angela Romei	Giulia Zardini Lacedelli		Cortina d'Ampezzo, Italy
Kerri Einarson	Val Sweeting	Shannon Birchard	Karlee Burgess		Gimli, Manitoba
Satsuki Fujisawa	Chinami Yoshida	Yumi Suzuki	Yurika Yoshida		Kitami, Japan
Gim Eun-ji	Kim Min-ji	Kim Su-ji	Seol Ye-eun	Seol Ye-ji	Uijeongbu, South Korea
Ha Seung-youn	Kim Hye-rin	Yang Tae-i	Kim Su-jin	Park Seo-jin	Chuncheon, South Korea
Anna Hasselborg	Sara McManus	Agnes Knochenhauer	Sofia Scharback		Sundbyberg, Sweden
Rachel Homan	Tracy Fleury	Emma Miskew	Sarah Wilkes		Ottawa, Ontario
Kang Bo-bae	Shim Yu-jeong	Kim Min-seo	Kim Ji-soo	Lee Bo-young	Jeonbuk, South Korea
Kim Eun-jung	Kim Kyeong-ae	Kim Cho-hi	Kim Yeong-mi (Note: Alternate Kim Yeong-mi played lead, replacing Kim Seon-yeong who was competing in the Olympic Qualification Event.)		Gangneung, South Korea
Ikue Kitazawa	Seina Nakajima	Minori Suzuki	Hasumi Ishigooka		Nagano, Japan
Rebecca Morrison (Fourth)	Jennifer Dodds	Sophie Sinclair	Sophie Jackson (Skip) (Note: Sophie Jackson skipped Team Morrison.)		Stirling, Scotland
Xenia Schwaller	Selina Gafner	Fabienne Rieder	Selina Rychiger		Zurich, Switzerland
Miku Nihira (Note: Miku Nihira skipped Team Tabata.)	Momoha Tabata	Sae Yamamoto	Mikoto Nakajima		Sapporo, Japan
Alina Pätz (Fourth)	Silvana Tirinzoni (Skip)	Carole Howald	Selina Witschonke		Aarau, Switzerland
Wang Rui	Han Yu	Dong Ziqi	Jiang Jiayi	Su Tingyu	Beijing, China
Sayaka Yoshimura	Kaho Onodera	Yuna Kotani	Anna Ohmiya	Mina Kobayashi	Sapporo, Japan

==== Round robin standings ====
Final Round Robin Standings

Key
Teams to Playoffs
Teams to Tiebreakers

Pool A	W	SOW	SOL	L	PF	PA	Pts	LSD
(Manitoba) Kerri Einarson	4	0	0	0	32	9	12	234.8
(Ontario) Rachel Homan	3	0	0	1	20	15	9	39.9
(Italy) Stefania Constantini	1	0	0	3	19	29	3	25.8
(South Korea) Kim Eun-jung	0	0	0	4	18	33	0	192.6

Pool B	W	SOW	SOL	L	PF	PA	Pts	LSD
(Switzerland) Silvana Tirinzoni	3	0	0	1	23	16	9	27.3
(Japan) Sayaka Yoshimura	2	0	0	2	25	15	6	50.8
(Japan) Team Tabata	2	0	0	2	15	25	6	100.4
(Scotland) Team Morrison	1	0	0	3	14	24	3	378.7

Pool C	W	SOW	SOL	L	PF	PA	Pts	LSD
(Japan) Satsuki Fujisawa	3	0	0	1	25	17	9	62.2
(South Korea) Kang Bo-bae	2	0	0	2	22	21	6	103.4
(Sweden) Anna Hasselborg	2	0	0	2	19	20	6	239.1
(South Korea) Gim Eun-ji	1	0	0	3	16	21	3	165.3

Pool D	W	SOW	SOL	L	PF	PA	Pts	LSD
(South Korea) Ha Seung-youn	4	0	0	0	26	16	12	15.6
(China) Wang Rui	2	0	0	2	19	20	6	41.3
(Japan) Ikue Kitazawa	1	0	0	3	18	21	3	95.4
(Switzerland) Xenia Schwaller	1	0	0	3	18	27	3	142

==== Round robin results ====
All draw times are listed in Central Time (UTC−06:00).

===== Draw 1 =====
Tuesday, December 16, 8:00 am

Sheet A	1	2	3	4	5	6	7	8	Final
(South Korea) Ha Seung-youn 🔨	0	1	0	1	0	1	0	2	5
(China) Wang Rui	0	0	1	0	1	0	1	0	3

Sheet B	1	2	3	4	5	6	7	8	Final
(South Korea) Gim Eun-ji	0	1	0	1	1	0	0	0	3
(Japan) Satsuki Fujisawa 🔨	2	0	1	0	0	1	1	1	6

===== Draw 2 =====
Tuesday, December 16, 11:30 am

Sheet A	1	2	3	4	5	6	7	8	Final
(Switzerland) Xenia Schwaller 🔨	0	0	0	2	0	0	1	0	3
(Japan) Ikue Kitazawa	0	1	1	0	2	1	0	1	6

Sheet B	1	2	3	4	5	6	7	8	Final
(Switzerland) Silvana Tirinzoni	0	1	0	2	0	1	0	1	5
(Japan) Sayaka Yoshimura 🔨	1	0	1	0	1	0	1	0	4

===== Draw 3 =====
Tuesday, December 16, 3:00 pm

Sheet A	1	2	3	4	5	6	7	8	Final
(Manitoba) Kerri Einarson	2	4	0	1	0	4	X	X	11
(South Korea) Kim Eun-jung 🔨	0	0	1	0	2	0	X	X	3

Sheet B	1	2	3	4	5	6	7	8	Final
(Sweden) Anna Hasselborg	2	0	0	0	0	1	X	X	3
(South Korea) Kang Bo-bae 🔨	0	2	2	1	2	0	X	X	7

===== Draw 4 =====
Tuesday, December 16, 6:30 pm

Sheet A	1	2	3	4	5	6	7	8	Final
(Ontario) Rachel Homan	0	1	3	2	1	1	X	X	8
(Italy) Stefania Constantini 🔨	1	0	0	0	0	0	X	X	1

Sheet B	1	2	3	4	5	6	7	8	Final
(Japan) Team Tabata 🔨	2	0	2	0	1	2	X	X	7
(Scotland) Team Morrison	0	1	0	1	0	0	X	X	2

===== Draw 5 =====
Wednesday, December 17, 8:30 am

Sheet B	1	2	3	4	5	6	7	8	Final
(South Korea) Ha Seung-youn 🔨	2	0	2	0	0	3	0	1	8
(South Korea) Kim Eun-jung	0	1	0	2	2	0	0	0	5

Sheet C	1	2	3	4	5	6	7	8	Final
(Sweden) Anna Hasselborg	0	0	1	0	1	0	0	X	2
(Japan) Sayaka Yoshimura 🔨	2	0	0	2	0	2	3	X	9

===== Draw 6 =====
Wednesday, December 17, 12:00 pm

Sheet B	1	2	3	4	5	6	7	8	Final
(Switzerland) Xenia Schwaller	0	4	0	2	0	1	0	1	8
(Italy) Stefania Constantini 🔨	2	0	1	0	2	0	2	0	7

Sheet C	1	2	3	4	5	6	7	8	Final
(South Korea) Gim Eun-ji 🔨	1	1	0	1	0	0	0	0	3
(Scotland) Team Morrison	0	0	2	0	0	1	1	1	5

===== Draw 7 =====
Wednesday, December 17, 4:00 pm

Sheet B	1	2	3	4	5	6	7	8	Final
(Ontario) Rachel Homan	0	2	0	0	3	0	1	X	6
(Japan) Ikue Kitazawa 🔨	1	0	0	1	0	1	0	X	3

Sheet C	1	2	3	4	5	6	7	8	Final
(Switzerland) Silvana Tirinzoni 🔨	1	0	0	0	1	0	1	X	3
(South Korea) Kang Bo-bae	0	2	1	2	0	1	0	X	6

===== Draw 8 =====
Wednesday, December 17, 8:00 pm

Sheet B	1	2	3	4	5	6	7	8	Final
(Manitoba) Kerri Einarson	0	0	0	1	1	4	1	X	7
(China) Wang Rui 🔨	0	2	1	0	0	0	0	X	3

Sheet C	1	2	3	4	5	6	7	8	Final
(Japan) Team Tabata 🔨	0	1	0	0	0	X	X	X	1
(Japan) Satsuki Fujisawa	2	0	3	2	3	X	X	X	10

===== Draw 9 =====
Thursday, December 18, 8:30 am

Sheet A	1	2	3	4	5	6	7	8	Final
(South Korea) Gim Eun-ji	0	1	1	2	1	0	1	1	7
(South Korea) Kang Bo-bae 🔨	2	0	0	0	0	2	0	0	4

Sheet D	1	2	3	4	5	6	7	8	Final
(South Korea) Ha Seung-youn 🔨	0	0	3	0	0	2	0	1	6
(Japan) Ikue Kitazawa	0	1	0	1	1	0	1	0	4

===== Draw 10 =====
Thursday, December 18, 12:00 pm

Sheet A	1	2	3	4	5	6	7	8	Final
(Sweden) Anna Hasselborg	3	1	1	0	3	X	X	X	8
(Japan) Satsuki Fujisawa 🔨	0	0	0	1	0	X	X	X	1

Sheet D	1	2	3	4	5	6	7	8	Final
(Switzerland) Xenia Schwaller	0	0	0	2	0	1	0	X	3
(China) Wang Rui 🔨	1	2	1	0	1	0	2	X	7

===== Draw 11 =====
Thursday, December 18, 4:00 pm

Sheet A	1	2	3	4	5	6	7	8	Final
(Switzerland) Silvana Tirinzoni 🔨	3	1	0	1	0	4	X	X	9
(Japan) Team Tabata	0	0	1	0	1	0	X	X	2

Sheet D	1	2	3	4	5	6	7	8	Final
(Ontario) Rachel Homan 🔨	0	3	0	2	1	0	0	X	6
(South Korea) Kim Eun-jung	0	0	1	0	0	1	1	X	3

===== Draw 12 =====
Thursday, December 18, 8:00 pm

Sheet A	1	2	3	4	5	6	7	8	Final
(Japan) Sayaka Yoshimura 🔨	4	1	0	1	0	2	X	X	8
(Scotland) Team Morrison	0	0	1	0	2	0	X	X	3

Sheet D	1	2	3	4	5	6	7	8	Final
(Manitoba) Kerri Einarson	1	1	0	2	1	0	1	X	6
(Italy) Stefania Constantini 🔨	0	0	1	0	0	2	0	X	3

===== Draw 13 =====
Friday, December 19, 8:30 am

Sheet C	1	2	3	4	5	6	7	8	Final
(China) Wang Rui 🔨	1	0	1	0	1	0	2	1	6
(Japan) Ikue Kitazawa	0	1	0	3	0	1	0	0	5

Sheet D	1	2	3	4	5	6	7	8	Final
(Japan) Satsuki Fujisawa 🔨	2	1	0	4	0	1	0	X	8
(South Korea) Kang Bo-bae	0	0	3	0	1	0	1	X	5

===== Draw 14 =====
Friday, December 19, 12:00 pm

Sheet C	1	2	3	4	5	6	7	8	Final
(South Korea) Kim Eun-jung 🔨	2	0	2	0	2	0	1	0	7
(Italy) Stefania Constantini	0	1	0	3	0	2	0	2	8

Sheet D	1	2	3	4	5	6	7	8	Final
(Switzerland) Silvana Tirinzoni	0	2	0	1	0	1	1	1	6
(Scotland) Team Morrison 🔨	2	0	1	0	1	0	0	0	4

===== Draw 15 =====
Friday, December 19, 4:00 pm

Sheet C	1	2	3	4	5	6	7	8	Final
(Ontario) Rachel Homan 🔨	0	0	0	0	0	X	X	X	0
(Manitoba) Kerri Einarson	1	1	1	2	3	X	X	X	8

Sheet D	1	2	3	4	5	6	7	8	Final
(South Korea) Gim Eun-ji	0	1	1	0	0	0	1	0	3
(Sweden) Anna Hasselborg 🔨	1	0	0	2	2	0	0	1	6

===== Draw 16 =====
Friday, December 19, 8:00 pm

Sheet C	1	2	3	4	5	6	7	8	Final
(Switzerland) Xenia Schwaller 🔨	1	0	0	2	0	1	0	X	4
(South Korea) Ha Seung-youn	0	1	0	0	4	0	2	X	7

Sheet D	1	2	3	4	5	6	7	8	Final
(Japan) Team Tabata 🔨	0	0	1	0	2	0	1	1	5
(Japan) Sayaka Yoshimura	0	2	0	1	0	1	0	0	4

==== Tiebreakers ====
Saturday, December 20, 8:30 am

Sheet A	1	2	3	4	5	6	7	8	Final
(Japan) Sayaka Yoshimura 🔨	1	0	3	1	1	1	X	X	7
(Sweden) Anna Hasselborg	0	1	0	0	0	0	X	X	1

Sheet B	1	2	3	4	5	6	7	8	Final
(Japan) Team Tabata	1	0	0	2	2	1	0	0	6
(South Korea) Kang Bo-bae 🔨	0	1	1	0	0	0	1	1	4

==== Playoffs ====
Quarterfinals
1	(South Korea) Ha Seung-youn	6
8	(Japan) Team Tabata	7
4	(Ontario) Rachel Homan	4
5	(Japan) Satsuki Fujisawa	5
2	(Manitoba) Kerri Einarson	6
7	(Japan) Sayaka Yoshimura	9
3	(Switzerland) Silvana Tirinzoni	7
6	(China) Wang Rui	4

Semifinals
8	(Japan) Team Tabata	4
5	(Japan) Satsuki Fujisawa	7
7	(Japan) Sayaka Yoshimura	4
3	(Switzerland) Silvana Tirinzoni	5

Final
5	(Japan) Satsuki Fujisawa	1
3	(Switzerland) Silvana Tirinzoni	7

===== Quarterfinals =====
Saturday, December 20, 12:00 pm

Sheet A	1	2	3	4	5	6	7	8	9	Final
(South Korea) Ha Seung-youn 🔨	0	1	0	0	1	3	0	1	0	6
(Japan) Team Tabata	0	0	2	1	0	0	3	0	1	7

Sheet B	1	2	3	4	5	6	7	8	Final
(Ontario) Rachel Homan 🔨	2	0	0	0	1	0	0	1	4
(Japan) Satsuki Fujisawa	0	1	1	1	0	1	1	0	5

Sheet C	1	2	3	4	5	6	7	8	Final
(Switzerland) Silvana Tirinzoni 🔨	3	0	0	2	0	1	0	1	7
(China) Wang Rui	0	1	1	0	1	0	1	0	4

Sheet D	1	2	3	4	5	6	7	8	Final
(Manitoba) Kerri Einarson 🔨	1	0	0	3	0	1	1	0	6
(Japan) Sayaka Yoshimura	0	2	3	0	2	0	0	2	9

===== Semifinals =====
Saturday, December 20, 8:00 pm

Sheet A	1	2	3	4	5	6	7	8	Final
(Japan) Sayaka Yoshimura	0	1	0	0	1	0	2	0	4
(Switzerland) Silvana Tirinzoni 🔨	1	0	0	2	0	1	0	1	5

Sheet C	1	2	3	4	5	6	7	8	Final
(Japan) Team Tabata 🔨	1	0	2	1	0	0	0	X	4
(Japan) Satsuki Fujisawa	0	1	0	0	3	2	1	X	7

===== Final =====
Sunday, December 21, 11:00 am

Sheet B	1	2	3	4	5	6	7	8	Final
(Japan) Satsuki Fujisawa	0	1	0	0	0	0	X	X	1
(Switzerland) Silvana Tirinzoni 🔨	2	0	0	1	1	3	X	X	7

Player percentages
(Japan) Team Fujisawa		(Switzerland) Team Tirinzoni	
Yurika Yoshida	73%	Selina Witschonke	93%
Yumi Suzuki	75%	Carole Howald	88%
Chinami Yoshida	71%	Silvana Tirinzoni	75%
Satsuki Fujisawa	61%	Alina Pätz	87%
Total	70%	Total	86%

==== Player percentages ====
Final Round Robin Percentages

Leads	%
(Switzerland) Selina Witschonke	88.62
(Ontario) Sarah Wilkes	86.54
(Japan) Anna Ohmiya	85.86
(Japan) Yurika Yoshida	85.20
(Scotland) Sophie Jackson (Skip)	83.57
(South Korea) Kim Yeong-mi	82.76
(South Korea) Kim Ji-soo	82.50
(South Korea) Seol Ye-eun	82.19
(Manitoba) Karlee Burgess	81.11
(Italy) Giulia Zardini Lacedelli	81.00
(China) Jiang Jiayi	80.97
(Switzerland) Selina Rychiger	80.32
(Sweden) Sofia Scharback	79.62
(South Korea) Kim Su-jin	79.38
(Japan) Mikoto Nakajima	78.80
(Japan) Hasumi Ishigooka	78.75

Seconds	%
(Japan) Yuna Kotani	82.07
(South Korea) Kim Su-ji	78.13
(South Korea) Kim Cho-hi	77.93
(Switzerland) Carole Howald	77.24
(Switzerland) Fabienne Rieder	76.13
(China) Dong Ziqi	76.13
(Japan) Minori Suzuki	75.94
(South Korea) Yang Tae-i	75.31
(Sweden) Agnes Knochenhauer	75.00
(South Korea) Kim Min-seo	74.64
(Ontario) Emma Miskew	74.62
(Japan) Yumi Suzuki	70.80
(Scotland) Sophie Sinclair	70.00
(Manitoba) Shannon Birchard	68.52
(Japan) Sae Yamamoto	68.00
(Italy) Angela Romei	61.33

Thirds	%
(South Korea) Kim Min-ji	80.63
(Japan) Kaho Onodera	79.32
(Manitoba) Val Sweeting	77.04
(South Korea) Shim Yu-jeong	76.79
(China) Han Yu	76.45
(Sweden) Sara McManus	73.33
(South Korea) Kim Hye-rin	73.13
(Japan) Seina Nakajima	73.13
(Ontario) Tracy Fleury	71.92
(Switzerland) Silvana Tirinzoni (Skip)	71.72
(Italy) Elena Mathis	71.00
(Scotland) Jennifer Dodds	70.36
(Japan) Chinami Yoshida	70.00
(Switzerland) Selina Gafner	69.03
(South Korea) Kim Kyeong-ae	64.48
(Japan) Momoha Tabata	63.60

Skips	%
(China) Wang Rui	79.02
(Japan) Satsuki Fujisawa	78.78
(South Korea) Ha Seung-youn	78.39
(Switzerland) Alina Pätz (Fourth)	77.89
(Japan) Ikue Kitazawa	77.70
(Japan) Sayaka Yoshimura	77.24
(Manitoba) Kerri Einarson	76.60
(South Korea) Kang Bo-bae	75.71
(South Korea) Gim Eun-ji	73.02
(Scotland) Rebecca Morrison (Fourth)	69.64
(Sweden) Anna Hasselborg	68.63
(Ontario) Rachel Homan	67.45
(Switzerland) Xenia Schwaller	65.00
(South Korea) Kim Eun-jung	62.07
(Italy) Stefania Constantini	61.03
(Japan) Miku Nihira	57.96

=== Tier 2 ===
==== Teams ====
The teams are listed as follows:

Skip	Third	Second	Lead	Alternate	Locale
Kamdyn Bauldic	Hannah Lundell	Lara McKee	Kaidyn Beek		Lloydminster, Saskatchewan
Christina Black	Jill Brothers	Marlee Powers (Note: Alternate Marlee Powers played second, replacing Jenn Baxter.)	Karlee Everist		Halifax, Nova Scotia
Corryn Brown	Erin Pincott	Sarah Koltun	Samantha Fisher		Kamloops, British Columbia
Kate Cameron	Briane Harris	Taylor McDonald	Mackenzie Elias		St. Adolphe, Manitoba
Hollie Duncan (Fourth)	Megan Balsdon (Skip) (Note: Megan Balsdon skipped Team Duncan.)	Rachelle Strybosch	Kelly Middaugh (Note: Kelly Middaugh spared for Tess Guyatt.)		Woodstock, Ontario
Madeleine Dupont	Mathilde Halse	Denise Dupont	My Larsen (Note: Alternate My Larsen replaced Jasmin Holtermann who was competing in the Olympic Qualification Event. She played lead while Denise Dupont played second.)		Hvidovre, Denmark
Serena Gray-Withers	Catherine Clifford	Lindsey Burgess	Zoe Cinnamon		Edmonton, Alberta
Kaitlyn Lawes (Fourth)	Selena Njegovan (Skip) (Note: Selena Njegovan skipped Team Lawes.)	Jocelyn Peterman	Kristin Gordon		Winnipeg, Manitoba
Kayla MacMillan	Brittany Tran	Lindsay Dubue	Lauren Lenentine		Victoria, British Columbia
Nancy Martin	Kadriana Lott	Christie Gamble	Colleen Ackerman (Note: Alternate Colleen Ackerman played lead, replacing Chaelynn Stewart who was on maternity leave.)		Wakaw, Saskatchewan
Park You-been	Kim Ji-yoon	Lee Eun-chae	Yang Seung-hee		Seoul, South Korea
Taylor Reese-Hansen	Megan McGillivray	Kim Bonneau	Julianna Mackenzie		Victoria, British Columbia
Kayla Skrlik	Margot Flemming	Ashton Skrlik	Geri-Lynn Ramsay	Crystal Rumberg	Calgary, Alberta
Ashley Thevenot	Stephanie Schmidt	Taylor Stremick	Kaylin Mattern		Saskatoon, Saskatchewan
Miyu Ueno	Yui Ueno	– (Note: Team Ueno played with three players.)	Asuka Kanai		Karuizawa, Japan
Isabella Wranå	Almida de Val	Maria Larsson	Linda Stenlund		Sundbyberg, Sweden

==== Round robin standings ====
Final Round Robin Standings

Key
Teams to Playoffs
Teams to Tiebreaker

Pool A	W	SOW	SOL	L	PF	PA	Pts
(Sweden) Isabella Wranå	3	0	0	1	27	19	9
(British Columbia) Taylor Reese-Hansen	2	0	1	1	25	20	7
(Saskatchewan) Kamdyn Bauldic	1	0	0	3	14	30	3
(Japan) Miyu Ueno	1	0	0	3	22	23	3

Pool B	W	SOW	SOL	L	PF	PA	Pts
(South Korea) Park You-been	3	0	0	1	24	23	9
(Denmark) Madeleine Dupont	2	0	0	2	25	17	6
(British Columbia) Kayla MacMillan	1	1	0	2	17	26	5
(Saskatchewan) Nancy Martin	0	0	1	3	14	30	1

Pool C	W	SOW	SOL	L	PF	PA	Pts
(Alberta) Serena Gray-Withers	2	1	0	1	28	19	8
(Manitoba) Team Lawes	2	0	1	1	21	19	7
(Alberta) Kayla Skrlik	2	0	0	2	23	22	6
(Saskatchewan) Ashley Thevenot	2	0	0	2	22	18	6

Pool D	W	SOW	SOL	L	PF	PA	Pts
(British Columbia) Corryn Brown	3	1	0	0	29	16	11
(Nova Scotia) Christina Black	2	0	1	1	22	20	7
(Manitoba) Kate Cameron	2	0	0	2	21	23	6
(Ontario) Team Duncan	0	1	0	3	15	24	2

==== Round robin results ====
All draw times are listed in Central Time (UTC−06:00).

===== Draw 1 =====
Tuesday, December 16, 8:00 am

Sheet A	1	2	3	4	5	6	7	8	9	Final
(British Columbia) Corryn Brown 🔨	2	0	1	0	0	2	0	2	1	8
(Nova Scotia) Christina Black	0	1	0	3	1	0	2	0	0	7

Sheet B	1	2	3	4	5	6	7	8	Final
(Alberta) Serena Gray-Withers 🔨	1	0	4	1	0	2	0	X	8
(Saskatchewan) Ashley Thevenot	0	3	0	0	1	0	1	X	5

===== Draw 2 =====
Tuesday, December 16, 12:00 pm

Sheet A	1	2	3	4	5	6	7	8	Final
(British Columbia) Taylor Reese-Hansen 🔨	0	1	0	1	0	2	0	0	4
(Japan) Miyu Ueno	1	0	1	0	3	0	2	1	8

Sheet B	1	2	3	4	5	6	7	8	Final
(Denmark) Madeleine Dupont	0	1	0	3	0	X	X	X	4
(South Korea) Park You-been 🔨	4	0	2	0	3	X	X	X	9

===== Draw 3 =====
Tuesday, December 16, 4:30 pm

Sheet A	1	2	3	4	5	6	7	8	Final
(Sweden) Isabella Wranå 🔨	3	2	0	3	0	0	2	X	10
(Saskatchewan) Kamdyn Bauldic	0	0	2	0	0	2	0	X	4

Sheet B	1	2	3	4	5	6	7	8	9	Final
(British Columbia) Kayla MacMillan	0	1	0	1	1	1	0	1	1	6
(Saskatchewan) Nancy Martin 🔨	2	0	2	0	0	0	1	0	0	5

===== Draw 4 =====
Tuesday, December 16, 8:30 pm

Sheet A	1	2	3	4	5	6	7	8	Final
(Manitoba) Kate Cameron 🔨	2	0	0	2	0	1	0	1	6
(Ontario) Team Duncan	0	1	1	0	2	0	1	0	5

Sheet B	1	2	3	4	5	6	7	8	Final
(Manitoba) Team Lawes	1	0	0	2	0	0	3	1	7
(Alberta) Kayla Skrlik 🔨	0	2	0	0	1	1	0	0	4

===== Draw 5 =====
Wednesday, December 17, 8:00 am

Sheet A	1	2	3	4	5	6	7	8	Final
(South Korea) Park You-been	0	3	1	0	0	1	0	2	7
(Saskatchewan) Nancy Martin 🔨	1	0	0	2	1	0	1	0	5

Sheet D	1	2	3	4	5	6	7	8	Final
(Sweden) Isabella Wranå 🔨	2	0	1	0	0	0	2	1	6
(Japan) Miyu Ueno	0	1	0	1	0	1	0	0	3

===== Draw 6 =====
Wednesday, December 17, 12:00 pm

Sheet A	1	2	3	4	5	6	7	8	Final
(Alberta) Serena Gray-Withers 🔨	0	0	0	2	0	2	0	X	4
(Alberta) Kayla Skrlik	1	2	1	0	2	0	2	X	8

Sheet D	1	2	3	4	5	6	7	8	Final
(British Columbia) Corryn Brown 🔨	2	0	1	0	3	1	X	X	7
(Ontario) Team Duncan	0	1	0	1	0	0	X	X	2

===== Draw 7 =====
Wednesday, December 17, 4:30 pm

Sheet A	1	2	3	4	5	6	7	8	Final
(Manitoba) Team Lawes	0	1	0	1	0	0	0	X	2
(Saskatchewan) Ashley Thevenot 🔨	2	0	1	0	1	1	3	X	8

Sheet D	1	2	3	4	5	6	7	8	Final
(British Columbia) Taylor Reese-Hansen 🔨	2	0	1	2	0	0	2	X	7
(Saskatchewan) Kamdyn Bauldic	0	1	0	0	1	0	0	X	2

===== Draw 8 =====
Wednesday, December 17, 8:30 pm

Sheet A	1	2	3	4	5	6	7	8	Final
(Denmark) Madeleine Dupont 🔨	4	1	2	1	X	X	X	X	8
(British Columbia) Kayla MacMillan	0	0	0	0	X	X	X	X	0

Sheet D	1	2	3	4	5	6	7	8	Final
(Manitoba) Kate Cameron	0	0	0	2	0	1	0	X	3
(Nova Scotia) Christina Black 🔨	1	1	1	0	1	0	2	X	6

===== Draw 9 =====
Thursday, December 18, 8:00 am

Sheet C	1	2	3	4	5	6	7	8	9	Final
(British Columbia) Taylor Reese-Hansen 🔨	1	1	0	1	0	0	1	1	0	5
(Ontario) Team Duncan	0	0	2	0	2	1	0	0	1	6

Sheet D	1	2	3	4	5	6	7	8	Final
(Alberta) Kayla Skrlik	0	1	0	1	1	0	0	2	5
(Saskatchewan) Ashley Thevenot 🔨	1	0	1	0	0	1	1	0	4

===== Draw 10 =====
Thursday, December 18, 12:00 pm

Sheet C	1	2	3	4	5	6	7	8	Final
(British Columbia) Corryn Brown 🔨	3	0	1	1	0	2	X	X	7
(Saskatchewan) Kamdyn Bauldic	0	1	0	0	0	0	X	X	1

Sheet D	1	2	3	4	5	6	7	8	Final
(Denmark) Madeleine Dupont 🔨	1	1	0	1	0	3	4	X	10
(Saskatchewan) Nancy Martin	0	0	2	0	1	0	0	X	3

===== Draw 11 =====
Thursday, December 18, 4:30 pm

Sheet C	1	2	3	4	5	6	7	8	Final
(Manitoba) Kate Cameron 🔨	0	1	0	2	0	1	0	2	6
(Japan) Miyu Ueno	0	0	2	0	1	0	2	0	5

Sheet D	1	2	3	4	5	6	7	8	Final
(British Columbia) Kayla MacMillan 🔨	1	0	0	0	3	0	0	0	4
(South Korea) Park You-been	0	2	1	1	0	1	1	1	7

===== Draw 12 =====
Thursday, December 18, 8:30 pm

Sheet C	1	2	3	4	5	6	7	8	Final
(Sweden) Isabella Wranå	1	0	2	1	0	2	1	X	7
(Nova Scotia) Christina Black 🔨	0	2	0	0	1	0	0	X	3

Sheet D	1	2	3	4	5	6	7	8	9	Final
(Manitoba) Team Lawes	1	0	0	0	0	2	2	0	0	5
(Alberta) Serena Gray-Withers 🔨	0	1	1	1	1	0	0	1	1	6

===== Draw 13 =====
Friday, December 19, 8:00 am

Sheet B	1	2	3	4	5	6	7	8	Final
(Japan) Miyu Ueno 🔨	0	3	1	1	0	1	0	0	6
(Saskatchewan) Kamdyn Bauldic	1	0	0	0	1	0	2	3	7

Sheet C	1	2	3	4	5	6	7	8	Final
(British Columbia) Kayla MacMillan	1	1	0	2	1	0	2	0	7
(Alberta) Kayla Skrlik 🔨	0	0	2	0	0	3	0	1	6

===== Draw 14 =====
Friday, December 19, 12:00 pm

Sheet B	1	2	3	4	5	6	7	8	Final
(Ontario) Team Duncan 🔨	1	0	0	0	1	0	0	X	2
(Nova Scotia) Christina Black	0	1	1	1	0	2	1	X	6

Sheet C	1	2	3	4	5	6	7	8	Final
(Alberta) Serena Gray-Withers 🔨	0	1	0	3	5	1	X	X	10
(South Korea) Park You-been	0	0	1	0	0	0	X	X	1

===== Draw 15 =====
Friday, December 19, 4:30 pm

Sheet B	1	2	3	4	5	6	7	8	Final
(Sweden) Isabella Wranå	0	1	0	0	1	2	0	0	4
(British Columbia) Taylor Reese-Hansen 🔨	1	0	2	1	0	0	3	2	9

Sheet C	1	2	3	4	5	6	7	8	Final
(Denmark) Madeleine Dupont	1	0	1	0	1	0	0	0	3
(Saskatchewan) Ashley Thevenot 🔨	0	1	0	1	0	1	1	1	5

===== Draw 16 =====
Friday, December 19, 8:30 pm

Sheet B	1	2	3	4	5	6	7	8	Final
(British Columbia) Corryn Brown	0	1	2	0	3	0	0	1	7
(Manitoba) Kate Cameron 🔨	2	0	0	1	0	2	1	0	6

Sheet C	1	2	3	4	5	6	7	8	Final
(Manitoba) Team Lawes	2	0	1	2	2	X	X	X	7
(Saskatchewan) Nancy Martin 🔨	0	1	0	0	0	X	X	X	1

==== Tiebreaker ====
Saturday, December 20, 8:00 am

Sheet A	1	2	3	4	5	6	7	8	Final
(Denmark) Madeleine Dupont 🔨	2	1	0	3	0	2	X	X	8
(Manitoba) Kate Cameron	0	0	2	0	1	0	X	X	3

==== Playoffs ====
Quarterfinals
1	(British Columbia) Corryn Brown	4
8	(Denmark) Madeleine Dupont	7
4	(Alberta) Serena Gray-Withers	6
5	(British Columbia) Taylor Reese-Hansen	7
2	(Sweden) Isabella Wranå	1
7	(Nova Scotia) Christina Black	7
3	(South Korea) Park You-been	3
6	(Manitoba) Team Lawes	9

Semifinals
8	(Denmark) Madeleine Dupont	4
5	(British Columbia) Taylor Reese-Hansen	5
7	(Nova Scotia) Christina Black	3
6	(Manitoba) Team Lawes	8

Final
5	(British Columbia) Taylor Reese-Hansen	6
6	(Manitoba) Team Lawes	5

===== Quarterfinals =====
Saturday, December 20, 12:30 pm

Sheet A	1	2	3	4	5	6	7	8	Final
(Alberta) Serena Gray-Withers 🔨	1	0	1	0	3	0	1	0	6
(British Columbia) Taylor Reese-Hansen	0	2	0	2	0	2	0	1	7

Sheet B	1	2	3	4	5	6	7	8	Final
(South Korea) Park You-been 🔨	0	1	0	1	0	1	0	X	3
(Manitoba) Team Lawes	1	0	3	0	3	0	2	X	9

Sheet C	1	2	3	4	5	6	7	8	Final
(Sweden) Isabella Wranå 🔨	0	0	1	0	0	0	X	X	1
(Nova Scotia) Christina Black	1	1	0	2	2	1	X	X	7

Sheet D	1	2	3	4	5	6	7	8	Final
(British Columbia) Corryn Brown 🔨	0	2	2	0	0	0	0	0	4
(Denmark) Madeleine Dupont	2	0	0	0	1	1	2	1	7

===== Semifinals =====
Saturday, December 20, 8:30 pm

Sheet C	1	2	3	4	5	6	7	8	Final
(Denmark) Madeleine Dupont	0	0	1	1	0	0	2	0	4
(British Columbia) Taylor Reese-Hansen 🔨	0	1	0	0	2	1	0	1	5

Sheet D	1	2	3	4	5	6	7	8	Final
(Nova Scotia) Christina Black	0	0	2	0	1	0	0	X	3
(Manitoba) Team Lawes 🔨	2	0	0	1	0	0	5	X	8

===== Final =====
Sunday, December 21, 11:00 am

Sheet D	1	2	3	4	5	6	7	8	9	Final
(British Columbia) Taylor Reese-Hansen 🔨	1	0	1	0	0	1	1	1	1	6
(Manitoba) Team Lawes	0	1	0	3	1	0	0	0	0	5
