= 2019 Italian Men's Curling Championship =

Curling tournament

- Host city: Pinerolo (playoffs)
- Dates: November 10, 2018 – April 14, 2019
- Winner: Team Retornaz (Joël Retornaz)
- Skip: Joël Retornaz
- Third: Simone Gonin
- Second: Fabio Ribotta
- Lead: Lorenzo Maurino
- Finalist: Trentino Cembra (Amos Mosaner)

The 43rd 2019 Italian Men's Curling Championship (Italian: Campionati Senior - Serie A maschile - Anno Sportivo 2018-2019) was held from November 10, 2018, to April 14, 2019, in two stages: the group stage (round robin) from November 10, 2018, to March 24, 2019 and the playoff stage from April 13 to 14, 2019.

Eight teams took part in the championship.

The winners of the championship were "Team Retornaz" (skip Joël Retornaz), who beat the "Trentino Cembra" team (skip Amos Mosaner) in the final. The bronze medal was won by the "Cembra 88 (Rizzolli)" team (skip Luca Rizzolli).

The championship was held in conjunction with the 2019 Italian Women's Curling Championship.

== Competition format ==
First was the group stage (Round robin), where the teams played among themselves in a four-round round robin system. If two teams had the same number of wins, they were ranked among themselves according to the result of two their matches; if the number of victories for three or more teams is equal, teams were ranked according to the results of the sum of Draw Shot Challenge (DSC, in centimetres; the smaller value, the higher the rank). The four best teams go to the second stage, the playoff, using the Page playoff system (two best teams, following the results of the group round, hold a match for a direct bye to the final (playoffs-1). The 3rd and 4th teams played, with the winners going to the semifinals (playoffs-2). The semifinal was between the loser in the first match and a winner in the second. In the finals, gold was to the winner of the 1 vs. 2 playoff game and the winner of the semifinal. Losers in the semifinals and the playoffs-2 game played for bronze medal.

== Teams ==
Team	Skip	Third	Second	Lead	Alternate	Coach
C.C. 66 Cortina	Giacomo Colli	Daniele Constantini	Alberto Zisa	Francesco De Zanna	Edoardo Alfonsi	
C.C. Tofane M	Guido Fassina	Elia De Pol	Antonio Menardi	Marcello Pachner	Malko Tondella	Alberto Menardi
Celtic Fireblock	Fabio Sola (4th)	Simone Sola	Valter Bruno (skip)	Julien Michele Genre		
Cembra 88 (Rizzolli)	Luca Rizzolli	Mattia Giovanella	Alessandro Odorizzi	Giovanni Gottardi		Tiziano Odorizzi
Cral Reale Mutua	Silvio Dellaia (4th)	Rino Messina (skip)	Guido Barco	Massimo Rovera	Danilo Capriolo	
Team Retornaz	Joël Retornaz	Simone Gonin	Fabio Ribotta	Lorenzo Maurino		
Trentino Cembra	Amos Mosaner	Sebastiano Arman	Daniele Ferrazza	Andrea Pilzer		
Velocisti Ghiaccio Torino	Marco Pascale	Lorenzo Piatti	Gioele De Luca	Elvis Molinero		

== Round robin ==
	Team	1	2	3	4	5	6	7	8	Wins	Losses	DSC, cm	Place
1	C.C. 66 Cortina (Giacomo Colli)	*	6:4; 9:1	4:6; 9:6	5:8; 6:8	9:5; 10:1	9:0; 3:8	1:10; 4:12	8:4; 7:3	8	6	179,0	3
2	C.C. Tofane M (Guido Fassina)	4:6; 1:9	*	6:7; 3:9	4:8; 7:12	14:3; 9:2	1:7; 0:8	2:5; 2:7	1:10; 7:10	2	12	292,2	8
3	Celtic Fireblock (Valter Bruno)	6:4; 6:9	7:6; 9:3	*	7:2; 9:6	6:11; 8:6	6:9; 1:12	5:7; 6:7	8:11; 5:11	6	8	155,1	6
4	Cembra 88 (Rizzolli) (Luca Rizzolli)	8:5; 8:6	8:4; 12:7	2:7; 6:9	*	12:5; 9:3	0:9; 3:14	2:10; 1:8	3:7; 9:5	7	7	151,4	4
5	Cral Reale Mutua (Rino Messina)	5:9; 1:10	3:14; 2:9	11:6; 6:8	5:12; 3:9	*	2:10; 2:10	2:10; 1:9	8:7; 4:10	2	12	185,1	7
6	Team Retornaz (Joël Retornaz)	0:9; 8:3	7:1; 8:0	9:6; 12:1	9:0; 14:3	10:2; 10:2	*	8:2; 10:8	11:3; 13:4	13	1	124,1	1
7	Trentino Cembra (Amos Mosaner)	10:1; 12:4	5:2; 7:2	7:5; 7:6	10:2; 8:1	10:2; 9:1	2:8; 8:10	*	7:2; 10:2	12	2	150,5	2
8	Velocisti Ghiaccio Torino (Marco Pascale)	4:8; 3:7	10:1; 10:7	11:8; 11:5	7:3; 5:9	7:8; 10:4	3:11; 4:13	2:7; 2:10	*	6	8	148,4	5

teams to playoffs

== Playoffs ==
Page playoff system
(1)	Team Retornaz	8
(2)	Trentino Cembra	7
(3)	C.C. 66 Cortina	8
(4)	Cembra 88 (Rizzolli)	7

Semifinal
Trentino Cembra	9
C.C. 66 Cortina	7

Final
Team Retornaz	6
Trentino Cembra	4

Bronze medal match
C.C. 66 Cortina	3
Cembra 88 (Rizzolli)	10

=== 1 vs. 2 ===
April 13, 10:00 am

Team	1	2	3	4	5	6	7	8	9	10	11	Final
Trentino Cembra	1	0	1	0	1	1	1	0	2	0	0	7
Team Retornaz 🔨	0	2	0	2	0	0	0	1	0	2	1	8

=== 3 vs. 4 ===
April 13, 2:30 pm

Team	1	2	3	4	5	6	7	8	9	10	Final
C.C. 66 Cortina 🔨	2	0	0	1	2	0	0	3	0	0	8
Cembra 88 (Rizzolli)	0	0	3	0	0	1	1	0	1	1	7

=== Semifinal ===
April 13, 7:30 pm

Team	1	2	3	4	5	6	7	8	9	10	Final
Trentino Cembra	2	0	0	3	0	2	0	2	0	X	9
C.C. 66 Cortina 🔨	0	2	1	0	1	0	2	0	1	X	7

=== Bronze medal match ===
April 14, 9:30 am

Team	1	2	3	4	5	6	7	8	9	10	Final
Cembra 88 (Rizzolli)	0	0	0	1	1	4	4	X	X	X	10
C.C. 66 Cortina 🔨	1	1	1	0	0	0	0	X	X	X	3

=== Final ===
April 14, 2:00 pm

Team	1	2	3	4	5	6	7	8	9	10	Final
Trentino Cembra	0	1	0	1	0	0	1	0	1	0	4
Team Retornaz 🔨	1	0	2	0	1	0	0	1	0	1	6

== Final standings ==
Place	Team	Skip	Games	Wins	Losses
1st place, gold medalist(s)	Team Retornaz	Joël Retornaz	16	15	1
2nd place, silver medalist(s)	Trentino Cembra	Amos Mosaner	17	13	4
3rd place, bronze medalist(s)	Cembra 88 (Rizzolli)	Luca Rizzolli	16	8	8
4	C.C. 66 Cortina	Giacomo Colli	17	9	8
5	Velocisti Ghiaccio Torino	Marco Pascale	14	6	8
6	Celtic Fireblock	Valter Bruno	14	6	8
7	Cral Reale Mutua	Rino Messina	14	2	12
8	C.C. Tofane M	Guido Fassina	14	2	12

== See also ==
- 2019 Italian Women's Curling Championship
- 2019 Italian Mixed Curling Championship
- 2019 Italian Mixed Doubles Curling Championship
- 2019 Italian Junior Curling Championships
