= Fabio Ribotta =

Italian male curler

- Curler
- Born: 3 December 1998 (age 27); Pinerolo, Italy

Team
- Curling club: SC Pinerolo; Pinerolo
- Skip: Giacomo Colli
- Fourth: Alberto Zisa
- Second: Francesco De Zanna
- Lead: Fabio Ribotta
- Mixed doubles partner: Lucrezia Grande

Curling career
- Member Association: Italy
- World Championship: 2 (2018, 2021)
- European Championship: 2 (2016, 2018)
Medal record
Men's curling
Representing Italy
European Championships
Bronze medal – third place	2018 Tallinn
Italian Men's Championship
Gold medal – first place	2019 Pinerolo
Silver medal – second place	2017
Bronze medal – third place	2018

Fabio Ribotta (born 3 December 1998 in Pinerolo, Italy) is an Italian curler, a 2018 European bronze medallist, 2019 Italian men's champion.

== Personal life ==
Ribotta works in the tire business.

== Teams ==
Season	Skip	Third	Second	Lead	Alternate	Coach	Events
2014–15	Amos Mosaner	Sebastiano Arman	Carlo Gottardi	Fabio Ribotta	Eugenio Molinatti	Gianandrea Gallinatto	WJCC 2015 (8th)
2014–15	Joël Retornaz	Simone Gonin	Fabio Ribotta	Lorenzo Maurino			
2016–17	Joël Retornaz	Amos Mosaner	Daniele Ferrazza	Andrea Pilzer	Fabio Ribotta	Jean-Pierre Rütsche	ECC 2016 (7th)
2016–17	Joël Retornaz	Simone Gonin	Fabio Ribotta	Lorenzo Maurino			
2016–17	Marco Onnis	Fabio Ribotta	Lorenzo Maurino	Marco Vespia	Davide Forchino	Lucilla Macchiati	WJCC 2017 (8th)
2016–17	Simone Gonin	Fabio Ribotta	Alessio Gonin	Lorenzo Maurino	Fabio Cavallo	Lucilla Macchiati	IMCC 2017 (silver)
2017–18	Joël Retornaz	Simone Gonin	Fabio Ribotta	Lorenzo Maurino		Lucilla Macchiati	IMCC 2018 (bronze)
2017–18	Amos Mosaner (fourth)	Joël Retornaz (skip)	Andrea Pilzer	Daniele Ferrazza	Fabio Ribotta	Sören Grahn	WCC 2018 (8th)
2018–19	Joël Retornaz	Amos Mosaner	Sebastiano Arman	Simone Gonin	Fabio Ribotta	Sören Grahn	ECC 2018 (bronze)
2018–19	Joël Retornaz	Simone Gonin	Fabio Ribotta	Lorenzo Maurino			IMCC 2019 (gold)
2019–20	Fabio Ribotta	Giovanni Tosel	Davide Forchino	Fabrizio Gallo			
2021–22	Fabio Ribotta	Fabrizio Gallo	Giovanni Tosel	Davide Forchino			
2022–23	Fabio Ribotta	Alberto Pimpini	Fabrizio Gallo	Francesco Vigliani	Stefano Gilli		
2025–26	Alberto Zisa (Fourth)	Giacomo Colli (Skip)	Francesco De Zanna	Fabio Ribotta			
