= 2019 Italian Mixed Doubles Curling Championship =

- Host city: Cembra (playoffs)
- Dates: October 13, 2018 – January 27, 2019
- Winner: Amos Mosaner / Alice Cobelli
- Finalist: Joël Retornaz / Angela Romei

The 2019 Italian Mixed Doubles Curling Championship (Italian: Campionati Mixed Doubles - Anno Sportivo 2018-2019) was held from October 13, 2018 to January 27, 2019 in two stages: the group stage (round robin) from October 13, 2018 to December 28, 2018 and the playoff stage from January 25 to 27, 2019.

24 teams took part in the championship, with the best 8 teams promoted to the playoff stage.

The winners of the championship were the Amos Mosaner / Alice Cobelli team, who beat the Joël Retornaz / Angela Romei team in the final. The bronze medal was won by the Lorenzo Maurino / Emanuela Cavallo team, who won the bronze match against the Fabrizio Gallo / Anna Maria Maurino team.

Team Amos Mosaner / Alice Cobelli represented Italy in the 2019 World Mixed Doubles Curling Championship and finished in 18th place.

== Teams ==
Team	Man	Woman	Locale
Arienti A. / Merlo G.	Alberto Arienti	Greta Merlo	A.s.d. Jass Curling Club
Bianchi A. / Erba M.	Andrea Maria Bianchi	Martina Erba	A.s.d. Jass Curling Club
Bozzi A. / Buitta V.	Antonio Francesco Bozzi	Valentina Buitta	A.s.d. Jass Curling Club
Cavallo F. / Bertolin A.	Fabio Cavallo	Alice Bertolin	A.s.d. Sporting Club Pinerolo
Colli G. / Girardi V.	Giacomo Colli	Valeria Girardi	Curling Club Dolomiti
Constantiti D. / Constantini S.	Daniele Constantini	Stefania Constantini	Curling Club Dolomiti
De Zanna F. / Lo Deserto M.	Francesco De Zanna	Marta Lo Deserto	Curling Club 66 Cortina A.s.d.
Dellaia S. / Aliberti S.	Silvio Dellaia	Sara Aliberti	A.s.d. Fireblock
Gallo F. / Maurino A.	Fabrizio Gallo	Anna Maria Maurino	A.s.d. Sporting Club Pinerolo
Gonin S. / Zappone V.	Simone Gonin	Veronica Zappone	A.s.d. Sporting Club Pinerolo
Gottardi G. / Micheli V.	Giovanni Gottardi	Valentina Micheli	Curling Club Cembra 88 A.s.d.
Margheritis S. / Bennigartner D.	Simone Margheritis	Donatella Bennigartner	A.s.d. Jass Curling Club
Marten G. / Marten E.	Giovanni Marten Perolino	Elisa Marten Perolino	Draghi Curling Club Torino A.s.d.
Masotti V. / Diletti C.	Valentino Giuseppe Masotti	Claudia Diletti	A.s.d. Jass Curling Club
Maurino L. / Cavallo E.	Lorenzo Maurino	Emanuela Cavallo	A.s.d. Sporting Club Pinerolo
Menardi A. / Alverà C.	Antonio Menardi	Claudia Alverà	Curling Club Tofane A.s.d. (105)
Mosaner A. / Cobelli A.	Amos Mosaner	Alice Cobelli	A.S.D. Associazione Curling Cembra
Odorizzi A. / Toniolli M.	Alessandro Odorizzi	Marina Toniolli	Curling Club Cembra 88 A.s.d.
Onnis M. / Salvai L.	Marco Onnis	Lucrezia Salvai	Virtus Piemonte Ghiaccio A.s.d.
Pascale M. / Laurenti L.	Marco Pascale	Lucrezia Laurenti	A.s.d. Fireblock
Perucca S. / Bianchi A.	Stefano Perucca	Amanda Bianchi	Virtus Piemonte Ghiaccio A.s.d.
Retornaz J. / Romei A.	Joël Retornaz	Angela Romei	A.s.d. Sporting Club Pinerolo
Rizzolli L. / Zanotelli O.	Luca Rizzolli	Orietta Zanotelli	Curling Club Cembra 88 A.s.d.
Tosel G. / Tosel R.	Giovanni Tosel	Roberta Tosel	A.s.d. Sporting Club Pinerolo

== Pinerolo Group ==
Was held in Pinerolo from October 13 to December 30, 2018. The top 4 teams made the playoff stage.

Key
Teams to Playoffs

Pinerolo Group Round Robin Standings
	W	L	DSC
Retornaz J. / Romei A.	10	0	136.0
Gonin S. / Zappone V.	8	2	95.2
Maurino L. / Cavallo E.	7	3	127.1
Gallo F. / Maurino A.	6	4	203.2
Onnis M. / Salvai L.	6	4	221.9
Tosel G. / Tosel R.	4	6	111.9
Perucca S. / Bianchi A.	4	6	182.2
Pascale M. / Laurenti L.	4	6	199.9
Dellaia S. / Aliberti S.	3	7	160.3
Cavallo F. / Bertolin A.	3	7	168.3
Marten G. / Marten E.	0	10	313.6

Pinerolo Group Round Robin Summary Table
	Team	A1	A2	A3	A4	A5	A6	A7	A8	A9	A10	A11	Wins	Losses	DSC, cm	Place
A1	Cavallo F. / Bertolin A.	*	8:9	4:9	10:7	11:2	2:11	1:10	9:7	7:11	3:11	4:6	3	7	168.3	10
A2	Dellaia S. / Aliberti S.	9:8	*	8:5	1:11	12:5	0:8	3:11	1:11	8:10	3:7	7:11	3	7	160.3	9
A3	Gallo F. / Maurino A.	9:4	5:8	*	2:9	10:2	10:8	10:5	6:8	7:3	1:7	11:9	6	4	203.2	4
A4	Gonin S. / Zappone V.	7:10	11:1	9:2	*	12:1	8:4	11:3	9:3	8:3	3:5	10:2	8	2	95.2	2
A5	Marten G. / Marten E.	2:11	5:12	2:10	1:12	*	6:8	5:10	2:11	1:10	3:8	0:7	0	10	313.6	11
A6	Maurino L. / Cavallo E.	11:2	8:0	8:10	4:8	8:6	*	9:2	8:7	8:3	4:7	8:2	7	3	127.1	3
A7	Onnis M. / Salvai L.	10:1	11:3	5:10	3:11	10:5	2:9	*	12:11	9:8	2:7	8:4	6	4	221.9	5
A8	Pascale M. / Laurenti L.	7:9	11:1	8:6	3:9	11:2	7:8	11:12	*	10:0	5:7	2:8	4	6	199.9	8
A9	Perucca S. / Bianchi A.	11:7	10:8	3:7	3:8	10:1	3:8	8:9	0:10	*	4:7	10:5	4	6	182.2	7
A10	Retornaz J. / Romei A.	11:3	7:3	7:1	5:3	8:3	7:4	7:2	7:5	7:4	*	9:2	10	0	136.0	1
A11	Tosel R. / Tosel G.	6:4	11:7	9:11	2:10	7:0	2:8	4:8	8:2	5:10	2:9	*	4	6	111.9	6

=== Round Robin Results ===
Draw times 1-9 are listed in Central European Summer Time (UTC+02:00).

Draw times 10-29 are listed in Central European Time (UTC+01:00).

==== Draw 1 ====
Saturday, October 13, 9:00

Sheet 1	1	2	3	4	5	6	7	8	Final
Pascale M. / Laurenti L. 🔨	3	1	2	0	3	1	X	X	10
Perucca S. / Bianchi A.	0	0	0	0	0	0	X	X	0

Sheet 2	1	2	3	4	5	6	7	8	Final
Gonin S. / Zappone V. 🔨	0	1	2	3	2	1	3	X	12
Marten G. / Marten E.	1	0	0	0	0	0	0	X	1

==== Draw 2 ====
Saturday, October 13, 12:00

Sheet 1	1	2	3	4	5	6	7	8	Final
Onnis M. / Salvai L.	0	1	0	0	3	0	2	2	8
Tosel G. / Tosel R. 🔨	1	0	1	1	0	1	0	0	4

Sheet 3	1	2	3	4	5	6	7	8	Final
Marten G. / Marten E.	0	1	0	1	0	0	1	0	3
Retornaz J. / Romei A. 🔨	1	0	3	0	1	1	0	2	8

==== Draw 3 ====
Saturday, October 13, 15:00

Sheet 1	1	2	3	4	5	6	7	8	Final
Gallo F. / Maurino A.	1	0	1	0	0	0	0	X	2
Gonin S. / Zappone V. 🔨	0	4	0	1	1	1	2	X	9

Sheet 2	1	2	3	4	5	6	7	8	Final
Tosel G. / Tosel R.	0	0	0	4	0	0	1	0	5
Perucca S. / Bianchi A. 🔨	1	2	2	0	1	1	0	3	10

Sheet 3	1	2	3	4	5	6	7	8	9	Final
Pascale M. / Laurenti L. 🔨	3	2	0	4	0	0	2	0	0	11
Onnis M. / Salvai L.	0	0	2	0	2	3	0	4	1	12

==== Draw 4 ====
Saturday, October 13, 18:00

Sheet 2	1	2	3	4	5	6	7	8	Final
Retornaz J. / Romei A.	1	1	0	0	4	1	0	X	7
Pascale M. / Laurenti L. 🔨	0	0	3	1	0	0	1	X	5

Sheet 3	1	2	3	4	5	6	7	8	Final
Gonin S. / Zappone V. 🔨	3	0	3	1	0	0	1	X	8
Perucca S. / Bianchi A.	0	1	0	0	1	1	0	X	3

==== Draw 5 ====
Saturday, October 13, 21:00

Sheet 1	1	2	3	4	5	6	7	8	Final
Marten G. / Marten E.	0	0	0	0	0	0	X	X	0
Tosel G. / Tosel R. 🔨	1	1	1	1	2	1	X	X	7

Sheet 2	1	2	3	4	5	6	7	8	Final
Onnis M. / Salvai L.	0	0	1	0	0	3	1	X	5
Gallo F. / Maurino A. 🔨	2	2	0	2	4	0	0	X	10

==== Draw 6 ====
Sunday, October 14, 9:00

Sheet 1	1	2	3	4	5	6	7	8	Final
Tosel G. / Tosel R. 🔨	2	0	1	2	0	2	1	X	8
Pascale M. / Laurenti L.	0	1	0	0	1	0	0	X	2

Sheet 2	1	2	3	4	5	6	7	8	Final
Perucca S. / Bianchi A.	0	2	0	1	1	0	0	X	4
Retornaz J. / Romei A. 🔨	1	0	2	0	0	3	1	X	7

==== Draw 7 ====
Sunday, October 14, 12:00

Sheet 2	1	2	3	4	5	6	7	8	Final
Gallo F. / Maurino A. 🔨	0	2	0	0	0	3	1	0	6
Pascale M. / Laurenti L.	2	0	2	2	1	0	0	1	8

Sheet 3	1	2	3	4	5	6	7	8	Final
Marten G. / Marten E.	0	1	0	0	0	0	X	X	1
Perucca S. / Bianchi A. 🔨	2	0	3	3	1	1	X	X	10

==== Draw 8 ====
Sunday, October 14, 15:00

Sheet 2	1	2	3	4	5	6	7	8	Final
Tosel G. / Tosel R.	0	0	1	0	0	1	0	X	2
Gonin S. / Zappone V. 🔨	2	1	0	2	1	0	4	X	10

Sheet 3	1	2	3	4	5	6	7	8	Final
Retornaz J. / Romei A.	1	0	1	1	2	1	1	X	7
Gallo F. / Maurino A. 🔨	0	1	0	0	0	0	0	X	1

==== Draw 9 ====
Sunday, October 14, 18:00

Sheet 1	1	2	3	4	5	6	7	8	Final
Retornaz J. / Romei A.	0	1	1	1	1	1	0	X	5
Gonin S. / Zappone V. 🔨	1	0	0	0	0	0	2	X	3

==== Draw 10 ====
Saturday, November 17, 17:00

Sheet 1	1	2	3	4	5	6	7	8	Final
Marten G. / Marten E.	0	0	0	0	0	2	X	X	2
Pascale M. / Laurenti L. 🔨	4	1	1	3	2	0	X	X	11

==== Draw 11 ====
Sunday, November 18, 14:30

Sheet 3	1	2	3	4	5	6	7	8	9	Final
Cavallo F. / Bertolin A.	0	2	0	0	0	4	0	2	0	8
Dellaia S. / Aliberti S. 🔨	2	0	1	1	1	0	3	0	1	9

==== Draw 12 ====
Sunday, November 18, 17:30

Sheet 1	1	2	3	4	5	6	7	8	Final
Dellaia S. / Aliberti S.	0	0	0	0	0	0	X	X	0
Maurino L. / Cavallo E. 🔨	1	1	2	2	1	1	X	X	8

==== Draw 13 ====
Monday, November 19, 19:00

Sheet 3	1	2	3	4	5	6	7	8	Final
Marten G. / Marten E.	0	1	0	2	1	1	0	0	5
Onnis M. / Salvai L. 🔨	3	0	1	0	0	0	3	3	10

==== Draw 14 ====
Sunday, November 25, 18:00

Sheet 3	1	2	3	4	5	6	7	8	Final
Perucca S. / Bianchi A.	0	0	2	0	2	0	2	4	10
Dellaia S. / Aliberti S. 🔨	2	1	0	1	0	4	0	0	8

==== Draw 15 ====
Sunday, December 2, 17:30

Sheet 3	1	2	3	4	5	6	7	8	Final
Cavallo F. / Bertolin A.	0	0	1	0	1	0	X	X	2
Maurino L. / Cavallo E. 🔨	4	3	0	2	0	2	X	X	11

==== Draw 16 ====
Sunday, December 2, 18:00

Sheet 2	1	2	3	4	5	6	7	8	Final
Dellaia S. / Aliberti S. 🔨	0	2	1	4	0	2	0	3	12
Marten G. / Marten E.	2	0	0	0	2	0	1	0	5

==== Draw 17 ====
Saturday, December 8, 9:00

Sheet 1	1	2	3	4	5	6	7	8	Final
Maurino L. / Cavallo E. 🔨	4	1	2	0	0	0	1	X	8
Perucca S. / Bianchi A.	0	0	0	1	1	1	0	X	3

Sheet 2	1	2	3	4	5	6	7	8	Final
Tosel G. / Tosel R.	0	1	1	0	0	0	X	X	2
Retornaz J. / Romei A. 🔨	2	0	0	4	2	1	X	X	9

Sheet 3	1	2	3	4	5	6	7	8	Final
Gonin S. / Zappone V.	0	2	1	2	0	4	X	X	9
Pascale M. / Laurenti L. 🔨	2	0	0	0	1	0	X	X	3

==== Draw 18 ====
Saturday, December 8, 12:30

Sheet 1	1	2	3	4	5	6	7	8	Final
Cavallo F. / Bertolin A. 🔨	0	1	0	1	1	3	0	3	9
Pascale M. / Laurenti L.	1	0	5	0	0	0	1	0	7

Sheet 2	1	2	3	4	5	6	7	8	Final
Perucca S. / Bianchi A. 🔨	2	1	2	0	0	1	2	0	8
Onnis M. / Salvai L.	0	0	0	2	2	0	0	5	9

Sheet 3	1	2	3	4	5	6	7	8	Final
Tosel G. / Tosel R. 🔨	3	0	1	0	4	0	1	0	9
Gallo F. / Maurino A.	0	1	0	4	0	4	0	2	11

==== Draw 19 ====
Saturday, December 8, 16:00

Sheet 1	1	2	3	4	5	6	7	8	Final
Retornaz J. / Romei A. 🔨	3	0	4	3	0	1	X	X	11
Cavallo F. / Bertolin A.	0	2	0	0	1	0	X	X	3

Sheet 2	1	2	3	4	5	6	7	8	Final
Dellaia S. / Aliberti S.	0	1	0	0	0	0	X	X	1
Gonin S. / Zappone V. 🔨	4	0	3	2	1	1	X	X	11

Sheet 3	1	2	3	4	5	6	7	8	Final
Maurino L. / Cavallo E.	1	2	1	0	0	1	3	X	8
Tosel G. / Tosel R. 🔨	0	0	0	1	1	0	0	X	2

==== Draw 20 ====
Saturday, December 8, 19:30

Sheet 1	1	2	3	4	5	6	7	8	Final
Maurino L. / Cavallo E.	0	3	0	0	1	0	0	X	4
Gonin S. / Zappone V. 🔨	1	0	1	1	0	3	2	X	8

Sheet 2	1	2	3	4	5	6	7	8	Final
Perucca S. / Bianchi A. 🔨	4	1	0	3	2	0	1	X	11
Cavallo F. / Bertolin A.	0	0	3	0	0	4	0	X	7

Sheet 3	1	2	3	4	5	6	7	8	Final
Pascale M. / Laurenti L.	6	1	1	2	1	0	X	X	11
Dellaia S. / Aliberti S. 🔨	0	0	0	0	0	1	X	X	1

==== Draw 21 ====
Sunday, December 9, 9:00

Sheet 1	1	2	3	4	5	6	7	8	Final
Maurino L. / Cavallo E. 🔨	0	0	2	0	0	2	0	0	4
Retornaz J. / Romei A.	1	1	0	1	1	0	2	1	7

Sheet 2	1	2	3	4	5	6	7	8	Final
Gonin S. / Zappone V. 🔨	1	0	4	1	0	1	0	X	7
Cavallo F. / Bertolin A.	0	2	0	0	4	0	4	X	10

Sheet 3	1	2	3	4	5	6	7	8	Final
Dellaia S. / Aliberti S.	1	1	0	0	0	0	5	0	7
Tosel G. / Tosel R. 🔨	0	0	2	1	2	2	0	4	11

==== Draw 22 ====
Sunday, December 9, 12:30

Sheet 1	1	2	3	4	5	6	7	8	Final
Tosel G. / Tosel R. 🔨	2	0	2	1	1	0	0	X	6
Cavallo F. / Bertolin A.	0	2	0	0	0	1	1	X	4

Sheet 3	1	2	3	4	5	6	7	8	Final
Pascale M. / Laurenti L. 🔨	3	0	0	0	2	0	2	0	7
Maurino L. / Cavallo E.	0	1	1	4	0	1	0	1	8

==== Draw 23 ====
Sunday, December 9, 16:00

Sheet 2	1	2	3	4	5	6	7	8	Final
Onnis M. / Salvai L.	0	0	0	1	0	1	X	X	2
Retornaz J. / Romei A. 🔨	2	1	2	0	2	0	X	X	7

Sheet 3	1	2	3	4	5	6	7	8	Final
Gallo F. / Maurino A. 🔨	0	2	0	2	0	0	1	X	5
Dellaia S. / Aliberti S.	1	0	2	0	2	3	0	X	8

==== Draw 24 ====
Sunday, December 9, 19:30

Sheet 1	1	2	3	4	5	6	7	8	Final
Dellaia S. / Aliberti S.	1	1	0	1	0	0	0	X	3
Retornaz J. / Romei A. 🔨	0	0	4	0	1	1	1	X	7

Sheet 2	1	2	3	4	5	6	7	8	Final
Gallo F. / Maurino A.	0	0	3	0	2	1	1	X	7
Perucca S. / Bianchi A. 🔨	1	1	0	1	0	0	0	X	3

Sheet 3	1	2	3	4	5	6	7	8	Final
Onnis M. / Salvai L. 🔨	0	0	0	2	0	0	X	X	2
Maurino L. / Cavallo E.	3	1	3	0	1	1	X	X	9

==== Draw 25 ====
Thursday, December 13, 19:30

Sheet 2	1	2	3	4	5	6	7	8	Final
Onnis M. / Salvai L.	1	0	3	0	4	0	3	X	11
Dellaia S. / Aliberti S. 🔨	0	1	0	1	0	1	0	X	3

==== Draw 26 ====
Sunday, December 16, 18:00

Sheet 3	1	2	3	4	5	6	7	8	Final
Onnis M. / Salvai L. 🔨	5	0	1	2	1	1	X	X	10
Cavallo F. / Bertolin A.	0	1	0	0	0	0	X	X	1

==== Draw 27 ====
Sunday, December 30, 10:00

Sheet 1	1	2	3	4	5	6	7	8	Final
Cavallo F. / Bertolin A.	0	0	0	0	4	0	0	X	4
Gallo F. / Maurino A. 🔨	1	1	2	2	0	1	2	X	9

Sheet 2	1	2	3	4	5	6	7	8	Final
Marten G. / Marten E.	0	1	1	2	0	0	0	2	6
Maurino L. / Cavallo E. 🔨	2	0	0	0	4	1	1	0	8

==== Draw 28 ====
Sunday, December 30, 14:00

Sheet 1	1	2	3	4	5	6	7	8	9	Final
Gallo F. / Maurino A.	0	0	0	3	0	1	1	3	2	10
Maurino L. / Cavallo E. 🔨	3	2	1	0	2	0	0	0	0	8

Sheet 2	1	2	3	4	5	6	7	8	Final
Cavallo F. / Bertolin A. 🔨	1	4	2	0	2	2	X	X	11
Marten G. / Marten E.	0	0	0	2	0	0	X	X	2

Sheet 3	1	2	3	4	5	6	7	8	Final
Gonin S. / Zappone V. 🔨	2	3	0	3	1	2	X	X	11
Onnis M. / Salvai L.	0	0	3	0	0	0	X	X	3

==== Draw 29 ====
Sunday, December 30, 18:00

Sheet 2	1	2	3	4	5	6	7	8	Final
Marten G. / Marten E.	0	0	0	2	0	0	X	X	2
Gallo F. / Maurino A. 🔨	2	2	3	0	2	1	X	X	10

== Cembra Group ==
Was held in Cembra from November 30 to December 28, 2018. The top team made the playoff stage.

Cembra Group Round Robin Standings
	W	L	DSC
Mosaner A. / Cobelli A.	3	0	226.9
Rizzolli L. / Zanotelli O.	2	1	108.5
Odorizzi A. / Toniolli M.	1	2	183.3
Gottardi G. / Micheli V.	0	3	184.4

Cembra Group Round Robin Summary Table
	Team	B1	B2	B3	B4	Wins	Losses	DSC, cm	Place
B1	Gottardi G. / Micheli V.	*	2:11	6:7	6:7	0	3	184.4	4
B2	Mosaner A. / Cobelli A.	11:2	*	9:1	9:0	3	0	226.9	1
B3	Odorizzi A. / Toniolli M.	7:6	1:9	*	3:7	1	2	183.3	3
B4	Rizzolli L. / Zanotelli O.	7:6	0:9	7:3	*	2	1	108.5	2

=== Round Robin Results ===
All draw times are listed in Central European Time (UTC+01:00).

==== Draw 1 ====
Friday, November 30, 20:30

Sheet 1	1	2	3	4	5	6	7	8	Final
Mosaner A. / Cobelli A.	3	0	2	3	0	3	X	X	11
Gottardi G. / Micheli V. 🔨	0	1	0	0	1	0	X	X	2

==== Draw 2 ====
Tuesday, December 4, 20:30

Sheet 2	1	2	3	4	5	6	7	8	Final
Odorizzi A. / Toniolli M.	0	0	0	0	1	2	0	X	3
Rizzolli L. / Zanotelli O. 🔨	1	3	1	1	0	0	1	X	7

==== Draw 3 ====
Friday, December 7, 20:30

Sheet 1	1	2	3	4	5	6	7	8	Final
Gottardi G. / Micheli V.	0	0	0	2	0	2	2	0	6
Odorizzi A. / Toniolli M. 🔨	2	1	1	0	2	0	0	1	7

Sheet 2	1	2	3	4	5	6	7	8	Final
Mosaner A. / Cobelli A. 🔨	1	2	1	3	1	1	X	X	9
Rizzolli L. / Zanotelli O.	0	0	0	0	0	0	X	X	0

==== Draw 4 ====
Friday, December 28, 20:30

Sheet 1	1	2	3	4	5	6	7	8	Final
Mosaner A. / Cobelli A.	2	2	2	2	1	0	X	X	9
Odorizzi A. / Toniolli M. 🔨	0	0	0	0	0	1	X	X	1

Sheet 2	1	2	3	4	5	6	7	8	Final
Gottardi G. / Micheli V.	0	0	2	0	1	3	0	0	6
Rizzolli L. / Zanotelli O. 🔨	2	1	0	1	0	0	2	1	7

== Cortina Group ==
Was held in Cortina d'Ampezzo from December 17 to 28, 2018. The top team made the playoff stage.

Cortina Group Round Robin Standings
	W	L	DSC
De Zanna F. / Lo Deserto M.	3	0	166.2
Constantiti D. / Constantini S.	2	1	235.9
Colli G. / Girardi V.	1	2	174.9
Menardi A. / Alverà C.	0	3	399.2

Cortina Group Round Robin Summary Table
	Team	C1	C2	C3	C4	Wins	Losses	DSC, cm	Place
C1	Colli G. / Girardi V.	*	4:6	6:7	2:0	1	2	174.9	3
C2	Constantiti D. / Constantini S.	6:4	*	6:7	2:0	2	1	235.9	2
C3	De Zanna F. / Lo Deserto M.	7:6	7:6	*	2:0	3	0	166.2	1
C4	Menardi A. / Alverà C.	0:2	0:2	0:2	*	0	3	399.2	4

=== Round Robin Results ===
All draw times are listed in Central European Time (UTC+01:00).

==== Draw 1 ====
Monday, December 17, 14:30

Sheet 1	1	2	3	4	5	6	7	8	Final
Colli G. / Girardi V. 🔨	1	1	X	X	X	X	X	X	2
Menardi A. / Alverà C.	0	0	X	X	X	X	X	X	0

Sheet 2	1	2	3	4	5	6	7	8	9	Final
Constantiti D. / Constantini S. 🔨	2	0	0	2	0	0	2	0	0	6
De Zanna F. / Lo Deserto M.	0	2	1	0	1	1	0	1	1	7

==== Draw 2 ====
Tuesday, December 18, 15:00

Sheet 1	1	2	3	4	5	6	7	8	Final
Menardi A. / Alverà C.	0	0	X	X	X	X	X	X	0
Constantiti D. / Constantini S. 🔨	1	1	X	X	X	X	X	X	2

Sheet 2	1	2	3	4	5	6	7	8	Final
Colli G. / Girardi V.	1	0	2	0	2	1	0	0	6
De Zanna F. / Lo Deserto M. 🔨	0	1	0	3	0	0	2	1	7

==== Draw 3 ====
Thursday, December 20, 15:00

Sheet 1	1	2	3	4	5	6	7	8	Final
De Zanna F. / Lo Deserto M. 🔨	1	1	X	X	X	X	X	X	2
Menardi A. / Alverà C.	0	0	X	X	X	X	X	X	0

==== Draw 4 ====
Friday, December 28, 18:30

Sheet 1	1	2	3	4	5	6	7	8	Final
Colli G. / Girardi V. 🔨	0	1	0	1	0	1	1	X	4
Constantiti D. / Constantini S.	1	0	2	0	3	0	0	X	6

== Sesto San Giovanni Group ==
Was held at the Palasesto venue in Sesto San Giovanni from October 29 to December 17, 2018. The top 2 teams made the playoffs.

Sesto San Giovanni Group Round Robin Standings
	W	L	DSC
Masotti V. / Diletti C.	3	1	305.6
Arienti A. / Merlo G.	3	1	376.1
Bozzi A. / Buitta V.	2	2	280.9
Bianchi A. / Erba M.	1	3	298.4
Margheritis S. / Bennigartner D.	1	3	382.6

Sesto San Giovanni Group Round Robin Summary Table
	Team	D1	D2	D3	D4	D5	Wins	Losses	DSC, cm	Place
D1	Arienti A. / Merlo G.	*	4:6	6:3	6:4	8:4	3	1	376.1	2
D2	Bianchi A. / Erba M.	6:4	*	4:5	7:10	8:9	1	3	298.4	4
D3	Bozzi A. / Buitta V.	3:6	5:4	*	6:3	6:7	2	2	280.9	3
D4	Margheritis S. / Bennigartner D.	4:6	10:7	3:6	*	5:9	1	3	382.6	5
D5	Masotti V. / Diletti C.	4:8	9:8	7:6	9:5	*	3	1	305.6	1

=== Round Robin Results ===
All draw times are listed in Central European Time (UTC+01:00).

==== Draw 1 ====
Monday, October 29, 21:30

Sheet 2	1	2	3	4	5	6	7	8	Final
Margheritis S. / Bennigartner D. 🔨	1	0	1	0	1	0	1	0	4
Arienti A. / Merlo G.	0	1	0	1	0	2	0	2	6

==== Draw 2 ====
Sunday, November 4, 21:00

Sheet 2	1	2	3	4	5	6	7	8	9	Final
Bianchi A. / Erba M.	0	1	0	1	0	1	0	1	0	4
Bozzi A. / Buitta V. 🔨	1	0	1	0	1	0	1	0	1	5

==== Draw 3 ====
Monday, November 5, 21:30

Sheet 2	1	2	3	4	5	6	7	8	Final
Arienti A. / Merlo G. 🔨	2	0	2	0	2	0	2	0	8
Masotti V. / Diletti C.	0	1	0	1	0	1	0	1	4

==== Draw 4 ====
Monday, November 12, 21:30

Sheet 2	1	2	3	4	5	6	7	8	Final
Bozzi A. / Buitta V.	0	1	1	0	2	1	1	0	6
Margheritis S. / Bennigartner D. 🔨	1	0	0	1	0	0	0	1	3

==== Draw 5 ====
Monday, November 19, 21:30

Sheet 2	1	2	3	4	5	6	7	8	Final
Masotti V. / Diletti C.	0	2	2	3	0	0	2	0	9
Bianchi A. / Erba M. 🔨	2	0	0	0	3	2	0	1	8

==== Draw 6 ====
Sunday, November 25, 21:00

Sheet 2	1	2	3	4	5	6	7	8	Final
Margheritis S. / Bennigartner D.	0	2	0	1	0	1	1	0	5
Masotti V. / Diletti C. 🔨	3	0	2	0	1	0	0	3	9

==== Draw 7 ====
Monday, November 26, 21:30

Sheet 2	1	2	3	4	5	6	7	8	Final
Bozzi A. / Buitta V. 🔨	0	2	0	0	1	0	0	X	3
Arienti A. / Merlo G.	1	0	1	1	0	2	1	X	6

==== Draw 8 ====
Sunday, December 2, 21:00

Sheet 2	1	2	3	4	5	6	7	8	Final
Bianchi A. / Erba M. 🔨	1	2	0	0	4	0	0	X	7
Margheritis S. / Bennigartner D.	0	0	3	4	0	2	1	X	10

==== Draw 9 ====
Monday, December 3, 21:30

Sheet 2	1	2	3	4	5	6	7	8	Final
Masotti V. / Diletti C.	0	1	1	3	0	0	0	2	7
Bozzi A. / Buitta V. 🔨	1	0	0	0	1	3	1	0	6

==== Draw 10 ====
Sunday, December 16, 21:00

Sheet 2	1	2	3	4	5	6	7	8	Final
Arienti A. / Merlo G.	0	0	1	0	2	1	0	X	4
Bianchi A. / Erba M. 🔨	1	1	0	3	0	0	1	X	6

== Playoffs ==
(Finale)
Was held as "double knockout" in Cembra from January 25 to 27, 2019

=== Stage 1 ===
Game 1
Gonin S. / Zappone V.	13
Arienti A. / Merlo G.	1
Retornaz J. / Romei A.	18
Masotti V. / Diletti C.	1
Gallo F. / Maurino A.	11
De Zanna F. / Lo Deserto M.	9
Mosaner A. / Cobelli A.	4
Maurino L. / Cavallo E.	9

Game 2
Gonin S. / Zappone V.	8
Retornaz J. / Romei A.	11
Gallo F. / Maurino A.	4
Maurino L. / Cavallo E.	8

Game 3 (winner to final)
Retornaz J. / Romei A.	9
Maurino L. / Cavallo E.	4

=== Stage 2 ===
Game 4
Arienti A. / Merlo G.	5
Masotti V. / Diletti C.	6
De Zanna F. / Lo Deserto M.	2
Mosaner A. / Cobelli A.	13

Game 5
Gallo F. / Maurino A.	11
Masotti V. / Diletti C.	1
Gonin S. / Zappone V.	4
Mosaner A. / Cobelli A.	8

Game 6 (loser to bronze match)
Gallo F. / Maurino A.	6
Mosaner A. / Cobelli A.	8

Game 7 (winner to final; loser to bronze match)
Mosaner A. / Cobelli A.	7
Maurino L. / Cavallo E.	3

=== Draw 1 ===
Friday, January 25, 17:00

Sheet 1	1	2	3	4	5	6	7	8	Final
Gonin S. / Zappone V.	3	0	4	2	2	2	X	X	13
Arienti A. / Merlo G. 🔨	0	1	0	0	0	0	X	X	1

Sheet 2	1	2	3	4	5	6	7	8	Final
Retornaz J. / Romei A. 🔨	0	5	2	2	4	3	2	X	18
Masotti V. / Diletti C.	1	0	0	0	0	0	0	X	1

=== Draw 2 ===
Friday, January 25, 20:00

Sheet 1	1	2	3	4	5	6	7	8	Final
Gallo F. / Maurino A.	1	0	6	1	0	1	0	2	11
De Zanna F. / Lo Deserto M. 🔨	0	2	0	0	3	0	4	0	9

Sheet 2	1	2	3	4	5	6	7	8	Final
Mosaner A. / Cobelli A.	0	0	0	1	0	3	0	X	4
Maurino L. / Cavallo E. 🔨	3	1	1	0	2	0	2	X	9

=== Draw 3 ===
Saturday, January 26, 10:00

Sheet 1	1	2	3	4	5	6	7	8	Final
Masotti V. / Diletti C.	0	0	0	2	1	2	1	0	6
Arienti A. / Merlo G. 🔨	1	2	1	0	0	0	0	1	5

Sheet 2	1	2	3	4	5	6	7	8	Final
Mosaner A. / Cobelli A.	0	6	0	5	1	1	X	X	13
De Zanna F. / Lo Deserto M. 🔨	1	0	1	0	0	0	X	X	2

=== Draw 4 ===
Saturday, January 26, 13:00

Sheet 1	1	2	3	4	5	6	7	8	Final
Retornaz J. / Romei A.	0	6	0	1	0	4	0	X	11
Gonin S. / Zappone V. 🔨	2	0	2	0	3	0	1	X	8

Sheet 2	1	2	3	4	5	6	7	8	Final
Maurino L. / Cavallo E. 🔨	0	5	1	0	1	1	0	X	8
Gallo F. / Maurino A.	1	0	0	1	0	0	2	X	4

=== Draw 5 ===
Saturday, January 26, 17:00

Sheet 1	1	2	3	4	5	6	7	8	Final
Mosaner A. / Cobelli A.	0	0	3	3	1	1	0	X	8
Gonin S. / Zappone V. 🔨	1	2	0	0	0	0	1	X	4

Sheet 2	1	2	3	4	5	6	7	8	Final
Masotti V. / Diletti C. 🔨	1	0	0	0	0	0	0	X	1
Gallo F. / Maurino A.	0	3	2	1	2	2	1	X	11

=== Draw 6 ===
Saturday, January 26, 20:00

Sheet 1	1	2	3	4	5	6	7	8	Final
Maurino L. / Cavallo E.	0	0	0	1	0	3	0	X	4
Retornaz J. / Romei A. 🔨	2	1	1	0	2	0	3	X	9

Sheet 2	1	2	3	4	5	6	7	8	Final
Gallo F. / Maurino A.	0	1	2	0	2	0	0	1	6
Mosaner A. / Cobelli A. 🔨	1	0	0	1	0	4	2	0	8

=== Draw 7 ===
Sunday, January 27, 9:30

Sheet 1	1	2	3	4	5	6	7	8	Final
Mosaner A. / Cobelli A.	2	0	0	1	2	2	0	X	7
Maurino L. / Cavallo E. 🔨	0	1	1	0	0	0	1	X	3

=== Bronze-medal match ===
Sunday, January 27, 14:00

Sheet 2	1	2	3	4	5	6	7	8	Final
Gallo F. / Maurino A.	0	1	0	0	0	0	X	X	1
Maurino L. / Cavallo E. 🔨	3	0	3	1	1	3	X	X	11

=== Final ===
Sunday, January 27, 14:00

Sheet 1	1	2	3	4	5	6	7	8	Final
Mosaner A. / Cobelli A. 🔨	1	0	2	3	1	0	0	X	7
Retornaz J. / Romei A.	0	1	0	0	0	3	1	X	5

== Final standings ==
Place	Team	Woman	Man	Games	Wins	Losses	DSC, cm
1st place, gold medalist(s)	Mosaner A. / Cobelli A.	Amos Mosaner	Alice Cobelli	9	8	1	
2nd place, silver medalist(s)	Retornaz J. / Romei A.	Joël Retornaz	Angela Romei	14	13	1	
3rd place, bronze medalist(s)	Maurino L. / Cavallo E.	Lorenzo Maurino	Emanuela Cavallo	15	10	5	
4	Gallo F. / Maurino A.	Fabrizio Gallo	Anna Maria Maurino	15	8	7	
5	Masotti V. / Diletti C.	Valentino Giuseppe Masotti	Claudia Diletti	7	4	3	
5	Gonin S. / Zappone V.	Simone Gonin	Veronica Zappone	13	9	4	
7	Arienti A. / Merlo G.	Alberto Arienti	Greta Merlo	6	3	3	
7	De Zanna F. / Lo Deserto M.	Francesco De Zanna	Marta Lo Deserto	5	3	2	
9	Onnis M. / Salvai L.	Marco Onnis	Lucrezia Salvai	10	6	4	221.9
9	Rizzolli L. / Zanotelli O.	Luca Rizzolli	Orietta Zanotelli	3	2	1	108.5
9	Constantiti D. / Constantini S.	Daniele Constantini	Stefania Constantini	3	2	1	235.9
9	Bozzi A. / Buitta V.	Antonio Francesco Bozzi	Valentina Buitta	4	2	2	280.9
13	Tosel R. / Tosel G.	Giovanni Tosel	Roberta Tosel	10	4	6	111.9
13	Odorizzi A. / Toniolli M.	Alessandro Odorizzi	Marina Toniolli	3	1	2	183.3
13	Colli G. / Girardi V.	Giacomo Colli	Valeria Girardi	3	1	2	174.9
13	Bianchi A. / Erba M.	Andrea Maria Bianchi	Martina Erba	4	1	3	298.4
17	Perucca S. / Bianchi A.	Stefano Perucca	Amanda Bianchi	10	4	6	182.2
17	Gottardi G. / Micheli V.	Giovanni Gottardi	Valentina Micheli	3	0	3	184.4
17	Menardi A. / Alverà C.	Antonio Menardi	Claudia Alverà	3	0	3	399.2
17	Margheritis S. / Bennigartner D.	Simone Margheritis	Donatella Bennigartner	4	1	3	382.6
21	Pascale M. / Laurenti L.	Marco Pascale	Lucrezia Laurenti	10	4	6	199.9
22	Dellaia S. / Aliberti S.	Silvio Dellaia	Sara Aliberti	10	3	7	160.3
23	Cavallo F. / Bertolin A.	Fabio Cavallo	Alice Bertolin	10	3	7	168.3
24	Marten G. / Marten E.	Giovanni Marten Perolino	Elisa Marten Perolino	10	0	10	313.6

== See also ==
- 2019 Italian Men's Curling Championship
- 2019 Italian Women's Curling Championship
- 2019 Italian Mixed Curling Championship
- 2019 Italian Junior Curling Championships
