= 2019 Italian Women's Curling Championship =

- Host city: Pinerolo (playoffs)
- Dates: November 2, 2018 – April 14, 2019
- Winner: Dolomiti FONTEL Gaspari (Diana Gaspari)
- Skip: Diana Gaspari
- Third: Stefania Constantini
- Second: Chiara Olivieri
- Lead: Valeria Girardi
- Alternate: Giulia Zardini Lacedelli
- Coach: Carlo Alessandro Zisa
- Finalist: 3S Luserna Luca Lovero (Veronica Zappone)

The 43rd 2019 Italian Women's Curling Championship (Italian: Campionati Senior - Serie A femminile - Anno Sportivo 2018-2019) was held from November 2, 2018 to April 14, 2019 in two stages: the group stage (round robin) from November 2, 2018 to March 31, 2019 and the playoff stage from April 13 to 14, 2019.

Five teams took part in the championship.

The winners of the championship were the "Dolomiti FONTEL Gaspari" team (skip Diana Gaspari), who beat the "3S Luserna Luca Lovero" team (skip Veronica Zappone) in the final. The bronze medal was won by the "CC Tofane F - Hotel Menardi" team (skip Federica Apollonio).

The championship was held in conjunction with the 2019 Italian Men's Curling Championship.

== Competition format ==
At the first, group stage (Round robin), the teams play among themselves in a four-round round robin system. If two teams had the same number of wins, they were ranked among themselves according to the result of two their matches; if the number of victories for three or more teams is equal, teams were ranked according to the results of the sum of Draw Shot Challenge (DSC, in centimetres; the smaller value, the higher the rank). The four best teams go to the second stage, the playoff, using the Page playoff system (two best teams, following the results of the group round, hold a match for a direct bye to the final (playoffs-1). The 3rd and 4th teams played, with the winners going to the semifinals (playoffs-2). The semifinal was between the loser in the first match and a winner in the second. In the finals, gold was to the winner of the 1 vs. 2 playoff game and the winner of the semifinal. Losers in the semifinals and the playoffs-2 game played for bronze medal.

== Teams ==
Team	Skip	Third	Second	Lead	Alternate	Coach
3S Luserna Luca Lovero	Veronica Zappone	Angela Romei	Emanuela Cavallo	Anna Maria Maurino		Lucilla Macchiati
C.C. Tofane F - Hotel Menardi	Federica Apollonio	Georgia Apollonio	Stefania Menardi	Michela Alverà	Marianna Menardi	Claudia Alverà
Dolomiti FONTEL Gaspari	Diana Gaspari	Stefania Constantini	Chiara Olivieri	Valeria Girardi	Giulia Zardini Lacedelli	Carlo Alessandro Zisa
Fireblock	Denise Pimpini (4th)	Lucrezia Laurenti	Emanuela Matino	Fiona Grace Simpson (skip)	Sara Aliberti	Fabio Sola
Torino150-Draghette	Marta Benedetto (4th)	Elena Dami (skip)	Chiara Bertinetti	Elisa Dami	Grazia Ferrero	Massimo Tortia

== Round robin ==
	Team	1	2	3	4	5	Wins	Losses	DSC, cm	Place
1	3S Luserna Luca Lovero (Veronica Zappone)	*	10:4; 8:6	8:7; 7:3	6:4; 9:5	6:3; 8:4	8	0	222,9	1
2	C.C. Tofane F - Hotel Menardi (Federica Apollonio)	4:10; 6:8	*	2:13; 8:2	9:5; 8:7	12:6; 4:5	4	4	170,7	3
3	Dolomiti FONTEL Gaspari (Diana Gaspari)	7:8; 3:7	13:2; 2:8	*	11:7; 11:4	8:7; 7:6	5	3	158,6	2
4	Fireblock (Fiona Grace Simpson)	4:6; 5:9	5:9; 7:8	7:11; 4:11	*	7:6; 5:7	1	7	126,8	5
5	Torino150-Draghette (Elena Dami)	3:6; 4:8	6:12; 5:4	7:8; 6:7	6:7; 7:5	*	2	6	132,0	4

teams to playoffs

== Playoffs ==
Page playoff system
(1)	3S Luserna Luca Lovero	7
(2)	Dolomiti FONTEL Gaspari	6
(3)	C.C. Tofane F - Hotel Menardi	11
(4)	Torino150-Draghette	4

Semifinal
Dolomiti FONTEL Gaspari	10
C.C. Tofane F - Hotel Menardi	9

Final
3S Luserna Luca Lovero	6
Dolomiti FONTEL Gaspari	7

Bronze medal match
C.C. Tofane F - Hotel Menardi	4
Torino150-Draghette	3

=== 1 vs. 2 ===
April 13, 10:00 am

Team	1	2	3	4	5	6	7	8	9	10	Final
3S Luserna Luca Lovero	1	0	3	0	1	1	1	0	0	0	7
Dolomiti FONTEL Gaspari	0	1	0	1	0	0	0	1	2	1	6

=== 3 vs. 4 ===
April 13, 2:30 pm

Team	1	2	3	4	5	6	7	8	9	10	Final
C.C. Tofane F - Hotel Menardi	1	0	0	2	4	3	0	1	X	X	11
Torino150-Draghette	0	1	1	0	0	0	2	0	X	X	4

=== Semifinal ===
April 13, 7:30 pm

Team	1	2	3	4	5	6	7	8	9	10	Final
Dolomiti FONTEL Gaspari	1	0	0	3	1	4	0	0	0	1	10
C.C. Tofane F - Hotel Menardi	0	2	3	0	0	0	2	2	0	0	9

=== Bronze medal match ===
April 14, 9:30 am

Team	1	2	3	4	5	6	7	8	9	10	11	Final
C.C. Tofane F - Hotel Menardi	0	0	1	1	0	0	0	1	0	0	1	4
Torino150-Draghette	0	0	0	0	1	0	1	0	0	1	0	3

=== Final ===
April 14, 2:00 pm

Team	1	2	3	4	5	6	7	8	9	10	Final
Dolomiti FONTEL Gaspari	1	0	0	0	4	1	0	1	0	0	7
3S Luserna Luca Lovero	0	1	2	1	0	0	0	0	1	1	6

== Final standings ==
Place	Team	Skip	Games	Wins	Losses
1st place, gold medalist(s)	Dolomiti FONTEL Gaspari	Diana Gaspari	11	7	4
2nd place, silver medalist(s)	3S Luserna Luca Lovero	Veronica Zappone	10	9	1
3rd place, bronze medalist(s)	C.C. Tofane F - Hotel Menardi	Federica Apollonio	11	6	5
4	Torino150-Draghette	Elena Dami	10	2	8
5	Fireblock	Fiona Grace Simpson	8	1	7

== See also ==
- 2019 Italian Men's Curling Championship
- 2019 Italian Mixed Curling Championship
- 2019 Italian Mixed Doubles Curling Championship
- 2019 Italian Junior Curling Championships
