= Giacomo Colli =

Italian curler

- Curler
- Born: 19 October 2001 (age 25); Pieve di Cadore, Italy

Team
- Curling club: C.C. 66 Cortina, Cortina d'Ampezzo; CC Dolomiti, Cortina d'Ampezzo

Curling career
- Member Association: Italy
- World Championship: 1 (2025)
Medal record
Men's curling
Representing Italy
Italian Men's Championship
| Silver medal – second place | 2023 Cembra |
| Silver medal – second place | 2024 Cembra |
| Bronze medal – third place | 2022 Pinerolo |
Italian Mixed Doubles Championship
| Bronze medal – third place | 2018 Pinerolo |
| Bronze medal – third place | 2020 Cembra |
| Bronze medal – third place | 2024 Cortina d'Ampezzo |

Giacomo Colli (born 19 October 2001 in Pieve di Cadore) is an Italian curler from Cortina d'Ampezzo, Italy.

== Teams and events ==
| Season | Skip | Third | Second | Lead | Alternate | Coach | Events |
|---|---|---|---|---|---|---|---|
| 2015–16 | Daniele Constantini | Giacomo Colli | Edoardo Alfonsi | Luca Ossi | | Chiara Olivieri | IJCC 2016 (bronze) |
| 2016–17 | Daniele Constantini | Giacomo Colli | Francesco De Zanna | Luca Ossi | Edoardo Alfonsi | Massimo Antonelli | IJCC 2017 (silver) |
| 2017–18 | Daniele Constantini | Giacomo Colli | Francesco De Zanna | Edoardo Alfonsi | | Massimo Antonelli | IJCC 2018 (bronze) |
| 2018–19 | Giacomo Colli | Alberto Zisa | Francesco De Zanna | Nicolo Zandomenego | Edoardo Alfonsi | Diana Gaspari | IJCC 2019 (silver) |
| 2018–19 | Giacomo Colli | Daniele Constantini | Alberto Zisa | Francesco De Zanna | Edoardo Alfonsi | | IMCC 2019 (4th) |
| 2019–20 | Giacomo Colli | Alberto Zisa | Francesco De Zanna | Simone Piffer | Luca Casagrande | Diana Gaspari | WJCC 2020 (9th) |
| 2020–21 | Giacomo Colli | Alberto Zisa | Francesco De Zanna | Edoardo Alfonsi | | Diana Gaspari | IMCC 2021 (4th) |
| 2021–22 | Giacomo Colli | Francesco De Zanna | Mattia Curtolo | Alberto Cavallero | Edoardo Caproni | Diana Gaspari | IJCC 2022 (gold) |
| 2021–22 | Giacomo Colli | Francesco De Zanna | Simone Piffer | Daniele Casagrande | Stefano Gilli | Diana Gaspari, Alessandro Zisa | WJCC 2022 (8th) |
| 2021–22 | Giacomo Colli | Alberto Zisa | Francesco De Zanna | Simone Piffer | Edoardo Alfonsi | Diana Gaspari | IMCC 2022 (bronze) |
| 2022–23 | Giacomo Colli | Francesco De Zanna | Simone Piffer | Stefano Gilli | Francesco Vigliani | Marco Mariani | WJCC 2023 (5th) |
| 2022–23 | Giacomo Colli | Alberto Zisa | Francesco De Zanna | Edoardo Alfonsi | Alberto Cavallero | Diana Gaspari | IMCC 2023 (silver) |
| 2023–24 | Alberto Zisa (Fourth) | Giacomo Colli (Skip) | Francesco De Zanna | Marcello Pachner | Edoardo Alfonsi | Diana Gaspari | IMCC 2024 (silver) |
| 2024–25 | Giacomo Colli | Stefano Gilli | Andrea Gilli | Francesco Vigliani | Stefano Spiller | Wolfgang Burba | WUG 2025 (6th) |
| 2024–25 | Alberto Zisa (Fourth) | Giacomo Colli (Skip) | Francesco De Zanna | Marcello Pachner | Edoardo Alfonsi | Diana Gaspari | IMCC 2025 (4th) |
| 2024–25 | Joël Retornaz | Amos Mosaner | Sebastiano Arman | Mattia Giovanella | Giacomo Colli | Ryan Fry | WCC 2025 (10th) |
| 2025–26 | Alberto Zisa (Fourth) | Giacomo Colli (Skip) | Francesco De Zanna | Fabio Ribotta | | | |

=== Mixed doubles ===
| Season | Female | Male | Events |
|---|---|---|---|
| 2017–18 | Valeria Girardi | Giacomo Colli | IMDCC 2018 (bronze) |
| 2018–19 | Valeria Girardi | Giacomo Colli | IMDCC 2019 (13th) |
| 2019–20 | Diana Gaspari | Giacomo Colli | IMDCC 2020 (bronze) |
| 2021–22 | Diana Gaspari | Giacomo Colli | IMDCC 2022 (4th) |
| 2022–23 | Diana Gaspari | Giacomo Colli | IMDCC 2023 (6th) |
| 2023–24 | Vittoria Maioni | Giacomo Colli | IMDCC 2024 (bronze) |
| 2024–25 | Marta Lo Deserto | Giacomo Colli | IMDCC 2025 (4th) |

== Personal life ==
As of 2025 he is a student at the Ca' Foscari University of Venice. He started curling in 2009 at the age of 8.
