= Francesco De Zanna (curler) =

Italian curler (born 2002)

- Curler ♂
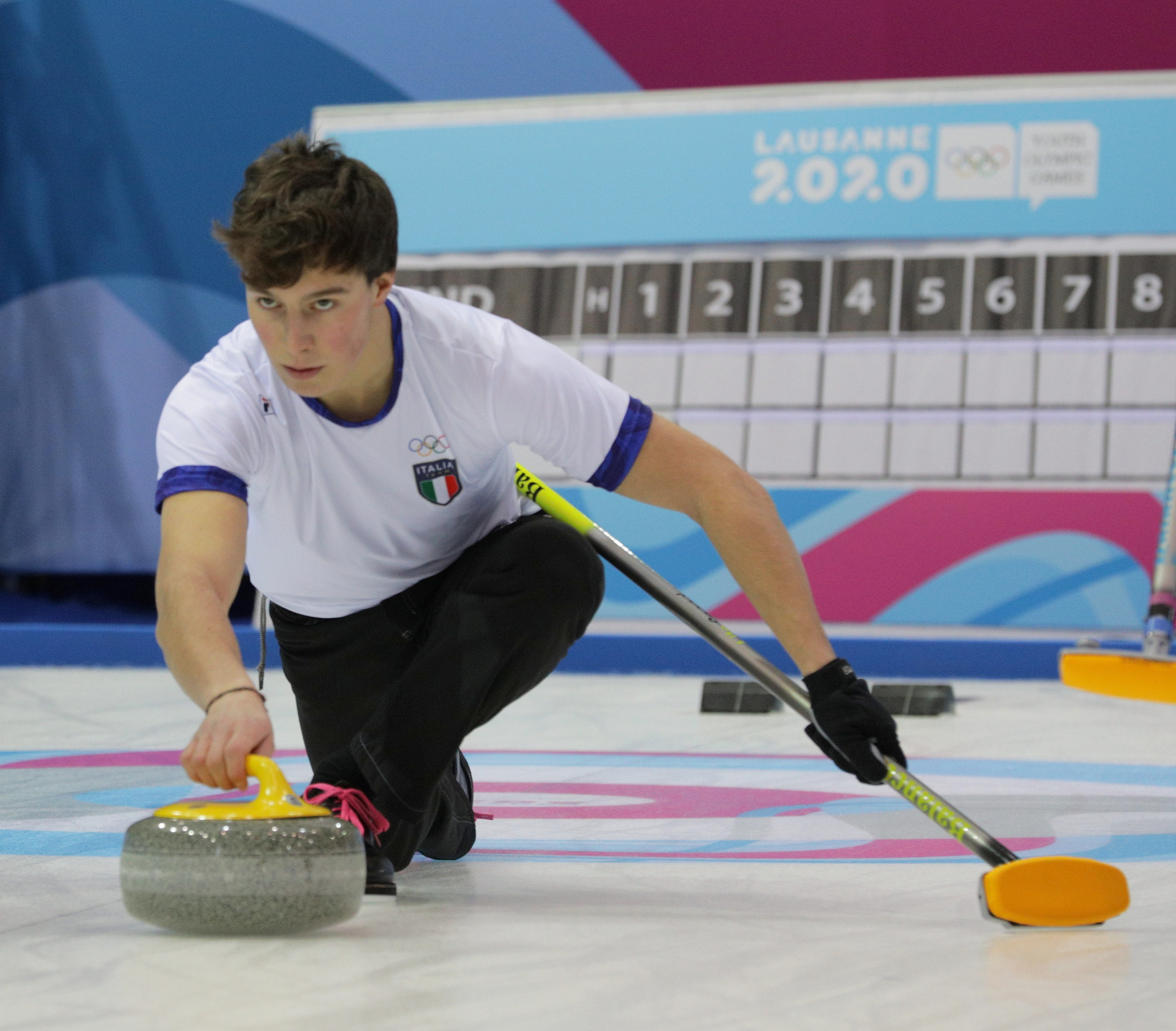
- Born: 17 October 2002 (age 24); San Candido, Italy

Team
- Curling club: C.C. 66 Cortina, Cortina d'Ampezzo; CC Dolomiti, Cortina d'Ampezzo
- Skip: Alberto Zisa
- Fourth: Mattia Giovanella
- Second: Francesco De Zanna
- Lead: Francesco Vigliani
- Mixed doubles partner: Giulia Zardini Lacedelli

Curling career
- Member Association: Italy
- World Championship: 1 (2024)
- World Mixed Doubles Championship: 1 (2024)
- World Junior Curling Championship: 4 (2020, 2022, 2023, 2024)
- Other appearances: Winter Youth Olympics: 1 (2020); Winter World University Games: 1 (2025)
Medal record
Men's curling
Representing Italy
World Championships
Bronze medal – third place	2024 Schaffhausen
Italian Men's Championship
Silver medal – second place	2023 Cembra
Silver medal – second place	2024 Cembra
Bronze medal – third place	2022 Pinerolo
Italian Mixed Doubles Championship
Silver medal – second place	2023 Pinerolo
Silver medal – second place	2024 Cortina d'Ampezzo
Silver medal – second place	2025 Bruneck

Francesco De Zanna (born 17 October 2002 in San Candido) is an Italian curler from Cortina d'Ampezzo, Italy. He currently plays second on Team Alberto Zisa.

== Teams and events ==
=== Men's ===
Season	Skip	Third	Second	Lead	Alternate	Coach	Events
2016–17	Daniele Constantini	Giacomo Colli	Francesco De Zanna	Luca Ossi	Edoardo Alfonsi	Massimo Antonelli	IJCC 2017 (silver)
2017–18	Daniele Constantini	Giacomo Colli	Francesco De Zanna	Edoardo Alfonsi		Massimo Antonelli	IJCC 2018 (bronze)
2018–19	Giacomo Colli	Alberto Zisa	Francesco De Zanna	Nicolo Zandomenego	Edoardo Alfonsi	Diana Gaspari	IJCC 2019 (silver)
2018–19	Giacomo Colli	Daniele Constantini	Alberto Zisa	Francesco De Zanna	Edoardo Alfonsi		IMCC 2019 (4th)
2019–20	Giacomo Colli	Alberto Zisa	Francesco De Zanna	Simone Piffer	Luca Casagrande	Diana Gaspari	WJCC 2020 (9th)
2020–21	Giacomo Colli	Alberto Zisa	Francesco De Zanna	Edoardo Alfonsi		Diana Gaspari	IMCC 2021 (4th)
2021–22	Giacomo Colli	Francesco De Zanna	Mattia Curtolo	Alberto Cavallero	Edoardo Caproni	Diana Gaspari	IJCC 2022 (gold)
2021–22	Giacomo Colli	Francesco De Zanna	Simone Piffer	Daniele Casagrande	Stefano Gilli	Diana Gaspari, Alessandro Zisa	WJCC 2022 (8th)
2021–22	Giacomo Colli	Alberto Zisa	Francesco De Zanna	Simone Piffer	Edoardo Alfonsi	Diana Gaspari	IMCC 2022 (bronze)
2022–23	Giacomo Colli	Francesco De Zanna	Simone Piffer	Stefano Gilli	Francesco Vigliani	Marco Mariani	WJCC 2023 (5th)
2022–23	Giacomo Colli	Alberto Zisa	Francesco De Zanna	Edoardo Alfonsi	Alberto Cavallero	Diana Gaspari	IMCC 2023 (silver)
2023–24	Francesco De Zanna (Fourth)	Stefano Gilli (Skip)	Andrea Gilli	Francesco Vigliani	Alberto Cavallero	Marco Mariani	WJCC 2024 (silver)
2023–24	Alberto Zisa (Fourth)	Giacomo Colli (Skip)	Francesco De Zanna	Marcello Pachner	Edoardo Alfonsi	Diana Gaspari	IMCC 2024 (silver)
2023–24	Joël Retornaz	Amos Mosaner	Sebastiano Arman	Mattia Giovanella	Francesco De Zanna	Ryan Fry	WCC 2024 (bronze)
2024–25	Alberto Zisa (Fourth)	Giacomo Colli (Skip)	Francesco De Zanna	Marcello Pachner	Edoardo Alfonsi	Diana Gaspari	IMCC 2025 (4th)
2025–26	Alberto Zisa (Fourth)	Giacomo Colli (Skip)	Francesco De Zanna	Fabio Ribotta			
2026–27	Mattia Giovanella (Fourth)	Alberto Zisa (Skip)	Francesco De Zanna	Francesco Vigliani			

=== Mixed ===
Season	Skip	Third	Second	Lead	Coach	Events
2018–19	Marta Lo Deserto	Francesco De Zanna	Anna Maria Maurino	Denis Manfè	Violetta Caldart	EYOWF 2019 (8th)
2019–20	Francesco De Zanna (Fourth)	Federica Ghedina	Simone Piffer	Marta Lo Deserto (Skip)	Chiara Olivieri	WYOG 2020 (5th)

=== Mixed doubles ===
Season	Female	Male	Coach	Events
2018–19	Marta Lo Deserto	Francesco De Zanna		IMDCC 2019 (7th)
2019–20	(United States) Alina Tschumakow	(Italy) Francesco De Zanna	Chiara Olivieri	WYOG 2020 (25th)
2019–20	Giulia Zardini Lacedelli	Francesco De Zanna		IMDCC 2020 (7th)
2022–23	Giulia Zardini Lacedelli	Francesco De Zanna		IMDCC 2023 (silver)
2023–24	Giulia Zardini Lacedelli	Francesco De Zanna		IMDCC 2024 (silver)
2023–24	Stefania Constantini	Francesco De Zanna	Violetta Caldart	WMDCC 2024 (8th)
2024–25	Giulia Zardini Lacedelli	Francesco De Zanna	Wolfgang Burba, Ekaterina Galkina	WUG 2025 (4th)
2024–25	Giulia Zardini Lacedelli	Francesco De Zanna		IMDCC 2025 (silver)
