= Daniele Ferrazza =

Italian curler from Cembra

- Curler
- Born: 16 March 1993 (age 33)

Team
- Skip: Luca Rizzolli
- Fourth: Mattia Giovanella
- Third: Alberto Pimpini
- Second: Daniele Ferrazza

Curling career
- Member Association: Italy
- World Championship: 3 (2015, 2017, 2018)
- European Championship: 6 (2010, 2013, 2014, 2015, 2016, 2017)
- Olympic: 1 (2018)

Daniele Ferrazza (born 16 March 1993 in Trento) is an Italian curler from Cembra. He competed at the 2015 Ford World Men's Curling Championship in Halifax, Nova Scotia, Canada, as second for the Italian team.

== Personal life ==
Ferazza is employed as a carpenter
