= Mattia Giovanella =

Italian curler (born 1997)

- Curler
- Born: 27 October 1997 (age 29); Trento, Italy

Team
- Curling club: Trentino Curling, Cembra, ITA
- Skip: Alberto Zisa
- Fourth: Mattia Giovanella
- Second: Francesco De Zanna
- Lead: Francesco Vigliani

Curling career
- Member Association: Italy
- World Championship: 6 (2021, 2022, 2023, 2024, 2025, 2026)
- European Championship: 5 (2021, 2022, 2023, 2024, 2025)
- Olympic: 2 (2022, 2026)
- Grand Slam victories: 4 (2022 Masters, 2023 Tour Challenge, 2023 National, 2023 Masters)
Medal record
Men's curling
Representing Italy
World Championships
Bronze medal – third place	2022 Las Vegas
Bronze medal – third place	2024 Schaffhausen
European Championships
Bronze medal – third place	2021 Lillehammer
Bronze medal – third place	2022 Östersund

Mattia Giovanella (born 27 October 1997) is an Italian curler from Cembra, Italy. He currently throws fourth stones on Team Alberto Zisa.

== Career ==
Giovanella and his team of Luca Rizzolli, Alessandro Odorizzi, Giovanni Gottardi and Luca Casagrande represented Italy at the 2019 World Junior-B Curling Championships. There, the team made it to the gold medal game, where they lost to New Zealand's Matthew Neilson. Their second-place finish qualified them for the 2019 World Junior Curling Championships in Liverpool, Nova Scotia. At the championship, they finished in last place with a 1–8 round robin record, only beating Sweden's Daniel Berggren.

Giovanella competed as lead for the Italian National Men's Curling Team skipped by Joël Retornaz at the 2021 World Men's Curling Championship as regular lead Simone Gonin failed to pass the COVID-19 regulations to travel outside the country. At the Worlds, Team Italy finished in seventh place with a 7–6 record, just missing the playoffs.

Giovanella would move up from alternate to their full-time lead on Team Retornaz starting during the 2022–23 curling season. With Team Retornaz preparing for the 2026 Winter Olympics, in which it would be hosted by their home country of Italy at Cortina d'Ampezzo, they would start to find more success. Notably, they would win 4 Grand Slam of Curling events (the most ever for an Italian team) at the 2022 Masters, 2023 Tour Challenge, 2023 National, and 2023 Masters. They would also win Italy's first medals at the World Men's Curling Championship, with two bronze medals in 2022 and in 2024.

== Personal life ==
Before becoming a full time curler, Giovanella worked as a stone porphyry maker.

== Teams ==
Season	Skip	Third	Second	Lead	Alternate
2018–19	Luca Rizzoli	Mattia Giovanella	Andrea Pilzer	Nicola Gottardi	
2018–19	Luca Rizzolli	Mattia Giovanella	Alessandro Odorizzi	Giovanni Gottardi	Luca Casagrande
2019–20	Luca Rizzoli	Mattia Giovanella	Andrea Pilzer	Nicola Gottardi	
2020–21	Alberta Pimpini (Fourth)	Mattia Giovanella	Luca Rizzoli (Skip)	Daniele Ferrazza	
2020–21	Joël Retornaz	Amos Mosaner	Sebastiano Arman	Simone Gonin	Mattia Giovanella
2021–22	Mattia Giovanella (Fourth)	Alberta Pimpini	Daniele Ferrazza	Luca Rizzoli (Skip)	
2021–22	Joël Retornaz	Amos Mosaner	Sebastiano Arman	Simone Gonin	Mattia Giovanella
2022–23	Joël Retornaz	Amos Mosaner	Sebastiano Arman	Mattia Giovanella	
2023–24	Joël Retornaz	Amos Mosaner	Sebastiano Arman	Mattia Giovanella	
2024–25	Joël Retornaz	Amos Mosaner	Sebastiano Arman	Mattia Giovanella	
2025–26	Joël Retornaz	Amos Mosaner	Sebastiano Arman	Mattia Giovanella	
2026–27	Mattia Giovanella (Fourth)	Alberto Zisa (Skip)	Francesco De Zanna	Francesco Vigliani	
