= Italian Mixed Doubles Curling Championship =

The Italian Mixed Doubles Curling Championship (Italian: Campionato italiano doppio misto di curling) is the national championship of mixed doubles curling (one man and one woman) in Italy. It has been held annually since the 2007–2008 season. Beginning with the 2019-20 season, the winner of the Italian Mixed Doubles Curling Championship did not automatically qualify for the World Mixed Doubles Championship. The championships are organized by the Italian Ice-Sports Federation (Italian: Federazione Italiana Sport del Ghiaccio, FISG).

== List of champions and medallists ==
Year	Champion		Runner-up		Bronze		Place at Worlds
Year	Woman	Man	Woman	Man	Woman	Man	Place at Worlds
2008	Silvia Mingozzi	Alberto Rostagnotto	?	?	?	?	11
2009	Chiara Zanotelli	Andrea Pilzer	?	?	?	?	16
2010	Lucrezia Laurenti	Marco Pascale	?	?	?	?	6
2011	Giorgia Ricca	Alessio Gonin	?	?	?	?	22
2012	Amanda Bianchi	Maurizio Mainero	?	?	?	?	12
2013	Giorgia Ricca	Alessio Gonin	?	?	?	?	17
2014	Giorgia Ricca	Alessio Gonin	Lucrezia Salvai	Simone Gonin	Emanuela Cavallo	Gabriele Ripa	24
2015	Lucrezia Salvai	Simone Gonin	Lucrezia Laurenti	Marco Pascale	Barbara Gentile	Marco Onnis	9
2016	Lucrezia Laurenti	Marco Pascale	Veronica Zappone	Marco Onnis	Arianna Losano	Simone Gonin	19
2017	Veronica Zappone	Simone Gonin	Emanuela Cavallo	Marco Onnis	Denise Pimpini	Fabio Sola	12
2018	Veronica Zappone	Simone Gonin	Alice Cobelli	Amos Mosaner	Valeria Girardi	Giacomo Colli	12
2019	Alice Cobelli	Amos Mosaner	Angela Romei	Joël Retornaz	Emanuela Cavallo	Lorenzo Maurino	18
2020	Alice Cobelli	Amos Mosaner	Angela Romei	Joël Retornaz	Diana Gaspari	Giacomo Colli	WMDCC cancelled
2021	Roberta Tosel	Fabrizio Gallo	Lucrezia Grande	Andrea Gilli	Giorgia Maurino	Francesco Vigliani	5
2022	Alice Cobelli	Amos Mosaner	Camilla Gilberti	Sebastiano Arman	Elena Dami	Alberto Pimpini	7
2023	Stefania Constantini	Sebastiano Arman	Giulia Zardini Lacedelli	Francesco De Zanna	Alice Cobelli	Amos Mosaner	12
2024	Stefania Constantini	Sebastiano Arman	Giulia Zardini Lacedelli	Francesco De Zanna	Vittoria Maioni	Giacomo Colli	7
2025	Rachele Scalesse	Alberto Pimpini	Giulia Zardini Lacedelli	Francesco De Zanna	Stefania Constantini	Alessandro Zisa	(gold)
2026	Giorgia Maurino	Simone Gonin	Rachele Scalesse	Alberto Pimpini	Giada Zambelli	Francesco De Zanna	4

== Medal record for curlers ==
Curler	Gold	Silver	Bronze
Simone Gonin	4	1	1
Alice Cobelli	3	1	1
Amos Mosaner	3	1	1
Alessio Gonin	3		
Giorgia Ricca	3		
Sebastiano Arman	2	1	
Veronica Zappone	2	1	
Lucrezia Laurenti	2	1	
Marco Pascale	2	1	
Stefania Constantini	2		1
Alberto Pimpini	1	1	1
Lucrezia Salvai	1	1	
Rachele Scalesse	1	1	
Giorgia Maurino	1		1
Amanda Bianchi	1		
Fabrizio Gallo	1		
Maurizio Mainero	1		
Silvia Mingozzi	1		
Andrea Pilzer	1		
Alberto Rostagnotto	1		
Roberta Tosel	1		
Chiara Zanotelli	1		
Francesco De Zanna		3	1
Giulia Zardini Lacedelli		3	
Marco Onnis		2	1
Angela Romei		2	
Joël Retornaz		2	
Emanuela Cavallo		1	2
Camilla Gilberti		1	
Andrea Gilli		1	
Lucrezia Grande		1	
Giacomo Colli			3
Elena Dami			1
Diana Gaspari			1
Barbara Gentile			1
Valeria Girardi			1
Arianna Losano			1
Vittoria Maioni			1
Lorenzo Maurino			1
Denise Pimpini			1
Gabriele Ripa			1
Fabio Sola			1
Francesco Vigliani			1
Giada Zambelli			1
Alessandro Zisa			1

== See also ==
- Italian Men's Curling Championship
- Italian Women's Curling Championship
- Italian Mixed Curling Championship
