= Italian Mixed Curling Championship =

The Italian Mixed Curling Championship (Italian: Campionato italiano misto di curling) is the national championship of mixed curling (two men and two women) in Italy. It has been held annually since 2002 (not held in 2003, 2004) and organized by the Italian Ice-Sports Federation (Italian: Federazione Italiana Sport del Ghiaccio, FISG).

In mixed curling, the positions on a team must alternate between men and women. If a man throws last rocks, which is usually the case, the women must throw lead rocks and third rocks, while the other male member of the team throws second rocks.

== List of champions and medallists ==
The past champions and medalists of the event are listed as follows (in order - fourth/skip, third, second, lead, alternate; skips marked bold):

Year	Champion (curling club, line-up)	Runner-up	Bronze	Place at Euro (before 2015) or Worlds (since 2015) next season
2002	CC New Wave; Diana Gaspari, Adriano Lorenzi, Arianna Lorenzi, Giorgio Alberti, alternate: Basilio De Zanna			—
2003	not held			
2004	not held			
2005	CC Tofane			7th
2006	CC Tre Cime			2006 (silver)
2007	CC Tofane			11th
2008	CC Tofane			9th
2009	SUM Draghi			18th
2010	CC Tofane			21st
2011	CC 66 Cortina			6th
2012	CC Dolomiti			16th
2013	CC Tofane			13th
2014	Sporting Club Pinerolo; Simone Gonin, Lucrezia Salvai, Alessio Gonin, Emanuela Cavallo, alternates: Giorgia Ricca, Fabio Cavallo	C.C. 66 Cortina; Valter Bombassei De Bona, Chiara Olivieri, Marco Constantini, Orietta Zanotelli	Tofane; Diana Gaspari, Malko Tondella, Sonia Dibona, Marcello Pachner	9th
2015	Team Draghi; Fabio Sola, Denise Pimpini, Alberto Pimpini, Sara Aliberti, alternates: Emanuela Matino, Stefano Perucca	Sporting Club Pinerolo; Simone Gonin, Lucrezia Salvai, Alessio Gonin, Lucilla Macchiati, alternate: Fabio Cavallo	Sporting Club Pinerolo 2 Marco Onnis, Barbara Gentile, Gabriele Ripa Buschetti Di Meana, Alice Gaudenzi	9th
2016	Team Draghi; Denise Pimpini, Fabio Sola, Emanuela Matino, Giovanni Battoni, alternate: Sara Aliberti	Sporting Club Pinerolo; Simone Gonin, Lucilla Macchiati, Alessio Gonin, Cristina Durando, alternate: Marco Onnis, coach: Emanuela Cavallo	Tofane; Diana Gaspari, Malko Tondella, Chiara Zanotelli, Marcello Pachner, alternate: Guido Fassina	9th
2017	Sporting Club Pinerolo; Alessio Gonin, Emanuela Cavallo, Fabio Cavallo, Martina Bronsino, alternate: Lucilla Macchiati, coach: Lucilla Macchiati	Virtus Piemonte Ghiaccio 1 Marco Pascale, Lucrezia Laurenti, Stefano Perucca, Amanda Bianchi, coach: Gianandrea Gallinatto	Draghi-Fireblock Mixed; Fabio Sola, Fiona Grace Simpson, Graziano Iacovetti, Emanuela Matino, alternates: Sara Aliberti, Simone Sola	—
2018	Sporting Club Pinerolo; Lorenzo Maurino, Emanuela Cavallo, Davide Forchino, Arianna Losano, alternate: Giovanni Tosel, coach: Simone Gonin	Fireblock Mixed; Fabio Sola, Denise Pimpini, Simone Sola, Emanuela Matino, alternates: Sara Aliberti, Julien Michele Genre	Virtus Piemonte Ghiaccio 1 Eugenio Molinatti, Lucrezia Salvai, Stefano Perucca, Amanda Bianchi, coach: Gianandrea Gallinatto	18th
2019	Team Virtus Mixed; Alberto Pimpini, Barbara Gentile, Stefano Perucca, Amanda Bianchi, alternates: Giulia Mingozzi, Eugenio Molinatti, coach: Gianandrea Gallinatto	Magica Fireblock; Fabio Sola, Denise Pimpini, Julien Michele Genre, Emanuela Matino, alternates: Sara Aliberti, Simone Sola	Sporting Club Pinerolo; Veronica Zappone, Lorenzo Maurino, Emanuela Cavallo, Davide Forchino, alternates: Fabio Ribotta, Anna Maria Maurino	19th
2020	Fireblock Mixed; Fabio Sola, Denise Pimpini, Julien Michele Genre, Emanuela Matino	Sporting Club Pinerolo; Veronica Zappone, Giovanni Tosel, Anna Maria Maurino, Davide Forchino, alternates: Arianna Losano, Lorenzo Messina	Virtus Piemonte Mixed; Alberto Pimpini, Elena Dami, Marco Onnis, Lucrezia Laurenti, alternate: Stefano Perucca	—

== See also ==
- Italian Men's Curling Championship
- Italian Women's Curling Championship
- Italian Mixed Doubles Curling Championship
