= Giorgia Ricca =

Italian curler

- Curler ♀

Team
- Curling club: Sporting Club Pinerolo, Pinerolo, ITA
- Mixed doubles partner: Alessio Gonin

Curling career
- Member Association: Italy
- World Mixed Doubles Championship: 3 (2011, 2013, 2014)
Medal record
Italian Mixed Doubles Championship
Gold medal – first place	2011
Gold medal – first place	2013
Gold medal – first place	2014

Giorgia Ricca is an Italian curler.

At the national level, she is a three-time Italian mixed doubles champion curler (2011, 2013, 2014).

== Teams and events ==
=== Women's ===
Season	Skip	Third	Second	Lead	Events
2013–14	Emanuela Cavallo	Giorgia Ricca	Alice Gaudenzi	Giulia Mingozzi	IJCC 2014 (silver)

=== Mixed ===
Season	Skip	Third	Second	Lead	Alternate	Events
2013–14	Simone Gonin	Lucrezia Salvai	Alessio Gonin	Emanuela Cavallo	Giorgia Ricca, Fabio Cavallo	IMxCC 2014 (gold)

=== Mixed doubles ===
Season	Female	Male	Coach	Events
2010–11	Giorgia Ricca	Alessio Gonin	Gianandrea Gallinatto (WMDCC)	IMDCC 2011 (gold); WMDCC 2011 (22nd)
2012–13	Giorgia Ricca	Alessio Gonin		IMDCC 2013 (gold); WMDCC 2013 (17th)
2013–14	Giorgia Ricca	Alessio Gonin		IMDCC 2014 (gold); WMDCC 2014 (24th)
