= Alessio Gonin =

Italian curler

- Curler ♂

Team
- Curling club: Sporting Club Pinerolo, Pinerolo, ITA
- Mixed doubles partner: Giorgia Ricca

Curling career
- Member Association: Italy
- World Mixed Doubles Championship: 3 (2011, 2013, 2014)
- Other appearances: European Mixed Championship: 1 (2014)
Medal record
Italian Men's Championship
Silver medal – second place	2017
Italian Mixed Doubles Championship
Gold medal – first place	2011
Gold medal – first place	2013
Gold medal – first place	2014
Italian Mixed Championship
Gold medal – first place	2014
Gold medal – first place	2017
Silver medal – second place	2015
Silver medal – second place	2016

Alessio Gonin is an Italian curler.

At the national level, he is a three-time Italian mixed doubles champion curler (2011, 2013, 2014) and two-time Italian mixed champion curler (2014, 2017).

Out of curling, he is a professional photographer.

== Teams and events ==
=== Men's ===
Season	Skip	Third	Second	Lead	Alternate	Coach	Events
2013–14	Simone Gonin	Alessio Gonin	Luca Pinnacolo	Fabio Cavallo	Gabriele Ripa Di Maena		
2013–14	Marco Onnis	Gabriele Ripa Buschetti Di Meana	Alessio Gonin	Fabio Cavallo			IJCC 2014 (bronze)
2016–17	Simone Gonin	Fabio Ribotta	Alessio Gonin	Lorenzo Maurino	Fabio Cavallo	Lucilla Macchiati	IMCC 2017 (silver)

=== Mixed ===
Season	Skip	Third	Second	Lead	Alternate	Coach	Events
2013–14	Simone Gonin	Lucrezia Salvai	Alessio Gonin	Emanuela Cavallo	Giorgia Ricca, Fabio Cavallo		IMxCC 2014 (gold)
2014–15	Simone Gonin	Lucrezia Salvai	Alessio Gonin	Emanuela Cavallo		Fabio Cavallo	EMxCC 2014 (9th)
2014–15	Simone Gonin	Lucrezia Salvai	Alessio Gonin	Lucilla Macchiati	Fabio Cavallo		IMxCC 2015 (silver)
2015–16	Simone Gonin (fourth)	Lucilla Macchiati (skip)	Alessio Gonin	Cristina Durando	Marco Onnis	Emanuela Cavallo	IMxCC 2016 (silver)
2016–17	Alessio Gonin	Emanuela Cavallo	Fabio Cavallo	Martina Bronsino	Lucilla Macchiati	Lucilla Macchiati	IMxCC 2017 (gold)
2018–19	Marco Onnis	Barbara Gentile	Gioele De Luca	Giulia Mingozzi	Alessio Gonin, Alice Gaudenzi		IMxCC 2018 (4th)

=== Mixed doubles ===
Season	Female	Male	Coach	Events
2010–11	Giorgia Ricca	Alessio Gonin	Gianandrea Gallinatto (WMDCC)	IMDCC 2011 (gold); WMDCC 2011 (22nd)
2012–13	Giorgia Ricca	Alessio Gonin		IMDCC 2013 (gold); WMDCC 2013 (17th)
2013–14	Giorgia Ricca	Alessio Gonin		IMDCC 2014 (gold); WMDCC 2014 (24th)
