= 2020 Italian Mixed Doubles Curling Championship =

- Host city: Cembra (playoffs)
- Dates: October 28, 2019 – January 26, 2020
- Winner: Amos Mosaner / Alice Cobelli
- Finalist: Joël Retornaz / Angela Romei

The 2020 Italian Mixed Doubles Curling Championship (Italian: Campionati Mixed Doubles - Anno Sportivo 2019-2020) was held from October 28, 2019 to January 26, 2020 in two stages: the group stage (round robin) from October 28, 2019 to January 17, 2020 and the playoff stage from January 24 to 26, 2020.

21 teams took part in the championship, with the 8 best teams promoted to the playoff stage.

The winners of the championship were the Amos Mosaner / Alice Cobelli team, who beat the Joël Retornaz / Angela Romei team in the final. The bronze medal was won by the Giacomo Colli / Diana Gaspari team, who won the bronze match against the Mattia Giovanella / Chiara Zanotelli team.

Team Amos Mosaner / Alice Cobelli represented Italy at the 2020 World Mixed Doubles Curling Championship.

== Teams ==
Team	Man	Woman	Locale
Arienti / Merlo	Alberto Arienti	Greta Merlo	A.s.d. Jass Curling Club
Bergamaschi / Rizzi	Vasco Antonio Bergamaschi	Micaela Maria Rizzi	A.s.d. Jass Curling Club
Bianchi / Erba	Andrea Maria Bianchi	Martina Erba	A.s.d. Jass Curling Club
Casagrande / Gilberti	Luca Casagrande	Camilla Gilberti	A.S.D. Associazione Curling Cembra
Colli / Gaspari	Giacomo Colli	Diana Gaspari	Curling Club 66 Cortina Associazione sportiva dilettantistica
De Zanna / Lo Deserto	Basilio De Zanna	Marta Lo Deserto	Curling Club Dolomiti
De Zanna / Zardini Lacedelli	Francesco De Zanna	Giulia Zardini Lacedelli	Curling Club 66 Cortina Associazione sportiva dilettantistica
Fassina / Apollonio	Guido Fassina	Federica Apollonio	Curling Club Tofane A.s.d.
Gallo / Marten	Fabrizio Gallo	Elisa Marten Perolino	Draghi Curling Club Torino A.s.d.
Giorgetti / Buitta	Alessandro Giorgetti	Valentina Buitta	A.s.d. Jass Curling Club
Giovanella / Zanotelli C.	Mattia Giovanella	Chiara Zanotelli	Curling Club Lago Santo A.s.d.
Gonin / Zappone	Simone Gonin	Veronica Zappone	3 S Libertas Luserna
Margheritis / Bennigartner	Simone Margheritis	Donatella Bennigartner	A.s.d. Jass Curling Club
Masotti / Diletti	Valentino Giuseppe Masotti	Claudia Diletti	A.s.d. Jass Curling Club
Maurino / Maurino	Lorenzo Maurino	Anna Maria Maurino	A.s.d. I Pinguini
Mosaner A. / Cobelli	Amos Mosaner	Alice Cobelli	A.S.D. Associazione Curling Cembra
Mosaner C. / Zanotelli O.	Carlo Mosaner	Orietta Zanotelli	Curling Club Lago Santo A.s.d.
Olivieri / Constantini	? (DNS)	?	Curling Club 66 Cortina Associazione sportiva dilettantistica
Piffer / Callegari	? (DNS)	?	A.S.D. Associazione Curling Cembra
Retornaz / Romei	Joël Retornaz	Angela Romei	A.s.d. Sporting Club Pinerolo
Rizzolli / Holler	Luca Rizzolli	Valentina Holler	Curling Club Cembra 88 A.s.d.

== Round robin ==
Key
Teams to Playoffs

=== Group A ===
(Qualificazione - Girone Pinerolo)
Was held in Pinerolo from October 28 to December 27, 2019

	Team	A1	A2	A3	A4	Wins	Losses	DSC, cm	Place
A1	Gallo / Marten	*	4:6; 1:9	5:8; 3:11	3:12; 3:10	0	6	115.2	4
A2	Gonin / Zappone	6:4; 9:1	*	11:7; 2:6	4:6; 4:8	3	3	36.5	3
A3	Maurino / Maurino	8:5; 11:3	7:11; 6:2	*	9:2; 5:8	4	2	72.9	2
A4	Retornaz / Romei	12:3; 10:3	6:4; 8:4	2:9; 8:5	*	5	1	32.6	1

=== Group B ===
(Qualificazione - Girone Cembra)
Was held in Cembra from November 29 to December 15, 2019

	Team	B1	B2	B3	B4	B5	B6	Wins	Losses	DSC, cm	Place
B1	Casagrande / Gilberti	*	5:6; 4:7	7:13; 5:9	9:10; 3:9		7:4; 7:6	2	6	53.4	4
B2	Giovanella / Zanotelli C.	6:5; 7:4	*	4:7; 2:5	9:7; 8:2		9:5; 8:4	6	2	52.1	2
B3	Mosaner A. / Cobelli	13:7; 9:5	7:4; 5:2	*	6:3; 12:1		9:3; 9:4	8	0	64.0	1
B4	Mosaner C. / Zanotelli O.	10:9; 9:3	7:9; 2:8	3:6; 1:12	*		8:6	4	4	71.9	3
B5	Piffer / Callegari	..				*					DNS
B6	Rizzolli / Holler	4:7; 6:7	5:9; 4:8	3:9; 4:9	6:8		*	0	8	63.5	5

=== Group C ===
(Qualificazione - Girone Cortina)
Was held in Cortina d'Ampezzo from November 13, 2019 to January 17, 2020

	Team	C1	C2	C3	C4	C5	Wins	Losses	DSC, cm	Place
C1	Colli / Gaspari	*	10:5	11:3; 8:3	13:0; 2:0		5	0	83.2	1
C2	De Zanna / Lo Deserto	5:10.	*	5:6	8:1		1	2	131.8	3
C3	De Zanna / Zardini Lacedelli	3:11; 3:8	6:5	*	8:5		2	2	116.4	2
C4	Fassina / Apollonio	0:13; 0:2	1:8	5:8	*		0	4	137.7	4
C5	Olivieri / Constantini	..				*				DNS

=== Group D ===
(Qualificazione - Girone Sesto S. Giovanni)
Was held in Pinerolo from November 30 to December 1, 2019

	Team	D1	D2	D3	D4	D5	D6	Wins	Losses	DSC, cm	Place
D1	Arienti / Merlo	*	8:6	8:4	6:8	4:9	9:3	3	2	149.0	3
D2	Bergamaschi / Rizzi	6:8	*	3:7	5:9	5:9	6:3	1	4	172.4	5
D3	Bianchi / Erba	4:8	7:3	*	7:5	6:7	8:7	3	2	181.6	4
D4	Giorgetti / Buitta	8:6	9:5	5:7	*	5:6	7:6	3	2	139.5	2
D5	Margheritis / Bennigartner	9:4	9:5	7:6	6:5	*	11:2	5	0	141.3	1
D6	Masotti / Diletti	3:9	3:6	7:8	6:7	2:11	*	0	5	142.2	6

== Playoffs ==
(Finale)
Was held as "double knockout" in Cembra from January 24 to 26, 2020

=== Stage 1 ===
Game 1
Retornaz / Romei	17
Giorgetti / Buitta	1
Colli / Gaspari	5
Giovanella / Zanotelli C.	8
Mosaner A. / Cobelli	8
Maurino / Maurino	6
Margheritis / Bennigartner	9
De Zanna / Zardini Lacedelli	8

Game 2
Retornaz / Romei	8
Giovanella / Zanotelli C.	1
Mosaner A. / Cobelli	14
Margheritis / Bennigartner	2

Game 3 (winner to final)
Retornaz / Romei	7
Mosaner A. / Cobelli	5

=== Stage 2 ===
Game 4
Colli / Gaspari	14
Giorgetti / Buitta	4
Maurino / Maurino	11
De Zanna / Zardini Lacedelli	2

Game 5
Colli / Gaspari	13
Margheritis / Bennigartner	5
Giovanella / Zanotelli C.	8
Maurino / Maurino	6

Game 6 (loser to bronze match)
Colli / Gaspari	6
Giovanella / Zanotelli C.	8

Game 7 (winner to final; loser to bronze match)
Giovanella / Zanotelli C.	4
Mosaner A. / Cobelli	7

=== Bronze-medal match ===
January 26, 15:30

Sheet 2	1	2	3	4	5	6	7	8	Final
Colli / Gaspari	1	0	1	1	0	2	2	X	7
Giovanella / Zanotelli C.	0	1	0	0	2	0	0	X	3

=== Final ===
January 26, 15:30

Sheet 1	1	2	3	4	5	6	7	8	Final
Mosaner A. / Cobelli	0	1	0	2	2	0	0	1	6
Retornaz / Romei	2	0	1	0	0	1	1	0	5

== Final standings ==
Place	Team	Woman	Man	Games	Wins	Losses	DSC, cm
1st place, gold medalist(s)	Mosaner A. / Cobelli	Amos Mosaner	Alice Cobelli	13	12	1	
2nd place, silver medalist(s)	Retornaz / Romei	Joël Retornaz	Angela Romei	10	8	2	
3rd place, bronze medalist(s)	Colli / Gaspari	Giacomo Colli	Diana Gaspari	10	8	2	
4	Giovanella / Zanotelli C.	Mattia Giovanella	Chiara Zanotelli	14	9	5	
5	Margheritis / Bennigartner	Simone Margheritis	Donatella Bennigartner	8	6	2	
5	Maurino / Maurino	Lorenzo Maurino	Anna Maria Maurino	9	5	4	
7	Giorgetti / Buitta	Alessandro Giorgetti	Valentina Buitta	7	3	4	
7	De Zanna / Zardini Lacedelli	Francesco De Zanna	Giulia Zardini Lacedelli	6	2	4	
9	Gonin / Zappone	Simone Gonin	Veronica Zappone	6	3	3	36.5
9	Mosaner C. / Zanotelli O.	Carlo Mosaner	Orietta Zanotelli	8	4	4	71.9
9	De Zanna / Lo Deserto	Basilio De Zanna	Marta Lo Deserto	3	1	2	131.8
9	Arienti / Merlo	Alberto Arienti	Greta Merlo	5	3	2	149.0
13	Gallo / Marten	Fabrizio Gallo	Elisa Marten Perolino	6	0	6	115.2
13	Casagrande / Gilberti	Luca Casagrande	Camilla Gilberti	8	2	6	53.4
13	Fassina / Apollonio	Guido Fassina	Federica Apollonio	4	0	4	137.7
13	Bianchi / Erba	Andrea Maria Bianchi	Martina Erba	5	3	2	181.6
17	Rizzolli / Holler	Luca Rizzolli	Valentina Holler	8	0	8	63.5
17	Bergamaschi / Rizzi	Vasco Antonio Bergamaschi	Micaela Maria Rizzi	5	1	4	172.4
19	Masotti / Diletti	Valentino Giuseppe Masotti	Claudia Diletti	5	0	5	142.2
20	Piffer / Callegari			(DNS)			
20	Olivieri / Constantini			(DNS)			

== See also ==
- 2020 Italian Men's Curling Championship
- 2020 Italian Women's Curling Championship
- 2020 Italian Mixed Curling Championship
- 2020 Italian Junior Curling Championships
