= Pimpini =

Pimpini is a surname. Notable people with the surname include:

- Alberto Pimpini (born 1997), Italian curler
- Denise Pimpini (born 1995), Italian curler
