= Michelle Gribi =

Swiss curler

- Curler ♀
- Born: 29 September 1992 (age 34)

Team
- Mixed doubles partner: Reto Gribi

Curling career
- Member Association: Switzerland
- World Mixed Doubles Championship: 1 (2014)
- Other appearances: World Junior Championships: 1 (2013), Winter Universiade: (2015)
Medal record
Curling
World Mixed Doubles Championship
Gold medal – first place	2014 Dumfries
Winter Universiade
Bronze medal – third place	2015 Granada
Swiss Women's Championship
Gold medal – first place	2018 Flims

Michelle Gribi (born 29 September 1992) is a Swiss curler. She is a 2014 World mixed doubles champion.

== Teams ==
=== Women's ===
Season	Skip	Third	Second	Lead	Alternate	Coach	Events
2010–11	Melanie Barbezat	Mara Gautschi	Michelle Gribi	Vera Camponovo			
2012–13	Michelle Gribi	Lisa Gisler	Chantal Bugnon	Vera Camponovo	Jenny Perret (WJCC)	Urs Dick	SJCC 2013 (gold); WJCC 2013 (8th)
2013–14	Michelle Gribi	Lisa Gisler	Chantal Bugnon	Vera Camponovo		Urs Dick	SJCC 2014 (bronze)
2014–15	Michèle Jäggi	Michelle Gribi	Stéphanie Jäggi	Vera Camponovo	Carine Mattille	Joan McCusker	SWCC 2015 (4th)
2015	Michèle Jäggi	Michelle Gribi	Sina Wettstein	Nora Baumann	Janine Wyss	Anita Jäggi	WUG 2015 (bronze)
2015–16	Michèle Jäggi	Michelle Gribi	Stéphanie Jäggi	Carine Mattille	Vera Camponovo		
2016–17	Michelle Gribi (fourth)	Isabelle Maillard (skip)	Andrea Marx	Fabienne Furbringer			
2017–18	Binia Feltscher	Irene Schori	Franziska Kaufmann	Carole Howald	Michelle Gribi	Allan Moore	SWCC 2018 (gold)

=== Mixed ===
Season	Skip	Third	Second	Lead	Alternate	Events
2016–17	Reto Gribi	Michelle Gribi	Simon Biedermann	Adonia Brunner		SMxCC 2017 (4th)
2017–18	Reto Gribi (fourth)	Michelle Gribi	Simon Biedermann	Adonia Brunner (skip)	Jenny Perret	SMxCC 2018 (bronze)
2018–19	Mike Reid	Aline Fellmann	Matthias Perret	Michelle Gribi	Vera Reid-Heuer	SMxCC 2019 (bronze)

=== Mixed doubles ===
Season	Male	Female	Coach	Events
2013–14	Reto Gribi	Michelle Gribi	Allan Moore	SMDCC 2014 (gold); WMDCC 2014 (gold)
2014–15	Reto Gribi	Michelle Gribi		SMDCC 2015 (4th)
2015–16	Reto Gribi	Michelle Gribi		SMDCC 2016 (9th)
2016–17	Reto Gribi	Michelle Gribi	Brigitte Brunner	SMDCC 2017 (silver)
2017–18	Reto Gribi	Michelle Gribi		SMDCC 2018 (silver)
2018–19	Paddy Käser	Michelle Gribi	Brigitte Brunner-Leutenegger	SMDCC 2019 (silver)

== Personal life ==
Her brother Reto is also a curler and Michelle's mixed doubles teammate. They won the 2014 World Mixed Doubles Championship together.
