= Alice Cobelli =

Italian curler

- Curler ♀
- Born: 19 August 1997 (age 29); Trento, Trentino-Alto Adige/Südtirol, Italy

Team
- Curling club: CC Lago Santo, Cembra

Curling career
- Member Association: Italy
- World Mixed Doubles Championship: 1 (2019)
Medal record
Curling
Italian Women's Championship
Bronze medal – third place	2017 Pinerolo

Alice Cobelli (born 19 August 1997 in Trento, Trentino-Alto Adige/Südtirol, Italy) is an Italian curler.

At the national level, she is a two-time Italian mixed doubles champion (2019, 2020).

== Teams ==
=== Women's ===
Season	Skip	Third	Second	Lead	Alternate	Events
2016–17	Diana Gaspari	Manuela Serafini	Rosa Pompanin	Alice Cobelli	Giada Mosaner	IWCC 2017 (bronze)

=== Mixed doubles ===
Season	Male	Female	Coach	Events
2017–18	Amos Mosaner	Alice Cobelli		IMDCC 2018 (silver)
2018–19	Amos Mosaner	Alice Cobelli	Sören Grahn	IMDCC 2019 (gold); WMDCC 2019 (18th)
2019–20	Amos Mosaner	Alice Cobelli		IMDCC 2020 (gold)
2020–21	Amos Mosaner	Alice Cobelli		

== Personal life ==
She is in a relationship with fellow curler Amos Mosaner.
