= Amos Mosaner =

Italian curler (born 1995)

- Curler
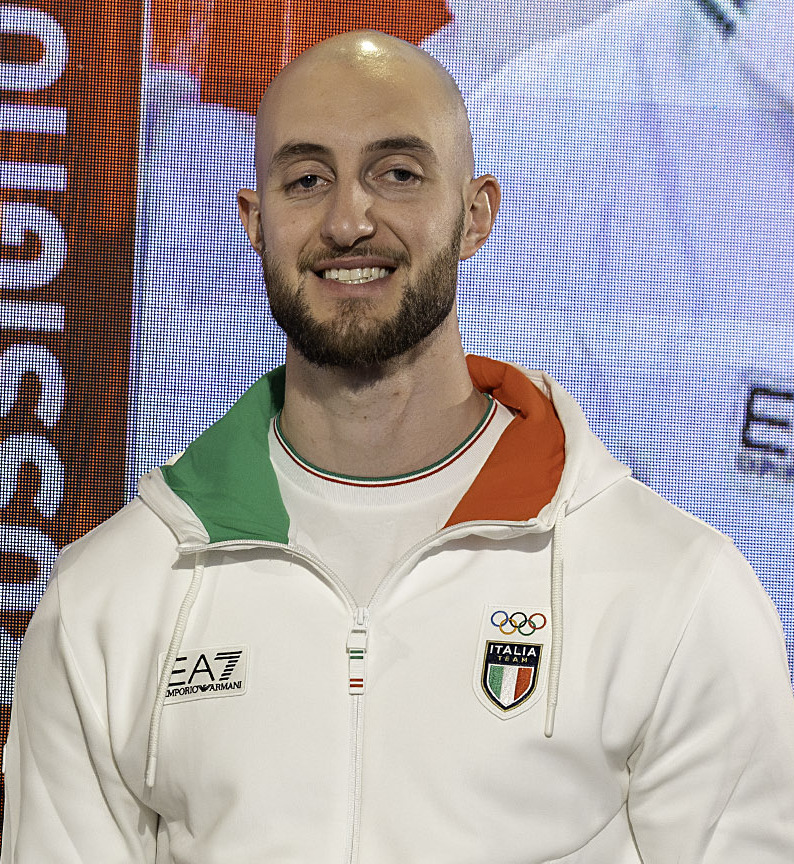
- Mosaner at the 2026 Winter Olympics
- Born: 12 March 1995 (age 31); Trento, Trentino, Italy

Team
- Curling club: Trentino Curling, Cembra
- Skip: Stefano Spiller
- Third: Amos Mosaner
- Second: Sebastiano Arman
- Lead: Cesare Spiller
- Mixed doubles partner: Stefania Constantini

Curling career
- Member Association: Italy
- World Championship: 10 (2015, 2017, 2018, 2019, 2021, 2022, 2023, 2024, 2025, 2026)
- World Mixed Doubles Championship: 4 (2019, 2021, 2025, 2026)
- European Championship: 13 (2013, 2014, 2015, 2016, 2017, 2018, 2019, 2021, 2022, 2023, 2024, 2025, 2026)
- Olympic: 3 (2018, 2022, 2026)
- Grand Slam victories: 4 (2022 Masters, 2023 Tour Challenge, 2023 National, 2023 Masters)
Medal record
Men's curling
Representing Italy
Olympic Games
Gold medal – first place	2022 Beijing	Mixed doubles
Bronze medal – third place	2026 Milano Cortina	Mixed doubles
World Championships
Bronze medal – third place	2022 Las Vegas
Bronze medal – third place	2024 Schaffhausen
World Mixed Doubles Championship
Gold medal – first place	2025 Fredericton
European Championships
Silver medal – second place	2026 Ostrava
Bronze medal – third place	2018 Tallinn
Bronze medal – third place	2021 Lillehammer
Bronze medal – third place	2022 Östersund
Winter Youth Olympics
Silver medal – second place	2012 Innsbruck	Mixed team

Amos Mosaner (Pronunciation [ˈaːmoʃ moˈʒaːner]; Standard Italian pronunciation [ˈaːmos moˈzaːner]; born 12 March 1995) is an Italian curler from Cembra. He is an Olympic gold medallist, having won the mixed doubles event at the 2022 Winter Olympics with partner Stefania Constantini. Mosaner was also the Italian flagbearer for the Opening Ceremonies in Italy at the 2026 Winter Olympics in Cortina d'Ampezzo.

== Career ==
=== Juniors ===
As a junior curler, Mosaner represented Italy in four World Junior Curling Championships. He played third for Italy at the 2012 World Junior Curling Championships on a team skipped by Andrea Pilzer. The team finished 9th. Mosaner then became skip of the Italian junior team for the next three World Juniors. At the 2013 World Junior Curling Championships, Mosaner led his team of Pilzer, Daniele Ferrazza, and Roberto Arman to a 6th-place finish (5-4 record). At the 2014 World Junior Curling Championships, he led his team of Sebastiano Arman, Ferrazza, and Roberto Arman to a 5th-place finish, losing in a tie-breaker to Switzerland. Finally, at the 2015 World Junior Curling Championships, he was less successful, leading his team of Sebastiano Arman, Carlo Gottardi and Fabio Ribotta to an 8th-place finish (3-6).

While Mosaner played in four World Juniors, the highlight of his junior career came at the 2012 Winter Youth Olympics, where he skipped Italy to a silver medal finish. After a 4-3 round robin record, he led his team of Denise Pimpini, Alessandro Zoppi, and Adriana Losano to playoff wins against the United States and Canada before losing to Switzerland in the final. During his junior career, Mosaner and his junior team were named the Italian men's team at the 2013 European Curling Championships. He led his teammates of Pilzer, Ferrazza, and Roberto Arman to a 12th-place finish. While Mosaner was still in juniors, he would skip the men's team and return to the 2014 European Curling Championships. After finishing the round robin in 2nd place with a 7-2 record, they lost all of their playoff games, including the bronze medal match, settling for 4th. However, this placement qualified Italy to play in the 2015 Ford World Men's Curling Championship. The team would add veteran Joel Retornaz to skip the team for the Worlds, with Mosaner throwing last rocks. There, the team finished 10th.

=== Men's ===
The following season, the team finished 8th at the 2015 European Curling Championships, failing to qualify the country for the Worlds. For the 2016-17 season, Mosaner moved to the third position on the team. They finished 7th at the 2016 European Curling Championships and qualified for the 2017 World Men's Curling Championship. Mosaner resumed his position, throwing fourth rocks on the team, which finished 9th overall. The team finished 8th at the 2017 European Curling Championships but had much more success a month later at the 2018 Winter Olympic Qualification Event. The team won the event, qualifying Italy for the 2018 Winter Olympics, where they finished 9th. They finished the season finishing 8th at the 2018 World Men's Curling Championship.

Mosaner and Team Retornaz represented Italy again at the 2018 European Curling Championships, where the country won its first medal at the event since 1979, picking up a bronze. That would qualify them for the 2019 World Men's Curling Championship, where they finished in 7th place. After the 2020 World Men's Curling Championship was canceled due to the pandemic, Team Retornaz represented Italy at the 2021 World Men's Curling Championship in Calgary, Alberta where they finished with a 7–6 record, just missing the playoffs. However, this result would qualify them to represent Italy again at the Olympics in 2022. Coming off his gold medal performance in mixed doubles, Mosaner and Team Retornaz would finish in 9th place with a 3-6 round robin record.

With Team Retornaz preparing for the 2026 Winter Olympics, in which it would be hosted by their home country of Italy at Cortina d'Ampezzo, they would start to find more success. Notably, they would win 4 Grand Slam of Curling events (the most ever for an Italian team) at the 2022 Masters, 2023 Tour Challenge, 2023 National, and 2023 Masters. They would also win Italy's first medals at the World Men's Curling Championship, with two bronze medals in 2022 and in 2024.

=== Mixed doubles ===
Mosaner began playing mixed doubles with Alice Cobelli, and the duo, after winning the 2019 Italian Mixed Doubles Curling Championship, competed in the 2019 World Mixed Doubles Curling Championship. The pair finished the round robin with a 5-2 record, in third place in their group. However, the pair missed out on the playoffs as their draw shot challenge (DSC) record was not good enough compared to the other third-place teams. In January 2020, Mosaner and Cobelli won 2020 Italian Mixed Doubles Curling Championship and was supposed to represent Italy on 2020 World Mixed Doubles Curling Championship before the event was canceled due to the COVID-19 pandemic.

Mosaner played in the 2022 Winter Olympics in mixed doubles alongside Stefania Constantini. At the Olympics, the team went undefeated, beating Norway's Kristin Skaslien and Magnus Nedregotten 8-5 in the gold medal game, winning Italy's first olympic curling medal.

Mosaner returned to mixed doubles with Constantini at the 2025 World Mixed Doubles Curling Championship, the team would again go undefeated to win the World Championship, beating Scotland's Jennifer Dodds and Bruce Mouat 9-4 in the gold medal game.

== Personal life ==
In 2015, Mosaner was employed as a farmer. He is now a full-time curler. He is in a relationship with fellow curler Alice Cobelli.
