= Reto Gribi =

Swiss curler

- Curler ♂
- Born: 5 February 1991 (age 35)

Team
- Mixed doubles partner: Michelle Gribi

Curling career
- Member Association: Switzerland
- World Mixed Doubles Championship: 1 (2014)
- European Championship: 1 (2016)
Medal record
Curling
World Mixed Doubles Championship
Gold medal – first place	2014 Dumfries
European Championships
Bronze medal – third place	2016 Renfrewshire
Swiss Men's Championship
Bronze medal – third place	2019 Thun

Reto Gribi (born 5 February 1991) is a Swiss curler. He is a 2014 World mixed doubles champion and a 2016 European bronze medallist.

== Teams ==
=== Men's ===
Season	Skip	Third	Second	Lead	Alternate	Coach	Events
2012–13	Reto Gribi	Urs Zahnd	Matthias Perret	Andreas Schorer			
2013–14	Reto Gribi (fourth)	Mike Wenger (skip)	Matthias Perret	Kevin Wunderlin			
2014–15	Reto Gribi (fourth)	Mike Wenger	Matthias Perret	Kevin Wunderlin (skip)			SMCC 2015 (5th)
2015–16	Reto Gribi (fourth)	Mike Wenger	Matthias Perret	Kevin Wunderlin (skip)			SMCC 2016 (6th)
2016–17	Benoît Schwarz (fourth)	Claudio Pätz	Peter de Cruz (skip)	Valentin Tanner	Reto Gribi	Claudio Pescia	ECC 2016 (bronze)
2016–17	Reto Gribi (fourth)	Mike Wenger	Matthias Perret	Kevin Wunderlin (skip)			
2016–17	Reto Keller (fourth)	Yannick Schwaller (skip)	Romano Meier	Marcel Käufeler	Reto Gribi	Pius Matter, Bernhard Werthemann	SMCC 2017 (4th)
2018–19	Marc Pfister	Matthias Perret	Chahan Karnusian	Kevin Wunderlin	Reto Gribi	Raphael Märki	SMCC 2019 (bronze)

=== Mixed ===
Season	Skip	Third	Second	Lead	Alternate	Events
2014–15	Reto Gribi (fourth)	Ursi Hegner (skip)	Matthias Perret	Nina Ledergerber		SMxCC 2015 (9th)
2016–17	Reto Gribi	Michelle Gribi	Simon Biedermann	Adonia Brunner		SMxCC 2017 (4th)
2017–18	Reto Gribi (fourth)	Michelle Gribi	Simon Biedermann	Adonia Brunner (skip)	Jenny Perret	SMxCC 2018 (bronze)
2018–19	Marina Hauser	Marc Pfister	Jessica Jäggi	Reto Gribi		SMxCC 2019 (5th)

=== Mixed doubles ===
Season	Male	Female	Coach	Events
2013–14	Reto Gribi	Michelle Gribi	Allan Moore	SMDCC 2014 (gold); WMDCC 2014 (gold)
2014–15	Reto Gribi	Michelle Gribi		SMDCC 2015 (4th)
2015–16	Reto Gribi	Michelle Gribi		SMDCC 2016 (9th)
2016–17	Reto Gribi	Michelle Gribi	Brigitte Brunner	SMDCC 2017 (silver)
2017–18	Reto Gribi	Michelle Gribi		SMDCC 2018 (silver)

== Personal life ==
His sister Michelle is also a curler and Reto's mixed doubles teammate. They won the 2014 World Mixed Doubles Championship together.
