= 2013 World Mixed Doubles Curling Championship =

- Host city: Fredericton, New Brunswick
- Arena: Grant-Harvey Centre
- Dates: April 13–20, 2013
- Winner: Hungary
- Female: Dorottya Palancsa
- Male: Zsolt Kiss
- Coach: Zoltan Palancsa
- Finalist: Sweden

The 2013 World Mixed Doubles Curling Championship was held from April 13 to 20 at the newly constructed Grant-Harvey Centre in Fredericton, New Brunswick. The event was held in conjunction with the 2013 World Senior Curling Championships. This event marked the first time that Canada has hosted a World Mixed Doubles Curling Championship since its inception in 2008.

== Teams ==
The teams are listed as follows:

=== Grey Pool ===
England	Estonia	Finland
Male: Ben Fowler; Female: Anna Fowler	Male: Martin Lill; Female: Kristiine Lill	Male: Kalle Kiiskinen; Female: Katja Kiiskinen
Latvia	Netherlands	Norway
Male: Renārs Freidensons; Female: Evita Regža	Male: Mark Neeleman; Female: Marianne Neeleman	Male: Magnus Nedregotten; Female: Kristin Moen Skaslien
Scotland	Slovakia	Sweden
Male: Bruce Mouat; Female: Gina Aitken	Male: Pavol Pitoňák; Female: Gabriela Kajanová	Male: Fredrik Hallström; Female: Elisabeth Norredahl

=== Yellow Pool ===
Australia	Austria	Czech Republic
Male: Jay Merchant; Female: Lynette Gill	Male: Christian Roth; Female: Claudia Toth	Male: Tomáš Paul; Female: Zuzana Hájková
Denmark	France	Japan
Male: Are Solberg; Female: Lilian Nielsen	Male: Romain Borini; Female: Pauline Jeanneret	Male: Hiroaki Kashiwagi; Female: Yumiko Sato
New Zealand	Slovenia	United States
Male: Hans Frauenlob; Female: Natalie Campbell	Male: Tomas Tišler; Female: Nadja Papan	Male: Peter Stolt; Female: Maureen Stolt

=== Blue Pool ===
Canada	China	Hungary
Male: Robert Desjardins; Female: Isabelle Néron	Male: Ma Yanlong; Female: Yu Xinna	Male: Zsolt Kiss; Female: Dorottya Palancsa
Italy	Russia	Romania
Male: Alessio Gonin; Female: Giorgia Ricca	Male: Alexey Kamnev; Female: Yana Nekrasova	Male: Valentin Gheorge Anghelinei; Female: Ana-Maria Saracu
South Korea	Spain	Switzerland
Male: Ahn Jae-sung; Female: Synn Hyun-ho	Male: Sergio Vez Labrador; Female: Irantzu Garcia Vez	Male: Martin Rios; Female: Nadine Lehmann

== Round robin standings ==
Final Round Robin Standings

Key
Teams to Playoffs
Teams to Tiebreaker (winner moves on to Draw Shot Challenge)
Teams to Draw Shot Challenge (team with best moves to playoffs, other two play in qualification game)

Grey Pool	W	L
Scotland	6	2
Sweden	6	2
Netherlands	6	2
Norway	6	2
Estonia	4	4
Finland	3	5
Slovakia	3	5
Latvia	2	6
England	0	8

Yellow Pool	W	L
New Zealand	7	1
Austria	7	1
Czech Republic	6	2
United States	4	4
Japan	4	4
Denmark	3	5
France	3	5
Australia	2	6
Slovenia	0	8

Blue Pool	W	L
Switzerland	8	0
Hungary	7	1
Russia	5	3
China	4	4
Canada	4	4
Italy	4	4
Spain	3	5
South Korea	1	7
Romania	0	8

== Round robin results ==
=== Grey Pool ===
==== Saturday, April 13 ====
Draw 1 9:00

Sheet A	1	2	3	4	5	6	7	8	Final
Netherlands	1	0	3	0	0	0	1	0	5
Scotland	0	2	0	4	1	1	0	2	10

Sheet B	1	2	3	4	5	6	7	8	Final
Norway	2	1	0	5	0	0	1	X	9
Finland	0	0	1	0	1	1	0	X	3

Sheet C	1	2	3	4	5	6	7	8	Final
Estonia	0	2	0	2	1	0	0	0	5
Sweden	1	0	3	0	0	1	1	1	7

Sheet D	1	2	3	4	5	6	7	8	Final
Latvia	1	2	2	1	0	0	3	X	9
England	0	0	0	0	2	1	0	X	3

Draw 4 20:00

Sheet A	1	2	3	4	5	6	7	8	Final
Sweden	0	5	1	0	2	0	1	2	11
Finland	1	0	0	2	0	3	0	0	6

Sheet B	1	2	3	4	5	6	7	8	Final
Scotland	1	0	2	0	3	1	0	X	7
England	0	1	0	1	0	0	1	X	3

Sheet C	1	2	3	4	5	6	7	8	Final
Slovakia	5	0	1	1	0	0	2	0	9
Norway	0	2	0	0	5	2	0	1	10

Sheet D	1	2	3	4	5	6	7	8	Final
Estonia	1	0	0	2	0	1	0	0	4
Netherlands	0	3	1	0	1	0	1	3	9

==== Sunday, April 14 ====
Draw 7 14:30

Sheet A	1	2	3	4	5	6	7	8	Final
England	2	0	0	0	3	0	0	X	5
Norway	0	1	1	2	0	3	2	X	9

Sheet B	1	2	3	4	5	6	7	8	Final
Slovakia	1	2	0	0	4	0	0	0	7
Estonia	0	0	2	1	0	2	3	1	9

Sheet C	1	2	3	4	5	6	7	8	Final
Netherlands	4	0	2	0	3	1	0	X	10
Latvia	0	2	0	1	0	0	1	X	4

Sheet D	1	2	3	4	5	6	7	8	Final
Sweden	2	0	0	1	0	1	1	0	5
Scotland	0	1	1	0	3	0	0	3	8

==== Monday, April 15 ====
Draw 10 9:00

Sheet A	1	2	3	4	5	6	7	8	Final
Estonia	2	1	2	0	2	0	0	2	9
Latvia	0	0	0	2	0	1	2	0	5

Sheet B	1	2	3	4	5	6	7	8	Final
Netherlands	1	0	3	0	1	1	0	0	6
Sweden	0	3	0	3	0	0	2	1	9

Sheet C	1	2	3	4	5	6	7	8	Final
Scotland	2	0	2	1	1	0	5	X	11
Finland	0	3	0	0	0	1	0	X	4

Sheet D	1	2	3	4	5	6	7	8	Final
England	1	2	3	0	0	0	1	0	7
Slovakia	0	0	0	2	5	1	0	1	9

Draw 13 19:30

Sheet B	1	2	3	4	5	6	7	8	Final
Latvia	0	0	2	0	3	1	0	0	6
Norway	2	1	0	1	0	0	2	1	7

Sheet C	1	2	3	4	5	6	7	8	Final
Sweden	1	0	2	1	0	1	0	1	6
England	0	2	0	0	1	0	1	0	4

Sheet D	1	2	3	4	5	6	7	8	Final
Finland	0	0	0	2	0	0	0	X	2
Estonia	1	1	1	0	2	2	1	X	8

Sheet E	1	2	3	4	5	6	7	8	Final
Slovakia	1	0	0	0	0	0	1	0	2
Netherlands	0	1	1	2	1	1	0	1	7

==== Tuesday, April 16 ====
Draw 16 14:30

Sheet B	1	2	3	4	5	6	7	8	Final
Estonia	0	0	1	0	1	0	1	X	3
Scotland	3	1	0	1	0	3	0	X	8

Sheet C	1	2	3	4	5	6	7	8	Final
Latvia	3	0	1	2	0	1	2	0	9
Slovakia	0	1	0	0	3	0	0	1	5

Sheet D	1	2	3	4	5	6	7	8	9	Final
Norway	3	0	1	0	1	0	0	1	0	6
Sweden	0	1	0	2	0	2	1	0	3	9

Sheet E	1	2	3	4	5	6	7	8	Final
Finland	0	1	0	1	1	0	1	1	5
England	1	0	1	0	0	2	0	0	4

==== Wednesday, April 17 ====
Draw 19 9:00

Sheet B	1	2	3	4	5	6	7	8	Final
Sweden	1	2	0	0	1	0	0	0	4
Slovakia	0	0	3	1	0	2	3	1	10

Sheet C	1	2	3	4	5	6	7	8	9	Final
Finland	0	1	1	1	0	0	2	1	0	6
Netherlands	2	0	0	0	3	1	0	0	1	7

Sheet D	1	2	3	4	5	6	7	8	9	Final
Scotland	3	1	1	1	0	0	1	0	1	8
Latvia	0	0	0	0	1	2	0	4	0	7

Sheet E	1	2	3	4	5	6	7	8	Final
Norway	1	0	2	3	1	0	2	X	9
Estonia	0	1	0	0	0	1	0	X	2

Draw 22 19:30

Sheet B	1	2	3	4	5	6	7	8	Final
England	2	0	0	1	0	0	1	X	4
Netherlands	0	4	1	0	3	2	0	X	10

Sheet C	1	2	3	4	5	6	7	8	Final
Norway	0	1	0	0	1	1	0	3	6
Scotland	1	0	1	0	0	0	3	0	5

Sheet D	1	2	3	4	5	6	7	8	Final
Slovakia	0	1	3	0	0	0	1	0	5
Finland	1	0	0	2	1	3	0	1	8

Sheet E	1	2	3	4	5	6	7	8	Final
Latvia	0	0	0	2	1	0	2	X	5
Sweden	3	3	1	0	0	1	0	X	8

==== Thursday, April 18 ====
Draw 25 14:30

Sheet A	1	2	3	4	5	6	7	8	Final
Scotland	2	0	3	0	2	0	0	0	7
Slovakia	0	2	0	1	0	1	3	2	9

Sheet B	1	2	3	4	5	6	7	8	Final
Finland	1	0	3	1	0	0	1	1	7
Latvia	0	1	0	0	1	1	0	0	3

Sheet C	1	2	3	4	5	6	7	8	Final
England	0	0	0	2	0	2	2	0	6
Estonia	1	3	1	0	3	0	0	1	9

Sheet D	1	2	3	4	5	6	7	8	Final
Netherlands	0	2	1	0	0	0	3	1	7
Norway	1	0	0	1	1	1	0	0	4

=== Yellow Pool ===
==== Saturday, April 13 ====
Draw 2 12:30

Sheet A	1	2	3	4	5	6	7	8	Final
Austria	3	0	1	1	1	0	0	2	8
Japan	0	2	0	0	0	2	1	0	5

Sheet B	1	2	3	4	5	6	7	8	Final
Czech Republic	0	2	4	0	1	1	1	0	9
United States	1	0	0	3	0	0	0	1	5

Sheet C	1	2	3	4	5	6	7	8	Final
Slovenia	0	0	0	1	0	2	0	0	3
New Zealand	1	3	1	0	0	0	2	0	7

Sheet E	1	2	3	4	5	6	7	8	Final
France	0	0	0	0	3	0	0	X	3
Denmark	1	3	4	2	0	1	1	X	12

==== Sunday, April 14 ====
Draw 5 8:00

Sheet B	1	2	3	4	5	6	7	8	Final
Japan	3	0	2	2	0	4	0	X	11
Australia	0	1	0	0	1	0	4	X	6

Sheet C	1	2	3	4	5	6	7	8	Final
France	0	3	1	0	0	2	0	1	7
Austria	3	0	0	3	2	0	1	0	9

Sheet D	1	2	3	4	5	6	7	8	Final
Denmark	0	1	1	1	0	2	0	0	5
New Zealand	1	0	0	0	3	0	1	1	6

Sheet E	1	2	3	4	5	6	7	8	Final
Czech Republic	3	0	1	0	1	1	1	X	7
Slovenia	0	1	0	1	0	0	0	X	2

Draw 8 17:45

Sheet A	1	2	3	4	5	6	7	8	Final
New Zealand	0	0	0	0	1	0	0	X	1
Czech Republic	1	1	1	1	0	2	2	X	8

Sheet B	1	2	3	4	5	6	7	8	Final
Austria	3	1	2	0	1	0	1	1	9
Denmark	0	0	0	3	0	3	0	0	6

Sheet D	1	2	3	4	5	6	7	8	Final
Slovenia	0	0	0	0	0	1	X	X	1
France	3	1	3	1	1	0	X	X	9

Sheet E	1	2	3	4	5	6	7	8	Final
United States	0	1	1	0	2	0	2	0	6
Australia	1	0	0	3	0	1	0	2	7

==== Monday, April 15 ====
Draw 11 12:30

Sheet A	1	2	3	4	5	6	7	8	Final
Australia	1	1	0	0	2	0	0	X	4
France	0	0	3	1	0	1	1	X	6

Sheet C	1	2	3	4	5	6	7	8	Final
Denmark	0	1	0	2	0	0	2	0	5
United States	1	0	3	0	1	1	0	1	7

Sheet D	1	2	3	4	5	6	7	8	Final
New Zealand	1	0	5	0	0	0	0	2	8
Austria	0	1	0	1	1	1	2	0	6

Sheet E	1	2	3	4	5	6	7	8	Final
Japan	1	1	0	3	0	1	1	4	11
Czech Republic	0	0	1	0	5	0	0	0	6

==== Tuesday, April 16 ====
Draw 14 8:00

Sheet A	1	2	3	4	5	6	7	8	Final
Slovenia	0	1	0	1	0	0	0	0	2
United States	1	0	1	0	1	1	1	1	6

Sheet B	1	2	3	4	5	6	7	8	Final
France	0	3	2	1	0	0	2	X	8
Japan	1	0	0	0	1	2	0	X	4

Sheet C	1	2	3	4	5	6	7	8	Final
Austria	1	0	3	1	0	2	X	X	7
Australia	0	1	0	0	1	0	X	X	2

Sheet D	1	2	3	4	5	6	7	8	Final
Czech Republic	0	2	1	1	1	0	0	1	6
Denmark	1	0	0	0	0	1	1	0	3

Draw 17 17:45

Sheet A	1	2	3	4	5	6	7	8	Final
France	0	0	0	0	0	1	X	X	1
New Zealand	1	2	3	2	1	0	X	X	9

Sheet B	1	2	3	4	5	6	7	8	Final
United States	0	1	0	4	1	1	0	0	7
Austria	4	0	3	0	0	0	1	2	10

Sheet D	1	2	3	4	5	6	7	8	9	Final
Australia	0	1	0	0	4	0	2	1	1	9
Slovenia	4	0	2	1	0	1	0	0	0	8

Sheet E	1	2	3	4	5	6	7	8	Final
Denmark	1	0	2	1	0	0	4	0	8
Japan	0	2	0	0	3	1	0	3	9

==== Wednesday, April 17 ====
Draw 20 12:30

Sheet A	1	2	3	4	5	6	7	8	Final
Czech Republic	2	0	0	2	2	1	1	X	8
Australia	0	3	1	0	0	0	0	X	4

Sheet B	1	2	3	4	5	6	7	8	Final
Denmark	0	2	1	0	1	2	0	X	6
Slovenia	1	0	0	1	0	0	1	X	3

Sheet C	1	2	3	4	5	6	7	8	Final
New Zealand	3	1	0	0	2	0	1	0	7
Japan	0	0	1	1	0	1	0	1	4

Sheet D	1	2	3	4	5	6	7	8	Final
France	0	0	2	0	1	0	0	X	3
United States	2	1	0	3	0	3	1	X	10

==== Thursday, April 18 ====
Draw 23 8:00

Sheet A	1	2	3	4	5	6	7	8	9	Final
Japan	2	0	0	2	0	1	1	0	1	7
Slovenia	0	2	1	0	1	0	0	2	0	6

Sheet C	1	2	3	4	5	6	7	8	Final
Australia	2	0	1	1	0	0	0	0	4
Denmark	0	2	1	0	0	2	1	3	9

Sheet D	1	2	3	4	5	6	7	8	Final
Austria	4	0	2	0	1	1	0	X	8
Czech Republic	0	2	0	1	0	0	3	X	6

Sheet E	1	2	3	4	5	6	7	8	Final
New Zealand	1	0	0	2	0	2	1	0	6
United States	0	2	1	0	1	0	0	1	5

Draw 26 17:45

Sheet B	1	2	3	4	5	6	7	8	Final
Australia	0	0	0	1	1	0	2	0	4
New Zealand	2	1	1	0	0	1	0	2	7

Sheet C	1	2	3	4	5	6	7	8	Final
Czech Republic	0	2	0	2	0	2	1	X	7
France	1	0	1	0	1	0	0	X	3

Sheet D	1	2	3	4	5	6	7	8	Final
United States	0	1	2	1	2	2	2	X	10
Japan	1	0	0	0	0	0	0	X	1

Sheet E	1	2	3	4	5	6	7	8	Final
Slovenia	0	0	1	0	2	0	1	X	4
Austria	1	1	0	3	0	3	0	X	8

=== Blue Pool ===
==== Saturday, April 13 ====
Draw 3 16:30

Sheet A	1	2	3	4	5	6	7	8	Final
South Korea	0	1	1	0	0	0	0	X	2
Switzerland	1	0	0	3	2	3	2	X	11

Sheet B	1	2	3	4	5	6	7	8	Final
Spain	0	0	0	0	1	0	X	X	1
Hungary	4	4	2	1	0	3	X	X	14

Sheet C	1	2	3	4	5	6	7	8	Final
China	0	0	2	0	3	1	0	0	6
Russia	1	2	0	1	0	0	4	1	9

Sheet D	1	2	3	4	5	6	7	8	Final
Italy	0	1	0	1	0	0	2	X	4
Canada	4	0	1	0	1	1	0	X	7

==== Sunday, April 14 ====
Draw 6 11:15

Sheet A	1	2	3	4	5	6	7	8	Final
Russia	0	0	1	0	1	1	2	0	5
Hungary	2	1	0	2	0	0	0	1	6

Sheet B	1	2	3	4	5	6	7	8	Final
Switzerland	0	1	3	3	4	0	1	X	12
Canada	2	0	0	0	0	3	0	X	5

Sheet C	1	2	3	4	5	6	7	8	Final
Romania	0	3	0	1	0	0	X	X	4
Spain	2	0	5	0	5	1	X	X	13

Sheet D	1	2	3	4	5	6	7	8	Final
China	4	1	1	3	1	0	X	X	10
South Korea	0	0	0	0	0	1	X	X	1

Draw 9 21:00

Sheet A	1	2	3	4	5	6	7	8	Final
Canada	0	0	0	1	0	2	3	0	6
Spain	3	1	1	0	1	0	0	1	7

Sheet B	1	2	3	4	5	6	7	8	Final
Romania	0	1	1	0	0	0	X	X	2
China	4	0	0	4	2	1	X	X	11

Sheet C	1	2	3	4	5	6	7	8	9	Final
South Korea	0	2	1	1	0	2	0	1	0	7
Italy	1	0	0	0	3	0	3	0	1	8

Sheet D	1	2	3	4	5	6	7	8	Final
Russia	0	0	1	0	0	0	1	X	2
Switzerland	1	2	0	3	2	1	0	X	9

==== Monday, April 15 ====
Draw 12 16:00

Sheet A	1	2	3	4	5	6	7	8	Final
China	0	0	0	5	2	2	0	X	9
Italy	2	1	3	0	0	0	6	X	12

Sheet B	1	2	3	4	5	6	7	8	9	Final
South Korea	1	0	1	1	1	2	0	0	0	6
Russia	0	2	0	0	0	0	2	2	2	8

Sheet C	1	2	3	4	5	6	7	8	Final
Switzerland	2	1	1	0	2	0	2	0	8
Hungary	0	0	0	1	0	5	0	1	7

Sheet D	1	2	3	4	5	6	7	8	Final
Canada	0	3	0	4	1	0	4	X	12
Romania	1	0	1	0	0	1	0	X	3

==== Tuesday, April 16 ====
Draw 15 11:15

Sheet B	1	2	3	4	5	6	7	8	Final
Russia	2	2	2	2	1	1	X	X	10
Romania	0	0	0	0	0	0	X	X	0

Sheet C	1	2	3	4	5	6	7	8	Final
Hungary	3	2	0	3	4	1	X	X	13
South Korea	0	0	1	0	0	0	X	X	1

Sheet D	1	2	3	4	5	6	7	8	Final
Switzerland	2	5	1	2	3	0	X	X	13
Italy	0	0	0	0	0	1	X	X	1

Sheet E	1	2	3	4	5	6	7	8	Final
Spain	0	0	1	1	0	0	0	0	2
China	2	1	0	0	2	1	1	0	7

Draw 18 21:00

Sheet B	1	2	3	4	5	6	7	8	Final
China	0	4	1	0	0	2	0	0	7
Switzerland	1	0	0	3	1	0	3	2	10

Sheet C	1	2	3	4	5	6	7	8	Final
Italy	1	1	1	2	1	0	4	X	10
Romania	0	0	0	0	0	2	0	X	2

Sheet D	1	2	3	4	5	6	7	8	Final
Spain	0	1	1	0	0	0	0	X	2
Russia	1	0	0	1	2	1	2	X	7

Sheet E	1	2	3	4	5	6	7	8	Final
Hungary	0	3	1	1	2	1	0	X	8
Canada	1	0	0	0	0	0	3	X	4

==== Wednesday, April 17 ====
Draw 21 16:00

Sheet B	1	2	3	4	5	6	7	8	Final
Italy	1	0	0	2	1	0	2	1	7
Spain	0	1	2	0	0	2	0	0	5

Sheet C	1	2	3	4	5	6	7	8	Final
Russia	0	0	0	1	0	3	0	0	4
Canada	1	1	1	0	3	0	1	1	8

Sheet D	1	2	3	4	5	6	7	8	Final
Hungary	0	2	2	4	0	1	2	X	11
China	1	0	0	0	1	0	0	X	2

Sheet E	1	2	3	4	5	6	7	8	Final
Romania	0	0	0	1	0	0	X	X	1
South Korea	1	2	4	0	4	1	X	X	12

==== Thursday, April 18 ====
Draw 24 11:15

Sheet B	1	2	3	4	5	6	7	8	Final
Canada	4	0	1	0	2	2	2	X	11
South Korea	0	2	0	1	0	0	0	X	3

Sheet C	1	2	3	4	5	6	7	8	Final
Spain	0	1	0	0	1	1	0	X	3
Switzerland	2	0	1	1	0	0	1	X	5

Sheet D	1	2	3	4	5	6	7	8	Final
Romania	0	0	0	0	0	0	X	X	0
Hungary	4	1	3	1	2	1	X	X	12

Sheet E	1	2	3	4	5	6	7	8	Final
Italy	0	0	1	0	0	2	0	X	3
Russia	1	1	0	1	2	0	1	X	6

Draw 27 21:00

Sheet A	1	2	3	4	5	6	7	8	Final
Switzerland	1	2	0	1	2	0	3	X	9
Romania	0	0	1	0	0	2	0	X	3

Sheet B	1	2	3	4	5	6	7	8	Final
Hungary	3	1	2	2	1	2	X	X	11
Italy	0	0	0	0	0	0	X	X	0

Sheet C	1	2	3	4	5	6	7	8	Final
Canada	0	0	1	0	0	0	2	X	3
China	1	2	0	1	1	1	0	X	6

Sheet D	1	2	3	4	5	6	7	8	Final
South Korea	0	1	0	0	0	3	0	X	4
Spain	4	0	3	1	1	0	2	X	11

== Tiebreaker ==
Friday, April 19, 9:00

Sheet D	1	2	3	4	5	6	7	8	Final
Norway	2	0	4	1	0	1	1	X	9
Netherlands	0	4	0	0	1	0	0	X	5

== Playoffs ==
Qualification Game
Y3	Czech Republic	8
B3	Russia	3

Quarterfinals
B1	Switzerland	4
G3	Norway	9
G1	Scotland	4
G2	Sweden	6
Y2	Austria	4
B2	Hungary	7
Y1	New Zealand	2
Y3	Czech Republic	9

Semifinals
G3	Norway	5
G2	Sweden	7
B2	Hungary	10
Y3	Czech Republic	5

Gold Medal Game
G2	Sweden	7
B2	Hungary	8

Bronze Medal Game
G3	Norway	1
Y3	Czech Republic	8

=== Qualification Game ===
Friday, April 19, 13:30

Sheet C	1	2	3	4	5	6	7	8	Final
Czech Republic	3	0	2	1	0	2	0	X	8
Russia	0	1	0	0	1	0	1	X	3

=== Quarterfinals ===
Friday, April 19, 18:00

Sheet A	1	2	3	4	5	6	7	8	Final
Switzerland	0	1	0	0	2	0	1	X	4
Norway	2	0	4	1	0	2	0	X	9

Sheet B	1	2	3	4	5	6	7	8	Final
Scotland	1	0	1	0	0	0	1	1	4
Sweden	0	1	0	3	1	1	0	0	6

Sheet D	1	2	3	4	5	6	7	8	Final
Austria	0	0	2	1	0	1	0	X	4
Hungary	1	1	0	0	3	0	2	X	7

Sheet E	1	2	3	4	5	6	7	8	Final
New Zealand	1	1	0	0	0	0	0	X	2
Czech Republic	0	0	1	1	3	1	3	X	9

=== Semifinals ===
Saturday, April 20, 11:00

Sheet D	1	2	3	4	5	6	7	8	Final
Norway	0	3	0	2	0	0	0	0	5
Sweden	1	0	2	0	1	1	1	1	7

Sheet A	1	2	3	4	5	6	7	8	Final
Hungary	2	0	3	1	0	1	1	2	10
Czech Republic	0	2	0	0	3	0	0	0	5

=== Bronze medal game ===
Saturday, April 20, 17:00

Sheet B	1	2	3	4	5	6	7	8	Final
Norway	0	0	1	0	0	0	X	X	1
Czech Republic	2	1	0	1	3	1	X	X	8

=== Gold medal game ===
Saturday, April 20, 17:00

Sheet C	1	2	3	4	5	6	7	8	9	Final
Sweden	2	0	0	3	0	2	0	0	0	7
Hungary	0	1	1	0	2	0	2	1	1	8

2013 World Mixed Doubles Curling Championship winner
(Hungary)
Hungary
1st title
