= 2014 World Mixed Doubles Curling Championship =

- Host city: Dumfries, Scotland
- Arena: Dumfries Ice Bowl
- Dates: April 23–30, 2014
- Winner: Switzerland
- Female: Michelle Gribi
- Male: Reto Gribi
- Coach: Allan Moore
- Finalist: Sweden

The 2014 World Mixed Doubles Curling Championship were held from April 23 to 30 at the Dumfries Ice Bowl in Dumfries, Scotland. The event was held in conjunction with the 2014 World Senior Curling Championships.

Switzerland continued their dominance of the championship with a fifth title win by cousins Michelle and Reto Gribi over Sweden's Per Noreen and Camilla Johansson, who won their second silver medal as a pair and third consecutive silver medal for Sweden. Switzerland won with a score of 8–6. Spain's Irantzu Garcia and Sergio Vez won the first World Curling medal for Spain in the bronze medal game with a 7–4 win over defending champions Dorottya Palansca and Zsolt Kiss of Hungary.

Canada, Norway, and England scored perfect ends in their games in Draws 5, 11, and 22, respectively.

== Teams ==
The teams are listed as follows:

=== Group A ===
Austria	Belarus	Denmark
Female: Claudia Fischer; Male: Christian Roth	Female: Ekaterina Kirillova; Male: Dmitry Kirillov	Female: Louise Hertsdahl; Male: Flemming Christensen
England	Hungary	Italy
Female: Angharad Ward; Male: Bryan Zachary	Female: Dorottya Palancsa; Male: Zsolt Kiss	Female: Giorgia Ricca; Male: Alessio Gonin
Russia	South Korea	Wales
Female: Victoria Moiseeva; Male: Alexander Krushelnitskiy	Female: Lee Hye-in; Male: Beak Jong-chul	Female: Dawn Watson; Male: Adrian Meikle

=== Group B ===
Brazil	Canada	Estonia
Female: Aline Lima Gonçalves; Male: Marcelo Cabral de Mello	Female: Kim Tuck; Male: Wayne Tuck, Jr.	Female: Maile Mölder; Male: Erkki Lill
Finland	Kazakhstan	Latvia
Female: Eszter Juhasz; Male: Markku Uusipaavalniemi	Female: Olga Ten; Male: Aleksandr Orlov	Female: Dace Regža; Male: Ansis Regža
Scotland	Slovenia	Sweden
Female: Gina Aitken; Male: Bruce Mouat	Female: Valentina Jurinčič; Male: Jure Culic	Female: Camilla Johansson; Male: Per Noréen

=== Group C ===
Australia	Czech Republic	Japan
Female: Laurei Weeden; Male: Ian Palangio	Female: Zuzana Hájková; Male: Tomáš Paul	Female: Mitsuki Satoh; Male: Yasuo Mochida
Netherlands	Poland	Romania
Female: Marianne Neeleman; Male: Ezra Wiebe	Female: Adela Walczak; Male: Łukasz Piworowicz	Female: Diana Butucea; Male: Allen Coliban
Slovakia	Switzerland	
Female: Veronika Kvardova; Male: Ladislav Derzsi	Female: Michelle Gribi; Male: Reto Gribi	

=== Group D ===
China	France	Germany
Female: Liu Sijia; Male: Guo Wenli	Female: Delphine Charlet; Male: Tony Angiboust	Female: Andrea Fischer; Male: Stefan Knohl
Ireland	New Zealand	Norway
Female: Louise Kerr; Male: John Furey	Female: Waverly Taylor; Male: Kenneth Thomson	Female: Kristin Skaslien; Male: Magnus Nedregotten
Spain	United States	
Female: Irantzu Garcia; Male: Sergio Vez	Female: Joyance Meechai; Male: Steve Gebauer	

== Round-robin standings ==
Final round-robin standings

Key
Teams to Playoffs

Group A	W	L
Russia	8	0
Hungary	7	1
Austria	5	3
South Korea	5	3
Wales	4	4
Italy	3	5
Denmark	2	6
Belarus	1	7
England	1	7

Group B	W	L
Sweden	8	0
Canada	7	1
Scotland	6	2
Finland	4	4
Latvia	3	5
Estonia	3	5
Kazakhstan	2	6
Slovenia	2	6
Brazil	1	7

Group C	W	L
Czech Republic	6	1
Switzerland	6	1
Australia	5	2
Poland	4	3
Japan	3	4
Netherlands	2	5
Romania	2	5
Slovakia	0	7

Group D	W	L
Norway	7	0
Spain	5	2
China	5	2
France	4	3
United States	3	4
New Zealand	2	5
Germany	1	6
Ireland	1	6

== Round-robin results ==
=== Group A ===
==== Thursday, April 24 ====
Draw 1 8:15

Sheet A	1	2	3	4	5	6	7	8	Final
South Korea	0	2	1	1	0	2	2	X	8
Italy	1	0	0	0	2	0	0	X	3

Sheet B	1	2	3	4	5	6	7	8	Final
Russia	0	1	0	3	0	3	0	1	9
Denmark	3	0	1	0	3	0	1	0	8

Sheet C	1	2	3	4	5	6	7	8	Final
Belarus	1	0	1	0	0	0	0	X	2
Hungary	0	2	0	3	2	1	1	X	9

Sheet D	1	2	3	4	5	6	7	8	Final
Austria	0	1	0	0	2	0	4	0	7
Wales	3	0	2	1	0	2	0	1	9

Draw 4 19:30

Sheet A	1	2	3	4	5	6	7	8	Final
Hungary	0	0	0	4	0	1	2	0	7
Denmark	1	1	1	0	1	0	0	2	6

Sheet B	1	2	3	4	5	6	7	8	Final
Italy	1	0	0	2	0	1	0	1	5
Wales	0	1	3	0	2	0	2	0	8

Sheet C	1	2	3	4	5	6	7	8	9	Final
England	1	0	1	0	2	1	0	1	0	6
Russia	0	2	0	3	0	0	1	0	1	7

Sheet D	1	2	3	4	5	6	7	8	Final
Belarus	2	1	0	1	0	1	0	0	5
South Korea	0	0	4	0	1	0	1	2	8

==== Friday, April 25 ====
Draw 6 11:15

Sheet A	1	2	3	4	5	6	7	8	Final
Wales	0	1	0	0	0	0	0	X	1
Russia	3	0	5	2	1	2	1	X	14

Sheet B	1	2	3	4	5	6	7	8	Final
England	1	0	2	2	0	0	3	0	8
Belarus	0	2	0	0	3	2	0	2	9

Sheet C	1	2	3	4	5	6	7	8	Final
South Korea	0	1	0	3	0	1	0	1	6
Austria	1	0	2	0	1	0	3	0	7

Sheet E	1	2	3	4	5	6	7	8	Final
Hungary	4	1	1	2	0	2	X	X	10
Italy	0	0	0	0	1	0	X	X	1

Draw 9 21:00

Sheet A	1	2	3	4	5	6	7	8	Final
Belarus	2	0	1	0	1	0	0	X	4
Austria	0	2	0	1	0	2	4	X	9

Sheet B	1	2	3	4	5	6	7	8	Final
South Korea	0	0	3	0	0	0	X	X	3
Hungary	1	4	0	3	1	3	X	X	12

Sheet C	1	2	3	4	5	6	7	8	Final
Italy	0	0	1	1	1	1	0	4	8
Denmark	2	1	0	0	0	0	2	0	5

Sheet D	1	2	3	4	5	6	7	8	Final
Wales	3	0	1	2	0	2	0	1	9
England	0	3	0	0	1	0	3	0	7

==== Saturday, April 26 ====
Draw 12 14:30

Sheet B	1	2	3	4	5	6	7	8	Final
Austria	1	0	0	1	1	0	2	0	5
Russia	0	2	1	0	0	3	0	1	7

Sheet C	1	2	3	4	5	6	7	8	Final
Hungary	1	0	4	0	0	2	0	3	10
Wales	0	1	0	3	3	0	1	0	8

Sheet D	1	2	3	4	5	6	7	8	Final
Denmark	2	0	5	0	0	4	X	X	11
Belarus	0	2	0	1	2	0	X	X	5

Sheet E	1	2	3	4	5	6	7	8	Final
England	0	2	0	0	0	0	X	X	2
South Korea	3	0	2	1	1	3	X	X	10

==== Sunday, April 27 ====
Draw 15 8:00

Sheet B	1	2	3	4	5	6	7	8	Final
Belarus	0	0	1	0	1	1	0	X	3
Italy	5	1	0	1	0	0	3	X	10

Sheet C	1	2	3	4	5	6	7	8	Final
Austria	5	0	5	0	3	2	X	X	15
England	0	1	0	3	0	0	X	X	4

Sheet D	1	2	3	4	5	6	7	8	Final
Russia	1	0	2	0	1	0	0	1	5
Hungary	0	1	0	1	0	1	1	0	4

Sheet E	1	2	3	4	5	6	7	8	Final
Denmark	0	0	1	1	1	1	2	X	6
Wales	1	1	0	0	0	0	0	X	2

Draw 18 17:45

Sheet B	1	2	3	4	5	6	7	8	Final
Hungary	3	0	0	2	2	1	1	X	9
England	0	2	1	0	0	0	0	X	3

Draw 19 21:00

Sheet C	1	2	3	4	5	6	7	8	Final
Denmark	1	1	0	0	0	2	1	0	5
South Korea	0	0	1	3	1	0	0	1	6

Sheet D	1	2	3	4	5	6	7	8	Final
Italy	1	0	4	0	0	0	0	0	5
Austria	0	1	0	1	1	1	3	1	8

Sheet E	1	2	3	4	5	6	7	8	Final
Russia	5	0	1	2	3	4	X	X	15
Belarus	0	1	0	0	0	0	X	X	1

==== Monday, April 28 ====
Draw 21 11:15

Sheet B	1	2	3	4	5	6	7	8	Final
Wales	0	1	0	1	0	0	X	X	2
South Korea	1	0	2	0	2	4	X	X	9

Draw 22 14:30

Sheet C	1	2	3	4	5	6	7	8	Final
Russia	2	0	3	0	0	1	3	X	9
Italy	0	1	0	3	1	0	0	X	5

Sheet D	1	2	3	4	5	6	7	8	Final
England	0	6	0	4	1	0	0	X	11
Denmark	1	0	2	0	0	2	2	X	7

Sheet E	1	2	3	4	5	6	7	8	Final
Austria	1	1	0	0	2	0	1	0	5
Hungary	0	0	5	2	0	1	0	1	9

==== Tuesday, April 29 ====
Draw 25 8:00

Sheet A	1	2	3	4	5	6	7	8	Final
Italy	2	3	1	0	0	1	1	X	8
England	0	0	0	1	1	0	0	X	2

Sheet B	1	2	3	4	5	6	7	8	Final
Denmark	2	0	0	0	0	0	2	0	4
Austria	0	1	1	1	2	1	0	1	7

Sheet C	1	2	3	4	5	6	7	8	Final
Wales	1	3	1	1	0	0	1	X	7
Belarus	0	0	0	0	1	1	0	X	2

Sheet D	1	2	3	4	5	6	7	8	Final
South Korea	0	1	1	0	1	0	0	2	5
Russia	2	0	0	1	0	4	1	0	8

=== Group B ===
==== Thursday, April 24 ====
Draw 2 12:00

Sheet A	1	2	3	4	5	6	7	8	Final
Kazakhstan	2	1	0	0	2	0	4	X	9
Slovenia	0	0	1	1	0	1	0	X	3

Sheet B	1	2	3	4	5	6	7	8	Final
Canada	0	0	2	2	0	0	2	0	6
Sweden	1	1	0	0	2	1	0	2	7

Sheet C	1	2	3	4	5	6	7	8	Final
Scotland	1	0	1	0	5	1	0	X	8
Latvia	0	1	0	2	0	0	1	X	4

Sheet D	1	2	3	4	5	6	7	8	Final
Finland	1	1	0	0	2	0	0	2	6
Estonia	0	0	1	1	0	1	2	0	5

==== Friday, April 25 ====
Draw 5 8:00

Sheet A	1	2	3	4	5	6	7	8	Final
Latvia	1	0	2	0	0	2	X	X	5
Canada	0	6	0	3	1	0	X	X	10

Sheet B	1	2	3	4	5	6	7	8	Final
Slovenia	0	1	3	1	0	1	0	0	6
Estonia	1	0	0	0	3	0	2	1	7

Sheet D	1	2	3	4	5	6	7	8	Final
Sweden	4	1	1	3	0	2	2	X	13
Brazil	0	0	0	0	1	0	0	X	1

Sheet E	1	2	3	4	5	6	7	8	Final
Kazakhstan	0	0	0	1	0	2	0	1	4
Scotland	1	1	1	0	2	0	1	0	6

Draw 8 17:45

Sheet A	1	2	3	4	5	6	7	8	Final
Brazil	0	0	0	0	1	0	X	X	1
Scotland	3	2	4	1	0	4	X	X	14

Sheet B	1	2	3	4	5	6	7	8	9	Final
Kazakhstan	2	0	2	1	0	1	1	0	0	7
Finland	0	2	0	0	2	0	0	3	1	8

Sheet D	1	2	3	4	5	6	7	8	Final
Latvia	4	0	1	0	0	3	0	3	11
Slovenia	0	2	0	2	1	0	1	0	6

Sheet E	1	2	3	4	5	6	7	8	Final
Estonia	0	0	0	0	0	1	0	1	2
Sweden	1	1	1	1	1	0	1	0	6

==== Saturday, April 26 ====
Draw 11 11:15

Sheet B	1	2	3	4	5	6	7	8	9	Final
Finland	0	0	0	1	1	0	2	1	0	5
Scotland	2	1	1	0	0	1	0	0	1	6

Sheet C	1	2	3	4	5	6	7	8	Final
Estonia	4	1	1	0	5	0	1	X	12
Brazil	0	0	0	1	0	2	0	X	3

Sheet D	1	2	3	4	5	6	7	8	Final
Kazakhstan	2	2	0	0	2	2	0	1	9
Latvia	0	0	1	2	0	0	2	0	5

Sheet E	1	2	3	4	5	6	7	8	Final
Slovenia	0	0	2	0	0	1	1	0	4
Canada	2	2	0	2	1	0	0	1	8

Draw 14 21:00

Sheet A	1	2	3	4	5	6	7	8	Final
Sweden	0	0	1	0	2	0	3	1	7
Finland	1	1	0	1	0	2	0	0	5

Sheet B	1	2	3	4	5	6	7	8	Final
Estonia	3	0	2	0	0	0	0	1	6
Latvia	0	3	0	2	1	1	2	0	9

Sheet C	1	2	3	4	5	6	7	8	Final
Brazil	3	0	2	2	0	0	1	X	8
Kazakhstan	0	1	0	0	1	1	0	X	3

Sheet D	1	2	3	4	5	6	7	8	Final
Scotland	0	0	3	0	2	0	1	X	6
Canada	2	1	0	2	0	4	0	X	9

==== Sunday, April 27 ====
Draw 16 11:15

Sheet E	1	2	3	4	5	6	7	8	Final
Brazil	0	1	0	0	0	0	0	X	1
Finland	3	0	3	3	1	1	2	X	13

Draw 17 14:30

Sheet A	1	2	3	4	5	6	7	8	Final
Canada	4	0	0	1	2	1	0	0	8
Estonia	0	2	1	0	0	0	3	1	7

Sheet C	1	2	3	4	5	6	7	8	Final
Latvia	0	1	0	0	1	0	X	X	2
Sweden	3	0	2	1	0	3	X	X	9

Sheet D	1	2	3	4	5	6	7	8	Final
Slovenia	0	0	2	0	0	0	X	X	2
Scotland	3	1	0	3	1	4	X	X	12

==== Monday, April 28 ====
Draw 20 8:00

Sheet A	1	2	3	4	5	6	7	8	Final
Scotland	2	0	0	0	0	1	1	X	4
Sweden	0	2	1	1	1	0	0	X	5

Sheet C	1	2	3	4	5	6	7	8	Final
Finland	0	1	1	0	3	0	1	0	5
Slovenia	1	0	0	5	0	1	0	1	8

Sheet D	1	2	3	4	5	6	7	8	Final
Canada	1	2	1	1	1	0	1	0	7
Kazakhstan	0	0	0	0	0	4	0	1	5

Sheet E	1	2	3	4	5	6	7	8	Final
Latvia	4	1	1	1	1	2	0	X	10
Brazil	0	0	0	0	0	0	3	X	3

Draw 22 14:30

Sheet A	1	2	3	4	5	6	7	8	9	Final
Estonia	0	2	0	0	2	0	3	0	2	9
Kazakhstan	1	0	1	2	0	2	0	1	0	7

Sheet B	1	2	3	4	5	6	7	8	Final
Brazil	0	0	1	0	0	2	0	X	3
Canada	4	1	0	2	2	0	1	X	10

Draw 24 21:00

Sheet A	1	2	3	4	5	6	7	8	Final
Finland	1	3	0	2	0	4	0	1	11
Latvia	0	0	3	0	3	0	1	0	7

Sheet E	1	2	3	4	5	6	7	8	Final
Sweden	4	1	0	0	2	2	X	X	9
Slovenia	0	0	1	1	0	0	X	X	2

==== Tuesday, April 29 ====
Draw 25 8:00

Sheet E	1	2	3	4	5	6	7	8	Final
Scotland	1	0	3	0	2	0	4	X	10
Estonia	0	1	0	2	0	1	0	X	4

Draw 26 11:15

Sheet A	1	2	3	4	5	6	7	8	Final
Slovenia	0	3	2	0	4	1	1	X	11
Brazil	2	0	0	2	0	0	0	X	4

Sheet B	1	2	3	4	5	6	7	8	Final
Sweden	0	1	1	1	0	3	0	2	8
Kazakhstan	2	0	0	0	1	0	3	0	6

Sheet C	1	2	3	4	5	6	7	8	Final
Canada	1	0	2	0	1	1	1	1	7
Finland	0	2	0	1	0	0	0	0	3

=== Group C ===
==== Thursday, April 24 ====
Draw 1 8:15

Sheet E	1	2	3	4	5	6	7	8	Final
Czech Republic	4	1	0	4	0	2	3	X	14
Romania	0	0	1	0	1	0	0	X	2

Draw 2 12:00

Sheet E	1	2	3	4	5	6	7	8	Final
Japan	1	1	0	1	0	1	0	1	5
Slovakia	0	0	1	0	2	0	1	0	4

Draw 3 15:45

Sheet A	1	2	3	4	5	6	7	8	Final
Netherlands	2	0	0	0	0	1	1	0	4
Poland	0	1	1	1	1	0	0	1	5

Sheet B	1	2	3	4	5	6	7	8	Final
Australia	0	0	0	1	0	1	0	X	2
Switzerland	3	2	1	0	1	0	2	X	9

==== Friday, April 25 ====
Draw 5 8:00

Sheet C	1	2	3	4	5	6	7	8	Final
Japan	2	3	2	2	1	0	0	X	10
Romania	0	0	0	0	0	4	2	X	6

Draw 6 11:15

Sheet D	1	2	3	4	5	6	7	8	Final
Australia	3	0	3	1	0	2	0	X	9
Poland	0	1	0	0	1	0	3	X	5

Draw 7 14:30

Sheet D	1	2	3	4	5	6	7	8	Final
Czech Republic	2	0	2	0	1	1	0	1	7
Slovakia	0	2	0	3	0	0	1	0	6

Sheet E	1	2	3	4	5	6	7	8	Final
Netherlands	1	0	0	0	5	0	2	0	8
Switzerland	0	1	1	1	0	1	0	1	5

Draw 9 21:00

Sheet E	1	2	3	4	5	6	7	8	Final
Australia	0	1	1	0	1	0	1	2	6
Japan	2	0	0	2	0	1	0	0	5

==== Saturday, April 26 ====
Draw 10 8:00

Sheet B	1	2	3	4	5	6	7	8	Final
Poland	2	1	0	0	0	1	1	0	5
Slovakia	0	0	1	1	1	0	0	1	4

Sheet C	1	2	3	4	5	6	7	8	Final
Czech Republic	1	0	2	1	2	2	0	X	8
Netherlands	0	3	0	0	0	0	2	X	5

Draw 12 14:30

Sheet A	1	2	3	4	5	6	7	8	Final
Switzerland	2	2	0	4	0	2	0	X	10
Romania	0	0	2	0	1	0	2	X	5

Draw 13 17:45

Sheet B	1	2	3	4	5	6	7	8	Final
Netherlands	0	0	1	1	0	0	0	0	2
Japan	1	1	0	0	1	1	1	1	6

Draw 14 21:00

Sheet E	1	2	3	4	5	6	7	8	Final
Romania	0	0	0	0	2	1	0	X	3
Poland	1	2	2	1	0	0	1	X	7

==== Sunday, April 27 ====
Draw 15 8:00

Sheet A	1	2	3	4	5	6	7	8	Final
Czech Republic	0	1	2	2	1	1	0	0	7
Australia	2	0	0	0	0	0	3	1	6

Draw 16 11:15

Sheet A	1	2	3	4	5	6	7	8	Final
Slovakia	1	0	0	2	0	0	X	X	3
Switzerland	0	5	2	0	4	1	X	X	12

Draw 17 14:30

Sheet E	1	2	3	4	5	6	7	8	Final
Poland	0	0	0	0	1	1	0	X	2
Czech Republic	5	1	1	1	0	0	1	X	9

Draw 18 17:45

Sheet C	1	2	3	4	5	6	7	8	Final
Romania	0	3	0	1	0	0	1	0	5
Australia	1	0	2	0	2	1	0	1	7

Sheet D	1	2	3	4	5	6	7	8	Final
Japan	1	0	1	1	0	3	0	1	7
Switzerland	0	2	0	0	3	0	3	0	8

Sheet E	1	2	3	4	5	6	7	8	9	Final
Slovakia	0	1	3	2	1	0	0	1	0	8
Netherlands	4	0	0	0	0	3	1	0	1	9

==== Monday, April 28 ====
Draw 20 8:00

Sheet B	1	2	3	4	5	6	7	8	9	Final
Slovakia	2	0	0	0	0	3	0	1	0	6
Romania	0	1	1	2	1	0	1	0	4	10

Draw 21 11:15

Sheet A	1	2	3	4	5	6	7	8	9	Final
Japan	1	0	0	0	1	1	1	1	0	5
Czech Republic	0	3	1	1	0	0	0	0	1	6

Sheet C	1	2	3	4	5	6	7	8	Final
Switzerland	1	3	4	1	0	1	1	X	11
Poland	0	0	0	0	1	0	0	X	1

Sheet D	1	2	3	4	5	6	7	8	Final
Netherlands	0	0	0	0	1	0	2	X	3
Australia	1	1	1	1	0	5	0	X	9

Draw 23 17:45

Sheet A	1	2	3	4	5	6	7	8	Final
Poland	0	2	2	1	0	0	2	1	8
Japan	2	0	0	0	2	1	0	0	5

Sheet B	1	2	3	4	5	6	7	8	Final
Switzerland	1	1	0	1	1	1	0	1	6
Czech Republic	0	0	3	0	0	0	1	0	4

Sheet C	1	2	3	4	5	6	7	8	Final
Australia	0	0	1	0	1	1	2	2	7
Slovakia	1	1	0	2	0	0	0	0	4

Draw 24 21:00

Sheet D	1	2	3	4	5	6	7	8	Final
Romania	0	2	0	0	2	1	2	X	7
Netherlands	1	0	1	1	0	0	0	X	3

=== Group D ===
==== Thursday, April 24 ====
Draw 3 15:45

Sheet C	1	2	3	4	5	6	7	8	Final
United States	4	1	1	0	2	0	2	X	10
Germany	0	0	0	1	0	1	0	X	2

Sheet D	1	2	3	4	5	6	7	8	Final
France	0	0	2	1	3	3	0	X	9
New Zealand	1	1	0	0	0	0	1	X	3

Sheet E	1	2	3	4	5	6	7	8	Final
China	1	0	2	1	0	1	4	X	9
Ireland	0	2	0	0	2	0	0	X	4

Draw 4 19:30

Sheet E	1	2	3	4	5	6	7	8	Final
Spain	0	0	2	1	1	0	2	X	6
Norway	2	1	0	0	0	5	0	X	8

==== Friday, April 25 ====
Draw 7 14:30

Sheet A	1	2	3	4	5	6	7	8	9	Final
Ireland	0	3	1	0	1	1	0	2	0	8
France	3	0	0	3	0	0	2	0	1	9

Sheet B	1	2	3	4	5	6	7	8	Final
New Zealand	0	0	3	1	0	2	1	X	7
China	3	2	0	0	4	0	0	X	9

Sheet C	1	2	3	4	5	6	7	8	Final
Norway	0	3	1	0	2	2	0	X	8
United States	1	0	0	1	0	0	2	X	4

Draw 8 17:45

Sheet C	1	2	3	4	5	6	7	8	Final
Germany	0	0	2	0	4	0	1	X	7
Spain	1	3	0	4	0	2	0	X	10

==== Saturday, April 26 ====
Draw 10 8:00

Sheet A	1	2	3	4	5	6	7	8	Final
Spain	1	0	0	2	0	1	1	0	5
China	0	1	1	0	1	0	0	1	4

Sheet D	1	2	3	4	5	6	7	8	Final
Germany	1	0	0	2	0	1	0	1	5
Ireland	0	2	1	0	2	0	1	0	6

Sheet E	1	2	3	4	5	6	7	8	Final
France	2	1	0	1	1	1	2	X	8
United States	0	0	1	0	0	0	0	X	1

Draw 11 11:15

Sheet A	1	2	3	4	5	6	7	8	Final
Norway	0	2	2	0	6	0	2	X	12
New Zealand	1	0	0	1	0	2	0	X	4

Draw 13 17:45

Sheet A	1	2	3	4	5	6	7	8	Final
France	1	0	0	0	0	0	3	X	4
Spain	0	1	2	1	1	1	0	X	6

Sheet C	1	2	3	4	5	6	7	8	Final
Ireland	0	0	0	1	0	1	X	X	2
Norway	2	2	3	2	0	2	0	X	9

Sheet D	1	2	3	4	5	6	7	8	9	Final
United States	1	0	1	1	0	1	0	2	0	6
China	0	1	0	0	1	0	4	0	2	8

Sheet E	1	2	3	4	5	6	7	8	Final
New Zealand	0	1	1	0	1	0	3	0	6
Germany	3	0	0	1	0	2	0	1	7

==== Sunday, April 27 ====
Draw 16 11:15

Sheet B	1	2	3	4	5	6	7	8	Final
Germany	0	0	0	0	0	1	X	X	1
France	4	3	3	2	1	0	X	X	13

Sheet C	1	2	3	4	5	6	7	8	Final
Spain	0	1	0	0	0	0	1	X	2
New Zealand	4	0	1	1	1	1	0	X	8

Sheet D	1	2	3	4	5	6	7	8	Final
China	0	1	0	1	0	0	0	X	2
Norway	2	0	1	0	1	1	1	X	6

Draw 17 14:30

Sheet B	1	2	3	4	5	6	7	8	Final
United States	1	1	1	1	2	1	3	X	10
Ireland	0	0	0	0	0	0	0	X	0

Draw 18 17:45

Sheet A	1	2	3	4	5	6	7	8	Final
China	1	2	1	3	0	2	3	X	12
Germany	0	0	0	0	2	0	0	X	2

Draw 19 21:00

Sheet A	1	2	3	4	5	6	7	8	9	Final
New Zealand	3	2	0	0	0	0	1	1	0	7
United States	0	0	3	1	2	1	0	0	2	9

Sheet B	1	2	3	4	5	6	7	8	Final
Ireland	0	2	0	1	0	1	1	X	5
Spain	3	0	3	0	4	0	0	X	10

==== Monday, April 28 ====
Draw 21 11:15

Sheet E	1	2	3	4	5	6	7	8	Final
Norway	1	2	1	2	0	3	0	X	9
France	0	0	0	0	3	0	1	X	4

Draw 23 17:45

Sheet D	1	2	3	4	5	6	7	8	Final
Spain	1	1	1	2	0	1	1	X	7
United States	0	0	0	0	1	0	0	X	1

Sheet E	1	2	3	4	5	6	7	8	9	Final
Ireland	0	0	0	5	1	0	2	0	0	8
New Zealand	2	2	2	0	0	1	0	1	1	9

Draw 24 21:00

Sheet B	1	2	3	4	5	6	7	8	Final
Norway	0	3	0	2	1	0	3	X	9
Germany	1	0	2	0	0	1	0	X	4

Sheet C	1	2	3	4	5	6	7	8	Final
China	0	1	0	0	4	1	0	1	7
France	1	0	2	1	0	0	2	0	6

== Playoffs ==
Round of 16
A2	Hungary	7
B3	Scotland	5
C2	Czech Republic	6
D3	China	5
D2	Spain	7
C3	Australia	6
B2	Canada	6
A3	Austria	7

Quarterfinals
D1	Norway	4
A2	Hungary	7
B1	Sweden	10
C2	Czech Republic	5
A1	Russia	7
D2	Spain	9
C1	Switzerland	9
A3	Austria	7

Semifinals
A2	Hungary	3
B1	Sweden	7
D2	Spain	5
C1	Switzerland	8

Gold Medal Game
B1	Sweden	6
C1	Switzerland	8

Bronze Medal Game
A2	Hungary	4
D2	Spain	7

=== Round of 16 ===
Tuesday, April 29, 15:30

Sheet A	1	2	3	4	5	6	7	8	Final
Hungary	2	0	1	0	2	1	0	1	7
Scotland	0	1	0	3	0	0	1	0	5

Sheet E	1	2	3	4	5	6	7	8	Final
Czech Republic	1	0	2	0	0	1	1	1	6
China	0	3	0	1	1	0	0	0	5

Sheet C	1	2	3	4	5	6	7	8	Final
Spain	1	1	3	1	0	0	1	0	7
Australia	0	0	0	0	3	1	0	2	6

Sheet D	1	2	3	4	5	6	7	8	Final
Canada	1	0	2	0	0	3	0	0	6
Austria	0	1	0	2	1	0	2	1	7

=== Quarterfinals ===
Tuesday, April 29, 20:00

Sheet C	1	2	3	4	5	6	7	8	Final
Norway	1	0	0	0	0	0	3	0	4
Hungary	0	1	1	1	1	2	0	1	7

Sheet D	1	2	3	4	5	6	7	8	Final
Sweden	0	0	3	0	3	1	2	1	10
Czech Republic	2	1	0	2	0	0	0	0	5

Sheet B	1	2	3	4	5	6	7	8	9	Final
Russia	2	1	0	0	0	3	1	0	0	7
Spain	0	0	2	2	1	0	0	2	2	9

Sheet A	1	2	3	4	5	6	7	8	Final
Switzerland	0	2	0	2	0	5	0	X	9
Austria	1	0	2	0	1	0	3	X	7

=== Semifinals ===
Wednesday, April 30, 10:15

Sheet A	1	2	3	4	5	6	7	8	Final
Hungary	0	0	1	1	0	1	0	X	3
Sweden	3	1	0	0	1	0	2	X	7

Sheet D	1	2	3	4	5	6	7	8	Final
Spain	3	0	0	2	0	0	0	0	5
Switzerland	0	1	1	0	2	1	1	2	8

=== Bronze medal game ===
Wednesday, April 30, 15:30

Sheet B	1	2	3	4	5	6	7	8	Final
Hungary	1	0	0	0	0	2	0	1	4
Spain	0	2	1	1	1	0	2	0	7

=== Gold medal game ===
Wednesday, April 30, 15:30

Sheet C	1	2	3	4	5	6	7	8	Final
Sweden	0	3	2	0	0	0	0	1	6
Switzerland	1	0	0	2	2	1	2	0	8
