= 2011 World Mixed Doubles Curling Championship =

- Host city: St. Paul, Minnesota, United States
- Arena: Saint Paul Curling Club
- Dates: April 15–24, 2011
- Winner: Switzerland
- Female: Alina Pätz
- Male: Sven Michel
- Coach: Luzia Ebnöther
- Finalist: Russia

The 2011 World Mixed Doubles Curling Championship was held at the Saint Paul Curling Club in St. Paul, Minnesota, United States from April 15 to 24, 2011. The event was held in conjunction with the 2011 World Senior Curling Championships.

Switzerland won its third mixed doubles gold in four years by defeating the Russians in a six-end final with a final score of 11–2.

== Teams ==
=== Blue Group ===
Canada	Denmark	England
Second: Robert Campbell; Lead: Rebecca Jean MacDonald	Second: Are Solberg; Lead: Lilian Nielsen	Second: John Sharp; Lead: Jane Clark
Italy	Norway	Russia
Second: Alessio Gonin; Lead: Giorgia Ricca	Second: Roy Dorholt; Lead: Guri Tobro	Second: Alexey Tselousov; Lead: Alina Kovaleva
Slovakia	Switzerland	
Second: František Pitoňák; Lead: Petra Pitoňáková	Second: Alina Pätz; Lead: Sven Michel	

=== Red Group ===
Australia	Estonia	Finland
Second: Hugh Millikin; Lead: Kim Forge	Second: Mihhail Vlassov; Lead: Jelizaveta Dmitrijeva	Second: Kalle Kiiskinen; Lead: Katja Kiiskinen
Hungary	Japan	South Korea
Second: György Nagy; Lead: Ildikó Szekeres	Second: Kenji Tomabechi; Lead: Michiko Tomabechi	Second: Hong Jun-Pyo; Lead: Park Kyung-mi
New Zealand	Sweden	
Second: Bridget Becker; Lead: Sean Becker	Second: Anders Kraupp; Lead: Sabina Kraupp	

=== White Group ===
Austria	China	Czech Republic
Second: Thomas Peichl; Lead: Sonja Peichl	Second: Zou Dejia; Lead: Li Xue	Second: Hana Čechová; Lead: Radek Žďárský
France	Latvia	Scotland
Second: Amaury Pernette; Lead: Pauline Jeanneret	Second: Gints Caune; Lead: Līga Caune	Second: Paul Stevenson; Lead: Louise Soutar
Spain	United States	
Second: Sergio Vez Labrador; Lead: Irantzu Garcia Vez	Second: Brady Clark; Lead: Cristin Clark	

== Round-robin standings ==
Final round-robin standings

Key
Teams to Playoffs
Teams to Draw Shot Challenge (team with best moves to playoffs, other two play in qualification game)

Blue Group	W	L
Switzerland	7	0
Russia	5	2
Denmark	4	3
Slovakia	4	3
Canada	4	3
Norway	2	5
Italy	1	6
England	1	6

Red Group	W	L
Sweden	6	1
Japan	5	2
Finland	4	3
Hungary	4	3
Australia	3	4
New Zealand	3	4
Estonia	2	5
South Korea	1	6

White Group	W	L
France	6	1
United States	5	2
China	5	2
Czech Republic	4	3
Spain	4	3
Scotland	3	4
Austria	1	6
Latvia	0	7

== Round-robin results ==
All draw times are listed in Central Standard Time (UTC-06).

=== Blue group ===
==== Sunday, April 17 ====
Draw 1 11:30

Sheet G	1	2	3	4	5	6	7	8	Final
Canada	1	1	0	2	0	4	0	X	8
Denmark	0	0	3	0	1	0	2	X	6

Sheet H	1	2	3	4	5	6	7	8	Final
England	5	1	2	1	0	1	1	X	11
Italy	0	0	0	0	1	0	0	X	1

Draw 2 15:00

Sheet A	1	2	3	4	5	6	7	8	Final
Norway	0	1	0	0	0	2	0	X	3
Russia	5	0	1	2	1	0	2	X	11

Sheet B	1	2	3	4	5	6	7	8	Final
Switzerland	2	0	4	1	1	0	2	X	10
Slovakia	0	1	0	0	0	2	0	X	3

==== Monday, April 18 ====
Draw 4 08:00

Sheet A	1	2	3	4	5	6	7	8	Final
Denmark	0	5	2	1	0	3	0	X	11
Italy	3	0	0	0	1	0	2	X	6

Sheet B	1	2	3	4	5	6	7	8	Final
Canada	0	0	0	1	1	1	3	1	7
England	3	2	1	0	0	0	0	0	6

Sheet C	1	2	3	4	5	6	7	8	Final
Russia	0	0	3	0	0	0	0	X	3
Switzerland	0	1	0	2	1	1	2	X	7

Sheet D	1	2	3	4	5	6	7	8	Final
Norway	0	1	0	2	2	0	0	0	5
Slovakia	1	0	1	0	0	1	1	3	7

Draw 7 21:30

Sheet E	1	2	3	4	5	6	7	8	Final
Italy	2	0	3	2	2	0	0	X	9
Norway	0	1	0	0	0	2	1	X	4

Sheet F	1	2	3	4	5	6	7	8	Final
Denmark	0	3	0	1	0	0	0	1	5
Russia	1	0	3	0	1	1	2	0	8

Sheet G	1	2	3	4	5	6	7	8	Final
Slovakia	0	0	0	5	2	0	1	1	9
England	3	1	1	0	0	1	0	0	6

Sheet H	1	2	3	4	5	6	7	8	Final
Switzerland	0	1	1	1	0	2	2	X	7
Canada	1	0	0	0	1	0	0	X	2

==== Tuesday, April 19 ====
Draw 9 15:00

Sheet C	1	2	3	4	5	6	7	8	Final
Slovakia	0	0	1	0	1	0	4	1	7
Denmark	3	2	0	2	0	1	0	0	8

Sheet E	1	2	3	4	5	6	7	8	Final
England	0	1	0	3	0	2	0	X	6
Russia	1	0	0	0	3	0	1	X	11

Sheet F	1	2	3	4	5	6	7	8	Final
Canada	0	1	1	0	0	1	1	X	4
Norway	1	0	0	4	1	0	0	X	6

Sheet G	1	2	3	4	5	6	7	8	Final
Switzerland	1	0	1	0	1	1	1	3	8
Italy	0	1	0	1	0	0	0	0	2

==== Wednesday, April 20 ====
Draw 12 08:00

Sheet B	1	2	3	4	5	6	7	8	Final
Norway	0	0	0	2	0	0	X	X	2
Denmark	4	1	2	0	4	1	X	X	12

Draw 13 11:00

Sheet A	1	2	3	4	5	6	7	8	9	Final
Canada	0	0	2	0	0	2	1	2	0	7
Slovakia	4	1	0	1	1	0	0	0	1	8

Sheet B	1	2	3	4	5	6	7	8	Final
Italy	2	1	0	0	0	0	X	X	3
Russia	0	0	3	1	4	2	X	X	10

Draw 14 14:30

Sheet D	1	2	3	4	5	6	7	8	Final
England	0	2	0	0	0	0	X	X	2
Switzerland	2	0	2	3	1	1	X	X	9

==== Thursday, April 21 ====
Draw 17 08:00

Sheet C	1	2	3	4	5	6	7	8	Final
Italy	0	1	0	0	0	0	X	X	1
Canada	1	0	1	2	3	2	X	X	9

Draw 18 11:30

Sheet E	1	2	3	4	5	6	7	8	9	Final
Denmark	2	0	0	1	1	0	0	1	1	6
England	0	2	1	0	0	1	1	0	0	5

Sheet F	1	2	3	4	5	6	7	8	Final
Norway	0	0	0	0	2	0	X	X	2
Switzerland	2	1	2	1	0	2	X	X	8

Sheet H	1	2	3	4	5	6	7	8	Final
Russia	2	3	0	1	1	1	0	X	8
Slovakia	0	0	1	0	0	0	1	X	2

Draw 20 18:00

Sheet A	1	2	3	4	5	6	7	8	Final
Switzerland	3	1	0	0	0	4	0	X	8
Denmark	0	0	1	2	1	0	3	X	7

Sheet B	1	2	3	4	5	6	7	8	Final
Slovakia	3	0	4	0	0	1	1	0	9
Italy	0	3	0	1	1	0	0	1	6

Draw 21 21:30

Sheet B	1	2	3	4	5	6	7	8	Final
Russia	0	1	1	0	1	1	1	0	5
Canada	3	0	0	1	0	0	0	3	7

Sheet C	1	2	3	4	5	6	7	8	Final
England	0	0	0	1	2	1	0	0	4
Norway	1	1	1	0	0	0	1	2	6

=== Red group ===
==== Sunday, April 17 ====
Draw 2 15:00

Sheet E	1	2	3	4	5	6	7	8	Final
Australia	2	1	2	1	0	0	0	X	6
Estonia	0	0	0	0	2	1	1	X	4

Sheet F	1	2	3	4	5	6	7	8	9	Final
Finland	2	0	1	1	0	0	0	1	0	5
Hungary	0	1	0	0	1	1	2	0	1	6

Sheet G	1	2	3	4	5	6	7	8	Final
Japan	2	0	4	0	5	0	1	X	12
South Korea	0	1	0	1	0	1	0	X	3

Sheet H	1	2	3	4	5	6	7	8	Final
New Zealand	1	0	0	2	0	0	0	X	3
Sweden	0	2	2	0	1	1	1	X	7

==== Monday, April 18 ====
Draw 4 08:00

Sheet E	1	2	3	4	5	6	7	8	Final
South Korea	0	0	0	0	2	0	0	X	2
Sweden	2	2	2	2	0	1	1	X	10

Sheet F	1	2	3	4	5	6	7	8	Final
Japan	1	1	0	5	1	0	X	X	8
New Zealand	0	0	2	0	0	1	X	X	3

Sheet G	1	2	3	4	5	6	7	8	Final
Estonia	0	0	0	1	0	2	0	X	3
Hungary	1	1	1	0	2	0	3	X	8

Sheet H	1	2	3	4	5	6	7	8	Final
Australia	0	3	0	0	0	1	0	X	4
Finland	1	0	2	1	1	0	2	X	7

Draw 6 18:00

Sheet A	1	2	3	4	5	6	7	8	9	Final
Japan	1	0	1	0	2	1	1	0	0	6
Hungary	0	2	0	2	0	0	0	2	2	8

Draw 7 21:30

Sheet B	1	2	3	4	5	6	7	8	Final
Australia	1	0	2	0	0	0	0	X	3
Sweden	0	2	0	1	1	2	1	X	7

Sheet C	1	2	3	4	5	6	7	8	Final
Finland	0	1	0	1	3	0	5	X	10
New Zealand	1	0	1	0	0	3	0	X	5

Sheet D	1	2	3	4	5	6	7	8	Final
Estonia	0	0	1	0	1	0	0	0	2
South Korea	1	1	0	1	0	1	1	1	6

==== Tuesday, April 19 ====
Draw 8 11:30

Sheet C	1	2	3	4	5	6	7	8	Final
Hungary	2	0	1	0	1	0	1	X	5
Sweden	0	3	0	2	0	3	0	X	8

Draw 9 15:00

Sheet D	1	2	3	4	5	6	7	8	Final
Australia	2	0	1	0	0	2	0	0	5
Japan	0	1	0	2	1	0	2	1	7

Draw 10 18:00

Sheet A	1	2	3	4	5	6	7	8	Final
Finland	0	0	2	0	2	0	3	1	8
South Korea	1	1	0	3	0	1	0	0	6

Sheet B	1	2	3	4	5	6	7	8	Final
New Zealand	0	1	3	0	0	0	1	0	5
Estonia	1	0	0	1	1	2	0	1	6

==== Wednesday, April 20 ====
Draw 12 08:00

Sheet C	1	2	3	4	5	6	7	8	Final
Japan	2	0	1	1	3	2	X	X	9
Estonia	0	1	0	0	0	0	X	X	1

Sheet D	1	2	3	4	5	6	7	8	Final
Sweden	0	1	1	0	3	0	3	X	8
Finland	1	0	0	1	0	0	0	X	2

Sheet G	1	2	3	4	5	6	7	8	Final
New Zealand	3	0	0	1	2	0	1	X	7
Australia	0	1	1	0	0	1	0	X	3

Sheet H	1	2	3	4	5	6	7	8	Final
Hungary	1	0	4	0	4	0	0	X	9
South Korea	0	4	0	0	0	1	1	X	6

Draw 14 14:30

Sheet A	1	2	3	4	5	6	7	8	Final
Hungary	0	0	3	2	0	0	1	0	6
Australia	1	1	0	0	3	1	0	1	7

Sheet C	1	2	3	4	5	6	7	8	Final
Estonia	4	1	1	0	0	2	1	0	9
Finland	0	0	0	4	1	0	0	1	6

Draw 15 18:00

Sheet C	1	2	3	4	5	6	7	8	9	Final
Sweden	2	0	3	0	2	0	0	1	0	8
Japan	0	1	0	4	0	2	1	0	1	9

Draw 16 21:30

Sheet A	1	2	3	4	5	6	7	8	Final
South Korea	0	0	2	2	0	0	1	X	5
New Zealand	1	1	0	0	5	2	0	X	9

==== Thursday, April 21 ====
Draw 18 11:30

Sheet A	1	2	3	4	5	6	7	8	Final
Sweden	1	1	1	0	1	0	2	X	6
Estonia	0	0	0	2	0	1	0	X	3

Sheet C	1	2	3	4	5	6	7	8	Final
South Korea	0	0	4	0	2	0	1	0	7
Australia	2	2	0	1	0	2	0	1	8

Sheet D	1	2	3	4	5	6	7	8	Final
New Zealand	0	2	0	3	0	2	1	X	8
Hungary	1	0	1	0	1	0	0	X	3

Draw 19 14:30

Sheet B	1	2	3	4	5	6	7	8	Final
Finland	3	0	1	0	4	1	0	2	11
Japan	0	3	0	4	0	0	3	0	10

=== White group ===
==== Sunday, April 17 ====
Draw 2 15:00

Sheet C	1	2	3	4	5	6	7	8	Final
Latvia	0	0	3	0	0	1	1	X	5
Scotland	1	1	0	2	4	0	0	X	8

Sheet D	1	2	3	4	5	6	7	8	Final
Czech Republic	2	0	0	1	1	0	0	4	8
France	0	2	2	0	0	1	1	0	6

Draw 3 21:30

Sheet C	1	2	3	4	5	6	7	8	Final
Spain	0	1	0	1	0	0	1	X	3
United States	1	0	3	0	2	2	0	X	8

Sheet H	1	2	3	4	5	6	7	8	Final
Austria	0	0	1	0	0	1	1	X	3
China	1	1	0	2	1	0	0	X	5

==== Monday, April 18 ====
Draw 5 14:30

Sheet C	1	2	3	4	5	6	7	8	Final
France	1	1	1	1	0	2	0	2	8
China	0	0	0	0	2	0	1	0	3

Sheet G	1	2	3	4	5	6	7	8	Final
Latvia	0	0	0	0	1	1	0	X	2
Spain	2	2	1	2	0	0	2	X	9

Draw 6 18:00

Sheet B	1	2	3	4	5	6	7	8	Final
Scotland	2	0	0	3	2	0	1	0	8
United States	0	1	3	0	0	1	0	2	7

Sheet C	1	2	3	4	5	6	7	8	Final
Austria	0	2	0	0	1	0	0	X	3
Czech Republic	3	0	2	1	0	1	2	X	9

Draw 7 21:30

Sheet A	1	2	3	4	5	6	7	8	Final
France	0	0	1	0	2	2	1	0	6
Spain	1	1	0	1	0	0	0	2	5

==== Tuesday, April 19 ====
Draw 8 11:30

Sheet B	1	2	3	4	5	6	7	8	Final
Latvia	1	1	1	0	0	1	0	0	4
France	0	0	0	1	2	0	4	1	8

Draw 9 15:00

Sheet A	1	2	3	4	5	6	7	8	Final
Austria	1	0	1	1	0	0	0	X	3
United States	0	4	0	0	3	2	1	X	10

Sheet B	1	2	3	4	5	6	7	8	Final
China	0	1	0	1	1	2	0	2	7
Scotland	1	0	4	0	0	0	1	0	6

Sheet G	1	2	3	4	5	6	7	8	Final
Spain	0	2	3	0	0	0	4	0	9
Czech Republic	1	0	0	1	2	0	0	3	7

Draw 11 21:30

Sheet A	1	2	3	4	5	6	7	8	Final
Czech Republic	0	2	0	3	2	0	0	X	7
Scotland	1	0	1	0	0	2	1	X	5

==== Wednesday, April 20 ====
Draw 12 08:00

Sheet A	1	2	3	4	5	6	7	8	Final
Spain	0	2	1	0	0	2	0	0	5
China	1	0	0	1	2	0	2	2	9

Sheet E	1	2	3	4	5	6	7	8	Final
Latvia	2	0	0	1	0	2	0	2	7
Austria	0	2	1	0	1	0	4	0	8

Sheet F	1	2	3	4	5	6	7	8	9	Final
United States	1	0	2	0	1	0	1	0	0	5
France	0	2	0	1	0	1	0	1	1	6

Draw 15 18:00

Sheet A	1	2	3	4	5	6	7	8	Final
Scotland	1	0	0	4	0	0	0	1	6
France	0	1	1	0	2	3	1	0	8

Sheet B	1	2	3	4	5	6	7	8	Final
Austria	0	0	1	0	1	0	X	X	2
Spain	3	1	0	2	0	3	X	X	9

Draw 16 21:30

Sheet D	1	2	3	4	5	6	7	8	Final
China	3	1	0	2	1	0	1	X	8
Latvia	0	0	1	0	0	1	0	X	2

Sheet G	1	2	3	4	5	6	7	8	Final
Czech Republic	0	0	0	1	0	0	0	3	4
United States	2	1	1	0	4	1	1	0	10

==== Thursday, April 21 ====
Draw 17 08:00

Sheet A	1	2	3	4	5	6	7	8	Final
China	0	0	2	0	3	2	0	1	8
Czech Republic	2	1	0	1	0	0	2	0	6

Sheet B	1	2	3	4	5	6	7	8	Final
United States	1	0	0	4	0	2	3	X	10
Latvia	0	1	1	0	2	0	0	X	4

Draw 18 11:30

Sheet B	1	2	3	4	5	6	7	8	Final
France	0	3	2	0	1	0	3	0	9
Austria	2	0	0	1	0	3	0	2	8

Sheet G	1	2	3	4	5	6	7	8	Final
Spain	0	2	1	0	2	0	2	0	7
Scotland	2	0	0	2	0	1	0	1	6

Draw 19 14:30

Sheet C	1	2	3	4	5	6	7	8	Final
Czech Republic	2	1	1	3	0	3	X	X	10
Latvia	0	0	0	0	1	0	X	X	1

Sheet E	1	2	3	4	5	6	7	8	Final
United States	0	0	5	1	1	0	1	X	8
China	2	1	0	0	0	1	0	X	4

Draw 20 18:00

Sheet C	1	2	3	4	5	6	7	8	Final
Scotland	0	1	4	2	2	0	5	X	14
Austria	3	0	0	0	0	3	0	X	6

== Tiebreakers ==
Friday, April 22, 08:00

Sheet C	1	2	3	4	5	6	7	8	Final
Canada	2	1	1	0	3	0	0	X	7
Slovakia	0	0	0	2	0	1	1	X	4

Friday, April 22, 11:30

Sheet A	1	2	3	4	5	6	7	8	Final
Denmark	2	0	1	1	2	0	0	X	6
Canada	0	2	0	0	0	1	1	X	4

Sheet E	1	2	3	4	5	6	7	8	9	Final
Finland	2	0	3	1	0	0	2	0	1	9
Hungary	0	2	0	0	3	1	0	2	0	8

== Playoffs ==
Qualification Game
W3	China	9
B3	Finland	4

Quarterfinals
R1	Sweden	9
W3	China	3
R2	Japan	5
B2	Russia	8
W1	France	8
W2	United States	6
B1	Switzerland	10
B3	Denmark	9

Semifinals
R1	Sweden	7
B2	Russia	9
W1	France	3
B1	Switzerland	8

Gold Medal Match
B2	Russia	2
B1	Switzerland	11

Bronze Medal Match
R1	Sweden	6
W1	France	8

=== Qualification Game ===
Friday, April 22, 15:00

Sheet B	1	2	3	4	5	6	7	8	Final
China	2	0	2	0	0	2	1	2	9
Finland	0	1	0	2	1	0	0	0	4

=== Quarterfinals ===
Friday, April 22, 20:00

Sheet C	1	2	3	4	5	6	7	8	Final
Sweden	2	1	1	2	0	0	3	X	9
China	0	0	0	0	1	2	0	X	3

Sheet A	1	2	3	4	5	6	7	8	Final
Japan	2	0	1	0	1	0	1	X	5
Russia	0	2	0	2	0	4	0	X	8

Sheet B	1	2	3	4	5	6	7	8	Final
France	0	0	2	2	0	2	1	1	8
United States	1	2	0	0	3	0	0	0	6

Sheet D	1	2	3	4	5	6	7	8	Final
Switzerland	2	0	0	2	0	3	3	0	10
Denmark	0	3	2	0	2	0	0	2	9

=== Semifinals ===
Saturday, April 23, 9:00

Sheet F	1	2	3	4	5	6	7	8	9	Final
Sweden	2	0	0	4	0	1	0	0	0	7
Russia	0	1	1	0	2	0	1	2	2	9

Sheet E	1	2	3	4	5	6	7	8	Final
Switzerland	1	1	1	0	0	4	1	X	8
France	0	0	0	2	1	0	0	X	3

=== Bronze medal game ===
Saturday, April 23, 14:00

Sheet H	1	2	3	4	5	6	7	8	Final
Sweden	0	0	1	0	0	3	0	2	6
France	1	1	0	1	1	0	4	0	8

=== Gold medal game ===
Saturday, April 23, 14:00

Sheet G	1	2	3	4	5	6	7	8	Final
Russia	0	1	0	0	0	1	X	X	2
Switzerland	5	0	3	1	2	0	X	X	11

2011 World Mixed Doubles Curling Championship Winner
(Switzerland)
Switzerland
3rd title
