= Denise Pimpini =

Italian curler

- Curler
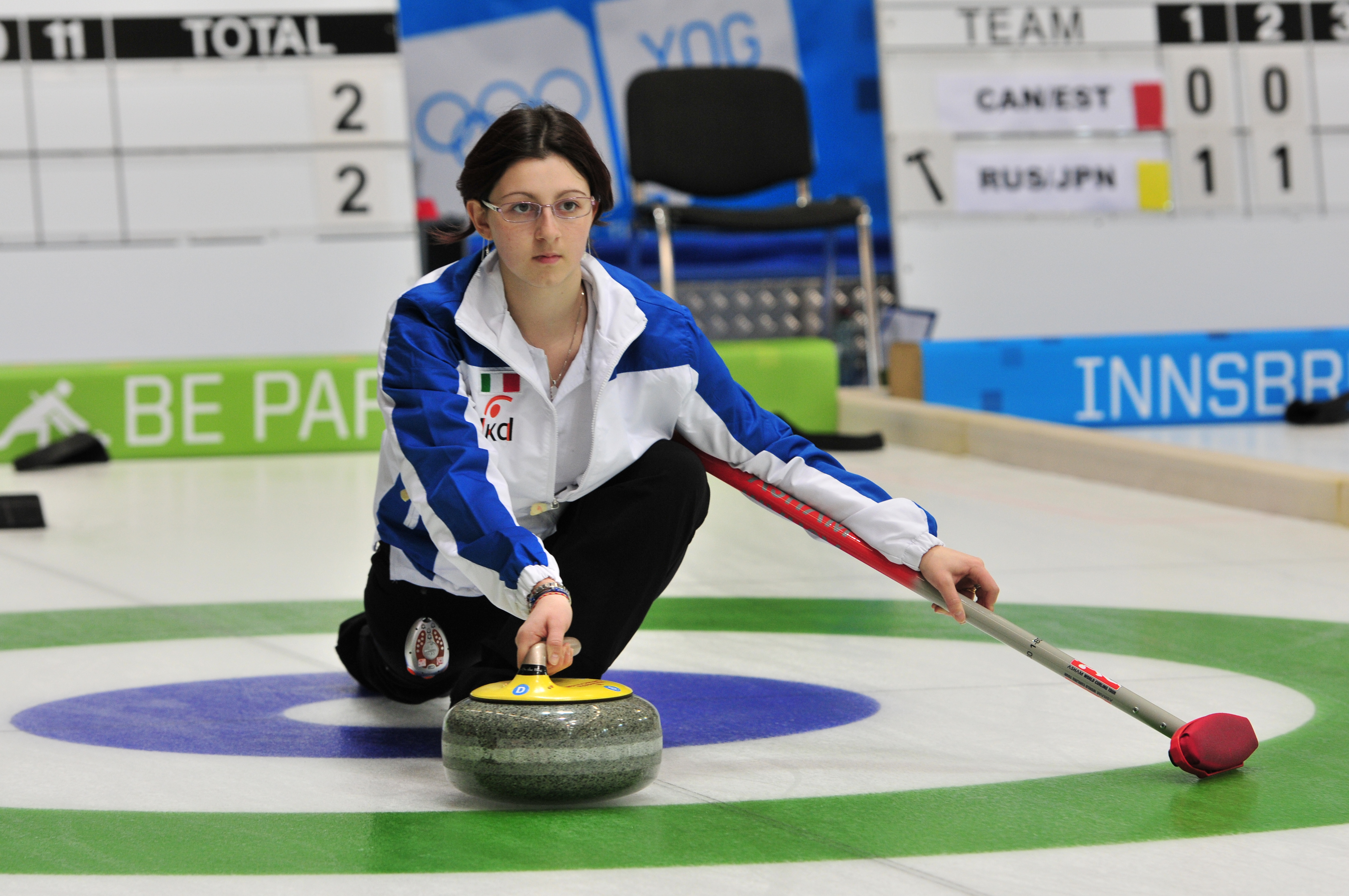
- Pimpini at the 2012 Youth Winter Olympics
- Born: 11 October 1995 (age 31)

Team
- Curling club: Draghi CC Torino a.s.d., Turin, ITA
- Skip: Diana Gaspari
- Third: Veronica Zappone
- Second: Denise Pimpini
- Lead: Arianna Losano
- Alternate: Chiara Olivieri

Curling career
- World Championship: 1 (2017)

Denise Pimpini (born 11 October 1995 in Rivoli, Piedmont, Italy) is an Italian curler.

Pimpini plays second for Diana Gaspari. The team qualified for the 2017 World Women's Curling Championship, finishing with a last-place 2-10 round robin record. Pimpini is right-handed.
