= Simone Gonin =

Italian curler (born 1989)

- Curler
- Born: 23 August 1989 (age 37); Savigliano, Italy

Team
- Curling club: SC Pinerolo; Pinerolo
- Mixed doubles partner: Giorgia Maurino

Curling career
- Member Association: Italy
- World Championship: 3 (2017, 2019, 2022)
- World Mixed Doubles Championship: 4 (2012, 2015, 2017, 2018)
- World Mixed Championship: 1 (2024)
- European Championship: 5 (2012, 2017, 2018, 2019, 2021)
- Olympic: 2 (2018, 2022)
Medal record
Men's curling
Representing Italy
World Men's Curling Championship
Bronze medal – third place	2022 Las Vegas
European Curling Championships
Bronze medal – third place	2018 Tallinn
Bronze medal – third place	2021 Lillehammer

Simone Gonin (born 23 August 1989) is an Italian curler from Pinerolo.

He represented Italy at the 2018 and 2022 Winter Olympics.

He was ejected from a game against the Czech Republic at the 2022 World Men's Curling Championship after smashing his broom. The head of the brush popped off, and landed on the adjacent sheet in front of U.S. skip Korey Dropkin while he was throwing. Gonin was apologetic when he retrieved his brush head, and Dropkin made his shot anyway. Despite the incident, Gonin was awarded the Collie Campbell Memorial Award for sportsmanship at the event. The Italian team also won the bronze medal that year, the first medal for Italy at the World Men's Championship.

== Personal life ==
Gonin is employed as a curling instructor and manager.
