= 2019 Italian Mixed Curling Championship =

- Host city: Pinerolo
- Dates: November 17–18, 2018; February 16–17, 2019; March 16–17, 2019
- Winner: Team Virtus Mixed
- Curling club: Virtus Piemonte Ghiaccio A.s.d.
- Skip: Stefano Perucca (2nd)
- Fourth: Alberto Pimpini
- Third: Barbara Gentile
- Lead: Amanda Bianchi
- Alternate: Giulia Mingozzi, Eugenio Molinatti
- Coach: Gianandrea Gallinatto
- Finalist: Magica Fireblock (Denise Pimpini)

The 2019 Italian Mixed Curling Championship (Italian: Campionato Mixed - Anno Sportivo 2018-2019) was held from November 17, 2018 to March 17, 2019 in two stages: the group stage (round robin) November 17–18, 2018 and February 16–17, 2019 and the playoff stage from March 16 to 17, 2019.

Four teams took part in the championship.

The winners of the championship were the team Team Virtus Mixed (skip Stefano Perucca), who won the team Magica Fireblock (skip Denise Pimpini) in the final. The bronze medal was won by the team Sporting Club Pinerolo (skip Lorenzo Maurino), who won the bronze match against the team Jass On The Rocks (skip Alberto Arienti).

== Teams ==
| Team | Skip | Third | Second | Lead | Alternate | Coach | Locale (curling club) |
|---|---|---|---|---|---|---|---|
| Jass On The Rocks | Alberto Arienti | Valentina Buitta | Antonio Francesco Bozzi | Donatella Bennigartner | Giacomo Mangili, Martina Erba | | A.s.d. Jass Curling Club |
| Magica Fireblock | Fabio Sola (4th) | Denise Pimpini (skip) | Julien Michele Genre | Emanuela Matino | Sara Aliberti, Simone Sola | | A.s.d. Fireblock |
| Sporting Club Pinerolo | Veronica Zappone (4th) | Lorenzo Maurino (skip) | Emanuela Cavallo | Davide Forchino | Anna Maria Maurino, Fabio Ribotta | Lucilla Macchiati | A.s.d. Sporting Club Pinerolo |
| Team Virtus Mixed | Alberto Pimpini (4th) | Barbara Gentile | Stefano Perucca (skip) | Amanda Bianchi | Giulia Mingozzi, Eugenio Molinatti | Gianandrea Gallinatto | Virtus Piemonte Ghiaccio A.s.d. |

== Round robin ==
(Qualificazione - Girone unico)
Was held in Pinerolo at November 17–18, 2018 and February 16–17, 2019

| | Team | A1 | A2 | A3 | A4 | Wins | Losses | DSC, cm | Place |
|---|---|---|---|---|---|---|---|---|---|
| A1 | Jass On The Rocks | * | 1:11; 4:8 | 2:10; 3:9 | 0:9; 4:9 | 0 | 6 | 319.9 | 4 |
| A2 | Magica Fireblock | 11:1; 8:4 | * | 7:6; 8:3 | 6:4; 6:1 | 6 | 0 | 168.6 | 1 |
| A3 | Sporting Club Pinerolo | 10:2; 9:3 | 6:7; 3:8 | * | 9:2; 5:4 | 4 | 2 | 137.8 | 2 |
| A4 | Team Virtus Mixed | 9:0; 9:4 | 4:6; 1:6 | 2:9; 4:5 | * | 2 | 4 | 206.9 | 3 |

== Playoffs ==
(Finale)
Was held in Pinerolo from March 16 to 17, 2019

Page playoffs
1 | Magica Fireblock | 5
2 | Sporting Club Pinerolo | 3
3 | Team Virtus Mixed | 19
4 | Jass On The Rocks | 0

Semifinal
Sporting Club Pinerolo | 5
Team Virtus Mixed | 7

Final
Magica Fireblock | 4
Team Virtus Mixed | 7

| Bronze-medal match |
| Sporting Club Pinerolo | 15 |
| Jass On The Rocks | 1 |

=== 1 vs. 2 ===
March 16, 15:00

| Sheet 2 | 1 | 2 | 3 | 4 | 5 | 6 | 7 | 8 | Final |
| Magica Fireblock | 1 | 1 | 0 | 0 | 1 | 1 | 1 | X | 5 |
| Sporting Club Pinerolo | 0 | 0 | 2 | 1 | 0 | 0 | 0 | X | 3 |

=== 3 vs. 4 ===
March 16, 15:00

| Sheet 3 | 1 | 2 | 3 | 4 | 5 | 6 | 7 | 8 | Final |
| Team Virtus Mixed | 2 | 3 | 3 | 4 | 5 | 2 | X | X | 19 |
| Jass On The Rocks | 0 | 0 | 0 | 0 | 0 | 0 | X | X | 0 |

=== Semifinal ===
March 16, 20:30

| Sheet 2 | 1 | 2 | 3 | 4 | 5 | 6 | 7 | 8 | Final |
| Sporting Club Pinerolo | 0 | 1 | 2 | 0 | 1 | 0 | 1 | 0 | 5 |
| Team Virtus Mixed | 2 | 0 | 0 | 3 | 0 | 1 | 0 | 1 | 7 |

=== Bronze-medal match ===
March 17, 10:30

| Sheet 3 | 1 | 2 | 3 | 4 | 5 | 6 | 7 | 8 | Final |
| Sporting Club Pinerolo | 4 | 5 | 0 | 2 | 1 | 3 | X | X | 15 |
| Jass On The Rocks | 0 | 0 | 1 | 0 | 0 | 0 | X | X | 1 |

=== Final ===
March 17, 10:30

| Sheet 2 | 1 | 2 | 3 | 4 | 5 | 6 | 7 | 8 | Final |
| Magica Fireblock | 1 | 0 | 0 | 1 | 0 | 1 | 1 | 0 | 4 |
| Team Virtus Mixed | 0 | 3 | 1 | 0 | 2 | 0 | 0 | 1 | 7 |

== Final standings ==
| Place | Team | Skip | Games | Wins | Losses |
|---|---|---|---|---|---|
| 1st place, gold medalist(s) | Team Virtus Mixed | Stefano Perucca | 9 | 5 | 4 |
| 2nd place, silver medalist(s) | Magica Fireblock | Denise Pimpini | 8 | 7 | 1 |
| 3rd place, bronze medalist(s) | Sporting Club Pinerolo | Lorenzo Maurino | 9 | 6 | 3 |
| 4 | Jass On The Rocks | Alberto Arienti | 8 | 0 | 8 |

== See also ==
- 2019 Italian Men's Curling Championship
- 2019 Italian Women's Curling Championship
- 2019 Italian Mixed Doubles Curling Championship
- 2019 Italian Junior Curling Championships
