= Alberto Pimpini =

Italian curler (born 1997)

- Curler
- Born: January 26, 1997 (age 29); Rivoli, Italy

Team
- Curling club: SC Pinerolo, Pinerolo; Aeronautica Militare
- Skip: Joël Retornaz
- Third: Stefano Gilli
- Second: Andrea Gilli
- Lead: Alberto Pimpini
- Mixed doubles partner: Rachele Scalesse

Curling career
- Member Association: Italy
- World Championship: 2 (2019, 2026)
- World Mixed Championship: 2 (2015, 2023)
- European Championship: 4 (2019, 2022, 2023, 2025)
- Olympic: 1 (2026)
Medal record
Men's curling
Representing Italy
European Curling Championships
Bronze medal – third place	2022 Östersund

Alberto Pimpini (born January 26, 1997, in Rivoli) is an Italian curler from Giaveno. He currently plays lead on Team Joël Retornaz.

At the national level, he is a 2019 Italian mixed champion, and a 2025 Italian Mixed Doubles champion. He also won his first men's event on the World Curling Tour at the 2025 Prague Open, winning over Switzerland's Felix Lüthold 8-1 in the final.

== Personal life ==
He started curling in 2007 at the age of 10.

== Teams ==
=== Men's ===
Season	Skip	Third	Second	Lead	Alternate	Coach	Events
2015–16	Amos Mosaner	Alessandro Zoppi	Alberto Pimpini	Eugenio Molinatti	Carlo Gottardi	Massimo Tortia	WJBCC 2016 (5th)
2016–17	Stefano Perucca	Alberto Pimpini	Simone Sola	Fabio Sola			
2018–19	Joël Retornaz	Amos Mosaner	Sebastiano Arman	Simone Gonin	Alberto Pimpini	Marco Mariani	WCC 2019 (7th)
2019–20	Joël Retornaz	Amos Mosaner	Sebastiano Arman	Simone Gonin	Alberto Pimpini	Claudio Pescia	ECC 2019 (5th)
2020–21	Alberto Pimpini (Fourth)	Mattia Giovanella	Luca Rizzolli (Skip)	Daniele Ferrazza			
2021–22	Mattia Giovanella (Fourth)	Alberto Pimpini	Daniele Ferrazza	Luca Rizzolli (Skip)			
2022–23	Fabio Ribotta	Alberto Pimpini	Fabrizio Gallo	Francesco Vigliani	Stefano Gilli		
2024–25	Alberto Pimpini	Simone Gonin	Fabrizio Gallo	Mario Rossi			
2025–26	Alberto Pimpini	Francesco Vigliani	Fabio Carlisano	Jacopo Scappin			
2026–27	Joël Retornaz	Stefano Gilli	Andrea Gilli	Alberto Pimpini			

=== Mixed ===
Season	Skip	Third	Second	Lead	Alternate	Coach	Events
2015–16	Fabio Sola (fourth)	Denise Pimpini (skip)	Alberto Pimpini	Sara Aliberti		Stefano Perucca	WMxCC 2015 (9th)
2018–19	Alberto Pimpini (fourth)	Barbara Gentile	Stefano Perucca (skip)	Amanda Bianchi	Giulia Mingozzi, Eugenio Molinatti	Gianandrea Gallinatto	IMxCC 2019 (gold)
