= 2022 European Curling Championships =

European curling tournament held in Sweden and Lithuania

2022 Le Gruyère AOP European Curling Championships
- Host city: Östersund, Sweden (A & B divisions); Kaunas, Lithuania (C division)
- Arena: Östersund Arena (A & B divisions); Kaunas Ice Palace (C division)
- Dates: November 18–26 (A & B divisions); April 25 – May 5 (C division)
- Men's winner: Scotland
- Curling club: Gogar Park CC, Edinburgh
- Skip: Bruce Mouat
- Third: Grant Hardie
- Second: Bobby Lammie
- Lead: Hammy McMillan Jr.
- Alternate: Kyle Waddell
- Coach: Michael Goodfellow
- Finalist: Switzerland (Schwaller)
- Women's winner: Denmark
- Curling club: Hvidovre CC, Hvidovre & Gentofte CC, Gentofte
- Skip: Madeleine Dupont
- Third: Mathilde Halse
- Second: Denise Dupont
- Lead: My Larsen
- Alternate: Jasmin Lander
- Coach: Ulrik Schmidt
- Finalist: Switzerland (Tirinzoni)

The 2022 Le Gruyère AOP European Curling Championships was held in May and November 2022, to qualify European curling teams for the 2023 World Curling Championships. The A and B division competitions were held from November 18 to 26 at the Östersund Arena in Östersund, Sweden. The C division competition was held from April 30 to May 5 at the Kaunas Ice Palace in Kaunas, Lithuania.

The top eight men's and women's team qualified for the 2023 World Men's Curling Championship and the 2023 World Women's Curling Championship respectively. Sweden, the host of the women's world championship, automatically qualified as one of the eight European entrants. Because of the inaugural Pan Continental Curling Championships, the European Championship have a set number of qualifiers for the World Championships for the first time. As a result, the World Qualification Event has been discontinued.

== Medalists ==
A Division	Gold	Silver	Bronze
Men	Scotland; Bruce Mouat; Grant Hardie; Bobby Lammie; Hammy McMillan Jr. Kyle Waddell	Switzerland; Benoît Schwarz (Fourth); Yannick Schwaller (Skip); Sven Michel; Pablo Lachat	Italy; Joël Retornaz; Amos Mosaner; Sebastiano Arman; Mattia Giovanella; Alberto Pimpini
Women	Denmark; Madeleine Dupont; Mathilde Halse; Denise Dupont; My Larsen; Jasmin Lander	Switzerland; Alina Pätz (Fourth); Silvana Tirinzoni (Skip); Carole Howald; Briar Schwaller-Hürlimann; Anna Gut	Scotland; Rebecca Morrison; Gina Aitken; Sophie Sinclair; Sophie Jackson; Hailey Duff

== Men ==
=== A division ===
==== Qualification ====
The following nations qualified to participate in the 2022 European Curling Championship:

A Division Teams

Event	Vacancies	Qualified
2021 European Curling Championships A Division	8	Scotland; Sweden; Italy; Norway; Switzerland; Denmark; Czech Republic; Germany
2021 European Curling Championships B Division	2	Turkey; ~~Russia~~; Spain
TOTAL	10	

===== Russian participation =====
As part of international sports' reaction to the Russian invasion of Ukraine, on September 23, the World Curling Federation made the decision to remove Russian and Belarusian teams from the 2022 European Curling Championships. Because the Russian men's team qualified for the 2022 A Division through the 2021 B Division, their spot was filled by the next placing team in the 2021 B Division, which was Spain.

==== Teams ====
The teams are listed as follows:

Czech Republic	Denmark	Germany	Italy	Norway
Skip: Lukáš Klíma; Third: Marek Černovský; Second: Radek Boháč; Lead: Lukáš Klípa; Alternate: Martin Jurík	Skip: Mikkel Krause; Third: Mads Nørgaard; Second: Tobias Thune; Lead: Henrik Holtermann; Alternate: Oliver Rosenkrands Søe	Skip: Sixten Totzek; Third: Klaudius Harsch; Second: Magnus Sutor; Lead: Dominik Greindl; Alternate: Joshua Sutor	Skip: Joël Retornaz; Third: Amos Mosaner; Second: Sebastiano Arman; Lead: Mattia Giovanella; Alternate: Alberto Pimpini	Skip: Steffen Walstad; Third: Magnus Nedregotten; Second: Mathias Brænden; Lead: Magnus Vågberg; Alternate: Andreas Hårstad
Scotland	Spain	Sweden	Switzerland	Turkey
Skip: Bruce Mouat; Third: Grant Hardie; Second: Bobby Lammie; Lead: Hammy McMillan Jr. Alternate: Kyle Waddell	Skip: Sergio Vez; Third: Mikel Unanue; Second: Eduardo de Paz; Lead: Nicholas Shaw; Alternate: Luis Gómez	Skip: Oskar Eriksson; Third: Rasmus Wranå; Second: Daniel Magnusson; Lead: Christoffer Sundgren; Alternate: Simon Olofsson	Fourth: Benoît Schwarz; Skip: Yannick Schwaller; Second: Sven Michel; Lead: Pablo Lachat	Skip: Uğurcan Karagöz; Third: Muhammet Haydar Demirel; Second: Muhammed Zeki Uçan; Lead: Orhun Yüce; Alternate: Faruk Kavaz

==== Round robin standings ====
Final Round Robin Standings

Key
Teams to Playoffs and Qualified for the 2023 World Men's Curling Championship
Teams Qualified for the 2023 World Men's Curling Championship
Teams Relegated to 2023 B Division

Country	Skip	W	L	W–L	PF	PA	EW	EL	BE	SE	S%	DSC
Switzerland	Yannick Schwaller	8	1	1–1	65	36	37	26	7	9	86.9%	19.00
Scotland	Bruce Mouat	8	1	1–1	69	42	38	31	5	7	83.5%	21.48
Italy	Joël Retornaz	8	1	1–1	68	44	42	31	3	14	86.4%	21.67
Sweden	Oskar Eriksson	6	3	–	72	47	40	31	8	7	85.9%	18.11
Norway	Steffen Walstad	4	5	1–0	51	57	34	36	1	10	81.2%	25.41
Turkey	Uğurcan Karagöz	4	5	0–1	49	65	34	37	3	12	73.1%	30.16
Czech Republic	Lukáš Klíma	3	6	1–0	51	62	32	36	2	5	79.3%	30.50
Germany	Sixten Totzek	3	6	0–1	52	67	33	40	7	4	75.9%	30.79
Spain	Sergio Vez	1	8	–	48	72	35	41	3	8	75.1%	47.08
Denmark	Mikkel Krause	0	9	–	39	72	25	41	9	2	74.7%	38.96

Round Robin Summary Table
Pos.	Country	Czech Republic	Denmark	Germany	Italy	Norway	Scotland	Spain	Sweden	Switzerland	Turkey	Record
7	Czech Republic	—	10–4	8–4	4–7	3–10	6–11	10–4	2–8	3–7	5–7	3–6
10	Denmark	4–10	—	9–10	2–8	6–9	4–7	7–8	3–9	3–5	1–6	0–9
8	Germany	4–8	10–9	—	5–6	9–5	4–6	8–6	3–8	5–8	4–11	3–6
3	Italy	7–4	8–2	6–5	—	8–3	5–7	9–5	8–7	8–7	9–4	8–1
5	Norway	10–3	9–6	5–9	3–8	—	1–8	5–4	5–6	3–7	10–6	4–5
2	Scotland	11–6	7–4	6–4	7–5	8–1	—	10–4	8–7	2–7	10–4	8–1
9	Spain	4–10	8–7	6–8	5–9	4–5	4–10	—	9–11	3–6	5–6	1–8
4	Sweden	8–2	9–3	8–3	7–8	6–5	7–8	11–9	—	6–7	10–2	6–3
1	Switzerland	7–3	5–3	8–5	7–8	7–3	7–2	6–3	7–6	—	11–3	8–1
6	Turkey	7–5	6–1	11–4	4–9	6–10	4–10	6–5	2–10	3–11	—	4–5

==== Round robin results ====
All draw times are listed in Eastern European Time (UTC+03:00).

===== Draw 1 =====
Saturday, November 19, 9:00

Sheet A	1	2	3	4	5	6	7	8	9	10	11	Final
Spain (Vez) 🔨	1	0	1	0	0	1	1	0	1	0	0	5
Turkey (Karagöz)	0	1	0	2	1	0	0	0	0	1	1	6

Sheet B	1	2	3	4	5	6	7	8	9	10	Final
Italy (Retornaz)	0	2	2	2	0	0	0	2	X	X	8
Norway (Walstad) 🔨	1	0	0	0	1	0	1	0	X	X	3

Sheet C	1	2	3	4	5	6	7	8	9	10	Final
Sweden (Eriksson) 🔨	2	0	0	3	0	4	0	X	X	X	9
Denmark (Krause)	0	1	0	0	1	0	1	X	X	X	3

Sheet D	1	2	3	4	5	6	7	8	9	10	Final
Switzerland (Schwaller) 🔨	1	1	0	3	0	2	0	X	X	X	7
Czech Republic (Klíma)	0	0	1	0	1	0	1	X	X	X	3

Sheet E	1	2	3	4	5	6	7	8	9	10	11	Final
Scotland (Mouat) 🔨	0	1	0	0	1	0	1	0	1	0	2	6
Germany (Totzek)	0	0	1	0	0	1	0	1	0	1	0	4

===== Draw 2 =====
Saturday, November 19, 19:00

Sheet A	1	2	3	4	5	6	7	8	9	10	Final
Norway (Walstad) 🔨	0	1	0	0	2	0	0	0	0	X	3
Switzerland (Schwaller)	0	0	0	1	0	2	1	2	1	X	7

Sheet B	1	2	3	4	5	6	7	8	9	10	Final
Turkey (Karagöz)	1	0	1	1	2	0	0	1	0	1	7
Czech Republic (Klíma) 🔨	0	1	0	0	0	2	0	0	2	0	5

Sheet C	1	2	3	4	5	6	7	8	9	10	Final
Scotland (Mouat) 🔨	2	0	0	4	1	0	0	3	X	X	10
Spain (Vez)	0	1	1	0	0	2	0	0	X	X	4

Sheet D	1	2	3	4	5	6	7	8	9	10	11	Final
Germany (Totzek) 🔨	4	0	0	2	0	0	2	0	0	1	1	10
Denmark (Krause)	0	3	4	0	0	1	0	1	0	0	0	9

Sheet E	1	2	3	4	5	6	7	8	9	10	Final
Italy (Retornaz)	1	0	2	1	0	2	0	1	0	1	8
Sweden (Eriksson) 🔨	0	1	0	0	2	0	1	0	3	0	7

===== Draw 3 =====
Sunday, November 20, 14:00

Sheet A	1	2	3	4	5	6	7	8	9	10	Final
Denmark (Krause) 🔨	0	1	0	0	0	0	1	X	X	X	2
Italy (Retornaz)	2	0	3	0	3	0	0	X	X	X	8

Sheet B	1	2	3	4	5	6	7	8	9	10	Final
Spain (Vez)	0	0	2	0	1	0	2	1	0	0	6
Germany (Totzek) 🔨	0	2	0	1	0	2	0	0	2	1	8

Sheet C	1	2	3	4	5	6	7	8	9	10	Final
Turkey (Karagöz)	0	0	2	0	0	1	0	0	X	X	3
Switzerland (Schwaller) 🔨	2	0	0	1	1	0	3	4	X	X	11

Sheet D	1	2	3	4	5	6	7	8	9	10	Final
Sweden (Eriksson) 🔨	2	0	0	1	0	1	0	1	2	0	7
Scotland (Mouat)	0	2	1	0	1	0	3	0	0	1	8

Sheet E	1	2	3	4	5	6	7	8	9	10	Final
Norway (Walstad)	3	1	3	3	0	0	X	X	X	X	10
Czech Republic (Klíma)	0	0	0	0	1	2	X	X	X	X	3

===== Draw 4 =====
Monday, November 21, 8:00

Sheet A	1	2	3	4	5	6	7	8	9	10	Final
Czech Republic (Klíma)	0	1	0	3	0	1	0	1	0	X	6
Scotland (Mouat) 🔨	1	0	4	0	1	0	2	0	3	X	11

Sheet B	1	2	3	4	5	6	7	8	9	10	Final
Sweden (Eriksson) 🔨	0	1	0	0	1	0	1	0	2	1	6
Switzerland (Schwaller)	1	0	1	0	0	3	0	2	0	0	7

Sheet C	1	2	3	4	5	6	7	8	9	10	Final
Germany (Totzek) 🔨	0	4	0	2	0	0	1	0	0	2	9
Norway (Walstad)	0	0	1	0	1	1	0	1	1	0	5

Sheet D	1	2	3	4	5	6	7	8	9	10	Final
Denmark (Krause) 🔨	0	3	0	1	0	3	0	0	0	0	7
Spain (Vez)	0	0	1	0	2	0	2	1	1	1	8

Sheet E	1	2	3	4	5	6	7	8	9	10	Final
Turkey (Karagöz) 🔨	2	0	1	0	0	1	0	0	X	X	4
Italy (Retornaz)	0	1	0	3	2	0	1	2	X	X	9

===== Draw 5 =====
Monday, November 21, 16:00

Sheet A	1	2	3	4	5	6	7	8	9	10	Final
Sweden (Eriksson) 🔨	1	0	1	0	2	1	0	0	0	1	6
Norway (Walstad)	0	1	0	2	0	0	2	0	0	0	5

Sheet B	1	2	3	4	5	6	7	8	9	10	Final
Scotland (Mouat) 🔨	2	0	3	0	2	0	3	X	X	X	10
Turkey (Karagöz)	0	1	0	1	0	2	0	X	X	X	4

Sheet C	1	2	3	4	5	6	7	8	9	10	Final
Spain (Vez)	0	0	1	0	1	0	2	0	X	X	4
Czech Republic (Klíma) 🔨	0	3	0	3	0	2	0	2	X	X	10

Sheet D	1	2	3	4	5	6	7	8	9	10	Final
Italy (Retornaz) 🔨	1	1	0	1	0	2	0	1	0	0	6
Germany (Totzek)	0	0	1	0	2	0	0	0	1	1	5

Sheet E	1	2	3	4	5	6	7	8	9	10	Final
Switzerland (Schwaller) 🔨	0	2	0	1	0	0	0	2	0	X	5
Denmark (Krause)	0	0	2	0	0	0	1	0	0	X	3

===== Draw 6 =====
Tuesday, November 22, 9:00

Sheet A	1	2	3	4	5	6	7	8	9	10	Final
Scotland (Mouat)	0	2	0	2	0	0	0	2	1	X	7
Denmark (Krause) 🔨	1	0	1	0	1	1	0	0	0	X	4

Sheet B	1	2	3	4	5	6	7	8	9	10	Final
Norway (Walstad) 🔨	2	0	0	1	0	0	0	1	0	1	5
Spain (Vez)	0	0	1	0	0	1	1	0	1	0	4

Sheet C	1	2	3	4	5	6	7	8	9	10	Final
Switzerland (Schwaller)	1	0	2	0	2	0	0	1	0	1	7
Italy (Retornaz) 🔨	0	3	0	2	0	2	0	0	1	0	8

Sheet D	1	2	3	4	5	6	7	8	9	10	Final
Czech Republic (Klíma)	0	0	1	0	0	1	0	0	X	X	2
Sweden (Eriksson) 🔨	0	1	0	0	2	0	2	3	X	X	8

Sheet E	1	2	3	4	5	6	7	8	9	10	Final
Germany (Totzek)	1	0	1	0	0	2	0	0	X	X	4
Turkey (Karagöz) 🔨	0	1	0	4	2	0	2	2	X	X	11

===== Draw 7 =====
Tuesday, November 22, 19:00

Sheet A	1	2	3	4	5	6	7	8	9	10	Final
Italy (Retornaz)	0	1	0	2	0	1	2	0	1	X	7
Czech Republic (Klíma) 🔨	2	0	1	0	1	0	0	0	0	X	4

Sheet B	1	2	3	4	5	6	7	8	9	10	Final
Germany (Totzek)	0	0	1	0	0	0	2	0	X	X	3
Sweden (Eriksson) 🔨	1	0	0	0	2	2	0	3	X	X	8

Sheet C	1	2	3	4	5	6	7	8	9	10	Final
Denmark (Krause) 🔨	0	0	0	0	0	0	0	1	X	X	1
Turkey (Karagöz)	1	0	2	0	1	1	1	0	X	X	6

Sheet D	1	2	3	4	5	6	7	8	9	10	Final
Scotland (Mouat) 🔨	2	1	1	2	0	2	X	X	X	X	8
Norway (Walstad)	0	0	0	0	1	0	X	X	X	X	1

Sheet E	1	2	3	4	5	6	7	8	9	10	Final
Spain (Vez)	0	0	1	0	1	0	0	1	0	0	3
Switzerland (Schwaller) 🔨	1	1	0	1	0	0	2	0	0	1	6

===== Draw 8 =====
Wednesday, November 23, 14:00

Sheet A	1	2	3	4	5	6	7	8	9	10	Final
Turkey (Karagöz)	0	0	1	0	0	1	0	X	X	X	2
Sweden (Eriksson) 🔨	3	1	0	2	1	0	3	X	X	X	10

Sheet B	1	2	3	4	5	6	7	8	9	10	Final
Switzerland (Schwaller) 🔨	0	2	0	0	2	0	3	X	X	X	7
Scotland (Mouat)	0	0	0	1	0	1	0	X	X	X	2

Sheet C	1	2	3	4	5	6	7	8	9	10	Final
Czech Republic (Klíma) 🔨	1	0	0	2	0	3	0	1	1	X	8
Germany (Totzek)	0	0	2	0	1	0	1	0	0	X	4

Sheet D	1	2	3	4	5	6	7	8	9	10	Final
Spain (Vez)	0	0	2	0	2	0	0	1	0	X	5
Italy (Retornaz) 🔨	2	1	0	1	0	2	2	0	1	X	9

Sheet E	1	2	3	4	5	6	7	8	9	10	Final
Denmark (Krause) 🔨	1	0	0	2	0	1	0	2	0	0	6
Norway (Walstad)	0	1	3	0	1	0	1	0	2	1	9

===== Draw 9 =====
Thursday, November 24, 8:00

Sheet A	1	2	3	4	5	6	7	8	9	10	Final
Switzerland (Schwaller) 🔨	2	0	3	0	0	3	0	0	X	X	8
Germany (Totzek)	0	2	0	1	0	0	0	2	X	X	5

Sheet B	1	2	3	4	5	6	7	8	9	10	Final
Czech Republic (Klíma) 🔨	1	1	0	2	1	0	3	2	X	X	10
Denmark (Krause)	0	0	3	0	0	1	0	0	X	X	4

Sheet C	1	2	3	4	5	6	7	8	9	10	Final
Italy (Retornaz) 🔨	0	0	0	1	0	2	1	0	1	0	5
Scotland (Mouat)	0	0	1	0	2	0	0	2	0	2	7

Sheet D	1	2	3	4	5	6	7	8	9	10	Final
Norway (Walstad) 🔨	2	0	2	1	0	2	1	0	2	X	10
Turkey (Karagöz)	0	2	0	0	1	0	0	3	0	X	6

Sheet E	1	2	3	4	5	6	7	8	9	10	11	Final
Sweden (Eriksson) 🔨	2	0	0	2	0	2	0	0	3	0	2	11
Spain (Vez)	0	2	0	0	4	0	0	1	0	2	0	9

==== Playoffs ====
Semifinals
1	Switzerland	6
4	Sweden	3
2	Scotland	7
3	Italy	4

Gold medal game
1	Switzerland	4
2	Scotland	5
Bronze medal game
4	Sweden	7
3	Italy	10

===== Semifinal 1 =====
Thursday, November 24, 20:00

Sheet C	1	2	3	4	5	6	7	8	9	10	Final
Scotland (Mouat) 🔨	1	0	0	1	0	1	0	4	0	X	7
Italy (Retornaz)	0	0	1	0	0	0	2	0	1	X	4

Player percentages
Scotland		Italy	
Hammy McMillan Jr.	90%	Mattia Giovanella	92%
Bobby Lammie	75%	Sebastiano Arman	83%
Grant Hardie	74%	Amos Mosaner	90%
Bruce Mouat	89%	Joël Retornaz	76%
Total	82%	Total	85%

===== Semifinal 2 =====
Friday, November 25, 9:00

Sheet C	1	2	3	4	5	6	7	8	9	10	Final
Switzerland (Schwaller) 🔨	1	1	0	0	1	0	2	1	0	X	6
Sweden (Eriksson)	0	0	2	1	0	0	0	0	0	X	3

Player percentages
Switzerland		Sweden	
Pablo Lachat	83%	Christoffer Sundgren	95%
Sven Michel	91%	Daniel Magnusson	85%
Yannick Schwaller	84%	Rasmus Wranå	84%
Benoît Schwarz	84%	Oskar Eriksson	81%
Total	85%	Total	86%

===== Bronze medal game =====
Friday, November 25, 19:00

Sheet C	1	2	3	4	5	6	7	8	9	10	Final
Sweden (Eriksson)	0	1	0	2	0	2	0	2	0	0	7
Italy (Retornaz) 🔨	3	0	1	0	2	0	1	0	2	1	10

Player percentages
Sweden		Italy	
Christoffer Sundgren	95%	Mattia Giovanella	92%
Daniel Magnusson	84%	Sebastiano Arman	86%
Rasmus Wranå	79%	Amos Mosaner	78%
Oskar Eriksson	76%	Joël Retornaz	80%
Total	83%	Total	84%

===== Gold medal game =====
Saturday, November 26, 13:00

Sheet C	1	2	3	4	5	6	7	8	9	10	Final
Switzerland (Schwaller) 🔨	0	1	0	0	1	0	0	1	1	0	4
Scotland (Mouat)	0	0	0	2	0	1	0	0	0	2	5

Player percentages
Switzerland		Scotland	
Pablo Lachat	85%	Hammy McMillan Jr.	84%
Sven Michel	88%	Bobby Lammie	74%
Yannick Schwaller	84%	Grant Hardie	88%
Benoît Schwarz	86%	Bruce Mouat	88%
Total	86%	Total	83%

==== Player percentages ====
Round Robin only

Leads	%
(Sweden) Christoffer Sundgren	92.5
(Italy) Mattia Giovanella	91.2
(Norway) Magnus Vågberg	91.0
(Switzerland) Pablo Lachat	87.7
(Scotland) Hammy McMillan Jr.	87.2

Seconds	%
(Italy) Sebastiano Arman	87.3
(Switzerland) Sven Michel	86.3
(Sweden) Daniel Magnusson	81.9
(Norway) Mathias Brænden	80.3
(Scotland) Bobby Lammie	79.7

Thirds	%
(Switzerland) Yannick Schwaller (Skip)	86.8
(Sweden) Rasmus Wranå	85.2
(Scotland) Grant Hardie	82.1
(Italy) Amos Mosaner	81.1
(Czech Republic) Marek Černovský	80.6

Skips	%
(Switzerland) Benoît Schwarz (Fourth)	86.6
(Italy) Joël Retornaz	86.3
(Sweden) Oskar Eriksson	84.7
(Scotland) Bruce Mouat	84.5
(Norway) Steffen Walstad	75.6

==== Final standings ====
Key
Teams Advance to the 2023 World Men's Curling Championship
Teams Relegated to 2023 B Division

Place	Team
1st place, gold medalist(s)	Scotland
2nd place, silver medalist(s)	Switzerland
3rd place, bronze medalist(s)	Italy
4	Sweden
5	Norway
6	Turkey
7	Czech Republic
8	Germany
9	Spain
10	Denmark

=== B division ===
==== Teams ====
The teams are listed as follows:

Austria	Belgium	England	Estonia
Skip: Mathias Genner; Third: Jonas Backofen; Second: Martin Reichel; Lead: Florian Mavec; Alternate: Philipp Nothegger	Fourth: Jeroen Spruyt; Skip: Timothy Verreycken; Second: Bram Van Looy; Lead: Daan Yskout; Alternate: Tuur Vermeiren	Skip: Andrew Woolston; Third: Andrew Reed; Second: Scott Gibson; Lead: James Whittle; Alternate: Martin Gregory	Fourth: Mihhail Vlassov; Skip: Eduard Veltsman; Second: Janis Kiziridi; Lead: Igor Dzenzeljuk; Alternate: Konstantin Dotsenko
Finland	France	Hungary	Ireland
Skip: Kalle Kiiskinen; Third: Teemu Salo; Second: Jermu Pöllänen; Lead: Paavo Kuosmanen; Alternate: Jouni Mikkonen	Fourth: Quentin Morard; Skip: Eddy Mercier; Second: Yannick Valvassori; Lead: Killian Gaudin	Fourth: Zsolt Kiss; Skip: Kristóf Czermann; Second: Dávid Balázs; Lead: Callum Macfarlane; Alternate: Ottó Kalocsay	Skip: John Wilson; Third: Kyle Paradis; Second: James Russell; Lead: Craig Whyte; Alternate: Eoin Mccrossan
Latvia	Lithuania	Netherlands	Portugal
Skip: Mārtiņš Trukšāns; Third: Jānis Klīve; Second: Arnis Veidemanis; Lead: Sandris Buholcs; Alternate: Aivars Avotiņš	Skip: Konstantin Rykov; Third: Paulius Rymeikis; Second: Vytis Kulakauskas; Lead: Donatas Kiudys; Alternate: Matas Junevičius	Skip: Wouter Gösgens; Third: Jaap van Dorp; Second: Laurens Hoekman; Lead: Tobias van den Hurk; Alternate: Alexander Magan	Skip: Steve Seixeiro; Third: Chris Ribau; Second: José Ribau; Lead: Victor Santos; Alternate: Ramiro Santos
Slovakia	Slovenia	Ukraine	Wales
Fourth: Patrik Kaprálik; Third: Jakub Polák; Skip: Juraj Gallo; Lead: Milan Moravčík; Alternate: Jakub Červenka	Skip: Štefan Sever; Third: Marko Harb; Second: Simon Langus; Lead: Žiga Babič; Alternate: Martin Razinger	Skip: Eduard Nikolov; Third: Yaroslav Shchur; Second: Mykyta Velychko; Lead: Artem Suhak	Skip: James Pougher; Third: Rhys Phillips; Second: Garry Coombs; Lead: Simon Pougher

==== Round robin standings ====
Final Round Robin Standings

Key
Teams to Playoffs
Teams to Relegation Playoff

Group A	Skip	W	L	W–L	DSC
Finland	Kalle Kiiskinen	6	1	–	38.73
Wales	James Pougher	4	3	2–0	60.36
Ireland	John Wilson	4	3	1–1	59.50
England	Andrew Woolston	4	3	0–2	60.52
Slovakia	Juraj Gallo	3	4	2–0	40.33
Lithuania	Konstantin Rykov	3	4	1–1	80.21
Ukraine	Eduard Nikolov	3	4	0–2	69.00
Estonia	Eduard Veltsman	1	6	–	65.28

Group B	Skip	W	L	W–L	DSC
Netherlands	Wouter Gösgens	6	1	1–0	36.63
France	Eddy Mercier	6	1	0–1	62.18
Latvia	Mārtiņš Trukšāns	5	2	–	58.88
Austria	Mathias Genner	3	4	1–0	55.73
Hungary	Kristóf Czermann	3	4	0–1	71.77
Portugal	Steve Seixeiro	2	5	1–0	134.62
Belgium	Timothy Verreycken	2	5	0–1	50.94
Slovenia	Štefan Sever	1	6	–	79.39

Group A Round Robin Summary Table
Pos.	Country	England	Estonia	Finland		Lithuania	Slovakia	Ukraine	Wales	Record
4	England	—	8–7	4–10	9–10	8–6	6–4	10–5	7–9	4–3
8	Estonia	7–8	—	4–11	6–16	5–9	6–4	6–10	2–6	1–6
1	Finland	10–4	11–4	—	11–2	7–3	6–3	7–4	7–8	6–1
3	Ireland	10–9	16–6	2–11	—	11–6	13–5	5–6	5–7	4–3
6	Lithuania	6–8	9–5	3–7	6–11	—	6–12	5–3	6–5	3–4
5	Slovakia	4–6	4–6	3–6	5–13	12–6	—	7–6	10–9	3–4
7	Ukraine	5–10	10–6	4–7	6–5	3–5	6–7	—	8–7	3–4
2	Wales	9–7	6–2	8–7	7–5	5–6	9–10	7–8	—	4–3

Group B Round Robin Summary Table
Pos.	Country	Austria	Belgium	France	Hungary	Latvia	Netherlands	Portugal	Slovenia	Record
4	Austria	—	3–10	6–8	9–1	7–12	2–9	7–4	9–4	3–4
7	Belgium	10–3	—	3–6	6–9	2–9	5–12	6–7	9–8	2–5
2	France	8–6	6–3	—	8–2	6–4	4–11	10–4	8–4	6–1
5	Hungary	1–9	9–6	2–8	—	5–12	1–7	11–3	9–4	3–4
3	Latvia	12–7	9–2	4–6	12–5	—	7–6	10–8	5–8	5–2
1	Netherlands	9–2	12–5	11–4	7–1	6–7	—	8–2	10–4	6–1
6	Portugal	4–7	7–6	4–10	3–11	8–10	2–8	—	7–5	2–5
8	Slovenia	4–9	8–9	4–8	4–9	8–5	4–10	5–7	—	1–6

==== Relegation round ====
Relegation Semifinals
A7	Ukraine	2
B7	Belgium	10
A8	Estonia	5
B8	Slovenia	4

Relegation Final
A7	Ukraine	5
A8	Estonia	6

Remain in B Division
Belgium
Estonia
Relegated to C Division
Ukraine
Slovenia

===== Semifinals =====
Friday, November 25, 13:00

Sheet D	1	2	3	4	5	6	7	8	9	10	Final
Ukraine (Nikolov)	0	0	1	0	1	0	X	X	X	X	2
Belgium (Verreycken) 🔨	0	3	0	6	0	1	X	X	X	X	10

Sheet E	1	2	3	4	5	6	7	8	9	10	11	Final
Estonia (Veltsman) 🔨	0	2	0	0	0	0	0	0	2	0	1	5
Slovenia (Sever)	0	0	0	1	0	0	0	2	0	1	0	4

===== Final =====
Friday, November 25, 19:30

Sheet F	1	2	3	4	5	6	7	8	9	10	11	Final
Ukraine (Nikolov) 🔨	0	1	0	0	1	0	1	0	1	1	0	5
Estonia (Veltsman)	0	0	1	0	0	2	0	2	0	0	1	6

==== Playoffs ====
Qualification games
B2	France	6
A3	Ireland	5
A2	Wales	8
B3	Latvia	12

Semifinals
A1	Finland	6
B2	France	3
B1	Netherlands	13
B3	Latvia	1

Gold medal game
A1	Finland	6
B1	Netherlands	11
Bronze medal game
B2	France	10
B3	Latvia	3

===== Qualification games =====
Friday, November 25, 13:00

Sheet B	1	2	3	4	5	6	7	8	9	10	Final
France (Mercier) 🔨	0	2	0	0	0	0	1	1	0	2	6
Ireland (Wilson)	0	0	2	1	0	0	0	0	2	0	5

Sheet C	1	2	3	4	5	6	7	8	9	10	Final
Wales (Pougher) 🔨	0	1	0	2	0	0	3	2	0	X	8
Latvia (Trukšāns)	2	0	3	0	3	1	0	0	3	X	12

===== Semifinals =====
Friday, November 25, 19:30

Sheet B	1	2	3	4	5	6	7	8	9	10	Final
Netherlands (Gösgens) 🔨	3	3	1	5	0	0	0	1	X	X	13
Latvia (Trukšāns)	0	0	0	0	1	0	0	0	X	X	1

Sheet C	1	2	3	4	5	6	7	8	9	10	Final
Finland (Kiiskinen) 🔨	0	1	0	2	0	0	0	3	0	X	6
France (Mercier)	0	0	1	0	0	1	0	0	1	X	3

===== Bronze medal game =====
Saturday, November 26, 9:00

Sheet E	1	2	3	4	5	6	7	8	9	10	Final
France (Mercier) 🔨	3	0	1	0	0	4	2	0	X	X	10
Latvia (Trukšāns)	0	1	0	0	1	0	0	1	X	X	3

===== Gold medal game =====
Saturday, November 26, 9:00

Sheet D	1	2	3	4	5	6	7	8	9	10	Final
Finland (Kiiskinen)	0	0	0	2	0	2	0	2	0	X	6
Netherlands (Gösgens) 🔨	2	2	1	0	1	0	2	0	3	X	11

==== Final standings ====
Key
Teams Qualify for 2023 A Division
Teams Relegated to 2023 C Division

Place	Team
1st place, gold medalist(s)	Netherlands
2nd place, silver medalist(s)	Finland
3rd place, bronze medalist(s)	France
4	Latvia
5	Ireland
5	Wales
7	Austria
8	England
9	Slovakia
10	Hungary
11	Lithuania
12	Portugal
13	Belgium
14	Estonia
15	Ukraine
16	Slovenia

=== C division ===
==== Teams ====
The teams are listed as follows:

Andorra	Bulgaria	Croatia
Skip: Josep Garcia; Third: Enric Morral; Second: Cesar Mialdea; Lead: Valentin Ortiz	Skip: Reto Seiler; Third: Bojidar Momerin; Second: Stoil Georgiev; Lead: Stanimir Petrov; Alternate: Tihomir Todorov	Skip: Alen Čadež; Third: Hrvoje Tokić; Second: Mislav Martinic; Lead: Robert Mikulandrić; Alternate: Miroslav Jurković
Ireland	Liechtenstein	Lithuania
Skip: John Wilson; Third: Kyle Paradis; Second: James Russell; Lead: Craig Whyte; Alternate: Eoin McCrossan	Skip: Lukas Matt; Third: Harald Sprenger; Second: Johannes Zimmermann; Lead: Peter Prasch; Alternate: Urs Sprenger	Skip: Konstantin Rykov; Third: Paulius Rymeikis; Second: Mindaugas Balvočius; Lead: Vytis Kulakauskas; Alternate: Donatas Kiudys
Portugal	Romania	Ukraine
Skip: Steve Seixeiro; Third: Chris Ribau; Second: Joe Ribau; Lead: Víctor Santos; Alternate: Ramiro Santos	Skip: Allen Coliban; Third: Cristian Matau; Second: Bogdan Colceriu; Lead: Razvan Bouleanu	Skip: Eduard Nikolov; Third: Yaroslav Shchur; Second: Mykyta Velychko; Lead: Artem Suhak

==== Round robin standings ====
Final Round Robin Standings

Key
Teams to Playoffs

Country	Skip	W	L	W–L	DSC
Ireland	John Wilson	7	1	–	53.38
Ukraine	Eduard Nikolov	6	2	1–0	56.94
Lithuania	Konstantin Rykov	6	2	0–1	55.99
Portugal	Steve Seixeiro	5	3	1–0	73.47
Romania	Allen Coliban	5	3	0–1	95.77
Croatia	Alen Čadež	4	4	–	76.83
Bulgaria	Reto Seiler	2	6	–	59.99
Andorra	Josep Garcia	1	7	–	88.14
Liechtenstein	Lukas Matt	0	8	–	129.49

Round Robin Summary Table
Pos.	Country	Andorra	Bulgaria	Croatia		Liechtenstein	Lithuania	Portugal	Romania	Ukraine	Record
8	Andorra	—	2–12	7–8	3–6	10–1	1–9	3–6	2–11	3–6	1–7
7	Bulgaria	12–2	—	4–6	2–11	8–7	4–5	6–10	3–7	5–6	2–6
6	Croatia	8–7	6–4	—	7–5	7–3	4–10	9–12	1–9	5–6	4–4
1	Ireland	6–3	11–2	5–7	—	9–3	5–4	12–3	7–6	6–4	7–1
9	Liechtenstein	1–10	7–8	3–7	3–9	—	4–12	2–11	2–11	4–10	0–8
3	Lithuania	9–1	5–4	10–4	4–5	12–4	—	11–7	11–4	1–9	6–2
4	Portugal	6–3	10–6	12–9	3–12	11–2	7–11	—	5–3	2–7	5–3
5	Romania	11–2	7–3	9–1	6–7	11–2	4–11	3–5	—	6–4	5–3
2	Ukraine	6–3	6–5	6–5	4–6	10–4	9–1	7–2	4–6	—	6–2

==== Round robin results ====
All draw times are listed in Eastern European Time (UTC+03:00).

===== Draw 1 =====
Saturday, April 30, 17:00

Sheet A	1	2	3	4	5	6	7	8	9	Final
Lithuania (Rykov) 🔨	0	1	0	0	0	1	1	1	0	4
Ireland (Wilson)	0	0	1	3	0	0	0	0	1	5

Sheet B	1	2	3	4	5	6	7	8	Final
Romania (Coliban) 🔨	0	2	1	4	0	2	2	X	11
Andorra (Garcia)	0	0	0	0	2	0	0	X	2

Sheet C	1	2	3	4	5	6	7	8	Final
Portugal (Seixeiro) 🔨	0	5	0	0	0	2	1	2	10
Bulgaria (Seiler)	3	0	1	0	2	0	0	0	6

Sheet D	1	2	3	4	5	6	7	8	9	Final
Croatia (Čadež)	0	2	0	0	1	1	1	0	0	5
Ukraine (Nikolov) 🔨	1	0	2	1	0	0	0	1	1	6

===== Draw 2 =====
Sunday, May 1, 8:00

Sheet A	1	2	3	4	5	6	7	8	Final
Croatia (Čadež)	0	2	1	1	0	1	0	1	6
Bulgaria (Seiler) 🔨	0	0	0	0	4	0	0	0	4

Sheet B	1	2	3	4	5	6	7	8	Final
Ireland (Wilson) 🔨	0	1	2	0	2	0	0	1	6
Ukraine (Nikolov)	0	0	0	2	0	1	1	0	4

Sheet C	1	2	3	4	5	6	7	8	Final
Andorra (Garcia)	0	0	0	1	0	0	X	X	1
Lithuania (Rykov) 🔨	3	2	1	0	2	1	X	X	9

Sheet D	1	2	3	4	5	6	7	8	Final
Liechtenstein (Matt)	0	0	0	0	1	1	0	X	2
Romania (Coliban) 🔨	1	4	2	2	0	0	2	X	11

===== Draw 4 =====
Sunday, May 1, 16:00

Sheet A	1	2	3	4	5	6	7	8	Final
Ukraine (Nikolov)	1	2	1	1	0	4	X	X	9
Lithuania (Rykov) 🔨	0	0	0	0	1	0	X	X	1

Sheet B	1	2	3	4	5	6	7	8	Final
Bulgaria (Seiler) 🔨	2	0	0	0	0	1	0	0	3
Romania (Coliban)	0	1	1	1	1	0	2	1	7

Sheet C	1	2	3	4	5	6	7	8	Final
Liechtenstein (Matt)	0	0	1	0	1	1	0	0	3
Ireland (Wilson) 🔨	1	2	0	3	0	0	2	1	9

Sheet D	1	2	3	4	5	6	7	8	9	Final
Portugal (Seixeiro)	3	0	0	1	0	3	2	0	3	12
Croatia (Čadež) 🔨	0	3	1	0	2	0	0	3	0	9

===== Draw 6 =====
Monday, May 2, 8:00

Sheet A	1	2	3	4	5	6	7	8	Final
Portugal (Seixeiro) 🔨	3	0	1	1	3	0	3	X	11
Liechtenstein (Matt)	0	1	0	0	0	1	0	X	2

Sheet B	1	2	3	4	5	6	7	8	Final
Croatia (Čadež) 🔨	2	0	1	0	0	1	0	X	4
Lithuania (Rykov)	0	2	0	4	2	0	2	X	10

Sheet C	1	2	3	4	5	6	7	8	Final
Romania (Coliban)	0	0	1	3	0	0	0	2	6
Ukraine (Nikolov) 🔨	0	0	0	0	2	1	1	0	4

Sheet D	1	2	3	4	5	6	7	8	Final
Ireland (Wilson) 🔨	0	0	3	0	1	2	0	X	6
Andorra (Garcia)	1	1	0	1	0	0	0	X	3

===== Draw 8 =====
Monday, May 2, 16:00

Sheet A	1	2	3	4	5	6	7	8	Final
Ireland (Wilson)	0	0	1	2	0	1	1	2	7
Romania (Coliban) 🔨	4	1	0	0	1	0	0	0	6

Sheet B	1	2	3	4	5	6	7	8	Final
Andorra (Garcia) 🔨	1	3	0	4	1	1	X	X	10
Liechtenstein (Matt)	0	0	1	0	0	0	X	X	1

Sheet C	1	2	3	4	5	6	7	8	Final
Lithuania (Rykov) 🔨	0	0	5	0	6	0	0	X	11
Portugal (Seixeiro)	1	2	0	1	0	2	1	X	7

Sheet D	1	2	3	4	5	6	7	8	9	Final
Ukraine (Nikolov) 🔨	0	0	1	0	3	1	0	0	1	6
Bulgaria (Seiler)	1	1	0	1	0	0	0	2	0	5

===== Draw 10 =====
Tuesday, May 3, 8:00

Sheet A	1	2	3	4	5	6	7	8	Final
Andorra (Garcia) 🔨	4	0	1	1	0	1	0	0	7
Croatia (Čadež)	0	3	0	0	2	0	1	2	8

Sheet B	1	2	3	4	5	6	7	8	Final
Portugal (Seixeiro)	0	0	2	0	0	1	X	X	3
Ireland (Wilson) 🔨	2	6	0	4	0	0	X	X	12

Sheet C	1	2	3	4	5	6	7	8	Final
Bulgaria (Seiler) 🔨	0	3	0	3	0	1	1	0	8
Liechtenstein (Matt)	2	0	3	0	1	0	0	1	7

Sheet D	1	2	3	4	5	6	7	8	Final
Romania (Coliban) 🔨	1	0	1	0	2	0	0	X	4
Lithuania (Rykov)	0	2	0	5	0	3	1	X	11

===== Draw 12 =====
Tuesday, May 3, 16:00

Sheet A	1	2	3	4	5	6	7	8	Final
Liechtenstein (Matt)	0	3	0	1	0	0	X	X	4
Ukraine (Nikolov) 🔨	3	0	2	0	3	2	X	X	10

Sheet B	1	2	3	4	5	6	7	8	9	Final
Lithuania (Rykov)	0	0	1	0	1	0	0	2	1	5
Bulgaria (Seiler) 🔨	2	1	0	0	0	1	0	0	0	4

Sheet C	1	2	3	4	5	6	7	8	Final
Croatia (Čadež) 🔨	0	0	0	0	1	0	X	X	1
Romania (Coliban)	2	1	2	2	0	2	X	X	9

Sheet D	1	2	3	4	5	6	7	8	Final
Andorra (Garcia)	0	0	1	0	1	0	1	X	3
Portugal (Seixeiro) 🔨	2	1	0	2	0	1	0	X	6

===== Draw 14 =====
Wednesday, May 4, 9:00

Sheet A	1	2	3	4	5	6	7	8	Final
Romania (Coliban)	1	0	0	0	1	0	1	0	3
Portugal (Seixeiro) 🔨	0	2	0	0	0	2	0	1	5

Sheet B	1	2	3	4	5	6	7	8	Final
Liechtenstein (Matt)	0	0	1	0	0	0	2	0	3
Croatia (Čadež) 🔨	0	1	0	0	1	3	0	2	7

Sheet C	1	2	3	4	5	6	7	8	Final
Ukraine (Nikolov)	0	0	1	0	2	0	3	X	6
Andorra (Garcia) 🔨	0	1	0	1	0	1	0	X	3

Sheet D	1	2	3	4	5	6	7	8	Final
Bulgaria (Seiler)	0	0	0	1	0	1	X	X	2
Ireland (Wilson) 🔨	5	3	2	0	1	0	X	X	11

===== Draw 16 =====
Wednesday, May 4, 19:00

Sheet A	1	2	3	4	5	6	7	8	Final
Bulgaria (Seiler) 🔨	3	0	2	3	3	1	X	X	12
Andorra (Garcia)	0	2	0	0	0	0	X	X	2

Sheet B	1	2	3	4	5	6	7	8	Final
Ukraine (Nikolov) 🔨	1	1	0	3	0	1	1	X	7
Portugal (Seixeiro)	0	0	2	0	0	0	0	X	2

Sheet C	1	2	3	4	5	6	7	8	Final
Ireland (Wilson) 🔨	2	0	0	1	0	2	0	X	5
Croatia (Čadež)	0	1	0	0	3	0	3	X	7

Sheet D	1	2	3	4	5	6	7	8	Final
Lithuania (Rykov) 🔨	3	0	0	4	0	5	X	X	12
Liechtenstein (Matt)	0	2	1	0	1	0	X	X	4

==== Playoffs ====
Semifinals
1	Ireland	8
4	Portugal	2
2	Ukraine	10
3	Lithuania	7

Gold medal game
1	Ireland	8
2	Ukraine	2
Bronze medal game
4	Portugal	8
3	Lithuania	5

===== Semifinals =====
Thursday, May 5, 9:30

Sheet C	1	2	3	4	5	6	7	8	Final
Ireland (Wilson) 🔨	1	0	4	0	2	1	X	X	8
Portugal (Seixeiro)	0	1	0	1	0	0	X	X	2

Sheet D	1	2	3	4	5	6	7	8	9	Final
Ukraine (Nikolov) 🔨	0	1	0	2	0	1	3	0	3	10
Lithuania (Rykov)	2	0	2	0	2	0	0	1	0	7

===== Bronze medal game =====
Thursday, May 5, 15:30

Sheet A	1	2	3	4	5	6	7	8	9	Final
Portugal (Seixeiro)	0	0	1	0	2	1	0	1	3	8
Lithuania (Rykov) 🔨	1	1	0	1	0	0	2	0	0	5

===== Gold medal game =====
Thursday, May 5, 15:30

Sheet B	1	2	3	4	5	6	7	8	Final
Ireland (Wilson) 🔨	1	0	1	0	1	0	5	X	8
Ukraine (Nikolov)	0	1	0	0	0	1	0	X	2

==== Final standings ====
Key
Promoted to 2022 B division
Promoted to 2022 B division after the expulsion of Russia and Belarus

Place	Team
1st place, gold medalist(s)	Ireland
2nd place, silver medalist(s)	Ukraine
3rd place, bronze medalist(s)	Portugal
4	Lithuania
5	Romania
6	Croatia
7	Bulgaria
8	Andorra
9	Liechtenstein

== Women ==
=== A division ===
==== Qualification ====
The following nations qualified to participate in the 2022 European Curling Championship:

A Division Teams

Event	Vacancies	Qualified
2021 European Curling Championships A Division	~~8~~ 7	Scotland; Sweden; Germany; Italy; ~~Russia~~; Switzerland; Denmark; Turkey
2021 European Curling Championships B Division	~~2~~ 3	Norway; Latvia; Hungary
TOTAL	10	

===== Russian participation =====
As part of international sports' reaction to the Russian invasion of Ukraine, on September 23, the World Curling Federation made the decision to remove Russian and Belarusian teams from the 2022 European Curling Championships. Because the Russian women's team qualified for the 2022 A Division, their spot was filled by the next placing team in the 2021 B Division, which was Hungary.

==== Teams ====
The teams are listed as follows:

Denmark	Germany	Hungary	Italy	Latvia
Skip: Madeleine Dupont; Third: Mathilde Halse; Second: Denise Dupont; Lead: My Larsen; Alternate: Jasmin Lander	Skip: Daniela Jentsch; Third: Emira Abbes; Second: Pia-Lisa Schöll; Lead: Analena Jentsch; Alternate: Lena Kapp	Fourth: Bernadett Biró; Skip: Csilla Halász; Second: Blanka Biró; Lead: Tímea Schrotter-Nagy; Alternate: Zsanett Gunzinám	Skip: Stefania Constantini; Third: Marta Lo Deserto; Second: Angela Romei; Lead: Giulia Zardini Lacedelli; Alternate: Camilla Gilberti	Fourth: Ieva Rudzīte; Skip: Santa Blumberga-Bērziņa; Second: Katrīna Gaidule; Lead: Tīna Siliņa; Alternate: Betija Gulbe
Norway	Scotland	Sweden	Switzerland	Turkey
Fourth: Kristin Skaslien; Skip: Marianne Rørvik; Second: Mille Haslev Nordbye; Lead: Martine Rønning; Alternate: Maia Ramsfjell	Skip: Rebecca Morrison; Third: Gina Aitken; Second: Sophie Sinclair; Lead: Sophie Jackson; Alternate: Hailey Duff	Skip: Anna Hasselborg; Third: Agnes Knochenhauer; Second: Sofia Mabergs; Lead: Johanna Heldin; Alternate: Therese Westman	Fourth: Alina Pätz; Skip: Silvana Tirinzoni; Second: Carole Howald; Lead: Briar Schwaller-Hürlimann; Alternate: Anna Gut	Skip: Dilşat Yıldız; Third: Öznur Polat; Second: İfayet Şafak Çalıkuşu; Lead: Mihriban Polat; Alternate: Berfin Şengül

==== Round robin standings ====
Final Round Robin Standings

Key
Teams to Playoffs and Qualified for the 2023 World Women's Curling Championship
Teams Qualified for the 2023 World Women's Curling Championship
Teams Relegated to 2023 B Division

Country	Skip	W	L	W–L	PF	PA	EW	EL	BE	SE	S%	DSC
Denmark	Madeleine Dupont	8	1	–	81	42	41	29	2	17	82.2%	47.71
Italy	Stefania Constantini	6	3	1–0	68	47	40	29	6	16	77.5%	43.02
Switzerland	Silvana Tirinzoni	6	3	0–1	81	49	41	30	1	16	80.1%	25.48
Scotland	Rebecca Morrison	5	4	2–1; 1–0	57	61	36	37	3	14	77.3%	57.50
Sweden	Anna Hasselborg	5	4	2–1; 0–1	60	65	37	38	9	10	78.3%	34.55
Turkey	Dilşat Yıldız	5	4	1–2; 1–0	69	57	38	32	5	12	75.8%	45.06
Germany	Daniela Jentsch	5	4	1–2; 0–1	71	54	41	32	2	15	79.6%	35.54
Norway	Marianne Rørvik	4	5	–	63	70	34	39	3	7	79.4%	31.69
Hungary	Csilla Halász	1	8	–	28	92	17	47	1	2	63.5%	69.45
Latvia	Santa Blumberga-Bērziņa	0	9	–	41	82	30	42	2	5	68.1%	62.96

Round Robin Summary Table
Pos.	Country	Denmark	Germany	Hungary	Italy	Latvia	Norway	Scotland	Sweden	Switzerland	Turkey	Record
1	Denmark	—	12–3	9–1	9–2	7–2	9–6	11–6	10–6	9–6	5–10	8–1
7	Germany	3–12	—	12–1	8–3	10–3	7–10	9–3	5–7	10–7	7–8	5–4
9	Hungary	1–9	1–12	—	2–13	9–7	4–10	1–10	4–8	4–12	2–11	1–8
2	Italy	2–9	3–8	13–2	—	8–5	8–9	10–4	7–4	9–3	8–3	6–3
10	Latvia	2–7	3–10	7–9	5–8	—	3–10	4–7	9–11	2–10	6–10	0–9
8	Norway	6–9	10–7	10–4	9–8	10–3	—	6–8	6–7	4–14	2–10	4–5
4	Scotland	6–11	3–9	10–1	4–10	7–4	8–6	—	7–5	3–9	9–6	5–4
5	Sweden	6–10	7–5	8–4	4–7	11–9	7–6	5–7	—	4–10	8–7	5–4
3	Switzerland	6–9	7–10	12–4	3–9	10–2	14–4	9–3	10–4	—	10–4	6–3
6	Turkey	10–5	8–7	11–2	3–8	10–6	10–2	6–9	7–8	4–10	—	5–4

==== Round robin results ====
All draw times are listed in Eastern European Time (UTC+03:00).

===== Draw 1 =====
Friday, November 18, 20:00

Sheet A	1	2	3	4	5	6	7	8	9	10	Final
Italy (Constantini) 🔨	0	0	2	0	0	1	0	0	0	X	3
Germany (Jentsch)	2	0	0	2	0	0	3	0	1	X	8

Sheet B	1	2	3	4	5	6	7	8	9	10	Final
Sweden (Hasselborg) 🔨	0	1	0	1	0	0	2	2	0	0	6
Denmark (Dupont)	0	0	1	0	3	1	0	0	3	2	10

Sheet C	1	2	3	4	5	6	7	8	9	10	Final
Switzerland (Tirinzoni) 🔨	2	1	0	2	0	2	2	1	X	X	10
Latvia (Blumberga-Bērziņa)	0	0	1	0	1	0	0	0	X	X	2

Sheet D	1	2	3	4	5	6	7	8	9	10	Final
Norway (Rørvik) 🔨	3	3	0	2	0	0	0	1	1	X	10
Hungary (Halász)	0	0	1	0	1	0	2	0	0	X	4

Sheet E	1	2	3	4	5	6	7	8	9	10	Final
Turkey (Yıldız)	1	0	3	1	0	1	0	0	0	X	6
Scotland (Morrison) 🔨	0	2	0	0	2	0	2	1	2	X	9

===== Draw 2 =====
Saturday, November 19, 14:00

Sheet A	1	2	3	4	5	6	7	8	9	10	Final
Denmark (Dupont) 🔨	0	3	0	2	0	1	0	0	2	1	9
Norway (Rørvik)	1	0	2	0	2	0	0	1	0	0	6

Sheet B	1	2	3	4	5	6	7	8	9	10	Final
Germany (Jentsch) 🔨	2	1	2	2	1	0	4	X	X	X	12
Hungary (Halász)	0	0	0	0	0	1	0	X	X	X	1

Sheet C	1	2	3	4	5	6	7	8	9	10	Final
Turkey (Yıldız)	1	0	0	0	1	0	1	0	X	X	3
Italy (Constantini) 🔨	0	1	1	0	0	2	0	4	X	X	8

Sheet D	1	2	3	4	5	6	7	8	9	10	Final
Scotland (Morrison) 🔨	1	2	0	2	0	1	0	1	0	X	7
Latvia (Blumberga-Bērziņa)	0	0	1	0	1	0	1	0	1	X	4

Sheet E	1	2	3	4	5	6	7	8	9	10	Final
Sweden (Hasselborg) 🔨	0	0	0	1	0	0	3	0	0	X	4
Switzerland (Tirinzoni)	0	0	3	0	1	1	0	4	1	X	10

===== Draw 3 =====
Sunday, November 20, 9:00

Sheet A	1	2	3	4	5	6	7	8	9	10	Final
Latvia (Blumberga-Bērziņa)	0	3	2	0	0	0	3	0	1	0	9
Sweden (Hasselborg) 🔨	1	0	0	2	1	2	0	3	0	2	11

Sheet B	1	2	3	4	5	6	7	8	9	10	Final
Italy (Constantini)	0	2	2	0	0	2	2	1	1	X	10
Scotland (Morrison) 🔨	2	0	0	0	2	0	0	0	0	X	4

Sheet C	1	2	3	4	5	6	7	8	9	10	Final
Germany (Jentsch)	0	0	2	0	1	2	0	0	2	X	7
Norway (Rørvik) 🔨	1	0	0	2	0	0	2	5	0	X	10

Sheet D	1	2	3	4	5	6	7	8	9	10	Final
Switzerland (Tirinzoni) 🔨	2	0	1	2	4	0	0	1	X	X	10
Turkey (Yıldız)	0	1	0	0	0	2	1	0	X	X	4

Sheet E	1	2	3	4	5	6	7	8	9	10	Final
Denmark (Dupont)	2	2	1	1	1	0	2	X	X	X	9
Hungary (Halász) 🔨	0	0	0	0	0	1	0	X	X	X	1

===== Draw 4 =====
Sunday, November 20, 19:00

Sheet A	1	2	3	4	5	6	7	8	9	10	Final
Hungary (Halász)	0	0	0	0	0	2	0	X	X	X	2
Turkey (Yıldız) 🔨	0	2	3	3	1	0	2	X	X	X	11

Sheet B	1	2	3	4	5	6	7	8	9	10	Final
Switzerland (Tirinzoni) 🔨	2	0	1	0	2	0	4	5	X	X	14
Norway (Rørvik)	0	3	0	1	0	0	0	0	X	X	4

Sheet C	1	2	3	4	5	6	7	8	9	10	Final
Scotland (Morrison)	0	1	0	0	3	1	0	1	0	0	6
Denmark (Dupont) 🔨	2	0	0	2	0	0	2	0	3	2	11

Sheet D	1	2	3	4	5	6	7	8	9	10	Final
Latvia (Blumberga-Bērziņa)	0	1	0	1	0	2	0	0	1	0	5
Italy (Constantini) 🔨	2	0	1	0	0	0	2	1	0	2	8

Sheet E	1	2	3	4	5	6	7	8	9	10	Final
Germany (Jentsch)	0	1	0	1	1	0	0	1	1	0	5
Sweden (Hasselborg) 🔨	1	0	3	0	0	1	1	0	0	1	7

===== Draw 5 =====
Monday, November 21, 12:00

Sheet A	1	2	3	4	5	6	7	8	9	10	Final
Switzerland (Tirinzoni) 🔨	1	0	3	0	1	0	0	0	1	X	6
Denmark (Dupont)	0	2	0	3	0	1	2	1	0	X	9

Sheet B	1	2	3	4	5	6	7	8	9	10	Final
Turkey (Yıldız) 🔨	2	1	0	1	0	1	0	2	0	1	8
Germany (Jentsch)	0	0	2	0	1	0	3	0	1	0	7

Sheet C	1	2	3	4	5	6	7	8	9	10	Final
Italy (Constantini) 🔨	3	1	3	1	0	3	2	X	X	X	13
Hungary (Halász)	0	0	0	0	2	0	0	X	X	X	2

Sheet D	1	2	3	4	5	6	7	8	9	10	Final
Sweden (Hasselborg) 🔨	0	0	0	2	0	3	0	0	0	X	5
Scotland (Morrison)	0	2	0	0	1	0	2	1	1	X	7

Sheet E	1	2	3	4	5	6	7	8	9	10	Final
Norway (Rørvik) 🔨	2	0	0	2	1	0	3	2	X	X	10
Latvia (Blumberga-Bērziņa)	0	0	1	0	0	2	0	0	X	X	3

===== Draw 6 =====
Monday, November 21, 20:00

Sheet A	1	2	3	4	5	6	7	8	9	10	Final
Turkey (Yıldız)	0	0	0	1	0	3	0	1	5	X	10
Latvia (Blumberga-Bērziņa) 🔨	0	1	1	0	2	0	2	0	0	X	6

Sheet B	1	2	3	4	5	6	7	8	9	10	Final
Denmark (Dupont) 🔨	3	0	1	1	2	0	2	X	X	X	9
Italy (Constantini)	0	1	0	0	0	1	0	X	X	X	2

Sheet C	1	2	3	4	5	6	7	8	9	10	Final
Norway (Rørvik)	0	0	0	1	0	0	2	0	3	0	6
Sweden (Hasselborg) 🔨	0	1	2	0	1	1	0	1	0	1	7

Sheet D	1	2	3	4	5	6	7	8	9	10	Final
Hungary (Halász)	0	2	0	2	0	0	0	X	X	X	4
Switzerland (Tirinzoni) 🔨	4	0	3	0	0	2	3	X	X	X	12

Sheet E	1	2	3	4	5	6	7	8	9	10	Final
Scotland (Morrison)	1	0	0	0	1	0	1	0	0	X	3
Germany (Jentsch) 🔨	0	2	0	2	0	2	0	2	1	X	9

===== Draw 7 =====
Tuesday, November 22, 14:00

Sheet A	1	2	3	4	5	6	7	8	9	10	Final
Sweden (Hasselborg) 🔨	3	0	0	1	1	0	0	3	0	X	8
Hungary (Halász)	0	1	0	0	0	0	2	0	1	X	4

Sheet B	1	2	3	4	5	6	7	8	9	10	Final
Scotland (Morrison)	0	0	1	0	0	0	2	0	X	X	3
Switzerland (Tirinzoni) 🔨	2	1	0	1	1	1	0	3	X	X	9

Sheet C	1	2	3	4	5	6	7	8	9	10	Final
Latvia (Blumberga-Bērziņa)	0	0	1	0	2	0	X	X	X	X	3
Germany (Jentsch) 🔨	2	1	0	4	0	3	X	X	X	X	10

Sheet D	1	2	3	4	5	6	7	8	9	10	Final
Turkey (Yıldız) 🔨	0	1	1	0	3	0	4	1	X	X	10
Denmark (Dupont)	0	0	0	4	0	1	0	0	X	X	5

Sheet E	1	2	3	4	5	6	7	8	9	10	11	Final
Italy (Constantini) 🔨	1	1	0	1	0	1	0	1	0	3	0	8
Norway (Rørvik)	0	0	2	0	1	0	3	0	2	0	1	9

===== Draw 8 =====
Wednesday, November 23, 9:00

Sheet A	1	2	3	4	5	6	7	8	9	10	Final
Germany (Jentsch) 🔨	4	0	0	1	2	0	1	0	1	1	10
Switzerland (Tirinzoni)	0	3	1	0	0	2	0	1	0	0	7

Sheet B	1	2	3	4	5	6	7	8	9	10	Final
Norway (Rørvik)	0	0	0	1	0	1	0	X	X	X	2
Turkey (Yıldız) 🔨	0	0	2	0	4	0	4	X	X	X	10

Sheet C	1	2	3	4	5	6	7	8	9	10	Final
Hungary (Halász) 🔨	0	0	1	0	0	0	X	X	X	X	1
Scotland (Morrison)	4	1	0	3	1	1	X	X	X	X	10

Sheet D	1	2	3	4	5	6	7	8	9	10	Final
Italy (Constantini) 🔨	0	1	0	0	0	2	0	0	0	4	7
Sweden (Hasselborg)	1	0	0	1	0	0	0	2	0	0	4

Sheet E	1	2	3	4	5	6	7	8	9	10	Final
Latvia (Blumberga-Bērziņa)	0	1	0	0	0	1	X	X	X	X	2
Denmark (Dupont) 🔨	4	0	0	1	2	0	X	X	X	X	7

===== Draw 9 =====
Wednesday, November 23, 19:00

Sheet A	1	2	3	4	5	6	7	8	9	10	Final
Norway (Rørvik) 🔨	2	0	2	0	1	0	0	1	0	0	6
Scotland (Morrison)	0	2	0	0	0	1	1	0	3	1	8

Sheet B	1	2	3	4	5	6	7	8	9	10	Final
Hungary (Halász)	0	2	4	0	0	0	1	0	2	0	9
Latvia (Blumberga-Bērziņa) 🔨	1	0	0	2	1	1	0	1	0	1	7

Sheet C	1	2	3	4	5	6	7	8	9	10	Final
Sweden (Hasselborg)	1	0	2	0	1	1	0	3	0	0	8
Turkey (Yıldız) 🔨	0	1	0	3	0	0	1	0	1	1	7

Sheet D	1	2	3	4	5	6	7	8	9	10	Final
Denmark (Dupont)	0	0	3	0	1	0	1	2	5	X	12
Germany (Jentsch) 🔨	1	1	0	0	0	1	0	0	0	X	3

Sheet E	1	2	3	4	5	6	7	8	9	10	Final
Switzerland (Tirinzoni) 🔨	0	0	0	2	1	0	0	0	X	X	3
Italy (Constantini)	3	1	1	0	0	2	1	1	X	X	9

==== Playoffs ====
Semifinals
1	Denmark	11
4	Scotland	3
2	Italy	5
3	Switzerland	9

Gold medal game
1	Denmark	8
3	Switzerland	4
Bronze medal game
4	Scotland	9
2	Italy	5

===== Semifinal 1 =====
Thursday, November 24, 12:00

Sheet C	1	2	3	4	5	6	7	8	9	10	Final
Italy (Constantini) 🔨	2	0	1	0	0	1	0	1	0	X	5
Switzerland (Tirinzoni)	0	2	0	0	2	0	2	0	3	X	9

Player percentages
Italy		Switzerland	
Giulia Zardini Lacedelli	79%	Briar Schwaller-Hürlimann	78%
Angela Romei	82%	Carole Howald	83%
Marta Lo Deserto	70%	Silvana Tirinzoni	86%
Stefania Constantini	74%	Alina Pätz	84%
Total	76%	Total	83%

===== Semifinal 2 =====
Thursday, November 24, 16:00

Sheet C	1	2	3	4	5	6	7	8	9	10	Final
Denmark (Dupont) 🔨	1	0	3	2	3	0	2	0	X	X	11
Scotland (Morrison)	0	1	0	0	0	1	0	1	X	X	3

Player percentages
Denmark		Scotland	
My Larsen	88%	Sophie Jackson	70%
Denise Dupont	92%	Sophie Sinclair	81%
Mathilde Halse	86%	Gina Aitken	61%
Madeleine Dupont	94%	Rebecca Morrison	61%
Total	90%	Total	68%

===== Bronze medal game =====
Friday, November 25, 14:00

Sheet C	1	2	3	4	5	6	7	8	9	10	Final
Scotland (Morrison)	3	0	1	0	0	2	2	1	0	X	9
Italy (Constantini) 🔨	0	2	0	1	1	0	0	0	1	X	5

Player percentages
Scotland		Italy	
Sophie Jackson	81%	Giulia Zardini Lacedelli	92%
Sophie Sinclair	76%	Angela Romei	76%
Gina Aitken	79%	Marta Lo Deserto	68%
Rebecca Morrison	81%	Stefania Constantini	65%
Total	79%	Total	75%

===== Gold medal game =====
Saturday, November 26, 9:00

Sheet C	1	2	3	4	5	6	7	8	9	10	11	Final
Denmark (Dupont) 🔨	1	0	0	0	1	0	0	1	0	1	4	8
Switzerland (Tirinzoni)	0	1	0	0	0	2	0	0	1	0	0	4

Player percentages
Denmark		Switzerland	
My Larsen	92%	Briar Schwaller-Hürlimann	81%
Denise Dupont	88%	Carole Howald	74%
Mathilde Halse	83%	Silvana Tirinzoni	77%
Madeleine Dupont	85%	Alina Pätz	85%
Total	87%	Total	79%

==== Player percentages ====
Round Robin only

Leads	%
(Switzerland) Briar Schwaller-Hürlimann	88.2
(Germany) Analena Jentsch	87.7
(Scotland) Sophie Jackson	86.6
(Denmark) My Larsen	86.3
(Italy) Giulia Zardini Lacedelli	85.5

Seconds	%
(Denmark) Denise Dupont	83.3
(Switzerland) Carole Howald	82.8
(Norway) Mille Haslev Nordbye	80.7
(Sweden) Sofia Mabergs	78.8
(Germany) Pia-Lisa Schöll	75.3

Thirds	%
(Denmark) Mathilde Halse	84.4
(Norway) Marianne Rørvik (Skip)	78.2
(Sweden) Agnes Knochenhauer	77.1
(Germany) Emira Abbes	75.8
(Turkey) Öznur Polat	75.8

Skips	%
(Germany) Daniela Jentsch	80.3
(Italy) Stefania Constantini	76.6
(Switzerland) Alina Pätz (Fourth)	75.5
(Sweden) Anna Hasselborg	75.0
(Norway) Kristin Skaslien (Fourth)	74.7

==== Final standings ====
Key
Teams Advance to the 2023 World Women's Curling Championship
Teams Relegated to 2023 B Division

Place	Team
1st place, gold medalist(s)	Denmark
2nd place, silver medalist(s)	Switzerland
3rd place, bronze medalist(s)	Scotland
4	Italy
5	Sweden
6	Turkey
7	Germany
8	Norway
9	Hungary
10	Latvia

=== B division ===
==== Teams ====
The teams are listed as follows:

Austria	Belgium	Czech Republic	England	Estonia
Fourth: Hannah Augustin; Skip: Marijke Reitsma; Second: Sara Haidinger; Lead: Johanna Hoess; Alternate: Verena Pfluegler	Fourth: Danielle Berus; Third: Veerle Geerinckx; Second: Kim Catteceur; Skip: Caro van Oosterwyck; Alternate: Annemiek Huiskamp	Skip: Alžběta Zelingrová; Third: Aneta Müllerová; Second: Michaela Baudyšová; Lead: Klára Svatoňová; Alternate: Lenka Hronová	Skip: Lisa Farnell; Third: Kitty Conlin; Second: Vikki Brannigan; Lead: Jessica Skelton; Alternate: Kathryn Spain	Skip: Marie Kaldvee; Third: Liisa Turmann; Second: Kerli Laidsalu; Lead: Erika Tuvike
Finland	Lithuania	Slovakia	Slovenia	Spain
Skip: Miia Ahrenberg; Third: Minna Karvinen; Second: Tiina Suuripää; Lead: Tuuli Rissanen; Alternate: Bonnie Nilhamn-Kuosmanen	Skip: Virginija Paulauskaitė; Third: Olga Dvojeglazova; Second: Dovilė Aukštuolytė; Lead: Rūta Blažienė; Alternate: Justina Zalieckienė	Skip: Gabriela Kajanová; Third: Silvia Sýkorová; Second: Linda Haferová; Lead: Nina Mayerová; Alternate: Daniela Matulová	Fourth: Maruša Gorišek; Third: Nadja Pipan; Skip: Ajda Zavrtanik Drglin; Lead: Liza Gregori	Skip: Lydia Vallés Rodríguez; Third: Leire Carasa Lázaro; Second: Oihane Ruiz Díaz; Lead: Lucía Majuelo Gandarias; Alternate: María Olarizu Sedano Parra

==== Round robin standings ====
Final Round Robin Standings

Key
Teams to Playoffs
Teams to Relegated to 2023 C Division

Country	Skip	W	L	W–L	DSC
Czech Republic	Alžběta Zelingrová	8	1	1–0	51.36
Estonia	Marie Kaldvee	8	1	0–1	35.26
Lithuania	Virginija Paulauskaitė	7	2	–	107.41
Slovenia	Ajda Zavrtanik Drglin	5	4	–	88.02
Finland	Miia Ahrenberg	4	5	1–0	64.46
Belgium	Caro van Oosterwyck	4	5	0–1	88.68
England	Lisa Farnell	3	6	2–0	86.48
Austria	Marijke Reitsma	3	6	1–1	94.51
Slovakia	Gabriela Kajanová	3	6	0–2	113.28
Spain	Lydia Vallés Rodríguez	0	9	–	115.51

Round Robin Summary Table
Pos.	Country	Austria	Belgium	Czech Republic	England	Estonia	Finland	Lithuania	Slovakia	Slovenia	Spain	Record
8	Austria	—	7–10	1–8	5–7	3–5	11–4	4–7	6–4	4–8	10–3	3–6
6	Belgium	10–7	—	3–13	13–4	2–10	2–9	7–9	6–8	7–5	9–8	4–5
1	Czech Republic	8–1	13–3	—	11–4	8–5	13–4	5–7	13–1	5–3	11–2	8–1
7	England	7–5	4–13	4–11	—	6–7	3–10	8–9	7–6	8–9	10–2	3–6
2	Estonia	5–3	10–2	5–8	7–6	—	11–5	10–9	9–3	10–2	14–4	8–1
5	Finland	4–11	9–2	4–13	10–3	5–11	—	1–10	7–9	7–4	10–6	4–5
3	Lithuania	7–4	9–7	7–5	9–8	9–10	10–1	—	8–3	7–8	7–4	7–2
9	Slovakia	4–6	8–6	1–13	6–7	3–9	9–7	3–8	—	4–7	8–7	3–6
4	Slovenia	8–4	5–7	3–5	9–8	2–10	4–7	8–7	7–4	—	9–6	5–4
10	Spain	3–10	8–9	2–11	2–10	4–14	6–10	4–7	7–8	6–9	—	0–9

==== Playoffs ====
Semifinals
1	Czech Republic	8
4	Slovenia	7
2	Estonia	7
3	Lithuania	6

Gold medal game
1	Czech Republic	3
2	Estonia	10
Bronze medal game
4	Slovenia	6
3	Lithuania	10

===== Semifinals =====
Friday, November 25, 19:30

Sheet D	1	2	3	4	5	6	7	8	9	10	Final
Czech Republic (Zelingrová) 🔨	1	1	0	0	2	0	3	0	0	1	8
Slovenia (Zavrtanik Drglin)	0	0	1	1	0	1	0	3	1	0	7

Sheet E	1	2	3	4	5	6	7	8	9	10	11	Final
Estonia (Kaldvee) 🔨	0	0	0	1	3	0	0	2	0	0	1	7
Lithuania (Paulauskaitė)	0	1	1	0	0	1	2	0	0	1	0	6

===== Bronze medal game =====
Saturday, November 26, 9:00

Sheet B	1	2	3	4	5	6	7	8	9	10	Final
Slovenia (Zavrtanik Drglin)	2	0	1	0	0	0	0	3	0	X	6
Lithuania (Paulauskaitė) 🔨	0	3	0	1	1	3	1	0	1	X	10

===== Gold medal game =====
Saturday, November 26, 9:00

Sheet C	1	2	3	4	5	6	7	8	9	10	Final
Czech Republic (Zelingrová) 🔨	1	0	1	0	0	0	1	0	X	X	3
Estonia (Kaldvee)	0	2	0	2	0	2	0	4	X	X	10

==== Final standings ====
Key
Teams Qualify for 2023 A Division
Teams Relegated to 2023 C Division

Place	Team
1st place, gold medalist(s)	Estonia
2nd place, silver medalist(s)	Czech Republic
3rd place, bronze medalist(s)	Lithuania
4	Slovenia
5	Finland
6	Belgium
7	England
8	Austria
9	Slovakia
10	Spain

=== C division ===
==== Teams ====
The teams are listed as follows:

Belgium	Croatia	Finland	France
Fourth: Danielle Berus; Third: Veerle Geerinckx; Second: Kim Catteceur; Skip: Caro van Oosterwyck; Alternate: Mirte Michiels	Skip: Iva Penava; Third: Iva Roso; Second: Zrinka Muhek; Lead: Marija Simunjak; Alternate: Antonija Maricevic	Skip: Miia Ahrenberg; Third: Minna Karvinen; Second: Tuuli Rissanen; Lead: Tiina Suuripää	Skip: Allison Brageul; Third: Elodie Fuchs; Second: Elodie Verger; Lead: Sylvie Reist
Ireland	Spain	Ukraine	Wales
Skip: Alisa Anderson; Third: Katie Kerr; Second: Nina Clancy; Lead: Stephanie McDonald	Skip: Lydia Vallés Rodríguez; Third: Leire Carasa Lázaro; Second: Oihane Ruiz Díaz; Lead: Lucía Majuelo Gandarias; Alternate: María Olarizu Sedano Parra	Skip: Anastasiia Kotova; Third: Oleksandra Kononenko; Second: Polina Putintseva; Lead: Yaroslava Kalinichenko; Alternate: Diana Moskalenko	Skip: Laura Beever; Third: Judith Glazier; Second: Emily Simpson; Lead: Anna Carruthers

==== Round robin standings ====
Final Round Robin Standings

Key
Teams to Playoffs

Country	Skip	W	L	W–L	DSC
Finland	Miia Ahrenberg	7	0	–	75.28
Belgium	Caro van Oosterwyck	4	3	2–1; 1–0	71.10
Ireland	Alisa Anderson	4	3	2–1; 0–1	68.31
Spain	Lydia Vallés Rodríguez	4	3	1–2; 1–0	90.94
Croatia	Iva Peneva	4	3	1–2; 0–1	138.03
Wales	Laura Beever	2	5	1–0	105.08
Ukraine	Anastasiia Kotova	2	5	0–1	109.08
France	Allison Brageul	1	6	–	145.24

Round Robin Summary Table
Pos.	Country	Belgium	Croatia	Finland	France		Spain	Ukraine	Wales	Record
2	Belgium	—	2–3	4–8	9–4	8–7	8–4	5–9	6–4	4–3
5	Croatia	3–2	—	4–8	8–4	3–11	6–8	7–5	9–4	4–3
1	Finland	8–4	8–4	—	14–3	5–4	8–6	7–1	7–6	7–0
8	France	4–9	4–8	3–14	—	4–7	1–12	12–10	3–10	1–6
3	Ireland	7–8	11–3	4–5	7–4	—	8–4	7–9	8–2	4–3
4	Spain	4–8	8–6	6–8	12–1	4–8	—	9–7	6–3	4–3
7	Ukraine	9–5	5–7	1–7	10–12	9–7	7–9	—	6–7	2–5
6	Wales	4–6	4–9	6–7	10–3	2–8	3–6	7–6	—	2–5

==== Round robin results ====
All draw times are listed in Eastern European Time (UTC+03:00).

===== Draw 3 =====
Sunday, May 1, 12:00

Sheet A	1	2	3	4	5	6	7	8	Final
Belgium (van Oosterwyck)	0	0	2	0	1	1	0	X	4
Finland (Ahrenberg) 🔨	3	2	0	3	0	0	0	X	8

Sheet B	1	2	3	4	5	6	7	8	Final
France (Brageul)	0	2	0	0	1	0	X	X	3
Wales (Beever) 🔨	3	0	1	1	0	5	X	X	10

Sheet C	1	2	3	4	5	6	7	8	9	Final
Ireland (Anderson) 🔨	1	0	2	0	0	1	3	0	0	7
Ukraine (Kotova)	0	3	0	1	2	0	0	1	2	9

Sheet D	1	2	3	4	5	6	7	8	Final
Croatia (Peneva)	0	2	3	0	0	0	1	X	6
Spain (Vallés Rodríguez) 🔨	3	0	0	1	3	1	0	X	8

===== Draw 5 =====
Sunday, May 1, 20:00

Sheet A	1	2	3	4	5	6	7	8	9	Final
Wales (Beever) 🔨	0	1	0	0	2	1	0	2	1	7
Ukraine (Kotova)	1	0	2	2	0	0	1	0	0	6

Sheet B	1	2	3	4	5	6	7	8	Final
Belgium (van Oosterwyck) 🔨	1	3	0	1	0	3	0	X	8
Spain (Vallés Rodríguez)	0	0	1	0	1	0	2	X	4

Sheet C	1	2	3	4	5	6	7	8	Final
Finland (Ahrenberg) 🔨	0	0	1	0	3	0	4	X	8
Croatia (Peneva)	0	0	0	3	0	1	0	X	4

Sheet D	1	2	3	4	5	6	7	8	Final
France (Brageul) 🔨	0	1	1	1	1	0	0	0	4
Ireland (Anderson)	1	0	0	0	0	1	3	2	7

===== Draw 7 =====
Monday, May 2, 12:00

Sheet A	1	2	3	4	5	6	7	8	Final
Finland (Ahrenberg) 🔨	1	0	2	1	1	0	0	0	5
Ireland (Anderson)	0	1	0	0	0	1	1	1	4

Sheet B	1	2	3	4	5	6	7	8	Final
Wales (Beever) 🔨	0	0	2	0	1	1	0	X	4
Croatia (Peneva)	1	4	0	3	0	0	1	X	9

Sheet C	1	2	3	4	5	6	7	8	Final
France (Brageul) 🔨	0	0	1	0	0	0	X	X	1
Spain (Vallés Rodríguez)	0	3	0	4	1	4	X	X	12

Sheet D	1	2	3	4	5	6	7	8	Final
Belgium (van Oosterwyck) 🔨	1	0	1	0	3	0	0	X	5
Ukraine (Kotova)	0	2	0	4	0	2	1	X	9

===== Draw 9 =====
Monday, May 2, 20:00

Sheet A	1	2	3	4	5	6	7	8	Final
Croatia (Peneva)	0	2	3	1	0	1	1	X	8
France (Brageul) 🔨	3	0	0	0	1	0	0	X	4

Sheet B	1	2	3	4	5	6	7	8	Final
Ireland (Anderson) 🔨	1	0	3	0	0	2	0	1	7
Belgium (van Oosterwyck)	0	2	0	1	3	0	2	0	8

Sheet C	1	2	3	4	5	6	7	8	Final
Ukraine (Kotova) 🔨	0	0	0	0	1	0	X	X	1
Finland (Ahrenberg)	1	2	1	2	0	1	X	X	7

Sheet D	1	2	3	4	5	6	7	8	Final
Spain (Vallés Rodríguez)	1	0	0	2	1	0	2	X	6
Wales (Beever) 🔨	0	1	1	0	0	1	0	X	3

===== Draw 11 =====
Tuesday, May 3, 12:00

Sheet A	1	2	3	4	5	6	7	8	Final
Ukraine (Kotova)	0	0	3	0	0	1	0	3	7
Spain (Vallés Rodríguez) 🔨	1	2	0	3	2	0	1	0	9

Sheet B	1	2	3	4	5	6	7	8	Final
Finland (Ahrenberg) 🔨	3	6	0	0	3	2	X	X	14
France (Brageul)	0	0	2	1	0	0	X	X	3

Sheet C	1	2	3	4	5	6	7	8	Final
Belgium (van Oosterwyck) 🔨	1	1	0	0	1	0	2	1	6
Wales (Beever)	0	0	1	1	0	2	0	0	4

Sheet D	1	2	3	4	5	6	7	8	Final
Ireland (Anderson) 🔨	3	3	0	2	1	2	X	X	11
Croatia (Peneva)	0	0	3	0	0	0	X	X	3

===== Draw 13 =====
Tuesday, May 3, 20:00

Sheet A	1	2	3	4	5	6	7	8	Final
France (Brageul)	0	0	1	0	3	0	0	X	4
Belgium (van Oosterwyck) 🔨	1	1	0	2	0	3	2	X	9

Sheet B	1	2	3	4	5	6	7	8	Final
Croatia (Peneva)	3	0	1	0	0	2	0	1	7
Ukraine (Kotova) 🔨	0	1	0	3	1	0	0	0	5

Sheet C	1	2	3	4	5	6	7	8	Final
Spain (Vallés Rodríguez) 🔨	1	0	0	2	0	0	1	X	4
Ireland (Anderson)	0	4	2	0	1	1	0	X	8

Sheet D	1	2	3	4	5	6	7	8	Final
Wales (Beever)	1	1	0	2	0	1	1	0	6
Finland (Ahrenberg) 🔨	0	0	3	0	1	0	0	3	7

===== Draw 15 =====
Wednesday, May 4, 14:00

Sheet A	1	2	3	4	5	6	7	8	Final
Ireland (Anderson)	1	2	0	4	0	1	X	X	8
Wales (Beever) 🔨	0	0	1	0	1	0	X	X	2

Sheet B	1	2	3	4	5	6	7	8	Final
Spain (Vallés Rodríguez) 🔨	1	0	1	0	2	0	2	0	6
Finland (Ahrenberg)	0	1	0	2	0	3	0	2	8

Sheet C	1	2	3	4	5	6	7	8	Final
Croatia (Peneva)	0	0	0	0	2	0	0	1	3
Belgium (van Oosterwyck) 🔨	1	0	0	0	0	1	0	0	2

Sheet D	1	2	3	4	5	6	7	8	9	Final
Ukraine (Kotova) 🔨	2	0	3	0	3	0	0	2	0	10
France (Brageul)	0	1	0	1	0	6	2	0	2	12

==== Playoffs ====
Semifinals
1	Finland	6
4	Spain	7
2	Belgium	11
3	Ireland	8

Gold medal game
4	Spain	6
2	Belgium	9
Bronze medal game
1	Finland	9
3	Ireland	7

===== Semifinals =====
Thursday, May 5, 9:30

Sheet A	1	2	3	4	5	6	7	8	Final
Belgium (van Oosterwyck) 🔨	1	0	0	1	5	3	0	1	11
Ireland (Anderson)	0	4	1	0	0	0	3	0	8

Sheet B	1	2	3	4	5	6	7	8	Final
Finland (Ahrenberg) 🔨	2	0	1	0	1	0	2	0	6
Spain (Vallés Rodríguez)	0	0	0	4	0	1	0	2	7

===== Bronze medal game =====
Thursday, May 5, 15:30

Sheet D	1	2	3	4	5	6	7	8	Final
Finland (Ahrenberg)	0	0	3	2	0	1	0	3	9
Ireland (Anderson) 🔨	1	1	0	0	2	0	3	0	7

===== Gold medal game =====
Thursday, May 5, 15:30

Sheet C	1	2	3	4	5	6	7	8	9	Final
Spain (Vallés Rodríguez)	0	3	0	0	0	1	0	2	0	6
Belgium (van Oosterwyck) 🔨	1	0	2	1	1	0	1	0	3	9

==== Final standings ====
Key
Promoted to 2022 B division
Promoted to 2022 B division after the expulsion of Russia

Place	Team
1st place, gold medalist(s)	Belgium
2nd place, silver medalist(s)	Spain
3rd place, bronze medalist(s)	Finland
4	Ireland
5	Croatia
6	Wales
7	Ukraine
8	France
