= 2024–25 curling season =

- Sport: Curling

Seasons
- ← 2023–24 2025–26 →

The 2024–25 curling season began in May 2024 and ended in May 2025.

== World Curling Federation events ==
=== Championships ===
| Event | | | Gold | Silver | Bronze |
|---|---|---|---|---|---|
| World Mixed Curling Championship; Aberdeen, Scotland, Oct. 12–19 | | | Sweden (Granbom) | Japan (Hase) | Switzerland (Wüest) |
| Pan Continental Curling Championships; Lacombe, Alberta, Canada, Oct. 27 – Nov. 2 | A | M | China (Xu) | Japan (Abe) | United States (Shuster) |
| Pan Continental Curling Championships; Lacombe, Alberta, Canada, Oct. 27 – Nov. 2 | A | W | Canada (Homan) | South Korea (Gim) | China (Wang) |
| Pan Continental Curling Championships; Lacombe, Alberta, Canada, Oct. 27 – Nov. 2 | B | M | Philippines (Pfister) | Kazakhstan (Zhuzbay) | Hong Kong (Chang) |
| Pan Continental Curling Championships; Lacombe, Alberta, Canada, Oct. 27 – Nov. 2 | B | W | Australia (Williams) | Jamaica (Shepherd-Spurgeon) | Kazakhstan (Ebauyer) |
| World Wheelchair-B Curling Championship; Lohja, Finland, Nov. 3–8 | | | United States (Thums) | Japan (Kashiwabara) | England (Pimblett) |
| European Curling Championships; Lohja, Finland & Östersund, Sweden, Nov. 16–23 | A | M | Germany (Muskatewitz) | Scotland (Mouat) | Norway (Ramsfjell) |
| European Curling Championships; Lohja, Finland & Östersund, Sweden, Nov. 16–23 | A | W | Switzerland (Tirinzoni) | Sweden (Hasselborg) | Scotland (Jackson) |
| European Curling Championships; Lohja, Finland & Östersund, Sweden, Nov. 16–23 | B | M | Denmark (Schmidt) | Poland (Stych) | Spain (Vez) |
| European Curling Championships; Lohja, Finland & Östersund, Sweden, Nov. 16–23 | B | W | Czech Republic (Paulová) | Germany (Messenzehl) | Poland (Lipińska) |
| World Junior-B Curling Championships; Lohja, Finland, Dec. 8–19 | | M | South Korea (Kim) | Switzerland (Lüthold) | Japan (Nakahara) |
| World Junior-B Curling Championships; Lohja, Finland, Dec. 8–19 | | W | South Korea (Kang) | Latvia (Barone) | China (Li) |
| World University Games; Turin, Italy, Jan. 11–23 | | M | Norway (Høstmælingen) | United States (Hebert) | Switzerland (Iseli) |
| World University Games; Turin, Italy, Jan. 11–23 | | W | Japan (Miura) | South Korea (Kang) | Canada (Gray-Withers) |
| World University Games; Turin, Italy, Jan. 11–23 | | MD | Great Britain (Munro / Carson) | Germany (Sutor / Harsch) | Canada (Zheng / Pietrangelo) |
| Asian Winter Games; Harbin, China, Feb. 4–14 | | M | Philippines (Pfister) | South Korea (Lee) | China (Xu) |
| Asian Winter Games; Harbin, China, Feb. 4–14 | | W | South Korea (Gim) | China (Wang) | Japan (Miura) |
| Asian Winter Games; Harbin, China, Feb. 4–14 | | MD | Japan (Koana / Aoki) | South Korea (Kim / Seong) | China (Han / Wang) |
| World Wheelchair Curling Championship; Stevenston, Scotland, Mar. 1–8 | | | China (Wang) | South Korea (Lee) | Canada (Dash) |
| World Wheelchair Mixed Doubles Curling Championship; Stevenston, Scotland, Mar. 11–16 | | | Japan (Ogawa / Nakajima) | Scotland (McKenna / Nibloe) | Estonia (Riidebach / Villau) |
| World Women's Curling Championship; Uijeongbu, South Korea, Mar. 15–23 | | | Canada (Homan) | Switzerland (Tirinzoni) | China (Wang) |
| World Men's Curling Championship; Moose Jaw, Saskatchewan, Canada, Mar. 29 – Apr. 6 | | | Scotland (Mouat) | Switzerland (Schwaller) | Canada (Jacobs) |
| World Junior Curling Championships; Cortina d'Ampezzo, Italy, Apr. 12–21 | | M | Italy (Spiller) | Norway (Høstmælingen) | Scotland (Carson) |
| World Junior Curling Championships; Cortina d'Ampezzo, Italy, Apr. 12–21 | | W | South Korea (Kang) | Germany (Messenzehl) | Canada (MacNutt) |
| World Mixed Doubles Curling Championship; Fredericton, New Brunswick, Canada, Apr. 26 – May 3 | | | Italy (Constantini / Mosaner) | Scotland (Dodds / Mouat) | Australia (Gill / Hewitt) |
| World Senior Curling Championships; Fredericton, New Brunswick, Canada, Apr. 26 – May 3 | | M | Canada (Bryden) | Scotland (Brewster) | United States (Farbelow) |
| World Senior Curling Championships; Fredericton, New Brunswick, Canada, Apr. 26 – May 3 | | W | Scotland (Lockhart) | Canada (Ford-Johnston) | Ireland (Sinclair) |
| European Curling Championships; Östersund, Sweden, Apr. 26 – May 1 | C | M | Latvia (Gulbis) | Slovenia (Tisler) | Liechtenstein (Matt) |
| European Curling Championships; Östersund, Sweden, Apr. 26 – May 1 | C | W | Slovakia (Kajanová) | Israel (Sone) | Spain (Viela) |
| World Junior Mixed Doubles Curling Championship; Edmonton, Alberta, Canada, May 6–11 | | | Italy (Grande / Spiller) | Denmark (Schmidt / Schmidt) | South Korea (Kang / Kim) |

=== Qualification events ===
| Event | Qualifiers |
|---|---|
| World Mixed Doubles Qualification Event; Dumfries, Scotland, Dec. 1–7 | Spain; New Zealand; Turkey; Finland |

== Other events ==
| Event | | Winning team | Runner-up team |
|---|---|---|---|
| United States Mixed Doubles Olympic Pre-Trials; Chaska, Minnesota, Aug. 8–11 | | (Minnesota) Anderson / Stopera | (Minnesota) Bear / Oldenburg |
| Curling1spoon Elite 8 Gangneung, South Korea, Aug. 16–18 | | Ha Seung-youn | Kim Eun-jung |
| Everest North American Curling Club Championships; Lafayette, Colorado, Sept. 17–18 | M | Canada (Sherrard) | United States (Berg) |
| Everest North American Curling Club Championships; Lafayette, Colorado, Sept. 17–18 | W | Canada (Burgess) | United States (Schroeder) |
| German European Trials; Füssen, Germany, Oct. 18–20 | | (Bavaria) Marc Muskatewitz | (Bavaria) Sixten Totzek |
| FISU Canadian Mixed Doubles Qualifier; Edmonton, Alberta, Oct. 18–21 | | (Ontario) Zheng / Pietrangelo | (Ontario) Smith / Small |
| Swiss European Trials; Arlesheim, Switzerland, Oct. 24–27 | M | (Canton of Geneva) Yannick Schwaller | (Canton of Bern) Michael Brunner |
| Swiss European Trials; Arlesheim, Switzerland, Oct. 24–27 | W | (Aargau) Silvana Tirinzoni | (Canton of Zurich) Xenia Schwaller |
| Canadian Mixed Doubles Olympic Trials Qualifier #1; Maple Ridge, British Columbia, Oct. 31 – Nov. 3 | | (Alberta) (Saskatchewan) Tran / Kleiter | (Ontario) Weagle / Epping |
| Canadian Mixed Doubles Olympic Trials Qualifier #2; Guelph, Ontario, Nov. 21–24 | | (Alberta) Homan / Bottcher | (Ontario) Wasylkiw / Konings |
| Canadian Mixed Doubles Olympic Trials Qualifier #3; Banff & Canmore, Alberta, Dec. 5–8 | | (Alberta) Peterman / Gallant | (Manitoba) Lott / Lott |
| Atlantic University Sport Curling Championships; Halifax, Nova Scotia, Jan. 2–5 | M | (Newfoundland and Labrador) Memorial Sea-Hawks (Perry) | (New Brunswick) UNB Reds (Stewart) |
| Atlantic University Sport Curling Championships; Halifax, Nova Scotia, Jan. 2–5 | W | (Nova Scotia) Dalhousie Tigers (MacNutt) | (Nova Scotia) St. Francis Xavier X-Women (Rafuse) |
| Swedish World Mixed Doubles Qualifier; Jönköping, Sweden, Feb. 26 – Mar. 2 | | Hasselborg / Eriksson | I. Wranå / R. Wranå |
| German World Mixed Doubles Qualifier; Füssen, Germany, Mar. 11–13 | | (Bavaria) Schöll / Sutor | (Bavaria) Abbes / Harsch |
| Battle of the Sexes; Toronto, Ontario, Apr. 7 | | (Scotland) Bruce Mouat | (Ontario) Rachel Homan |
| TCG All-Star Game; Nashville, Tennessee, Apr. 15–16 (Filmed) / Summer 2025 (Broadcast) | | Team Morris | Team Hamilton |

== Curling Canada events ==
=== Championships ===
| Event | | Gold | Silver | Bronze |
|---|---|---|---|---|
| Canadian Mixed Curling Championship; St. Catharines, Ontario, Nov. 3–9 | | Nova Scotia (Purcell) | Saskatchewan (Ackerman) | Alberta (Balderston) |
| Canadian Curling Club Championships; Barrie, Ontario, Nov. 18–24 | M | Ontario (Keon) | Manitoba (Wasylik) | Northern Ontario (Johnston) |
| Canadian Curling Club Championships; Barrie, Ontario, Nov. 18–24 | W | Nova Scotia (Armstrong) | Prince Edward Island (Power) | Manitoba (McCreanor) |
| Canadian Senior Curling Championships; Moncton, New Brunswick, Dec. 1–7 | M | Saskatchewan (Bryden) | Alberta (Pahl) | New Brunswick (Odishaw) |
| Canadian Senior Curling Championships; Moncton, New Brunswick, Dec. 1–7 | W | Alberta (Ford-Johnston) | Ontario (Rizzo) | Nova Scotia (Radford) |
| Canadian Mixed Doubles Curling Olympic Trials; Liverpool, Nova Scotia, Dec. 30 – Jan. 4 | | (Alberta) Peterman / Gallant | (Alberta) Homan / Bottcher | (Ontario) Weagle / Epping |
| Scotties Tournament of Hearts; Thunder Bay, Ontario, Feb. 14–23 | | Canada (Homan) | Manitoba (Einarson) | Nova Scotia (Black) |
| Canadian U18 Curling Championships; Saskatoon, Saskatchewan, Feb. 17–22 | M | Nova Scotia 1 (Atherton) | Ontario (MacTavish) | Quebec 2 (Janidlo) |
| Canadian U18 Curling Championships; Saskatoon, Saskatchewan, Feb. 17–22 | W | Nova Scotia 1 (Blades) | Alberta 2 (Desormeau) | Ontario 1 (Frlan) |
| U Sports/Curling Canada University Curling Championships; Lethbridge, Alberta, Feb. 24–28 | M | (Ontario) Wilfrid Laurier Golden Hawks (Mulima) | (Ontario) Carleton Ravens (Nicholls) | (Newfoundland and Labrador) Memorial Sea-Hawks (Perry) |
| U Sports/Curling Canada University Curling Championships; Lethbridge, Alberta, Feb. 24–28 | W | (Ontario) Wilfrid Laurier Golden Hawks (Artichuk) | (Ontario) McMaster Marauders (Fitzgerald) | (Nova Scotia) Dalhousie Tigers (MacNutt) |
| CCAA/Curling Canada College Curling Championships; Lethbridge, Alberta, Feb. 24–28 | M | (Ontario) Mohawk Mountaineers (Jones) | (Alberta) SAIT Trojans (Baum) | (Alberta) Red Deer Polytechnic Kings (Woznesensky) |
| CCAA/Curling Canada College Curling Championships; Lethbridge, Alberta, Feb. 24–28 | W | (British Columbia) PACWEST (Bowles) | (Alberta) Red Deer Polytechnic Queens (Raniseth) | (Alberta) Concordia Thunder (Wood) |
| Montana's Brier; Kelowna, British Columbia, Feb. 28 – Mar. 9 | | Alberta (Jacobs) | Manitoba (Dunstone) | Canada (Gushue) |
| Canadian Under-21 World Mixed Doubles Qualifier; Summerside, Prince Edward Island, Mar. 16–20 | | (Ontario) (Newfoundland and Labrador) Vivier / Codner | (New Brunswick) Tracy / Riggs | (Manitoba) Hollins / Huminicki |
| Canadian Mixed Doubles Curling Championship; Summerside, Prince Edward Island, Mar. 16–21 | | (Manitoba) Lott / Lott | (Nova Scotia) Powers / Saunders | (Northern Ontario) Brunton / Horgan (New Brunswick) Adams / Robichaud |
| Canadian Junior Curling Championships; Summerside, Prince Edward Island, Mar. 23–30 | M | Nova Scotia 2 (MacIsaac) | New Brunswick (Dalrymple) | Nova Scotia 1 (Atherton) |
| Canadian Junior Curling Championships; Summerside, Prince Edward Island, Mar. 23–30 | W | Alberta 1 (Plett) | Quebec 1 (Fortin) | British Columbia (Hafeli) |
| Canadian Wheelchair Curling Championship; Boucherville, Quebec, Apr. 28 – May 3 | | Northern Ontario (Dean) | Quebec 1 (Marquis) | British Columbia 1 (Robinson) |

=== Qualification events ===
| Event | | Qualifiers |
|---|---|---|
| Under-21 Mixed Doubles Qualifiers; Nov. 26–30; Moncton, New Brunswick (East); Brandon, Manitoba (West) | East | (New Brunswick) Tracy / Riggs (Nova Scotia) Fisher / Fisher (Newfoundland and Labrador) Neary / Hancock (Ontario) (Newfoundland and Labrador) Vivier / Codner |
| Under-21 Mixed Doubles Qualifiers; Nov. 26–30; Moncton, New Brunswick (East); Brandon, Manitoba (West) | West | (Manitoba) Hollins / Huminicki (Alberta) Duncan / Keenan (Alberta) Ector / Jacques (Alberta) Ryhorchuk / Peterson |

=== Invitationals ===
| Event | | Winning skip | Runner-up skip |
|---|---|---|---|
| U25 NextGen Classic; Edmonton, Alberta, Aug. 27 – Sep. 2 | M | (Manitoba) Jordon McDonald | (Ontario) Jayden King |
| U25 NextGen Classic; Edmonton, Alberta, Aug. 27 – Sep. 2 | W | (British Columbia) Taylor Reese-Hansen | (Alberta) Gracelyn Richards |
| U25 NextGen Classic; Edmonton, Alberta, Aug. 27 – Sep. 2 | MD | (Ontario) Zheng / Pietrangelo | (Manitoba) Arbuckle / Macdonell |
| PointsBet Invitational; Calgary, Alberta, Sep. 25–29 | M | (Saskatchewan) Mike McEwen | (Newfoundland and Labrador) Brad Gushue |
| PointsBet Invitational; Calgary, Alberta, Sep. 25–29 | W | (Ontario) Rachel Homan | (Alberta) Kayla Skrlik |
| SGI Canada Best of the West (U30); Saskatoon, Saskatchewan, Apr. 24–27 | M | (British Columbia) Connor Deane | (Alberta) Jacob Libbus |
| SGI Canada Best of the West (U30); Saskatoon, Saskatchewan, Apr. 24–27 | W | (Alberta) Serena Gray-Withers | (British Columbia) Taylor Reese-Hansen |

=== Provincial and Territorial Playdowns ===
| Province/ Territory | Women | | | Men | | |
| Province/ Territory | Event | Champion | Runner-up | Event | Champion | Runner-up |
|---|---|---|---|---|---|---|
| Alberta; Rimbey, Jan. 22–26 (Women's); Erskine, Feb. 5–9 (Men's) | Alberta Women's Championship | Kayla Skrlik | Nicky Kaufman | Boston Pizza Cup | Kevin Koe | Evan van Amsterdam |
| British Columbia; Langley, Jan. 21–26 | BC Women's Championship | Corryn Brown | Kayla MacMillan | BC Men's Championship | Cameron de Jong | Glenn Venance |
| Manitoba; Pilot Mound, Jan. 22–26 (Women's); Portage la Prairie, Feb. 5–9 (Men's) | RME Women of the Rings | Kate Cameron | Beth Peterson | Viterra Championship | Reid Carruthers | Braden Calvert |
| New Brunswick; Saint Andrews, Jan. 15–18 (Women's); Fredericton, Jan. 29 – Feb. 2 (Men's) | New Brunswick; Women's Championship | Melissa Adams | Sylvie Quillian; Justine Comeau | New Brunswick Tankard | James Grattan | Jamie Stewart |
| Newfoundland and Labrador; St. John's, Jan. 21–25 | Newfoundland and Labrador; Women's Championship | Brooke Godsland | Carrie Vautour | Newfoundland and Labrador Tankard | Ty Dilello | Andrew Symonds |
| Northern Ontario; Thunder Bay, Jan. 21–26 | Northern Ontario; Women's Championship | Krista McCarville | Emma Artichuk | Northern Ontario; Men's Provincial Championship | John Epping | Dylan Johnston |
| Northwest Territories; Yellowknife, Jan. 17–19 (Women's); Hay River, Jan. 30 – Feb. 2 (Men's) | NWT Women's Championship | Kerry Galusha | Betti Delorey | NWT Men's Championship | Aaron Bartling | Jamie Koe |
| Nova Scotia; Halifax, Jan. 14–19 | Ocean Contractors; Women's Championship | Christina Black | Mackenzie Mitchell | Ocean Contractors; Men's Championship | Owen Purcell | Kendal Thompson |
| Nunavut; Iqaluit, Jan. 10–11 | Nunavut; Women's Championship | Julia Weagle | — | Nunavut Mens Territorials | Shane Latimer | Peter Mackey |
| Ontario; Cobourg, Jan. 19–26 | Ontario Women's Championship | Danielle Inglis | Chelsea Brandwood | Ontario Men's Championship | Sam Mooibroek | Scott Howard |
| Prince Edward Island; Bloomfield, Jan. 23–25 | PEI Women's Championship | Jane DiCarlo | Rachel MacLean; Hillary Selkirk | PEI Men's Championship | Tyler Smith | Steve vanOuwerkerk; Dennis Watts; Darren Higgins |
| Quebec; Alma, Jan. 14–19 | Quebec; Women's Championship | Laurie St-Georges | Émilia Gagné | Quebec Tankard | Jean-Michel Ménard | Robert Desjardins |
| Saskatchewan; Kindersley, Jan. 21–26 | Viterra Prairie Pinnacle | Nancy Martin | Jolene Campbell | SaskTel Tankard | Rylan Kleiter | Steve Laycock |
| Yukon; Whitehorse, Jan. 10–12 | Yukon Women's Championship | Bayly Scoffin | Patty Wallingham | Yukon Men's Championship | Thomas Scoffin | Dustin Mikkelsen |

== National championships ==
=== Australia ===
| Event | Gold | Silver | Bronze |
|---|---|---|---|
| Australian Men's Curling Championship; Naseby, New Zealand, May 13–16 | Hugh Millikin | Matt Panoussi | Ian Gagnon |
| Australian Women's Curling Championship; Naseby, New Zealand, May 13–16 | Helen Williams | Anne Powell | Ros Gallagher |
| Australian Mixed Curling Championship; Naseby, New Zealand, May 16–19 | Matt Panoussi | Dustin Armstrong | Sean Hall |
| Australian Mixed Doubles Curling Championship; Naseby, New Zealand, May 19–23 | T. Gill / Hewitt | Westhagen / Panoussi | J. Gill / Bence |

=== Czech Republic ===
| Event | | Gold | Silver | Bronze |
|---|---|---|---|---|
| Czech Junior Mixed Doubles Curling Championship; Prague, Nov. 15—18 | | Brnoso; Sofie Krupičková / Ondřej Blaha coach: Marek Černovský | DION WC; Julie Zelingrová / Vít Chabičovský coach: Vladimír Černovský | Kameňáci; Ema Košáková / Tobiáš Votava coach: Martin Votava |
| Czech Mixed Doubles Curling Championship; Prague, Jan. 31 – Feb. 4 | | Dion WC (Zelingrová / Chabičovský) | ASC Dukla (Paulová / Paul) | Brnoso (Krupičková / Blaha) |
| Czech Men's Curling Championship; Prague, Feb. 27 – Mar. 6 | | Zbraslav Klíma; Lukáš Klíma | DION ALPHA; Vít Chabičovský | Zbraslav OH; Karel Klíma |
| Czech Women's Curling Championship; Prague, Feb. 27 – Mar. 6 | | | | |
| Czech Junior Curling Championships; Prague, Mar. 27 – Apr. 1 | M | | | |
| Czech Junior Curling Championships; Prague, Mar. 27 – Apr. 1 | W | | | |
| Czech Senior Curling Championships; Prague, Apr. 11–13 | M | | | |
| Czech Senior Curling Championships; Prague, Apr. 11–13 | W | | | |
| Czech Mixed Curling Championship; Brno, Apr. 24–27 | | | | |
| Czech Wheelchair Curling Championship; Prague, Apr. 26–27 | | | | |

=== Denmark ===
| Event | | Gold | Silver | Bronze |
|---|---|---|---|---|
| Danish Mixed Curling Championship; Hvidovre, Sep. 27–29 | | Henrik Holtermann | Karolina Jensen | Charlotte Jurlander |
| Danish Senior Men's Curling Championships; Esbjerg, Jan. 10–12 | | Søren Tidmand | Mikael Kvist | Bent Kristoffersen |
| Danish Junior Mixed Doubles Curling Championship; Gentofte, Jan. 17–19 | | Katrine Schmidt / Jacob Schmidt | Maja Nyboe / Kasper Jurlander | Emilie Holterman / Nikki Jensen |
| Danish Wheelchair Mixed Doubles Curling Championship; Gentofte, Jan. 17–19 | | Helle Schmidt / Kenneth Ørbæk | Sussie Nielsen / Peter Nielsen | — |
| Danish Men's Curling Championship; Hvidovre, Jan. 31 – Feb. 2 | | Rasmus Stjerne | Kasper Wiksten | Jacob Schmidt |
| Danish Women's Curling Championship; Hvidovre, Jan. 31 – Feb. 2 | | Madeleine Dupont | Katrine Schmidt | — |
| Danish Mixed Doubles Curling Championship; Gentofte, Feb. 7–9 | | J. Holtermann / H. Holtermann | N. Wiksten / K. Wiksten | K. Schmidt / J. Schmidt |
| Danish Junior Curling Championships; Hvidovre, Mar. 14–17 | M | | | |
| Danish Junior Curling Championships; Hvidovre, Mar. 14–17 | W | | | |

=== Estonia ===
| Event | Gold | Silver | Bronze |
|---|---|---|---|
| Estonian Men's Curling Championship; Tallinn, Jan. 31–Feb. 2 | Eduard Veltsman | Erkki Lill | Margus Tubalkain |
| Estonian Women's Curling Championship; Tallinn, Jan. 31–Feb. 2 | Liisa Turmann | Ingrid Novikova | – |
| Estonian Mixed Doubles Curling Championship; Tallinn, Feb. 27–Mar. 2 | Kaldvee / Lill | Madisson / Kukner | Kaare / Padama |
| Estonian Mixed Curling Championship; Tallinn, May 8–11 | Margus Tubalkain | Harri Lill | Andres Jakobson |

=== Finland ===
| Event | Gold | Silver | Bronze |
|---|---|---|---|
| Finnish Wheelchair Curling Championship; Harjavalta, Sep. 6–8 | Markku Karjalainen | Juha Rajala | — |
| Finnish Wheelchair Mixed Doubles Curling Championship; Lohja, Dec. 20–22 | Harri Tuomaala / Ritva Lampinen | Valeriina Silas / Juha Rajala | Tiia Tallgren / Yrjö Jääskeläinen |
| Finnish Senior Men's Curling Championship; Kangasniemi, Jan. 16-19 | Tomi Rantamäki | Timo Kauste | Oiva Manninen |
| Finnish Women's Curling Championship; Joensuu, Jan. 30 - Feb. 2 | Eszter Juhász | Janina Lindström | — |
| Finnish Mixed Doubles Curling Championship; Åland, Feb. 6–9 | Suuripää / Rantamäki | Immonen / Sipilä | Kiiskinen / Kiiskinen |
| Finnish Men's Curling Championship; Joensuu, Feb. 16–18 | Paavo Kuosmanen | Jermu Pöllänen | Matias Hänninen |
| Finnish Mixed Curling Championship; Hyvinkää, Apr. 10–13 | Ville Forsström | Jermu Pöllänen | Bonnie Nilhamn-Kuosmanen |

=== Germany ===
| Event | Gold | Silver | Bronze |
|---|---|---|---|
| German Men's Curling Championship; Hamburg, Feb. 7–9 | Marc Muskatewitz | Sixten Totzek | Felix Schulze |
| German Mixed Doubles Curling Championship; Hamburg, Mar. 6–9 | Schöll / Sutor | Tiuliakova / Totzek | Abbes / Harsch |

=== Hungary ===
| Event | Gold | Silver | Bronze |
|---|---|---|---|
| Hungarian Mixed Doubles Curling Championship; Budapest, Oct. 23–27 | Linda Joó / Raul Kárász | Blanka Dencső / Gergely Szabó | Vera Kalocsai-van Dorp / Ottó Kalocsay |
| Hungarian Men's Curling Championship; Budapest, Jan. 31 - Feb. 16 | PTSE Men | UTE United Leads | Vasas Szenior Férfi |
| Hungarian Women's Curling Championship; Budapest, Feb. 1-16 | Vasas Nők | Hackers | FTC Girl Jam |
| Hungarian Junior Mixed Doubles Curling Championship; Budapest, Mar. 7-9 | Laura Lauchsz / Raul Kárász | Emma Erzsébet Szurmay / Baján Kán Ferenci | Mihalca Tudor / Ganea Emma |

=== Italy ===
| Event | Gold | Silver | Bronze |
|---|---|---|---|
| Italian Mixed Doubles Curling Championship; Brunico, Jan. 30 – Feb. 2 | Rachele Scalesse / Alberto Pimpini | Giulia Zardini Lacedelli / Francesco De Zanna | Stefania Constantini / Alessandro Zisa |
| Italian Men's Curling Championship; Turin, Nov. 30 – Feb. 4 (Qualification); Cembra, Feb. 20–23 (Final) | Joël Retornaz | Stefano Spiller | Stefano Gilli |
| Italian Women's Curling Championship; Cembra, Nov. 30 – Jan. 12 (Qualification); Cortina d'Ampezzo, Mar. 6–9 (Final) | Stefania Constantini | Rebecca Mariani | Denise Pimpini |

=== Japan ===
| Event | | Gold | Silver | Bronze |
|---|---|---|---|---|
| Japan Mixed Doubles Curling Championship; Wakkanai, Hokkaido, Dec. 2–8 | | (Nagano Prefecture) Matsumura / (Hokkaido) Tanida | (Yamanashi Prefecture) Koana / (Hokkaido) Aoki | (Nagano Prefecture) Kitazawa / (Hokkaido) Usui |
| Japan Curling Championships; Yokohama, Kanagawa, Feb. 2–9 | M | (Nagano Prefecture) Riku Yanagisawa | (Hokkaido) Takumi Maeda | (Hokkaido) Shinya Abe |
| Japan Curling Championships; Yokohama, Kanagawa, Feb. 2–9 | W | (Hokkaido) Sayaka Yoshimura | (Hokkaido) Miku Nihira | (Hokkaido) Satsuki Fujisawa |

=== Latvia ===
| Event | | Gold | Silver | Bronze |
|---|---|---|---|---|
| Latvian Wheelchair Mixed Doubles Curling Championship; Riga, Oct. 7–12 | | Poļina Rožkova / Agris Lasmans | Linda Meijere / Ojārs Briedis | Irīda Janeviča / Aleksandrs Dimbovskis |
| Latvian Junior Mixed Doubles Curling Championship; Riga, Jan. 20-26 | | Katrīna Gaidule / Roberts Reinis Buncis | Evelīna Barone / Kristaps Zass | Dārta Regža / Toms Sondors |
| Latvian Mixed Curling Championship; Riga, Feb. 14-15 | | A41/Gulbis (Ritvars Gulbis) | SK OB/Mangale (Linda Mangale) | — |
| Latvian Mixed Doubles Curling Championship; Riga, Feb. 26 - Mar. 2 | | Katrīna Gaidule / Roberts Reinis Buncis | Evelīna Barone / Kristaps Zass | Sabīne Jeske / Arnis Veidemanis |
| Latvian Junior Curling Championships; Riga, Mar. 10-16 | M | TKK/Zass (Kristaps Zass) | VKK/Cirvelis (Ričards Cirvelis) | — |
| Latvian Junior Curling Championships; Riga, Mar. 10-16 | W | JKK/Barone (Evelīna Barone) | SK OB/Regža (Agate Regža) | — |
| Latvian Men's Curling Championship; Riga, Apr. 7-13 | | CC Rīga/Veidemanis (Arnis Veidemanis) | CC Rīga/GulbisRitvars Gulbis | VKK/Krimskis (Aivis Krimskis) |
| Latvian Women's Curling Championship; Riga, Apr. 7-13 | | JKK/Barone (Evelīna Barone) | VKK/Blumberga-Bērziņa (Santa Blumberga-Bērziņa) | KKR/Avena (Līga Avena) |

=== New Zealand ===
| Event | Gold | Silver | Bronze |
|---|---|---|---|
| New Zealand Mixed Curling Championship; Auckland, Jun. 1–3 | Brett Sargon | Sasha Goloborodko | William Sheard |
| New Zealand Men's Curling Championship; Naseby, Jun. 26–30 | Anton Hood | Peter de Boer | Sean Becker |
| New Zealand Women's Curling Championship; Naseby, Jun. 26–30 | Bridget Becker | Courtney Smith | Chelsea Suddens |
| New Zealand Mixed Doubles Curling Championship; Naseby, Aug. 15–18 | J. Smith / B. Smith | C. Smith / Hood | B. Becker / S. Becker |

=== Norway ===
| Event | | Gold | Silver | Bronze |
|---|---|---|---|---|
| Norwegian Junior Mixed Doubles Curling Championship; Lillehammer, Nov. 16–17 | | Østgård / Eriksen | Hausstätter / Svorkmo | Rønning / Dæhlin |
| Norwegian Men's Curling Championship; Halden, Feb. 6–9 | | Lukas Høstmælingen | Magnus Ramsfjell | Steffen Walstad |
| Norwegian Women's Curling Championship; Halden, Feb. 6–9 | | Torild Bjørnstad | Marianne Rørvik | Sylvi Hausstätter |
| Norwegian Senior Men's Curling Championships; Kristiansand, Feb. 21–23 | | Even Ugland | Espen de Lange | Kjell Berg |
| Norwegian Mixed Doubles Curling Championship; Trondheim, Feb. 28 – Mar. 2 | | Skaslien / Nedregotten | Østgård / Eriksen | Rønning / Brænden |
| Norwegian Junior Curling Championships; Oppdal, Mar. 7–8 | M | | | |
| Norwegian Junior Curling Championships; Oppdal, Mar. 7–8 | W | | | |
| Norwegian Mixed Curling Championship; Oslo, Apr. 25–27 | | | | |

=== Poland ===
| Event | Gold | Silver | Bronze |
|---|---|---|---|
| Polish Mixed Doubles Curling Championship; Łódź, Oct. 24–27 | Walczak / Augustyniak | Lipińska / Stych | Rybicka / Dzikowski |

=== Russia ===
| Event | Gold | Silver | Bronze |
|---|---|---|---|
| Russian Mixed Curling Cup; Novosibirsk, Sep. 6–10 | Moscow Oblast 1 (Mikhail Vaskov) | Novosibirsk Oblast 1 (Alexandra Stoyarosova) | Irkutsk Oblast - Komsomoll 1 (Nikolai Lysakov) |
| Russian Mixed Doubles Curling Cup; Novosibirsk, Sep. 13–16 | Moscow Oblast 1 Anastasia Moskaleva / Kirill Surovov | Moscow Oblast 2 Daria Morozova / Mikhail Vaskov | Irkutsk Oblast - Komsomoll 1 Elizaveta Trukhina / Nikolai Lysakov |
| Russian Wheelchair Mixed Doubles Curling Cup; Sochi, Sep. 24–29 | Moscow 2 Alexandra Chechetkina / Andrei Meshcheryakov | Saint Petersburg; Anna Karpushina / Alexey Lyubimtsev | Moscow 1 Julia Nikitina / Alexander Shevchenko |
| Russian Men's Curling Cup; Sochi, Dec. 4–8 | Saint Petersburg 1 (Alexey Timofeev) | Irkutsk Oblast - Komsomoll 1 (Nikolai Lysakov) | Saint Petersburg 2 (German Doronin) |
| Russian Women's Curling Cup; Sochi, Dec. 9–16 | Saint Petersburg 1 (Diana Margaryan) | Novosibirsk Oblast (Aleksandra Stoyarosova) | Krasnodar Krai 1 (Olga Jarkova) |
| Russian Wheelchair Curling Cup; Sochi, Dec. 20-25 | Samara Oblast (Igor Ruzheynikov) | Moscow (Konstantin Kurokhtin) | Saint Petersburg 2 (Alexey Lyubimtsev) |
| Russian Mixed Doubles Curling Championship; Sochi, Jan. 23–27 | Saint Petersburg 2 Anastasia Bryzgalova / Alexander Krushelnitskiy | Komsomoll 1 - Irkutsk Oblast; Elizaveta Trukhina / Nikolay Lysakov | Saint Petersburg 3 Nkeirouka Ezekh / Oleg Krasikov |
| Russian Wheelchair Mixed Doubles Curling Championship; Sochi, Mar. 1-8 | Saint Petersburg 1 Anna Karpushina / Alexey Lyubimtsev | Krasnodar Krai; Maria Gendeleva / Alexey Golivko | Moscow; Aleksandra Chechyotkina / Andrei Meshcheryakov |
| Russian Women's Curling Championship; Sochi, Apr. 3–12 | | | |
| Russian Men's Curling Championship; Sochi, Apr. 12–21 | | | |
| Russian Wheelchair Curling Championship; Novosibirsk, Apr. 22–30 | | | |
| Russian Mixed Curling Championship; Irkutsk, May 1–7 | | | |

Video: "Russian Curling TV" (in Russian). (Official RuTube-channel of Russian Curling Federation)

=== Scotland ===
| Event | | Gold | Silver | Bronze |
|---|---|---|---|---|
| Scottish Junior Curling Championships; Aberdeen, Nov. 11–17 | M | Orrin Carson | Arran Thomson | Ethan Brewster; Ben Rankin |
| Scottish Junior Curling Championships; Aberdeen, Nov. 11–17 | W | Callie Soutar | Tia Laurie | Jodi Leigh Bass; Laura Watt |
| Scottish Mixed Doubles Curling Championship; Aberdeen, Dec. 19–22 | | Sinclair / Brydone | Jackson / McFadzean | McMillan / Bryce; Davie / Watt |
| Scottish Men's Curling Championship; Dumfries, Feb. 2–8 | | Ross Whyte | Bruce Mouat | James Craik; Orrin Carson |
| Scottish Women's Curling Championship; Dumfries, Feb. 2–8 | | Fay Henderson | Rebecca Morrison | Laura Watt |
| Scottish Senior Curling Championships; Forfar, Feb. 13–16 | M | Tom Brewster | Graham Cormack | Graeme Connal; Hammy McMillan |
| Scottish Senior Curling Championships; Forfar, Feb. 13–16 | W | Jackie Lockhart | Margaret Agnew | Karen Kennedy |
| Scottish Mixed Curling Championship; Forfar, Mar. 28–30 | | | | |

=== South Korea ===
| Event | Gold | Silver | Bronze |
|---|---|---|---|
| Korean Men's Curling Championship; Uijeongbu, Jun. 9–17 | Lee Jae-beom | Park Jong-duk | Kim Soo-hyuk |
| Korean Women's Curling Championship; Uijeongbu, Jun. 9–17 | Gim Eun-ji | Ha Seung-youn | Kim Eun-jung |
| Korean Mixed Doubles Curling Championship; Jincheon, Jul. 20–28 | K. Kim / Seong | C. Kim / Lee | H. Kim / Yoo |

=== Sweden ===
| Event | | Gold | Silver | Bronze |
|---|---|---|---|---|
| Swedish Mixed Doubles Curling Championship; Sundbyberg, Dec. 12–15 | | Sundbybergs CK (Jennie Wåhlin / Johan Nygren) | Mjölby AI Curling (Emma Moberg / Olle Moberg, coach: Mattias Moberg) | Härnösands CK (Nilla Hallström / Johannes Patz, coach: Rickard Hallström) |
| Swedish Wheelchair Mixed Doubles Curling Championship; Borlänge, Dec. 13–15 | | Härnösands CK / Jönköpings CC (Kristina Ulander / Mikael Peterson) | Karlstads CK (Johanna Glennert / Sabina Johansson) | Jönköpings CC (Tommy Andersson / Mats-Ola Engborg) |
| Swedish Junior Curling Championships; Umeå, Jan. 3–6 | M | Sundbybergs CK (Vilmer Nygren) | Sundbybergs CK (Jakob Thilmann) | IK Fyris (Jonatan Ölmestrand) |
| Swedish Junior Curling Championships; Umeå, Jan. 3–6 | W | Sundbybergs CK (Moa Dryburgh) | Härnösands CK (Kerstin Skoglund) | Sundbybergs CK (Erika Ryberg) |
| Swedish Men's Curling Championship; Härnösand, Jan. 30 – Feb. 2 | | Amatörföreningen CK (Joel Westerberg) | CK Granit Gävle (Simon Granbom) | Sollefteå CK (Fredrik Nyman); Mjölby AI CF (Axel Landelius) |
| Swedish Women's Curling Championship; Härnösand, Jan. 30 – Feb. 2 | | Mjölby AI (Emma Moberg) | Härnösands CK (Anette Norberg) | Härnösands CK (Johanna Heldin); Sundbybergs CK (Erika Ryberg) |
| Swedish Junior Mixed Doubles Curling Championship; Danderyd, Mar. 7–9 | | Sundbybergs CK (Moa Dryburgh / Vilmer Nygren, coach: Johan Nygren) | IK Fyris (Maja Roxin / Jonatan Meyerson, coach: Simon Olofsson) | Härnösands CK (Märta Claesson / Ivan Almeling, coach: Kerstin Skoglund) |
| Swedish Mixed Curling Championship; Karlstad, Apr. 24–27 | | Svegs CK (Fredrik Nyman) | Sundbybergs CK (Isabella Wranå) | Umeå CK (Johan Nygren) |
| Swedish Wheelchair Curling Championship; Karlstad, Apr. 24–27 | | Jönköpings CC, Jönköping Energi 1 (Viljo Petersson-Dahl) | Jönköpings CC, Jönköping Energi 2 (Rebecka Carlsson) | Karlstads CK, Rullarnas (Åsa Lie) |

=== Switzerland ===
| Event | Gold | Silver | Bronze |
|---|---|---|---|
| Swiss Men's Curling Championship; Bern, Feb. 3–8 | (Canton of Geneva) Yannick Schwaller | (Canton of Glarus) Marco Hösli | (Valais) Kim Schwaller |
| Swiss Women's Curling Championship; Bern, Feb. 3–8 | (Canton of Zug) Corrie Hürlimann | (Canton of Zurich) Xenia Schwaller | (Aargau) Silvana Tirinzoni |
| Swiss Mixed Doubles Curling Championship; Gstaad, Mar. 5–8 | (Aargau) Pätz / Michel | (Canton of Bern) Berset / (Canton of Glarus) Hösli | (Canton of Zug) Engler / Wunderlin |
| Swiss Junior Mixed Doubles Curling Championship; Zug, Mar. 28–30 | Morges 1 Elodie Tschudi / Nathan Dryburgh coach: Thomas Tschalär | Zug-Wetzikon; Jana Soltermann / Felix Lüthold coach: Gregor Obrist | Dübendorf 1 Zoe Schwaller / Livio Ernst coach: Marcel Wettstein |

=== United States ===
| Event | | Gold | Silver | Bronze |
|---|---|---|---|---|
| United States Junior Mixed Doubles Curling Championship; Duluth, Nov. 29 – Dec. 1 | | Heidi Holt / Zachary Brenden | Gianna Johnson / Will Podhradsky | Ella Wendling / Benji Paral |
| United States U18 National Curling Championships; Lafayette, Jan. 9–13 | M | Minnesota Guentzel (Mason Guentzel) | Mid-America Rose (Caiden Rose) | Wisconsin Kadlec (Austin Kadlec) |
| United States U18 National Curling Championships; Lafayette, Jan. 9–13 | W | Minnesota Johnson (Allory Johnson) | Midwest Wendling (Ella Wendling) | GLCA Hollands (Jersey Hollands) |
| United States Wheelchair Mixed Doubles Curling Championship; Villa Park, Jan. 10–13 | | Laura Dwyer / Stephen Emt | Oyuna Uranchimeg / Matt Thums | Pam Wilson / Dan Rose |
| United States Men's Curling Championship; Duluth, Jan. 27 – Feb. 2 | | (Minnesota) Korey Dropkin | (Minnesota) Daniel Casper | (Minnesota) John Shuster |
| United States Women's Curling Championship; Duluth, Jan. 28 – Feb. 2 | | (Minnesota) Tabitha Peterson | (New Hampshire) Elizabeth Cousins | (North Dakota) Christine McMakin |
| United States Mixed Doubles Curling Olympic Trials; Lafayette, Feb. 17–23 | | (Minnesota) Thiesse / Dropkin | (Minnesota) Anderson / Stopera | (Minnesota) Bear / Oldenburg |
| United States Senior Curling Championships; Traverse City, Mar. 3–10 | M | | | |
| United States Senior Curling Championships; Traverse City, Mar. 3–10 | W | | | |
| United States Junior Curling Championships; Bowling Green, Apr. 1–6 | M | | | |
| United States Junior Curling Championships; Bowling Green, Apr. 1–6 | W | | | |

== Tour events ==
=== Teams ===
See: List of teams in the 2024–25 curling season

=== Men's events ===
| Week | Event | Winning skip | Runner-up skip | Purse | Winner's share | Tour | SFM |
|---|---|---|---|---|---|---|---|
| 1 | Obihiro ICE Gold Cup; Obihiro, Japan, Jun. 7–9 | (Japan) Toshiya Iida | (Japan) Yusaku Shibatani | ¥500,000 | ¥300,000 | World Curling Japan | 1.0000 |
| 1 | Morioka Ice Mens Memorial Cup; Morioka, Japan, Jun. 14–16 | (Japan) Hiroki Hasegawa | (Japan) Chikara Segawa | ¥160,000 | ¥80,000 | World Curling Japan | 0.5000 |
| 2 | Wakkanai Midori Challenge Cup; Wakkanai, Japan, Aug. 8–11 | (Japan) Shinya Abe | (Japan) Takumi Maeda | ¥1,700,000 | ¥1,000,000 | Hokkaido Curling | 2.5000 |
| 3 | Baden Masters; Baden, Switzerland, Aug. 15–18 | (Scotland) Bruce Mouat | (Switzerland) Yannick Schwaller | CHF 35,000 | CHF 12,000 | World Curling | 7.0000 |
| 4 | Euro Super Series; Stirling, Scotland, Aug. 21–25 | (Scotland) Bruce Mouat | (Scotland) Ross Whyte | £20,000 | £6,000 | — | 6.0000 |
| 4 | ADVICS Cup; Kitami, Japan, Aug. 22–25 | (Japan) Shinya Abe | (Japan) Riku Yanagisawa | ¥1,700,000 | ¥1,000,000 | Hokkaido Curling | 2.5000 |
| 5 | Oslo Cup; Oslo, Norway, Aug. 29 – Sep. 1 | (Switzerland) Marco Hösli | (Sweden) Niklas Edin | kr 112,000 | kr 40,000 | Nordic Curling | 5.0000 |
| 5 | Icebreaker Challenge; Morris, Manitoba, Aug. 30 – Sep. 1 | (United States) Chase Sinnett | (United States) Ethan Sampson | CA$4,500 | CA$1,800 | Manitoba Curling | 1.5000 |
| 6 | Stu Sells Oakville Tankard; Oakville, Ontario, Sep. 6–9 | (Switzerland) Yannick Schwaller | (Germany) Marc Muskatewitz | CA$30,000 | CA$10,000 | Stu Sells Ontario Curling | 7.0000 |
| 6 | Saville Shootout; Edmonton, Alberta, Sep. 6–9 | (Saskatchewan) Mike McEwen | (Manitoba) Jordon McDonald | CA$25,000 | CA$6,000 | Curling Stadium Alberta Curling | 5.0000 |
| 7 | AMJ Campbell Shorty Jenkins Classic; Cornwall, Ontario, Sep. 11–15 | (Switzerland) Yannick Schwaller | (Scotland) Bruce Mouat | CA$60,000 | CA$15,000 | Ontario Curling | 7.0000 |
| 7 | Alberta Curling Series Major; Beaumont, Alberta, Sep. 12–15 | (Germany) Sixten Totzek | (Saskatchewan) Dustin Kalthoff | CA$28,800 | CA$8,500 | Curling Stadium Alberta Curling | 3.0000 |
| 8 | ATB Okotoks Classic; Okotoks, Alberta, Sep. 19–22 | (Saskatchewan) Mike McEwen | (United States) John Shuster | CA$50,000 | CA$14,000 | Alberta Curling | 5.5000 |
| 8 | KW Fall Classic; Waterloo, Ontario, Sep. 19–22 | (Ontario) John Epping | (Japan) Riku Yanagisawa | CA$11,000 | CA$4,000 | Ontario Curling | 3.0000 |
| 8 | Mother Club Fall Curling Classic; Winnipeg, Manitoba, Sep. 19–22 | (United States) Ethan Sampson | (Manitoba) Riley Smith | CA$7,600 | CA$1,700 | Manitoba Curling | 2.0000 |
| 8 | Match Town Trophy; Jönköping, Sweden, Sep. 19–22 | (Scotland) Cameron Bryce | (Sweden) Fredrik Nyman | kr 48,000 | kr 24,000 | Nordic Curling | 0.5000 |
| 8 | Tournoi Equinoxe Open; Montreal, Quebec, Sep. 20–22 | (Quebec) Don Bowser | (Quebec) François Roberge | CA$8,000 | CA$2,000 | Quebec Provincial Circuit | 0.5000 |
| 9 | Tallinn Mens International Challenger; Tallinn, Estonia, Sep. 26–29 | (Sweden) Fredrik Nyman | (Norway) Andreas Hårstad | €3,000 | €1,200 | World Curling | 2.0000 |
| 9 | Martensville SaskTour Series; Martensville, Saskatchewan, Sep. 27–29 | (Saskatchewan) Kelly Knapp | (Saskatchewan) Aaron Shutra | CA$8,700 | CA$2,245 | Curling Stadium Sask Curling | 2.0000 |
| 9 | Invitation Valleyfield; Salaberry-de-Valleyfield, Quebec, Sep. 26–29 | (Quebec) Julien Tremblay | (Quebec) Tom Wharry | CA$10,000 | CA$3,000 | Quebec Provincial Circuit | 1.0000 |
| 9 | Capital Curling Fall Men's; Ottawa, Ontario, Sep. 27–29 | (Ontario) Jacob Lamb | (Ontario) Matthew Dupuis | CA$6,600 | CA$1,400 | Ontario Curling; Capital Curling | 0.5000 |
| 10 | HearingLife Tour Challenge Tier 1 Charlottetown, Prince Edward Island, Oct. 1–6 | (Scotland) Bruce Mouat | (Newfoundland and Labrador) Brad Gushue | CA$175,000 | CA$35,000 | Grand Slam | 10.0000 |
| 10 | HearingLife Tour Challenge Tier 2 Charlottetown, Prince Edward Island, Oct. 1–6 | (Saskatchewan) Rylan Kleiter | (Norway) Magnus Ramsfjell | CA$60,000 | CA$15,000 | Grand Slam | 5.5000 |
| 10 | Prestige Hotels & Resorts Curling Classic; Vernon, British Columbia, Oct. 4–7 | (China) Xu Xiaoming | (British Columbia) Brent Pierce | CA$28,500 | CA$6,000 | Curling Stadium British Columbia Curling | 2.5000 |
| 10 | Atkins Curling Supplies Classic; Winnipeg, Manitoba, Oct. 4–6 | (Manitoba) Braden Calvert | (United States) Scott Dunnam | CA$9,500 | CA$2,000 | Manitoba Curling | 2.0000 |
| 10 | SwissCurling Prometteurs Cup; Biel, Switzerland, Oct. 4–6 | (Switzerland) Jan Iseli | (Switzerland) Andrin Schnider | CHF 6,000 | CHF 3,000 | — | 1.5000 |
| 11 | Stu Sells Toronto Tankard; Toronto, Ontario, Oct. 10–14 | (Ontario) John Epping | (South Korea) Jeong Byeong-jin | CA$42,000 | CA$12,000 | Stu Sells Ontario Curling | 7.0000 |
| 11 | Regina Highland SaskTour Spiel; Regina, Saskatchewan, Oct. 11–14 | (Saskatchewan) Kelly Knapp | (Saskatchewan) Jason Jacobson | CA$6,780 | CA$1,925 | Sask Curling | 1.5000 |
| 11 | MCT Challenge; Winnipeg, Manitoba, Oct. 11–14 | (Manitoba) Riley Smith | (Manitoba) Brett Walter | CA$6,800 | CA$1,800 | Manitoba Curling | 1.5000 |
| 11 | McKee Homes Fall Curling Classic; Airdrie, Alberta, Oct. 12–14 | (Alberta) Ryan Jacques | (New Zealand) Anton Hood | CA$12,000 | CA$3,200 | Alberta Curling | 1.0000 |
| 11 | Steele Cup Cash; Fredericton, New Brunswick, Oct. 11–13 | (New Brunswick) James Grattan | (Nova Scotia) Stuart Thompson | CA$6,500 | CA$2,000 | — | 0.5000 |
| 11 | Capital Curling Classic; Ottawa, Ontario, Oct. 11–13 | (Quebec) François Roberge | (Ontario) Jacob Lamb | CA$15,000 | CA$1,600 | Ontario Curling; Capital Curling | 0.5000 |
| 12 | Henderson Metal Fall Classic; Sault Ste. Marie, Ontario, Oct. 17–20 | (Manitoba) Matt Dunstone | (Switzerland) Marco Hösli | CA$106,000 | CA$25,000 | Curling Stadium Ontario Curling | 7.0000 |
| 12 | St. Paul Cashspiel; St. Paul, Minnesota, Oct. 18–20 | (United States) Daniel Casper | (United States) Scott Dunnam | US$20,000 | US$6,915 | Ontario Curling | 2.0000 |
| 12 | King Cash Spiel; Maple Ridge, British Columbia, Oct. 17–20 | (British Columbia) Jason Montgomery | (British Columbia) Cameron de Jong | CA$12,800 | CA$4,000 | British Columbia Curling | 1.5000 |
| 12 | Alberta Curling Series: Event 1 Beaumont, Alberta, Oct. 18–20 | (Alberta) Jacob Libbus | (Alberta) Daylan Vavrek | CA$7,500 | CA$3,000 | Curling Stadium Alberta Curling Series | 1.0000 |
| 12 | Stroud Sleeman Cash Spiel; Stroud, Ontario, Oct. 17–20 | (Ontario) Landan Rooney | (Ontario) Jacob Lamb | CA$12,800 | CA$3,800 | Ontario Curling | 1.0000 |
| 13 | Nufloors Penticton Curling Classic; Penticton, British Columbia, Oct. 24–28 | (Alberta) Brad Jacobs | (Ontario) Scott Howard | CA$100,000 | CA$20,000 | British Columbia Curling | 6.0000 |
| 13 | Grand Prix Bern Inter Curling Challenge; Bern, Switzerland, Oct. 25–27 | (Switzerland) Marco Hösli | (Switzerland) Jan Iseli | CHF 18,100 | CHF 5,000 | World Curling | 4.0000 |
| 13 | Dave Jones Stanhope Simpson; Insurance Mayflower Cashspiel; Halifax, Nova Scotia, Oct. 24–27 | (Nova Scotia) Matthew Manuel | (New Brunswick) Rene Comeau | CA$14,000 | CA$4,700 | — | 1.5000 |
| 13 | Sundbyberg Open; Sundbyberg, Sweden, Oct. 24–27 | (Sweden) Axel Landelius | (Denmark) Jacob Schmidt | kr 29,000 | kr 19,000 | Nordic Curling | 0.5000 |
| 14 | Swiss Cup Basel; Arlesheim, Switzerland, Nov. 1–3 | (Czech Republic) Lukáš Klíma | (Scotland) Kyle Waddell | CHF 25,000 | CHF 10,000 | — | 5.0000 |
| 14 | Saville Grand Prix; Edmonton, Alberta, Nov. 1–3 | (United States) Korey Dropkin | (Japan) Takumi Maeda | CA$25,000 | CA$4,000 | Curling Stadium Alberta Curling | 3.0000 |
| 14 | Stu Sells 1824 Halifax Classic; Halifax, Nova Scotia, Oct. 30 – Nov. 3 | (South Korea) Jeong Byeong-jin | (Ontario) Sam Mooibroek | CA$25,500 | CA$8,000 | Stu Sells | 2.5000 |
| 14 | Stu Sells Port Elgin Superspiel; Port Elgin, Ontario, Nov. 1–3 | (South Korea) Park Jong-duk | (Ontario) Jayden King | CA$14,000 | CA$3,000 | Stu Sells Ontario Curling | 2.0000 |
| 14 | MCT Curling Cup; Winnipeg, Manitoba, Nov. 1–3 | (Manitoba) Jordon McDonald | (Manitoba) Devon Wiebe | CA$10,000 | CA$1,975 | Manitoba Curling | 2.0000 |
| 14 | Nutana SaskTour Men's Spiel; Saskatoon, Saskatchewan, Nov. 1–3 | (Saskatchewan) Randy Bryden | (Saskatchewan) Bradley Moser | CA$6,780 | CA$2,050 | Sask Curling | 1.5000 |
| 14 | Challenge Nord-Ouest Air Creebec/Agnico Eagle; Val-d'Or, Quebec, Oct. 31 – Nov. 3 | (Quebec) Pierre-Luc Morissette | (Quebec) Jean-Sébastien Roy | CA$15,000 | CA$3,100 | Quebec Provincial Circuit | 0.5000 |
| 14 | Danish Open; Copenhagen, Denmark, Oct. 31 – Nov. 3 | (Denmark) Jacob Schmidt | (Belgium) Timothy Verreycken | €2,400 | €1,000 | Nordic Curling | 0.5000 |
| 15 | Co-op Canadian Open; Nisku, Alberta, Nov. 5–10 | (Scotland) Bruce Mouat | (Newfoundland and Labrador) Brad Gushue | CA$200,000 | CA$44,000 | Grand Slam | 10.0000 |
| 15 | Original 16 Men's Cash Spiel; Calgary, Alberta, Nov. 9–11 | (Saskatchewan) Dustin Kalthoff | (United States) Ethan Sampson | CA$30,000 | CA$8,000 | Alberta Curling | 3.5000 |
| 15 | Prague Classic; Prague, Czech Republic, Nov. 7–11 | (Sweden) Fredrik Nyman | (Czech Republic) Lukáš Klíma | €13,500 | €4,100 | World Curling | 1.5000 |
| 15 | COMCO Cash Spiel; Stroud, Ontario, Nov. 8–10 | (South Korea) Park Jong-duk | (Ontario) Sam Steep | CA$12,000 | CA$3,000 | Ontario Curling | 1.5000 |
| 15 | Island Shootout; Victoria, British Columbia, Nov. 7–11 | (British Columbia) Jason Montgomery | (British Columbia) Cameron de Jong | CA$18,000 | CA$3,500 | British Columbia Curling | 0.5000 |
| 16 | Red Deer Curling Classic; Red Deer, Alberta, Nov. 15–18 | (Manitoba) Matt Dunstone | (Ontario) John Epping | CA$46,000 | CA$10,000 | Alberta Curling | 5.5000 |
| 16 | Kamloops Crown of Curling; Kamloops, British Columbia, Nov. 15–17 | (British Columbia) Jeff Richard | (British Columbia) Rob Nobert | CA$9,000 | CA$4,000 | British Columbia Curling | 0.5000 |
| 16 | PEI Brewing Company Cashspiel; Summerside, Prince Edward Island, Nov. 15–17 | (Nova Scotia) Kendal Thompson | (Nova Scotia) Brent MacDougall | CA$3,200 | CA$1,600 | — | 0.5000 |
| 16 | Scott Comfort Re/Max Blue Chip Bonspiel; Wadena, Saskatchewan, Nov. 15–17 | (Saskatchewan) Kelly Knapp | (Saskatchewan) Logan Ede | CA$8,025 | CA$1,925 | Sask Curling | 0.5000 |
| 17 | Stu Sells Living Waters Collingwood Classic; Collingwood, Ontario, Nov. 21–24 | (Ontario) John Epping | (Switzerland) Michael Brunner | CA$25,000 | CA$5,700 | Stu Sells Ontario Curling | 4.0000 |
| 17 | DEKALB Superspiel; Morris, Manitoba, Nov. 21–24 | (Manitoba) Braden Calvert | (Manitoba) Brett Walter | CA$30,000 | CA$10,000 | Manitoba Curling | 3.0000 |
| 17 | Challenge de Curling Desjardins; Clermont, Quebec, Nov. 21–24 | (Nova Scotia) Matthew Manuel | (Prince Edward Island) Tyler Smith | CA$28,000 | CA$8,500 | Quebec Provincial Circuit | 1.5000 |
| 17 | Saville U25 Challenge; Edmonton, Alberta, Nov. 22–24 | (Alberta) Benjamin Kiist | (Alberta) Johnson Tao | CA$5,500 | CA$1,800 | Curling Stadium Alberta Curling | 1.0000 |
| 17 | Jim Sullivan Curling Classic; Fredericton, New Brunswick, Nov. 22–24 | (Nova Scotia) Colten Steele | (New Brunswick) James Grattan | CA$11,500 | CA$4,000 | — | 0.5000 |
| 17 | Mile Zero Cash Spiel; Dawson Creek, British Columbia, Nov. 22–24 | (British Columbia) Jason Ginter | (British Columbia) Colby Wilson | CA$16,500 | CA$5,000 | British Columbia Curling | 0.5000 |
| 18 | KIOTI National; St. John's, Newfoundland and Labrador, Nov. 26 – Dec. 1 | (Scotland) Bruce Mouat | (Alberta) Brad Jacobs | CA$200,000 | CA$44,000 | Grand Slam | 10.0000 |
| 18 | Abbotsford Curling Classic; Abbotsford, British Columbia, Nov. 29 – Dec. 1 | (Japan) Shinya Abe | (British Columbia) Jeff Richard | CA$18,000 | CA$6,000 | British Columbia Curling | 2.0000 |
| 18 | MCT Showdown; Stonewall, Manitoba, Nov. 29 – Dec. 1 | (Manitoba) Braden Calvert | (Manitoba) Brett Walter | CA$9,000 | CA$3,000 | Manitoba Curling | 1.5000 |
| 18 | Alberta Curling Series: Event 2 Beaumont, Alberta, Nov. 29 – Dec. 1 | (Alberta) Ryan Jacques | (Alberta) Daylan Vavrek | CA$7,500 | CA$2,400 | Curling Stadium Alberta Curling Series | 1.0000 |
| 18 | Sask Curling Tour – Yorkton; Yorkton, Saskatchewan, Nov. 29 – Dec. 1 | (Saskatchewan) Kelly Knapp | (Saskatchewan) Michael Carss | CA$10,500 | CA$3,000 | Sask Curling | 1.0000 |
| 19 | Stu Sells Brantford NISSAN Classic; Brantford, Ontario, Dec. 6–9 | (Ontario) Sam Mooibroek | (Ontario) Jonathan Beuk | CA$15,000 | CA$5,000 | Stu Sells Ontario Curling | 3.5000 |
| 19 | S3 Group Curling Stadium Series; Swift Current, Saskatchewan, Dec. 6–8 | (Saskatchewan) Kelly Knapp | (Saskatchewan) Steve Laycock | CA$12,000 | CA$2,500 | Curling Stadium Sask Curling | 1.5000 |
| 20 | RBC Dominion Securities Western Showdown; Swift Current, Saskatchewan, Dec. 13–16 | (Alberta) Kevin Koe | (Alberta) Brad Jacobs | CA$50,000 | CA$13,000 | Curling Stadium | 6.5000 |
| 20 | Karuizawa International; Karuizawa, Japan, Dec. 12–15 | (Germany) Marc Muskatewitz | (Japan) Tsuyoshi Yamaguchi | ¥1,500,000 | ¥800,000 | — | 5.0000 |
| 20 | MCT Shootout; Virden, Manitoba, Dec. 13–15 | (Manitoba) Braden Calvert | (Manitoba) Kelly Marnoch | CA$7,000 | CA$2,000 | Manitoba Curling | 1.0000 |
| 20 | Superstore Monctonian Challenge; Moncton, New Brunswick, Dec. 13–15 | (New Brunswick) Scott Jones | (Nova Scotia) Kendal Thompson | CA$12,400 | CA$2,000 | — | 0.5000 |
| 20 | WCT Łódź Men's International; Łódź, Poland, Dec. 13–15 | (Czech Republic) Tomáš Paul | (Czech Republic) Vít Chabičovský | €4,000 | €1,600 | World Curling | 0.5000 |
| 20 | Rick Rowsell Classic; St. John's, Newfoundland and Labrador, Dec. 12–15 | (Newfoundland and Labrador) Simon Perry | (Newfoundland and Labrador) Andrew Symonds | CA$13,000 | CA$4,000 | — | 0.5000 |
| 21 | WCT Take-Out Trophy; Basel, Switzerland, Dec. 20–22 | (Switzerland) Michael Brunner | (Switzerland) Marco Hösli | CHF 17,000 | CHF 8,000 | World Curling | 4.0000 |
| 21 | Duluth Cash Spiel; Duluth, Minnesota, Dec. 20–22 | (Ontario) John Epping | (Manitoba) Jordon McDonald | US$22,000 | US$6,500 | Ontario Curling | 3.0000 |
| 23 | Mercure Perth Masters; Perth, Scotland, Jan. 3–6 | (Scotland) Orrin Carson | (Scotland) Glen Muirhead | £38,250 | £8,000 | — | 4.0000 |
| 23 | MCT Championships; Winnipeg, Manitoba, Jan. 3–5 | (Manitoba) Braden Calvert | (Manitoba) Jordan Peters | CA$10,000 | CA$2,500 | Manitoba Curling | 1.5000 |
| 23 | Classic Baie d'Urfe; Baie-D'Urfé, Quebec, Jan. 2–5 | (Quebec) Félix Asselin | (Quebec) Dan Élie | CA$5,600 | CA$1,420 | Quebec Provincial Circuit | 0.5000 |
| 23 | Performance Kia Charity Open; Thunder Bay, Ontario, Jan. 3–5 | (Ontario) Krista McCarville* | (Ontario) Brian Adams Jr. | CA$16,000 | CA$4,000 | Ontario Curling | 0.5000 |
| 24 | Astec Safety Challenge; Lloydminster, Saskatchewan, Jan. 8–11 | (Manitoba) Matt Dunstone | (Saskatchewan) Mike McEwen | CA$125,000 | CA$35,000 | Players | 7.0000 |
| 24 | Ed Werenich Golden Wrench Classic; Tempe, Arizona, Jan. 9–12 | (Ontario) John Epping | (United States) John Shuster | US$24,000 | US$10,000 | — | 4.0000 |
| 24 | Crestwood Platinum Anniversary Showdown; Edmonton, Alberta, Jan. 10–13 | (Alberta) Evan van Amsterdam | (Alberta) Andrew Dunbar | CA$7,000 | CA$3,000 | — | 1.0000 |
| 24 | Richmond Warm-Up Spiel; Richmond, British Columbia, Jan. 10–11 | (British Columbia) Glenn Venance | (British Columbia) Jared Kolomaya | CA$4,000 | CA$2,000 | British Columbia Curling | 1.0000 |
| 25 | WFG Masters; Guelph, Ontario, Jan. 14–19 | (Scotland) Ross Whyte | (Alberta) Brad Jacobs | CA$200,000 | CA$38,000 | Grand Slam | 10.0000 |
| 26 | WCT Belgium Men's Challenge; Zemst, Belgium, Jan. 23–26 | (China) Xu Xiaoming | (Belgium) Timothy Verreycken | €2,800 | €1,300 | World Curling | 1.0000 |
| 26 | Dartmouth Cash Spiel; Dartmouth, Nova Scotia, Jan. 24–26 | (Nova Scotia) William Russell | (Nova Scotia) Doug MacKenzie | CA$4,000 | | — | 0.5000 |
| 30 | Sun City Cup; Karlstad, Sweden, Feb. 20–23 | (Scotland) James Craik | (Switzerland) Jan Iseli | kr 55,000 | kr 25,000 | Nordic Curling | 4.0000 |
| 33 | Aberdeen International Curling Championship; Aberdeen, Scotland, Mar. 14–16 | (Scotland) Cameron Bryce | (Scotland) James Craik | £6,000 | £2,500 | — | 5.0000 |
| 33 | Martensville International; Martensville, Saskatchewan, Mar. 14–16 | (United States) Korey Dropkin | (Ontario) Scott Howard | CA$21,000 | CA$8,000 | Curling Stadium Sask Curling | 4.5000 |
| 34 | Speedy Creek Shootout; Swift Current, Saskatchewan, Mar. 20–23 | (Saskatchewan) Rylan Kleiter | (Manitoba) Jordon McDonald | CA$25,000 | CA$7,000 | Sask Curling | 4.5000 |
| 37 | AMJ Players' Championship; Toronto, Ontario, Apr. 8–13 | (Scotland) Bruce Mouat | (Switzerland) Yannick Schwaller | CA$175,000 | CA$40,000 | Grand Slam | 10.0000 |

* Women's team.

=== Women's events ===
| Week | Event | Winning skip | Runner-up skip | Purse | Winner's share | Tour | SFM |
|---|---|---|---|---|---|---|---|
| 1 | Obihiro ICE Gold Cup; Obihiro, Japan, Jun. 7–9 | (Japan) Miku Nihira | (Japan) Wakaba Kawamura | ¥950,000 | ¥500,000 | World Curling Japan | 1.0000 |
| 2 | Wakkanai Midori Challenge Cup; Wakkanai, Japan, Aug. 8–11 | (Japan) Ikue Kitazawa | (Japan) Sayaka Yoshimura | ¥1,700,000 | ¥1,000,000 | Hokkaido Curling | 2.5000 |
| 4 | ADVICS Cup; Kitami, Japan, Aug. 22–25 | (Japan) Sayaka Yoshimura | (Japan) Ikue Kitazawa | ¥1,700,000 | ¥1,000,000 | Hokkaido Curling | 4.0000 |
| 4 | Euro Super Series; Stirling, Scotland, Aug. 21–25 | (Scotland) Fay Henderson | (Italy) Stefania Constantini | £20,000 | £6,000 | — | 3.5000 |
| 5 | Oslo Cup; Oslo, Norway, Aug. 29 – Sep. 1 | (Sweden) Anna Hasselborg | (Switzerland) Xenia Schwaller | kr 88,000 | kr 40,000 | Nordic Curling | 4.5000 |
| 5 | Argo Graphics Cup; Kitami, Japan, Aug. 29 – Sep. 1 | (Japan) Miku Nihira | (Japan) Satsuki Fujisawa | ¥1,700,000 | ¥1,000,000 | Hokkaido Curling | 4.5000 |
| 5 | Icebreaker Challenge; Morris, Manitoba, Aug. 30 – Sep. 1 | (Saskatchewan) Ashley Thevenot | (Alberta) Kayla Skrlik | CA$4,500 | CA$1,800 | Manitoba Curling | 2.5000 |
| 6 | Saville Shootout; Edmonton, Alberta, Sep. 6–9 | (Japan) Miku Nihira | (Japan) Satsuki Fujisawa | CA$25,000 | CA$6,000 | Curling Stadium Alberta Curling | 6.5000 |
| 6 | Stu Sells Oakville Tankard; Oakville, Ontario, Sep. 6–9 | (Switzerland) Xenia Schwaller | (Alberta) Kayla Skrlik | CA$30,000 | CA$8,000 | Stu Sells Ontario Curling | 6.0000 |
| 6 | Sutherland SaskTour Icebreaker; Saskatoon, Saskatchewan, Sep. 6–8 | (Saskatchewan) Sherrilee Orsted | (Saskatchewan) Ashley Thevenot | CA$6,000 | CA$1,500 | Sask Curling | 1.5000 |
| 7 | AMJ Campbell Shorty Jenkins Classic; Cornwall, Ontario, Sep. 11–15 | (Ontario) Rachel Homan | (Switzerland) Silvana Tirinzoni | CA$45,000 | CA$12,000 | Ontario Curling | 6.5000 |
| 8 | Women's Masters Basel; Arlesheim, Switzerland, Sep. 20–22 | (Switzerland) Silvana Tirinzoni | (Sweden) Anna Hasselborg | CHF 35,000 | CHF 11,000 | — | 5.0000 |
| 8 | Mother Club Fall Curling Classic; Winnipeg, Manitoba, Sep. 19–22 | (Japan) Miyu Ueno | (Ontario) Krista McCarville | CA$7,600 | CA$2,500 | Manitoba Curling | 4.0000 |
| 8 | Alberta Curling Series Major; Beaumont, Alberta, Sep. 19–22 | (South Korea) Gim Eun-ji | (Manitoba) Kate Cameron | CA$18,000 | CA$6,300 | Curling Stadium Alberta Curling | 3.5000 |
| 8 | KW Fall Classic; Waterloo, Ontario, Sep. 19–22 | (Ontario) Breanna Rozon | (South Korea) Kim Eun-jung | CA$8,500 | CA$3,300 | Ontario Curling | 3.5000 |
| 9 | Sutherland SaskTour Spiel; Saskatoon, Saskatchewan, Sep. 27–29 | (Saskatchewan) Penny Barker | (Saskatchewan) Michelle Englot | CA$6,000 | CA$1,500 | Sask Curling | 2.0000 |
| 9 | Prague Ladies International; Prague, Czech Republic, Sep. 27–29 | (Germany) Sara Messenzehl | (Czech Republic) Hana Synáčková | CHF 7,500 | €2,200 | World Curling | 1.5000 |
| 9 | Riga International Curling Challenge; Riga, Latvia, Sep. 27–29 | (Latvia) Katrīna Gaidule | (Latvia) Evelīna Barone | €1,800 | €1,000 | — | 0.5000 |
| 10 | HearingLife Tour Challenge Tier 1 Charlottetown, Prince Edward Island, Oct. 1–6 | (Manitoba) Kerri Einarson | (Ontario) Rachel Homan | CA$175,000 | CA$20,000 | Grand Slam | 10.0000 |
| 10 | HearingLife Tour Challenge Tier 2 Charlottetown, Prince Edward Island, Oct. 1–6 | (Nova Scotia) Christina Black | (Japan) Sayaka Yoshimura | CA$60,000 | CA$7,000 | Grand Slam | 5.5000 |
| 10 | Prestige Hotels & Resorts Curling Classic; Vernon, British Columbia, Oct. 4–6 | (South Korea) Kang Bo-bae | (China) Zhang Yujie | CA$28,500 | CA$6,000 | Curling Stadium British Columbia Curling | 2.0000 |
| 10 | Atkins Curling Supplies Classic; Winnipeg, Manitoba, Oct. 4–6 | (South Korea) Kim Su-hyeon | (Manitoba) Darcy Robertson | CA$8,700 | CA$1,800 | Manitoba Curling | 1.5000 |
| 10 | Superstore Lady Monctonian; Moncton, New Brunswick, Oct. 4–6 | (New Brunswick) Sylvie Quillian | (Nova Scotia) Kristen MacDiarmid | CA$6,000 | CA$2,100 | — | 1.0000 |
| 11 | Curlers Corner Autumn Gold Curling Classic; Calgary, Alberta, Oct. 11–14 | (South Korea) Gim Eun-ji | (China) Wang Rui | CA$45,000 | CA$12,300 | Alberta Curling | 6.5000 |
| 11 | Stu Sells Toronto Tankard; Toronto, Ontario, Oct. 10–14 | (South Korea) Kim Eun-jung | (Switzerland) Silvana Tirinzoni | CA$40,000 | CA$10,000 | Stu Sells Ontario Curling | 6.0000 |
| 11 | Tallinn Ladies International Challenger; Tallinn, Estonia, Oct. 10–13 | (Turkey) Dilşat Yıldız | (Estonia) Liisa Turmann | €3,000 | €1,200 | — | 2.0000 |
| 11 | Regina Highland Rocksgiving; Regina, Saskatchewan, Oct. 11–14 | (Saskatchewan) Mandy Selzer | (Saskatchewan) Jana Tisdale | CA$6,800 | CA$1,600 | Sask Curling | 2.0000 |
| 11 | MCT Challenge; Winnipeg, Manitoba, Oct. 11–14 | (Manitoba) Lisa McLeod | (South Korea) Kim Su-hyeon | CA$5,800 | CA$1,700 | Manitoba Curling | 1.5000 |
| 11 | Steele Cup Cash; Fredericton, New Brunswick, Oct. 11–13 | (Nova Scotia) Christina Black | (New Brunswick) Melissa Adams | CA$4,800 | CA$2,000 | — | 1.0000 |
| 12 | Alberta Curling Series: Event 1 Beaumont, Alberta, Oct. 18–20 | (South Korea) Park You-been | (Manitoba) Kate Cameron | CA$12,500 | CA$4,000 | Curling Stadium Alberta Curling Series | 3.0000 |
| 12 | St. Paul Cashspiel; St. Paul, Minnesota, Oct. 18–20 | (United States) Courtney Benson | (United States) Elizabeth Cousins | US$20,000 | US$6,915 | Ontario Curling | 2.0000 |
| 12 | Stroud Sleeman Cash Spiel; Stroud, Ontario, Oct. 17–20 | (Ontario) Shelley Hardy | (Ontario) Chelsea Brandwood | CA$12,800 | CA$3,800 | Ontario Curling | 1.5000 |
| 12 | King Cash Spiel; Maple Ridge, British Columbia, Oct. 17–20 | (British Columbia) Kristen Ryan | (British Columbia) Shiella Cowan | CA$9,600 | CA$3,200 | British Columbia Curling | 1.0000 |
| 13 | Martensville International; Martensville, Saskatchewan, Oct. 24–27 | (Alberta) Kayla Skrlik | (Saskatchewan) Amber Holland | CA$32,000 | CA$12,000 | Curling Stadium Sask Curling | 3.5000 |
| 13 | Sundbyberg Open; Sundbyberg, Sweden, Oct. 24–27 | (Denmark) Madeleine Dupont | (Sweden) Anna Hasselborg | kr 29,000 | kr 19,000 | Nordic Curling | 2.5000 |
| 13 | Dave Jones Stanhope Simpson; Insurance Mayflower Cashspiel; Halifax, Nova Scotia, Oct. 24–27 | (Nova Scotia) Christina Black | (New Brunswick) Melissa Adams | CA$8,800 | CA$2,500 | — | 1.5000 |
| 14 | Saville Grand Prix; Edmonton, Alberta, Nov. 1–3 | (Manitoba) Kerri Einarson | (South Korea) Ha Seung-youn | CA$25,000 | CA$6,000 | Curling Stadium Alberta Curling | 7.0000 |
| 14 | Stu Sells 1824 Halifax Classic; Halifax, Nova Scotia, Oct. 30 – Nov. 3 | (Scotland) Sophie Jackson | (Nova Scotia) Christina Black | CA$19,125 | CA$6,000 | Stu Sells | 4.0000 |
| 14 | Danish Open; Copenhagen, Denmark, Oct. 31 – Nov. 3 | (Denmark) Madeleine Dupont | (Turkey) Dilşat Yıldız | €9,000 | €3,000 | Nordic Curling | 2.5000 |
| 14 | Nutana SaskTour Women's Spiel; Saskatoon, Saskatchewan, Nov. 1–3 | (Saskatchewan) Ashley Thevenot | (Saskatchewan) Mandy Selzer | CA$8,000 | CA$1,800 | Sask Curling | 2.5000 |
| 14 | MCT Curling Cup; Winnipeg, Manitoba, Nov. 1–3 | (Manitoba) Sarah-Jane Sass | (Manitoba) Beth Peterson | CA$10,000 | CA$1,975 | Manitoba Curling | 2.0000 |
| 14 | North Grenville Women's Fall Curling Classic; Kemptville, Ontario, Oct. 31 – Nov. 3 | Cancelled | | | | | |
| 15 | Co-op Canadian Open; Nisku, Alberta, Nov. 5–10 | (Ontario) Rachel Homan | (Switzerland) Silvana Tirinzoni | CA$200,000 | CA$44,000 | Grand Slam | 10.0000 |
| 15 | Swiss Chalet Women's Curling Stadium Spiel; North Bay, Ontario, Nov. 8–10 | (Quebec) Laurie St-Georges | (Ontario) Chelsea Brandwood | CA$12,000 | CA$3,000 | Curling Stadium Ontario Curling | 3.0000 |
| 15 | Ladies Alberta Open; Okotoks, Alberta, Nov. 8–11 | (Alberta) Kayla Skrlik | (Japan) Yuina Miura | CA$12,200 | CA$3,200 | Alberta Curling | 2.0000 |
| 15 | Island Shootout; Victoria, British Columbia, Nov. 7–11 | (British Columbia) Taylor Reese-Hansen | (British Columbia) Steph Jackson-Baier | CA$5,000 | CA$2,000 | British Columbia Curling | 1.0000 |
| 16 | Red Deer Curling Classic; Red Deer, Alberta, Nov. 15–18 | (Japan) Miku Nihira | (Japan) Satsuki Fujisawa | CA$39,000 | CA$10,000 | Alberta Curling | 6.5000 |
| 16 | Kamloops Crown of Curling; Kamloops, British Columbia, Nov. 15–17 | (British Columbia) Steph Jackson-Baier | (Japan) Yuina Miura | CA$8,000 | CA$3,000 | British Columbia Curling | 0.5000 |
| 17 | DEKALB Superspiel; Morris, Manitoba, Nov. 21–24 | (South Korea) Kang Bo-bae | (South Korea) Kim Eun-jung | CA$30,000 | CA$10,000 | Manitoba Curling | 5.0000 |
| 17 | Stu Sells Living Waters Collingwood Classic; Collingwood, Ontario, Nov. 21–24 | (Ontario) Krista McCarville | (Ontario) Hollie Duncan | CA$25,000 | CA$5,700 | Stu Sells Ontario Curling | 3.0000 |
| 17 | Saville U25 Challenge; Edmonton, Alberta, Nov. 22–24 | (Japan) Miku Nihira | (Japan) Yuina Miura | CA$5,500 | CA$1,800 | Curling Stadium Alberta Curling | 2.5000 |
| 17 | Moose Jaw SaskTour Spiel; Moose Jaw, Saskatchewan, Nov. 22–24 | (Saskatchewan) Penny Barker | (Saskatchewan) Michelle Englot | CA$9,600 | CA$1,600 | Sask Curling | 2.0000 |
| 17 | Jim Sullivan Curling Classic; Fredericton, New Brunswick, Nov. 22–24 | (New Brunswick) Sarah Mallais | (New Brunswick) Mélodie Forsythe | CA$10,000 | CA$3,000 | — | 1.0000 |
| 17 | Challenge de Curling Desjardins; Charlevoix, Quebec, Nov. 21–24 | (Quebec) Nathalie Gagnon | (Quebec) Émilia Gagné | — | | Quebec Provincial Circuit | 0.5000 |
| 18 | KIOTI National; St. John's, Newfoundland and Labrador, Nov. 26 – Dec. 1 | (Ontario) Rachel Homan | (Sweden) Anna Hasselborg | CA$200,000 | CA$44,000 | Grand Slam | 10.0000 |
| 18 | Alberta Curling Series: Event 2 Beaumont, Alberta, Nov. 29 – Dec. 1 | (Alberta) Serena Gray-Withers | (Saskatchewan) Ashley Thevenot | CA$7,500 | CA$2,400 | Curling Stadium Alberta Curling Series | 2.0000 |
| 18 | MCT Showdown; Stonewall, Manitoba, Nov. 29 – Dec. 1 | (South Korea) Kang Bo-bae | (Manitoba) Beth Peterson | CA$6,750 | CA$2,500 | Manitoba Curling | 2.0000 |
| 18 | Abbotsford Curling Classic; Abbotsford, British Columbia, Nov. 29 – Dec. 1 | (Switzerland) Corrie Hürlimann | (Japan) Ikue Kitazawa | CA$13,000 | CA$5,500 | British Columbia Curling | 1.5000 |
| 19 | Stu Sells Brantford NISSAN Classic; Brantford, Ontario, Dec. 6–9 | (Nova Scotia) Christina Black | (Ontario) Breanna Rozon | CA$15,000 | CA$5,000 | Stu Sells Ontario Curling | 3.0000 |
| 19 | S3 Group Curling Stadium Series; Swift Current, Saskatchewan, Dec. 6–8 | (Switzerland) Xenia Schwaller | (South Korea) Kang Bo-bae | CA$12,000 | CA$3,000 | Curling Stadium Sask Curling | 3.0000 |
| 20 | RBC Dominion Securities Western Showdown; Swift Current, Saskatchewan, Dec. 12–15 | (Switzerland) Xenia Schwaller | (Saskatchewan) Michelle Englot | CA$50,000 | CA$12,000 | Curling Stadium | 6.0000 |
| 20 | Karuizawa International; Karuizawa, Japan, Dec. 13–15 | (Japan) Sayaka Yoshimura | (Sweden) Anna Hasselborg | ¥1,500,000 | ¥800,000 | — | 5.5000 |
| 20 | Rick Rowsell Classic; St. John's, Newfoundland and Labrador, Dec. 12–15 | (Newfoundland and Labrador) Brooke Godsland | (Newfoundland and Labrador) Sarah Boland | CA$6,000 | CA$3,000 | — | 0.5000 |
| 21 | WCT Take-Out Trophy; Basel, Switzerland, Dec. 20–22 | (Sweden) Isabella Wranå | (Japan) Ikue Kitazawa | CHF 13,000 | CHF 6,000 | World Curling | 2.5000 |
| 21 | Duluth Cash Spiel; Duluth, Minnesota, Dec. 20–22 | (United States) Courtney Benson | (Ontario) Robyn Despins | US$10,000 | US$3,000 | Ontario Curling | 2.0000 |
| 23 | Mercure Perth Masters; Perth, Scotland, Jan. 3–6 | (Switzerland) Xenia Schwaller | (China) Wang Rui | £15,900 | £3,500 | — | 3.5000 |
| 23 | MCT Championships; Winnipeg, Manitoba, Jan. 3–5 | (Manitoba) Beth Peterson | (Manitoba) Sarah-Jane Sass | CA$10,000 | CA$2,500 | Manitoba Curling | 2.0000 |
| 23 | New Year Curling in Miyota; Miyota, Japan, Dec. 29 – Jan. 1 | (Japan) Miyu Ueno | (Japan) Moka Tanaka | ¥2,000,000 | ¥1,000,000 | World Curling Japan | 1.5000 |
| 24 | Crestwood Platinum Anniversary Showdown; Edmonton, Alberta, Jan. 10–13 | (Alberta) Selena Sturmay | (British Columbia) Corryn Brown | CA$14,000 | CA$4,000 | — | 3.5000 |
| 25 | WFG Masters; Guelph, Ontario, Jan. 14–19 | (Sweden) Anna Hasselborg | (Ontario) Rachel Homan | CA$200,000 | CA$26,000 | Grand Slam | 10.0000 |
| 26 | International Bernese Ladies Cup; Bern, Switzerland, Jan. 23–26 | (Switzerland) Silvana Tirinzoni | (Switzerland) Xenia Schwaller | CHF 20,000 | CHF 5,000 | World Curling | 5.0000 |
| 26 | Dartmouth Cash Spiel; Dartmouth, Nova Scotia, Jan. 24–26 | (Nova Scotia) Tanya Phillips | (Nova Scotia) Andrea Saulnier | CA$4,000 | | — | 0.5000 |
| 30 | Sun City Cup; Karlstad, Sweden, Feb. 20–23 | (Sweden) Isabella Wranå | (Switzerland) Xenia Schwaller | kr 55,000 | kr 25,000 | Nordic Curling | 4.0000 |
| 32 | Gangneung Invitational; Gangneung, South Korea, Mar. 6–9 | (South Korea) Kim Eun-jung | (Japan) Sayaka Yoshimura | CA$35,000 | CA$15,000 | — | 5.5000 |
| 37 | AMJ Players' Championship; Toronto, Ontario, Apr. 8–13 | (Switzerland) Silvana Tirinzoni | (Ontario) Rachel Homan | CA$175,000 | CA$40,000 | Grand Slam | 10.0000 |

=== Mixed doubles events ===
| Week | Event | Winning Team | Runner-up Team | Purse | Winner's share | Tour | SFM |
|---|---|---|---|---|---|---|---|
| 4 | Enns Bros Mixed Doubles Classic; Morris, Manitoba, Aug. 23–25 | (Manitoba) Lott / Lott | (Manitoba) Arbuckle / Macdonell | CA$3,000 | CA$1,200 | Manitoba Mixed Doubles Curling | 1.0000 |
| 6 | Mixed Doubles Prague Open; Prague, Czech Republic, Sep. 5–8 | (Germany) Tiuliakova / Totzek | (Poland) Lipińska / Stych | €3,500 | €1,100 | World Curling | 1.5000 |
| 6 | SaskTour Mixed Doubles: Sutherland; Saskatoon, Saskatchewan, Sep. 6–8 | (Alberta) Homan / Bottcher | (Saskatchewan) LaMontagne / LaMontagne | CA$3,000 | CA$1,200 | Curling Stadium Sask Curling | 1.0000 |
| 7 | WCT Tallinn Mixed Doubles International; Tallinn, Estonia, Sep. 12–15 | (Czech Republic) Zelingrová / Chabičovský | (Norway) Skaslien / Nedregotten | €3,400 | €1,400 | World Curling | 4.5000 |
| 8 | Mixed Doubles Super Series: Calgary; Calgary, Alberta, Sep. 19–22 | (Estonia) Kaldvee / Lill | (Alberta) Walker / (Saskatchewan) Muyres | CA$18,000 | CA$6,000 | Super Series | 5.5000 |
| 8 | GOLDLINE Mixed Doubles Jacques Cartier; Quebec City, Quebec, Sep. 20–22 | (Newfoundland and Labrador) Wiseman / Smith | (Quebec) Gionest / Desjardins | CA$4,000 | CA$1,500 | Circuit Goldline | 2.0000 |
| 8 | Victoria Mixed Doubles Cash Spiel; Victoria, British Columbia, Sep. 20–22 | (British Columbia) Harris / Chester | (British Columbia) Mackenzie / Middleton | CA$8,000 | CA$2,100 | British Columbia Curling | 1.5000 |
| 9 | Mixed Doubles Super Series: Vernon; Vernon, British Columbia, Sep. 28–30 | (Australia) Gill / Hewitt | (Norway) Skaslien / Nedregotten | CA$18,000 | CA$6,000 | Super Series | 5.0000 |
| 9 | Colorado Curling Cup; Lafayette, Colorado, Sep. 27–29 | (United States) Thiesse / Dropkin | (Saskatchewan) Martin / Laycock | US$16,000 | US$4,000 | World Curling | 3.0000 |
| 9 | Dixie Mixed Doubles Cup; Mississauga, Ontario, Sep. 28–29 | (Ontario) Sandham / Craig | (Ontario) Neil / McDonald | CA$8,700 | CA$2,000 | Ontario Mixed Doubles Curling | 2.0000 |
| 10 | Aly Jenkins Mixed Doubles Memorial; Martensville, Saskatchewan, Oct. 3–6 | (Japan) Koana / Aoki | (Saskatchewan) Martin / Laycock | CA$8,400 | CA$2,400 | Curling Stadium Sask Curling | 3.5000 |
| 10 | GOLDLINE Victoria Mixed Doubles; Quebec City, Quebec, Oct. 4–6 | (Ontario) Zheng / Pietrangelo | (New Brunswick) Parmiter / Burgess | CA$5,000 | CA$1,200 | Circuit Goldline | 3.0000 |
| 11 | WCT Austrian Mixed Doubles Cup; Kitzbühel, Austria, Oct. 10–13 | (Italy) Scalesse / Pimpini | (Sweden) Nilsson / Olofsson | €3,200 | €1,200 | World Curling | 1.0000 |
| 12 | Mixed Doubles Bern; Bern, Switzerland, Oct. 18–20 | (Scotland) Morrison / Lammie | (Scotland) Dodds / Mouat | CHF 10,000 | CHF 3,000 | — | 5.5000 |
| 12 | Mixed Doubles Gstaad; Gstaad, Switzerland, Oct. 14–16 | (Scotland) Dodds / Mouat | (Norway) Skaslien / Nedregotten | CHF 8,000 | CHF 3,000 | — | 5.0000 |
| 12 | Saville Series Mixed Doubles; Edmonton, Alberta, Oct. 18–20 | (Australia) Gill / Hewitt | (Alberta) Papley / van Amsterdam | CA$11,000 | CA$2,750 | Curling Stadium Alberta Curling | 3.5000 |
| 12 | Keith Martin Memorial Mixed Doubles; Arthur, Ontario, Oct. 18–20 | (Ontario) Sandham / Craig | (Ontario) Jones / Laing | CA$6,500 | CA$1,500 | Ontario Mixed Doubles Curling | 2.0000 |
| 12 | GOLDLINE Mixed Doubles Mont-Bruno; Saint-Bruno-de-Montarville, Quebec, Oct. 18–20 | (Quebec) Fellmann / Kovalchuk | (Quebec) Laplante / Gibeau | CA$4,000 | CA$1,000 | Circuit Goldline | 2.0000 |
| 12 | John Ross & Sons Mixed Doubles Spiel; Halifax, Nova Scotia, Oct. 18–20 | (Nova Scotia) Powers / Saunders | (Nova Scotia) Skiffington / MacIsaac | CA$4,800 | CA$1,200 | — | 1.0000 |
| 13 | Northern Credit Union; Mixed Doubles Open; Sudbury, Ontario, Oct. 25–27 | (Japan) Matsumura / Tanida | (Ontario) Smith / Thomson | CA$6,200 | CA$1,500 | Ontario Mixed Doubles Curling | 1.5000 |
| 14 | Palmerston Mixed Doubles Spiel; Palmerston, Ontario, Nov. 1–3 | (Ontario) Weeks / Steep | (Ontario) Ford / Campbell | CA$7,000 | CA$2,000 | Ontario Mixed Doubles Curling | 1.5000 |
| 14 | WCT Latvian Mixed Doubles Curling Cup 1 Riga, Latvia, Oct. 31 – Nov. 2 | (Latvia) Gaidule / Buncis | (Latvia) Barone / Zass | €1,000 | €400 | World Curling | 0.5000 |
| 15 | Mixed Doubles Super Series: Winnipeg; Winnipeg, Manitoba, Nov. 7–10 | (Japan) Koana / Aoki | (Sweden) Westman / Ahlberg | CA$17,000 | CA$6,000 | Super Series | 3.0000 |
| 15 | Royal Kingston Mixed Doubles Cashspiel; Kingston, Ontario, Nov. 9–10 | (Ontario) Weagle / Epping | (Ontario) Kiemele / Singer | CA$6,500 | CA$1,500 | Ontario Mixed Doubles Curling | 2.5000 |
| 15 | WCT Mixed Doubles Łódź; Łódź, Poland, Nov. 7–10 | (Germany) Abbes / Harsch | (Turkey) Yıldız / Çakır | €3,500 | €1,000 | World Curling | 2.0000 |
| 15 | GOLDLINE Omnium Serviciers; Financiers Richard April; Rivière-du-Loup, Quebec, Nov. 8–10 | (Nova Scotia) Powers / Saunders | (New Brunswick) Adams / Robichaud | CA$4,000 | CA$800 | Circuit Goldline | 2.0000 |
| 16 | Mixed Doubles Super Series: Moose Jaw; Moose Jaw, Saskatchewan, Nov. 14–17 | (Australia) Gill / Hewitt | (China) Han / Wang | CA$20,000 | CA$6,000 | Super Series | 4.0000 |
| 16 | HARDLINE Sherbrooke Mixed Doubles; Sherbrooke, Quebec, Nov. 15–17 | (Quebec) Cheal / Cheal | (Ontario) Smith / Thompson | CA$6,500 | CA$1,500 | — | 1.0000 |
| 16 | Ilderton Mixed Doubles Spiel; Ilderton, Ontario, Nov. 16–17 | (Ontario) Neil / McDonald | (Ontario) Cave / King | CA$4,000 | | Ontario Mixed Doubles Curling | 1.0000 |
| 16 | Parksville Double Doubles Spiel; Parksville, British Columbia, Nov. 14–17 | (British Columbia) Reese-Hansen / Chester | (British Columbia) McGillivray / Cowan | CA$7,900 | CA$2,050 | British Columbia Curling | 0.5000 |
| 17 | Madtown Doubledown; McFarland, Wisconsin, Nov. 22–24 | (Estonia) Kaldvee / Lill | (Australia) Gill / Hewitt | US$26,000 | US$6,800 | World Curling | 4.5000 |
| 17 | Alberta Curling Series Doubles: Event 1 Beaumont, Alberta, Nov. 22–24 | (Alberta) Sluchinski / Sluchinski | (China) Han / Wang | CA$4,375 | CA$1,375 | Alberta Curling Series | 1.5000 |
| 18 | North Bay Mixed Doubles; North Bay, Ontario, Nov. 28 – Dec. 1 | (Ontario) Brunton / Forget | (Ontario) Heggestad / Heggestad | CA$5,700 | CA$1,200 | Curling Stadium Ontario Mixed Doubles Curling | 2.5000 |
| 19 | St. Marys Mixed Doubles; St. Marys, Ontario, Dec. 6–8 | (Ontario) Sandham / Craig | (Ontario) Liscumb / Liscumb | CA$6,000 | CA$1,500 | Ontario Mixed Doubles | 1.5000 |
| 20 | Cincinnati Mixed Doubles Cup; Cincinnati, Ohio, Dec. 12–15 | (Ontario) Neil / McDonald | (United States) Bush / Philips | US$6,400 | US$1,800 | World Curling | 0.5000 |
| 20 | Alberta Curling Series Doubles: Event 2 Beaumont, Alberta, Dec. 13–15 | Cancelled | | | | | |
| 21 | St. Thomas Mixed Doubles Classic; St. Thomas, Ontario, Dec. 20–22 | (Ontario) Ford / Krowchuk | (Ontario) Jones / Laing | CA$7,000 | CA$1,800 | Ontario Mixed Doubles Curling | 2.5000 |
| 22 | Gothenburg Mixed Doubles Cup; Gothenburg, Sweden, Dec. 28–30 | (Scotland) Dodds / Mouat | (Estonia) Kaldvee / Lill | kr 75,000 | kr 35,000 | World Curling | 6.5000 |
| 23 | Southern Mixed Doubles; Charlotte, North Carolina, Dec. 28–31 | (United States) Gourianova / Vidaurrazaga | (United States) Pfier / Pfier | US$10,500 | US$3,000 | World Curling | 0.5000 |
| 24 | Ontario Mixed Doubles Tour Championship; Cambridge, Ontario, Jan. 10–12 | (Ontario) Sandham / Craig | (Ontario) Wasylkiw / Konings | CA$6,300 | CA$1,200 | Ontario Mixed Doubles Curling | 2.5000 |
| 25 | Jamaica Cup Mixed Doubles Cashspiel; Dundas, Ontario, Jan. 18–19 | (Australia) Gill / Hewitt | (Ontario) Wasylkiw / Konings | CA$5,000 | CA$1,000 | Caribbean Cup Mixed Doubles Series | 3.0000 |
| 26 | Mixed Doubles Super Series: Fredericton; Fredericton, New Brunswick, Jan. 24–27 | (Estonia) Kaldvee / Lill | (Norway) Rønning / Brænden | CA$24,000 | CA$10,000 | Super Series | 5.0000 |
| 26 | GOLDLINE Mixed Doubles Sorel-Tracy; Sorel-Tracy, Quebec, Jan. 24–26 | (Quebec) Sanscartier / Caron | (Quebec) Bouchard / Charest | CA$4,000 | CA$1,500 | Circuit Goldline | 1.5000 |
| 27 | Karlstad Mixed Doubles; Karlstad, Sweden, Jan. 31 – Feb. 2 | (Sweden) Wranå / Wranå | (Norway) Rønning / Brænden | kr 6,500 | kr 2,000 | — | 5.0000 |
| 29 | Stadler European Mixed Doubles Invitational; Bern, Switzerland, Feb. 10–12 | (Australia) Gill / Hewitt | (Switzerland) Schwaller / Schwaller | CHF 5,600 | | — | 5.0000 |
| 29 | WCT Tallinn Masters Mixed Doubles; Tallinn, Estonia, Feb. 13–16 | (Norway) Skaslien / Nedregotten | (Estonia) Kaldvee / Lill | €3,400 | €1,200 | World Curling | 4.0000 |
| 29 | GOLDLINE Mixed Doubles Royal Montreal; Montreal, Quebec, Feb. 14–16 | (Quebec) Tremblay / Lanoue | (Quebec) Bouchard / Charest | CA$4,000 | CA$1,500 | Circuit Goldline | 2.0000 |
| 31 | Hvidovre Mixed Doubles Cup; Hvidovre, Denmark, Feb. 28 – Mar. 2 | (Australia) Gill / Hewitt | (Denmark) Holtermann / Holtermann | €3,700 | €1,000 | World Curling | 1.5000 |
| 31 | GOLDLINE Tour Finals; Chicoutimi, Quebec, Feb. 28 – Mar. 2 | (Quebec) Gionest / Desjardins | (Quebec) Laplante / Gibeau | CA$3,600 | CA$1,200 | Circuit Goldline | 1.5000 |
| 34 | WCT Łódź Mixed Doubles Masters; Łódź, Poland, Mar. 20–23 | (Estonia) Kaldvee / Lill | (Germany) Tiuliakova / Totzek | €4,000 | €1,200 | World Curling | 2.5000 |
| 36 | Mixed Doubles Players' Championship; Brantford, Ontario Apr. 3–6 | (Estonia) Kaldvee / Lill | (Norway) Skaslien / Nedregotten | CA$20,000 | CA$6,000 | Super Series | 5.0000 |
| 36 | Mixed Doubles Prague Trophy; Prague, Czech Republic Apr. 4–6 | (Germany) Schöll / Sutor | (Czech Republic) Cihlářová / Macek | €3,400 | €1,200 | World Curling | 1.0000 |
| 36 | WCT Belgium Mixed Doubles Cup; Zemst, Belgium, Apr. 3–6 | (Netherlands) Tonoli / Hoekman | (Hungary) Kalocsai-van Dorp / Kalocsay | €3,500 | €1,000 | World Curling | 0.5000 |
| 36 | WCT Latvian Mixed Doubles Curling Cup 2 Riga, Latvia, Apr. 3–6 | (Czech Republic) Paulová / Paul | (Latvia) Gaidule / Buncis | €1,000 | €340 | World Curling | 0.5000 |

== World Curling team rankings ==
Men

Final Standings
| # | Skip | YTD | OOM |
|---|---|---|---|
| 1 | (Scotland) Bruce Mouat | 532.3 | 532.3 |
| 2 | (Switzerland) Yannick Schwaller | 388.3 | 388.3 |
| 3 | (Alberta) Brad Jacobs | 367.8 | 367.8 |
| 4 | (Manitoba) Matt Dunstone | 353.3 | 353.3 |
| 5 | (Scotland) Ross Whyte | 310.0 | 310.0 |
| 6 | (Saskatchewan) Mike McEwen | 292.0 | 292.0 |
| 7 | (Newfoundland and Labrador) Brad Gushue | 274.3 | 274.3 |
| 8 | (Germany) Marc Muskatewitz | 270.8 | 270.8 |
| 9 | (Switzerland) Marco Hösli | 245.8 | 245.8 |
| 10 | (Ontario) John Epping | 238.8 | 238.8 |
| 11 | (Italy) Joël Retornaz | 216.0 | 216.0 |
| 12 | (United States) Korey Dropkin | 215.5 | 215.5 |
| 13 | (Sweden) Niklas Edin | 214.9 | 214.9 |
| 14 | (Norway) Magnus Ramsfjell | 199.8 | 199.8 |
| 15 | (Saskatchewan) Rylan Kleiter | 186.6 | 186.6 |

Women

Final Standings
| # | Skip | YTD | OOM |
|---|---|---|---|
| 1 | (Ontario) Rachel Homan | 510.0 | 510.0 |
| 2 | (Switzerland) Silvana Tirinzoni | 394.3 | 394.3 |
| 3 | (Sweden) Anna Hasselborg | 341.0 | 341.0 |
| 4 | (South Korea) Kim Eun-jung | 313.8 | 313.8 |
| 5 | (Manitoba) Kerri Einarson | 303.8 | 303.8 |
| 6 | (South Korea) Gim Eun-ji | 262.3 | 262.3 |
| 7 | (Japan) Satsuki Fujisawa | 258.6 | 258.6 |
| 8 | (Japan) Sayaka Yoshimura | 256.3 | 256.3 |
| 9 | (Japan) Momoha Tabata | 249.1 | 249.1 |
| 10 | (South Korea) Ha Seung-youn | 244.3 | 244.3 |
| 11 | (Switzerland) Xenia Schwaller | 244.0 | 244.0 |
| 12 | (Sweden) Isabella Wranå | 208.0 | 208.0 |
| 13 | (Alberta) Kayla Skrlik | 200.6 | 200.6 |
| 14 | (China) Wang Rui | 195.4 | 195.4 |
| 15 | (Nova Scotia) Christina Black | 184.0 | 184.0 |

Mixed Doubles

Final Standings
| # | Team | YTD | OOM |
|---|---|---|---|
| 1 | (Estonia) Kaldvee / Lill | 229.8 | 229.8 |
| 2 | (Australia) Gill / Hewitt | 190.5 | 190.5 |
| 3 | (Scotland) Dodds / Mouat | 183.2 | 183.2 |
| 4 | (Norway) Skaslien / Nedregotten | 163.5 | 163.5 |
| 5 | (Alberta) Peterman / Gallant | 160.5 | 160.5 |
| 6 | (Japan) Koana / Aoki | 129.6 | 129.6 |
| 7 | (Manitoba) Lott / Lott | 126.0 | 126.0 |
| 8 | (Alberta) Walker / (Saskatchewan) Muyres | 125.0 | 125.0 |
| 9 | (Japan) Matsumura / Tanida | 121.4 | 121.4 |
| 10 | (United States) Thiesse / Dropkin | 119.6 | 119.6 |
| 11 | (Saskatchewan) Martin / Laycock | 116.4 | 116.4 |
| 12 | (Ontario) Jones / Laing | 116.3 | 116.3 |
| 13 | (Alberta) Homan / Bottcher | 115.1 | 115.1 |
| 14 | (Switzerland) Pätz / Michel | 106.7 | 106.7 |
| 15 | (Ontario) Sandham / Craig | 106.3 | 106.3 |

== Notable team changes ==
=== Retirement Announcements ===
- (Ontario) Glenn Howard: The four-time Canadian and world champion announced his retirement in April 2024, citing a knee injury. The 61-year-old, who also won 14 Grand Slam titles during his career, will now be a coach for the team, skipped by his son, Scott Howard.
- (Manitoba) Jennifer Jones: One of the most decorated Canadian curlers of all time, Jones announced her retirement from competitive women's play days prior to the 2024 Scotties Tournament of Hearts. Her historic career includes six Canadian titles, two world titles, ten Grand Slam titles and Olympic gold in 2014. She continues to play mixed doubles with her husband Brent Laing.
- Kerry Galusha: The 21-time Northwest Territories women's champion, and supporter of curling in Canada's North and indigenous communities, announced her retirement from competitive curling after the 2025 Scotties Tournament of Hearts.
- (United States) John Landsteiner: The Olympic Champion from 2018, Landsteiner, announced his retirement on 16 of July 2025. The long-time lead of John Shuster's team also won the bronze medal at the 2016 World Championship in Switzerland. The six time US Curling Champion competed at the last three Olympics.

=== Career on hiatus from team curling ===
- Skylar Ackerman: The 22-year-old Saskatchewan skip announced she would be taking a break from competitive curling to pursue further education in the healthcare field. Ackerman made her national women's debut at the 2024 Scotties Tournament of Hearts where she led her team to a 4–4 record.
- (Scotland) Gina Aitken: Announced she would be stepping away from competitive curling after four years with Team Rebecca Morrison. With Morrison, Aitken won bronze at the 2022 European Curling Championships and secured two Scottish Women's Curling Championship titles.
- Shelley Barker: Announced she would step away from competitive curling after playing lead on Team Christina Black since the 2020–21 season. While playing for Black, Barker won two Nova Scotia Scotties Tournament of Hearts titles and went on to place fifth and fourth at the 2022 and 2023 Scotties Tournament of Hearts respectively.
- Clancy Grandy: The two-time reigning BC champion skip announced she was stepping away to focus on other opportunities. Grandy and her team represented British Columbia at consecutive national championships during their two-year run together, finishing sixth in 2023.
- Becca Hamilton: After playing over a decade in the women's game, Hamilton parted ways with the Tabitha Peterson rink to focus on mixed doubles for the 2024–25 season with her brother Matt. While playing under Nina Roth and subsequently Peterson, Hamilton won five United States Women's Curling Championship titles, two United States Olympic Team Trials and bronze at the 2021 World Women's Curling Championship.
- (Manitoba) Briane Harris: The four-time Canadian champion was deemed ineligible to compete at the 2024 Scotties Tournament of Hearts after testing positive for ligandrol, a banned substance. She was later provisionally suspended for up to four years. While she appeals the decision to the Court of Arbitration for Sport, she will not compete with Team Kerri Einarson. Alternate Krysten Karwacki, who played in her position at the Scotties, will take her place on the team for the 2024–25 season.
- (Switzerland) Michèle Jäggi: After not finding a fourth player for the 2023–24 season, Jäggi announced she would step back from competitive curling. The Swiss player won gold at the 2018 World Mixed Doubles Curling Championship with partner Sven Michel.
- (Ontario) David Mathers: After playing for the Howard's for nearly a decade, Mathers decided to step back from competitive curling. He will still compete in mixed doubles with his wife Lynn Kreviazuk.
- Karsten Sturmay: The Alberta skip, who competed in the 2023 Tim Hortons Brier, announced he, along with lead Kurtis Goller were moving on from competitive curling. Sturmay is a former Alberta Golden Bear and represented Canada at the 2019 Winter Universiade in Russia, finishing second.
- (Manitoba) Meghan Walter: Former third for Kate Cameron, Walter announced she would be stepping back to focus on her studies. In their first year together, the Cameron rink took home bronze at the 2024 Scotties Tournament of Hearts.

=== Team line-up changes pre-season ===
Teams listed by skip, new teammates listed in bold

- (Quebec) Félix Asselin: Following the departure of Émile Asselin, 2006 Canadian champion **Jean-Michel Ménard** returned to competitive curling to play third on the team. Martin Crête moved to second while Jean-François Trépanier stayed at lead.
- (Nova Scotia) Christina Black: After Shelley Barker stepped away from competitive play, both **Jill Brothers** and **Marlee Powers** were added with the team now consisting of five players. The revised lineup saw Black continue to skip with Brothers at third, Jenn Baxter at second, Karlee Everist at lead and Powers as the alternate.
- (British Columbia) Corryn Brown: After Jennifer Armstrong stepped away from the four-person game to focus on mixed doubles, the team added Yukon native **Sarah Koltun**, who previously played second on Team Kerry Galusha.
- (Manitoba) Kate Cameron: Following the departure of Meghan Walter, the team added Brianna Cullen to the team at second. Previously playing for the University of Alberta's Serena Gray-Withers rink, Cullen won two U Sports curling championships and reached the semifinal of the 2024 Alberta Scotties Tournament of Hearts. Cullen's addition at second moved Taylor McDonald to third.
- Jolene Campbell: After parting ways with Sara Oliver, the team added Dayna Demmans as their new lead. With the addition of Demmans, the team will now compete out of Saskatchewan after previously playing out of Manitoba.
- (Manitoba) Chelsea Carey: With the retirement of Jennifer Jones, the remaining three Karlee Burgess, Emily Zacharias and Lauren Lenentine added **Chelsea Carey** as their new skip for the 2024–25 season. A two-time Canadian champion, Carey joins the team after sparing for the majority of the 2023–24 season on Team Michèle Jäggi.
- (Manitoba) Reid Carruthers: Following the departure of Brad Jacobs, the team added **Catlin Schneider** as their new third. A Saskatchewan native, Schneider previously played for the likes of John Morris, Matt Dunstone and Colton Flasch.
- John Epping: After his former team of Mat Camm, Pat Janssen and Jason Camm dissolved, Epping formed a new team with **Jacob Horgan**, **Tanner Horgan** and **Ian McMillan** for the 2024–25 season. The Horgan brothers finished sixth at the 2023 Tim Hortons Brier representing Northern Ontario and won a plethora of junior medals while McMillan played in Manitoba for most of his career before joining Team Horgan in 2023.
- (Ontario) Mike Fournier: After his former team of Kevin Flewwelling, Sean Harrison and Zander Elmes disbanded, Fournier formed a new team with **Charlie Richard**, **Punit Sthankia** and **Émile Asselin**. In 2023, Asselin represented Canada at the 2023 World Mixed Curling Championship where the team won a bronze medal.
- (Ontario) Scott Howard: With his father Glenn Howard retiring, Scott Howard stepped up as skip of the team and rejigged the lineup, adding **Mat** and **Jason Camm** at third and second while Tim March remains at lead. The Camm brothers previously played for the John Epping rink.
- (Alberta) Brad Jacobs: After dropping their former skip Brendan Bottcher, the remaining three Marc Kennedy, Brett Gallant and Ben Hebert added **Brad Jacobs** as their new skip for the 2024–25 season. Jacobs, the 2014 Olympic and 2013 Canadian champion, left the Reid Carruthers rink before making the move west.
- (British Columbia) Kayla MacMillan: After their former skip Clancy Grandy took a hiatus, the team added former BC junior champion **Sarah Daniels** as their new third. Kayla MacMillan moved into the skip position.
- (Saskatchewan) Nancy Martin: After her former team of Lindsay Bertsch, Madison Kleiter and Krysten Karwacki disbanded, Martin formed a new team with **Chaelynn Kitz**, **Kadriana Lott** and **Deanna Doig**. Lott, who has a strong mixed doubles background with husband Colton, is the import player from Manitoba.
- (United States) Tabitha Peterson: After parting ways with Becca Hamilton, the team added **Vicky Persinger** and **Taylor Anderson** to the front-end. Persinger previously played for the team at the 2024 World Women's Curling Championship while Anderson will play without her twin Sarah for the first time.
- Sylvie Quillian: After disbanding her former team of Sarah Mallais, Carol Webb and Jane Boyle, Quillian formed a new team with **Jennifer Armstrong**, **Erin Carmody** and **Katie Vandenborre**. While playing under the Andrea Kelly rink, both Quillian and Vandenborre won a bronze medal at the 2022 Scotties Tournament of Hearts. Armstrong returned to New Brunswick for the first time since 2020 while Carmody, a former Scotties silver medallist, will play out of the province for the first time.
- Thomas Scoffin: After leaving Team Aaron Sluchinski to step back from competitive curling, **Kerr Drummond** joined the Thomas Scoffin rink out of Yukon, replacing previous lead Evan Latos.
- Robyn Silvernagle: After playing in Saskatchewan her entire career, Silvernagle joined the Alberta trio of **Jessie Hunkin**, **Jessie Haughian** and **Kristie Moore** as their out-of-province player. Hunkin previously skipped her own Alberta team for two seasons with Haughian playing third.
- (Alberta) Kayla Skrlik: After three years, Team Skrlik parted ways with third Brittany Tran. She was replaced by four-time Scotties participant **Margot Flemming**, the previous third for Team Kerry Galusha.
- (Alberta) Aaron Sluchinski: Following the departure of Kerr Drummond, the team added **Kyle Doering** who played for the now disbanded Karsten Sturmay rink. Having played in back-to-back Briers in 2022 and 2023, Doering was added to the Brad Gushue rink as their alternate for the 2024 World Men's Curling Championship where the team took home the silver medal.
- (United States) Delaney Strouse: After parting ways with Rebecca Rodgers and Susan Dudt, **Sarah Anderson** was added to the team at third. The two-time U.S. champion will play without her twin Taylor for the first time. Anne O'Hara moves from third to lead.
- (Quebec) Laurie St-Georges: After parting ways with Kelly Middaugh, the team added **Lisa Weagle** who returned to competitive women's play for the first time since the 2021–22 season. Weagle, who spent nearly a decade as lead for Rachel Homan, is a two-time Olympian, three-time Scotties champion and ten-time Grand Slam champion.
- (Saskatchewan) Ashley Thevenot: With their former skip Skylar Ackerman taking a break from competitive curling, the team added three-time Scotties participant **Brittany Tran** following her departure from Team Kayla Skrlik. Tran slotted into the team at third while previous third Ashley Thevenot moved up to skip.
- Evan van Amsterdam: Out of Alberta, van Amsterdam formed a new team with **Jason Ginter**, **Sterling Middleton** and **Parker Konschuh**. Ginter and Middleton both previous played for the Catlin Schneider rink out of the BC which disbanded. The team also announced **Darren Moulding** would be their coach and play as alternate in certain events.

=== Team line-up changes during season ===
Teams listed by skip, new teammates listed in bold

- (Alberta) Kevin Koe: On September 24, the Kevin Koe rink announced they would be parting ways with second Jacques Gauthier. On October 8, he was replaced by **Aaron Sluchinski**.
- (Alberta) Aaron Sluchinski: On October 8, Aaron Sluchinski announced he would be parting ways with his team of Jeremy Harty, Kyle Doering and Dylan Webster, citing other opportunities. Sluchinski later joined Team Kevin Koe that same day.
- (Newfoundland and Labrador) Brad Gushue: On October 10, the Brad Gushue rink announced they were parting ways with second E. J. Harnden. Harnden previously helped the team win the 2023 and 2024 Canadian championships. On October 15, it was announced that **Brendan Bottcher** would be joining Brad Gushue's rink as his second following the departure of E. J. Harnden, Bottcher would also be stepping back from his coaching duties of Team Homan.
- (Manitoba) Matt Dunstone: On December 5, the Matt Dunstone rink announced they were parting ways with mate B. J. Neufeld. In their two and a half years together as a team, they found success winning multiple World Curling Tour Championships, and were 2023 Canadian silver medalists. It was announced on December 8 that the Matt Dunstone team would be joined by **E. J. Harnden**, who will be playing second, with Ryan Harnden, E. J.’s brother, playing lead, and Colton Lott will move from second to third.
- (Manitoba) Chelsea Carey: On January 2, the Chelsea Carey rink announced that mate Karlee Burgess will be leaving the team to purse other opportunities, and that they will make announcements on the team's plans in the near future.
- (Manitoba) Kerri Einarson: On January 3, it was announced that Shannon Birchard will miss the remainder of the season due to a knee injury, and will be replaced by **Karlee Burgess**.
- (Manitoba) Kate Cameron: On March 17, the Kate Cameron rink announced they were parting with Brianna Cullen. On March 24, Cameron announced that **Briane Harris** will depart the Kerri Einarson rink to play with Cameron as third, with Taylor McDonald returning to playing second.

== Notes ==
| Preceded by 2023–24 | 2024–25 curling season May 2024 – May 2025 | Succeeded by 2025–26 |
