= 2025 PEI Women's Curling Championship =

- Host city: Bloomfield, Prince Edward Island
- Arena: West Prince Curling Club
- Dates: January 23–25
- Winner: Team DiCarlo
- Curling club: Crapaud Community CC, Crapaud
- Skip: Jane DiCarlo
- Fourth: Veronica Mayne
- Second: Sabrina Smith
- Lead: Whitney Jenkins
- Coach: Kathy O'Rourke

The 2025 PEI Women's Curling Championship, the women's provincial curling championship for Prince Edward Island, was held from January 23 to 25 at the West Prince Curling Club in Bloomfield, Prince Edward Island. The winning Jane DiCarlo rink represented Prince Edward Island at the 2025 Scotties Tournament of Hearts in Thunder Bay, Ontario. The event was held in conjunction with the 2025 PEI Men's Curling Championship, the provincial men's championship.

== Teams ==
The teams are listed as follows:

| Skip | Third | Second | Lead | Alternate | Coach | Club |
|---|---|---|---|---|---|---|
| Sophie Blades | Ella Lenentine | Makiya Noonan | Reid Hart | | Robbie Lenentine | Cornwall CC, Cornwall; Summerside CC, Summerside; West Prince CC, Bloomfield |
| Veronica Mayne (Fourth) | Jane DiCarlo (Skip) | Sabrina Smith | Whitney Jenkins | | Kathy O'Rourke | Crapaud Community CC, Crapaud |
| Rachel MacLean | Sarah Doak | Clara Jack | Jenine Bodner | | | Cornwall CC, Cornwall |
| Hillary Selkirk | Abby Burgess | Anita Sherren | Jenny White | Lauren MacFadyen | | Summerside CC, Summerside |

== Knockout Brackets ==
=== A Event ===
First Knockout
Jane DiCarlo | 9
Hillary Selkirk | 3
Sophie Blades | 9
Rachel MacLean | 13

A Qualifier
Jane DiCarlo | 8
Rachel MacLean | 0

=== B Event ===
Second Knockout
Sophie Blades | 8
Jane DiCarlo | 9
Hillary Selkirk | 9
Rachel MacLean | 6

B Qualifier
Jane DiCarlo | 6
Hillary Selkirk | 4

=== C Event ===
Third Knockout
Rachel MacLean | 3
Jane DiCarlo | 7
Sophie Blades | 6
Hillary Selkirk | 8

C Qualifier
Jane DiCarlo | 8
Hillary Selkirk | 7

== Knockout Results ==
All draw times are listed in Atlantic Time (UTC−04:00).

=== Draw 2 ===
Thursday, January 23, 2:00 pm

| Sheet 1 | 1 | 2 | 3 | 4 | 5 | 6 | 7 | 8 | 9 | 10 | Final |
|---|---|---|---|---|---|---|---|---|---|---|---|
| Jane DiCarlo | 1 | 0 | 5 | 1 | 1 | 0 | 1 | 0 | X | X | 9 |
| Hillary Selkirk | 0 | 1 | 0 | 0 | 0 | 1 | 0 | 1 | X | X | 3 |

| Sheet 2 | 1 | 2 | 3 | 4 | 5 | 6 | 7 | 8 | 9 | 10 | Final |
|---|---|---|---|---|---|---|---|---|---|---|---|
| Sophie Blades | 0 | 2 | 2 | 0 | 1 | 0 | 0 | 2 | 2 | 0 | 9 |
| Rachel MacLean | 2 | 0 | 0 | 1 | 0 | 1 | 5 | 0 | 0 | 4 | 13 |

=== Draw 3 ===
Thursday, January 23, 7:00 pm

| Sheet 4 | 1 | 2 | 3 | 4 | 5 | 6 | 7 | 8 | 9 | 10 | Final |
|---|---|---|---|---|---|---|---|---|---|---|---|
| Jane DiCarlo | 1 | 0 | 1 | 2 | 3 | 1 | X | X | X | X | 8 |
| Rachel MacLean | 0 | 0 | 0 | 0 | 0 | 0 | X | X | X | X | 0 |

=== Draw 4 ===
Friday, January 24, 9:00 am

| Sheet 1 | 1 | 2 | 3 | 4 | 5 | 6 | 7 | 8 | 9 | 10 | 11 | Final |
|---|---|---|---|---|---|---|---|---|---|---|---|---|
| Sophie Blades | 1 | 0 | 1 | 0 | 2 | 0 | 3 | 0 | 0 | 1 | 0 | 8 |
| Jane DiCarlo | 0 | 1 | 0 | 3 | 0 | 1 | 0 | 2 | 1 | 0 | 1 | 9 |

| Sheet 2 | 1 | 2 | 3 | 4 | 5 | 6 | 7 | 8 | 9 | 10 | Final |
|---|---|---|---|---|---|---|---|---|---|---|---|
| Hillary Selkirk | 0 | 0 | 1 | 2 | 0 | 0 | 1 | 0 | 4 | 1 | 9 |
| Rachel MacLean | 2 | 0 | 0 | 0 | 2 | 1 | 0 | 1 | 0 | 0 | 6 |

=== Draw 5 ===
Friday, January 24, 2:00 pm

| Sheet 3 | 1 | 2 | 3 | 4 | 5 | 6 | 7 | 8 | 9 | 10 | Final |
|---|---|---|---|---|---|---|---|---|---|---|---|
| Jane DiCarlo | 0 | 1 | 0 | 0 | 2 | 1 | 1 | 1 | 0 | X | 6 |
| Hillary Selkirk | 1 | 0 | 1 | 1 | 0 | 0 | 0 | 0 | 1 | X | 4 |

=== Draw 8 ===
Saturday, January 25, 2:00 pm

| Sheet 2 | 1 | 2 | 3 | 4 | 5 | 6 | 7 | 8 | 9 | 10 | Final |
|---|---|---|---|---|---|---|---|---|---|---|---|
| Rachel MacLean | 1 | 0 | 0 | 0 | 1 | 0 | 1 | 0 | 0 | X | 3 |
| Jane DiCarlo | 0 | 0 | 1 | 1 | 0 | 2 | 0 | 2 | 1 | X | 7 |

| Sheet 4 | 1 | 2 | 3 | 4 | 5 | 6 | 7 | 8 | 9 | 10 | 11 | Final |
|---|---|---|---|---|---|---|---|---|---|---|---|---|
| Sophie Blades | 0 | 0 | 1 | 0 | 0 | 1 | 1 | 0 | 2 | 1 | 0 | 6 |
| Hillary Selkirk | 1 | 0 | 0 | 3 | 1 | 0 | 0 | 1 | 0 | 0 | 2 | 8 |

=== Draw 9 ===
Saturday, January 25, 7:00 pm

| Sheet 3 | 1 | 2 | 3 | 4 | 5 | 6 | 7 | 8 | 9 | 10 | Final |
|---|---|---|---|---|---|---|---|---|---|---|---|
| Jane DiCarlo | 0 | 0 | 0 | 1 | 0 | 2 | 0 | 2 | 1 | 2 | 8 |
| Hillary Selkirk | 2 | 0 | 4 | 0 | 1 | 0 | 0 | 0 | 0 | 0 | 7 |

== Playoffs ==
- No playoffs were required as the Jane DiCarlo rink won all three qualifying events.

2025 PEI Women's Curling Championship

Jane DiCarlo
2nd Prince Edward Island Provincial Championship title
