= 2025 PEI Men's Curling Championship =

- Host city: Bloomfield, Prince Edward Island
- Arena: West Prince Curling Club
- Dates: January 23–25
- Winner: Team Smith
- Curling club: Crapaud Community CC, Crapaud
- Skip: Tyler Smith
- Third: Adam Cocks
- Second: Christopher Gallant
- Lead: Ed White

The 2025 PEI Men's Curling Championship, the men's provincial curling championship for Prince Edward Island, was held from January 23 to 25 at the West Prince Curling Club in Bloomfield, Prince Edward Island. The winning Tyler Smith rink will represent Prince Edward Island at the 2025 Montana's Brier in Kelowna, British Columbia. The event was held in conjunction with the 2025 PEI Women's Curling Championship.

== Teams ==
The teams are listed as follows:

Skip	Third	Second	Lead	Alternate	Coach	Club
Nick Blanchard	Chase MacMillan	Jamie Stride	Andrew Low			Crapaud Community CC, Crapaud
Isaiah Dalton	Conner Bruce	Sheamus Herlihy	Nate MacRae		Dennis Watts	Cornwall CC, Cornwall
Tyler Harris	Tyler MacKenzie	Daniel MacFadyen	Nathan Hardy			Crapaud Community CC, Crapaud
Tim Hockin (Fourth)	Darren Higgins (Skip)	Mike Spencer	Jonathan Greenan			Summerside CC, Summerside
Blair Jay	Corey Montgomery	Mitchell Rowley	Kent MacKay			Summerside CC, Summerside
Jack MacFadyen	Keegan Warnell	Luke Butler	Anderson MacDougall		David MacFadyen	Cornwall CC, Cornwall; Summerside CC, Summerside
Tyler Smith	Adam Cocks	Christopher Gallant	Ed White			Crapaud Community CC, Crapaud
Steve vanOuwerkerk	Sam Ramsay	Nick vanOuwerkerk	Corey Miller	Patrick Ramsay		Crapaud Community CC, Crapaud
Dennis Watts	Erik Brodersen	Shane MacDonald	Andrew MacDougall			Cornwall CC, Cornwall

== Knockout Brackets ==
=== A Event ===
First Knockout	A Qualifier
Darren Higgins	9
Jack MacFadyen	2
Darren Higgins	3
Steve vanOuwerkerk	7
Steve vanOuwerkerk	7
Nick Blanchard	3
Steve vanOuwerkerk	0
Tyler Smith	12
Tyler Smith	10
Blair Jay	5	Blair Jay	8
Tyler Harris	4	Tyler Smith	9
Dennis Watts	5
Dennis Watts	11
Isaiah Dalton	5

=== B Event ===
Second Knockout	B Qualifier
Steve vanOuwerkerk	1
Dennis Watts	12	Dennis Watts	8
Nick Blanchard	9	Nick Blanchard	2	Dennis Watts	1
Tyler Harris	6	Jack MacFadyen	1	Tyler Smith	10
Jack MacFadyen	8	Tyler Smith	9
Darren Higgins	9	Darren Higgins	2
Blair Jay	6	Isaiah Dalton	2
Isaiah Dalton	11

=== C Event ===
Third Knockout	C Qualifier
Tyler Smith	5
Steve vanOuwerkerk	9	Steve vanOuwerkerk	3
Jack MacFadyen	5	Jack MacFadyen	4	Tyler Smith	8
Isaiah Dalton	0	Darren Higgins	6
Dennis Watts	2
Darren Higgins	9	Darren Higgins	11
Nick Blanchard	5	Tyler Harris	2
Tyler Harris	8	Tyler Harris	11
Blair Jay	1

== Knockout Results ==
All draw times are listed in Atlantic Time (UTC−04:00).

=== Draw 1 ===
Thursday, January 23, 9:00 am

Sheet 1	1	2	3	4	5	6	7	8	9	10	Final
Blair Jay 🔨	0	0	1	0	1	1	0	0	2	0	5
Tyler Harris	1	0	0	1	0	0	0	1	0	1	4

Sheet 2	1	2	3	4	5	6	7	8	9	10	Final
Darren Higgins	0	0	2	1	3	0	2	1	X	X	9
Jack MacFadyen 🔨	1	0	0	0	0	1	0	0	X	X	2

Sheet 3	1	2	3	4	5	6	7	8	9	10	Final
Steve vanOuwerkerk 🔨	0	0	0	1	2	0	0	3	1	X	7
Nick Blanchard	0	1	1	0	0	1	0	0	0	X	3

Sheet 4	1	2	3	4	5	6	7	8	9	10	Final
Dennis Watts	0	4	0	2	0	2	3	0	X	X	11
Isaiah Dalton 🔨	2	0	1	0	1	0	0	1	X	X	5

=== Draw 2 ===
Thursday, January 23, 2:00 pm

Sheet 3	1	2	3	4	5	6	7	8	9	10	Final
Tyler Harris	0	0	0	1	1	3	0	0	1	0	6
Jack MacFadyen 🔨	0	2	2	0	0	0	2	0	0	2	8

Sheet 4	1	2	3	4	5	6	7	8	9	10	Final
Tyler Smith	2	0	1	0	3	0	3	0	0	1	10
Blair Jay 🔨	0	2	0	1	0	1	0	3	1	0	8

=== Draw 3 ===
Thursday, January 23, 7:00 pm

Sheet 1	1	2	3	4	5	6	7	8	9	10	Final
Darren Higgins	1	0	0	2	0	0	0	0	0	X	3
Steve vanOuwerkerk 🔨	0	0	1	0	1	2	1	1	1	X	7

Sheet 2	1	2	3	4	5	6	7	8	9	10	Final
Nick Blanchard 🔨	2	0	2	2	1	2	X	X	X	X	9
Jack MacFadyen	0	1	0	0	0	0	X	X	X	X	1

Sheet 3	1	2	3	4	5	6	7	8	9	10	Final
Tyler Smith 🔨	0	0	4	0	2	0	2	0	1	X	9
Dennis Watts	0	0	0	2	0	1	0	2	0	X	5

=== Draw 4 ===
Friday, January 24, 9:00 am

Sheet 3	1	2	3	4	5	6	7	8	9	10	Final
Blair Jay 🔨	0	1	0	1	2	0	1	1	0	X	6
Isaiah Dalton	2	0	4	0	0	1	0	0	4	X	11

Sheet 4	1	2	3	4	5	6	7	8	9	10	Final
Dennis Watts 🔨	3	0	2	5	2	X	X	X	X	X	12
Nick Blanchard	0	2	0	0	0	X	X	X	X	X	2

=== Draw 5 ===
Friday, January 24, 2:00 pm

Sheet 1	1	2	3	4	5	6	7	8	9	10	Final
Tyler Harris 🔨	2	2	1	3	0	X	X	X	X	X	8
Blair Jay	0	0	0	0	1	X	X	X	X	X	1

Sheet 2	1	2	3	4	5	6	7	8	9	10	Final
Steve vanOuwerkerk	0	0	0	0	X	X	X	X	X	X	0
Tyler Smith 🔨	4	3	1	4	X	X	X	X	X	X	12

Sheet 4	1	2	3	4	5	6	7	8	9	10	Final
Darren Higgins 🔨	0	2	0	1	3	1	0	2	X	X	9
Isaiah Dalton	0	0	1	0	0	0	1	0	X	X	2

=== Draw 6 ===
Thursday, January 24, 7:00 pm

Sheet 1	1	2	3	4	5	6	7	8	9	10	Final
Jack MacFadyen	0	0	1	1	1	1	1	X	X	X	5
Isaiah Dalton 🔨	0	0	0	0	0	0	0	X	X	X	0

Sheet 2	1	2	3	4	5	6	7	8	9	10	Final
Nick Blanchard 🔨	1	1	0	2	0	0	0	1	0	X	5
Tyler Harris	0	0	1	0	2	4	0	0	4	X	11

Sheet 3	1	2	3	4	5	6	7	8	9	10	Final
Tyler Smith 🔨	3	0	2	1	0	3	X	X	X	X	9
Darren Higgins	0	1	0	0	1	0	X	X	X	X	2

Sheet 4	1	2	3	4	5	6	7	8	9	10	Final
Steve vanOuwerkerk 🔨	0	0	0	0	0	1	0	X	X	X	1
Dennis Watts	0	0	0	2	3	0	3	X	X	X	8

=== Draw 7 ===
Saturday, January 25, 9:00 am

Sheet 1	1	2	3	4	5	6	7	8	9	10	Final
Darren Higgins 🔨	1	0	0	0	2	2	1	3	X	X	9
Tyler Harris	0	0	1	1	0	0	0	0	X	X	2

Sheet 2	1	2	3	4	5	6	7	8	9	10	Final
Dennis Watts	1	0	0	0	0	X	X	X	X	X	1
Tyler Smith 🔨	0	3	1	2	4	X	X	X	X	X	10

Sheet 3	1	2	3	4	5	6	7	8	9	10	Final
Steve vanOuwerkerk	1	0	2	0	2	0	1	1	2	X	9
Jack MacFadyen 🔨	0	1	0	2	0	1	0	0	0	X	4

=== Draw 8 ===
Saturday, January 25, 2:00 pm

Sheet 1	1	2	3	4	5	6	7	8	9	10	Final
Tyler Smith 🔨	0	1	1	0	1	1	0	0	0	1	5
Steve vanOuwerkerk	0	0	0	2	0	0	0	1	0	0	3

Sheet 3	1	2	3	4	5	6	7	8	9	10	Final
Dennis Watts	0	0	0	2	0	0	0	X	X	X	2
Darren Higgins 🔨	2	2	1	0	1	1	4	X	X	X	11

=== Draw 9 ===
Saturday, January 25, 7:00 pm

Sheet 3	1	2	3	4	5	6	7	8	9	10	Final
Tyler Smith	0	0	4	2	1	0	0	0	0	1	8
Darren Higgins 🔨	3	0	0	0	0	2	0	0	1	0	6

== Playoffs ==
No playoff was needed as Team Smith won all three events.

2025 PEI Men's Curling Championship

Tyler Smith
3rd Prince Edward Island Provincial Championship title
