= 2024 Gothenburg Mixed Doubles Cup =

- Host city: Gothenburg, Sweden
- Arena: Gothenburg Curling Hall
- Dates: December 28–30
- Winner: (Scotland) Dodds / Mouat
- Female: Jennifer Dodds
- Male: Bruce Mouat
- Finalist: (Estonia) Kaldvee / Lill

The 2024 Gothenburg Mixed Doubles Cup was held from December 28 to 30 at the Gothenburg Curling Hall in Gothenburg, Sweden. The event was held in a round robin format with a purse of SEK 75,000.

== Teams ==
The teams are listed as follows:

Female	Male	Locale
Emira Abbes	Klaudius Harsch	Füssen, Germany
Jennifer Dodds	Bruce Mouat	Stirling, Scotland
Laura Engler	Kevin Wunderlin	Zug, Switzerland
Anna Hasselborg	Oskar Eriksson	Sundbyberg & Karlstad, Sweden
Fay Henderson	Grant Hardie	Stirling, Scotland
Jasmin Holtermann	Henrik Holtermann	Hvidovre, Denmark
Carole Howald	Pablo Lachat	Lausanne, Switzerland
Sophie Jackson	Duncan McFadzean	Stirling, Scotland
Marie Kaldvee	Harri Lill	Tallinn, Estonia
Rebecca Morrison	Bobby Lammie	Stirling, Scotland
Oihane Otaegi	Mikel Unanue	San Sebastián, Spain
Alina Pätz	Sven Michel	Zurich, Switzerland
Jenny Perret	Martin Rios	Glarus, Switzerland
Martine Rønning	Mathias Brænden	Lillehammer, Norway
Kristin Skaslien	Magnus Nedregotten	Oslo, Norway
Vanessa Tonoli	Wouter Gösgens	Zoetermeer, Netherlands
Adela Walczak	Andrzej Augustyniak	Łódź, Poland
Therese Westman	Robin Ahlberg	Sundbyberg, Sweden
Isabella Wranå	Rasmus Wranå	Sundbyberg & Karlstad, Sweden
Julie Zelingrová	Vít Chabičovský	Prague, Czech Republic

== Round robin standings ==
Final Round Robin Standings

Key
Teams to Playoffs

Pool A	W	SOW	SOL	L	PTS	PF	PA	SO
(Estonia) Kaldvee / Lill	4	0	0	0	12	28	20	18
(Sweden) Hasselborg / Eriksson	3	0	0	1	9	30	24	1
(Scotland) Jackson / McFadzean	2	0	0	2	6	26	26	20
(Switzerland) Howald / Lachat	1	0	0	3	3	26	29	2
(Czech Republic) Zelingrová / Chabičovský	0	0	0	4	0	26	37	7

Pool B	W	SOW	SOL	L	PTS	PF	PA	SO
(Sweden) Wranå / Wranå	3	1	0	0	11	35	18	3
(Switzerland) Perret / Rios	2	0	0	2	6	21	20	13
(Norway) Rønning / Brænden	1	1	0	2	5	24	26	10
(Germany) Abbes / Harsch	1	0	1	2	4	19	29	16
(Scotland) Morrison / Lammie	1	0	1	2	4	19	25	15

Pool C	W	SOW	SOL	L	PTS	PF	PA	SO
(Switzerland) Engler / Wunderlin	4	0	0	0	12	38	17	19
(Switzerland) Pätz / Michel	3	0	0	1	9	27	12	4
(Scotland) Henderson / Hardie	2	0	0	2	6	20	21	8
(Poland) Walczak / Augustyniak	1	0	0	3	3	18	30	6
(Spain) Otaegi / Unanue	0	0	0	4	0	11	34	17

Pool D	W	SOW	SOL	L	PTS	PF	PA	SO
(Scotland) Dodds / Mouat	4	0	0	0	12	33	12	12
(Norway) Skaslien / Nedregotten	2	0	0	2	6	26	23	5
(Denmark) Holtermann / Holtermann	1	1	0	2	5	18	26	14
(Sweden) Westman / Ahlberg	1	0	1	2	4	26	33	9
(Netherlands) Tonoli / Gösgens	1	0	0	3	3	21	30	11

== Round robin results ==
All draw times listed in Central European Time (UTC+01:00).

=== Draw 1 ===
Saturday, December 28, 9:00 am

Sheet 1	1	2	3	4	5	6	7	8	Final
(Sweden) Wranå / Wranå	1	1	0	0	4	0	4	X	10
(Germany) Abbes / Harsch	0	0	1	1	0	2	0	X	4

Sheet 2	1	2	3	4	5	6	7	8	Final
(Scotland) Jackson / McFadzean	0	1	0	0	0	2	1	0	4
(Estonia) Kaldvee / Lill	1	0	1	2	1	0	0	1	6

Sheet 3	1	2	3	4	5	6	7	8	Final
(Czech Republic) Zelingrová / Chabičovský	1	0	0	2	1	0	3	0	7
(Switzerland) Howald / Lachat	0	2	2	0	0	4	0	1	9

Sheet 4	1	2	3	4	5	6	7	8	Final
(Switzerland) Perret / Rios	1	1	1	0	1	1	3	X	8
(Scotland) Morrison / Lammie	0	0	0	2	0	0	0	X	2

=== Draw 2 ===
Saturday, December 28, 11:45 am

Sheet 1	1	2	3	4	5	6	7	8	Final
(Denmark) Holtermann / Holtermann	1	1	2	0	0	2	0	1	7
(Netherlands) Tonoli / Gösgens	0	0	0	1	1	0	2	0	4

Sheet 2	1	2	3	4	5	6	7	8	Final
(Switzerland) Pätz / Michel	0	1	3	0	0	4	X	X	8
(Poland) Walczak / Augustyniak	0	0	0	1	1	0	X	X	2

Sheet 3	1	2	3	4	5	6	7	8	Final
(Spain) Otaegi / Unanue	0	0	2	0	0	0	0	X	2
(Scotland) Henderson / Hardie	1	2	0	1	1	1	2	X	8

Sheet 4	1	2	3	4	5	6	7	8	Final
(Scotland) Dodds / Mouat	3	0	4	1	1	X	X	X	9
(Norway) Skaslien / Nedregotten	0	1	0	0	0	X	X	X	1

=== Draw 3 ===
Saturday, December 28, 2:30 pm

Sheet 1	1	2	3	4	5	6	7	8	Final
(Sweden) Hasselborg / Eriksson	1	1	1	1	0	1	0	1	6
(Scotland) Jackson / McFadzean	0	0	0	0	2	0	1	0	3

Sheet 2	1	2	3	4	5	6	7	8	Final
(Germany) Abbes / Harsch	1	0	0	0	1	0	0	X	2
(Switzerland) Perret / Rios	0	2	1	2	0	2	1	X	8

Sheet 3	1	2	3	4	5	6	7	8	Final
(Scotland) Morrison / Lammie	2	0	1	0	3	0	1	X	7
(Norway) Rønning / Brænden	0	1	0	1	0	1	0	X	3

Sheet 4	1	2	3	4	5	6	7	8	Final
(Estonia) Kaldvee / Lill	0	2	0	4	0	1	1	X	8
(Czech Republic) Zelingrová / Chabičovský	1	0	1	0	2	0	0	X	4

=== Draw 4 ===
Saturday, December 28, 5:15 pm

Sheet 1	1	2	3	4	5	6	7	8	Final
(Switzerland) Engler / Wunderlin	2	0	2	0	0	1	1	1	7
(Switzerland) Pätz / Michel	0	2	0	2	1	0	0	0	5

Sheet 2	1	2	3	4	5	6	7	8	Final
(Netherlands) Tonoli / Gösgens	1	0	0	1	0	1	0	X	3
(Scotland) Dodds / Mouat	0	1	2	0	4	0	1	X	8

Sheet 3	1	2	3	4	5	6	7	8	Final
(Norway) Skaslien / Nedregotten	1	1	1	1	0	3	0	X	7
(Sweden) Westman / Ahlberg	0	0	0	0	4	0	4	X	8

Sheet 4	1	2	3	4	5	6	7	8	Final
(Poland) Walczak / Augustyniak	1	1	0	0	0	3	2	1	8
(Spain) Otaegi / Unanue	0	0	1	2	1	0	0	0	4

=== Draw 5 ===
Saturday, December 28, 8:00 pm

Sheet 1	1	2	3	4	5	6	7	8	Final
(Norway) Rønning / Brænden	0	4	1	0	1	2	X	X	8
(Switzerland) Perret / Rios	1	0	0	2	0	0	X	X	3

Sheet 2	1	2	3	4	5	6	7	8	Final
(Switzerland) Howald / Lachat	0	0	0	3	1	0	1	X	5
(Scotland) Jackson / McFadzean	2	2	1	0	0	3	0	X	8

Sheet 3	1	2	3	4	5	6	7	8	Final
(Estonia) Kaldvee / Lill	0	2	0	2	0	3	0	1	8
(Sweden) Hasselborg / Eriksson	1	0	3	0	2	0	1	0	7

Sheet 4	1	2	3	4	5	6	7	8	9	Final
(Scotland) Morrison / Lammie	2	1	0	0	1	0	2	0	0	6
(Sweden) Wranå / Wranå	0	0	1	2	0	2	0	1	1	7

=== Draw 6 ===
Sunday, December 29, 9:00 am

Sheet 1	1	2	3	4	5	6	7	8	Final
(Scotland) Henderson / Hardie	2	1	1	0	0	1	2	X	7
(Poland) Walczak / Augustyniak	0	0	0	2	1	0	0	X	3

Sheet 2	1	2	3	4	5	6	7	8	Final
(Spain) Otaegi / Unanue	0	0	1	0	2	0	X	X	3
(Switzerland) Engler / Wunderlin	1	2	0	4	0	4	X	X	11

Sheet 3	1	2	3	4	5	6	7	8	Final
(Scotland) Dodds / Mouat	2	2	1	1	0	1	X	X	7
(Denmark) Holtermann / Holtermann	0	0	0	0	2	0	X	X	2

Sheet 4	1	2	3	4	5	6	7	8	Final
(Sweden) Westman / Ahlberg	1	0	1	0	2	0	2	0	6
(Netherlands) Tonoli / Gösgens	0	2	0	3	0	3	0	2	10

=== Draw 7 ===
Sunday, December 29, 11:45 am

Sheet 1	1	2	3	4	5	6	7	8	Final
(Switzerland) Howald / Lachat	1	1	0	3	0	0	0	0	5
(Estonia) Kaldvee / Lill	0	0	2	0	1	1	1	1	6

Sheet 2	1	2	3	4	5	6	7	8	Final
(Czech Republic) Zelingrová / Chabičovský	0	4	0	0	1	0	1	0	6
(Sweden) Hasselborg / Eriksson	2	0	3	1	0	2	0	1	9

Sheet 3	1	2	3	4	5	6	7	8	Final
(Switzerland) Perret / Rios	0	1	0	0	1	0	X	X	2
(Sweden) Wranå / Wranå	2	0	2	2	0	2	X	X	8

Sheet 4	1	2	3	4	5	6	7	8	9	Final
(Norway) Rønning / Brænden	2	1	0	0	0	1	2	0	1	7
(Germany) Abbes / Harsch	0	0	2	1	1	0	0	2	0	6

=== Draw 8 ===
Sunday, December 29, 2:30 pm

Sheet 1	1	2	3	4	5	6	7	8	Final
(Netherlands) Tonoli / Gösgens	0	1	0	2	0	1	0	X	4
(Norway) Skaslien / Nedregotten	3	0	3	0	1	0	2	X	9

Sheet 2	1	2	3	4	5	6	7	8	9	Final
(Denmark) Holtermann / Holtermann	1	2	0	0	1	0	1	1	1	7
(Sweden) Westman / Ahlberg	0	0	1	3	0	2	0	0	0	6

Sheet 3	1	2	3	4	5	6	7	8	Final
(Switzerland) Pätz / Michel	1	1	2	0	0	2	1	X	7
(Spain) Otaegi / Unanue	0	0	0	1	1	0	0	X	2

Sheet 4	1	2	3	4	5	6	7	8	Final
(Switzerland) Engler / Wunderlin	4	0	0	0	1	4	X	X	9
(Scotland) Henderson / Hardie	0	2	1	1	0	0	X	X	4

=== Draw 9 ===
Sunday, December 29, 5:15 pm

Sheet 1	1	2	3	4	5	6	7	8	Final
(Germany) Abbes / Harsch	0	0	1	1	0	1	1	3	7
(Scotland) Morrison / Lammie	1	1	0	0	2	0	0	0	4

Sheet 2	1	2	3	4	5	6	7	8	Final
(Sweden) Wranå / Wranå	0	0	2	0	4	0	4	X	10
(Norway) Rønning / Brænden	2	1	0	1	0	2	0	X	6

Sheet 3	1	2	3	4	5	6	7	8	Final
(Scotland) Jackson / McFadzean	0	0	4	0	1	0	4	2	11
(Czech Republic) Zelingrová / Chabičovský	2	2	0	2	0	3	0	0	9

Sheet 4	1	2	3	4	5	6	7	8	Final
(Sweden) Hasselborg / Eriksson	1	3	0	0	2	0	0	2	8
(Switzerland) Howald / Lachat	0	0	2	1	0	3	1	0	7

=== Draw 10 ===
Sunday, December 29, 8:00 pm

Sheet 1	1	2	3	4	5	6	7	8	Final
(Sweden) Westman / Ahlberg	2	0	2	0	2	0	0	X	6
(Scotland) Dodds / Mouat	0	2	0	1	0	5	1	X	9

Sheet 2	1	2	3	4	5	6	7	8	Final
(Scotland) Henderson / Hardie	0	1	0	0	X	X	X	X	1
(Switzerland) Pätz / Michel	3	0	3	1	X	X	X	X	7

Sheet 3	1	2	3	4	5	6	7	8	Final
(Poland) Walczak / Augustyniak	0	1	0	1	0	3	0	X	5
(Switzerland) Engler / Wunderlin	1	0	1	0	4	0	5	X	11

Sheet 4	1	2	3	4	5	6	7	8	Final
(Norway) Skaslien / Nedregotten	0	4	0	5	X	X	X	X	9
(Denmark) Holtermann / Holtermann	1	0	1	0	X	X	X	X	2

== Playoffs ==
Quarterfinals
1	(Scotland) Dodds / Mouat	7
8	(Switzerland) Perret / Rios	1
4	(Sweden) Wranå / Wranå	4
5	(Sweden) Hasselborg / Eriksson	8
(Pairings are reseeded after the first round)
2	(Estonia) Kaldvee / Lill	6
7	(Norway) Skaslien / Nedregotten	5
3	(Switzerland) Engler / Wunderlin	3
6	(Switzerland) Pätz / Michel	7

Semifinals
1	(Scotland) Dodds / Mouat	6
6	(Switzerland) Pätz / Michel	3
2	(Estonia) Kaldvee / Lill	7
5	(Sweden) Hasselborg / Eriksson	4

Final
1	(Scotland) Dodds / Mouat	8
2	(Estonia) Kaldvee / Lill	4
Third place
6	(Switzerland) Pätz / Michel	7
5	(Sweden) Hasselborg / Eriksson	3

=== Quarterfinals ===
Monday, December 30, 8:00 am

Sheet 1	1	2	3	4	5	6	7	8	Final
(Sweden) Wranå / Wranå	1	1	0	1	0	1	0	0	4
(Sweden) Hasselborg / Eriksson	0	0	2	0	1	0	2	3	8

Sheet 2	1	2	3	4	5	6	7	8	Final
(Estonia) Kaldvee / Lill	1	1	1	0	1	1	0	1	6
(Norway) Skaslien / Nedregotten	0	0	0	3	0	0	2	0	5

Sheet 3	1	2	3	4	5	6	7	8	Final
(Scotland) Dodds / Mouat	4	1	0	1	1	X	X	X	7
(Switzerland) Perret / Rios	0	0	1	0	0	X	X	X	1

Sheet 4	1	2	3	4	5	6	7	8	Final
(Switzerland) Engler / Wunderlin	0	1	0	0	1	1	0	X	3
(Switzerland) Pätz / Michel	1	0	1	2	0	0	3	X	7

=== Semifinals ===
Monday, December 30, 10:30 am

Sheet 1	1	2	3	4	5	6	7	8	Final
(Estonia) Kaldvee / Lill	1	2	0	1	1	2	0	X	7
(Sweden) Hasselborg / Eriksson	0	0	2	0	0	0	2	X	4

Sheet 3	1	2	3	4	5	6	7	8	Final
(Scotland) Dodds / Mouat	1	0	1	0	1	0	2	1	6
(Switzerland) Pätz / Michel	0	1	0	1	0	1	0	0	3

=== Third place game ===
Monday, December 30, 1:00 pm

Sheet 3	1	2	3	4	5	6	7	8	Final
(Switzerland) Pätz / Michel	1	1	2	0	2	0	1	X	7
(Sweden) Hasselborg / Eriksson	0	0	0	2	0	1	0	X	3

=== Final ===
Monday, December 30, 1:00 pm

Sheet 1	1	2	3	4	5	6	7	8	Final
(Scotland) Dodds / Mouat	0	2	1	0	1	0	1	3	8
(Estonia) Kaldvee / Lill	2	0	0	1	0	1	0	0	4
