= Bloomfield, Prince Edward Island =

Village in Prince Edward Island, Canada

Bloomfield
- Village
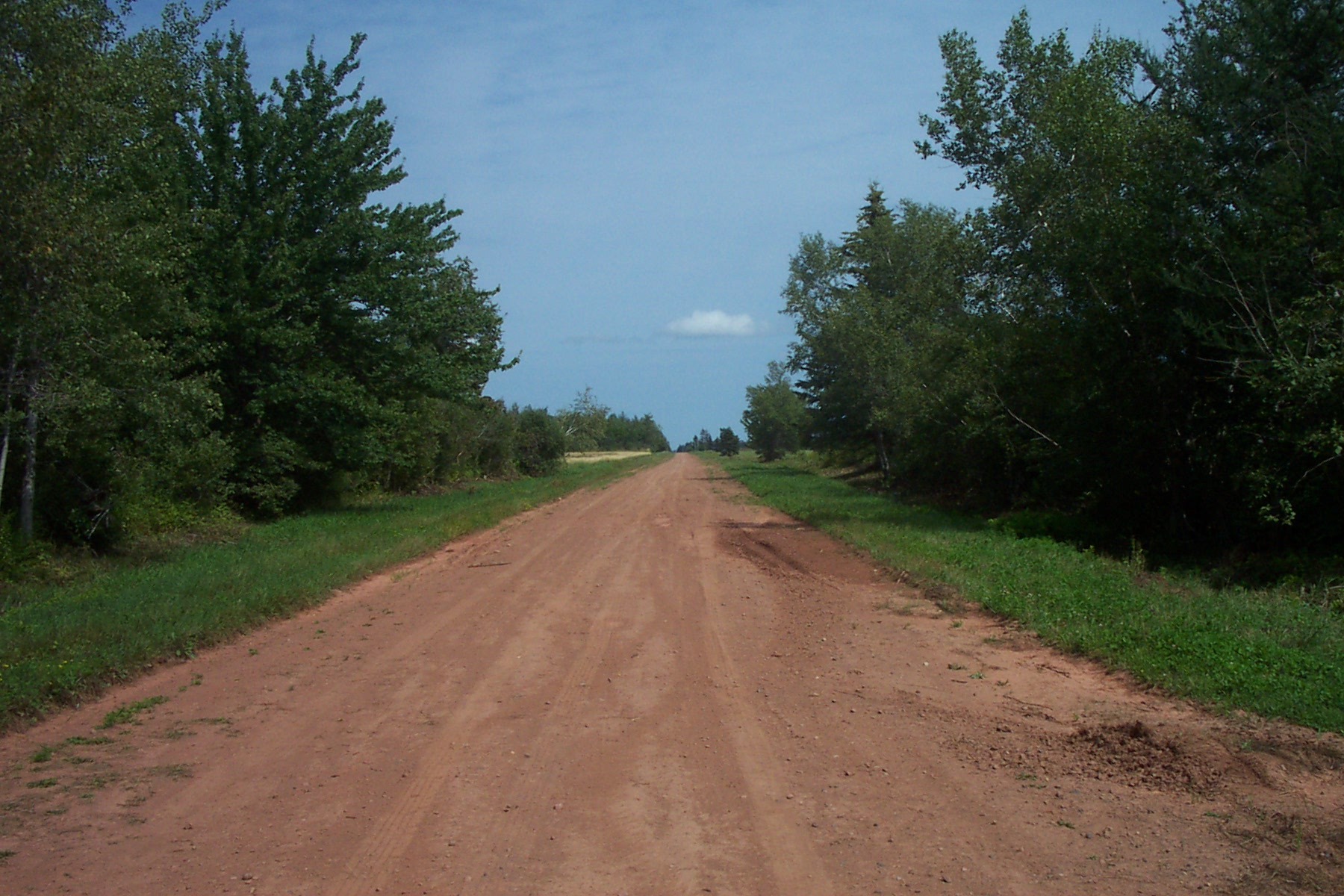

- Location within Prince Edward Island Location within Canada
- Coordinates: 46°46′N 64°14′W
- Country: Canada
- Province: Prince Edward Island
- County: Prince County
- Named: c. 1877
- Named for: Bloomfield, Ontario
- Elevation: 40 m (130 ft)
- Time zone: UTC-04:00 (Atlantic Standard Time)
- Canadian Postal code: C0B 1E0
- Area code: 902

Bloomfield is an unincorporated community in Prince County, Prince Edward Island, Canada. It was named after Bloomfield, Ontario, in approximately 1877.

Bloomfield Provincial Park is located here.

Bloomfield is the birthplace of Mary Josephine Ray.
