= 2026–27 curling season =

- Sport: Curling

Seasons
- ← 2025–26 2027–28 →

The 2026–27 curling season began in May 2026 and ends in May 2027.

== World Curling Federation events ==
=== Championships ===
Event		Gold	Silver	Bronze
European Curling Championships; Ostrava, Czechia, Oct. 27 – Nov. 1	M	Scotland (Hardie)	Italy (Spiller)	Sweden (Eriksson)
European Curling Championships; Ostrava, Czechia, Oct. 27 – Nov. 1	W	Sweden (Wranå)	Switzerland (Pätz)	Latvia (Barone)
World Wheelchair-B Curling Championship; Lohja, Finland, Nov. 23–28				
World Junior-B Curling Championships; Lohja, Finland, Dec. 8–21	M			
World Junior-B Curling Championships; Lohja, Finland, Dec. 8–21	W			
World Mixed Doubles Curling Championship; Lohja, Finland, Jan. 4–10				
World Junior Curling Championships; Aberdeen, Scotland, Feb. 6–14	M			
World Junior Curling Championships; Aberdeen, Scotland, Feb. 6–14	W			
World Wheelchair Curling Championship; Lohja, Finland, Feb. 20–27				
World Wheelchair Mixed Doubles Curling Championship; Lohja, Finland, Mar. 1–8				
World Women's Curling Championship; TBA, Mar. 13–21				
World Men's Curling Championship; Saint John, New Brunswick, Canada, Mar. 27 – Apr. 4				
World Mixed Curling Championship; Penticton, British Columbia, Canada, Apr. 3–10				
World Senior Curling Championships; Kelowna, British Columbia, Canada, Apr. 24 – May 1	M			
World Senior Curling Championships; Kelowna, British Columbia, Canada, Apr. 24 – May 1	W			
World Junior Mixed Doubles Curling Championship; Edmonton, Alberta, Canada, May 3–9				

=== Qualification events ===
Event	Qualifiers
World Mixed Doubles Qualification Event; Lafayette, Colorado, United States, Oct. 2–8	United States; Latvia; France
World Championship Qualifier Men; Aberdeen, Scotland, Nov. 8–13	Netherlands; Norway; Denmark; Philippines; Austria; Australia
World Championship Qualifier Women; Östersund, Sweden, Nov. 21–26	
World Mixed Doubles Qualification Event; Winnipeg, Manitoba, Canada, Apr. 10–17	
World Championship Pre-Qualifier (Women); TBA, May 1–8	
World Championship Pre-Qualifier (Men); Batumi, Georgia, May 8–15	

== Other events ==
Event		Winning team	Runner-up team
Swedish European Qualifier; Jönköping, Sep. 11–13	M	Oskar Eriksson	Fredrik Nyman
Swedish European Qualifier; Jönköping, Sep. 11–13	W	Isabella Wranå	Molly Mabergs
The Battle; Port Elgin, Ontario, Sep. 25–27		(Alberta) Brad Jacobs	(Ontario) Rachel Homan
Italian European Qualifier; Cembra, Oct. 3–9	M	Stefano Spiller	Joël Retornaz
Italian European Qualifier; Cembra, Oct. 3–9	W	Giulia Zardini Lacedelli	Stefania Constantini
United States World Mixed Doubles Qualifier; Eau Claire, Wisconsin, Oct. 28 – Nov. 1		(Minnesota) Thiesse / Dropkin	(Minnesota) Fenson / Stopera
FISU Canadian Mixed Doubles Qualifier; Toronto, Ontario, Oct. 29 – Nov. 1		(Nova Scotia) MacNutt / Mosher	(Ontario) Marcolini / Jewell
German World Mixed Doubles Trials; Füssen, Nov. 10–13		(Bavaria) Tiuliakova / Totzek	(Bavaria) Sutor / Kapp
Czech World Mixed Doubles Qualifier; Prague, Nov. 14–17		(Prague) Zelingrová / Chabičovský	(Prague) Paulová / Paul

== Curling Canada events ==
=== Championships ===
Event		Gold	Silver	Bronze
Canadian Mixed Curling Championship; Woodstock, Prince Edward Island, Nov. 8–14		Nova Scotia (MacDougall)	New Brunswick (Quillian)	Northern Ontario (Burgess)
Canadian Curling Club Championships; St. Thomas, Ontario, Nov. 21–28	M			
Canadian Curling Club Championships; St. Thomas, Ontario, Nov. 21–28	W			
Canadian Senior Curling Championships; Saskatoon, Saskatchewan, Dec. 5–12	M			
Canadian Senior Curling Championships; Saskatoon, Saskatchewan, Dec. 5–12	W			
Scotties Tournament of Hearts; Charlottetown, Prince Edward Island, Feb. 12–21				
U Sports/Curling Canada University Curling Championships; Calgary, Alberta, Feb. 22–26	M			
U Sports/Curling Canada University Curling Championships; Calgary, Alberta, Feb. 22–26	W			
CCAA/Curling Canada College Curling Championships; Calgary, Alberta, Feb. 22–26	M			
CCAA/Curling Canada College Curling Championships; Calgary, Alberta, Feb. 22–26	W			
Montana's Brier; Saskatoon, Saskatchewan, Feb. 26 – Mar. 7				
Canadian Junior Curling Championships; Rivière-du-Loup, Quebec, Mar. 20–27	M			
Canadian Junior Curling Championships; Rivière-du-Loup, Quebec, Mar. 20–27	W			
Canadian U18 Curling Championships; Okotoks, Alberta, Apr. 18–24	M			
Canadian U18 Curling Championships; Okotoks, Alberta, Apr. 18–24	W			
Canadian Wheelchair Curling Championship; Richmond, British Columbia, Apr. 19–24				

=== Invitationals ===
Event	Winning skip	Runner-up skip
U25 NextGen Classic; Edmonton, Alberta, Aug. 23–25	(Alberta) Cinnamon / Tao	(Alberta) (Ontario) Gray-Withers / Pietrangelo

=== Provincial and Territorial Playdowns ===
Province/ Territory	Women			Men			Mixed Doubles	
Province/ Territory	Event	Champion	Runner-up	Event	Champion	Runner-up	Champion	Runner-up
Alberta; Drayton Valley, Jan. 10–17	Alberta Women's Championship			Alberta Men's Championship				
British Columbia; Chilliwack, Jan. 11–17	BC Women's Championship			BC Men's Championship				
Manitoba; Gimli, Jan. 12–17 (Women's); Altona, Jan. 27–31 (Men's)	RME Women of the Rings			Bunge Championship				
New Brunswick; Saint John, Jan. 12–17	New Brunswick; Women's Championship			New Brunswick Tankard				
Newfoundland and Labrador; St. John's, Jan. 2–8	Newfoundland and Labrador; Women's Championship			Newfoundland and Labrador Tankard				
Northern Ontario; Kakabeka Falls, Jan. 13–17 (Women's); Fort Frances, Jan. 27–31 (Men's)	Northern Ontario; Women's Championship			Northern Ontario; Men's Provincial Championship				
Northwest Territories; Hay River, Jan. 6–11 (Women's); Inuvik, Jan. 20–25 (Men's)	NWT Women's Championship			NWT Men's Championship				
Nova Scotia; Timberlea, Jan. 12–17	Ocean Contractors; Women's Championship			Ocean Contractors; Men's Championship				
Nunavut; TBD	Nunavut; Women's Championship			Nunavut Men's Championship				
Ontario; Cornwall, Jan. 11–17	Ontario; Women's Championship			Ontario Men's Championship				
Prince Edward Island; Cornwall, Jan. 12–17	PEI Women's Championship			PEI Men's Championship				
Quebec; Rouyn-Noranda, Jan. 10–17	Quebec; Women's Championship			Quebec Tankard				
Saskatchewan; Lloydminster, Jan. 10–17	Bunge Prairie Pinnacle			SaskTel Tankard				
Yukon; Whitehorse, Jan. 7–10	Yukon Women's Championship			Yukon Men's Championship				

== National championships ==
=== Australia ===
Event		Gold	Silver	Bronze
Australian Men's Curling Championship; Naseby, New Zealand, May 17–22		Hugh Millikin	Ian Gagnon	Matt Panoussi
Australian Women's Curling Championship; Naseby, New Zealand, May 17–22		Anne Powell	Amanda Hlushak	Roslyn Gallagher
Australian Mixed Doubles Curling Championship; Naseby, New Zealand, May 23–27		Wytrychowski / Hewitt	Forge / Bence	Szentannai / Williams
Australian Junior Curling Championships; Auckland, New Zealand, July 4–5	M	Matthew Collins	Ashton Collins	–
Australian Junior Curling Championships; Auckland, New Zealand, July 4–5	W	Holly Douglas	Alexandra Webster	–
Australian Junior Mixed Doubles Curling Championship; Auckland, New Zealand, July 6–9		Douglas / Collins	Forge / Ryan	Webster / Collins
Australian Senior Curling Championships; Auckland, New Zealand, July 4–9	M	Hugh Millikin	Hamish Lorrain-Smith	Brad Scott
Australian Senior Curling Championships; Auckland, New Zealand, July 4–9	W	Lyn Gill	–	
Australian Mixed Curling Championship; Auckland, New Zealand, July 13–17		Matt Panoussi	Hugh Millikin	Sean Hall

=== Japan ===
Event		Gold	Silver	Bronze
Japan Curling Championships; Yokohama, Kanagawa, Jun. 7–14	M	(Nagano Prefecture) Tsuyoshi Yamaguchi	(Hokkaido) Takumi Maeda	(Nagano Prefecture) Kaito Fujii
Japan Curling Championships; Yokohama, Kanagawa, Jun. 7–14	W	(Nagano Prefecture) Miyu Ueno	(Hokkaido) Miku Nihira	(Hokkaido) Sayaka Yoshimura

=== New Zealand ===
Event		Gold	Silver	Bronze
New Zealand Mixed Curling Championship; Auckland, May. 30 – Jun. 1		Rachael Pitts	Brett Sargon	William Sheard
New Zealand Mixed Doubles Curling Championship; Naseby, Jun. 18–21		Michels / Smith	Kinney / Walker	James / Hood
New Zealand Men's Curling Championship; Naseby, Jul. 1–5		Anton Hood	Sam Flanagan	William Sheard
New Zealand Women's Curling Championship; Naseby, Jul. 1–5		Rachael Pitts	Sasha Goloborodko	Olivia Russell
New Zealand Junior Mixed Doubles Championship; Naseby, Jul. 30 – Aug. 1		McKenzie / Nevill	Jones / Bankshaw	Hepi / Russell
New Zealand Senior Curling Championships; Naseby, Aug. 14–17	M	Peter de Boer	Peter Becker	Matt Whineray
New Zealand Senior Curling Championships; Naseby, Aug. 14–17	W	Jo Olszewski	–	
New Zealand Junior Curling Championships; Naseby, Aug. 20–23	M	Abraham Chanwong	Jed Nevill	–
New Zealand Junior Curling Championships; Naseby, Aug. 20–23	W	Olivia Russell	Isobel Day	Samantha Dorreen

=== Scotland ===
Event	Gold	Silver	Bronze
Scottish Mixed Doubles Curling Championship; Aberdeen, Oct. 1–4	Drummond / Kyle	McMillan / Hyslop	Dodds / Carson; Jackson / McFadzean

=== South Korea ===
Event	Gold	Silver	Bronze
Korean Men's Curling Championship; Uiseong, Jun. 11–16	Jeong Byeong-jin	Kim Chang-min	Park Jong-duk
Korean Women's Curling Championship; Uiseong, Jun. 11–16	Gim Eun-ji	Park You-been	Ha Seung-youn; Kim Ji-yoon
Korean Mixed Doubles Curling Championship; Uiseong, Jun. 19–23	Kang / Kim	Kim / Kwon	Park / Choi; Won / Kim

== Tour events ==
=== Men's events ===
Week	Event	Winning skip	Runner-up skip	Purse	Winner's share	Tour	SFM
2	Baden Masters; Baden, Switzerland, Aug. 13–16	(Switzerland) Yannick Schwaller	(Italy) Joël Retornaz	CHF 25,000	CHF 9,000	World Curling	6.3
3	Euro Super Series; Stirling, Scotland, Aug. 20–23	(Switzerland) Yannick Schwaller	(Scotland) Grant Hardie	£9,500	£3,000	Grand Slam Satellite Event	6.7
3	Hokkaido Bank Curling Classic; Sapporo, Japan, Aug. 20–23	(Japan) Takumi Maeda	(Japan) Tsuyoshi Yamaguchi	¥1,720,000	¥1,000,000	Hokkaido Curling	2.4
4	Wakkanai Midori Challenge Cup; Wakkanai, Japan, Aug. 27–30	(Japan) Tsuyoshi Yamaguchi	(Japan) Shinya Abe	¥1,420,000	¥800,000	Hokkaido Curling	2.4
4	Asham Icebreaker; Morris, Manitoba, Aug. 28–30	(United States) Caden Hebert	(United States) Scott Dunnam	CA$4,800	CA$1,200	Manitoba Curling	2.4
5	Hogged Rock KW Fall Classic; Waterloo, Ontario, Sep. 4–7	(Switzerland) Kim Schwaller	(Italy) Stefano Spiller	CA$15,000	CA$4,000	Ontario Curling	4.9
5	Oslo Cup; Oslo, Norway, Sep. 3–6	(Sweden) Oskar Eriksson	(Norway) Lukas Høstmælingen	kr 81,000	kr 35,000	Nordic Curling	3.9
5	ADVICS Cup; Kitami, Japan, Sep. 3–6	(Japan) Takumi Maeda	(Japan) Kohsuke Hirata	¥1,720,000	¥1,000,000	Hokkaido Curling	2.0
6	Stu Sells Oakville Tankard; Oakville, Ontario, Sep. 10–14	(United States) Daniel Casper	(Manitoba) Jordon McDonald	CA$48,000	CA$16,000	Grand Slam Satellite Event; Stu Sells Ontario Curling	7.9
6	Saville Shootout; Edmonton, Alberta, Sep. 11–14	(Germany) Benjamin Kapp	(British Columbia) Jim Cotter	CA$25,000	CA$6,000	Alberta Curling	4.1
6	Rice Lake Competitor Spiel; Rice Lake, Wisconsin, Sep. 11–13	(United States) Austin Kadlec	(United States) Aaron Carlson	US$4,000	US$1,600	—	0.8
7	AMJ Shorty Jenkins Classic; Cornwall, Ontario, Sep. 16–20	(Scotland) Grant Hardie	(Manitoba) John Epping	CA$60,000	CA$15,000	Grand Slam Satellite Event; Ontario Curling	5.9
7	Saville Grand Prix; Edmonton, Alberta, Sep. 18–21	(Alberta) Jaxon Hiebert	(Alberta) Evan van Amsterdam	CA$20,000	CA$5,000	Alberta Curling	3.8
7	Karuizawa International; Karuizawa, Japan, Sep. 17–20	(Japan) Tsuyoshi Yamaguchi	(Japan) Takumi Maeda	¥1,500,000	¥700,000	Grand Slam Satellite Event	3.3
7	Tournoi Equinoxe Open; Montreal, Quebec, Sep. 18–20	(Quebec) Sylvain Bellavance	(Quebec) Mike Kennedy	CA$10,000	CA$2,000	Quebec Provincial Circuit	1.0
8	ATB Okotoks Classic; Okotoks, Alberta, Sep. 24–27	(Manitoba) Matt Dunstone	(Switzerland) Marco Hösli	CA$42,000	CA$12,000	Grand Slam Satellite Event; Alberta Curling	6.2
8	Sutherland SaskTour Icebreaker; Saskatoon, Saskatchewan, Sep. 25–27	(Saskatchewan) Jason Jacobson	(Saskatchewan) Dylan Derksen	CA$4,000	CA$1,500	Sask Curling	1.8
8	Mother Club Fall Curling Classic; Winnipeg, Manitoba, Sep. 24–27	(Manitoba) Hayden Forrester	(Manitoba) Brett Walter	CA$7,000	CA$2,000	Manitoba Curling	1.7
8	Tallinn Mens International Challenger; Tallinn, Estonia, Sep. 25–27	(Norway) Lukas Høstmælingen	(Norway) Magnus Ramsfjell	€6,000	€1,200	Nordic Curling	1.4
8	Invitation Valleyfield; Salaberry-de-Valleyfield, Quebec, Sep. 24–27	(Quebec) Raphaël Tremblay	(Quebec) Mike Kennedy	CA$11,500	CA$3,500	Quebec Provincial Circuit	1.3
9	Prestige Hotels & Resorts Curling Classic; Vernon, British Columbia, Oct. 2–5	(Switzerland) Marco Hösli	(Japan) Tsuyoshi Yamaguchi	CA$28,000	CA$6,000	Grand Slam Satellite Event; British Columbia Curling	4.9
9	Match Town Trophy; Jönköping, Sweden, Oct. 1–4	(Denmark) Jacob Schmidt	(Sweden) Daniel Magnusson	kr 60,000	kr 30,000	Nordic Curling	2.0
9	McKee Homes Fall Curling Classic; Airdrie, Alberta, Oct. 2–4	(Japan) Kohsuke Hirata	(Alberta) Darren Moulding	CA$15,000	CA$4,000	Alberta Curling	1.7
9	Collingwood Challenger; Collingwood, Ontario, Oct. 3–4	(Ontario) Nathan Young	(Ontario) Daniel Hocevar	CA$6,000	CA$2,000	Ontario Curling	1.5
10	Nufloors Penticton Curling Classic; Penticton, British Columbia, Oct. 8–11	(Sweden) Oskar Eriksson	(Switzerland) Marco Hösli	CA$88,000	CA$23,000	British Columbia Curling	6.2
10	Stu Sells Toronto Tankard; Toronto, Ontario, Oct. 8–12	(Germany) Benjamin Kapp	(Manitoba) John Epping	CA$29,000	CA$10,000	Stu Sells Ontario Curling	4.3
10	Swiss Cup Basel; Arlesheim, Switzerland, Oct. 9–11	(Czech Republic) Lukáš Klíma	(Italy) Stefano Spiller	CHF 25,000	CHF 10,000	—	4.0
10	St. Paul Cashspiel; Saint Paul, Minnesota, Oct. 8–11	(United States) John Shuster	(Manitoba) Jace Freeman	US$25,000	US$9,000	Grand Slam Satellite Event	3.3
10	Regina Highland Rocktoberfest; Regina, Saskatchewan, Oct. 9–12	(Saskatchewan) Kelly Knapp	(Saskatchewan) Jason Jacobson	CA$7,000	CA$2,000	Sask Curling	1.8
10	IcePad Tournoi Elite de Trois-Rivières; Trois-Rivières, Quebec, Oct. 9–12	(Quebec) Jean-Michel Ménard	(Quebec) Normand Bornais	CA$20,000	CA$6,000	Quebec Provincial Circuit	1.0
10	MCT Challenge; Winnipeg, Manitoba, Oct. 9–12	Cancelled					
11	Co-op Invitational; Victoria, British Columbia, Oct. 13–18	(Switzerland) Yannick Schwaller	(Norway) Magnus Ramsfjell	CA$200,000	CA$40,000	Grand Slam	10.0
11	Saville U25 Challenge; Edmonton, Alberta, Oct. 16–19	(Alberta) Peter Hlushak	(Alberta) Jaxon Hiebert	CA$8,800	CA$2,400	Grand Slam Satellite Event; Alberta Curling	3.6
11	Grand Prix Bern Inter Curling Challenge; Bern, Switzerland, Oct. 16–18	(Italy) Stefano Spiller	(Italy) Alberto Zisa	CHF 16,500	CHF 5,000	—	3.3
11	Island Shootout; Victoria, British Columbia, Oct. 15–18	(South Korea) Jeong Yeong-seok	(British Columbia) Neil Dangerfield	CA$8,500	CA$2,000	British Columbia Curling	1.3
11	Prague Classic; Prague, Czech Republic, Oct. 15–18	(Czech Republic) Lukáš Klíma	(Austria) Mathias Genner	€5,145	€1,800	World Curling	1.3
11	MCT Curling Cup; Winnipeg, Manitoba, Oct. 16–18	(United States) Timothy Hodek	(Manitoba) Braden Calvert	CA$5,500	CA$2,000	Manitoba Curling	1.3
11	Stroud Sleeman Cash Spiel; Stroud, Ontario, Oct. 15–18	(Ontario) Sandy MacEwan	(Ontario) Scott Foster	CA$6,250	CA$2,000	Ontario Curling	1.1
12	Henderson Metal Fall Classic; Sault Ste. Marie, Ontario, Oct. 21–24	(Manitoba) John Epping	(Italy) Joël Retornaz	CA$100,000	CA$21,000	Grand Slam Satellite Event; Ontario Curling	5.8
12	S3 Group Curling Stadium Series; Swift Current, Saskatchewan, Oct. 23–25	(Saskatchewan) Catlin Schneider	(Ontario) Owen Nicholls	CA$5,900	CA$1,700	Sask Curling	2.1
12	Dave Jones Mayflower Cashspiel; Timberlea, Nova Scotia, Oct. 22–25	(Nova Scotia) Nick Mosher	(Nova Scotia) Kendal Thompson	CA$17,000	CA$4,700	—	1.5
12	Sundbyberg Open; Sundbyberg, Sweden, Oct. 22–25	(Denmark) Jacob Schmidt	(Sweden) Axel Landelius	kr 50,000	kr 15,000	Nordic Curling	1.5
13	RBC Dominion Securities Western Showdown; Swift Current, Saskatchewan, Oct. 29 – Nov. 1	(Italy) Joël Retornaz	(Saskatchewan) Tyler Tardi	CA$36,000	CA$10,000	Sask Curling	6.0
13	MCT Atkins Curling Supplies Classic; Winnipeg, Manitoba, Oct. 30 – Nov. 1	(Manitoba) Jace Freeman	(Manitoba) Hayden Forrester	CA$11,000	CA$2,400	Manitoba Curling	2.0
13	Rick Rowsell Classic; St. John's, Newfoundland and Labrador, Oct. 29 – Nov. 1	(Newfoundland and Labrador) Simon Perry	(Newfoundland and Labrador) Stephen Trickett	CA$7,000	CA$2,000	—	0.9
13	Challenge Nord-Ouest Air Creebec; Val-d'Or, Quebec, Oct. 29 – Nov. 1	(Quebec) Raphaël Tremblay	(Quebec) Sylvain Bellavance	CA$8,200	CA$3,100	Quebec Provincial Circuit	0.8
13	Lakeside Levelling Charity Open; Thunder Bay, Ontario, Oct. 30 – Nov. 1	(Ontario) Trevor Bonot	(Ontario) Tyler Stewart	CA$7,000	CA$2,000	Ontario Curling	0.7
14	P&H Masters; Medicine Hat, Alberta, Nov. 3–8	(Manitoba) Matt Dunstone	(Scotland) Bruce Mouat	CA$175,000	CA$20,000	Grand Slam	10.0
14	Original 16 Men's Cash Spiel; Calgary, Alberta, Nov. 6–8	(Saskatchewan) Mike McEwen	(British Columbia) Mitchell Kopytko	CA$21,000	CA$6,000	Alberta Curling	2.9
14	Major Welding Abbotsford Cashspiel; Abbotsford, British Columbia, Nov. 6–8	(British Columbia) Jason Montgomery	(British Columbia) Alex Horvath	CA$18,000	CA$6,000	British Columbia Curling	1.6
14	MCT Showdown; Virden, Manitoba, Nov. 6–8	(Manitoba) Braden Calvert	(Manitoba) Brett Walter	CA$9,000		Manitoba Curling	—
15	Stu Sells 1824 Halifax Classic; Halifax, Nova Scotia, Nov. 11–15	(Switzerland) Marco Hösli	(Switzerland) Yannick Schwaller	CA$25,500	CA$8,000	Grand Slam Satellite Event; Stu Sells	5.3
15	15 & 5 Manufacturing Red Deer Curling Classic; Red Deer, Alberta, Nov. 13–16	(Saskatchewan) Tyler Tardi	(Alberta) Kevin Koe	CA$46,000	CA$10,000	Alberta Curling	4.9
15	Nutana SaskTour Men's Spiel; Saskatoon, Saskatchewan, Nov. 13–15	(Saskatchewan) Matt Lang	(Saskatchewan) Kelly Knapp	CA$6,780	CA$1,800	Sask Curling	1.7
15	COMCO Cash Spiel; Stroud, Ontario, Nov. 13–15	(United States) Scott Dunnam	(Ontario) Daniel Hocevar	CA$12,550	CA$3,000	Ontario Curling	1.6
15	Fargo Cash Spiel; Fargo, North Dakota, Nov. 13–15	(United States) Austin Kadlec	(United States) Timothy Hodek	US$8,000	US$2,000	—	0.9
16	HearingLife National; Sydney, Nova Scotia, Nov. 17–22					Grand Slam	10.0
16	Broken Broom Tobacco Belt Cash Spiel; Tillsonburg, Ontario, Nov. 19–22					Ontario Curling	
16	Seoul Curling Cup International; Seoul, South Korea, Nov. 19–22	(Saskatchewan) Dylan Derksen	(Poland) Konrad Stych			—	
16	Kamloops Crown of Curling; Kamloops, British Columbia, Nov. 20–22					British Columbia Curling	
16	MCT Shootout; Virden, Manitoba, Nov. 20–22					Manitoba Curling	
16	Jim Sullivan Curling Classic; Fredericton, New Brunswick, Nov. 20–22					—	
17	Morris Superspiel; Morris, Manitoba, Nov. 26–29					Manitoba Curling	
17	Charlevoix Challenge de Curling Desjardins; Charlevoix, Quebec, Nov. 26–29					Quebec Provincial Circuit	
17	King Cash Spiel; Maple Ridge, British Columbia, Nov. 27–29					British Columbia Curling	
17	Original 16 Broomstacker; Wadena, Saskatchewan, Nov. 27–29					Sask Curling	
17	Classique Lions Desjardins; La Sarre, Quebec, Nov. 27–29					Quebec Provincial Circuit	
17	Island Petroleum Cashspiel; Summerside, Prince Edward Island, Nov. 27–29					—	
18	GSOC Open; Thunder Bay, Ontario, Dec. 1–6					Grand Slam	10.0
18	Stu Sells Brantford NISSAN Classic; Brantford, Ontario, Dec. 4–7					Ontario Curling	
18	Vic Open; Quebec City, Quebec, Dec. 4–6					Quebec Provincial Circuit	
18	Moose Jaw SaskTour Spiel; Moose Jaw, Saskatchewan, Dec. 4–6					Sask Curling	
19	Take-Out Trophy; Basel, Switzerland, Dec. 11–13					—	
19	Duluth Cash Spiel; Duluth, Minnesota, Dec. 11–13					Ontario Curling	
20	KIOTI Players' Cup; Kingston, Ontario, Dec. 15–20					Grand Slam	10.0
20	Granite Helmet Cash Classic; Oromocto, New Brunswick, Dec. 17–20					—	
20	Chicoutimi Invitational; Chicoutimi, Quebec, Dec. 17–20					Quebec Provincial Circuit	
20	Aberdeen Winter Classic; Aberdeen, Scotland, Dec. 18–20					—	
21	Ed Werenich Golden Wrench Classic; Tempe, Arizona, Dec. 31 – Jan. 3					—	
22	Sapporo Curling Trophy; Sapporo, Japan, Jan. 8–11					—	
23	Perth Masters; Perth, Scotland, Jan. 14–17					Grand Slam Satellite Event	
24	St. Galler Elite Challenge; St. Gallen, Switzerland, Jan. 22–25					World Curling	
25	Brno Men's Winter Classic; Brno, Czech Republic, Jan. 28–31					Nordic Curling	
26	Martensville International; Martensville, Saskatchewan, Feb. 4–7					Sask Curling	
29	Danish Open; Copenhagen, Denmark, Feb. 25–28					Nordic Curling	
32	Speedy Creek Shootout; Swift Current, Saskatchewan, Mar. 18–21					Sask Curling	
32	Aberdeen International Curling Championship; Aberdeen, Scotland, Mar. 18–21					—	
34	MCT Slam Satellite; Winnipeg, Manitoba, Apr. 1–4					Grand Slam Satellite Event	

=== Women's events ===
Week	Event	Winning skip	Runner-up skip	Purse	Winner's share	Tour	SFM
2	Curling1spoon Elite 8 Uiseong, South Korea, Jul. 30 – Aug. 2	(South Korea) Park You-been	(South Korea) Kim Kyeong-ae	₩9,750,000	₩5,000,000	—	3.6
3	Hokkaido Bank Curling Classic; Sapporo, Japan, Aug. 20–23	(Japan) Miku Nihira	(Japan) Kotone Suzuki	¥1,720,000	¥1,000,000	Hokkaido Curling	5.3
3	Euro Super Series; Stirling, Scotland, Aug. 20–23	(Switzerland) Alina Pätz	(Switzerland) Xenia Schwaller	£9,500	£3,000	Grand Slam Satellite Event	4.4
4	Wakkanai Midori Challenge Cup; Wakkanai, Japan, Aug. 27–30	(Japan) Miyu Ueno	(Japan) Miku Nihira	¥1,420,000	¥800,000	Hokkaido Curling	4.5
4	Oslo Cup; Oslo, Norway, Aug. 27–30	(Sweden) Isabella Wranå	(Norway) Torild Bjørnstad	kr 77,000	kr 35,000	Nordic Curling	3.4
4	Asham Icebreaker; Morris, Manitoba, Aug. 28–30	(Alberta) Selena Sturmay	(Alberta) Serena Gray-Withers	CA$4,000	CA$1,200	Manitoba Curling	3.1
5	Hogged Rock KW Fall Classic; Waterloo, Ontario, Sep. 4–7	(Switzerland) Xenia Schwaller	(Ontario) Kira Brunton	CA$15,000	CA$4,000	Ontario Curling	4.6
5	ADVICS Cup; Kitami, Japan, Sep. 3–6	(Japan) Miku Nihira	(Japan) Satsuki Fujisawa	¥1,720,000	¥1,000,000	Hokkaido Curling	4.4
6	Stu Sells Oakville Tankard; Oakville, Ontario, Sep. 10–14	(Switzerland) Alina Pätz	(Switzerland) Xenia Schwaller	CA$36,000	CA$11,000	Grand Slam Satellite Event; Stu Sells Ontario Curling	5.9
6	Saville Shootout; Edmonton, Alberta, Sep. 11–14	(Alberta) Serena Gray-Withers	(Alberta) Selena Sturmay	CA$25,000	CA$6,000	Alberta Curling	5.3
6	ARGO GRAPHICS Cup; Kitami, Japan, Sep. 10–13	(Japan) Ikue Kitazawa	(Japan) Yuina Miura	¥1,720,000	¥1,000,000	Hokkaido Curling	3.4
6	Rice Lake Competitor Spiel; Rice Lake, Wisconsin, Sep. 11–13	(United States) Ann Podoll	(United States) Julie Segovia	US$2,000	US$1,200	—	0.7
7	AMJ Shorty Jenkins Classic; Cornwall, Ontario, Sep. 16–20	(Switzerland) Alina Pätz	(Switzerland) Xenia Schwaller	CA$45,000	CA$12,000	Grand Slam Satellite Event; Ontario Curling	5.8
7	Saville Grand Prix; Edmonton, Alberta, Sep. 18–21	(Alberta) Selena Sturmay	(South Korea) Park You-been	CA$22,000	CA$6,000	Alberta Curling	5.4
7	Karuizawa International; Karuizawa, Japan, Sep. 17–20	(Sweden) Isabella Wranå	(South Korea) Kim Kyeong-ae	¥1,500,000	¥700,000	Grand Slam Satellite Event	5.1
8	Mother Club Fall Curling Classic; Winnipeg, Manitoba, Sep. 24–27	(Manitoba) Nancy Martin	(Manitoba) Shaela Hayward	CA$11,000	CA$2,500	Manitoba Curling	2.7
8	Sutherland SaskTour Icebreaker; Saskatoon, Saskatchewan, Sep. 25–27	(Saskatchewan) Penny Barker	(Saskatchewan) Amber Holland	CA$4,000	CA$1,500	Sask Curling	1.9
8	Riga International Curling Challenge; Riga, Latvia, Sep. 25–27	(Latvia) Evelīna Barone	(Ukraine) Kateryna Yakymets	€1,800	€1,000	—	0.9
9	Prestige Hotels & Resorts Curling Classic; Vernon, British Columbia, Oct. 1–4	(South Korea) Gim Eun-ji	(Japan) Yuina Miura	CA$28,000	CA$6,000	Grand Slam Satellite Event; British Columbia Curling	6.3
9	McKee Homes Fall Curling Classic; Airdrie, Alberta, Oct. 2–4	(South Korea) Ha Seung-youn	(South Korea) Kim Eun-jung	CA$15,000	CA$4,000	Alberta Curling	2.7
9	Match Town Trophy; Jönköping, Sweden, Oct. 1–4	(Italy) Stefania Constantini	(Sweden) Erika Ryberg	kr 60,000	kr 30,000	Nordic Curling	1.9
10	Autumn Gold Curling Classic; Okotoks, Alberta, Oct. 8–11	(Alberta) Selena Sturmay	(South Korea) Gim Eun-ji	CA$45,000	CA$11,000	Grand Slam Satellite Event; Alberta Curling	8.0
10	Stu Sells Toronto Tankard; Toronto, Ontario, Oct. 8–12	(Nova Scotia) Christina Black	(South Korea) Park You-been	CA$29,000	CA$10,000	Stu Sells Ontario Curling	5.4
10	St. Paul Cashspiel; Saint Paul, Minnesota, Oct. 8–11	(United States) Anne O'Hara	(Japan) Satsuki Fujisawa	US$20,700	US$7,000	Grand Slam Satellite Event	3.8
10	Tallinn Ladies International Challenger; Tallinn, Estonia, Oct. 8–11	(Switzerland) Zoe Schwaller	(Scotland) Fay Henderson	€6,500	€3,000	Nordic Curling	2.6
10	Regina Highland Rocktoberfest; Regina, Saskatchewan, Oct. 9–12	(Saskatchewan) Sara Miller	(Manitoba) Nancy Martin	CA$7,000	CA$2,000	Sask Curling	2.6
10	MCT Challenge; Winnipeg, Manitoba, Oct. 9–12	Cancelled					
11	Co-op Invitational; Victoria, British Columbia, Oct. 13–18	(Manitoba) Kerri Einarson	(South Korea) Kim Kyeong-ae	CA$200,000	CA$40,000	Grand Slam	10.0
11	Saville U25 Challenge; Edmonton, Alberta, Oct. 16–19	(Ontario) Grace Lloyd	(South Korea) Park You-been	CA$8,800	CA$2,400	Grand Slam Satellite Event; Alberta Curling	4.0
11	Island Shootout; Victoria, British Columbia, Oct. 15–18	(Japan) Ikue Kitazawa	(South Korea) Kim Hye-rin	CA$4,300	CA$1,500	British Columbia Curling	2.6
11	MCT Curling Cup; Winnipeg, Manitoba, Oct. 16–18	(Manitoba) Kelsey Calvert	(Manitoba) Rhonda Varnes	CA$7,475	CA$1,975	Manitoba Curling	2.3
11	Stroud Sleeman Cash Spiel; Stroud, Ontario, Oct. 15–18	(Ontario) Sherry Middaugh	(Ontario) Chelsea Principi	CA$8,500	CA$3,000	Ontario Curling	2.2
11	Prague Ladies International; Prague, Czech Republic, Oct. 15–18	(Latvia) Evelīna Barone	(Czech Republic) Alžběta Zelingrová	€3,800	€1,800	World Curling	1.4
12	Lloydminster SaskTour Spiel; Lloydminster, Saskatchewan, Oct. 23–25	(South Korea) Ha Seung-youn	(South Korea) Kim Eun-jung	CA$7,750	CA$2,000	Sask Curling	2.6
12	Sundbyberg Open; Sundbyberg, Sweden, Oct. 22–25	(Switzerland) Sarah Müller	(Poland) Marta Pluta	kr 50,000	kr 15,000	Nordic Curling	2.3
12	Dave Jones Mayflower Cashspiel; Timberlea, Nova Scotia, Oct. 22–25	(Nova Scotia) Christina Black	(Japan) Ikue Kitazawa	CA$8,800	CA$2,500	—	2.0
12	Clarion Cup; Rimbey, Alberta, Oct. 23–26	Cancelled					
13	RBC Dominion Securities Western Showdown; Swift Current, Saskatchewan, Oct. 29 – Nov. 1	(Japan) Miyu Ueno	(Japan) Ikue Kitazawa	CA$36,000	CA$10,000	Sask Curling	6.9
13	Rose Dolan Women's Fall Classic; Kemptville, Ontario, Oct. 29 – Nov. 1	(Ontario) Sherry Middaugh	(Ontario) Brooklyn Ideson	CA$27,500	CA$7,700	Ontario Curling	3.6
13	MCT Atkins Curling Supplies Classic; Winnipeg, Manitoba, Oct. 30 – Nov. 1	(Manitoba) Kelsey Calvert	(Manitoba) Christine MacKay	CA$10,500	CA$2,200	Manitoba Curling	2.7
13	Rick Rowsell Classic; St. John's, Newfoundland and Labrador, Oct. 29 – Nov. 1	(Newfoundland and Labrador) Cailey Locke	(Newfoundland and Labrador) Krista Crowther	CA$4,000	CA$1,500	—	0.6
14	P&H Masters; Medicine Hat, Alberta, Nov. 3–8	(Sweden) Isabella Wranå	(Japan) Miku Nihira	CA$175,000	CA$20,000	Grand Slam	10.0
14	Swiss Chalet Women's Curling Stadium Spiel; North Bay, Ontario, Nov. 5–8	(Ontario) Chelsea Principi	(South Korea) Kim Kyeong-ae	CA$10,000	CA$3,000	Grand Slam Satellite Event; Ontario Curling	5.1
14	Major Welding Abbotsford Cashspiel; Abbotsford, British Columbia, Nov. 6–8	(British Columbia) Holly Hafeli	(British Columbia) Diane Gushulak	CA$13,000	CA$5,500	British Columbia Curling	1.3
14	MCT Showdown; Stonewall, Manitoba, Nov. 6–8	(Manitoba) Beth Peterson	(Manitoba) Lisa McLeod	CA$9,000		Manitoba Curling	—
15	Stu Sells 1824 Halifax Classic; Halifax, Nova Scotia, Nov. 11–15	(Switzerland) Alina Pätz	(Japan) Ikue Kitazawa	CA$25,500	CA$8,000	Stu Sells	6.4
15	15 & 5 Manufacturing Red Deer Curling Classic; Red Deer, Alberta, Nov. 13–16	(Japan) Miyu Ueno	(Alberta) Kayla Skrlik	CA$39,000	CA$10,000	Alberta Curling	4.7
15	Nutana SaskTour Women's Spiel; Saskatoon, Saskatchewan, Nov. 13–15	(Saskatchewan) Penny Barker	(Saskatchewan) Skylar Ackerman	CA$8,000	CA$1,800	Sask Curling	2.5
15	Fargo Cash Spiel; Fargo, North Dakota, Nov. 13–15	(United States) Allory Johnson	(United States) Ann Podoll	US$8,000	US$1,600	—	1.7
16	HearingLife National; Sydney, Nova Scotia, Nov. 17–22					Grand Slam	10.0
16	Broken Broom Tobacco Belt Cash Spiel; Tillsonburg, Ontario, Nov. 19–22					Ontario Curling	
16	Seoul Curling Cup International; Seoul, South Korea, Nov. 19–22					—	
16	Kamloops Crown of Curling; Kamloops, British Columbia, Nov. 20–22					British Columbia Curling	
16	Gimli U25 Women's Cash Bonspiel; Gimli, Manitoba, Nov. 20–22					Manitoba Curling	
16	MCT Shootout; St. Claude, Manitoba, Nov. 20–22					Manitoba Curling	
16	Jim Sullivan Curling Classic; Fredericton, New Brunswick, Nov. 20–22					—	
17	Morris Superspiel; Morris, Manitoba, Nov. 26–29					Manitoba Curling	
17	Charlevoix Challenge de Curling Desjardins; Charlevoix, Quebec, Nov. 26–29					Quebec Provincial Circuit	
17	King Cash Spiel; Maple Ridge, British Columbia, Nov. 27–29					British Columbia Curling	
17	Watrous SCT Women's Event; Watrous, Saskatchewan, Nov. 27–29					Sask Curling	
18	GSOC Open; Thunder Bay, Ontario, Dec. 1–6					Grand Slam	10.0
18	Stu Sells Brantford NISSAN Classic; Brantford, Ontario, Dec. 4–7					Ontario Curling	
18	Cornwall Cup; Cornwall, Prince Edward Island, Dec. 3–6					—	
18	Moose Jaw SaskTour Spiel; Moose Jaw, Saskatchewan, Dec. 4–6					Sask Curling	
19	Take-Out Trophy; Basel, Switzerland, Dec. 11–13					—	
19	Duluth Cash Spiel; Duluth, Minnesota, Dec. 11–13					Ontario Curling	
20	KIOTI Players' Cup; Kingston, Ontario, Dec. 15–20					Grand Slam	10.0
20	Granite Helmet Cash Classic; Oromocto, New Brunswick, Dec. 17–20					—	
20	Aberdeen Winter Classic; Aberdeen, Scotland, Dec. 18–20					—	
21	New Year Curling in Miyota; Miyota, Japan, Dec. 28 – Jan. 1					World Curling Japan	
22	Sapporo Curling Trophy; Sapporo, Japan, Jan. 8–11					—	
23	Perth Masters; Perth, Scotland, Jan. 14–17					Grand Slam Satellite Event	
24	International Bernese Ladies Cup; Bern, Switzerland, Jan. 21–24					—	
25	Brno Women's Winter Classic; Brno, Czech Republic, Jan. 28–31					Nordic Curling	
29	Danish Open; Copenhagen, Denmark, Feb. 25–28					Nordic Curling	
30	Martensville International; Martensville, Saskatchewan, Mar. 5–7					Sask Curling	
32	Speedy Creek Shootout; Swift Current, Saskatchewan, Mar. 18–21					Sask Curling	
34	MCT Slam Satellite; Winnipeg, Manitoba, Apr. 1–4					Grand Slam Satellite Event	

=== Mixed doubles events ===
Week	Event	Winning skip	Runner-up skip	Purse	Winner's share	Tour	SFM
1	Denver Mixed Doubles Cash Spiel; Golden, Colorado, June 4–7	(United States) Vaydich / Macomber	(United States) Moores / Wheeler	US$5,000	US$1,300	—	1.4
6	Tallinn Mixed Doubles International; Tallinn, Estonia, Sept. 10–13	(Norway) Kjærland / Brænden	(Sweden) Westman / Ahlberg	€6,000	€1,400	Nordic Curling	3.6
7	City View Mixed Doubles Kickoff; Ottawa, Ontario, September 17–20	(Ontario) Ford / Campbell	(Ontario) Smith / Forget	CA$6,300	CA$1,500	Ontario Mixed Doubles Curling	1.6
8	Guelph Mixed Doubles Early Bird; Guelph, Ontario, Sep. 25–27	(Ontario) Neil / McDonald	(Ontario) Wasylkiw / Konings	CA$7,000	CA$2,200	Ontario Mixed Doubles Curling	3.2
8	Colorado Curling Cup; Lafayette, Colorado, Sep. 24–27	(Australia) Wytrychowski / Hewitt	(United States) Bear / Oldenburg	US$16,000	US$5,000	—	2.4
9	Kemptville Mixed Doubles Fall Classic; Kemptville, Ontario, Oct. 2–4	(Ontario) Kreviazuk / Mathers	(Ontario) Spruit / Spruit	CA$7,300	CA$2,000	Ontario Mixed Doubles Curling	2.7
9	Mixed Doubles Super Series: Moncton; Moncton, New Brunswick, Oct. 1–4	(China) Guo / Yu	(Nova Scotia) Powers / Saunders	CA$11,500	CA$4,000	Super Series	2.3
9	GOLDLINE Mixed Doubles Chicoutimi; Chicoutimi, Quebec, Oct. 2–4	(Quebec) Cottenoir / Charest	(Quebec) Tremblay / Lanoue	CA$6,900	CA$1,500	Circuit Goldline	1.8
9	Rice Lake Superspiel; Rice Lake, Wisconsin, Oct. 1–4	(Estonia) Kaare / Lill	(United States) Bassiri / Kadlec	US$6,000	US$2,500	World Curling	1.4
10	Madtown Doubledown; McFarland, Wisconsin, Oct. 8–11	(Norway) Kjærland / Brænden	(Norway) Skaslien / Nedregotten	US$25,000	US$6,200	—	4.8
10	Cloverdale Thanksgiving Mixed Doubles Classic; Surrey, British Columbia, Oct. 9–12	(British Columbia) Fitzgibbon / McKenzie	(British Columbia) Jensen / Meister	CA$6,500	CA$2,000	British Columbia Curling	1.1
11	GOLDLINE Mixed Doubles Mont-Bruno; Saint-Bruno-de-Montarville, Quebec, Oct. 16–18	(Quebec) Tremblay / Lanoue	(Quebec) Sanscartier / Caron	CA$7,000	CA$1,600	Circuit Goldline	2.4
11	Keith Martin Memorial Mixed Doubles; Arthur, Ontario, Oct. 16–18	(United States) Senneker / Visnich	(Ontario) Weeks / Steep	CA$6,950	CA$2,200	Ontario Mixed Doubles Curling	2.3
11	Martensville Mixed Doubles; Martensville, Saskatchewan, Oct. 16–18	(Saskatchewan) Springer / Springer	(China) Guo / Yu	CA$5,000	CA$1,200	Sask Curling	1.3
12	Mixed Doubles Bern; Bern, Switzerland, Oct. 23–25	(Sweden) Westman / Ahlberg	(Japan) Koana / Aoki	CHF 13,500	CHF 4,000	—	6.1
12	Abbotsford Elite Mixed Doubles Classic; Abbotsford, British Columbia, Oct. 22–25	(British Columbia) Kopytko / Deng	(British Columbia) Woo / Wenzek	CA$7,000	CA$2,000	British Columbia Curling	1.1
12	Gage Mixed Doubles Warm-Up Spiel; Oromocto, New Brunswick, Oct. 23–25	Cancelled					
13	Mixed Doubles Gstaad; Gstaad, Switzerland, Oct. 27–29	(Japan) Koana / Aoki	(Australia) Wytrychowski / Hewitt	CHF 10,800	CHF 4,000	—	5.6
13	Mixed Doubles Super Series: Moose Jaw; Moose Jaw, Saskatchewan, Oct. 29 – Nov. 1	Cancelled					
14	GOLDLINE Mixed Doubles Rivière-du-Loup; Rivière-du-Loup, Quebec, Nov. 6–8	(Nova Scotia) Powers / Saunders	(New Brunswick) Watson / Beland	CA$4,000	CA$1,200	Circuit Goldline	3.3
14	Palmerston Mixed Doubles Spiel; Palmerston, Ontario, Nov. 6–9	(Ontario) Craig / Craig	(Ontario) Kiemele / Singer	CA$7,500	CA$2,000	Ontario Mixed Doubles Curling	2.7
14	Mixed Doubles Łódź; Łódź, Poland, Nov. 5–8	(Italy) Maurino / Gonin	(Poland) Walczak / Augustyniak	€5,000	€1,000	Nordic Curling	2.3
14	Chicago Mixed Doubles Dog Dare; Northbrook, Illinois, Nov. 5–8	(United States) Stewart / Axelsson	(United States) Thurston / Lannoye	US$5,600	US$1,500	—	0.7
15	Aly Jenkins Mixed Doubles Memorial; Martensville, Saskatchewan, Nov. 13–15	(Alberta) (Ontario) Gray-Withers / Pietrangelo	(China) Guo / Yu	CA$11,400	CA$2,400	Sask Curling	4.7
15	Ilderton Mixed Doubles Spiel; Ilderton, Ontario, Nov. 14–15	(Ontario) Fisher / Henry	(Ontario) Cave / King	CA$4,000	CA$1,500	Ontario Mixed Doubles Curling	1.9
15	HARDLINE Sherbrooke Mixed Doubles; Sherbrooke, Quebec, Nov. 13–15	(Quebec) Legault / Janidlo	(Quebec) Roy / Roy	CA$6,700	CA$1,300	—	0.9
15	Parksville Double Doubles Spiel; Parksville, British Columbia, Nov. 13–15	(British Columbia) Brissette / Fadden	(British Columbia) Kuhl / Kuhl	CA$6,800	CA$2,000	British Columbia Curling	0.6
16	Mixed Doubles Haugesund; Haugesund, Norway, Nov. 19–22	(Norway) Kjærland / Brænden	(Scotland) Dodds / Carson			Nordic Curling	
16	Hanover Mixed Doubles Spiel; Hanover, Ontario, Nov. 20–22					Ontario Mixed Doubles Curling	
16	Martensville Mixed Doubles; Martensville, Saskatchewan, Nov. 20–22					Sask Curling	
17	Mixed Doubles Super Series: East St. Paul; East St. Paul, Manitoba, Nov. 26–29					Super Series	
17	Southwestern Ontario Doubles; Forest, Ontario, Nov. 27–29					Ontario Mixed Doubles Curling	
18	Uppsala Mixed Doubles; Uppsala, Sweden, Dec. 3–6					Nordic Curling	
18	Montana's North Bay Mixed Doubles; North Bay, Ontario, Dec. 4–6					Ontario Mixed Doubles Curling	
18	Langley Mixed Doubles; Langley, British Columbia, Dec. 5–6					British Columbia Curling	
19	Mixed Doubles Super Series; Ontario, Dec. 10–13					Super Series	
19	St. Marys Mixed Doubles; St. Marys, Ontario, Dec. 11–13					Ontario Mixed Doubles Curling	
19	SaskTour Mixed Doubles: Grenfell; Grenfell, Saskatchewan, Dec. 11–13					Sask Curling	
19	Cincinnati Mixed Doubles Cup; Cincinnati, Ohio, Dec. 11–13					—	
21	Southern States Mixed Doubles; Charlotte, North Carolina, Dec. 31 – Jan. 3					—	
22	Galt Mixed Doubles; Galt, Ontario, Jan. 8–10					Ontario Mixed Doubles Curling	
23	Jamaica Cup Mixed Doubles Cashspiel; Dundas, Ontario, Jan. 16–17					Ontario Mixed Doubles Curling	
24	Tallinn Masters Mixed Doubles; Tallinn, Estonia, Jan. 21–24					Nordic Curling	
25	GOLDLINE Mixed Doubles Boucherville; Boucherville, Quebec, Jan. 29–31					Circuit Goldline	
25	Gage Mixed Doubles Cash Spiel; Oromocto, New Brunswick, Jan. 29–31					—	
25	Hvidovre Mixed Doubles Cup; Hvidovre, Denmark, Jan. 29–31					Nordic Curling	
25	WFG Okotoks Mixed Doubles Classic; Okotoks, Alberta, Jan. 29–31					—	
27	GOLDLINE Mixed Doubles Royal Montreal; Montreal, Quebec, Feb. 12–14					Circuit Goldline	
27	St. Thomas Mixed Doubles Classic; St. Thomas, Ontario, Feb. 12–14					Ontario Mixed Doubles Curling	
31	Saville Mixed Doubles Classic; Edmonton, Alberta, Mar. 12–14					—	
33	GOLDLINE Tour CurlBob Curling; Chicoutimi, Quebec, Mar. 26–28					Circuit Goldline	
34	Mixed Doubles Super Series: St. Thomas; St. Thomas, Ontario, Apr. 1–4					Super Series	

== World Curling team rankings ==
Men

After Week 15
#	Skip	YTD	OOM
1	(Switzerland) Yannick Schwaller	215.0	420.9
2	(Manitoba) Matt Dunstone	168.9	379.9
3	(Scotland) Grant Hardie	159.1	357.5
4	(Scotland) Bruce Mouat	63.8	296.7
5	(Alberta) Brad Jacobs	70.9	293.3
6	(United States) Daniel Casper	124.2	263.1
7	(Switzerland) Marco Hösli	161.5	258.8
8	(Sweden) Oskar Eriksson	119.4	257.4
9	(Manitoba) John Epping	136.0	230.9
10	(Alberta) Brendan Bottcher	119.9	218.2
11	(Italy) Stefano Spiller	117.4	213.1
12	(Italy) Joël Retornaz	135.3	200.2
13	(Saskatchewan) Tyler Tardi	102.9	194.3
14	(Japan) Tsuyoshi Yamaguchi	102.6	191.9
15	(Manitoba) Jordon McDonald	113.9	190.9

Women

After Week 15
#	Skip	YTD	OOM
1	(South Korea) Gim Eun-ji	188.5	349.4
2	(Switzerland) Alina Pätz	168.8	316.5
3	(Switzerland) Xenia Schwaller	143.5	314.8
4	(Sweden) Isabella Wranå	185.3	309.8
5	(Manitoba) Kerri Einarson	132.3	302.2
6	(Ontario) Rachel Homan	33.8	283.5
7	(Japan) Miku Nihira	166.3	283.0
8	(Sweden) Anna Hasselborg	71.5	248.6
9	(Japan) Miyu Ueno	173.3	245.0
10	(Japan) Ikue Kitazawa	143.7	238.4
11	(South Korea) Kim Kyeong-ae	140.4	237.4
12	(Alberta) Selena Sturmay	172.2	237.2
13	(South Korea) Park You-been	126.6	230.8
14	(Japan) Satsuki Fujisawa	81.1	214.6
15	(Japan) Mina Kobayashi	83.4	199.8

Mixed Doubles

After Week 15
#	Team	YTD	OOM
1	(Sweden) Westman / Ahlberg	82.4	190.1
2	(Japan) Koana / Aoki	90.0	190.0
3	(United States) Thiesse / Dropkin	45.8	173.0
4	(Norway) Skaslien / Nedregotten	57.1	169.1
5	(Australia) Wytrychowski / Hewitt	60.1	137.3
6	(Ontario) Ford / Campbell	40.5	130.7
7	(Norway) Kjærland / Brænden	72.2	126.6
8	(Switzerland) Perret / Rios	35.5	106.5
9	(Ontario) Neil / McDonald	35.5	103.2
10	(Alberta) (Ontario) Gray-Withers / Pietrangelo	17.1	100.7
11	(Scotland) Dodds / Carson	59.5	99.1
12	(New Brunswick) Adams / Robichaud	39.9	90.9
13	(Japan) Matsumura / Tanida	29.5	89.4
14	(Ontario) Weeks / Steep	34.4	87.5
15	(Ontario) Craig / Craig	34.7	85.0

== Notable team changes ==
=== Team line-up changes pre-season ===
Teams listed by skip

- Skylar Ackerman: Ackerman, who won the 2024 Saskatchewan Scotties Tournament of Hearts and skipped Saskatchewan at the 2024 Scotties Tournament of Hearts, returned after taking a break to focus on her education and skipping a new team alongside Robyn Silvernagle, Rachel Big Eagle, and Mary Little.
- Félix Asselin: After the rest of the 2026 Quebec Tankard winning team of Jean-Michel Ménard announced their retirement last season, Asselin returned to skipping with a new lineup alongside Julien Tremblay, Jesse Mullen, and Jean-Michel Arsenault.
- (Prince Edward Island) Suzanne Birt: The 13-time PEI Women's Curling Champion Birt has returned after taking a multi-year break from competitive curling, skipping a new team alongside Michelle Shea, Meaghan Hughes, and Sinead Dolan.
- (Nova Scotia) Christina Black: Team Black, who won the silver medal at the 2025 Canadian Olympic Curling Trials last season, announced that they would be again forming a five-person roster alongside Black, Jill Brothers, Marlee Powers, and Karlee Everist by adding Lindsey Burgess to the lineup after the retirement of Jenn Baxter.
- Brendan Bottcher: Following Brad Gushue's retirement, Bottcher and Geoff Walker are sticking together and forming a new team in Alberta after their tenure on Team Gushue in Newfoundland and Labrador, and have added the Horgan brothers, Jacob and Tanner who were formerly with Team Epping.
- Kira Brunton: After the dissolution of Team Danielle Inglis last season in Ontario, longtime third Brunton announced that she would be skipping a new team out of Northern Ontario alongside Kendra Lilly, Jamie Smith, and Lauren Rajala.
- / Cameron Bryce: After Team Bryce announced Duncan Menzies is stepping back from competitive curling, Scotland's Bryce, alongside Scott Hyslop and Robin McCall, decided to form a five person team alongside Alberta-based Karsten Sturmay and Kerr Drummond as they become an international Canada-Scotland team. This new "fivesome of curlers" from across the globe, are aiming to become perhaps curling’s first-ever “mercenary” team where they would not compete in national or world championships, but instead plan to play in World Curling Tour and Grand Slam of Curling events to climb the World Curling Tour rankings, and earn as much money as possible.
- Kate Cameron: Manitoba-based skip Cameron announced that she will skip a new lineup out of Quebec this season, alongside Laurie St-Georges, Emily Riley, and Émilia Gagné.
- (Italy) Stefania Constantini: After her former Italian national women's team split, Constantini has set a new roster for next season that she will be skipping with Lucrezia Grande, Angela Romei, and Allegra Grande.
- Jim Cotter: Cotter, who took a break from competitive curling, announced his return where he will skip his team out of British Columbia, alongside Jared Kolomaya, Connor Deane, Erik Colwell, Brad Wood.
- (British Columbia) Sarah Daniels: Previously with Quebec's Team Laurie St-Georges, Daniels has returned to skipping out of her home province of BC, with Abby Ackland, Calissa Daly, Dayna Demmans making up the rest of her new team.
- Matt Dunstone: Following the retirement of E.J. Harnden, Team Dunstone announced 6-time Brier champ and Newfoundland and Labrador curler Mark Nichols would be joining their Manitoba rink at second. Third Colton Lott and lead Ryan Harnden remained in their positions.
- (Manitoba) Kerri Einarson: Days after earning silver at the 2026 World Women's Curling Championship, Team Einarson parted ways with former third Val Sweeting, alternate Krysten Karwacki and coach Reid Carruthers. Einarson would later announce in the pre-season that they have added Jocelyn Peterman, who represented Canada in mixed doubles at the 2026 Winter Olympics, who will throw lead and handle vice skip duties.
- John Epping: Following the disbandment of Team Epping the previous season, Epping announced that he would be skipping a new team out of Manitoba, alongside B. J. Neufeld, Ryan Wiebe, and Ian McMillan.
- (Sweden) Oskar Eriksson: Following the retirement of former skip Niklas Edin, the rest of the team announced that they would be staying together, with former alternate Simon Olofsson joining full-time as second. Eriksson will skip, with Rasmus Wranå throwing third stones, and Christoffer Sundgren remaining in the lead position.
- Satsuki Fujisawa: Yako Matsuzawa, who served as Team Fujisawa's alternate during the 2026 Japan Curling Championships, is sticking around full-time as the new third for the rest of the season after the championship alongside Fujisawa, Yumi Suzuki, and Yurika Yoshida.
- (New Brunswick) James Grattan: After third Joel Krats left to form his own team in Newfoundland, Grattan announced that Jonathan Beuk would be returning to the team as third, with Andy McCann and Noah Riggs remaining in second and lead positions respectively.
- (Alberta) Serena Gray-Withers: After taking a break to focus on mixed doubles, Laura Walker announced her return to women's curling as second on the Gray-Withers rink after the team parted ways with former second Lindsey Burgess. Catherine Clifford and Zoe Cinnamon remained as third and lead respectively.
- (South Korea) Ha Seung-youn: After parting ways last season, Ha announced that she would be skipping a new team alongside Kim Hye-rin, Kim Cho-hi, and Kim Seon-yeong.
- (Scotland) Grant Hardie: Hardie, after a nine-year run as third on Team Mouat that’ll stand as "one of the best in curling history" — two Olympic silver medals (2022, 2026), two World Curling Championships (2023, 2025), four European Curling Championships (2018, 2021, 2022, and 2023), with 12 Grand Slam of Curling titles and several years ranked as the No. 1 team in the world, announced that he would be leaving Team Mouat to skip the former Team Whyte, with Ross Whyte now throwing fourth stones. Craig Waddell and Euan Kyle remained in their lead and second positions respectively.
- (Scotland) Fay Henderson: After former teammate Hailey Duff stepped back from competitive curling, the team added Sophie Sinclair as a fifth player alongside Lisa Davie, Laura Watt, and Katie McMillan.
- (Ontario) Scott Howard: Howard, after parting ways with Mat and Jason Camm, has added David Mathers and Pat Janssen to the team as third and second, with Scott Chadwick continuing to play lead.
- (Ontario) Danielle Inglis: After the dissolution of her previous team, Inglis announced a new lineup with Jo-Ann Rizzo, Geri-Lynn Ramsay and Joanne Tarvit.
- (South Korea) Kang Bo-bae: With Team Kim all going their separate ways, third Kim Kyeong-ae joined up with two-time world junior champions Team Kang. She initially slotted in at third, but later skipped the team for the season after Kang won the Korean Mixed Doubles Curling Championship.
- (Germany) Benjamin Kapp: Following Marc Muskatewitz's announcement that he would be stepping back from the German national team and instead focus on the Rock League, the whole team moved up one position with Kapp skipping the team, Felix Messenzehl and Johannes Scheuerl moving to third and second respectively, and former alternate Mario Trevisiol now as lead.
- Mark Kean: Former Ontario Tankard champ Kean announced that he would be forming a new team based out of Nova Scotia, alongside Ryan Abraham, Nathan Gray, and Luke Saunders.
- (South Korea) Kim Eun-jung: After her former Olympic and world silver medal winning team went their separate ways, Kim Eun-jung returned to her hometown of Uiseong to skip the young team of Park Han-byul, Bang Yu-jin, Kim Hae-jeong and Kim Su-hyeon.
- (South Korea) Kim Ji-yoon: With Park You-been moving on to Chuncheon, Kim Ji-yoon took over as skip of Seoul City Hall with Lee Hae-in joining as the new second. Lee Eun-chae and Yang Seung-hee continued at third and lead respectively.
- (Czech Republic) Lukáš Klíma: Following the departure of third Marek Černovský, Team Klíma added 2026 Olympic mixed doubles representative Vít Chabičovský to the team.
- (Japan) Mina Kobayashi: Former alternate Mina Kobayashi moved up to skip following the retirement of Sayaka Yoshimura. Kaho Onodera, Yuna Kotani and Anna Ohmiya all retained their positions.
- (Alberta) Kevin Koe: Following the departure of third Tyler Tardi, Koe would announce that 2023 Canadian Junior Curling Champion skip Johnson Tao would be joining the team as their new third. Aaron Sluchinski and Karrick Martin would remain as second and lead respectively.
- Grace Lloyd: After parting ways with former skip Hailey Armstrong, Lloyd moved up to skip the 2026 Ontario women's championship rink with Evelyn Robert joining at third.
- (British Columbia) Kayla MacMillan: MacMillan would announce that Val Sweeting, a 4-time Scotties Tournament of Hearts champion who played for 8 seasons as third with Manitoba's Kerri Einarson before leaving the team, would be joining the team as their new third/skip in BC. Lindsay Dubue and Lauren Lenentine will continue to be the front-end.
- Mike McEwen: McEwen would announce that after his previous team disbanded, he would be staying in Saskatchewan and skipping a new team alongside Rylan Kleiter, Joshua Mattern, and Trevor Johnson.
- Sam Mooibroek: After the announcement that 2025 Ontario Tankard champions Team Mooibroek would be disbanded, Mooibroek would form a new team in Ontario alongside previous 2025 Nova Scotia Men's Champion skip Owen Purcell as third, with Scott Mitchell and Gavin Lydiate as second and lead respectively.
- (Scotland) Bruce Mouat: After the departure of longtime third Grant Hardie to skip his new team, Team Mouat announced that Robin Brydone, who was a 2026 World Men's Bronze Medalist on the previous Team Whyte, would be joining the team as their new third. Bobby Lammie and Hammy McMillan Jr. remaining in their second and lead positions respectively.
- (Manitoba) Selena Njegovan: Njegovan who won a silver medal at the 2026 Scotties Tournament of Hearts last season, announced that after the retirement of teammate Kaitlyn Lawes, she would be leaving to form a new Winnipeg-based team with Erin Pincott, Margot Flemming, and Krysten Karwacki.
- (United States) Anne O'Hara: As part of the USA Curling team announcement, O'Hara, formerly the third for Delaney Strouse, formed a new squad with Anya Normandeau, Sydney Mullaney and Ella Fleming.
- (South Korea) Park You-been: The former skip of Seoul City Hall joined Chuncheon City Hall following the departure of Ha Seung-youn and Kim Hye-rin to Gangneung. Alternate Park Seo-jin moved up to third while Yang Tae-i and Kim Su-jin continued on the front-end.
- (Switzerland) Alina Pätz: Following the retirement of longtime skip Silvana Tirinzoni, and second Carole Howald stepping back from competitive play, Pätz and Selina Witschonke formed a new team with longtime alternate Stefanie Berset and Renée Frigo at the front-end.
- (Norway) Magnus Ramsfjell: Magnus and Bendik Ramsfjell announced the addition of Steffen Walstad and Mathias Brænden to their squad after former teammates Martin Sesaker and Gaute Nepstad stepped back from competitive curling. Walstad joined at the third position, with Brænden slotting in at lead and Magnus and Bendik remaining at skip and second.
- (Italy) Joël Retornaz: With the previous Italian men's national team skipped by Joël Retornaz now splintering off, Retornaz announced that he would be skipping an all-new lineup for next season alongside 2025 World Junior Champions Stefano and Andrea Gilli as third and second respectively, with longtime former alternate on Team Retornaz Alberto Pimpini as their lead.
- (Ontario) Krista Scharf: After having previously announced her retirement, Scharf announced she was joining Team Robyn Despins as their skip.
- (Switzerland) Kim Schwaller: Schwaller, who won the bronze medal at the 2026 Winter Olympics as the alternate of the Swiss team skipped by older brother Yannick Schwaller, announced that he would be forming his own team this year alongside Max Winz, Andreas Gerlach, and Jan Iseli.
- John Shuster: Through an announcement with USA Curling, Shuster – the 2018 Winter Olympics champion skip would be starting a new line-up this season, alongside the self-described "Young Bucks" of Andrew Stopera, Mark Fenner, and Lance Wheeler who are three-time United States Junior Champions, silver medalists at the 2017 World Junior Championships, and most recently won the 2025 United States Men's Curling Championship.
- Kayla Skrlik: With the former Team Skrlik breaking up, Skrlik announced that she would be forming a new team in Alberta alongside two-time Canadian junior champion skip Myla Plett as third, with Sarah Koltun and Samantha Fisher as the front-end.
- (Italy) Stefano Spiller: After the dissolution of Team Retornaz, former third and second Amos Mosaner and Sebastiano Arman announced that they would be joining the Spiller brothers; Stefano and Cesare Spiller, with 2025 World Junior Champion skip Stefano skipping the new team.
- Taylour Stevens: Team Stevens, the reigning 2026 Nova Scotia Women's Curling Champions who also finished 5th at the 2026 Scotties Tournament of Hearts, announced that Rebecca Regan would be filling in on the team this season as their new second alongside Stevens and the Fitzgerald sisters (Maria and Cate), while Alison Umlah recovers from a shoulder injury.
- Tyler Tardi: Tardi, who won an Olympic gold medal as the alternate of the Canadian men's curling team at 2026 Winter Olympics, announced that he would be skipping Mike McEwen's old teammates of Colton Flasch, Kevin Marsh, and Dan Marsh out of Saskatchewan this season.
- (Sweden) Isabella Wranå: Team Wranå announced that former alternate Moa Dryburgh would now be their new second this season, with Maria Larsson moving to lead and Linda Stenlund being shifted to a fifth/alternate role. Wranå and Almida de Val remained in their positions.
- Nathan Young: After winning the 2026 Newfoundland and Labrador Tankard, Young announced that he would be heading to Ontario to skip a new team alongside Brady Lumley, Matthew Garner, and Spencer Dunlop.
- (Italy) Giulia Zardini Lacedelli: After the dissolution of the Italian women's national team and former skip Stefania Constantini forming a new rink, the rest of the team announced that they would be staying together with Zardini Lacedelli now being the skip, and joined alongside Elena Mathis, Marta Lo Deserto, and Rachele Scalesse.

Preceded by 2025–26	2026–27 curling season May 2026 – May 2027	Succeeded by 2027–28
