= 2026 Mixed Doubles Gstaad =

- Host city: Gstaad, Switzerland
- Arena: Curling Club Gstaad
- Dates: October 27–29
- Winner: (Japan) Koana / Aoki
- Female: Tori Koana
- Male: Go Aoki
- Finalist: (Australia) Wytrychowski / Hewitt

The 2026 Mixed Doubles Gstaad was held from October 27 to 29 at Curling Club Gstaad in Gstaad, Switzerland. The event was held in a round robin format with a purse of 10,800 CHF. It was held as a partner event of the 2026 Mixed Doubles Bern which was played October 23 to 25.

In the final, Japan's Tori Koana and Go Aoki bettered their runner-up finish in Bern by defeating Australia's Jessica Wytrychowski and Dean Hewitt 8–3. It was a strong week for the Japanese pair as they finished 4–1 in the round robin to qualify for the playoffs. They then eliminated countrymates Chiaki Matsumura and Yasumasa Tanida 10–2 in the quarterfinals before taking down Norway's Kristin Skaslien and Magnus Nedregotten in the semifinals. Wytrychowski and Hewitt, meanwhile, needed a tiebreaker to advance to the playoffs after a 3–2 round robin record. They bounced Germany's Vera Tiuliakova and Sixten Totzek before upsetting Bern champions Sweden's Therese Westman and Robin Ahlberg in the quarterfinals and Scotland's Jennifer Dodds and Orrin Carson in the semifinals. The playoff field was rounded out by Estonia's Karoliine Kaare and Harri Lill and the Swiss/Canadian pair of Carole Howald and Kirk Muyres.

== Teams ==
The teams are listed as follows:

Female	Male	Locale
Jennifer Dodds	Orrin Carson	Stirling, Scotland
Katie Ford	Oliver Campbell	(Canada) Waterloo, Ontario
Nadja Grunder	Peter Hartmann	Geneva, Switzerland
Carole Howald	Kirk Muyres	Langenthal, Switzerland / (Canada) Wadena, Saskatchewan
Lea Hüppi	Jonas Weiss	Dübendorf, Switzerland
Michèle Jäggi	Romano Keller-Meier	Baden, Switzerland
Linda Joó	Cameron Bryce	Budapest, Hungary / Kelso, Scotland
Karoliine Kaare	Harri Lill	Tallinn, Estonia
Tori Koana	Go Aoki	Yamanashi, Japan
Chiaki Matsumura	Yasumasa Tanida	Nagano / Sapporo, Japan
Giorgia Maurino	Simone Gonin	Trentino, Italy
Anika Meier	Felix Lüthold	Lucerne, Switzerland
Jenny Perret	Kevin Wunderlin	Glarus, Switzerland
Kristin Skaslien	Magnus Nedregotten	Oslo, Norway
Vera Tiuliakova	Sixten Totzek	Füssen, Germany
Dorottya Udvardi-Palancsa	Lőrinc Tatár	Budapest, Hungary
Therese Westman	Robin Ahlberg	Sundbyberg, Sweden
Jessica Wytrychowski	Dean Hewitt	Brisbane, Australia

== Round robin standings ==
Final Round Robin Standings

Key
Teams to Playoffs
Teams to Tiebreakers

Pool A	W	L	W–L	PF	PA	DSC
(Japan) Koana / Aoki	4	1	1–0	32	24	17.81
(Estonia) Kaare / Lill	4	1	0–1	34	31	19.48
(Switzerland) (Canada) Howald / Muyres	3	2	1–0	30	30	27.84
(Germany) Tiuliakova / Totzek	3	2	0–1	37	26	62.78
(Canada) Ford / Campbell	1	4	–	25	31	20.83
(Switzerland) Grunder / Hartmann	0	5	–	25	41	58.83

Pool B	W	L	W–L	PF	PA	DSC
(Sweden) Westman / Ahlberg	4	1	1–0	48	24	7.68
(Scotland) Dodds / Carson	4	1	0–1	37	27	8.63
(Hungary) Udvardi-Palancsa / Tatár	3	2	–	36	30	30.48
(Italy) Maurino / Gonin	2	3	1–0	31	31	13.89
(Switzerland) Perret / Wunderlin	2	3	0–1	21	29	23.32
(Switzerland) Meier / Lüthold	0	5	–	11	43	45.51

Pool C	W	L	W–L	PF	PA	DSC
(Norway) Skaslien / Nedregotten	5	0	–	46	20	22.44
(Japan) Matsumura / Tanida	4	1	–	28	21	16.53
(Australia) Wytrychowski / Hewitt	3	2	–	40	25	7.40
(Switzerland) Jäggi / Keller-Meier	2	3	–	27	38	72.92
(Hungary) (Scotland) Joó / Bryce	1	4	–	32	38	53.91
(Switzerland) Hüppi / Weiss	0	5	–	16	47	56.02

== Round robin results ==
All draw times listed in Central European Time (UTC+01:00).

=== Draw 1 ===
Tuesday, October 27, 8:00 am

Sheet A	1	2	3	4	5	6	7	8	Final
(Germany) Tiuliakova / Totzek	1	0	5	1	0	2	0	X	9
(Switzerland) Grunder / Hartmann 🔨	0	1	0	0	2	0	2	X	5

Sheet B	1	2	3	4	5	6	7	8	Final
(Estonia) Kaare / Lill 🔨	3	0	0	1	0	2	0	1	7
(Canada) Ford / Campbell	0	2	1	0	2	0	1	0	6

Sheet C	1	2	3	4	5	6	7	8	Final
(Japan) Koana / Aoki 🔨	0	1	1	1	0	4	0	X	7
(Switzerland) (Canada) Howald / Muyres	1	0	0	0	2	0	1	X	4

Sheet D	1	2	3	4	5	6	7	8	Final
(Scotland) Dodds / Carson	0	0	1	1	2	0	3	0	7
(Sweden) Westman / Ahlberg 🔨	1	1	0	0	0	4	0	3	9

Sheet E	1	2	3	4	5	6	7	8	Final
(Switzerland) Perret / Wunderlin 🔨	1	2	0	0	1	0	0	2	6
(Hungary) Udvardi-Palancsa / Tatár	0	0	1	2	0	1	1	0	5

=== Draw 2 ===
Tuesday, October 27, 11:00 am

Sheet A	1	2	3	4	5	6	7	8	9	Final
(Estonia) Kaare / Lill	2	0	0	1	0	1	1	0	1	6
(Switzerland) (Canada) Howald / Muyres 🔨	0	1	1	0	1	0	0	2	0	5

Sheet B	1	2	3	4	5	6	7	8	Final
(Switzerland) Jäggi / Keller-Meier	2	2	0	2	0	2	0	1	9
(Hungary) (Scotland) Joó / Bryce 🔨	0	0	2	0	3	0	2	0	7

Sheet C	1	2	3	4	5	6	7	8	Final
(Switzerland) Hüppi / Weiss	0	0	2	0	X	X	X	X	2
(Australia) Wytrychowski / Hewitt 🔨	5	1	0	4	X	X	X	X	10

Sheet D	1	2	3	4	5	6	7	8	Final
(Norway) Skaslien / Nedregotten	2	0	2	1	0	1	1	X	7
(Japan) Matsumura / Tanida 🔨	0	1	0	0	1	0	0	X	2

Sheet E	1	2	3	4	5	6	7	8	Final
(Switzerland) Meier / Lüthold 🔨	1	0	0	1	2	0	0	X	4
(Italy) Maurino / Gonin	0	3	2	0	0	1	1	X	7

=== Draw 3 ===
Tuesday, October 27, 2:00 pm

Sheet A	1	2	3	4	5	6	7	8	9	Final
(Hungary) Udvardi-Palancsa / Tatár 🔨	1	0	0	1	1	1	1	0	1	6
(Italy) Maurino / Gonin	0	1	2	0	0	0	0	2	0	5

Sheet B	1	2	3	4	5	6	7	8	Final
(Switzerland) Meier / Lüthold	0	0	0	0	X	X	X	X	0
(Sweden) Westman / Ahlberg 🔨	2	2	2	2	X	X	X	X	8

Sheet C	1	2	3	4	5	6	7	8	Final
(Scotland) Dodds / Carson 🔨	1	0	1	1	0	2	0	X	5
(Switzerland) Perret / Wunderlin	0	1	0	0	1	0	1	X	3

Sheet D	1	2	3	4	5	6	7	8	Final
(Japan) Koana / Aoki	0	0	1	0	0	X	X	X	1
(Germany) Tiuliakova / Totzek 🔨	3	1	0	1	1	X	X	X	6

Sheet E	1	2	3	4	5	6	7	8	Final
(Switzerland) Grunder / Hartmann	0	0	0	1	1	0	X	X	2
(Canada) Ford / Campbell 🔨	2	2	2	0	0	2	X	X	8

=== Draw 4 ===
Tuesday, October 27, 5:00 pm

Sheet A	1	2	3	4	5	6	7	8	Final
(Hungary) (Scotland) Joó / Bryce	0	2	1	0	0	1	0	X	4
(Australia) Wytrychowski / Hewitt 🔨	1	0	0	4	1	0	2	X	8

Sheet B	1	2	3	4	5	6	7	8	Final
(Switzerland) Hüppi / Weiss	0	1	0	0	0	X	X	X	1
(Japan) Matsumura / Tanida 🔨	1	0	3	2	2	X	X	X	8

Sheet C	1	2	3	4	5	6	7	8	Final
(Norway) Skaslien / Nedregotten 🔨	2	1	0	3	0	4	X	X	10
(Switzerland) Jäggi / Keller-Meier	0	0	1	0	1	0	X	X	2

Sheet D	1	2	3	4	5	6	7	8	Final
(Estonia) Kaare / Lill 🔨	0	3	1	2	0	0	3	X	9
(Switzerland) Grunder / Hartmann	1	0	0	0	3	1	0	X	5

Sheet E	1	2	3	4	5	6	7	8	Final
(Germany) Tiuliakova / Totzek	0	1	1	1	1	0	3	0	7
(Switzerland) (Canada) Howald / Muyres 🔨	3	0	0	0	0	3	0	2	8

=== Draw 5 ===
Tuesday, October 27, 8:00 pm

Sheet A	1	2	3	4	5	6	7	8	Final
(Canada) Ford / Campbell 🔨	2	0	1	0	0	1	0	X	4
(Japan) Koana / Aoki	0	0	0	3	2	0	4	X	9

Sheet B	1	2	3	4	5	6	7	8	Final
(Italy) Maurino / Gonin	0	0	2	0	4	1	0	1	8
(Scotland) Dodds / Carson 🔨	1	1	0	1	0	0	5	0	9

Sheet C	1	2	3	4	5	6	7	8	Final
(Switzerland) Perret / Wunderlin	0	0	1	1	0	2	0	X	4
(Sweden) Westman / Ahlberg 🔨	2	2	0	0	3	0	3	X	10

Sheet D	1	2	3	4	5	6	7	8	Final
(Switzerland) Meier / Lüthold	2	0	0	1	0	X	X	X	3
(Hungary) Udvardi-Palancsa / Tatár 🔨	0	4	2	0	5	X	X	X	11

Sheet E	1	2	3	4	5	6	7	8	9	Final
(Australia) Wytrychowski / Hewitt 🔨	0	3	0	1	0	4	0	0	0	8
(Norway) Skaslien / Nedregotten	2	0	1	0	2	0	2	1	1	9

=== Draw 6 ===
Wednesday, October 28, 8:00 am

Sheet A	1	2	3	4	5	6	7	8	9	Final
(Switzerland) Jäggi / Keller-Meier	0	1	0	1	2	0	0	1	0	5
(Japan) Matsumura / Tanida 🔨	1	0	2	0	0	1	1	0	1	6

Sheet B	1	2	3	4	5	6	7	8	9	Final
(Switzerland) Grunder / Hartmann	0	3	0	2	0	0	2	0	0	7
(Japan) Koana / Aoki 🔨	1	0	3	0	1	1	0	1	1	8

Sheet C	1	2	3	4	5	6	7	8	Final
(Germany) Tiuliakova / Totzek	0	1	2	0	2	0	3	0	8
(Estonia) Kaare / Lill 🔨	1	0	0	3	0	1	0	4	9

Sheet D	1	2	3	4	5	6	7	8	Final
(Switzerland) (Canada) Howald / Muyres	1	0	2	1	0	0	2	0	6
(Canada) Ford / Campbell 🔨	0	1	0	0	1	1	0	1	4

Sheet E	1	2	3	4	5	6	7	8	Final
(Switzerland) Hüppi / Weiss	0	1	0	3	1	0	X	X	5
(Hungary) (Scotland) Joó / Bryce 🔨	2	0	6	0	0	4	X	X	12

=== Draw 7 ===
Wednesday, October 28, 11:00 am

Sheet A	1	2	3	4	5	6	7	8	Final
(Italy) Maurino / Gonin 🔨	1	2	1	3	1	X	X	X	8
(Switzerland) Perret / Wunderlin	0	0	0	0	0	X	X	X	0

Sheet B	1	2	3	4	5	6	7	8	Final
(Japan) Matsumura / Tanida	0	1	0	1	1	0	3	X	6
(Australia) Wytrychowski / Hewitt 🔨	1	0	2	0	0	2	0	X	5

Sheet C	1	2	3	4	5	6	7	8	Final
(Sweden) Westman / Ahlberg 🔨	3	0	3	0	1	0	2	0	9
(Hungary) Udvardi-Palancsa / Tatár	0	1	0	3	0	3	0	3	10

Sheet D	1	2	3	4	5	6	7	8	Final
(Hungary) (Scotland) Joó / Bryce	2	2	0	1	0	1	0	0	6
(Norway) Skaslien / Nedregotten 🔨	0	0	4	0	1	0	4	1	10

Sheet E	1	2	3	4	5	6	7	8	Final
(Scotland) Dodds / Carson 🔨	4	3	1	0	1	X	X	X	9
(Switzerland) Meier / Lüthold	0	0	0	3	0	X	X	X	3

=== Draw 8 ===
Wednesday, October 28, 2:00 pm

Sheet A	1	2	3	4	5	6	7	8	Final
(Japan) Koana / Aoki 🔨	1	0	1	0	4	0	1	X	7
(Estonia) Kaare / Lill	0	1	0	1	0	1	0	X	3

Sheet B	1	2	3	4	5	6	7	8	Final
(Switzerland) Perret / Wunderlin	1	2	0	3	1	1	X	X	8
(Switzerland) Meier / Lüthold 🔨	0	0	1	0	0	0	X	X	1

Sheet C	1	2	3	4	5	6	7	8	Final
(Canada) Ford / Campbell 🔨	2	0	1	0	0	0	X	X	3
(Germany) Tiuliakova / Totzek	0	2	0	1	2	2	X	X	7

Sheet D	1	2	3	4	5	6	7	8	9	Final
(Switzerland) Jäggi / Keller-Meier	0	2	1	2	0	0	1	0	1	7
(Switzerland) Hüppi / Weiss 🔨	1	0	0	0	1	1	0	3	0	6

Sheet E	1	2	3	4	5	6	7	8	9	Final
(Switzerland) (Canada) Howald / Muyres	0	3	1	0	1	1	0	0	1	7
(Switzerland) Grunder / Hartmann 🔨	3	0	0	1	0	0	1	1	0	6

=== Draw 9 ===
Wednesday, October 28, 5:00 pm

Sheet A	1	2	3	4	5	6	7	8	Final
(Norway) Skaslien / Nedregotten 🔨	5	1	0	4	X	X	X	X	10
(Switzerland) Hüppi / Weiss	0	0	2	0	X	X	X	X	2

Sheet B	1	2	3	4	5	6	7	8	Final
(Australia) Wytrychowski / Hewitt	0	1	2	0	4	2	0	X	9
(Switzerland) Jäggi / Keller-Meier 🔨	2	0	0	1	0	0	1	X	4

Sheet C	1	2	3	4	5	6	7	8	Final
(Japan) Matsumura / Tanida	0	2	1	1	0	2	0	X	6
(Hungary) (Scotland) Joó / Bryce 🔨	1	0	0	0	1	0	1	X	3

Sheet D	1	2	3	4	5	6	7	8	Final
(Sweden) Westman / Ahlberg 🔨	1	1	0	5	0	5	X	X	12
(Italy) Maurino / Gonin	0	0	1	0	2	0	X	X	3

Sheet E	1	2	3	4	5	6	7	8	Final
(Hungary) Udvardi-Palancsa / Tatár	0	0	1	0	1	2	0	X	4
(Scotland) Dodds / Carson 🔨	1	1	0	2	0	0	3	X	7

== Tiebreakers ==
Wednesday, October 28, 9:00 pm

Sheet C	1	2	3	4	5	6	7	8	Final
(Switzerland) (Canada) Howald / Muyres 🔨	3	0	1	0	2	2	1	X	9
(Hungary) Udvardi-Palancsa / Tatár	0	4	0	1	0	0	0	X	5

Sheet D	1	2	3	4	5	6	7	8	Final
(Australia) Wytrychowski / Hewitt 🔨	0	0	1	1	0	3	0	1	6
(Germany) Tiuliakova / Totzek	1	1	0	0	1	0	1	0	4

== Playoffs ==
Quarterfinals
1	(Norway) Skaslien / Nedregotten	8
8	(Switzerland) (Canada) Howald / Muyres	5
4	(Japan) Matsumura / Tanida	2
5	(Japan) Koana / Aoki	10
2	(Sweden) Westman / Ahlberg	3
7	(Australia) Wytrychowski / Hewitt	10
3	(Scotland) Dodds / Carson	8
6	(Estonia) Kaare / Lill	4

Semifinals
1	(Norway) Skaslien / Nedregotten	4
5	(Japan) Koana / Aoki	6
7	(Australia) Wytrychowski / Hewitt	7
3	(Scotland) Dodds / Carson	2

Final
5	(Japan) Koana / Aoki	8
7	(Australia) Wytrychowski / Hewitt	3

=== Quarterfinals ===
Thursday, October 29, 8:00 am

Sheet A	1	2	3	4	5	6	7	8	Final
(Japan) Matsumura / Tanida 🔨	0	1	0	0	1	0	0	X	2
(Japan) Koana / Aoki	2	0	1	2	0	2	3	X	10

Sheet B	1	2	3	4	5	6	7	8	Final
(Scotland) Dodds / Carson	0	1	0	4	0	0	3	X	8
(Estonia) Kaare / Lill 🔨	1	0	1	0	1	1	0	X	4

Sheet C	1	2	3	4	5	6	7	8	Final
(Sweden) Westman / Ahlberg 🔨	0	0	1	0	2	0	X	X	3
(Australia) Wytrychowski / Hewitt	1	3	0	4	0	2	X	X	10

Sheet E	1	2	3	4	5	6	7	8	Final
(Norway) Skaslien / Nedregotten 🔨	0	2	0	2	2	0	0	2	8
(Switzerland) (Canada) Howald / Muyres	1	0	1	0	0	2	1	0	5

=== Semifinals ===
Thursday, October 29, 11:00 am

Sheet B	1	2	3	4	5	6	7	8	Final
(Australia) Wytrychowski / Hewitt	1	0	4	2	X	X	X	X	7
(Scotland) Dodds / Carson 🔨	0	2	0	0	X	X	X	X	2

Sheet D	1	2	3	4	5	6	7	8	Final
(Norway) Skaslien / Nedregotten 🔨	1	0	1	1	0	1	0	0	4
(Japan) Koana / Aoki	0	2	0	0	2	0	1	1	6

=== Final ===
Thursday, October 29, 2:30 pm

Sheet C	1	2	3	4	5	6	7	8	Final
(Japan) Koana / Aoki 🔨	3	0	2	0	0	1	2	X	8
(Australia) Wytrychowski / Hewitt	0	1	0	1	1	0	0	X	3
