= Mixed Doubles Gstaad =

Annual curling tournament in Gstaad, Switzerland

- Established: 2023
- Host city: Gstaad, Switzerland
- Arena: Curling Club Gstaad
- Purse: CHF 10,800
- 2026 champion: (Japan) Koana / Aoki

Current edition
- 2026 Mixed Doubles Gstaad

The Mixed Doubles Gstaad is an annual mixed doubles curling tournament established in 2023. It is held annually in the fall at the Curling Club Gstaad in Gstaad, Switzerland.

The event was originally created as a replacement for the Mixed Doubles Bern event which was not held in 2023. In 2024, it was held as a partner event with the Mixed Doubles Bern, ending two days before the other began.

The inaugural event was won by two-time Swiss Olympians Jenny Perret and Martin Rios who defeated Sweden's Therese Westman and Robin Ahlberg 9–8 in an extra end final. It was the Swiss pairs' sole tour title of the year. Pia-Lisa Schöll and Leonhard Angrick won the consolation cup.

The 2024 event was won by 2021 world champions Jennifer Dodds and Bruce Mouat who won 8–7 over two-time Olympic medalists Kristin Skaslien and Magnus Nedregotten of Norway. Dodds and Mouat led a strong five team Scottish contingent with four of the five teams qualifying for the playoff round.

== Past champions ==
Year	Winning pair	Runner up pair	Purse (CHF)
2023	(Switzerland) Jenny Perret / Martin Rios	(Sweden) Therese Westman / Robin Ahlberg	7,000
2024	(Scotland) Jennifer Dodds / Bruce Mouat	(Norway) Kristin Skaslien / Magnus Nedregotten	8,000
2025	(Australia) Tahli Gill / Dean Hewitt	(Norway) Kristin Skaslien / Magnus Nedregotten	9,000
2026	(Japan) Tori Koana / Go Aoki	(Australia) Jessica Wytrychowski / Dean Hewitt	10,800
