= 2017 Paf Masters Tour =

World Curling Tour event

- Host city: Eckerö, Åland
- Arena: Vianor Curling Center
- Dates: October 12–15
- Winner: (South Korea) Team Kim
- Curling club: Uiseong CC, Uiseong, South Korea
- Skip: Kim Eun-jung
- Third: Kim Kyeong-ae
- Second: Kim Seon-yeong
- Lead: Kim Yeong-mi
- Alternate: Kim Cho-hi
- Finalist: (Canada) Shannon Kleibrink

The 2017 Paf Masters Tour was held October 12 to 15, 2017 at the Vianor Curling Center in Eckerö, Åland, Finland as a part of the 2017–18 curling season. The event was held in a round robin format with eight teams advancing to the playoffs. The purse for the event was € 18,600.

In the final, Team Kim Eun-jung of South Korea capped off a perfect 6–0 tournament by defeating the previously undefeated Shannon Kleibrink rink from Canada 7–5 in the final. In the third place game, Therese Westman of Sweden topped Ayumi Ogasawara of Japan 6–3. To reach the final, Kim defeated Ogasawara 5–4 in one semifinal and Kleibrink beat Westman 5–3 in the other.

== Teams ==
The teams are listed as follows:

Skip	Third	Second	Lead	Alternate	Locale
Satsuki Fujisawa	Chinami Yoshida	Yumi Suzuki	Yurika Yoshida	Mari Motohashi	Kitami, Japan
Diana Gaspari	Veronica Zappone	Stefania Constantini	Arianna Losano		Cortina d'Ampezzo, Italy
Marina Hauser (Fourth)	Jessica Jäggi	Cynthia Gertsch (Skip)	Lara Moser		Dübendorf, Switzerland
Ursi Hegner	Imogen Oona Lehmann	Nina Ledergerber	Claudia Baumann		Uzwil, Switzerland
Oona Kauste	Eszter Juhász	Maija Salmiovirta	Jenni Räsänen	Lotta Immonen	Hyvinkää, Finland
Kim Eun-jung	Kim Kyeong-ae	Kim Seon-yeong	Kim Yeong-mi	Kim Cho-hi	Uiseong, South Korea
Shannon Kleibrink	Sarah Wilkes	Kalynn Park	Alison Thiessen		Calgary, Alberta, Canada
Chiaki Matsumura	Ikue Kitazawa	Emi Shimizu	Hasumi Ishigooka	Seina Nakajima	Karuizawa, Japan
Ayumi Ogasawara	Sayaka Yoshimura	Kaho Onodera	Anna Ohmiya	Yumie Funayama	Sapporo, Japan
Virginija Paulauskaitė	Lina Januleviciute	Asta Vaicekonyte	Olga Dvojeglazova	Grazina Eitutiene	Vilnius, Lithuania
Ieva Rudzīte	Liga Avena	Daina Barone	Rasa Bruna	Moa Norell	Riga, Latvia
Therese Westman	Johanna Heldin	Tilde Vermelin	Sarah Pengel	Anette Norberg	Stocksund, Sweden

== Round-robin standings ==
Final round-robin standings

Key
Teams to Playoffs

Pool A	W	L
(South Korea) Kim Eun-jung	3	0
(Sweden) Therese Westman	1	2
(Switzerland) Cynthia Gertsch	1	2
(Switzerland) Ursi Hegner	1	2

Pool B	W	L
(Japan) Satsuki Fujisawa	2	1
(Japan) Chiaki Matsumura	2	1
(Italy) Diana Gaspari	2	1
(Lithuania) Virginija Paulauskaitė	0	3

Pool C	W	L
(Canada) Shannon Kleibrink	3	0
(Finland) Oona Kauste	1	2
(Japan) Ayumi Ogasawara	1	2
(Latvia) Ieva Rudzīte	1	2

== Round-robin results ==
All draw times are listed in Eastern European Time (UTC+02:00).

=== Draw 1 ===
Thursday, October 12, 1:00 pm

Sheet 1	1	2	3	4	5	6	7	8	Final
(Switzerland) Ursi Hegner	0	2	0	1	2	0	2	1	8
(Sweden) Therese Westman	3	0	2	0	0	1	0	0	6

Sheet 2	1	2	3	4	5	6	7	8	Final
(South Korea) Team Kim	2	1	1	5	5	0	X	X	14
(Switzerland) Team Gertsch	0	0	0	0	0	1	X	X	1

=== Draw 2 ===
Thursday, October 12, 4:30 pm

Sheet 1	1	2	3	4	5	6	7	8	Final
(Lithuania) Virginija Paulauskaitė	0	1	0	1	0	1	0	X	3
(Japan) Satsuki Fujisawa	2	0	2	0	3	0	1	X	8

Sheet 2	1	2	3	4	5	6	7	8	Final
(Japan) Chiaki Matsumura	0	2	0	0	0	4	0	1	7
(Italy) Diana Gaspari	0	0	0	2	1	0	2	0	5

=== Draw 3 ===
Thursday, October 12, 8:00 pm

Sheet 1	1	2	3	4	5	6	7	8	Final
(Latvia) Ieva Rudzīte	0	0	1	0	0	0	0	X	1
(Canada) Shannon Kleibrink	3	1	0	1	0	1	2	X	8

Sheet 2	1	2	3	4	5	6	7	8	9	Final
(Finland) Oona Kauste	0	1	1	0	0	0	2	0	1	5
(Japan) Ayumi Ogasawara	0	0	0	1	1	1	0	1	0	4

=== Draw 4 ===
Friday, October 13, 8:00 am

Sheet 1	1	2	3	4	5	6	7	8	Final
(Sweden) Therese Westman	1	3	1	0	2	1	X	X	8
(Switzerland) Cynthia Gertsch	0	0	0	2	0	0	X	X	2

Sheet 2	1	2	3	4	5	6	7	8	Final
(Switzerland) Ursi Hegner	0	0	0	1	0	1	0	X	2
(South Korea) Kim Eun-jung	0	0	1	0	2	0	2	X	5

=== Draw 5 ===
Friday, October 13, 11:00 am

Sheet 1	1	2	3	4	5	6	7	8	Final
(Japan) Satsuki Fujisawa	0	1	0	0	2	1	0	X	4
(Italy) Diana Gaspari	4	0	0	2	0	0	2	X	8

Sheet 2	1	2	3	4	5	6	7	8	Final
(Lithuania) Virginija Paulauskaitė	1	0	0	0	0	1	0	0	2
(Japan) Chiaki Matsumura	0	0	2	0	1	0	0	1	4

=== Draw 6 ===
Friday, October 13, 2:00 pm

Sheet 1	1	2	3	4	5	6	7	8	Final
(Canada) Shannon Kleibrink	0	2	1	0	3	0	0	X	6
(Japan) Ayumi Ogasawara	1	0	0	1	0	1	1	X	4

Sheet 2	1	2	3	4	5	6	7	8	Final
(Latvia) Ieva Rudzīte	1	0	2	0	1	1	3	0	8
(Finland) Oona Kauste	0	3	0	2	0	0	0	2	7

=== Draw 7 ===
Friday, October 13, 5:00 pm

Sheet 1	1	2	3	4	5	6	7	8	Final
(Switzerland) Cynthia Gertsch	0	1	2	0	0	1	1	1	6
(Switzerland) Ursi Hegner	0	0	0	2	1	0	0	0	3

Sheet 2	1	2	3	4	5	6	7	8	Final
(South Korea) Kim Eun-jung	2	1	0	0	1	1	0	0	5
(Sweden) Therese Westman	0	0	0	1	0	0	2	1	4

=== Draw 8 ===
Friday, October 13, 8:00 pm

Sheet 1	1	2	3	4	5	6	7	8	Final
(Italy) Diana Gaspari	1	1	0	0	2	0	3	X	7
(Lithuania) Virginija Paulauskaitė	0	0	1	1	0	1	0	X	3

Sheet 2	1	2	3	4	5	6	7	8	Final
(Japan) Chiaki Matsumura	0	0	0	3	0	0	2	0	5
(Japan) Satsuki Fujisawa	1	3	0	0	2	0	0	1	7

=== Draw 9 ===
Saturday, October 14, 8:00 am

Sheet 1	1	2	3	4	5	6	7	8	Final
(Japan) Ayumi Ogasawara	0	2	0	1	0	3	0	2	8
(Latvia) Ieva Rudzīte	1	0	1	0	1	0	2	0	5

Sheet 2	1	2	3	4	5	6	7	8	Final
(Finland) Oona Kauste	0	0	0	1	0	0	1	X	2
(Canada) Shannon Kleibrink	0	1	1	0	0	3	0	X	5

== Playoffs ==
Quarterfinals
A1	(South Korea) Kim Eun-jung	9
B3	(Italy) Diana Gaspari	2
B2	(Japan) Chiaki Matsumura	2
C3	(Japan) Ayumi Ogasawara	4
B1	(Japan) Satsuki Fujisawa	2
A2	(Sweden) Therese Westman	6
C1	(Canada) Shannon Kleibrink	7
C2	(Finland) Oona Kauste	3

Semifinals
A1	(South Korea) Kim Eun-jung	5
C3	(Japan) Ayumi Ogasawara	4
A2	(Sweden) Therese Westman	3
C1	(Canada) Shannon Kleibrink	5

Final
A1	(South Korea) Kim Eun-jung	7
C1	(Canada) Shannon Kleibrink	5
Third place
C3	(Japan) Ayumi Ogasawara	3
A2	(Sweden) Therese Westman	6

=== Quarterfinals ===
Saturday, October 14, 12:00 pm

Sheet 1	1	2	3	4	5	6	7	8	Final
(Japan) Chiaki Matsumura	0	0	0	1	0	0	1	X	2
(Japan) Ayumi Ogasawara	0	2	1	0	1	0	0	X	4

Sheet 2	1	2	3	4	5	6	7	8	Final
(South Korea) Kim Eun-jung	0	4	0	0	3	2	X	X	9
(Italy) Diana Gaspari	1	0	0	1	0	0	X	X	2

Saturday, October 14, 3:00 pm

Sheet 1	1	2	3	4	5	6	7	8	Final
(Japan) Satsuki Fujisawa	1	0	1	0	0	0	0	X	2
(Sweden) Therese Westman	0	2	0	0	0	2	2	X	6

Sheet 2	1	2	3	4	5	6	7	8	Final
(Canada) Shannon Kleibrink	0	1	0	2	2	0	2	X	7
(Finland) Oona Kauste	1	0	1	0	0	1	0	X	3

=== Semifinals ===
Sunday, October 15, 10:00 am

Sheet 1	1	2	3	4	5	6	7	8	Final
(South Korea) Kim Eun-jung	1	1	0	1	1	0	0	1	5
(Japan) Ayumi Ogasawara	0	0	1	0	0	2	1	0	4

Sheet 2	1	2	3	4	5	6	7	8	Final
(Sweden) Therese Westman	0	0	2	0	0	1	0	0	3
(Canada) Shannon Kleibrink	0	2	0	1	1	0	0	1	5

=== Third place game ===
Sunday, October 15, 2:00 pm

Sheet 1	1	2	3	4	5	6	7	8	Final
(Japan) Ayumi Ogasawara	1	0	0	1	0	0	1	0	3
(Sweden) Therese Westman	0	0	1	0	3	1	0	1	6

=== Final ===
Sunday, October 15, 2:00 pm

Sheet 2	1	2	3	4	5	6	7	8	Final
(South Korea) Kim Eun-jung	0	2	0	2	0	2	0	1	7
(Canada) Shannon Kleibrink	0	0	3	0	1	0	1	0	5
