= Gothenburg Mixed Doubles Cup =

World Curling Tour event

- Established: 2018
- Host city: Gothenburg, Sweden
- Arena: Gothenburg Curling Hall
- Purse: SEK 75,000
- 2025 champion: (United States) Cory Thiesse / Korey Dropkin

Current edition
- 2025 Gothenburg Mixed Doubles Cup

The Gothenburg Mixed Doubles Cup is an annual mixed doubles curling tournament on the ISS Mixed Doubles World Curling Tour. It is held annually at the end of the calendar year at the Gothenburg Curling Hall in Gothenburg, Sweden.

The purse for the event is SEK 75,000 with the winning team receiving SEK 30,000 and its event categorization is 500 (highest calibre is 1000).

The event has been held since 2018. It became a World Curling Tour event in 2019.

The 2021 event featured many of the teams that had qualified for the 2022 Winter Olympics.

== Past champions ==
Year	Winning pair	Runner up pair	Third place	Fourth place	Purse
2018	(Russia) Alina Biktimirova / Timur Gadzhikanov	(Sweden) Therese Westman / Robin Ahlberg	(Poland) Alexandra Bylina / Karol Nowakowski	(Latvia) Dace Regža / Ansis Regža	SEK 12,500
2019	(Switzerland) Michèle Jäggi / Marc Pfister	(Norway) Martine Rønning / Mathias Brænden	(Sweden) Therese Westman / Robin Ahlberg	(Denmark) Natalie Wiksten / Kasper Wiksten	SEK 17,000
2020	Cancelled due to the COVID-19 pandemic in Sweden				
2021	(Norway) Kristin Skaslien / Magnus Nedregotten	(Sweden) Almida de Val / Oskar Eriksson	(Scotland) Jennifer Dodds / Bruce Mouat	(Switzerland) Jenny Perret / Martin Rios	SEK 75,000
2022	(Sweden) Therese Westman / Robin Ahlberg	(Norway) Kristin Skaslien / Magnus Nedregotten	(Denmark) Jasmin Lander / Henrik Holtermann	(Norway) Maia Ramsfjell / Magnus Ramsfjell	SEK 95,000
2023	(Sweden) Anna Hasselborg / Oskar Eriksson	(Sweden) Isabella Wranå / Rasmus Wranå	(Denmark) Jasmin Lander / Henrik Holtermann	(Sweden) Almida de Val / Daniel Magnusson	SEK 95,000
2024	(Scotland) Jennifer Dodds / Bruce Mouat	(Estonia) Marie Kaldvee / Harri Lill	(Switzerland) Alina Pätz / Sven Michel	(Sweden) Anna Hasselborg / Oskar Eriksson	SEK 100,000
2025	(United States) Cory Thiesse / Korey Dropkin	(Scotland) Jennifer Dodds / Bruce Mouat	(Switzerland) Laura Engler / Kevin Wunderlin	(Norway) Kristin Skaslien / Magnus Nedregotten	SEK 75,000
