= 2025 Ocean Contractors Men's Curling Championship =

Canadian provincial men's curling championship

- Host city: Halifax, Nova Scotia
- Arena: Halifax Curling Club
- Dates: January 14–19
- Winner: Team Purcell
- Curling club: Halifax CC, Halifax
- Skip: Owen Purcell
- Third: Luke Saunders
- Second: Scott Saccary
- Lead: Ryan Abraham
- Coach: Colleen Jones
- Finalist: Kendal Thompson

The 2025 Ocean Contractors Men's Curling Championship, the provincial men's curling championship for Nova Scotia, was held from January 14 to 19 at the Halifax Curling Club in Halifax, Nova Scotia. The winning Owen Purcell rink represented Nova Scotia at the 2025 Montana's Brier in Kelowna, British Columbia. The event was held in conjunction with the 2025 Ocean Contractors Women's Curling Championship, the provincial women's championship.

The tournament returned to a round robin format, which was last used in 2020.

== Qualification process ==
Qualification method	Berths	Qualifying team(s)
2024 provincial finalists	2	Matthew Manuel; Owen Purcell
2024-25 CTRS leaders	2	Kendal Thompson; Colten Steele
Open Qualifier	4	Calan MacIsaac; Paul Flemming; Nick Deagle; Brent MacDougall

== Teams ==
The teams are listed as follows:

Skip	Third	Second	Lead	Alternate	Coach	Club
Nick Deagle	Jason van Vonderen	Rob Phillips	Nick MacInnis	Ryan Sperry		Bridgewater CC, Bridgewater
Paul Flemming	Peter Burgess	Ian Juurlink	Kelly Mittelstadt			Truro CC, Truro
Brent MacDougall	Ben Mayhew	Nick Burdock	Scott Weagle			Halifax CC, Halifax
Calan MacIsaac	Nathan Gray	Owain Fisher	Christopher McCurdy	Craig Burgess		Truro CC, Truro
Matthew Manuel	Cameron MacKenzie	Jeffrey Meagher	Nick Zachernuk		Kim Kelly	Halifax CC, Halifax
Owen Purcell	Luke Saunders	Scott Saccary	Ryan Abraham		Colleen Jones	Halifax CC, Halifax
Colten Steele	Kerry MacLean	Paul Dexter	Robby McLean		Marty Gavin	Dartmouth CC, Dartmouth
Kendal Thompson	Stuart Thompson	Bryce Everist	Michael Brophy			Halifax CC, Halifax

== Round robin standings ==
Final Round Robin Standings

Key
Teams to Playoffs

Skip	W	L	W–L	PF	PA	EW	EL	BE	SE
Owen Purcell	6	1	–	49	24	30	19	6	10
Calan MacIsaac	5	2	1–0	48	42	25	28	7	4
Kendal Thompson	5	2	0–1	56	41	33	27	1	7
Matthew Manuel	4	3	–	47	42	28	27	5	7
Paul Flemming	3	4	1–0	42	46	25	27	4	3
Colten Steele	3	4	0–1	37	47	23	28	4	2
Nick Deagle	1	6	1–0	39	61	23	34	2	3
Brent MacDougall	1	6	0–1	36	51	25	22	3	7

== Round robin results ==
All draw times listed in Atlantic Time (UTC−04:00).

=== Draw 2 ===
Tuesday, January 14, 7:00 pm

Sheet 1	1	2	3	4	5	6	7	8	9	10	Final
Paul Flemming 🔨	3	0	0	1	0	2	0	3	X	X	9
Colten Steele	0	0	1	0	2	0	1	0	X	X	4

Sheet 8	1	2	3	4	5	6	7	8	9	10	Final
Kendal Thompson 🔨	1	0	0	1	0	0	2	0	0	X	4
Brent MacDougall	0	2	1	0	2	1	0	1	1	X	8

Sheet 2	1	2	3	4	5	6	7	8	9	10	Final
Owen Purcell	1	1	0	0	1	2	2	1	X	X	8
Nick Deagle 🔨	0	0	0	0	0	0	0	0	X	X	0

Sheet 4	1	2	3	4	5	6	7	8	9	10	Final
Matthew Manuel	0	1	0	0	1	0	1	0	2	X	5
Calan MacIsaac 🔨	1	0	2	2	0	1	0	2	0	X	8

=== Draw 4 ===
Wednesday, January 15, 12:00 pm

Sheet 1	1	2	3	4	5	6	7	8	9	10	Final
Owen Purcell 🔨	2	0	2	0	6	X	X	X	X	X	10
Brent MacDougall	0	1	0	2	0	X	X	X	X	X	3

Sheet 8	1	2	3	4	5	6	7	8	9	10	Final
Colten Steele	0	1	0	0	2	0	1	0	4	X	8
Calan MacIsaac 🔨	1	0	0	0	0	1	0	2	0	X	4

Sheet 2	1	2	3	4	5	6	7	8	9	10	Final
Matthew Manuel	0	0	2	0	0	2	0	0	3	X	7
Paul Flemming 🔨	0	2	0	0	1	0	1	1	0	X	5

Sheet 4	1	2	3	4	5	6	7	8	9	10	Final
Kendal Thompson 🔨	2	0	3	0	0	1	0	3	0	2	11
Nick Deagle	0	3	0	1	1	0	2	0	2	0	9

=== Draw 6 ===
Wednesday, January 15, 8:00 pm

Sheet 1	1	2	3	4	5	6	7	8	9	10	Final
Matthew Manuel	1	1	0	1	3	0	3	X	X	X	9
Nick Deagle 🔨	0	0	1	0	0	2	0	X	X	X	3

Sheet 8	1	2	3	4	5	6	7	8	9	10	Final
Owen Purcell	1	0	0	2	0	2	0	3	X	X	8
Paul Flemming 🔨	0	1	0	0	1	0	1	0	X	X	3

Sheet 2	1	2	3	4	5	6	7	8	9	10	Final
Kendal Thompson 🔨	2	0	0	1	0	1	0	1	1	0	6
Calan MacIsaac	0	1	0	0	1	0	3	0	0	4	9

Sheet 4	1	2	3	4	5	6	7	8	9	10	Final
Colten Steele 🔨	2	0	0	0	3	0	0	0	1	X	6
Brent MacDougall	0	1	0	0	0	0	0	2	0	X	3

=== Draw 8 ===
Thursday, January 16, 2:00 pm

Sheet 1	1	2	3	4	5	6	7	8	9	10	Final
Owen Purcell	0	1	0	0	1	0	1	0	1	0	4
Kendal Thompson 🔨	1	0	1	0	0	1	0	2	0	1	6

Sheet 8	1	2	3	4	5	6	7	8	9	10	Final
Matthew Manuel	3	2	0	2	0	1	0	2	X	X	10
Colten Steele 🔨	0	0	1	0	2	0	2	0	X	X	5

Sheet 2	1	2	3	4	5	6	7	8	9	10	Final
Nick Deagle 🔨	0	4	0	1	0	3	0	X	X	X	8
Brent MacDougall	1	0	2	0	2	0	1	X	X	X	6

Sheet 4	1	2	3	4	5	6	7	8	9	10	Final
Paul Flemming 🔨	1	0	0	1	0	0	1	0	1	0	4
Calan MacIsaac	0	2	0	0	0	0	0	1	0	2	5

=== Draw 10 ===
Friday, January 17, 9:00 am

Sheet 1	1	2	3	4	5	6	7	8	9	10	Final
Colten Steele	2	0	1	0	2	0	1	0	3	X	9
Nick Deagle 🔨	0	1	0	1	0	1	0	2	0	X	5

Sheet 8	1	2	3	4	5	6	7	8	9	10	Final
Kendal Thompson 🔨	2	1	0	2	0	1	4	X	X	X	10
Paul Flemming	0	0	2	0	2	0	0	X	X	X	4

Sheet 2	1	2	3	4	5	6	7	8	9	10	Final
Owen Purcell 🔨	0	0	2	1	0	0	0	1	0	2	6
Calan MacIsaac	0	0	0	0	2	0	0	0	2	0	4

Sheet 4	1	2	3	4	5	6	7	8	9	10	Final
Matthew Manuel 🔨	2	0	2	0	0	0	0	2	0	X	6
Brent MacDougall	0	1	0	2	1	0	0	0	1	X	5

=== Draw 12 ===
Friday, January 17, 7:00 pm

Sheet 1	1	2	3	4	5	6	7	8	9	10	Final
Matthew Manuel 🔨	1	0	1	0	1	2	0	0	1	0	6
Kendal Thompson	0	2	0	1	0	0	2	1	0	4	10

Sheet 8	1	2	3	4	5	6	7	8	9	10	Final
Nick Deagle 🔨	2	2	0	0	0	2	0	0	0	X	6
Calan MacIsaac	0	0	1	1	2	0	0	3	2	X	9

Sheet 2	1	2	3	4	5	6	7	8	9	10	Final
Paul Flemming 🔨	2	1	0	0	1	0	0	0	4	X	8
Brent MacDougall	0	0	0	2	0	1	0	1	0	X	4

Sheet 4	1	2	3	4	5	6	7	8	9	10	Final
Owen Purcell	0	2	0	1	1	0	1	0	2	X	7
Colten Steele 🔨	1	0	1	0	0	1	0	1	0	X	4

=== Draw 14 ===
Saturday, January 18, 12:00 pm

Sheet 1	1	2	3	4	5	6	7	8	9	10	Final
Calan MacIsaac 🔨	0	1	0	1	0	5	0	0	0	2	9
Brent MacDougall	3	0	1	0	1	0	2	0	0	0	7

Sheet 8	1	2	3	4	5	6	7	8	9	10	Final
Owen Purcell 🔨	0	1	0	2	0	2	0	0	0	1	6
Matthew Manuel	1	0	2	0	1	0	0	0	0	0	4

Sheet 2	1	2	3	4	5	6	7	8	9	10	Final
Kendal Thompson 🔨	2	0	1	0	2	1	3	X	X	X	9
Colten Steele	0	0	0	1	0	0	0	X	X	X	1

Sheet 4	1	2	3	4	5	6	7	8	9	10	Final
Paul Flemming	0	3	0	2	0	0	3	0	1	0	9
Nick Deagle 🔨	1	0	2	0	1	1	0	1	0	2	8

== Playoffs ==
Semifinal			Final
			1	Owen Purcell	8
2	Calan MacIsaac	4	3	Kendal Thompson	5
3	Kendal Thompson	11

=== Semifinal ===
Saturday, January 18, 6:00 pm

Sheet 2	1	2	3	4	5	6	7	8	9	10	Final
Calan MacIsaac 🔨	0	1	0	1	0	2	0	0	0	X	4
Kendal Thompson	1	0	3	0	1	0	2	1	3	X	11

=== Final ===
Sunday, January 19, 2:00 pm

Sheet 8	1	2	3	4	5	6	7	8	9	10	Final
Owen Purcell 🔨	0	1	0	0	2	2	0	2	0	1	8
Kendal Thompson	0	0	2	0	0	0	1	0	2	0	5

2025 Ocean Contractors Men's Curling Championship

Owen Purcell
1st Nova Scotia Provincial Championship title
