= Mixed Doubles Łódź =

World Curling Tour event

- Established: 2018
- Host city: Łódź, Poland
- Arena: Curling Łódź
- Purse: € 5,000
- 2026 champion: (Italy) Maurino / Gonin

The Mixed Doubles Łódź is an annual mixed doubles curling tournament on the ISS Mixed Doubles World Curling Tour. It is held annually in the Fall at Curling Łódź in Łódź, Poland.

The purse for the event is €4,500, with the winning pair receiving €1,900. Its event categorization is 100 (highest calibre is 1000).

The event has been held since 2018.

== Past champions ==
Year	Winning pair	Runner up pair	Third place	Fourth place	Purse (€)
2018	(Scotland) Judith McCleary / Lee McCleary	(Finland) Elina Virtaala / Tomi Rantamäki	(Norway) Kristin Skaslien / Magnus Nedregotten	(Hungary) Dorottya Palancsa / Zsolt Kiss	€4,000
2019	(Hungary) Ildikó Szekeres / György Nagy	(China) Fan Suyuan / Nan Jiawen	(China) Yang Ying / Ling Zhi	(Scotland) Judith McCleary / Lee McCleary	$CA4,132
2020	(Poland) Aneta Lipińska / Konrad Stych	(Czech Republic) Zuzana Paulová / Tomáš Paul	(Hungary) Ildikó Szekeres / György Nagy	(Estonia) Karoliine Kaare / Harri Lill	€2,500
2021	(Switzerland) Daniela Rupp / Kevin Wunderlin	(Estonia) Marie Turmann / Harri Lill	(Switzerland) Jenny Perret / Martin Rios	(Czech Republic) Zuzana Paulová / Tomáš Paul	€3,500
2022	(Switzerland) Lea Hüppi / Jonas Weiss	(Czech Republic) Jana Jelínková / Ondřej Mihola	(Czech Republic) Julie Zelingrová / Vít Chabičovský	(Latvia) Daina Barone / Arnis Veidemanis	€3,500
2023	(Norway) Kristin Skaslien / Magnus Nedregotten	(Estonia) Karoliine Kaare / Harri Lill	(Sweden) Therese Westman / Robin Ahlberg	(Poland) Adela Walczak / Andrzej Augustyniak	€3,500
2024	(Germany) Emira Abbes / Klaudius Harsch	(Turkey) Dilşat Yıldız / Bilal Ömer Çakır	(Poland) Adela Walczak / Andrzej Augustyniak	(Finland) Tiina Suuripää / Markus Sipilä	€3,500
2025	(Sweden) Therese Westman / Robin Ahlberg	(Norway) Eilin Kjærland / Mathias Brænden	(Latvia) Katrina Gaidule / Roberts Buncis	(Germany) Vera Tiuliakova / Sixten Totzek	€4,500
2026	(Italy) Giorgia Maurino / Simone Gonin	(Poland) Adela Walczak / Andrzej Augustyniak	(Estonia) Karoliine Kaare / Harri Lill	(Czech Republic) Klára Macková / Tomáš Maček	€5,000
