= 2026 World Junior-B Curling Championships =

- Host city: Lohja, Finland
- Arena: Kisakallio Sports Institute
- Dates: December 8–21

The 2026 World Junior-B Curling Championships was held from December 8 to 21 at the Kisakallio Sports Institute in Lohja, Finland. The men's competition was from December 8 to 14, with the women's competition following from December 16 to 21. The top six men's teams and top five women's teams will qualify for the 2027 World Junior Curling Championships in Aberdeen, Scotland.

== Men ==
=== Teams ===
The teams are listed as follows:

Australia	Austria	Brazil	China	Chinese Taipei
Skip: Third: Second: Lead: Alternate:	Skip: Third: Second: Lead: Alternate:	Skip: Third: Second: Lead: Alternate:	Skip: Third: Second: Lead: Alternate:	Skip: Third: Second: Lead: Alternate:
Czech Republic	England	Finland	Germany	Hong Kong
Skip: Third: Second: Lead: Alternate:	Skip: Third: Second: Lead: Alternate:	Skip: Third: Second: Lead: Alternate:	Skip: Third: Second: Lead: Alternate:	Skip: Third: Second: Lead: Alternate:
Hungary	Kazakhstan	Latvia	New Zealand	Philippines
Skip: Third: Second: Lead: Alternate:	Skip: Third: Second: Lead: Alternate:	Skip: Third: Second: Lead: Alternate:	Skip: Third: Second: Lead: Alternate:	Skip: Third: Second: Lead: Alternate:
Qatar	Romania	Russia	Slovenia	Spain
Skip: Third: Second: Lead: Alternate:	Skip: Third: Second: Lead: Alternate:	Skip: Third: Second: Lead: Alternate:	Skip: Third: Second: Lead: Alternate:	Skip: Third: Second: Lead: Alternate:
Sweden	Turkey			
Skip: Third: Second: Lead: Alternate:	Skip: Third: Second: Lead: Alternate:			

=== Round robin standings ===
After draw

Key
Teams to Playoffs

Group A	Skip	W	L	W–L	DSC
Czech Republic				–	
Germany				–	
Hong Kong				–	
Kazakhstan				–	
New Zealand				–	
Slovenia				–	
Spain				–	

Group B	Skip	W	L	W–L	DSC
Australia				–	
China				–	
Chinese Taipei				–	
Hungary				–	
Qatar				–	
Romania				–	
Turkey				–	

Group C	Skip	W	L	W–L	DSC
Austria				–	
Brazil				–	
England				–	
Finland				–	
Latvia				–	
Philippines				–	
Russia				–	
Sweden				–	

Ranking of 3rd Place Teams	Skip	Group	DSC
		A	
		B	
		C	

Group A Round Robin Summary Table
Pos.	Country	Czech Republic	Germany	Hong Kong	Kazakhstan	New Zealand	Slovenia	Estonia	Record
1	Czech Republic	—	D5	D14	D12	D1	D8	D10	–
1	Germany	D5	—	D16	D3	D14	D10	D7	–
1	Hong Kong	D14	D16	—	D4	D10	D6	D3	–
1	Kazakhstan	D12	D3	D4	—	D8	D1	D14	–
1	New Zealand	D1	D14	D10	D8	—	D12	D5	–
1	Slovenia	D8	D10	D6	D1	D12	—	D16	–
1	Spain	D10	D7	D3	D14	D5	D16	—	–

Group B Round Robin Summary Table
Pos.	Country	Australia	China	Chinese Taipei	Hungary	Qatar	Romania	Turkey	Record
1	Australia	—	D8	D3	D12	D6	D16	D1	–
1	China	D8	—	D10	D1	D14	D6	D12	–
1	Chinese Taipei	D3	D10	—	D8	D4	D12	D14	–
1	Hungary	D12	D1	D8	—	D16	D3	D6	–
1	Qatar	D6	D14	D4	D16	—	D10	D3	–
1	Romania	D16	D6	D12	D3	D10	—	D8	–
1	Turkey	D1	D12	D14	D6	D3	D8	—	–

Group C Round Robin Summary Table
Pos.	Country	Austria	Brazil	England	Finland	Latvia	Philippines	Russia	Swedn	Record
1	Austria	—	D7	D15	D2	D9	D11	D5	D13	–
1	Brazil	D7	—	D11	D9	D2	D15	D13	D4	–
1	England	D15	D11	—	D5	D13	D9	D2	D7	–
1	Finland	D2	D9	D5	—	D7	D13	D15	D11	–
1	Latvia	D9	D2	D13	D7	—	D4	D11	D15	–
1	Philippines	D11	D15	D9	D13	D4	—	D7	D2	–
1	Russia	D5	D13	D2	D15	D11	D7	—	D9	–
1	Sweden	D13	D4	D7	D11	D15	D2	D9	—	–

=== Round robin results ===
All draw times are listed in Eastern European Time (UTC+02:00).

==== Draw 1 ====
Tuesday, December 8, 10:00

Sheet B	1	2	3	4	5	6	7	8	Final
Australia									
Turkey									

Sheet C	1	2	3	4	5	6	7	8	Final
Czech Republic									
New Zealand									

Sheet D	1	2	3	4	5	6	7	8	Final
China									
Hungary									

Sheet E	1	2	3	4	5	6	7	8	Final
Slovenia									
Kazakhstan									

==== Draw 2 ====
Tuesday, December 8, 14:30

Sheet A	1	2	3	4	5	6	7	8	Final
England									
Russia									

Sheet C	1	2	3	4	5	6	7	8	Final
Philippines									
Sweden									

Sheet D	1	2	3	4	5	6	7	8	Final
Brazil									
Latvia									

Sheet E	1	2	3	4	5	6	7	8	Final
Austria									
Finland									

==== Draw 3 ====
Tuesday, December 8, 19:00

Sheet A	1	2	3	4	5	6	7	8	Final
Kazakhstan									
Germany									

Sheet B	1	2	3	4	5	6	7	8	Final
Hungary									
Romania									

Sheet C	1	2	3	4	5	6	7	8	Final
Turkey									
Qatar									

Sheet D	1	2	3	4	5	6	7	8	Final
Chinese Taipei									
Australia									

Sheet E	1	2	3	4	5	6	7	8	Final
Spain									
Hong Kong									

==== Draw 4 ====
Wednesday, December 9, 10:00

Sheet A	1	2	3	4	5	6	7	8	Final
Qatar									
Chinese Taipei									

Sheet B	1	2	3	4	5	6	7	8	Final
Philippines									
Latvia									

Sheet C	1	2	3	4	5	6	7	8	Final
Hong Kong									
Kazakhstan									

Sheet E	1	2	3	4	5	6	7	8	Final
Sweden									
Brazil									

==== Draw 5 ====
Wednesday, December 9, 14:30

Sheet B	1	2	3	4	5	6	7	8	Final
New Zealand									
Spain									

Sheet C	1	2	3	4	5	6	7	8	Final
Finland									
England									

Sheet D	1	2	3	4	5	6	7	8	Final
Austria									
Russia									

Sheet E	1	2	3	4	5	6	7	8	Final
Germany									
Czech Republic									

==== Draw 6 ====
Wednesday, December 9, 19:00

Sheet A	1	2	3	4	5	6	7	8	Final
Hungary									
Turkey									

Sheet B	1	2	3	4	5	6	7	8	Final
Qatar									
Australia									

Sheet D	1	2	3	4	5	6	7	8	Final
Slovenia									
Hong Kong									

Sheet E	1	2	3	4	5	6	7	8	Final
China									
Romania									

==== Draw 7 ====
Thursday, December 10, 10:00

Sheet A	1	2	3	4	5	6	7	8	Final
Latvia									
Finland									

Sheet B	1	2	3	4	5	6	7	8	Final
Brazil									
Austria									

Sheet C	1	2	3	4	5	6	7	8	Final
Germany									
Spain									

Sheet D	1	2	3	4	5	6	7	8	Final
England									
Sweden									

Sheet E	1	2	3	4	5	6	7	8	Final
Russia									
Philippines									

==== Draw 8 ====
Thursday, December 10, 14:30

Sheet A	1	2	3	4	5	6	7	8	Final
Australia									
China									

Sheet B	1	2	3	4	5	6	7	8	Final
Czech Republic									
Slovenia									

Sheet C	1	2	3	4	5	6	7	8	Final
Chinese Taipei									
Hungary									

Sheet D	1	2	3	4	5	6	7	8	Final
Romania									
Turkey									

Sheet E	1	2	3	4	5	6	7	8	Final
Kazakhstan									
New Zealand									

==== Draw 9 ====
Thursday, December 10, 19:00

Sheet A	1	2	3	4	5	6	7	8	Final
Philippines									
England									

Sheet B	1	2	3	4	5	6	7	8	Final
Sweden									
Russia									

Sheet C	1	2	3	4	5	6	7	8	Final
Austria									
Latvia									

Sheet D	1	2	3	4	5	6	7	8	Final
Finland									
Brazil									

==== Draw 10 ====
Friday, December 11, 10:00

Sheet A	1	2	3	4	5	6	7	8	Final
New Zealand									
Hong Kong									

Sheet B	1	2	3	4	5	6	7	8	Final
China									
Chinese Taipei									

Sheet C	1	2	3	4	5	6	7	8	Final
Slovenia									
Germany									

Sheet D	1	2	3	4	5	6	7	8	Final
Czech Republic									
Spain									

Sheet E	1	2	3	4	5	6	7	8	Final
Romania									
Qatar									

==== Draw 11 ====
Friday, December 11, 14:30

Sheet A	1	2	3	4	5	6	7	8	Final
Russia									
Latvia									

Sheet B	1	2	3	4	5	6	7	8	Final
England									
Brazil									

Sheet C	1	2	3	4	5	6	7	8	Final
Sweden									
Finland									

Sheet D	1	2	3	4	5	6	7	8	Final
Philippines									
Austria									

==== Draw 12 ====
Friday, December 11, 19:00

Sheet A	1	2	3	4	5	6	7	8	Final
Chinese Taipei									
Romania									

Sheet B	1	2	3	4	5	6	7	8	Final
Turkey									
China									

Sheet C	1	2	3	4	5	6	7	8	Final
New Zealand									
Slovenia									

Sheet D	1	2	3	4	5	6	7	8	Final
Kazakhstan									
Czech Republic									

Sheet E	1	2	3	4	5	6	7	8	Final
Australia									
Hungary									

==== Draw 13 ====
Saturday, December 12, 10:00

Sheet A	1	2	3	4	5	6	7	8	Final
Austria									
Sweden									

Sheet B	1	2	3	4	5	6	7	8	Final
Finland									
Philippines									

Sheet C	1	2	3	4	5	6	7	8	Final
Brazil									
Russia									

Sheet E	1	2	3	4	5	6	7	8	Final
Latvia									
England									

==== Draw 14 ====
Saturday, December 12, 14:30

Sheet A	1	2	3	4	5	6	7	8	Final
Hong Kong									
Czech Republic									

Sheet B	1	2	3	4	5	6	7	8	Final
Spain									
Kazakhstan									

Sheet C	1	2	3	4	5	6	7	8	Final
Qatar									
China									

Sheet D	1	2	3	4	5	6	7	8	Final
Germany									
New Zealand									

Sheet E	1	2	3	4	5	6	7	8	Final
Turkey									
Chinese Taipei									

==== Draw 15 ====
Saturday, December 12, 19:00

Sheet A	1	2	3	4	5	6	7	8	Final
Brazil									
Philippines									

Sheet B	1	2	3	4	5	6	7	8	Final
Latvia									
Sweden									

Sheet C	1	2	3	4	5	6	7	8	Final
England									
Austria									

Sheet D	1	2	3	4	5	6	7	8	Final
Russia									
Finland									

==== Draw 16 ====
Sunday, December 13, 10:00

Sheet A	1	2	3	4	5	6	7	8	Final
Spain									
Slovenia									

Sheet B	1	2	3	4	5	6	7	8	Final
Hong Kong									
Germany									

Sheet C	1	2	3	4	5	6	7	8	Final
Romania									
Australia									

Sheet D	1	2	3	4	5	6	7	8	Final
Hungary									
Qatar									

=== Playoffs ===
Quarterfinals
1
8
4
5
2
7
3
6

Semifinals

Gold medal game
Third place

==== Quarterfinals ====
Sunday, December 13, 16:00

Sheet A	1	2	3	4	5	6	7	8	Final

Sheet B	1	2	3	4	5	6	7	8	Final

Sheet C	1	2	3	4	5	6	7	8	Final

Sheet D	1	2	3	4	5	6	7	8	Final

==== Semifinals ====
Monday, December 14, 10:00

Sheet A	1	2	3	4	5	6	7	8	Final

Sheet D	1	2	3	4	5	6	7	8	Final

==== Bronze medal game ====
Monday, December 14, 16:00

Sheet B	1	2	3	4	5	6	7	8	Final

==== Gold medal game ====
Monday, December 14, 16:00

Sheet C	1	2	3	4	5	6	7	8	Final

=== Qualification Playoffs ===
Monday, December 14, 10:00

Sheet B	1	2	3	4	5	6	7	8	Final

Sheet C	1	2	3	4	5	6	7	8	Final

=== Final standings ===
Key
Teams Advance to the 2027 World Junior Curling Championships

Place	Team
1st place, gold medalist(s)	
2nd place, silver medalist(s)	
3rd place, bronze medalist(s)	
4	
5	
6	
7	
8	
9	
10	
11	
12	
13	
14	
15	
16	
17	
18	
19	
20	
21	
22	

== Women ==
=== Teams ===
The teams are listed as follows:

Australia	Belgium	Chinese Taipei	Czech Republic	England
Skip: Third: Second: Lead: Alternate:	Skip: Third: Second: Lead: Alternate:	Skip: Third: Second: Lead: Alternate:	Skip: Third: Second: Lead: Alternate:	Skip: Third: Second: Lead: Alternate:
Estonia	Finland	Hong Kong	Hungary	Italy
Skip: Third: Second: Lead: Alternate:	Skip: Third: Second: Lead: Alternate:	Skip: Third: Second: Lead: Alternate:	Skip: Third: Second: Lead: Alternate:	Skip: Third: Second: Lead: Alternate:
Kazakhstan	Latvia	Lithuania	New Zealand	Norway
Skip: Third: Second: Lead: Alternate:	Skip: Third: Second: Lead: Alternate:	Skip: Third: Second: Lead: Alternate:	Skip: Third: Second: Lead: Alternate:	Skip: Third: Second: Lead: Alternate:
Poland	Romania	Russia	Slovenia	Spain
Skip: Third: Second: Lead: Alternate:	Skip: Third: Second: Lead: Alternate:	Skip: Third: Second: Lead: Alternate:	Skip: Third: Second: Lead: Alternate:	Skip: Third: Second: Lead: Alternate:

=== Round robin standings ===
After draw

Key
Teams to Playoffs

Group A	Skip	W	L	W–L	DSC
Australia				–	
Belgium				–	
Czech Republic				–	
Estonia				–	
New Zealand				–	
Norway				–	
Romania				–	

Group B	Skip	W	L	W–L	DSC
Chinese Taipei				–	
Finland				–	
Latvia				–	
Poland				–	
Russia				–	
Slovenia				–	
Spain				–	

Group C	Skip	W	L	W–L	DSC
England				–	
Hong Kong				–	
Hungary				–	
Italy				–	
Kazakhstan				–	
Lithuania				–	

Ranking of 3rd Place Teams	Skip	Group	DSC
		A	
		B	
		C	

Group A Round Robin Summary Table
Pos.	Country	Australia	Belgium	Czech Republic	Estonia	New Zealand	Norway	Romania	Record
1	Australia	—	D3	D6	D14	D9	D11	D7	–
1	Belgium	D3	—	D1	D10	D6	D14	D9	–
1	Czech Republic	D6	D1	—	D3	D12	D8	D4	–
1	Estonia	D14	D10	D3	—	D7	D1	D12	–
1	New Zealand	D9	D6	D12	D7	—	D4	D2	–
1	Norway	D11	D14	D8	D1	D4	—	D6	–
1	Romania	D7	D9	D4	D12	D2	D6	—	–

Group B Round Robin Summary Table
Pos.	Country	Chinese Taipei	Finland	Latvia	Poland	Russia	Slovenia	Spain	Record
1	Chinese Taipei	—	D14	D2	D12	D7	D9	D10	–
1	Finland	D14	—	D12	D10	D9	D5	D1	–
1	Latvia	D2	D12	—	D5	D10	D7	D14	–
1	Poland	D12	D10	D5	—	D14	D3	D8	–
1	Russia	D7	D9	D10	D14	—	D1	D5	–
1	Slovenia	D9	D5	D7	D3	D1	—	D12	–
1	Spain	D10	D1	D14	D8	D5	D12	—	–

Group C Round Robin Summary Table
Pos.	Country	England	Hong Kong	Hungary	Italy	Kazakhstan	Lithuania	Record
1	England	—	D4	D13	D2	D11	D8	–
1	Hong Kong	D4	—	D11	D13	D8	D3	–
1	Hungary	D13	D11	—	D9	D3	D5	–
1	Italy	D2	D13	D9	—	D5	D11	–
1	Kazakhstan	D11	D8	D3	D5	—	D13	–
1	Lithuania	D8	D3	D5	D11	D13	—	–

=== Round robin results ===
All draw times are listed in Eastern European Time (UTC+02:00).

==== Draw 1 ====
Wednesday, December 16, 10:00

Sheet A	1	2	3	4	5	6	7	8	Final
Slovenia									
Russia									

Sheet B	1	2	3	4	5	6	7	8	Final
Spain									
Finland									

Sheet D	1	2	3	4	5	6	7	8	Final
Belgium									
Czech Republic									

Sheet E	1	2	3	4	5	6	7	8	Final
Estonia									
Norway									

==== Draw 2 ====
Wednesday, December 16, 14:30

Sheet B	1	2	3	4	5	6	7	8	Final
Romania									
New Zealand									

Sheet D	1	2	3	4	5	6	7	8	Final
Chinese Taipei									
Latvia									

Sheet E	1	2	3	4	5	6	7	8	Final
England									
Italy									

==== Draw 3 ====
Wednesday, December 16, 19:00

Sheet A	1	2	3	4	5	6	7	8	Final
Czech Republic									
Estonia									

Sheet B	1	2	3	4	5	6	7	8	Final
Lithuania									
Hong Kong									

Sheet C	1	2	3	4	5	6	7	8	Final
Belgium									
Australia									

Sheet D	1	2	3	4	5	6	7	8	Final
Kazakhstan									
Hungary									

Sheet E	1	2	3	4	5	6	7	8	Final
Poland									
Slovenia									

==== Draw 4 ====
Thursday, December 17, 10:00

Sheet A	1	2	3	4	5	6	7	8	Final
Norway									
New Zealand									

Sheet C	1	2	3	4	5	6	7	8	Final
Hong Kong									
England									

Sheet E	1	2	3	4	5	6	7	8	Final
Czech Republic									
Romania									

==== Draw 5 ====
Thursday, December 17, 14:30

Sheet A	1	2	3	4	5	6	7	8	Final
Italy									
Kazakhstan									

Sheet B	1	2	3	4	5	6	7	8	Final
Latvia									
Poland									

Sheet C	1	2	3	4	5	6	7	8	Final
Finland									
Slovenia									

Sheet D	1	2	3	4	5	6	7	8	Final
Russia									
Spain									

Sheet E	1	2	3	4	5	6	7	8	Final
Hungary									
Lithuania									

==== Draw 6 ====
Thursday, December 17, 19:00

Sheet B	1	2	3	4	5	6	7	8	Final
Australia									
Czech Republic									

Sheet C	1	2	3	4	5	6	7	8	Final
Romania									
Norway									

Sheet E	1	2	3	4	5	6	7	8	Final
New Zealand									
Belgium									

==== Draw 7 ====
Friday, December 18, 10:00

Sheet A	1	2	3	4	5	6	7	8	Final
Australia									
Romania									

Sheet B	1	2	3	4	5	6	7	8	Final
Chinese Taipei									
Russia									

Sheet C	1	2	3	4	5	6	7	8	Final
Estonia									
New Zealand									

Sheet D	1	2	3	4	5	6	7	8	Final
Latvia									
Slovenia									

==== Draw 8 ====
Friday, December 18, 14:30

Sheet A	1	2	3	4	5	6	7	8	Final
Lithuania									
England									

Sheet B	1	2	3	4	5	6	7	8	Final
Czech Republic									
Norway									

Sheet C	1	2	3	4	5	6	7	8	Final
Poland									
Spain									

Sheet E	1	2	3	4	5	6	7	8	Final
Kazakhstan									
Hong Kong									

==== Draw 9 ====
Friday, December 18, 19:00

Sheet A	1	2	3	4	5	6	7	8	Final
Romania									
Belgium									

Sheet B	1	2	3	4	5	6	7	8	Final
Hungary									
Italy									

Sheet C	1	2	3	4	5	6	7	8	Final
Slovenia									
Chinese Taipei									

Sheet D	1	2	3	4	5	6	7	8	Final
New Zealand									
Australia									

Sheet E	1	2	3	4	5	6	7	8	Final
Finland									
Russia									

==== Draw 10 ====
Saturday, December 19, 10:00

Sheet A	1	2	3	4	5	6	7	8	Final
Spain									
Chinese Taipei									

Sheet B	1	2	3	4	5	6	7	8	Final
Belgium									
Estonia									

Sheet C	1	2	3	4	5	6	7	8	Final
Russia									
Latvia									

Sheet D	1	2	3	4	5	6	7	8	Final
Poland									
Finland									

==== Draw 11 ====
Saturday, December 19, 14:30

Sheet A	1	2	3	4	5	6	7	8	Final
Hong Kong									
Hungary									

Sheet C	1	2	3	4	5	6	7	8	Final
Italy									
Lithuania									

Sheet D	1	2	3	4	5	6	7	8	Final
England									
Kazakhstan									

Sheet E	1	2	3	4	5	6	7	8	Final
Norway									
Australia									

==== Draw 12 ====
Saturday, December 19, 19:00

Sheet A	1	2	3	4	5	6	7	8	Final
Latvia									
Finland									

Sheet B	1	2	3	4	5	6	7	8	Final
Slovenia									
Spain									

Sheet C	1	2	3	4	5	6	7	8	Final
New Zealand									
Czech Republic									

Sheet D	1	2	3	4	5	6	7	8	Final
Estonia									
Romania									

Sheet E	1	2	3	4	5	6	7	8	Final
Chinese Taipei									
Poland									

==== Draw 13 ====
Sunday, December 20, 9:00

Sheet B	1	2	3	4	5	6	7	8	Final
Kazakhstan									
Lithuania									

Sheet C	1	2	3	4	5	6	7	8	Final
England									
Hungary									

Sheet D	1	2	3	4	5	6	7	8	Final
Italy									
Hong Kong									

==== Draw 14 ====
Sunday, December 20, 13:00

Sheet A	1	2	3	4	5	6	7	8	Final
Russia									
Poland									

Sheet B	1	2	3	4	5	6	7	8	Final
Finland									
Chinese Taipei									

Sheet C	1	2	3	4	5	6	7	8	Final
Australia									
Estonia									

Sheet D	1	2	3	4	5	6	7	8	Final
Norway									
Belgium									

Sheet E	1	2	3	4	5	6	7	8	Final
Spain									
Latvia									

=== Playoffs ===
Quarterfinals
1
8
4
5
2
7
3
6

Semifinals

Gold medal game
Third place

==== Quarterfinals ====
Sunday, December 20, 19:00

Sheet A	1	2	3	4	5	6	7	8	Final

Sheet B	1	2	3	4	5	6	7	8	Final

Sheet C	1	2	3	4	5	6	7	8	Final

Sheet D	1	2	3	4	5	6	7	8	Final

==== Semifinals ====
Monday, December 21, 10:00

Sheet A	1	2	3	4	5	6	7	8	Final

Sheet D	1	2	3	4	5	6	7	8	Final

==== Bronze medal game ====
Monday, December 21, 16:00

Sheet B	1	2	3	4	5	6	7	8	Final

==== Gold medal game ====
Monday, December 21, 16:00

Sheet C	1	2	3	4	5	6	7	8	Final

=== Qualification Playoffs ===
==== Qualification Round 1 ====
Monday, December 21, 10:00

Sheet B	1	2	3	4	5	6	7	8	Final

Sheet C	1	2	3	4	5	6	7	8	Final

==== Qualification Round 2 ====
Monday, December 21, 16:00

Sheet A	1	2	3	4	5	6	7	8	Final

Sheet D	1	2	3	4	5	6	7	8	Final

=== Final standings ===
Key
Teams Advance to the 2027 World Junior Curling Championships

Place	Team
1st place, gold medalist(s)	
2nd place, silver medalist(s)	
3rd place, bronze medalist(s)	
4	
5	
6	
7	
8	
9	
10	
11	
12	
13	
14	
15	
16	
17	
18	
19	
20	
