= Robin Ahlberg =

Swedish curler (born 1999)

- Curler
- Born: 1999 (age 26–27); Stockholm, Sweden

Team
- Curling club: Sundbybergs CK, Sundbyberg, SWE
- Mixed doubles partner: Therese Westman

Curling career
- Member Association: Sweden
- World Mixed Doubles Championship: 3 (2023, 2026, 2027)
- World Mixed Championship: 1 (2022)
- World Junior Curling Championship: 1 (2020)
Medal record
Curling
Representing Sweden
World Mixed Doubles Championship
Silver medal – second place	2026 Geneva
Swedish Men's Championship
Silver medal – second place	2020 Jönköping
Silver medal – second place	2022 Härnösand
Swedish Mixed Doubles Championship
Gold medal – first place	2018 Gothenburg
Silver medal – second place	2019 Karlstad
Silver medal – second place	2021 Jönköping
Silver medal – second place	2022 Uppsala
Silver medal – second place	2023 Norrköping

Robin Ahlberg (born c. 1999) is a Swedish curler from Uppsala. He currently plays mixed doubles with partner Therese Westman.

== Career ==
=== Men's ===
In 2020, Ahlberg qualified for the World Junior Curling Championships, playing third on the Swedish team skipped by Daniel Magnusson. To qualify, the team finished an undefeated 10–0 at the 2019 World Junior-B Championships. With teammates Anton Regosa and Sebastian Jones, the team finished the round robin with a 5–4 record, however, missed the playoffs on the draw shot challenge tiebreaker. Also during the 2019–20 season, Team Magnusson found success on the men's tour, winning the WCT Latvian International Challenger and finishing second at the 2020 Swedish Men's Curling Championship to Niklas Edin. Two seasons later, Team Magnusson again lost in the final of the Swedish championship, this time to the junior Axel Landelius rink.

=== Mixed doubles ===
Beginning in the 2018–19 season, Ahlberg started playing mixed doubles with Therese Westman. The pair had previously teamed up at the 2018 Swedish Mixed Doubles Curling Championship where they claimed the national title. In their first full season together, the pair represented Sweden in the first leg of the 2018–19 Curling World Cup, finishing 2–4. They also finished runner-up at the 2019 Swedish championship, losing in the final to Anna Hasselborg and Oskar Eriksson who went on to win the 2019 World Mixed Doubles Curling Championship. The following season, the pair found more success, reaching the playoffs in eight of their twelve events and losing the final of the International Mixed Doubles St. Gallen.

After back-to-back silver medals in 2021 and 2022 at the Swedish championship, Ahlberg and Westman had their best season yet during the 2022–23 season. In January, the pair won their first World Curling Tour event, defeating Olympic silver medalists Kristin Skaslien and Magnus Nedregotten in the final of the Gothenburg Mixed Doubles Cup. Despite losing in the final of the Swedish championships for a third year in a row, Ahlberg and Westman won the qualifier for the 2023 World Mixed Doubles Curling Championship in a rematch against Rebecka Thunman and Daniel Magnusson. Representing Sweden at the World Championship, the pair had mixed results, finishing fifth in their group with a 4–5 record. The 2023–24 season was less successful for the team. While they did reach the final of the Mixed Doubles Gstaad, they were unable to medal at the Swedish championship and finished 1–3 at the world qualifier.

In November 2025, Ahlberg and Westman won their second tour event at the Mixed Doubles Łódź, defeating the Norwegian pair of Eilin Kjærland and Mathias Brænden in the final. They also reached two other finals during the 2025–26 season at the Mixed Doubles Karlstad and Madtown Doubledown, losing to Tori Koana / Go Aoki and Katie Ford / Oliver Campbell respectively. In the new year, the pair were appointed to represent Sweden at the 2026 World Mixed Doubles Curling Championship.

=== Mixed ===
Ahlberg played fourth on the Swedish team that competed in the 2022 World Mixed Curling Championship. With teammates Therese Westman, Johannes Patz and Mikaela Altebro, the team finished with an 8–0 record in the round robin, securing the second seed in the playoff round. They then beat Norway in the quarterfinals before suffering consecutive losses to Scotland and Switzerland in the semifinal and bronze medal game, finishing fourth.

== Personal life ==
Ahlberg is in a relationship with mixed doubles partner Therese Westman.

== Teams ==
Season	Skip	Third	Second	Lead
2015–16	Henrik Shadman	Ivar Veszelei	Johan Järvenson	Robin Ahlberg
2016–17	Robin Ahlberg	Johan Järvenson	Ivar Veszelei	Henrik Shadman
2017–18	Ludvig Köhn (Fourth)	Robin Ahlberg (Skip)	Rasmus Israelsson	Arvid Norin
2018–19	Ludvig Köhn	Robin Ahlberg	Rasmus Israelsson	Arvid Norin
2019–20	Daniel Magnusson	Robin Ahlberg	Anton Regosa	Sebastian Jones
2020–21	Daniel Magnusson	Rasmus Israelsson	Robin Ahlberg	Anton Regosa
2021–22	Daniel Magnusson	Rasmus Israelsson	Robin Ahlberg	Anton Regosa
2022–23	Daniel Magnusson	Robin Ahlberg	Anton Regosa	Axel Yseus
2024–25	Sebastian Kraupp (Fourth)	Daniel Magnusson (Skip)	Anton Regosa	Robin Ahlberg
