= Therese Westman =

Swedish curler (born 1996)

- Curler
- Born: April 22, 1997 (age 29); Nacka Nacka, SWE

Team
- Curling club: Sundbybergs CK, Sundbyberg, SWE
- Mixed doubles partner: Robin Ahlberg

Curling career
- Member Association: Sweden
- World Mixed Doubles Championship: 3 (2023, 2026, 2027)
- World Mixed Championship: 1 (2022)
- European Championship: 1 (2022)
- World Junior Curling Championship: 1 (2016)
Medal record
Curling
Representing Sweden
World Mixed Doubles Championship
Silver medal – second place	2026 Geneva
Swedish Women's Championship
Silver medal – second place	2018 Skellefteå
Bronze medal – third place	2019 Jönköping
Swedish Mixed Doubles Championship
Gold medal – first place	2018 Gothenburg
Silver medal – second place	2019 Karlstad
Silver medal – second place	2021 Jönköping
Silver medal – second place	2022 Uppsala
Silver medal – second place	2023 Norrköping

Therese Westman (born April 22, 1997) is a Swedish curler from Sundbyberg. She currently plays mixed doubles with partner Robin Ahlberg.

== Career ==
=== Women's ===
In 2016, Westman qualified for the World Junior Curling Championships, skipping her own team of Sarah Pengel, Maria Larsson, Mikaela Altebro and Johanna Heldin. At the event, the team finished the round robin with a 5–4 record, qualifying for a tiebreaker. They then lost 10–4 in the tiebreaker to Hungary's Dorottya Palancsa, eliminating them from contention.

Out of juniors, Westman began playing third for her mother Anette Norberg with Heldin and Pengel joining the team at front end. During their two seasons together, the team found success at the Swedish Women's Curling Championship, earning silver in 2018 and bronze in 2019. They also reached the semifinals of two tour events, the 2017 Paf Masters Tour and Following the 2018–19 season, Westman became solely focused on the mixed doubles discipline with partner Robin Ahlberg.

During the 2022–23 season, Westman spared for the Anna Hasselborg rink while third Sara McManus was on maternity leave. Playing lead for the team, they won the Sundbyberg Open and reached the quarterfinals of the 2022 Masters Grand Slam event. She was also the team's alternate at the 2022 European Curling Championships where they finished 5–4, just missing the playoffs.

=== Mixed doubles ===
Beginning in the 2018–19 season, Westman started playing mixed doubles with Robin Ahlberg. The pair had previously teamed up at the 2018 Swedish Mixed Doubles Curling Championship where they claimed the national title. In their first full season together, the pair represented Sweden in the first leg of the 2018–19 Curling World Cup, finishing 2–4. They also finished runner-up at the 2019 Swedish championship, losing in the final to Anna Hasselborg and Oskar Eriksson who went on to win the 2019 World Mixed Doubles Curling Championship. The following season, the pair began playing mixed doubles exclusively and found more success, reaching the playoffs in eight of their twelve events and losing the final of the International Mixed Doubles St. Gallen.

After back-to-back silver medals in 2021 and 2022 at the Swedish championship, Westman and Ahlberg had their best season yet during the 2022–23 season. In January, the pair won their first World Curling Tour event, defeating Olympic silver medalists Kristin Skaslien and Magnus Nedregotten in the final of the Gothenburg Mixed Doubles Cup. Despite losing in the final of the Swedish championships for a third year in a row, Westman and Ahlberg won the qualifier for the 2023 World Mixed Doubles Curling Championship in a rematch against Rebecka Thunman and Daniel Magnusson. Representing Sweden at the World Championship, the pair had mixed results, finishing fifth in their group with a 4–5 record. The 2023–24 season was less successful for the team. While they did reach the final of the Mixed Doubles Gstaad, they were unable to medal at the Swedish championship and finished 1–3 at the world qualifier.

In November 2025, Westman and Ahlberg won their second tour event at the Mixed Doubles Łódź, defeating the Norwegian pair of Eilin Kjærland and Mathias Brænden in the final. They also reached two other finals during the 2025–26 season at the Mixed Doubles Karlstad and Madtown Doubledown, losing to Tori Koana / Go Aoki and Katie Ford / Oliver Campbell respectively. In the new year, the pair were appointed to represent Sweden at the 2026 World Mixed Doubles Curling Championship.

=== Mixed ===
Westman skipped the Swedish team that competed in the 2022 World Mixed Curling Championship. With teammates Robin Ahlberg, Johannes Patz and Mikaela Altebro, Westman led her team to an 8–0 record in the round robin, securing the second seed in the playoff round. The team then beat Norway in the quarterfinals before suffering consecutive losses to Scotland and Switzerland in the semifinal and bronze medal game, finishing fourth.

== Personal life ==
Westman is the daughter of 2006 and 2010 Olympic gold medalist Anette Norberg. She is in a relationship with mixed doubles partner Robin Ahlberg.

== Teams ==
Season	Skip	Third	Second	Lead
2013–14	Therese Westman	Maria Larsson	Mikaela Altebro	Rebecka Thunman
2014–15	Anette Norberg	Cathrine Lindahl	Åsa Linderholm	Therese Westman
2015–16	Therese Westman	Sarah Pengel	Maria Larsson	Mikaela Altebro
2016–17	Therese Westman	Tilde Vermelin	Maria Larsson	Mikaela Altebro
2017–18	Anette Norberg	Therese Westman	Johanna Heldin	Sarah Pengel
2018–19	Anette Norberg	Therese Westman	Johanna Heldin	Tilde Vermelin
