= List of teams in the 2024–25 curling season =

This is a list of the top men's, women's and mixed doubles curling teams of the 2024–25 curling season, sorted by their end of season World Curling ranking.

This list shows the team lineups, their playdown record (provincial or regional championships, national or continental qualifiers), national championship record, world championship record, Grand Slam record (men's and women's only), and other tour events won, plus their end of season World Curling ranking points.

== Men's ==
Team					Playdown record	National championship record	World championship record	Grand Slam record					Other event wins	World Curling team ranking	Points
Skip	Third	Second	Lead	Club/locale	Playdown record	National championship record	World championship record	TC	CO	Nat'l	Mast.	PC	Other event wins	World Curling team ranking	Points
Bruce Mouat	Grant Hardie	Bobby Lammie	Hammy McMillan Jr.	Curl Edinburgh, Edinburgh, Scotland	(silver) 9–2 (ECC)	(silver) 8–2 (SCO)	(gold) 11–4	C	C	C	SF	C	Baden Masters, Euro Super Series	1st	532.250
Benoît Schwarz-van Berkel	Yannick Schwaller (skip)	Sven Michel	Pablo Lachat-Couchepin	CC Genève, Geneva, Switzerland	(gold) 3–2 (EQF); 4th 6–5 (ECC)	(gold) 9–2 (SUI)	(silver) 10–4	QF	SF	DNP	QF	F	Shorty Jenkins Classic, Stu Sells Oakville Tankard Western Showdown	2nd	388.250
Brad Jacobs	Marc Kennedy	Brett Gallant	Ben Hebert	The Glencoe Club, Calgary, Alberta	–	(gold) 12–1 (Brier)	(bronze) 12–2	QF	QF	F	F	SF	Penticton Curling Classic	3rd	367.750
Matt Dunstone	Colton Lott (Note: Team Dunstone began the season with B. J. Neufeld at third and Lott at second. On December 5 it was announced Neufeld had left the team.)	E. J. Harnden (Note: E. J. Harnden replaced B. J. Neufeld on the team for the Red Deer Curling Classic Following Neufeld's December 5 departure from the team, Harden joined the team at second, with Lott moving from second to third.)	Ryan Harnden	Fort Rouge CC, Winnipeg, Manitoba	–	(silver) 9–2 (Brier)	–	SF	QF	Q	SF	SF	Astec Safety Challenge, Henderson Metal Fall Classic, Red Deer Curling Classic	4th	353.250
Ross Whyte	Robin Brydone	Duncan McFadzean	Euan Kyle	The Peak (Stirling), Stirling, Scotland	–	(gold) 9–1 (SCO)	–	QF	QF	SF	C	Q	–	5th	310.000
Mike McEwen	Colton Flasch	Kevin Marsh	Dan Marsh	Nutana CC, Saskatoon, Saskatchewan	–	5th 7–3 (Brier)	–	SF	Q	SF	Q	QF	ATB Okotoks Classic, Saville Shootout, PointsBet Invitational	6th	292.000
Brad Gushue	Mark Nichols	Brendan Bottcher (Note: Team Gushue began the season with E. J. Harnden at second. On October 15, it was announced that Harnden would be replaced by Bottcher.)	Geoff Walker	St. John's CC, St. John's, Newfoundland and Labrador	4th 7–2 (PCCC)	(bronze) 8–3 (Brier)	–	F	F	QF	Q	Q	–	7th	274.250
Marc Muskatewitz	Benjamin Kapp	Felix Messenzehl	Johannes Scheuerl	CC Füssen, Füssen, Germany	(gold) 3–2 (EQF); (gold) 8–3 (ECC)	(gold) 6–0 (GER)	8th 5–7	T2	DNP	QF	QF	Q	Karuizawa International	8th	270.750
Philipp Hösli	Marco Hösli (skip)	Simon Gloor	Justin Hausherr	CC Glarus, Glarus, Switzerland	–	(silver) 7–3 (SUI)	–	T2	Q	Q	Q	Q	Oslo Cup, Grand Prix Bern Inter	9th	245.750
John Epping	Jacob Horgan	Tanner Horgan	Ian McMillan	Northern Credit Union CC, Sudbury, Ontario	(gold) 4–0 (NO)	7th 6–2 (Brier)	–	DNP	DNP	DNP	Q	QF	Stu Sells Toronto Tankard, Ed Werenich Golden Wrench Classic, Stu Sells Collingwood Classic, KW Fall Classic, Duluth Cash Spiel	10th	238.750
Joël Retornaz	Amos Mosaner	Sebastiano Arman	Mattia Giovanella	Trentino Curling Cembra, Cembra, Italy	6th 6–3 (ECC)	(gold) 5–1 (ITA)	10th 5–7	Q	SF	QF	Q	Q	–	11th	216.000
Korey Dropkin	Andrew Stopera	Mark Fenner	Thomas Howell	(United States) Duluth CC, Duluth, Minnesota	–	(gold) 7–3 (USA)	11th 4–8	Q	DNP	DNP	QF	Q	Martensville International, Saville Grand Prix	12th	215.500
Niklas Edin	Oskar Eriksson	Rasmus Wranå	Christoffer Sundgren	Karlstads CK, Karlstad, Sweden	5th 6–3 (ECC)	–	5th 8–5	Q	QF	Q	QF	DNP	–	13th	214.875
Magnus Ramsfjell	Martin Sesaker	Bendik Ramsfjell	Gaute Nepstad	Trondheim CK, Trondheim, Norway	(bronze) 7–4 (ECC)	(silver) 6–1 (NOR)	6th 7–6	T2	DNP	Q	Q	DNP	–	14th	199.750
Rylan Kleiter	Joshua Mattern	Matthew Hall	Trevor Johnson	Nutana CC, Saskatoon, Saskatchewan	(gold) 8–3 (SK)	13th 3–5 (Brier)	–	T2	DNP	DNP	Q	DNP	Tour Challenge Tier 2, Speedy Creek Shootout	15th	186.625
Xu Xiaoming	Fei Xueqing	Wang Zhi Yu	Li Zhichao	Beijing, China	(gold) 6–3 (PCCC)		4th 9–6	DNP	DNP	DNP	DNP	DNP	Prestige Hotels & Resorts Curling Classic, Belgium Men's Challenge	16th	180.250
Michael Brunner	Anthony Petoud	Romano Keller-Meier	Andreas Gerlach	CC Bern Zähringer, Bern, Switzerland	–	4th 4–4 (SUI)	–	Q	Q	Q	DNP	DNP	Take-Out Trophy	17th	177.625
James Craik	Mark Watt	Angus Bryce	Blair Haswell	Forfar Indoor Sports, Forfar, Scotland	–	(bronze) 6–3 (SCO)	–	QF	Q	Q	DNP	DNP	Sun City Cup	18th	166.625
Jordon McDonald	Dallas Burgess	Elias Huminicki	Cameron Olafson	Assiniboine Memorial CC, Winnipeg, Manitoba	T5th 4–3 (MB)	–	–	DNP	DNP	DNP	Q	DNP	U25 NextGen Classic, MCT Curling Cup	19th	162.000
Tetsuro Shimizu	Shinya Abe (skip)	Hayato Sato (Note: Sato and Ouchi switched positions part way through the season with Sato throwing second for both the Pan Continentals and Japan Championships)	Haruto Ouchi	Hokkaido Consadole Sapporo, Kitami, Japan	(silver) 5–4 (PCCC)	(silver) 6–2 (JPN)	–	DNP	DNP	DNP	DNP	DNP	Wakkanai Midori Challenge Cup, Advics Cup, Abbotsford Curling Classic	20th	151.000
John Shuster	Chris Plys	Colin Hufman	Matt Hamilton (Note: Replaced by John Landsteiner at the Tour Challenge)	(United States) Duluth CC, Duluth, Minnesota	(bronze) 7–2 (PCCC)	(bronze) 6–3 (USA)	–	Q	Q	QF	DNP	DNP	–	21st	150.750
Daniel Casper	Luc Violette	Ben Richardson	Aidan Oldenburg	(United States) Chaska CC, Chaska, Minnesota	–	(silver) 8–1 (USA)	–	T2	DNP	DNP	DNP	DNP	St. Paul Cashspiel	22nd	147.875
Reid Carruthers	B. J. Neufeld (Note: Team Carruthers began the season with Schenider at third, Derek Samagalski at second and Njegovan at lead. On November 9, Samagalski left the team and was replaced by Kyle Doering. In January, the team added B. J. Neufeld at third. As a result, Schneider moved to second, and Doering was made the team's fifth.)	Catlin Schneider	Connor Njegovan	Granite CC, Winnipeg, Manitoba	(gold) 8–1 (MB)	4th 7–3 (Brier)	–	Q	Q	Q	DNP	DNP	–	23rd	145.375
Riku Yanagisawa	Tsuyoshi Yamaguchi (Note: Yamaguchi skipped the team and threw third rocks at the World Championships)	Takeru Yamamoto	Satoshi Koizumi	Karuizawa CC, Karuizawa, Japan	–	(gold) 7–1 (JPN)	5–7 9th	T2	DNP	DNP	DNP	DNP	–	24th	140.813
Kyle Waddell	Craig Waddell	Mark Taylor	Gavin Barr	Lanarkshire Ice Rink, Hamilton, Scotland	–	6th 3–5 (SCO)	–	T2	DNP	DNP	DNP	DNP	–	25th	139.375
Sam Mooibroek	Ryan Wiebe	Scott Mitchell	Nathan Steele	Whitby CC, Whitby, Ontario	(gold) 5–0 (ON)	8th 4–4 (Brier)	–	T2	DNP	DNP	DNP	DNP	Stu Sells Brantford Nissan Classic	26th	136.750
Lukáš Klíma	Marek Černovský	Martin Jurík	Lukáš Klípa	CC Zbraslav & CC Dion, Prague, Czech Republic	8th 2–7 (ECC)	(gold) 8–0 (CZE)	7th 6–6	DNP	DNP	DNP	DNP	DNP	Swiss Cup Basel	27th	130.125
Kevin Koe	Aaron Sluchinski (Note: Team Koe began the season with Tardi at third and Jacques Gauthier at second, but Gauthier left the team in September. The team then played two events (including the Tour Challenge) with just three players before adding Sluchinski at third in October, bumping Tardi to second.)	Tyler Tardi	Karrick Martin	The Glencoe Club, Calgary, Alberta	(gold) 5–0 (AB)	9h 4–4 (Brier)	–	Q	Q	DNP	DNP	DNP	Western Showdown	28th	127.125
Cameron Bryce	Duncan Menzies	Luke Carson (Note: Scott Hyslop played second for the team at the Scottish Championship.)	Robin McCall	Kinross Curling, Kinross, Scotland	–	5th 5–3 (SCO)	–	Q	DNP	DNP	DNP	DNP	Aberdeen International Curling Championship, Match Town Trophy	29th	126.688
Scott Howard	Mathew Camm	Jason Camm	Tim March	Navan CC, Navan, Ontario	(silver) 5–3 (ON)	–	–	T2	DNP	DNP	DNP	DNP	–	30th	121.750
Takumi Maeda	Asei Nakahara	Hiroki Maeda	Uryu Kamikawa	Loco Solare, Kitami, Japan	–	(silver) 4–5 (JPN)	–	DNP	DNP	DNP	DNP	DNP	–	31st	110.750
Braden Calvert	Corey Chambers	Kyle Kurz	Brendan Bilawka	Fort Rouge CC, Winnipeg, Manitoba	(silver) 6–1 (MB)	–	–	DNP	DNP	DNP	DNP	DNP	MCT Championships, Atkins Curling Supplies Classic, DeKalb Superspiel, MCT Showdown, MCT Shooutout	32nd	109.500
Yusuke Morozumi	Yuta Matsumura	Ryotaro Shukuya	Masaki Iwai	Karazuiwa, Japan	–	6th 3–4 (JPN)	–	T2	DNP	DNP	DNP	DNP	–	33rd	97.250
Marco Hefti	Jan Iseli (skip)	Max Winz	Sandro Fanchini	CC Solothurn Regio, Solothurn, Switzerland	–	6th 3–4 (SUI)	–	DNP	DNP	DNP	DNP	DNP	SwissCurling Prometteurs Cup	34th	96.813
Mark Kean	Brady Lumley	Matthew Garner	Spencer Dunlop	Woodstock CC, Woodstock, Ontario	(bronze) 5–3 (ON)	–	–	DNP	DNP	DNP	DNP	DNP	–	35th	95.500
Owen Purcell	Luke Saunders	Scott Saccary	Ryan Abraham	Halifax CC, Halifax, Nova Scotia	(gold) 7–1 (NS)	6th 5–4 (Brier)	–	T2	DNP	DNP	DNP	DNP	–	36th	92.625
Dustin Kalthoff	Josh Heidt	Sam Wills (Note: Wills left the team in mid-January for personal reasons. The team played with three players at the SaskTel Tankard.)	Mat Ring	Nutana CC, Saskatoon, Saskatchewan	(bronze) 6–4 (SK)	–	–	DNP	DNP	DNP	DNP	DNP	Original 16 Tour Bonspiel	37th	91.625
Yves Stocker (Note: Jan Hess skipped the team at the Tour Challenge and threw last stones at the Swiss Championship, replacing Stocker at both events.)	Kim Schwaller (Note: Schwaller skipped the team, but threw third stones at the Swiss Championship)	Felix Eberhard	Tom Winkelhausen	CC Oberwallis, Brig-Glis, Switzerland	–	(bronze) 5–4 (SUI)	–	T2	DNP	DNP	DNP	DNP	–	38th	88.000
Ethan Sampson	Coleman Thurston	Jacob Zeman	Marius Kleinas	(United States) Chaska, Minnesota	–	5th 3–5 (USA)	–	DNP	DNP	DNP	DNP	DNP	Mother Club Fall Curling Classic	39th	86.813
Orrin Carson	Logan Carson (Note: Hamish Gallacher played third for the team at the Scottish championship)	Archie Hyslop (Note: Hyslop played lead for the team at the Scottish championship)	Charlie Gibb (Note: Gibb played second for the team at the Scottish championship)	Dumfries Ice Bowl, Dumfries, Scotland	–	(bronze) 5–4 (SCO)	–	DNP	DNP	DNP	DNP	DNP	Mercure Perth Masters	40th	86.188
Lukas Høstmælingen	Grunde Buraas (Note: Buraas did not play at the 2025 World Junior Curling Championships. Nordbye played third, and Eskil Eriksenr played at lead.)	Magnus Lillebø	Tinius Haslev Nordbye	Lillehammer CK, Lillehammer, Norway	–	(gold) 7–0 (NOR)	–	DNP	DNP	DNP	DNP	DNP	World University Games	41st	85.875
Fredrik Nyman	Patric Mabergs	Simon Olofsson	Johannes Patz	Sollefteå CK, Sollefteå, Sweden	–	(bronze) 3–2 (SWE)	–	DNP	DNP	DNP	DNP	DNP	Tallinn Mens Challenger, Prague Classic	42nd	85.250
Félix Asselin	Jean-Michel Ménard (skip)	Martin Crête	Jean-François Trépanier	Glenmore CC, Dollard-des-Ormeaux / Curling des Collines, Chelsea / CC Etchemin, Saint-Romuald / CC Valleyfield, Salaberry-de-Valleyfield, Quebec	(gold) 6–1 (QC)	10th 4–4 (Brier)	–	DNP	DNP	DNP	DNP	DNP	Classic Baie d'Urfe	43rd	91.063
Chase Sinnett (Note: At the 2025 US Championships, Strouse threw fourth rocks, Tuma third, and Sinnett second, while Sinnett continued to skip the team.)	Samuel Strouse	Kevin Tuma	Connor Kauffman	Minneapolis, Minnesota, United States	–	4th 4–5 (USA)	–	DNP	DNP	DNP	DNP	DNP	Icebreaker Challenge	44th	82.500
Jayden King	Dylan Niepage	Owen Henry	Daniel Del Conte	London CC, London, Ontario	T5th 3–3 (ON)	–	–	DNP	DNP	DNP	DNP	DNP	–	45th	82.250
Sixten Totzek	Joshua Sutor	Magnus Sutor	Jan-Luca Häg	CC Füssen, Füssen, Germany	(silver) 2–3 (EQF)	(silver) 4–3 (GER)	–	DNP	DNP	DNP	DNP	DNP	Alberta Curling Series Major	46th	81.625
Evan van Amsterdam	Jason Ginter	Sterling Middleton	Parker Konschuh	Saville Community SC, Edmonton, Alberta	(silver) 5–3 (AB)	–	–	DNP	DNP	DNP	DNP	DNP	Crestwood Platinum Anniversary Showdown	47th	81.125
Brent Pierce	Matthew Blandford	Cody Johnston	Nicholas Umbach	Royal City CC, New Westminster, British Columbia	T7th 2–3 (BC)	–	–	DNP	DNP	DNP	DNP	DNP	–	48th	78.750
Kelly Knapp	Brennen Jones	Mike Armstrong	Trent Knapp	Highland CC, Regina, Saskatchewan	4th 5–4 (SK)	–	–	DNP	DNP	DNP	DNP	DNP	Martensville SaskTour Series, Regina Highland SaskTour Spiel, Scott Comfort Re/Max Blue Chip Bonspiel, Sask Curling Tour – Yorkton, S3 Group Curling Stadium Series	49th	71.813
Scott Dunnam	Cody Clouser	Lance Wheeler	Andrew Dunnam	Philadelphia, United States	–	6th 2–5 (USA)	–	DNP	DNP	DNP	DNP	DNP	–	50th	71.500

== Women's ==
Team					Playdown record	National championship record	World championship record	Grand Slam record					Other event wins	World Curling team ranking	Points
Skip	Third	Second	Lead	Club/locale	Playdown record	National championship record	World championship record	TC	CO	Nat'l	Mast.	PC	Other event wins	World Curling team ranking	Points
Rachel Homan	Tracy Fleury	Emma Miskew	Sarah Wilkes	Ottawa CC, Ottawa, Ontario	(gold) 9–0 (PCCC)	(gold) 11–0 (STOH)	(gold) 13–2	F	C	C	F	F	Shorty Jenkins Classic, PointsBet Invitational	1st	510.000
Alina Pätz	Silvana Tirinzoni (skip)	Selina Witschonke	Carole Howald	CC Aarau, Aarau, Switzerland	(gold) 4–0 (EQF); (gold) 11–0 (ECC)	(bronze) 5–2 (SUI)	(silver) 12–2	Q	F	Q	QF	C	Women's Masters Basel, International Bernese Ladies Cup	2nd	394.250
Anna Hasselborg	Sara McManus	Agnes Knochenhauer	Sofia Mabergs	Sundbybergs CK, Sundbyberg, Sweden	(gold) 4–0 (EQF); (silver) 8–3 (ECC)	—	5th 9–4	Q	DNP	F	C	SF	Oslo Cup	3rd	341.000
Kim Eun-jung	Kim Kyeong-ae	Kim Cho-hi	Kim Seon-yeong	Gangneung City Hall, Gangneung, South Korea	–	(bronze) 5–4 (KOR)	–	QF	SF	SF	SF	SF	Stu Sells Toronto Tankard, Gangneung Invitational	4th	313.750
Kerri Einarson	Val Sweeting	Karlee Burgess (Note: The team's regular second Shannon Birchard missed nearly the entire season due to a knee injury. She was replaced by Burgess in January. Birchard was replaced at the Tour Challenge by Dawn McEwen, at the Canadian Open and Saville Grand Prix by Joanne Courtney, and at the National by Brittany Tran.)	Krysten Karwacki	Gimli CC, Gimli, Manitoba	–	(silver) 8–4 (STOH)	–	C	QF	SF	QF	Q	Saville Grand Prix	5th	303.750
Gim Eun-ji	Kim Min-ji	Kim Su-ji	Seol Ye-eun	Gyeonggi Province, Uijeongbu, South Korea	(silver) 6–3 (PCCC)	(gold) 8–2 (KOR)	4th 10–4	QF	Q	Q	Q	Q	Autumn Gold Curling Classic, Alberta Curling Series Major, Asian Winter Games	6th	262.250
Satsuki Fujisawa	Chinami Yoshida	Yumi Suzuki	Yurika Yoshida	Loco Solare, Kitami, Japan	–	(bronze) 6–2 (JPN)	–	SF	QF	QF	QF	Q	–	7th	258.625
Sayaka Yoshimura	Yuna Kotani	Kaho Onodera	Anna Ohmiya	Fortius, Sapporo, Japan	–	(gold) 7–1 (JPN)	9th 4–8	T2	Q	QF	DNP	QF	Karuizawa International, Advics Cup	8th	256.250
Momoha Tabata	Miku Nihira (skip)	Sae Yamamoto	Mikoto Nakajima	Hokkaido Bank, Sapporo, Japan		(silver) 6–3 (JPN)	–	T2	DNP	Q	QF	Q	Red Deer Curling Classic, Saville Shootout, Argo Graphics Cup, Saville U25 Challenge, Ice Gold Cup	9th	249.125
Ha Seung-youn	Kim Hye-rin	Yang Tae-i	Kim Su-jin	Chuncheon City Hall, Chuncheon, South Korea	–	(silver) 7–2 (KOR)	–	T2	SF	QF	Q	QF	Curling1spoon Elite 8	10th	244.250
Xenia Schwaller	Selina Gafner	Fabienne Rieder	Selina Rychiger	Grasshopper Club Zurich, Zurich, Switzerland	(silver) 0–4 (EQF)	(silver) 6–3 (SUI)	–	Q	Q	Q	Q	Q	Western Showdown, Stu Sells Oakville Tankard, Perth Masters	11th	244.000
Isabella Wranå	Almida de Val	Maria Larsson	Linda Stenlund	Sundbybergs CK, Sundbyberg, Sweden	–	–	–	QF	Q	Q	SF	Q	Sun City Cup, WCT Take-Out Trophy	12th	208.000
Kayla Skrlik	Margot Flemming	Ashton Skrlik	Geri-Lynn Ramsay	Garrison CC, Calgary, Alberta	(gold) 6–1 (AB)	4th 7–4 (STOH)	–	T2	DNP	DNP	Q	DNP	Martensville International, Ladies Alberta Open	13th	200.625
Wang Rui	Han Yu	Dong Ziqi	Jiang Jiayi	Beijing, China	(bronze) 5–4 (PCCC)		(bronze) 9–6	DNP	DNP	DNP	DNP	DNP	–	14th	195.375
Christina Black	Jill Brothers	Jennifer Baxter (Note: Marlee Powers spared for Baxter in the 2025 Scotties playoffs following the death of Baxter's father.)	Karlee Everist	Halifax CC, Halifax, Nova Scotia	(gold) 7–0 (NS)	(bronze) 8–4 (STOH)	–	T2	DNP	QF	DNP	DNP	Tour Challenge Tier 2, Stu Sells Brantford Nissan Classic, Dave Jones Mayflower Cashspiel, Steele Cup Cash	15th	184.000
Stefania Constantini	Giulia Zardini Lacedelli (Note: Team Constatini employed a 4-player rotation. Lacedelli threw third, Mathis second and Romei lead at the National Slam, European and World Championships; Lacedelli was third, Mathis second and Lo Deserto lead at the Italian Championship and Canadian Open; Mathis threw third, Romei second and Lacedelli lead at the Tour Championship; Mathis threw third, Lo Deserto second and Romei lead at the Masters)	Elena Mathis	Angela Romei; Marta Lo Deserto	CC Dolomiti, Cortina d'Ampezzo, Italy	4th 6–5 (ECC)	(gold) 6–0 (ITA)	10th 4–8	QF	QF	Q	Q	DNP	–	16th	181.750
Ikue Kitazawa	Seina Nakajima	Ami Enami	Minori Suzuki	Chubu Electric Power, Nagano, Japan	–	7th 2–2 (JPN)	–	T2	Q	DNP	Q	DNP	Wakkanai Midori Challenge Cup	17th	172.750
Rebecca Morrison	Jennifer Dodds	Sophie Sinclair	Sophie Jackson (skip)	Curl Aberdeen, Aberdeen, Scotland	(bronze) 7–4 (ECC)	(silver) 5–2 (SCO)	6th 7–6	Q	DNP	DNP	DNP	DNP	Stu Sells 1824 Halifax Classic	18th	169.875
Kaitlyn Lawes (Note: Njegovan took over as skip mid-way through the Scotties)	Selena Njegovan (Note: Njegovan skipped for the team at the Canadian Open as Lawes was on maternity leave. Njegovan threw fourth, and Peterman third. Becca Hebert spared at second.)	Jocelyn Peterman	Kristin Gordon	Heather CC, Winnipeg, Manitoba	–	9th 4–4 (STOH)	–	SF	Q	Q	Q	DNP	–	19th	149.500
Kang Bo-bae	Kim Ji-soo (Note: Kim Ji-soo played lead, while Jeong Jae-hee played third at the Korean Championships and Prestige Hotels and Resorts Classic. Kim also played lead at the World University Games)	Shim Yu-jeong	Kim Min-seo (Note: Kim Min-soo played second at the Korean Championships and Prestige Hotals and Resprots Classic, and third at the World University Games)	(South Korea) Jeonbuk Province	–	6th 3–4 (KOR)	–	DNP	DNP	DNP	DNP	DNP	DeKalb Superspiel, MCT Showdown, World Junior Championships, Prestige Hotels & Resorts Curling Classic	20th	139.188
Corryn Brown	Erin Pincott	Sarah Koltun	Samantha Fisher	Kamloops CC, Kamloops, British Columbia	(gold) 8–1 (BC)	5th 6–3 (STOH)	–	T2	DNP	DNP	DNP	DNP	–	21st	135.938
Miyu Ueno	Asuka Kanai	Junko Nishimuro	Yui Ueno	SC Karuizawa Club, Karuizawa, Japan	4th 6–3 (PCCC)	8th 2–2 (JPN)	–	DNP	DNP	DNP	DNP	DNP	Mother Club Fall Curling Classic, New Year Curling in Miyota	22nd	128.250
Kate Cameron	Taylor McDonald	Brianna Cullen (Note: Allison Flaxey spared for Brianna Cullen at the 2025 provincial championship, as Cullen was competing at the 2025 Winter World University Games)	Mackenzie Elias	Heather CC, Winnipeg, Manitoba	(gold) 7–2 (MB)	11th 4–4 (STOH)	–	T2	DNP	DNP	DNP	DNP	–	23rd	127.875
Beth Peterson	Kelsey Calvert	Katherine Remillard	Melissa Gordon-Kurz	Assiniboine Memorial CC, Winnipeg, Manitoba	(silver) 7–4 (MB)	–	–	T2	DNP	DNP	DNP	DNP	MCT Championships	24th	121.875
Fay Henderson	Robyn Munro	Hailey Duff	Katie McMillan	Dumfries Ice Bowl, Dumfries, Scotland	–	(gold) 6–0 (SCO)	–	DNP	DNP	DNP	DNP	DNP	Euro Super Series	25th	120.438
Corrie Hürlimann	Marina Lörtscher	Stefanie Berset	Celine Schwizgebel	CC Zug Zug, Switzerland	–	(gold) 7–3 (SUI)	–	DNP	DNP	DNP	DNP	DNP	–	26th	120.125
Kayla MacMillan	Sarah Daniels	Lindsay Dubue	Sarah Loken	Victoria CC, Victoria, British Columbia	(silver) 7–3 (BC)	–	–	T2	DNP	DNP	DNP	DNP	–	27th	118.563
Madeleine Dupont	Mathilde Halse	Denise Dupont	My Larsen	Hvidovre CC, Hvidovre & Gentofte CC, Gentofte, Denmark	5th 5–4 (ECC)	(gold) 5–0 (DEN)	7th 5–7	T2	DNP	DNP	DNP	DNP	Sundbyberg Open, Danish Open	28th	117.750
Kristin Skaslien	Marianne Rørvik (skip)	Mille Haslev Nordbye	Eilin Kjærland	Lillehammer CK, Lillehammer, Norway	7th 4–5 (ECC)	(silver) 4–1 (NOR)	8th 5–7	DNP	DNP	DNP	DNP	DNP	–	29th	110.750
Delaney Strouse	Sarah Anderson	Sydney Mullaney	Anne O'Hara	(United States) Traverse City CC, Traverse City, Michigan	–	6th 2–5 (USA)	–	Q	DNP	DNP	DNP	DNP	–	30th	107.375
Tabitha Peterson	Cory Thiesse	Tara Peterson	Taylor Anderson-Heide	(United States) St. Paul CC, Saint Paul, Minnesota	4th 3–4 (PCCC)	(gold) 8–1 (USA)	12th 3–9	Q	DNP	DNP	DNP	DNP	–	31st	103.626
Danielle Inglis	Kira Brunton	Calissa Daly	Cassandra de Groot	Ottawa Hunt & GC, Ottawa, Ontario	(gold) 6–1 (ON)	6th 6–3 (STOH)	–	DNP	DNP	DNP	DNP	DNP	–	32nd	102.563
Dilşat Yıldız	Öznur Polat	İfayet Şafak Çalıkuşu	Berfin Şengül	Erzurum, Turkey	5th 5–4 (ECC)		11th 3–9	DNP	DNP	DNP	DNP	DNP	Tallinn Ladies Challenger	33rd	93.063
Selena Sturmay	Danielle Schmiemann	Dezaray Hawes	Paige Papley	Saville Community SC, Edmonton, Alberta	–	10th 4–4 (STOH)	–	Q	Q	DNP	DNP	DNP	Crestwood Platinum Anniversary Showdown	34th	85.376
Ashley Thevenot	Brittany Tran	Taylor Stremick	Kaylin Skinner	Nutana CC, Saskatoon, Saskatchewan	(bronze) 6–4 (SK)	–	–	T2	DNP	DNP	DNP	DNP	Icebreaker Challenge, Nutana SaskTour Women's Spiel	35th	85.250
Laurie St-Georges	Jamie Sinclair	Emily Riley	Lisa Weagle	Glenmore CC, Dollard-des-Ormeaux & CC Laval-sur-le-Lac, Laval, Quebec	(gold) 6–0 (QC)	7th 5–3 (STOH)	–	DNP	DNP	DNP	DNP	DNP	Swiss Chalet Women's Curling Stadium Spiel	36th	84.938
Krista McCarville	Andrea Kelly	Kendra Lilly (Note: Team McCarville had a five player team with Sippala, Lilly and Sarah Potts rotating their positions at the Scotties)	Ashley Sippala	Fort William CC, Thunder Bay, Ontario	(gold) 7–1 (NO)	12th 4–4 (STOH)	–	DNP	DNP	DNP	DNP	DNP	Performance Kia Charity Open, (Note: Men's event. The team's line-up was McCarville, Sippala, Jonathan Vellinga and Potts) Stu Sells Living Waters Collingwood Classic	37th	82.750
Taylor Reese-Hansen	Megan McGillivray	Kim Bonneau	Julianna Mackenzie	Victoria CC, Victoria, British Columbia	4th 5–3 (BC)	–	–	DNP	DNP	DNP	DNP	DNP	U25 NextGen Classic, Island Shootout	38th	80.813
Myla Plett	Alyssa Nedohin	Chloe Fediuk	Allie Iskiw	Saville Community SC, Edmonton, Alberta	T8th 1–3 (AB)	–	–	DNP	DNP	DNP	DNP	DNP	Canadian Junior Championships	39th	79.626
Nancy Martin	Chaelynn Stewart	Kadriana Lott	Deanna Doig	Nutana CC, Saskatoon, Saskatchewan	(gold) 8–3 (SK)	8th 5–3 (SOTH)	–	DNP	DNP	DNP	DNP	DNP	–	40th	76.376
Stephanie Schmidt (Note: Schmidt did not play in the Saskatchewan championship due to an ongoing case of pneumonia. Miller (England) threw fourth stones, Williamson threw third stones, while alternate Patty Hersikorn threw second stones.)	Sara Miller (England)	Ashley Williamson	Michelle Englot (skip)	Highland CC, Regina, Saskatchewan	5th 3–5 (SK)	–	–	DNP	DNP	DNP	DNP	DNP	–	41st	73.813
Chelsea Carey	Karlee Burgess (Note: Burgess left the team on January 3 to join Team Einarson. The team did not play following her departure.)	Emily Zacharias	Lauren Lenentine	St. Vital CC, Winnipeg, Manitoba	–	– (Note: The team had originally been a pre-qualifier for the Tournament of Hearts, but no longer qualified following the departure of Burgess.)	–	Q	QF	Q	DNP	DNP	–	42nd	71.813
Elizabeth Cousins	Annmarie Dubberstein	Allison Howell	Elizabeth Janiak	Nashua, New Hampshire, United States	–	(silver) 7–3 (USA)	–	DNP	DNP	DNP	DNP	DNP	–	43rd	71.000
Serena Gray-Withers	Catherine Clifford	Lindsey Burgess	Zoe Cinnamon	Saville Community SC, Edmonton, Alberta	–	–	–	T2	DNP	DNP	DNP	DNP	Alberta Curling Series Team Event 2, SGI Canada Best of the West	44th	69.688
Chelsea Brandwood	Lauren Horton	Brenda Champman	Keira McLaughlin	Niagara Falls CC, Niagara Falls, Ontario	(silver) 6–3 (ON)	–	–	DNP	DNP	DNP	DNP	DNP	–	45th	69.625
Yuina Miura	Ai Matsunaga	Yuuna Sakuma	Yuuna Takahashi	Nayoro, Japan	–	–	–	DNP	DNP	DNP	DNP	DNP	Winter University Games (Note: The team at the University Games consisted of Miura, Kohane Tsuruga, Eri Ogihara, Rin Suzuki and Matsunaga.)	46th	69.063
Penny Barker	Lindsay Bertsch	Taryn Schachtel	Danielle Sicinski	Moose Jaw CC, Moose Jaw, Saskatchewan	4th 5–4 (SK)	–	–	DNP	DNP	DNP	DNP	DNP	Moose Jaw SaskTour Spiel, Sutherland SaskTour Spiel	47th	68.875
Nicky Kaufman	Karynn Flory	Kim Curtin	Krysta Hilker	Thistle CC, Edmonton, Alberta	(silver) 5–3 (AB)	–	–	DNP	DNP	DNP	DNP	DNP	–	48th	68.688
Christine McMakin	Miranda Scheel	Jenna Burchesky	Rebecca Rodgers	Fargo, North Dakota, United States	–	(bronze) 6–3 (USA)	–	DNP	DNP	DNP	DNP	DNP	–	49th	61.063
Kristy Watling	Laura Burtnyk	Emily Deschenes	Sarah Pyke	East St. Paul CC, East St. Paul, Manitoba	5th 5–3 (MB)	–	–	DNP	DNP	DNP	DNP	DNP	RME Women's Winnipeg Regional Qualifier	50th	59.813

== Mixed doubles ==
Team			Playdown record	National championship record	World championship record	Event wins	World Curling team ranking	Points
Female	Male	Club/locale	Playdown record	National championship record	World championship record	Event wins	World Curling team ranking	Points
Marie Kaldvee	Harri Lill	Tallinn, Estonia	–	(gold) 6–0 (EST)	4th 7–5	Super Series: Calgary, Madtown Doubledown, Super Series: Fredericton, Łódź Masters, Players' Championship	1st	229.750
Tahli Gill	Dean Hewitt	Brisbane, Australia	–	(gold) 6–0 (AUS)	(bronze) 9–2	Super Series: Vernon, Saville Classic, Super Series: Saskatchewan, Jamaica Cup, Hvidovre Cup, Stadler European Mixed Doubles Invitational	2nd	190.500
Jennifer Dodds	Bruce Mouat	Stirling, Scotland		7th 3–2 (SCO)	(silver) 9–3	Gothenburg Cup, Mixed Doubles Gstaad	3rd	183.188
Kristin Skaslien	Magnus Nedregotten	Lillehammer CK, Lillehammer, Norway	–	(gold) 6–0 (NOR)	8th 6–3	Tallinn Masters	4th	163.500
Jocelyn Peterman	Brett Gallant	The Glencoe Club, Calgary, Alberta	(gold) 10–0 (CMDCOT)	10th 5–3 (CAN)	6th 7–4	Rocky Mountain Classic	5th	160.500
Tori Koana	Go Aoki	Yamanashi / Hokkaido, Japan	–	(silver) 9–1 (JPN)	–	Aly Jenkins Memorial, Super Series: Winnipeg, Asian Winter Games	6th	129.626
Kadriana Lott	Colton Lott	Gimli CC, Gimli, Manitoba	4–3 7th (CMDCOT)	(gold) 9–1 (CAN)	–	Enn Bros Classic	7th	126.000
Laura Walker	Kirk Muyres	Saville SC, Edmonton, Alberta & Muenster CC, Muenster, Saskatchewan	4–3 8th (CMDCOT)	5th 7–1 (CAN)	–	–	8th	125.000
Chiaki Matsumura	Yasumasa Tanida	Nagano / Hokkaido, Japan	–	(gold) 9–2 (JPN)	13th 5–4	Northern Credit Union Open	9th	121.378
Cory Thiesse	Korey Dropkin	Duluth, Minnesota, United States	–	(gold) 11–1 (USA)	5th 7–4	Colorado Curling Cup	10th	119.626
Nancy Martin	Steve Laycock	Nutana CC, Saskatoon, Saskatchewan	14th 2–5 (CMDCOT)	7th 5–3 (CAN)	–	–	11th	116.376
Jennifer Jones	Brent Laing	Barrie CC, Barrie, Ontario	5th 4–4 (CMDCOT)	6th 6–2 (CAN)	–	–	12th	116.250
Rachel Homan (Note: Homan was replaced by Rachelle Brown at the Super Series Calgary event)	Brendan Bottcher	Beaumont & Spruce Grove, Alberta	(silver) 9–3 (CMDCOT)	–	–	Canadian Olympic Trials Qualifier #2, SaskTour: Sutherland	13th	115.094
Alina Pätz	Sven Michel	CC Aarau, Aarau, Switzerland	–	(gold) 8–1 (SUI)	11th 5–4	–	14th	89.814
Riley Sandham	Brendan Craig	Guelph CC, Guelph, Ontario	T5th 4–3 (ON); 15th 1–6 (CMDCOT)	14th 4–3 (CAN)	–	Ontario Tour Championship, Dixie Cup, Keith Martin Memorial, St. Marys Mixed Doubles	15th	106.250
Jenny Perret	Martin Rios	CC Glarus, Glarus, Switzerland	–	4th 4–3 (SUI)	–	–	16th	94.500
Lauren Wasylkiw	Shane Konings	Unionville CC, Unionville, Markham, Ontario	T5th 4–2 (ON)	23rd 3–4 (CAN)	–	–	17th	93.000
Marlee Powers	Luke Saunders	Halifax CC, Halifax, Nova Scotia	(gold) 9–0 (NS)	(silver) 8–3 (CAN)	–	Goldline Omnium Serviciers Financiers Richard April	18th	92.500
Martine Rønning	Mathias Brænden	Lillehamer CK, Lillehamer, Norway	–	(bronze) 5–2 (NOR)	–	–	19th	90.626
Melissa Adams	Alex Robichaud	Capital WC, Fredericton, New Brunswick	(gold) 5–1 (NB); 13th 2–5 (CMDCOT)	(bronze) 6–4 (CAN)	–	–	20th	88.750
Lisa Weagle	John Epping	Ottawa CC, Ottawa & Leaside CC, East York, Toronto, Ontario	(bronze) 6–4 (CMDCOT)	– (Note: Team declined invitation)	–	Royal Kingston Cashspiel	21st	88.250
Jessica Zheng	Victor Pietrangelo	Niagara Falls CC, Niagara Falls, Ontario	10th 3–4 (CMDCOT)	13th 4–3 (CAN)	–	–	22nd	86.002
Sophie Jackson	Duncan McFadzean	Stirling, Scotland	–	(bronze) 5–3 (SCO)	–	–	23rd	79.752
Emira Abbes (Note: Abbes was replaced by Kim Sutor at the 2025 Winter World University Games)	Klaudius Harsch	Füssen, Germany	–	(silver) 1–3 (GER)	–	Mixed Doubles Łódź	24th	79.500
Laura Engler	Kevin Wunderlin	CC Zug, Zug, Switzerland	–	(bronze) 6–2 (SUI)	–	–	25th	71.064
Sarah Anderson	Andrew Stopera	Chaska, Minnesota, United States	(gold) 8–1 (USMDOPT)	(silver) 8–5 (USA)	–	–	26th	78.000
Brittany Tran	Rylan Kleiter (Note: Kleiter was replaced by Kyler Kleibrink at the Super Series: Calgary event)	Garrison CC, Calgary, Alberta & Sutherland CC, Saskatoon, Saskatchewan	4th 7–3 (CMDCOT)	–	–	CMDCOT Qualifier #1	27th	75.813
Anna Hasselborg	Oskar Eriksson	Sundbyberg, Sweden	–	–	7th 3–3	–	28th	72.000
Anne-Sophie Gionest	Robert Desjardins	CC Chicoutimi, Chicoutimi & CC Riverbend, Alma, Quebec	16th 1–6 (CMDCOT); 4th 5–3 (QC)	22nd 3–4 (CAN)	–	Goldline Tour Finals	29th	70.250
Kim Kyeong-ae	Seong Ji-hoon	Gangneung, South Korea	–	(gold) 9–1 (KOR)	12th 4–5	–	30th	69.626
Rebecca Morrison	Bobby Lammie	Stirling, Scotland	–	8th 2–2 (SCO)	–	Mixed Doubles Bern	31st	69.064
Kira Brunton	Jacob Horgan (Note: Horgan was replaced by Wesley Forget at the Montana's North Bay event)	Northern Credit Union CC, Greater Sudbury, Ontario	–	(bronze) 8–1 (CAN)	–	Montana's North Bay	32nd	66.875
Adela Walczak	Andrzej Augustyniak	Łódź, Poland	5th 6–1 (WMDQ)	(gold) 5–0–1 (POL)	–	–	33rd	64.500
Katie Ford	Oliver Campbell	KW Granite Club, Waterloo, Ontario	(gold) 6–2 (ON)	9th 6–2 (CAN)	–	–	34th	63.252
Laura Neil	Scott McDonald	St. Thomas CC, St. Thomas, Ontario	T9th 3–3 (ON)	26th 2–5 (CAN)	–	–	35th	62.626
Julie Zelingrová	Vít Chabičovský	Dion WC, Prague, Czech Republic	–	(gold) 8–4 (CZE)	16th 3–6	Tallinn International	36th	62.126
Madison Bear	Aidan Oldenburg	Chaska, Minnesota, United States	(silver) 7–2 (USMDOPT)	(bronze) 7–4 (USA)	–	–	37th	62.000
Kelly Tremblay	Pierre Lanoue	CC Nairn, Clermont & CC Boucherville, Boucherville, Quebec	(bronze) 6–2 (QC)	16th 4–3 (CAN)	–	Goldline Royal Montreal	38th	60.376
Han Yu	Wang Zhiyu	Beijing, China	–		17th 2–7	–	39th	59.626
Megan Smith	Doug Thomson	York CC, Newmarket, Ontario	T13th 2–3 (ON)	15th 4–3 (CAN)	–	–	40th	58.876
Amanda Sluchinski	Aaron Sluchinski	Airdrie CC, Airdrie, Alberta	(gold) 5–1 (AB)	11th 5–3 (CAN)	–	Alberta Series: Event 1	41st	57.002
Isabella Wranå	Rasmus Wranå	Sundbybergs CK, Sundbyberg & Karlstads CK Karlstad, Sweden	–	–	–	Karlstad Mixed Doubles	42nd	57.000
Jaelyn Cotter	Jim Cotter	Vernon CC, Vernon, British Columbia	6th 4–3 (CMDCOT)	–	–	–	43rd	56.626
Jennifer Armstrong	Tyrel Griffith	Thistle St. Andrews CC, Saint John, New Brunswick & Kelowna CC, Kelowna, British Columbia	9th 3–4 (CMDCOT)	–	–	–	44th	56.502
Émilia Gagné (Note: Gagné was replaced by Sophie Sanscartier at the Goldline Mont-Bruno event)	Pierre-Luc Morissette	CC Jacques-Cartier, Sillery, Quebec City, Quebec	T5th 4–2 (QC)	19th 3–4 (CAN)	–	–	45th	53.000
Terri Weeks	Sam Steep	Galt CC, Cambridge, Ontario	T19th 1–4 (ON)	–	–	Palmerston Spiel	46th	52.938
Véronique Bouchard	Jean-François Charest	CC Chicoutmi, Chicoutimi, Quebec	T9th 2–3 (QC)	29th 0–7 (CAN)	–	–	47th	50.376
Therese Westman	Robin Ahlberg	Sundbybergs CK, Sundbyberg, Sweden	–	T7th 0–4 (SWE)	–	–	48th	50.252
Taylor Anderson-Heide	Ben Richardson	Chaska, Minnesota, United States	4th 5–4 (USMDOPT)	4th 6–5 (USA)	–	–	49th	49.750
Paige Papley (Note: Papley was replaced by Abby Marks at the Hack2House Alberta Curling Series Event 1)	Evan van Amsterdam	Thistle CC, Edmonton, Alberta	(bronze) 3–1 (AB); 12th 2–5 (CMDCOT)	12th 4–4 (CAN)	–	–	50th	49.438
