= 2024 Mixed Doubles Bern =

- Host city: Bern, Switzerland
- Arena: Curling Bern
- Dates: October 18–20
- Winner: (Scotland) Morrison / Lammie
- Female: Rebecca Morrison
- Male: Bobby Lammie
- Finalist: (Scotland) Dodds / Mouat

The 2024 Mixed Doubles Bern was held from October 18 to 20 at Curling Bern in Bern, Switzerland. The event was held in a triple-knockout format with a purse of 10,000 CHF. It was held as a partner event of the 2024 Mixed Doubles Gstaad which was played October 14 to 16.

In an all-Scottish final, Rebecca Morrison and Bobby Lammie defeated teammates Jennifer Dodds and Bruce Mouat 8–7 to claim the title. The two pairs traded deuces throughout the entire final except for the third end where Dodds and Mouat were forced to one. Morrison and Lammie also equalized their record with Dodds and Mouat who defeated them in the semifinal of the Mixed Doubles Gstaad days prior. To reach the final, both teams qualified through the A Event with perfect 3–0 records. In the playoffs, Morrison and Lammie beat Almida de Val and Daniel Magnusson 10–2 in the quarterfinals before knocking off the reigning Scottish champions Sophie Jackson and Duncan McFadzean 7–6 in the semifinals. For Dodds and Mouat, they won 6–5 over Jenny Perret and Martin Rios in the quarterfinals and 7–5 over Kristin Skaslien and Magnus Nedregotten in the semifinals. Switzerland's Briar Schwaller and Yannick Schwaller and Sweden's Therese Westman and Robin Ahlberg rounded out the playoff field.

== Teams ==
The teams are listed as follows:

Female	Male	Locale
Emira Abbes	Klaudius Harsch	Füssen, Germany
Kelly Danahey	Ben Allain	(United States) Denver, Colorado
Almida de Val	Daniel Magnusson	Sundbyberg & Karlstad, Sweden
Jennifer Dodds	Bruce Mouat	Stirling, Scotland
Laura Engler	Kevin Wunderlin	Zug, Switzerland
Fay Henderson	Grant Hardie	Stirling, Scotland
Jasmin Holtermann	Henrik Holtermann	Hvidovre, Denmark
Lea Hueppi	Jonas Weiss	Dübendorf, Switzerland
Sophie Jackson	Duncan McFadzean	Stirling, Scotland
Nancy Martin	Steve Laycock	(Canada) Saskatoon, Saskatchewan
Rebecca Morrison	Bobby Lammie	Stirling, Scotland
Emma Müller	Martin Seiwald	Kitzbühel, Austria
Robyn Munro	Ross Whyte	Stirling, Scotland
Alina Pätz	Sven Michel	Zürich, Switzerland
Zuzana Paulová	Tomáš Paul	Prague, Czech Republic
Jenny Perret	Martin Rios	Glarus, Switzerland
Pia-Lisa Schöll	Leonhard Angrick	Oberstdorf, Germany
Briar Schwaller	Yannick Schwaller	Solothurn, Switzerland
Kristin Skaslien	Magnus Nedregotten	Oslo, Norway
Tiina Suuripää	Markus Sipilä	Hyvinkää, Finland
Vanessa Tonoli	Wouter Gösgens	Zoetermeer, Netherlands
Therese Westman	Robin Ahlberg	Sundbyberg, Sweden
Yang Ying	Tian Jiafeng	Beijing, China
Dilşat Yıldız	Bilal Ömer Çakır	Erzurum, Turkey

== Knockout Brackets ==
=== A Event ===
First Knockout	Qualifier 1
(China) Yang / Tian	6
(Finland) Suuripää / Sipilä	8
(Finland) Suuripää / Sipilä	5
(Scotland) Jackson / McFadzean	6
(Germany) Abbes / Harsch	5
(Scotland) Jackson / McFadzean	7
(Scotland) Jackson / McFadzean	5
(Switzerland) Schwaller / Schwaller	9
(Switzerland) Pätz / Michel	5
(Netherlands) Tonoli / Gösgens	6
(Netherlands) Tonoli / Gösgens	3
(Switzerland) Schwaller / Schwaller	10
(Switzerland) Schwaller / Schwaller	7
(Austria) Müller / Seiwald	4

First Knockout	Qualifier 2
(Norway) Skaslien / Nedregotten	11
(United States) Danahey / Allain	2
(Norway) Skaslien / Nedregotten	8
(Scotland) Henderson / Hardie	4
(Scotland) Henderson / Hardie	11
(Turkey) Yıldız / Çakır	3
(Norway) Skaslien / Nedregotten	3
(Scotland) Morrison / Lammie	9
(Switzerland) Perret / Rios	6
(Sweden) de Val / Magnusson	7
(Sweden) de Val / Magnusson	4
(Scotland) Morrison / Lammie	8
(Denmark) Holtermann / Holtermann	6
(Scotland) Morrison / Lammie	7

First Knockout	Qualifier 3
(Sweden) Westman / Ahlberg	10
(Scotland) Munro / Whyte	4
(Sweden) Westman / Ahlberg	8
(Czech Republic) Paulová / Paul	4
(Czech Republic) Paulová / Paul	W
(Switzerland) Engler / Wunderlin	L
(Sweden) Westman / Ahlberg	3
(Scotland) Dodds / Mouat	6
(Canada) Martin / Laycock	7
(Switzerland) Hueppi / Weiss	2
(Canada) Martin / Laycock	5
(Scotland) Dodds / Mouat	6
(Scotland) Dodds / Mouat	7
(Germany) Schöll / Angrick	0

=== B Event ===
Second Knockout	Qualifier 4
(Scotland) Munro / Whyte	2
(China) Yang / Tian	7	(China) Yang / Tian	9
(Germany) Abbes / Harsch	5	(China) Yang / Tian	5
(Sweden) de Val / Magnusson	6
(Sweden) de Val / Magnusson	9
(Canada) Martin / Laycock	11
(Switzerland) Engler / Wunderlin	12
(Switzerland) Pätz / Michel	8	(Switzerland) Pätz / Michel	6
(Austria) Müller / Seiwald	2	(Switzerland) Engler / Wunderlin	2
(Canada) Martin / Laycock	6
(Canada) Martin / Laycock	6
(Norway) Skaslien / Nedregotten	10
(Netherlands) Tonoli / Gösgens	3
(Turkey) Yıldız / Çakır	7
(Switzerland) Hueppi / Weiss	3
(United States) Danahey / Allain	2	(Turkey) Yıldız / Çakır	9
(Turkey) Yıldız / Çakır	10	(Turkey) Yıldız / Çakır	4
(Norway) Skaslien / Nedregotten	7

Second Knockout	Qualifier 5
(Scotland) Henderson / Hardie	8
(Czech Republic) Paulová / Paul	5
(Scotland) Henderson / Hardie	5
(Scotland) Jackson / McFadzean	10
(Scotland) Jackson / McFadzean	2
(Sweden) Westman / Ahlberg	7
(Finland) Suuripää / Sipilä	2
(Switzerland) Perret / Rios	8
(Germany) Schöll / Angrick	3
(Switzerland) Perret / Rios	8	(Switzerland) Perret / Rios	8
(Denmark) Holtermann / Holtermann	5	(Switzerland) Perret / Rios	4
(Sweden) Westman / Ahlberg	6

=== C Event ===
Third Knockout				Qualifier 6
(China) Yang / Tian	10
(Czech Republic) Paulová / Paul	5	(China) Yang / Tian	5
		(Switzerland) Perret / Rios	6
				(Switzerland) Perret / Rios	6
				(Canada) Martin / Laycock	5

Third Knockout	Qualifier 7
(Austria) Müller / Seiwald	7
(United States) Danahey / Allain	4	(Austria) Müller / Seiwald	5
(Scotland) Munro / Whyte	8
(Scotland) Munro / Whyte	7
(Finland) Suuripää / Sipilä	4
(Scotland) Munro / Whyte	8
(Scotland) Henderson / Hardie	6
(Scotland) Munro / Whyte	3
(Sweden) de Val / Magnusson	10
(Netherlands) Tonoli / Gösgens	4
(Germany) Abbes / Harsch	2	(Switzerland) Pätz / Michel	7
(Denmark) Holtermann / Holtermann	9	(Denmark) Holtermann / Holtermann	3
(Switzerland) Pätz / Michel	5
(Switzerland) Pätz / Michel	3
(Sweden) de Val / Magnusson	9

Third Knockout	Qualifier 8
(Switzerland) Engler / Wunderlin	9
(Switzerland) Hueppi / Weiss	3	(Germany) Schöll / Angrick	4
(Germany) Schöll / Angrick	5	(Switzerland) Engler / Wunderlin	9
(Turkey) Yıldız / Çakır	2
(Switzerland) Engler / Wunderlin	6
(Scotland) Jackson / McFadzean	8

== Knockout Results ==
All draw times listed in Central European Time (UTC+01:00).

=== Draw 1 ===
Friday, October 18, 8:00 am

Sheet 1	1	2	3	4	5	6	7	8	Final
(China) Yang / Tian	0	3	0	1	0	2	0	0	6
(Finland) Suuripää / Sipilä 🔨	1	0	2	0	3	0	1	1	8

Sheet 2	1	2	3	4	5	6	7	8	Final
(Germany) Abbes / Harsch 🔨	0	2	0	3	0	0	0	0	5
(Scotland) Jackson / McFadzean	1	0	2	0	1	1	1	1	7

Sheet 3	1	2	3	4	5	6	7	8	Final
(Switzerland) Pätz / Michel 🔨	0	1	0	1	0	2	1	0	5
(Netherlands) Tonoli / Gösgens	1	0	3	0	1	0	0	1	6

Sheet 4	1	2	3	4	5	6	7	8	Final
(Switzerland) Schwaller / Schwaller 🔨	2	0	0	3	2	0	0	X	7
(Austria) Müller / Seiwald	0	1	1	0	0	1	1	X	4

Sheet 5	1	2	3	4	5	6	7	8	Final
(Norway) Skaslien / Nedregotten 🔨	2	0	0	5	2	2	X	X	11
(United States) Danahey / Allain	0	1	1	0	0	0	X	X	2

Sheet 6	1	2	3	4	5	6	7	8	Final
(Scotland) Henderson / Hardie 🔨	3	0	6	0	2	X	X	X	11
(Turkey) Yıldız / Çakır	0	1	0	2	0	X	X	X	3

Sheet 7	1	2	3	4	5	6	7	8	Final
(Switzerland) Perret / Rios	0	3	1	0	0	1	1	0	6
(Sweden) de Val / Magnusson 🔨	1	0	0	4	1	0	0	1	7

Sheet 8	1	2	3	4	5	6	7	8	9	Final
(Denmark) Holtermann / Holtermann 🔨	2	0	0	1	0	1	0	2	0	6
(Scotland) Morrison / Lammie	0	1	1	0	1	0	3	0	1	7

=== Draw 2 ===
Friday, October 18, 12:00 pm

Sheet 1	1	2	3	4	5	6	7	8	Final
(Switzerland) Perret / Rios	3	0	1	2	0	2	0	X	8
(Denmark) Holtermann / Holtermann 🔨	0	1	0	0	3	0	1	X	5

Sheet 2	1	2	3	4	5	6	7	8	Final
(United States) Danahey / Allain	0	0	2	0	0	0	X	X	2
(Turkey) Yıldız / Çakır 🔨	2	2	0	2	2	2	X	X	10

Sheet 3	Final
(Czech Republic) Paulová / Paul 🔨	W
(Switzerland) Engler / Wunderlin	L

Sheet 4	1	2	3	4	5	6	7	8	Final
(Canada) Martin / Laycock 🔨	0	1	1	0	2	2	1	X	7
(Switzerland) Hueppi / Weiss	1	0	0	1	0	0	0	X	2

Sheet 5	1	2	3	4	5	6	7	8	Final
(Sweden) Westman / Ahlberg 🔨	3	0	0	3	0	2	2	X	10
(Scotland) Munro / Whyte	0	2	1	0	1	0	0	X	4

Sheet 6	1	2	3	4	5	6	7	8	Final
(China) Yang / Tian 🔨	0	2	0	1	1	2	0	1	7
(Germany) Abbes / Harsch	2	0	2	0	0	0	1	0	5

Sheet 7	1	2	3	4	5	6	7	8	Final
(Switzerland) Pätz / Michel 🔨	2	1	2	0	2	1	X	X	8
(Austria) Müller / Seiwald	0	0	0	2	0	0	X	X	2

Sheet 8	1	2	3	4	5	6	7	8	Final
(Scotland) Dodds / Mouat 🔨	1	1	4	1	X	X	X	X	7
(Germany) Schöll / Angrick	0	0	0	0	X	X	X	X	0

=== Draw 3 ===
Friday, October 18, 4:00 pm

Sheet 3	1	2	3	4	5	6	7	8	Final
(Sweden) de Val / Magnusson	2	0	1	0	0	0	1	0	4
(Scotland) Morrison / Lammie 🔨	0	1	0	1	1	2	0	3	8

Sheet 4	1	2	3	4	5	6	7	8	Final
(Sweden) Westman / Ahlberg 🔨	0	1	1	1	0	4	1	X	8
(Czech Republic) Paulová / Paul	2	0	0	0	2	0	0	X	4

Sheet 5	1	2	3	4	5	6	7	8	Final
(Canada) Martin / Laycock	1	1	1	0	1	0	1	0	5
(Scotland) Dodds / Mouat 🔨	0	0	0	2	0	1	0	3	6

Sheet 6	1	2	3	4	5	6	7	8	Final
(Netherlands) Tonoli / Gösgens	0	0	0	1	0	2	0	X	3
(Switzerland) Schwaller / Schwaller 🔨	4	1	1	0	2	0	2	X	10

Sheet 7	1	2	3	4	5	6	7	8	Final
(Finland) Suuripää / Sipilä	0	0	1	2	1	0	1	0	5
(Scotland) Jackson / McFadzean 🔨	1	2	0	0	0	2	0	1	6

Sheet 8	1	2	3	4	5	6	7	8	Final
(Norway) Skaslien / Nedregotten 🔨	1	2	1	0	1	0	1	2	8
(Scotland) Henderson / Hardie	0	0	0	3	0	1	0	0	4

=== Draw 4 ===
Friday, October 18, 8:00 pm

Sheet 1	1	2	3	4	5	6	7	8	Final
(Austria) Müller / Seiwald 🔨	1	0	1	0	1	0	4	X	7
(United States) Danahey / Allain	0	2	0	1	0	1	0	X	4

Sheet 2	1	2	3	4	5	6	7	8	Final
(Germany) Abbes / Harsch	1	0	0	0	1	0	X	X	2
(Denmark) Holtermann / Holtermann 🔨	0	1	3	3	0	2	X	X	9

Sheet 3	1	2	3	4	5	6	7	8	Final
(Scotland) Munro / Whyte	2	0	0	0	0	X	X	X	2
(China) Yang / Tian 🔨	0	4	3	1	1	X	X	X	9

Sheet 4	1	2	3	4	5	6	7	8	Final
(Switzerland) Engler / Wunderlin 🔨	0	0	5	1	0	6	X	X	12
(Switzerland) Pätz / Michel	2	2	0	0	2	0	X	X	6

Sheet 5	1	2	3	4	5	6	7	8	Final
(Switzerland) Hueppi / Weiss	0	1	0	2	0	0	X	X	3
(Turkey) Yıldız / Çakır 🔨	4	0	1	0	3	1	X	X	9

Sheet 6	1	2	3	4	5	6	7	8	Final
(Germany) Schöll / Angrick 🔨	0	0	2	0	0	1	X	X	3
(Switzerland) Perret / Rios	2	2	0	1	3	0	X	X	8

=== Draw 5 ===
Saturday, October 19, 8:00 am

Sheet 1	1	2	3	4	5	6	7	8	Final
(Netherlands) Tonoli / Gösgens 🔨	0	0	1	0	2	0	0	0	3
(Turkey) Yıldız / Çakır	1	1	0	2	0	1	1	1	7

Sheet 2	1	2	3	4	5	6	7	8	9	Final
(China) Yang / Tian	2	0	0	0	2	0	0	1	0	5
(Sweden) de Val / Magnusson 🔨	0	1	1	1	0	1	1	0	1	6

Sheet 3	1	2	3	4	5	6	7	8	Final
(Finland) Suuripää / Sipilä	0	0	1	0	1	0	X	X	2
(Switzerland) Perret / Rios 🔨	1	1	0	4	0	2	X	X	8

Sheet 4	1	2	3	4	5	6	7	8	Final
(Scotland) Jackson / McFadzean	0	0	4	0	0	1	0	X	5
(Switzerland) Schwaller / Schwaller 🔨	2	1	0	3	2	0	1	X	9

Sheet 5	1	2	3	4	5	6	7	8	Final
(Norway) Skaslien / Nedregotten	0	2	0	0	1	0	X	X	3
(Scotland) Morrison / Lammie 🔨	2	0	2	2	0	3	X	X	9

Sheet 6	1	2	3	4	5	6	7	8	Final
(Sweden) Westman / Ahlberg	1	0	1	0	0	1	0	X	3
(Scotland) Dodds / Mouat 🔨	0	1	0	3	1	0	1	X	6

Sheet 7	1	2	3	4	5	6	7	8	Final
(Scotland) Henderson / Hardie 🔨	1	0	3	1	0	1	0	2	8
(Czech Republic) Paulová / Paul	0	2	0	0	1	0	2	0	5

Sheet 8	1	2	3	4	5	6	7	8	Final
(Switzerland) Engler / Wunderlin	1	0	0	0	0	1	0	0	2
(Canada) Martin / Laycock 🔨	0	1	1	1	1	0	1	1	6

=== Draw 6 ===
Saturday, October 19, 11:00 am

Sheet 2	1	2	3	4	5	6	7	8	Final
(Switzerland) Hueppi / Weiss	0	1	0	2	0	0	0	X	3
(Germany) Schöll / Angrick 🔨	1	0	1	0	1	1	1	X	5

Sheet 3	1	2	3	4	5	6	7	8	Final
(Denmark) Holtermann / Holtermann	0	0	0	1	1	0	1	0	3
(Switzerland) Pätz / Michel 🔨	1	1	1	0	0	1	0	1	5

Sheet 4	1	2	3	4	5	6	7	8	Final
(Switzerland) Perret / Rios 🔨	1	1	0	1	0	1	0	X	4
(Sweden) Westman / Ahlberg	0	0	1	0	2	0	3	X	6

Sheet 5	1	2	3	4	5	6	7	8	Final
(Sweden) de Val / Magnusson 🔨	3	0	0	0	3	0	3	0	9
(Canada) Martin / Laycock	0	2	2	2	0	4	0	1	11

Sheet 6	1	2	3	4	5	6	7	8	Final
(Turkey) Yıldız / Çakır 🔨	0	1	1	0	1	0	1	X	4
(Norway) Skaslien / Nedregotten	2	0	0	3	0	2	0	X	7

Sheet 7	1	2	3	4	5	6	7	8	Final
(Austria) Müller / Seiwald 🔨	0	1	0	0	3	0	1	X	5
(Scotland) Munro / Whyte	1	0	3	1	0	3	0	X	8

Sheet 8	1	2	3	4	5	6	7	8	Final
(Scotland) Henderson / Hardie 🔨	2	0	0	0	2	1	0	X	5
(Scotland) Jackson / McFadzean	0	4	1	2	0	0	3	X	10

=== Draw 7 ===
Saturday, October 19, 2:00 pm

Sheet 1	1	2	3	4	5	6	7	8	Final
(China) Yang / Tian	0	1	2	0	0	4	3	X	10
(Czech Republic) Paulová / Paul 🔨	2	0	0	1	2	0	0	X	5

Sheet 2	1	2	3	4	5	6	7	8	Final
(Scotland) Munro / Whyte 🔨	0	1	1	2	0	2	1	X	7
(Finland) Suuripää / Sipilä	1	0	0	0	3	0	0	X	4

Sheet 3	1	2	3	4	5	6	7	8	Final
(Switzerland) Engler / Wunderlin 🔨	3	0	4	0	2	0	X	X	9
(Germany) Schöll / Angrick	0	1	0	2	0	1	X	X	4

Sheet 4	1	2	3	4	5	6	7	8	Final
(Canada) Martin / Laycock	2	0	2	2	0	0	0	X	6
(Norway) Skaslien / Nedregotten 🔨	0	3	0	0	3	3	1	X	10

Sheet 5	1	2	3	4	5	6	7	8	Final
(Scotland) Jackson / McFadzean	0	0	0	2	0	0	X	X	2
(Sweden) Westman / Ahlberg 🔨	2	1	2	0	1	1	X	X	7

Sheet 6	1	2	3	4	5	6	7	8	Final
(Netherlands) Tonoli / Gösgens	0	0	0	1	2	0	1	0	4
(Switzerland) Pätz / Michel 🔨	2	1	2	0	0	1	0	1	7

=== Draw 8 ===
Saturday, October 19, 6:00 pm

Sheet 3	1	2	3	4	5	6	7	8	Final
(China) Yang / Tian	0	1	1	1	0	0	2	0	5
(Switzerland) Perret / Rios 🔨	1	0	0	0	2	2	0	1	6

Sheet 4	1	2	3	4	5	6	7	8	Final
(Switzerland) Pätz / Michel 🔨	1	0	1	0	1	0	X	X	3
(Sweden) de Val / Magnusson	0	4	0	2	0	3	X	X	9

Sheet 5	1	2	3	4	5	6	7	8	Final
(Switzerland) Engler / Wunderlin	1	2	0	2	0	1	3	X	9
(Turkey) Yıldız / Çakır 🔨	0	0	1	0	1	0	0	X	2

Sheet 6	1	2	3	4	5	6	7	8	Final
(Scotland) Munro / Whyte	2	0	1	0	1	0	4	0	8
(Scotland) Henderson / Hardie 🔨	0	1	0	1	0	3	0	1	6

=== Draw 9 ===
Saturday, October 19, 9:00 pm

Sheet 4	1	2	3	4	5	6	7	8	Final
(Switzerland) Engler / Wunderlin 🔨	2	1	0	0	2	0	1	X	6
(Scotland) Jackson / McFadzean	0	0	5	2	0	1	0	X	8

Sheet 5	1	2	3	4	5	6	7	8	Final
(Scotland) Munro / Whyte 🔨	2	0	0	1	0	0	X	X	3
(Sweden) de Val / Magnusson	0	3	1	0	4	2	X	X	10

Sheet 6	1	2	3	4	5	6	7	8	Final
(Switzerland) Perret / Rios	0	2	1	1	0	1	0	1	6
(Canada) Martin / Laycock 🔨	1	0	0	0	3	0	1	0	5

== Playoffs ==
Quarterfinals
1	(Switzerland) Schwaller / Schwaller	3
8	(Scotland) Jackson / McFadzean	6
4	(Norway) Skaslien / Nedregotten	6
5	(Sweden) Westman / Ahlberg	3
(Pairings are reseeded after the first round)
2	(Scotland) Morrison / Lammie	10
7	(Sweden) de Val / Magnusson	2
3	(Scotland) Dodds / Mouat	6
6	(Switzerland) Perret / Rios	5

Semifinals
2	(Scotland) Morrison / Lammie	7
8	(Scotland) Jackson / McFadzean	6
3	(Scotland) Dodds / Mouat	7
4	(Norway) Skaslien / Nedregotten	5

Final
2	(Scotland) Morrison / Lammie	8
3	(Scotland) Dodds / Mouat	7

=== Quarterfinals ===
Sunday, October 20, 8:00 am

Sheet 3	1	2	3	4	5	6	7	8	Final
(Switzerland) Schwaller / Schwaller 🔨	0	0	0	2	0	1	X	X	3
(Scotland) Jackson / McFadzean	1	2	2	0	1	0	X	X	6

Sheet 4	1	2	3	4	5	6	7	8	Final
(Scotland) Morrison / Lammie 🔨	4	3	0	3	X	X	X	X	10
(Sweden) de Val / Magnusson	0	0	2	0	X	X	X	X	2

Sheet 5	1	2	3	4	5	6	7	8	Final
(Scotland) Dodds / Mouat 🔨	1	0	3	0	1	1	0	0	6
(Switzerland) Perret / Rios	0	1	0	1	0	0	2	1	5

Sheet 6	1	2	3	4	5	6	7	8	Final
(Norway) Skaslien / Nedregotten 🔨	1	0	2	0	1	0	2	X	6
(Sweden) Westman / Ahlberg	0	1	0	1	0	1	0	X	3

=== Semifinals ===
Sunday, October 20, 11:00 am

Sheet 4	1	2	3	4	5	6	7	8	Final
(Scotland) Dodds / Mouat 🔨	1	2	0	2	0	1	0	1	7
(Norway) Skaslien / Nedregotten	0	0	2	0	1	0	2	0	5

Sheet 5	1	2	3	4	5	6	7	8	Final
(Scotland) Morrison / Lammie 🔨	0	1	1	0	1	2	0	2	7
(Scotland) Jackson / McFadzean	1	0	0	4	0	0	1	0	6

=== Final ===
Sunday, October 20, 2:00 pm

Sheet 5	1	2	3	4	5	6	7	8	Final
(Scotland) Morrison / Lammie	0	2	0	2	0	2	0	2	8
(Scotland) Dodds / Mouat 🔨	2	0	1	0	2	0	2	0	7
