= 2024 Mixed Doubles Gstaad =

- Host city: Gstaad, Switzerland
- Arena: Curling Club Gstaad
- Dates: October 14–16
- Winner: (Scotland) Dodds / Mouat
- Female: Jennifer Dodds
- Male: Bruce Mouat
- Finalist: (Norway) Skaslien / Nedregotten

The 2024 Mixed Doubles Gstaad was held from October 14 to 16 at Curling Club Gstaad in Gstaad, Switzerland. The event was held in a round robin format with a purse of 8,000 CHF. It was held as a partner event of the 2024 Mixed Doubles Bern which was played October 18 to 20.

The Scottish pair of Jennifer Dodds and Bruce Mouat won the second edition of the event, defeating Norway's Kristin Skaslien and Magnus Nedregotten 8–7 in the final. Dodds and Mouat took the long road to reach the championship game, finishing 3–2 and requiring a tiebreaker to advance to the playoffs. After defeating Therese Westman and Robin Ahlberg, the pair took out countrymates Fay Henderson and Grant Hardie 7–6 in the quarterfinals and Rebecca Morrison and Bobby Lammie 8–6 in the semifinals. Conversely, Skaslien and Nedregotten cruised through the round robin as the only team with an undefeated record, earning the top playoff seed. They then won 10–6 over Switzerland's Jenny Perret and Martin Rios in the quarters and doubled up on Scotland's Sophie Jackson and Duncan McFadzean 6–3 in the semis to advance. Other playoff qualifiers included Canada's Nancy Martin and Steve Laycock and China's Yang Ying and Tian Jiafeng.

The world number one ranked team of Marie Kaldvee and Harri Lill pulled out of the event on the second day due to injury, forfeiting the rest of their games. They previously held a 2–1 record.

== Teams ==
The teams are listed as follows:

Female	Male	Locale
Emira Abbes	Klaudius Harsch	Füssen, Germany
Jennifer Dodds	Bruce Mouat	Stirling, Scotland
Paulina Hajduk	Ján Horáček	Bratislava, Slovakia
Fay Henderson	Grant Hardie	Stirling, Scotland
Lea Hüppi	Jonas Weiss	Dübendorf, Switzerland
Sophie Jackson	Duncan McFadzean	Stirling, Scotland
Marie Kaldvee	Harri Lill	Tallinn, Estonia
Nancy Martin	Steve Laycock	(Canada) Saskatoon, Saskatchewan
Rebecca Morrison	Bobby Lammie	Stirling, Scotland
Lisa Muhmenthaler	René Iseli	Gstaad, Switzerland
Robyn Munro	Ross Whyte	Stirling, Scotland
Jenny Perret	Martin Rios	Glarus, Switzerland
Pia-Lisa Schöll	Leonhard Angrick	Oberstdorf, Germany
Kristin Skaslien	Magnus Nedregotten	Oslo, Norway
Tiina Suuripää	Markus Sipilä	Hyvinkää, Finland
Therese Westman	Robin Ahlberg	Sundbyberg, Sweden
Yang Ying	Tian Jiafeng	Beijing, China
Dilşat Yıldız	Bilal Ömer Çakır	Erzurum, Turkey

== Round robin standings ==
Final Round Robin Standings

Key
Teams to Playoffs
Teams to Tiebreakers

Pool A	W	L	PF	PA	SO
(Scotland) Henderson / Hardie	4	1	29	18	1
(China) Yang / Tian	4	1	42	24	5
(Sweden) Westman / Ahlberg	3	2	26	28	9
(Germany) Schöll / Angrick	2	3	29	26	6
(Estonia) Kaldvee / Lill	2	3	23	17	15
(Switzerland) Muhmenthaler / Iseli	0	5	15	51	14

Pool B	W	L	PF	PA	SO
(Canada) Martin / Laycock	4	1	31	24	3
(Scotland) Jackson / McFadzean	4	1	38	22	4
(Scotland) Munro / Whyte	3	2	36	23	7
(Switzerland) Perret / Rios	3	2	30	25	12
(Turkey) Yıldız / Çakır	1	4	22	33	18
(Slovakia) Hajduk / Horáček	0	5	12	42	17

Pool C	W	L	PF	PA	SO
(Norway) Skaslien / Nedregotten	5	0	40	17	2
(Scotland) Morrison / Lammie	4	1	34	15	13
(Scotland) Dodds / Mouat	3	2	32	25	11
(Germany) Abbes / Harsch	2	3	34	26	10
(Switzerland) Hüppi / Weiss	1	4	16	38	16
(Finland) Suuripää / Sipilä	0	5	10	45	8

== Round robin results ==
All draw times listed in Central European Time (UTC+01:00).

=== Draw 1 ===
Monday, October 14, 8:00 am

Sheet 1	1	2	3	4	5	6	7	8	Final
(Scotland) Henderson / Hardie	0	0	0	0	0	X	X	X	0
(China) Yang / Tian	2	1	2	1	1	X	X	X	7

Sheet 2	1	2	3	4	5	6	7	8	Final
(Sweden) Westman / Ahlberg	0	2	0	1	0	3	0	1	7
(Germany) Schöll / Angrick	1	0	1	0	1	0	3	0	6

Sheet 3	1	2	3	4	5	6	7	8	Final
(Switzerland) Muhmenthaler / Iseli	1	0	0	2	0	0	0	X	3
(Estonia) Kaldvee / Lill	0	3	1	0	1	4	1	X	10

Sheet 4	1	2	3	4	5	6	7	8	Final
(Turkey) Yıldız / Çakır	0	0	0	0	2	0	X	X	2
(Canada) Martin / Laycock	1	1	2	1	0	3	X	X	8

Sheet 5	1	2	3	4	5	6	7	8	Final
(Switzerland) Perret / Rios	0	0	0	1	0	0	X	X	1
(Scotland) Jackson / McFadzean	1	1	2	0	1	1	X	X	6

=== Draw 2 ===
Monday, October 14, 11:00 am

Sheet 1	1	2	3	4	5	6	7	8	Final
(Switzerland) Muhmenthaler / Iseli	0	0	0	0	1	0	X	X	1
(Germany) Schöll / Angrick	3	2	1	1	0	1	X	X	8

Sheet 2	1	2	3	4	5	6	7	8	Final
(Switzerland) Hüppi / Weiss	0	0	1	0	2	0	X	X	3
(Germany) Abbes / Harsch	2	4	0	3	0	1	X	X	10

Sheet 3	1	2	3	4	5	6	7	8	Final
(Scotland) Dodds / Mouat	2	2	0	3	1	X	X	X	8
(Finland) Suuripää / Sipilä	0	0	1	0	0	X	X	X	1

Sheet 4	1	2	3	4	5	6	7	8	9	Final
(Scotland) Morrison / Lammie	2	1	0	0	0	1	0	1	0	5
(Norway) Skaslien / Nedregotten	0	0	2	0	1	0	2	0	1	6

Sheet 5	1	2	3	4	5	6	7	8	Final
(Slovakia) Hajduk / Horáček	0	0	0	0	X	X	X	X	0
(Scotland) Munro / Whyte	3	1	3	2	X	X	X	X	9

=== Draw 3 ===
Monday, October 14, 2:00 pm

Sheet 1	1	2	3	4	5	6	7	8	Final
(Scotland) Jackson / McFadzean	0	1	1	0	4	0	1	0	7
(Scotland) Munro / Whyte	1	0	0	2	0	2	0	1	6

Sheet 2	1	2	3	4	5	6	7	8	Final
(Slovakia) Hajduk / Horáček	0	0	0	1	X	X	X	X	1
(Canada) Martin / Laycock	2	2	3	0	X	X	X	X	7

Sheet 3	1	2	3	4	5	6	7	8	Final
(Turkey) Yıldız / Çakır	0	0	1	1	1	0	1	0	4
(Switzerland) Perret / Rios	2	1	0	0	0	1	0	1	5

Sheet 4	1	2	3	4	5	6	7	8	Final
(China) Yang / Tian	1	0	2	0	1	0	3	0	7
(Estonia) Kaldvee / Lill	0	2	0	2	0	4	0	1	9

Sheet 5	1	2	3	4	5	6	7	8	Final
(Sweden) Westman / Ahlberg	1	0	0	0	X	X	X	X	1
(Scotland) Henderson / Hardie	0	2	3	2	X	X	X	X	7

=== Draw 4 ===
Monday, October 14, 5:00 pm

Sheet 1	1	2	3	4	5	6	7	8	Final
(Scotland) Dodds / Mouat	5	0	3	0	2	2	X	X	12
(Switzerland) Hüppi / Weiss	0	2	0	2	0	0	X	X	4

Sheet 2	1	2	3	4	5	6	7	8	Final
(Scotland) Morrison / Lammie	1	0	2	1	0	2	1	X	7
(Finland) Suuripää / Sipilä	0	1	0	0	1	0	0	X	2

Sheet 3	1	2	3	4	5	6	7	8	Final
(Germany) Abbes / Harsch	0	1	0	3	0	2	1	0	7
(Norway) Skaslien / Nedregotten	2	0	1	0	3	0	0	2	8

Sheet 4	1	2	3	4	5	6	7	8	Final
(Scotland) Henderson / Hardie	0	2	0	4	0	3	0	X	9
(Germany) Schöll / Angrick	1	0	3	0	2	0	1	X	7

Sheet 5	1	2	3	4	5	6	7	8	Final
(Switzerland) Muhmenthaler / Iseli	1	0	0	3	0	1	0	X	5
(China) Yang / Tian	0	4	2	0	3	0	2	X	11

=== Draw 5 ===
Monday, October 14, 8:00 pm

Sheet 1	1	2	3	4	5	6	7	8	Final
(Estonia) Kaldvee / Lill	2	0	0	1	1	0	0	0	4
(Sweden) Westman / Ahlberg	0	1	1	0	0	1	2	2	7

Sheet 2	1	2	3	4	5	6	7	8	Final
(Scotland) Munro / Whyte	2	2	1	3	0	X	X	X	8
(Turkey) Yıldız / Çakır	0	0	0	0	1	X	X	X	1

Sheet 3	1	2	3	4	5	6	7	8	Final
(Switzerland) Perret / Rios	5	0	5	1	X	X	X	X	11
(Canada) Martin / Laycock	0	2	0	0	X	X	X	X	2

Sheet 4	1	2	3	4	5	6	7	8	Final
(Slovakia) Hajduk / Horáček	0	0	2	0	1	1	0	X	4
(Scotland) Jackson / McFadzean	2	1	0	3	0	0	4	X	10

Sheet 5	1	2	3	4	5	6	7	8	Final
(Norway) Skaslien / Nedregotten	1	4	1	2	X	X	X	X	8
(Scotland) Dodds / Mouat	0	0	0	0	X	X	X	X	0

=== Draw 6 ===
Tuesday, October 15, 8:00 am

Sheet 1	1	2	3	4	5	6	7	8	Final
(Scotland) Morrison / Lammie	1	0	1	0	2	2	1	X	7
(Germany) Abbes / Harsch	0	1	0	1	0	0	0	X	2

Sheet 2	Final
(Estonia) Kaldvee / Lill	L
(Scotland) Henderson / Hardie	W

Sheet 3	1	2	3	4	5	6	7	8	Final
(Germany) Schöll / Angrick	0	2	0	1	0	3	0	2	8
(China) Yang / Tian	4	0	2	0	1	0	2	0	9

Sheet 4	1	2	3	4	5	6	7	8	Final
(Sweden) Westman / Ahlberg	2	1	1	1	0	1	3	X	9
(Switzerland) Muhmenthaler / Iseli	0	0	0	0	3	0	0	X	3

Sheet 5	1	2	3	4	5	6	7	8	Final
(Switzerland) Hüppi / Weiss	1	2	1	0	1	1	1	X	7
(Finland) Suuripää / Sipilä	0	0	0	3	0	0	0	X	3

=== Draw 7 ===
Tuesday, October 15, 11:00 am

Sheet 1	1	2	3	4	5	6	7	8	9	Final
(Scotland) Munro / Whyte	2	0	2	0	1	0	1	0	1	7
(Switzerland) Perret / Rios	0	1	0	2	0	2	0	1	0	6

Sheet 2	1	2	3	4	5	6	7	8	Final
(Scotland) Dodds / Mouat	1	0	1	0	0	2	0	X	4
(Scotland) Morrison / Lammie	0	1	0	2	2	0	4	X	9

Sheet 3	1	2	3	4	5	6	7	8	Final
(Canada) Martin / Laycock	1	0	0	0	2	1	0	1	5
(Scotland) Jackson / McFadzean	0	1	1	1	0	0	1	0	4

Sheet 4	1	2	3	4	5	6	7	8	Final
(Norway) Skaslien / Nedregotten	2	0	2	2	1	X	X	X	7
(Switzerland) Hüppi / Weiss	0	1	0	0	0	X	X	X	1

Sheet 5	1	2	3	4	5	6	7	8	Final
(Turkey) Yıldız / Çakır	3	2	0	4	X	X	X	X	9
(Slovakia) Hajduk / Horáček	0	0	1	0	X	X	X	X	1

=== Draw 8 ===
Tuesday, October 15, 2:00 pm

Sheet 1	Final
(Germany) Schöll / Angrick	W
(Estonia) Kaldvee / Lill	L

Sheet 2	1	2	3	4	5	6	7	8	Final
(Switzerland) Perret / Rios	1	0	1	0	0	2	0	3	7
(Slovakia) Hajduk / Horáček	0	2	0	2	1	0	1	0	6

Sheet 3	1	2	3	4	5	6	7	8	Final
(China) Yang / Tian	1	0	1	2	0	3	1	X	8
(Sweden) Westman / Ahlberg	0	1	0	0	1	0	0	X	2

Sheet 4	1	2	3	4	5	6	7	8	Final
(Finland) Suuripää / Sipilä	0	0	0	0	X	X	X	X	0
(Germany) Abbes / Harsch	2	4	3	3	X	X	X	X	12

Sheet 5	1	2	3	4	5	6	7	8	Final
(Scotland) Henderson / Hardie	5	0	1	2	0	5	X	X	13
(Switzerland) Muhmenthaler / Iseli	0	1	0	0	2	0	X	X	3

=== Draw 9 ===
Tuesday, October 15, 5:00 pm

Sheet 1	1	2	3	4	5	6	7	8	Final
(Finland) Suuripää / Sipilä	0	3	0	0	1	X	X	X	4
(Norway) Skaslien / Nedregotten	2	0	4	5	0	X	X	X	11

Sheet 2	1	2	3	4	5	6	7	8	Final
(Germany) Abbes / Harsch	0	0	1	0	1	1	0	X	3
(Scotland) Dodds / Mouat	1	2	0	2	0	0	3	X	8

Sheet 3	1	2	3	4	5	6	7	8	Final
(Switzerland) Hüppi / Weiss	0	0	0	0	1	0	X	X	1
(Scotland) Morrison / Lammie	2	1	1	1	0	1	X	X	6

Sheet 4	1	2	3	4	5	6	7	8	Final
(Canada) Martin / Laycock	1	0	1	1	0	0	0	6	9
(Scotland) Munro / Whyte	0	1	0	0	2	1	2	0	6

Sheet 5	1	2	3	4	5	6	7	8	Final
(Scotland) Jackson / McFadzean	0	0	5	1	2	0	3	X	11
(Turkey) Yıldız / Çakır	1	2	0	0	0	3	0	X	6

== Tiebreakers ==
Tuesday, October 15, 9:00 pm

Sheet 2	1	2	3	4	5	6	7	8	9	Final
(Scotland) Munro / Whyte	2	0	0	2	0	1	0	2	0	7
(Switzerland) Perret / Rios	0	2	2	0	1	0	2	0	1	8

Sheet 3	1	2	3	4	5	6	7	8	9	Final
(Sweden) Westman / Ahlberg	0	0	0	1	0	5	0	1	0	7
(Scotland) Dodds / Mouat	2	1	1	0	1	0	2	0	2	9

== Playoffs ==
Quarterfinals
1	(Norway) Skaslien / Nedregotten	10
8	(Switzerland) Perret / Rios	6
4	(Scotland) Jackson / McFadzean	10
5	(China) Yang / Tian	0
2	(Scotland) Henderson / Hardie	6
7	(Scotland) Dodds / Mouat	7
3	(Canada) Martin / Laycock	5
6	(Scotland) Morrison / Lammie	8

Semifinals
1	(Norway) Skaslien / Nedregotten	6
4	(Scotland) Jackson / McFadzean	3
7	(Scotland) Dodds / Mouat	8
6	(Scotland) Morrison / Lammie	6

Final
1	(Norway) Skaslien / Nedregotten	7
7	(Scotland) Dodds / Mouat	8

=== Quarterfinals ===
Wednesday, October 16, 8:00 am

Sheet 1	1	2	3	4	5	6	7	8	Final
(Scotland) Jackson / McFadzean	2	2	1	5	X	X	X	X	10
(China) Yang / Tian	0	0	0	0	X	X	X	X	0

Sheet 2	1	2	3	4	5	6	7	8	Final
(Norway) Skaslien / Nedregotten	1	1	0	1	0	0	4	3	10
(Switzerland) Perret / Rios	0	0	2	0	2	2	0	0	6

Sheet 4	1	2	3	4	5	6	7	8	Final
(Scotland) Henderson / Hardie	0	1	0	0	2	0	3	0	6
(Scotland) Dodds / Mouat	1	0	1	1	0	3	0	1	7

Sheet 5	1	2	3	4	5	6	7	8	Final
(Canada) Martin / Laycock	2	0	2	0	0	1	0	0	5
(Scotland) Morrison / Lammie	0	1	0	1	2	0	3	1	8

=== Semifinals ===
Wednesday, October 16, 11:00 am

Sheet 2	1	2	3	4	5	6	7	8	Final
(Scotland) Dodds / Mouat	0	4	0	2	0	1	1	0	8
(Scotland) Morrison / Lammie	1	0	2	0	2	0	0	1	6

Sheet 4	1	2	3	4	5	6	7	8	Final
(Norway) Skaslien / Nedregotten	0	1	0	1	1	1	0	2	6
(Scotland) Jackson / McFadzean	1	0	1	0	0	0	1	0	3

=== Final ===
Wednesday, October 16, 2:30 pm

Sheet 3	1	2	3	4	5	6	7	8	Final
(Norway) Skaslien / Nedregotten	0	1	0	4	1	0	0	1	7
(Scotland) Dodds / Mouat	1	0	3	0	0	3	1	0	8
