= 2024 AMJ Campbell Shorty Jenkins Classic =

- Host city: Cornwall, Ontario
- Arena: Cornwall Curling Centre
- Dates: September 11–15
- Men's winner: (Switzerland) Team Schwaller
- Curling club: CC Genève, Geneva
- Skip: Yannick Schwaller
- Fourth: Benoît Schwarz-van Berkel
- Second: Sven Michel
- Lead: Pablo Lachat
- Coach: Håvard Vad Petersson
- Finalist: (Scotland) Bruce Mouat
- Women's winner: (Ontario) Team Homan
- Curling club: Ottawa CC, Ottawa
- Skip: Rachel Homan
- Third: Tracy Fleury
- Second: Emma Miskew
- Lead: Sarah Wilkes
- Coach: Brendan Bottcher
- Finalist: (Switzerland) Silvana Tirinzoni

The 2024 AMJ Campbell Shorty Jenkins Classic was a curling tournament held from September 11 to 15 at the Cornwall Curling Centre in Cornwall, Ontario. The event was held in a round robin format with a purse of $60,000 on the men's side and $45,000 on the women's side.

On the men's side, Yannick Schwaller's Swiss rink from Geneva won their second straight Ontario tour event, defeating Scotland's Bruce Mouat 5–3 in the championship game. The team, consisting of Schwaller, Benoît Schwarz-van Berkel, Sven Michel and Pablo Lachat never trailed en route to securing the title, stealing one in the eighth end after a missed runback by the Scotts. The Swiss also won the 2024 Stu Sells Oakville Tankard the week prior, putting them in first place on the World Curling Team Raking Year-to-Date standings. To reach the final, the team went 5–0 through the round robin and won both of their playoff matches against Kyle Waddell and Félix Asselin. Team Mouat finished 4–1 in round robin play before picking up wins over Matt Dunstone and Joël Retornaz in the quarterfinals and semifinals respectively. Ross Whyte and Xu Xiaoming rounded out the playoff field.

In the women's final, Rachel Homan and her Ottawa based squad stole two in the eighth end to defeat Switzerland's Silvana Tirinzoni 6–5 in a rematch of the world championship final. Facing two on her final stone, Swiss fourth Alina Pätz came up light on her draw to the four-foot. Team Homan, with Tracy Fleury, Emma Miskew and Sarah Wilkes continued their dominance from the 2023–24 season, winning all eight of their games. After finishing 5–0 in the preliminary round, the team beat Laurie St-Georges in the quarterfinals and then Kayla Skrlik in the semifinals. Team Tirinzoni reached the playoffs with a 4–1 record before defeating Gim Eun-ji and Satsuki Fujisawa to advance. Rebecca Morrison also qualified for the seven-team playoff round but lost to Skrlik in the quarterfinals.

== Men ==
=== Teams ===
The teams are listed as follows:

Skip	Third	Second	Lead	Alternate	Locale
Félix Asselin	Jean-Michel Ménard	Martin Crête	Jean-François Trépanier		Montreal, Quebec
Mike Harris (Note: Mike Harris spared for Daniel Casper.)	Luc Violette	Ben Richardson	Aidan Oldenburg		(United States) Chaska, Minnesota
James Grattan (Fourth)	Denis Cordick (Skip)	Doug McDermot	Jamie Waller		North Halton, Ontario
Mark Watt	– (Note: Team Craik played with three players. Mark Watt moved up to skip.)	Angus Bryce	Blair Haswell		Forfar, Scotland
Robert Desjardins	Yannick Martel	Jean-François Charest	Bradley Lequin		Chicoutimi, Quebec
Matt Dunstone	B. J. Neufeld	Colton Lott	Ryan Harnden		Winnipeg, Manitoba
Niklas Edin	Oskar Eriksson	Rasmus Wranå	Christoffer Sundgren		Karlstad, Sweden
John Epping	Jacob Horgan	Tanner Horgan	Ian McMillan		Sudbury, Ontario
Wouter Gösgens	Laurens Hoekman	Jaap van Dorp	Tobias van den Hurk	Alexander Magan	Zoetermeer, Netherlands
Philipp Hösli (Fourth)	Marco Hösli (Skip)	Simon Gloor	Justin Hausherr		Glarus, Switzerland
Scott Howard	Mat Camm	Jason Camm	Tim March		Navan, Ontario
Mark Kean	Brady Lumley	Matthew Garner	Spencer Dunlop		Woodstock, Ontario
Pierre-Luc Morissette	Pierre Lajoie	Marc-Alexandre Dion	Pierre Lanoue	Maxime Bilodeau	Quebec City, Quebec
Bruce Mouat	Grant Hardie	Bobby Lammie	Hammy McMillan Jr.		Stirling, Scotland
Marc Muskatewitz	Benny Kapp	Felix Messenzehl	Johannes Scheuerl	Mario Trevisiol	Füssen, Germany
Owen Purcell	Luke Saunders	Scott Saccary	Ryan Abraham		Halifax, Nova Scotia
Joël Retornaz	Amos Mosaner	Sebastiano Arman	Mattia Giovanella		Trentino, Italy
Benoît Schwarz-van Berkel (Fourth)	Yannick Schwaller (Skip)	Sven Michel	Pablo Lachat		Geneva, Switzerland
John Shuster	Chris Plys	Colin Hufman	John Landsteiner	Matt Hamilton	(United States) Duluth, Minnesota
Yves Stocker	Kim Schwaller	Felix Eberhard	Tom Winkelhausen		Zug, Switzerland
Julien Tremblay	Jean-Michel Arsenault	Jesse Mullen	Phillipe Brassard		Quebec City, Quebec
Kyle Waddell	Craig Waddell	Mark Taylor	Gavin Barr		Hamilton, Scotland
Ross Whyte	Robin Brydone	Duncan McFadzean	Euan Kyle		Stirling, Scotland
Xu Xiaoming	Zou Qiang	Wang Zhiyu	Guan Tianqi	Tian Jiafeng	Beijing, China

=== Round robin standings ===
Final Round Robin Standings

Key
Teams to Playoffs

Pool A	W	L	PF	PA
(Italy) Joël Retornaz	5	0	37	17
(Scotland) Kyle Waddell	3	2	36	21
(Quebec) Félix Asselin	3	2	30	27
(Nova Scotia) Owen Purcell	2	3	24	31
(United States) John Shuster	2	3	22	24
(Quebec) Pierre-Luc Morissette	0	5	14	43

Pool B	W	L	PF	PA
(Scotland) Bruce Mouat	4	1	34	14
(China) Xu Xiaoming	3	2	23	25
(Ontario) John Epping	3	2	35	25
(United States) Team Casper	2	3	20	27
(Scotland) Team Craik	2	3	22	29
(Ontario) Scott Howard	1	4	14	28

Pool C	W	L	PF	PA
(Scotland) Ross Whyte	5	0	30	11
(Manitoba) Matt Dunstone	3	2	26	22
(Switzerland) Marco Hösli	3	2	27	21
(Ontario) Mark Kean	2	3	21	23
(Netherlands) Wouter Gösgens	2	3	20	19
(Ontario) Denis Cordick	0	5	11	39

Pool D	W	L	PF	PA
(Switzerland) Yannick Schwaller	5	0	31	20
(Germany) Marc Muskatewitz	3	2	31	25
(Switzerland) Yves Stocker	2	3	27	28
(Quebec) Julien Tremblay	2	3	27	29
(Sweden) Niklas Edin	2	3	26	32
(Quebec) Robert Desjardins	1	4	22	30

=== Round robin results ===
All draw times are listed in Eastern Time (UTC−04:00).

==== Draw 1 ====
Wednesday, September 11, 2:00 pm

Sheet 1	1	2	3	4	5	6	7	8	Final
(Scotland) Kyle Waddell	0	0	1	0	2	0	2	0	5
(Italy) Joël Retornaz	0	1	0	2	0	2	0	1	6

Sheet 3	1	2	3	4	5	6	7	8	Final
(Scotland) Ross Whyte	1	0	0	0	2	0	1	0	4
(Netherlands) Wouter Gösgens	0	0	1	0	0	1	0	0	2

Sheet 4	1	2	3	4	5	6	7	8	Final
(Sweden) Niklas Edin	2	0	1	0	2	0	2	0	7
(Germany) Marc Muskatewitz	0	1	0	2	0	2	0	1	6

Sheet 5	1	2	3	4	5	6	7	8	Final
(United States) John Shuster	2	0	2	0	1	2	1	X	8
(Quebec) Félix Asselin	0	2	0	2	0	0	0	X	4

Sheet 6	1	2	3	4	5	6	7	8	Final
(Switzerland) Yannick Schwaller	0	2	0	2	0	1	0	1	6
(Switzerland) Yves Stocker	1	0	2	0	1	0	1	0	5

==== Draw 2 ====
Wednesday, September 11, 5:00 pm

Sheet 2	1	2	3	4	5	6	7	8	Final
(Manitoba) Matt Dunstone	0	0	0	2	0	1	0	0	3
(Switzerland) Marco Hösli	1	0	1	0	3	0	0	1	6

Sheet 6	1	2	3	4	5	6	7	8	Final
(Scotland) Team Craik	0	1	0	1	0	1	0	X	3
(China) Xu Xiaoming	0	0	1	0	2	0	3	X	6

==== Draw 3 ====
Wednesday, September 11, 8:00 pm

Sheet 1	1	2	3	4	5	6	7	8	Final
(Sweden) Niklas Edin	0	2	0	0	X	X	X	X	2
(Switzerland) Yannick Schwaller	2	0	3	2	X	X	X	X	7

Sheet 3	1	2	3	4	5	6	7	8	Final
(Switzerland) Yves Stocker	2	0	2	0	1	0	2	X	7
(Quebec) Julien Tremblay	0	2	0	0	0	2	0	X	4

Sheet 4	1	2	3	4	5	6	7	8	Final
(United States) John Shuster	0	1	0	0	2	0	0	0	3
(Italy) Joël Retornaz	0	0	0	1	0	2	1	1	5

Sheet 6	1	2	3	4	5	6	7	8	Final
(Scotland) Kyle Waddell	1	0	2	1	0	0	1	X	5
(Quebec) Félix Asselin	0	2	0	0	3	2	0	X	7

==== Draw 4 ====
Thursday, September 12, 8:00 am

Sheet 4	1	2	3	4	5	6	7	8	Final
(China) Xu Xiaoming	0	1	0	0	2	0	X	X	3
(Ontario) John Epping	1	0	5	0	0	2	X	X	8

Sheet 5	1	2	3	4	5	6	7	8	Final
(Scotland) Team Craik	0	0	2	0	1	0	1	1	5
(Ontario) Scott Howard	0	0	0	1	0	1	0	0	2

Sheet 6	1	2	3	4	5	6	7	8	Final
(Switzerland) Marco Hösli	0	1	0	2	0	2	0	X	5
(Ontario) Mark Kean	0	0	2	0	0	0	0	X	2

==== Draw 5 ====
Thursday, September 12, 11:00 am

Sheet 2	1	2	3	4	5	6	7	8	9	Final
(Sweden) Niklas Edin	0	0	0	0	3	0	2	1	0	6
(Switzerland) Yves Stocker	1	1	1	1	0	2	0	0	2	8

Sheet 3	1	2	3	4	5	6	7	8	Final
(United States) John Shuster	0	0	1	0	1	0	0	X	2
(Scotland) Kyle Waddell	0	1	0	2	0	1	1	X	5

==== Draw 6 ====
Thursday, September 12, 2:00 pm

Sheet 1	1	2	3	4	5	6	7	8	Final
(Switzerland) Marco Hösli	0	0	0	0	0	0	X	X	0
(Netherlands) Wouter Gösgens	1	1	1	1	1	1	X	X	6

Sheet 2	1	2	3	4	5	6	7	8	Final
(Scotland) Ross Whyte	1	2	1	2	1	0	X	X	7
(Ontario) Denis Cordick	0	0	0	0	0	1	X	X	1

Sheet 3	1	2	3	4	5	6	7	8	Final
(Switzerland) Yannick Schwaller	0	2	0	1	1	0	1	2	7
(Quebec) Robert Desjardins	2	0	3	0	0	1	0	0	6

Sheet 6	1	2	3	4	5	6	7	8	Final
(Germany) Marc Muskatewitz	1	0	2	0	1	2	0	1	7
(Quebec) Julien Tremblay	0	1	0	2	0	0	2	0	5

==== Draw 7 ====
Thursday, September 12, 5:00 pm

Sheet 1	1	2	3	4	5	6	7	8	Final
(Scotland) Bruce Mouat	2	4	0	3	X	X	X	X	9
(United States) Team Casper	0	0	1	0	X	X	X	X	1

Sheet 3	1	2	3	4	5	6	7	8	Final
(China) Xu Xiaoming	0	4	0	1	0	1	0	X	6
(Ontario) Scott Howard	0	0	2	0	1	0	1	X	4

==== Draw 8 ====
Thursday, September 12, 8:00 pm

Sheet 1	1	2	3	4	5	6	7	8	9	Final
(Scotland) Team Craik	2	2	1	0	0	1	0	0	1	7
(Ontario) John Epping	0	0	0	2	1	0	2	1	0	6

Sheet 2	1	2	3	4	5	6	7	8	Final
(Netherlands) Wouter Gösgens	1	0	0	1	0	0	0	X	2
(Ontario) Mark Kean	0	4	0	0	0	0	1	X	5

Sheet 4	1	2	3	4	5	6	7	8	Final
(Nova Scotia) Owen Purcell	1	1	0	1	0	0	0	X	3
(Quebec) Félix Asselin	0	0	1	0	1	2	3	X	7

Sheet 5	1	2	3	4	5	6	7	8	Final
(Scotland) Ross Whyte	0	2	0	3	0	1	0	X	6
(Manitoba) Matt Dunstone	1	0	0	0	1	0	1	X	3

Sheet 6	1	2	3	4	5	6	7	8	Final
(Italy) Joël Retornaz	2	0	0	2	0	6	X	X	10
(Quebec) Pierre-Luc Morissette	0	1	0	0	1	0	X	X	2

==== Draw 9 ====
Friday, September 13, 8:00 am

Sheet 2	1	2	3	4	5	6	7	8	Final
(Germany) Marc Muskatewitz	0	2	0	2	1	2	0	X	7
(Quebec) Robert Desjardins	1	0	1	0	0	0	2	X	4

Sheet 5	1	2	3	4	5	6	7	8	Final
(Sweden) Niklas Edin	1	0	2	1	0	1	0	0	5
(Quebec) Julien Tremblay	0	2	0	0	2	0	2	3	9

==== Draw 10 ====
Friday, September 13, 11:00 am

Sheet 1	1	2	3	4	5	6	7	8	Final
(Quebec) Félix Asselin	1	0	4	0	2	X	X	X	7
(Quebec) Pierre-Luc Morissette	0	2	0	1	0	X	X	X	3

Sheet 2	1	2	3	4	5	6	7	8	Final
(Netherlands) Wouter Gösgens	2	0	1	0	3	0	0	X	6
(Ontario) Denis Cordick	0	1	0	1	0	1	1	X	4

Sheet 3	1	2	3	4	5	6	7	8	Final
(Nova Scotia) Owen Purcell	0	1	1	0	0	0	0	X	2
(Italy) Joël Retornaz	1	0	0	3	1	1	2	X	8

Sheet 4	1	2	3	4	5	6	7	8	Final
(Scotland) Ross Whyte	1	0	4	0	1	X	X	X	6
(Ontario) Mark Kean	0	1	0	1	0	X	X	X	2

Sheet 5	1	2	3	4	5	6	7	8	Final
(China) Xu Xiaoming	1	1	0	0	0	1	0	1	4
(United States) Team Casper	0	0	0	1	1	0	1	0	3

==== Draw 11 ====
Friday, September 13, 2:00 pm

Sheet 4	1	2	3	4	5	6	7	8	Final
(Scotland) Bruce Mouat	3	0	0	3	0	X	X	X	6
(Ontario) Scott Howard	0	0	0	0	1	X	X	X	1

==== Draw 12 ====
Friday, September 13, 5:00 pm

Sheet 1	1	2	3	4	5	6	7	8	Final
(Scotland) Team Craik	1	0	2	0	1	0	1	0	5
(United States) Team Casper	0	2	0	3	0	1	0	2	8

Sheet 2	1	2	3	4	5	6	7	8	Final
(Nova Scotia) Owen Purcell	0	3	0	1	0	0	0	X	4
(Scotland) Kyle Waddell	2	0	3	0	2	1	3	X	11

Sheet 3	1	2	3	4	5	6	7	8	Final
(Manitoba) Matt Dunstone	0	2	3	0	1	3	X	X	9
(Ontario) Mark Kean	2	0	0	2	0	0	X	X	4

Sheet 4	1	2	3	4	5	6	7	8	Final
(Switzerland) Yves Stocker	0	2	0	0	1	0	1	0	4
(Quebec) Robert Desjardins	2	0	0	1	0	1	0	1	5

Sheet 5	1	2	3	4	5	6	7	8	Final
(Switzerland) Marco Hösli	3	1	0	3	0	6	X	X	13
(Ontario) Denis Cordick	0	0	2	0	1	0	X	X	3

==== Draw 13 ====
Friday, September 13, 8:00 pm

Sheet 2	1	2	3	4	5	6	7	8	Final
(United States) John Shuster	2	1	0	2	2	0	1	X	8
(Quebec) Pierre-Luc Morissette	0	0	2	0	0	1	0	X	3

Sheet 5	1	2	3	4	5	6	7	8	9	Final
(Scotland) Bruce Mouat	0	0	2	1	0	0	0	2	0	5
(Ontario) John Epping	2	0	0	0	1	2	0	0	1	6

==== Draw 14 ====
Saturday, September 14, 8:00 am

Sheet 2	1	2	3	4	5	6	7	8	Final
(Ontario) Scott Howard	0	0	0	0	0	X	X	X	0
(United States) Team Casper	1	1	0	2	1	X	X	X	5

Sheet 3	1	2	3	4	5	6	7	8	Final
(Switzerland) Yannick Schwaller	0	1	2	0	1	0	0	1	5
(Quebec) Julien Tremblay	0	0	0	2	0	1	0	0	3

Sheet 4	1	2	3	4	5	6	7	8	Final
(Sweden) Niklas Edin	1	1	0	2	2	0	X	X	6
(Quebec) Robert Desjardins	0	0	1	0	0	1	X	X	2

Sheet 6	1	2	3	4	5	6	7	8	Final
(Germany) Marc Muskatewitz	0	1	0	2	2	0	2	X	7
(Switzerland) Yves Stocker	1	0	1	0	0	1	0	X	3

==== Draw 15 ====
Saturday, September 14, 11:00 am

Sheet 4	1	2	3	4	5	6	7	8	Final
(Manitoba) Matt Dunstone	2	0	1	1	1	0	0	X	5
(Ontario) Denis Cordick	0	0	0	0	0	2	0	X	2

Sheet 5	1	2	3	4	5	6	7	8	Final
(Nova Scotia) Owen Purcell	1	0	3	0	3	0	1	X	8
(Quebec) Pierre-Luc Morissette	0	1	0	2	0	1	0	X	4

==== Draw 16 ====
Saturday, September 14, 2:00 pm

Sheet 1	1	2	3	4	5	6	7	8	Final
(Quebec) Julien Tremblay	1	1	2	0	2	0	0	0	6
(Quebec) Robert Desjardins	0	0	0	2	0	2	0	1	5

Sheet 2	1	2	3	4	5	6	7	8	Final
(Scotland) Bruce Mouat	3	0	2	0	2	X	X	X	7
(Scotland) Team Craik	0	1	0	1	0	X	X	X	2

Sheet 4	1	2	3	4	5	6	7	8	9	Final
(Ontario) Scott Howard	0	1	3	0	1	0	1	0	1	7
(Ontario) John Epping	0	0	0	1	0	3	0	2	0	6

==== Draw 17 ====
Saturday, September 14, 5:00 pm

Sheet 1	1	2	3	4	5	6	7	8	Final
(Ontario) Mark Kean	1	4	3	0	X	X	X	X	8
(Ontario) Denis Cordick	0	0	0	1	X	X	X	X	1

Sheet 2	1	2	3	4	5	6	7	8	Final
(Scotland) Ross Whyte	5	0	0	1	0	1	0	X	7
(Switzerland) Marco Hösli	0	1	1	0	1	0	0	X	3

Sheet 3	1	2	3	4	5	6	7	8	Final
(Nova Scotia) Owen Purcell	1	1	0	4	1	X	X	X	7
(United States) John Shuster	0	0	1	0	0	X	X	X	1

Sheet 4	1	2	3	4	5	6	7	8	Final
(Scotland) Kyle Waddell	2	3	0	1	4	X	X	X	10
(Quebec) Pierre-Luc Morissette	0	0	2	0	0	X	X	X	2

Sheet 5	1	2	3	4	5	6	7	8	Final
(Switzerland) Yannick Schwaller	0	1	0	2	0	3	0	X	6
(Germany) Marc Muskatewitz	1	0	1	0	1	0	1	X	4

Sheet 6	1	2	3	4	5	6	7	8	Final
(Manitoba) Matt Dunstone	1	0	1	1	0	2	0	1	6
(Netherlands) Wouter Gösgens	0	2	0	0	1	0	1	0	4

==== Draw 18 ====
Saturday, September 14, 8:00 pm

Sheet 1	1	2	3	4	5	6	7	8	Final
(Italy) Joël Retornaz	1	0	3	0	2	0	2	X	8
(Quebec) Félix Asselin	0	1	0	2	0	2	0	X	5

Sheet 4	1	2	3	4	5	6	7	8	Final
(Scotland) Bruce Mouat	0	0	2	1	0	2	0	2	7
(China) Xu Xiaoming	0	2	0	0	1	0	1	0	4

Sheet 6	1	2	3	4	5	6	7	8	Final
(Ontario) John Epping	2	0	1	3	0	3	X	X	9
(United States) Team Casper	0	2	0	0	1	0	X	X	3

=== Playoffs ===
Quarterfinals
1	(Italy) Joël Retornaz	6
8	(China) Xu Xiaoming	1
4	(Scotland) Bruce Mouat	6
5	(Manitoba) Matt Dunstone	2
2	(Scotland) Ross Whyte	2
7	(Quebec) Félix Asselin	4
3	(Switzerland) Yannick Schwaller	7
6	(Scotland) Kyle Waddell	3

Semifinals
1	(Italy) Joël Retornaz	3
4	(Scotland) Bruce Mouat	4
7	(Quebec) Félix Asselin	4
3	(Switzerland) Yannick Schwaller	6

Final
4	(Scotland) Bruce Mouat	3
3	(Switzerland) Yannick Schwaller	5

==== Quarterfinals ====
Sunday, September 15, 8:30 am

Sheet 1	1	2	3	4	5	6	7	8	Final
(Switzerland) Yannick Schwaller	2	0	1	3	1	0	X	X	7
(Scotland) Kyle Waddell	0	1	0	0	0	2	X	X	3

Sheet 2	1	2	3	4	5	6	7	8	Final
(Scotland) Bruce Mouat	0	3	1	0	2	0	X	X	6
(Manitoba) Matt Dunstone	0	0	0	1	0	1	X	X	2

Sheet 5	1	2	3	4	5	6	7	8	Final
(Scotland) Ross Whyte	0	0	1	0	0	1	0	0	2
(Quebec) Félix Asselin	0	0	0	1	0	0	2	1	4

Sheet 6	1	2	3	4	5	6	7	8	Final
(Italy) Joël Retornaz	2	0	0	0	2	2	X	X	6
(China) Xu Xiaoming	0	0	0	1	0	0	X	X	1

==== Semifinals ====
Sunday, September 15, 12:00 pm

Sheet 3	1	2	3	4	5	6	7	8	9	Final
(Italy) Joël Retornaz	1	0	0	0	0	1	0	1	0	3
(Scotland) Bruce Mouat	0	0	1	1	0	0	1	0	1	4

Sheet 4	1	2	3	4	5	6	7	8	Final
(Quebec) Félix Asselin	0	0	2	0	1	0	1	0	4
(Switzerland) Yannick Schwaller	1	0	0	2	0	2	0	1	6

==== Final ====
Sunday, September 15, 3:30 pm

Sheet 5	1	2	3	4	5	6	7	8	Final
(Scotland) Bruce Mouat	0	0	2	0	0	1	0	0	3
(Switzerland) Yannick Schwaller	1	1	0	1	0	0	1	1	5

== Women ==
=== Teams ===
The teams are listed as follows:

Skip	Third	Second	Lead	Alternate	Locale
Christina Black	Jill Brothers	Marlee Powers (Note: Alternate Marlee Powers played second, replacing Jenn Baxter.)	Karlee Everist		Halifax, Nova Scotia
Hollie Duncan	Megan Balsdon	Rachelle Strybosch	Tess Guyatt	Julie Tippin	Woodstock, Ontario
Satsuki Fujisawa	Chinami Yoshida	Yumi Suzuki	Yurika Yoshida		Kitami, Japan
Gim Eun-ji	Kim Min-ji	Kim Su-ji	Seol Ye-eun	Seol Ye-ji	Uijeongbu, South Korea
Hailey Armstrong (Fourth)	Jennifer Harvey (Skip)	Marie-Elaine Little	Lisa Lalonde		Cornwall, Ontario
Fay Henderson	Robyn Munro	Hailey Duff	Katie McMillan	Lisa Davie	Stirling, Scotland
Rachel Homan	Tracy Fleury	Emma Miskew	Sarah Wilkes		Ottawa, Ontario
Carly Howard	Katelyn Wasylkiw	Lynn Kreviazuk	Laura Hickey		Toronto, Ontario
Corrie Hürlimann	Celine Schwizgebel	Sarah Müller	Marina Lörtscher	Stefanie Berset	Zug, Switzerland
Danielle Inglis	Kira Brunton	Calissa Daly	Cassandra de Groot		Ottawa, Ontario
Kayla MacMillan	Sarah Daniels	Lindsay Dubue	Sarah Loken		Victoria, British Columbia
Lauren Mann	Laura Forget	Candice Jackson	Stephanie Barbeau		North Bay, Ontario
Rebecca Morrison (Fourth)	Jennifer Dodds	Sophie Sinclair	Sophie Jackson (Skip) (Note: Sophie Jackson skipped Team Morrison.)		Stirling, Scotland
Xenia Schwaller	Selina Gafner	Fabienne Rieder	Selina Rychiger		Zurich, Switzerland
Kayla Skrlik	Margot Flemming	Ashton Skrlik	Geri-Lynn Ramsay		Calgary, Alberta
Laurie St-Georges	Jamie Sinclair	Emily Riley	Lisa Weagle		Montreal, Quebec
Alina Pätz (Fourth)	Silvana Tirinzoni (Skip)	Selina Witschonke	Carole Howald		Aarau, Switzerland
Sayaka Yoshimura	Yuna Kotani	Kaho Onodera	Anna Ohmiya	Mina Kobayashi	Sapporo, Japan

=== Round robin standings ===
Final Round Robin Standings

Key
Teams to Playoffs

Pool A	W	L	PF	PA
(Ontario) Rachel Homan	5	0	33	14
(Scotland) Team Morrison	3	2	30	19
(Quebec) Laurie St-Georges	3	2	27	24
(Ontario) Danielle Inglis	3	2	27	26
(Ontario) Jennifer Harvey	1	4	18	29
(Switzerland) Corrie Hürlimann	0	5	12	35

Pool B	W	L	PF	PA
(Japan) Satsuki Fujisawa	5	0	29	14
(Switzerland) Silvana Tirinzoni	4	1	26	9
(Nova Scotia) Christina Black	3	2	29	18
(Japan) Sayaka Yoshimura	2	3	23	25
(Scotland) Fay Henderson	1	4	18	31
(Ontario) Lauren Mann	0	5	10	38

Pool C	W	L	PF	PA
(South Korea) Gim Eun-ji	4	1	37	19
(Alberta) Kayla Skrlik	4	1	39	24
(British Columbia) Kayla MacMillan	3	2	32	27
(Switzerland) Xenia Schwaller	2	3	28	25
(Ontario) Carly Howard	1	4	15	38
(Ontario) Hollie Duncan	1	4	16	34

=== Round robin results ===
All draw times are listed in Eastern Time (UTC−04:00).

==== Draw 1 ====
Wednesday, September 11, 2:00 pm

Sheet 2	1	2	3	4	5	6	7	8	Final
(Scotland) Team Morrison	0	0	0	4	0	1	1	X	6
(Switzerland) Corrie Hürlimann	0	0	0	0	1	0	0	X	1

==== Draw 2 ====
Wednesday, September 11, 5:00 pm

Sheet 1	1	2	3	4	5	6	7	8	Final
(Ontario) Danielle Inglis	1	0	0	0	2	2	0	X	5
(Ontario) Jennifer Harvey	0	0	0	1	0	0	2	X	3

Sheet 3	1	2	3	4	5	6	7	8	Final
(Switzerland) Silvana Tirinzoni	1	2	3	1	0	X	X	X	7
(Scotland) Fay Henderson	0	0	0	0	1	X	X	X	1

Sheet 4	1	2	3	4	5	6	7	8	Final
(Alberta) Kayla Skrlik	2	0	1	1	0	2	3	X	9
(British Columbia) Kayla MacMillan	0	3	0	0	3	0	0	X	6

Sheet 5	1	2	3	4	5	6	7	8	Final
(Switzerland) Xenia Schwaller	1	0	0	0	0	2	0	X	3
(South Korea) Gim Eun-ji	0	0	1	1	3	0	3	X	8

==== Draw 3 ====
Wednesday, September 11, 8:00 pm

Sheet 2	1	2	3	4	5	6	7	8	Final
(Japan) Satsuki Fujisawa	0	0	0	3	0	1	2	X	6
(Japan) Sayaka Yoshimura	0	1	0	0	1	0	0	X	2

Sheet 5	1	2	3	4	5	6	7	8	Final
(Ontario) Rachel Homan	0	0	1	0	2	1	0	2	6
(Scotland) Team Morrison	0	1	0	0	0	0	2	0	3

==== Draw 4 ====
Thursday, September 12, 8:00 am

Sheet 1	1	2	3	4	5	6	7	8	Final
(Switzerland) Corrie Hürlimann	0	1	0	2	0	0	0	X	3
(Quebec) Laurie St-Georges	1	0	2	0	0	2	3	X	8

Sheet 2	1	2	3	4	5	6	7	8	Final
(British Columbia) Kayla MacMillan	0	2	1	0	0	2	1	0	6
(South Korea) Gim Eun-ji	0	0	0	3	0	0	0	2	5

Sheet 3	1	2	3	4	5	6	7	8	Final
(Ontario) Carly Howard	0	1	0	3	0	0	X	X	4
(Alberta) Kayla Skrlik	1	0	2	0	4	3	X	X	10

==== Draw 5 ====
Thursday, September 12, 11:00 am

Sheet 1	1	2	3	4	5	6	7	8	Final
(Japan) Sayaka Yoshimura	0	1	1	0	2	1	2	X	7
(Ontario) Lauren Mann	1	0	0	2	0	0	0	X	3

Sheet 4	1	2	3	4	5	6	7	8	Final
(Scotland) Team Morrison	0	2	0	2	1	0	1	0	6
(Ontario) Danielle Inglis	2	0	2	0	0	1	0	2	7

Sheet 5	1	2	3	4	5	6	7	8	Final
(Scotland) Fay Henderson	0	1	0	1	1	0	0	X	3
(Nova Scotia) Christina Black	2	0	3	0	0	2	2	X	9

Sheet 6	1	2	3	4	5	6	7	8	Final
(Ontario) Rachel Homan	4	0	1	0	2	X	X	X	7
(Ontario) Jennifer Harvey	0	0	0	2	0	X	X	X	2

==== Draw 6 ====
Thursday, September 12, 2:00 pm

Sheet 4	1	2	3	4	5	6	7	8	Final
(Ontario) Carly Howard	0	1	0	1	X	X	X	X	2
(Switzerland) Xenia Schwaller	3	0	5	0	X	X	X	X	8

Sheet 5	1	2	3	4	5	6	7	8	Final
(Alberta) Kayla Skrlik	1	0	0	1	0	2	0	3	7
(Ontario) Hollie Duncan	0	1	0	0	1	0	1	0	3

==== Draw 7 ====
Thursday, September 12, 5:00 pm

Sheet 2	1	2	3	4	5	6	7	8	Final
(Switzerland) Silvana Tirinzoni	0	0	0	0	0	1	0	3	4
(Nova Scotia) Christina Black	0	0	0	0	0	0	2	0	2

Sheet 4	1	2	3	4	5	6	7	8	Final
(Ontario) Rachel Homan	1	0	0	1	2	0	0	1	5
(Quebec) Laurie St-Georges	0	1	1	0	0	1	0	0	3

Sheet 5	1	2	3	4	5	6	7	8	Final
(Japan) Satsuki Fujisawa	0	2	0	0	1	2	0	2	7
(Ontario) Lauren Mann	1	0	2	1	0	0	1	0	5

Sheet 6	1	2	3	4	5	6	7	8	Final
(Scotland) Fay Henderson	0	1	0	2	0	2	0	0	5
(Japan) Sayaka Yoshimura	0	0	3	0	1	0	3	1	8

==== Draw 8 ====
Thursday, September 12, 8:00 pm

Sheet 3	1	2	3	4	5	6	7	8	Final
(Ontario) Hollie Duncan	0	0	1	0	0	X	X	X	1
(South Korea) Gim Eun-ji	1	1	0	4	2	X	X	X	8

==== Draw 9 ====
Friday, September 13, 8:00 am

Sheet 1	1	2	3	4	5	6	7	8	Final
(Switzerland) Xenia Schwaller	0	1	0	1	0	0	1	0	3
(Alberta) Kayla Skrlik	0	0	2	0	1	1	0	2	6

Sheet 3	1	2	3	4	5	6	7	8	Final
(Ontario) Danielle Inglis	3	0	0	0	0	2	1	X	6
(Switzerland) Corrie Hürlimann	0	1	0	1	1	0	0	X	3

Sheet 4	1	2	3	4	5	6	7	8	Final
(Switzerland) Silvana Tirinzoni	2	0	2	1	0	0	X	X	5
(Japan) Sayaka Yoshimura	0	0	0	0	0	1	X	X	1

Sheet 6	1	2	3	4	5	6	7	8	Final
(Quebec) Laurie St-Georges	0	0	1	2	1	0	1	1	6
(Ontario) Jennifer Harvey	1	1	0	0	0	2	0	0	4

==== Draw 10 ====
Friday, September 13, 11:00 am

Sheet 6	1	2	3	4	5	6	7	8	Final
(Japan) Satsuki Fujisawa	0	1	2	1	0	2	0	X	6
(Nova Scotia) Christina Black	0	0	0	0	2	0	2	X	4

==== Draw 11 ====
Friday, September 13, 2:00 pm

Sheet 1	1	2	3	4	5	6	7	8	Final
(British Columbia) Kayla MacMillan	0	0	0	1	0	0	3	0	4
(Ontario) Hollie Duncan	1	0	1	0	2	2	0	1	7

Sheet 2	1	2	3	4	5	6	7	8	Final
(Ontario) Carly Howard	0	0	1	0	1	0	0	X	2
(South Korea) Gim Eun-ji	0	1	0	2	0	3	2	X	8

Sheet 3	1	2	3	4	5	6	7	8	Final
(Scotland) Team Morrison	0	3	2	0	2	1	X	X	8
(Ontario) Jennifer Harvey	1	0	0	1	0	0	X	X	2

Sheet 5	1	2	3	4	5	6	7	8	Final
(Ontario) Danielle Inglis	0	2	0	1	0	1	1	X	5
(Quebec) Laurie St-Georges	1	0	4	0	2	0	0	X	7

Sheet 6	1	2	3	4	5	6	7	8	Final
(Switzerland) Silvana Tirinzoni	2	1	0	0	2	3	X	X	8
(Ontario) Lauren Mann	0	0	1	0	0	0	X	X	1

==== Draw 12 ====
Friday, September 13, 5:00 pm

Sheet 6	1	2	3	4	5	6	7	8	Final
(Ontario) Rachel Homan	0	0	2	0	2	3	1	X	8
(Switzerland) Corrie Hürlimann	0	1	0	1	0	0	0	X	2

==== Draw 13 ====
Friday, September 13, 8:00 pm

Sheet 1	1	2	3	4	5	6	7	8	Final
(Switzerland) Xenia Schwaller	1	0	2	1	0	0	1	X	5
(British Columbia) Kayla MacMillan	0	2	0	0	4	1	0	X	7

Sheet 3	1	2	3	4	5	6	7	8	Final
(Nova Scotia) Christina Black	1	1	1	1	0	4	X	X	8
(Ontario) Lauren Mann	0	0	0	0	0	0	X	X	0

Sheet 4	1	2	3	4	5	6	7	8	Final
(Ontario) Carly Howard	1	0	1	0	3	0	1	X	6
(Ontario) Hollie Duncan	0	1	0	1	0	1	0	X	3

Sheet 6	1	2	3	4	5	6	7	8	Final
(Japan) Satsuki Fujisawa	0	0	0	5	0	1	X	X	6
(Scotland) Fay Henderson	0	0	0	0	1	0	X	X	1

==== Draw 14 ====
Saturday, September 14, 8:00 am

Sheet 1	1	2	3	4	5	6	7	8	Final
(Switzerland) Corrie Hürlimann	0	0	2	0	1	0	0	0	3
(Ontario) Jennifer Harvey	1	1	0	1	0	0	1	3	7

Sheet 5	1	2	3	4	5	6	7	8	Final
(Scotland) Team Morrison	1	0	2	0	1	0	3	X	7
(Quebec) Laurie St-Georges	0	1	0	1	0	1	0	X	3

==== Draw 15 ====
Saturday, September 14, 11:00 am

Sheet 1	1	2	3	4	5	6	7	8	Final
(Switzerland) Silvana Tirinzoni	0	1	0	1	0	0	0	X	2
(Japan) Satsuki Fujisawa	1	0	2	0	0	0	1	X	4

Sheet 2	1	2	3	4	5	6	7	8	Final
(Ontario) Carly Howard	0	0	1	0	0	X	X	X	1
(British Columbia) Kayla MacMillan	1	3	0	2	3	X	X	X	9

Sheet 3	1	2	3	4	5	6	7	8	Final
(Scotland) Fay Henderson	2	1	0	2	3	X	X	X	8
(Ontario) Lauren Mann	0	0	1	0	0	X	X	X	1

Sheet 6	1	2	3	4	5	6	7	8	Final
(Alberta) Kayla Skrlik	0	0	1	0	2	1	3	0	7
(South Korea) Gim Eun-ji	1	1	0	2	0	0	0	4	8

==== Draw 16 ====
Saturday, September 14, 2:00 pm

Sheet 3	1	2	3	4	5	6	7	8	Final
(Switzerland) Xenia Schwaller	3	0	1	1	0	4	X	X	9
(Ontario) Hollie Duncan	0	1	0	0	1	0	X	X	2

Sheet 5	1	2	3	4	5	6	7	8	Final
(Ontario) Rachel Homan	0	0	1	0	2	1	3	X	7
(Ontario) Danielle Inglis	0	2	0	2	0	0	0	X	4

Sheet 6	1	2	3	4	5	6	7	8	Final
(Nova Scotia) Christina Black	0	2	0	3	0	0	0	1	6
(Japan) Sayaka Yoshimura	1	0	1	0	2	0	1	0	5

=== Playoffs ===
Quarterfinals
4	(Switzerland) Silvana Tirinzoni	7
5	(South Korea) Gim Eun-ji	3
2	(Ontario) Rachel Homan	5
7	(Quebec) Laurie St-Georges	2
3	(Alberta) Kayla Skrlik	7
6	(Scotland) Team Morrison	1

Semifinals
1	(Japan) Satsuki Fujisawa	3
4	(Switzerland) Silvana Tirinzoni	4
2	(Ontario) Rachel Homan	7
3	(Alberta) Kayla Skrlik	2

Final
4	(Switzerland) Silvana Tirinzoni	5
2	(Ontario) Rachel Homan	6

==== Quarterfinals ====
Saturday, September 14, 8:00 pm

Sheet 2	1	2	3	4	5	6	7	8	Final
(Ontario) Rachel Homan	0	0	2	0	1	0	1	1	5
(Quebec) Laurie St-Georges	0	0	0	1	0	1	0	0	2

Sheet 3	1	2	3	4	5	6	7	8	Final
(Alberta) Kayla Skrlik	0	2	0	4	0	1	X	X	7
(Scotland) Team Morrison	0	0	1	0	0	0	X	X	1

Sheet 5	1	2	3	4	5	6	7	8	Final
(Switzerland) Silvana Tirinzoni	0	3	0	0	1	0	3	X	7
(South Korea) Gim Eun-ji	1	0	0	0	0	2	0	X	3

==== Semifinals ====
Sunday, September 15, 8:30 am

Sheet 3	1	2	3	4	5	6	7	8	Final
(Japan) Satsuki Fujisawa	0	1	0	0	1	0	1	0	3
(Switzerland) Silvana Tirinzoni	1	0	0	2	0	0	0	1	4

Sheet 4	1	2	3	4	5	6	7	8	Final
(Ontario) Rachel Homan	0	3	1	0	2	1	X	X	7
(Alberta) Kayla Skrlik	1	0	0	1	0	0	X	X	2

==== Final ====
Sunday, September 15, 12:00 pm

Sheet 5	1	2	3	4	5	6	7	8	Final
(Switzerland) Silvana Tirinzoni	0	1	0	2	0	2	0	0	5
(Ontario) Rachel Homan	0	0	2	0	1	0	1	2	6
