= 2024 United States Mixed Doubles Olympic Pre-Trials =

- Host city: Chaska, Minnesota
- Arena: Chaska Curling Center
- Dates: August 8 - 11
- Winner: (Minnesota) Anderson / Stopera
- Female: Sarah Anderson
- Male: Andrew Stopera
- Finalist: (Minnesota) Bear / Oldenburg

The 2024 United States Mixed Doubles Olympic Pre-Trials was held from August 8 to 11, 2024, at the Chaska Curling Center in Chaska, Minnesota. The championship featured ten teams, with a single round-robin, with the top four teams advancing to the 2025 United States Mixed Doubles Curling Olympic Trials.

== Teams ==
The teams are listed as follows:

Female	Male	Locale
Sarah Anderson	Andrew Stopera	Chaska, Minnesota
Taylor Anderson-Heide	Ben Richardson	Chaska, Minnesota
Madison Bear	Aiden Oldenburg	Chaska, Minnesota
Lexi Daly	Luc Violette	Duluth, Minnesota
Cora Farrell	Coleman Thurston	Chaska, Minnesota
Clare Moores	Lance Wheeler	Denver, Colorado
Anne O'Hara	Samuel Strouse	Fairbanks, Alaska
Vicky Persinger	Daniel Casper	Fairbanks, Alaska
Kim Rhyme	Jason Smith	Minneapolis, Minnesota
Delaney Strouse	Mark Fenner	Traverse City, Michigan

== Round robin standings ==
Final round robin standings

Key
Teams to 2025 Olympic Trials
Teams to Tiebreaker

Team	W	L
(Minnesota) Anderson / Stopera	8	1
(Minnesota) Bear / Oldenburg	7	2
(Colorado) Moores / Wheeler	7	2
(Minnesota) Anderson-Heide / Richardson	5	4
(Minnesota) Daly / Violette	5	4
(Alaska) Persinger / Casper	4	5
(Michigan) Strouse / Fenner	4	5
(Minnesota) Rhyme / Smith	3	6
(Minnesota) Farrell / Thurston	1	8
(Alaska) O'Hara / Strouse	1	8

== Round robin results ==
All draws are listed in Central Standard Time (UTC−05:00).

=== Draw 1 ===
Thursday, August 8, 2:30 pm

Sheet 2	1	2	3	4	5	6	7	8	Final
(Minnesota) Bear / Oldenburg	1	1	0	2	0	5	0	X	9
(Colorado) Moores / Wheeler	0	0	1	0	1	0	3	X	5

Sheet 3	1	2	3	4	5	6	7	8	Final
(Minnesota) Daly / Violette	1	0	1	1	0	3	1	0	7
(Minnesota) Farrell / Thurston	0	3	0	0	1	0	0	1	5

Sheet 4	1	2	3	4	5	6	7	8	Final
(Minnesota) Anderson / Stopera	0	1	1	0	1	0	3	0	6
(Minnesota) Rhyme / Smith	1	0	0	1	0	1	0	1	4

Sheet 5	1	2	3	4	5	6	7	8	Final
(Michigan) Strouse / Fenner	2	1	0	5	0	0	2	X	10
(Minnesota) Anderson-Heide / Richardson	0	0	1	0	2	1	0	X	4

Sheet 6	1	2	3	4	5	6	7	8	Final
(Alaska) O'Hara / Strouse	0	0	1	1	0	3	0	1	6
(Alaska) Persinger / Casper	2	1	0	0	2	0	2	0	7

=== Draw 2 ===
Thursday, August 8, 7:30 pm

Sheet 2	1	2	3	4	5	6	7	8	Final
(Minnesota) Anderson-Heide / Richardson	4	0	2	1	0	3	X	X	10
(Alaska) O'Hara / Strouse	0	2	0	0	1	0	X	X	3

Sheet 3	1	2	3	4	5	6	7	8	Final
(Minnesota) Rhyme / Smith	0	0	1	0	1	0	1	X	3
(Michigan) Strouse / Fenner	3	1	0	2	0	2	0	X	8

Sheet 4	1	2	3	4	5	6	7	8	Final
(Alaska) Persinger / Casper	0	0	0	0	0	0	X	X	0
(Minnesota) Daly / Violette	1	1	1	1	2	2	X	X	8

Sheet 5	1	2	3	4	5	6	7	8	Final
(Minnesota) Bear / Oldenburg	2	1	1	0	4	1	X	X	9
(Minnesota) Farrell / Thurston	0	0	0	1	0	0	X	X	1

Sheet 6	1	2	3	4	5	6	7	8	Final
(Minnesota) Anderson / Stopera	0	4	0	4	0	1	0	0	9
(Colorado) Moores / Wheeler	1	0	2	0	3	0	3	1	10

=== Draw 3 ===
Friday, August 9, 9:30 am

Sheet 2	1	2	3	4	5	6	7	8	9	Final
(Michigan) Strouse / Fenner	1	0	1	0	0	2	0	2	0	6
(Minnesota) Anderson / Stopera	0	2	0	1	1	0	2	0	1	7

Sheet 3	1	2	3	4	5	6	7	8	Final
(Alaska) Persinger / Casper	0	0	1	0	1	X	X	X	2
(Minnesota) Bear / Oldenburg	3	2	0	3	0	X	X	X	8

Sheet 4	1	2	3	4	5	6	7	8	Final
(Colorado) Moores / Wheeler	1	1	1	1	1	0	4	X	9
(Minnesota) Farrell / Thurston	0	0	0	0	0	2	0	X	2

Sheet 5	1	2	3	4	5	6	7	8	Final
(Minnesota) Rhyme / Smith	0	0	0	3	1	0	2	0	6
(Alaska) O'Hara / Strouse	1	1	1	0	0	1	0	3	7

Sheet 6	1	2	3	4	5	6	7	8	Final
(Minnesota) Anderson-Heide / Richardson	0	1	0	0	3	0	1	1	6
(Minnesota) Daly / Violette	1	0	1	1	0	1	0	0	4

=== Draw 4 ===
Friday, August 9, 2:30 pm

Sheet 2	1	2	3	4	5	6	7	8	Final
(Alaska) Persinger / Casper	2	1	0	5	0	X	X	X	8
(Minnesota) Farrell / Thurston	0	0	1	0	1	X	X	X	2

Sheet 3	1	2	3	4	5	6	7	8	Final
(Minnesota) Anderson / Stopera	0	3	0	2	0	1	0	1	7
(Minnesota) Anderson-Heide / Richardson	1	0	2	0	1	0	1	0	5

Sheet 4	1	2	3	4	5	6	7	8	9	Final
(Michigan) Strouse / Fenner	0	2	0	3	1	0	1	0	1	8
(Alaska) O'Hara / Strouse	1	0	1	0	0	1	0	4	0	7

Sheet 5	1	2	3	4	5	6	7	8	Final
(Colorado) Moores / Wheeler	0	2	0	2	0	3	1	X	8
(Minnesota) Daly / Violette	1	0	1	0	1	0	0	X	3

Sheet 6	1	2	3	4	5	6	7	8	Final
(Minnesota) Rhyme / Smith	0	1	0	1	0	2	0	0	4
(Minnesota) Bear / Oldenburg	1	0	3	0	2	0	2	2	10

=== Draw 5 ===
Friday, August 9, 7:30 pm

Sheet 2	1	2	3	4	5	6	7	8	Final
(Minnesota) Daly / Violette	2	0	0	2	0	2	0	0	6
(Minnesota) Rhyme / Smith	0	2	1	0	1	0	1	2	7

Sheet 3	1	2	3	4	5	6	7	8	9	Final
(Alaska) O'Hara / Strouse	1	0	2	0	1	0	1	0	0	5
(Colorado) Moores / Wheeler	0	2	0	1	0	1	0	1	1	6

Sheet 4	1	2	3	4	5	6	7	8	Final
(Minnesota) Anderson-Heide / Richardson	1	0	1	0	0	2	0	1	5
(Minnesota) Bear / Oldenburg	0	2	0	1	1	0	2	0	6

Sheet 5	1	2	3	4	5	6	7	8	Final
(Minnesota) Anderson / Stopera	1	0	4	2	0	1	X	X	8
(Alaska) Persinger / Casper	0	1	0	0	1	0	X	X	2

Sheet 6	1	2	3	4	5	6	7	8	Final
(Michigan) Strouse / Fenner	1	4	1	0	5	X	X	X	11
(Minnesota) Farrell / Thurston	0	0	0	1	0	X	X	X	1

=== Draw 6 ===
Saturday, August 10, 9:30 am

Sheet 2	1	2	3	4	5	6	7	8	Final
(Colorado) Moores / Wheeler	1	0	2	0	3	0	0	X	6
(Minnesota) Anderson-Heide / Richardson	0	2	0	2	0	3	2	X	9

Sheet 3	1	2	3	4	5	6	7	8	Final
(Michigan) Strouse / Fenner	0	0	1	1	0	4	0	2	8
(Alaska) Persinger / Casper	2	2	0	0	3	0	2	0	9

Sheet 4	1	2	3	4	5	6	7	8	Final
(Minnesota) Daly / Violette	0	0	3	0	0	0	2	X	5
(Minnesota) Anderson / Stopera	1	2	0	1	3	1	0	X	8

Sheet 5	1	2	3	4	5	6	7	8	Final
(Minnesota) Farrell / Thurston	0	0	1	0	0	1	0	X	2
(Minnesota) Rhyme / Smith	1	1	0	2	1	0	5	X	10

Sheet 6	1	2	3	4	5	6	7	8	Final
(Minnesota) Bear / Oldenburg	2	2	2	1	1	X	X	X	8
(Alaska) O'Hara / Strouse	0	0	0	0	0	X	X	X	0

=== Draw 7 ===
Saturday, August 10, 7:30 pm

Sheet 2	1	2	3	4	5	6	7	8	Final
(Minnesota) Anderson / Stopera	3	1	0	2	0	3	X	X	9
(Minnesota) Bear / Oldenburg	0	0	2	0	2	0	X	X	4

Sheet 3	1	2	3	4	5	6	7	8	9	Final
(Minnesota) Farrell / Thurston	0	1	1	0	0	1	0	3	1	7
(Alaska) O'Hara / Strouse	1	0	0	1	1	0	3	0	0	6

Sheet 4	1	2	3	4	5	6	7	8	Final
(Minnesota) Rhyme / Smith	0	0	1	0	1	1	0	0	3
(Colorado) Moores / Wheeler	1	1	0	1	0	0	1	1	5

Sheet 5	1	2	3	4	5	6	7	8	9	Final
(Minnesota) Daly / Violette	1	0	4	0	0	0	0	1	2	8
(Michigan) Strouse / Fenner	0	1	0	2	1	1	1	0	0	6

Sheet 6	1	2	3	4	5	6	7	8	Final
(Alaska) Persinger / Casper	3	1	1	0	2	0	0	1	8
(Minnesota) Anderson-Heide / Richardson	0	0	0	2	0	1	1	0	4

=== Draw 8 ===
Sunday, August 11, 9:00 am

Sheet 2	1	2	3	4	5	6	7	8	Final
(Alaska) O'Hara / Strouse	0	0	0	2	0	3	0	X	5
(Minnesota) Daly / Violette	1	1	1	0	2	0	4	X	9

Sheet 3	1	2	3	4	5	6	7	8	Final
(Minnesota) Anderson-Heide / Richardson	0	4	0	1	0	1	0	X	6
(Minnesota) Rhyme / Smith	1	0	1	0	1	0	1	X	4

Sheet 4	1	2	3	4	5	6	7	8	Final
(Minnesota) Bear / Oldenburg	0	0	1	0	4	0	2	1	8
(Michigan) Strouse / Fenner	1	1	0	1	0	1	0	0	4

Sheet 5	1	2	3	4	5	6	7	8	Final
(Alaska) Persinger / Casper	0	0	1	0	1	0	0	X	2
(Colorado) Moores / Wheeler	1	1	0	3	0	2	1	X	8

Sheet 6	1	2	3	4	5	6	7	8	Final
(Minnesota) Farrell / Thurston	0	0	0	2	0	0	2	X	4
(Minnesota) Anderson / Stopera	1	1	2	0	1	1	0	X	6

=== Draw 9 ===
Sunday, August 11, 2:00 pm

Sheet 2	1	2	3	4	5	6	7	8	Final
(Minnesota) Rhyme / Smith	2	0	3	0	3	X	X	X	8
(Alaska) Persinger / Casper	0	1	0	1	0	X	X	X	2

Sheet 3	1	2	3	4	5	6	7	8	Final
(Minnesota) Bear / Oldenburg	0	2	1	0	2	0	1	0	6
(Minnesota) Daly / Violette	3	0	0	1	0	3	0	1	8

Sheet 4	1	2	3	4	5	6	7	8	Final
(Minnesota) Farrell / Thurston	0	1	0	1	0	X	X	X	2
(Minnesota) Anderson-Heide / Richardson	3	0	4	0	4	X	X	X	11

Sheet 5	1	2	3	4	5	6	7	8	Final
(Alaska) O'Hara / Strouse	0	0	0	1	1	1	1	X	4
(Minnesota) Anderson / Stopera	1	3	3	0	0	0	0	X	7

Sheet 6	1	2	3	4	5	6	7	8	Final
(Colorado) Moores / Wheeler	1	0	3	0	2	0	1	2	9
(Michigan) Strouse / Fenner	0	2	0	1	0	4	0	0	7

== Tiebreaker ==
Sunday, August 11, 6:00 pm

Team	Final
(Minnesota) Anderson-Heide / Richardson	W
(Minnesota) Daly / Violette	L
