= 2024 Henderson Metal Fall Classic =

- Host city: Sault Ste. Marie, Ontario
- Arena: YNCU Curling Centre
- Dates: October 17–20
- Winner: (Manitoba) Team Dunstone
- Curling club: Fort Rouge CC, Winnipeg
- Skip: Matt Dunstone
- Third: B. J. Neufeld
- Second: Colton Lott
- Lead: Ryan Harnden
- Finalist: (Switzerland) Marco Hösli

The 2024 Henderson Metal Fall Classic was held from October 17 to 20 at the YNCU Curling Centre in Sault Ste. Marie, Ontario. The event was held in a triple-knockout format with a purse of $106,000.

For a second year in a row, the event was won by Manitoba's Matt Dunstone rink who defeated Switzerland's Marco Hösli 7–5 in an extra end final. The Dunstone rink, which includes B. J. Neufeld, Colton Lott and Ryan Harnden led by two in the eighth end before the Swiss tied the game, forcing a ninth end. On his final stone, Dunstone executed a short runback for the win. Both teams qualified for the playoffs through the A bracket with 4–0 records to reach the playoffs. Team Dunstone then won 6–5 over John Epping in the quarterfinals and 9–2 over Joël Retornaz in the semifinals. For Team Hösli, they downed a pair of Canadian teams in Reid Carruthers and Mike McEwen to reach the championship game. Brad Gushue and Mark Kean also qualified for the playoffs but lost in the quarterfinals.

Notably, the event featured many revised lineups following the frenzy of Canadian men's lineup changes throughout early October. Team Gushue, who parted ways with E. J. Harnden on October 10, played with spare Adam Casey while their new second Brendan Bottcher was competing in the Saville Mixed Doubles Classic with Rachel Homan. Team Koe, who cut Jacques Gauthier in late September, only played with three players while their new second Aaron Sluchinski was also competing in Edmonton. Also, second Mark Fenner returned to the Korey Dropkin lineup after not playing in the 2024 Tour Challenge due to injury. He played lead while Thomas Howell moved up to second.

All games from the event were streamed by Curling Stadium, a streaming service provided by CurlingZone. All of the games were streamed on CurlingZone's YouTube page.

== Teams ==
The teams are listed as follows:

Skip	Third	Second	Lead	Alternate	Locale
Tetsuro Shimizu (Fourth)	Shinya Abe (Skip)	Haruto Ouchi	Hayato Sato	Sota Tsuruga	Sapporo, Japan
Reid Carruthers	Catlin Schneider	Derek Samagalski	Connor Njegovan		Winnipeg, Manitoba
Alex Champ	Kevin Flewwelling	Sean Harrison	Zander Elmes		Toronto, Ontario
Korey Dropkin	Andrew Stopera	Thomas Howell (Note: Thomas Howell and Mark Fenner switched positions for the event.)	Mark Fenner		(United States) Duluth, Minnesota
Matt Dunstone	B. J. Neufeld	Colton Lott	Ryan Harnden		Winnipeg, Manitoba
John Epping	Jacob Horgan	Tanner Horgan	Ian McMillan		Sudbury, Ontario
Brad Gushue	Mark Nichols	Geoff Walker (Note: Adam Casey spared for Brendan Bottcher who was competing in the Saville Mixed Doubles Classic with Rachel Homan. He played lead while lead Geoff Walker played second.)	Adam Casey		St. John's, Newfoundland and Labrador
Philipp Hösli (Fourth)	Marco Hösli (Skip)	Simon Gloor	Justin Hausherr		Glarus, Switzerland
Scott Howard	Mat Camm	Jason Camm	Tim March		Navan, Ontario
Matthew Hunt	Nicholas Lemieux	Jake Reid	Kyle Sherlock		Sault Ste. Marie, Ontario
Brad Jacobs	Marc Kennedy	Brett Gallant	Ben Hebert		Calgary, Alberta
Jeong Byeong-jin	Lee Jeong-jae	Kim Min-woo	Kim Jeong-min		Seoul, South Korea
Mark Kean	Brady Lumley	Matthew Garner	Spencer Dunlop		Woodstock, Ontario
Lukáš Klíma	Marek Černovský	Martin Jurík	Lukáš Klípa	Radek Boháč	Prague, Czech Republic
Kevin Koe	Tyler Tardi	– (Note: Team Koe played with three players.)	Karrick Martin		Calgary, Alberta
Sandy MacEwan	Dustin Montpellier	Lee Toner	Luc Ouimet		Sudbury, Ontario
Takumi Maeda	Asei Nakahara	Hiroki Maeda	Uryu Kamikawa	Ryoji Onodera	Tokoro, Japan
Mike McEwen	Colton Flasch	Kevin Marsh	Dan Marsh		Saskatoon, Saskatchewan
Sam Mooibroek	Ryan Wiebe	Scott Mitchell	Nathan Steele		Whitby, Ontario
Yusuke Morozumi	Yuta Matsumura	Ryotaro Shukuya	Masaki Iwai	Kosuke Morozumi	Karuizawa, Japan
Park Jong-duk	Jeong Yeong-seok	Oh Seung-hoon	Lee Ki-bok		Gangwon, South Korea
Magnus Ramsfjell	Martin Sesaker	Bendik Ramsfjell	Gaute Nepstad		Trondheim, Norway
Joël Retornaz	Amos Mosaner	Sebastiano Arman	Mattia Giovanella		Trentino, Italy
Greg Balsdon (Fourth)	Charlie Robert (Skip)	Kyle Chandler	Chris Glibota		Sault Ste. Marie, Ontario
John Shuster	Matt Hamilton	Colin Hufman	John Landsteiner		(United States) Duluth, Minnesota
Tyler Smith	Adam Cocks	Christopher Gallant	Ed White		Crapaud, Prince Edward Island
Andrew Symonds	Trent Skanes	Stephen Trickett	Keith Jewer		St. John's, Newfoundland and Labrador
Nathan Young	Jordan Chandler (Note: Jordan Chandler and Jeff Thomas spared for Colin Thomas, Nathan Locke and Ben Stringer.)	Jeff Thomas	– (Note: Team Young played with three players.)		St. John's, Newfoundland and Labrador

== Knockout Brackets ==
=== A Event ===
First Knockout	Qualifier 1
(Italy) Joël Retornaz	5
(Ontario) John Epping	10	(Ontario) John Epping	4
(Japan) Shinya Abe	2	(Italy) Joël Retornaz	5
(United States) Korey Dropkin	9	(United States) Korey Dropkin	3
(Prince Edward Island) Tyler Smith	3	(United States) Korey Dropkin	8
(Alberta) Kevin Koe	6	(Ontario) Sandy MacEwan	1
(Ontario) Sandy MacEwan	9	(Italy) Joël Retornaz	4
(Manitoba) Matt Dunstone	8
(Saskatchewan) Mike McEwen	8
(South Korea) Park Jong-duk	3	(Ontario) Mark Kean	7
(Ontario) Mark Kean	7	(Saskatchewan) Mike McEwen	2
(Norway) Magnus Ramsfjell	8	(Manitoba) Matt Dunstone	6
(Ontario) Alex Champ	3	(Norway) Magnus Ramsfjell	2
(Manitoba) Matt Dunstone	7	(Manitoba) Matt Dunstone	8
(Ontario) Matthew Hunt	3

First Knockout	Qualifier 2
(Alberta) Brad Jacobs	5
(Ontario) Sam Mooibroek	2	(Czech Republic) Lukáš Klíma	6
(Czech Republic) Lukáš Klíma	9	(Czech Republic) Lukáš Klíma	6
(Japan) Yusuke Morozumi	6	(Manitoba) Reid Carruthers	4
(South Korea) Jeong Byeong-jin	3	(Japan) Yusuke Morozumi	5
(Manitoba) Reid Carruthers	7	(Manitoba) Reid Carruthers	6
(Ontario) Charlie Robert	4	(Czech Republic) Lukáš Klíma	0
(Switzerland) Marco Hösli	7
(Newfoundland and Labrador) Brad Gushue	2
(Ontario) Scott Howard	10	(Ontario) Scott Howard	4
(Japan) Takumi Maeda	1	(Ontario) Scott Howard	2
(Switzerland) Marco Hösli	7	(Switzerland) Marco Hösli	4
(Newfoundland and Labrador) Nathan Young	2	(Switzerland) Marco Hösli	7
(United States) John Shuster	7	(United States) John Shuster	4
(Newfoundland and Labrador) Andrew Symonds	3

=== B Event ===
Second Knockout	To Qualifier 3
(Japan) Shinya Abe	7
(Ontario) Mark Kean	8
(Ontario) Mark Kean	7
(Manitoba) Reid Carruthers	2
(Ontario) Mark Kean	7
(Ontario) Scott Howard	3
(Norway) Magnus Ramsfjell	7
(Prince Edward Island) Tyler Smith	1	(Alberta) Kevin Koe	6
(Alberta) Kevin Koe	8	(Norway) Magnus Ramsfjell	3	Qualifier 3
(Ontario) Scott Howard	6
(Ontario) Mark Kean	9
(Ontario) John Epping	4

Second Knockout	To Qualifier 3
(South Korea) Park Jong-duk	0
(Ontario) John Epping	8
(Ontario) John Epping	7
(Ontario) Sandy MacEwan	1
(Ontario) Sandy MacEwan	7
(Ontario) Alex Champ	8	(Ontario) Alex Champ	2
(Ontario) Matthew Hunt	7	(Ontario) John Epping	5
(Italy) Joël Retornaz	2

Second Knockout	To Qualifier 4
(Ontario) Sam Mooibroek	4
(Newfoundland and Labrador) Brad Gushue	5
(Newfoundland and Labrador) Brad Gushue	5
(United States) Korey Dropkin	4
(Newfoundland and Labrador) Brad Gushue	5
(Saskatchewan) Mike McEwen	6
(United States) John Shuster	5
(South Korea) Jeong Byeong-jin	7	(South Korea) Jeong Byeong-jin	4
(Ontario) Charlie Robert	1	(United States) John Shuster	5	Qualifier 4
(Saskatchewan) Mike McEwen	6
(Saskatchewan) Mike McEwen	4
(Czech Republic) Lukáš Klíma	3

Second Knockout	To Qualifier 4
(Japan) Takumi Maeda	3
(Alberta) Brad Jacobs	5
(Alberta) Brad Jacobs	2
(Japan) Yusuke Morozumi	7
(Japan) Yusuke Morozumi	7
(Newfoundland and Labrador) Nathan Young	2	(Newfoundland and Labrador) Andrew Symonds	4
(Newfoundland and Labrador) Andrew Symonds	8	(Japan) Yusuke Morozumi	5
(Czech Republic) Lukáš Klíma	8

=== C Event ===
Third Knockout	Qualifier 5
(United States) Korey Dropkin	7
(United States) John Shuster	6
(United States) Korey Dropkin	2
(Alberta) Brad Jacobs	5
(Alberta) Brad Jacobs	8
(Prince Edward Island) Tyler Smith	4	(Prince Edward Island) Tyler Smith	1
(Ontario) Matthew Hunt	3	(Alberta) Brad Jacobs	6
(Ontario) John Epping	7

Third Knockout	Qualifier 6
(Japan) Takumi Maeda	8
(Newfoundland and Labrador) Andrew Symonds	5	(Japan) Takumi Maeda	1
(Italy) Joël Retornaz	9
(Italy) Joël Retornaz	6
(Ontario) Sam Mooibroek	7	(Ontario) Scott Howard	3
(South Korea) Jeong Byeong-jin	4	(Ontario) Sam Mooibroek	5
(Ontario) Scott Howard	6

Third Knockout	Qualifier 7
(South Korea) Park Jong-duk	4
(Ontario) Alex Champ	5	(Ontario) Alex Champ	4
(Japan) Yusuke Morozumi	7
(Japan) Yusuke Morozumi	6
(Japan) Shinya Abe	8	(Newfoundland and Labrador) Brad Gushue	7
(Alberta) Kevin Koe	3	(Japan) Shinya Abe	6
(Newfoundland and Labrador) Brad Gushue	8

Third Knockout	Qualifier 8
(Norway) Magnus Ramsfjell	6
(Ontario) Sandy MacEwan	3
(Norway) Magnus Ramsfjell	4
(Manitoba) Reid Carruthers	8
(Manitoba) Reid Carruthers	9
(Ontario) Charlie Robert	6	(Ontario) Charlie Robert	2
(Newfoundland and Labrador) Nathan Young	5	(Manitoba) Reid Carruthers	7
(Czech Republic) Lukáš Klíma	4

== Knockout Results ==
All draw times are listed in Eastern Time (UTC−04:00).

=== Draw 1 ===
Thursday, October 17, 9:00 am

Sheet A	1	2	3	4	5	6	7	8	Final
(Norway) Magnus Ramsfjell	0	1	1	6	0	X	X	X	8
(Ontario) Alex Champ 🔨	2	0	0	0	1	X	X	X	3

Sheet B	1	2	3	4	5	6	7	8	Final
(South Korea) Park Jong-duk	0	1	1	0	0	1	0	X	3
(Ontario) Mark Kean 🔨	2	0	0	3	1	0	1	X	7

Sheet C	1	2	3	4	5	6	7	8	Final
(United States) Korey Dropkin	0	2	1	0	3	0	3	X	9
(Prince Edward Island) Tyler Smith 🔨	1	0	0	1	0	1	0	X	3

Sheet D	1	2	3	4	5	6	7	8	9	Final
(Alberta) Kevin Koe	0	2	0	2	0	0	0	2	0	6
(Ontario) Sandy MacEwan 🔨	1	0	2	0	0	2	1	0	3	9

Sheet E	1	2	3	4	5	6	7	8	Final
(Manitoba) Matt Dunstone 🔨	3	0	2	0	2	0	X	X	7
(Ontario) Matthew Hunt	0	1	0	1	0	1	X	X	3

Sheet F	1	2	3	4	5	6	7	8	Final
(Ontario) John Epping 🔨	0	2	0	2	0	6	X	X	10
(Japan) Shinya Abe	0	0	1	0	1	0	X	X	2

=== Draw 2 ===
Thursday, October 17, 12:30 pm

Sheet A	1	2	3	4	5	6	7	8	Final
(Ontario) Sam Mooibroek 🔨	1	0	0	0	1	0	X	X	2
(Czech Republic) Lukáš Klíma	0	1	1	4	0	3	X	X	9

Sheet B	1	2	3	4	5	6	7	8	Final
(Japan) Yusuke Morozumi 🔨	2	0	1	0	2	1	0	X	6
(South Korea) Jeong Byeong-jin	0	2	0	1	0	0	0	X	3

Sheet C	1	2	3	4	5	6	7	8	Final
(Manitoba) Reid Carruthers 🔨	4	0	0	2	0	1	0	X	7
(Ontario) Charlie Robert	0	1	0	0	2	0	1	X	4

Sheet D	1	2	3	4	5	6	7	8	Final
(Ontario) Scott Howard 🔨	1	0	0	0	0	4	5	X	10
(Japan) Takumi Maeda	0	0	0	1	0	0	0	X	1

Sheet E	1	2	3	4	5	6	7	8	Final
(Switzerland) Marco Hösli	1	0	3	2	0	1	X	X	7
(Newfoundland and Labrador) Nathan Young 🔨	0	1	0	0	1	0	X	X	2

Sheet F	1	2	3	4	5	6	7	8	Final
(United States) John Shuster 🔨	0	2	0	3	2	0	X	X	7
(Newfoundland and Labrador) Andrew Symonds	0	0	2	0	0	1	X	X	3

=== Draw 3 ===
Thursday, October 17, 4:00 pm

Sheet A	1	2	3	4	5	6	7	8	Final
(Saskatchewan) Mike McEwen	1	0	0	2	0	2	0	3	8
(Ontario) Mark Kean 🔨	0	3	1	0	2	0	1	0	7

Sheet B	1	2	3	4	5	6	7	8	Final
(United States) Korey Dropkin 🔨	0	2	0	2	3	1	X	X	8
(Ontario) Sandy MacEwan	0	0	1	0	0	0	X	X	1

Sheet C	1	2	3	4	5	6	7	8	Final
(Italy) Joël Retornaz 🔨	1	0	1	1	0	1	0	1	5
(Ontario) John Epping	0	1	0	0	1	0	2	0	4

Sheet D	1	2	3	4	5	6	7	8	Final
(Norway) Magnus Ramsfjell	0	0	2	0	X	X	X	X	2
(Manitoba) Matt Dunstone 🔨	4	1	0	3	X	X	X	X	8

Sheet E	1	2	3	4	5	6	7	8	Final
(Prince Edward Island) Tyler Smith	0	0	1	0	X	X	X	X	1
(Alberta) Kevin Koe 🔨	5	1	0	2	X	X	X	X	8

Sheet F	1	2	3	4	5	6	7	8	Final
(Ontario) Alex Champ 🔨	0	0	1	3	0	1	0	3	8
(Ontario) Matthew Hunt	1	1	0	0	2	0	3	0	7

=== Draw 4 ===
Thursday, October 17, 7:30 pm

Sheet A	1	2	3	4	5	6	7	8	9	Final
(Switzerland) Marco Hösli	0	1	0	0	0	1	0	2	3	7
(United States) John Shuster 🔨	1	0	1	0	1	0	1	0	0	4

Sheet B	1	2	3	4	5	6	7	8	Final
(Newfoundland and Labrador) Nathan Young 🔨	1	0	0	1	0	0	0	X	2
(Newfoundland and Labrador) Andrew Symonds	0	2	0	0	1	1	4	X	8

Sheet C	1	2	3	4	5	6	7	8	Final
(Newfoundland and Labrador) Brad Gushue 🔨	1	0	0	0	1	0	0	X	2
(Ontario) Scott Howard	0	0	0	2	0	1	1	X	4

Sheet D	1	2	3	4	5	6	7	8	Final
(South Korea) Jeong Byeong-jin 🔨	0	4	3	0	X	X	X	X	7
(Ontario) Charlie Robert	0	0	0	1	X	X	X	X	1

Sheet E	1	2	3	4	5	6	7	8	Final
(Alberta) Brad Jacobs	0	2	0	0	2	1	0	0	5
(Czech Republic) Lukáš Klíma 🔨	1	0	0	2	0	0	2	1	6

Sheet F	1	2	3	4	5	6	7	8	9	Final
(Japan) Yusuke Morozumi	0	1	0	2	0	1	0	1	0	5
(Manitoba) Reid Carruthers 🔨	2	0	2	0	0	0	1	0	1	6

=== Draw 5 ===
Friday, October 18, 9:00 am

Sheet A	1	2	3	4	5	6	7	8	Final
(Norway) Magnus Ramsfjell 🔨	3	0	2	0	2	0	0	X	7
(Alberta) Kevin Koe	0	3	0	1	0	0	2	X	6

Sheet B	1	2	3	4	5	6	7	8	Final
(Japan) Shinya Abe	0	1	0	0	3	0	3	0	7
(Ontario) Mark Kean 🔨	1	0	2	1	0	3	0	1	8

Sheet C	1	2	3	4	5	6	7	8	Final
(Saskatchewan) Mike McEwen	1	0	1	0	0	0	0	X	2
(Manitoba) Matt Dunstone 🔨	0	1	0	0	1	3	1	X	6

Sheet D	1	2	3	4	5	6	7	8	9	Final
(Czech Republic) Lukáš Klíma 🔨	0	0	1	0	0	3	0	0	2	6
(Manitoba) Reid Carruthers	0	0	0	2	0	0	1	1	0	4

Sheet E	1	2	3	4	5	6	7	8	Final
(Italy) Joël Retornaz 🔨	1	1	1	0	0	0	2	X	5
(United States) Korey Dropkin	0	0	0	0	2	1	0	X	3

Sheet F	1	2	3	4	5	6	7	8	Final
(Ontario) Scott Howard 🔨	1	0	0	1	0	0	0	X	2
(Switzerland) Marco Hösli	0	2	1	0	0	1	0	X	4

=== Draw 6 ===
Friday, October 18, 12:30 pm

Sheet A	1	2	3	4	5	6	7	8	Final
(South Korea) Park Jong-duk	0	0	0	X	X	X	X	X	0
(Ontario) John Epping 🔨	6	1	1	X	X	X	X	X	8

Sheet B	1	2	3	4	5	6	7	8	Final
(Ontario) Sam Mooibroek	0	1	0	1	0	1	1	0	4
(Newfoundland and Labrador) Brad Gushue 🔨	1	0	3	0	1	0	0	0	5

Sheet C	1	2	3	4	5	6	7	8	Final
(Ontario) Sandy MacEwan	0	0	2	1	1	0	3	X	7
(Ontario) Alex Champ 🔨	0	1	0	0	0	1	0	X	2

Sheet D	1	2	3	4	5	6	7	8	Final
(Japan) Yusuke Morozumi	2	0	1	0	0	3	0	1	7
(Newfoundland and Labrador) Andrew Symonds 🔨	0	1	0	1	1	0	1	0	4

Sheet E	1	2	3	4	5	6	7	8	Final
(United States) John Shuster 🔨	2	0	0	0	2	0	0	1	5
(South Korea) Jeong Byeong-jin	0	0	1	1	0	1	1	0	4

Sheet F	1	2	3	4	5	6	7	8	Final
(Japan) Takumi Maeda	1	0	1	0	0	0	1	0	3
(Alberta) Brad Jacobs 🔨	0	2	0	1	0	1	0	1	5

=== Draw 7 ===
Friday, October 18, 4:00 pm

Sheet A	1	2	3	4	5	6	7	8	Final
(Czech Republic) Lukáš Klíma	0	0	0	0	X	X	X	X	0
(Switzerland) Marco Hösli 🔨	3	1	1	2	X	X	X	X	7

Sheet B	1	2	3	4	5	6	7	8	Final
(Norway) Magnus Ramsfjell	0	0	2	0	1	0	0	0	3
(Ontario) Scott Howard 🔨	0	1	0	2	0	0	1	2	6

Sheet C	1	2	3	4	5	6	7	8	Final
(Ontario) Mark Kean 🔨	0	0	3	3	1	X	X	X	7
(Manitoba) Reid Carruthers	0	2	0	0	0	X	X	X	2

Sheet D	1	2	3	4	5	6	7	8	Final
(Prince Edward Island) Tyler Smith	0	1	1	0	2	0	0	X	4
(Ontario) Matthew Hunt 🔨	1	0	0	1	0	1	0	X	3

Sheet E	1	2	3	4	5	6	7	8	9	Final
(Ontario) Charlie Robert 🔨	1	1	0	1	0	2	0	0	1	6
(Newfoundland and Labrador) Nathan Young	0	0	1	0	1	0	2	1	0	5

Sheet F	1	2	3	4	5	6	7	8	Final
(Italy) Joël Retornaz	1	0	1	2	0	0	0	X	4
(Manitoba) Matt Dunstone 🔨	0	1	0	0	3	2	2	X	8

=== Draw 8 ===
Friday, October 18, 7:30 pm

Sheet A	1	2	3	4	5	6	7	8	9	Final
(United States) John Shuster	0	1	0	0	2	0	0	2	0	5
(Saskatchewan) Mike McEwen 🔨	2	0	0	1	0	1	1	0	1	6

Sheet B	1	2	3	4	5	6	7	8	Final
(Japan) Takumi Maeda 🔨	3	2	0	2	0	0	1	X	8
(Newfoundland and Labrador) Andrew Symonds	0	0	2	0	3	0	0	X	5

Sheet C	1	2	3	4	5	6	7	8	Final
(Alberta) Brad Jacobs 🔨	0	1	0	1	0	0	X	X	2
(Japan) Yusuke Morozumi	1	0	2	0	3	1	X	X	7

Sheet D	1	2	3	4	5	6	7	8	9	10	Final
(Newfoundland and Labrador) Brad Gushue 🔨	0	1	0	0	2	0	0	1	0	1	5
(United States) Korey Dropkin	0	0	3	0	0	0	1	0	0	0	4

Sheet E	1	2	3	4	5	6	7	8	Final
(Japan) Shinya Abe 🔨	2	2	0	2	0	2	X	X	8
(Alberta) Kevin Koe	0	0	2	0	1	0	X	X	3

Sheet F	1	2	3	4	5	6	7	8	Final
(Ontario) John Epping 🔨	2	0	0	0	4	1	X	X	7
(Ontario) Sandy MacEwan	0	0	1	0	0	0	X	X	1

=== Draw 9 ===
Saturday, October 19, 9:00 am

Sheet A	1	2	3	4	5	6	7	8	Final
(Alberta) Brad Jacobs 🔨	0	0	4	0	4	X	X	X	8
(Prince Edward Island) Tyler Smith	0	0	0	1	0	X	X	X	1

Sheet B	1	2	3	4	5	6	7	8	Final
(Ontario) John Epping 🔨	0	2	0	2	0	0	1	X	5
(Italy) Joël Retornaz	0	0	1	0	0	1	0	X	2

Sheet C	1	2	3	4	5	6	7	8	9	Final
(United States) Korey Dropkin 🔨	1	0	0	2	0	3	0	0	1	7
(United States) John Shuster	0	0	2	0	2	0	1	1	0	6

Sheet D	1	2	3	4	5	6	7	8	Final
(Japan) Yusuke Morozumi	0	0	2	1	0	2	0	X	5
(Czech Republic) Lukáš Klíma 🔨	1	1	0	0	2	0	4	X	8

Sheet E	1	2	3	4	5	6	7	8	Final
(Newfoundland and Labrador) Brad Gushue 🔨	0	0	2	0	2	0	1	0	5
(Saskatchewan) Mike McEwen	0	1	0	2	0	2	0	1	6

Sheet F	1	2	3	4	5	6	7	8	Final
(Ontario) Mark Kean	1	0	2	0	0	3	1	X	7
(Ontario) Scott Howard 🔨	0	1	0	2	0	0	0	X	3

=== Draw 10 ===
Saturday, October 19, 12:30 pm

Sheet A	1	2	3	4	5	6	7	8	Final
(Norway) Magnus Ramsfjell 🔨	2	0	1	0	2	1	0	X	6
(Ontario) Sandy MacEwan	0	1	0	1	0	0	1	X	3

Sheet B	1	2	3	4	5	6	7	8	Final
(Manitoba) Reid Carruthers 🔨	2	1	2	0	4	X	X	X	9
(Ontario) Charlie Robert	0	0	0	2	0	X	X	X	2

Sheet C	1	2	3	4	5	6	7	8	Final
(Japan) Takumi Maeda	0	1	0	0	0	X	X	X	1
(Italy) Joël Retornaz 🔨	3	0	3	1	2	X	X	X	9

Sheet D	1	2	3	4	5	6	7	8	Final
(Ontario) Sam Mooibroek 🔨	0	1	0	1	0	3	0	2	7
(South Korea) Jeong Byeong-jin	1	0	1	0	2	0	0	0	4

Sheet E	1	2	3	4	5	6	7	8	Final
(South Korea) Park Jong-duk	0	2	0	1	0	0	0	1	4
(Ontario) Alex Champ 🔨	1	0	1	0	1	2	0	0	5

Sheet F	1	2	3	4	5	6	7	8	Final
(United States) Korey Dropkin	0	0	0	1	0	1	0	X	2
(Alberta) Brad Jacobs 🔨	0	2	0	0	1	0	2	X	5

=== Draw 11 ===
Saturday, October 19, 4:00 pm

Sheet A	1	2	3	4	5	6	7	8	Final
(Ontario) Mark Kean	0	1	1	1	0	4	0	2	9
(Ontario) John Epping 🔨	1	0	0	0	3	0	0	0	4

Sheet B	1	2	3	4	5	6	7	8	Final
(Ontario) Alex Champ	0	2	0	1	0	0	1	X	4
(Japan) Yusuke Morozumi 🔨	1	0	2	0	0	4	0	X	7

Sheet C	1	2	3	4	5	6	7	8	Final
(Japan) Shinya Abe 🔨	3	0	2	0	0	1	0	0	6
(Newfoundland and Labrador) Brad Gushue	0	3	0	3	1	0	0	1	8

Sheet D	1	2	3	4	5	6	7	8	Final
(Norway) Magnus Ramsfjell 🔨	2	0	1	0	1	0	0	0	4
(Manitoba) Reid Carruthers	0	1	0	2	0	2	0	3	8

Sheet E	1	2	3	4	5	6	7	8	Final
(Ontario) Sam Mooibroek 🔨	1	0	2	0	1	0	1	0	5
(Ontario) Scott Howard	0	2	0	1	0	2	0	1	6

Sheet F	1	2	3	4	5	6	7	8	9	Final
(Saskatchewan) Mike McEwen 🔨	1	0	0	1	0	0	1	0	1	4
(Czech Republic) Lukáš Klíma	0	0	1	0	0	0	0	2	0	3

=== Draw 12 ===
Saturday, October 19, 7:30 pm

Sheet A	1	2	3	4	5	6	7	8	Final
(Manitoba) Reid Carruthers	1	0	3	0	1	0	2	X	7
(Czech Republic) Lukáš Klíma 🔨	0	2	0	1	0	1	0	X	4

Sheet B	1	2	3	4	5	6	7	8	Final
(Alberta) Brad Jacobs 🔨	2	0	1	0	0	0	2	1	6
(Ontario) John Epping	0	2	0	2	1	2	0	0	7

Sheet E	1	2	3	4	5	6	7	8	9	Final
(Japan) Yusuke Morozumi	0	0	0	2	0	2	0	2	0	6
(Newfoundland and Labrador) Brad Gushue 🔨	0	0	3	0	1	0	2	0	1	7

Sheet F	1	2	3	4	5	6	7	8	Final
(Italy) Joël Retornaz	0	0	0	3	0	0	3	X	6
(Ontario) Scott Howard 🔨	0	1	0	0	1	1	0	X	3

== Playoffs ==
Quarterfinals
A1	(Manitoba) Matt Dunstone	6
C1	(Ontario) John Epping	5
B1	(Ontario) Mark Kean	3
C2	(Italy) Joël Retornaz	5
B2	(Saskatchewan) Mike McEwen	5
C3	(Newfoundland and Labrador) Brad Gushue	4
A2	(Switzerland) Marco Hösli	7
C4	(Manitoba) Reid Carruthers	2

Semifinals
A1	(Manitoba) Matt Dunstone	9
C2	(Italy) Joël Retornaz	2
B2	(Saskatchewan) Mike McEwen	0
A2	(Switzerland) Marco Hösli	6

Final
A1	(Manitoba) Matt Dunstone	7
A2	(Switzerland) Marco Hösli	5

=== Quarterfinals ===
Sunday, October 20, 8:30 am

Sheet A	1	2	3	4	5	6	7	8	9	Final
(Manitoba) Matt Dunstone 🔨	0	2	0	0	2	0	1	0	1	6
(Ontario) John Epping	0	0	1	0	0	1	0	3	0	5

Sheet B	1	2	3	4	5	6	7	8	Final
(Saskatchewan) Mike McEwen 🔨	0	2	0	1	0	0	2	0	5
(Newfoundland and Labrador) Brad Gushue	0	0	2	0	1	0	0	1	4

Sheet E	1	2	3	4	5	6	7	8	9	Final
(Ontario) Mark Kean 🔨	0	1	0	0	1	0	0	1	0	3
(Italy) Joël Retornaz	0	0	2	0	0	1	0	0	2	5

Sheet F	1	2	3	4	5	6	7	8	Final
(Switzerland) Marco Hösli 🔨	1	0	1	0	0	0	2	3	7
(Manitoba) Reid Carruthers	0	1	0	0	1	0	0	0	2

=== Semifinals ===
Sunday, October 20, 12:30 pm

Sheet A	1	2	3	4	5	6	7	8	Final
(Saskatchewan) Mike McEwen	0	0	0	0	0	0	0	X	0
(Switzerland) Marco Hösli 🔨	0	0	2	1	1	0	2	X	6

Sheet B	1	2	3	4	5	6	7	8	Final
(Manitoba) Matt Dunstone 🔨	0	5	1	3	X	X	X	X	9
(Italy) Joël Retornaz	2	0	0	0	X	X	X	X	2

=== Final ===
Sunday, October 20, 4:00 pm

Sheet A	1	2	3	4	5	6	7	8	9	Final
(Manitoba) Matt Dunstone 🔨	1	0	1	0	2	0	1	0	2	7
(Switzerland) Marco Hösli	0	2	0	1	0	0	0	2	0	5
