= Lauren Peskett =

Canadian curler

- Curler
- Born: July 21, 1995 (age 31); Pakenham, Ontario

Team
- Skip: Chelsea Principi
- Third: Lauren Peskett
- Second: Brenda Chapman
- Lead: Keira McLaughlin

Curling career
- Member Association: Ontario (2011-2020; 2024-Present); Quebec (2020–2024)
- Top CTRS ranking: 14th (2025–26)
Medal record
Curling
Representing Canada
Winter Universiade
Silver medal – second place	2015 Granada
Representing Ontario
Canada Winter Games
Bronze medal – third place	2011 Halifax

Lauren Peskett (née Horton; born July 21, 1995) is a Canadian curler from Pakenham, Ontario.

== Career ==
=== Juniors ===
Peskett's Huntley Curling Club rink won the 2011 provincial bantam championship. This qualified her team to represent Ontario at the 2011 Canada Winter Games, where she would take home the bronze medal. She won the provincial junior mixed championship in 2014, throwing third stones for Ryan McCrady. While attending Carleton University, Peskett won the 2014 CIS/CCA Curling Championships playing third for the Carleton Ravens team, skipped by Jamie Sinclair. The team represented Canada at the 2015 Winter Universiade, with Sinclair replaced by Breanne Meakin from the University of Manitoba (Sinclair had committed to curling for the United States at this point). The team would end up winning the silver medal.

=== Women's ===
Peskett joined the Susan Froud rink in 2017, throwing third rocks for the team. She won her first World Curling Tour event as a member of the team at the 2017 Stroud Sleeman Cash Spiel. The team qualified for the 2019 Ontario Scotties Tournament of Hearts, Peskett's first provincial women's championship. There, Peskett took over as the team's skip.

Peskett left Ontario in 2020 to form a new team out of Quebec, where they qualified for the 2024 Quebec Scotties Tournament of Hearts, where her team lost in the tie-breaker.

Peskett would return to Ontario to play third for Chelsea Principi. In the 2026–27 curling season, they would find success winning the Grand Slam of Curling Satellite event at the 2026 Swiss Chalet Women's Curling Stadium Spiel by going undefeated in the event and beating South Korea's Kim Kyeong-ae 10–3 in the final. This qualified Team Principi for their first official Grand Slam at the 2026 GSOC Open.

== Personal life ==
Peskett attended Almonte District High School.
