= Henderson Metal Fall Classic =

- Established: 2023
- Host city: Sault Ste. Marie, Ontario
- Arena: YNCU Curling Centre
- Purse: $100,000
- 2026 champion: (Manitoba) John Epping

Current edition
- 2026 Henderson Metal Fall Classic

The Henderson Metal Curling Classic presented by Kioti Tractors of Ontario is an annual bonspiel on the men's curling tour. It is held annually in October at the YNCU Curling Centre in Sault Ste. Marie, Ontario. It was first held in 2023 under the name Soo Curlers Fall Classic with a purse of $90,000.

With a purse of $100,000, it has one of the highest purses on the tour and attracts some of the top curling teams in the world. In 2024, twelve of the top twenty teams in the world competed in the event.

== Previous names ==
- 2023: Soo Curlers Fall Classic
- 2024–present: Henderson Metal Fall Classic

== Past champions ==
Year	Winning team	Runner up team	Purse (CAD)	Winner's share (CAD)
2023	(Manitoba) Matt Dunstone, B. J. Neufeld, Colton Lott, Ryan Harnden	(Italy) Joël Retornaz, Amos Mosaner, Sebastiano Arman, Mattia Giovanella	$90,000	$23,000
2024	(Manitoba) Matt Dunstone, B. J. Neufeld, Colton Lott, Ryan Harnden	(Switzerland) Philipp Hösli (Fourth), Marco Hösli (Skip), Simon Gloor, Justin Hausherr	$106,000	$25,000
2025	(United States) Luc Violette (Fourth), Ben Richardson, Aidan Oldenburg, Rich Ruohonen (Skip)	(Italy) Joël Retornaz, Amos Mosaner, Sebastiano Arman, Mattia Giovanella	$106,000	$25,000
2026	(Manitoba) John Epping, B. J. Neufeld, Ryan Wiebe, Ian McMillan	(Italy) Joël Retornaz, Stefano Gilli, Andrea Gilli, Alberto Pimpini	$100,000	$21,000
