= 2026 Swiss Chalet Women's Curling Stadium Spiel =

- Host city: North Bay, Ontario
- Arena: North Bay Granite Club
- Dates: November 5–8
- Winner: (Ontario) Team Principi
- Curling club: Niagara Falls CC, Niagara Falls
- Skip: Chelsea Principi
- Third: Lauren Peskett
- Second: Brenda Chapman
- Lead: Keira McLaughlin
- Finalist: (South Korea) Team Kang

The 2026 Swiss Chalet Women's Curling Stadium Spiel was held from November 5 to 8 at the North Bay Granite Club in North Bay, Ontario. The event was held in a round robin format, with a purse of $10,000.

For the 2026–27 season, the event was a satellite Grand Slam of Curling event. The highest ranking non-qualified team earned a spot at the 2026 GSOC Open, the fourth Grand Slam of the season. As winners of the tournament, Team Chelsea Principi qualified for their first ever Grand Slam event.

== Teams ==
The teams are listed as follows:

| Skip | Third | Second | Lead | Alternate | Locale |
|---|---|---|---|---|---|
| Hailey Armstrong | Melissa Gannon | Andréanne Janelle-Gravel | Pamela Nugent | Sarah Throop | Montreal, Quebec |
| Kira Brunton | Kendra Lilly | Jamie Smith | Lauren Rajala | | Sudbury, Ontario |
| Krysta Burns | Laura Forget | Sara Guy | Laura Masters | | Sudbury, Ontario |
| Grace Cave | Emily Deschenes | Madison Fisher | Melanie Ebach | | North Dundas, Ontario |
| Bella Croisier | Piper Croisier | Mya Smith | Valérie Ouimet | | Sudbury, Ontario |
| Amanda Gebhardt | Mackenzie Daley | Erin Cook | Allison Singh | | Guelph, Ontario |
| Jenna Godfrey | Rihanna Third | – (Note: Team Godfrey competed with three players.) | Brittany Martin | | North Bay, Ontario |
| Ha Seung-youn | Kim Hye-rin | Kim Cho-hi | Kim Seon-yeong | | Gangneung, South Korea |
| Carly Howard | Grace Holyoke | Emma Artichuk | Alice Holyoke | | Toronto, Ontario |
| Corrie Hürlimann | Marina Lörtscher | Celine Schwizgebel | Isabel Einspieler | | Zug, Switzerland |
| Brooklyn Ideson | Lauren Evason | Aila Thompson | Clara Dissanayake | | London, Ontario |
| Danielle Inglis | Jo-Ann Rizzo | Geri-Lynn Ramsay | Joanne Tarvit | | Whitby, Ontario |
| Kim Kyeong-ae (Note: Kim Kyeong-ae skipped Team Kang as Kang Bo-bae was training with the mixed doubles national team. Kim Min-seo moved from alternate to third.) | Kim Min-seo | Shim Yu-jeong | Kim Ji-soo | | Jeonbuk, South Korea |
| Katelin Langford | Madison Onischke | Valorie Martin | Madeleine Foley | | Uxbridge, Ontario |
| Kayla MacMillan | – (Note: Skip and third rock thrower Val Sweeting was away for the tournament, with Team MacMillan playing with three players and Kayla MacMillan skipping the team.) | Lindsay Dubue | Lauren Lenentine | | Victoria, British Columbia |
| Jenny Madden | Bridget Whynot | Emily Parkinson | Jessica Guilbault | | Ottawa, Ontario |
| Lauren Mann | Sadie Pinksen | Leigh Gustafson | Alison Taylor | | Iqaluit, Nunavut |
| Christine McMakin | Sara Olson | Tessa Thurlow | Abigail Lin | | (United States) Fargo, North Dakota |
| Sherry Middaugh | Kelly Middaugh | Emily Middaugh | Megan Smith | | Niagara Falls, Ontario |
| Selena Njegovan | Erin Pincott | Margot Flemming | Krysten Karwacki | | Winnipeg, Manitoba |
| Chelsea Principi | Lauren Peskett | Brenda Chapman | Keira McLaughlin | | Niagara Falls, Ontario |
| Breanna Rozon | Chrissy Cadorin | Celeste Gauthier | Jillian Page | | Brantford, Ontario |
| Miyu Ueno | Asuka Kanai | Yui Ozeki | Yui Ueno | | Karuizawa, Japan |
| Dominique Vivier | Ava Acres | Paige Bown | Sadie McCutcheon | | Navan, Ontario |
| Giulia Zardini Lacedelli | Elena Mathis | Marta Lo Deserto | Rachele Scalesse | | Cortina d'Ampezzo, Italy |

== Round robin standings ==
Final Round Robin Standings

Key
| Teams to Playoffs |

| Pool A | W | L |
|---|---|---|
| (South Korea) Team Kang | 4 | 0 |
| (Ontario) Amanda Gebhardt | 2 | 2 |
| (Ontario) Carly Howard | 2 | 2 |
| (Ontario) Sherry Middaugh | 1 | 3 |
| (Ontario) Dominique Vivier | 1 | 3 |

| Pool B | W | L |
|---|---|---|
| (Japan) Miyu Ueno | 3 | 1 |
| (Ontario) Kira Brunton | 3 | 1 |
| (Ontario) Danielle Inglis | 2 | 2 |
| (Ontario) Brooklyn Ideson | 2 | 2 |
| (Nunavut) Lauren Mann | 0 | 4 |

| Pool C | W | L |
|---|---|---|
| (Ontario) Chelsea Principi | 4 | 0 |
| (South Korea) Ha Seung-youn | 3 | 1 |
| (United States) Christine McMakin | 2 | 2 |
| (Ontario) Krysta Burns | 1 | 3 |
| (Ontario) Katelin Langford | 0 | 4 |

| Pool D | W | L |
|---|---|---|
| (Manitoba) Selena Njegovan | 3 | 1 |
| (Switzerland) Corrie Hürlimann | 3 | 1 |
| (Ontario) Grace Cave | 2 | 2 |
| (Ontario) Jenny Madden | 1 | 3 |
| (Ontario) Bella Croisier | 1 | 3 |

| Pool E | W | L |
|---|---|---|
| (British Columbia) Kayla MacMillan | 4 | 0 |
| (Italy) Giulia Zardini Lacedelli | 3 | 1 |
| (Ontario) Breanna Rozon | 2 | 2 |
| (Quebec) Hailey Armstrong | 1 | 3 |
| (Ontario) Jenna Godfrey | 0 | 4 |

== Round robin results ==
All draw times are listed in Eastern Time (UTC−04:00).

=== Draw 1 ===
Thursday, November 5, 12:00 pm

| Sheet A | 1 | 2 | 3 | 4 | 5 | 6 | 7 | 8 | Final |
| (South Korea) Team Kang 🔨 | 0 | 3 | 3 | 0 | 3 | X | X | X | 9 |
| (Ontario) Dominique Vivier | 1 | 0 | 0 | 1 | 0 | X | X | X | 2 |

| Sheet B | 1 | 2 | 3 | 4 | 5 | 6 | 7 | 8 | Final |
| (Ontario) Kira Brunton 🔨 | 1 | 0 | 0 | 3 | 4 | 0 | X | X | 8 |
| (Ontario) Brooklyn Ideson | 0 | 0 | 1 | 0 | 0 | 1 | X | X | 2 |

| Sheet C | 1 | 2 | 3 | 4 | 5 | 6 | 7 | 8 | Final |
| (Ontario) Krysta Burns 🔨 | 3 | 0 | 0 | 2 | 0 | 3 | 2 | X | 10 |
| (Ontario) Katelin Langford | 0 | 1 | 1 | 0 | 2 | 0 | 0 | X | 4 |

| Sheet D | 1 | 2 | 3 | 4 | 5 | 6 | 7 | 8 | 9 | Final |
| (Switzerland) Corrie Hürlimann | 0 | 0 | 1 | 0 | 0 | 3 | 0 | 0 | 1 | 5 |
| (Ontario) Bella Croisier 🔨 | 0 | 0 | 0 | 2 | 0 | 0 | 1 | 1 | 0 | 4 |

| Sheet E | 1 | 2 | 3 | 4 | 5 | 6 | 7 | 8 | Final |
| (Ontario) Breanna Rozon | 3 | 0 | 0 | 4 | 0 | 1 | X | X | 8 |
| (Ontario) Jenna Godfrey 🔨 | 0 | 1 | 0 | 0 | 1 | 0 | X | X | 2 |

=== Draw 2 ===
Thursday, November 5, 3:30 pm

| Sheet A | 1 | 2 | 3 | 4 | 5 | 6 | 7 | 8 | Final |
| (South Korea) Ha Seung-youn | 0 | 0 | 1 | 1 | 0 | 1 | 1 | 0 | 4 |
| (Ontario) Chelsea Principi 🔨 | 0 | 1 | 0 | 0 | 3 | 0 | 0 | 2 | 6 |

| Sheet B | 1 | 2 | 3 | 4 | 5 | 6 | 7 | 8 | Final |
| (Italy) Giulia Zardini Lacedelli | 0 | 0 | 1 | 0 | 1 | 0 | 2 | 0 | 4 |
| (British Columbia) Kayla MacMillan 🔨 | 0 | 0 | 0 | 2 | 0 | 2 | 0 | 1 | 5 |

| Sheet E | 1 | 2 | 3 | 4 | 5 | 6 | 7 | 8 | Final |
| (Japan) Miyu Ueno 🔨 | 0 | 0 | 0 | 0 | 0 | 2 | 0 | 2 | 4 |
| (Ontario) Danielle Inglis | 0 | 0 | 0 | 1 | 1 | 0 | 1 | 0 | 3 |

=== Draw 3 ===
Friday, November 6, 12:00 pm

| Sheet A | 1 | 2 | 3 | 4 | 5 | 6 | 7 | 8 | Final |
| (Ontario) Kira Brunton 🔨 | 0 | 0 | 0 | 1 | 0 | 0 | 1 | 0 | 2 |
| (Japan) Miyu Ueno | 0 | 1 | 1 | 0 | 2 | 0 | 0 | 2 | 6 |

| Sheet B | 1 | 2 | 3 | 4 | 5 | 6 | 7 | 8 | Final |
| (South Korea) Team Kang 🔨 | 2 | 0 | 1 | 0 | 1 | 2 | 2 | X | 8 |
| (Ontario) Carly Howard | 0 | 3 | 0 | 0 | 0 | 0 | 0 | X | 3 |

| Sheet C | 1 | 2 | 3 | 4 | 5 | 6 | 7 | 8 | Final |
| (Ontario) Sherry Middaugh 🔨 | 1 | 2 | 0 | 0 | 0 | 1 | 0 | 0 | 4 |
| (Ontario) Amanda Gebhardt | 0 | 0 | 1 | 1 | 2 | 0 | 0 | 3 | 7 |

| Sheet D | 1 | 2 | 3 | 4 | 5 | 6 | 7 | 8 | Final |
| (Quebec) Hailey Armstrong | 0 | 0 | 2 | 0 | 0 | 0 | 0 | X | 2 |
| (Ontario) Breanna Rozon 🔨 | 0 | 3 | 0 | 0 | 0 | 1 | 1 | X | 5 |

| Sheet E | 1 | 2 | 3 | 4 | 5 | 6 | 7 | 8 | Final |
| (South Korea) Ha Seung-youn 🔨 | 3 | 1 | 3 | 1 | 1 | X | X | X | 9 |
| (United States) Christine McMakin | 0 | 0 | 0 | 0 | 0 | X | X | X | 0 |

| Sheet F | 1 | 2 | 3 | 4 | 5 | 6 | 7 | 8 | 9 | Final |
| (Manitoba) Selena Njegovan | 0 | 0 | 1 | 2 | 0 | 3 | 1 | 0 | 1 | 8 |
| (Ontario) Jenny Madden 🔨 | 0 | 3 | 0 | 0 | 3 | 0 | 0 | 1 | 0 | 7 |

=== Draw 4 ===
Friday, November 6, 3:00 pm

| Sheet B | 1 | 2 | 3 | 4 | 5 | 6 | 7 | 8 | Final |
| (Ontario) Chelsea Principi 🔨 | 3 | 0 | 1 | 3 | 1 | 0 | X | X | 8 |
| (Ontario) Katelin Langford | 0 | 1 | 0 | 0 | 0 | 1 | X | X | 2 |

| Sheet C | 1 | 2 | 3 | 4 | 5 | 6 | 7 | 8 | Final |
| (Ontario) Danielle Inglis | 0 | 2 | 0 | 3 | 2 | 0 | X | X | 7 |
| (Nunavut) Lauren Mann 🔨 | 1 | 0 | 1 | 0 | 0 | 1 | X | X | 3 |

| Sheet D | 1 | 2 | 3 | 4 | 5 | 6 | 7 | 8 | Final |
| (Italy) Giulia Zardini Lacedelli 🔨 | 1 | 0 | 3 | 3 | 3 | X | X | X | 10 |
| (Ontario) Jenna Godfrey | 0 | 1 | 0 | 0 | 0 | X | X | X | 1 |

| Sheet E | 1 | 2 | 3 | 4 | 5 | 6 | 7 | 8 | Final |
| (Ontario) Grace Cave | 0 | 0 | 0 | 0 | X | X | X | X | 0 |
| (Switzerland) Corrie Hürlimann 🔨 | 0 | 3 | 5 | 1 | X | X | X | X | 9 |

=== Draw 5 ===
Friday, November 6, 6:30 pm

| Sheet A | 1 | 2 | 3 | 4 | 5 | 6 | 7 | 8 | 9 | Final |
| (Manitoba) Selena Njegovan | 0 | 1 | 0 | 1 | 2 | 0 | 0 | 2 | 0 | 6 |
| (Ontario) Bella Croisier 🔨 | 2 | 0 | 0 | 0 | 0 | 3 | 1 | 0 | 1 | 7 |

| Sheet B | 1 | 2 | 3 | 4 | 5 | 6 | 7 | 8 | Final |
| (South Korea) Ha Seung-youn | 0 | 1 | 1 | 0 | 1 | 0 | 0 | 4 | 7 |
| (Ontario) Krysta Burns 🔨 | 1 | 0 | 0 | 1 | 0 | 0 | 1 | 0 | 3 |

| Sheet C | 1 | 2 | 3 | 4 | 5 | 6 | 7 | 8 | 9 | Final |
| (Ontario) Grace Cave | 1 | 0 | 1 | 0 | 3 | 0 | 2 | 0 | 1 | 8 |
| (Ontario) Jenny Madden 🔨 | 0 | 1 | 0 | 1 | 0 | 2 | 0 | 3 | 0 | 7 |

| Sheet D | 1 | 2 | 3 | 4 | 5 | 6 | 7 | 8 | Final |
| (Ontario) Carly Howard | 0 | 2 | 0 | 0 | 0 | 1 | 0 | X | 3 |
| (Ontario) Amanda Gebhardt 🔨 | 1 | 0 | 1 | 1 | 1 | 0 | 1 | X | 5 |

| Sheet E | 1 | 2 | 3 | 4 | 5 | 6 | 7 | 8 | Final |
| (Ontario) Sherry Middaugh | 0 | 1 | 0 | 5 | 2 | 0 | 1 | X | 9 |
| (Ontario) Dominique Vivier 🔨 | 2 | 0 | 1 | 0 | 0 | 1 | 0 | X | 4 |

| Sheet F | 1 | 2 | 3 | 4 | 5 | 6 | 7 | 8 | Final |
| (Japan) Miyu Ueno 🔨 | 1 | 0 | 0 | 3 | 0 | 2 | 1 | X | 7 |
| (Nunavut) Lauren Mann | 0 | 1 | 1 | 0 | 0 | 0 | 0 | X | 2 |

=== Draw 6 ===
Friday, November 6, 9:30 pm

| Sheet A | 1 | 2 | 3 | 4 | 5 | 6 | 7 | 8 | Final |
| (Ontario) Danielle Inglis | 2 | 3 | 0 | 1 | 0 | 3 | X | X | 9 |
| (Ontario) Brooklyn Ideson 🔨 | 0 | 0 | 1 | 0 | 2 | 0 | X | X | 3 |

| Sheet C | 1 | 2 | 3 | 4 | 5 | 6 | 7 | 8 | 9 | Final |
| (Quebec) Hailey Armstrong | 0 | 2 | 0 | 3 | 0 | 1 | 0 | 1 | 0 | 7 |
| (Italy) Giulia Zardini Lacedelli 🔨 | 1 | 0 | 2 | 0 | 2 | 0 | 2 | 0 | 1 | 8 |

| Sheet D | 1 | 2 | 3 | 4 | 5 | 6 | 7 | 8 | Final |
| (Ontario) Chelsea Principi | 0 | 0 | 4 | 0 | 1 | 1 | 1 | X | 7 |
| (United States) Christine McMakin 🔨 | 0 | 1 | 0 | 1 | 0 | 0 | 0 | X | 2 |

| Sheet F | 1 | 2 | 3 | 4 | 5 | 6 | 7 | 8 | Final |
| (British Columbia) Kayla MacMillan | 2 | 0 | 3 | 2 | 0 | 1 | X | X | 8 |
| (Ontario) Jenna Godfrey 🔨 | 0 | 1 | 0 | 0 | 1 | 0 | X | X | 2 |

=== Draw 7 ===
Saturday, November 7, 8:00 am

| Sheet B | 1 | 2 | 3 | 4 | 5 | 6 | 7 | 8 | Final |
| (Ontario) Grace Cave 🔨 | 1 | 1 | 0 | 0 | 4 | 0 | 0 | 1 | 7 |
| (Ontario) Bella Croisier | 0 | 0 | 3 | 2 | 0 | 1 | 0 | 0 | 6 |

| Sheet C | 1 | 2 | 3 | 4 | 5 | 6 | 7 | 8 | Final |
| (Switzerland) Corrie Hürlimann | 0 | 1 | 0 | 1 | 2 | 0 | 0 | 0 | 4 |
| (Manitoba) Selena Njegovan 🔨 | 2 | 0 | 1 | 0 | 0 | 1 | 2 | 1 | 7 |

| Sheet D | 1 | 2 | 3 | 4 | 5 | 6 | 7 | 8 | Final |
| (South Korea) Ha Seung-youn 🔨 | 3 | 0 | 4 | 0 | 0 | X | X | X | 7 |
| (Ontario) Katelin Langford | 0 | 1 | 0 | 0 | 0 | X | X | X | 1 |

| Sheet E | 1 | 2 | 3 | 4 | 5 | 6 | 7 | 8 | Final |
| (Ontario) Kira Brunton | 0 | 3 | 2 | 0 | 0 | 3 | X | X | 8 |
| (Nunavut) Lauren Mann 🔨 | 1 | 0 | 0 | 1 | 1 | 0 | X | X | 3 |

| Sheet F | 1 | 2 | 3 | 4 | 5 | 6 | 7 | 8 | Final |
| (South Korea) Team Kang 🔨 | 3 | 2 | 0 | 0 | 2 | 4 | X | X | 11 |
| (Ontario) Amanda Gebhardt | 0 | 0 | 2 | 1 | 0 | 0 | X | X | 3 |

=== Draw 8 ===
Saturday, November 7, 11:00 am

| Sheet A | 1 | 2 | 3 | 4 | 5 | 6 | 7 | 8 | Final |
| (British Columbia) Kayla MacMillan | 0 | 0 | 1 | 0 | 2 | 1 | 0 | 3 | 7 |
| (Ontario) Breanna Rozon 🔨 | 1 | 1 | 0 | 1 | 0 | 0 | 1 | 0 | 4 |

| Sheet B | 1 | 2 | 3 | 4 | 5 | 6 | 7 | 8 | Final |
| (Quebec) Hailey Armstrong 🔨 | 5 | 0 | 2 | 0 | 2 | X | X | X | 9 |
| (Ontario) Jenna Godfrey | 0 | 2 | 0 | 1 | 0 | X | X | X | 3 |

| Sheet C | 1 | 2 | 3 | 4 | 5 | 6 | 7 | 8 | Final |
| (Ontario) Carly Howard | 2 | 1 | 0 | 0 | 1 | 1 | 0 | 1 | 6 |
| (Ontario) Dominique Vivier 🔨 | 0 | 0 | 3 | 1 | 0 | 0 | 0 | 0 | 4 |

| Sheet D | 1 | 2 | 3 | 4 | 5 | 6 | 7 | 8 | Final |
| (Japan) Miyu Ueno 🔨 | 3 | 1 | 0 | 1 | 0 | 0 | 0 | 1 | 6 |
| (Ontario) Brooklyn Ideson | 0 | 0 | 3 | 0 | 2 | 2 | 1 | 0 | 8 |

| Sheet E | 1 | 2 | 3 | 4 | 5 | 6 | 7 | 8 | Final |
| (United States) Christine McMakin 🔨 | 2 | 1 | 0 | 0 | 0 | 0 | 0 | 4 | 7 |
| (Ontario) Katelin Langford | 0 | 0 | 2 | 2 | 0 | 1 | 1 | 0 | 6 |

| Sheet F | 1 | 2 | 3 | 4 | 5 | 6 | 7 | 8 | Final |
| (Ontario) Krysta Burns | 0 | 1 | 0 | 0 | X | X | X | X | 1 |
| (Ontario) Chelsea Principi 🔨 | 4 | 0 | 1 | 3 | X | X | X | X | 8 |

=== Draw 9 ===
Saturday, November 7, 2:30 pm

| Sheet A | 1 | 2 | 3 | 4 | 5 | 6 | 7 | 8 | Final |
| (Ontario) Jenny Madden | 0 | 0 | 1 | 0 | 4 | 0 | 0 | 0 | 5 |
| (Switzerland) Corrie Hürlimann 🔨 | 2 | 0 | 0 | 2 | 0 | 1 | 2 | 1 | 8 |

| Sheet B | 1 | 2 | 3 | 4 | 5 | 6 | 7 | 8 | Final |
| (Ontario) Dominique Vivier 🔨 | 2 | 0 | 3 | 0 | 2 | 1 | X | X | 8 |
| (Ontario) Amanda Gebhardt | 0 | 1 | 0 | 2 | 0 | 0 | X | X | 3 |

| Sheet D | 1 | 2 | 3 | 4 | 5 | 6 | 7 | 8 | Final |
| (Ontario) Sherry Middaugh | 0 | 0 | 1 | 0 | 1 | 1 | 0 | X | 3 |
| (South Korea) Team Kang 🔨 | 0 | 4 | 0 | 1 | 0 | 0 | 4 | X | 9 |

| Sheet E | 1 | 2 | 3 | 4 | 5 | 6 | 7 | 8 | 9 | Final |
| (Manitoba) Selena Njegovan 🔨 | 0 | 0 | 0 | 0 | 5 | 0 | 1 | 0 | 3 | 9 |
| (Ontario) Grace Cave | 1 | 0 | 0 | 0 | 0 | 2 | 0 | 3 | 0 | 6 |

| Sheet F | 1 | 2 | 3 | 4 | 5 | 6 | 7 | 8 | Final |
| (Ontario) Kira Brunton | 0 | 1 | 2 | 1 | 0 | 2 | 3 | X | 9 |
| (Ontario) Danielle Inglis 🔨 | 0 | 0 | 0 | 0 | 1 | 0 | 0 | X | 1 |

=== Draw 10 ===
Saturday, November 7, 5:30 pm

| Sheet A | 1 | 2 | 3 | 4 | 5 | 6 | 7 | 8 | Final |
| (United States) Christine McMakin 🔨 | 0 | 3 | 0 | 0 | 0 | 2 | 0 | 1 | 6 |
| (Ontario) Krysta Burns | 1 | 0 | 1 | 1 | 1 | 0 | 1 | 0 | 5 |

| Sheet B | 1 | 2 | 3 | 4 | 5 | 6 | 7 | 8 | Final |
| (Ontario) Brooklyn Ideson 🔨 | 0 | 0 | 1 | 1 | 2 | 0 | 3 | X | 7 |
| (Nunavut) Lauren Mann | 0 | 1 | 0 | 0 | 0 | 1 | 0 | X | 2 |

| Sheet C | 1 | 2 | 3 | 4 | 5 | 6 | 7 | 8 | Final |
| (Ontario) Jenny Madden | 0 | 1 | 0 | 1 | 0 | 2 | 2 | 1 | 7 |
| (Ontario) Bella Croisier 🔨 | 1 | 0 | 2 | 0 | 1 | 0 | 0 | 0 | 4 |

| Sheet D | 1 | 2 | 3 | 4 | 5 | 6 | 7 | 8 | 9 | Final |
| (British Columbia) Kayla MacMillan | 1 | 2 | 0 | 1 | 0 | 2 | 0 | 0 | 1 | 7 |
| (Quebec) Hailey Armstrong 🔨 | 0 | 0 | 2 | 0 | 2 | 0 | 0 | 2 | 0 | 6 |

| Sheet E | 1 | 2 | 3 | 4 | 5 | 6 | 7 | 8 | Final |
| (Ontario) Sherry Middaugh 🔨 | 1 | 0 | 0 | 1 | 0 | 2 | 0 | 0 | 4 |
| (Ontario) Carly Howard | 0 | 2 | 2 | 0 | 1 | 0 | 1 | 3 | 9 |

| Sheet F | 1 | 2 | 3 | 4 | 5 | 6 | 7 | 8 | Final |
| (Italy) Giulia Zardini Lacedelli 🔨 | 1 | 0 | 2 | 0 | 2 | 2 | 0 | 1 | 8 |
| (Ontario) Breanna Rozon | 0 | 2 | 0 | 3 | 0 | 0 | 1 | 0 | 6 |

== Playoffs ==
Round of 10
8 | (Manitoba) Selena Njegovan | 7
9 | (Switzerland) Corrie Hürlimann | 6
7 | (South Korea) Ha Seung-youn | 7
10 | (Ontario) Breanna Rozon | 3

Quarterfinals
1 | (South Korea) Team Kang | 6
8 | (Manitoba) Selena Njegovan | 0
4 | (Japan) Miyu Ueno | 5
5 | (Ontario) Kira Brunton | 4
3 | (British Columbia) Kayla MacMillan | 5
6 | (Italy) Giulia Zardini Lacedelli | 4
2 | (Ontario) Chelsea Principi | 7
7 | (South Korea) Ha Seung-youn | 5

Semifinals
1 | (South Korea) Team Kang | 6
4 | (Japan) Miyu Ueno | 1
3 | (British Columbia) Kayla MacMillan | 8
2 | (Ontario) Chelsea Principi | 9

Final
1 | (South Korea) Team Kang | 3
2 | (Ontario) Chelsea Principi | 10

=== Round of 10 ===
Saturday, November 7, 9:00 pm

| Sheet B | 1 | 2 | 3 | 4 | 5 | 6 | 7 | 8 | Final |
| (Manitoba) Selena Njegovan 🔨 | 1 | 0 | 1 | 1 | 0 | 2 | 0 | 2 | 7 |
| (Switzerland) Corrie Hürlimann | 0 | 2 | 0 | 0 | 2 | 0 | 2 | 0 | 6 |

| Sheet D | 1 | 2 | 3 | 4 | 5 | 6 | 7 | 8 | Final |
| (South Korea) Ha Seung-youn 🔨 | 1 | 0 | 2 | 0 | 2 | 0 | 2 | X | 7 |
| (Ontario) Breanna Rozon | 0 | 1 | 0 | 1 | 0 | 1 | 0 | X | 3 |

=== Quarterfinals ===
Sunday, November 8, 9:00 am

| Sheet B | 1 | 2 | 3 | 4 | 5 | 6 | 7 | 8 | Final |
| (British Columbia) Kayla MacMillan 🔨 | 2 | 0 | 0 | 1 | 0 | 1 | 0 | 1 | 5 |
| (Italy) Giulia Zardini Lacedelli | 0 | 1 | 0 | 0 | 1 | 0 | 2 | 0 | 4 |

| Sheet C | 1 | 2 | 3 | 4 | 5 | 6 | 7 | 8 | Final |
| (Ontario) Chelsea Principi 🔨 | 0 | 1 | 0 | 2 | 2 | 0 | 0 | 2 | 7 |
| (South Korea) Ha Seung-youn | 1 | 0 | 2 | 0 | 0 | 1 | 1 | 0 | 5 |

| Sheet D | 1 | 2 | 3 | 4 | 5 | 6 | 7 | 8 | Final |
| (Japan) Miyu Ueno | 0 | 0 | 1 | 2 | 0 | 1 | 0 | 1 | 5 |
| (Ontario) Kira Brunton 🔨 | 0 | 1 | 0 | 0 | 2 | 0 | 1 | 0 | 4 |

| Sheet E | 1 | 2 | 3 | 4 | 5 | 6 | 7 | 8 | Final |
| (South Korea) Team Kang 🔨 | 1 | 0 | 0 | 0 | 0 | 3 | 2 | X | 6 |
| (Manitoba) Selena Njegovan | 0 | 0 | 0 | 0 | 0 | 0 | 0 | X | 0 |

=== Semifinals ===
Sunday, November 8, 12:00 pm

| Sheet C | 1 | 2 | 3 | 4 | 5 | 6 | 7 | 8 | Final |
| (South Korea) Team Kang 🔨 | 0 | 0 | 0 | 2 | 0 | 1 | 3 | X | 6 |
| (Japan) Miyu Ueno | 0 | 0 | 0 | 0 | 1 | 0 | 0 | X | 1 |

| Sheet E | 1 | 2 | 3 | 4 | 5 | 6 | 7 | 8 | Final |
| (British Columbia) Kayla MacMillan | 0 | 0 | 3 | 0 | 2 | 0 | 2 | 1 | 8 |
| (Ontario) Chelsea Principi 🔨 | 2 | 3 | 0 | 1 | 0 | 3 | 0 | 0 | 9 |

=== Final ===
Sunday, November 8, 3:00 pm

| Sheet D | 1 | 2 | 3 | 4 | 5 | 6 | 7 | 8 | Final |
| (South Korea) Team Kang | 0 | 1 | 0 | 2 | 0 | 0 | X | X | 3 |
| (Ontario) Chelsea Principi 🔨 | 3 | 0 | 1 | 0 | 3 | 3 | X | X | 10 |
