= 2026 GSOC Open =

Grand Slam of Curling event

- Host city: Thunder Bay, Ontario
- Arena: Fort William Gardens
- Dates: December 1–6

The 2026 GSOC Open will be held from December 1 to 6 at Fort William Gardens in Thunder Bay, Ontario. It will be the fourth Grand Slam event of the 2026–27 curling season.

== Qualification ==
The top 12 ranked men's and women's teams on the World Curling Federation's world team rankings as of November 10, 2026, qualified for the event. In the event that a team declines their invitation, the next-ranked team on the world team ranking is invited until the twelve spots have been filled. The next two spots were given out to two sponsor's exemptions, while the remaining two spots were given out to winners of two GSOC satellite events. In the event that the winning team was already qualified, the next highest finishing team at the event was invited until the spot was filled.

=== Men ===
Means of Qualification	Vacancies	Qualified
World Rankings	12	(Switzerland) Yannick Schwaller (Manitoba) Matt Dunstone (Scotland) Grant Hardie (Scotland) Bruce Mouat (Alberta) Brad Jacobs (United States) Daniel Casper (Sweden) Oskar Eriksson (Switzerland) Marco Hösli (Manitoba) John Epping (Alberta) Brendan Bottcher (Italy) Stefano Spiller (Italy) Joël Retornaz
Sponsor's Exemptions	2	(Germany) Benjamin Kapp (Saskatchewan) Tyler Tardi
Stu Sells Oakville Tankard	1	(Manitoba) Jordon McDonald
Henderson Metal Fall Classic	1	(Quebec) Félix Asselin
TOTAL	16	

=== Women ===
Means of Qualification	Vacancies	Qualified
World Rankings	12	(South Korea) Gim Eun-ji (Switzerland) Xenia Schwaller (Sweden) Isabella Wranå (Manitoba) Kerri Einarson (Switzerland) Alina Pätz (Ontario) Rachel Homan (Japan) Miku Nihira (Sweden) Anna Hasselborg (Japan) Miyu Ueno (South Korea) Kim Kyeong-ae (Alberta) Selena Sturmay (South Korea) Park You-been
Sponsor's Exemptions	2	(Alberta) Serena Gray-Withers (Japan) Ikue Kitazawa
Stu Sells Oakville Tankard	1	(Switzerland) Corrie Hürlimann
Swiss Chalet Women's Curling Stadium Spiel	1	(Ontario) Chelsea Principi
TOTAL	16	

== Men ==
=== Teams ===
The teams are listed as follows:

Skip	Third	Second	Lead	Locale
Félix Asselin	Julien Tremblay	Jesse Mullen	Jean-Michel Arsenault	Montreal, Quebec
Brendan Bottcher	Jake Horgan	Tanner Horgan	Geoff Walker	Edmonton, Alberta
Daniel Casper	Luc Violette	Ben Richardson	Aidan Oldenburg	(United States) Chaska, Minnesota
Matt Dunstone	Colton Lott	Mark Nichols	Ryan Harnden	Winnipeg, Manitoba
John Epping	B. J. Neufeld	Ryan Wiebe	Ian McMillan	Winnipeg, Manitoba
Oskar Eriksson	Rasmus Wranå	Simon Olofsson	Christoffer Sundgren	Karlstad, Sweden
Ross Whyte (Fourth)	Grant Hardie (Skip)	Craig Waddell	Euan Kyle	Stirling, Scotland
Philipp Hösli (Fourth)	Marco Hösli (Skip)	Simon Gloor	Justin Hausherr	Glarus, Switzerland
Brad Jacobs	Marc Kennedy	Brett Gallant	Ben Hebert	Calgary, Alberta
Benjamin Kapp	Felix Messenzehl	Johannes Scheuerl	Mario Trevisiol	Füssen, Germany
Jordon McDonald	Jacques Gauthier	Elias Huminicki	Cameron Olafson	Winnipeg, Manitoba
Bruce Mouat	Robin Brydone	Bobby Lammie	Hammy McMillan Jr.	Stirling, Scotland
Joël Retornaz	Stefano Gilli	Andrea Gilli	Alberto Pimpini	Brunico, Italy
Benoît Schwarz-van Berkel (Fourth)	Yannick Schwaller (Skip)	Sven Michel	Pablo Lachat-Couchepin	Geneva, Switzerland
Stefano Spiller	Amos Mosaner	Sebastiano Arman	Cesare Spiller	Trentino, Italy
Tyler Tardi	Colton Flasch	Kevin Marsh	Daniel Marsh	Saskatoon, Saskatchewan

=== Round robin standings ===
Key
Teams to Playoffs
Teams to Tiebreaker

Pool A	W	SOW	SOL	L	PF	PA	Pts	LSD
(Quebec) Félix Asselin	0	0	0	0	0	0	0	0.0
(Manitoba) John Epping	0	0	0	0	0	0	0	0.0
(Switzerland) Marco Hösli	0	0	0	0	0	0	0	0.0
(Switzerland) Yannick Schwaller	0	0	0	0	0	0	0	0.0

Pool B	W	SOW	SOL	L	PF	PA	Pts	LSD
(Alberta) Brendan Bottcher	0	0	0	0	0	0	0	0.0
(Manitoba) Matt Dunstone	0	0	0	0	0	0	0	0.0
(Sweden) Oskar Eriksson	0	0	0	0	0	0	0	0.0
(Germany) Benjamin Kapp	0	0	0	0	0	0	0	0.0

Pool C	W	SOW	SOL	L	PF	PA	Pts	LSD
(United States) Daniel Casper	0	0	0	0	0	0	0	0.0
(Scotland) Grant Hardie	0	0	0	0	0	0	0	0.0
(Italy) Stefano Spiller	0	0	0	0	0	0	0	0.0
(Saskatchewan) Tyler Tardi	0	0	0	0	0	0	0	0.0

Pool D	W	SOW	SOL	L	PF	PA	Pts	LSD
(Alberta) Brad Jacobs	0	0	0	0	0	0	0	0.0
(Manitoba) Jordon McDonald	0	0	0	0	0	0	0	0.0
(Scotland) Bruce Mouat	0	0	0	0	0	0	0	0.0
(Italy) Joël Retornaz	0	0	0	0	0	0	0	0.0

=== Round robin results ===
All draw times are listed in Eastern Time (UTC−05:00).

==== Draw 1 ====
Tuesday, December 1, 8:00 am

Sheet C	1	2	3	4	5	6	7	8	Final
(Alberta) Brendan Bottcher									0
(Germany) Benjamin Kapp									0

Sheet D	1	2	3	4	5	6	7	8	Final
(Scotland) Grant Hardie									0
(Saskatchewan) Tyler Tardi									0

==== Draw 2 ====
Tuesday, December 1, 11:30 am

Sheet C	1	2	3	4	5	6	7	8	Final
(Manitoba) John Epping									0
(Quebec) Félix Asselin									0

Sheet D	1	2	3	4	5	6	7	8	Final
(United States) Daniel Casper									0
(Italy) Stefano Spiller									0

==== Draw 3 ====
Tuesday, December 1, 3:30 pm

Sheet C	1	2	3	4	5	6	7	8	Final
(Switzerland) Yannick Schwaller									0
(Switzerland) Marco Hösli									0

Sheet D	1	2	3	4	5	6	7	8	Final
(Alberta) Brad Jacobs									0
(Manitoba) Jordon McDonald									0

==== Draw 4 ====
Tuesday, December 1, 7:30 pm

Sheet B	1	2	3	4	5	6	7	8	Final
(Manitoba) Matt Dunstone									0
(Sweden) Oskar Eriksson									0

Sheet D	1	2	3	4	5	6	7	8	Final
(Scotland) Bruce Mouat									0
(Italy) Joël Retornaz									0

==== Draw 5 ====
Wednesday, December 2, 8:00 am

Sheet A	1	2	3	4	5	6	7	8	Final
(Italy) Stefano Spiller									0
(Saskatchewan) Tyler Tardi									0

Sheet B	1	2	3	4	5	6	7	8	Final
(Switzerland) Yannick Schwaller									0
(Quebec) Félix Asselin									0

==== Draw 6 ====
Wednesday, December 2, 11:30 am

Sheet A	1	2	3	4	5	6	7	8	Final
(Scotland) Bruce Mouat									0
(Germany) Benjamin Kapp									0

Sheet B	1	2	3	4	5	6	7	8	Final
(Alberta) Brad Jacobs									0
(Alberta) Brendan Bottcher									0

==== Draw 7 ====
Wednesday, December 2, 3:30 pm

Sheet A	1	2	3	4	5	6	7	8	Final
(Switzerland) Marco Hösli									0
(Manitoba) John Epping									0

==== Draw 8 ====
Wednesday, December 2, 7:30 pm

Sheet A	1	2	3	4	5	6	7	8	Final
(Sweden) Oskar Eriksson									0
(Italy) Joël Retornaz									0

Sheet B	1	2	3	4	5	6	7	8	Final
(Scotland) Grant Hardie									0
(United States) Daniel Casper									0

Sheet C	1	2	3	4	5	6	7	8	Final
(Manitoba) Matt Dunstone									0
(Manitoba) Jordon McDonald									0

==== Draw 9 ====
Thursday, December 3, 8:00 am

Sheet D	1	2	3	4	5	6	7	8	Final
(Switzerland) Marco Hösli									0
(Quebec) Félix Asselin									0

==== Draw 10 ====
Thursday, December 3, 11:30 am

Sheet C	1	2	3	4	5	6	7	8	Final
(Scotland) Grant Hardie									0
(Italy) Stefano Spiller									0

Sheet D	1	2	3	4	5	6	7	8	Final
(Manitoba) Matt Dunstone									0
(Germany) Benjamin Kapp									0

==== Draw 11 ====
Thursday, December 3, 3:30 pm

Sheet C	1	2	3	4	5	6	7	8	Final
(Alberta) Brad Jacobs									0
(Italy) Joël Retornaz									0

Sheet D	1	2	3	4	5	6	7	8	Final
(Sweden) Oskar Eriksson									0
(Alberta) Brendan Bottcher									0

==== Draw 12 ====
Thursday, December 3, 7:30 pm

Sheet A	1	2	3	4	5	6	7	8	Final
(United States) Daniel Casper									0
(Saskatchewan) Tyler Tardi									0

Sheet C	1	2	3	4	5	6	7	8	Final
(Scotland) Bruce Mouat									0
(Manitoba) Jordon McDonald									0

Sheet D	1	2	3	4	5	6	7	8	Final
(Switzerland) Yannick Schwaller									0
(Manitoba) John Epping									0

==== Draw 13 ====
Friday, December 4, 8:00 am

Sheet C	1	2	3	4	5	6	7	8	Final
(Sweden) Oskar Eriksson									0
(Germany) Benjamin Kapp									0

==== Draw 14 ====
Friday, December 4, 11:30 am

Sheet A	1	2	3	4	5	6	7	8	Final
(Italy) Joël Retornaz									0
(Manitoba) Jordon McDonald									0

Sheet B	1	2	3	4	5	6	7	8	Final
(Switzerland) Marco Hösli									0
(Italy) Stefano Spiller									0

Sheet C	1	2	3	4	5	6	7	8	Final
(Switzerland) Yannick Schwaller									0
(Saskatchewan) Tyler Tardi									0

==== Draw 15 ====
Friday, December 4, 3:30 pm

Sheet C	1	2	3	4	5	6	7	8	Final
(United States) Daniel Casper									0
(Manitoba) John Epping									0

Sheet D	1	2	3	4	5	6	7	8	Final
(Scotland) Grant Hardie									0
(Quebec) Félix Asselin									0

==== Draw 16 ====
Friday, December 4, 7:30 pm

Sheet A	1	2	3	4	5	6	7	8	Final
(Manitoba) Matt Dunstone									0
(Alberta) Brendan Bottcher									0

Sheet B	1	2	3	4	5	6	7	8	Final
(Scotland) Bruce Mouat									0
(Alberta) Brad Jacobs									0

=== Playoffs ===
Quarterfinals
1
8
4
5
2
7
3
6

Semifinals

Final

==== Quarterfinals ====
Saturday, December 5, 12:00 pm

Team	1	2	3	4	5	6	7	8	Final
									0
									0

Team	1	2	3	4	5	6	7	8	Final
									0
									0

Team	1	2	3	4	5	6	7	8	Final
									0
									0

Team	1	2	3	4	5	6	7	8	Final
									0
									0

==== Semifinals ====
Saturday, December 5, 8:00 pm

Team	1	2	3	4	5	6	7	8	Final
									0
									0

Team	1	2	3	4	5	6	7	8	Final
									0
									0

==== Final ====
Sunday, December 6, 12:00 pm

Team	1	2	3	4	5	6	7	8	Final
									0
									0

== Women ==
=== Teams ===
The teams are listed as follows:

Skip	Third	Second	Lead	Alternate	Locale
Kerri Einarson	Shannon Birchard	Karlee Burgess	Jocelyn Peterman		Gimli, Manitoba
Kim Min-ji (Fourth)	Gim Eun-ji (Skip)	Kim Su-ji	Seol Ye-eun	Seol Ye-ji	Uijeongbu, South Korea
Serena Gray-Withers	Catherine Clifford	Laura Walker	Zoe Cinnamon		Edmonton, Alberta
Anna Hasselborg	Sara McManus	Agnes Knochenhauer	Sofia Scharback		Sundbyberg, Sweden
Rachel Homan	Tracy Fleury	Emma Miskew	Sarah Wilkes		Ottawa, Ontario
Corrie Hürlimann	Marina Lörtscher	Celine Schwizgebel	Isabel Einspieler		Zug, Switzerland
Kim Kyeong-ae (Note: Kim Kyeong-ae skipped Team Kang as Kang Bo-bae was training with the mixed doubles national team. Kim Min-seo moved from alternate to third.)	Kim Min-seo	Shim Yu-jeong	Kim Ji-soo		Jeonbuk, South Korea
Ikue Kitazawa	Seina Nakajima	Minori Suzuki	Hasumi Ishigooka		Nagano, Japan
Miku Nihira	Momoha Tabata	Sae Yamamoto	Mikoto Nakajima		Sapporo, Japan
Park Seo-jin (Fourth)	Park You-been (Skip)	Yang Tae-i	Kim Su-jin		Chuncheon, South Korea
Alina Pätz	Selina Witschonke	Stefanie Berset	Renée Frigo		Geneva, Switzerland
Chelsea Principi	Lauren Peskett	Brenda Chapman	Keira McLaughlin		Niagara Falls, Ontario
Xenia Schwaller	Selina Gafner	Fabienne Rieder	Selina Rychiger		Zurich, Switzerland
Selena Sturmay	Danielle Schmiemann	Dezaray Hawes	Paige Papley		Edmonton, Alberta
Miyu Ueno	Asuka Kanai	Yui Ozeki	Yui Ueno		Karuizawa, Japan
Isabella Wranå	Almida de Val	Moa Dryburgh	Maria Larsson		Sundbyberg, Sweden

=== Round robin standings ===
Key
Teams to Playoffs
Teams to Tiebreaker

Pool A	W	SOW	SOL	L	PF	PA	Pts	LSD
(South Korea) Gim Eun-ji	0	0	0	0	0	0	0	0.0
(Sweden) Anna Hasselborg	0	0	0	0	0	0	0	0.0
(Ontario) Chelsea Principi	0	0	0	0	0	0	0	0.0
(Japan) Miyu Ueno	0	0	0	0	0	0	0	0.0

Pool B	W	SOW	SOL	L	PF	PA	Pts	LSD
(Switzerland) Corrie Hürlimann	0	0	0	0	0	0	0	0.0
(South Korea) Kim Kyeong-ae	0	0	0	0	0	0	0	0.0
(Japan) Miku Nihira	0	0	0	0	0	0	0	0.0
(Switzerland) Xenia Schwaller	0	0	0	0	0	0	0	0.0

Pool C	W	SOW	SOL	L	PF	PA	Pts	LSD
(Alberta) Serena Gray-Withers	0	0	0	0	0	0	0	0.0
(Ontario) Rachel Homan	0	0	0	0	0	0	0	0.0
(Alberta) Selena Sturmay	0	0	0	0	0	0	0	0.0
(Sweden) Isabella Wranå	0	0	0	0	0	0	0	0.0

Pool D	W	SOW	SOL	L	PF	PA	Pts	LSD
(Manitoba) Kerri Einarson	0	0	0	0	0	0	0	0.0
(Japan) Ikue Kitazawa	0	0	0	0	0	0	0	0.0
(South Korea) Park You-been	0	0	0	0	0	0	0	0.0
(Switzerland) Alina Pätz	0	0	0	0	0	0	0	0.0

=== Round robin results ===
All draw times are listed in Eastern Time (UTC−05:00).

==== Draw 1 ====
Tuesday, December 1, 8:00 am

Sheet A	1	2	3	4	5	6	7	8	Final
(South Korea) Gim Eun-ji									0
(Ontario) Chelsea Principi									0

Sheet B	1	2	3	4	5	6	7	8	Final
(Sweden) Isabella Wranå									0
(Alberta) Serena Gray-Withers									0

==== Draw 2 ====
Tuesday, December 1, 11:30 am

Sheet A	1	2	3	4	5	6	7	8	Final
(Switzerland) Alina Pätz									0
(South Korea) Kim Kyeong-ae									0

Sheet B	1	2	3	4	5	6	7	8	Final
(Manitoba) Kerri Einarson									0
(Switzerland) Corrie Hürlimann									0

==== Draw 3 ====
Tuesday, December 1, 3:30 pm

Sheet A	1	2	3	4	5	6	7	8	Final
(Sweden) Anna Hasselborg									0
(Japan) Miyu Ueno									0

Sheet B	1	2	3	4	5	6	7	8	Final
(Ontario) Rachel Homan									0
(Alberta) Selena Sturmay									0

==== Draw 4 ====
Tuesday, December 1, 7:30 pm

Sheet A	1	2	3	4	5	6	7	8	Final
(Japan) Miku Nihira									0
(South Korea) Park You-been									0

Sheet C	1	2	3	4	5	6	7	8	Final
(Switzerland) Xenia Schwaller									0
(Japan) Ikue Kitazawa									0

==== Draw 5 ====
Wednesday, December 2, 8:00 am

Sheet C	1	2	3	4	5	6	7	8	Final
(South Korea) Kim Kyeong-ae									0
(Switzerland) Corrie Hürlimann									0

Sheet D	1	2	3	4	5	6	7	8	Final
(Sweden) Anna Hasselborg									0
(Ontario) Chelsea Principi									0

==== Draw 6 ====
Wednesday, December 2, 11:30 am

Sheet C	1	2	3	4	5	6	7	8	Final
(Sweden) Isabella Wranå									0
(Alberta) Selena Sturmay									0

Sheet D	1	2	3	4	5	6	7	8	Final
(Manitoba) Kerri Einarson									0
(Japan) Ikue Kitazawa									0

==== Draw 7 ====
Wednesday, December 2, 3:30 pm

Sheet B	1	2	3	4	5	6	7	8	Final
(Switzerland) Alina Pätz									0
(South Korea) Park You-been									0

Sheet C	1	2	3	4	5	6	7	8	Final
(Ontario) Rachel Homan									0
(Alberta) Serena Gray-Withers									0

Sheet D	1	2	3	4	5	6	7	8	Final
(South Korea) Gim Eun-ji									0
(Japan) Miyu Ueno									0

==== Draw 8 ====
Wednesday, December 2, 7:30 pm

Sheet D	1	2	3	4	5	6	7	8	Final
(Switzerland) Xenia Schwaller									0
(Japan) Miku Nihira									0

==== Draw 9 ====
Thursday, December 3, 8:00 am

Sheet A	1	2	3	4	5	6	7	8	Final
(Manitoba) Kerri Einarson									0
(South Korea) Park You-been									0

Sheet B	1	2	3	4	5	6	7	8	Final
(Japan) Miyu Ueno									0
(Ontario) Chelsea Principi									0

Sheet C	1	2	3	4	5	6	7	8	Final
(Switzerland) Alina Pätz									0
(Japan) Ikue Kitazawa									0

==== Draw 10 ====
Thursday, December 3, 11:30 am

Sheet A	1	2	3	4	5	6	7	8	Final
(Switzerland) Xenia Schwaller									0
(Switzerland) Corrie Hürlimann									0

Sheet B	1	2	3	4	5	6	7	8	Final
(South Korea) Gim Eun-ji									0
(Sweden) Anna Hasselborg									0

==== Draw 11 ====
Thursday, December 3, 3:30 pm

Sheet A	1	2	3	4	5	6	7	8	Final
(Japan) Miku Nihira									0
(South Korea) Kim Kyeong-ae									0

Sheet B	1	2	3	4	5	6	7	8	Final
(Alberta) Selena Sturmay									0
(Alberta) Serena Gray-Withers									0

==== Draw 12 ====
Thursday, December 3, 7:30 pm

Sheet B	1	2	3	4	5	6	7	8	Final
(Sweden) Isabella Wranå									0
(Ontario) Rachel Homan									0

==== Draw 13 ====
Friday, December 4, 8:00 am

Sheet A	1	2	3	4	5	6	7	8	Final
(Sweden) Anna Hasselborg									0
(Alberta) Selena Sturmay									0

Sheet B	1	2	3	4	5	6	7	8	Final
(South Korea) Park You-been									0
(Japan) Ikue Kitazawa									0

Sheet D	1	2	3	4	5	6	7	8	Final
(Japan) Miku Nihira									0
(Switzerland) Corrie Hürlimann									0

==== Draw 14 ====
Friday, December 4, 11:30 am

Sheet D	1	2	3	4	5	6	7	8	Final
(Sweden) Isabella Wranå									0
(Ontario) Chelsea Principi									0

==== Draw 15 ====
Friday, December 4, 3:30 pm

Sheet A	1	2	3	4	5	6	7	8	Final
(Ontario) Rachel Homan									0
(Japan) Miyu Ueno									0

Sheet B	1	2	3	4	5	6	7	8	Final
(Manitoba) Kerri Einarson									0
(Switzerland) Alina Pätz									0

==== Draw 16 ====
Friday, December 4, 7:30 pm

Sheet C	1	2	3	4	5	6	7	8	Final
(Switzerland) Xenia Schwaller									0
(South Korea) Kim Kyeong-ae									0

Sheet D	1	2	3	4	5	6	7	8	Final
(South Korea) Gim Eun-ji									0
(Alberta) Serena Gray-Withers									0

=== Playoffs ===
Quarterfinals
1
8
4
5
2
7
3
6

Semifinals

Final

==== Quarterfinals ====
Saturday, December 5, 4:00 pm

Team	1	2	3	4	5	6	7	8	Final
									0
									0

Team	1	2	3	4	5	6	7	8	Final
									0
									0

Team	1	2	3	4	5	6	7	8	Final
									0
									0

Team	1	2	3	4	5	6	7	8	Final
									0
									0

==== Semifinals ====
Saturday, December 5, 8:00 pm

Team	1	2	3	4	5	6	7	8	Final
									0
									0

Team	1	2	3	4	5	6	7	8	Final
									0
									0

==== Final ====
Sunday, December 6, 4:00 pm

Team	1	2	3	4	5	6	7	8	Final
									0
									0
