= 2026 Henderson Metal Fall Classic =

- Host city: Sault Ste. Marie, Ontario
- Arena: YNCU Curling Centre
- Dates: October 21–24
- Winner: (Manitoba) Team Epping
- Curling club: Fort Rouge CC, Winnipeg
- Skip: John Epping
- Third: B. J. Neufeld
- Second: Ryan Wiebe
- Lead: Ian McMillan
- Finalist: (Italy) Joël Retornaz

The 2026 Henderson Metal Fall Classic presented by Kioti Tractors of Ontario was held from October 21 to 24 at the YNCU Curling Centre in Sault Ste. Marie, Ontario. The event was held in a triple-knockout format with a purse of $100,000.

In the final, John Epping and his new Manitoba rink of B. J. Neufeld, Ryan Wiebe and Ian McMillan continued their momentum from reaching the 2026 GSOC Invitational playoffs the weekend before, defeating Italy's Joël Retornaz 5–4. Both rinks qualified undefeated through the A side before winning their quarterfinal and semifinal matches to reach the final. Team Epping eliminated Ontario's Jayden King and Quebec's Félix Asselin while Team Retornaz earned victories over Japan's Tsuyoshi Yamaguchi and Alberta's Brad Jacobs. Manitoba's Matt Dunstone and the United States' John Shuster rounded out the playoff field. Of note, E. J. Harnden spared at lead for Team Jacobs in place of Ben Hebert.

For the 2026–27 season, the event was a satellite Grand Slam of Curling event. The highest ranking non-qualified team earned a spot at the 2026 GSOC Open, the fourth Grand Slam of the season.

== Teams ==
The teams are listed as follows:

Skip	Third	Second	Lead	Alternate	Locale
Shinya Abe	Tetsuro Shimizu	Asei Nakahara	Haruto Ouchi	Hayato Sato	Sapporo, Japan
Brian Adams Jr.	Colin Koivula	Jordan Potter	Mark Koivula		Thunder Bay, Ontario
Félix Asselin	Julien Tremblay	Jesse Mullen	Jean-Michel Arsenault		Montreal, Quebec
Kyle Sherlock (Fourth)	Matt Mann	Jake Glibota	J.C. Beecroft (Skip)	Rob Clayton	Sault Ste. Marie, Ontario
Alex Champ	Ben Bevan	Stuart Leslie	Travis Ackroyd		Toronto, Ontario
Jordan Chandler	Landan Rooney	Connor Lawes	Nathan Kim		Little Current, Ontario
Matt Dunstone	Colton Lott	Mark Nichols	Ryan Harnden		Winnipeg, Manitoba
John Epping	B. J. Neufeld	Ryan Wiebe	Ian McMillan		Winnipeg, Manitoba
Mike Fournier	Charlie Richard	Punit Sthankiya	Graeme Robson		Toronto, Ontario
Scott Howard	David Mathers	Pat Janssen	Scott Chadwick		Midland, Ontario
Matthew Hunt (Fourth)	Jake Reid	Ben Appleton	Connor Simms (Skip) (Note: Connor Simms skipped Team Hunt.)		Sault Ste. Marie, Ontario
Brad Jacobs	Marc Kennedy	Brett Gallant	E. J. Harnden (Note: E. J. Harnden spared for Ben Hebert.)		Calgary, Alberta
Jeong Byeong-jin	Kim Hyo-jun	Pyo Jeong-min	Kim Jin-hun	Kim Dae-hyun	Uiseong, South Korea
Jayden King	Dylan Niepage	Owen Henry	Victor Pietrangelo		Tillsonburg, Ontario
Sandy MacEwan (Fourth)	Dustin Montpellier (Skip) (Note: Dustin Montpellier skipped Team MacEwan.)	Olivier Bonin-Ducharme	Luc Ouimet		Sudbury, Ontario
Evan Robert (Fourth)	Justin MacKay (Skip)	Carter McClelland	Jake Clouthier		Sault Ste. Marie, Ontario
Jordon McDonald	Jacques Gauthier	Elias Huminicki	Cameron Olafson		Winnipeg, Manitoba
Sam Mooibroek	Owen Purcell	Scott Mitchell	Gavin Lydiate		Whitby, Ontario
Joël Retornaz	Stefano Gilli	Andrea Gilli	Alberto Pimpini		Brunico, Italy
Charlie Robert	Luc Ouimet	Jerome Landry	Dan Lemieux		Sault Ste. Marie, Ontario
John Shuster	Andrew Stopera	Mark Fenner	Lance Wheeler		(United States) Duluth, Minnesota
Tyler Tardi	Colton Flasch	Kevin Marsh	Daniel Marsh		Saskatoon, Saskatchewan
Riku Yanagisawa (Fourth)	Tsuyoshi Yamaguchi (Skip)	Takeru Yamamoto	Satoshi Koizumi		Karuizawa, Japan
Nathan Young	Brady Lumley	Matthew Garner	Spencer Dunlop		Oakville, Ontario

== Knockout Brackets ==
=== A Event ===
First Knockout	Qualifier 1
(Manitoba) Matt Dunstone	4
(Ontario) Mike Fournier	6	(South Korea) Jeong Byeong-jin	5
(South Korea) Jeong Byeong-jin	9	(South Korea) Jeong Byeong-jin	7
(United States) John Shuster	5
(Ontario) Jayden King	3
(United States) John Shuster	9	(United States) John Shuster	7
(Ontario) J.C. Beecroft	0	(South Korea) Jeong Byeong-jin	3
(Manitoba) John Epping	6
(Manitoba) John Epping	10
(Quebec) Félix Asselin	1	(Ontario) Brian Adams Jr.	1
(Ontario) Brian Adams Jr.	7	(Manitoba) John Epping	10
(Manitoba) Jordon McDonald	3
(Manitoba) Jordon McDonald	8
(Japan) Shinya Abe	6	(Japan) Shinya Abe	1
(Ontario) Team Hunt	3

First Knockout	Qualifier 2
(Saskatchewan) Tyler Tardi	7
(Ontario) Nathan Young	7	(Ontario) Nathan Young	6
(Ontario) Charlie Robert	2	(Saskatchewan) Tyler Tardi	9
(Japan) Tsuyoshi Yamaguchi	4
(Japan) Tsuyoshi Yamaguchi	8
(Ontario) Team MacEwan	3	(Ontario) Jordan Chandler	6
(Ontario) Jordan Chandler	6	(Saskatchewan) Tyler Tardi	3
(Italy) Joël Retornaz	6
(Italy) Joël Retornaz	7
(Ontario) Sam Mooibroek	9	(Ontario) Sam Mooibroek	2
(Ontario) Justin MacKay	3	(Italy) Joël Retornaz	8
(Alberta) Brad Jacobs	6
(Alberta) Brad Jacobs	5
(Ontario) Scott Howard	6	(Ontario) Alex Champ	3
(Ontario) Alex Champ	7

=== B Event ===
Second Knockout	Qualifier 3
(Manitoba) Matt Dunstone	9
(Ontario) Jayden King	5	(Manitoba) Matt Dunstone	4
(Japan) Tsuyoshi Yamaguchi	6
(Japan) Tsuyoshi Yamaguchi	4
(Ontario) Brian Adams Jr.	4	(Alberta) Brad Jacobs	3
(Japan) Shinya Abe	7	(Japan) Shinya Abe	5
(Alberta) Brad Jacobs	6
(Japan) Tsuyoshi Yamaguchi	2
(Ontario) Mike Fournier	6	(Quebec) Félix Asselin	6
(Ontario) J.C. Beecroft	2	(Ontario) Mike Fournier	3
(Quebec) Félix Asselin	6	(Quebec) Félix Asselin	4
(Ontario) Team Hunt	5	(Quebec) Félix Asselin	7
(South Korea) Jeong Byeong-jin	6

Second Knockout	Qualifier 4
(Ontario) Nathan Young	7
(Ontario) Jordan Chandler	2	(Ontario) Nathan Young	4
(United States) John Shuster	7
(United States) John Shuster	9
(Ontario) Sam Mooibroek	5	(Ontario) Sam Mooibroek	4
(Ontario) Alex Champ	4	(Ontario) Sam Mooibroek	10
(Manitoba) Jordon McDonald	4
(United States) John Shuster	6
(Ontario) Charlie Robert	7	(Ontario) Scott Howard	5
(Ontario) Team MacEwan	2	(Ontario) Charlie Robert	0
(Ontario) Justin MacKay	1	(Ontario) Scott Howard	9
(Ontario) Scott Howard	8	(Ontario) Scott Howard	6
(Saskatchewan) Tyler Tardi	1

=== C Event ===
Third Knockout						Qualifier 5
				(Ontario) Nathan Young	12
				(Ontario) Team Hunt	6
		(Ontario) Charlie Robert	4
(Ontario) J.C. Beecroft	3	(Ontario) Team Hunt	8
(Ontario) Team Hunt	5					(Ontario) Nathan Young	1
						(Japan) Tsuyoshi Yamaguchi	8

Third Knockout	Qualifier 6
(Ontario) Jordan Chandler	6
(Ontario) Alex Champ	7	(Ontario) Alex Champ	4
(South Korea) Jeong Byeong-jin	6
(South Korea) Jeong Byeong-jin	6
(Alberta) Brad Jacobs	7
(Manitoba) Jordon McDonald	3
(Alberta) Brad Jacobs	6

Third Knockout				Qualifier 7
		(Japan) Shinya Abe	4
		(Ontario) Sam Mooibroek	9
				(Ontario) Sam Mooibroek	3
(Ontario) Jayden King	8			(Ontario) Jayden King	6
(Ontario) Brian Adams Jr.	1	(Ontario) Jayden King	7
		(Saskatchewan) Tyler Tardi	5

Third Knockout	Qualifier 8
(Ontario) Mike Fournier	8
(Ontario) Team MacEwan	8	(Ontario) Team MacEwan	5
(Ontario) Justin MacKay	2	(Ontario) Mike Fournier	3
(Manitoba) Matt Dunstone	7
(Manitoba) Matt Dunstone	6
(Ontario) Scott Howard	1

== Knockout Results ==
All draw times are listed in Eastern Time (UTC−04:00).

=== Draw 1 ===
Wednesday, October 21, 9:00 am

Sheet A	1	2	3	4	5	6	7	8	Final
(Japan) Shinya Abe	0	0	0	3	0	0	3	X	6
(Ontario) Team Hunt 🔨	0	2	1	0	0	0	0	X	3

Sheet B	1	2	3	4	5	6	7	8	Final
(United States) John Shuster 🔨	3	2	0	2	2	X	X	X	9
(Ontario) J.C. Beecroft	0	0	0	0	0	X	X	X	0

Sheet C	1	2	3	4	5	6	7	8	Final
(Quebec) Félix Asselin 🔨	0	0	1	0	0	0	X	X	1
(Ontario) Brian Adams Jr.	1	0	0	4	1	1	X	X	7

Sheet D	1	2	3	4	5	6	7	8	9	Final
(Ontario) Mike Fournier 🔨	1	0	0	2	2	0	0	1	0	6
(South Korea) Jeong Byeong-jin	0	2	1	0	0	0	3	0	3	9

=== Draw 2 ===
Wednesday, October 21, 12:30 pm

Sheet A	1	2	3	4	5	6	7	8	9	Final
(Ontario) Scott Howard 🔨	0	2	0	1	0	1	1	1	0	6
(Ontario) Alex Champ	0	0	3	0	3	0	0	0	1	7

Sheet B	1	2	3	4	5	6	7	8	Final
(Ontario) Team MacEwan	1	0	1	0	1	0	0	X	3
(Ontario) Jordan Chandler 🔨	0	2	0	2	0	0	2	X	6

Sheet E	1	2	3	4	5	6	7	8	Final
(Ontario) Sam Mooibroek 🔨	2	0	0	0	1	0	6	X	9
(Ontario) Justin MacKay	0	0	1	1	0	1	0	X	3

Sheet F	1	2	3	4	5	6	7	8	Final
(Ontario) Nathan Young 🔨	2	0	4	0	0	1	X	X	7
(Ontario) Charlie Robert	0	1	0	1	0	0	X	X	2

=== Draw 3 ===
Wednesday, October 21, 4:00 pm

Sheet A	1	2	3	4	5	6	7	8	Final
(Ontario) Jayden King	0	1	1	0	1	0	0	X	3
(United States) John Shuster 🔨	0	0	0	2	0	4	1	X	7

Sheet B	1	2	3	4	5	6	7	8	Final
(Manitoba) Matt Dunstone	0	1	0	1	0	1	0	1	4
(South Korea) Jeong Byeong-jin 🔨	2	0	1	0	2	0	0	0	5

Sheet C	1	2	3	4	5	6	7	8	Final
(Ontario) Mike Fournier	0	0	0	3	0	1	0	2	6
(Ontario) J.C. Beecroft 🔨	1	0	0	0	0	0	1	0	2

Sheet D	1	2	3	4	5	6	7	8	Final
(Quebec) Félix Asselin	0	1	0	1	0	3	1	0	6
(Ontario) Team Hunt 🔨	1	0	1	0	1	0	0	2	5

Sheet E	1	2	3	4	5	6	7	8	Final
(Manitoba) John Epping 🔨	3	0	2	2	3	X	X	X	10
(Ontario) Brian Adams Jr.	0	1	0	0	0	X	X	X	1

Sheet F	1	2	3	4	5	6	7	8	Final
(Manitoba) Jordon McDonald 🔨	3	2	0	3	X	X	X	X	8
(Japan) Shinya Abe	0	0	1	0	X	X	X	X	1

=== Draw 4 ===
Wednesday, October 21, 8:00 pm

Sheet A	1	2	3	4	5	6	7	8	Final
(Italy) Joël Retornaz 🔨	2	1	1	0	1	0	2	X	7
(Ontario) Sam Mooibroek	0	0	0	1	0	1	0	X	2

Sheet B	1	2	3	4	5	6	7	8	Final
(Alberta) Brad Jacobs	1	0	2	0	0	1	0	1	5
(Ontario) Alex Champ 🔨	0	1	0	1	0	0	1	0	3

Sheet C	1	2	3	4	5	6	7	8	9	Final
(Saskatchewan) Tyler Tardi 🔨	2	0	1	0	1	0	2	0	1	7
(Ontario) Nathan Young	0	2	0	1	0	1	0	2	0	6

Sheet D	1	2	3	4	5	6	7	8	9	Final
(Japan) Tsuyoshi Yamaguchi	0	2	0	1	0	2	1	0	2	8
(Ontario) Jordan Chandler 🔨	2	0	1	0	1	0	0	2	0	6

Sheet E	1	2	3	4	5	6	7	8	Final
(Ontario) Charlie Robert 🔨	0	1	0	3	1	2	X	X	7
(Ontario) Team MacEwan	0	0	2	0	0	0	X	X	2

Sheet F	1	2	3	4	5	6	7	8	Final
(Ontario) Justin MacKay	0	0	1	0	0	X	X	X	1
(Ontario) Scott Howard 🔨	3	0	0	0	5	X	X	X	8

=== Draw 5 ===
Thursday, October 22, 10:00 am

Sheet A	1	2	3	4	5	6	7	8	Final
(Manitoba) John Epping 🔨	2	0	3	0	5	X	X	X	10
(Manitoba) Jordon McDonald	0	1	0	2	0	X	X	X	3

Sheet B	1	2	3	4	5	6	7	8	Final
(Saskatchewan) Tyler Tardi 🔨	0	2	2	0	1	0	4	X	9
(Japan) Tsuyoshi Yamaguchi	1	0	0	2	0	1	0	X	4

Sheet C	1	2	3	4	5	6	7	8	Final
(South Korea) Jeong Byeong-jin	0	2	2	0	0	2	0	1	7
(United States) John Shuster 🔨	1	0	0	1	1	0	2	0	5

Sheet D	1	2	3	4	5	6	7	8	Final
(Ontario) Brian Adams Jr. 🔨	0	0	0	2	0	0	2	0	4
(Japan) Shinya Abe	1	0	1	0	0	2	0	3	7

Sheet E	1	2	3	4	5	6	7	8	Final
(Manitoba) Matt Dunstone	0	3	0	3	0	3	X	X	9
(Ontario) Jayden King 🔨	2	0	2	0	1	0	X	X	5

Sheet F	1	2	3	4	5	6	7	8	Final
(Italy) Joël Retornaz 🔨	0	1	0	3	2	0	1	1	8
(Alberta) Brad Jacobs	1	0	2	0	0	3	0	0	6

=== Draw 6 ===
Thursday, October 22, 2:00 pm

Sheet A	1	2	3	4	5	6	7	8	Final
(Ontario) Nathan Young 🔨	0	0	2	4	0	1	X	X	7
(Ontario) Jordan Chandler	0	1	0	0	1	0	X	X	2

Sheet B	1	2	3	4	5	6	7	8	Final
(Ontario) Mike Fournier 🔨	0	1	0	0	0	0	2	0	3
(Quebec) Félix Asselin	0	0	0	1	1	1	0	1	4

Sheet C	1	2	3	4	5	6	7	8	Final
(Ontario) Charlie Robert	0	0	0	0	0	X	X	X	0
(Ontario) Scott Howard 🔨	3	1	1	1	3	X	X	X	9

Sheet D	1	2	3	4	5	6	7	8	Final
(Ontario) Team MacEwan 🔨	4	0	3	0	1	X	X	X	8
(Ontario) Justin MacKay	0	1	0	1	0	X	X	X	2

Sheet E	1	2	3	4	5	6	7	8	Final
(Ontario) J.C. Beecroft 🔨	1	0	0	1	0	1	0	X	3
(Ontario) Team Hunt	0	1	2	0	1	0	1	X	5

Sheet F	1	2	3	4	5	6	7	8	Final
(Ontario) Sam Mooibroek 🔨	1	0	1	1	0	2	0	0	5
(Ontario) Alex Champ	0	1	0	0	1	0	1	1	4

=== Draw 7 ===
Thursday, October 22, 6:00 pm

Sheet A	1	2	3	4	5	6	7	8	Final
(Saskatchewan) Tyler Tardi	0	0	1	0	1	0	1	X	3
(Italy) Joël Retornaz 🔨	0	1	0	1	0	4	0	X	6

Sheet B	1	2	3	4	5	6	7	8	Final
(Ontario) Nathan Young	1	0	0	2	0	1	0	X	4
(United States) John Shuster 🔨	0	1	0	0	2	0	4	X	7

Sheet C	1	2	3	4	5	6	7	8	Final
(Ontario) Sam Mooibroek 🔨	2	0	3	0	0	5	X	X	10
(Manitoba) Jordon McDonald	0	1	0	2	1	0	X	X	4

Sheet D	1	2	3	4	5	6	7	8	Final
(Manitoba) Matt Dunstone 🔨	1	0	0	2	0	0	1	0	4
(Japan) Tsuyoshi Yamaguchi	0	0	1	0	0	2	0	3	6

Sheet E	1	2	3	4	5	6	7	8	Final
(Japan) Shinya Abe 🔨	1	0	2	0	1	0	1	0	5
(Alberta) Brad Jacobs	0	2	0	2	0	1	0	1	6

Sheet F	1	2	3	4	5	6	7	8	Final
(South Korea) Jeong Byeong-jin 🔨	0	0	2	0	0	0	1	0	3
(Manitoba) John Epping	0	1	0	3	0	1	0	1	6

=== Draw 8 ===
Friday, October 23, 9:00 am

Sheet A	1	2	3	4	5	6	7	8	9	Final
(Quebec) Félix Asselin 🔨	0	1	0	2	0	0	3	0	1	7
(South Korea) Jeong Byeong-jin	1	0	1	0	0	3	0	1	0	6

Sheet B	1	2	3	4	5	6	7	8	Final
(United States) John Shuster	0	3	2	0	1	0	3	X	9
(Ontario) Sam Mooibroek 🔨	2	0	0	1	0	1	0	X	4

Sheet D	1	2	3	4	5	6	7	8	Final
(Ontario) Scott Howard	0	1	0	0	1	4	X	X	6
(Saskatchewan) Tyler Tardi 🔨	0	0	0	1	0	0	X	X	1

Sheet F	1	2	3	4	5	6	7	8	Final
(Japan) Tsuyoshi Yamaguchi 🔨	0	0	0	1	0	2	0	1	4
(Alberta) Brad Jacobs	1	0	0	0	1	0	1	0	3

=== Draw 9 ===
Friday, October 23, 12:30 pm

Sheet A	1	2	3	4	5	6	7	8	Final
(United States) John Shuster 🔨	1	1	1	0	1	0	2	0	6
(Ontario) Scott Howard	0	0	0	2	0	2	0	1	5

Sheet B	1	2	3	4	5	6	7	8	Final
(Japan) Tsuyoshi Yamaguchi	0	1	0	1	0	X	X	X	2
(Quebec) Félix Asselin 🔨	2	0	2	0	2	X	X	X	6

Sheet C	1	2	3	4	5	6	7	8	Final
(Ontario) Jayden King 🔨	1	1	2	0	2	2	X	X	8
(Ontario) Brian Adams Jr.	0	0	0	1	0	0	X	X	1

Sheet D	1	2	3	4	5	6	7	8	Final
(Ontario) Jordan Chandler 🔨	0	3	0	0	2	0	0	1	6
(Ontario) Alex Champ	0	0	1	3	0	3	0	0	7

Sheet E	1	2	3	4	5	6	7	8	Final
(Ontario) Mike Fournier 🔨	2	1	0	1	0	2	0	2	8
(Ontario) Team MacEwan	0	0	1	0	1	0	3	0	5

Sheet F	1	2	3	4	5	6	7	8	Final
(Ontario) Charlie Robert	2	0	0	1	0	1	0	X	4
(Ontario) Team Hunt 🔨	0	1	3	0	3	0	1	X	8

=== Draw 10 ===
Friday, October 23, 4:00 pm

Sheet A	1	2	3	4	5	6	7	8	Final
(Ontario) Nathan Young	0	4	2	0	0	1	0	5	12
(Ontario) Team Hunt 🔨	1	0	0	2	3	0	0	0	6

Sheet B	1	2	3	4	5	6	7	8	Final
(Ontario) Alex Champ 🔨	0	0	2	1	0	1	0	X	4
(South Korea) Jeong Byeong-jin	0	1	0	0	2	0	3	X	6

Sheet C	1	2	3	4	5	6	7	8	Final
(Japan) Shinya Abe 🔨	3	1	0	0	0	0	0	0	4
(Ontario) Sam Mooibroek	0	0	2	1	0	1	2	3	9

Sheet D	1	2	3	4	5	6	7	8	Final
(Manitoba) Jordon McDonald	0	1	0	1	0	1	0	X	3
(Alberta) Brad Jacobs 🔨	1	0	1	0	2	0	2	X	6

Sheet E	1	2	3	4	5	6	7	8	Final
(Ontario) Jayden King 🔨	1	0	1	3	1	0	0	1	7
(Saskatchewan) Tyler Tardi	0	2	0	0	0	3	0	0	5

Sheet F	1	2	3	4	5	6	7	8	Final
(Ontario) Mike Fournier 🔨	2	0	0	0	1	X	X	X	3
(Manitoba) Matt Dunstone	0	2	1	4	0	X	X	X	7

=== Draw 11 ===
Friday, October 23, 8:00 pm

Sheet A	1	2	3	4	5	6	7	8	9	Final
(South Korea) Jeong Byeong-jin	0	0	1	0	3	0	2	0	0	6
(Alberta) Brad Jacobs 🔨	2	1	0	1	0	1	0	1	1	7

Sheet B	1	2	3	4	5	6	7	8	Final
(Manitoba) Matt Dunstone 🔨	0	2	0	2	2	X	X	X	6
(Ontario) Scott Howard	0	0	1	0	0	X	X	X	1

Sheet E	1	2	3	4	5	6	7	8	Final
(Ontario) Nathan Young	0	0	0	0	1	0	X	X	1
(Japan) Tsuyoshi Yamaguchi 🔨	1	0	2	3	0	2	X	X	8

Sheet F	1	2	3	4	5	6	7	8	Final
(Ontario) Sam Mooibroek 🔨	1	0	0	0	0	2	0	X	3
(Ontario) Jayden King	0	0	0	0	3	0	3	X	6

== Playoffs ==
Quarterfinals
A1	(Manitoba) John Epping	6
C3	(Ontario) Jayden King	3
B1	(Quebec) Félix Asselin	5
C4	(Manitoba) Matt Dunstone	3
B2	(United States) John Shuster	5
C2	(Alberta) Brad Jacobs	6
A2	(Italy) Joël Retornaz	5
C1	(Japan) Tsuyoshi Yamaguchi	4

Semifinals
A1	(Manitoba) John Epping	4
B1	(Quebec) Félix Asselin	3
C2	(Alberta) Brad Jacobs	2
A2	(Italy) Joël Retornaz	5

Final
A1	(Manitoba) John Epping	5
A2	(Italy) Joël Retornaz	4

=== Quarterfinals ===
Saturday, October 24, 10:00 am

Sheet A	1	2	3	4	5	6	7	8	Final
(Quebec) Félix Asselin 🔨	0	2	0	1	0	1	0	1	5
(Manitoba) Matt Dunstone	0	0	0	0	1	0	2	0	3

Sheet B	1	2	3	4	5	6	7	8	Final
(Manitoba) John Epping 🔨	2	0	2	1	0	0	1	X	6
(Ontario) Jayden King	0	1	0	0	1	1	0	X	3

Sheet E	1	2	3	4	5	6	7	8	Final
(United States) John Shuster 🔨	0	0	1	0	2	0	2	0	5
(Alberta) Brad Jacobs	0	1	0	2	0	2	0	1	6

Sheet F	1	2	3	4	5	6	7	8	9	Final
(Italy) Joël Retornaz 🔨	0	1	0	0	0	3	0	0	1	5
(Japan) Tsuyoshi Yamaguchi	0	0	1	1	0	0	0	2	0	4

=== Semifinals ===
Saturday, October 24, 2:00 pm

Sheet A	1	2	3	4	5	6	7	8	Final
(Alberta) Brad Jacobs	0	0	1	0	0	1	0	X	2
(Italy) Joël Retornaz 🔨	0	2	0	1	1	0	1	X	5

Sheet B	1	2	3	4	5	6	7	8	9	Final
(Manitoba) John Epping 🔨	0	0	0	2	0	1	0	0	1	4
(Quebec) Félix Asselin	0	0	0	0	2	0	0	1	0	3

=== Final ===
Saturday, October 24, 6:00 pm

Sheet A	1	2	3	4	5	6	7	8	Final
(Manitoba) John Epping 🔨	0	1	1	0	1	1	0	1	5
(Italy) Joël Retornaz	0	0	0	2	0	0	2	0	4
