= Mixed Doubles Bern =

World Curling Tour event

- Established: 2017
- Host city: Bern, Switzerland
- Arena: Curling Bern
- Purse: CHF 13,500
- 2026 champion: (Sweden) Westman / Ahlberg

Current edition
- 2026 Mixed Doubles Bern

The Mixed Doubles Bern is an annual mixed doubles curling tournament on the ISS Mixed Doubles World Curling Tour. It is held annually in the fall at Curling Bern in Bern, Switzerland.

The purse for the event is CHF 12,000 and its event categorization is 500 (highest calibre is 1000).

The event has been held since 2017.

== Past champions ==
Year	Winning pair	Runner up pair	Third place	Fourth place	Purse (CHF)
2017	(Russia) Anastasia Bryzgalova / Alexander Krushelnitskiy	(Switzerland) Jenny Perret / Martin Rios	(Switzerland) Michèle Jäggi / Sven Michel	(South Korea) Jang Hye-ji / Lee Ki-jeong	10,000
2018	(Switzerland) Marlene Albrecht / (Canada) Matt Wozniak	(Switzerland) Jenny Perret / Martin Rios	(Scotland) Gina Aitken / Scott Andrews	(Sweden) Malin Wendel / Fabian Wingfors	10,000
2019	(Switzerland) Daniela Rupp / Kevin Wunderlin	(Scotland) Gina Aitken / Scott Andrews	(Switzerland) Jenny Perret / Martin Rios	(Sweden) Therese Westman / Robin Ahlberg	10,000
2020	(Sweden) Isabella Wranå / Rasmus Wranå	(Switzerland) Jenny Perret / Martin Rios	(Switzerland) Lisa Gisler / Romano Meier	(Italy) Alice Cobelli / Amos Mosaner	12,000
2021	(Norway) Kristin Skaslien / Magnus Nedregotten	(Switzerland) Jenny Perret / Martin Rios	(Sweden) Therese Westman / Robin Ahlberg	(Switzerland) Daniela Rupp / Kevin Wunderlin	10,000
2022	(Switzerland) Daniela Rupp / Kevin Wunderlin	(Sweden) Therese Westman / Robin Ahlberg	(Estonia) Karoliine Kaare / Harri Lill	(Germany) Pia-Lisa Schöll / Klaudius Harsch	10,000
2023	Cancelled				
2024	(Scotland) Rebecca Morrison / Bobby Lammie	(Scotland) Jennifer Dodds / Bruce Mouat	(Norway) Kristin Skaslien / Magnus Nedregotten	(Scotland) Sophie Jackson / Duncan McFadzean (Note: No third place game was played.)	10,000
2025	(Australia) Tahli Gill / Dean Hewitt	(Germany) Pia-Lisa Schöll / Joshua Sutor	(China) Ye Zixuan / Yu Sen	(Estonia) Marie Kaldvee / Harri Lill	12,000
2026	(Sweden) Therese Westman / Robin Ahlberg	(Japan) Tori Koana / Go Aoki	(Norway) Maia Ramsfjell / Magnus Ramsfjell	(Switzerland) Jenny Perret / Martin Rios	13,500
