= 2026 Mixed Doubles Bern =

- Host city: Bern, Switzerland
- Arena: Curling Bern
- Dates: October 23–25
- Winner: (Sweden) Westman / Ahlberg
- Female: Therese Westman
- Male: Robin Ahlberg
- Finalist: (Japan) Koana / Aoki

The 2026 Mixed Doubles Bern was held from October 23 to 25 at Curling Bern in Bern, Switzerland. The event was held in a triple-knockout format with a purse of 12,000 CHF. It was held as a partner event of the 2026 Mixed Doubles Gstaad which was played October 27 to 29.

In the final, 2026 world silver medalists Therese Westman and Robin Ahlberg of Sweden scored four in the eighth end to defeat Japan's Tori Koana and Go Aoki 7–5. In was the first time Westman and Ahlberg had won the event in their eight appearances. The pair qualified for the playoffs through the B side before eliminating Scotland's Jennifer Dodds and Orrin Carson in the quarterfinals and Norway's Maia and Magnus Ramsfjell in the semifinals. Koana and Aoki meanwhile were undefeated up until the final, knocking off Canada's Katie Ford and Oliver Campbell in the quarterfinals and Switzerland's Jenny Perret and Martin Rios in the semis. Australia's Jessica Wytrychowski and Dean Hewitt and Scotland's Eve Muirhead and Bobby Lammie also qualified for the playoffs but lost out in the quarterfinals.

In the consolation cup, Germany's Vera Tiuliakova and Sixten Totzek defeated Switzerland's Johanna Blackham and Felix Lüthold. Other teams that did not make the playoffs include Norway's Kristin Skaslien and Magnus Nedregotten, Japan's Chiaki Matsumura and Yasumasa Tanida, Estonia's Karoliine Kaare and Harri Lill, Scotland's Sophie Jackson and Duncan McFadzean and Norway's Eilin Kjærland and Mathias Brænden.

== Teams ==
The teams are listed as follows:

Female	Male	Locale
Carolina Abdel Halim	Gabriel Ferguson	St. Gallen, Switzerland
Stéphanie Barbarin	Wilfrid Coulot	Megève, France
Johanna Blackham	Felix Lüthold	Basel, Switzerland
Jolanda Devaux	Michael Devaux	Baden, Switzerland
Jennifer Dodds	Orrin Carson	Stirling, Scotland
Katie Ford	Oliver Campbell	(Canada) Waterloo, Ontario
Jana-Tamara Hählin	Timo Zingg	Interlaken, Switzerland
Carole Howald	Michael Brunner	Langenthal, Switzerland
Lea Hüppi	Jonas Weiss	Dübendorf, Switzerland
Noëlle Iseli	René Iseli	Gstaad, Switzerland
Sophie Jackson	Duncan McFadzean	Stirling, Scotland
Michèle Jäggi	Romano Keller-Meier	Baden, Switzerland
Linda Joó	Benjamin Kárász	Budapest, Hungary
Karoliine Kaare	Harri Lill	Tallinn, Estonia
Eilin Kjærland	Mathias Brænden	Haugesund, Norway
Tori Koana	Go Aoki	Yamanashi, Japan
Klára Macková	Tomáš Maček	Prague, Czech Republic
Chiaki Matsumura	Yasumasa Tanida	Nagano / Sapporo, Japan
Giorgia Maurino	Simone Gonin	Trentino, Italy
Eve Muirhead	Bobby Lammie	Stirling, Scotland
Richa Patel	P. N. Raju	Hyderabad, India
Jenny Perret	Martin Rios	Glarus, Switzerland
Maia Ramsfjell	Magnus Ramsfjell	Trondheim, Norway
Cindy Schmid	Martin Risi	Engelberg, Switzerland
Briar Schwaller	Dean Hürlimann	Bern, Switzerland
Sophie Sinclair	Robin Brydone	Stirling, Scotland
Kristin Skaslien	Magnus Nedregotten	Oslo, Norway
Vera Tiuliakova	Sixten Totzek	Füssen, Germany
Dorottya Udvardi-Palancsa	Lőrinc Tatár	Budapest, Hungary
Adela Walczak	Andrzej Augustyniak	Łódź, Poland
Therese Westman	Robin Ahlberg	Sundbyberg, Sweden
Jessica Wytrychowski	Dean Hewitt	Brisbane, Australia

== Knockout Brackets ==
=== A Event ===
First Knockout	Qualifier 1
(Norway) Skaslien / Nedregotten	10
(Switzerland) Abdel Halim / Ferguson	6	(Norway) Skaslien / Nedregotten	10
(Estonia) Kaare / Lill	5	(Switzerland) Jäggi / Keller-Meier	4
(Switzerland) Jäggi / Keller-Meier	8	(Norway) Skaslien / Nedregotten	9
(Scotland) Dodds / Carson	5	(Scotland) Dodds / Carson	11
(Italy) Maurino / Gonin	3	(Scotland) Dodds / Carson	10
(Switzerland) Howald / Brunner	8	(Hungary) Joó / Kárász	3
(Hungary) Joó / Kárász	10	(Scotland) Dodds / Carson	5
(Switzerland) Perret / Rios	9	(Japan) Koana / Aoki	6
(India) Patel / Raju	1	(Switzerland) Perret / Rios	4
(Poland) Walczak / Augustyniak	6	(Switzerland) Hüppi / Weiss	9
(Switzerland) Hüppi / Weiss	8	(Switzerland) Hüppi / Weiss	1
(Scotland) Jackson / McFadzean	6	(Japan) Koana / Aoki	10
(Norway) Ramsfjell / Ramsfjell	7	(Norway) Ramsfjell / Ramsfjell	3
(Japan) Koana / Aoki	8	(Japan) Koana / Aoki	10
(Switzerland) Hählin / Zingg	2

First Knockout	Qualifier 2
(Sweden) Westman / Ahlberg	16
(Switzerland) Iseli / Iseli	3	(Sweden) Westman / Ahlberg	8
(Hungary) Udvardi-Palancsa / Tatár	2	(Germany) Tiuliakova / Totzek	7
(Germany) Tiuliakova / Totzek	5	(Sweden) Westman / Ahlberg	10
(Scotland) Muirhead / Lammie	7	(Scotland) Muirhead / Lammie	1
(Czech Republic) Macková / Maček	1	(Scotland) Muirhead / Lammie	8
(Japan) Matsumura / Tanida	8	(Japan) Matsumura / Tanida	6
(Switzerland) Devaux / Devaux	2	(Sweden) Westman / Ahlberg	4
(Australia) Wytrychowski / Hewitt	10	(Australia) Wytrychowski / Hewitt	6
(Switzerland) Blackham / Lüthold	6	(Australia) Wytrychowski / Hewitt	9
(Norway) Kjærland / Brænden	8	(Norway) Kjærland / Brænden	2
(France) Barbarin / Coulot	6	(Australia) Wytrychowski / Hewitt	7
(Scotland) Sinclair / Brydone	7	(Scotland) Sinclair / Brydone	6
(Switzerland) Schwaller / Hürlimann	2	(Scotland) Sinclair / Brydone	10
(Canada) Ford / Campbell	7	(Canada) Ford / Campbell	9
(Switzerland) Schmid / Risi	2

=== B Event ===
Second Knockout	Qualifier 3
(Switzerland) Perret / Rios	9
(Switzerland) Abdel Halim / Ferguson	2	(Estonia) Kaare / Lill	3
(Estonia) Kaare / Lill	7	(Switzerland) Perret / Rios	3
(Scotland) Muirhead / Lammie	7
(Scotland) Muirhead / Lammie	7
(Norway) Ramsfjell / Ramsfjell	3
(Norway) Ramsfjell / Ramsfjell	9
(Italy) Maurino / Gonin	7	(Italy) Maurino / Gonin	4
(Switzerland) Howald / Brunner	4	(Norway) Ramsfjell / Ramsfjell	8
(Scotland) Sinclair / Brydone	3
(Scotland) Muirhead / Lammie	7
(Scotland) Dodds / Carson	1
(Switzerland) Jäggi / Keller-Meier	6
(India) Patel / Raju	5	(Poland) Walczak / Augustyniak	5
(Poland) Walczak / Augustyniak	8	(Switzerland) Jäggi / Keller-Meier	5
(Scotland) Jackson / McFadzean	7
(Hungary) Joó / Kárász	2
(Scotland) Jackson / McFadzean	9	(Scotland) Jackson / McFadzean	9
(Switzerland) Hählin / Zingg	6	(Scotland) Jackson / McFadzean	3
(Scotland) Dodds / Carson	8

Second Knockout	Qualifier 4
(Norway) Kjærland / Brænden	8
(Switzerland) Iseli / Iseli	5	(Hungary) Udvardi-Palancsa / Tatár	2
(Hungary) Udvardi-Palancsa / Tatár	10	(Norway) Kjærland / Brænden	8
(Switzerland) Hüppi / Weiss	5
(Norway) Kjærland / Brænden	9
(Canada) Ford / Campbell	6
(Canada) Ford / Campbell	8
(Czech Republic) Macková / Maček	11	(Czech Republic) Macková / Maček	3
(Switzerland) Devaux / Devaux	4	(Canada) Ford / Campbell	8
(Norway) Skaslien / Nedregotten	5
(Norway) Kjærland / Brænden	3
(Sweden) Westman / Ahlberg	6
(Germany) Tiuliakova / Totzek	7
(Switzerland) Blackham / Lüthold	5	(France) Barbarin / Coulot	6
(France) Barbarin / Coulot	8	(Germany) Tiuliakova / Totzek	6
(Japan) Matsumura / Tanida	4
(Japan) Matsumura / Tanida	9
(Switzerland) Schwaller / Hürlimann	5	(Switzerland) Schmid / Risi	3
(Switzerland) Schmid / Risi	6	(Germany) Tiuliakova / Totzek	7
(Sweden) Westman / Ahlberg	10

=== C Event ===
Third Knockout	Qualifier 5
(Switzerland) Hüppi / Weiss	9
(Switzerland) Abdel Halim / Ferguson	2	(Switzerland) Howald / Brunner	6
(Switzerland) Howald / Brunner	13	(Switzerland) Hüppi / Weiss	3
(Estonia) Kaare / Lill	5
(Japan) Matsumura / Tanida	1
(Estonia) Kaare / Lill	6	(Estonia) Kaare / Lill	8
(Hungary) Joó / Kárász	3	(Estonia) Kaare / Lill	6
(Scotland) Dodds / Carson	7

Third Knockout	Qualifier 6
(France) Barbarin / Coulot	9
(Switzerland) Schmid / Risi	3
(France) Barbarin / Coulot	6
(Scotland) Jackson / McFadzean	7
(Scotland) Jackson / McFadzean	7
(Norway) Ramsfjell / Ramsfjell	8
(Norway) Skaslien / Nedregotten	8
(India) Patel / Raju	2	(Switzerland) Hählin / Zingg	2
(Switzerland) Hählin / Zingg	10	(Norway) Skaslien / Nedregotten	5
(Norway) Ramsfjell / Ramsfjell	7

Third Knockout	Qualifier 7
(Scotland) Sinclair / Brydone	10
(Switzerland) Iseli / Iseli	11	(Switzerland) Iseli / Iseli	9
(Switzerland) Devaux / Devaux	10	(Scotland) Sinclair / Brydone	9
(Germany) Tiuliakova / Totzek	7
(Scotland) Sinclair / Brydone	7
(Canada) Ford / Campbell	8
(Italy) Maurino / Gonin	9
(Czech Republic) Macková / Maček	6
(Italy) Maurino / Gonin	8
(Canada) Ford / Campbell	9

Third Knockout	Qualifier 8
(Switzerland) Jäggi / Keller-Meier	4
(Poland) Walczak / Augustyniak	7	(Poland) Walczak / Augustyniak	11
(Hungary) Udvardi-Palancsa / Tatár	5	(Poland) Walczak / Augustyniak	1
(Switzerland) Perret / Rios	10
(Switzerland) Perret / Rios	7
(Switzerland) Blackham / Lüthold	9	(Switzerland) Blackham / Lüthold	5
(Switzerland) Schwaller / Hürlimann	3	(Switzerland) Perret / Rios	6
(Norway) Kjærland / Brænden	5

== Knockout Results ==
All draw times listed in Central European Time (UTC+01:00).

=== Draw 1 ===
Friday, October 23, 7:30 am

Sheet 1	1	2	3	4	5	6	7	8	Final
(Scotland) Jackson / McFadzean	1	0	2	1	0	0	2	0	6
(Norway) Ramsfjell / Ramsfjell 🔨	0	1	0	0	3	1	0	2	7

Sheet 2	1	2	3	4	5	6	7	8	Final
(Norway) Skaslien / Nedregotten 🔨	4	1	0	0	3	2	0	X	10
(Switzerland) Abdel Halim / Ferguson	0	0	3	1	0	0	2	X	6

Sheet 3	1	2	3	4	5	6	7	8	Final
(Scotland) Dodds / Carson 🔨	1	1	1	0	0	1	0	1	5
(Italy) Maurino / Gonin	0	0	0	1	1	0	1	0	3

Sheet 4	1	2	3	4	5	6	7	8	Final
(Estonia) Kaare / Lill 🔨	0	2	0	1	1	0	1	0	5
(Switzerland) Jäggi / Keller-Meier	1	0	3	0	0	2	0	2	8

Sheet 5	1	2	3	4	5	6	7	8	Final
(Poland) Walczak / Augustyniak 🔨	3	1	0	1	0	1	0	0	6
(Switzerland) Hüppi / Weiss	0	0	2	0	2	0	3	1	8

Sheet 6	1	2	3	4	5	6	7	8	Final
(Switzerland) Howald / Brunner 🔨	4	1	0	0	2	0	1	0	8
(Hungary) Joó / Kárász	0	0	3	1	0	2	0	4	10

Sheet 7	1	2	3	4	5	6	7	8	Final
(Japan) Koana / Aoki	1	0	3	1	0	2	1	X	8
(Switzerland) Hählin / Zingg 🔨	0	1	0	0	1	0	0	X	2

Sheet 8	1	2	3	4	5	6	7	8	Final
(Switzerland) Perret / Rios	1	1	0	3	3	1	X	X	9
(India) Patel / Raju 🔨	0	0	1	0	0	0	X	X	1

=== Draw 2 ===
Friday, October 23, 10:00 am

Sheet 1	1	2	3	4	5	6	7	8	Final
(Norway) Kjærland / Brænden 🔨	0	3	0	3	0	0	0	2	8
(France) Barbarin / Coulot	1	0	1	0	1	2	1	0	6

Sheet 2	1	2	3	4	5	6	7	8	Final
(Sweden) Westman / Ahlberg	1	0	4	0	5	0	6	X	16
(Switzerland) Iseli / Iseli 🔨	0	1	0	1	0	1	0	X	3

Sheet 3	1	2	3	4	5	6	7	8	Final
(Australia) Wytrychowski / Hewitt 🔨	3	0	1	0	4	0	2	X	10
(Switzerland) Blackham / Lüthold	0	3	0	1	0	2	0	X	6

Sheet 4	1	2	3	4	5	6	7	8	Final
(Scotland) Sinclair / Brydone	0	3	1	2	1	0	X	X	7
(Switzerland) Schwaller / Hürlimann 🔨	1	0	0	0	0	1	X	X	2

Sheet 5	1	2	3	4	5	6	7	8	Final
(Hungary) Udvardi-Palancsa / Tatár 🔨	0	0	0	1	0	0	1	X	2
(Germany) Tiuliakova / Totzek	1	1	1	0	1	1	0	X	5

Sheet 6	1	2	3	4	5	6	7	8	Final
(Scotland) Muirhead / Lammie 🔨	2	1	2	2	0	X	X	X	7
(Czech Republic) Macková / Maček	0	0	0	0	1	X	X	X	1

Sheet 7	1	2	3	4	5	6	7	8	Final
(Canada) Ford / Campbell 🔨	2	0	2	0	2	1	X	X	7
(Switzerland) Schmid / Risi	0	1	0	1	0	0	X	X	2

Sheet 8	1	2	3	4	5	6	7	8	Final
(Japan) Matsumura / Tanida 🔨	3	0	2	0	3	X	X	X	8
(Switzerland) Devaux / Devaux	0	1	0	1	0	X	X	X	2

=== Draw 3 ===
Friday, October 23, 12:30 pm

Sheet 1	1	2	3	4	5	6	7	8	Final
(Scotland) Dodds / Carson 🔨	2	1	2	1	0	4	X	X	10
(Hungary) Joó / Kárász	0	0	0	0	3	0	X	X	3

Sheet 2	1	2	3	4	5	6	7	8	Final
(Switzerland) Perret / Rios	0	1	1	0	0	2	0	X	4
(Switzerland) Hüppi / Weiss 🔨	1	0	0	4	1	0	3	X	9

Sheet 3	1	2	3	4	5	6	7	8	Final
(Norway) Skaslien / Nedregotten 🔨	2	2	0	3	1	0	2	X	10
(Switzerland) Jäggi / Keller-Meier	0	0	1	0	0	3	0	X	4

Sheet 4	1	2	3	4	5	6	7	8	Final
(Italy) Maurino / Gonin 🔨	1	1	0	3	0	2	0	X	7
(Switzerland) Howald / Brunner	0	0	1	0	2	0	1	X	4

Sheet 5	1	2	3	4	5	6	7	8	Final
(Norway) Ramsfjell / Ramsfjell 🔨	0	0	3	0	0	0	0	X	3
(Japan) Koana / Aoki	2	1	0	2	1	2	2	X	10

Sheet 6	1	2	3	4	5	6	7	8	Final
(Scotland) Jackson / McFadzean 🔨	0	1	0	4	0	4	0	X	9
(Switzerland) Hählin / Zingg	1	0	2	0	2	0	1	X	6

Sheet 7	1	2	3	4	5	6	7	8	Final
(India) Patel / Raju 🔨	3	0	1	0	0	0	1	0	5
(Poland) Walczak / Augustyniak	0	3	0	2	1	1	0	1	8

Sheet 8	1	2	3	4	5	6	7	8	Final
(Switzerland) Abdel Halim / Ferguson 🔨	0	0	1	0	0	1	0	X	2
(Estonia) Kaare / Lill	2	1	0	1	1	0	2	X	7

=== Draw 4 ===
Friday, October 23, 4:00 pm

Sheet 1	1	2	3	4	5	6	7	8	9	Final
(Scotland) Sinclair / Brydone	0	0	3	4	0	1	0	1	1	10
(Canada) Ford / Campbell 🔨	4	1	0	0	2	0	2	0	0	9

Sheet 2	1	2	3	4	5	6	7	8	Final
(Australia) Wytrychowski / Hewitt 🔨	4	2	0	3	X	X	X	X	9
(Norway) Kjærland / Brænden	0	0	2	0	X	X	X	X	2

Sheet 3	1	2	3	4	5	6	7	8	Final
(Scotland) Muirhead / Lammie	2	2	0	2	1	1	0	X	8
(Japan) Matsumura / Tanida 🔨	0	0	4	0	0	0	2	X	6

Sheet 4	1	2	3	4	5	6	7	8	Final
(Switzerland) Iseli / Iseli	1	1	0	0	3	0	0	0	5
(Hungary) Udvardi-Palancsa / Tatár 🔨	0	0	3	2	0	1	2	2	10

Sheet 5	1	2	3	4	5	6	7	8	Final
(Czech Republic) Macková / Maček 🔨	1	0	3	3	0	0	4	X	11
(Switzerland) Devaux / Devaux	0	1	0	0	2	1	0	X	4

Sheet 6	1	2	3	4	5	6	7	8	Final
(Switzerland) Schwaller / Hürlimann	0	1	0	3	0	0	1	0	5
(Switzerland) Schmid / Risi 🔨	1	0	1	0	1	1	0	2	6

Sheet 7	1	2	3	4	5	6	7	8	Final
(Switzerland) Blackham / Lüthold	1	0	2	0	1	0	1	0	5
(France) Barbarin / Coulot 🔨	0	1	0	1	0	5	0	1	8

Sheet 8	1	2	3	4	5	6	7	8	9	Final
(Sweden) Westman / Ahlberg 🔨	2	0	1	1	0	1	0	2	1	8
(Germany) Tiuliakova / Totzek	0	3	0	0	1	0	3	0	0	7

=== Draw 5 ===
Friday, October 23, 6:30 pm

Sheet 1	1	2	3	4	5	6	7	8	Final
(Switzerland) Jäggi / Keller-Meier	1	1	0	2	0	1	0	1	6
(Poland) Walczak / Augustyniak 🔨	0	0	1	0	2	0	2	0	5

Sheet 2	1	2	3	4	5	6	7	8	Final
(Switzerland) Abdel Halim / Ferguson	0	0	1	0	1	0	X	X	2
(Switzerland) Howald / Brunner 🔨	1	2	0	6	0	4	X	X	13

Sheet 3	1	2	3	4	5	6	7	8	Final
(India) Patel / Raju	0	0	0	1	0	1	0	X	2
(Switzerland) Hählin / Zingg 🔨	2	3	1	0	1	0	3	X	10

Sheet 4	1	2	3	4	5	6	7	8	Final
(Switzerland) Perret / Rios 🔨	3	1	0	4	0	1	X	X	9
(Estonia) Kaare / Lill	0	0	2	0	1	0	X	X	3

Sheet 5	1	2	3	4	5	6	7	8	Final
(Norway) Skaslien / Nedregotten	0	3	0	3	0	0	3	0	9
(Scotland) Dodds / Carson 🔨	4	0	1	0	2	1	0	3	11

Sheet 6	1	2	3	4	5	6	7	8	Final
(Switzerland) Hüppi / Weiss 🔨	0	0	0	0	1	0	X	X	1
(Japan) Koana / Aoki	1	2	3	1	0	3	X	X	10

Sheet 7	1	2	3	4	5	6	7	8	Final
(Hungary) Joó / Kárász	0	0	1	0	1	0	X	X	2
(Scotland) Jackson / McFadzean 🔨	2	1	0	5	0	1	X	X	9

Sheet 8	1	2	3	4	5	6	7	8	Final
(Norway) Ramsfjell / Ramsfjell 🔨	0	3	0	2	0	4	X	X	9
(Italy) Maurino / Gonin	1	0	1	0	2	0	X	X	4

=== Draw 6 ===
Friday, October 23, 9:00 pm

Sheet 1	1	2	3	4	5	6	7	8	Final
(Norway) Kjærland / Brænden 🔨	0	2	0	1	1	4	X	X	8
(Hungary) Udvardi-Palancsa / Tatár	1	0	1	0	0	0	X	X	2

Sheet 2	1	2	3	4	5	6	7	8	Final
(Canada) Ford / Campbell 🔨	4	1	0	1	0	2	0	X	8
(Czech Republic) Macková / Maček	0	0	1	0	1	0	1	X	3

Sheet 3	1	2	3	4	5	6	7	8	Final
(Germany) Tiuliakova / Totzek 🔨	1	0	3	0	1	1	0	1	7
(France) Barbarin / Coulot	0	3	0	2	0	0	1	0	6

Sheet 4	1	2	3	4	5	6	7	8	Final
(Sweden) Westman / Ahlberg 🔨	3	2	1	0	4	X	X	X	10
(Scotland) Muirhead / Lammie	0	0	0	1	0	X	X	X	1

Sheet 5	1	2	3	4	5	6	7	8	Final
(Switzerland) Blackham / Lüthold 🔨	5	0	3	0	0	1	X	X	9
(Switzerland) Schwaller / Hürlimann	0	1	0	1	1	0	X	X	3

Sheet 6	1	2	3	4	5	6	7	8	Final
(Australia) Wytrychowski / Hewitt 🔨	1	0	3	0	0	3	0	0	7
(Scotland) Sinclair / Brydone	0	1	0	1	2	0	1	1	6

Sheet 7	1	2	3	4	5	6	7	8	Final
(Switzerland) Iseli / Iseli 🔨	3	1	0	4	0	0	0	3	11
(Switzerland) Devaux / Devaux	0	0	2	0	5	1	2	0	10

Sheet 8	1	2	3	4	5	6	7	8	Final
(Japan) Matsumura / Tanida 🔨	4	0	0	0	2	1	2	X	9
(Switzerland) Schmid / Risi	0	1	1	1	0	0	0	X	3

=== Draw 7 ===
Saturday, October 24, 7:30 am

Sheet 1	1	2	3	4	5	6	7	8	Final
(Switzerland) Perret / Rios	0	1	1	0	0	1	0	X	3
(Scotland) Muirhead / Lammie 🔨	2	0	0	2	2	0	1	X	7

Sheet 2	1	2	3	4	5	6	7	8	Final
(Germany) Tiuliakova / Totzek 🔨	1	0	2	0	1	0	2	0	6
(Japan) Matsumura / Tanida	0	1	0	1	0	1	0	1	4

Sheet 3	1	2	3	4	5	6	7	8	Final
(Norway) Ramsfjell / Ramsfjell 🔨	2	2	1	0	2	1	X	X	8
(Scotland) Sinclair / Brydone	0	0	0	3	0	0	X	X	3

Sheet 4	1	2	3	4	5	6	7	8	Final
(Switzerland) Jäggi / Keller-Meier 🔨	1	0	1	0	2	0	0	1	5
(Scotland) Jackson / McFadzean	0	3	0	2	0	1	1	0	7

Sheet 5	1	2	3	4	5	6	7	8	Final
(Norway) Kjærland / Brænden 🔨	3	2	0	1	0	1	0	1	8
(Switzerland) Hüppi / Weiss	0	0	2	0	1	0	2	0	5

Sheet 6	1	2	3	4	5	6	7	8	Final
(Canada) Ford / Campbell 🔨	1	0	4	0	1	0	1	1	8
(Norway) Skaslien / Nedregotten	0	2	0	2	0	1	0	0	5

Sheet 7	1	2	3	4	5	6	7	8	Final
(Poland) Walczak / Augustyniak	0	3	0	0	0	3	1	X	7
(Hungary) Udvardi-Palancsa / Tatár 🔨	1	0	1	2	1	0	0	X	5

Sheet 8	1	2	3	4	5	6	7	8	Final
(Estonia) Kaare / Lill 🔨	1	1	0	2	1	1	0	X	6
(Hungary) Joó / Kárász	0	0	2	0	0	0	1	X	3

=== Draw 8 ===
Saturday, October 24, 10:00 am

Sheet 2	1	2	3	4	5	6	7	8	Final
(France) Barbarin / Coulot 🔨	3	1	0	2	0	1	2	X	9
(Switzerland) Schmid / Risi	0	0	2	0	1	0	0	X	3

Sheet 3	1	2	3	4	5	6	7	8	Final
(Switzerland) Perret / Rios	0	0	0	0	3	0	2	2	7
(Switzerland) Blackham / Lüthold 🔨	1	1	1	1	0	1	0	0	5

Sheet 4	1	2	3	4	5	6	7	8	Final
(Scotland) Dodds / Carson	0	0	3	0	1	0	1	X	5
(Japan) Koana / Aoki 🔨	1	1	0	3	0	1	0	X	6

Sheet 5	1	2	3	4	5	6	7	8	Final
(Sweden) Westman / Ahlberg	0	1	0	1	0	1	0	1	4
(Australia) Wytrychowski / Hewitt 🔨	1	0	2	0	1	0	2	0	6

Sheet 6	1	2	3	4	5	6	7	8	Final
(Switzerland) Hüppi / Weiss	0	1	1	1	1	0	2	3	9
(Switzerland) Howald / Brunner 🔨	4	0	0	0	0	2	0	0	6

Sheet 7	1	2	3	4	5	6	7	8	Final
(Italy) Maurino / Gonin	0	1	0	4	2	0	2	X	9
(Czech Republic) Macková / Maček 🔨	2	0	3	0	0	1	0	X	6

=== Draw 9 ===
Saturday, October 24, 12:30 pm

Sheet 1	1	2	3	4	5	6	7	8	Final
(Scotland) Sinclair / Brydone 🔨	0	1	0	2	0	3	0	4	10
(Switzerland) Iseli / Iseli	1	0	1	0	3	0	4	0	9

Sheet 2	1	2	3	4	5	6	7	8	Final
(Scotland) Muirhead / Lammie 🔨	3	0	1	1	0	1	1	X	7
(Norway) Ramsfjell / Ramsfjell	0	2	0	0	1	0	0	X	3

Sheet 3	1	2	3	4	5	6	7	8	Final
(Scotland) Jackson / McFadzean	0	1	1	0	0	1	0	X	3
(Scotland) Dodds / Carson 🔨	2	0	0	2	1	0	3	X	8

Sheet 4	1	2	3	4	5	6	7	8	Final
(Norway) Skaslien / Nedregotten 🔨	3	0	1	2	0	2	X	X	8
(Switzerland) Hählin / Zingg	0	1	0	0	1	0	X	X	2

Sheet 5	1	2	3	4	5	6	7	8	Final
(Japan) Matsumura / Tanida	0	1	0	0	0	X	X	X	1
(Estonia) Kaare / Lill 🔨	1	0	2	3	2	X	X	X	8

Sheet 6	1	2	3	4	5	6	7	8	Final
(Germany) Tiuliakova / Totzek 🔨	2	0	3	0	1	0	1	0	7
(Sweden) Westman / Ahlberg	0	1	0	3	0	4	0	2	10

Sheet 7	1	2	3	4	5	6	7	8	Final
(Norway) Kjærland / Brænden	2	0	1	0	1	1	0	4	9
(Canada) Ford / Campbell 🔨	0	2	0	2	0	0	2	0	6

Sheet 8	1	2	3	4	5	6	7	8	Final
(Switzerland) Jäggi / Keller-Meier	0	2	0	0	2	0	X	X	4
(Poland) Walczak / Augustyniak 🔨	2	0	4	3	0	2	X	X	11

=== Draw 11 ===
Saturday, October 24, 6:30 pm

Sheet 1	1	2	3	4	5	6	7	8	Final
(Switzerland) Hüppi / Weiss 🔨	1	0	0	0	0	2	0	X	3
(Estonia) Kaare / Lill	0	1	1	1	1	0	1	X	5

Sheet 2	1	2	3	4	5	6	7	8	Final
(Poland) Walczak / Augustyniak	0	1	0	0	0	X	X	X	1
(Switzerland) Perret / Rios 🔨	1	0	2	1	6	X	X	X	10

Sheet 3	1	2	3	4	5	6	7	8	Final
(Scotland) Sinclair / Brydone 🔨	0	3	0	1	0	2	0	3	9
(Germany) Tiuliakova / Totzek	1	0	2	0	1	0	3	0	7

Sheet 4	1	2	3	4	5	6	7	8	Final
(Norway) Kjærland / Brænden 🔨	1	1	0	0	0	1	0	0	3
(Sweden) Westman / Ahlberg	0	0	1	1	1	0	2	1	6

Sheet 5	1	2	3	4	5	6	7	8	Final
(Scotland) Muirhead / Lammie 🔨	1	1	0	4	1	X	X	X	7
(Scotland) Dodds / Carson	0	0	1	0	0	X	X	X	1

Sheet 6	1	2	3	4	5	6	7	8	9	Final
(France) Barbarin / Coulot	1	3	0	0	0	0	2	0	0	6
(Scotland) Jackson / McFadzean 🔨	0	0	2	1	1	1	0	1	1	7

Sheet 7	1	2	3	4	5	6	7	8	Final
(Norway) Skaslien / Nedregotten 🔨	1	0	1	1	0	0	2	0	5
(Norway) Ramsfjell / Ramsfjell	0	3	0	0	1	2	0	1	7

Sheet 8	1	2	3	4	5	6	7	8	9	Final
(Italy) Maurino / Gonin	0	2	0	3	0	1	0	2	0	8
(Canada) Ford / Campbell 🔨	1	0	1	0	3	0	3	0	1	9

=== Draw 12 ===
Saturday, October 24, 9:00 pm

Sheet 3	1	2	3	4	5	6	7	8	Final
(Estonia) Kaare / Lill	2	0	2	0	1	0	1	0	6
(Scotland) Dodds / Carson 🔨	0	2	0	3	0	1	0	1	7

Sheet 4	1	2	3	4	5	6	7	8	9	Final
(Scotland) Sinclair / Brydone 🔨	1	0	1	0	2	1	1	1	0	7
(Canada) Ford / Campbell	0	4	0	3	0	0	0	0	1	8

Sheet 5	1	2	3	4	5	6	7	8	Final
(Scotland) Jackson / McFadzean	1	0	0	1	0	2	0	3	7
(Norway) Ramsfjell / Ramsfjell 🔨	0	2	1	0	4	0	1	0	8

Sheet 6	1	2	3	4	5	6	7	8	Final
(Switzerland) Perret / Rios	0	0	1	0	2	2	0	1	6
(Norway) Kjærland / Brænden 🔨	2	1	0	1	0	0	1	0	5

== Skins game ==
Saturday, October 24, 4:00 pm

Values (CHF)	100	100	150	150	200	300	-	-		1,000
Sheet 3	1	2	3	4	5	6	7	8	Button	Total
(Japan) Koana / Aoki				0	2		-	-		350
(Australia) Wytrychowski / Hewitt 🔨	0	2	1			0	-	-	✓	650

== Playoffs ==
Quarterfinals
A2	(Australia) Wytrychowski / Hewitt	6
C2	(Norway) Ramsfjell / Ramsfjell	8
B2	(Sweden) Westman / Ahlberg	9
C1	(Scotland) Dodds / Carson	4
A1	(Japan) Koana / Aoki	8
C3	(Canada) Ford / Campbell	4
B1	(Scotland) Muirhead / Lammie	8
C4	(Switzerland) Perret / Rios	9

Semifinals
C2	(Norway) Ramsfjell / Ramsfjell	2
B2	(Sweden) Westman / Ahlberg	8
A1	(Japan) Koana / Aoki	6
C4	(Switzerland) Perret / Rios	0

Final
B2	(Sweden) Westman / Ahlberg	7
A1	(Japan) Koana / Aoki	5

=== Quarterfinals ===
Sunday, October 25, 9:00 am

Sheet 3	1	2	3	4	5	6	7	8	9	Final
(Scotland) Muirhead / Lammie 🔨	2	0	0	1	0	4	0	1	0	8
(Switzerland) Perret / Rios	0	3	2	0	1	0	2	0	1	9

Sheet 4	1	2	3	4	5	6	7	8	Final
(Australia) Wytrychowski / Hewitt 🔨	1	3	0	0	1	0	1	0	6
(Norway) Ramsfjell / Ramsfjell	0	0	2	2	0	3	0	1	8

Sheet 5	1	2	3	4	5	6	7	8	Final
(Japan) Koana / Aoki 🔨	2	0	1	0	2	0	3	X	8
(Canada) Ford / Campbell	0	1	0	2	0	1	0	X	4

Sheet 6	1	2	3	4	5	6	7	8	Final
(Sweden) Westman / Ahlberg 🔨	2	1	0	4	0	2	X	X	9
(Scotland) Dodds / Carson	0	0	1	0	3	0	X	X	4

=== Semifinals ===
Sunday, October 25, 12:00 pm

Sheet 4	1	2	3	4	5	6	7	8	Final
(Japan) Koana / Aoki 🔨	3	3	X	X	X	X	X	X	6
(Switzerland) Perret / Rios	0	0	X	X	X	X	X	X	0

Sheet 5	1	2	3	4	5	6	7	8	Final
(Norway) Ramsfjell / Ramsfjell	1	0	0	0	1	0	X	X	2
(Sweden) Westman / Ahlberg 🔨	0	1	2	3	0	2	X	X	8

=== Final ===
Sunday, October 25, 3:30 pm

Sheet 5	1	2	3	4	5	6	7	8	Final
(Sweden) Westman / Ahlberg	0	1	0	1	0	1	0	4	7
(Japan) Koana / Aoki 🔨	1	0	1	0	1	0	2	0	5
