= 2023 Oslo Cup =

- Host city: Oslo, Norway
- Arena: Snarøya Curling Club
- Dates: August 31 – September 3
- Men's winner: (Switzerland) Team Hösli
- Curling club: CC Glarus, Glarus
- Skip: Marco Hösli
- Third: Philipp Hösli
- Second: Simon Gloor
- Lead: Justin Hausherr
- Finalist: (Switzerland) Yannick Schwaller
- Women's winner: (Sweden) Team Hasselborg
- Curling club: Sundbybergs CK, Sundbyberg
- Skip: Anna Hasselborg
- Third: Sara McManus
- Second: Agnes Knochenhauer
- Lead: Sofia Mabergs
- Alternate: Johanna Heldin
- Coach: Kristian Lindström
- Finalist: (Norway) Marianne Rørvik

The 2023 Oslo Cup was held from August 31 to September 3 at the Snarøya Curling Club in Oslo, Norway. The event was held in a round robin format with a purse of NOK 112,000 on the men's side and NOK 88,000 on the women's side. It was the first event of the 2023–24 Nordic Curling Tour.

== Men ==
=== Teams ===
The teams are listed as follows:

Skip	Third	Second	Lead	Alternate	Locale
Kjetil Bjørke	Tor Fredriksen	Håvard Lundhaug	Lasse Vinje		Bygdøy, Norway
Michael Brunner	Anthony Petoud	Romano Meier	Andreas Gerlach		Bern, Switzerland
James Craik	Mark Watt	Angus Bryce	Blair Haswell		Forfar, Scotland
Niklas Edin	Oskar Eriksson	Rasmus Wranå	Christoffer Sundgren		Karlstad, Sweden
Wouter Gösgens	Laurens Hoekman	Jaap van Dorp	Tobias van den Hurk	Alexander Magan	Zoetermeer, Netherlands
Andreas Hårstad	Mathias Brænden	Michael Mellemseter	Willhelm Næss		Oppdal, Norway
Marco Hösli	Philipp Hösli	Simon Gloor	Justin Hausherr		Glarus, Switzerland
Lukas Høstmælingen	Grunde Buraas	Magnus Lillebø	Tinius Haslev Nordbye		Oslo, Norway
Lukáš Klíma	Marek Černovský	Martin Jurík	Lukáš Klípa	Radek Boháč	Prague, Czech Republic
Axel Landelius	Alfons Johansson	Johan Engqvist	Alexander Palm		Mjölby, Sweden
Markus Dale (Fourth)	Anders Mjøen (Skip)	Emil Sæther	Jonathan Sætheren		Oppdal, Norway
Fredrik Nyman	Patric Mabergs	Simon Olofsson	Johannes Patz		Sollefteå, Sweden
Magnus Ramsfjell	Martin Sesaker	Bendik Ramsfjell	Gaute Nepstad		Trondheim, Norway
Benoît Schwarz-van Berkel (Fourth)	Yannick Schwaller (Skip)	Sven Michel	Pablo Lachat		Geneva, Switzerland
Kyle Waddell	Craig Waddell	Mark Taylor	Gavin Barr		Hamilton, Scotland

=== Round robin standings ===
Final Round Robin Standings

Key
Teams to Playoffs

Pool A	W	L	PF	PA	DSC
(Switzerland) Michael Brunner	3	1	21	16	40.00
(Sweden) Niklas Edin	3	1	23	14	81.00
(Norway) Lukas Høstmælingen	3	1	22	16	150.00
(Norway) Anders Mjøen	1	3	18	20	285.00
(Norway) Kjetil Bjørke	0	4	11	29	146.00

Pool B	W	L	PF	PA	DSC
(Switzerland) Yannick Schwaller	4	0	29	15	38.00
(Scotland) Kyle Waddell	3	1	22	14	0.00
(Sweden) Fredrik Nyman	2	2	21	22	30.00
(Sweden) Axel Landelius	1	3	14	26	167.00
(Scotland) James Craik	0	4	17	26	4.00

Pool C	W	L	PF	PA	DSC
(Switzerland) Marco Hösli	4	0	28	14	27.00
(Norway) Magnus Ramsfjell	3	1	25	17	126.00
(Norway) Andreas Hårstad	2	2	13	23	100.00
(Czech Republic) Lukáš Klíma	1	3	16	21	22.00
(Netherlands) Wouter Gösgens	0	4	19	26	130.00

=== Round robin results ===
All draw times are listed in Central European Summer Time (UTC+02:00).

==== Draw 1 ====
Thursday, August 31, 3:00 pm

Sheet B	1	2	3	4	5	6	7	8	Final
(Norway) Kjetil Bjørke	1	1	1	0	0	0	2	X	5
(Switzerland) Michael Brunner	0	0	0	3	2	2	0	X	7

Sheet C	1	2	3	4	5	6	7	8	Final
(Sweden) Fredrik Nyman	0	1	0	0	0	0	0	X	1
(Scotland) Kyle Waddell	0	0	0	1	1	1	1	X	4

Sheet D	1	2	3	4	5	6	7	8	Final
(Norway) Anders Mjøen	0	1	0	1	0	0	1	X	3
(Sweden) Niklas Edin	2	0	4	0	1	0	0	X	7

==== Draw 2 ====
Thursday, August 31, 5:45 pm

Sheet A	1	2	3	4	5	6	7	8	Final
(Scotland) James Craik	1	0	0	2	1	1	0	0	5
(Sweden) Axel Landelius	0	1	1	0	0	0	3	1	6

Sheet B	1	2	3	4	5	6	7	8	Final
(Netherlands) Wouter Gösgens	0	0	3	0	0	0	1	0	4
(Norway) Andreas Hårstad	1	0	0	0	2	1	0	1	5

==== Draw 3 ====
Thursday, August 31, 9:00 pm

Sheet A	1	2	3	4	5	6	7	8	Final
(Switzerland) Marco Hösli	0	1	0	1	0	1	1	1	5
(Czech Republic) Lukáš Klíma	1	0	1	0	1	0	0	0	3

==== Draw 4 ====
Friday, September 1, 8:00 am

Sheet D	1	2	3	4	5	6	7	8	Final
(Switzerland) Michael Brunner	0	1	0	1	0	1	1	0	4
(Norway) Lukas Høstmælingen	1	0	1	0	1	0	0	2	5

==== Draw 5 ====
Friday, September 1, 8:30 am

Sheet E	1	2	3	4	5	6	7	8	Final
(Sweden) Axel Landelius	0	0	0	1	0	X	X	X	1
(Switzerland) Yannick Schwaller	2	3	0	0	3	X	X	X	8

Sheet F	1	2	3	4	5	6	7	8	Final
(Norway) Andreas Hårstad	0	1	0	2	0	0	0	X	3
(Norway) Magnus Ramsfjell	2	0	1	0	1	1	3	X	8

==== Draw 6 ====
Friday, September 1, 11:00 am

Sheet C	1	2	3	4	5	6	7	8	Final
(Norway) Anders Mjøen	1	2	2	3	X	X	X	X	8
(Norway) Kjetil Bjørke	0	0	0	0	X	X	X	X	0

Sheet D	1	2	3	4	5	6	7	8	9	Final
(Sweden) Fredrik Nyman	0	0	2	0	2	1	0	2	1	8
(Scotland) James Craik	1	3	0	2	0	0	1	0	0	7

==== Draw 7 ====
Friday, September 1, 11:30 am

Sheet E	1	2	3	4	5	6	7	8	9	Final
(Switzerland) Marco Hösli	0	1	0	1	3	1	0	0	1	7
(Netherlands) Wouter Gösgens	1	0	1	0	0	0	3	1	0	6

==== Draw 8 ====
Friday, September 1, 2:30 pm

Sheet A	1	2	3	4	5	6	7	8	Final
(Norway) Lukas Høstmælingen	0	0	0	0	1	0	2	X	3
(Sweden) Niklas Edin	2	1	0	1	0	1	0	X	5

Sheet B	1	2	3	4	5	6	7	8	Final
(Switzerland) Yannick Schwaller	0	2	0	0	2	0	3	1	8
(Scotland) Kyle Waddell	1	0	1	1	0	2	0	0	5

Sheet C	1	2	3	4	5	6	7	8	Final
(Norway) Magnus Ramsfjell	0	0	0	2	1	0	2	X	5
(Czech Republic) Lukáš Klíma	0	0	1	0	0	2	0	X	3

==== Draw 10 ====
Friday, September 1, 5:30 pm

Sheet B	1	2	3	4	5	6	7	8	Final
(Switzerland) Michael Brunner	1	0	1	2	0	0	0	1	5
(Norway) Anders Mjøen	0	1	0	0	0	2	0	0	3

Sheet C	1	2	3	4	5	6	7	8	Final
(Sweden) Axel Landelius	0	0	0	3	0	0	1	X	4
(Sweden) Fredrik Nyman	2	0	0	0	3	1	0	X	6

Sheet D	1	2	3	4	5	6	7	8	Final
(Norway) Andreas Hårstad	0	0	0	0	0	X	X	X	0
(Switzerland) Marco Hösli	1	2	3	0	2	X	X	X	8

==== Draw 12 ====
Friday, September 1, 9:00 pm

Sheet A	1	2	3	4	5	6	7	8	Final
(Netherlands) Wouter Gösgens	0	0	1	0	2	0	0	X	3
(Norway) Magnus Ramsfjell	0	0	0	2	0	2	3	X	7

==== Draw 13 ====
Friday, September 1, 9:20 pm

Sheet E	1	2	3	4	5	6	7	8	Final
(Scotland) James Craik	0	0	0	2	0	1	0	X	3
(Switzerland) Yannick Schwaller	0	0	2	0	1	0	3	X	6

Sheet F	1	2	3	4	5	6	7	8	Final
(Norway) Kjetil Bjørke	0	0	1	0	1	0	1	X	3
(Norway) Lukas Høstmælingen	1	1	0	3	0	1	0	X	6

==== Draw 14 ====
Saturday, September 2, 8:00 am

Sheet A	1	2	3	4	5	6	7	8	Final
(Czech Republic) Lukáš Klíma	1	0	1	0	1	0	0	X	3
(Norway) Andreas Hårstad	0	1	0	2	0	1	1	X	5

==== Draw 15 ====
Saturday, September 2, 8:30 am

Sheet E	1	2	3	4	5	6	7	8	Final
(Sweden) Niklas Edin	0	0	1	0	2	0	0	0	3
(Switzerland) Michael Brunner	0	2	0	1	0	1	0	1	5

Sheet F	1	2	3	4	5	6	7	8	Final
(Scotland) Kyle Waddell	2	0	0	0	0	2	1	2	7
(Sweden) Axel Landelius	0	0	0	0	3	0	0	0	3

==== Draw 16 ====
Saturday, September 2, 10:45 am

Sheet D	1	2	3	4	5	6	7	8	Final
(Norway) Lukas Høstmælingen	0	3	0	2	0	2	1	X	8
(Norway) Anders Mjøen	1	0	1	0	2	0	0	X	4

==== Draw 17 ====
Saturday, September 2, 11:15 am

Sheet E	1	2	3	4	5	6	7	8	Final
(Switzerland) Yannick Schwaller	2	1	0	1	0	0	0	3	7
(Sweden) Fredrik Nyman	0	0	2	0	1	2	1	0	6

Sheet F	1	2	3	4	5	6	7	8	Final
(Norway) Magnus Ramsfjell	2	0	0	3	0	0	0	X	5
(Switzerland) Marco Hösli	0	0	3	0	3	1	1	X	8

==== Draw 18 ====
Saturday, September 2, 1:45 pm

Sheet A	1	2	3	4	5	6	7	8	Final
(Scotland) Kyle Waddell	0	2	3	0	1	0	X	X	6
(Scotland) James Craik	0	0	0	1	0	1	X	X	2

==== Draw 19 ====
Saturday, September 2, 2:15 pm

Sheet E	1	2	3	4	5	6	7	8	9	Final
(Czech Republic) Lukáš Klíma	0	2	0	2	0	2	0	0	1	7
(Netherlands) Wouter Gösgens	0	0	1	0	2	0	2	1	0	6

Sheet F	1	2	3	4	5	6	7	8	Final
(Sweden) Niklas Edin	0	1	3	0	4	X	X	X	8
(Norway) Kjetil Bjørke	2	0	0	1	0	X	X	X	3

=== Playoffs ===
Quarterfinals
1	(Switzerland) Marco Hösli	5
8	(Sweden) Fredrik Nyman	2
4	(Switzerland) Michael Brunner	7
5	(Sweden) Niklas Edin	2
2	(Switzerland) Yannick Schwaller	7
7	(Norway) Lukas Høstmælingen	2
3	(Scotland) Kyle Waddell	3
6	(Norway) Magnus Ramsfjell	5

Semifinals
1	(Switzerland) Marco Hösli	5
4	(Switzerland) Michael Brunner	1
2	(Switzerland) Yannick Schwaller	9
6	(Norway) Magnus Ramsfjell	3

Final
1	(Switzerland) Marco Hösli	6
2	(Switzerland) Yannick Schwaller	3
Third place
4	(Switzerland) Michael Brunner	7
6	(Norway) Magnus Ramsfjell	6

==== Quarterfinals ====
Sunday, September 3, 8:00 am

Sheet A	1	2	3	4	5	6	7	8	Final
(Switzerland) Michael Brunner	2	0	0	2	2	1	X	X	7
(Sweden) Niklas Edin	0	2	0	0	0	0	X	X	2

Sheet B	1	2	3	4	5	6	7	8	Final
(Scotland) Kyle Waddell	0	0	1	0	1	1	0	0	3
(Norway) Magnus Ramsfjell	0	0	0	2	0	0	2	1	5

Sheet C	1	2	3	4	5	6	7	8	Final
(Switzerland) Marco Hösli	1	1	0	0	2	0	0	1	5
(Sweden) Fredrik Nyman	0	0	0	1	0	1	0	0	2

Sheet D	1	2	3	4	5	6	7	8	Final
(Switzerland) Yannick Schwaller	1	0	0	2	0	1	3	X	7
(Norway) Lukas Høstmælingen	0	0	1	0	1	0	0	X	2

==== Semifinals ====
Sunday, September 3, 11:30 am

Sheet A	1	2	3	4	5	6	7	8	Final
(Switzerland) Marco Hösli	0	0	1	2	1	0	1	X	5
(Switzerland) Michael Brunner	0	0	0	0	0	1	0	X	1

Sheet C	1	2	3	4	5	6	7	8	Final
(Switzerland) Yannick Schwaller	4	0	1	0	4	X	X	X	9
(Norway) Magnus Ramsfjell	0	2	0	1	0	X	X	X	3

==== Third place game ====
Sunday, September 3, 3:00 pm

Sheet C	1	2	3	4	5	6	7	8	9	Final
(Switzerland) Michael Brunner	0	2	0	1	2	0	1	0	1	7
(Norway) Magnus Ramsfjell	0	0	3	0	0	2	0	1	0	6

==== Final ====
Sunday, September 3, 3:00 pm

Sheet D	1	2	3	4	5	6	7	8	Final
(Switzerland) Marco Hösli	0	2	0	0	1	0	2	1	6
(Switzerland) Yannick Schwaller	1	0	0	1	0	1	0	0	3

== Women ==
=== Teams ===
The teams are listed as follows:

Skip	Third	Second	Lead	Alternate	Locale
Torild Bjørnstad	Nora Østgård	Ingeborg Forbregd	Eilin Kjærland		Oppdal, Norway
Lucy Blair	Karlyn Lyon	Amy Mitchell	Susie Smith		Stirling, Scotland
Stefania Constantini	Marta Lo Deserto	Angela Romei	Giulia Zardini Lacedelli	Elena Mathis	Cortina d'Ampezzo, Italy
Moa Dryburgh	Thea Orefjord	Moa Tjärnlund	Moa Nilsson		Sundbyberg, Sweden
Madeleine Dupont	Mathilde Halse	Denise Dupont	My Larsen	Jasmin Lander	Hvidovre, Denmark
Anna Hasselborg	Sara McManus	Agnes Knochenhauer	Sofia Mabergs	Johanna Heldin	Sundbyberg, Sweden
Fay Henderson	Hailey Duff	Amy MacDonald	Katie McMillan		Stirling, Scotland
Corrie Hürlimann	Celine Schwizgebel	Sarah Müller	Marina Lörtscher	Briar Schwaller-Hürlimann	Zug, Switzerland
Michèle Jäggi	Chelsea Carey (Note: Chelsea Carey spared for Team Jäggi who only had three players.)	Stefanie Berset	Lisa Muhmenthaler		Bern, Switzerland
Marie Kaldvee	Liisa Turmann	Kerli Laidsalu	Heili Grossmann		Tallinn, Estonia
Anna Kubešková	Aneta Müllerová	Klára Svatoňová	Karolína Špundová	Michaela Baudyšová	Prague, Czech Republic
Robyn Munro	Lisa Davie	Holly Wilkie-Milne	Laura Watt		Stirling, Scotland
Kristin Skaslien (Fourth)	Marianne Rørvik (Skip)	Mille Haslev Nordbye	Martine Rønning		Lillehammer, Norway
Xenia Schwaller	Selina Gafner	Fabienne Rieder	Selina Rychiger	Marion Wüest	Zurich, Switzerland
Isabella Wranå	Almida de Val	Maria Larsson	Linda Stenlund		Sundbyberg, Sweden

=== Round robin standings ===
Final Round Robin Standings

Key
Teams to Playoffs

Pool A	W	L	PF	PA	DSC
(Sweden) Isabella Wranå	4	0	26	10	72.00
(Scotland) Fay Henderson	3	1	22	18	114.00
(Denmark) Madeleine Dupont	2	2	25	23	29.00
(Czech Republic) Anna Kubešková	1	3	15	22	153.00
(Norway) Torild Bjørnstad	0	4	11	26	130.00

Pool B	W	L	PF	PA	DSC
(Sweden) Anna Hasselborg	4	0	30	17	102.00
(Switzerland) Corrie Hürlimann	3	1	25	23	39.00
(Switzerland) Michèle Jäggi	2	2	21	17	132.00
(Estonia) Marie Kaldvee	1	3	18	26	209.00
(Scotland) Lucy Blair	0	4	19	30	334.00

Pool C	W	L	PF	PA	DSC
(Norway) Marianne Rørvik	4	0	27	13	59.00
(Sweden) Moa Dryburgh	3	1	20	22	40.00
(Switzerland) Xenia Schwaller	1	3	19	24	27.00
(Scotland) Robyn Munro	1	3	19	23	76.00
(Italy) Stefania Constantini	1	3	21	24	133.00

=== Round robin results ===
All draw times are listed in Central European Summer Time (UTC+02:00).

==== Draw 1 ====
Thursday, August 31, 3:00 pm

Sheet A	1	2	3	4	5	6	7	8	Final
(Scotland) Lucy Blair	0	1	1	0	2	0	2	X	6
(Sweden) Anna Hasselborg	4	0	0	2	0	2	0	X	8

==== Draw 2 ====
Thursday, August 31, 5:45 pm

Sheet C	1	2	3	4	5	6	7	8	Final
(Norway) Torild Bjørnstad	0	0	2	1	0	0	0	X	3
(Denmark) Madeleine Dupont	1	1	0	0	2	3	1	X	8

Sheet D	1	2	3	4	5	6	7	8	Final
(Italy) Stefania Constantini	0	0	3	0	1	1	0	0	5
(Sweden) Moa Dryburgh	1	2	0	2	0	0	0	1	6

==== Draw 3 ====
Thursday, August 31, 9:00 pm

Sheet B	1	2	3	4	5	6	7	8	Final
(Scotland) Fay Henderson	0	0	0	1	0	1	X	X	2
(Sweden) Isabella Wranå	3	1	1	0	1	0	X	X	6

Sheet C	1	2	3	4	5	6	7	8	Final
(Switzerland) Corrie Hürlimann	0	2	0	1	0	1	1	X	5
(Switzerland) Michèle Jäggi	0	0	1	0	2	0	0	X	3

Sheet D	1	2	3	4	5	6	7	8	Final
(Scotland) Robyn Munro	0	1	0	0	2	0	1	X	4
(Norway) Marianne Rørvik	1	0	5	0	0	1	0	X	7

==== Draw 4 ====
Friday, September 1, 8:00 am

Sheet A	1	2	3	4	5	6	7	8	9	Final
(Denmark) Madeleine Dupont	1	0	1	0	2	0	1	0	1	6
(Czech Republic) Anna Kubešková	0	1	0	1	0	2	0	1	0	5

Sheet B	1	2	3	4	5	6	7	8	Final
(Sweden) Anna Hasselborg	3	0	0	0	2	0	2	X	7
(Estonia) Marie Kaldvee	0	0	2	0	0	1	0	X	3

Sheet C	1	2	3	4	5	6	7	8	Final
(Sweden) Moa Dryburgh	0	0	0	2	1	0	0	2	5
(Switzerland) Xenia Schwaller	0	2	0	0	0	1	1	0	4

==== Draw 6 ====
Friday, September 1, 11:00 am

Sheet A	1	2	3	4	5	6	7	8	Final
(Switzerland) Corrie Hürlimann	1	1	0	1	2	1	1	X	7
(Scotland) Lucy Blair	0	0	5	0	0	0	0	X	5

Sheet B	1	2	3	4	5	6	7	8	Final
(Scotland) Robyn Munro	1	0	0	1	0	1	1	X	4
(Italy) Stefania Constantini	0	2	2	0	3	0	0	X	7

==== Draw 7 ====
Friday, September 1, 11:30 am

Sheet F	1	2	3	4	5	6	7	8	Final
(Scotland) Fay Henderson	2	1	0	0	3	X	X	X	6
(Norway) Torild Bjørnstad	0	0	0	2	0	X	X	X	2

==== Draw 8 ====
Friday, September 1, 2:30 pm

Sheet D	1	2	3	4	5	6	7	8	Final
(Czech Republic) Anna Kubešková	0	0	0	0	0	1	X	X	1
(Sweden) Isabella Wranå	0	4	1	1	1	0	X	X	7

==== Draw 9 ====
Friday, September 1, 3:00 pm

Sheet E	1	2	3	4	5	6	7	8	Final
(Estonia) Marie Kaldvee	0	1	0	0	2	0	X	X	3
(Switzerland) Michèle Jäggi	3	0	1	1	0	1	X	X	6

Sheet F	1	2	3	4	5	6	7	8	Final
(Switzerland) Xenia Schwaller	1	1	0	1	0	0	1	X	4
(Norway) Marianne Rørvik	0	0	1	0	4	1	0	X	6

==== Draw 10 ====
Friday, September 1, 5:30 pm

Sheet A	1	2	3	4	5	6	7	8	Final
(Sweden) Moa Dryburgh	0	0	2	0	0	3	0	1	6
(Scotland) Robyn Munro	2	1	0	0	1	0	1	0	5

==== Draw 11 ====
Friday, September 1, 6:00 pm

Sheet E	1	2	3	4	5	6	7	8	9	Final
(Denmark) Madeleine Dupont	3	0	1	0	1	0	0	2	0	7
(Scotland) Fay Henderson	0	1	0	4	0	1	1	0	1	8

Sheet F	1	2	3	4	5	6	7	8	Final
(Sweden) Anna Hasselborg	0	0	3	2	0	0	2	2	9
(Switzerland) Corrie Hürlimann	0	3	0	0	0	2	0	0	5

==== Draw 12 ====
Friday, September 1, 9:00 pm

Sheet B	1	2	3	4	5	6	7	8	Final
(Norway) Torild Bjørnstad	0	1	0	2	0	0	0	X	3
(Czech Republic) Anna Kubešková	1	0	2	0	0	2	1	X	6

Sheet C	1	2	3	4	5	6	7	8	9	Final
(Italy) Stefania Constantini	0	2	0	2	0	1	0	2	0	7
(Switzerland) Xenia Schwaller	2	0	2	0	2	0	1	0	1	8

Sheet D	1	2	3	4	5	6	7	8	Final
(Scotland) Lucy Blair	0	0	1	0	2	1	1	0	5
(Estonia) Marie Kaldvee	0	1	0	4	0	0	0	1	6

==== Draw 14 ====
Saturday, September 2, 8:00 am

Sheet B	1	2	3	4	5	6	7	8	Final
(Sweden) Isabella Wranå	0	2	0	0	0	1	1	3	7
(Denmark) Madeleine Dupont	1	0	1	1	1	0	0	0	4

Sheet C	1	2	3	4	5	6	7	8	Final
(Switzerland) Michèle Jäggi	0	0	0	1	0	1	1	X	3
(Sweden) Anna Hasselborg	0	2	1	0	3	0	0	X	6

Sheet D	1	2	3	4	5	6	7	8	Final
(Norway) Marianne Rørvik	0	2	1	2	2	0	1	X	8
(Sweden) Moa Dryburgh	1	0	0	0	0	2	0	X	3

==== Draw 16 ====
Saturday, September 2, 10:45 am

Sheet A	1	2	3	4	5	6	7	8	Final
(Czech Republic) Anna Kubešková	0	0	1	0	2	0	0	X	3
(Scotland) Fay Henderson	0	3	0	1	0	0	2	X	6

Sheet B	1	2	3	4	5	6	7	8	9	Final
(Estonia) Marie Kaldvee	0	4	0	1	0	0	1	0	0	6
(Switzerland) Corrie Hürlimann	1	0	2	0	1	1	0	1	2	8

Sheet C	1	2	3	4	5	6	7	8	Final
(Switzerland) Xenia Schwaller	0	0	2	0	1	0	0	X	3
(Scotland) Robyn Munro	1	1	0	1	0	0	3	X	6

==== Draw 18 ====
Saturday, September 2, 1:45 pm

Sheet B	1	2	3	4	5	6	7	8	Final
(Norway) Marianne Rørvik	0	0	0	1	0	1	2	2	6
(Italy) Stefania Constantini	1	0	0	0	1	0	0	0	2

Sheet C	1	2	3	4	5	6	7	8	Final
(Sweden) Isabella Wranå	0	1	0	1	0	3	1	X	6
(Norway) Torild Bjørnstad	0	0	2	0	1	0	0	X	3

Sheet D	1	2	3	4	5	6	7	8	Final
(Switzerland) Michèle Jäggi	0	0	1	0	3	0	5	X	9
(Scotland) Lucy Blair	0	1	0	1	0	1	0	X	3

=== Playoffs ===
Quarterfinals
1	(Norway) Marianne Rørvik	6
8	(Switzerland) Michèle Jäggi	2
4	(Switzerland) Corrie Hürlimann	6
5	(Sweden) Moa Dryburgh	5
2	(Sweden) Isabella Wranå	5
7	(Denmark) Madeleine Dupont	2
3	(Sweden) Anna Hasselborg	7
6	(Scotland) Fay Henderson	6

Semifinals
1	(Norway) Marianne Rørvik	5
4	(Switzerland) Corrie Hürlimann	3
2	(Sweden) Isabella Wranå	4
3	(Sweden) Anna Hasselborg	6

Final
1	(Norway) Marianne Rørvik	2
3	(Sweden) Anna Hasselborg	3
Third place
4	(Switzerland) Corrie Hürlimann	1
2	(Sweden) Isabella Wranå	9

==== Quarterfinals ====
Saturday, September 2, 5:30 pm

Sheet A	1	2	3	4	5	6	7	8	Final
(Switzerland) Corrie Hürlimann	1	0	2	0	0	1	2	0	6
(Sweden) Moa Dryburgh	0	2	0	1	0	0	0	2	5

Sheet B	1	2	3	4	5	6	7	8	Final
(Sweden) Anna Hasselborg	2	1	2	0	0	1	0	1	7
(Scotland) Fay Henderson	0	0	0	3	1	0	2	0	6

Sheet C	1	2	3	4	5	6	7	8	Final
(Norway) Marianne Rørvik	0	2	0	1	0	1	2	X	6
(Switzerland) Michèle Jäggi	0	0	1	0	1	0	0	X	2

Sheet D	1	2	3	4	5	6	7	8	Final
(Sweden) Isabella Wranå	0	0	2	0	2	0	1	X	5
(Denmark) Madeleine Dupont	0	1	0	0	0	1	0	X	2

==== Semifinals ====
Sunday, September 3, 9:00 am

Sheet E	1	2	3	4	5	6	7	8	Final
(Norway) Marianne Rørvik	0	2	0	1	0	0	1	1	5
(Switzerland) Corrie Hürlimann	0	0	1	0	1	1	0	0	3

Sheet F	1	2	3	4	5	6	7	8	9	Final
(Sweden) Isabella Wranå	0	1	0	0	0	2	0	1	0	4
(Sweden) Anna Hasselborg	0	0	2	1	0	0	1	0	2	6

==== Third place game ====
Sunday, September 3, 12:30 pm

Sheet D	1	2	3	4	5	6	7	8	Final
(Switzerland) Corrie Hürlimann	0	0	1	0	0	X	X	X	1
(Sweden) Isabella Wranå	0	1	0	4	4	X	X	X	9

==== Final ====
Sunday, September 3, 12:30 pm

Sheet B	1	2	3	4	5	6	7	8	Final
(Norway) Marianne Rørvik	0	0	1	0	1	0	0	0	2
(Sweden) Anna Hasselborg	0	0	0	0	0	2	0	1	3
