= 2022 Oslo Cup =

- Host city: Oslo, Norway
- Arena: Snarøya Curling Club
- Dates: September 2–4
- Men's winner: (Sweden) Team Edin
- Curling club: Karlstads CK, Karlstad
- Skip: Niklas Edin
- Third: Oskar Eriksson
- Second: Rasmus Wranå
- Lead: Christoffer Sundgren
- Coach: Fredrik Lindberg
- Finalist: (Norway) Steffen Walstad
- Women's winner: (Sweden) Team Hasselborg
- Curling club: Sundbybergs CK, Sundbyberg
- Skip: Anna Hasselborg
- Third: Sara McManus
- Second: Agnes Knochenhauer
- Lead: Sofia Mabergs
- Alternate: Johanna Heldin
- Coach: Kristian Lindström
- Finalist: (Canada) Kaitlyn Lawes

The 2022 Oslo Cup was held from September 2 to 4 at the Snarøya Curling Club in Oslo, Norway. The event was held in a round robin format with a purse of NOK 112,000 on the men's side and NOK 88,000 on the women's side. It was the first time the event has been held in ten years.

On the men's side, Niklas Edin and his Swedish rink of Oskar Eriksson, Rasmus Wranå, and Christoffer Sundgren capped off an undefeated tournament by beating Norway's Steffen Walstad 5–2 in the championship final. Both teams finished the round robin with a perfect 4–0 record and each won their quarterfinal and semifinal matches. It was the first event title for Team Edin of the 2022–23 season as they missed the playoffs at the 2022 Baden Masters, which Team Walstad won. In the third place game, Norway's Magnus Ramsfjell scored six in the first end to beat Scotland's James Craik 6–0. Lukas Høstmælingen, Ross Whyte, Kyle Waddell and Cameron Bryce all reached the quarterfinal round.

On the women's side, Sweden's Anna Hasselborg rink with Sara McManus, Agnes Knochenhauer, Sofia Mabergs and Johanna Heldin won 5–3 over Canada's Kaitlyn Lawes in the championship game. Team Hasselborg went 4–1 through the round robin and then beat Swedish rivals Isabella Wranå 8–0 in the semifinal, the team they lost to in the round robin. Team Lawes went a perfect 5–0 in the round robin and then beat Norway's Marianne Rørvik 6–4 in the semifinal. It was the first event for the new team of Lawes, Selena Njegovan, Jocelyn Peterman and Kristin MacCuish which formed following the dissolution of the Jennifer Jones and Tracy Fleury rinks. In the third place game, Team Wranå won 5–2 over Team Rørvik.

== Men ==
=== Teams ===
The teams are listed as follows:

Skip	Third	Second	Lead	Alternate	Locale
Kjetil Bjørke	Tor Fredriksen	Håvard Lundhaug	Johan Lindström		Bygdøy, Norway
Cameron Bryce	Duncan Menzies	Luke Carson	Robin McCall		Stirling, Scotland
James Craik	Mark Watt	Angus Bryce	Blair Haswell		Stirling, Scotland
Niklas Edin	Oskar Eriksson	Rasmus Wranå	Christoffer Sundgren		Karlstad, Sweden
Eskild Eriksen	Haakon Horvli	Hogne Lyngvold	Matias Eggen		Trondheim, Norway
Wouter Gösgens	Jaap van Dorp	Laurens Hoekman	Tobias van den Hurk	Alexander Magan	Zoetermeer, Netherlands
Jacob Bekken (Fourth)	Rune Steen Hansen (Skip)	Vidar Hansen	Trond Erik Standerholen	Tor Egil Strømeng	Hedmarken, Norway
Andreas Hårstad	Michael Mellemseter	Willhelm Næss	Emil M. Kvål		Oppdal, Norway
Grunde Buraas (Fourth)	Lukas Høstmælingen (Skip)	Magnus Lillebø	Tinius Haslev Nordbye		Oslo, Norway
Axel Landelius	Alfons Johansson	Olle Moberg (Note: Olle Moberg is sparing for Johan Engqvist.)	Alexander Palm		Mjölby, Sweden
Johan Nygren	Daniel Berggren	Johan Jaervenson	Victor Martinsson	Sebastian Lundgren	Umeå, Sweden
Fredrik Nyman	Patric Mabergs	Simon Olofsson	Johannes Patz		Sollefteå, Sweden
Eirik Øy	Johan Herfjord	Sondre Elvevold	Martin Bruseth		Oppdal, Norway
Magnus Ramsfjell	Martin Sesaker	Bendik Ramsfjell	Gaute Nepstad		Trondheim, Norway
Albin Eriksson (Fourth)	Vincent Stenberg	Niclas Johansson	Axel Rosander (Skip)	Kristofer Blom	Norrköping, Sweden
Kyle Waddell	Craig Waddell	Mark Taylor	Gavin Barr		Glasgow, Scotland
Steffen Walstad	Magnus Nedregotten	Mathias Brænden	Magnus Vågberg		Oppdal, Norway
Carl-Oscar Pihl (Fourth)	Joel Westerberg (Skip)	Måns Winge	Kim Svedelid		Sundbyberg, Sweden
Ross Whyte	Robin Brydone	Duncan McFadzean	Euan Kyle		Stirling, Scotland
Mats Wranå	Mikael Hasselborg	Anders Eriksson	Gerry Wåhlin		Sundbyberg, Sweden

=== Round-robin standings ===
Final round-robin standings

Key
Teams to Playoffs

Pool A	W	L	PF	PA
(Sweden) Niklas Edin	4	0	37	10
(Norway) Lukas Høstmælingen	3	1	27	15
(Netherlands) Wouter Gösgens	2	2	25	13
(Sweden) Joel Westerberg	1	3	15	31
(Norway) Kjetil Bjørke	0	4	8	43

Pool B	W	L	PF	PA
(Norway) Magnus Ramsfjell	4	0	34	16
(Scotland) Ross Whyte	3	1	21	16
(Sweden) Mats Wranå	2	2	21	24
(Sweden) Johan Nygren	1	3	18	28
(Norway) Eskild Eriksen	0	4	21	31

Pool C	W	L	PF	PA
(Norway) Steffen Walstad	4	0	26	15
(Scotland) Kyle Waddell	3	1	27	12
(Sweden) Axel Rosander	2	2	19	22
(Sweden) Axel Landelius	1	3	26	28
(Norway) Eirik Øy	0	4	15	36

Pool D	W	L	PF	PA
(Scotland) James Craik	4	0	28	12
(Scotland) Cameron Bryce	3	1	26	13
(Sweden) Fredrik Nyman	2	2	23	21
(Norway) Andreas Hårstad	1	3	19	22
(Norway) Rune Steen Hansen	0	4	5	33

=== Round-robin results ===
All draw times are listed in Central European Summer Time (UTC+02:00).

==== Draw 1 ====
Friday, September 2, 8:00 am

Sheet A	1	2	3	4	5	6	7	8	Final
(Norway) Lukas Høstmælingen 🔨	4	1	1	5	0	3	X	X	14
(Norway) Kjetil Bjørke	0	0	0	0	1	0	X	X	1

Sheet B	1	2	3	4	5	6	7	8	Final
(Sweden) Joel Westerberg 🔨	0	1	0	1	0	0	0	X	2
(Netherlands) Wouter Gösgens	1	0	1	0	3	1	3	X	9

Sheet C	1	2	3	4	5	6	7	8	Final
(Norway) Magnus Ramsfjell 🔨	0	4	0	0	3	1	2	2	12
(Norway) Eskild Eriksen	2	0	3	3	0	0	0	0	8

Sheet D	1	2	3	4	5	6	7	8	Final
(Sweden) Mats Wranå 🔨	0	1	2	0	2	0	0	3	8
(Sweden) Johan Nygren	1	0	0	2	0	2	0	0	5

Sheet E	1	2	3	4	5	6	7	8	Final
(Sweden) Axel Rosander 🔨	3	0	2	0	0	0	1	1	7
(Norway) Eirik Øy	0	3	0	3	0	0	0	0	6

Sheet F	1	2	3	4	5	6	7	8	9	Final
(Norway) Steffen Walstad 🔨	2	1	0	0	1	0	1	0	1	6
(Sweden) Axel Landelius	0	0	3	0	0	0	0	2	0	5

==== Draw 2 ====
Friday, September 2, 10:30 am

Sheet A	1	2	3	4	5	6	7	8	Final
(Scotland) James Craik	0	4	3	0	3	X	X	X	10
(Norway) Rune Steen Hansen 🔨	0	0	0	1	0	X	X	X	1

Sheet B	1	2	3	4	5	6	7	8	Final
(Norway) Andreas Hårstad	0	0	0	0	1	0	0	X	1
(Scotland) Cameron Bryce 🔨	0	0	0	3	0	3	1	X	7

==== Draw 3 ====
Friday, September 2, 1:15 pm

Sheet C	1	2	3	4	5	6	7	8	Final
(Norway) Kjetil Bjørke	0	0	1	0	2	0	1	X	4
(Sweden) Joel Westerberg 🔨	2	0	0	2	0	2	0	X	6

Sheet D	1	2	3	4	5	6	7	8	Final
(Sweden) Niklas Edin	1	1	0	2	2	2	X	X	8
(Norway) Lukas Høstmælingen 🔨	0	0	1	0	0	0	X	X	1

Sheet E	1	2	3	4	5	6	7	8	Final
(Norway) Eskild Eriksen	0	1	0	1	0	2	0	X	4
(Sweden) Mats Wranå 🔨	3	0	2	0	1	0	2	X	8

Sheet F	1	2	3	4	5	6	7	8	Final
(Scotland) Ross Whyte	0	1	0	0	0	X	X	X	1
(Norway) Magnus Ramsfjell 🔨	1	0	1	3	2	X	X	X	7

==== Draw 4 ====
Friday, September 2, 3:45 pm

Sheet A	1	2	3	4	5	6	7	8	Final
(Norway) Eirik Øy	0	0	0	1	X	X	X	X	1
(Norway) Steffen Walstad 🔨	0	4	3	0	X	X	X	X	7

Sheet B	1	2	3	4	5	6	7	8	Final
(Scotland) Kyle Waddell 🔨	0	1	0	0	1	0	2	X	4
(Sweden) Axel Rosander	0	0	0	1	0	1	0	X	2

Sheet C	1	2	3	4	5	6	7	8	Final
(Norway) Rune Steen Hansen	0	0	0	0	1	0	0	X	1
(Norway) Andreas Hårstad 🔨	0	2	0	2	0	2	2	X	8

Sheet D	1	2	3	4	5	6	7	8	Final
(Sweden) Fredrik Nyman 🔨	1	0	1	0	1	0	1	0	4
(Scotland) James Craik	0	0	0	0	0	4	0	2	6

==== Draw 5 ====
Friday, September 2, 6:45 pm

Sheet E	1	2	3	4	5	6	7	8	Final
(Sweden) Joel Westerberg	0	1	0	1	0	2	0	X	4
(Sweden) Niklas Edin 🔨	2	0	3	0	3	0	2	X	10

Sheet F	1	2	3	4	5	6	7	8	Final
(Netherlands) Wouter Gösgens 🔨	5	0	1	3	0	0	X	X	9
(Norway) Kjetil Bjørke	0	1	0	0	0	1	X	X	2

==== Draw 6 ====
Friday, September 2, 9:00 pm

Sheet A	1	2	3	4	5	6	7	8	Final
(Sweden) Mats Wranå	0	0	2	0	0	X	X	X	2
(Scotland) Ross Whyte 🔨	1	1	0	3	2	X	X	X	7

Sheet B	1	2	3	4	5	6	7	8	Final
(Sweden) Johan Nygren	0	0	1	1	1	0	1	2	6
(Norway) Eskild Eriksen 🔨	0	1	0	0	0	4	0	0	5

Sheet C	1	2	3	4	5	6	7	8	Final
(Norway) Steffen Walstad 🔨	1	0	3	1	0	1	0	1	7
(Scotland) Kyle Waddell	0	1	0	0	2	0	3	0	6

Sheet D	1	2	3	4	5	6	7	8	Final
(Sweden) Axel Landelius 🔨	1	0	3	0	0	2	4	2	12
(Norway) Eirik Øy	0	5	0	2	1	0	0	0	8

Sheet E	1	2	3	4	5	6	7	8	Final
(Norway) Andreas Hårstad	0	0	0	1	0	4	0	X	5
(Sweden) Fredrik Nyman 🔨	0	2	1	0	2	0	3	X	8

Sheet F	1	2	3	4	5	6	7	8	Final
(Scotland) Cameron Bryce 🔨	1	0	3	1	0	3	X	X	8
(Norway) Rune Steen Hansen	0	1	0	0	1	0	X	X	2

==== Draw 8 ====
Saturday, September 3, 10:00 am

Sheet A	1	2	3	4	5	6	7	8	Final
(Sweden) Niklas Edin 🔨	1	0	2	1	1	0	0	X	5
(Netherlands) Wouter Gösgens	0	3	0	0	0	0	1	X	4

Sheet B	1	2	3	4	5	6	7	8	Final
(Norway) Lukas Høstmælingen 🔨	2	0	2	2	0	0	2	X	8
(Sweden) Joel Westerberg	0	0	0	0	2	1	0	X	3

Sheet C	1	2	3	4	5	6	7	8	Final
(Scotland) Ross Whyte 🔨	3	0	0	1	0	2	2	X	8
(Sweden) Johan Nygren	0	2	0	0	1	0	0	X	3

Sheet D	1	2	3	4	5	6	7	8	Final
(Norway) Magnus Ramsfjell 🔨	2	1	1	0	1	0	3	X	8
(Sweden) Mats Wranå	0	0	0	2	0	1	0	X	3

Sheet E	1	2	3	4	5	6	7	8	Final
(Scotland) Kyle Waddell 🔨	0	0	3	0	0	1	3	X	7
(Sweden) Axel Landelius	0	1	0	1	1	0	0	X	3

Sheet F	1	2	3	4	5	6	7	8	Final
(Sweden) Axel Rosander 🔨	1	0	1	0	1	0	0	X	3
(Norway) Steffen Walstad	0	2	0	1	0	1	2	X	6

==== Draw 9 ====
Saturday, September 3, 12:45 pm

Sheet A	1	2	3	4	5	6	7	8	Final
(Sweden) Fredrik Nyman	0	1	0	2	0	1	0	0	4
(Scotland) Cameron Bryce 🔨	1	0	2	0	2	0	1	3	9

Sheet B	1	2	3	4	5	6	7	8	Final
(Scotland) James Craik	0	2	0	1	0	2	0	1	6
(Norway) Andreas Hårstad 🔨	1	0	1	0	1	0	2	0	5

==== Draw 10 ====
Saturday, September 3, 3:15 pm

Sheet A	1	2	3	4	5	6	7	8	Final
(Sweden) Axel Landelius	0	0	1	1	1	2	1	0	6
(Sweden) Axel Rosander 🔨	2	4	0	0	0	0	0	1	7

Sheet B	1	2	3	4	5	6	7	8	Final
(Norway) Eirik Øy	0	0	X	X	X	X	X	X	0
(Scotland) Kyle Waddell 🔨	5	5	X	X	X	X	X	X	10

Sheet C	1	2	3	4	5	6	7	8	Final
(Norway) Eskild Eriksen	0	2	0	0	1	0	1	X	4
(Scotland) Ross Whyte 🔨	3	0	1	0	0	1	0	X	5

Sheet D	1	2	3	4	5	6	7	8	Final
(Sweden) Johan Nygren	2	0	1	0	0	1	0	0	4
(Norway) Magnus Ramsfjell 🔨	0	3	0	1	0	0	2	1	7

==== Draw 11 ====
Saturday, September 3, 5:45 pm

Sheet B	1	2	3	4	5	6	7	8	9	Final
(Netherlands) Wouter Gösgens	0	0	1	0	1	0	0	1	0	3
(Norway) Lukas Høstmælingen 🔨	1	1	0	0	0	0	1	0	1	4

Sheet C	1	2	3	4	5	6	7	8	Final
(Norway) Kjetil Bjørke	0	0	1	0	0	0	X	X	1
(Sweden) Niklas Edin 🔨	4	2	0	4	2	2	X	X	14

Sheet D	1	2	3	4	5	6	7	8	Final
(Scotland) Cameron Bryce	0	0	2	0	0	0	X	X	2
(Scotland) James Craik 🔨	1	1	0	2	0	2	X	X	6

Sheet F	1	2	3	4	5	6	7	8	Final
(Norway) Rune Steen Hansen	0	0	0	1	X	X	X	X	1
(Sweden) Fredrik Nyman 🔨	3	1	3	0	X	X	X	X	7

=== Playoffs ===
Quarterfinals
1	(Norway) Steffen Walstad	7
8	(Scotland) Cameron Bryce	4
4	(Scotland) James Craik	7
5	(Scotland) Kyle Waddell	6
2	(Norway) Magnus Ramsfjell	5
7	(Scotland) Ross Whyte	4
3	(Sweden) Niklas Edin	10
6	(Norway) Lukas Høstmælingen	3

Semifinals
1	(Norway) Steffen Walstad	8
4	(Scotland) James Craik	4
2	(Norway) Magnus Ramsfjell	4
3	(Sweden) Niklas Edin	6

Final
1	(Norway) Steffen Walstad	2
3	(Sweden) Niklas Edin	5
Third place
4	(Scotland) James Craik	0
2	(Norway) Magnus Ramsfjell	6

==== Quarterfinals ====
Sunday, September 4, 10:00 am

Sheet A	1	2	3	4	5	6	7	8	Final
(Norway) Magnus Ramsfjell 🔨	1	0	0	0	2	0	2	0	5
(Scotland) Ross Whyte	0	0	0	0	0	2	0	2	4

Sheet B	1	2	3	4	5	6	7	8	Final
(Norway) Steffen Walstad 🔨	0	2	0	3	0	1	0	1	7
(Scotland) Cameron Bryce	0	0	1	0	2	0	1	0	4

Sheet C	1	2	3	4	5	6	7	8	Final
(Scotland) James Craik 🔨	0	2	0	2	0	1	0	2	7
(Scotland) Kyle Waddell	1	0	2	0	1	0	2	0	6

Sheet D	1	2	3	4	5	6	7	8	Final
(Sweden) Niklas Edin 🔨	2	3	1	0	3	1	X	X	10
(Norway) Lukas Høstmælingen	0	0	0	3	0	0	X	X	3

==== Semifinals ====
Sunday, September 4, 12:15 pm

Sheet A	1	2	3	4	5	6	7	8	Final
(Norway) Steffen Walstad 🔨	0	1	1	0	0	3	0	3	8
(Scotland) James Craik	0	0	0	2	1	0	1	0	4

Sheet B	1	2	3	4	5	6	7	8	Final
(Norway) Magnus Ramsfjell 🔨	1	0	1	0	1	0	1	0	4
(Sweden) Niklas Edin	0	2	0	2	0	1	0	1	6

==== Third place game ====
Sunday, September 4, 2:45 pm

Sheet A	1	2	3	4	5	6	7	8	Final
(Scotland) James Craik	0	X	X	X	X	X	X	X	0
(Norway) Magnus Ramsfjell 🔨	6	X	X	X	X	X	X	X	6

==== Final ====
Sunday, September 4, 2:45 pm

Sheet C	1	2	3	4	5	6	7	8	Final
(Norway) Steffen Walstad 🔨	1	0	0	1	0	0	0	X	2
(Sweden) Niklas Edin	0	1	1	0	0	0	3	X	5

== Women ==
=== Teams ===
The teams are listed as follows:

Skip	Third	Second	Lead	Alternate	Locale
Stefania Constantini	Marta Lo Deserto	Angela Romei	Giulia Zardini Lacedelli		Cortina d'Ampezzo, Italy
Beth Farmer	Hailey Duff	Kirstin Bousie	Katie McMillan	Amy MacDonald	Stirling, Scotland
Anna Hasselborg	Sara McManus	Agnes Knochenhauer	Sofia Mabergs	Johanna Heldin	Sundbyberg, Sweden
Michèle Jäggi	Irene Schori	Stefanie Berset	Sarah Müller	Lara Stocker	Bern, Switzerland
Marie Kaldvee	Liisa Turmann	Kerli Laidsalu	Erika Tuvike		Tallinn, Estonia
Selina Witschonke (Fourth)	Elena Mathis	Raphaela Keiser (Skip)	Marina Lörtscher		St. Moritz, Switzerland
Kaitlyn Lawes	Selena Njegovan	Jocelyn Peterman	Kristin MacCuish		Winnipeg, Manitoba, Canada
Eirin Mesloe	Torild Bjørnstad	Nora Østgård	Ingeborg Forbregd		Oppdal, Norway
Rebecca Morrison	Gina Aitken	Sophie Sinclair	Sophie Jackson		Stirling, Scotland
Maia Ramsfjell	Mili Smith	Pia Trulsen	Leeanne McKenzie		Lillehammer, Norway
Kristin Skaslien (Fourth)	Marianne Rørvik (Skip)	Mille Haslev Nordbye	Martine Rønning		Oslo, Norway
Isabella Wranå	Almida de Val	Linda Stenlund	Maria Larsson	Jennie Wåhlin	Sundbyberg, Sweden

=== Round-robin standings ===
Final round-robin standings

Key
Teams to Playoffs

Pool A	W	L	PF	PA
(Sweden) Anna Hasselborg	4	1	33	16
(Sweden) Isabella Wranå	4	1	29	27
(Norway) Eirin Mesloe	3	2	26	30
(Switzerland) Michèle Jäggi	2	3	28	24
(Scotland) Rebecca Morrison	2	3	25	26
(Estonia) Marie Kaldvee	0	5	18	36

Pool B	W	L	PF	PA
(Canada) Kaitlyn Lawes	5	0	32	16
(Norway) Marianne Rørvik	4	1	28	20
(Italy) Stefania Constantini	3	2	25	20
(Switzerland) Raphaela Keiser	2	3	26	24
(Norway) Maia Ramsfjell	1	4	22	36
(Scotland) Beth Farmer	0	5	19	36

=== Round-robin results ===
All draw times are listed in Central European Summer Time (UTC+02:00).

==== Draw 2 ====
Friday, September 2, 10:30 am

Sheet C	1	2	3	4	5	6	7	8	Final
(Norway) Eirin Mesloe	0	0	0	0	2	0	X	X	2
(Sweden) Anna Hasselborg 🔨	0	2	1	3	0	2	X	X	8

Sheet D	1	2	3	4	5	6	7	8	Final
(Sweden) Isabella Wranå 🔨	1	1	0	0	1	0	0	1	4
(Scotland) Rebecca Morrison	0	0	1	1	0	1	0	0	3

Sheet E	1	2	3	4	5	6	7	8	Final
(Switzerland) Michèle Jäggi	0	2	1	3	2	X	X	X	8
(Estonia) Marie Kaldvee 🔨	1	0	0	0	0	X	X	X	1

Sheet F	1	2	3	4	5	6	7	8	Final
(Italy) Stefania Constantini	0	1	3	0	0	3	3	X	10
(Norway) Maia Ramsfjell 🔨	1	0	0	1	1	0	0	X	3

==== Draw 3 ====
Friday, September 2, 1:15 pm

Sheet A	1	2	3	4	5	6	7	8	Final
(Canada) Kaitlyn Lawes 🔨	5	0	1	4	0	X	X	X	10
(Scotland) Beth Farmer	0	1	0	0	1	X	X	X	2

Sheet B	1	2	3	4	5	6	7	8	Final
(Switzerland) Raphaela Keiser 🔨	0	0	1	0	1	0	2	0	4
(Norway) Marianne Rørvik	0	0	0	1	0	3	0	1	5

==== Draw 4 ====
Friday, September 2, 3:45 pm

Sheet E	1	2	3	4	5	6	7	8	Final
(Sweden) Anna Hasselborg 🔨	2	0	0	0	3	0	1	0	6
(Sweden) Isabella Wranå	0	0	3	1	0	2	0	1	7

Sheet F	1	2	3	4	5	6	7	8	Final
(Estonia) Marie Kaldvee 🔨	2	0	2	0	0	0	0	0	4
(Norway) Eirin Mesloe	0	1	0	1	1	1	1	1	6

==== Draw 5 ====
Friday, September 2, 6:45 pm

Sheet A	1	2	3	4	5	6	7	8	Final
(Scotland) Rebecca Morrison	0	0	0	1	0	2	1	1	5
(Switzerland) Michèle Jäggi 🔨	0	1	0	0	2	0	0	0	3

Sheet B	1	2	3	4	5	6	7	8	Final
(Norway) Maia Ramsfjell	0	2	0	0	1	0	1	X	4
(Canada) Kaitlyn Lawes 🔨	2	0	0	3	0	2	0	X	7

Sheet C	1	2	3	4	5	6	7	8	Final
(Norway) Marianne Rørvik 🔨	0	0	1	2	0	1	0	X	4
(Italy) Stefania Constantini	0	0	0	0	0	0	1	X	1

Sheet D	1	2	3	4	5	6	7	8	Final
(Scotland) Beth Farmer	0	0	0	2	0	1	0	1	4
(Switzerland) Raphaela Keiser 🔨	2	1	0	0	1	0	1	0	5

==== Draw 7 ====
Saturday, September 3, 7:30 am

Sheet A	1	2	3	4	5	6	7	8	Final
(Norway) Eirin Mesloe	0	2	0	1	0	0	X	X	3
(Sweden) Isabella Wranå 🔨	4	0	1	0	2	1	X	X	8

Sheet B	1	2	3	4	5	6	7	8	Final
(Switzerland) Michèle Jäggi	1	0	1	0	0	1	0	X	3
(Sweden) Anna Hasselborg 🔨	0	2	0	2	1	0	2	X	7

Sheet C	1	2	3	4	5	6	7	8	9	Final
(Estonia) Marie Kaldvee	1	1	0	1	0	2	0	1	0	6
(Scotland) Rebecca Morrison 🔨	0	0	2	0	2	0	2	0	3	9

Sheet D	1	2	3	4	5	6	7	8	Final
(Italy) Stefania Constantini	0	0	0	1	0	0	2	X	3
(Canada) Kaitlyn Lawes 🔨	0	2	1	0	1	1	0	X	5

Sheet E	1	2	3	4	5	6	7	8	Final
(Switzerland) Raphaela Keiser	0	1	0	3	0	2	1	3	10
(Norway) Maia Ramsfjell 🔨	1	0	2	0	1	0	0	0	4

Sheet F	1	2	3	4	5	6	7	8	Final
(Norway) Marianne Rørvik	0	0	0	3	4	0	1	1	9
(Scotland) Beth Farmer 🔨	1	3	0	0	0	2	0	0	6

==== Draw 9 ====
Saturday, September 3, 12:45 pm

Sheet C	1	2	3	4	5	6	7	8	Final
(Sweden) Isabella Wranå	0	1	0	0	3	0	X	X	4
(Switzerland) Michèle Jäggi 🔨	3	0	4	1	0	2	X	X	10

Sheet D	1	2	3	4	5	6	7	8	Final
(Sweden) Anna Hasselborg 🔨	2	1	0	3	1	0	X	X	7
(Estonia) Marie Kaldvee	0	0	1	0	0	1	X	X	2

Sheet E	1	2	3	4	5	6	7	8	Final
(Canada) Kaitlyn Lawes 🔨	2	0	2	0	0	1	0	1	6
(Switzerland) Raphaela Keiser	0	1	0	2	0	0	1	0	4

Sheet F	1	2	3	4	5	6	7	8	9	Final
(Scotland) Beth Farmer 🔨	1	1	0	1	1	0	0	1	0	5
(Italy) Stefania Constantini	0	0	2	0	0	1	2	0	1	6

==== Draw 10 ====
Saturday, September 3, 3:15 pm

Sheet E	1	2	3	4	5	6	7	8	Final
(Norway) Maia Ramsfjell 🔨	0	2	0	0	1	1	1	0	5
(Norway) Marianne Rørvik	0	0	2	2	0	0	0	3	7

Sheet F	1	2	3	4	5	6	7	8	Final
(Scotland) Rebecca Morrison 🔨	2	1	0	2	0	1	0	0	6
(Norway) Eirin Mesloe	0	0	0	0	3	0	3	2	8

==== Draw 12 ====
Sunday, September 4, 7:45 am

Sheet A	1	2	3	4	5	6	7	8	Final
(Estonia) Marie Kaldvee	0	1	0	2	1	0	1	0	5
(Sweden) Isabella Wranå 🔨	1	0	1	0	0	2	0	2	6

Sheet B	1	2	3	4	5	6	7	8	Final
(Norway) Eirin Mesloe	0	0	1	1	1	1	0	3	7
(Switzerland) Michèle Jäggi 🔨	2	1	0	0	0	0	1	0	4

Sheet C	1	2	3	4	5	6	7	8	Final
(Norway) Marianne Rørvik	0	0	1	1	0	1	0	0	3
(Canada) Kaitlyn Lawes 🔨	1	0	0	0	1	0	1	1	4

Sheet D	1	2	3	4	5	6	7	8	Final
(Scotland) Rebecca Morrison	0	1	0	0	0	1	0	X	2
(Sweden) Anna Hasselborg 🔨	0	0	1	1	1	0	2	X	5

Sheet E	1	2	3	4	5	6	7	8	Final
(Italy) Stefania Constantini	1	1	0	0	2	0	1	0	5
(Switzerland) Raphaela Keiser 🔨	0	0	0	1	0	1	0	1	3

Sheet F	1	2	3	4	5	6	7	8	Final
(Scotland) Beth Farmer	1	0	1	0	0	0	0	0	2
(Norway) Maia Ramsfjell 🔨	0	1	0	1	0	1	1	2	6

=== Playoffs ===
Semifinals
1	(Canada) Kaitlyn Lawes	6
4	(Norway) Marianne Rørvik	4
2	(Sweden) Anna Hasselborg	8
3	(Sweden) Isabella Wranå	0

Final
1	(Canada) Kaitlyn Lawes	3
2	(Sweden) Anna Hasselborg	5

Third place game
4	(Norway) Marianne Rørvik	2
3	(Sweden) Isabella Wranå	6

==== Semifinals ====
Sunday, September 4, 12:15 pm

Sheet C	1	2	3	4	5	6	7	8	Final
(Canada) Kaitlyn Lawes 🔨	1	0	0	2	0	0	2	1	6
(Norway) Marianne Rørvik	0	1	2	0	0	1	0	0	4

Sheet D	1	2	3	4	5	6	7	8	Final
(Sweden) Anna Hasselborg 🔨	3	3	2	X	X	X	X	X	8
(Sweden) Isabella Wranå	0	0	0	X	X	X	X	X	0

==== Third place game ====
Sunday, September 4, 2:45 pm

Sheet D	1	2	3	4	5	6	7	8	Final
(Norway) Marianne Rørvik	0	0	1	0	0	1	X	X	2
(Sweden) Isabella Wranå 🔨	0	2	0	3	1	0	X	X	6

==== Final ====
Sunday, September 4, 2:45 pm

Sheet B	1	2	3	4	5	6	7	8	Final
(Canada) Kaitlyn Lawes 🔨	1	0	0	0	2	0	0	0	3
(Sweden) Anna Hasselborg	0	0	0	1	0	3	0	1	5
