= 2023 Baden Masters =

World Curling Tour event

- Host city: Baden, Switzerland
- Arena: Curling Club Baden Regio
- Dates: August 17–20
- Winner: (Italy) Team Retornaz
- Curling club: Trentino Curling, Cembra
- Skip: Joël Retornaz
- Third: Amos Mosaner
- Second: Sebastiano Arman
- Lead: Mattia Giovanella
- Finalist: (Scotland) Cameron Bryce

The 2023 Baden Masters was held from August 17 to 20 at the Curling Club Baden Regio in Baden, Switzerland as part of the World Curling Tour. The event was held in a round-robin format with a purse of 35,000 CHF. It was the first men's event of the 2023–24 World Curling Tour. The event category for the event was 500.

== Teams ==
The teams are listed as follows:

Skip	Third	Second	Lead	Alternate	Locale
Sixten Totzek (Fourth)	Steffen Walstad	Alexander Baumann (Skip)	Johannes Patz		Germany / Norway / Sweden
Lars Brauchli	Leon Wittich	Livio Ernst	Felix Lüthold	Jonas Feierabend	Wildhaus, Switzerland
Michael Brunner	Anthony Petoud	Romano Meier	Andreas Gerlach		Bern, Switzerland
Cameron Bryce	Duncan Menzies	Luke Carson	Robin McCall		Border, Scotland
James Craik	Mark Watt	Angus Bryce	Blair Haswell		Forfar, Scotland
Korey Dropkin (Fourth)	Andrew Stopera (Skip)	Mark Fenner	– (Note: Team Dropkin played with three players.)		(United States) Duluth, Minnesota
Wouter Gösgens	Laurens Hoekman	Jaap van Dorp	Tobias van den Hurk	Alexander Magan	Zoetermeer, Netherlands
Marco Hösli	Philipp Hösli	Simon Gloor	Justin Hausherr		Glarus, Switzerland
Lukas Høstmælingen	Grunde Buraas	Magnus Lillebø	Tinius Haslev Nordbye		Oslo, Norway
Jan Iseli	Max Winz	Matthieu Fague	Sandro Fanchini		Solothurn, Switzerland
Manuel Jermann	Yannick Jermann	Kenjo von Allmen	Simon Hanhart		Arlesheim, Switzerland
Benny Kapp	Felix Messenzehl	Johannes Scheuerl	Mario Trevisol	Marc Muskatewitz	Füssen, Germany
Lukáš Klíma	Marek Černovský	Martin Jurík	Lukáš Klípa	Radek Boháč	Prague, Czech Republic
Magnus Ramsfjell	Martin Sesaker	Bendik Ramsfjell	Gaute Nepstad		Trondheim, Norway
Joël Retornaz	Amos Mosaner	Sebastiano Arman	Mattia Giovanella		Trentino, Italy
Andrin Schnider	Dean Hürlimann	Marco Hefti	Nicola Stoll		Schaffhausen, Switzerland
Benoît Schwarz-van Berkel (Fourth)	Yannick Schwaller (Skip)	Sven Michel	Pablo Lachat		Geneva, Switzerland
Yves Stocker	Kim Schwaller	Felix Eberhard	Tom Winkelhausen		Zug, Switzerland
Kyle Waddell	Craig Waddell	Mark Taylor	Gavin Barr		Hamilton, Scotland
Ross Whyte	Robin Brydone	Duncan McFadzean	Euan Kyle		Stirling, Scotland

== Round robin standings ==
Final Round Robin Standings

Key
Teams to Playoffs

Pool A	W	L	PF	PA
(Scotland) James Craik	3	1	26	23
(Switzerland) Yannick Schwaller	3	1	26	13
(Netherlands) Wouter Gösgens	2	2	22	20
(Switzerland) Manuel Jermann	1	3	16	31
(Czech Republic) Lukáš Klíma	1	3	23	26

Pool B	W	L	PF	PA
(Italy) Joël Retornaz	4	0	34	8
(Scotland) Kyle Waddell	3	1	22	19
(Switzerland) Lars Brauchli	1	3	14	36
(Switzerland) Marco Hösli	1	3	21	19
(Norway) Lukas Høstmælingen	1	3	18	27

Pool C	W	L	PF	PA
(Scotland) Ross Whyte	4	0	29	10
(Norway) Magnus Ramsfjell	3	1	21	15
(Switzerland) Yves Stocker	2	2	20	21
(Switzerland) Jan Iseli	1	3	12	23
(Germany) Benny Kapp	0	4	14	27

Pool D	W	L	PF	PA
(Scotland) Cameron Bryce	4	0	32	12
(Switzerland) Michael Brunner	3	1	25	21
(Germany) Alexander Baumann	2	2	19	22
(United States) Team Dropkin	1	3	18	24
(Switzerland) Andrin Schnider	0	4	15	30

== Round robin results ==
All draw times listed in Central European Time.

=== Draw 1 ===
Thursday, August 17, 5:00 pm

Sheet 1	1	2	3	4	5	6	7	8	Final
(Italy) Joël Retornaz 🔨	5	1	0	0	0	4	X	X	10
(Scotland) Kyle Waddell	0	0	1	0	0	0	X	X	1

Sheet 2	1	2	3	4	5	6	7	8	9	Final
(Netherlands) Wouter Gösgens 🔨	1	0	0	1	0	3	0	1	0	6
(Switzerland) Yannick Schwaller	0	3	0	0	2	0	1	0	2	8

Sheet 3	1	2	3	4	5	6	7	8	9	Final
(Switzerland) Lars Brauchli 🔨	2	5	1	0	0	0	0	0	1	9
(Norway) Lukas Høstmælingen	0	0	0	2	2	0	2	2	0	8

Sheet 4	1	2	3	4	5	6	7	8	Final
(Switzerland) Manuel Jermann 🔨	0	2	1	0	0	4	0	0	7
(Scotland) James Craik	3	0	0	0	2	0	4	2	11

=== Draw 2 ===
Thursday, August 17, 8:30 pm

Sheet 1	1	2	3	4	5	6	7	8	Final
(Germany) Alexander Baumann 🔨	0	0	0	0	0	1	X	X	1
(Switzerland) Michael Brunner	1	0	1	1	3	0	X	X	6

Sheet 2	1	2	3	4	5	6	7	8	Final
(Norway) Magnus Ramsfjell 🔨	1	0	2	1	0	1	0	1	6
(Switzerland) Yves Stocker	0	1	0	0	2	0	2	0	5

Sheet 3	1	2	3	4	5	6	7	8	Final
(Switzerland) Andrin Schnider 🔨	0	0	0	1	1	0	1	X	3
(Scotland) Cameron Bryce	1	1	4	0	0	1	0	X	7

Sheet 4	1	2	3	4	5	6	7	8	Final
(Switzerland) Jan Iseli 🔨	2	0	0	2	0	2	1	X	7
(Germany) Benny Kapp	0	2	1	0	1	0	0	X	4

=== Draw 3 ===
Friday, August 18, 8:00 am

Sheet 1	1	2	3	4	5	6	7	8	Final
(Netherlands) Wouter Gösgens 🔨	0	4	0	0	2	1	X	X	7
(Switzerland) Manuel Jermann	1	0	1	0	0	0	X	X	2

Sheet 2	1	2	3	4	5	6	7	8	Final
(Scotland) Kyle Waddell 🔨	1	1	0	3	0	0	0	X	5
(Switzerland) Marco Hösli	0	0	1	0	1	1	1	X	4

Sheet 3	1	2	3	4	5	6	7	8	Final
(Switzerland) Yannick Schwaller 🔨	0	2	0	2	0	0	3	X	7
(Czech Republic) Lukáš Klíma	0	0	1	0	1	0	0	X	2

Sheet 4	1	2	3	4	5	6	7	8	Final
(Italy) Joël Retornaz 🔨	2	1	1	1	1	3	X	X	9
(Switzerland) Lars Brauchli	0	0	0	0	0	0	X	X	0

=== Draw 4 ===
Friday, August 18, 11:00 am

Sheet 1	1	2	3	4	5	6	7	8	Final
(Norway) Magnus Ramsfjell	0	1	1	2	2	1	X	X	7
(Switzerland) Jan Iseli 🔨	2	0	0	0	0	0	X	X	2

Sheet 2	1	2	3	4	5	6	7	8	9	Final
(Switzerland) Michael Brunner	0	0	1	1	0	2	0	1	3	8
(United States) Team Dropkin 🔨	0	1	0	0	2	0	2	0	0	5

Sheet 3	1	2	3	4	5	6	7	8	Final
(Switzerland) Yves Stocker	0	0	2	0	0	X	X	X	2
(Scotland) Ross Whyte 🔨	0	3	0	2	3	X	X	X	8

Sheet 4	1	2	3	4	5	6	7	8	Final
(Germany) Alexander Baumann 🔨	0	4	0	2	3	X	X	X	9
(Switzerland) Andrin Schnider	1	0	1	0	0	X	X	X	2

=== Draw 5 ===
Friday, August 18, 2:30 pm

Sheet 1	1	2	3	4	5	6	7	8	Final
(Switzerland) Lars Brauchli 🔨	1	0	1	0	1	0	0	X	3
(Scotland) Kyle Waddell	0	3	0	1	0	2	4	X	10

Sheet 2	1	2	3	4	5	6	7	8	9	Final
(Scotland) James Craik	0	1	0	2	1	0	0	3	1	8
(Czech Republic) Lukáš Klíma 🔨	1	0	2	0	0	3	1	0	0	7

Sheet 3	1	2	3	4	5	6	7	8	Final
(Switzerland) Manuel Jermann	0	0	0	0	0	X	X	X	0
(Switzerland) Yannick Schwaller 🔨	2	0	2	1	2	X	X	X	7

Sheet 4	1	2	3	4	5	6	7	8	Final
(Norway) Lukas Høstmælingen 🔨	2	1	0	1	0	2	0	X	6
(Switzerland) Marco Hösli	0	0	1	0	1	0	1	X	3

=== Draw 6 ===
Friday, August 18, 5:30 pm

Sheet 1	1	2	3	4	5	6	7	8	Final
(Switzerland) Andrin Schnider 🔨	0	1	0	1	1	0	3	0	6
(Switzerland) Michael Brunner	2	0	2	0	0	1	0	2	7

Sheet 2	1	2	3	4	5	6	7	8	Final
(Germany) Benny Kapp 🔨	1	0	0	0	2	0	2	0	5
(Scotland) Ross Whyte	0	1	2	1	0	2	0	2	8

Sheet 3	1	2	3	4	5	6	7	8	Final
(Scotland) Cameron Bryce 🔨	2	1	0	3	0	0	X	X	6
(United States) Team Dropkin	0	0	1	0	0	1	X	X	2

Sheet 4	1	2	3	4	5	6	7	8	Final
(Switzerland) Jan Iseli 🔨	0	1	0	1	0	X	X	X	2
(Switzerland) Yves Stocker	0	0	3	0	4	X	X	X	7

=== Draw 7 ===
Friday, August 18, 8:30 pm

Sheet 1	1	2	3	4	5	6	7	8	Final
(Czech Republic) Lukáš Klíma	0	2	0	0	0	2	2	0	6
(Switzerland) Manuel Jermann 🔨	2	0	1	1	1	0	0	2	7

Sheet 2	1	2	3	4	5	6	7	8	Final
(Norway) Lukas Høstmælingen	0	1	0	0	1	X	X	X	2
(Italy) Joël Retornaz 🔨	4	0	1	4	0	X	X	X	9

Sheet 3	1	2	3	4	5	6	7	8	Final
(Switzerland) Marco Hösli	1	1	0	2	5	X	X	X	9
(Switzerland) Lars Brauchli 🔨	0	0	2	0	0	X	X	X	2

Sheet 4	1	2	3	4	5	6	7	8	Final
(Scotland) James Craik	0	0	0	1	0	1	0	X	2
(Netherlands) Wouter Gösgens 🔨	0	1	1	0	2	0	1	X	5

=== Draw 8 ===
Saturday, August 19, 8:00 am

Sheet 1	1	2	3	4	5	6	7	8	Final
(Scotland) Ross Whyte	1	1	1	1	1	0	X	X	5
(Switzerland) Jan Iseli 🔨	0	0	0	0	0	1	X	X	1

Sheet 2	1	2	3	4	5	6	7	8	Final
(Scotland) Cameron Bryce	0	3	0	1	0	3	3	X	10
(Germany) Alexander Baumann 🔨	1	0	0	0	2	0	0	X	3

Sheet 3	1	2	3	4	5	6	7	8	Final
(United States) Team Dropkin 🔨	2	0	1	1	0	2	1	X	7
(Switzerland) Andrin Schnider	0	2	0	0	2	0	0	X	4

Sheet 4	1	2	3	4	5	6	7	8	Final
(Germany) Benny Kapp	0	0	0	0	0	0	X	X	0
(Norway) Magnus Ramsfjell 🔨	0	2	1	1	1	1	X	X	6

=== Draw 9 ===
Saturday, August 19, 11:00 am

Sheet 1	1	2	3	4	5	6	7	8	9	Final
(Switzerland) Marco Hösli 🔨	3	0	0	0	1	0	1	0	0	5
(Italy) Joël Retornaz	0	2	1	0	0	1	0	1	1	6

Sheet 2	1	2	3	4	5	6	7	8	Final
(Switzerland) Yannick Schwaller	0	1	0	1	0	0	1	1	4
(Scotland) James Craik 🔨	1	0	2	0	1	1	0	0	5

Sheet 3	1	2	3	4	5	6	7	8	Final
(Czech Republic) Lukáš Klíma	1	0	5	0	0	1	1	X	8
(Netherlands) Wouter Gösgens 🔨	0	1	0	1	2	0	0	X	4

Sheet 4	1	2	3	4	5	6	7	8	Final
(Scotland) Kyle Waddell 🔨	1	0	0	0	0	5	0	X	6
(Norway) Lukas Høstmælingen	0	1	0	0	0	0	1	X	2

=== Draw 10 ===
Saturday, August 19, 3:00 pm

Sheet 1	1	2	3	4	5	6	7	8	Final
(Switzerland) Yves Stocker 🔨	2	1	1	0	1	0	0	1	6
(Germany) Benny Kapp	0	0	0	3	0	1	1	0	5

Sheet 2	1	2	3	4	5	6	7	8	Final
(Scotland) Ross Whyte 🔨	2	3	0	0	2	1	X	X	8
(Norway) Magnus Ramsfjell	0	0	0	2	0	0	X	X	2

Sheet 3	1	2	3	4	5	6	7	8	Final
(Switzerland) Michael Brunner 🔨	2	0	0	0	2	0	X	X	4
(Scotland) Cameron Bryce	0	2	1	3	0	3	X	X	9

Sheet 4	1	2	3	4	5	6	7	8	Final
(United States) Team Dropkin 🔨	2	0	0	1	0	1	0	0	4
(Germany) Alexander Baumann	0	2	1	0	2	0	0	1	6

== Playoffs ==
Quarterfinals
1	(Italy) Joël Retornaz	6
8	(Scotland) Kyle Waddell	2
4	(Scotland) James Craik	8
5	(Switzerland) Michael Brunner	3
2	(Scotland) Cameron Bryce	8
7	(Norway) Magnus Ramsfjell	4
3	(Scotland) Ross Whyte	4
6	(Switzerland) Yannick Schwaller	3

Semifinals
1	(Italy) Joël Retornaz	8
4	(Scotland) James Craik	0
2	(Scotland) Cameron Bryce	6
3	(Scotland) Ross Whyte	5

Final
1	(Italy) Joël Retornaz	6
2	(Scotland) Cameron Bryce	1

=== Quarterfinals ===
Saturday, August 19, 8:30 pm

Sheet 1	1	2	3	4	5	6	7	8	Final
(Scotland) James Craik 🔨	2	0	1	0	0	1	1	3	8
(Switzerland) Michael Brunner	0	1	0	1	1	0	0	0	3

Sheet 2	1	2	3	4	5	6	7	8	Final
(Italy) Joël Retornaz 🔨	0	1	3	0	0	2	0	X	6
(Scotland) Kyle Waddell	0	0	0	1	0	0	1	X	2

Sheet 3	1	2	3	4	5	6	7	8	Final
(Scotland) Ross Whyte 🔨	0	2	0	1	1	0	0	X	4
(Switzerland) Yannick Schwaller	1	0	1	0	0	0	1	X	3

Sheet 4	1	2	3	4	5	6	7	8	Final
(Scotland) Cameron Bryce 🔨	2	0	2	0	4	0	X	X	8
(Norway) Magnus Ramsfjell	0	2	0	1	0	1	X	X	4

=== Semifinals ===
Sunday, August 20, 9:00 am

Sheet 2	1	2	3	4	5	6	7	8	9	Final
(Scotland) Cameron Bryce 🔨	0	1	0	2	0	2	0	0	1	6
(Scotland) Ross Whyte	0	0	2	0	1	0	0	2	0	5

Sheet 3	1	2	3	4	5	6	7	8	Final
(Italy) Joël Retornaz 🔨	0	2	1	1	4	X	X	X	8
(Scotland) James Craik	0	0	0	0	0	X	X	X	0

=== Final ===
Sunday, August 20, 1:30 pm

Sheet 2	1	2	3	4	5	6	7	8	Final
(Italy) Joël Retornaz 🔨	0	0	2	3	0	1	X	X	6
(Scotland) Cameron Bryce	0	0	0	0	1	0	X	X	1
