= Blair Haswell =

Scottish curler

- Curler
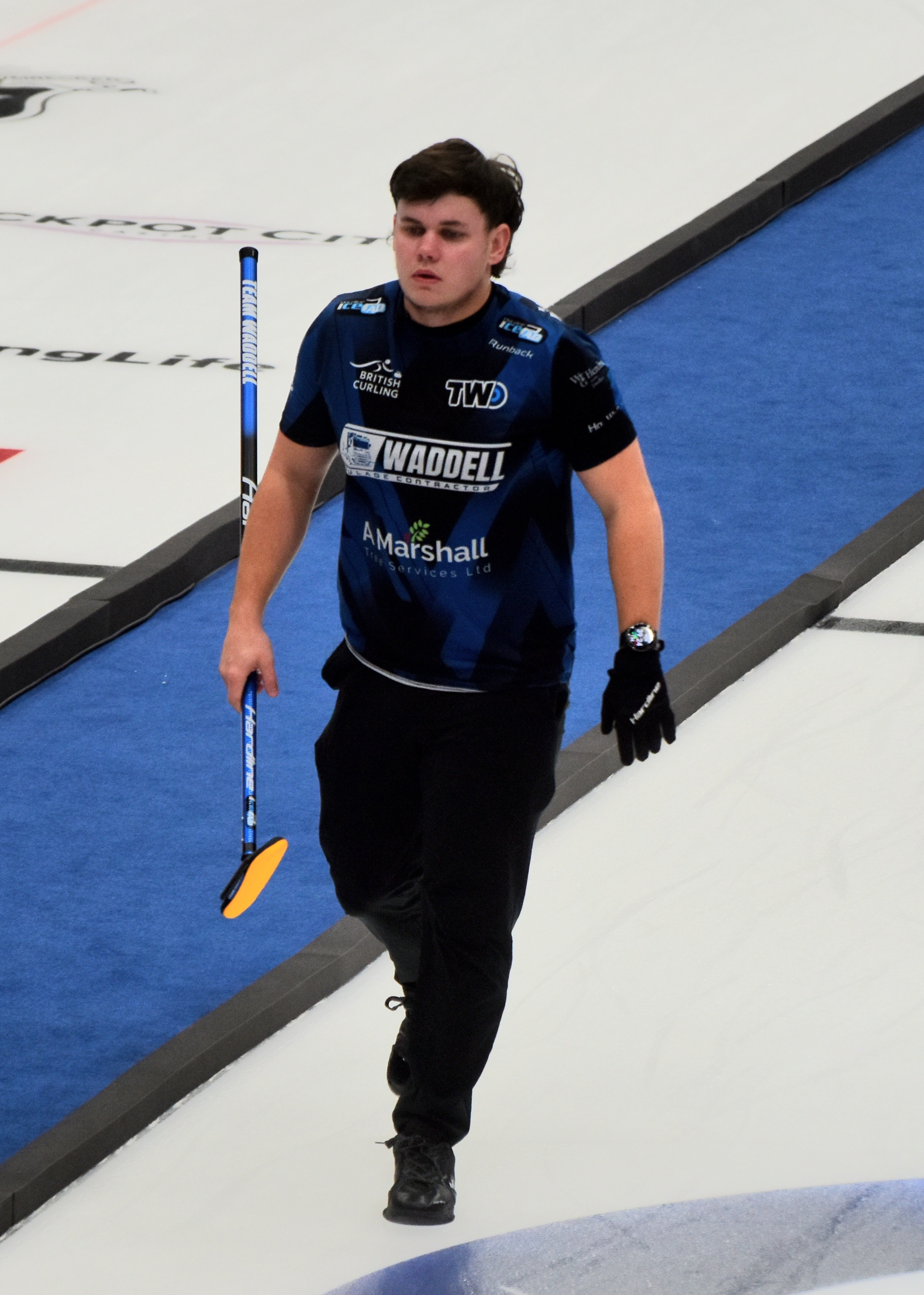
- Haswell at the 2026 Players' Championship.
- Born: 9 December 1999 (age 26); Stranraer, Scotland

Team
- Curling club: Castle Kennedy CC, Stranraer, SCO
- Skip: Kyle Waddell
- Third: Mark Watt
- Second: Angus Bryce
- Lead: Blair Haswell

Curling career
- Member Association: Scotland; Great Britain
Medal record
Men's curling
Representing Great Britain
World University Games
Gold medal – first place	2023 Saranac Lake
Representing Scotland
World Junior Championships
Bronze medal – third place	2020 Krasnoyarsk
Scottish Men's Championship
Silver medal – second place	2023 Dumfries
Silver medal – second place	2024 Dumfries
Silver medal – second place	2026 Aberdeen
Bronze medal – third place	2025 Dumfries
Scottish Mixed Doubles Championship
Bronze medal – third place	2023 Perth

Blair Haswell (born 9 December 1999 in Stranraer) is a Scottish curler residing in Stirling. He currently plays lead on Team Kyle Waddell. Playing for James Craik, Haswell won gold at the 2023 Winter World University Games and bronze at the 2020 World Junior Curling Championships.

== Career ==
=== Juniors ===
Haswell won the Scottish Junior Curling Championships in 2020, playing second for James Craik. The team also included third Mark Watt and lead Niall Ryder. This earned the rink the right to represent Scotland at the 2020 World Junior Curling Championships, in Krasnoyarsk, Russia. There, they topped the round robin with a 7–2 record, earning themselves a spot in the playoffs. The team then lost to Switzerland's Marco Hösli 9–6 in the semifinal before defeating Germany's Sixten Totzek 6–5 to capture the bronze medal. With Haswell aging out of juniors following the cancelled 2020–21 season, he joined Watt's newly created team with third Gregor Cannon and lead Gavin Barr. This lineup saw limited success, only reaching the playoffs in two of seven World Curling Tour events and finishing with a 4–6 record at the 2022 Scottish Curling Championships.

=== Men's ===
Haswell and Watt reunited with former teammates Craik and Angus Bryce for the 2022–23 season, forming a team to represent Great Britain at the 2023 Winter World University Games. On the European tour, the team found success, reaching the semifinals of the 2022 Oslo Cup and 2023 Mercure Perth Masters and the quarterfinals of four other events. This set the team up for a dominant run at the University Games, going 8–1 through the round robin and beating Canada's Dalhousie University team (skipped by Owen Purcell) in the semifinal to advance to the final. There, they beat the United States' Daniel Casper to claim the gold medal, becoming the second British men's team to do so. After the championship, the team returned home to the Scottish men's championship where they reached the playoffs with a 5–2 record in the round robin. They then beat Ross Whyte in the semifinal before coming up short to Bruce Mouat in the final, who went on to win the 2023 World Men's Curling Championship.

Now focused solely on men's play, Team Craik began the 2023–24 season with back-to-back playoff finishes at the 2023 Baden Masters and the 2023 Euro Super Series, losing out to Joël Retornaz and Bruce Mouat respectively. In October, the team went undefeated to win the Grand Prix Bern Inter, Haswell's first tour victory. With the points they accumulated throughout the 2022–23 and start of the 2023–24 season, the team rose high enough in the ranks to qualify for the 2023 National Grand Slam event. They previously competed in the 2023 Tour Challenge Tier 2 event, however, lost in the quarterfinals to Mike McEwen. At the National, the team went 2–2 in the round robin, just enough to squeak into the playoff round. They were then defeated by Yannick Schwaller 6–5 in the quarterfinals. Team Craik also had enough points to play in the next two Slams, the 2023 Masters and the 2024 Canadian Open. After missing the playoffs at the Masters, the team again went 2–2 at the Canadian Open and had a good enough draw total to reach the playoffs. This time, it was Mouat who took them out in the quarterfinal round by a 5–4 score. In February, the team had another strong showing at the national men's championship, going 6–2 in the round robin and qualifying for the 1 vs. 2 game. There, they lost 7–3 to Team Whyte but rebounded with a 9–1 win over Team Mouat to reach the final. There, they again came up short to Whyte, losing 7–6. The team ended their season at the 2024 Players' Championship Slam where they went 1–4.

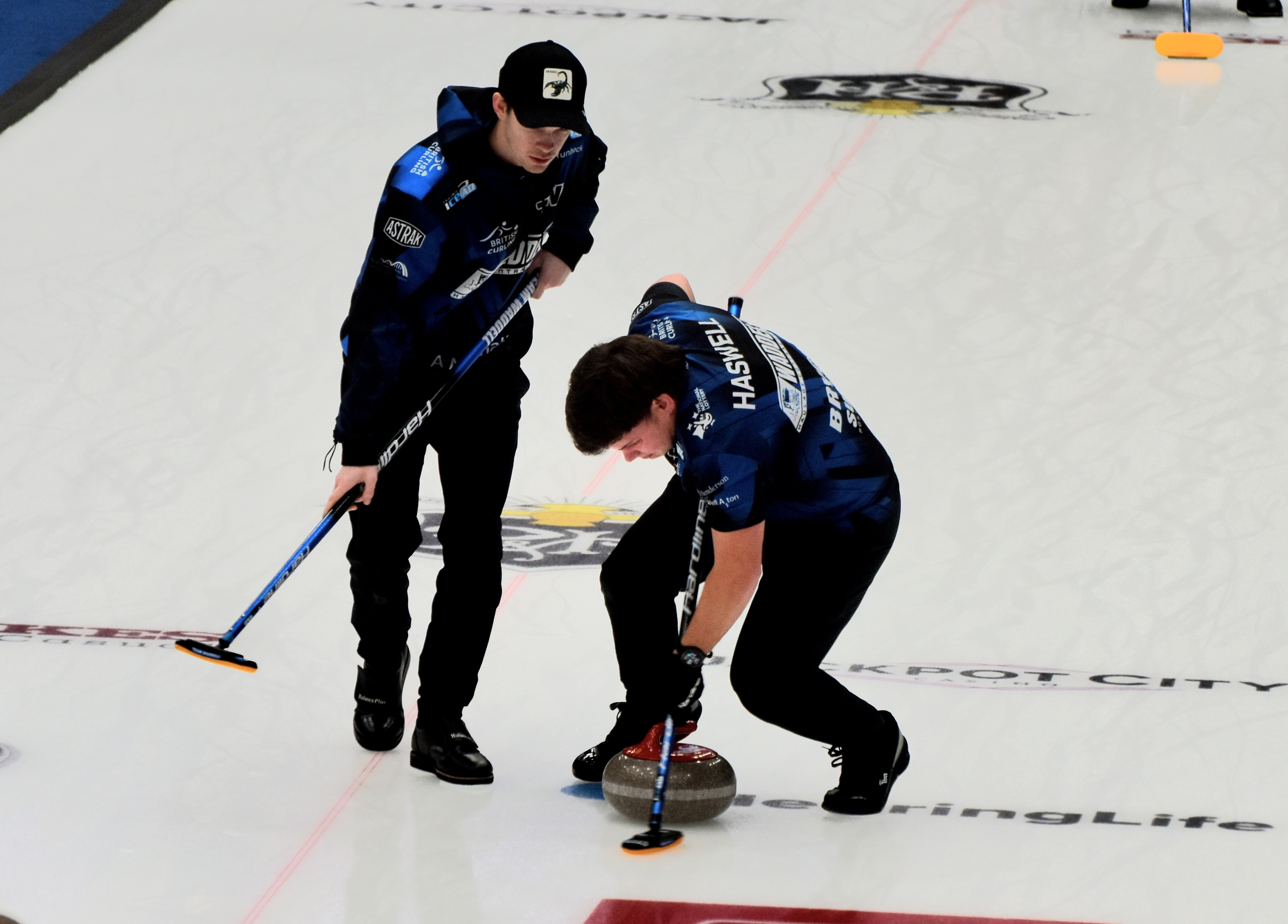
Haswell sweeps a rock at the 2026 Players' Championship in Steinbach, Manitoba.

Team Craik reached the playoffs at the first Slam of the 2024–25 season, losing to Team Mouat in the quarterfinals of the 2024 Tour Challenge. They also made the playoffs at the 2024 Euro Super Series and the Grand Prix Bern Inter, losing out in the quarterfinals and semifinals respectively. They had less success at the next two Slams, missing the playoffs at both the 2024 Canadian Open and the 2024 National. With only three playoff appearances on tour, they fell out of Slam contention by the end of the first half of the season. In the new year, they finished third through the round robin of the Scottish championship with a 6–2 record. They then lost in the semifinal to Team Whyte who went on to win the event. In February, they won their first event by going undefeated to claim the Sun City Cup. The team ended their season at the Aberdeen International Curling Championship where they lost in the final to Cameron Bryce.

In the off season, British Curling shuffled around their men's lineups with Haswell, Bryce and Watt forming a new team with Kyle and Craig Waddell for the 2025–26 season.

=== Mixed doubles ===
Haswell played in his first Scottish Mixed Doubles Curling Championship in 2022 with partner Eilidh Yeats. There, the pair finished 1–4 through the round robin, not advancing to the playoffs. The following year, he fared much better with Amy MacDonald, going 4–1 in the round robin and qualifying for the knockout round. In the quarterfinals, the team won 5–4 over Kirstin Bousie and Craig Waddell before losing to Sophie Jackson and Duncan McFadzean 9–3 in the semifinal, settling for third. In 2024, MacDonald and Haswell again teamed up and went 5–2 through the round robin, however, missed the playoffs due to a poor draw total.

== Personal life ==
Haswell previously studied at the University of Stirling and the University of Strathclyde, which he represented at the 2023 Winter World University Games.

== Teams ==
Season	Skip	Third	Second	Lead	Alternate
2016–17	Blair Haswell	Adam Keron	Cameron Paterson	Adam MacDiarmid	
2017–18	Blair Haswell	Adam Keron	Cameron Paterson	Adam MacDiarmid	
2018–19	Blair Haswell	Adam Keron	Tim Hof	Bill Turner	
2019–20	James Craik	Mark Watt	Blair Haswell	Niall Ryder	
2020–21	James Craik	Mark Watt	Blair Haswell	Niall Ryder	
2021–22	Mark Watt	Gregor Cannon	Blair Haswell	Gavin Barr	
2022–23	James Craik	Mark Watt	Angus Bryce	Blair Haswell	Jack Carrick
2023–24	James Craik	Mark Watt	Angus Bryce	Blair Haswell	
2024–25	James Craik	Mark Watt	Angus Bryce	Blair Haswell	
2025–26	Kyle Waddell	Mark Watt	Angus Bryce	Blair Haswell	
2026–27	Kyle Waddell	Mark Watt	Angus Bryce	Blair Haswell	
