= Sara McManus =

Swedish curler (born 1991)

- Curler
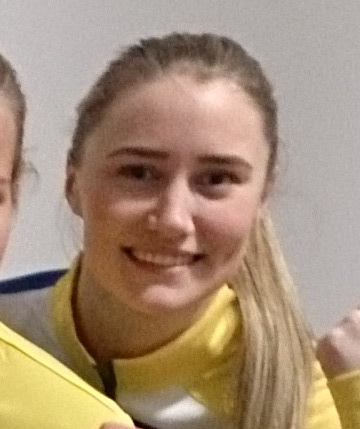
- McManus at the 2015 Winter Universiade
- Born: Sara McManus; 13 December 1991 (age 34); Gothenburg, Sweden

Team
- Curling club: Sundbybergs CK, Sundbyberg, SWE
- Skip: Anna Hasselborg
- Third: Sara McManus
- Second: Agnes Knochenhauer
- Lead: Sofia Scharback

Curling career
- Member Association: Sweden
- World Championship: 10 (2014, 2015, 2017, 2018, 2019, 2021, 2022, 2023, 2024, 2025)
- European Championship: 8 (2014, 2016, 2017, 2018, 2019, 2021, 2024, 2025)
- Olympic: 3 (2018, 2022, 2026)
- Grand Slam victories: 8 (2018 Elite 10 (Sept.), 2018 Masters, 2019 Tour Challenge, 2019 National, 2020 Canadian Open, 2021 National, 2022 Players', 2025 Masters)
Medal record
Women's curling
Representing Sweden
Olympic Games
Gold medal – first place	2018 Pyeongchang	Team
Gold medal – first place	2026 Milano Cortina	Team
Bronze medal – third place	2022 Beijing	Team
World Championships
Silver medal – second place	2018 North Bay
Silver medal – second place	2019 Silkeborg
European Championships
Gold medal – first place	2018 Tallinn
Gold medal – first place	2019 Helsingborg
Gold medal – first place	2025 Lohja
Silver medal – second place	2016 Renfrewshire
Silver medal – second place	2017 St Gallen
Silver medal – second place	2021 Lillehammer
Silver medal – second place	2024 Lohja
World Junior Championships
Gold medal – first place	2010 Flims

Sara McManus (born 13 December 1991) is a Swedish curler from Gävle. She currently plays third on Team Anna Hasselborg. With the Hasselborg rink, she won the gold medal in women's curling at the 2018 and 2026 Winter Olympics.

== Career ==
McManus was the alternate for the Swedish team at the 2009 and 2010 World Junior Curling Championships. The team, which was skipped by Anna Hasselborg, finished in sixth place in 2009 and won the gold medal in 2010. While McManus was listed as an alternate, the team acted as a five-player team, with McManus throwing lead rocks in most of the team's games. The team was taken over by McManus' sister Jonna as skip for the 2011 World Junior Curling Championships where the team placed fourth, with Sara throwing third stones.

Sara took over the team as skip for the 2012 and 2013 World Junior Curling Championships respectively. In 2012, she led her team of Anna Huhta, Marina Stener, and Sofia Mabergs to a 6-3 round robin finish, which put them in a four-way tie for 3rd place. The team won their tiebreak match against Japan and their next playoff game against Russia. However, they lost in the semifinal to the Czech Republic and the bronze medal game in a re-match with the Russians, finishing in fourth place.

At the 2013 Juniors, McManus again skipped the Swedish junior team with Mabergs and a new front-end of Rosalie Egli and Malin Ekholm. She led the team to a 5-4 round robin record, again in a four-way tie for third place. The team then lost to the Russians in a tiebreak, finishing 5th place.

McManus skipped the University of Gävle team, representing Sweden at the 2015 Winter Universiade. There, she led her team of Cecilia Östlund, Huhta, and Mabergs to a 7-2 round robin record in a tie for second place with Russia. However, in the playoffs, they lost to Russia in the semifinal and then Switzerland in the bronze medal game, finishing in fourth place.

McManus was invited to be the alternate on the Swedish team at the 2014 Ford World Women's Curling Championship. The team, which Margaretha Sigfridsson skipped ended up losing the tiebreaker to South Korea, finishing in 5th place. McManus did not play in any games.

McManus would again be the alternate at team Sweden, this time at the 2014 European Curling Championships, on a team skipped by Anna Hasselborg. The team finished fifth, with McManus again not playing in any games.

McManus was invited to play second for the Sigfridsson rink, which was representing Sweden at the 2015 World Women's Curling Championship. The team finished in 7th place, missing the playoffs with a 5-6 round robin record.

In the following season, McManus joined the Hasselborg rink as the third, with the rink representing Sweden at the 2016 European Curling Championships. After finishing the round robin in second place with an 8–2 record, the team won their semifinal match against the Czechs before losing in the final against Russia's Viktoriia Moiseeva rink, earning the team silver medals. The rink represented Sweden again later in the season at the 2017 World Women's Curling Championship, where they came just short of winning a medal finishing in fourth. The next season, the team made it all the way to the final of the 2018 World Women's Curling Championship before losing to Canada's Jennifer Jones. Team Hasselborg won back-to-back Grand Slam events at the start of the 2018-19 season, the Elite 10 and the Masters. The team lost once again the final of the World Women's Curling Championship this year to Silvana Tirinzoni and Switzerland.

Team Hasselborg began the 2019–20 season at the Stu Sells Oakville Tankard, where they defeated Anna Sidorova in the final. They missed the playoffs at the 2019 AMJ Campbell Shorty Jenkins Classic after going 2–2 in the round robin. They defended their title at the 2019 European Curling Championships. Down 4–3 in the tenth end of the final to Scotland's Eve Muirhead, Hasselborg made a runback on her final stone to score two and win. In Grand Slam play, Team Hasselborg were the most dominant team on the women's side, winning them the 2019–20 Pinty's Cup. They lost in the semifinal of the Masters to Tracy Fleury before winning the next three Slams, the Tour Challenge, National and the Canadian Open. The team was set to represent Sweden at the 2020 World Women's Curling Championship before the event got cancelled due to the COVID-19 pandemic. The Canadian Open would be their last event of the season as both the Players' Championship and the Champions Cup Grand Slam events were also cancelled due to the pandemic.

The Hasselborg rink won the first event of the 2020–21 season, defeating Raphaela Keiser in the final of the 2020 Women's Masters Basel. Next, they played Team Wranå in the Sweden National Challenge in December 2020, where they lost 17–12. A "curling bubble" was set up in Calgary, Canada in the spring, which hosted several events, including the 2021 World Women's Curling Championship and two slams. Team Hasselborg competed in both the 2021 Champions Cup and the 2021 Players' Championship, finishing 0–4 at the Champions Cup and reaching the semifinals of the Players'. The following week, the team represented Sweden at the Worlds. They finished third through the round robin with a 10–3 record, qualifying them for the playoffs. After defeating Canada's Kerri Einarson 8–3 in the qualification round, they lost a narrow 8–7 semifinal against the RCF, skipped by Alina Kovaleva. This put them in the bronze medal game, which they lost 9–5 to the Tabitha Peterson rink of the United States. On 4 June 2021, Team Hasselborg was selected as the Olympic Team for the 2022 Winter Olympics.

Team Hasselborg began the 2021–22 season competing in the men's Baden Masters tour event, where they missed the playoffs. At the 2021 Women's Masters Basel, the team made it all the way to the final, where they lost to Denmark's Madeleine Dupont. Next, they played in the 2021 Masters Grand Slam event, where they again missed the playoffs. They were able to rebound at the 2021 National, however, claiming the title with a 9–6 victory over Tracy Fleury in the final game. In November, Team Hasselborg again represented Sweden at the 2021 European Curling Championships where they finished third in the round robin with a 7–2 record. They then defeated Russia's Alina Kovaleva in the semifinal before dropping the final to Scotland's Eve Muirhead, settling for silver. The next event for Team Hasselborg was the 2022 Winter Olympics, where they attempted to defend their gold medal from 2018. The team placed second after the round robin preliminary stage with a 7–2 record. This earned them a semifinal berth where they would face Great Britain's Muirhead rink. In one of the highest-scoring games in curling, Muirhead scored a single point in the extra end to win 12–11, ending Hasselborg's chances of repeating as Olympic gold medallists. They did still earn a medal from the Games, however, as they were able to beat Switzerland's Silvana Tirinzoni rink 9–7 in the bronze medal game. Next for the Swedish rink was the 2022 World Women's Curling Championship, where they finished fourth in the round robin with a 9–3 record. They then defeated the United States Cory Christensen in the qualification game before dropping the semifinal and bronze medal games to Switzerland and Canada, respectively, placing fourth. Team Hasselborg wrapped up their season at the final two Slams of the season, the 2022 Players' Championship and the 2022 Champions Cup. At the Players', the team began with two straight losses before rattling off six straight victories to claim the event title, despite McManus and Anna Hasselborg feeling ill in the final game due to food poisoning. With the victory, Team Hasselborg became the first women's team to win a career Grand Slam (winning all four 'majors'). At the Champions Cup, they went undefeated up until the semifinal round where they were eliminated by Kerri Einarson.

In their first event of the 2022–23 season, Team Hasselborg won the 2022 Oslo Cup. After a 4–1 round robin record, the team knocked off Isabella Wranå in the semifinal and the newly formed Kaitlyn Lawes rink in the championship game. Next for the team was the European Qualifier best-of-seven series between them and Team Wranå. Team Hasselborg won the series 4–1, becoming the Swedish team for the 2022 European Curling Championships. In their first Slam of the season, the 2022 National, the team missed the playoffs with a 1–3 record, meaning they would not have the chance to repeat as champions for a third year in a row. After the National, McManus went on maternity leave. During that time, the team had two quarterfinal appearances at Slams at the 2022 Tour Challenge and the 2023 Canadian Open. With Johanna Heldin and Therese Westman in as spares for McManus, Team Hasselborg went undefeated to win the Sundbyberg Open, and finished 5–4 at the 2022 European Curling Championships. In February, she returned to the team and they won the Swedish Women's Curling Championship and the Swedish World Qualifier over Team Wranå, qualifying for the World Championship. In their final event before the Worlds, the team lost in the final of the Sun City Cup to Marianne Rørvik. At the 2023 World Women's Curling Championship, which was held in Sandviken, the team finished fifth through the round robin with a 7–5 record, enough to make the playoffs. After defeating Italy in the qualification game, they once again lost both the semifinal and the bronze medal game to Switzerland and Canada to finish fourth. The team finished their season at the 2023 Players' Championship and the 2023 Champions Cup. After missing the playoffs at the Players', the team made it to the quarterfinals of the Champions Cup where they lost 7–6 to Team Homan. McManus threw fourth stones for the team during the Champions Cup, with Hasselborg on maternity leave.

Back together for the 2023–24 season, Team Hasselborg defended their title at the 2023 Oslo Cup, stealing the victory against Marianne Rørvik. They then made a second straight final at the 2023 Women's Masters Basel before falling short to Silvana Tirinzoni. At the best-of-seven European qualifier against Isabella Wranå, the team lost the series 4–2, meaning they would not represent Sweden for the first time since 2015. Back on tour, the team rebounded immediately by winning the 2023 Players Open, downing Team Wranå in the final. At the first Slam of the season, the 2023 Tour Challenge, the team went unbeaten until the semifinals where they were stopped by Jennifer Jones. They also reached the semifinals of the 2023 National before losing to Rachel Homan. After missing the playoffs at the 2023 Western Showdown, the team had back-to-back quarterfinal finishes at the 2023 Masters and the 2024 Canadian Open, losing out to Team Jones on both occasions. Days before the 2024 Swedish Women's Championship, Team Hasselborg was appointed to represent Sweden at the 2024 World Women's Curling Championship as they had accumulated more points than Team Wranå throughout the first part of the season. Still, the team went on to win the Swedish Championship. At the Worlds, Team Hasselborg started with three consecutive losses before turning things around, finishing the round robin in fifth place with a 7–5 record. They then lost to Korea's Gim Eun-ji in the qualification round, eliminating them from medal contention. The Hasselborg rink ended their season at the 2024 Players' Championship where after a 3–2 round robin record they lost in the quarterfinals to Gim.

== Personal life ==
McManus is currently engaged to Joakim Sjölund. She has one son. She is the daughter of Scottish footballer Stuart McManus.

== Grand Slam record ==
Key
C	Champion
F	Lost in Final
SF	Lost in Semifinal
QF	Lost in Quarterfinals
R16	Lost in the round of 16
Q	Did not advance to playoffs
T2	Played in Tier 2 event
DNP	Did not participate in event
N/A	Not a Grand Slam event that season

Event	2015–16	2016–17	2017–18	2018–19	2019–20	2020–21	2021–22	2022–23	2023–24	2024–25	2025–26	2026–27
Invitational	T2	SF	F	DNP	C	N/A	N/A	DNP	SF	Q	SF	QF
Masters	DNP	SF	SF	C	SF	N/A	Q	DNP	QF	C	QF	Q
National	Q	Q	DNP	QF	C	N/A	C	Q	SF	F	SF	QF
Open	DNP	SF	Q	Q	C	N/A	N/A	DNP	QF	DNP	Q	
Players'	DNP	SF	QF	F	N/A	SF	C	Q	QF	SF	Q	
Champions Cup	DNP	F	QF	SF	N/A	Q	SF	QF	N/A	N/A	N/A	N/A

=== Former events ===
Event	2018–19
Elite 10	C
