= James Craik (curler) =

Scottish curler (born 2001)

- Curler
- Born: 13 June 2001 (age 25); Aberdeen, Scotland

Team
- Curling club: Edzell CC, Forfar, SCO
- Skip: James Craik
- Third: Fraser Swanston
- Second: Jake MacDonald
- Lead: Rory Macnair
- Mixed doubles partner: Hailey Duff

Curling career
- Member Association: Scotland; Great Britain
Medal record
Men's curling
Representing Great Britain
World University Games
Gold medal – first place	2023 Saranac Lake
Representing Scotland
World Junior Championships
Gold medal – first place	2022 Jönköping
Bronze medal – third place	2019 Liverpool
Bronze medal – third place	2020 Krasnoyarsk
Scottish Men's Championship
Silver medal – second place	2023 Dumfries
Silver medal – second place	2024 Dumfries
Bronze medal – third place	2022 Dumfries
Bronze medal – third place	2025 Dumfries

James Craik (born 13 June 2001 in Aberdeen) is a Scottish curler from Edzell and Stirling. Skipping his own team, Craik won gold at the 2022 World Junior Curling Championships and 2023 Winter World University Games and bronze at the 2020 World Junior Curling Championships. He also won bronze at the 2019 World Junior Curling Championships as second for Ross Whyte.

== Career ==
=== 2019–2022 ===
In 2019, Craik won his first of three Scottish Junior Curling Championships as second for Ross Whyte. The team, including third Duncan McFadzean and lead Euan Kyle went undefeated to win the event, downing Callum Kinnear 10–6 in the championship game. With the win, they represented Scotland at the 2019 World Junior Curling Championships where they went undefeated in the round robin, finishing with a 9–0 record. They suffered their first loss in the semifinals following a narrow 10–9 game against Switzerland but rebounded to defeat Norway in the bronze medal game. The following year, Craik returned to skipping, leading his team of Mark Watt, Blair Haswell and Niall Ryder to victory at the 2020 Scottish junior championship. At the 2020 World Junior Curling Championships, in Krasnoyarsk, Russia, they topped the round robin with a 7–2 record, earning themselves a spot in the playoffs. The team then lost again to Switzerland in the semifinal before defeating Germany to capture the bronze medal for a second year in a row.

After being delayed to the fall due to the COVID-19 pandemic in Scotland, Craik again defended his Scottish junior title in November 2021. With new teammates Angus Bryce and Scott Hyslop and Niall Ryder at lead, the team won all ten of their games at the national championship including a 9–6 win over Jack Strawhorn in the championship final. In preparation for the 2022 World Junior Curling Championships in May, the team competed in the 2022 Scottish Curling Championships. There, they finished 6–4 through the double round robin, finishing third and advancing to the playoffs. They then lost 7–2 to eventual champion Ross Paterson in the semifinal, earning the bronze medal. Entering the world junior championship as the highest ranked team, Craik led his squad to an 8–1 round robin record, in sole first-place possession. This time, the team advanced through the semifinal game by defeating Norway's Grunde Buraas 7–5. They then claimed the gold medal with a dominant 7–1 win over Germany's Benjamin Kapp.

=== 2022–present ===
Craik and Bryce reunited with former teammates Mark Watt and Blair Haswell for the 2022–23 season, forming a team to represent Great Britain at the 2023 Winter World University Games. On the European tour, the team found success, reaching the semifinals of the 2022 Oslo Cup and 2023 Mercure Perth Masters and the quarterfinals of four other events. This set the team up for a dominant run at the University Games, going 8–1 through the round robin and beating Canada's Dalhousie University team (skipped by Owen Purcell) in the semifinal to advance to the final. There, they beat the United States' Daniel Casper to claim the gold medal, becoming the second British men's team to do so. After the championship, the team returned home to the Scottish men's championship where they again reached the playoffs with a 5–2 record in the round robin. They then beat Ross Whyte in the semifinal before coming up short to Bruce Mouat in the final, who went on to win the 2023 World Men's Curling Championship. Craik ended the season by playing in his first personal Grand Slam of Curling event, the 2023 Players' Championship. Sparing for Bendik Ramsfjell on Team Magnus Ramsfjell, the team missed the playoffs with a 2–3 record.

Now focused solely on men's play, Team Craik began the 2023–24 season with back-to-back playoff finishes at the 2023 Baden Masters and the 2023 Euro Super Series, losing out to Joël Retornaz and Bruce Mouat respectively. In October, the team went undefeated to win the Grand Prix Bern Inter, Craik's first tour victory. With the points they accumulated throughout the 2022–23 and start of the 2023–24 season, the team rose high enough in the ranks to qualify for the 2023 National Grand Slam event. They previously competed in the 2023 Tour Challenge Tier 2 event, however, lost in the quarterfinals to Mike McEwen. At the National, the team went 2–2 in the round robin, just enough to squeak into the playoff round. They were then defeated by Yannick Schwaller 6–5 in the quarterfinals. Team Craik also had enough points to play in the next two Slams, the 2023 Masters and the 2024 Canadian Open. After missing the playoffs at the Masters, the team again went 2–2 at the Canadian Open and had a good enough draw total to reach the playoffs. This time, it was Mouat who took them out in the quarterfinal round by a 5–4 score. In February, the team had another strong showing at the national men's championship, going 6–2 in the round robin and qualifying for the 1 vs. 2 game. There, they lost 7–3 to Team Whyte but rebounded with a 9–1 win over Team Mouat to reach the final. There, they again came up short to Whyte, losing 7–6. The team ended their season at the 2024 Players' Championship Slam where they went 1–4.

Team Craik reached the playoffs at the first Slam of the 2024–25 season, losing to Team Mouat in the quarterfinals of the 2024 Tour Challenge. They also made the playoffs at the 2024 Euro Super Series and the Grand Prix Bern Inter, losing out in the quarterfinals and semifinals respectively. They had less success at the next two Slams, missing the playoffs at both the 2024 Canadian Open and the 2024 National. With only three playoff appearances on tour, they fell out of Slam contention by the end of the first half of the season. In the new year, they finished third through the round robin of the Scottish championship with a 6–2 record. They then lost in the semifinal to Team Whyte who went on to win the event. In February, they won their first event by going undefeated to claim the Sun City Cup. The team ended their season at the Aberdeen International Curling Championship where they lost in the final to Cameron Bryce.

In the off season, British Curling shuffled around their men's lineups with Craik being chosen to skip a new team of Fraser Swanston, Jake MacDonald and Rory Macnair for the 2025–26 season.

== Personal life ==
Craik studied business management at the University of Stirling. He began curling at age six. His brother Ross is also a curler and represented Great Britain at the 2020 Winter Youth Olympics.

== Grand Slam record ==
Key
C	Champion
F	Lost in Final
SF	Lost in Semifinal
QF	Lost in Quarterfinals
R16	Lost in the round of 16
Q	Did not advance to playoffs
T2	Played in Tier 2 event
DNP	Did not participate in event
N/A	Not a Grand Slam event that season

Event	2022–23	2023–24	2024–25	2025–26
Masters	DNP	Q	DNP	DNP
Tour Challenge	DNP	T2	QF	U25
The National	DNP	QF	Q	DNP
Canadian Open	DNP	QF	Q	DNP
Players'	Q (Note: Craik spared for Bendik Ramsfjell on Team Magnus Ramsfjell.)	Q	DNP	DNP

== Teams ==
Season	Skip	Third	Second	Lead	Alternate
2016–17	James Craik	Mark Watt	Matthew McKenzie	Niall Ryder	
2017–18	James Craik	Angus Bryce	Mark Watt	Niall Ryder	
2018–19	Ross Whyte	Duncan McFadzean	James Craik	Euan Kyle	Ryan McCormack
2019–20	James Craik	Mark Watt	Blair Haswell	Niall Ryder	
2020–21	James Craik	Mark Watt	Blair Haswell	Niall Ryder	
2021–22	James Craik	Angus Bryce	Scott Hyslop	Niall Ryder	Jack Carrick
2022–23	James Craik	Mark Watt	Angus Bryce	Blair Haswell	Jack Carrick
2023–24	James Craik	Mark Watt	Angus Bryce	Blair Haswell	
2024–25	James Craik	Mark Watt	Angus Bryce	Blair Haswell	
2025–26	James Craik	Fraser Swanston	Jake MacDonald	Rory Macnair	
