= Duncan McFadzean =

Scottish curler (born 1999)

- Curler
- Born: 9 October 1999 (age 27); Perth, Scotland

Team
- Curling club: Airleywright CC, Perth, SCO
- Mixed doubles partner: Sophie Jackson

Curling career
- Member Association: Scotland; Great Britain
- World Championship: 1 (2026)
- World Mixed Doubles Championship: 1 (2024)
- Grand Slam victories: 1 (2025 Masters)
Medal record
Men's curling
Representing Great Britain
Winter Universiade
Bronze medal – third place	2019 Krasnoyarsk
Representing Scotland
World Championships
Bronze medal – third place	2026 Ogden
World Junior Championships
Silver medal – second place	2018 Aberdeen
Bronze medal – third place	2019 Liverpool
Scottish Men's Championship
Gold medal – first place	2024 Dumfries
Gold medal – first place	2025 Dumfries
Gold medal – first place	2026 Dumfries
Silver medal – second place	2022 Dumfries
Bronze medal – third place	2023 Dumfries
Scottish Mixed Doubles Championship
Gold medal – first place	2024 Perth
Silver medal – second place	2023 Perth
Silver medal – second place	2025 Aberdeen
Bronze medal – third place	2026 Aberdeen

Duncan McFadzean (born 9 October 1999) is a Scottish curler from Perth. Playing for Ross Whyte, McFadzean won gold at the 2024 Scottish Men's Curling Championship, silver at the 2018 World Junior Curling Championships and bronze at the 2019 World Junior Curling Championships and 2019 Winter Universiade. He also won gold at the 2024 Scottish Mixed Doubles Curling Championship with Sophie Jackson and represented the country at the 2024 World Mixed Doubles Curling Championship.

== Career ==
=== Juniors ===
McFadzean found most of his junior success as a member of the Ross Whyte rink. At the 2017 Scottish Junior Curling Championships, he played lead on the team that also included third Callum Kinnear and second Ryan McCormack. At the championship, the team had a strong showing, finishing 6–1 through the round robin and earning a playoff spot. They then lost both the 1 vs. 2 game and the final to the Cameron Bryce rink, finishing second. Whyte left the team the following season and Kinnear stepped up as their new skip. At the 2018 Scottish junior championship, the team lost just one game in the round robin to Whyte's new team and lost to them again in the final, once again taking silver. After the event, McFadzean was invited to join Team Whyte at the 2018 World Junior Curling Championships as their alternate. There, the team topped the round robin with an unblemished 9–0 record. They then defeated Switzerland in the semifinal to qualify for the world junior final. Tied in an extra end, the Scottish rink lost 6–5 to Canada's Tyler Tardi. McFadzean played in four of the team's games. He rejoined the Whyte rink at third for the 2018–19 season.

In his final year of juniors, McFadzean claimed a second Scottish junior title, once again going undefeated through the Scottish championship. At the 2019 World Junior Curling Championships, Team Whyte again went through the round robin unbeaten. They suffered their first loss in the semifinals following a narrow 10–9 game against Switzerland but rebounded to defeat Norway in the bronze medal game. The following month, McFadzean played third on the British team at the 2019 Winter Universiade. There, the team again finished atop the round robin, earning a bye to the semifinals. They then lost to Norway before claiming the bronze medal 10–5 over Switzerland.

=== Men's ===
Out of juniors, McFadzean moved to second on Team Whyte with Euan Kyle and Robin Brydone rounding out the lineup at lead and third respectively. In their first season, the team claimed two tour titles at the Prague Classic and the Dumfries Challenger Series. They also reached the final of the Grant Prix Bern Inter Curling Challenge and were semifinalists at five other tour stops. Their success on tour was not replicated at the Scottish championship, however, as they finished 4–3 and failed to advance to the playoffs. Despite this, the team ranked seventeenth in the world at the end of the season after starting in fifty-fifth. For much of the 2020–21 season, there was no tour due to the COVID-19 pandemic. In the four domestic challenges Team Whyte played in, they lost in the final of all four to Team Bruce Mouat.

Team Whyte had a strong start to the 2021–22 season, reaching the final of the 2021 Euro Super Series where they lost to Yannick Schwaller. After a quarterfinal finish in their second event, they won the KW Fall Classic with an unbeaten record, defeating fellow Scotts Team Ross Paterson in the final. They also made the final of their next event, the ATB Okotoks Classic, where they lost to Kevin Koe. With the points they accumulated from the first part of the season, Team Whyte qualified for the 2021 Masters, their first Grand Slam of Curling event. Through the triple knockout, the team qualified through the C side to enter the playoffs before losing to the Mouat rink in the quarterfinals. They also played in the next Grand Slam, the 2021 National, again qualifying for the playoffs through the C event. They then lost to Brad Gushue in the quarters. In the new year, Team Whyte entered the 2022 Scottish Men's Curling Championship as the highest ranked team as Team Mouat was competing in the Olympics. Through the round robin, the team posted an 8–2 record, securing first place. They then defeated Team Paterson in the 1 vs. 2 game before losing to them in a rematch in the final. Team Whyte ended their season with a semifinal finish at the Aberdeen International Curling Championship and a 2–3 record at the 2022 Players' Championship Slam.

After having their most successful season to date, Team Whyte had mixed results throughout the 2022–23 season. At the first two Slams, the 2022 National and the 2022 Tour Challenge, the team was unsuccessful in qualifying, finishing 1–3 at both events. They turned things around in November, however, winning the Swiss Cup Basel and the Original 16 Tour Bonspiel in back-to-back weeks. In the finals, they defeated Magnus Ramsfjell and Aaron Sluchinski respectively. At the 2022 Masters, the team finished 3–1, earning a playoff spot. They were then defeated by Team Mouat in the quarterfinals. The following month, they missed the playoffs again at the 2023 Canadian Open. Back in Scotland, the team had a strong start to the Scottish championship, sitting 6–0 with one round robin game left to play. They then lost both their final round robin game and 1 vs. 2 game to Team Mouat and the semifinal to James Craik, finishing third. They rebounded at their next tour stop by going undefeated to claim the Aberdeen International Curling Championship. This included a semifinal victory over Team Mouat and a championship win over Italy's Joël Retornaz. They ended their season at the 2023 Players' Championship and 2023 Champions Cup Slam events, losing out in the tiebreaker and quarterfinals respectively.

The Whyte rink came out of the gate strong to begin the 2023–24 season, reaching the semifinals of the 2023 Baden Masters before losing consecutive finals at the 2023 Euro Super Series and the 2023 Stu Sells Oakville Tankard to Team Mouat. In their fourth event, they succeeded in capturing the 2023 AMJ Campbell Shorty Jenkins Classic, defeating Niklas Edin in the championship game. In Grand Slam play, the team had their best season to date, beginning at the 2023 Tour Challenge where they reached the semifinals. They also qualified at the 2023 National before a quarterfinal loss to Brendan Bottcher. At the 2023 Masters, the team finished with a 2–2 record which was just enough to qualify for a tiebreaker. They then defeated Team Edin to qualify before upsetting Brad Gushue and Yannick Schwaller in the quarterfinals and semifinals to reach their first Slam final. There, they fell 3–2 to Joël Retornaz. In their next two events, the team lost in the final and semifinals of the 2024 Mercure Perth Masters and 2024 Canadian Open respectively, both to the Mouat rink. Next for Team Whyte was the 2024 Scottish championship where they dominated the competition, going undefeated through the entire event. In the final, they beat James Craik 7–6 to claim their first Scottish men's title. Despite this, Team Mouat was still chosen to represent Scotland at the 2024 World Men's Curling Championship. To wrap up their season, the team had a quarterfinal finish at the 2024 Players' Championship.

The Whyte team continued this momentum from the previous season during the 2024-25 curling season, winning their first Grand Slam of Curling event at the 2025 Masters, beating Brad Jacobs in the final. They then defended their Scottish men's title in 2025, beating the current top ranked team in the world, Team Mouat, 8–3 in the final. Despite their strong results on the Grand Slam circuit and defending their men's national championship title, Team Mouat was later chosen by British Curling again to represent Scotland at the 2025 World Men's Curling Championship, who were number one in the world rankings. Team Whyte would finish the 2024-25 season at the 2025 Players' Championship, finishing 2–3.

=== Mixed doubles ===
McFadzean played in his first Scottish Mixed Doubles Curling Championship in 2022 with partner Mili Smith. There, the pair finished 4–1 through the round robin before losing in the quarterfinals to Jennifer Dodds and Bruce Mouat. After Smith retired from competitive curling, McFadzean found a new partner in Sophie Jackson. At the 2023 championship, the team finished first through their round robin pool and then won both their quarterfinal and semifinal matches to advance to the final. Facing Dodds and Mouat once again, the pair lost 6–4 and finished in second. The following year, Jackson and McFadzean returned to the Scottish championship and bettered their performance. After a 5–2 round robin record, the pair won in the quarters and semis to reach their second straight final. They then beat Lisa Davie and Mark Watt 9–3 to claim the Scottish title and a trip to the 2024 World Mixed Doubles Curling Championship. At Worlds, the team had a slow start, losing three of their first five games before winning four straight to secure a spot in the playoff round. They then lost to Switzerland's Briar Schwaller-Hürlimann and Yannick Schwaller, placing fifth.

== Personal life ==
McFadzean attended Perth High School. He is currently the Woodhead of Mailer Farm.

== Teams ==
Season	Skip	Third	Second	Lead	Alternate
2014–15	Graeme Connal	Callum Kinnear	Duncan McFadzean	Kerr Sands	
2016–17	Ross Whyte	Callum Kinnear	Ryan McCormack	Duncan McFadzean	
2017–18	Callum Kinnear	Duncan McFadzean	Ryan McCormack	Matthew McKenzie	
2018–19	Ross Whyte	Duncan McFadzean	James Craik	Euan Kyle	Ryan McCormack (WJCC)
2019–20	Ross Whyte	Robin Brydone	Duncan McFadzean	Euan Kyle	
2020–21	Ross Whyte	Robin Brydone	Duncan McFadzean	Euan Kyle	
2021–22	Ross Whyte	Robin Brydone	Duncan McFadzean	Euan Kyle	Greg Drummond (SMCC)
2022–23	Ross Whyte (Fourth)	Robin Brydone (Skip)	Duncan McFadzean	Euan Kyle	
2023–24	Ross Whyte	Robin Brydone	Duncan McFadzean	Euan Kyle	
2024–25	Ross Whyte	Robin Brydone	Duncan McFadzean	Euan Kyle	
2025–26	Ross Whyte	Robin Brydone	Craig Waddell	Euan Kyle	Duncan McFadzean
