= Angus Bryce =

Scottish curler (born 2002)

- Curler
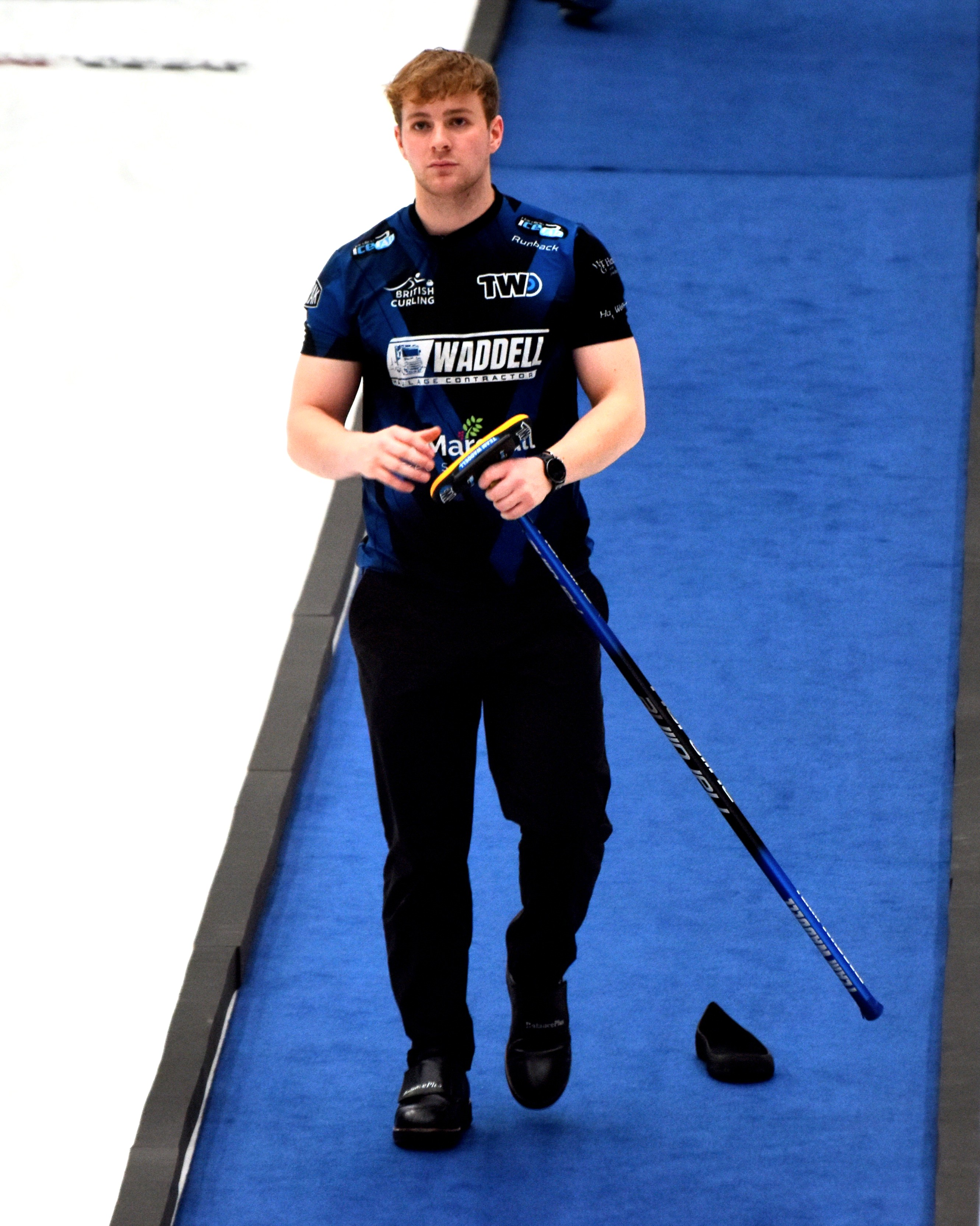
- Bryce at the 2026 Players' Championship.
- Born: 11 May 2002 (age 24); Livingston, Scotland

Team
- Curling club: Kelso CC, Kelso, SCO
- Skip: Kyle Waddell
- Third: Mark Watt
- Second: Angus Bryce
- Lead: Blair Haswell
- Mixed doubles partner: Katie McMillan

Curling career
- Member Association: Scotland; Great Britain
- World Mixed Doubles Championship: 1 (2026)
Medal record
Men's Curling
Representing Great Britain
World University Games
Gold medal – first place	2023 Saranac Lake
Representing Scotland
World Junior Championships
Gold medal – first place	2022 Jönköping
Bronze medal – third place	2020 Krasnoyarsk
Scottish Men's Championship
Silver medal – second place	2023 Dumfries
Silver medal – second place	2024 Dumfries
Silver medal – second place	2026 Aberdeen
Bronze medal – third place	2022 Dumfries
Bronze medal – third place	2025 Dumfries
Scottish Mixed Doubles Championship
Gold medal – first place	2026 Aberdeen
Bronze medal – third place	2025 Aberdeen

Angus Bryce (born 11 May 2002 in Livingston) is a Scottish curler from Kelso. He currently plays second on Team Kyle Waddell. Playing for James Craik, Bryce won gold at the 2022 World Junior Curling Championships and 2023 Winter World University Games and bronze at the 2020 World Junior Curling Championships. He also won a gold medal at the 2019 European Youth Olympic Winter Festival.

== Career ==
=== 2016–2022 ===
At just 14 years old, Bryce and his team, skipped by Cameron McNay, reached the final of the 2016 Scottish Junior Curling Championships. After going 5–2 through the round robin, the young team defeated Ross Whyte 7–4 in the semifinal before losing to Bruce Mouat 8–3 in the championship game. The following year, the team again reached the playoffs, this time being defeated by Whyte in the semifinal game. Two years later, Bryce made his international debut at the 2019 European Youth Olympic Winter Festival, playing second on the British team that also included Hamish Gallacher, Robyn Munro and Inca Maguire. At the festival, the team went an undefeated 6–0 to reach the playoffs. They then defeated Poland in the semifinal before beating Switzerland in the final to claim the gold medal.

After failing to reach the playoffs at the national championship for two years in a row, Bryce joined the Hamish Gallacher rink at second. The team, including third Scott Hyslop and lead Jack Carrick went 6–1 at the 2020 Scottish junior championship, finishing tied for first with James Craik. After being beaten by Craik in the 1 vs. 2 game, Team Gallacher beat Callum Kinnear in the semifinal to reach the final. There, they were again defeated by Craik to finish with the silver medal. After the event, Bryce was invited to join Team Craik as their alternate at the 2020 World Junior Curling Championships in Krasnoyarsk, Russia. There, the Scottish team of Craik, Mark Watt, Blair Haswell, Niall Ryder and Bryce topped the round robin with a 7–2 record, earning themselves a spot in the playoffs. The team then lost to Switzerland's Marco Hösli 9–6 in the semifinal before defeating Germany's Sixten Totzek 6–5 to capture the bronze medal.

Bryce joined Craik's team full-time at third for the 2021–22 season. After being delayed to the fall due to the COVID-19 pandemic in Scotland, the team won the Scottish junior title in November 2021, winning all ten of their games en route to claiming the title. In preparation for the 2022 World Junior Curling Championships in May, the team competed in the 2022 Scottish Curling Championships. There, they finished 6–4 through the double round robin, finishing third and advancing to the playoffs. They then lost 7–2 to eventual champion Ross Paterson in the semifinal, earning the bronze medal. Entering the world junior championship as the highest ranked team, the team finished with an 8–1 round robin record, in sole first-place possession. This time, the team advanced through the semifinal game by defeating Norway's Grunde Buraas 7–5. They then claimed the gold medal with a dominant 7–1 win over Germany's Benjamin Kapp.

=== 2022–present ===
Bryce and Craik reunited with former teammates Mark Watt and Blair Haswell for the 2022–23 season, forming a team to represent Great Britain at the 2023 Winter World University Games. On the European tour, the team found success, reaching the semifinals of the 2022 Oslo Cup and 2023 Mercure Perth Masters and the quarterfinals of four other events. This set the team up for a dominant run at the University Games, going 8–1 through the round robin and beating Canada's Dalhousie University team (skipped by Owen Purcell) in the semifinal to advance to the final. There, they beat the United States' Daniel Casper to claim the gold medal, becoming the second British men's team to do so. After the championship, the team returned home to the Scottish men's championship where they again reached the playoffs with a 5–2 record in the round robin. They then beat Ross Whyte in the semifinal before coming up short to Bruce Mouat in the final, who went on to win the 2023 World Men's Curling Championship.

Now focused solely on men's play, Team Craik began the 2023–24 season with back-to-back playoff finishes at the 2023 Baden Masters and the 2023 Euro Super Series, losing out to Joël Retornaz and Bruce Mouat respectively. In October, the team went undefeated to win the Grand Prix Bern Inter, Bryce's first tour victory. With the points they accumulated throughout the 2022–23 and start of the 2023–24 season, the team rose high enough in the ranks to qualify for the 2023 National Grand Slam event. They previously competed in the 2023 Tour Challenge Tier 2 event, however, lost in the quarterfinals to Mike McEwen. At the National, the team went 2–2 in the round robin, just enough to squeak into the playoff round. They were then defeated by Yannick Schwaller 6–5 in the quarterfinals. Team Craik also had enough points to play in the next two Slams, the 2023 Masters and the 2024 Canadian Open. After missing the playoffs at the Masters, the team again went 2–2 at the Canadian Open and had a good enough draw total to reach the playoffs. This time, it was Mouat who took them out in the quarterfinal round by a 5–4 score. In February, the team had another strong showing at the national men's championship, going 6–2 in the round robin and qualifying for the 1 vs. 2 game. There, they lost 7–3 to Team Whyte but rebounded with a 9–1 win over Team Mouat to reach the final. There, they again came up short to Whyte, losing 7–6. The team ended their season at the 2024 Players' Championship Slam where they went 1–4.

Team Craik reached the playoffs at the first Slam of the 2024–25 season, losing to Team Mouat in the quarterfinals of the 2024 Tour Challenge. They also made the playoffs at the 2024 Euro Super Series and the Grand Prix Bern Inter, losing out in the quarterfinals and semifinals respectively. They had less success at the next two Slams, missing the playoffs at both the 2024 Canadian Open and the 2024 National. With only three playoff appearances on tour, they fell out of Slam contention by the end of the first half of the season. In the new year, they finished third through the round robin of the Scottish championship with a 6–2 record. They then lost in the semifinal to Team Whyte who went on to win the event. In February, they won their first event by going undefeated to claim the Sun City Cup. The team ended their season at the Aberdeen International Curling Championship where they lost in the final to Cameron Bryce.

In the off season, British Curling shuffled around their men's lineups with Bryce, Haswell and Watt forming a new team with Kyle and Craig Waddell for the 2025–26 season.

== Personal life ==
Bryce is employed at Bryce Suma Post Drivers. He previously attended Open University and Kelso High School, winning the Scottish Schools Curling Championship in 2019. His siblings Cameron and Amy are previous Scottish junior champions. He is in a relationship with American curler Sydney Mullaney.

== Teams ==
Season	Skip	Third	Second	Lead	Alternate
2014–15	Cameron McNay	Fin Campbell	Ryan McCormack	Angus Bryce	
2015–16	Cameron McNay	Fin Campbell	Ryan McCormack	Angus Bryce	
2016–17	Cameron McNay	James Baird	Fin Campbell	Angus Bryce	
2017–18	James Craik	Angus Bryce	Mark Watt	Niall Ryder	
2018–19	Angus Bryce	Mark Watt	Mark Taylor	George Smith	
2019–20	Hamish Gallacher	Scott Hyslop	Angus Bryce	Jack Carrick	
2020–21	Hamish Gallacher	Scott Hyslop	Angus Bryce	Jack Carrick	
2021–22	James Craik	Angus Bryce	Scott Hyslop	Niall Ryder	Jack Carrick
2022–23	James Craik	Mark Watt	Angus Bryce	Blair Haswell	Jack Carrick
2023–24	James Craik	Mark Watt	Angus Bryce	Blair Haswell	
2024–25	James Craik	Mark Watt	Angus Bryce	Blair Haswell	
2025–26	Kyle Waddell	Mark Watt	Angus Bryce	Blair Haswell	
2026–27	Kyle Waddell	Mark Watt	Angus Bryce	Blair Haswell	
