= Mark Watt (curler) =

Scottish curler (born 1999)

- Curler
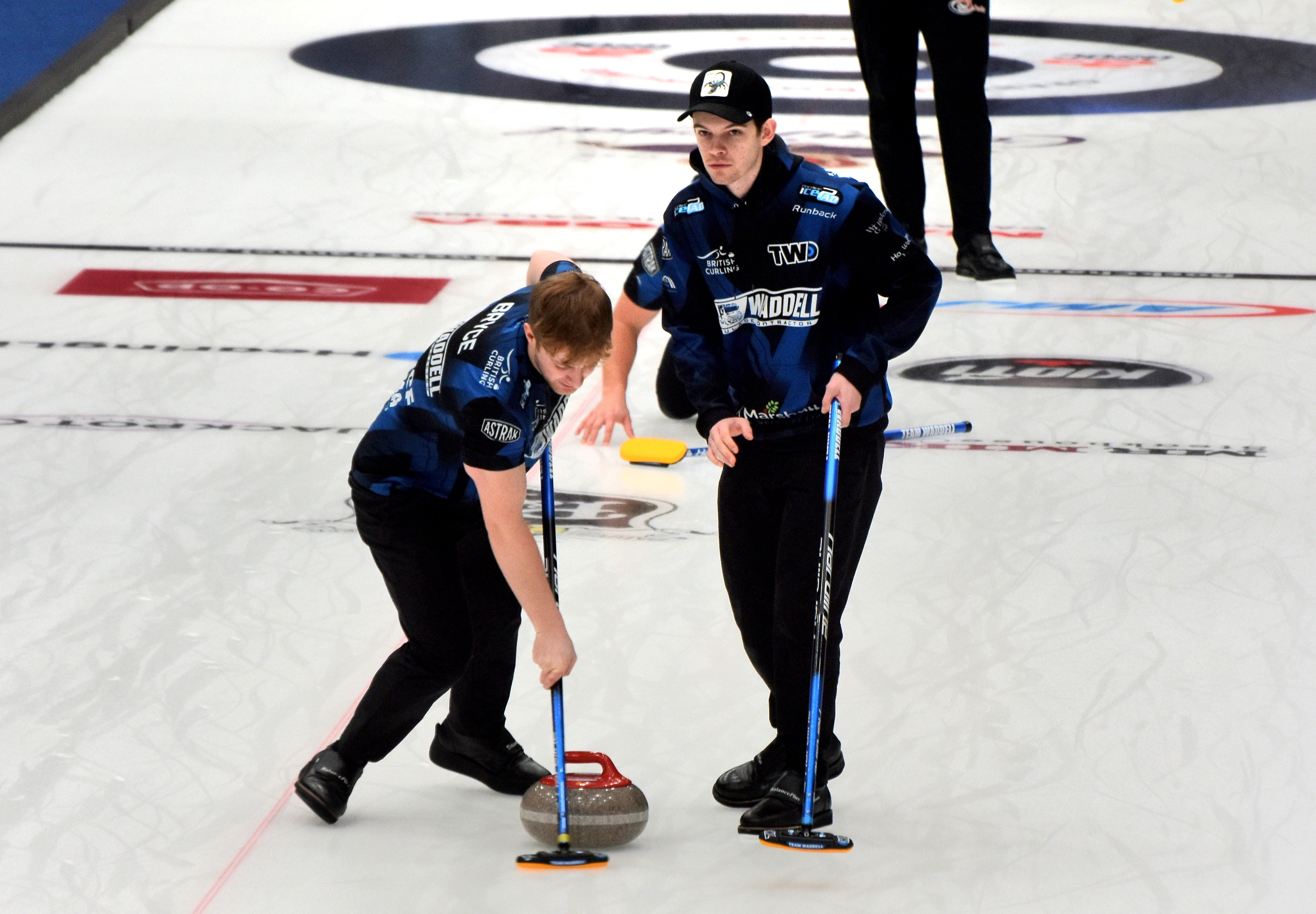
- Watt (right) at the 2026 Players' Championship.
- Born: 31 October 1999 (age 27); Stirling, Scotland

Team
- Curling club: Dunning CC, Perth, SCO
- Skip: Kyle Waddell
- Third: Mark Watt
- Second: Angus Bryce
- Lead: Blair Haswell
- Mixed doubles partner: Lisa Davie

Curling career
- Member Association: Scotland; Great Britain
Medal record
Men's curling
Representing Great Britain
World University Games
Gold medal – first place	2023 Saranac Lake
Representing Scotland
World Junior Championships
Bronze medal – third place	2020 Krasnoyarsk
Scottish Men's Championship
Silver medal – second place	2023 Dumfries
Silver medal – second place	2024 Dumfries
Silver medal – second place	2026 Aberdeen
Bronze medal – third place	2025 Dumfries
Scottish Mixed Doubles Championship
Silver medal – second place	2024 Perth
Silver medal – second place	2026 Aberdeen
Bronze medal – third place	2022 Perth
Bronze medal – third place	2025 Aberdeen

Mark Watt (born 31 October 1999 in Stirling) is a Scottish curler from Auchterarder. He currently plays third on Team Kyle Waddell. Playing for James Craik, Watt won gold at the 2023 Winter World University Games and bronze at the 2020 World Junior Curling Championships.

== Career ==
=== Juniors ===
Watt won the Scottish Junior Curling Championships in 2020, playing third for James Craik. The team also included second Blair Haswell and lead Niall Ryder. This earned the rink the right to represent Scotland at the 2020 World Junior Curling Championships, in Krasnoyarsk, Russia. There, they topped the round robin with a 7–2 record, earning themselves a spot in the playoffs. The team then lost to Switzerland's Marco Hösli 9–6 in the semifinal before defeating Germany's Sixten Totzek 6–5 to capture the bronze medal. With Watt aging out of juniors following the cancelled 2020–21 season, he created a new team with Gregor Cannon, Haswell and Gavin Barr. This lineup saw limited success, only reaching the playoffs in two of seven World Curling Tour events and finishing with a 4–6 record at the 2022 Scottish Curling Championships.

=== Men's ===
Watt and Haswell reunited with former teammates Craik and Angus Bryce for the 2022–23 season, forming a team to represent Great Britain at the 2023 Winter World University Games. On the European tour, the team found success, reaching the semifinals of the 2022 Oslo Cup and 2023 Mercure Perth Masters and the quarterfinals of four other events. This set the team up for a dominant run at the University Games, going 8–1 through the round robin and beating Canada's Dalhousie University team (skipped by Owen Purcell) in the semifinal to advance to the final. There, they beat the United States' Daniel Casper to claim the gold medal, becoming the second British men's team to do so. After the championship, the team returned home to the Scottish men's championship where they reached the playoffs with a 5–2 record in the round robin. They then beat Ross Whyte in the semifinal before coming up short to Bruce Mouat in the final, who went on to win the 2023 World Men's Curling Championship.

Now focused solely on men's play, Team Craik began the 2023–24 season with back-to-back playoff finishes at the 2023 Baden Masters and the 2023 Euro Super Series, losing out to Joël Retornaz and Bruce Mouat respectively. In October, the team went undefeated to win the Grand Prix Bern Inter, Watt's first tour victory. With the points they accumulated throughout the 2022–23 and start of the 2023–24 season, the team rose high enough in the ranks to qualify for the 2023 National Grand Slam event. They previously competed in the 2023 Tour Challenge Tier 2 event, however, lost in the quarterfinals to Mike McEwen. At the National, the team went 2–2 in the round robin, just enough to squeak into the playoff round. They were then defeated by Yannick Schwaller 6–5 in the quarterfinals. Team Craik also had enough points to play in the next two Slams, the 2023 Masters and the 2024 Canadian Open. After missing the playoffs at the Masters, the team again went 2–2 at the Canadian Open and had a good enough draw total to reach the playoffs. This time, it was Mouat who took them out in the quarterfinal round by a 5–4 score. In February, the team had another strong showing at the national men's championship, going 6–2 in the round robin and qualifying for the 1 vs. 2 game. There, they lost 7–3 to Team Whyte but rebounded with a 9–1 win over Team Mouat to reach the final. There, they again came up short to Whyte, losing 7–6. The team ended their season at the 2024 Players' Championship Slam where they went 1–4.

Team Craik reached the playoffs at the first Slam of the 2024–25 season, losing to Team Mouat in the quarterfinals of the 2024 Tour Challenge. They also made the playoffs at the 2024 Euro Super Series and the Grand Prix Bern Inter, losing out in the quarterfinals and semifinals respectively. They had less success at the next two Slams, missing the playoffs at both the 2024 Canadian Open and the 2024 National. With only three playoff appearances on tour, they fell out of Slam contention by the end of the first half of the season. In the new year, they finished third through the round robin of the Scottish championship with a 6–2 record. They then lost in the semifinal to Team Whyte who went on to win the event. In February, they won their first event by going undefeated to claim the Sun City Cup. The team ended their season at the Aberdeen International Curling Championship where they lost in the final to Cameron Bryce.

In the off season, British Curling shuffled around their men's lineups with Watt, Bryce and Haswell forming a new team with Kyle and Craig Waddell for the 2025–26 season.

=== Mixed doubles ===
Watt played in his first Scottish Mixed Doubles Curling Championship in 2022 with partner Katie McMillan. There, the pair finished 4–1 through the round robin, advancing to the playoffs where they beat Sophie Sinclair and Ross Whyte in the quarterfinals. They then lost to Jennifer Dodds and Bruce Mouat in the semifinals, settling for third. The following year, Watt paired with Hannah Farries, missing the playoffs with a 2–3 record.

In 2024, Watt again played in the national championship, teaming up with Lisa Davie to reach the playoffs with a 5–1 record. In the quarterfinals, Davie and Watt beat Fay Henderson and Euan Kyle 7–5 before going on to defeat Rebecca Morrison and Kyle Waddell 8–3 in the semifinals. This advanced them to the final where they lost 9–3 to Sophie Jackson and Duncan McFadzean, earning the silver medal from the championship. The next season, Davie and Watt went 3–1 through the qualifying round, earning a direct bye to the semifinals. They were then eliminated by Sophie Sinclair and Robin Brydone in an 8–7 game, finishing third. In 2026, the pair again had a strong run at the championship, finishing undefeated through the round robin and winning the semifinal to qualify for another final. There, they lost to each of their respective teammates Angus Bryce and Katie McMillan 9–6, settling for silver.

== Personal life ==
Watt works at the Perth Trophy Shop. He previously studied at Open University. His father Iain Watt won silver at the 1990 World Junior Curling Championships and his sister Laura Watt won gold at the 2023 World Junior Curling Championships.

== Teams ==
Season	Skip	Third	Second	Lead	Alternate
2016–17	James Craik	Mark Watt	Matthew McKenzie	Niall Ryder	
2017–18	James Craik	Angus Bryce	Mark Watt	Niall Ryder	
2018–19	Angus Bryce	Mark Watt	Mark Taylor	George Smith	
2019–20	James Craik	Mark Watt	Blair Haswell	Niall Ryder	
2020–21	James Craik	Mark Watt	Blair Haswell	Niall Ryder	
2021–22	Mark Watt	Gregor Cannon	Blair Haswell	Gavin Barr	
2022–23	James Craik	Mark Watt	Angus Bryce	Blair Haswell	Jack Carrick
2023–24	James Craik	Mark Watt	Angus Bryce	Blair Haswell	
2024–25	James Craik	Mark Watt	Angus Bryce	Blair Haswell	
2025–26	Kyle Waddell	Mark Watt	Angus Bryce	Blair Haswell	
2026–27	Kyle Waddell	Mark Watt	Angus Bryce	Blair Haswell	
