= Magnus Ramsfjell =

Norwegian curler (born 1997)

- Curler
- Born: 17 July 1997 (age 29); Tønsberg, Norway

Team
- Curling club: Trondheim CK, Trondheim, NOR
- Skip: Magnus Ramsfjell
- Third: Steffen Walstad
- Second: Bendik Ramsfjell
- Lead: Mathias Brænden

Curling career
- Member Association: Norway
- World Championship: 6 (2019, 2022, 2023, 2024, 2025, 2026)
- World Mixed Doubles Championship: 2 (2018, 2022)
- European Championship: 4 (2023, 2024, 2025, 2026)
- Olympic: 1 (2026)
Medal record
Curling
Representing Norway
European Championships
Bronze medal – third place	2024 Lohja
World Junior Championships
Bronze medal – third place	2017 Pyeongchang
Winter Universiade
Gold medal – first place	2019 Krasnoyarsk
Norwegian Men's Championships
Gold medal – first place	2019 Haugesund
Gold medal – first place	2020 Oslo
Gold medal – first place	2022 Trondheim
Gold medal – first place	2023 Oppdal
Gold medal – first place	2026 Lillehammer
Silver medal – second place	2025 Halden
Bronze medal – third place	2017 Lillehammer
Bronze medal – third place	2018 Lillehammer
Bronze medal – third place	2024 Oslo

Magnus Ramsfjell (born 17 July 1997 in Tønsberg) is a Norwegian curler from Trondheim.

== Career ==
=== Juniors ===
Ramsfjell was the skip of the Norwegian junior men's team in four straight World Junior Curling Championships from 2016 to 2019. At the 2016 World Junior Curling Championships, Ramsfjell led his team of Bendik Ramsfjell, Magnus Vågberg, Elias Høstmælingen and Eskil Vintervold to a 5-4 round robin record, missing the playoffs. At the 2017 World Junior Curling Championships, his team improved to a 6-3 round robin record, which put them in a tiebreaker game against Canada's Tyler Tardi rink for the final playoff spot. They beat Canada in the tiebreaker game, but lost to Scotland's Cameron Bryce in the 3 vs. 4 game. This put them in the bronze medal game, where they faced Scotland again. This time, they would beat the Scots to claim the bronze medal.

At the 2018 World Junior Curling Championships, Ramsfjell would skip a new team which consisted of Kristian Foss, Michael Mellemseter, Andreas Hårstad and Jørgen Myran. This team would be less successful, finishing with a 4-5 record, missing the playoffs. The team played in the 2019 World Junior Curling Championships (with Foss off the team). The team squeaked into the playoffs with a 6-3 record. However, they lost to Canada (Tardi) in the semifinal and Scotland (Ross Whyte) in the bronze medal game to finish fourth.

A month after the 2019 World Juniors, Ramsfjell skipped Team Norway at the 2019 Winter Universiade. His team of Martin Sesaker, Bendik Ramsfjell and Gaute Nepstad went on to win the gold medal.

=== Men's ===
Later that month, Ramsfjell and his junior rink would compete at the 2019 World Men's Curling Championship, finishing 12th with a 2-10 record. They qualified by upsetting former World Champion Thomas Ulsrud in the Norwegian championship. Ramsfjell won his second Norwegian championship in 2020 with Torger Nergård, Sesaker, and Bendik Ramsfjell.

The Ramsfjell Universiade championship rink re-united for the 2021–22 curling season, and won the 2022 Norwegian Men's Curling Championship. The team was chosen to represent Norway at the 2022 World Men's Curling Championship, where they finished in 10th with a 5–7 record. That season, the team also won the 2021 Prague Classic World Curling Tour event.

During the 2022–23 curling season, the team won the Norwegian men's championship again and won the 2022 Curling Masters Champéry World Curling Tour event. They also played in the 2022 Masters and 2023 Canadian Open Grand Slam of Curling events. They made it to the semifinals of the Masters and failed to qualify for the playoffs in the Canadian Open. The team was chosen to represent Norway once again at the 2023 World Men's Curling Championship, where they went 10–2 in the round robin. This put the team in the playoffs, where they lost to Italy (skipped by Joël Retornaz) in the qualification game. The following week, the team played in the 2023 Players' Championship, where they went 2–3, missing the playoffs. Ramsfjell would win his first men's international medal at the 2024 European Curling Championships, where they would finish round-robin play with a 6–3 record and after losing in the semifinals, would beat Switzerland's Yannick Schwaller 7–4 to win the bronze medal.

Team Ramsfjell would represent Norway at the 2026 Winter Olympics, where they would qualify for the playoffs after finishing round robin with a 5–4 record. However, they would lose to Canada's Brad Jacobs in the semifinals and Switzerland's Yannick Schwaller 9–1 in the bronze medal game to finish in 4th place.

=== Mixed doubles ===
Outside of men's curling, Ramsfjell and his sister Maia represented Norway at the 2018 World Mixed Doubles Curling Championship. After going 7-0 in group play, they lost their first playoff game to Russia, and were eliminated. The pair also represented Norway at the 2022 World Mixed Doubles Curling Championship. After going 7–2 in pool play, they then beat Canada in the qualification game, before losing to Switzerland in the semifinals. They then lost to Germany in the bronze medal game, settling for fourth place.

== Personal life ==
As of 2019, Ramsfjell was a masters student in electrical engineering. He attended the Norwegian University of Science and Technology. Ramsfjell is the son of three-time world champion and Olympic bronze medalist Eigil Ramsfjell.

== Grand Slam record ==
Key
C	Champion
F	Lost in Final
SF	Lost in Semifinal
QF	Lost in Quarterfinals
R16	Lost in the round of 16
Q	Did not advance to playoffs
T2	Played in Tier 2 event
DNP	Did not participate in event
N/A	Not a Grand Slam event that season

Event	2022–23	2023–24	2024–25	2025–26	2026–27
Invitational	DNP	Q	T2	DNP	F
Masters	SF	QF	Q	QF	DNP
National	DNP	DNP	Q	DNP	DNP
Open	Q	Q	DNP	T2	DNP
Players'	Q	DNP	DNP	DNP	
