= 2025 Stu Sells Oakville Tankard =

- Host city: Oakville, Ontario
- Arena: Oakville Curling Club
- Dates: September 5–8
- Men's winner: (Scotland) Team Whyte
- Curling club: The Peak, Stirling
- Skip: Ross Whyte
- Third: Robin Brydone
- Second: Craig Waddell
- Lead: Euan Kyle
- Coach: Alistair Scott
- Finalist: (United States) Korey Dropkin
- Women's winner: (South Korea) Team Ha
- Curling club: Chuncheon CC, Chuncheon
- Skip: Ha Seung-youn
- Third: Kim Hye-rin
- Second: Yang Tae-i
- Lead: Kim Su-jin
- Alternate: Park Seo-jin
- Coach: Lee Sung-jun
- Finalist: (Japan) Team Tabata

The 2025 Stu Sells Oakville Tankard was held from September 5 to 8 at the Oakville Curling Club in Oakville, Ontario. The event was held in a triple knockout format with a purse of $30,000 on both the men's and women's sides. It was the first Stu Sells sponsored event held as part of the 2025–26 season.

Scotland's Team Ross Whyte dominated the men's event, winning all six of their games en route to claiming the championship 7–3 over the United States' Korey Dropkin. After qualifying through the A side, the team beat Ontario's Scott Howard in the quarterfinals and Sweden's Niklas Edin in the semifinals. Team Dropkin, meanwhile, qualified through the C side before eliminating Ontario's John Epping and South Korea's Lee Jae-beom. Scotland's Kyle Waddell and Ontario's Sam Mooibroek both also qualified before losing out in the quarterfinals. It was the first time Team Whyte won the event after losing the final in 2023 to Team Bruce Mouat.

On the women's side, South Korea's Ha Seung-youn won the title for a second time by scoring three in the eighth end to beat Japan's Momoha Tabata 6–5. Team Ha also won all of their games to claim the title, taking down Ontario's Hollie Duncan and Sweden's Isabella Wranå in their playoff games. Team Tabata qualified through the B side before beating the Olympic qualified rinks of Madeleine Dupont (Denmark) and Rebecca Morrison (Great Britain). Switzerland's Xenia Schwaller and Scotland's Fay Henderson both reached the playoff round as well.

== Men ==
=== Teams ===
The teams are listed as follows:

Skip	Third	Second	Lead	Alternate	Locale
Korey Dropkin	Thomas Howell	Andrew Stopera	Mark Fenner		(United States) Duluth, Minnesota
Niklas Edin	Oskar Eriksson	Rasmus Wranå	Christoffer Sundgren		Karlstad, Sweden
John Epping	Jacob Horgan	Tanner Horgan	Ian McMillan		Sudbury, Ontario
Pat Ferris	Travis Fanset	Rob Ainsley	Scott Clinton		Grimsby, Ontario
Mike Fournier	Charlie Richard	Punit Sthankiya	Graeme Robson		Toronto, Ontario
Daniel Hocevar	Zander Elmes	Joel Matthews	Daniel Del Conte		Toronto, Ontario
Scott Howard	Mat Camm	Jason Camm	Scott Chadwick		Navan, Ontario
Mark Kean	Brady Lumley	Matthew Garner	Spencer Dunlop		Woodstock, Ontario
Lee Jae-beom	Lee Ki-jeong	Kim Min-woo	Kim Jeong-min		Seoul, South Korea
Calan MacIsaac	Nathan Gray	Owain Fisher	Christopher McCurdy	Nick Mosher	Truro, Nova Scotia
Sam Mooibroek	Ryan Wiebe	Scott Mitchell	Nathan Steele		Whitby, Ontario
Pierre-Luc Morissette	Robert Desjardins	Stewart Yaxley	Thierry Fournier		Quebec City, Quebec
Owen Purcell	Luke Saunders	Gavin Lydiate	Ryan Abraham		Halifax, Nova Scotia
Kyle Waddell	Mark Watt	Angus Bryce	Blair Haswell		Hamilton, Scotland
Ross Whyte	Robin Brydone	Craig Waddell (Note: Alternate Craig Waddell spared for Duncan McFadzean.)	Euan Kyle		Stirling, Scotland
Xu Xiaoming	Fei Xueqing	Li Zhichao	Xu Jingtao	Yang Bohao	Beijing, China

=== Knockout Brackets ===
==== A Event ====
First Knockout				Qualifier 1
(Scotland) Ross Whyte	3
(Nova Scotia) Calan MacIsaac	1	(Scotland) Ross Whyte	7
(Ontario) Scott Howard	6	(Ontario) Scott Howard	2
(Ontario) Mark Kean	2			(Scotland) Ross Whyte	6
(Sweden) Niklas Edin	7			(Sweden) Niklas Edin	3
(Ontario) Mike Fournier	1	(Sweden) Niklas Edin	7
(China) Xu Xiaoming	6	(South Korea) Lee Jae-beom	6
(South Korea) Lee Jae-beom	7

First Knockout				Qualifier 2
(Ontario) John Epping	12
(Quebec) Pierre-Luc Morissette	1	(Ontario) John Epping	8
(Ontario) Sam Mooibroek	7	(Ontario) Sam Mooibroek	3
(Nova Scotia) Owen Purcell	2			(Ontario) John Epping	6
(United States) Korey Dropkin	4			(United States) Korey Dropkin	5
(Ontario) Pat Ferris	3	(United States) Korey Dropkin	8
(Scotland) Kyle Waddell	8	(Scotland) Kyle Waddell	4
(Ontario) Daniel Hocevar	1

==== B Event ====
Second Knockout				Qualifier 3
		(South Korea) Lee Jae-beom	5
(Nova Scotia) Calan MacIsaac	6	(Ontario) Mark Kean	4
(Ontario) Mark Kean	9			(South Korea) Lee Jae-beom	6
				(United States) Korey Dropkin	3

Second Knockout	Qualifier 4
(Ontario) Sam Mooibroek	6
(Ontario) Mike Fournier	5	(China) Xu Xiaoming	4
(China) Xu Xiaoming	9	(Ontario) Sam Mooibroek	4
(Scotland) Kyle Waddell	5
(Scotland) Kyle Waddell	8
(Quebec) Pierre-Luc Morissette	6	(Nova Scotia) Owen Purcell	2
(Nova Scotia) Owen Purcell	7

Second Knockout				Qualifier 5
		(Ontario) Scott Howard	8
(Ontario) Pat Ferris	7	(Ontario) Pat Ferris	2
(Ontario) Daniel Hocevar	6			(Ontario) Scott Howard	3
				(Sweden) Niklas Edin	6

==== C Event ====
Third Knockout				Qualifier 6
		(Ontario) Pat Ferris	7
(Nova Scotia) Calan MacIsaac	7	(Nova Scotia) Calan MacIsaac	10
(Ontario) Mike Fournier	3			(Nova Scotia) Calan MacIsaac	3
				(Ontario) Sam Mooibroek	8

Third Knockout				Qualifier 7
		(Ontario) Mark Kean	8
(Quebec) Pierre-Luc Morissette	6	(Quebec) Pierre-Luc Morissette	3
(Ontario) Daniel Hocevar	5			(Ontario) Mark Kean	2
				(United States) Korey Dropkin	8

Third Knockout		Qualifier 8
(China) Xu Xiaoming	2
(Nova Scotia) Owen Purcell	5	(Nova Scotia) Owen Purcell	3
		(Ontario) Scott Howard	4

=== Knockout Results ===
All draw times are listed in Eastern Time (UTC−04:00).

==== Draw 3 ====
Friday, September 5, 3:15 pm

Sheet 1	1	2	3	4	5	6	7	8	Final
(Ontario) Sam Mooibroek 🔨	3	0	0	2	0	1	1	X	7
(Nova Scotia) Owen Purcell	0	1	0	0	1	0	0	X	2

Sheet 2	1	2	3	4	5	6	7	8	Final
(China) Xu Xiaoming	0	1	0	0	2	0	2	1	6
(South Korea) Lee Jae-beom 🔨	2	0	1	3	0	1	0	0	7

Sheet 3	1	2	3	4	5	6	7	8	Final
(Scotland) Ross Whyte 🔨	1	0	0	1	0	1	0	X	3
(Nova Scotia) Calan MacIsaac	0	0	0	0	1	0	0	X	1

Sheet 4	1	2	3	4	5	6	7	8	Final
(Sweden) Niklas Edin 🔨	1	2	0	0	4	X	X	X	7
(Ontario) Mike Fournier	0	0	1	0	0	X	X	X	1

Sheet 5	1	2	3	4	5	6	7	8	Final
(United States) Korey Dropkin	0	0	0	1	2	0	0	1	4
(Ontario) Pat Ferris 🔨	0	0	0	0	0	2	1	0	3

Sheet 6	1	2	3	4	5	6	7	8	Final
(Ontario) John Epping	3	3	0	4	1	1	X	X	12
(Quebec) Pierre-Luc Morissette 🔨	0	0	1	0	0	0	X	X	1

Sheet 7	1	2	3	4	5	6	7	8	Final
(Scotland) Kyle Waddell	1	2	0	2	3	X	X	X	8
(Ontario) Daniel Hocevar 🔨	0	0	1	0	0	X	X	X	1

Sheet 8	1	2	3	4	5	6	7	8	Final
(Ontario) Scott Howard 🔨	2	0	1	0	0	1	0	2	6
(Ontario) Mark Kean	0	1	0	0	0	0	1	0	2

==== Draw 5 ====
Friday, September 5, 9:30 pm

Sheet 1	1	2	3	4	5	6	7	8	Final
(United States) Korey Dropkin	0	0	1	1	0	3	2	1	8
(Scotland) Kyle Waddell 🔨	0	3	0	0	1	0	0	0	4

Sheet 2	1	2	3	4	5	6	7	8	Final
(Scotland) Ross Whyte 🔨	1	0	1	0	0	5	X	X	7
(Ontario) Scott Howard	0	1	0	0	1	0	X	X	2

Sheet 3	1	2	3	4	5	6	7	8	Final
(Sweden) Niklas Edin	0	1	0	1	0	3	0	2	7
(South Korea) Lee Jae-beom 🔨	2	0	1	0	1	0	2	0	6

Sheet 4	1	2	3	4	5	6	7	8	Final
(Ontario) John Epping	1	0	1	0	6	X	X	X	8
(Ontario) Sam Mooibroek 🔨	0	1	0	2	0	X	X	X	3

==== Draw 6 ====
Saturday, September 6, 9:00 am

Sheet 5	1	2	3	4	5	6	7	8	Final
(Nova Scotia) Calan MacIsaac	0	2	0	2	0	2	0	0	6
(Ontario) Mark Kean 🔨	2	0	3	0	2	0	1	1	9

Sheet 6	1	2	3	4	5	6	7	8	Final
(Ontario) Mike Fournier 🔨	0	1	0	2	0	2	0	X	5
(China) Xu Xiaoming	1	0	2	0	3	0	3	X	9

Sheet 7	1	2	3	4	5	6	7	8	Final
(Quebec) Pierre-Luc Morissette	0	0	1	0	2	0	3	0	6
(Nova Scotia) Owen Purcell 🔨	0	1	0	1	0	2	0	3	7

Sheet 8	1	2	3	4	5	6	7	8	9	Final
(Ontario) Pat Ferris 🔨	1	0	1	0	2	2	0	0	1	7
(Ontario) Daniel Hocevar	0	2	0	1	0	0	1	2	0	6

==== Draw 7 ====
Saturday, September 6, 12:30 pm

Sheet 6	1	2	3	4	5	6	7	8	Final
(Scotland) Ross Whyte	0	2	0	2	0	2	0	X	6
(Sweden) Niklas Edin 🔨	1	0	1	0	1	0	0	X	3

Sheet 7	1	2	3	4	5	6	7	8	Final
(Ontario) John Epping 🔨	1	0	0	0	3	0	2	0	6
(United States) Korey Dropkin	0	2	0	1	0	1	0	1	5

==== Draw 8 ====
Saturday, September 6, 3:15 pm

Sheet 2	1	2	3	4	5	6	7	8	Final
(Scotland) Kyle Waddell 🔨	2	0	0	2	0	4	X	X	8
(Nova Scotia) Owen Purcell	0	1	0	0	1	0	X	X	2

Sheet 3	1	2	3	4	5	6	7	8	Final
(Ontario) Scott Howard	0	2	3	0	3	X	X	X	8
(Ontario) Pat Ferris 🔨	1	0	0	1	0	X	X	X	2

Sheet 4	1	2	3	4	5	6	7	8	Final
(South Korea) Lee Jae-beom 🔨	0	1	0	2	0	1	0	1	5
(Ontario) Mark Kean	1	0	1	0	0	0	2	0	4

Sheet 5	1	2	3	4	5	6	7	8	Final
(Ontario) Sam Mooibroek	0	2	1	0	0	1	0	2	6
(China) Xu Xiaoming 🔨	0	0	0	2	0	0	2	0	4

==== Draw 9 ====
Saturday, September 6, 7:00 pm

Sheet 2	1	2	3	4	5	6	7	8	Final
(Nova Scotia) Calan MacIsaac 🔨	0	3	0	2	2	0	X	X	7
(Ontario) Mike Fournier	1	0	1	0	0	1	X	X	3

Sheet 4	1	2	3	4	5	6	7	8	Final
(Quebec) Pierre-Luc Morissette	0	2	0	0	3	0	0	1	6
(Ontario) Daniel Hocevar 🔨	1	0	0	1	0	2	1	0	5

==== Draw 10 ====
Saturday, September 6, 9:30 pm

Sheet 3	1	2	3	4	5	6	7	8	Final
(China) Xu Xiaoming	0	0	1	0	0	0	1	X	2
(Nova Scotia) Owen Purcell 🔨	0	3	0	0	0	2	0	X	5

==== Draw 11 ====
Sunday, September 7, 9:00 am

Sheet 1	1	2	3	4	5	6	7	8	9	Final
(Ontario) Pat Ferris 🔨	0	1	1	0	0	2	0	3	0	7
(Nova Scotia) Calan MacIsaac	1	0	0	3	1	0	2	0	3	10

Sheet 3	1	2	3	4	5	6	7	8	9	Final
(Ontario) Sam Mooibroek	0	0	1	0	1	0	0	2	0	4
(Scotland) Kyle Waddell 🔨	0	1	0	1	0	0	2	0	1	5

Sheet 4	1	2	3	4	5	6	7	8	Final
(Ontario) Scott Howard 🔨	1	0	0	1	0	1	0	X	3
(Sweden) Niklas Edin	0	2	0	0	2	0	2	X	6

Sheet 6	1	2	3	4	5	6	7	8	Final
(South Korea) Lee Jae-beom	1	0	2	1	0	0	2	X	6
(United States) Korey Dropkin 🔨	0	1	0	0	1	1	0	X	3

Sheet 8	1	2	3	4	5	6	7	8	Final
(Ontario) Mark Kean 🔨	2	1	0	1	0	2	2	X	8
(Quebec) Pierre-Luc Morissette	0	0	2	0	1	0	0	X	3

==== Draw 12 ====
Sunday, September 7, 2:00 pm

Sheet 2	1	2	3	4	5	6	7	8	Final
(Ontario) Mark Kean	0	2	0	0	0	0	0	X	2
(United States) Korey Dropkin 🔨	2	0	0	0	2	2	2	X	8

Sheet 5	1	2	3	4	5	6	7	8	Final
(Nova Scotia) Owen Purcell	0	0	0	0	2	0	0	1	3
(Ontario) Scott Howard 🔨	0	1	0	1	0	0	2	0	4

Sheet 6	1	2	3	4	5	6	7	8	Final
(Nova Scotia) Calan MacIsaac 🔨	1	0	0	0	2	X	X	X	3
(Ontario) Sam Mooibroek	0	1	2	5	0	X	X	X	8

=== Playoffs ===
Quarterfinals
1	(Scotland) Ross Whyte	7
8	(Ontario) Scott Howard	3
4	(Scotland) Kyle Waddell	2
5	(Sweden) Niklas Edin	7
3	(South Korea) Lee Jae-beom	4
6	(Ontario) Sam Mooibroek	3
2	(Ontario) John Epping	5
7	(United States) Korey Dropkin	8

Semifinals
1	(Scotland) Ross Whyte	5
5	(Sweden) Niklas Edin	2
3	(South Korea) Lee Jae-beom	5
7	(United States) Korey Dropkin	8

Final
1	(Scotland) Ross Whyte	7
7	(United States) Korey Dropkin	3

==== Quarterfinals ====
Sunday, September 7, 7:00 pm

Sheet 2	1	2	3	4	5	6	7	8	Final
(South Korea) Lee Jae-beom 🔨	0	1	0	1	1	0	0	1	4
(Ontario) Sam Mooibroek	0	0	1	0	0	1	1	0	3

Sheet 3	1	2	3	4	5	6	7	8	Final
(Ontario) John Epping 🔨	0	0	2	0	2	0	1	X	5
(United States) Korey Dropkin	0	1	0	5	0	2	0	X	8

Sheet 5	1	2	3	4	5	6	7	8	Final
(Scotland) Kyle Waddell 🔨	0	1	0	1	0	0	X	X	2
(Sweden) Niklas Edin	0	0	3	0	2	2	X	X	7

Sheet 7	1	2	3	4	5	6	7	8	Final
(Scotland) Ross Whyte 🔨	2	0	0	2	0	0	3	X	7
(Ontario) Scott Howard	0	2	0	0	1	0	0	X	3

==== Semifinals ====
Monday, September 8, 12:15 pm

Sheet 3	1	2	3	4	5	6	7	8	Final
(Scotland) Ross Whyte 🔨	1	1	0	0	1	0	2	X	5
(Sweden) Niklas Edin	0	0	1	0	0	1	0	X	2

Sheet 7	1	2	3	4	5	6	7	8	Final
(South Korea) Lee Jae-beom 🔨	0	2	0	0	2	0	1	0	5
(United States) Korey Dropkin	1	0	1	1	0	4	0	1	8

==== Final ====
Monday, September 8, 3:30 pm

Sheet 4	1	2	3	4	5	6	7	8	Final
(Scotland) Ross Whyte 🔨	1	2	1	0	0	2	1	X	7
(United States) Korey Dropkin	0	0	0	2	1	0	0	X	3

== Women ==
=== Teams ===
The teams are listed as follows:

Skip	Third	Second	Lead	Alternate	Locale
Hailey Armstrong	Grace Lloyd	Michaela Robert	Rachel Steele	Grace Cave	Whitby, Ontario
Emma Artichuk	Jamie Smith	Evelyn Robert	Lauren Rajala		Waterloo, Ontario
Elizabeth Cousins	Annmarie Dubberstein	Allison Howell	Elizabeth Janiak		(United States) Nashua, New Hampshire
Abby Deschene	Mackenzie Daley	Mia Toner	Emma Acres		North Bay, Ontario
Hollie Duncan	Megan Balsdon	Rachelle Strybosch	Tess Guyatt		Woodstock, Ontario
Madeleine Dupont	Mathilde Halse	Denise Dupont	My Larsen	Jasmin Holtermann	Hvidovre, Denmark
Ha Seung-youn	Kim Hye-rin	Yang Tae-i	Kim Su-jin	Park Seo-jin	Chuncheon, South Korea
Fay Henderson	Lisa Davie	Hailey Duff	Katie McMillan	Laura Watt	Stirling, Scotland
Carly Howard	Grace Holyoke	Stephanie Mumford	Alice Holyoke		Toronto, Ontario
Danielle Inglis	Kira Brunton	Calissa Daly	Cassandra de Groot	Kim Tuck	Ottawa, Ontario
Emilie Lovitt	Celeste Gauthier	Paige Bown	Sarah Leung		Navan, Ontario
Kayla MacMillan	Brittany Tran	Lindsay Dubue	Lauren Lenentine	Sarah Loken	Victoria, British Columbia
Julia Markle	Scotia Maltman	Tori Zemmelink	Sadie McCutcheon		Navan, Ontario
Rebecca Morrison (Fourth)	Jennifer Dodds	Sophie Sinclair	Sophie Jackson (Skip) (Note: Sophie Jackson skipped Team Morrison.)		Stirling, Scotland
Chelsea Principi	Lauren Peskett	Brenda Chapman	Keira McLaughlin		Niagara Falls, Ontario
Kim Rhyme	Stephanie Senneker	Libby Brundage	Anya Normandeau		(United States) Minneapolis, Minnesota
Darcy Robertson	Rhonda Varnes	Brooklyn Meiklejohn	Kylie Lippens		Winnipeg, Manitoba
Breanna Rozon	Chrissy Cadorin	Stephanie Thompson	Jillian Page	Leigh Armstrong	Oshawa, Ontario
Xenia Schwaller	Selina Gafner	Fabienne Rieder	Selina Rychiger		Zurich, Switzerland
Delaney Strouse (Fourth)	Anne O'Hara	Sydney Mullaney	Madison Bear (Skip) (Note: Madison Bear skipped Team Strouse.)		(United States) Traverse City, Michigan
Momoha Tabata (Fourth)	Miku Nihira (Skip) (Note: Miku Nihira skipped Team Tabata.)	Sae Yamamoto	Mikoto Nakajima		Sapporo, Japan
Isabella Wranå	Almida de Val	Maria Larsson	Linda Stenlund		Sundbyberg, Sweden

=== Knockout Brackets ===
==== A Event ====
First Knockout	Qualifier 1
(Japan) Team Tabata	5
(United States) Elizabeth Cousins	2	(Ontario) Chelsea Principi	4
(Ontario) Chelsea Principi	5	(Japan) Team Tabata	1
(Scotland) Fay Henderson	6	(Scotland) Team Morrison	7
(Ontario) Hailey Armstrong	3	(Scotland) Fay Henderson	6
(Scotland) Team Morrison	8	(Scotland) Team Morrison	7
(Manitoba) Darcy Robertson	2

First Knockout				Qualifier 2
(South Korea) Ha Seung-youn	9
(Ontario) Emilie Lovitt	1	(South Korea) Ha Seung-youn	5
(British Columbia) Kayla MacMillan	4	(British Columbia) Kayla MacMillan	3
(Ontario) Emma Artichuk	2			(South Korea) Ha Seung-youn	4
(Denmark) Madeleine Dupont	8			(Denmark) Madeleine Dupont	2
(Ontario) Hollie Duncan	6	(Denmark) Madeleine Dupont	7
(Ontario) Julia Markle	3	(Ontario) Carly Howard	3
(Ontario) Carly Howard	8

First Knockout	Qualifier 3
(Ontario) Danielle Inglis	5
(Switzerland) Xenia Schwaller	6	(Switzerland) Xenia Schwaller	7
(Ontario) Abby Deschene	1	(Switzerland) Xenia Schwaller	6
(United States) Team Strouse	3	(Sweden) Isabella Wranå	2
(Ontario) Breanna Rozon	6	(Ontario) Breanna Rozon	2
(Sweden) Isabella Wranå	8	(Sweden) Isabella Wranå	7
(United States) Kim Rhyme	1

==== B Event ====
Second Knockout	Qualifier 4
(United States) Elizabeth Cousins	1
(British Columbia) Kayla MacMillan	9
(British Columbia) Kayla MacMillan	7
(Ontario) Carly Howard	4
(Ontario) Carly Howard	6
(Ontario) Hailey Armstrong	9	(Ontario) Hailey Armstrong	3
(Manitoba) Darcy Robertson	2	(British Columbia) Kayla MacMillan	5
(Sweden) Isabella Wranå	7

Second Knockout	Qualifier 5
(Ontario) Danielle Inglis	4
(Ontario) Emilie Lovitt	4	(Ontario) Emma Artichuk	7
(Ontario) Emma Artichuk	7	(Ontario) Emma Artichuk	3
(Ontario) Hollie Duncan	5
(Ontario) Breanna Rozon	5
(Ontario) Hollie Duncan	6	(Ontario) Hollie Duncan	7
(Ontario) Julia Markle	2	(Ontario) Hollie Duncan	2
(Japan) Team Tabata	7

Second Knockout	Qualifier 6
(Ontario) Abby Deschene	1
(Ontario) Chelsea Principi	8
(Ontario) Chelsea Principi	4
(Scotland) Fay Henderson	7
(Scotland) Fay Henderson	8
(United States) Team Strouse	4	(United States) Kim Rhyme	2
(United States) Kim Rhyme	7	(Scotland) Fay Henderson	6
(Denmark) Madeleine Dupont	7

==== C Event ====
Third Knockout	Qualifier 7
(Ontario) Hollie Duncan	12
(United States) Elizabeth Cousins	10
(Manitoba) Darcy Robertson	4
(United States) Elizabeth Cousins	10
(Ontario) Hollie Duncan	8
(Ontario) Hailey Armstrong	3
(British Columbia) Kayla MacMillan	4
(Ontario) Hailey Armstrong	5
(Ontario) Hailey Armstrong	7
(Ontario) Emilie Lovitt	7	(Ontario) Emilie Lovitt	0
(Ontario) Julia Markle	4

Third Knockout	Qualifier 8
(United States) Team Strouse	3
(Ontario) Carly Howard	5
(Ontario) Carly Howard	7
(Ontario) Danielle Inglis	3
(Ontario) Emma Artichuk	4
(Ontario) Danielle Inglis	6	(Ontario) Danielle Inglis	6
(Ontario) Breanna Rozon	0	(Ontario) Carly Howard	2
(Scotland) Fay Henderson	4
(Ontario) Chelsea Principi	7
(Ontario) Abby Deschene	5	(Ontario) Abby Deschene	2
(United States) Kim Rhyme	3	(Ontario) Chelsea Principi	4
(Scotland) Fay Henderson	6

=== Knockout Results ===
All draw times are listed in Eastern Time (UTC−04:00).

==== Draw 1 ====
Friday, September 5, 9:00 am

Sheet 2	1	2	3	4	5	6	7	8	Final
(United States) Elizabeth Cousins 🔨	0	0	0	1	1	0	0	0	2
(Ontario) Chelsea Principi	0	2	0	0	0	1	1	1	5

Sheet 3	1	2	3	4	5	6	7	8	Final
(Scotland) Fay Henderson	2	0	2	0	0	0	2	X	6
(Ontario) Hailey Armstrong 🔨	0	1	0	1	1	0	0	X	3

Sheet 4	1	2	3	4	5	6	7	8	Final
(Scotland) Team Morrison 🔨	1	0	2	2	0	3	X	X	8
(Manitoba) Darcy Robertson	0	1	0	0	1	0	X	X	2

==== Draw 2 ====
Friday, September 5, 12:30 pm

Sheet 2	1	2	3	4	5	6	7	8	Final
(Ontario) Julia Markle	0	2	1	0	0	0	0	X	3
(Ontario) Carly Howard 🔨	4	0	0	2	0	2	0	X	8

Sheet 3	1	2	3	4	5	6	7	8	Final
(South Korea) Ha Seung-youn	2	0	2	2	1	2	X	X	9
(Ontario) Emilie Lovitt 🔨	0	1	0	0	0	0	X	X	1

Sheet 4	1	2	3	4	5	6	7	8	Final
(Switzerland) Xenia Schwaller 🔨	1	0	2	1	0	0	2	X	6
(Ontario) Abby Deschene	0	0	0	0	1	0	0	X	1

Sheet 5	1	2	3	4	5	6	7	8	Final
(Denmark) Madeleine Dupont	1	0	2	0	0	4	0	1	8
(Ontario) Hollie Duncan 🔨	0	1	0	3	1	0	1	0	6

Sheet 6	1	2	3	4	5	6	7	8	Final
(Sweden) Isabella Wranå	2	0	1	0	4	1	X	X	8
(United States) Kim Rhyme 🔨	0	0	0	1	0	0	X	X	1

Sheet 7	1	2	3	4	5	6	7	8	Final
(British Columbia) Kayla MacMillan 🔨	0	1	0	1	1	0	0	1	4
(Ontario) Emma Artichuk	0	0	1	0	0	0	1	0	2

Sheet 8	1	2	3	4	5	6	7	8	Final
(United States) Team Strouse	0	0	1	0	1	1	0	X	3
(Ontario) Breanna Rozon 🔨	0	2	0	2	0	0	2	X	6

==== Draw 4 ====
Friday, September 5, 7:00 pm

Sheet 2	1	2	3	4	5	6	7	8	Final
(Scotland) Fay Henderson	0	0	0	1	0	1	4	0	6
(Scotland) Team Morrison 🔨	0	2	1	0	3	0	0	1	7

Sheet 3	1	2	3	4	5	6	7	8	Final
(Ontario) Breanna Rozon	0	0	0	1	0	1	0	X	2
(Sweden) Isabella Wranå 🔨	0	2	1	0	2	0	2	X	7

Sheet 4	1	2	3	4	5	6	7	8	Final
(South Korea) Ha Seung-youn	0	0	0	0	3	0	2	X	5
(British Columbia) Kayla MacMillan 🔨	0	0	1	1	0	1	0	X	3

Sheet 5	1	2	3	4	5	6	7	8	9	Final
(Japan) Team Tabata 🔨	0	1	0	1	0	1	1	0	1	5
(Ontario) Chelsea Principi	0	0	2	0	1	0	0	1	0	4

Sheet 6	1	2	3	4	5	6	7	8	Final
(Denmark) Madeleine Dupont 🔨	2	0	0	2	0	1	2	X	7
(Ontario) Carly Howard	0	1	1	0	1	0	0	X	3

Sheet 7	1	2	3	4	5	6	7	8	Final
(Ontario) Danielle Inglis	0	1	0	2	2	0	0	0	5
(Switzerland) Xenia Schwaller 🔨	2	0	2	0	0	2	0	1	7

Sheet 8	1	2	3	4	5	6	7	8	Final
(Ontario) Hailey Armstrong 🔨	2	1	2	0	0	2	2	X	9
(Manitoba) Darcy Robertson	0	0	0	1	1	0	0	X	2

==== Draw 5 ====
Friday, September 5, 9:30 pm

Sheet 5	1	2	3	4	5	6	7	8	Final
(Ontario) Emilie Lovitt 🔨	0	2	0	1	0	1	0	X	4
(Ontario) Emma Artichuk	2	0	3	0	1	0	1	X	7

Sheet 6	1	2	3	4	5	6	7	8	Final
(Ontario) Hollie Duncan	0	2	1	1	2	0	X	X	6
(Ontario) Julia Markle 🔨	0	0	0	0	0	2	X	X	2

Sheet 7	1	2	3	4	5	6	7	8	Final
(United States) Team Strouse	1	0	1	1	0	0	1	0	4
(United States) Kim Rhyme 🔨	0	2	0	0	2	1	0	2	7

==== Draw 6 ====
Saturday, September 6, 9:00 am

Sheet 1	1	2	3	4	5	6	7	8	Final
(United States) Elizabeth Cousins 🔨	0	0	1	0	0	X	X	X	1
(British Columbia) Kayla MacMillan	1	2	0	4	2	X	X	X	9

Sheet 2	1	2	3	4	5	6	7	8	Final
(Ontario) Danielle Inglis	0	1	0	1	0	1	1	0	4
(Ontario) Emma Artichuk 🔨	2	0	2	0	1	0	0	2	7

Sheet 3	1	2	3	4	5	6	7	8	Final
(Ontario) Carly Howard 🔨	0	0	2	0	1	1	0	2	6
(Ontario) Hailey Armstrong	1	1	0	1	0	0	0	0	3

Sheet 4	1	2	3	4	5	6	7	8	Final
(Ontario) Breanna Rozon	1	0	0	0	3	0	1	0	5
(Ontario) Hollie Duncan 🔨	0	2	0	1	0	2	0	2	7

==== Draw 7 ====
Saturday, September 6, 12:30 pm

Sheet 1	1	2	3	4	5	6	7	8	Final
(Ontario) Abby Deschene	0	0	1	0	0	0	0	X	1
(Ontario) Chelsea Principi 🔨	0	0	0	2	1	2	3	X	8

Sheet 2	1	2	3	4	5	6	7	8	Final
(South Korea) Ha Seung-youn	0	0	0	0	1	0	1	2	4
(Denmark) Madeleine Dupont 🔨	0	1	0	0	0	1	0	0	2

Sheet 3	1	2	3	4	5	6	7	8	Final
(Japan) Team Tabata	0	0	1	0	0	0	X	X	1
(Scotland) Team Morrison 🔨	0	2	0	1	3	1	X	X	7

Sheet 4	1	2	3	4	5	6	7	8	Final
(Scotland) Fay Henderson 🔨	1	0	5	0	2	X	X	X	8
(United States) Kim Rhyme	0	1	0	1	0	X	X	X	2

Sheet 5	1	2	3	4	5	6	7	8	Final
(Switzerland) Xenia Schwaller 🔨	2	1	0	0	0	1	1	1	6
(Sweden) Isabella Wranå	0	0	1	1	0	0	0	0	2

==== Draw 8 ====
Saturday, September 6, 3:15 pm

Sheet 6	1	2	3	4	5	6	7	8	Final
(Ontario) Danielle Inglis 🔨	0	1	0	3	1	1	X	X	6
(Ontario) Breanna Rozon	0	0	0	0	0	0	X	X	0

Sheet 7	1	2	3	4	5	6	7	8	Final
(Ontario) Emilie Lovitt	0	0	3	0	1	0	1	2	7
(Ontario) Julia Markle 🔨	0	1	0	1	0	2	0	0	4

Sheet 8	1	2	3	4	5	6	7	8	9	Final
(Ontario) Abby Deschene	0	0	0	1	0	1	0	1	2	5
(United States) Kim Rhyme 🔨	1	0	0	0	1	0	1	0	0	3

==== Draw 9 ====
Saturday, September 6, 7:00 pm

Sheet 3	1	2	3	4	5	6	7	8	Final
(Ontario) Emma Artichuk	0	1	0	0	1	0	1	0	3
(Ontario) Hollie Duncan 🔨	1	0	1	1	0	1	0	1	5

Sheet 5	1	2	3	4	5	6	7	8	Final
(British Columbia) Kayla MacMillan	1	0	3	0	1	2	0	X	7
(Ontario) Carly Howard 🔨	0	1	0	2	0	0	1	X	4

Sheet 6	1	2	3	4	5	6	7	8	Final
(Ontario) Chelsea Principi	0	3	0	0	0	1	X	X	4
(Scotland) Fay Henderson 🔨	1	0	1	3	2	0	X	X	7

==== Draw 10 ====
Saturday, September 6, 9:30 pm

Sheet 2	1	2	3	4	5	6	7	8	Final
(Ontario) Hailey Armstrong 🔨	0	3	1	3	X	X	X	X	7
(Ontario) Emilie Lovitt	0	0	0	0	X	X	X	X	0

Sheet 4	1	2	3	4	5	6	7	8	Final
(United States) Team Strouse 🔨	0	0	1	0	0	1	0	1	3
(Ontario) Carly Howard	0	1	0	0	1	0	3	0	5

Sheet 5	1	2	3	4	5	6	7	8	Final
(Ontario) Emma Artichuk	0	2	0	0	1	0	1	0	4
(Ontario) Danielle Inglis 🔨	1	0	0	1	0	3	0	1	6

Sheet 6	1	2	3	4	5	6	7	8	Final
(Manitoba) Darcy Robertson	0	0	2	0	2	0	X	X	4
(United States) Elizabeth Cousins 🔨	0	2	0	5	0	3	X	X	10

Sheet 7	1	2	3	4	5	6	7	8	Final
(Ontario) Chelsea Principi	0	0	1	3	2	0	1	X	7
(Ontario) Abby Deschene 🔨	0	1	0	0	0	1	0	X	2

==== Draw 11 ====
Sunday, September 7, 9:00 am

Sheet 2	1	2	3	4	5	6	7	8	Final
(British Columbia) Kayla MacMillan	0	1	0	1	0	2	1	0	5
(Sweden) Isabella Wranå 🔨	2	0	1	0	2	0	0	2	7

Sheet 5	1	2	3	4	5	6	7	8	Final
(Ontario) Hollie Duncan	0	0	0	2	0	0	0	X	2
(Japan) Team Tabata 🔨	0	1	0	0	0	2	4	X	7

Sheet 7	1	2	3	4	5	6	7	8	9	Final
(Scotland) Fay Henderson	0	1	1	0	2	0	2	0	0	6
(Denmark) Madeleine Dupont 🔨	1	0	0	2	0	1	0	2	1	7

==== Draw 12 ====
Sunday, September 7, 2:00 pm

Sheet 3	1	2	3	4	5	6	7	8	Final
(Ontario) Chelsea Principi 🔨	2	0	1	0	1	0	0	X	4
(Scotland) Fay Henderson	0	1	0	1	0	4	0	X	6

Sheet 4	1	2	3	4	5	6	7	8	Final
(British Columbia) Kayla MacMillan	0	0	0	2	0	1	1	0	4
(Ontario) Hailey Armstrong 🔨	0	1	1	0	1	0	0	2	5

Sheet 7	1	2	3	4	5	6	7	8	9	Final
(Ontario) Hollie Duncan 🔨	2	0	2	0	2	0	4	0	2	12
(United States) Elizabeth Cousins	0	5	0	1	0	3	0	1	0	10

Sheet 8	1	2	3	4	5	6	7	8	Final
(Ontario) Carly Howard	0	2	0	1	2	0	2	X	7
(Ontario) Danielle Inglis 🔨	1	0	1	0	0	1	0	X	3

==== Draw 13 ====
Sunday, September 7, 7:00 pm

Sheet 4	1	2	3	4	5	6	7	8	Final
(Ontario) Carly Howard	0	0	2	0	0	0	0	X	2
(Scotland) Fay Henderson 🔨	0	1	0	0	1	0	2	X	4

Sheet 6	1	2	3	4	5	6	7	8	Final
(Ontario) Hollie Duncan 🔨	0	2	1	2	0	0	2	1	8
(Ontario) Hailey Armstrong	1	0	0	0	1	1	0	0	3

=== Playoffs ===
Quarterfinals
A1	(Scotland) Team Morrison	9
C2	(Scotland) Fay Henderson	4
B2	(Japan) Team Tabata	5
B3	(Denmark) Madeleine Dupont	1
A2	(South Korea) Ha Seung-youn	7
C1	(Ontario) Hollie Duncan	2
A3	(Switzerland) Xenia Schwaller	3
B1	(Sweden) Isabella Wranå	4

Semifinals
A1	(Scotland) Team Morrison	4
B2	(Japan) Team Tabata	5
A2	(South Korea) Ha Seung-youn	7
B1	(Sweden) Isabella Wranå	5

Final
B2	(Japan) Team Tabata	5
A2	(South Korea) Ha Seung-youn	6

==== Quarterfinals ====
Monday, September 8, 8:45 am

Sheet 3	1	2	3	4	5	6	7	8	Final
(South Korea) Ha Seung-youn 🔨	0	0	3	0	2	1	1	X	7
(Ontario) Hollie Duncan	0	1	0	1	0	0	0	X	2

Sheet 4	1	2	3	4	5	6	7	8	Final
(Japan) Team Tabata	0	0	2	0	0	2	1	X	5
(Denmark) Madeleine Dupont 🔨	1	0	0	0	0	0	0	X	1

Sheet 6	1	2	3	4	5	6	7	8	Final
(Switzerland) Xenia Schwaller 🔨	0	0	0	2	0	0	1	0	3
(Sweden) Isabella Wranå	0	0	1	0	1	1	0	1	4

Sheet 7	1	2	3	4	5	6	7	8	Final
(Scotland) Team Morrison 🔨	4	0	2	0	2	0	1	X	9
(Scotland) Fay Henderson	0	1	0	1	0	2	0	X	4

==== Semifinals ====
Monday, September 8, 12:15 pm

Sheet 4	1	2	3	4	5	6	7	8	Final
(Scotland) Team Morrison 🔨	0	1	0	2	0	0	0	1	4
(Japan) Team Tabata	0	0	2	0	2	1	0	0	5

Sheet 6	1	2	3	4	5	6	7	8	Final
(South Korea) Ha Seung-youn 🔨	3	0	1	0	1	1	0	1	7
(Sweden) Isabella Wranå	0	1	0	3	0	0	1	0	5

==== Final ====
Monday, September 8, 3:30 pm

Sheet 5	1	2	3	4	5	6	7	8	Final
(Japan) Team Tabata	0	2	0	0	1	0	2	0	5
(South Korea) Ha Seung-youn 🔨	1	0	0	0	0	2	0	3	6
