= 2019 Glynhill Ladies International =

World Curling Tour event

- Host city: Renfrew, Glasgow, Scotland
- Arena: Braehead Curling Rink
- Dates: January 17–20
- Winner: (Switzerland) Team Hegner
- Curling club: CC Uzwil, Uzwil
- Skip: Ursi Hegner
- Fourth: Michèle Jäggi
- Second: Nina Ledergerber
- Lead: Claudia Baumann
- Finalist: (Switzerland) Elena Stern

The 2019 Glynhill Ladies International was held January 17 to 20, 2019 at the Braehead Curling Rink in Renfrew, Glasgow, Scotland as a part of the 2018–19 curling season. The event was held in a round robin format with the top eight teams advancing to the playoffs. The purse for the event was £ 11,000.

In an all Swiss final, Team Ursi Hegner of Uzwil defeated Team Elena Stern of Brig-Glis 5–3 to claim the event title. To reach the final, Hegner defeated Team Isabella Wranå of Sweden 5–4 in one semifinal and Stern beat Team Tova Sundberg, also of Sweden, 8–0 in the other.

== Teams ==
The teams are listed as follows:

Skip	Third	Second	Lead	Locale
Lisa Davie	Kirsty Barr	Anna Skuse	Emma Barr	Stirling, Scotland
Binia Feltscher	Carole Howald	Stefanie Berset	Larissa Hari	Langenthal, Switzerland
Michèle Jäggi (Fourth)	Ursi Hegner (Skip)	Nina Ledergerber	Claudia Baumann	Uzwil, Switzerland
Fay Henderson	Katie Jackson	Holly Davies	Beth Rowley	Stirling, Scotland
Sophie Jackson	Naomi Brown	Mili Smith	Sophie Sinclair	Stirling, Scotland
Daniela Jentsch	Emira Abbes	Analena Jentsch	Klara-Hermine Fomm	Füssen, Germany
Jiang Yilun	Zhang Lijun	Dong Ziqi	Jiang Xindi	Harbin, China
Junko Nishimuro (Fourth)	Tori Koana (Skip)	Yuna Kotani	Mao Ishigaki	Fujiyoshida, Japan
Anna Kubešková	Alžběta Baudyšová	Tereza Plíšková	Ežen Kolčevská	Prague, Czech Republic
Rebecca Morrison	Hailey Duff	Leeanne McKenzie	Beth Dandie	Stirling, Scotland
Irene Schori	Lara Stocker	Roxanne Héritier	Isabelle Maillard	Limmattal, Switzerland
Anna Sidorova	Margarita Fomina	Alexandra Raeva	Nkeirouka Ezekh	Moscow, Russia
Briar Hürlimann (Fourth)	Elena Stern (Skip)	Lisa Gisler	Céline Koller	Brig-Glis, Switzerland
Tova Sundberg	Emma Sjödin	Maria Larsson	Sofie Bergman	Östersund, Sweden
Maggie Wilson	Jennifer Marshall	Amy MacDonald	Eilidh Yeats	Stirling, Scotland
Isabella Wranå	Jennie Wåhlin	Almida de Val	Fanny Sjöberg	Sundbyberg, Sweden

== Round-robin standings ==
Final round-robin standings

Key
Teams to Playoffs

Pool A	W	L
(Switzerland) Elena Stern	3	0
(Japan) Tori Koana	2	1
(China) Jiang Yilun	1	2
(Switzerland) Irene Schori	0	3

Pool B	W	L
(Sweden) Isabella Wranå	3	0
(Sweden) Tova Sundberg	2	1
(Scotland) Sophie Jackson	1	2
(Czech Republic) Anna Kubešková	0	3

Pool C	W	L
(Germany) Daniela Jentsch	3	0
(Russia) Anna Sidorova	2	1
(Scotland) Maggie Wilson	1	2
(Scotland) Fay Henderson	0	3

Pool D	W	L
(Switzerland) Ursi Hegner	3	0
(Switzerland) Binia Feltscher	2	1
(Scotland) Lisa Davie	1	2
(Scotland) Rebecca Morrison	0	3

== Round-robin results ==
All draw times are listed in Greenwich Mean Time (UTC+00:00).

=== Draw 1 ===
Thursday, January 17, 7:00 pm

Sheet 2	1	2	3	4	5	6	7	8	Final
(Switzerland) Elena Stern	1	1	4	1	0	1	X	X	8
(Switzerland) Irene Schori	0	0	0	0	2	0	X	X	2

Sheet 3	1	2	3	4	5	6	7	8	Final
(Japan) Tori Koana	0	2	0	0	2	3	0	X	7
(China) Jiang Yilun	1	0	1	2	0	0	1	X	5

Sheet 6	1	2	3	4	5	6	7	8	Final
(Sweden) Isabella Wranå	2	0	4	0	2	0	3	X	11
(Czech Republic) Anna Kubešková	0	2	0	1	0	1	0	X	4

Sheet 7	1	2	3	4	5	6	7	8	Final
(Scotland) Sophie Jackson	0	0	0	0	1	0	2	X	3
(Sweden) Tova Sundberg	1	1	1	1	0	2	0	X	6

=== Draw 2 ===
Friday, January 18, 9:00 am

Sheet 2	1	2	3	4	5	6	7	8	Final
(Russia) Anna Sidorova	0	0	2	0	1	0	0	X	3
(Germany) Daniela Jentsch	1	1	0	2	0	3	1	X	8

Sheet 3	1	2	3	4	5	6	7	8	9	Final
(Scotland) Maggie Wilson	0	0	2	0	2	0	0	0	1	5
(Scotland) Fay Henderson	0	0	0	1	0	1	1	1	0	4

Sheet 6	1	2	3	4	5	6	7	8	9	Final
(Switzerland) Binia Feltscher	0	0	0	1	1	1	0	1	0	4
(Switzerland) Ursi Hegner	0	1	2	0	0	0	1	0	1	5

Sheet 7	1	2	3	4	5	6	7	8	Final
(Scotland) Rebecca Morrison	2	0	0	0	2	0	0	0	4
(Scotland) Lisa Davie	0	1	1	2	0	1	1	3	9

=== Draw 3 ===
Friday, January 18, 12:30 pm

Sheet 2	1	2	3	4	5	6	7	8	Final
(Sweden) Isabella Wranå	0	3	2	0	1	0	0	1	7
(Scotland) Sophie Jackson	1	0	0	1	0	2	1	0	5

Sheet 3	1	2	3	4	5	6	7	8	Final
(Czech Republic) Anna Kubešková	0	0	0	0	1	2	0	0	3
(Sweden) Tova Sundberg	0	2	1	1	0	0	1	1	6

Sheet 4	1	2	3	4	5	6	7	8	Final
(Switzerland) Elena Stern	2	0	4	0	2	2	X	X	10
(Japan) Tori Koana	0	1	0	1	0	0	X	X	2

Sheet 5	1	2	3	4	5	6	7	8	Final
(Switzerland) Irene Schori	0	0	1	0	1	0	X	X	2
(China) Jiang Yilun	3	2	0	2	0	3	X	X	10

=== Draw 4 ===
Friday, January 18, 4:00 pm

Sheet 2	1	2	3	4	5	6	7	8	Final
(Switzerland) Binia Feltscher	0	5	1	1	1	X	X	X	8
(Scotland) Rebecca Morrison	1	0	0	0	0	X	X	X	1

Sheet 3	1	2	3	4	5	6	7	8	Final
(Switzerland) Ursi Hegner	1	0	2	0	3	0	2	X	8
(Scotland) Lisa Davie	0	1	0	1	0	1	0	X	3

Sheet 4	1	2	3	4	5	6	7	8	Final
(Russia) Anna Sidorova	1	0	1	1	2	0	X	X	5
(Scotland) Maggie Wilson	0	0	0	0	0	1	X	X	1

Sheet 5	1	2	3	4	5	6	7	8	Final
(Germany) Daniela Jentsch	1	0	3	0	1	0	1	X	6
(Scotland) Fay Henderson	0	2	0	1	0	0	0	X	3

=== Draw 5 ===
Saturday, January 19, 9:00 am

Sheet 4	1	2	3	4	5	6	7	8	Final
(Sweden) Tova Sundberg	1	0	0	1	0	X	X	X	2
(Sweden) Isabella Wranå	0	3	3	0	2	X	X	X	8

Sheet 5	1	2	3	4	5	6	7	8	Final
(Czech Republic) Anna Kubešková	0	1	0	0	2	0	1	X	4
(Scotland) Sophie Jackson	2	0	2	3	0	1	0	X	8

Sheet 6	1	2	3	4	5	6	7	8	Final
(China) Jiang Yilun	0	2	0	0	2	0	2	0	6
(Switzerland) Elena Stern	1	0	3	1	0	1	0	1	7

Sheet 7	1	2	3	4	5	6	7	8	9	Final
(Switzerland) Irene Schori	1	3	0	0	0	0	3	0	0	7
(Japan) Tori Koana	0	0	2	1	2	1	0	1	2	9

=== Draw 6 ===
Saturday, January 19, 12:30 pm

Sheet 4	1	2	3	4	5	6	7	8	Final
(Scotland) Lisa Davie	0	1	0	1	0	0	2	X	4
(Switzerland) Binia Feltscher	2	0	1	0	2	3	0	X	8

Sheet 5	1	2	3	4	5	6	7	8	9	Final
(Switzerland) Ursi Hegner	0	0	2	0	0	1	1	0	1	5
(Scotland) Rebecca Morrison	2	0	0	0	1	0	0	1	0	4

Sheet 6	1	2	3	4	5	6	7	8	Final
(Scotland) Fay Henderson	0	0	0	1	0	1	0	X	2
(Russia) Anna Sidorova	0	2	1	0	2	0	2	X	7

Sheet 7	1	2	3	4	5	6	7	8	Final
(Germany) Daniela Jentsch	2	2	0	2	1	X	X	X	7
(Scotland) Maggie Wilson	0	0	0	0	0	X	X	X	0

== Playoffs ==
Quarterfinals
A1	(Switzerland) Elena Stern	7
D2	(Switzerland) Binia Feltscher	5
C1	(Germany) Daniela Jentsch	5
B2	(Sweden) Tova Sundberg	8
B1	(Sweden) Isabella Wranå	4
C2	(Russia) Anna Sidorova	3
D1	(Switzerland) Ursi Hegner	7
A2	(Japan) Tori Koana	6

Semifinals
A1	(Switzerland) Elena Stern	8
B2	(Sweden) Tova Sundberg	0
B1	(Sweden) Isabella Wranå	4
D1	(Switzerland) Ursi Hegner	5

Final
A1	(Switzerland) Elena Stern	3
D1	(Switzerland) Ursi Hegner	5

=== Quarterfinals ===
Saturday, January 19, 4:00 pm

Team	1	2	3	4	5	6	7	8	Final
(Switzerland) Elena Stern	0	1	1	2	0	3	0	X	7
(Switzerland) Binia Feltscher	0	0	0	0	3	0	2	X	5

Team	1	2	3	4	5	6	7	8	Final
(Germany) Daniela Jentsch	2	0	0	2	0	1	0	X	5
(Sweden) Tova Sundberg	0	2	2	0	1	0	3	X	8

Team	1	2	3	4	5	6	7	8	Final
(Sweden) Isabella Wranå	1	1	0	0	0	1	0	1	4
(Russia) Anna Sidorova	0	0	0	2	0	0	1	0	3

Team	1	2	3	4	5	6	7	8	9	Final
(Switzerland) Ursi Hegner	2	0	2	0	1	1	0	0	1	7
(Japan) Tori Koana	0	1	0	2	0	0	2	1	0	6

=== Semifinals ===
Sunday, January 20, 11:30 am

Team	1	2	3	4	5	6	7	8	Final
(Switzerland) Elena Stern	1	3	0	1	3	X	X	X	8
(Sweden) Tova Sundberg	0	0	0	0	0	X	X	X	0

Team	1	2	3	4	5	6	7	8	9	Final
(Sweden) Isabella Wranå	0	1	1	1	0	0	1	0	0	4
(Switzerland) Ursi Hegner	0	0	0	0	0	3	0	1	1	5

=== Final ===
Sunday, January 20, 2:30 pm

Team	1	2	3	4	5	6	7	8	Final
(Switzerland) Elena Stern	0	0	1	1	1	0	0	0	3
(Switzerland) Ursi Hegner	0	3	0	0	0	0	0	2	5
