= 2020 Glynhill Ladies International =

World Curling Tour event

- Host city: Renfrew, Glasgow, Scotland
- Arena: Braehead Curling Rink
- Dates: January 16–19
- Winner: (South Korea) Team Kim
- Curling club: Uiseong CC, Uiseong
- Skip: Kim Eun-jung
- Third: Kim Kyeong-ae
- Second: Kim Yeong-mi
- Lead: Kim Cho-hi
- Finalist: (Sweden) Isabella Wranå

The 2020 Glynhill Ladies International was held January 16 to 19, 2020 at the Braehead Curling Rink in Renfrew, Glasgow, Scotland as a part of the 2019–20 curling season. The event was held in a round robin format with the top eight teams advancing to the playoffs and the bottom eight teams going to the consolation round. The purse for the event was £ 10,600.

In the final, Team Kim Eun-jung of Korea capped off a perfect 6–0 tournament by defeating Team Isabella Wranå of Sweden 8–3 in the final. In the consolation final, Selina Witschonke of Switzerland topped Maggie Wilson of Scotland 5–4. To reach the final, Kim defeated Team Binia Feltscher of Switzerland 8–7 in one semifinal and Wranå beat Team Anna Sidorova of Russia by the same score in the other.

== Teams ==
The teams are listed as follows:

Skip	Third	Second	Lead	Locale
Lisa Davie	Kirsty Barr	Anna Skuse	Emma Barr	Stirling, Scotland
Binia Feltscher	Carole Howald	Stefanie Berset	Larissa Hari	Langenthal, Switzerland
Han Siyu	Fan Suyuan	Yu Jiaxin	Yan Hui	Changchun, China
Han Yu	Zhang Lijun	Jiang Xindi	Zhao Ruiyi	Beijing, China
Fay Henderson	Alex MacIntosh	Holly Davies	Joanna Sutherland	Stirling, Scotland
Sophie Jackson	Naomi Brown	Mili Smith	Sophie Sinclair	Dumfries, Scotland
Daniela Jentsch	Emira Abbes	Klara-Hermine Fomm	Analena Jentsch	Füssen, Germany
Kim Eun-jung	Kim Kyeong-ae	Kim Yeong-mi	Kim Cho-hi	Uiseong, South Korea
Hailey Duff (Fourth)	Amy MacDonald (Skip)	Layla Al-Saffar	Jane Barr	Stirling, Scotland
Ikue Kitazawa (Fourth)	Chiaki Matsumura	Seina Nakajima (Skip)	Hasumi Ishigooka	Nagano, Japan
Maia Ramsfjell	Martine Rønning	Mille Haslev Nordbye	Astri Forbregd	Lillehammer, Norway
Irene Schori	Lara Stocker	Roxanne Héritier	Isabelle Maillard	Limmattal, Switzerland
Anna Sidorova	Yulia Portunova	Olga Kotelnikova	Julia Guzieva	Moscow, Russia
Rebecca Morrison (Fourth)	Maggie Wilson (Skip)	Jennifer Marshall	Eilidh Yeats	Stirling, Scotland
Selina Witschonke	Elena Mathis	Marina Lörtscher	Anna Gut	Luzern, Switzerland
Isabella Wranå	Jennie Wåhlin	Almida de Val	Fanny Sjöberg	Sundbyberg, Sweden

== Round-robin standings ==
Final round-robin standings

Key
Teams to Playoffs

Pool A	W	L
(Russia) Anna Sidorova	3	0
(Japan) Seina Nakajima	2	1
(Norway) Maia Ramsfjell	1	2
(China) Han Siyu	0	3

Pool B	W	L
(Switzerland) Irene Schori	3	0
(Germany) Daniela Jentsch	2	1
(Scotland) Maggie Wilson	1	2
(Scotland) Amy MacDonald	0	3

Pool C	W	L
(Sweden) Isabella Wranå	2	1
(Switzerland) Binia Feltscher	2	1
(Switzerland) Selina Witschonke	2	1
(Scotland) Lisa Davie	0	3

Pool D	W	L
(South Korea) Kim Eun-jung	3	0
(China) Han Yu	2	1
(Scotland) Sophie Jackson	1	2
(Scotland) Fay Henderson	0	3

== Round-robin results ==
All draw times are listed in Greenwich Mean Time (UTC+00:00).

=== Draw 1 ===
Thursday, January 16, 7:00 pm

Sheet 2	1	2	3	4	5	6	7	8	Final
(Japan) Seina Nakajima	1	0	0	1	0	2	0	X	4
(Russia) Anna Sidorova	0	1	3	0	1	0	2	X	7

Sheet 3	1	2	3	4	5	6	7	8	Final
(China) Han Siyu	0	0	0	0	0	3	0	X	3
(Norway) Maia Ramsfjell	0	2	1	2	2	0	2	X	9

Sheet 6	1	2	3	4	5	6	7	8	Final
(Germany) Daniela Jentsch	0	0	1	1	0	0	1	X	3
(Switzerland) Irene Schori	1	1	0	0	3	1	0	X	6

Sheet 7	1	2	3	4	5	6	7	8	Final
(Scotland) Maggie Wilson	1	1	0	0	2	2	0	1	7
(Scotland) Amy MacDonald	0	0	1	1	0	0	2	0	4

=== Draw 2 ===
Friday, January 17, 9:00 am

Sheet 2	1	2	3	4	5	6	7	8	Final
(Sweden) Isabella Wranå	1	0	2	2	0	0	1	1	7
(Switzerland) Binia Feltscher	0	1	0	0	1	4	0	0	6

Sheet 3	1	2	3	4	5	6	7	8	Final
(Switzerland) Selina Witschonke	2	1	0	2	0	1	0	1	7
(Scotland) Lisa Davie	0	0	1	0	2	0	2	0	5

Sheet 6	1	2	3	4	5	6	7	8	9	Final
(South Korea) Kim Eun-jung	0	0	4	2	2	0	0	0	3	11
(China) Han Yu	2	1	0	0	0	3	1	1	0	8

Sheet 7	1	2	3	4	5	6	7	8	Final
(Scotland) Sophie Jackson	0	2	2	0	2	1	X	X	7
(Scotland) Fay Henderson	0	0	0	1	0	0	X	X	1

=== Draw 3 ===
Friday, January 17, 12:30 pm

Sheet 2	1	2	3	4	5	6	7	8	Final
(Germany) Daniela Jentsch	1	0	3	0	1	0	2	X	7
(Scotland) Maggie Wilson	0	1	0	1	0	1	0	X	3

Sheet 3	1	2	3	4	5	6	7	8	Final
(Switzerland) Irene Schori	0	1	0	1	2	0	0	1	5
(Scotland) Amy MacDonald	0	0	1	0	0	1	1	0	3

Sheet 4	1	2	3	4	5	6	7	8	Final
(Japan) Seina Nakajima	0	2	0	0	4	0	0	X	6
(China) Han Siyu	0	0	0	1	0	1	1	X	3

Sheet 5	1	2	3	4	5	6	7	8	Final
(Russia) Anna Sidorova	0	2	0	3	0	0	1	X	6
(Norway) Maia Ramsfjell	1	0	1	0	1	0	0	X	3

=== Draw 4 ===
Friday, January 17, 4:00 pm

Sheet 2	1	2	3	4	5	6	7	8	Final
(South Korea) Kim Eun-jung	0	2	0	0	0	2	2	0	6
(Scotland) Sophie Jackson	2	0	1	0	1	0	0	1	5

Sheet 3	1	2	3	4	5	6	7	8	Final
(China) Han Yu	2	1	1	2	0	2	X	X	8
(Scotland) Fay Henderson	0	0	0	0	1	0	X	X	1

Sheet 4	1	2	3	4	5	6	7	8	Final
(Sweden) Isabella Wranå	0	1	0	1	0	0	0	0	2
(Switzerland) Selina Witschonke	0	0	1	0	0	0	1	3	5

Sheet 5	1	2	3	4	5	6	7	8	9	Final
(Switzerland) Binia Feltscher	3	2	0	0	0	1	0	0	1	7
(Scotland) Lisa Davie	0	0	1	1	1	0	1	2	0	6

=== Draw 5 ===
Saturday, January 18, 9:00 am

Sheet 4	1	2	3	4	5	6	7	8	Final
(Scotland) Amy MacDonald	0	0	1	0	0	0	X	X	1
(Germany) Daniela Jentsch	0	1	0	2	2	2	X	X	7

Sheet 5	1	2	3	4	5	6	7	8	Final
(Switzerland) Irene Schori	0	0	0	1	1	3	0	3	8
(Scotland) Maggie Wilson	0	1	2	0	0	0	1	0	4

Sheet 6	1	2	3	4	5	6	7	8	Final
(Norway) Maia Ramsfjell	0	0	0	3	0	0	X	X	3
(Japan) Seina Nakajima	0	2	1	0	4	3	X	X	10

Sheet 7	1	2	3	4	5	6	7	8	Final
(Russia) Anna Sidorova	0	3	0	2	0	3	0	X	8
(China) Han Siyu	0	0	2	0	1	0	1	X	4

=== Draw 6 ===
Saturday, January 18, 12:30 pm

Sheet 4	1	2	3	4	5	6	7	8	Final
(Scotland) Fay Henderson	0	0	0	2	0	1	0	0	3
(South Korea) Kim Eun-jung	1	1	1	0	1	0	0	1	5

Sheet 5	1	2	3	4	5	6	7	8	Final
(China) Han Yu	1	2	0	1	0	3	0	X	7
(Scotland) Sophie Jackson	0	0	1	0	1	0	1	X	3

Sheet 6	1	2	3	4	5	6	7	8	Final
(Scotland) Lisa Davie	0	0	1	0	1	1	0	X	3
(Sweden) Isabella Wranå	2	1	0	2	0	0	3	X	8

Sheet 7	1	2	3	4	5	6	7	8	Final
(Switzerland) Binia Feltscher	0	1	0	1	0	2	0	4	8
(Switzerland) Selina Witschonke	1	0	2	0	2	0	1	0	6

== Playoffs ==
Quarterfinals
A1	(Russia) Anna Sidorova	6
D2	(China) Han Yu	3
C1	(Sweden) Isabella Wranå	7
B2	(Germany) Daniela Jentsch	6
B1	(Switzerland) Irene Schori	3
C2	(Switzerland) Binia Feltscher	5
D1	(South Korea) Kim Eun-jung	5
A2	(Japan) Seina Nakajima	4

Semifinals
A1	(Russia) Anna Sidorova	7
C1	(Sweden) Isabella Wranå	8
C2	(Switzerland) Binia Feltscher	7
D1	(South Korea) Kim Eun-jung	8

Final
C1	(Sweden) Isabella Wranå	3
D1	(South Korea) Kim Eun-jung	8

=== Quarterfinals ===
Saturday, January 18, 4:00 pm

Team	1	2	3	4	5	6	7	8	Final
(Russia) Anna Sidorova	0	2	0	2	0	2	0	X	6
(China) Han Yu	0	0	1	0	1	0	1	X	3

Team	1	2	3	4	5	6	7	8	Final
(Sweden) Isabella Wranå	0	0	5	0	0	1	0	1	7
(Germany) Daniela Jentsch	0	1	0	3	1	0	1	0	6

Team	1	2	3	4	5	6	7	8	Final
(Switzerland) Irene Schori	0	1	0	1	0	1	0	0	3
(Switzerland) Binia Feltscher	0	0	2	0	1	0	0	2	5

Team	1	2	3	4	5	6	7	8	Final
(South Korea) Kim Eun-jung	0	0	1	0	1	1	2	0	5
(Japan) Seina Nakajima	0	0	0	3	0	0	0	1	4

=== Semifinals ===
Sunday, January 19, 11:30 am

Team	1	2	3	4	5	6	7	8	Final
(Russia) Anna Sidorova	0	0	2	0	2	2	1	0	7
(Sweden) Isabella Wranå	0	3	0	3	0	0	0	2	8

Team	1	2	3	4	5	6	7	8	9	Final
(Switzerland) Binia Feltscher	0	3	0	2	0	1	0	1	0	7
(South Korea) Kim Eun-jung	0	0	2	0	2	0	3	0	1	8

=== Final ===
Sunday, January 19, 2:30 pm

Team	1	2	3	4	5	6	7	8	Final
(Sweden) Isabella Wranå	1	0	1	0	0	1	0	X	3
(South Korea) Kim Eun-jung	0	4	0	2	1	0	1	X	8

== Consolation ==
Quarterfinals
B3	(Scotland) Maggie Wilson	8
C4	(Scotland) Lisa Davie	4
D3	(Scotland) Sophie Jackson	5
A4	(China) Han Siyu	4
A3	(Norway) Maia Ramsfjell	2
D4	(Scotland) Fay Henderson	7
C3	(Switzerland) Selina Witschonke	6
B4	(Scotland) Amy MacDonald	5

Semifinals
B3	(Scotland) Maggie Wilson	5
D3	(Scotland) Sophie Jackson	3
D4	(Scotland) Fay Henderson	1
C3	(Switzerland) Selina Witschonke	8

Final
B3	(Scotland) Maggie Wilson	4
C3	(Switzerland) Selina Witschonke	5

=== Quarterfinals ===
Sunday, January 19, 8:30 am

Team	1	2	3	4	5	6	7	8	Final
(Scotland) Maggie Wilson	2	0	3	0	1	0	2	X	8
(Scotland) Lisa Davie	0	0	0	2	0	2	0	X	4

Team	1	2	3	4	5	6	7	8	Final
(Scotland) Sophie Jackson	0	1	0	1	2	0	1	0	5
(China) Han Siyu	0	0	1	0	0	3	0	0	4

Team	1	2	3	4	5	6	7	8	Final
(Norway) Maia Ramsfjell	0	2	0	0	0	0	X	X	2
(Scotland) Fay Henderson	2	0	1	2	1	1	X	X	7

Team	1	2	3	4	5	6	7	8	Final
(Switzerland) Selina Witschonke	2	1	0	1	0	1	0	1	6
(Scotland) Amy MacDonald	0	0	1	0	2	0	2	0	5

=== Semifinals ===
Sunday, January 19, 11:30 am

Team	1	2	3	4	5	6	7	8	Final
(Scotland) Maggie Wilson	0	0	1	0	1	1	1	1	5
(Scotland) Sophie Jackson	1	1	0	1	0	0	0	0	3

Team	1	2	3	4	5	6	7	8	Final
(Scotland) Fay Henderson	0	1	0	0	0	X	X	X	1
(Switzerland) Selina Witschonke	2	0	1	1	4	X	X	X	8

=== Final ===
Sunday, January 19, 2:30 pm

Team	1	2	3	4	5	6	7	8	Final
(Scotland) Maggie Wilson	0	0	1	0	0	3	0	X	4
(Switzerland) Selina Witschonke	0	2	0	1	1	0	1	X	5
