= 2023 Stu Sells Oakville Tankard =

- Host city: Oakville, Ontario
- Arena: Oakville Curling Club
- Dates: September 7–10
- Men's winner: (Scotland) Team Mouat
- Curling club: Gogar Park CC, Edinburgh
- Skip: Bruce Mouat
- Third: Grant Hardie
- Second: Bobby Lammie
- Lead: Hammy McMillan Jr.
- Coach: Michael Goodfellow
- Finalist: (Scotland) Ross Whyte
- Women's winner: (South Korea) Team Ha
- Curling club: Chuncheon CC, Chuncheon
- Skip: Ha Seung-youn
- Third: Kim Hye-rin
- Second: Yang Tae-i
- Lead: Kim Su-jin
- Coach: Lee Sung-jun
- Finalist: (Scotland) Rebecca Morrison

The 2023 Stu Sells Oakville Tankard was held from September 7 to 10 at the Oakville Curling Club in Oakville, Ontario. The event was held in a round robin format with a purse of $30,000 on both the men's and women's sides. It was the first Stu Sells sponsored event held as part of the 2023–24 season.

The 2023 event was dominated by the three Scottish teams in the field who all reached the final. The men's championship saw the reigning world champions Bruce Mouat rink, with Grant Hardie, Bobby Lammie and Hammy McMillan Jr. from Edinburgh defeat the Ross Whyte rink 6–2. Both teams entered the final with six straight wins in the event after going through the round robin undefeated. After Mouat got out to an early three-point lead, Whyte stole a single in the seventh to make the score 3–2 coming home where Bruce Mouat sealed the victory for his team. In the semifinals, Mouat won 5–1 over John Shuster while Whyte bested John Epping 7–2. It was the second final Mouat had won over Whyte to begin the 2023–24 season as he also won the 2023 Euro Super Series three weeks prior.

The lone Scottish women's team Rebecca Morrison also reached the final game where they fell 5–4 to South Korea's Ha Seung-youn rink from Chuncheon. Ha, with Kim Hye-rin, Yang Tae-i and Kim Su-jin took a single in an extra end to claim their first championship of the season. After winning the 2022 Korean Curling Championships to become the national team for the 2022–23 season, Chuncheon City Hall finished third at the 2023 championship, losing their title to Gyeonggi Province's Gim Eun-ji rink. The Ha rink advanced to the final after routing Delaney Strouse 7–0 while Morrison breezed past Tabitha Peterson 8–3 in the other semifinal game.

== Men ==
=== Teams ===
The teams are listed as follows:

Skip	Third	Second	Lead	Alternate	Locale
Reid Carruthers	Brad Jacobs	Derek Samagalski	Connor Njegovan		Winnipeg, Manitoba
Korey Dropkin (Fourth)	Andrew Stopera (Skip)	Mark Fenner	Thomas Howell		(United States) Duluth, Minnesota
John Epping	Mat Camm	Pat Janssen	Jason Camm		Toronto, Ontario
Pat Ferris	Landan Rooney	Connor Duhaime	Robert Currie	Evan Lilly	Grimsby, Ontario
Mike Fournier	Kevin Flewwelling	Sean Harrison	Zander Elmes		Toronto, Ontario
Daniel Hocevar	Kevin Genjaga	Joel Matthews	Jarrett Matthews		Toronto, Ontario
Tanner Horgan	Jacob Horgan	Ian McMillan	Scott Chadwick	Joey Hart	Sudbury, Ontario
Glenn Howard	Scott Howard	David Mathers	Tim March		Penetanguishene, Ontario
Mark Kean	Brady Lumley	Matthew Garner	Spencer Dunlop		Woodstock, Ontario
Jayden King	Dylan Niepage	Gavin Lydiate	Daniel Del Conte		Guelph, Ontario
Matthew Manuel	Luke Saunders	Jeffrey Meagher	Nick Zachernuk		Halifax, Nova Scotia
Jordan McNamara	Wesley Forget	Ryan Godfrey	Brendan Laframboise		Ottawa, Ontario
Sam Mooibroek	Scott Mitchell	Nathan Steele	Colin Schnurr	Wyatt Small	Whitby, Ontario
Bruce Mouat	Grant Hardie	Bobby Lammie	Hammy McMillan Jr.		Stirling, Scotland
Owen Purcell	Ryan Abraham	Scott Saccary	Adam McEachren		Halifax, Nova Scotia
Chris Ribeau	Eric Fenech	Allan Chaves	William Barbosa	Eric Just	Lisbon, Portugal
Rich Ruohonen	Jason Smith	Samuel Strouse	Jared Allen	Aidan Oldenburg	(United States) Minneapolis, Minnesota
Go Aoki (Fourth)	Hayato Sato (Skip)	Kouki Ogiwara	Kazushi Nino	Ayato Sasaki	Sapporo, Japan
John Shuster	Chris Plys	Matt Hamilton	John Landsteiner	Colin Hufman	(United States) Duluth, Minnesota
Greg Smith	Chris Ford	Zach Young	Zack Shurtleff	Adam Boland	St. John's, Newfoundland and Labrador
Warren Smith	Randy Mickevicius	Kevin Bontje	Scott Dewitt		Collingwood, Ontario
Cameron Goodkey (Fourth)	Sam Steep (Skip)	Thomas Ryan	Adam Vincent		Kitchener–Waterloo, Ontario
Diego Tompkins	Ismael Abreu	Chris Barajas	Mateo Tompkins		Mexico City, Mexico
Ross Whyte	Robin Brydone	Duncan McFadzean	Euan Kyle		Stirling, Scotland

=== Round robin standings ===
Final Round Robin Standings

Key
Teams to Quarterfinals
Teams to Qualification Games

Pool A	W	L	PF	PA
(Scotland) Bruce Mouat	4	0	26	8
(Nova Scotia) Owen Purcell	3	1	24	15
(Ontario) Sam Mooibroek	2	2	19	22
(Ontario) Tanner Horgan	2	2	29	24
(Newfoundland and Labrador) Greg Smith	1	3	20	20
(Mexico) Diego Tompkins	0	4	6	35

Pool B	W	L	PF	PA
(Scotland) Ross Whyte	4	0	31	15
(Ontario) Glenn Howard	3	1	36	15
(Ontario) Mike Fournier	2	2	26	18
(Ontario) Pat Ferris	2	2	20	26
(Ontario) Sam Steep	1	3	16	25
(Portugal) Chris Ribau	0	4	8	38

Pool C	W	L	PF	PA
(Ontario) John Epping	3	1	25	14
(United States) Team Dropkin	3	1	27	18
(Ontario) Jordan McNamara	3	1	21	18
(Nova Scotia) Matthew Manuel	2	2	19	22
(United States) Rich Ruohonen	1	3	17	19
(Ontario) Warren Smith	0	4	11	29

Pool D	W	L	PF	PA
(United States) John Shuster	4	0	30	7
(Manitoba) Reid Carruthers	3	1	17	15
(Ontario) Mark Kean	2	2	23	15
(Japan) Hayato Sato	2	2	20	16
(Ontario) Jayden King	1	3	8	26
(Ontario) Daniel Hocevar	0	4	10	29

=== Round robin results ===
All draw times are listed in Eastern Time (UTC−04:00).

==== Draw 1 ====
Thursday, September 7, 12:00 pm

Sheet 5	1	2	3	4	5	6	7	8	Final
(Scotland) Ross Whyte	2	0	2	0	2	3	X	X	9
(Ontario) Pat Ferris 🔨	0	1	0	3	0	0	X	X	4

Sheet 6	1	2	3	4	5	6	7	8	Final
(Japan) Hayato Sato 🔨	1	0	1	1	0	0	2	3	8
(Ontario) Daniel Hocevar	0	2	0	0	1	1	0	0	4

Sheet 7	1	2	3	4	5	6	7	8	Final
(Ontario) John Epping 🔨	0	2	0	2	0	4	X	X	8
(Ontario) Warren Smith	0	0	1	0	1	0	X	X	2

Sheet 8	1	2	3	4	5	6	7	8	Final
(Manitoba) Reid Carruthers 🔨	2	0	3	0	3	X	X	X	8
(Ontario) Jayden King	0	0	0	1	0	X	X	X	1

==== Draw 2 ====
Thursday, September 7, 3:00 pm

Sheet 1	1	2	3	4	5	6	7	8	Final
(Ontario) Glenn Howard	0	0	2	0	2	1	0	X	5
(Ontario) Sam Steep 🔨	0	0	0	1	0	0	1	X	2

Sheet 2	1	2	3	4	5	6	7	8	9	Final
(Ontario) Jordan McNamara	0	0	1	0	0	1	1	0	1	4
(United States) Rich Ruohonen 🔨	0	0	0	1	0	0	0	2	0	3

Sheet 3	1	2	3	4	5	6	7	8	Final
(Scotland) Bruce Mouat 🔨	2	3	0	0	0	4	X	X	9
(Nova Scotia) Owen Purcell	0	0	2	1	0	0	X	X	3

Sheet 4	1	2	3	4	5	6	7	8	Final
(United States) John Shuster	3	0	0	1	1	0	2	X	7
(Ontario) Mark Kean 🔨	0	2	0	0	0	1	0	X	3

==== Draw 3 ====
Friday, September 8, 8:00 am

Sheet 5	1	2	3	4	5	6	7	8	Final
(United States) Team Dropkin	0	1	0	1	2	0	2	X	6
(Nova Scotia) Matthew Manuel 🔨	0	0	1	0	0	2	0	X	3

Sheet 6	1	2	3	4	5	6	7	8	Final
(Ontario) Mike Fournier 🔨	0	4	2	2	2	X	X	X	10
(Portugal) Chris Ribau	1	0	0	0	0	X	X	X	1

Sheet 7	1	2	3	4	5	6	7	8	Final
(Newfoundland and Labrador) Greg Smith 🔨	1	0	3	4	0	2	X	X	10
(Mexico) Diego Tompkins	0	1	0	0	1	0	X	X	2

Sheet 8	1	2	3	4	5	6	7	8	9	Final
(Ontario) Sam Mooibroek 🔨	2	0	3	0	2	0	1	0	3	11
(Ontario) Tanner Horgan	0	2	0	2	0	3	0	1	0	8

==== Draw 4 ====
Friday, September 8, 11:00 am

Sheet 1	1	2	3	4	5	6	7	8	Final
(United States) Rich Ruohonen	1	3	0	0	2	1	X	X	7
(Ontario) Warren Smith 🔨	0	0	1	1	0	0	X	X	2

Sheet 2	1	2	3	4	5	6	7	8	Final
(Scotland) Ross Whyte 🔨	2	0	3	0	1	0	0	1	7
(Ontario) Glenn Howard	0	2	0	3	0	0	1	0	6

Sheet 3	1	2	3	4	5	6	7	8	Final
(Manitoba) Reid Carruthers 🔨	1	0	0	0	3	0	1	0	5
(Ontario) Mark Kean	0	0	0	1	0	1	0	1	3

Sheet 4	1	2	3	4	5	6	7	8	Final
(Ontario) John Epping 🔨	0	2	0	1	0	0	1	0	4
(Ontario) Jordan McNamara	1	0	0	0	0	1	0	1	3

==== Draw 5 ====
Friday, September 8, 2:00 pm

Sheet 2	1	2	3	4	5	6	7	8	Final
(Japan) Hayato Sato	0	2	0	2	1	0	2	X	7
(Ontario) Jayden King 🔨	2	0	1	0	0	1	0	X	4

Sheet 5	1	2	3	4	5	6	7	8	9	Final
(Scotland) Bruce Mouat 🔨	0	0	1	0	1	0	1	0	3	6
(Ontario) Tanner Horgan	0	0	0	0	0	2	0	1	0	3

Sheet 6	1	2	3	4	5	6	7	8	Final
(Nova Scotia) Owen Purcell 🔨	2	1	2	2	0	2	X	X	9
(Mexico) Diego Tompkins	0	0	0	0	1	0	X	X	1

Sheet 8	1	2	3	4	5	6	7	8	Final
(United States) John Shuster 🔨	2	1	2	2	0	3	X	X	10
(Ontario) Daniel Hocevar	0	0	0	0	1	0	0	X	1

==== Draw 6 ====
Friday, September 8, 5:00 pm

Sheet 1	1	2	3	4	5	6	7	8	Final
(Scotland) Ross Whyte 🔨	0	2	3	0	0	0	2	X	7
(Ontario) Mike Fournier	1	0	0	0	1	1	0	X	3

Sheet 3	1	2	3	4	5	6	7	8	Final
(Ontario) Pat Ferris	0	3	0	0	1	0	0	X	4
(Ontario) Glenn Howard 🔨	2	0	5	1	0	0	4	X	11

Sheet 4	1	2	3	4	5	6	7	8	Final
(Ontario) Sam Steep 🔨	3	1	3	0	2	0	X	X	9
(Portugal) Chris Ribau	0	0	0	1	0	1	X	X	2

Sheet 7	1	2	3	4	5	6	7	8	9	Final
(United States) Team Dropkin 🔨	0	2	0	2	3	0	0	0	0	7
(Ontario) Jordan McNamara	1	0	2	0	0	3	0	1	1	8

==== Draw 7 ====
Friday, September 8, 8:00 pm

Sheet 3	1	2	3	4	5	6	7	8	Final
(Ontario) John Epping 🔨	4	0	2	0	3	X	X	X	9
(Nova Scotia) Matthew Manuel	0	1	0	1	0	X	X	X	2

Sheet 6	1	2	3	4	5	6	7	8	Final
(Scotland) Bruce Mouat 🔨	0	1	1	0	0	2	0	X	4
(Ontario) Sam Mooibroek	0	0	0	1	0	0	0	X	1

Sheet 7	1	2	3	4	5	6	7	8	Final
(Manitoba) Reid Carruthers 🔨	0	1	1	0	0	1	0	1	4
(Japan) Hayato Sato	0	0	0	0	1	0	1	0	2

Sheet 8	1	2	3	4	5	6	7	8	Final
(Nova Scotia) Owen Purcell 🔨	1	0	1	0	0	0	0	2	4
(Newfoundland and Labrador) Greg Smith	0	1	0	2	0	0	0	0	3

==== Draw 8 ====
Saturday, September 9, 8:30 am

Sheet 2	1	2	3	4	5	6	7	8	Final
(Ontario) Tanner Horgan	0	2	2	4	3	X	X	X	11
(Mexico) Diego Tompkins 🔨	1	0	0	0	0	X	X	X	1

Sheet 4	1	2	3	4	5	6	7	8	Final
(Nova Scotia) Matthew Manuel 🔨	0	1	0	2	2	0	0	1	6
(United States) Rich Ruohonen	0	0	1	0	0	2	1	0	4

Sheet 5	1	2	3	4	5	6	7	8	Final
(Ontario) Mark Kean	3	2	2	2	X	X	X	X	9
(Ontario) Jayden King 🔨	0	0	0	0	X	X	X	X	0

Sheet 8	1	2	3	4	5	6	7	8	Final
(Ontario) Pat Ferris	1	1	0	2	0	1	0	X	5
(Portugal) Chris Ribau 🔨	0	0	1	0	1	0	1	X	3

==== Draw 9 ====
Saturday, September 9, 10:30 am

Sheet 1	1	2	3	4	5	6	7	8	Final
(United States) Team Dropkin	2	0	2	0	2	0	1	X	7
(Ontario) John Epping 🔨	0	1	0	2	0	1	0	X	4

Sheet 4	1	2	3	4	5	6	7	8	Final
(Scotland) Bruce Mouat	2	1	0	4	X	X	X	X	7
(Newfoundland and Labrador) Greg Smith 🔨	0	0	1	0	X	X	X	X	1

Sheet 5	1	2	3	4	5	6	7	8	Final
(Ontario) Sam Mooibroek 🔨	0	0	2	0	0	X	X	X	2
(Nova Scotia) Owen Purcell	2	2	0	3	1	X	X	X	8

Sheet 7	1	2	3	4	5	6	7	8	Final
(Scotland) Ross Whyte	2	0	4	0	2	X	X	X	8
(Ontario) Sam Steep 🔨	0	2	0	0	0	X	X	X	2

==== Draw 10 ====
Saturday, September 9, 2:00 pm

Sheet 1	1	2	3	4	5	6	7	8	Final
(Ontario) Mark Kean 🔨	0	2	0	0	4	2	X	X	8
(Ontario) Daniel Hocevar	1	0	0	2	0	0	X	X	3

Sheet 2	1	2	3	4	5	6	7	8	Final
(Manitoba) Reid Carruthers	0	0	0	X	X	X	X	X	0
(United States) John Shuster 🔨	4	0	5	X	X	X	X	X	9

Sheet 4	1	2	3	4	5	6	7	8	Final
(Ontario) Pat Ferris	0	1	0	2	2	2	X	X	7
(Ontario) Mike Fournier 🔨	1	0	2	0	0	0	X	X	3

Sheet 5	1	2	3	4	5	6	7	8	Final
(Ontario) Jordan McNamara	0	1	0	2	0	2	1	X	6
(Ontario) Warren Smith 🔨	2	0	1	0	1	0	0	X	4

==== Draw 11 ====
Saturday, September 9, 4:30 pm

Sheet 1	1	2	3	4	5	6	7	8	Final
(Ontario) Sam Mooibroek 🔨	1	3	0	0	0	1	0	X	5
(Mexico) Diego Tompkins	0	0	0	0	1	0	1	X	2

Sheet 3	1	2	3	4	5	6	7	8	Final
(United States) Team Dropkin	0	2	0	1	4	0	X	X	7
(United States) Rich Ruohonen 🔨	1	0	1	0	0	1	X	X	3

Sheet 6	1	2	3	4	5	6	7	8	9	Final
(Ontario) Tanner Horgan	0	0	0	2	0	0	4	0	1	7
(Newfoundland and Labrador) Greg Smith 🔨	2	0	1	0	1	1	0	1	0	6

Sheet 7	1	2	3	4	5	6	7	8	Final
(Ontario) Glenn Howard 🔨	4	0	1	3	0	6	X	X	14
(Portugal) Chris Ribau	0	1	0	0	1	0	X	X	2

==== Draw 12 ====
Saturday, September 9, 7:30 pm

Sheet 2	1	2	3	4	5	6	7	8	Final
(Nova Scotia) Matthew Manuel	1	2	0	0	0	5	X	X	8
(Ontario) Warren Smith 🔨	0	0	1	1	1	0	X	X	3

Sheet 4	1	2	3	4	5	6	7	8	Final
(Ontario) Jayden King	1	0	0	0	1	0	0	1	3
(Ontario) Daniel Hocevar 🔨	0	0	0	0	0	1	1	0	2

Sheet 5	1	2	3	4	5	6	7	8	Final
(United States) John Shuster	0	0	1	0	0	2	1	0	4
(Japan) Hayato Sato 🔨	1	0	0	0	1	0	0	1	3

Sheet 8	1	2	3	4	5	6	7	8	Final
(Ontario) Mike Fournier	2	0	3	1	2	2	X	X	10
(Ontario) Sam Steep 🔨	0	3	0	0	0	0	X	X	3

=== Playoffs ===
Qualification Games
8	(Nova Scotia) Owen Purcell	6
9	(Ontario) Jordan McNamara	2
5	(Manitoba) Reid Carruthers	2
12	(Ontario) Mike Fournier	6
6	(Ontario) Glenn Howard	3
11	(Ontario) Mark Kean	4
7	(United States) Team Dropkin	7
10	(Ontario) Sam Mooibroek	2

Quarterfinals
1	(Scotland) Ross Whyte	9
8	(Nova Scotia) Owen Purcell	4
4	(Ontario) John Epping	4
12	(Ontario) Mike Fournier	2
3	(United States) John Shuster	7
11	(Ontario) Mark Kean	1
2	(Scotland) Bruce Mouat	6
7	(United States) Team Dropkin	5

Semifinals
1	(Scotland) Ross Whyte	7
4	(Ontario) John Epping	2
3	(United States) John Shuster	1
2	(Scotland) Bruce Mouat	5

Final
1	(Scotland) Ross Whyte	2
2	(Scotland) Bruce Mouat	6

==== Qualification Games ====
Saturday, September 9, 10:00 pm

Sheet 1	1	2	3	4	5	6	7	8	Final
(Nova Scotia) Owen Purcell 🔨	0	0	4	1	1	0	X	X	6
(Ontario) Jordan McNamara	0	1	0	0	0	1	X	X	2

Sheet 3	1	2	3	4	5	6	7	8	Final
(Manitoba) Reid Carruthers 🔨	0	0	2	0	0	0	X	X	2
(Ontario) Mike Fournier	1	1	0	2	1	1	X	X	6

Sheet 6	1	2	3	4	5	6	7	8	Final
(Ontario) Glenn Howard 🔨	1	0	0	1	0	0	1	X	3
(Ontario) Mark Kean	0	2	0	0	1	1	0	X	4

Sheet 7	1	2	3	4	5	6	7	8	Final
(United States) Team Dropkin 🔨	2	0	1	0	2	2	X	X	7
(Ontario) Sam Mooibroek	0	1	0	1	0	0	X	X	2

==== Quarterfinals ====
Sunday, September 10, 8:30 am

Sheet 5	1	2	3	4	5	6	7	8	Final
(Scotland) Ross Whyte 🔨	0	2	0	0	3	0	4	X	9
(Nova Scotia) Owen Purcell	1	0	2	0	0	1	0	X	4

Sheet 6	1	2	3	4	5	6	7	8	Final
(Ontario) John Epping 🔨	2	0	0	0	0	1	1	0	4
(Ontario) Mike Fournier	0	1	0	0	0	0	0	1	2

Sheet 7	1	2	3	4	5	6	7	8	Final
(United States) John Shuster 🔨	3	0	2	1	1	X	X	X	7
(Ontario) Mark Kean	0	1	0	0	0	X	X	X	1

Sheet 8	1	2	3	4	5	6	7	8	9	Final
(Scotland) Bruce Mouat 🔨	0	3	0	1	0	0	1	0	1	6
(United States) Team Dropkin	1	0	2	0	0	1	0	1	0	5

==== Semifinals ====
Sunday, September 10, 12:00 pm

Sheet 2	1	2	3	4	5	6	7	8	Final
(United States) John Shuster	0	0	0	1	0	X	X	X	1
(Scotland) Bruce Mouat 🔨	2	1	2	0	0	X	X	X	5

Sheet 3	1	2	3	4	5	6	7	8	Final
(Scotland) Ross Whyte 🔨	2	0	2	1	0	2	X	X	7
(Ontario) John Epping	0	1	0	0	1	0	X	X	2

==== Final ====
Sunday, September 10, 3:30 pm

Sheet 6	1	2	3	4	5	6	7	8	Final
(Scotland) Ross Whyte 🔨	0	0	0	0	1	0	1	0	2
(Scotland) Bruce Mouat	1	2	0	0	0	0	0	3	6

== Women ==
=== Teams ===
The teams are listed as follows:

Skip	Third	Second	Lead	Alternate	Locale
Hailey Armstrong	Jessica Humphries	Michaela Robert	Terri Weeks	Grace Cave	Ottawa, Ontario
Courtney Auld	Chrissy Cadorin	Cayla Auld	Melanie Ebach	Leigh Armstrong	Thornhill, Ontario
Sarah Bailey	Katie Ford	Madison Fisher	Emily Middaugh		St. Catharines, Ontario
Christina Black	Jenn Baxter	Karlee Everist	Shelley Barker		Dartmouth, Nova Scotia
Chelsea Brandwood	Megan Smith	Brenda Chapman	Keira McLaughlin		Niagara Falls, Ontario
Jessica Daigle	Mary Myketyn-Driscoll	Marlee Powers	Lindsey Burgess		Halifax, Nova Scotia
Hollie Duncan	Megan Balsdon	Rachelle Strybosch	Tess Guyatt		Woodstock, Ontario
Ha Seung-youn	Kim Hye-rin	Yang Tae-i	Kim Su-jin		Chuncheon, South Korea
Shelley Hardy	Stephanie Mumford	Jessica Corrado	Stephanie Corrado		Sarnia, Ontario
Carly Howard	Allison Flaxey	Lynn Kreviazuk	Laura Hickey		Toronto, Ontario
Danielle Inglis	Kira Brunton	Calissa Daly	Cassandra de Groot		Ottawa, Ontario
Kaitlin Jewer	Breanna Rozon	Kristina Brauch	Audrey de Sousa		Peterborough, Ontario
Kim Eun-jung	Kim Kyeong-ae	Kim Cho-hi	Kim Seon-yeong	Kim Yeong-mi	Gangneung, South Korea
Isabelle Ladouceur	Grace Lloyd	Jamie Smith	Rachel Steele		Whitby, Ontario
Lauren Mann	Stephanie Barbeau	Abby Deschene	Candice Jackson		Timmins, Ontario
Rebecca Morrison	Jennifer Dodds	Sophie Sinclair	Sophie Jackson	Gina Aitken	Stirling, Scotland
Tabitha Peterson	Cory Thiesse	Becca Hamilton	Tara Peterson		(United States) St. Paul, Minnesota
Stephanie Senneker	Nicole Prohaska	Toni Paisley	Melissa Turbow	Sere Politano	(United States) Port Huron, Michigan
Delaney Strouse	Anne O'Hara	Sydney Mullaney	Rebecca Rodgers	Susan Dudt	(United States) Traverse City, Michigan
Quinn Walsh	Brooke Davies	Mackenzie Cryderman	Melissa Retz		Oshawa, Ontario
Katelyn Wasylkiw	Lauren Wasylkiw	Stephanie Thompson	Alice Holyoke		Milton, Ontario
Kristy Watling	Laura Burtnyk	Emily Deschenes	Sarah Pyke		Winnipeg, Manitoba
Yuna Kotani (Note: As skip Sayaka Yoshimura was on maternity leave, the rest of the team moved up the lineup a position.)	Kaho Onodera	Anna Ohmiya	Mina Kobayashi		Sapporo, Japan
Tori Zemmelink	Emma Artichuk	Lauren Rajala	Katie Shaw		Guelph, Ontario

=== Round robin standings ===
Final Round Robin Standings

Key
Teams to Quarterfinals
Teams to Qualification Games

Pool A	W	L	PF	PA
(Ontario) Danielle Inglis	4	0	31	14
(United States) Tabitha Peterson	3	1	31	12
(United States) Delaney Strouse	2	2	27	18
(Ontario) Chelsea Brandwood	2	2	18	24
(Ontario) Kaitlin Jewer	1	3	16	25
(Ontario) Quinn Walsh	0	4	7	37

Pool B	W	L	PF	PA
(South Korea) Kim Eun-jung	4	0	34	10
(Nova Scotia) Christina Black	2	2	26	16
(Ontario) Carly Howard	2	2	15	24
(Manitoba) Kristy Watling	2	2	22	31
(Ontario) Katelyn Wasylkiw	2	2	29	22
(United States) Stephanie Senneker	0	4	10	33

Pool C	W	L	PF	PA
(South Korea) Ha Seung-youn	3	1	26	12
(Ontario) Isabelle Ladouceur	3	1	19	19
(Ontario) Shelley Hardy	2	2	20	19
(Nova Scotia) Jessica Daigle	2	2	21	17
(Ontario) Lauren Mann	1	3	21	24
(Ontario) Tori Zemmelink	1	3	12	28

Pool D	W	L	PF	PA
(Scotland) Rebecca Morrison	3	1	20	12
(Japan) Team Yoshimura	3	1	34	8
(Ontario) Hailey Armstrong	2	2	11	24
(Ontario) Hollie Duncan	2	2	13	22
(Ontario) Sarah Bailey	1	3	17	20
(Ontario) Courtney Auld	1	3	14	23

=== Round robin results ===
All draw times are listed in Eastern Time (UTC−04:00).

==== Draw 1 ====
Thursday, September 7, 12:00 pm

Sheet 1	1	2	3	4	5	6	7	8	Final
(South Korea) Ha Seung-youn 🔨	2	0	2	2	0	3	X	X	9
(Ontario) Tori Zemmelink	0	1	0	0	1	0	X	X	2

Sheet 2	1	2	3	4	5	6	7	8	Final
(Nova Scotia) Christina Black 🔨	1	0	1	0	2	3	4	X	11
(Manitoba) Kristy Watling	0	1	0	2	0	0	0	X	3

Sheet 3	1	2	3	4	5	6	7	8	Final
(Scotland) Rebecca Morrison 🔨	0	1	1	0	2	0	1	0	5
(Japan) Team Yoshimura	0	0	0	3	0	0	0	1	4

Sheet 4	1	2	3	4	5	6	7	8	Final
(United States) Delaney Strouse 🔨	0	2	4	0	4	0	X	X	10
(Ontario) Quinn Walsh	1	0	0	1	0	1	X	X	3

==== Draw 2 ====
Thursday, September 7, 3:00 pm

Sheet 5	1	2	3	4	5	6	7	8	Final
(South Korea) Kim Eun-jung	0	1	3	1	4	1	X	X	10
(United States) Stephanie Senneker 🔨	1	0	0	0	0	0	X	X	1

Sheet 6	1	2	3	4	5	6	7	8	Final
(Ontario) Sarah Bailey	0	0	1	1	1	0	1	X	4
(Ontario) Courtney Auld 🔨	1	1	0	0	0	4	0	X	6

Sheet 7	1	2	3	4	5	6	7	8	9	Final
(United States) Tabitha Peterson 🔨	0	1	0	1	0	2	0	2	0	6
(Ontario) Danielle Inglis	0	0	4	0	1	0	1	0	1	7

Sheet 8	1	2	3	4	5	6	7	8	Final
(Ontario) Shelley Hardy 🔨	0	0	0	2	0	4	0	X	6
(Ontario) Lauren Mann	0	0	0	0	2	0	2	X	4

==== Draw 3 ====
Friday, September 8, 8:00 am

Sheet 1	1	2	3	4	5	6	7	8	Final
(Scotland) Rebecca Morrison 🔨	0	1	0	0	0	0	0	X	1
(Ontario) Hollie Duncan	0	0	1	0	1	1	1	X	4

Sheet 2	1	2	3	4	5	6	7	8	Final
(Ontario) Carly Howard 🔨	2	0	1	1	0	3	0	X	7
(Ontario) Katelyn Wasylkiw	0	0	0	0	4	0	2	X	6

Sheet 3	1	2	3	4	5	6	7	8	Final
(Ontario) Isabelle Ladouceur 🔨	1	0	2	1	1	0	0	1	6
(Nova Scotia) Jessica Daigle	0	1	0	0	0	0	2	0	3

Sheet 4	1	2	3	4	5	6	7	8	Final
(Ontario) Chelsea Brandwood	0	2	0	2	0	2	1	X	7
(Ontario) Kaitlin Jewer 🔨	1	0	1	0	1	0	0	X	3

==== Draw 4 ====
Friday, September 8, 11:00 am

Sheet 5	1	2	3	4	5	6	7	8	Final
(Ontario) Shelley Hardy 🔨	2	0	2	0	5	X	X	X	9
(Ontario) Tori Zemmelink	0	1	0	1	0	X	X	X	2

Sheet 6	1	2	3	4	5	6	7	8	Final
(Ontario) Danielle Inglis 🔨	2	2	1	0	4	X	X	X	9
(Ontario) Quinn Walsh	0	0	0	1	0	X	X	X	1

Sheet 7	1	2	3	4	5	6	7	8	Final
(Japan) Team Yoshimura 🔨	0	2	5	3	1	X	X	X	11
(Ontario) Hailey Armstrong	0	0	0	0	0	X	X	X	0

Sheet 8	1	2	3	4	5	6	7	8	Final
(Nova Scotia) Christina Black	0	1	0	1	0	0	1	0	3
(South Korea) Kim Eun-jung 🔨	1	0	2	0	1	0	0	1	5

==== Draw 5 ====
Friday, September 8, 2:00 pm

Sheet 1	1	2	3	4	5	6	7	8	Final
(Manitoba) Kristy Watling 🔨	1	1	1	0	2	0	1	2	8
(United States) Stephanie Senneker	0	0	0	1	0	2	0	0	3

Sheet 3	1	2	3	4	5	6	7	8	Final
(Ontario) Courtney Auld	0	0	1	0	2	0	0	X	3
(Ontario) Hollie Duncan 🔨	1	2	0	1	0	1	1	X	6

Sheet 4	1	2	3	4	5	6	7	8	Final
(United States) Delaney Strouse 🔨	2	0	0	0	3	4	X	X	9
(Ontario) Chelsea Brandwood	0	1	1	0	0	0	X	X	2

Sheet 7	1	2	3	4	5	6	7	8	Final
(Nova Scotia) Jessica Daigle 🔨	0	2	0	2	0	0	2	0	6
(Ontario) Lauren Mann	1	0	1	0	2	0	0	4	8

==== Draw 6 ====
Friday, September 8, 5:00 pm

Sheet 2	1	2	3	4	5	6	7	8	Final
(Ontario) Hailey Armstrong 🔨	0	0	1	1	0	2	1	0	5
(Ontario) Sarah Bailey	0	0	0	0	2	0	0	1	3

Sheet 5	1	2	3	4	5	6	7	8	Final
(South Korea) Ha Seung-youn 🔨	1	0	3	0	4	X	X	X	8
(Ontario) Isabelle Ladouceur	0	1	0	1	0	X	X	X	2

Sheet 6	1	2	3	4	5	6	7	8	Final
(South Korea) Kim Eun-jung 🔨	3	2	0	3	X	X	X	X	8
(Ontario) Carly Howard	0	0	2	0	X	X	X	X	2

Sheet 8	1	2	3	4	5	6	7	8	Final
(Ontario) Kaitlin Jewer 🔨	0	3	1	0	1	0	4	X	9
(Ontario) Quinn Walsh	0	0	0	1	0	1	0	X	2

==== Draw 7 ====
Friday, September 8, 8:00 pm

Sheet 1	1	2	3	4	5	6	7	8	Final
(Japan) Team Yoshimura 🔨	0	2	0	6	0	X	X	X	8
(Ontario) Courtney Auld	0	0	1	0	1	X	X	X	2

Sheet 2	1	2	3	4	5	6	7	8	9	Final
(Ontario) Tori Zemmelink	0	1	0	2	0	0	1	0	2	6
(Ontario) Lauren Mann 🔨	0	0	1	0	0	2	0	1	0	4

Sheet 4	1	2	3	4	5	6	7	8	Final
(Ontario) Katelyn Wasylkiw	0	3	1	0	2	4	X	X	10
(United States) Stephanie Senneker 🔨	2	0	0	1	0	0	X	X	3

Sheet 5	1	2	3	4	5	6	7	8	9	Final
(United States) Tabitha Peterson 🔨	0	1	0	0	0	3	1	0	1	6
(United States) Delaney Strouse	1	0	0	2	0	0	0	2	0	5

==== Draw 8 ====
Saturday, September 9, 8:30 am

Sheet 1	1	2	3	4	5	6	7	8	Final
(Ontario) Danielle Inglis 🔨	1	1	0	2	0	3	1	X	8
(Ontario) Kaitlin Jewer	0	0	2	0	2	0	0	X	4

Sheet 3	1	2	3	4	5	6	7	8	Final
(Ontario) Hollie Duncan	0	0	1	1	0	0	0	X	2
(Ontario) Sarah Bailey 🔨	3	0	0	0	1	1	2	X	7

Sheet 6	1	2	3	4	5	6	7	8	Final
(South Korea) Ha Seung-youn	0	0	1	0	0	0	X	X	1
(Nova Scotia) Jessica Daigle 🔨	1	1	0	2	1	1	X	X	6

Sheet 7	1	2	3	4	5	6	7	8	Final
(South Korea) Kim Eun-jung 🔨	0	5	0	2	4	X	X	X	11
(Manitoba) Kristy Watling	0	0	4	0	0	X	X	X	4

==== Draw 9 ====
Saturday, September 9, 10:30 am

Sheet 2	1	2	3	4	5	6	7	8	Final
(Ontario) Isabelle Ladouceur 🔨	1	0	2	0	1	1	0	X	5
(Ontario) Shelley Hardy	0	1	0	1	0	0	1	X	3

Sheet 3	1	2	3	4	5	6	7	8	Final
(Nova Scotia) Christina Black	0	0	1	1	2	1	0	X	5
(Ontario) Katelyn Wasylkiw 🔨	2	2	0	0	0	0	3	X	7

Sheet 6	1	2	3	4	5	6	7	8	Final
(Scotland) Rebecca Morrison 🔨	0	1	1	0	0	2	3	X	7
(Ontario) Hailey Armstrong	0	0	0	1	0	0	0	X	1

Sheet 8	1	2	3	4	5	6	7	8	Final
(United States) Tabitha Peterson 🔨	2	3	5	1	X	X	X	X	11
(Ontario) Chelsea Brandwood	0	0	0	0	X	X	X	X	0

==== Draw 10 ====
Saturday, September 9, 2:00 pm

Sheet 3	1	2	3	4	5	6	7	8	Final
(Ontario) Carly Howard 🔨	1	1	0	0	0	2	0	1	5
(United States) Stephanie Senneker	0	0	0	1	1	0	1	0	3

Sheet 6	1	2	3	4	5	6	7	8	Final
(Japan) Team Yoshimura 🔨	2	3	0	1	5	X	X	X	11
(Ontario) Hollie Duncan	0	0	1	0	0	X	X	X	1

Sheet 7	1	2	3	4	5	6	7	8	Final
(Nova Scotia) Jessica Daigle 🔨	0	0	2	0	2	2	X	X	6
(Ontario) Tori Zemmelink	1	0	0	1	0	0	X	X	2

Sheet 8	1	2	3	4	5	6	7	8	Final
(United States) Delaney Strouse 🔨	1	0	0	1	0	1	0	X	3
(Ontario) Danielle Inglis	0	2	2	0	2	0	1	X	7

==== Draw 11 ====
Saturday, September 9, 4:30 pm

Sheet 2	1	2	3	4	5	6	7	8	Final
(United States) Tabitha Peterson 🔨	4	1	3	X	X	X	X	X	8
(Ontario) Kaitlin Jewer	0	0	0	X	X	X	X	X	0

Sheet 4	1	2	3	4	5	6	7	8	Final
(South Korea) Ha Seung-youn	0	2	0	2	2	2	X	X	8
(Ontario) Shelley Hardy 🔨	1	0	1	0	0	0	X	X	2

Sheet 5	1	2	3	4	5	6	7	8	Final
(Manitoba) Kristy Watling	1	1	0	0	2	0	0	3	7
(Ontario) Katelyn Wasylkiw 🔨	0	0	2	2	0	1	1	0	6

Sheet 8	1	2	3	4	5	6	7	8	Final
(Scotland) Rebecca Morrison 🔨	1	0	2	0	1	1	2	X	7
(Ontario) Sarah Bailey	0	1	0	2	0	0	0	X	3

==== Draw 12 ====
Saturday, September 9, 7:30 pm

Sheet 1	1	2	3	4	5	6	7	8	Final
(Nova Scotia) Christina Black 🔨	1	0	2	1	1	2	X	X	7
(Ontario) Carly Howard	0	1	0	0	0	0	X	X	1

Sheet 3	1	2	3	4	5	6	7	8	Final
(Ontario) Hailey Armstrong	1	0	0	1	0	0	1	2	5
(Ontario) Courtney Auld 🔨	0	1	1	0	1	0	0	0	3

Sheet 6	1	2	3	4	5	6	7	8	Final
(Ontario) Isabelle Ladouceur 🔨	2	0	1	0	1	0	1	1	6
(Ontario) Lauren Mann	0	3	0	1	0	1	0	0	5

Sheet 7	1	2	3	4	5	6	7	8	Final
(Ontario) Chelsea Brandwood 🔨	3	4	0	0	1	1	X	X	9
(Ontario) Quinn Walsh	0	0	1	0	0	0	X	X	1

=== Playoffs ===
Qualification Games
8	(Ontario) Shelley Hardy	5
9	(United States) Delaney Strouse	6
5	(Ontario) Isabelle Ladouceur	6
12	(Nova Scotia) Christina Black	7
6	(Japan) Team Yoshimura	6
11	(Ontario) Hollie Duncan	4
7	(United States) Tabitha Peterson	7
10	(Ontario) Hailey Armstrong	4

Quarterfinals
1	(South Korea) Kim Eun-jung	3
9	(United States) Delaney Strouse	5
4	(South Korea) Ha Seung-youn	6
12	(Nova Scotia) Christina Black	3
3	(Scotland) Rebecca Morrison	5
6	(Japan) Team Yoshimura	3
2	(Ontario) Danielle Inglis	2
7	(United States) Tabitha Peterson	9

Semifinals
9	(United States) Delaney Strouse	0
4	(South Korea) Ha Seung-youn	7
3	(Scotland) Rebecca Morrison	8
7	(United States) Tabitha Peterson	3

Final
4	(South Korea) Ha Seung-youn	5
3	(Scotland) Rebecca Morrison	4

==== Qualification Games ====
Saturday, September 9, 10:00 pm

Sheet 2	1	2	3	4	5	6	7	8	Final
(Ontario) Shelley Hardy 🔨	1	0	0	2	0	1	0	1	5
(United States) Delaney Strouse	0	1	2	0	0	0	3	0	6

Sheet 4	1	2	3	4	5	6	7	8	Final
(Ontario) Isabelle Ladouceur 🔨	1	0	1	0	3	0	1	X	6
(Nova Scotia) Christina Black	0	1	0	4	0	2	0	X	7

Sheet 5	1	2	3	4	5	6	7	8	Final
(Japan) Team Yoshimura 🔨	1	0	2	1	0	2	0	X	6
(Ontario) Hollie Duncan	0	1	0	0	1	0	2	X	4

Sheet 8	1	2	3	4	5	6	7	8	Final
(United States) Tabitha Peterson 🔨	1	1	0	2	0	2	1	X	7
(Ontario) Hailey Armstrong	0	0	1	0	3	0	0	X	4

==== Quarterfinals ====
Sunday, September 10, 8:30 am

Sheet 1	1	2	3	4	5	6	7	8	Final
(Scotland) Rebecca Morrison	0	2	0	0	1	0	0	2	5
(Japan) Team Yoshimura 🔨	0	0	0	2	0	1	0	0	3

Sheet 2	1	2	3	4	5	6	7	8	Final
(Ontario) Danielle Inglis 🔨	0	0	0	1	0	1	0	X	2
(United States) Tabitha Peterson	1	1	3	0	1	0	3	X	9

Sheet 3	1	2	3	4	5	6	7	8	Final
(South Korea) Kim Eun-jung 🔨	1	0	2	0	0	0	0	0	3
(United States) Delaney Strouse	0	1	0	1	1	1	0	1	5

Sheet 4	1	2	3	4	5	6	7	8	Final
(South Korea) Ha Seung-youn 🔨	0	0	0	2	2	2	0	X	6
(Nova Scotia) Christina Black	1	0	2	0	0	0	0	X	3

==== Semifinals ====
Sunday, September 10, 12:00 pm

Sheet 5	1	2	3	4	5	6	7	8	Final
(United States) Delaney Strouse	0	0	0	0	X	X	X	X	0
(South Korea) Ha Seung-youn 🔨	0	5	1	1	X	X	X	X	7

Sheet 6	1	2	3	4	5	6	7	8	Final
(Scotland) Rebecca Morrison 🔨	2	0	0	3	0	2	1	X	8
(United States) Tabitha Peterson	0	0	1	0	2	0	0	X	3

==== Final ====
Sunday, September 10, 3:30 pm

Sheet 3	1	2	3	4	5	6	7	8	9	Final
(South Korea) Ha Seung-youn	0	1	0	0	1	0	2	0	1	5
(Scotland) Rebecca Morrison 🔨	0	0	1	0	0	2	0	1	0	4
