= Laura Watt =

Scottish curler (born 2004)

- Curler
- Born: May 6, 2004 (age 22); Stirling, Scotland

Team
- Curling club: Dumfries Ice Bowl, Dumfries, SCO
- Skip: Fay Henderson
- Third: Lisa Davie
- Second: Laura Watt
- Lead: Katie McMillan
- Alternate: Sophie Sinclair

Curling career
- Member Association: Scotland; Great Britain
- World Championship: 1 (2026)
- European Championship: 1 (2026)
- World Junior Curling Championship: 2 (2023, 2024)
Medal record
Curling
Representing Scotland
World Junior Curling Championships
Gold medal – first place	2023 Füssen
Scottish Women's Championship
Gold medal – first place	2026 Dumfries
Bronze medal – third place	2024 Dumfries
Bronze medal – third place	2025 Dumfries
Scottish Mixed Doubles Championship
Bronze medal – third place	2026 Aberdeen

Laura Watt (born May 6, 2004 in Stirling) is a Scottish curler from Auchterarder. She currently plays second on Team Fay Henderson.

== Career ==
=== Juniors ===
Watt and her junior team skipped by Amy Bryce won the 2020 Scottish Junior Curling Championships, however, did not participate in the 2020 World Junior Curling Championships as Scotland failed to qualify. For the 2022–23 season, she teamed up with Fay Henderson to win the junior title again. This qualified the team of Henderson, Robyn Munro, Holly Wilkie-Milne and Watt for the 2022 World Junior-B Curling Championships where they went undefeated until the final before losing to Canada's Emily Deschenes. Still, this silver medal was good enough to send the team to the 2023 World Junior Curling Championships where they continued to find success, qualifying for the playoffs as the third seeds with a 6–3 record. They then knocked off Norway in the semifinals before stealing a victory over Japan to claim the gold medal. Also during the 2022–23 season, Team Henderson represented Great Britain at the 2023 Winter World University Games. After a 7–2 record in the round robin, the team lost in the semifinal and bronze medal game, finishing fourth.

After Henderson aged out of juniors, Watt joined the newly formed Robyn Munro rink with Lisa Davie and Holly Wilkie-Milne. With this team, Watt won her third Scottish junior title. Competing at the 2024 World Junior Curling Championships, the team finished in ninth place with a 3–6 record. Also during the season, Team Munro saw slight success on the women's tour with semifinal appearances at the 2023 Euro Super Series and Danish Open as well as a quarterfinal appearance at the 2024 Mercure Perth Masters. At the 2024 Scottish Women's Curling Championship, they made it to the semifinal round where they lost to Rebecca Morrison, earning a bronze medal.

In 2025, Watt was the skip off the British team that competed at the 2025 Winter World University Games. There, she led the team to a 4–5 record, missing the playoffs. Later that year, her team had another bronze medal performance at the Scottish women's championship.

=== Women's ===
Out of juniors, Watt rejoined former skip Fay Henderson on a team that also included Lisa Davie, Hailey Duff and Katie McMillan. On tour, the team finished runner-up at the WCT Tallinn Ladies Challenger and reached one additional semifinal at the 2025 Tour Challenge U25 Grand Slam of Curling event. They also played in the Tier 2 side of the 2025 Masters, however, they finished 0–4. In the new year, the team turned things around with an undefeated run to capture the Scottish women's crown, Watt's first time winning the event. They were later chosen to represent Scotland at the 2026 World Women's Curling Championship as Team Rebecca Morrison was ineligible due to competing at the 2026 Winter Olympics.

=== Mixed doubles ===
In 2026, Watt teamed up with Kyle Waddell to compete in the Scottish Mixed Doubles Curling Championship. There, the pair had a strong run, qualifying for the playoffs before losing in the semifinal to eventual champions Katie McMillan and Angus Bryce.

== Personal life ==
At the time of the 2026 World Championships, Watt was studying sports therapy and rehabilitation at UHI Perth. She previously attended the Community School of Auchterarder. Her father Iain Watt won silver at the 1990 World Junior Curling Championships and her brother Mark Watt won gold at the 2023 Winter World University Games.

== Teams ==
Season	Skip	Third	Second	Lead	Alternate
2018–19	Robyn Munro	Laura Watt	Inca Maguire	Karlyn Lyon	
2019–20	Amy Bryce	Robyn Munro	Inca Maguire	Laura Watt	Beth Rowley
2020–21	Lisa Davie	Robyn Munro	Robyn Mitchell	Laura Watt	
2021–22	Beth Farmer	Kirstin Bousie	Emma Barr	Laura Watt	Robyn Munro
2022–23	Fay Henderson	Robyn Munro	Holly Wilkie-Milne	Laura Watt	
2023–24	Robyn Munro	Lisa Davie	Holly Wilkie-Milne	Laura Watt	Amy Mitchell
2024–25	Laura Watt	Amy Mitchell	Holly Wilkie-Milne	Robyn Mitchell	Tamzin Smith
2025–26	Fay Henderson	Lisa Davie	Hailey Duff	Katie McMillan	Laura Watt
2026–27	Fay Henderson	Lisa Davie	Laura Watt	Katie McMillan	Sophie Sinclair
