= Hailey Duff =

Scottish curler (born 1997)

Hailey Duff MBE
- Curler
- Born: 24 January 1997 (age 29); Auckland, New Zealand

Team
- Curling club: Curl Aberdeen, Aberdeen, Forfar CC, Forfar

Curling career
- Member Association: Scotland; Great Britain
- World Championship: 1 (2026)
- European Championship: 2 (2021, 2022)
- Olympic: 1 (2022)
- Other appearances: World Junior Curling Championships: 1 (2018)
Medal record
Women's curling
Representing Great Britain
Olympic Games
Gold medal – first place	2022 Beijing
Representing Scotland
European Championships
Gold medal – first place	2021 Lillehammer
Bronze medal – third place	2022 Östersund
Scottish Women's Championship
Gold medal – first place	2024 Dumfries
Gold medal – first place	2025 Dumfries
Gold medal – first place	2026 Aberdeen
Bronze medal – third place	2019 Perth
Scottish Mixed Doubles Championship
Bronze medal – third place	2015 Glasgow
Bronze medal – third place	2022 Perth

Hailey Caitlin Rose Duff MBE (born 24 January 1997) is a Scottish curler from Forfar. She is the 2022 Olympic Champion in women's curling.

At the international level, she is a 2021 European champion, playing lead for skip Eve Muirhead.

At the national level, she is a Scottish women's championship champion (2024) and bronze medallist (2019), Scottish mixed doubles championship bronze medallist (2015), Scottish junior champion (2018) and silver medallist (2016, 2017).

Duff was appointed Member of the Order of the British Empire (MBE) in the 2022 Birthday Honours for services to curling.

== Personal life ==
Hailey Duff was born and grew up in New Zealand. Some years later her family moved to Scotland.

She is from family of curlers. Her father John Duff is a long time curler, and was the runner-up at the 2020 Scottish Senior Championships, and is a bronze medallist with his daughter at the 2015 Scottish Mixed Doubles Championship.)

Duff works as an assistant buyer at Garden Furniture Scotland and is also studying sport and fitness at The Open University.

She graduated from the University of Stirling in 2019 with a degree in Business and Finance.

She currently lives in Edinburgh.

== Teams ==
=== Women's ===
Season	Skip	Third	Second	Lead	Alternate	Coach	Events
2013–14	Lesley Young	Alison Wood	Hailey Duff	Ellie Fraser	Susan Kesley		SJCC 2014 (4th)
2014–15	Katie Murray	Sophie Jackson	Hailey Duff	Ellie Fraser			SJCC (8th); SWCC 2015 (6th)
2015–16	Katie Murray	Rebecca Morrison	Hailey Duff	Mili Smith		Andrew Craigie	SJCC 2016 (silver)
2015–16	Katie Murray	Rebecca Morrison	Hailey Duff	Leeanne McKenzie		Andrew Craigie	SWCC 2016 (4th)
2016–17	Karina Aitken	Rebecca Morrison	Hailey Duff	Laura Barr		David Aitken	SJCC 2017 (silver); SWCC 2017 (4th)
2017–18	Rebecca Morrison	Amy MacDonald	Hailey Duff	Leeanne McKenzie	Sophie Jackson (WJCC)	Tom Andrews	SJCC 2018 (gold); WJCC 2018 (9th); SWCC 2018 (5th)
2018–19	Rebecca Morrison	Hailey Duff	Lisa Davie	Beth Dandie			
2018–19	Rebecca Morrison	Hailey Duff	Leeanne McKenzie	Beth Dandie		Paul Davis	SWCC 2019 (bronze)
2019–20	Amy MacDonald	Hailey Duff	Rebecca Morrison	Layle Al-Saffar			
2019–20	Hailey Duff (fourth)	Amy MacDonald (skip)	Layle Al-Saffar	Jane Barr	Rachael Halliday	Paul Davis	SWCC 2020 (4th)
2020–21	Maggie Wilson	Hailey Duff	Jennifer Marshall	Eilidh Yeats			
2021–22	Eve Muirhead	Vicky Wright	Jennifer Dodds	Hailey Duff	Mili Smith	Kristian Lindström, David Murdoch (NC)	ECC 2021 (gold)
2022–23	Beth Farmer	Hailey Duff	Kirstin Bousie	Amy MacDonald	Katie McMillan	David Murdoch	SWCC 2023 (4th)
2023–24	Fay Henderson	Hailey Duff	Amy MacDonald	Katie McMillan		Eve Muirhead	SWCC 2024 (gold)
2024–25	Fay Henderson	Robyn Munro	Hailey Duff	Katie McMillan	Lisa Davie	Clancy Grandy	SWCC 2025 (gold)
2025–26	Fay Henderson	Lisa Davie	Hailey Duff	Katie McMillan	Laura Watt	Clancy Grandy	SWCC 2026 (gold); WWCC 2026 (10th)

=== Mixed ===
Season	Skip	Third	Second	Lead	Events
2016–17	Robin Brydone	Hailey Duff	Robin McCall	Laura Barr	SMxCC 2017 (5th)

=== Mixed doubles ===
Season	Male	Female	Events
2015–16	John Duff	Hailey Duff	SMDCC 2015 (bronze)
2016–17	John Duff	Hailey Duff	SMDCC 2016 (7th)
2017–18	John Duff	Hailey Duff	SMDCC 2017 (16th)
2018–19	John Duff	Hailey Duff	SMDCC 2018 (7th)
