= Glynhill Ladies International =

World Curling Tour event

- Established: 2008
- Host city: Renfrew, Glasgow, Scotland
- Arena: Braehead Curling Rink
- Purse: £ 10,600
- 2020 champion: (South Korea) Kim Eun-jung

Current edition
- 2020 Glynhill Ladies International

The Glynhill Ladies International (formerly the Braehead Ladies International) is an annual bonspiel, or curling tournament, that takes place at the Braehead Curling Rink in Renfrew, Scotland, just outside Glasgow. The tournament, sponsored by Glynhill Hotel, has been a part of the World Curling Tour since 2008. The tournament is held in a round robin format.

== Past champions ==
Only skip's name is displayed.

Year	Winning team	Runner up team	Purse (GBP)
2008	(Scotland) Gail Munro	(Scotland) Kelly Wood	
2009	(Canada) Jennifer Jones	(Switzerland) Binia Feltscher-Beeli	8,000
2010	(Switzerland) Mirjam Ott	(Scotland) Eve Muirhead	
2011	(Sweden) Anna Hasselborg	(Switzerland) Mirjam Ott	8,000
2012	(Switzerland) Mirjam Ott	(Switzerland) Michèle Jäggi	8,200
2013	(Switzerland) Binia Feltscher	(Canada) Heather Nedohin	8,200
2014	(China) Wang Bingyu	(Switzerland) Mirjam Ott	8,200
2015	(Russia) Anna Sidorova	(South Korea) Kim Eun-jung	9,000
2016	(Switzerland) Silvana Tirinzoni	(Sweden) Margaretha Sigfridsson	9,000
2017	(Scotland) Eve Muirhead	(Switzerland) Alina Pätz	10,600
2018	(Switzerland) Binia Feltscher	(Switzerland) Elena Stern	10,600
2019	(Switzerland) Ursi Hegner	(Switzerland) Elena Stern	11,000
2020	(South Korea) Kim Eun-jung	(Sweden) Isabella Wranå	10,600
2021	Cancelled due to the COVID-19 pandemic in Scotland		
