= Community School of Auchterarder =

School in Auchterarder, Perth and Kinross, Scotland

Coordinates: 56.2983°N 3.7058°W

The Community School of Auchterarder (TCSoA) (formerly Auchterarder High School) is a small to medium-sized school with a nursery, primary and secondary department located in Auchterarder, Perth and Kinross, Scotland. The school also contains a modern leisure complex consisting of a large indoor hall and outside all-weather courts, which is also home to Auchterarder Gymnastics Club.

The school continues to grow with more than 500 pupils in both Primary and Secondary. The building of various housing developments in the local area have contributed to the increasing roll. In addition to the Primary pupils within the Community School of Auchterarder, the feeder schools for the Secondary are Dunning Primary, Aberuthven Primary and Blackford Primary.

The Community School Auchterarder was led by Head Teacher Kathryn Dalrymple in 2022.

== Partnership ==
The school partners with a school in Malawi. Linthipe's Secondary School is in Malawi's Dedza region. Linthipe's Secondary School is called Dzenza CDSS and it had 230 pupils in 2024. The Malawi school is powered by a 9kW solar power facility.
