= Lisa Davie =

Scottish curler (born 2000)

- Curler
- Born: July 25, 2000 (age 26); Stirling, Scotland

Team
- Curling club: Dumfries Ice Bowl, Dumfries, SCO
- Skip: Fay Henderson
- Third: Lisa Davie
- Second: Laura Watt
- Lead: Katie McMillan
- Alternate: Sophie Sinclair
- Mixed doubles partner: Mark Watt

Curling career
- Member Association: Scotland; Great Britain
- World Championship: 1 (2026)
- World Mixed Championship: 1 (2022)
- European Championship: 1 (2026)
- World Junior Curling Championship: 2 (2019, 2022)
Medal record
Curling
Representing Scotland
World Mixed Curling Championship
Silver medal – second place	2022 Aberdeen
Scottish Women's Championship
Gold medal – first place	2025 Dumfries
Gold medal – first place	2026 Dumfries
Silver medal – second place	2022 Dumfries
Bronze medal – third place	2023 Aberdeen
Bronze medal – third place	2024 Dumfries
Scottish Mixed Doubles Championship
Silver medal – second place	2024 Perth
Silver medal – second place	2026 Aberdeen
Bronze medal – third place	2025 Aberdeen

Lisa Davie (born July 25, 2000 in Stirling) is a Scottish curler from Denny, Falkirk. She currently plays third on Team Fay Henderson.

== Career ==
=== Juniors ===
Davie found success in juniors skipping her team of Kristy Barr, Anna Skuse and Emma Barr for multiple seasons. After earning a bronze medal at the Scottish Junior Curling Championships in 2017, the team won the event in 2019 by defeating Amy Bryce 11–4 in the championship final. Representing Scotland at the 2019 World Junior Curling Championships, she led her team to a 1–8 last place finish, only managing a win over hosts Canada in their opening game. This relegated them to the 2019 World Junior-B Curling Championships the following season where they failed to advance to the A group after a 3–3 round robin finish.

After skipping for the entirety of her career up to that point, Davie moved to second to join Team Fay Henderson for the 2021–22 season. With third Katie McMillan and lead Holly Wilkie-Milne, this team found immediate success, capturing the 2021 national junior title This qualified the team for the 2022 World Junior Curling Championships where they had mixed results, finishing 3–6 and not advancing to the playoff round. Also during the 2021–22 season, Team Henderson had an impressive performance at the 2022 Scottish Women's Curling Championship, qualifying for the playoffs with a 7–2 record and defeating Amy MacDonald to reach the final. There, they were defeated 8–4 by Rebecca Morrison, settling for silver.

In addition to representing Scotland, Davie played for Great Britain twice at the FISU World University Games while attending Edinburgh Napier University and Open University. In 2023, she was the alternate on the British team that finished fourth, losing both the semifinal and bronze medal games to China and the United States respectively. In 2025, she played lead on the Laura Watt rink that finished 4–5 and missed the playoffs.

=== Women's ===
Out of juniors, Davie joined the Lucy Blair rink at alternate on a team that saw limited success. On tour, they only reached the playoffs once, though advanced to the final of the WCT Latvian International Challenger. They also had a solid run at the 2023 Scottish women's championship, losing in the semifinal to claim the bronze medal. The following year, she left Team Blair to join the newly formed Robyn Munro rink with front-enders Holly Wilkie-Milne and Laura Watt. This team saw slightly more success with semifinal appearances at the 2023 Euro Super Series and Danish Open as well as a quarterfinal appearance at the 2024 Mercure Perth Masters. At the Scottish championship, she again lost in the semifinals, this time to Rebecca Morrison.

For the 2024–25 season, Davie rejoined former skip Fay Henderson alongside Robyn Munro, Hailey Duff and Katie McMillan to become a five-player team. On tour, the team had a hot start, defeating Italy's Stefania Constantini in the final of the 2024 Euro Super Series to claim their first tour win. They also reached the semifinal round at the 2024 Women's Masters Basel, Stu Sells 1824 Halifax Classic and the 2025 International Bernese Ladies Cup. With a successful tour season under their belts, Team Henderson capped off the year by winning the Scottish Women's Curling Championship, defeating Team Morrison in the championship game. Despite the win, Team Morrison was chosen to represent the country at the World Curling Championships.

After just one season, Robyn Munro left Team Henderson and the lineup changed again, this time with Davie moving to third while Laura Watt was added at alternate. On tour, the team saw slightly less success from the prior year, finishing runner-up at the WCT Tallinn Ladies Challenger and reaching one additional semifinal at the 2025 Tour Challenge U25 Grand Slam. They also played in the Tier 2 side of the 2025 Masters Grand Slam of Curling, however, finished 0–4. In the new year, the team again turned things around with an undefeated run to again capture the Scottish women's crown. This time, they were chosen to represent Scotland at the 2026 World Women's Curling Championship as Team Morrison was ineligible due to competing at the 2026 Winter Olympics.

=== Mixed doubles ===
Davie first played in the Scottish Mixed Doubles Curling Championship in 2018 with partner James Craik. That year, the pair finished 2–3 and failed to advance to the playoffs. After failing to qualify again in 2019, she played with Duncan Menzies in the 2022 championship, however, was again unsuccessful in reaching the playoff round.

In 2024, Davie teamed up with Mark Watt and qualified for the first time with a 5–1 record. In the quarterfinals, Davie and Watt beat Fay Henderson and Euan Kyle 7–5 before going on to defeat Rebecca Morrison and Kyle Waddell 8–3 in the semifinals. This advanced them to the final where they lost 9–3 to Sophie Jackson and Duncan McFadzean, earning the silver medal from the championship. The next season, Davie and Watt went 3–1 through the qualifying round, earning a direct bye to the semifinals. They were then eliminated by Sophie Sinclair and Robin Brydone in an 8–7 game, finishing third. In 2026, the pair again had a strong run at the championship, finishing undefeated through the round robin and winning the semifinal to qualify for another final. There, they lost to each of their respective teammates Katie McMillan and Angus Bryce 9–6, settling for silver.

=== Mixed ===
Davie represented Scotland at the 2022 World Mixed Curling Championship, playing third on the team skipped by Cameron Bryce. With second Scott Hyslop and lead Robyn Munro, the team finished 7–1 through the round robin to earn a spot in the playoffs. There, they beat Hungary, Germany and Sweden to reach the final where they were defeated by Canada 7–4, settling for silver.

== Personal life ==
Davie is employed as a veterinary nurse. She previously attended Edinburgh Napier University and Open University.

== Teams ==
Season	Skip	Third	Second	Lead	Alternate
2015–16	Lisa Davie	Kirsty Barr	Anna Skuse	Emma Barr	
2016–17	Lisa Davie	Kirsty Barr	Anna Skuse	Emma Barr	
2017–18	Lisa Davie	Kirsty Barr	Anna Skuse	Emma Barr	
2018–19	Lisa Davie	Kirsty Barr	Anna Skuse	Emma Barr	
2019–20	Lisa Davie	Kirsty Barr	Anna Skuse	Emma Barr	
2020–21	Lisa Davie	Robyn Munro	Robyn Mitchell	Laura Watt	
2021–22	Fay Henderson	Katie McMillan	Lisa Davie	Holly Wilkie-Milne	
2022–23	Lucy Blair	Alexandra MacKintosh	Holly Hamilton	Susie Smith	Lisa Davie
2023–24	Robyn Munro	Lisa Davie	Holly Wilkie-Milne	Laura Watt	
2024–25	Fay Henderson	Robyn Munro	Hailey Duff	Katie McMillan	Lisa Davie
2025–26	Fay Henderson	Lisa Davie	Hailey Duff	Katie McMillan	Laura Watt
2026–27	Fay Henderson	Lisa Davie	Laura Watt	Katie McMillan	Sophie Sinclair
