= Fay Henderson =

Scottish curler (born 2001)

- Curler
- Born: 28 December 2001 (age 24); Dumfries, Scotland

Team
- Curling club: Dumfries CC (Dumfries)
- Skip: Fay Henderson
- Third: Lisa Davie
- Second: Laura Watt
- Lead: Katie McMillan
- Alternate: Sophie Sinclair

Curling career
- Member Association: Scotland; Great Britain
- World Championship: 3 (2022, 2025, 2026)
- European Championship: 3 (2024, 2025, 2026)
- Olympic: 1 (2026)
- Other appearances: World Junior Curling Championships: 2 (2022, 2023), Winter Universiade: 1 (2023)
Medal record
Women's curling
Representing Scotland
European Curling Championships
Silver medal – second place	2025 Lohja
Bronze medal – third place	2024 Lohja
Scottish Women's Championship
Gold medal – first place	2024 Dumfries
Gold medal – first place	2025 Dumfries
Gold medal – first place	2026 Aberdeen
Silver medal – second place	2022 Dumfries
World Junior Curling Championships
Gold medal – first place	2023 Füssen

Fay Henderson (born 28 December 2001) is a Scottish curler from Stirling.

At the international level, she is a 2023 World junior champion curler. She skipped the Great Britain women's team at the 2023 Winter World University Games, finishing 4th.

At the national level, she is a double Scottish women's champion (2024, 2025) and silver medallist (2022), Scottish mixed championship silver medallist (2022), and a Scottish junior champion curler (2021, 2022).

== Teams ==
=== Women's ===
Season	Skip	Third	Second	Lead	Alternate	Coach	Events
2016–17	Fay Henderson	Katie Jackson	Holly Davis	Beth Rowley			
2017–18	Fay Henderson	Katie Jackson	Holly Davis	Beth Rowley			
2018–19	Fay Henderson	Katie Jackson	Holly Davis	Beth Rowley			
2018–19	Fay Henderson	Alex MacKintosh	Holly Davis	Beth Rowley			SJCC 2019 (4th)
2019–20	Fay Henderson	Alex MacKintosh	Holly Davis	Beth Rowley			SJCC 2020 (5th)
2020–21	Fay Henderson	Holly Wilkie-Milne	Holly Davis	Emma Barr			
2021–22	Fay Henderson	Katie McMillan	Lisa Davie	Holly Wilkie-Milne	Robyn Mitchell (WJCC)	Colin Morrison	SJCC 2021 (gold); WJCC 2022 (7th); SWCC 2022 (silver)
2021–22	Rebecca Morrison	Gina Aitken	Sophie Sinclair	Sophie Jackson	Fay Henderson	Nancy Smith	WWCC 2022 (DNF)
2022–23	Fay Henderson	Robyn Munro	Holly Wilkie-Milne	Laura Watt	Lisa Davie (WUG), Amy Mitchell (WJCC)	Colin Morrison	SJCC 2022 (gold) (United Kingdom) WUG 2023 (4th); WJCC 2023 (gold); SWCC 2023 (5th)
2023–24	Fay Henderson	Hailey Duff	Katie McMillan	Amy MacDonald		David Murdoch	
2023–24	Fay Henderson	Hailey Duff	Amy MacDonald	Katie McMillan		Eve Muirhead	SWCC 2024 (gold)
2024–25	Fay Henderson	Robyn Munro	Hailey Duff	Katie McMillan	Lisa Davie	Clancy Grandy	SWCC 2025 (gold)
2024–25	Rebecca Morrison (Fourth)	Jennifer Dodds	Sophie Sinclair	Sophie Jackson (Skip)	Fay Henderson	Ross Paterson	ECC 2024 (bronze); WWCC 2025 (6th)
2025–26	Fay Henderson	Lisa Davie	Hailey Duff	Katie McMillan	Laura Watt	Clancy Grandy	SWCC 2026 (gold); WWCC 2026 (10th)
2025–26	Rebecca Morrison (Fourth)	Jennifer Dodds	Sophie Sinclair	Sophie Jackson (Skip)	Fay Henderson	Ross Paterson	(United Kingdom) WOG 2026 (6th)
2026–27	Fay Henderson	Lisa Davie	Laura Watt	Katie McMillan	Sophie Sinclair	Clancy Grandy	

=== Mixed ===
Season	Skip	Third	Second	Lead	Alternate	Events
2021–22	James Craik	Fay Henderson	Angus Bryce	Laura Watt	Emma Barr	SMxCC 2022 (silver)

=== Mixed doubles ===
Season	Female	Male	Events
2016–17	Fay Henderson	Andrew Roboson	
2017–18	Fay Henderson	Andrew Roboson	
2018–19	Fay Henderson	James Craik	
2021–22	Fay Henderson	James Craik	SMDCC 2022 (13th)
2023–24	Fay Henderson	Euan Kyle	SMDCC 2024 (5th)
2024–25	Fay Henderson	Grant Hardie	SMDCC 2025 (5th)

== Personal life ==
As of 2023, Fay Henderson is a student at the University of Glasgow.

She began curling in 2011, at the age of 10.
