= Mili Smith =

Scottish curler

Mili Smith MBE
- Curler
- Born: 1 March 1998 (age 28); Perth, Scotland

Team
- Curling club: St Martins CC, Perth, SCO
- Skip: Maia Ramsfjell
- Third: Mili Smith
- Second: Pia Trulsen
- Lead: Leanne McKenzie
- Mixed doubles partner: Duncan McFadzean

Curling career
- Member Association: Scotland; Great Britain
- World Championship: 1 (2019)
- European Championship: 1 (2021)
- Olympic: 1 (2022)
Medal record
Women's curling
Representing Great Britain
Olympic Games
Gold medal – first place	2022 Beijing
Representing Scotland
European Curling Championships
Gold medal – first place	2021 Lillehammer
Scottish Women's Curling Championship
Gold medal – first place	2019 Perth
Silver medal – second place	2018 Perth
World Junior Curling Championships
Silver medal – second place	2017 Pyeongchang

Mili Smith (born 1 March 1998) is a Scottish former curler from Perth. She was the alternate on the British team that won the gold medal at the 2022 Winter Olympics in Beijing.

== Career ==
=== Juniors ===
Smith was a member of Team GB at the 2016 Winter Youth Olympics, playing lead on a team skipped by Ross Whyte. The team finished 5th overall. In the mixed doubles event, Smith was paired with South Korea's Hong Yun-jeong. They lost their lone match and were eliminated.

Smith joined the Sophie Jackson junior rink in 2016. In 2017, the Jackson team won the World Junior B championships, earning the right to represent Scotland at the 2017 World Junior Curling Championships. At the World Juniors, the team won the silver medal.

=== Women's ===
The Jackson junior team continued to play together following their junior career. In 2019, the team was invited to play in the third leg of the 2018–19 Curling World Cup, where they finished with a 2–4 record. Two weeks later, the team won the 2019 Scottish championship, defeating perennial winners Eve Muirhead in the final. Team Jackson had committed to play in the 2019 Winter Universiade (which ended just before the World Championships), so Scottish Curling initially wanted to send Muirhead to the 2019 World Women's Curling Championship as Scotland's representative. However, Team Jackson asked for a review of the rules, which stated the winner of the Scottish championship gets to represent the country at the World Championships. The review was successful, and Team Jackson went on to represent Scotland at the 2019 Worlds. They also played in the Universiade, where they finished fourth.

At the 2019 World Women's Curling Championship, Team Jackson finished in 10th place with a 4–8 record.

She won a gold medal at the 2022 Winter Olympics in Beijing as part of Team GB.

On 21 June 2022, Smith announced that she would be stepping away from elite level curling.

Smith was appointed Member of the Order of the British Empire (MBE) in the 2022 Birthday Honours for services to curling.

== Personal life ==
Smith's brother is Kyle Smith who was the skip of the British team at the 2018 Winter Olympics. She attended the University of Stirling and Perth Academy, with whom she won the Scottish Schools' Curling Championship in 2016. In 2021, she graduated from the University of Stirling with a bachelor's degree in psychology. She lives in Stirling.
