= Sophie Sinclair =

Scottish curler (born 1997)

- Curler
- Born: 5 April 1997 (age 29); Edinburgh, Scotland

Team
- Skip: Fay Henderson
- Third: Lisa Davie
- Second: Laura Watt
- Lead: Katie McMillan
- Alternate: Sophie Sinclair
- Mixed doubles partner: Robin Brydone

Curling career
- Member Association: Scotland
- World Championship: 6 (2019, 2021, 2022, 2023, 2024, 2025)
- European Championship: 6 (2019, 2022, 2023, 2024, 2025, 2026)
- Olympic: 1 (2026)
Medal record
Women's curling
Representing Scotland
European Curling Championships
Silver medal – second place	2019 Helsingborg
Silver medal – second place	2025 Lohja
Bronze medal – third place	2022 Östersund
Bronze medal – third place	2024 Lohja
World Junior Curling Championships
Silver medal – second place	2017 Pyeongchang
Scottish Women's Championship
Gold medal – first place	2019 Perth
Gold medal – first place	2022 Dumfries
Gold medal – first place	2023 Dumfries
Silver medal – second place	2018 Perth
Silver medal – second place	2024 Dumfries
Silver medal – second place	2025 Dumfries
Scottish Mixed Doubles Championship
Gold medal – first place	2025 Aberdeen

Sophie Sinclair (born 5 April 1997) is a Scottish curler. She is currently the alternate on Team Fay Henderson.

== Career ==
=== Juniors ===
Sinclair won the Scottish Under-17 curling championship in 2013. She joined the Sophie Jackson junior rink in 2016. In 2017, the Jackson team won the World Junior B championships, earning the right to represent Scotland at the 2017 World Junior Curling Championships. At the World Juniors, the team won the silver medal.

=== Women's ===
The Jackson junior team continued to play together following their junior career. In 2019, the team was invited to play in the third leg of the 2018–19 Curling World Cup, where they finished with a 2–4 record. Two weeks later, the team won the 2019 Scottish championship, defeating perennial winners Eve Muirhead in the final. Team Jackson had committed to play in the 2019 Winter Universiade (which ended just before the World Championships), so Scottish Curling initially wanted to send Muirhead to the 2019 World Women's Curling Championship as Scotland's representative. However, Team Jackson asked for a review of the rules, which stated the winner of the Scottish championship gets to represent the country at the World Championships. The review was successful, and Team Jackson went on to represent Scotland at the 2019 Worlds. They also played in the Universiade, where they finished fourth.

At the 2019 World Women's Curling Championship, Team Jackson finished in 10th place with a 4–8 record.

== Personal life ==
She attended Edinburgh Napier University where she studied Business and Enterprise in Sport.
