= Rebecca Morrison =

Scottish curler (born 1996)

- Curler
- Born: 22 August 1996 (age 30); Bristol, England

Team
- Curling club: Meldrum & Daviot CC, Aberdeen, SCO

Curling career
- Member Association: Scotland
- World Championship: 4 (2022, 2023, 2024, 2025)
- European Championship: 4 (2022, 2023, 2024, 2025)
- Olympic: 1 (2026)
Medal record
Women's curling
Representing Scotland
European Curling Championships
Silver medal – second place	2025 Lohja
Bronze medal – third place	2022 Östersund
Bronze medal – third place	2024 Lohja
Scottish Women's Championship
Gold medal – first place	2022 Dumfries
Gold medal – first place	2023 Dumfries
Silver medal – second place	2020 Perth
Silver medal – second place	2024 Dumfries
Silver medal – second place	2025 Dumfries
Scottish Mixed Doubles Championship
Bronze medal – third place	2024 Perth

Rebecca Morrison (born 22 August 1996) is a retired Scottish curler residing in Glasgow. Morrison was the fourth of team Great Britain at the 2026 Winter Olympic Games, and won a silver (2025) and two bronze medals (2022, 2024) representing Scotland at the European Curling Championships. Morrison also won 2 Scottish national women's titles in 2022 and 2023.

== Career ==
Rebecca Morrison's national curling career has been closely intertwined with that of the Team GB nine-player squad. In being part of this squad, she skipped Team GB to the Euro Super Series championship in 2019. She later formed her current squad, with two of the other three members previous being on the team (the only person not is lead Sophie Jackson). Team Morrison, competing with third/vice-skip Gina Aitken, second Sophie Sinclair, and lead Sophie Jackson, won the 2022 Scottish Curling Championships which qualified them for the 2022 World Women's Curling Championship in Prince George. They were selected over Team Muirhead who did not compete at the 2022 Scottish Championships because of the proximity in time to the 2022 Olympic Winter Games. Unfortunately, Team Morrison was forced to withdraw from the 2022 World Championship after four of the five players on the team tested positive for COVID-19 leaving only one curler eligible to curl with Morrison and Fay Henderson testing positive before the start of the tournament, dropping team Morrison down to three players including the alternate and leaving them without their skip. On 20 March 2022, two more members of the team tested positive forcing Team Morrison to withdraw.

The following season, Team Morrison would continue to show success, winning bronze at the 2022 European Curling Championships, beating Italy's Stefania Constantini 9–5 in the bronze medal game. They would also defend their Scottish championship, qualifying to represent Scotland at the 2023 World Women's Curling Championship. There, they would finish with a 3–9 record. Team Morrison would also compete in their first Grand Slam of Curling events that season; missing the playoffs with a 1–3 record at the 2023 Masters, but would qualify for the playoffs at the 2023 Tour Challenge before losing to Sweden's Anna Hasselborg 8–5 in the quarterfinals. At the end of the season, the team decided for Sophie Jackson to still throw lead stones, but begin calling the game, with Morrison continuing to throw the fourth stones.

As the new Team Jackson, though they would lose in the final in the 2024 Scottish Championships, they would continue to be selected to represent Scotland at international events in the 2024–25 curling season, and would win their second European bronze medal at the 2024 European Curling Championships, beating Italy's Constantini again 6–4 in the bronze medal game, and compete at the 2025 World Women's Curling Championship. At the 2025 World's, Team Jackson would qualify for the playoffs after finishing the round robin with a 7–5 record, before losing to Canada's Rachel Homan 10–4, finishing 6th. This result however, was enough to qualify Great Britain for the 2026 Winter Olympics, as well as Team Jackson's spot as team GB for the Olympic games. Team Morrison would start the 2025–26 curling season with their best performance to date at the 2025 European Curling Championships, finishing with a silver medal after losing to Sweden's Hasselborg 7–5 in the final. At the Olympics, Team Jackson would just miss the playoffs, finishing the round robin with a strong 5–4 record. Morrison was also ranked first among curlers at the fourth position with an 81.6 shooting percentage. At the end of the season, Morrison decided to retire from international curling.

== Grand Slam record ==
Key
C	Champion
F	Lost in Final
SF	Lost in Semifinal
QF	Lost in Quarterfinals
R16	Lost in the round of 16
Q	Did not advance to playoffs
T2	Played in Tier 2 event
DNP	Did not participate in event
N/A	Not a Grand Slam event that season

Event	2023–24	2024–25	2025–26
Masters	Q	DNP	T2
Tour Challenge	QF	Q	DNP
The National	DNP	DNP	Q
Canadian Open	Q	DNP	Q
