= Sophie Jackson =

Scottish curler (born 1996)

- Curler
- Born: 22 July 1996 (age 30); Dumfries, Scotland

Team
- Curling club: Curl Aberdeen, Aberdeen
- Mixed doubles partner: Duncan McFadzean

Curling career
- Member Association: Scotland
- World Championship: 6 (2018, 2019, 2022, 2023, 2024, 2025)
- World Mixed Doubles Championship: 1 (2024)
- European Championship: 4 (2022, 2023, 2024, 2025)
- Olympic: 1 (2026)
Medal record
Women's curling
Representing Scotland
European Curling Championships
Silver medal – second place	2025 Lohja
Bronze medal – third place	2022 Östersund
Bronze medal – third place	2024 Lohja
World Junior Curling Championships
Silver medal – second place	2017 Pyeongchang
World Mixed Curling Championship
Bronze medal – third place	2016 Kazan
Scottish Women's Championship
Gold medal – first place	2019 Perth
Gold medal – first place	2022 Dumfries
Gold medal – first place	2023 Dumfries
Silver medal – second place	2018 Perth
Silver medal – second place	2025 Dumfries
Scottish Mixed Doubles Championship
Gold medal – first place	2024 Perth
Silver medal – second place	2023 Perth
Silver medal – second place	2025 Aberdeen
Bronze medal – third place	2016 Glasgow
Bronze medal – third place	2026 Aberdeen

Sophie Jackson (born 22 July 1996, in Dumfries) is a Scottish curler.

== Career ==
=== Juniors ===
Jackson twice skipped Team Scotland at the World Junior Curling Championships. Her first was in 2016, when she led her team of Naomi Brown, Rachael Halliday and Rachel Hannen to a 2-7 record. This relegated Scotland to the World Junior-B Curling Championships for the following season. In 2017, she once again skipped the Scottish junior team. She and teammates of Brown, Mili Smith and Sophie Sinclair won the Junior B championships, earning the right to represent Scotland at the 2017 World Junior Curling Championships. At the World Juniors, her team continued her winning ways, finishing the round robin tied with Sweden's Isabella Wranå rink for first with a 7-2 record. In the playoffs, she lost to Sweden in the 1 vs. 2 game, beat Canada in the semifinal, but lost again to Sweden in the final to claim the silver medal. Jackson was invited to be Scotland's alternate at the 2018 World Junior Curling Championships on a team skipped by Rebecca Morrison. The team finished with a 3-6 record, and Jackson played in two games.

=== Women's ===
Jackson, Brown, Smith and Sinclair were runners-up at the 2018 Scottish Women's Curling Championship, losing to Team Hannah Flemming in the final. Flemming went on to represent Scotland at the 2018 World Women's Curling Championship, and that team invited Jackson to be the team's alternate. There, the team finished with a 5-7 record, and Jackson did not play in any matches.

The following season, Team Jackson was invited to play in the third leg of the 2018–19 Curling World Cup, finishing with a 2-4 record. Two weeks later, the team won the 2019 Scottish championship, defeating perennial winners Eve Muirhead in the final. Team Jackson had committed to play in the 2019 Winter Universiade (which ended just before the World Championships), so Scottish Curling initially wanted to send Muirhead to the 2019 World Women's Curling Championship as Scotland's representative. However, Team Jackson asked for a review of the rules, which stated the winner of the Scottish championship gets to represent the country at the World Championships. The review was successful, and Team Jackson went on to represent Scotland at the 2019 Worlds. They also played in the Universiade, where they finished fourth.

At the 2019 World Women's Curling Championship, Team Jackson finished in 10th place with a 4-8 record. Jackson missed three games at the event due to a back injury, and was replaced by alternate Lauren Gray for those games.

=== Mixed ===
Jackson has twice represented Scotland at the World Mixed Curling Championship, playing lead on teams skipped by Cameron Bryce on both occasions. At the 2015 World Mixed Curling Championship the team lost in the round of 12, and at the 2016 World Mixed Curling Championship, they won the bronze medal.

== Personal life ==
Jackson used to work as a manager at the Scottish Curling Academy.
