= 2023 Champions Cup (curling) =

Grand Slam of Curling event

2023 KIOTI Tractor Champions Cup
- Host city: Regina, Saskatchewan
- Arena: The Co-operators Centre
- Dates: May 2–7
- Men's winner: (Alberta) Team Bottcher
- Curling club: Calgary CC, Calgary
- Skip: Brendan Bottcher
- Third: Marc Kennedy
- Second: Brett Gallant
- Lead: Ben Hebert
- Coach: Paul Webster
- Finalist: (Newfoundland and Labrador) Brad Gushue
- Women's winner: (Ontario) Team Homan
- Curling club: Ottawa CC, Ottawa
- Skip: Rachel Homan
- Third: Tracy Fleury
- Second: Emma Miskew
- Lead: Rachelle Brown
- Coach: Ryan Fry
- Finalist: (Manitoba) Kerri Einarson

The 2023 KIOTI Tractor Champions Cup was held from May 2 to 7 at The Co-operators Centre in Regina, Saskatchewan. It was the sixth and final Grand Slam event of the 2022–23 curling season. This was the last edition of the Champions Cup before the event was put on hiatus for the 2023–24 season. The total combined purse of the event was $210,000.

Both the men's and women's events featured an all-Canadian final, the first time this has happened since the 2018 Tour Challenge. The men's final featured Team Brad Gushue from Newfoundland and Labrador against Team Brendan Bottcher from Alberta, while the women's final pitted Team Kerri Einarson from Manitoba against Ontario's Rachel Homan.

In the men's final, Team Bottcher defeated Team Gushue 5–3, giving Bottcher his fifth career Slam title. The game started off with a miss by Bottcher though, as he hit-and-stuck on a blank attempt, taking a 1–0 lead after the first. Down 2–1 after four, Gushue got the game's first deuce in the fifth following a successful draw attempt. Bottcher scored two right back in the sixth with an open hit. Gushue blanked the seventh to keep hammer in the last end. On his last shot, he opted for a difficult "around the horn" takeout to score two for the win, but he couldn't quite make it, giving Bottcher a steal of one and losing the game.

In the women's final, Team Homan downed Team Einarson 6–5 in an extra end, giving Homan her 13th Slam title. Einarson started off with a steal of one in the first thanks to a successful angle raise take out, followed by a missed double takeout attempt by Homan. Homan missed a double takeout on her last shot again in the second, giving up another steal of one. Homan came up short on a draw attempt in the third to go down 4–0 after three. Homan finally got on the board in the fourth with a draw to the button against five or six Einarson counters. Homan continued to claw back with steals in the next two ends when Einarson came up light in the fifth and jammed a double takeout attempt in the sixth. Einarson finally scored with the hammer in the seventh when she missed a blank attempt, with her shooter rock not able to roll out of the rings. Homan was able to score two in the eighth to tie the game, forcing an extra end. In the extra, Einarson attempted to bump her own rock onto the button on her last, but wasn't able to beat out a Homan counter that was covering the pin, giving the win to Homan.

== Qualification ==
Twelve teams qualified for the Champions Cup through winning different events over the course of the 2022–23 season.

=== Men ===
Qualifying Event	Team
2022 Princess Auto Players' Championship	(Scotland) Bruce Mouat
2022 KIOTI Tractor Champions Cup	(Newfoundland and Labrador) Brad Gushue
2022 World Men's Curling Championship	(Sweden) Niklas Edin
2022 European Curling Championships	~~(Scotland) Bruce Mouat~~
2022 BOOST National	~~(Newfoundland and Labrador) Brad Gushue~~
2022 HearingLife Tour Challenge	~~(Sweden) Niklas Edin~~
2022 HearingLife Tour Challenge Tier 2	(United States) Korey Dropkin
2022 WFG Masters	(Italy) Joël Retornaz
2023 Co-op Canadian Open	(Alberta) Brendan Bottcher
2023 Tim Hortons Brier	~~(Newfoundland and Labrador) Brad Gushue~~
2023 United States Men's Curling Championship	(United States) John Shuster
2022 PointsBet Invitational	(Manitoba) Reid Carruthers
2023 SCT Players Championship	(Saskatchewan) Kelly Knapp
2022 ATB Okotoks Classic	~~(Alberta) Brendan Bottcher~~
2022 Nufloors Penticton Curling Classic	~~(United States) John Shuster~~
2022 Red Deer Curling Classic	(Manitoba) Matt Dunstone
2022 Curling Stadium Alberta Curling Series: Major	~~(Switzerland) Yannick Schwaller~~
2022 Swiss Cup Basel	(Scotland) Ross Whyte
2023 Mercure Perth Masters	~~(Scotland) Bruce Mouat~~
2022 Euro Super Series	~~(Italy) Joël Retornaz~~
2022 Stu Sells Toronto Tankard	~~(Sweden) Niklas Edin~~
2022 Oslo Cup	~~(Sweden) Niklas Edin~~
2022 IG Wealth Management Western Showdown	~~(Sweden) Niklas Edin~~
2022 Aberdeen International Curling Championship	~~(Scotland) Ross Whyte~~
2022 Curling Stadium Martensville International	~~(Switzerland) Yannick Schwaller~~
2022 DEKALB Superspiel	~~(Manitoba) Matt Dunstone~~
2022 Stu Sells Brantford NISSAN Classic	(Ontario) Pat Ferris

=== Women ===
Qualifying Event	Team
2022 Princess Auto Players' Championship	(Sweden) Anna Hasselborg
2022 KIOTI Tractor Champions Cup	(Manitoba) Kerri Einarson
2022 World Women's Curling Championship	(Switzerland) Silvana Tirinzoni
2022 European Curling Championships	~~(Denmark) Madeleine Dupont~~
2022 BOOST National	~~(Switzerland) Silvana Tirinzoni~~
2022 HearingLife Tour Challenge	(Ontario) Tracy Fleury
2022 HearingLife Tour Challenge Tier 2	(British Columbia) Clancy Grandy
2022 WFG Masters	~~(Manitoba) Kerri Einarson~~
2023 Co-op Canadian Open	(Japan) Satsuki Fujisawa
2023 Scotties Tournament of Hearts	~~(Manitoba) Kerri Einarson~~
2023 United States Women's Curling Championship	(United States) Tabitha Peterson
2022 PointsBet Invitational	(Manitoba) Jennifer Jones
2022 RBC Dominion Securities Western Showdown	~~(Switzerland) Silvana Tirinzoni~~
2022 Curlers Corner Autumn Gold Curling Classic	(South Korea) Gim Eun-ji
2022 Prism Flow Red Deer Curling Classic	~~(Ontario) Tracy Fleury~~
2022 Saville Shoot-Out	~~(Manitoba) Jennifer Jones~~
2022 Curling Stadium Martensville International	~~(British Columbia) Clancy Grandy~~
2022 DEKALB Superspiel	~~(Manitoba) Meghan Walter~~
2022 Oslo Cup	~~(Sweden) Anna Hasselborg~~
2022 Stu Sells Toronto Tankard	~~(Switzerland) Silvana Tirinzoni~~
2022 Summer Series	~~(Switzerland) Silvana Tirinzoni~~
2022 Curling Stadium Alberta Curling Series: Major	~~(Japan) Ikue Kitazawa~~
2022 Stu Sells Brantford NISSAN Classic	~~(South Korea) Gim Eun-ji~~
2022 Karuizawa International	~~(South Korea) Kim Eun-jung~~
2022 Stu Sells 1824 Halifax Classic	(Manitoba) Kaitlyn Lawes
2022 North Grenville Fall Classic	(Ontario) Isabelle Ladouceur
2023 Sun City Cup	(Norway) Marianne Rørvik

== Men ==
=== Teams ===
The teams are listed as follows:

Skip	Third	Second	Lead	Alternate	Locale
Brendan Bottcher	Marc Kennedy	Brett Gallant	Ben Hebert		Calgary, Alberta
Reid Carruthers	Brad Jacobs (Note: Brad Jacobs replaced Jason Gunnlaugson, who parted ways with Team Carruthers following the 2022 Masters.)	Derek Samagalski	Connor Njegovan		Winnipeg, Manitoba
Andrew Stopera	Thomas Howell	Mark Fenner	Ben Richardson (Note: Ben Richardson replaced Korey Dropkin, with the remainder of the team shifting positions.)		(United States) Duluth, Minnesota
Matt Dunstone	B. J. Neufeld	Colton Lott	Ryan Harnden		Winnipeg, Manitoba
Niklas Edin	Oskar Eriksson	Rasmus Wranå	Christoffer Sundgren		Karlstad, Sweden
Pat Ferris	Connor Lawes	Connor Duhaime	Robert Currie	Evan Lilly	Grimsby, Ontario
Brad Gushue	Mark Nichols	E. J. Harnden	Geoff Walker		St. John's, Newfoundland and Labrador
Kelly Knapp	Brennen Jones	Mike Armstrong	Trent Knapp	Dustin Kidby	Regina, Saskatchewan
Bruce Mouat	Grant Hardie	– (Note: Team Mouat played with three players.)	Hammy McMillan Jr.		Stirling, Scotland
Joël Retornaz	Amos Mosaner	– (Note: Team Retornaz played with three players.)	Sebastiano Arman		Trentino, Italy
John Shuster	Jason Smith (Note: Jason Smith spared for Chris Plys.)	Matt Hamilton	John Landsteiner		(United States) Duluth, Minnesota
Ross Whyte (Fourth)	Robin Brydone (Skip)	Duncan McFadzean	Euan Kyle		Stirling, Scotland

=== Round robin standings ===
Final Round Robin Standings

Key
Teams to Playoffs
Teams to Tiebreakers

Pool A	W	L	PF	PA
(Manitoba) Matt Dunstone	5	0	36	19
(Newfoundland and Labrador) Brad Gushue	4	1	33	16
(Manitoba) Reid Carruthers	2	3	20	22
(Scotland) Team Whyte	2	3	20	28
(Italy) Joël Retornaz	2	3	26	25
(Ontario) Pat Ferris	0	5	10	35

Pool B	W	L	PF	PA
(Alberta) Brendan Bottcher	5	0	32	18
(Sweden) Niklas Edin	4	1	35	21
(United States) John Shuster	2	3	25	22
(United States) Team Dropkin	2	3	25	36
(Scotland) Bruce Mouat	2	3	29	24
(Saskatchewan) Kelly Knapp	0	5	8	33

=== Round robin results ===
All draw times are listed in Central Standard Time (UTC−06:00).

==== Draw 1 ====
Tuesday, May 2, 11:30 am

Sheet A	1	2	3	4	5	6	7	8	Final
(Italy) Joël Retornaz	0	1	0	1	0	0	2	0	4
(Scotland) Team Whyte 🔨	1	0	1	0	0	2	0	1	5

Sheet C	1	2	3	4	5	6	7	8	Final
(Alberta) Brendan Bottcher 🔨	1	0	0	3	0	0	3	X	7
(Saskatchewan) Kelly Knapp	0	1	0	0	1	0	0	X	2

==== Draw 2 ====
Tuesday, May 2, 3:00 pm

Sheet A	1	2	3	4	5	6	7	8	Final
(Manitoba) Matt Dunstone	0	0	0	2	1	0	1	2	6
(Manitoba) Reid Carruthers 🔨	0	2	1	0	0	0	0	0	3

Sheet C	1	2	3	4	5	6	7	8	Final
(Sweden) Niklas Edin	3	1	0	3	0	0	3	X	10
(United States) Team Dropkin 🔨	0	0	2	0	2	1	0	X	5

==== Draw 3 ====
Tuesday, May 2, 6:30 pm

Sheet A	1	2	3	4	5	6	7	8	Final
(Newfoundland and Labrador) Brad Gushue 🔨	0	4	0	1	0	3	X	X	8
(Ontario) Pat Ferris	0	0	1	0	1	0	X	X	2

Sheet C	1	2	3	4	5	6	7	8	Final
(Scotland) Bruce Mouat	0	0	2	1	1	2	0	X	6
(United States) John Shuster 🔨	1	1	0	0	0	0	1	X	3

==== Draw 4 ====
Wednesday, May 3, 8:30 am

Sheet B	1	2	3	4	5	6	7	8	Final
(Manitoba) Reid Carruthers	0	0	2	0	0	0	2	1	5
(Scotland) Team Whyte 🔨	1	0	0	2	0	0	0	0	3

Sheet D	1	2	3	4	5	6	7	8	Final
(Alberta) Brendan Bottcher 🔨	0	2	0	1	0	1	0	4	8
(United States) Team Dropkin	1	0	1	0	1	0	1	0	4

==== Draw 5 ====
Wednesday, May 3, 12:00 pm

Sheet A	1	2	3	4	5	6	7	8	Final
(Scotland) Bruce Mouat 🔨	3	0	2	0	3	X	X	X	8
(Saskatchewan) Kelly Knapp	0	1	0	1	0	X	X	X	2

Sheet C	1	2	3	4	5	6	7	8	Final
(Newfoundland and Labrador) Brad Gushue 🔨	1	0	2	1	0	0	3	X	7
(Italy) Joël Retornaz	0	1	0	0	1	0	0	X	2

==== Draw 6 ====
Wednesday, May 3, 4:00 pm

Sheet A	1	2	3	4	5	6	7	8	Final
(United States) Team Dropkin	0	2	1	0	0	1	0	X	4
(United States) John Shuster 🔨	4	0	0	2	0	0	5	X	11

Sheet C	1	2	3	4	5	6	7	8	Final
(Ontario) Pat Ferris	0	0	1	0	0	1	X	X	2
(Manitoba) Reid Carruthers 🔨	0	2	0	3	1	0	X	X	6

==== Draw 7 ====
Wednesday, May 3, 8:00 pm

Sheet B	1	2	3	4	5	6	7	8	Final
(Newfoundland and Labrador) Brad Gushue	0	1	0	2	0	1	0	X	4
(Manitoba) Matt Dunstone 🔨	1	0	2	0	3	0	2	X	8

Sheet D	1	2	3	4	5	6	7	8	9	Final
(Sweden) Niklas Edin 🔨	3	0	1	0	1	0	1	0	1	7
(Scotland) Bruce Mouat	0	2	0	2	0	1	0	1	0	6

==== Draw 8 ====
Thursday, May 4, 8:30 am

Sheet B	1	2	3	4	5	6	7	8	Final
(United States) John Shuster 🔨	1	0	0	0	3	2	X	X	6
(Saskatchewan) Kelly Knapp	0	0	0	0	0	0	X	X	0

Sheet D	1	2	3	4	5	6	7	8	Final
(Italy) Joël Retornaz 🔨	0	2	1	0	2	1	1	X	7
(Ontario) Pat Ferris	0	0	0	2	0	0	0	X	2

==== Draw 9 ====
Thursday, May 4, 12:00 pm

Sheet B	1	2	3	4	5	6	7	8	Final
(Sweden) Niklas Edin 🔨	1	0	2	0	0	1	X	X	4
(Alberta) Brendan Bottcher	0	3	0	2	2	0	X	X	7

Sheet C	1	2	3	4	5	6	7	8	Final
(Manitoba) Matt Dunstone	0	3	0	2	0	1	1	X	7
(Scotland) Team Whyte 🔨	2	0	2	0	0	0	0	X	4

==== Draw 10 ====
Thursday, May 4, 4:00 pm

Sheet B	1	2	3	4	5	6	7	8	Final
(Italy) Joël Retornaz	0	0	2	0	2	1	1	X	6
(Manitoba) Reid Carruthers 🔨	0	2	0	1	0	0	0	X	3

Sheet D	1	2	3	4	5	6	7	8	Final
(United States) Team Dropkin	0	1	1	0	1	0	2	0	5
(Saskatchewan) Kelly Knapp 🔨	0	0	0	1	0	1	0	0	2

==== Draw 11 ====
Thursday, May 4, 8:00 pm

Sheet B	1	2	3	4	5	6	7	8	Final
(Newfoundland and Labrador) Brad Gushue 🔨	2	1	0	2	4	X	X	X	9
(Scotland) Team Whyte	0	0	1	0	0	X	X	X	1

Sheet C	1	2	3	4	5	6	7	8	9	Final
(Scotland) Bruce Mouat	0	1	0	0	0	2	1	0	0	4
(Alberta) Brendan Bottcher 🔨	0	0	1	1	0	0	0	2	1	5

==== Draw 12 ====
Friday, May 5, 8:30 am

Sheet A	1	2	3	4	5	6	7	8	Final
(Sweden) Niklas Edin 🔨	2	0	2	1	2	X	X	X	7
(United States) John Shuster	0	1	0	0	0	X	X	X	1

Sheet B	1	2	3	4	5	6	7	8	Final
(Manitoba) Matt Dunstone	0	2	1	2	1	1	X	X	7
(Ontario) Pat Ferris 🔨	1	0	0	0	0	0	X	X	1

==== Draw 13 ====
Friday, May 5, 12:00 pm

Sheet B	1	2	3	4	5	6	7	8	Final
(Scotland) Bruce Mouat 🔨	0	1	0	1	0	2	1	0	5
(United States) Team Dropkin	1	0	2	0	3	0	0	1	7

Sheet D	1	2	3	4	5	6	7	8	Final
(Newfoundland and Labrador) Brad Gushue 🔨	3	0	0	1	0	1	0	X	5
(Manitoba) Reid Carruthers	0	0	1	0	1	0	1	X	3

==== Draw 14 ====
Friday, May 5, 4:00 pm

Sheet A	1	2	3	4	5	6	7	8	Final
(Manitoba) Matt Dunstone	2	0	1	0	3	0	2	0	8
(Italy) Joël Retornaz 🔨	0	2	0	2	0	2	0	1	7

Sheet C	1	2	3	4	5	6	7	8	Final
(Sweden) Niklas Edin 🔨	1	1	1	0	3	0	1	X	7
(Saskatchewan) Kelly Knapp	0	0	0	1	0	1	0	X	2

Sheet D	1	2	3	4	5	6	7	8	Final
(Alberta) Brendan Bottcher	0	3	0	0	0	1	0	1	5
(United States) John Shuster 🔨	1	0	1	1	0	0	1	0	4

==== Draw 15 ====
Friday, May 5, 8:00 pm

Sheet A	1	2	3	4	5	6	7	8	Final
(Scotland) Team Whyte	0	0	2	1	1	0	3	X	7
(Ontario) Pat Ferris 🔨	1	1	0	0	0	1	0	X	3

=== Tiebreakers ===
Saturday, May 6, 12:00 pm

Sheet A	1	2	3	4	5	6	7	8	Final
(United States) John Shuster 🔨	1	0	0	0	2	0	0	0	3
(United States) Team Dropkin	0	2	1	0	0	2	0	1	6

Player percentages
(United States) Team Shuster		(United States) Team Dropkin	
John Landsteiner	91%	Ben Richardson	88%
Matt Hamilton	80%	Mark Fenner	80%
Jason Smith	78%	Thomas Howell	86%
John Shuster	72%	Andrew Stopera	84%
Total	80%	Total	84%

Sheet B	1	2	3	4	5	6	7	8	Final
(Manitoba) Reid Carruthers 🔨	2	0	1	0	0	1	0	0	4
(Scotland) Team Whyte	0	2	0	0	1	0	0	2	5

Player percentages
(Manitoba) Team Carruthers		(Scotland) Team Whyte	
Connor Njegovan	91%	Euan Kyle	94%
Derek Samagalski	72%	Duncan McFadzean	92%
Brad Jacobs	88%	Robin Brydone	81%
Reid Carruthers	89%	Ross Whyte	89%
Total	85%	Total	89%

=== Playoffs ===
Quarterfinals
4	(Sweden) Niklas Edin	6
5	(United States) Team Dropkin	3
3	(Newfoundland and Labrador) Brad Gushue	7
6	(Scotland) Team Whyte	4

Semifinals
1	(Alberta) Brendan Bottcher	7
4	(Sweden) Niklas Edin	2
2	(Manitoba) Matt Dunstone	3
3	(Newfoundland and Labrador) Brad Gushue	8

Final
1	(Alberta) Brendan Bottcher	5
3	(Newfoundland and Labrador) Brad Gushue	3

==== Quarterfinals ====
Saturday, May 6, 4:00 pm

Sheet C	1	2	3	4	5	6	7	8	Final
(Newfoundland and Labrador) Brad Gushue 🔨	0	2	0	2	0	1	0	2	7
(Scotland) Team Whyte	1	0	1	0	1	0	1	0	4

Player percentages
(Newfoundland and Labrador) Team Gushue		(Scotland) Team Whyte	
Geoff Walker	91%	Euan Kyle	97%
E. J. Harnden	86%	Duncan McFadzean	86%
Mark Nichols	86%	Robin Brydone	89%
Brad Gushue	92%	Ross Whyte	72%
Total	89%	Total	86%

Sheet D	1	2	3	4	5	6	7	8	Final
(Sweden) Niklas Edin 🔨	1	0	2	2	0	1	0	X	6
(United States) Team Dropkin	0	1	0	0	2	0	0	X	3

Player percentages
(Sweden) Team Edin		(United States) Team Dropkin	
Christoffer Sundgren	92%	Ben Richardson	73%
Rasmus Wranå	94%	Mark Fenner	70%
Oskar Eriksson	78%	Thomas Howell	63%
Niklas Edin	77%	Andrew Stopera	65%
Total	85%	Total	68%

==== Semifinals ====
Saturday, May 6, 8:00 pm

Sheet B	1	2	3	4	5	6	7	8	Final
(Manitoba) Matt Dunstone 🔨	1	0	1	0	1	0	0	X	3
(Newfoundland and Labrador) Brad Gushue	0	1	0	2	0	2	3	X	8

Player percentages
(Manitoba) Team Dunstone		(Newfoundland and Labrador) Team Gushue	
Ryan Harnden	84%	Geoff Walker	93%
Colton Lott	89%	E. J. Harnden	63%
B. J. Neufeld	82%	Mark Nichols	64%
Matt Dunstone	71%	Brad Gushue	96%
Total	82%	Total	79%

Sheet C	1	2	3	4	5	6	7	8	Final
(Alberta) Brendan Bottcher 🔨	2	0	1	0	2	2	X	X	7
(Sweden) Niklas Edin	0	0	0	2	0	0	X	X	2

Player percentages
(Alberta) Team Bottcher		(Sweden) Team Edin	
Ben Hebert	98%	Christoffer Sundgren	100%
Brett Gallant	83%	Rasmus Wranå	90%
Marc Kennedy	88%	Oskar Eriksson	83%
Brendan Bottcher	90%	Niklas Edin	71%
Total	90%	Total	86%

==== Final ====
Sunday, May 7, 11:00 am

Sheet B	1	2	3	4	5	6	7	8	Final
(Alberta) Brendan Bottcher 🔨	1	0	0	1	0	2	0	1	5
(Newfoundland and Labrador) Brad Gushue	0	0	1	0	2	0	0	0	3

Player percentages
(Alberta) Team Bottcher		(Newfoundland and Labrador) Team Gushue	
Ben Hebert	100%	Geoff Walker	98%
Brett Gallant	92%	E. J. Harnden	92%
Marc Kennedy	88%	Mark Nichols	89%
Brendan Bottcher	84%	Brad Gushue	92%
Total	91%	Total	93%

=== Player percentages ===
Final Round Robin Percentages

Leads	%
(Sweden) Christoffer Sundgren	95
(Scotland) Euan Kyle	95
(Manitoba) Ryan Harnden	94
(Manitoba) Connor Njegovan	93
(Newfoundland and Labrador) Geoff Walker	92
(United States) Ben Richardson	90
(Saskatchewan) Trent Knapp	89
(Alberta) Ben Hebert	86
(Italy) Sebastiano Arman	86
(Scotland) Hammy McMillan Jr.	86
(United States) John Landsteiner	85
(Ontario) Robert Currie	83

Seconds	%
(Manitoba) Colton Lott	91
(Sweden) Rasmus Wranå	89
(Alberta) Brett Gallant	88
(Scotland) Duncan McFadzean	88
(Manitoba) Derek Samagalski	87
(Newfoundland and Labrador) E. J. Harnden	84
(United States) Mark Fenner	82
(Saskatchewan) Mike Armstrong	79
(United States) Matt Hamilton	77
(Ontario) Connor Duhaime	71

Thirds	%
(Manitoba) B. J. Neufeld	91
(Alberta) Marc Kennedy	90
(Newfoundland and Labrador) Mark Nichols	89
(Scotland) Grant Hardie	86
(Italy) Amos Mosaner	82
(Sweden) Oskar Eriksson	82
(United States) Thomas Howell	82
(Manitoba) Brad Jacobs	79
(Scotland) Robin Brydone (Skip)	77
(United States) Jason Smith	76
(Ontario) Connor Lawes	73
(Saskatchewan) Brennen Jones	72

Skips	%
(Newfoundland and Labrador) Brad Gushue	87
(Manitoba) Matt Dunstone	86
(Scotland) Bruce Mouat	86
(Alberta) Brendan Bottcher	84
(Manitoba) Reid Carruthers	81
(Sweden) Niklas Edin	80
(Italy) Joël Retornaz	80
(Scotland) Ross Whyte (Fourth)	79
(United States) Andrew Stopera	76
(Saskatchewan) Kelly Knapp	73
(United States) John Shuster	72
(Ontario) Pat Ferris	60

== Women ==
=== Teams ===
The teams are listed as follows:

Skip	Third	Second	Lead	Alternate	Locale
Kerri Einarson	Val Sweeting	Shannon Birchard	Dawn McEwen (Note: Dawn McEwen spared for Briane Harris who was on maternity leave.)		Gimli, Manitoba
Satsuki Fujisawa	Chinami Yoshida	Yumi Suzuki	Yurika Yoshida	Kotomi Ishizaki	Kitami, Japan
Gim Eun-ji	Kim Min-ji	Kim Su-ji	Seol Ye-eun	Seol Ye-ji	Uijeongbu, South Korea
Clancy Grandy	Kayla MacMillan	Lindsay Dubue	Sarah Loken		Vancouver, British Columbia
Sara McManus (Fourth)	Agnes Knochenhauer (Skip)	Johanna Heldin (Note: Johanna Heldin spared for Anna Hasselborg who was on maternity leave. She played second, while Knochenhauer moved to skip throwing third rocks and McManus played fourth.)	Sofia Mabergs		Sundbyberg, Sweden
Rachel Homan (Note: Rachel Homan skipped the team for the second half of the week due to muscle issues which was later revealed as pregnancy.)	Tracy Fleury	Emma Miskew	Rachelle Brown (Note: Rachelle Brown spared for Sarah Wilkes who was on maternity leave.)		Ottawa, Ontario
Jennifer Jones	Karlee Burgess	Mackenzie Zacharias	Emily Zacharias	Lauren Lenentine	Winnipeg, Manitoba
Isabelle Ladouceur	Grace Lloyd (Note: Grace Lloyd and Jamie Smith switched positions.)	Jamie Smith	Michaela Robert (Note: Michaela Robert spared for Rachel Steele.)		Waterloo, Ontario
Kaitlyn Lawes	Laura Walker (Note: Laura Walker spared for Selena Njegovan who was on maternity leave.)	Jolene Campbell (Note: Jolene Campbell spared for Jocelyn Peterman who was on maternity leave.)	Kristin MacCuish		Winnipeg, Manitoba
Tabitha Peterson	Becca Hamilton	– (Note: Team Peterson played with three players.)	Tara Peterson		(United States) Chaska, Minnesota
Kristin Skaslien (Fourth)	Marianne Rørvik (Skip)	Mille Haslev Nordbye	Martine Rønning		Lillehammer, Norway
Alina Pätz (Fourth)	Silvana Tirinzoni (Skip)	Carole Howald	Rachel Erickson (Note: Rachel Erickson replaced Briar Schwaller-Hürlimann who parted ways with the team.)		Aarau, Switzerland

=== Round robin standings ===
Final Round Robin Standings

Key
Teams to Playoffs
Teams to Tiebreakers

Pool A	W	L	PF	PA
(Manitoba) Kerri Einarson	3	2	28	24
(Japan) Satsuki Fujisawa	3	2	28	28
(British Columbia) Clancy Grandy	3	2	30	22
(South Korea) Gim Eun-ji	3	2	32	28
(Manitoba) Kaitlyn Lawes	2	3	24	32
(Ontario) Isabelle Ladouceur	1	4	26	34

Pool B	W	L	PF	PA
(United States) Tabitha Peterson	4	1	32	26
(Ontario) Rachel Homan	3	2	28	32
(Sweden) Team Hasselborg	3	2	27	35
(Manitoba) Jennifer Jones	3	2	34	17
(Norway) Marianne Rørvik	1	4	17	30
(Switzerland) Silvana Tirinzoni	1	4	27	25

=== Round robin results ===
All draw times are listed in Central Standard Time (UTC−06:00).

==== Draw 1 ====
Tuesday, May 2, 11:30 am

Sheet B	1	2	3	4	5	6	7	8	Final
(Japan) Satsuki Fujisawa 🔨	0	2	0	4	0	1	0	1	8
(South Korea) Gim Eun-ji	0	0	1	0	4	0	1	0	6

Sheet D	1	2	3	4	5	6	7	8	Final
(Switzerland) Silvana Tirinzoni 🔨	2	1	5	2	1	X	X	X	11
(Sweden) Team Hasselborg	0	0	0	0	0	X	X	X	0

==== Draw 2 ====
Tuesday, May 2, 3:00 pm

Sheet B	1	2	3	4	5	6	7	8	Final
(Manitoba) Kaitlyn Lawes	0	1	0	0	2	1	0	0	4
(British Columbia) Clancy Grandy 🔨	1	0	2	1	0	0	2	2	8

Sheet D	1	2	3	4	5	6	7	8	Final
(Ontario) Rachel Homan 🔨	0	0	2	0	5	0	0	X	7
(United States) Tabitha Peterson	0	0	0	2	0	1	1	X	4

==== Draw 3 ====
Tuesday, May 2, 6:30 pm

Sheet B	1	2	3	4	5	6	7	8	Final
(Manitoba) Kerri Einarson	0	0	3	0	1	0	3	0	7
(Ontario) Isabelle Ladouceur 🔨	1	1	0	0	0	2	0	0	4

Sheet C	1	2	3	4	5	6	7	8	Final
(Manitoba) Jennifer Jones 🔨	2	0	3	2	0	2	X	X	9
(Norway) Marianne Rørvik	0	1	0	0	1	0	X	X	2

==== Draw 4 ====
Wednesday, May 3, 8:30 am

Sheet A	1	2	3	4	5	6	7	8	Final
(Japan) Satsuki Fujisawa 🔨	0	1	0	0	2	0	1	1	5
(Manitoba) Kaitlyn Lawes	0	0	0	1	0	1	0	0	2

Sheet C	1	2	3	4	5	6	7	8	Final
(Switzerland) Silvana Tirinzoni 🔨	0	1	0	0	0	1	0	0	2
(Manitoba) Jennifer Jones	1	0	1	0	0	0	2	1	5

==== Draw 5 ====
Wednesday, May 3, 12:00 pm

Sheet B	1	2	3	4	5	6	7	8	Final
(Sweden) Team Hasselborg	0	0	3	0	0	0	2	0	5
(United States) Tabitha Peterson 🔨	1	2	0	1	1	3	0	1	9

Sheet D	1	2	3	4	5	6	7	8	Final
(Manitoba) Kerri Einarson 🔨	2	0	0	2	1	0	2	X	7
(British Columbia) Clancy Grandy	0	2	0	0	0	1	0	X	3

==== Draw 6 ====
Wednesday, May 3, 4:00 pm

Sheet B	1	2	3	4	5	6	7	8	Final
(Ontario) Rachel Homan	0	0	0	0	0	X	X	X	0
(Manitoba) Jennifer Jones 🔨	0	2	3	1	4	X	X	X	10

Sheet D	1	2	3	4	5	6	7	8	Final
(Japan) Satsuki Fujisawa 🔨	2	0	0	0	1	0	X	X	3
(Ontario) Isabelle Ladouceur	0	3	1	2	0	3	X	X	9

==== Draw 7 ====
Wednesday, May 3, 8:00 pm

Sheet A	1	2	3	4	5	6	7	8	Final
(United States) Tabitha Peterson 🔨	1	0	1	0	2	1	0	X	5
(Norway) Marianne Rørvik	0	1	0	1	0	0	1	X	3

Sheet C	1	2	3	4	5	6	7	8	Final
(Manitoba) Kerri Einarson 🔨	1	0	0	1	1	2	1	X	6
(South Korea) Gim Eun-ji	0	0	1	0	0	0	0	X	1

==== Draw 8 ====
Thursday, May 4, 8:30 am

Sheet A	1	2	3	4	5	6	7	8	9	Final
(Ontario) Rachel Homan	0	1	0	1	0	3	0	3	0	8
(Sweden) Team Hasselborg 🔨	1	0	4	0	2	0	1	0	2	10

Sheet C	1	2	3	4	5	6	7	8	Final
(British Columbia) Clancy Grandy	0	1	0	3	3	X	X	X	7
(Ontario) Isabelle Ladouceur 🔨	0	0	1	0	0	X	X	X	1

==== Draw 9 ====
Thursday, May 4, 12:00 pm

Sheet A	1	2	3	4	5	6	7	8	9	Final
(Switzerland) Silvana Tirinzoni	0	0	2	0	1	0	0	2	0	5
(United States) Tabitha Peterson 🔨	1	1	0	1	0	1	1	0	2	7

Sheet D	1	2	3	4	5	6	7	8	Final
(South Korea) Gim Eun-ji 🔨	5	0	1	1	0	3	X	X	10
(Manitoba) Kaitlyn Lawes	0	1	0	0	1	0	X	X	2

==== Draw 10 ====
Thursday, May 4, 4:00 pm

Sheet A	1	2	3	4	5	6	7	8	Final
(Japan) Satsuki Fujisawa	0	0	0	1	1	1	0	X	3
(British Columbia) Clancy Grandy 🔨	2	1	1	0	0	0	3	X	7

Sheet C	1	2	3	4	5	6	7	8	Final
(Sweden) Team Hasselborg 🔨	0	2	0	0	1	1	1	1	6
(Manitoba) Jennifer Jones	2	0	1	1	0	0	0	0	4

==== Draw 11 ====
Thursday, May 4, 8:00 pm

Sheet A	1	2	3	4	5	6	7	8	Final
(Manitoba) Kerri Einarson	1	0	1	0	0	2	0	X	4
(Manitoba) Kaitlyn Lawes 🔨	0	1	0	4	1	0	1	X	7

Sheet D	1	2	3	4	5	6	7	8	Final
(Switzerland) Silvana Tirinzoni 🔨	2	0	1	0	0	1	0	0	4
(Norway) Marianne Rørvik	0	2	0	1	1	0	2	0	6

==== Draw 12 ====
Friday, May 5, 8:30 am

Sheet C	1	2	3	4	5	6	7	8	Final
(South Korea) Gim Eun-ji	0	1	0	4	0	0	0	3	8
(Ontario) Isabelle Ladouceur 🔨	2	0	1	0	1	0	3	0	7

Sheet D	1	2	3	4	5	6	7	8	Final
(United States) Tabitha Peterson	0	3	0	1	0	2	0	1	7
(Manitoba) Jennifer Jones 🔨	1	0	1	0	2	0	2	0	6

==== Draw 13 ====
Friday, May 5, 12:00 pm

Sheet A	1	2	3	4	5	6	7	8	Final
(Ontario) Rachel Homan	0	0	2	0	3	0	1	X	6
(Norway) Marianne Rørvik 🔨	0	1	0	1	0	1	0	X	3

Sheet C	1	2	3	4	5	6	7	8	Final
(Manitoba) Kerri Einarson	0	0	2	0	0	2	0	X	4
(Japan) Satsuki Fujisawa 🔨	0	1	0	4	1	0	3	X	9

==== Draw 14 ====
Friday, May 5, 4:00 pm

Sheet B	1	2	3	4	5	6	7	8	Final
(South Korea) Gim Eun-ji 🔨	2	0	2	0	2	0	0	1	7
(British Columbia) Clancy Grandy	0	1	0	1	0	2	1	0	5

==== Draw 15 ====
Friday, May 5, 8:00 pm

Sheet B	1	2	3	4	5	6	7	8	Final
(Sweden) Team Hasselborg	0	0	2	3	0	1	0	X	6
(Norway) Marianne Rørvik 🔨	0	1	0	0	1	0	1	X	3

Sheet C	1	2	3	4	5	6	7	8	Final
(Ontario) Rachel Homan 🔨	2	0	1	0	3	0	1	X	7
(Switzerland) Silvana Tirinzoni	0	3	0	1	0	1	0	X	5

Sheet D	1	2	3	4	5	6	7	8	Final
(Manitoba) Kaitlyn Lawes 🔨	0	3	0	3	0	1	1	1	9
(Ontario) Isabelle Ladouceur	0	0	2	0	3	0	0	0	5

=== Tiebreakers ===
Saturday, May 6, 12:00 pm

Sheet C	1	2	3	4	5	6	7	8	9	Final
(British Columbia) Clancy Grandy	0	2	0	2	0	2	0	2	0	8
(Manitoba) Jennifer Jones 🔨	3	0	2	0	2	0	1	0	1	9

Player percentages
(British Columbia) Team Grandy		(Manitoba) Team Jones	
Sarah Loken	99%	Emily Zacharias	88%
Lindsay Dubue	89%	Mackenzie Zacharias	92%
Kayla MacMillan	86%	Karlee Burgess	76%
Clancy Grandy	86%	Jennifer Jones	78%
Total	90%	Total	83%

Sheet D	1	2	3	4	5	6	7	8	Final
(Sweden) Team Hasselborg	3	0	4	0	0	2	X	X	9
(South Korea) Gim Eun-ji 🔨	0	1	0	2	1	0	X	X	4

Player percentages
(Sweden) Team Hasselborg		(South Korea) Team Gim	
Sofia Mabergs	75%	Seol Ye-eun	75%
Johanna Heldin	88%	Kim Su-ji	63%
Agnes Knochenhauer	94%	Kim Min-ji	69%
Sara McManus	81%	Gim Eun-ji	73%
Total	84%	Total	70%

=== Playoffs ===
Quarterfinals
4	(Ontario) Rachel Homan	7
5	(Sweden) Team Hasselborg	6
3	(Japan) Satsuki Fujisawa	7
6	(Manitoba) Jennifer Jones	3

Semifinals
1	(United States) Tabitha Peterson	2
4	(Ontario) Rachel Homan	9
2	(Manitoba) Kerri Einarson	12
3	(Japan) Satsuki Fujisawa	0

Final
4	(Ontario) Rachel Homan	6
2	(Manitoba) Kerri Einarson	5

==== Quarterfinals ====
Saturday, May 6, 4:00 pm

Sheet A	1	2	3	4	5	6	7	8	Final
(Ontario) Rachel Homan	0	1	0	5	0	1	0	0	7
(Sweden) Team Hasselborg 🔨	0	0	1	0	2	0	2	1	6

Player percentages
(Ontario) Rachel Homan		(Sweden) Team Hasselborg	
Rachelle Brown	89%	Sofia Mabergs	83%
Emma Miskew	86%	Johanna Heldin	64%
Tracy Fleury	80%	Agnes Knochenhauer	80%
Rachel Homan	77%	Sara McManus	64%
Total	83%	Total	73%

Sheet B	1	2	3	4	5	6	7	8	Final
(Japan) Satsuki Fujisawa 🔨	2	0	2	0	3	0	X	X	7
(Manitoba) Jennifer Jones	0	1	0	1	0	1	X	X	3

Player percentages
(Japan) Team Fujisawa		(Manitoba) Team Jones	
Yurika Yoshida	96%	Lauren Lenentine	96%
Yumi Suzuki	75%	Mackenzie Zacharias	81%
Chinami Yoshida	83%	Karlee Burgess	79%
Satsuki Fujisawa	94%	Jennifer Jones	75%
Total	87%	Total	83%

==== Semifinals ====
Saturday, May 6, 8:00 pm

Sheet A	1	2	3	4	5	6	7	8	Final
(Manitoba) Kerri Einarson 🔨	0	2	4	3	3	X	X	X	12
(Japan) Satsuki Fujisawa	0	0	0	0	0	X	X	X	0

Player percentages
(Manitoba) Team Einarson		(Japan) Team Fujisawa	
Dawn McEwen	88%	Yurika Yoshida	88%
Shannon Birchard	68%	Yumi Suzuki	68%
Val Sweeting	88%	Chinami Yoshida	80%
Kerri Einarson	93%	Satsuki Fujisawa	48%
Total	84%	Total	71%

Sheet D	1	2	3	4	5	6	7	8	Final
(United States) Tabitha Peterson 🔨	1	0	1	0	0	0	X	X	2
(Ontario) Rachel Homan	0	1	0	4	1	3	X	X	9

Player percentages
(United States) Team Peterson		(Ontario) Team Homan	
–		Rachelle Brown	83%
Tara Peterson	89%	Emma Miskew	96%
Becca Hamilton	57%	Tracy Fleury	83%
Tabitha Peterson	54%	Rachel Homan	92%
Total	68%	Total	89%

==== Final ====
Sunday, May 7, 3:00 pm

Sheet B	1	2	3	4	5	6	7	8	9	Final
(Ontario) Rachel Homan 🔨	0	0	0	1	1	1	0	2	1	6
(Manitoba) Kerri Einarson	1	1	2	0	0	0	1	0	0	5

Player percentages
(Ontario) Team Homan		(Manitoba) Team Einarson	
Rachelle Brown	97%	Dawn McEwen	86%
Emma Miskew	72%	Shannon Birchard	89%
Tracy Fleury	96%	Val Sweeting	82%
Rachel Homan	78%	Kerri Einarson	68%
Total	86%	Total	81%

=== Player percentages ===
Final Round Robin Percentages

Leads	%
(Ontario) Rachelle Brown	91
(Manitoba) Emily Zacharias	90
(Ontario) Michaela Robert	89
(United States) Tara Peterson	87
(South Korea) Seol Ye-eun	86
(British Columbia) Sarah Loken	86
(Manitoba) Kristin MacCuish	86
(Japan) Yurika Yoshida	85
(Sweden) Sofia Mabergs	85
(Switzerland) Rachel Erickson	85
(Manitoba) Dawn McEwen	82
(Norway) Martine Rønning	81

Seconds	%
(Ontario) Emma Miskew	85
(Switzerland) Carole Howald	85
(Manitoba) Shannon Birchard	82
(Manitoba) Mackenzie Zacharias	81
(Manitoba) Jolene Campbell	81
(South Korea) Kim Su-ji	80
(Japan) Yumi Suzuki	78
(British Columbia) Lindsay Dubue	78
(Norway) Mille Haslev Nordbye	76
(Sweden) Johanna Heldin	71
(Ontario) Jamie Smith	70

Thirds	%
(United States) Becca Hamilton	84
(British Columbia) Kayla MacMillan	84
(Japan) Chinami Yoshida	80
(South Korea) Kim Min-ji	80
(Ontario) Tracy Fleury	79
(Manitoba) Karlee Burgess	79
(Manitoba) Val Sweeting	78
(Norway) Marianne Rørvik (Skip)	78
(Sweden) Agnes Knochenhauer (Skip)	75
(Manitoba) Laura Walker	75
(Switzerland) Silvana Tirinzoni (Skip)	75
(Ontario) Grace Lloyd	70

Skips	%
(United States) Tabitha Peterson	80
(Ontario) Rachel Homan	79
(Manitoba) Kerri Einarson	77
(Japan) Satsuki Fujisawa	76
(British Columbia) Clancy Grandy	76
(Switzerland) Alina Pätz (Fourth)	76
(Manitoba) Jennifer Jones	74
(South Korea) Gim Eun-ji	74
(Sweden) Sara McManus (Fourth)	72
(Norway) Kristin Skaslien (Fourth)	70
(Manitoba) Kaitlyn Lawes	62
(Ontario) Isabelle Ladouceur	62
