= 2023 Canadian Open (curling) =

Grand Slam of Curling event

2023 Co-op Canadian Open
- Host city: Camrose, Alberta
- Arena: Encana Arena
- Dates: January 10–15
- Men's winner: (Alberta) Team Bottcher
- Curling club: Calgary CC, Calgary
- Skip: Brendan Bottcher
- Third: Marc Kennedy
- Second: Brett Gallant
- Lead: Ben Hebert
- Finalist: (Sweden) Niklas Edin
- Women's winner: (Japan) Team Fujisawa
- Curling club: Tokoro CC, Kitami
- Skip: Satsuki Fujisawa
- Third: Chinami Yoshida
- Second: Yumi Suzuki
- Lead: Yurika Yoshida
- Alternate: Kotomi Ishizaki
- Coach: J. D. Lind
- Finalist: (Manitoba) Kerri Einarson

The 2023 Co-op Canadian Open was held from January 10 to 15 at the Encana Arena in Camrose, Alberta. It was the fourth Grand Slam event and third major of the 2022–23 curling season.

In the women's final, Satsuki Fujisawa and her team from Japan became the first Asian team to win a Grand Slam title (excluding defunct Slams; China's Wang Bingyu had won the 2010 Curlers Corner Autumn Gold Curling Classic, which was considered a Slam at the time.), defeating the Canadian champion Kerri Einarson rink. On the men's side, the home province Brendan Bottcher rink defeated Sweden's Niklas Edin team in the final.

== Qualification ==
Sixteen teams competed in the Canadian Open. They included the seven top-ranked teams on the World Curling Federation's Order of Merit rankings as of December 5, 2022, the seven top teams on the Year-to-Date rankings as of December 5, the Tier 2 winner of the 2022 Tour Challenge, and a sponsor's exemption. The first matches were set per the rankings on December 12, 2022.

=== Men ===
Top men's teams as of December 5:

#	Order of Merit	Year-to-Date
1	1. (Newfoundland and Labrador) Brad Gushue	1. (Sweden) Niklas Edin
2	2. (Sweden) ~~Niklas Edin~~; 3. (Scotland) Bruce Mouat	2. (Manitoba) Matt Dunstone
3	4. (Alberta) Brendan Bottcher	3. (Newfoundland and Labrador) ~~Brad Gushue~~; 4. (Switzerland) Yannick Schwaller
4	5. (Manitoba) ~~Matt Dunstone~~; 6. (Alberta) Kevin Koe	5. ~~(Alberta) Kevin Koe~~; 6. (Italy) Joël Retornaz
5	7. (Italy) ~~Joël Retornaz~~; 8. (Manitoba) Reid Carruthers	7. (Alberta) ~~Brendan Bottcher~~; 8. (United States) ~~Korey Dropkin~~; 9. (Manitoba) ~~Reid Carruthers~~; 10. (Norway) ~~Steffen Walstad~~; 11. (Scotland) Ross Whyte
6	9. (Switzerland) ~~Yannick Schwaller~~; 10. (Scotland) ~~Ross Whyte~~; 11. (Saskatchewan) Colton Flasch	12. (Scotland) ~~Bruce Mouat~~; 13. (Norway) Magnus Ramsfjell
7	12. (United States) ~~Korey Dropkin~~; 13. (Ontario) John Epping	14. (Netherlands) Wouter Gösgens

Tour Challenge Tier 2 winner:

- (United States) Korey Dropkin

Sponsor's exemption:

- (Ontario) Tanner Horgan

=== Women ===
Top women's teams as of December 5:

#	Order of Merit	Year-to-Date
1	1. (Manitoba) Kerri Einarson	1. (Switzerland) Silvana Tirinzoni
2	2. (Sweden) Anna Hasselborg	2. (Ontario) Tracy Fleury
3	3. (Ontario) ~~Tracy Fleury~~; 4. (Switzerland) ~~Silvana Tirinzoni~~; 5. (Japan) Satsuki Fujisawa	3. (South Korea) Gim Eun-ji
4	6. (Manitoba) Kaitlyn Lawes	4. ~~(Manitoba) Kerri Einarson~~; 5. (Manitoba) Jennifer Jones
5	7. (South Korea) ~~Gim Eun-ji~~; 8. (Manitoba) ~~Jennifer Jones~~; 9. (South Korea) ~~Kim Eun-jung~~; 10. (Alberta) Casey Scheidegger	6. (Japan) ~~Satsuki Fujisawa~~; 7. (Manitoba) ~~Kaitlyn Lawes~~; 8. (British Columbia) ~~Clancy Grandy~~; 9. (Alberta) ~~Casey Scheidegger~~; 10. (Switzerland) Raphaela Keiser
6	11. (Sweden) Isabella Wranå	11. (Manitoba) Abby Ackland
7	12. (Switzerland) ~~Raphaela Keiser~~; 13. (United States) Tabitha Peterson	12. (Sweden) ~~Anna Hasselborg~~; 13. (Ontario) Isabelle Ladouceur

Tour Challenge Tier 2 winner:

- (British Columbia) ~~Clancy Grandy~~
- (Italy) Stefania Constantini (Note: Clancy Grandy qualified for the Canadian Open by winning the 2022 Tour Challenge Tier 2 event, but declined the invitation due to a conflict with the 2023 British Columbia Scotties Tournament of Hearts. The spot was given to the next ranked team on the Year-to-Date standings, Stefania Constantini.)

Sponsor's exemption:

- N/A
- (Switzerland) Michèle Jäggi (Note: No sponsor's exemption was qualified on the women's side. The spot was given to the next ranked team on the Year-to-Date standings, Michèle Jäggi.)

== Men ==
=== Teams ===
The teams are listed as follows:

Skip	Third	Second	Lead	Alternate	Locale
Brendan Bottcher	Marc Kennedy	Brett Gallant	Ben Hebert		Calgary, Alberta
Reid Carruthers	Brad Jacobs (Note: Brad Jacobs replaced Jason Gunnlaugson, who parted ways with Team Carruthers following the 2022 Masters.)	Derek Samagalski	Connor Njegovan		Winnipeg, Manitoba
Korey Dropkin (Fourth)	Andrew Stopera (Skip)	Mark Fenner	Thomas Howell		(United States) Duluth, Minnesota
Matt Dunstone	B. J. Neufeld	Colton Lott	Ryan Harnden		Winnipeg, Manitoba
Niklas Edin	Oskar Eriksson	Rasmus Wranå	Christoffer Sundgren		Karlstad, Sweden
John Epping	Mat Camm	Pat Janssen	Scott Chadwick		Toronto, Ontario
Colton Flasch	Catlin Schneider	Kevin Marsh	Dan Marsh		Saskatoon, Saskatchewan
Wouter Gösgens	Laurens Hoekman	Jaap van Dorp	Alexander Magan	Tobias van den Hurk	Zoetermeer, Netherlands
Brad Gushue	Mark Nichols	E. J. Harnden	Geoff Walker		St. John's, Newfoundland and Labrador
Tanner Horgan (Fourth)	Darren Moulding (Skip)	Jacob Horgan	Colin Hodgson		Sudbury, Ontario
Kevin Koe	Tyler Tardi	Brad Thiessen	Karrick Martin		Calgary, Alberta
Bruce Mouat	Grant Hardie	Bobby Lammie	Hammy McMillan Jr.		Stirling, Scotland
Magnus Ramsfjell	Martin Sesaker	Bendik Ramsfjell	Gaute Nepstad		Trondheim, Norway
Joël Retornaz	Amos Mosaner	Sebastiano Arman	Mattia Giovanella		Trentino, Italy
Benoît Schwarz (Fourth)	Yannick Schwaller (Skip)	Sven Michel	Pablo Lachat		Geneva, Switzerland
Ross Whyte (Fourth)	Robin Brydone (Skip)	Duncan McFadzean	Euan Kyle		Stirling, Scotland

=== Knockout brackets ===
==== A event ====
A Event	Qualifier 1
1	(Sweden) Niklas Edin	6
1	(Ontario) Team Horgan	4	9	(Sweden) Niklas Edin	5
2	(Scotland) Bruce Mouat	2	9	(Norway) Magnus Ramsfjell	4
2	(Norway) Magnus Ramsfjell	4	13	(Sweden) Niklas Edin	6
3	(Newfoundland and Labrador) Brad Gushue	4	13	(Newfoundland and Labrador) Brad Gushue	3
3	(Netherlands) Wouter Gösgens	2	10	(Newfoundland and Labrador) Brad Gushue	5
4	(Switzerland) Yannick Schwaller	4	10	(Scotland) Team Whyte	1
4	(Scotland) Team Whyte	5

A Event	Qualifier 2
5	(Manitoba) Matt Dunstone	10
5	(Saskatchewan) Colton Flasch	5	11	(Manitoba) Matt Dunstone	2
6	(Alberta) Kevin Koe	2	11	(United States) Team Dropkin	5
6	(United States) Team Dropkin	3	14	(United States) Team Dropkin	2
7	(Italy) Joël Retornaz	4	14	(Alberta) Brendan Bottcher	4
7	(Ontario) John Epping	6	12	(Ontario) John Epping	2
8	(Alberta) Brendan Bottcher	9	12	(Alberta) Brendan Bottcher	7
8	(Manitoba) Reid Carruthers	3

==== B event ====
B Event						Qualifier 3
15	(Ontario) Team Horgan	2
15	(Scotland) Bruce Mouat	6	19	(Scotland) Bruce Mouat	8
16	(Netherlands) Wouter Gösgens	3	19	(Switzerland) Yannick Schwaller	5
16	(Switzerland) Yannick Schwaller	6				23	(Scotland) Bruce Mouat	4
						23	(United States) Team Dropkin	3

B Event						Qualifier 4
17	(Saskatchewan) Colton Flasch	6
17	(Alberta) Kevin Koe	7	20	(Alberta) Kevin Koe	6
18	(Italy) Joël Retornaz	6	20	(Italy) Joël Retornaz	9
18	(Manitoba) Reid Carruthers	3				24	(Italy) Joël Retornaz	5
						24	(Newfoundland and Labrador) Brad Gushue	6

B Event			Qualifier 5
21	(Norway) Magnus Ramsfjell	5
21	(Scotland) Team Whyte	8	25	(Scotland) Team Whyte	2
22	(Manitoba) Matt Dunstone	8	25	(Manitoba) Matt Dunstone	5
22	(Ontario) John Epping	5

==== C event ====
C Event						Qualifier 6
26	(Ontario) Team Horgan	8
26	(Netherlands) Wouter Gösgens	6	28	(Ontario) Team Horgan	9
			28	(Norway) Magnus Ramsfjell	7
						31	(Ontario) Team Horgan	6
						31	(Italy) Joël Retornaz	8

C Event						Qualifier 7
27	(Saskatchewan) Colton Flasch	5
27	(Manitoba) Reid Carruthers	7	29	(Manitoba) Reid Carruthers	6
			29	(Ontario) John Epping	4
						32	(Manitoba) Reid Carruthers	4
						32	(United States) Team Dropkin	5

C Event			Qualifier 8
30	(Switzerland) Yannick Schwaller	6
30	(Alberta) Kevin Koe	3	33	(Switzerland) Yannick Schwaller	7
			33	(Scotland) Team Whyte	2

=== Knockout results ===
All draw times are listed in Mountain Time (UTC−07:00).

==== Draw 3 ====
Tuesday, January 10, 3:00 pm

Sheet A	1	2	3	4	5	6	7	8	Final
(Sweden) Niklas Edin 🔨	1	0	1	0	1	0	3	0	6
(Ontario) Team Horgan	0	1	0	0	0	2	0	1	4

Sheet B	1	2	3	4	5	6	7	8	Final
(Scotland) Bruce Mouat	0	0	0	0	2	0	0	0	2
(Norway) Magnus Ramsfjell 🔨	0	0	1	0	0	2	0	1	4

Sheet C	1	2	3	4	5	6	7	8	Final
(Manitoba) Matt Dunstone 🔨	2	0	2	0	2	0	4	X	10
(Saskatchewan) Colton Flasch	0	2	0	1	0	2	0	X	5

Sheet D	1	2	3	4	5	6	7	8	Final
(Alberta) Kevin Koe	0	0	1	0	0	1	0	0	2
(United States) Team Dropkin 🔨	0	0	0	0	1	0	0	2	3

==== Draw 4 ====
Tuesday, January 10, 6:30 pm

Sheet A	1	2	3	4	5	6	7	8	Final
(Newfoundland and Labrador) Brad Gushue 🔨	1	0	1	0	1	0	1	X	4
(Netherlands) Wouter Gösgens	0	0	0	1	0	1	0	X	2

Sheet B	1	2	3	4	5	6	7	8	Final
(Switzerland) Yannick Schwaller	0	0	2	1	0	0	1	0	4
(Scotland) Team Whyte 🔨	0	1	0	0	0	1	0	3	5

Sheet C	1	2	3	4	5	6	7	8	Final
(Italy) Joël Retornaz	0	1	0	0	1	0	2	0	4
(Ontario) John Epping 🔨	2	0	0	1	0	2	0	1	6

Sheet D	1	2	3	4	5	6	7	8	Final
(Alberta) Brendan Bottcher 🔨	0	2	0	6	0	1	X	X	9
(Manitoba) Reid Carruthers	0	0	1	0	2	0	X	X	3

==== Draw 7 ====
Wednesday, January 11, 4:00 pm

Sheet A	1	2	3	4	5	6	7	8	Final
(Italy) Joël Retornaz 🔨	0	1	0	0	2	0	1	2	6
(Manitoba) Reid Carruthers	0	0	1	1	0	1	0	0	3

Sheet B	1	2	3	4	5	6	7	8	Final
(Ontario) John Epping	0	1	0	1	0	0	X	X	2
(Alberta) Brendan Bottcher 🔨	2	0	2	0	2	1	X	X	7

Sheet C	1	2	3	4	5	6	7	8	Final
(Netherlands) Wouter Gösgens 🔨	1	0	1	0	0	1	0	X	3
(Switzerland) Yannick Schwaller	0	3	0	1	1	0	1	X	6

Sheet D	1	2	3	4	5	6	7	8	Final
(Newfoundland and Labrador) Brad Gushue 🔨	1	0	0	1	3	0	X	X	5
(Scotland) Team Whyte	0	0	0	0	0	1	X	X	1

==== Draw 8 ====
Wednesday, January 11, 8:00 pm

Sheet A	1	2	3	4	5	6	7	8	Final
(Saskatchewan) Colton Flasch	0	2	0	2	0	1	0	1	6
(Alberta) Kevin Koe 🔨	1	0	2	0	3	0	1	0	7

Sheet B	1	2	3	4	5	6	7	8	Final
(Manitoba) Matt Dunstone	0	0	0	0	2	0	0	X	2
(United States) Team Dropkin 🔨	0	0	0	1	0	3	1	X	5

Sheet C	1	2	3	4	5	6	7	8	Final
(Ontario) Team Horgan 🔨	0	1	0	0	0	0	1	X	2
(Scotland) Bruce Mouat	1	0	1	1	2	1	0	X	6

Sheet D	1	2	3	4	5	6	7	8	Final
(Sweden) Niklas Edin	0	2	1	0	1	0	0	1	5
(Norway) Magnus Ramsfjell 🔨	2	0	0	1	0	0	1	0	4

==== Draw 10 ====
Thursday, January 12, 12:00 pm

Sheet A	1	2	3	4	5	6	7	8	Final
(Manitoba) Matt Dunstone 🔨	3	0	1	0	2	2	0	X	8
(Ontario) John Epping	0	2	0	2	0	0	1	X	5

Sheet B	1	2	3	4	5	6	7	8	Final
(Alberta) Kevin Koe	0	2	0	3	0	1	0	X	6
(Italy) Joël Retornaz 🔨	2	0	1	0	3	0	3	X	9

Sheet C	1	2	3	4	5	6	7	8	Final
(Norway) Magnus Ramsfjell 🔨	0	1	0	2	0	2	0	X	5
(Scotland) Team Whyte	2	0	2	0	2	0	2	X	8

Sheet D	1	2	3	4	5	6	7	8	Final
(Scotland) Bruce Mouat	0	4	1	0	1	0	2	X	8
(Switzerland) Yannick Schwaller 🔨	1	0	0	3	0	1	0	X	5

==== Draw 12 ====
Thursday, January 12, 8:00 pm

Sheet A	1	2	3	4	5	6	7	8	Final
(United States) Team Dropkin 🔨	0	0	0	1	0	0	1	0	2
(Alberta) Brendan Bottcher	0	1	1	0	0	1	0	1	4

Sheet B	1	2	3	4	5	6	7	8	Final
(Saskatchewan) Colton Flasch 🔨	3	0	0	1	1	0	0	0	5
(Manitoba) Reid Carruthers	0	2	1	0	0	2	1	1	7

Sheet C	1	2	3	4	5	6	7	8	Final
(Sweden) Niklas Edin	0	0	2	0	3	0	1	X	6
(Newfoundland and Labrador) Brad Gushue 🔨	0	1	0	1	0	1	0	X	3

Sheet D	1	2	3	4	5	6	7	8	9	Final
(Ontario) Team Horgan	0	2	1	0	1	2	0	0	2	8
(Netherlands) Wouter Gösgens 🔨	1	0	0	1	0	0	3	1	0	6

==== Draw 13 ====
Friday, January 13, 8:30 am

Sheet B	1	2	3	4	5	6	7	8	Final
(Ontario) Team Horgan 🔨	0	5	0	0	2	0	0	2	9
(Norway) Magnus Ramsfjell	1	0	2	1	0	2	1	0	7

Sheet C	1	2	3	4	5	6	7	8	Final
(Manitoba) Reid Carruthers 🔨	0	2	0	0	1	0	0	3	6
(Ontario) John Epping	0	0	2	0	0	2	0	0	4

==== Draw 14 ====
Friday, January 13, 12:30 pm

Sheet A	1	2	3	4	5	6	7	8	Final
(Switzerland) Yannick Schwaller	1	0	2	1	0	2	0	X	6
(Alberta) Kevin Koe 🔨	0	1	0	0	1	0	1	X	3

Sheet B	1	2	3	4	5	6	7	8	Final
(Scotland) Team Whyte	0	0	0	2	0	0	0	X	2
(Manitoba) Matt Dunstone 🔨	0	0	1	0	0	3	1	X	5

Sheet C	1	2	3	4	5	6	7	8	Final
(Scotland) Bruce Mouat 🔨	0	1	0	1	0	1	0	1	4
(United States) Team Dropkin	1	0	0	0	1	0	1	0	3

Sheet D	1	2	3	4	5	6	7	8	Final
(Italy) Joël Retornaz	0	1	0	2	0	2	0	0	5
(Newfoundland and Labrador) Brad Gushue 🔨	2	0	1	0	2	0	0	1	6

==== Draw 16 ====
Friday, January 13, 8:30 pm

Sheet B	1	2	3	4	5	6	7	8	Final
(Manitoba) Reid Carruthers 🔨	0	1	0	1	1	0	1	0	4
(United States) Team Dropkin	0	0	1	0	0	3	0	1	5

Sheet C	1	2	3	4	5	6	7	8	Final
(Ontario) Team Horgan 🔨	2	0	2	0	0	0	2	X	6
(Italy) Joël Retornaz	0	3	0	0	3	2	0	X	8

Sheet D	1	2	3	4	5	6	7	8	Final
(Switzerland) Yannick Schwaller	0	1	0	2	0	2	2	X	7
(Scotland) Team Whyte 🔨	0	0	1	0	1	0	0	X	2

=== Playoffs ===
Quarterfinals
A1	(Sweden) Niklas Edin	6
C2	(United States) Team Dropkin	2
B2	(Newfoundland and Labrador) Brad Gushue	6
B1	(Scotland) Bruce Mouat	2
A2	(Alberta) Brendan Bottcher	5
C3	(Switzerland) Yannick Schwaller	0
B3	(Manitoba) Matt Dunstone	2
C1	(Italy) Joël Retornaz	8

Semifinals
A1	(Sweden) Niklas Edin	8
B2	(Newfoundland and Labrador) Brad Gushue	5
A2	(Alberta) Brendan Bottcher	3
C1	(Italy) Joël Retornaz	2

Final
A1	(Sweden) Niklas Edin	3
A2	(Alberta) Brendan Bottcher	5

==== Quarterfinals ====
Saturday, January 14, 12:00 pm

Sheet A	1	2	3	4	5	6	7	8	Final
(Manitoba) Matt Dunstone 🔨	0	0	1	0	1	X	X	X	2
(Italy) Joël Retornaz	3	2	0	3	0	X	X	X	8

Player percentages
(Manitoba) Team Dunstone		(Italy) Team Retornaz	
Ryan Harnden	100%	Mattia Giovanella	95%
Colton Lott	85%	Sebastiano Arman	90%
B. J. Neufeld	88%	Amos Mosaner	83%
Matt Dunstone	63%	Joël Retornaz	90%
Total	84%	Total	89%

Sheet B	1	2	3	4	5	6	7	8	Final
(Alberta) Brendan Bottcher 🔨	0	0	0	3	0	2	X	X	5
(Switzerland) Yannick Schwaller	0	0	0	0	0	0	X	X	0

Player percentages
(Alberta) Team Bottcher		(Switzerland) Team Schwaller	
Ben Hebert	96%	Pablo Lachat	96%
Brett Gallant	92%	Sven Michel	85%
Marc Kennedy	96%	Yannick Schwaller	88%
Brendan Bottcher	95%	Benoît Schwarz	73%
Total	95%	Total	86%

Sheet C	1	2	3	4	5	6	7	8	Final
(Sweden) Niklas Edin 🔨	2	0	1	0	0	1	0	2	6
(United States) Team Dropkin	0	1	0	1	0	0	0	0	2

Player percentages
(Sweden) Team Edin		(United States) Team Dropkin	
Christoffer Sundgren	88%	Thomas Howell	92%
Rasmus Wranå	98%	Mark Fenner	77%
Oskar Eriksson	91%	Andrew Stopera	88%
Niklas Edin	95%	Korey Dropkin	81%
Total	93%	Total	84%

Sheet D	1	2	3	4	5	6	7	8	Final
(Newfoundland and Labrador) Brad Gushue 🔨	2	0	0	0	2	1	1	X	6
(Scotland) Bruce Mouat	0	0	2	0	0	0	0	X	2

Player percentages
(Newfoundland and Labrador) Team Gushue		(Scotland) Team Mouat	
Geoff Walker	98%	Hammy McMillan Jr.	77%
E. J. Harnden	80%	Bobby Lammie	73%
Mark Nichols	77%	Grant Hardie	93%
Brad Gushue	84%	Bruce Mouat	54%
Total	85%	Total	75%

==== Semifinals ====
Saturday, January 14, 8:00 pm

Sheet B	1	2	3	4	5	6	7	8	Final
(Sweden) Niklas Edin 🔨	0	2	1	0	3	0	2	X	8
(Newfoundland and Labrador) Brad Gushue	0	0	0	3	0	2	0	X	5

Player percentages
(Sweden) Team Edin		(Newfoundland and Labrador) Team Gushue	
Christoffer Sundgren	89%	Geoff Walker	97%
Rasmus Wranå	89%	E. J. Harnden	92%
Oskar Eriksson	89%	Mark Nichols	75%
Niklas Edin	91%	Brad Gushue	77%
Total	89%	Total	85%

Sheet C	1	2	3	4	5	6	7	8	Final
(Alberta) Brendan Bottcher 🔨	0	2	0	0	0	0	0	1	3
(Italy) Joël Retornaz	0	0	0	0	0	2	0	0	2

Player percentages
(Alberta) Team Bottcher		(Italy) Team Retornaz	
Ben Hebert	97%	Mattia Giovanella	97%
Brett Gallant	91%	Sebastiano Arman	84%
Marc Kennedy	97%	Amos Mosaner	88%
Brendan Bottcher	94%	Joël Retornaz	95%
Total	95%	Total	91%

==== Final ====
Sunday, January 15, 11:00 am

Sheet C	1	2	3	4	5	6	7	8	Final
(Sweden) Niklas Edin	0	2	0	0	0	0	1	X	3
(Alberta) Brendan Bottcher 🔨	1	0	2	1	1	0	0	X	5

Player percentages
(Sweden) Team Edin		(Alberta) Team Bottcher	
Christoffer Sundgren	100%	Ben Hebert	97%
Rasmus Wranå	92%	Brett Gallant	97%
Oskar Eriksson	91%	Marc Kennedy	84%
Niklas Edin	82%	Brendan Bottcher	90%
Total	91%	Total	92%

== Women ==
=== Teams ===
The teams are listed as follows:

Skip	Third	Second	Lead	Alternate	Locale
Meghan Walter	Abby Ackland	Sara Oliver	Mackenzie Elias		Winnipeg, Manitoba
Stefania Constantini	Marta Lo Deserto	Angela Romei	Giulia Zardini Lacedelli		Cortina d'Ampezzo, Italy
Kerri Einarson	Val Sweeting	Shannon Birchard	Briane Harris		Gimli, Manitoba
Satsuki Fujisawa	Chinami Yoshida	Yumi Suzuki	Yurika Yoshida	Kotomi Ishizaki	Kitami, Japan
Gim Eun-ji	Kim Min-ji	Kim Su-ji	Seol Ye-eun	Seol Ye-ji	Uijeongbu, South Korea
Anna Hasselborg	– (Note: Team Hasselborg played with three players as third Sara McManus was on maternity leave.)	Agnes Knochenhauer	Sofia Mabergs		Sundbyberg, Sweden
Rachel Homan (Fourth)	Tracy Fleury (Skip)	Emma Miskew	Sarah Wilkes		Ottawa, Ontario
Michèle Jäggi	Irene Schori	Stefanie Berset	Sarah Müller	Lara Stocker	Bern, Switzerland
Jennifer Jones	Karlee Burgess	Mackenzie Zacharias	Emily Zacharias	Lauren Lenentine	Winnipeg, Manitoba
Selina Witschonke (Fourth)	Elena Mathis	Raphaela Keiser (Skip)	Marina Lörtscher		St. Moritz, Switzerland
Isabelle Ladouceur	Jamie Smith	Grace Lloyd	Rachel Steele		Waterloo, Ontario
Kaitlyn Lawes	Selena Njegovan	Jocelyn Peterman	Kristin MacCuish	Laura Walker (Note: After originally announcing that Laura Walker would spare as third for Team Lawes as Kaitlyn Lawes was out on maternity leave, Lawes returned to the team in time for the event, shifting Walker to alternate.)	Winnipeg, Manitoba
Tabitha Peterson	Cory Thiesse	Becca Hamilton	Tara Peterson		(United States) Chaska, Minnesota
Casey Scheidegger	Kate Hogan	Jessie Haughian	Taylor McDonald		Lethbridge, Alberta
Alina Pätz (Fourth)	Silvana Tirinzoni (Skip)	Carole Howald	Briar Schwaller-Hürlimann		Aarau, Switzerland
Isabella Wranå	Almida de Val	Maria Larsson	Linda Stenlund		Sundbyberg, Sweden

=== Knockout brackets ===
==== A event ====
A Event	Qualifier 1
1	(Ontario) Team Homan	1
1	(United States) Tabitha Peterson	9	9	(United States) Tabitha Peterson	0
2	(Alberta) Casey Scheidegger	6	9	(Sweden) Anna Hasselborg	8
2	(Sweden) Anna Hasselborg	9	13	(Sweden) Anna Hasselborg	2
3	(South Korea) Gim Eun-ji	6	13	(Sweden) Isabella Wranå	4
3	(Italy) Stefania Constantini	4	10	(South Korea) Gim Eun-ji	6
4	(Manitoba) Jennifer Jones	3	10	(Sweden) Isabella Wranå	7
4	(Sweden) Isabella Wranå	7

A Event	Qualifier 2
5	(Switzerland) Silvana Tirinzoni	8
5	(Switzerland) Michèle Jäggi	4	11	(Switzerland) Silvana Tirinzoni	6
6	(Japan) Satsuki Fujisawa	8	11	(Japan) Satsuki Fujisawa	8
6	(Switzerland) Raphaela Keiser	6	14	(Japan) Satsuki Fujisawa	5
7	(Manitoba) Kerri Einarson	8	14	(Manitoba) Kerri Einarson	4
7	(Manitoba) Team Ackland	2	12	(Manitoba) Kerri Einarson	7
8	(Manitoba) Kaitlyn Lawes	7	12	(Manitoba) Kaitlyn Lawes	1
8	(Ontario) Isabelle Ladouceur	5

==== B event ====
B Event						Qualifier 3
15	(Ontario) Team Homan	8
15	(Alberta) Casey Scheidegger	2	19	(Ontario) Team Homan	6
16	(Italy) Stefania Constantini	5	19	(Manitoba) Jennifer Jones	3
16	(Manitoba) Jennifer Jones	6				23	(Ontario) Team Homan	5
						23	(Manitoba) Kerri Einarson	3

B Event						Qualifier 4
17	(Switzerland) Michèle Jäggi	6
17	(Switzerland) Raphaela Keiser	5	20	(Switzerland) Michèle Jäggi	5
18	(Manitoba) Team Ackland	5	20	(Manitoba) Team Ackland	10
18	(Ontario) Isabelle Ladouceur	4				24	(Manitoba) Team Ackland	8
						24	(Sweden) Anna Hasselborg	6

B Event			Qualifier 5
21	(United States) Tabitha Peterson	8
21	(South Korea) Gim Eun-ji	10	25	(South Korea) Gim Eun-ji	6
22	(Switzerland) Silvana Tirinzoni	2	25	(Manitoba) Kaitlyn Lawes	3
22	(Manitoba) Kaitlyn Lawes	7

==== C event ====
C Event						Qualifier 6
26	(Alberta) Casey Scheidegger	5
26	(Italy) Stefania Constantini	6	28	(Italy) Stefania Constantini	6
			28	(United States) Tabitha Peterson	5
						31	(Italy) Stefania Constantini	3
						31	(Sweden) Anna Hasselborg	6

C Event						Qualifier 7
27	(Switzerland) Raphaela Keiser	10
27	(Ontario) Isabelle Ladouceur	2	29	(Switzerland) Raphaela Keiser	4
			29	(Switzerland) Silvana Tirinzoni	3
						32	(Switzerland) Raphaela Keiser	4
						32	(Manitoba) Kerri Einarson	13

C Event			Qualifier 8
30	(Manitoba) Jennifer Jones	8
30	(Switzerland) Michèle Jäggi	4	33	(Manitoba) Jennifer Jones	8
			33	(Manitoba) Kaitlyn Lawes	1

=== Knockout results ===
All draw times are listed in Mountain Time (UTC−07:00).

==== Draw 1 ====
Tuesday, January 10, 8:00 am

Sheet A	1	2	3	4	5	6	7	8	Final
(South Korea) Gim Eun-ji	0	2	0	0	1	1	0	2	6
(Italy) Stefania Constantini 🔨	1	0	0	1	0	0	2	0	4

Sheet B	1	2	3	4	5	6	7	8	Final
(Manitoba) Jennifer Jones 🔨	0	0	1	0	1	0	1	0	3
(Sweden) Isabella Wranå	1	0	0	2	0	1	0	3	7

Sheet C	1	2	3	4	5	6	7	8	Final
(Manitoba) Kerri Einarson 🔨	1	0	3	1	1	0	2	X	8
(Manitoba) Team Ackland	0	1	0	0	0	1	0	X	2

Sheet D	1	2	3	4	5	6	7	8	Final
(Manitoba) Kaitlyn Lawes 🔨	0	2	0	0	4	0	0	1	7
(Ontario) Isabelle Ladouceur	0	0	2	1	0	1	1	0	5

==== Draw 2 ====
Tuesday, January 10, 11:30 am

Sheet A	1	2	3	4	5	6	7	8	Final
(Ontario) Team Homan 🔨	0	1	0	0	0	0	X	X	1
(United States) Tabitha Peterson	1	0	1	2	1	4	X	X	9

Sheet B	1	2	3	4	5	6	7	8	Final
(Alberta) Casey Scheidegger 🔨	1	0	1	1	0	2	1	0	6
(Sweden) Anna Hasselborg	0	2	0	0	3	0	0	4	9

Sheet C	1	2	3	4	5	6	7	8	Final
(Switzerland) Silvana Tirinzoni 🔨	1	0	0	5	1	0	1	X	8
(Switzerland) Michèle Jäggi	0	1	1	0	0	2	0	X	4

Sheet D	1	2	3	4	5	6	7	8	Final
(Japan) Satsuki Fujisawa	0	2	0	1	0	2	0	3	8
(Switzerland) Raphaela Keiser 🔨	1	0	1	0	3	0	1	0	6

==== Draw 5 ====
Wednesday, January 11, 8:30 am

Sheet A	1	2	3	4	5	6	7	8	9	Final
(Switzerland) Michèle Jäggi 🔨	1	1	0	0	1	0	2	0	1	6
(Switzerland) Raphaela Keiser	0	0	1	2	0	1	0	1	0	5

Sheet B	1	2	3	4	5	6	7	8	9	Final
(Switzerland) Silvana Tirinzoni 🔨	1	2	0	1	0	1	1	0	0	6
(Japan) Satsuki Fujisawa	0	0	2	0	1	0	0	3	2	8

Sheet C	1	2	3	4	5	6	7	8	Final
(Ontario) Team Homan 🔨	1	0	0	4	1	2	X	X	8
(Alberta) Casey Scheidegger	0	1	1	0	0	0	X	X	2

Sheet D	1	2	3	4	5	6	7	8	Final
(United States) Tabitha Peterson	0	0	0	0	X	X	X	X	0
(Sweden) Anna Hasselborg 🔨	2	4	1	1	X	X	X	X	8

==== Draw 6 ====
Wednesday, January 11, 12:00 pm

Sheet A	1	2	3	4	5	6	7	8	9	Final
(Manitoba) Team Ackland 🔨	1	0	1	0	1	0	1	0	1	5
(Ontario) Isabelle Ladouceur	0	1	0	1	0	1	0	1	0	4

Sheet B	1	2	3	4	5	6	7	8	Final
(Manitoba) Kerri Einarson 🔨	0	3	1	1	2	X	X	X	7
(Manitoba) Kaitlyn Lawes	1	0	0	0	0	X	X	X	1

Sheet C	1	2	3	4	5	6	7	8	Final
(Italy) Stefania Constantini 🔨	0	1	0	1	0	0	2	1	5
(Manitoba) Jennifer Jones	0	0	2	0	1	3	0	0	6

Sheet D	1	2	3	4	5	6	7	8	Final
(South Korea) Gim Eun-ji	0	0	0	4	0	0	1	1	6
(Sweden) Isabella Wranå 🔨	1	1	1	0	2	2	0	0	7

==== Draw 9 ====
Thursday, January 12, 8:30 am

Sheet A	1	2	3	4	5	6	7	8	Final
(Ontario) Team Homan	0	2	0	2	0	2	0	X	6
(Manitoba) Jennifer Jones 🔨	1	0	1	0	0	0	1	X	3

Sheet B	1	2	3	4	5	6	7	8	Final
(Switzerland) Michèle Jäggi	0	0	1	1	0	3	0	X	5
(Manitoba) Team Ackland 🔨	1	2	0	0	6	0	1	X	10

Sheet C	1	2	3	4	5	6	7	8	Final
(United States) Tabitha Peterson 🔨	1	0	1	0	2	0	4	0	8
(South Korea) Gim Eun-ji	0	2	0	3	0	4	0	1	10

Sheet D	1	2	3	4	5	6	7	8	Final
(Switzerland) Silvana Tirinzoni	0	1	0	1	0	0	X	X	2
(Manitoba) Kaitlyn Lawes 🔨	1	0	1	0	3	2	X	X	7

==== Draw 11 ====
Thursday, January 12, 4:00 pm

Sheet A	1	2	3	4	5	6	7	8	Final
(Japan) Satsuki Fujisawa 🔨	1	1	0	1	1	0	1	0	5
(Manitoba) Kerri Einarson	0	0	1	0	0	2	0	1	4

Sheet B	1	2	3	4	5	6	7	8	Final
(Switzerland) Raphaela Keiser 🔨	2	0	3	1	4	X	X	X	10
(Ontario) Isabelle Ladouceur	0	2	0	0	0	X	X	X	2

Sheet C	1	2	3	4	5	6	7	8	Final
(Sweden) Anna Hasselborg	0	1	0	0	1	0	0	X	2
(Sweden) Isabella Wranå 🔨	2	0	1	0	0	0	1	X	4

Sheet D	1	2	3	4	5	6	7	8	9	Final
(Alberta) Casey Scheidegger	1	0	1	0	0	2	0	1	0	5
(Italy) Stefania Constantini 🔨	0	1	0	2	1	0	1	0	1	6

==== Draw 13 ====
Friday, January 13, 8:30 am

Sheet A	1	2	3	4	5	6	7	8	Final
(Italy) Stefania Constantini	0	0	1	0	1	1	0	3	6
(United States) Tabitha Peterson 🔨	0	2	0	2	0	0	1	0	5

Sheet D	1	2	3	4	5	6	7	8	Final
(Switzerland) Raphaela Keiser 🔨	1	0	0	0	0	1	0	2	4
(Switzerland) Silvana Tirinzoni	0	0	0	2	0	0	1	0	3

==== Draw 15 ====
Friday, January 13, 4:30 pm

Sheet A	1	2	3	4	5	6	7	8	Final
(Manitoba) Jennifer Jones 🔨	2	0	3	0	1	0	2	X	8
(Switzerland) Michèle Jäggi	0	1	0	2	0	1	0	X	4

Sheet B	1	2	3	4	5	6	7	8	Final
(South Korea) Gim Eun-ji 🔨	0	1	2	1	0	2	0	X	6
(Manitoba) Kaitlyn Lawes	1	0	0	0	1	0	1	X	3

Sheet C	1	2	3	4	5	6	7	8	Final
(Ontario) Team Homan 🔨	1	1	0	2	0	0	0	1	5
(Manitoba) Kerri Einarson	0	0	2	0	0	1	0	0	3

Sheet D	1	2	3	4	5	6	7	8	Final
(Manitoba) Team Ackland	1	3	0	2	0	1	0	1	8
(Sweden) Anna Hasselborg 🔨	0	0	4	0	1	0	1	0	6

==== Draw 17 ====
Saturday, January 14, 8:30 am

Sheet B	1	2	3	4	5	6	7	8	Final
(Switzerland) Raphaela Keiser	0	2	0	0	2	0	X	X	4
(Manitoba) Kerri Einarson 🔨	3	0	2	3	0	5	X	X	13

Sheet C	1	2	3	4	5	6	7	8	Final
(Italy) Stefania Constantini 🔨	2	0	0	1	0	0	0	X	3
(Sweden) Anna Hasselborg	0	2	1	0	1	1	1	X	6

Sheet D	1	2	3	4	5	6	7	8	Final
(Manitoba) Jennifer Jones 🔨	2	2	0	2	2	X	X	X	8
(Manitoba) Kaitlyn Lawes	0	0	1	0	0	X	X	X	1

=== Playoffs ===
Quarterfinals
A2	(Japan) Satsuki Fujisawa	8
C1	(Sweden) Anna Hasselborg	7
B3	(South Korea) Gim Eun-ji	6
B2	(Manitoba) Team Ackland	5
A1	(Sweden) Isabella Wranå	4
C3	(Manitoba) Jennifer Jones	3
B1	(Ontario) Team Homan	2
C2	(Manitoba) Kerri Einarson	7

Semifinals
A2	(Japan) Satsuki Fujisawa	7
B3	(South Korea) Gim Eun-ji	6
A1	(Sweden) Isabella Wranå	2
C2	(Manitoba) Kerri Einarson	8

Final
A2	(Japan) Satsuki Fujisawa	5
C2	(Manitoba) Kerri Einarson	3

==== Quarterfinals ====
Saturday, January 14, 4:00 pm

Sheet A	1	2	3	4	5	6	7	8	Final
(Ontario) Team Homan 🔨	1	0	0	0	0	1	0	X	2
(Manitoba) Kerri Einarson	0	0	3	0	2	0	2	X	7

Player percentages
(Ontario) Team Homan		(Manitoba) Team Einarson	
Sarah Wilkes	86%	Briane Harris	96%
Emma Miskew	82%	Shannon Birchard	91%
Tracy Fleury	82%	Val Sweeting	93%
Rachel Homan	79%	Kerri Einarson	93%
Total	82%	Total	93%

Sheet B	1	2	3	4	5	6	7	8	Final
(Sweden) Isabella Wranå 🔨	0	1	0	0	1	0	1	1	4
(Manitoba) Jennifer Jones	0	0	3	0	0	0	0	0	3

Player percentages
(Sweden) Team Wranå		(Manitoba) Team Jones	
Linda Stenlund	80%	Lauren Lenentine	98%
Maria Larsson	86%	Mackenzie Zacharias	88%
Almida de Val	83%	Karlee Burgess	92%
Isabella Wranå	80%	Jennifer Jones	69%
Total	82%	Total	87%

Sheet C	1	2	3	4	5	6	7	8	Final
(South Korea) Gim Eun-ji 🔨	2	0	0	0	3	1	0	0	6
(Manitoba) Team Ackland	0	1	1	1	0	0	1	1	5

Player percentages
(South Korea) Team Gim		(Manitoba) Team Ackland	
Seol Ye-eun	100%	Mackenzie Elias	92%
Kim Su-ji	88%	Sara Oliver	81%
Kim Min-ji	78%	Abby Ackland	81%
Gim Eun-ji	84%	Meghan Walter	83%
Total	88%	Total	84%

Sheet D	1	2	3	4	5	6	7	8	Final
(Japan) Satsuki Fujisawa 🔨	4	0	0	2	0	2	0	0	8
(Sweden) Anna Hasselborg	0	2	0	0	2	0	2	1	7

Player percentages
(Japan) Team Fujisawa		(Sweden) Team Hasselborg	
Yurika Yoshida	97%	Sofia Mabergs	90%
Yumi Suzuki	86%	Agnes Knochenhauer	83%
Chinami Yoshida	88%	–	
Satsuki Fujisawa	83%	Anna Hasselborg	81%
Total	88%	Total	85%

==== Semifinals ====
Saturday, January 14, 8:00 pm

Sheet A	1	2	3	4	5	6	7	8	Final
(Japan) Satsuki Fujisawa 🔨	2	0	2	0	1	0	2	0	7
(South Korea) Gim Eun-ji	0	1	0	1	0	2	0	2	6

Player percentages
(Japan) Team Fujisawa		(South Korea) Team Gim	
Yurika Yoshida	92%	Seol Ye-eun	94%
Yumi Suzuki	84%	Kim Su-ji	73%
Chinami Yoshida	86%	Kim Min-ji	92%
Satsuki Fujisawa	89%	Gim Eun-ji	89%
Total	88%	Total	87%

Sheet D	1	2	3	4	5	6	7	8	Final
(Sweden) Isabella Wranå 🔨	0	0	1	0	1	0	0	X	2
(Manitoba) Kerri Einarson	1	0	0	1	0	2	4	X	8

Player percentages
(Sweden) Team Wranå		(Manitoba) Team Einarson	
Linda Stenlund	93%	Briane Harris	93%
Maria Larsson	84%	Shannon Birchard	88%
Almida de Val	79%	Val Sweeting	91%
Isabella Wranå	70%	Kerri Einarson	96%
Total	81%	Total	92%

==== Final ====
Sunday, January 15, 3:00 pm

Sheet C	1	2	3	4	5	6	7	8	Final
(Japan) Satsuki Fujisawa 🔨	2	1	0	0	1	0	1	X	5
(Manitoba) Kerri Einarson	0	0	0	1	0	2	0	X	3

Player percentages
(Japan) Team Fujisawa		(Manitoba) Team Einarson	
Yurika Yoshida	100%	Briane Harris	92%
Yumi Suzuki	89%	Shannon Birchard	80%
Chinami Yoshida	86%	Val Sweeting	86%
Satsuki Fujisawa	91%	Kerri Einarson	78%
Total	91%	Total	84%
