= Ross Whyte =

Scottish curler (born 1998)

- Curler
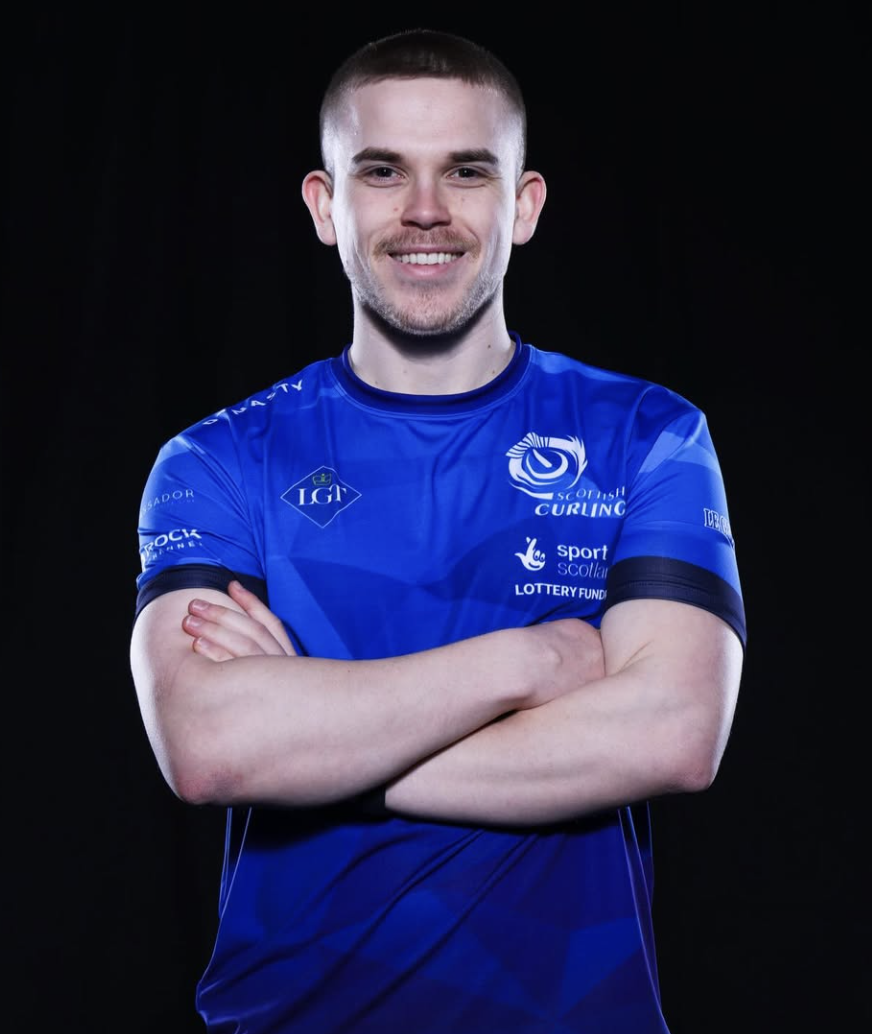
- Born: 31 August 1998 (age 28); York, North Yorkshire, England

Team
- Curling club: Crocketford CC, Dumfries, SCO
- Skip: Grant Hardie
- Fourth: Ross Whyte
- Second: Craig Waddell
- Lead: Euan Kyle

Curling career
- Member Association: Scotland; Great Britain
- World Championship: 3 (2019, 2021, 2026)
- World Mixed Championship: 1 (2018)
- European Championship: 3 (2018, 2021, 2026)
- Olympic: 1 (2022)
- Grand Slam victories: 2 (2025 Masters, 2026 Players')
Medal record
Men's curling
Representing Great Britain
Olympic Games
Silver medal – second place	2022 Beijing	Team
Youth Olympic Games
Silver medal – second place	2016 Lillehammer	Mixed doubles
Winter Universiade
Bronze medal – third place	2019 Krasnoyarsk
Representing Scotland
World Championships
Silver medal – second place	2021 Calgary
Bronze medal – third place	2026 Ogden
European Championships
Gold medal – first place	2018 Tallinn
Gold medal – first place	2021 Lillehammer
Gold medal – first place	2026 Ostrava
World Junior Championships
Silver medal – second place	2018 Aberdeen
Bronze medal – third place	2019 Liverpool
Scottish Men's Championship
Gold medal – first place	2024 Dumfries
Gold medal – first place	2025 Dumfries
Gold medal – first place	2026 Dumfries
Silver medal – second place	2022 Dumfries
Bronze medal – third place	2018 Perth
Bronze medal – third place	2023 Dumfries
Scottish Mixed Doubles Championship
Bronze medal – third place	2016 Glasgow

Ross Whyte (born 31 August 1998 in York, England) is a Scottish curler from Stirling. Skipping his own team, Whyte has won bronze at the 2026 World Men's Curling Championship, silver at the 2018 World Junior Curling Championships and won bronze at the 2019 World Junior Curling Championships and 2019 Winter Universiade. As alternate for the Bruce Mouat rink, he won two European championship titles (2018, 2021) and earned a silver medal in the men's team event of the 2022 Winter Olympics.

== Career ==
=== 2016–2019 ===
In 2016, Whyte was selected to represent Great Britain at the 2016 Winter Youth Olympics in Lillehammer, Norway. There, he led his team of Amy Bryce, Callum Kinnear and Mili Smith to a 6–1 record through the mixed team round robin, earning a spot in the playoffs. The team then lost in the quarterfinals to Russia, eliminating them from contention. Whyte then teamed up with Chinese curler Han Yu for the mixed doubles event. The pair had a strong showing, reaching the final where they lost to Yako Matsuzawa and Philipp Hösli, earning the silver medal. Also during the 2015–16 season, Whyte and his team finished third at the Scottish Junior Curling Championships.

At the 2017 Scottish junior championship, the Whyte rink had another strong showing, finishing 6–1 through the round robin and earning a playoff spot. They then lost both the 1 vs. 2 game and the final to the Cameron Bryce rink, finishing second. After the event, Whyte was invited to join Team Bryce at the 2017 World Junior Curling Championships. There, the team finished third through the preliminary stage with a 6–3 record, qualifying for the final four. After stealing the win against Norway in the 3 vs. 4 game, they lost both the semifinal and bronze medal game to South Korea and the Norwegian team respectively, placing fourth.

During the 2017–18 season, Whyte competed on the men's tour as third for Cameron Bryce while also skipping his own junior rink. With Bryce, he won his first World Curling Tour event at the Tallinn Challenger, going undefeated to claim the title. The team also made the final at The Dumfries Open and earned the bronze medal at the 2018 Scottish Men's Championship. With his junior team, Whyte posted an undefeated record to claim the Scottish junior championship, qualifying for the 2018 World Junior Curling Championships. There, he and his team of Robin Brydone, Fraser Kingan, Euan Kyle and Duncan McFadzean topped the round robin with an unblemished 9–0 record. They then defeated Switzerland in the semifinal to qualify for the world junior final. Tied in an extra end, the Scottish rink lost 6–5 to Canada's Tyler Tardi.

In his final year of juniors, Whyte claimed a second Scottish junior title, once again going undefeated through the Scottish championship. With new players James Craik and Ryan McCormack, along with McFadzean and Kyle, the Scottish team once again went through the round robin unbeaten at the 2019 World Junior Curling Championships. They suffered their first loss in the semifinals following a narrow 10–9 game against Switzerland but rebounded to defeat Norway in the bronze medal game. The following month, Whyte skipped the British team at the 2019 Winter Universiade. There, the team again finished atop the round robin, earning a bye to the semifinals. They then lost to Norway before claiming the bronze medal 10–5 over Switzerland. Along with his junior successes during the 2018–19 season, Whyte served as the alternate for the Bruce Mouat rink at both the 2018 European Curling Championships and the 2019 World Men's Curling Championship, his first appearance at both events. At the Europeans, the team finished with a 7–2 round robin record before defeating Italy's Joël Retornaz and Sweden's Niklas Edin in the playoff round to claim the gold medal. At the World Championship, they finished 8–4 through the preliminary stage before losing to Canada's Kevin Koe in the first playoff round.

=== 2019–present ===
Out of juniors, Whyte and his squad of Robin Brydone, Duncan McFadzean and Euan Kyle began competing full-time on the men's tour. In their first season, the team claimed two tour titles at the Prague Classic and the Dumfries Challenger Series. They also reached the final of the Grant Prix Bern Inter Curling Challenge and were semifinalists at five other tour stops. Their success on tour was not replicated at the Scottish championship, however, as they finished 4–3 and failed to advance to the playoffs. Despite this, the team ranked seventeenth in the world at the end of the season after starting in fifty-fifth. For much of the 2020–21 season, there was no tour due to the COVID-19 pandemic. In the four domestic challenges Team Whyte played in, they lost in the final of all four to Team Mouat. A "curling bubble" was set up in Calgary, Canada, in the Spring, which hosted several events, including the 2021 World Men's Curling Championship. Team Mouat represented Scotland at the world championship with Whyte once again serving as their alternate. The team finished with a 9–4 round robin record, securing a berth in the knockout round. In the playoffs, they beat Canada, and RCF (Russia), making it to the final, where they lost to Sweden, skipped by Niklas Edin.

Team Whyte had a strong start to the 2021–22 season, reaching the final of the 2021 Euro Super Series where they lost to Yannick Schwaller. After a quarterfinal finish in their second event, they won the KW Fall Classic with an unbeaten record, defeating fellow Scotts Team Ross Paterson in the final. They also made the final of their next event, the ATB Okotoks Classic, where they lost to Kevin Koe. With the points they accumulated from the first part of the season, Team Whyte qualified for the 2021 Masters, their first Grand Slam of Curling event. Through the triple knockout, the team qualified through the C side to enter the playoffs before losing to the Mouat rink in the quarterfinals. They also played in the next Grand Slam, the 2021 National, again qualifying for the playoffs through the C event. They then lost to Brad Gushue in the quarters. Next for Whyte was the 2021 European Curling Championships where he was again Mouat's alternate. There, the team was dominant, winning all eleven of their games en route to another gold medal, Whyte's second at the event. As alternate for Team Mouat, Whyte was named to the 2022 British Olympic team. At the Olympics, the British rink finished in first place through the round robin with a strong 8–1 record. In the playoffs, they beat the defending champion John Shuster rink from the United States before losing the gold medal to Sweden, skipped by Niklas Edin. As the Olympic Games conflicted with the 2022 Scottish Men's Curling Championship, Whyte's team began the event playing with coach Greg Drummond for the first five games before Whyte joined them for their sixth game. Through the round robin, the team posted an 8–2 record, securing first place. They then defeated Team Paterson in the 1 vs. 2 game before losing to them in a rematch in the final. They ended their season with a semifinal finish at the Aberdeen International Curling Championship and a 2–3 record at the 2022 Players' Championship. Whyte joined Team Mouat one final time at the season ending 2022 Champions Cup Slam, replacing third Grant Hardie. The team finished with a 1–4 record, failing to advance.

After having their most successful season to date, Team Whyte had mixed results throughout the 2022–23 season. At the first two Slams, the 2022 National and the 2022 Tour Challenge, the team was unsuccessful in qualifying, finishing 1–3 at both events. They turned things around in November, however, winning the Swiss Cup Basel and the Original 16 Tour Bonspiel in back-to-back weeks. In the finals, they defeated Magnus Ramsfjell and Aaron Sluchinski respectively. At the 2022 Masters, the team finished 3–1, earning a playoff spot. They were then defeated by Team Mouat in the quarterfinals. The following month, they missed the playoffs again at the 2023 Canadian Open. Back in Scotland, the team had a strong start to the Scottish championship, sitting 6–0 with one round robin game left to play. They then lost both their final round robin game and 1 vs. 2 game to Team Mouat and the semifinal to James Craik, finishing third. They rebounded at their next tour stop by going undefeated to claim the Aberdeen International Curling Championship. This included a semifinal victory over Team Mouat and a championship win over Italy's Joël Retornaz. They ended their season at the 2023 Players' Championship and 2023 Champions Cup Slam events, losing out in the tiebreaker and quarterfinals respectively. During the season, third Robin Brydone would often skip the team while Whyte threw last rocks due to Brydone suffering from a back injury, preventing him from sweeping.

The Whyte rink came out of the gate strong to begin the 2023–24 season, reaching the semifinals of the 2023 Baden Masters before losing consecutive finals at the 2023 Euro Super Series and the 2023 Stu Sells Oakville Tankard to Team Mouat. In their fourth event, they succeeded in capturing the 2023 AMJ Campbell Shorty Jenkins Classic, defeating Niklas Edin in the championship game. In Grand Slam play, the team had their best season to date, beginning at the 2023 Tour Challenge where they reached the semifinals. They also qualified at the 2023 National before a quarterfinal loss to Brendan Bottcher. At the 2023 Masters, the team finished with a 2–2 record which was just enough to qualify for a tiebreaker. They then defeated Team Edin to qualify before upsetting Brad Gushue and Yannick Schwaller in the quarterfinals and semifinals to reach their first Slam final. There, they fell 3–2 to Joël Retornaz. In their next two events, the team lost in the final and semifinals of the 2024 Mercure Perth Masters and 2024 Canadian Open respectively, both to the Mouat rink. Next for Team Whyte was the 2024 Scottish championship where they dominated the competition, going undefeated through the entire event. In the final, they beat James Craik 7–6 to claim their first Scottish men's title. Despite this, Team Mouat was still chosen to represent Scotland at the 2024 World Men's Curling Championship. To wrap up their season, the team had a quarterfinal finish at the 2024 Players' Championship.

The Whyte team continued this momentum from the previous season during the 2024-25 curling season, winning their first Grand Slam of Curling event at the 2025 Masters, beating Brad Jacobs in the final. They then defended their Scottish men's title in 2025, beating the current top ranked team in the world, Team Mouat, 8–3 in the final. Despite their strong results on the Grand Slam circuit and defending their men's national championship title, Team Mouat was later chosen by British Curling again to represent Scotland at the 2025 World Men's Curling Championship, who were number one in the world rankings. Team Whyte would finish the 2024-25 season at the 2025 Players' Championship, finishing 2–3.

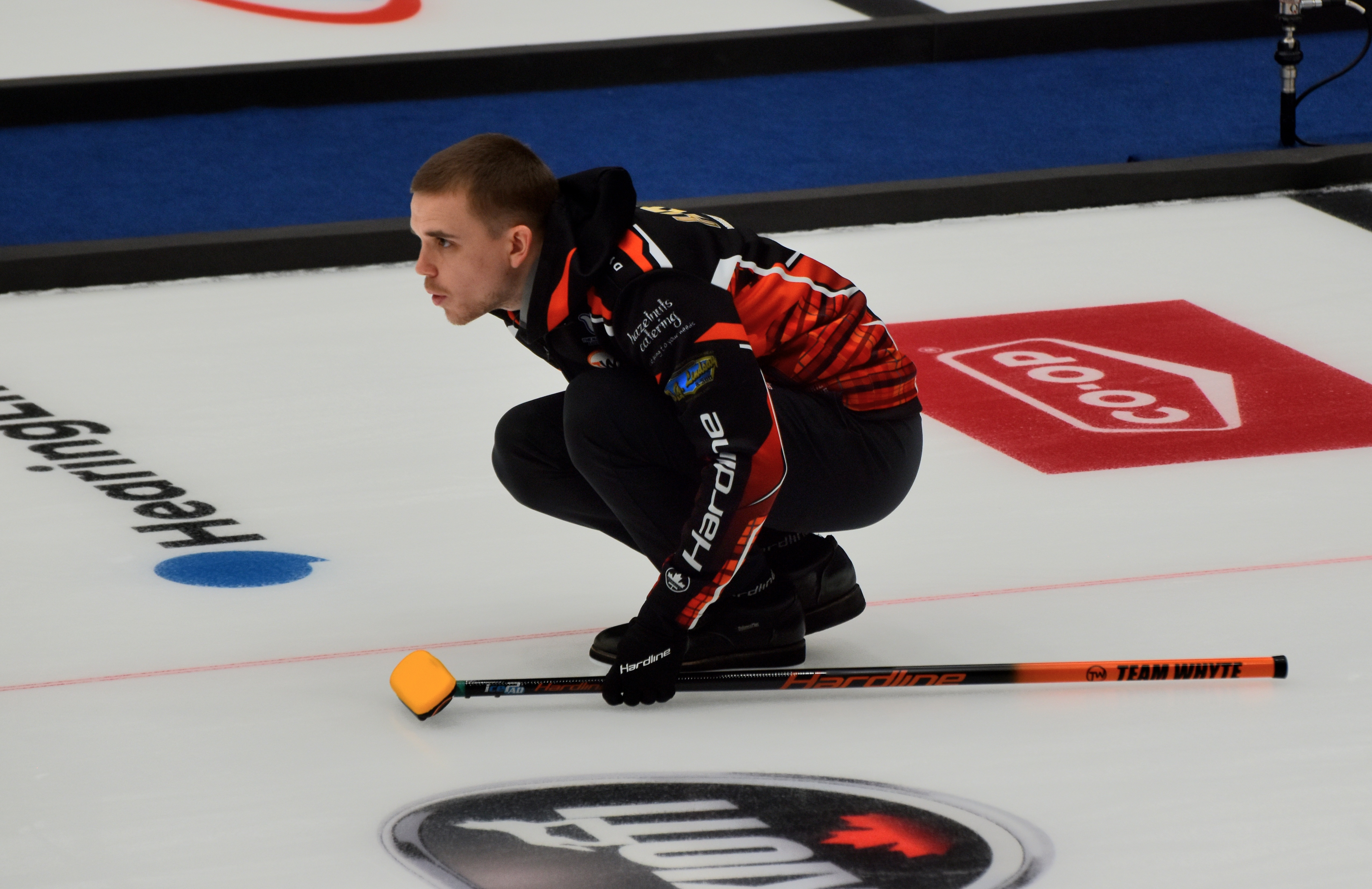
Whyte at the 2026 Players' Championship.

=== Mixed doubles ===
Whyte began playing mixed doubles with partner Sophie Jackson in 2015. The pair made their debut at the 2015 Scottish Mixed Doubles Curling Championship where after a 4–3 round robin record, they lost in a tiebreaker to Hailey and John Duff. They returned the following year with a stronger showing, posting a 6–1 record to qualify for the semifinals. There, they fell 9–5 to Judith and Lee McCleary, earning the bronze medal. They failed to qualify again in 2017 after a 1–3 round robin record. Whyte and Jackson disbanded following the event.

After a five-year hiatus, Whyte returned to the Scottish mixed doubles championship in 2022 with new partner Sophie Sinclair. This pair qualified for the playoffs with an undefeated record before losing in the quarterfinals to Katie McMillan and Mark Watt. Jackson and Whyte again qualified the following year, however, lost in the quarterfinals to eventual champions Jennifer Dodds and Bruce Mouat. The following year, they again made the quarterfinals where they were defeated by the eventual winners, Whyte's teammate Duncan McFadzean and his former mixed doubles partner Sophie Jackson.

=== Mixed ===
In 2018, Whyte played second on the Robin Brydone rink that won the 2018 Scottish Mixed Curling Championship. This qualified the squad, including third Rebecca Morrison and lead Leeanne McKenzie for the 2018 World Mixed Curling Championship. There, the Scottish team topped the round robin with an 8–0 record to earn a direct bye to the quarterfinals. They then lost to Canada's Mike Anderson, who went on to win the event.

== Personal life ==
Whyte is currently studying Sports Studies at the University of Stirling. He played golf for the South of Scotland U18 team.

== Grand Slam record ==
Key
C	Champion
F	Lost in Final
SF	Lost in Semifinal
QF	Lost in Quarterfinals
R16	Lost in the round of 16
Q	Did not advance to playoffs
T2	Played in Tier 2 event
DNP	Did not participate in event
N/A	Not a Grand Slam event that season

Event	2021–22	2022–23	2023–24	2024–25	2025–26	2026–27
Invitational	N/A	Q	SF	QF	Q	QF
Masters	QF	QF	F	C	F	QF
National	QF	Q	QF	SF	QF	QF
Open	N/A	Q	SF	QF	F	
Players'	Q	Q	QF	Q	C	
Champions Cup	Q (Note: Whyte spared for Grant Hardie on Team Bruce Mouat.)	QF	N/A	N/A	N/A	N/A

== Teams ==
Season	Skip	Third	Second	Lead	Alternate
2013–14	Ross Whyte	Bobby Lammie	Neil Topping	Euan Kyle	
2014–15	Ross Whyte	James Baird	Gavin Barr	Euan Kyle	
2015–16	Ross Whyte	James Baird	Gavin Barr	Euan Kyle	David Baird
2016–17	Ross Whyte	Callum Kinnear	Ryan McCormack	Duncan McFadzean	
2017–18	Cameron Bryce	Ross Whyte	Robin Brydone	Euan Kyle	Angus Dowell
2017–18	Ross Whyte	Robin Brydone	Fraser Kingan	Euan Kyle	Duncan McFadzean (WJCC)
2018–19	Ross Whyte	Duncan McFadzean	James Craik	Euan Kyle	Ryan McCormack (WJCC)
2019–20	Ross Whyte	Robin Brydone	Duncan McFadzean	Euan Kyle	
2020–21	Ross Whyte	Robin Brydone	Duncan McFadzean	Euan Kyle	
2021–22	Ross Whyte	Robin Brydone	Duncan McFadzean	Euan Kyle	Greg Drummond (SMCC)
2022–23	Ross Whyte (Fourth)	Robin Brydone (Skip)	Duncan McFadzean	Euan Kyle	
2023–24	Ross Whyte	Robin Brydone	Duncan McFadzean	Euan Kyle	
2024–25	Ross Whyte	Robin Brydone	Duncan McFadzean	Euan Kyle	
2025–26	Ross Whyte	Robin Brydone	Craig Waddell	Euan Kyle	Duncan McFadzean
2026–27	Ross Whyte (Fourth)	Grant Hardie (Skip)	Craig Waddell	Euan Kyle	
