= 2022 Masters (curling) =

Grand Slam of Curling event

2022 WFG Masters
- Host city: Oakville, Ontario
- Arena: Sixteen Mile Sports Complex
- Dates: December 6–11
- Men's winner: (Italy) Team Retornaz
- Curling club: Trentino Curling, Cembra
- Skip: Joël Retornaz
- Third: Amos Mosaner
- Second: Sebastiano Arman
- Lead: Mattia Giovanella
- Finalist: (Scotland) Bruce Mouat
- Women's winner: (Manitoba) Team Einarson
- Curling club: Gimli CC, Gimli
- Skip: Kerri Einarson
- Third: Val Sweeting
- Second: Shannon Birchard
- Lead: Briane Harris
- Coach: Reid Carruthers
- Finalist: (Ontario) Tracy Fleury

The 2022 WFG Masters was held from December 6 to 11 at the Sixteen Mile Sports Complex in Oakville, Ontario. It was the third Grand Slam event and second major of the 2022–23 curling season.

== Qualification ==
The top 16 ranked men's and women's teams on the World Curling Federation's world team rankings as of November 7, 2022 qualified for the event. In the event that a team declines their invitation, the next-ranked team on the world team ranking is invited until the field is complete.

=== Men ===
Top world team ranking men's teams:

1. (Newfoundland and Labrador) Brad Gushue
2. (Sweden) Niklas Edin
3. (Alberta) Brendan Bottcher
4. (Scotland) Bruce Mouat
5. (Manitoba) Matt Dunstone
6. (Alberta) Kevin Koe
7. (Italy) Joël Retornaz
8. (Manitoba) Reid Carruthers
9. (Switzerland) Yannick Schwaller
10. (Scotland) Ross Whyte
11. (Saskatchewan) Colton Flasch
12. (United States) Korey Dropkin
13. (Norway) ~~Steffen Walstad~~
14. (Norway) Magnus Ramsfjell
15. (Switzerland) Michael Brunner
16. (Switzerland) Marco Hösli
17. (Ontario) John Epping

=== Women ===
Top world team ranking women's teams:

1. (Manitoba) Kerri Einarson
2. (Sweden) Anna Hasselborg
3. (Switzerland) Silvana Tirinzoni
4. (Japan) Satsuki Fujisawa
5. (Manitoba) Kaitlyn Lawes
6. (Ontario) Tracy Fleury
7. (South Korea) Gim Eun-ji
8. (Manitoba) Jennifer Jones
9. (South Korea) Kim Eun-jung
10. (Sweden) Isabella Wranå
11. (Alberta) Casey Scheidegger
12. (Switzerland) Raphaela Keiser
13. (British Columbia) Clancy Grandy
14. (Manitoba) Chelsea Carey
15. (Switzerland) Michèle Jäggi
16. (United States) Tabitha Peterson

== Men ==
=== Teams ===
The teams are listed as follows:

Skip	Third	Second	Lead	Alternate	Locale
Brendan Bottcher	Marc Kennedy	Brett Gallant	Ben Hebert		Calgary, Alberta
Michael Brunner	Romano Meier	Anthony Petoud	Marcel Käufeler		Bern, Switzerland
Reid Carruthers	Jason Gunnlaugson	Derek Samagalski	Connor Njegovan		Winnipeg, Manitoba
Korey Dropkin	Andrew Stopera	Mark Fenner	Thomas Howell		(United States) Duluth, Minnesota
Matt Dunstone	B. J. Neufeld	Colton Lott	Ryan Harnden		Winnipeg, Manitoba
Oskar Eriksson	Rasmus Wranå	Daniel Magnusson (Note: Daniel Magnusson spared for Niklas Edin. He played second, while second Rasmus Wranå played third and third Oskar Eriksson moved up to skip.)	Christoffer Sundgren		Karlstad, Sweden
John Epping	Mat Camm	Pat Janssen	Scott Chadwick		Toronto, Ontario
Colton Flasch	Catlin Schneider	Kevin Marsh	Dan Marsh		Saskatoon, Saskatchewan
Brad Gushue	Mark Nichols	E. J. Harnden	Geoff Walker		St. John's, Newfoundland and Labrador
Philipp Hösli (Fourth)	Marco Hefti	Marco Hösli (Skip)	Justin Hausherr	Martin Rios	Glarus, Switzerland
Kevin Koe	Tyler Tardi	Brad Thiessen	Karrick Martin		Calgary, Alberta
Bruce Mouat	Grant Hardie	Bobby Lammie	Hammy McMillan Jr.		Stirling, Scotland
Magnus Ramsfjell	Martin Sesaker	Bendik Ramsfjell	Gaute Nepstad		Trondheim, Norway
Joël Retornaz	Amos Mosaner	Sebastiano Arman	Mattia Giovanella		Trentino, Italy
Benoît Schwarz (Fourth)	Yannick Schwaller (Skip)	Sven Michel	Pablo Lachat		Geneva, Switzerland
Ross Whyte	Robin Brydone	Duncan McFadzean	Euan Kyle		Stirling, Scotland

=== Round-robin standings ===
Final round-robin standings

Key
Teams to Playoffs
Teams to Tiebreaker

Pool A	W	L	PF	PA
(Newfoundland and Labrador) Brad Gushue	2	2	21	16
(Manitoba) Matt Dunstone	2	2	19	21
(United States) Korey Dropkin	1	3	10	26
(Ontario) John Epping	1	3	15	23

Pool D	W	L	PF	PA
(Switzerland) Yannick Schwaller	3	1	24	17
(Scotland) Bruce Mouat	3	1	25	13
(Norway) Magnus Ramsfjell	3	1	22	14
(Manitoba) Reid Carruthers	1	3	15	21

Pool B	W	L	PF	PA
(Sweden) Team Edin	3	1	23	15
(Alberta) Kevin Koe	1	3	17	30
(Saskatchewan) Colton Flasch	1	3	19	27
(Switzerland) Marco Hösli	0	4	19	29

Pool C	W	L	PF	PA
(Alberta) Brendan Bottcher	4	0	27	17
(Scotland) Ross Whyte	3	1	30	21
(Italy) Joël Retornaz	3	1	28	17
(Switzerland) Michael Brunner	1	3	16	23

=== Round-robin results ===
All draw times are listed in Eastern Time (UTC−04:00).

==== Draw 2 ====
Tuesday, December 6, 11:30 am

Sheet A	1	2	3	4	5	6	7	8	Final
(Norway) Magnus Ramsfjell 🔨	0	0	3	0	0	1	0	1	5
(Manitoba) Matt Dunstone	1	0	0	1	1	0	1	0	4

Sheet B	1	2	3	4	5	6	7	8	Final
(Manitoba) Reid Carruthers	0	0	0	0	2	1	0	X	3
(Ontario) John Epping 🔨	0	2	1	3	0	0	1	X	7

Sheet C	1	2	3	4	5	6	7	8	Final
(Switzerland) Yannick Schwaller	0	2	0	2	0	0	1	X	5
(Newfoundland and Labrador) Brad Gushue 🔨	1	0	1	0	1	0	0	X	3

Sheet D	1	2	3	4	5	6	7	8	Final
(United States) Korey Dropkin	0	0	1	0	0	1	0	X	2
(Scotland) Bruce Mouat 🔨	0	2	0	1	1	0	4	X	8

==== Draw 4 ====
Tuesday, December 6, 6:30 pm

Sheet A	1	2	3	4	5	6	7	8	Final
(Switzerland) Michael Brunner 🔨	0	0	1	0	0	0	X	X	1
(Sweden) Team Edin	0	1	0	2	2	2	X	X	7

Sheet B	1	2	3	4	5	6	7	8	Final
(Italy) Joël Retornaz	1	0	0	0	4	1	1	X	7
(Saskatchewan) Colton Flasch 🔨	0	1	0	1	0	0	0	X	2

Sheet C	1	2	3	4	5	6	7	8	Final
(Scotland) Ross Whyte 🔨	0	2	0	1	0	2	2	X	7
(Alberta) Kevin Koe	0	0	2	0	1	0	0	X	3

Sheet D	1	2	3	4	5	6	7	8	9	Final
(Alberta) Brendan Bottcher 🔨	2	0	1	0	0	1	1	0	1	6
(Switzerland) Marco Hösli	0	1	0	1	0	0	0	3	0	5

==== Draw 5 ====
Wednesday, December 7, 8:00 am

Sheet A	1	2	3	4	5	6	7	8	Final
(Manitoba) Reid Carruthers	0	1	0	1	0	X	X	X	2
(Newfoundland and Labrador) Brad Gushue 🔨	2	0	2	0	4	X	X	X	8

Sheet B	1	2	3	4	5	6	7	8	Final
(Norway) Magnus Ramsfjell 🔨	0	2	0	0	4	1	X	X	7
(United States) Korey Dropkin	0	0	1	0	0	0	X	X	1

Sheet C	1	2	3	4	5	6	7	8	Final
(Manitoba) Matt Dunstone 🔨	1	1	1	0	1	0	3	X	7
(Scotland) Bruce Mouat	0	0	0	2	0	2	0	X	4

Sheet D	1	2	3	4	5	6	7	8	Final
(Switzerland) Yannick Schwaller	1	2	1	0	1	0	0	1	6
(Ontario) John Epping 🔨	0	0	0	1	0	3	1	0	5

==== Draw 7 ====
Wednesday, December 7, 3:30 pm

Sheet A	1	2	3	4	5	6	7	8	Final
(Alberta) Brendan Bottcher	1	0	2	0	2	0	2	2	9
(Alberta) Kevin Koe 🔨	0	1	0	1	0	2	0	0	4

Sheet B	1	2	3	4	5	6	7	8	Final
(Scotland) Ross Whyte 🔨	4	0	2	0	2	0	2	X	10
(Switzerland) Marco Hösli	0	2	0	2	0	1	0	X	5

Sheet C	1	2	3	4	5	6	7	8	Final
(Italy) Joël Retornaz 🔨	1	0	0	0	2	0	2	0	5
(Sweden) Team Edin	0	2	0	0	0	2	0	2	6

Sheet D	1	2	3	4	5	6	7	8	Final
(Switzerland) Michael Brunner 🔨	1	0	1	0	0	1	1	0	4
(Saskatchewan) Colton Flasch	0	2	0	1	2	0	0	1	6

==== Draw 9 ====
Thursday, December 8, 8:00 am

Sheet A	1	2	3	4	5	6	7	8	Final
(Italy) Joël Retornaz 🔨	3	0	0	2	0	2	0	0	7
(Switzerland) Marco Hösli	0	3	1	0	0	0	1	1	6

Sheet B	1	2	3	4	5	6	7	8	Final
(Switzerland) Michael Brunner	0	3	0	0	1	0	1	X	5
(Alberta) Kevin Koe 🔨	2	0	2	1	0	2	0	X	7

Sheet C	1	2	3	4	5	6	7	8	Final
(Alberta) Brendan Bottcher 🔨	2	1	0	2	0	1	0	1	7
(Saskatchewan) Colton Flasch	0	0	2	0	1	0	1	0	4

Sheet D	1	2	3	4	5	6	7	8	Final
(Scotland) Ross Whyte	1	0	1	1	0	1	0	0	4
(Sweden) Team Edin 🔨	0	0	0	0	2	0	3	1	6

==== Draw 11 ====
Thursday, December 8, 3:30 pm

Sheet A	1	2	3	4	5	6	7	8	Final
(Switzerland) Yannick Schwaller 🔨	0	3	0	3	0	1	1	X	8
(United States) Korey Dropkin	0	0	2	0	1	0	0	X	3

Sheet B	1	2	3	4	5	6	7	8	Final
(Newfoundland and Labrador) Brad Gushue	0	1	0	0	2	0	0	X	3
(Scotland) Bruce Mouat 🔨	1	0	0	3	0	1	0	X	5

Sheet C	1	2	3	4	5	6	7	8	Final
(Norway) Magnus Ramsfjell	0	1	0	4	0	0	1	X	6
(Ontario) John Epping 🔨	0	0	1	0	1	0	0	X	2

Sheet D	1	2	3	4	5	6	7	8	Final
(Manitoba) Matt Dunstone	0	1	0	0	1	0	X	X	2
(Manitoba) Reid Carruthers 🔨	1	0	1	1	0	4	X	X	7

==== Draw 14 ====
Friday, December 9, 11:30 am

Sheet A	1	2	3	4	5	6	7	8	Final
(Scotland) Ross Whyte	0	1	0	2	0	2	0	4	9
(Saskatchewan) Colton Flasch 🔨	2	0	2	0	1	0	2	0	7

Sheet B	1	2	3	4	5	6	7	8	Final
(Sweden) Team Edin 🔨	1	0	0	0	1	0	2	0	4
(Alberta) Brendan Bottcher	0	2	1	1	0	0	0	1	5

Sheet C	1	2	3	4	5	6	7	8	Final
(Switzerland) Michael Brunner 🔨	0	1	1	0	1	0	1	2	6
(Switzerland) Marco Hösli	0	0	0	2	0	1	0	0	3

Sheet D	1	2	3	4	5	6	7	8	Final
(Alberta) Kevin Koe	0	1	0	2	0	X	X	X	3
(Italy) Joël Retornaz 🔨	2	0	4	0	3	X	X	X	9

==== Draw 16 ====
Friday, December 9, 7:30 pm

Sheet A	1	2	3	4	5	6	7	8	Final
(Scotland) Bruce Mouat 🔨	2	0	3	1	2	X	X	X	8
(Ontario) John Epping	0	1	0	0	0	X	X	X	1

Sheet B	1	2	3	4	5	6	7	8	9	Final
(Manitoba) Matt Dunstone	0	0	3	0	0	1	1	0	1	6
(Switzerland) Yannick Schwaller 🔨	0	1	0	0	2	0	0	2	0	5

Sheet C	1	2	3	4	5	6	7	8	Final
(Manitoba) Reid Carruthers 🔨	1	1	0	0	0	0	1	0	3
(United States) Korey Dropkin	0	0	0	2	0	0	0	2	4

Sheet D	1	2	3	4	5	6	7	8	Final
(Newfoundland and Labrador) Brad Gushue 🔨	2	0	2	0	1	1	0	1	7
(Norway) Magnus Ramsfjell	0	1	0	1	0	0	2	0	4

=== Tiebreaker ===
Saturday, December 10, 8:00 am

Sheet C	1	2	3	4	5	6	7	8	Final
(Newfoundland and Labrador) Brad Gushue	2	0	0	2	0	3	X	X	7
(Manitoba) Matt Dunstone 🔨	0	0	0	0	2	0	X	X	2

Player percentages
(Newfoundland and Labrador) Team Gushue		(Manitoba) Team Dunstone	
Geoff Walker	85%	Ryan Harnden	88%
E. J. Harnden	69%	Colton Lott	79%
Mark Nichols	83%	B. J. Neufeld	77%
Brad Gushue	90%	Matt Dunstone	73%
Total	82%	Total	79%

=== Playoffs ===
Quarterfinals
1	(Alberta) Brendan Bottcher	5
8	(Newfoundland and Labrador) Brad Gushue	4
4	(Italy) Joël Retornaz	6
5	(Switzerland) Yannick Schwaller	2
2	(Sweden) Team Edin	3
7	(Norway) Magnus Ramsfjell	7
3	(Scotland) Ross Whyte	3
6	(Scotland) Bruce Mouat	7

Semifinals
1	(Alberta) Brendan Bottcher	1
4	(Italy) Joël Retornaz	3
7	(Norway) Magnus Ramsfjell	1
6	(Scotland) Bruce Mouat	7

Final
4	(Italy) Joël Retornaz	6
6	(Scotland) Bruce Mouat	2

==== Quarterfinals ====
Saturday, December 10, 11:30 am

Sheet A	1	2	3	4	5	6	7	8	9	Final
(Alberta) Brendan Bottcher 🔨	0	0	1	0	2	0	1	0	1	5
(Newfoundland and Labrador) Brad Gushue	0	0	0	1	0	2	0	1	0	4

Player percentages
(Alberta) Team Bottcher		(Newfoundland and Labrador) Team Gushue	
Ben Hebert	95%	Geoff Walker	84%
Brett Gallant	77%	E. J. Harnden	81%
Marc Kennedy	86%	Mark Nichols	70%
Brendan Bottcher	88%	Brad Gushue	93%
Total	86%	Total	82%

Sheet B	1	2	3	4	5	6	7	8	Final
(Sweden) Team Edin	0	1	0	1	0	1	0	X	3
(Norway) Magnus Ramsfjell 🔨	2	0	2	0	2	0	1	X	7

Player percentages
(Sweden) Team Edin		(Norway) Team Ramsfjell	
Christoffer Sundgren	91%	Gaute Nepstad	77%
Daniel Magnusson	77%	Bendik Ramsfjell	77%
Rasmus Wranå	75%	Martin Sesaker	82%
Oskar Eriksson	68%	Magnus Ramsfjell	86%
Total	78%	Total	80%

Sheet C	1	2	3	4	5	6	7	8	Final
(Italy) Joël Retornaz 🔨	1	1	0	3	1	0	X	X	6
(Switzerland) Yannick Schwaller	0	0	1	0	0	1	X	X	2

Player percentages
(Italy) Team Retornaz		(Switzerland) Team Schwaller	
Mattia Giovanella	96%	Pablo Lachat	94%
Sebastiano Arman	98%	Sven Michel	92%
Amos Mosaner	96%	Yannick Schwaller	75%
Joël Retornaz	90%	Benoît Schwarz	67%
Total	95%	Total	82%

Sheet D	1	2	3	4	5	6	7	8	Final
(Scotland) Ross Whyte	0	0	2	0	0	0	1	0	3
(Scotland) Bruce Mouat 🔨	0	2	0	2	1	0	0	2	7

Player percentages
(Scotland) Team Whyte		(Scotland) Team Mouat	
Euan Kyle	95%	Hammy McMillan Jr.	98%
Duncan McFadzean	80%	Bobby Lammie	83%
Robin Brydone	91%	Grant Hardie	91%
Ross Whyte	75%	Bruce Mouat	91%
Total	85%	Total	91%

==== Semifinals ====
Saturday, December 10, 7:30 pm

Sheet C	1	2	3	4	5	6	7	8	Final
(Norway) Magnus Ramsfjell	0	0	0	0	1	0	X	X	1
(Scotland) Bruce Mouat 🔨	0	2	1	1	0	3	X	X	7

Player percentages
(Norway) Team Ramsfjell		(Scotland) Team Mouat	
Gaute Nepstad	94%	Hammy McMillan Jr.	90%
Bendik Ramsfjell	79%	Bobby Lammie	90%
Martin Sesaker	79%	Grant Hardie	85%
Magnus Ramsfjell	69%	Bruce Mouat	98%
Total	80%	Total	91%

Sheet D	1	2	3	4	5	6	7	8	9	Final
(Alberta) Brendan Bottcher 🔨	0	0	0	0	0	0	0	1	0	1
(Italy) Joël Retornaz	0	0	0	0	0	0	1	0	2	3

Player percentages
(Alberta) Team Bottcher		(Italy) Team Retornaz	
Ben Hebert	93%	Mattia Giovanella	92%
Brett Gallant	96%	Sebastiano Arman	82%
Marc Kennedy	89%	Amos Mosaner	96%
Brendan Bottcher	91%	Joël Retornaz	92%
Total	92%	Total	90%

==== Final ====
Sunday, December 11, 5:00 pm

Sheet C	1	2	3	4	5	6	7	8	Final
(Italy) Joël Retornaz 🔨	1	1	1	1	0	1	1	X	6
(Scotland) Bruce Mouat	0	0	0	0	2	0	0	X	2

Player percentages
(Italy) Team Retornaz		(Scotland) Team Mouat	
Mattia Giovanella	75%	Hammy McMillan Jr.	98%
Sebastiano Arman	84%	Bobby Lammie	88%
Amos Mosaner	93%	Grant Hardie	93%
Joël Retornaz	86%	Bruce Mouat	70%
Total	84%	Total	87%

== Women ==
=== Teams ===
The teams are listed as follows:

Skip	Third	Second	Lead	Alternate	Locale
Chelsea Carey	Jamie Sinclair	Laurie St-Georges (Note: Laurie St-Georges spared for Liz Fyfe.)	Rachel Erickson		Winnipeg, Manitoba
Kerri Einarson	Val Sweeting	Shannon Birchard	Briane Harris		Gimli, Manitoba
Satsuki Fujisawa	Chinami Yoshida	Yumi Suzuki	Yurika Yoshida	Kotomi Ishizaki	Kitami, Japan
Gim Eun-ji	Kim Min-ji	Kim Su-ji	Seol Ye-eun	Seol Ye-ji	Uijeongbu, South Korea
Clancy Grandy	Kayla MacMillan	Lindsay Dubue	Sarah Loken		Vancouver, British Columbia
Anna Hasselborg	Agnes Knochenhauer	Sofia Mabergs	Therese Westman (Note: Therese Westman spared for Sara McManus. She played lead while lead Sofia Mabergs played second and alternate Agnes Knochenhauer played third.)		Sundbyberg, Sweden
Rachel Homan (Fourth)	Tracy Fleury (Skip)	Emma Miskew	Sarah Wilkes		Ottawa, Ontario
Michèle Jäggi	Irene Schori	Stefanie Berset	Sarah Müller	Lara Stocker	Bern, Switzerland
Jennifer Jones	Karlee Burgess	Mackenzie Zacharias	Emily Zacharias	Lauren Lenentine	Winnipeg, Manitoba
Selina Witschonke (Fourth)	Elena Mathis	Raphaela Keiser (Skip)	Marina Lörtscher		St. Moritz, Switzerland
Kim Eun-jung	Kim Kyeong-ae	Kim Yeong-mi (Note: Alternate Kim Yeong-mi replaced second Kim Cho-hi.)	Kim Seon-yeong	Kim Cho-hi	Gangneung, South Korea
Selena Njegovan	Laura Walker (Note: Laura Walker spared for Kaitlyn Lawes. She played third while third Selena Njegovan moved up to skip.)	Jocelyn Peterman	Kristin MacCuish		Winnipeg, Manitoba
Tabitha Peterson	Cory Thiesse	Becca Hamilton	Tara Peterson		(United States) Chaska, Minnesota
Kate Hogan	Meghan Walter (Note: Meghan Walter and Mackenzie Elias spared for Casey Scheidegger and Jessie Haughian who stayed home due to a family emergency. Elias played lead while Walter played third, lead Taylor McDonald played second and third Kate Hogan moved up to skip.)	Taylor McDonald	Mackenzie Elias		Lethbridge, Alberta
Alina Pätz (Fourth)	Silvana Tirinzoni (Skip)	Carole Howald	Briar Schwaller-Hürlimann		Aarau, Switzerland
Isabella Wranå	Almida de Val	Linda Stenlund	Maria Larsson		Sundbyberg, Sweden

=== Round-robin standings ===
Final round-robin standings

Key
Teams to Playoffs
Teams to Tiebreakers

Pool A	W	L	PF	PA
(Manitoba) Kerri Einarson	4	0	32	20
(Manitoba) Team Lawes	3	1	29	15
(United States) Tabitha Peterson	3	1	24	16
(Switzerland) Raphaela Keiser	0	4	15	24

Pool D	W	L	PF	PA
(Manitoba) Jennifer Jones	3	1	26	19
(South Korea) Kim Eun-jung	1	3	17	27
(British Columbia) Clancy Grandy	1	3	15	28
(Japan) Satsuki Fujisawa	1	3	17	26

Pool B	W	L	PF	PA
(Ontario) Team Homan	4	0	28	16
(Alberta) Team Scheidegger	2	2	19	22
(Switzerland) Michèle Jäggi	2	2	20	22
(Sweden) Anna Hasselborg	2	2	23	15

Pool C	W	L	PF	PA
(South Korea) Gim Eun-ji	3	1	24	17
(Manitoba) Chelsea Carey	2	2	17	22
(Sweden) Isabella Wranå	1	3	20	24
(Switzerland) Silvana Tirinzoni	0	4	14	27

=== Round-robin results ===
All draw times are listed in Eastern Time (UTC−04:00).

==== Draw 1 ====
Tuesday, December 6, 8:00 am

Sheet A	1	2	3	4	5	6	7	8	Final
(United States) Tabitha Peterson	0	1	0	0	1	0	X	X	2
(Manitoba) Jennifer Jones 🔨	3	0	2	2	0	2	X	X	9

Sheet B	1	2	3	4	5	6	7	8	Final
(British Columbia) Clancy Grandy 🔨	0	2	0	0	1	0	0	X	3
(Manitoba) Team Lawes	0	0	2	1	0	3	2	X	8

Sheet C	1	2	3	4	5	6	7	8	Final
(Japan) Satsuki Fujisawa 🔨	2	1	0	0	3	0	0	1	7
(Switzerland) Raphaela Keiser	0	0	2	0	0	2	0	0	4

Sheet D	1	2	3	4	5	6	7	8	9	Final
(Manitoba) Kerri Einarson 🔨	0	2	0	2	0	2	0	0	2	8
(South Korea) Kim Eun-jung	0	0	2	0	2	0	1	1	0	6

==== Draw 3 ====
Tuesday, December 6, 3:00 pm

Sheet A	1	2	3	4	5	6	7	8	Final
(Alberta) Team Scheidegger	0	1	0	0	2	0	X	X	3
(South Korea) Gim Eun-ji 🔨	2	0	3	2	0	2	X	X	9

Sheet B	1	2	3	4	5	6	7	8	Final
(Sweden) Anna Hasselborg 🔨	1	0	2	0	1	0	0	0	4
(Manitoba) Chelsea Carey	0	2	0	1	0	1	0	1	5

Sheet C	1	2	3	4	5	6	7	8	Final
(Switzerland) Silvana Tirinzoni	0	0	0	2	1	0	2	0	5
(Switzerland) Michèle Jäggi 🔨	0	2	1	0	0	1	0	2	6

Sheet D	1	2	3	4	5	6	7	8	Final
(Ontario) Team Homan 🔨	0	2	0	3	0	3	0	0	8
(Sweden) Isabella Wranå	1	0	2	0	2	0	1	1	7

==== Draw 6 ====
Wednesday, December 7, 11:30 am

Sheet A	1	2	3	4	5	6	7	8	Final
(British Columbia) Clancy Grandy 🔨	0	1	0	0	2	2	0	1	6
(Switzerland) Raphaela Keiser	1	0	1	1	0	0	1	0	4

Sheet B	1	2	3	4	5	6	7	8	Final
(Manitoba) Kerri Einarson 🔨	2	0	3	1	1	0	1	X	8
(Manitoba) Jennifer Jones	0	4	0	0	0	1	0	X	5

Sheet C	1	2	3	4	5	6	7	8	Final
(United States) Tabitha Peterson 🔨	0	2	1	0	0	2	2	X	7
(South Korea) Kim Eun-jung	0	0	0	2	0	0	0	X	2

Sheet D	1	2	3	4	5	6	7	8	Final
(Japan) Satsuki Fujisawa	0	0	1	0	0	1	0	X	2
(Manitoba) Team Lawes 🔨	2	0	0	2	1	0	2	X	7

==== Draw 8 ====
Wednesday, December 7, 7:30 pm

Sheet A	1	2	3	4	5	6	7	8	Final
(Sweden) Anna Hasselborg 🔨	0	0	5	0	1	2	X	X	8
(Switzerland) Silvana Tirinzoni	0	0	0	2	0	0	X	X	2

Sheet B	1	2	3	4	5	6	7	8	Final
(Alberta) Team Scheidegger 🔨	1	0	0	2	0	1	0	0	4
(Sweden) Isabella Wranå	0	0	2	0	2	0	2	1	7

Sheet C	1	2	3	4	5	6	7	8	Final
(Ontario) Team Homan 🔨	0	2	0	0	1	0	3	X	6
(South Korea) Gim Eun-ji	0	0	0	1	0	1	0	X	2

Sheet D	1	2	3	4	5	6	7	8	Final
(Manitoba) Chelsea Carey	0	1	1	1	0	2	0	1	6
(Switzerland) Michèle Jäggi 🔨	3	0	0	0	1	0	1	0	5

==== Draw 10 ====
Thursday, December 8, 11:30 am

Sheet A	1	2	3	4	5	6	7	8	Final
(Sweden) Isabella Wranå 🔨	1	0	1	0	1	0	0	0	3
(Switzerland) Michèle Jäggi	0	1	0	1	0	1	1	1	5

Sheet B	1	2	3	4	5	6	7	8	Final
(Switzerland) Silvana Tirinzoni 🔨	3	0	1	0	1	0	0	X	5
(Ontario) Team Homan	0	3	0	2	0	1	1	X	7

Sheet C	1	2	3	4	5	6	7	8	Final
(Alberta) Team Scheidegger	1	0	1	0	0	1	1	2	6
(Manitoba) Chelsea Carey 🔨	0	1	0	2	1	0	0	0	4

Sheet D	1	2	3	4	5	6	7	8	Final
(Sweden) Anna Hasselborg 🔨	1	0	0	0	2	0	0	1	4
(South Korea) Gim Eun-ji	0	2	0	0	0	1	2	0	5

==== Draw 12 ====
Thursday, December 8, 7:30 pm

Sheet A	1	2	3	4	5	6	7	8	Final
(Manitoba) Team Lawes 🔨	1	1	1	0	1	0	3	2	9
(South Korea) Kim Eun-jung	0	0	0	1	0	2	0	0	3

Sheet B	1	2	3	4	5	6	7	8	Final
(Japan) Satsuki Fujisawa 🔨	0	1	0	0	0	1	0	X	3
(United States) Tabitha Peterson	0	0	2	3	0	0	2	X	7

Sheet C	1	2	3	4	5	6	7	8	Final
(Manitoba) Kerri Einarson 🔨	2	0	3	0	3	0	X	X	8
(British Columbia) Clancy Grandy	0	1	0	2	0	1	X	X	4

Sheet D	1	2	3	4	5	6	7	8	Final
(Manitoba) Jennifer Jones 🔨	1	0	1	1	0	1	1	0	5
(Switzerland) Raphaela Keiser	0	1	0	0	2	0	0	1	4

==== Draw 13 ====
Friday, December 9, 8:00 am

Sheet A	1	2	3	4	5	6	7	8	Final
(Ontario) Team Homan	0	2	2	1	1	1	X	X	7
(Manitoba) Chelsea Carey 🔨	2	0	0	0	0	0	X	X	2

Sheet B	1	2	3	4	5	6	7	8	Final
(South Korea) Gim Eun-ji 🔨	2	2	0	2	1	0	1	X	8
(Switzerland) Michèle Jäggi	0	0	2	0	0	2	0	X	4

Sheet C	1	2	3	4	5	6	7	8	Final
(Sweden) Anna Hasselborg 🔨	1	1	0	2	2	0	1	X	7
(Sweden) Isabella Wranå	0	0	1	0	0	2	0	X	3

Sheet D	1	2	3	4	5	6	7	8	Final
(Alberta) Team Scheidegger 🔨	2	0	1	2	1	0	X	X	6
(Switzerland) Silvana Tirinzoni	0	1	0	0	0	1	X	X	2

==== Draw 15 ====
Friday, December 9, 3:30 pm

Sheet A	1	2	3	4	5	6	7	8	Final
(Manitoba) Kerri Einarson	0	2	2	1	2	0	1	X	8
(Japan) Satsuki Fujisawa 🔨	3	0	0	0	0	2	0	X	5

Sheet B	1	2	3	4	5	6	7	8	Final
(South Korea) Kim Eun-jung 🔨	2	0	1	0	1	1	1	X	6
(Switzerland) Raphaela Keiser	0	2	0	1	0	0	0	X	3

Sheet C	1	2	3	4	5	6	7	8	Final
(Manitoba) Team Lawes	0	0	2	0	1	0	2	0	5
(Manitoba) Jennifer Jones 🔨	2	2	0	1	0	1	0	1	7

Sheet D	1	2	3	4	5	6	7	8	Final
(British Columbia) Clancy Grandy	0	1	0	0	1	0	X	X	2
(United States) Tabitha Peterson 🔨	2	0	1	1	0	4	X	X	8

=== Tiebreakers ===
Saturday, December 10, 8:00 am

Sheet B	1	2	3	4	5	6	7	8	Final
(Alberta) Team Scheidegger	0	0	0	2	0	0	2	0	4
(Manitoba) Chelsea Carey 🔨	1	1	1	0	1	2	0	1	7

Player percentages
(Alberta) Team Scheidegger		(Manitoba) Team Carey	
Mackenzie Elias	84%	Rachel Erickson	77%
Taylor McDonald	69%	Laurie St-Georges	78%
Meghan Walter	63%	Jamie Sinclair	61%
Kate Hogan	72%	Chelsea Carey	64%
Total	72%	Total	70%

Sheet D	1	2	3	4	5	6	7	8	Final
(Switzerland) Michèle Jäggi	0	0	1	0	1	0	0	0	2
(Sweden) Anna Hasselborg 🔨	1	0	0	2	0	0	0	2	5

Player percentages
(Switzerland) Team Jäggi		(Sweden) Team Hasselborg	
Sarah Müller	77%	Therese Westman	90%
Stefanie Berset	75%	Sofia Mabergs	94%
Irene Schori	69%	Agnes Knochenhauer	92%
Michèle Jäggi	83%	Anna Hasselborg	86%
Total	76%	Total	90%

=== Playoffs ===
Quarterfinals
1	(Manitoba) Kerri Einarson	5
8	(Manitoba) Chelsea Carey	4
4	(Manitoba) Team Lawes	5
5	(United States) Tabitha Peterson	6
2	(Ontario) Team Homan	5
7	(Sweden) Anna Hasselborg	2
3	(South Korea) Gim Eun-ji	9
6	(Manitoba) Jennifer Jones	6

Semifinals
1	(Manitoba) Kerri Einarson	8
5	(United States) Tabitha Peterson	3
2	(Ontario) Team Homan	5
3	(South Korea) Gim Eun-ji	3

Final
1	(Manitoba) Kerri Einarson	6
2	(Ontario) Team Homan	5

==== Quarterfinals ====
Saturday, December 10, 3:30 pm

Sheet A	1	2	3	4	5	6	7	8	Final
(South Korea) Gim Eun-ji	0	3	2	0	2	0	2	X	9
(Manitoba) Jennifer Jones 🔨	2	0	0	1	0	3	0	X	6

Player percentages
(South Korea) Team Gim		(Manitoba) Team Jones	
Seol Ye-eun	80%	Emily Zacharias	94%
Kim Su-ji	89%	Mackenzie Zacharias	63%
Kim Min-ji	94%	Karlee Burgess	72%
Gim Eun-ji	83%	Jennifer Jones	57%
Total	87%	Total	71%

Sheet B	1	2	3	4	5	6	7	8	Final
(Manitoba) Team Lawes 🔨	1	0	2	0	1	0	1	0	5
(United States) Tabitha Peterson	0	1	0	2	0	1	0	2	6

Player percentages
(Manitoba) Team Lawes		(United States) Team Peterson	
Kristin MacCuish	94%	Tara Peterson	72%
Jocelyn Peterman	77%	Becca Hamilton	89%
Laura Walker	78%	Cory Thiesse	86%
Selena Njegovan	72%	Tabitha Peterson	88%
Total	80%	Total	84%

Sheet C	1	2	3	4	5	6	7	8	Final
(Ontario) Team Homan 🔨	0	2	0	0	1	0	1	1	5
(Sweden) Anna Hasselborg	1	0	0	0	0	1	0	0	2

Player percentages
(Ontario) Team Homan		(Sweden) Team Hasselborg	
Sarah Wilkes	77%	Therese Westman	89%
Emma Miskew	63%	Sofia Mabergs	69%
Tracy Fleury	75%	Agnes Knochenhauer	55%
Rachel Homan	75%	Anna Hasselborg	81%
Total	72%	Total	73%

Sheet D	1	2	3	4	5	6	7	8	9	Final
(Manitoba) Kerri Einarson 🔨	0	1	0	1	0	1	1	0	1	5
(Manitoba) Chelsea Carey	0	0	1	0	2	0	0	1	0	4

Player percentages
(Manitoba) Team Einarson		(Manitoba) Team Carey	
Briane Harris	93%	Rachel Erickson	89%
Shannon Birchard	83%	Laurie St-Georges	88%
Val Sweeting	82%	Jamie Sinclair	92%
Kerri Einarson	90%	Chelsea Carey	87%
Total	87%	Total	89%

==== Semifinals ====
Saturday, December 10, 7:30 pm

Sheet A	1	2	3	4	5	6	7	8	Final
(Manitoba) Kerri Einarson 🔨	2	0	1	0	1	2	2	X	8
(United States) Tabitha Peterson	0	1	0	2	0	0	0	X	3

Player percentages
(Manitoba) Team Einarson		(United States) Team Peterson	
Briane Harris	91%	Tara Peterson	96%
Shannon Birchard	79%	Becca Hamilton	98%
Val Sweeting	86%	Cory Thiesse	80%
Kerri Einarson	80%	Tabitha Peterson	64%
Total	84%	Total	85%

Sheet B	1	2	3	4	5	6	7	8	Final
(Ontario) Team Homan 🔨	0	1	0	0	1	1	2	X	5
(South Korea) Gim Eun-ji	0	0	0	3	0	0	0	X	3

Player percentages
(Ontario) Team Homan		(South Korea) Team Gim	
Sarah Wilkes	97%	Seol Ye-eun	84%
Emma Miskew	92%	Kim Su-ji	78%
Tracy Fleury	80%	Kim Min-ji	67%
Rachel Homan	92%	Gim Eun-ji	77%
Total	90%	Total	77%

==== Final ====
Sunday, December 11, 1:00 pm

Sheet C	1	2	3	4	5	6	7	8	9	Final
(Manitoba) Kerri Einarson 🔨	2	0	0	1	0	2	0	0	1	6
(Ontario) Team Homan	0	1	0	0	3	0	0	1	0	5

Player percentages
(Manitoba) Team Einarson		(Ontario) Team Homan	
Briane Harris	83%	Sarah Wilkes	86%
Shannon Birchard	86%	Emma Miskew	88%
Val Sweeting	67%	Tracy Fleury	78%
Kerri Einarson	86%	Rachel Homan	92%
Total	81%	Total	86%
