= 2026 Euro Super Series =

- Host city: Stirling, Scotland
- Arena: National Curling Academy
- Dates: 20–23 August
- Men's winner: (Switzerland) Team Schwaller
- Curling club: CC Genève, Geneva
- Skip: Yannick Schwaller
- Fourth: Benoît Schwarz-van Berkel
- Second: Sven Michel
- Lead: Pablo Lachat-Couchepin
- Coach: Håvard Vad Petersson
- Finalist: (Scotland) Grant Hardie
- Women's winner: (Switzerland) Team Pätz
- Curling club: CC Genève, Geneva
- Skip: Alina Pätz
- Third: Selina Witschonke
- Second: Stefanie Berset
- Lead: Renée Frigo
- Finalist: (Switzerland) Xenia Schwaller

The 2026 Euro Super Series was a curling event held from 20 to 23 August at the National Curling Academy in Stirling, Scotland. The total purse for the event was £9,500 on both the men's and women's sides.

Yannick Schwaller's Swiss rink continued their momentum from the 2026 Baden Masters the weekend prior, defeating Grant Hardie's new Scottish squad 8–2 to claim their second event title of the season. With the win, the 2026 Olympic bronze medalists improved their season record to 13–1 and surpassed Bruce Mouat as the number one ranked team in the world. On the women's side, Alina Pätz and her new rink bested Xenia Schwaller's reigning world championship rink 8–5 in an all-Swiss battle.

For the 2026–27 season, the event was a satellite Grand Slam of Curling event. The highest ranking non-qualified team on the men's and women's sides earned a spot at the 2026 GSOC Invitational, the first Grand Slam of the season. With all teams in the finals already being qualified, these berths went to Italy's Stefano Spiller and Giulia Zardini Lacedelli as the higher ranked semifinal finishers. Team Spiller, however, declined the invitation, and the spot went to the other semifinalist Scotland's Orrin Carson.

The event adopted the same rules used in Grand Slam play with draw-to-the-button shootouts replacing extra ends and only one blank being allowed per team per game.

This was the first event for both the new Bruce Mouat and Grant Hardie rinks after Hardie left the team following the 2025–26 season. He teamed up with the former Ross Whyte team, taking over as skip and third, while Robin Brydone joined Team Mouat as their new third. It was also the debut event for the Oskar Eriksson rink out of Sweden following the retirement of Niklas Edin. On the women's side, Stefania Constantini and Giulia Zardini Lacedelli debuted their new rinks following their dissolution while Alina Pätz and her new Swiss team entered as the second highest ranked team.

== Men ==
=== Teams ===
The teams are listed as follows:

Skip	Third	Second	Lead	Locale
Ethan Brewster	Callum Grant	Tom Cormack	Cameron Lindsay	Aberdeen, Scotland
Cameron Bryce	Karsten Sturmay	Scott Hyslop	Robin McCall	Kelso, Scotland
Orrin Carson	Logan Carson	Archie Hyslop	Charlie Gibb	Dumfries, Scotland
Rasmus Wranå (Fourth)	Christoffer Sundgren (Skip)	– (Note: Team Eriksson played with three players. Christoffer Sundgren took over as skip.)	Simon Olofsson	Karlstad, Sweden
Ross Whyte (Fourth)	Grant Hardie (Skip)	Craig Waddell	Euan Kyle	Stirling, Scotland
Philipp Hösli (Fourth)	Marco Hösli (Skip)	Simon Gloor	Justin Hausherr	Glarus, Switzerland
Bruce Mouat	Robin Brydone	Bobby Lammie	Hammy McMillan Jr.	Edinburgh, Scotland
Joël Retornaz	Stefano Gilli	Andrea Gilli	Alberto Pimpini	Brunico, Italy
Kim Schwaller	Max Winz	Andreas Gerlach	Jan Iseli	Oberwallis, Switzerland
Benoît Schwarz-van Berkel (Fourth)	Yannick Schwaller (Skip)	Sven Michel	Pablo Lachat-Couchepin	Geneva, Switzerland
Stefano Spiller	Amos Mosaner	Sebastiano Arman	Cesare Spiller	Trentino, Italy
Kyle Waddell	Mark Watt	Angus Bryce	Blair Haswell	Hamilton, Scotland

=== Round robin standings ===
Final Round Robin Standings

Key
Teams to Playoffs

Pool A	W	SOW	SOL	L	PF	PA	Pts
(Italy) Stefano Spiller	3	1	0	0	30	17	11
(Scotland) Orrin Carson	2	0	1	1	24	22	7
(Scotland) Bruce Mouat	2	0	0	2	20	17	6
(Switzerland) Marco Hösli	0	0	0	4	13	23	0

Pool B	W	SOW	SOL	L	PF	PA	Pts
(Switzerland) Yannick Schwaller	4	0	0	0	31	14	12
(Italy) Joël Retornaz	3	0	0	1	24	19	9
(Scotland) Kyle Waddell	1	0	0	3	15	28	3
(Scotland) Cameron Bryce	0	0	0	4	12	30	0

Pool C	W	SOW	SOL	L	PF	PA	Pts
(Scotland) Grant Hardie	4	0	0	0	34	10	12
(Switzerland) Kim Schwaller	2	0	0	2	20	22	6
(Sweden) Team Eriksson	2	0	0	2	20	22	6
(Scotland) Ethan Brewster	0	0	0	4	13	32	0

=== Round robin results ===
All draw times are listed in British Summer Time (UTC+01:00).

==== Draw 1 ====
Thursday, 20 August, 9:00 am

Sheet A	1	2	3	4	5	6	7	8	9	Final
(Italy) Stefano Spiller 🔨	2	0	1	2	0	0	2	0	1	8
(Scotland) Orrin Carson	0	1	0	0	2	1	0	3	0	7

Sheet B	1	2	3	4	5	6	7	8	Final
(Switzerland) Marco Hösli	0	0	2	0	1	0	0	X	3
(Switzerland) Kim Schwaller 🔨	1	0	0	1	0	1	2	X	5

Sheet C	1	2	3	4	5	6	7	8	Final
(Scotland) Kyle Waddell	0	1	0	2	1	0	1	1	6
(Scotland) Cameron Bryce 🔨	1	0	2	0	0	2	0	0	5

Sheet D	1	2	3	4	5	6	7	8	Final
(Sweden) Team Eriksson 🔨	0	1	0	0	1	0	2	1	5
(Italy) Joël Retornaz	2	0	1	1	0	2	0	0	6

==== Draw 3 ====
Thursday, 20 August, 4:00 pm

Sheet A	1	2	3	4	5	6	7	8	Final
(Scotland) Bruce Mouat 🔨	3	0	1	0	0	1	1	X	6
(Switzerland) Marco Hösli	0	1	0	1	0	0	0	X	2

Sheet B	1	2	3	4	5	6	7	8	Final
(Scotland) Kyle Waddell	0	1	0	0	1	0	1	X	3
(Italy) Joël Retornaz 🔨	1	0	2	1	0	3	0	X	7

Sheet C	1	2	3	4	5	6	7	8	Final
(Scotland) Grant Hardie	4	2	0	0	3	0	X	X	9
(Scotland) Ethan Brewster 🔨	0	0	1	0	0	1	X	X	2

Sheet D	1	2	3	4	5	6	7	8	Final
(Switzerland) Yannick Schwaller 🔨	3	0	1	1	0	2	X	X	7
(Scotland) Cameron Bryce	0	1	0	0	1	0	X	X	2

==== Draw 5 ====
Friday, 21 August, 9:00 am

Sheet A	1	2	3	4	5	6	7	8	Final
(Switzerland) Yannick Schwaller 🔨	0	0	1	0	4	0	3	X	8
(Scotland) Kyle Waddell	0	2	0	1	0	1	0	X	4

Sheet B	1	2	3	4	5	6	7	8	Final
(Scotland) Bruce Mouat 🔨	2	0	0	0	1	0	0	X	3
(Italy) Stefano Spiller	0	0	2	1	0	4	1	X	8

Sheet C	1	2	3	4	5	6	7	8	Final
(Sweden) Team Eriksson	0	2	1	0	1	2	0	X	6
(Switzerland) Kim Schwaller 🔨	1	0	0	1	0	0	1	X	3

Sheet D	1	2	3	4	5	6	7	8	Final
(Switzerland) Marco Hösli 🔨	0	1	0	1	0	1	0	X	3
(Scotland) Orrin Carson	1	0	1	0	2	0	2	X	6

==== Draw 7 ====
Friday, 21 August, 4:00 pm

Sheet A	1	2	3	4	5	6	7	8	Final
(Italy) Joël Retornaz 🔨	2	0	2	2	0	3	X	X	9
(Scotland) Cameron Bryce	0	2	0	0	1	0	X	X	3

Sheet B	1	2	3	4	5	6	7	8	Final
(Sweden) Team Eriksson 🔨	1	0	2	0	0	2	2	X	7
(Scotland) Ethan Brewster	0	2	0	0	1	0	0	X	3

Sheet C	1	2	3	4	5	6	7	8	Final
(Scotland) Bruce Mouat 🔨	1	0	1	1	0	0	0	X	3
(Scotland) Orrin Carson	0	1	0	0	3	1	0	X	5

Sheet D	1	2	3	4	5	6	7	8	Final
(Scotland) Grant Hardie 🔨	2	0	3	0	2	0	X	X	7
(Switzerland) Kim Schwaller	0	1	0	2	0	1	X	X	4

==== Draw 9 ====
Saturday, 22 August, 9:00 am

Sheet A	1	2	3	4	5	6	7	8	Final
(Scotland) Grant Hardie 🔨	0	4	0	1	5	X	X	X	10
(Sweden) Team Eriksson	1	0	1	0	0	X	X	X	2

Sheet B	1	2	3	4	5	6	7	8	Final
(Switzerland) Yannick Schwaller 🔨	0	3	0	2	0	0	0	3	8
(Scotland) Orrin Carson	2	0	1	0	1	1	1	0	6

Sheet C	1	2	3	4	5	6	7	8	Final
(Switzerland) Marco Hösli	0	2	0	1	0	1	1	0	5
(Italy) Stefano Spiller 🔨	1	0	2	0	2	0	0	1	6

Sheet D	1	2	3	4	5	6	7	8	Final
(Scotland) Bruce Mouat 🔨	2	2	0	3	0	1	X	X	8
(Scotland) Ethan Brewster	0	0	1	0	1	0	X	X	2

==== Draw 11 ====
Saturday, 22 August, 4:00 pm

Sheet A	1	2	3	4	5	6	7	8	Final
(Switzerland) Kim Schwaller 🔨	2	1	2	0	2	0	0	1	8
(Scotland) Ethan Brewster	0	0	0	3	0	1	2	0	6

Sheet B	1	2	3	4	5	6	7	8	Final
(Scotland) Grant Hardie	0	0	3	2	3	X	X	X	8
(Scotland) Cameron Bryce 🔨	1	1	0	0	0	X	X	X	2

Sheet C	1	2	3	4	5	6	7	8	Final
(Switzerland) Yannick Schwaller 🔨	3	0	0	3	2	X	X	X	8
(Italy) Joël Retornaz	0	1	1	0	0	X	X	X	2

Sheet D	1	2	3	4	5	6	7	8	Final
(Scotland) Kyle Waddell	0	0	0	2	0	0	X	X	2
(Italy) Stefano Spiller 🔨	2	2	1	0	2	1	X	X	8

=== Playoffs ===
Quarterfinals
4	(Italy) Joël Retornaz	7
5	(Scotland) Orrin Carson	9
3	(Italy) Stefano Spiller	7
6	(Switzerland) Kim Schwaller	2

Semifinals
1	(Switzerland) Yannick Schwaller	7
5	(Scotland) Orrin Carson	6
2	(Scotland) Grant Hardie	7
3	(Italy) Stefano Spiller	5

Final
1	(Switzerland) Yannick Schwaller	8
2	(Scotland) Grant Hardie	2

==== Quarterfinals ====
Sunday, 23 August, 8:00 am

Sheet C	1	2	3	4	5	6	7	8	Final
(Italy) Stefano Spiller 🔨	1	2	0	2	0	2	X	X	7
(Switzerland) Kim Schwaller	0	0	1	0	1	0	X	X	2

Sheet D	1	2	3	4	5	6	7	8	9	Final
(Italy) Joël Retornaz 🔨	3	0	0	0	1	0	0	3	0	7
(Scotland) Orrin Carson	0	2	0	2	0	2	1	0	2	9

==== Semifinals ====
Sunday, 23 August, 11:45 am

Sheet A	1	2	3	4	5	6	7	8	Final
(Scotland) Grant Hardie 🔨	1	0	0	2	0	2	0	2	7
(Italy) Stefano Spiller	0	2	0	0	1	0	2	0	5

Sheet B	1	2	3	4	5	6	7	8	Final
(Switzerland) Yannick Schwaller 🔨	2	0	1	0	2	0	0	2	7
(Scotland) Orrin Carson	0	1	0	2	0	0	3	0	6

==== Final ====
Sunday, 23 August, 2:45 pm

Sheet C	1	2	3	4	5	6	7	8	Final
(Switzerland) Yannick Schwaller 🔨	3	0	1	0	4	X	X	X	8
(Scotland) Grant Hardie	0	1	0	1	0	X	X	X	2

== Women ==
=== Teams ===
The teams are listed as follows:

Skip	Third	Second	Lead	Alternate	Locale
Lucrezia Grande	Angela Romei	– (Note: Team Constantini played with three players. Lucrezia Grande took over as skip.)	Allegra Grande		Cortina d'Ampezzo, Italy
Fay Henderson	Lisa Davie	Laura Watt	Katie McMillan	Sophie Sinclair	Stirling, Scotland
Corrie Hürlimann	Marina Lörtscher	Celine Schwizgebel	Isabel Einspieler		Zug, Switzerland
Tia Laurie	Amy Mitchell	Cara Davidson	Holly Burke	Kirsty Gallacher	Stirling, Scotland
Rebecca Mariani	Giada Zambelli	Letizia Carlisano	Camilla Gilberti		Brunico, Italy
Alina Pätz	Selina Witschonke	Stefanie Berset	Renée Frigo		Geneva, Switzerland
Maia Ramsfjell	Robyn Munro	Mille Haslev Nordbye	Eilin Kjærland		Lillehammer, Norway
Xenia Schwaller	Selina Gafner	Fabienne Rieder	Selina Rychiger		Zurich, Switzerland
Amy Seftor	Cara Thomson	Clare Cassells	Islay McKenzie		Edinburgh, Scotland
Callie Soutar	Holly Clemie	Eve Hare	Hannah Young	Lillia Clarke	Forfar, Scotland
Isabella Wranå	Almida de Val	Moa Dryburgh	Maria Larsson		Sundbyberg, Sweden
Giulia Zardini Lacedelli	Elena Mathis	Marta Lo Deserto	Rachele Scalesse		Cortina d'Ampezzo, Italy

=== Round robin standings ===
Final Round Robin Standings

Key
Teams to Playoffs

Pool A	W	SOW	SOL	L	PF	PA	Pts
(Switzerland) Xenia Schwaller	4	0	0	0	34	9	12
(Scotland) Fay Henderson	3	0	0	1	22	15	9
(Norway) Maia Ramsfjell	1	0	0	3	14	25	3
(Italy) Rebecca Mariani	0	0	0	4	12	32	0

Pool B	W	SOW	SOL	L	PF	PA	Pts
(Italy) Giulia Zardini Lacedelli	3	1	0	0	25	13	11
(Switzerland) Alina Pätz	3	0	1	0	32	15	10
(Italy) Team Constantini	0	1	0	3	16	27	2
(Scotland) Amy Seftor	0	0	1	3	17	29	1

Pool C	W	SOW	SOL	L	PF	PA	Pts
(Sweden) Isabella Wranå	2	1	0	1	25	20	8
(Switzerland) Corrie Hürlimann	2	0	2	0	22	20	8
(Scotland) Callie Soutar	2	0	0	2	19	25	6
(Scotland) Tia Laurie	0	1	0	3	19	27	2

=== Round robin results ===
All draw times are listed in British Summer Time (UTC+01:00).

==== Draw 2 ====
Thursday, 20 August, 12:30 pm

Sheet A	1	2	3	4	5	6	7	8	Final
(Norway) Maia Ramsfjell 🔨	2	0	1	1	0	2	1	X	7
(Italy) Rebecca Mariani	0	1	0	0	2	0	0	X	3

Sheet B	1	2	3	4	5	6	7	8	Final
(Scotland) Fay Henderson 🔨	0	0	1	0	1	0	2	1	5
(Scotland) Tia Laurie	0	1	0	1	0	1	0	0	3

Sheet C	1	2	3	4	5	6	7	8	Final
(Italy) Giulia Zardini Lacedelli	0	2	1	1	0	4	0	X	8
(Scotland) Amy Seftor 🔨	1	0	0	0	1	0	1	X	3

Sheet D	1	2	3	4	5	6	7	8	Final
(Switzerland) Corrie Hürlimann 🔨	0	1	0	1	1	1	1	X	5
(Italy) Team Constantini	1	0	2	0	0	0	0	X	3

==== Draw 4 ====
Thursday, 20 August, 7:30 pm

Sheet A	1	2	3	4	5	6	7	8	Final
(Switzerland) Xenia Schwaller 🔨	2	0	3	0	0	0	2	X	7
(Scotland) Fay Henderson	0	1	0	0	1	0	0	X	2

Sheet B	1	2	3	4	5	6	7	8	Final
(Italy) Giulia Zardini Lacedelli 🔨	0	1	0	0	2	3	1	X	7
(Italy) Team Constantini	0	0	1	1	0	0	0	X	2

Sheet C	1	2	3	4	5	6	7	8	Final
(Sweden) Isabella Wranå	0	1	1	0	2	0	0	1	5
(Scotland) Callie Soutar 🔨	1	0	0	2	0	2	1	0	6

Sheet D	1	2	3	4	5	6	7	8	Final
(Switzerland) Alina Pätz 🔨	2	0	5	0	1	0	X	X	8
(Scotland) Amy Seftor	0	1	0	1	0	1	X	X	3

==== Draw 6 ====
Friday, 21 August, 12:30 pm

Sheet A	1	2	3	4	5	6	7	8	9	Final
(Switzerland) Alina Pätz	0	1	0	1	0	0	1	1	0	4
(Italy) Giulia Zardini Lacedelli 🔨	0	0	2	0	1	1	0	0	1	5

Sheet B	1	2	3	4	5	6	7	8	Final
(Switzerland) Xenia Schwaller	1	0	2	1	5	X	X	X	9
(Norway) Maia Ramsfjell 🔨	0	1	0	0	0	X	X	X	1

Sheet C	1	2	3	4	5	6	7	8	9	Final
(Switzerland) Corrie Hürlimann 🔨	2	0	1	0	1	0	2	1	0	7
(Scotland) Tia Laurie	0	3	0	2	0	2	0	0	1	8

Sheet D	1	2	3	4	5	6	7	8	Final
(Scotland) Fay Henderson	0	2	0	2	0	3	0	X	7
(Italy) Rebecca Mariani 🔨	0	0	1	0	1	0	1	X	3

==== Draw 8 ====
Friday, 21 August, 7:30 pm

Sheet A	1	2	3	4	5	6	7	8	9	Final
(Italy) Team Constantini 🔨	1	0	1	0	1	1	1	0	1	6
(Scotland) Amy Seftor	0	1	0	3	0	0	0	1	0	5

Sheet B	1	2	3	4	5	6	7	8	Final
(Switzerland) Corrie Hürlimann	0	2	0	2	0	0	1	X	5
(Scotland) Callie Soutar 🔨	1	0	1	0	0	1	0	X	3

Sheet C	1	2	3	4	5	6	7	8	Final
(Switzerland) Xenia Schwaller	1	2	0	3	0	2	0	X	8
(Italy) Rebecca Mariani 🔨	0	0	2	0	1	0	1	X	4

Sheet D	1	2	3	4	5	6	7	8	Final
(Sweden) Isabella Wranå 🔨	3	0	0	0	2	0	2	X	7
(Scotland) Tia Laurie	0	0	1	1	0	1	0	X	3

==== Draw 10 ====
Saturday, 22 August, 12:30 pm

Sheet A	1	2	3	4	5	6	7	8	9	Final
(Sweden) Isabella Wranå 🔨	2	1	0	1	0	0	1	0	1	6
(Switzerland) Corrie Hürlimann	0	0	1	0	2	1	0	1	0	5

Sheet B	1	2	3	4	5	6	7	8	Final
(Switzerland) Alina Pätz 🔨	2	0	2	2	4	X	X	X	10
(Italy) Rebecca Mariani	0	2	0	0	0	X	X	X	2

Sheet C	1	2	3	4	5	6	7	8	Final
(Scotland) Fay Henderson 🔨	2	1	0	1	0	4	X	X	8
(Norway) Maia Ramsfjell	0	0	1	0	1	0	X	X	2

Sheet D	1	2	3	4	5	6	7	8	Final
(Switzerland) Xenia Schwaller 🔨	2	0	3	4	0	1	X	X	10
(Scotland) Callie Soutar	0	1	0	0	1	0	X	X	2

==== Draw 12 ====
Saturday, 22 August, 7:30 pm

Sheet A	1	2	3	4	5	6	7	8	Final
(Scotland) Tia Laurie 🔨	1	0	0	2	0	1	1	0	5
(Scotland) Callie Soutar	0	3	0	0	3	0	0	2	8

Sheet B	1	2	3	4	5	6	7	8	Final
(Sweden) Isabella Wranå 🔨	3	0	1	0	2	1	0	0	7
(Scotland) Amy Seftor	0	1	0	2	0	0	2	1	6

Sheet C	1	2	3	4	5	6	7	8	Final
(Switzerland) Alina Pätz	0	0	3	0	3	2	2	X	10
(Italy) Team Constantini 🔨	1	3	0	1	0	0	0	X	5

Sheet D	1	2	3	4	5	6	7	8	Final
(Italy) Giulia Zardini Lacedelli	0	1	3	0	1	0	0	X	5
(Norway) Maia Ramsfjell 🔨	1	0	0	2	0	1	0	X	4

=== Playoffs ===
Quarterfinals
4	(Scotland) Fay Henderson	6
5	(Sweden) Isabella Wranå	5
3	(Switzerland) Alina Pätz	7
6	(Switzerland) Corrie Hürlimann	1

Semifinals
1	(Switzerland) Xenia Schwaller	7
4	(Scotland) Fay Henderson	2
2	(Italy) Giulia Zardini Lacedelli	3
3	(Switzerland) Alina Pätz	6

Final
1	(Switzerland) Xenia Schwaller	5
3	(Switzerland) Alina Pätz	8

==== Quarterfinals ====
Sunday, 23 August, 8:00 am

Sheet A	1	2	3	4	5	6	7	8	Final
(Scotland) Fay Henderson 🔨	0	2	0	1	1	0	0	2	6
(Sweden) Isabella Wranå	0	0	3	0	0	1	1	0	5

Sheet B	1	2	3	4	5	6	7	8	Final
(Switzerland) Alina Pätz 🔨	2	2	1	0	0	2	X	X	7
(Switzerland) Corrie Hürlimann	0	0	0	1	0	0	X	X	1

==== Semifinals ====
Sunday, 23 August, 11:45 am

Sheet C	1	2	3	4	5	6	7	8	Final
(Italy) Giulia Zardini Lacedelli 🔨	0	0	0	0	1	0	2	X	3
(Switzerland) Alina Pätz	2	0	1	1	0	2	0	X	6

Sheet D	1	2	3	4	5	6	7	8	Final
(Switzerland) Xenia Schwaller 🔨	2	0	1	2	2	0	X	X	7
(Scotland) Fay Henderson	0	1	0	0	0	1	X	X	2

==== Final ====
Sunday, 23 August, 2:45 pm

Sheet B	1	2	3	4	5	6	7	8	Final
(Switzerland) Xenia Schwaller 🔨	0	2	0	2	0	0	1	X	5
(Switzerland) Alina Pätz	0	0	2	0	4	2	0	X	8
