= 2025 Euro Super Series =

- Host city: Stirling, Scotland
- Arena: National Curling Academy
- Dates: 21–24 August
- Men's winner: (Scotland) Team Mouat
- Curling club: Curl Edinburgh, Edinburgh
- Skip: Bruce Mouat
- Third: Grant Hardie
- Second: Bobby Lammie
- Lead: Hammy McMillan Jr.
- Coach: Michael Goodfellow
- Finalist: (China) Xu Xiaoming
- Women's winner: (United States) Team Peterson
- Curling club: St. Paul CC, Saint Paul
- Skip: Tabitha Peterson
- Third: Cory Thiesse
- Second: Tara Peterson
- Lead: Taylor Anderson-Heide
- Coach: Cathy Overton-Clapham
- Finalist: (Scotland) Team Morrison

The 2025 Euro Super Series is a curling event. It was held from 21 to 24 August at the National Curling Academy in Stirling, Scotland. The total purse for the event was £15,000 on the men's and £10,000 for the women's events.

World number one ranked Bruce Mouat won the men's event for a third straight year, defeating China's Xu Xiaoming 7–5 in the final. The Mouat rink won all seven of their games en route to claiming the title, improving their season record to 12–1 after a semifinal finish at the 2025 Baden Masters. Team Xu had a quarterfinal finish at the Baden Masters before reaching the final in Stirling, improving their world ranking from sixteenth to fourteenth. Teams John Shuster and Lukáš Klíma lost in the semifinals to Mouat and Xu respectively while Korey Dropkin, Cameron Bryce, Ross Whyte and Orrin Carson rounded out the playoff field.

The United States' Tabitha Peterson, who was fresh off winning the 2025 United States Pan Continental Qualifier continued her strong play to claim the women's title, defeating Rebecca Morrison's Scottish side 5–2 in the final. At both events, Team Peterson began with two straight losses before running the table to win both, improving to a 7–4 win-loss record. It was a season debut for Olympic qualified Morrison, as well as Madeleine Dupont and Stefania Constantini who lost out in the semifinals respectively.

== Men ==
=== Teams ===
The teams are listed as follows:

Skip	Third	Second	Lead	Alternate	Locale
Michael Brunner	Anthony Petoud	Romano Keller-Meier	Andreas Gerlach		Bern, Switzerland
Cameron Bryce	Duncan Menzies	Scott Hyslop	Robin McCall		Kelso, Scotland
Orrin Carson	Logan Carson	Archie Hyslop	Charlie Gibb		Dumfries, Scotland
James Craik	Fraser Swanston	Jake MacDonald	Rory Macnair		Forfar, Scotland
Korey Dropkin	Thomas Howell	Andrew Stopera	Mark Fenner		(United States) Duluth, Minnesota
Wouter Gösgens	Tobias van den Hurk	Jaap van Dorp	Laurens Hoekman	Alexander Magan	Zoetermeer, Netherlands
Lukáš Klíma	Marek Černovský	Martin Jurík	Lukáš Klípa	Radek Boháč	Prague, Czech Republic
Bruce Mouat	Grant Hardie	Bobby Lammie	Hammy McMillan Jr.		Edinburgh, Scotland
Marc Pfister	Christian Haller	Enrico Pfister	Alan Frei	Benjo Delarmente	Manila, Philippines
John Shuster	Christopher Plys	Colin Hufman	John Landsteiner		(United States) Duluth, Minnesota
Aaran Thomson	Stewart Kyle	Sam McConnachie	Lewis McCabe		Perth, Scotland
Kyle Waddell	Mark Watt (Note: Alternate Mark Watt played third, replacing Craig Waddell who spared on Team Whyte.)	Angus Bryce	Blair Haswell		Hamilton, Scotland
Ross Whyte (Fourth)	Robin Brydone (Skip) (Note: Robin Brydone skipped Team Whyte.)	Craig Waddell (Note: Craig Waddell spared for Duncan McFadzean.)	Euan Kyle		Stirling, Scotland
Xu Xiaoming	Fei Xueqing	Li Zhichao	Xu Jingtao	Yang Bohao	Beijing, China

=== Round robin standings ===
Final Round Robin Standings

Key
Teams to Playoffs

Pool A	W	L	PF	PA
(Scotland) Team Whyte	2	1	17	17
(China) Xu Xiaoming	2	1	16	14
(Scotland) Kyle Waddell	2	1	20	13
(Philippines) Marc Pfister	0	3	14	23

Pool B	W	L	PF	PA
(Scotland) Bruce Mouat	4	0	24	12
(United States) John Shuster	3	1	27	14
(Scotland) Orrin Carson	1	3	16	22
(Switzerland) Michael Brunner	1	3	17	24
(Scotland) James Craik	1	3	13	25

Pool C	W	L	PF	PA
(Scotland) Cameron Bryce	3	1	28	21
(Czech Republic) Lukáš Klíma	3	1	29	17
(United States) Korey Dropkin	2	2	20	18
(Netherlands) Wouter Gösgens	1	3	18	22
(Scotland) Aaran Thomson	1	3	11	28

=== Round robin results ===
All draw times are listed in British Summer Time (UTC+01:00).

==== Draw 2 ====
Thursday, 21 August, 12:30 pm

Sheet A	1	2	3	4	5	6	7	8	Final
(United States) John Shuster 🔨	1	1	0	1	0	4	X	X	7
(Switzerland) Michael Brunner	0	0	1	0	1	0	X	X	2

Sheet B	1	2	3	4	5	6	7	8	Final
(Scotland) James Craik	0	0	2	0	1	0	1	0	4
(Scotland) Orrin Carson 🔨	0	1	0	0	0	1	0	1	3

Sheet C	1	2	3	4	5	6	7	8	Final
(Scotland) Cameron Bryce 🔨	2	0	0	1	0	1	0	3	7
(United States) Korey Dropkin	0	0	3	0	0	0	2	0	5

Sheet D	1	2	3	4	5	6	7	8	Final
(Czech Republic) Lukáš Klíma	0	0	1	2	0	2	1	2	8
(Scotland) Aaran Thomson 🔨	0	1	0	0	2	0	0	0	3

==== Draw 3 ====
Thursday, 21 August, 4:30 pm

Sheet A	1	2	3	4	5	6	7	8	Final
(Scotland) Team Whyte	0	2	0	3	0	0	2	X	7
(China) Xu Xiaoming 🔨	2	0	1	0	2	0	0	X	5

Sheet B	1	2	3	4	5	6	7	8	Final
(Philippines) Marc Pfister 🔨	4	0	1	0	1	1	0	0	7
(Scotland) Kyle Waddell	0	1	0	2	0	0	4	1	8

==== Draw 4 ====
Thursday, 21 August, 8:30 pm

Sheet A	1	2	3	4	5	6	7	8	Final
(United States) Korey Dropkin 🔨	0	2	0	0	1	1	0	X	4
(Netherlands) Wouter Gösgens	0	0	0	1	0	0	1	X	2

Sheet B	1	2	3	4	5	6	7	8	Final
(Scotland) Aaran Thomson	0	0	0	1	0	2	X	X	3
(Scotland) Cameron Bryce 🔨	1	4	2	0	3	0	X	X	10

Sheet C	1	2	3	4	5	6	7	8	Final
(Scotland) Orrin Carson	0	0	2	0	1	0	0	X	3
(United States) John Shuster 🔨	0	3	0	3	0	0	2	X	8

Sheet D	1	2	3	4	5	6	7	8	Final
(Scotland) Bruce Mouat 🔨	4	1	0	2	X	X	X	X	7
(Scotland) James Craik	0	0	1	0	X	X	X	X	1

==== Draw 6 ====
Friday, 22 August, 12:30 pm

Sheet A	1	2	3	4	5	6	7	8	Final
(United States) John Shuster	0	2	0	0	2	0	1	0	5
(Scotland) Bruce Mouat 🔨	2	0	1	1	0	0	0	2	6

Sheet B	1	2	3	4	5	6	7	8	Final
(Switzerland) Michael Brunner	0	1	1	0	1	0	2	0	5
(Scotland) Orrin Carson 🔨	2	0	0	1	0	2	0	1	6

Sheet C	1	2	3	4	5	6	7	8	Final
(Netherlands) Wouter Gösgens	0	0	0	2	0	0	1	0	3
(Scotland) Aaran Thomson 🔨	0	2	1	0	0	0	0	1	4

Sheet D	1	2	3	4	5	6	7	8	Final
(Scotland) Cameron Bryce	0	0	0	2	0	1	0	X	3
(Czech Republic) Lukáš Klíma 🔨	1	2	1	0	2	0	1	X	7

==== Draw 7 ====
Thursday, 22 August, 4:30 pm

Sheet A	1	2	3	4	5	6	7	8	Final
(Scotland) Kyle Waddell	0	1	0	1	1	0	0	1	4
(China) Xu Xiaoming 🔨	2	0	1	0	0	1	1	0	5

Sheet B	1	2	3	4	5	6	7	8	Final
(Scotland) Team Whyte 🔨	2	0	3	1	0	1	2	X	9
(Philippines) Marc Pfister	0	1	0	0	3	0	0	X	4

==== Draw 8 ====
Friday, 22 August, 8:30 pm

Sheet A	1	2	3	4	5	6	7	8	Final
(Czech Republic) Lukáš Klíma 🔨	0	2	0	0	0	2	2	0	6
(Netherlands) Wouter Gösgens	1	0	2	2	1	0	0	1	7

Sheet B	1	2	3	4	5	6	7	8	Final
(Scotland) Aaran Thomson	0	0	0	0	0	1	X	X	1
(United States) Korey Dropkin 🔨	0	2	1	1	3	0	X	X	7

Sheet C	1	2	3	4	5	6	7	8	Final
(Scotland) Bruce Mouat 🔨	0	3	0	0	2	1	X	X	6
(Switzerland) Michael Brunner	1	0	1	0	0	0	X	X	2

Sheet D	1	2	3	4	5	6	7	8	Final
(Scotland) James Craik 🔨	1	0	0	1	0	1	0	X	3
(United States) John Shuster	0	2	0	0	2	0	3	X	7

==== Draw 9 ====
Saturday, 23 August, 8:30 am

Sheet C	1	2	3	4	5	6	7	8	Final
(Scotland) Kyle Waddell 🔨	3	0	0	1	1	3	X	X	8
(Scotland) Team Whyte	0	1	0	0	0	0	X	X	1

Sheet D	1	2	3	4	5	6	7	8	Final
(Philippines) Marc Pfister 🔨	0	1	0	0	0	2	0	X	3
(China) Xu Xiaoming	1	0	1	0	3	0	1	X	6

==== Draw 10 ====
Saturday, 23 August, 12:30 pm

Sheet A	1	2	3	4	5	6	7	8	Final
(Scotland) Orrin Carson 🔨	2	0	0	1	0	0	1	0	4
(Scotland) Bruce Mouat	0	2	0	0	1	1	0	1	5

Sheet B	1	2	3	4	5	6	7	8	Final
(Switzerland) Michael Brunner 🔨	3	0	3	0	0	2	0	X	8
(Scotland) James Craik	0	2	0	2	0	0	1	X	5

Sheet C	1	2	3	4	5	6	7	8	Final
(United States) Korey Dropkin 🔨	2	0	1	0	1	0	0	0	4
(Czech Republic) Lukáš Klíma	0	1	0	2	0	0	4	1	8

Sheet D	1	2	3	4	5	6	7	8	Final
(Netherlands) Wouter Gösgens 🔨	0	2	0	1	0	2	0	1	6
(Scotland) Cameron Bryce	0	0	2	0	2	0	4	0	8

=== Playoffs ===
Quarterfinals
1	(Scotland) Bruce Mouat	7
8	(United States) Korey Dropkin	3
4	(Scotland) Cameron Bryce	1
5	(United States) John Shuster	8
2	(Scotland) Team Whyte	0
7	(Czech Republic) Lukáš Klíma	7
3	(China) Xu Xiaoming	7
6	(Scotland) Orrin Carson	3

Semifinals
1	(Scotland) Bruce Mouat	5
5	(United States) John Shuster	4
7	(Czech Republic) Lukáš Klíma	6
3	(China) Xu Xiaoming	7

Final
1	(Scotland) Bruce Mouat	7
3	(China) Xu Xiaoming	5

==== Quarterfinals ====
Saturday, 23 August, 8:30 pm

Sheet A	1	2	3	4	5	6	7	8	Final
(Scotland) Team Whyte	0	0	0	0	0	X	X	X	0
(Czech Republic) Lukáš Klíma 🔨	2	1	1	1	2	X	X	X	7

Sheet B	1	2	3	4	5	6	7	8	Final
(Scotland) Cameron Bryce 🔨	0	1	0	0	0	X	X	X	1
(United States) John Shuster	2	0	3	1	2	X	X	X	8

Sheet C	1	2	3	4	5	6	7	8	Final
(China) Xu Xiaoming 🔨	0	2	0	1	0	0	1	3	7
(Scotland) Orrin Carson	1	0	1	0	0	1	0	0	3

Sheet D	1	2	3	4	5	6	7	8	Final
(Scotland) Bruce Mouat 🔨	2	0	0	2	0	1	0	2	7
(United States) Korey Dropkin	0	0	1	0	1	0	1	0	3

==== Semifinals ====
Sunday, 24 August, 8:30 am

Sheet C	1	2	3	4	5	6	7	8	Final
(Scotland) Bruce Mouat 🔨	1	0	0	0	0	2	0	2	5
(United States) John Shuster	0	1	0	1	0	0	2	0	4

Sheet D	1	2	3	4	5	6	7	8	Final
(Czech Republic) Lukáš Klíma	0	1	0	1	0	0	4	0	6
(China) Xu Xiaoming 🔨	1	0	1	0	2	1	0	2	7

==== Final ====
Sunday, 24 August, 12:30 pm

Sheet B	1	2	3	4	5	6	7	8	Final
(Scotland) Bruce Mouat 🔨	2	0	2	0	2	0	1	X	7
(China) Xu Xiaoming	0	2	0	1	0	2	0	X	5

== Women ==
=== Teams ===
The teams are listed as follows:

Skip	Third	Second	Lead	Alternate	Locale
Stefania Constantini	Giulia Zardini Lacedelli	Elena Mathis	Marta Lo Deserto (Note: Alternate Marta Lo Deserto played lead, replacing Angela Romei.)		Cortina d'Ampezzo, Italy
Madeleine Dupont	Mathilde Halse	Jasmin Holtermann	Denise Dupont		Hvidovre, Denmark
Fay Henderson	Lisa Davie	Hailey Duff	Katie McMillan	Laura Watt	Stirling, Scotland
Tia Laurie	Cara Davidson	Kirsty Gallacher	Holly Burke		Stirling, Scotland
Rebecca Morrison (Fourth)	Jennifer Dodds	Sophie Sinclair	Sophie Jackson (Skip) (Note: Sophie Jackson skipped Team Morrison.)		Stirling, Scotland
Tabitha Peterson	Cory Thiesse	Tara Peterson	Taylor Anderson-Heide		(United States) Saint Paul, Minnesota
Callie Soutar	Eve Hare	Holly Clemie	Alison Hamilton		Forfar, Scotland
Delaney Strouse (Fourth)	Anne O'Hara	Sydney Mullaney	Madison Bear (Skip) (Note: Madison Bear skipped Team Strouse.)		(United States) Traverse City, Michigan

=== Round robin standings ===
Final Round Robin Standings

Key
Teams to Playoffs

Pool A	W	L	PF	PA
(Denmark) Madeleine Dupont	4	0	32	17
(Italy) Stefania Constantini	3	1	30	20
(United States) Team Strouse	2	2	20	16
(Scotland) Callie Soutar	0	4	5	34

Pool B	W	L	PF	PA
(Scotland) Team Morrison	3	1	27	17
(United States) Tabitha Peterson	2	2	19	20
(Scotland) Fay Henderson	1	3	23	25
(Scotland) Tia Laurie	1	3	18	25

=== Round robin results ===
All draw times are listed in British Summer Time (UTC+01:00).

==== Draw 1 ====
Thursday, 21 August, 8:30 am

Sheet A	1	2	3	4	5	6	7	8	Final
(Scotland) Fay Henderson 🔨	5	0	3	0	2	1	X	X	11
(Scotland) Callie Soutar	0	0	0	1	0	0	X	X	1

Sheet B	1	2	3	4	5	6	7	8	Final
(United States) Team Strouse 🔨	1	0	1	0	1	0	0	X	3
(Scotland) Team Morrison	0	2	0	3	0	0	1	X	6

==== Draw 3 ====
Thursday, 21 August, 4:30 pm

Sheet C	1	2	3	4	5	6	7	8	Final
(Scotland) Tia Laurie 🔨	0	1	0	0	2	0	0	X	3
(Denmark) Madeleine Dupont	2	0	4	0	0	0	2	X	8

Sheet D	1	2	3	4	5	6	7	8	Final
(Italy) Stefania Constantini	2	0	3	0	1	0	1	X	7
(United States) Tabitha Peterson 🔨	0	2	0	1	0	1	0	X	4

==== Draw 5 ====
Friday, 22 August, 8:30 am

Sheet A	1	2	3	4	5	6	7	8	Final
(Denmark) Madeleine Dupont 🔨	5	0	0	1	0	0	1	1	8
(United States) Tabitha Peterson	0	1	1	0	2	0	0	0	4

Sheet B	1	2	3	4	5	6	7	8	Final
(Scotland) Tia Laurie 🔨	2	0	1	0	0	1	0	X	4
(Italy) Stefania Constantini	0	2	0	4	0	0	3	X	9

Sheet C	1	2	3	4	5	6	7	8	Final
(Scotland) Callie Soutar	0	0	0	0	0	1	X	X	1
(Scotland) Team Morrison 🔨	0	4	1	3	2	0	X	X	10

Sheet D	1	2	3	4	5	6	7	8	Final
(Scotland) Fay Henderson	0	1	0	0	0	0	X	X	1
(United States) Team Strouse 🔨	2	0	1	2	1	1	X	X	7

==== Draw 7 ====
Friday, 22 August, 4:30 pm

Sheet C	1	2	3	4	5	6	7	8	Final
(United States) Team Strouse	2	0	0	1	0	1	0	0	4
(United States) Tabitha Peterson 🔨	0	1	1	0	1	0	2	1	6

Sheet D	1	2	3	4	5	6	7	8	Final
(Scotland) Tia Laurie	0	1	0	2	0	0	5	X	9
(Scotland) Callie Soutar 🔨	0	0	1	0	0	1	0	X	2

==== Draw 9 ====
Saturday, 23 August, 8:30 am

Sheet A	1	2	3	4	5	6	7	8	Final
(Italy) Stefania Constantini	0	0	0	2	0	0	2	1	5
(Scotland) Team Morrison 🔨	0	1	1	0	2	2	0	0	6

Sheet B	1	2	3	4	5	6	7	8	Final
(Scotland) Fay Henderson	0	2	1	0	0	2	0	0	5
(Denmark) Madeleine Dupont 🔨	1	0	0	4	0	0	2	1	8

==== Draw 11 ====
Saturday, 23 August, 4:30 pm

Sheet A	1	2	3	4	5	6	7	8	Final
(United States) Team Strouse 🔨	0	3	0	1	0	0	1	1	6
(Scotland) Tia Laurie	0	0	2	0	1	0	0	0	3

Sheet B	1	2	3	4	5	6	7	8	Final
(United States) Tabitha Peterson 🔨	0	2	0	0	0	1	2	X	5
(Scotland) Callie Soutar	0	0	0	1	0	0	0	X	1

Sheet C	1	2	3	4	5	6	7	8	Final
(Scotland) Fay Henderson	0	0	0	3	0	2	1	0	6
(Italy) Stefania Constantini 🔨	3	2	1	0	1	0	0	2	9

Sheet D	1	2	3	4	5	6	7	8	Final
(Denmark) Madeleine Dupont 🔨	2	0	2	0	2	0	2	X	8
(Scotland) Team Morrison	0	1	0	2	0	2	0	X	5

=== Playoffs ===
Semifinals
1	(Denmark) Madeleine Dupont	3
4	(United States) Tabitha Peterson	6
2	(Scotland) Team Morrison	4
3	(Italy) Stefania Constantini	1

Final
4	(United States) Tabitha Peterson	5
2	(Scotland) Team Morrison	2

==== Semifinals ====
Sunday, 24 August, 8:30 am

Sheet A	1	2	3	4	5	6	7	8	Final
(Denmark) Madeleine Dupont 🔨	0	0	0	1	1	1	0	X	3
(United States) Tabitha Peterson	1	2	2	0	0	0	1	X	6

Sheet B	1	2	3	4	5	6	7	8	Final
(Scotland) Team Morrison	0	0	0	2	1	0	1	X	4
(Italy) Stefania Constantini 🔨	0	1	0	0	0	0	0	X	1

==== Final ====
Sunday, 24 August, 12:30 pm

Sheet C	1	2	3	4	5	6	7	8	Final
(United States) Tabitha Peterson	0	2	0	0	0	0	3	X	5
(Scotland) Team Morrison 🔨	1	0	0	1	0	0	0	X	2
