= Euro Super Series =

Curling tournament in Scotland

- Established: 2021
- 2026 host city: Stirling, Scotland
- 2026 arena: National Curling Academy
- Purse: £ 9,500

Current champions (2026)
- Men: (Switzerland) Yannick Schwaller
- Women: (Switzerland) Alina Pätz

Current edition
- 2026 Euro Super Series

The Euro Super Series is a curling tournament held annually in August at the National Curling Academy in Stirling, Scotland. The event, which is put on by British Curling was first held in 2021 in a bid to "launch a new era of high class competition (in Europe)". As of the 2023 Euro Super Series, the tournament was expanded to include international teams outside of Europe as well. The purse for both the men's and women's events is £15,000, with the winners receiving £3,000.

The inaugural event saw team "GB Red" skipped by Rebecca Morrison defeat Sweden's Isabella Wranå in the women's final. British Curling decided to split their nine-player team into two squads for the event (red and blue) in preparation for the 2022 Winter Olympics. In the men's final, Switzerland's Yannick Schwaller defeated Scotland's Ross Whyte.

At the 2022 event, Germany's Daniela Jentsch defeated Norway's Team Rørvik, which was skipped by Maia Ramsfjell with the absence of regular skip Marianne Rørvik. In the men's event, Team Italy, skipped by Joël Retornaz downed the Korey Dropkin rink from the United States.

The 2023 event saw the return of Olympic champion Eve Muirhead who came out of retirement to spare for the Michèle Jäggi rink. The defending World Champion Bruce Mouat rink won the men's event on home ice, defeating their compatriots, the Ross Whyte rink in the final on the same weekend as Mouat's 29th birthday. The women's event was won by Delaney Strouse of the United States, who beat Italy's Stefania Constantini in the final.

The 2024 event saw a rematch of the men's final from the year prior with Bruce Mouat once again defeating Ross Whyte for a second consecutive year. Team Mouat, who also won the 2024 Baden Masters the week prior, improved their record to 14–0 to begin the 2024–25 season. The reigning Scottish women's champions Team Fay Henderson came out on top in the women's event, defeating Stefania Constantini's Italian rink to claim the title.

Bruce Mouat won his third straight ESS in 2025, defeating China's Xu Xiaoming 7–5 in the event final to begin the Olympic season. The women's final, meanwhile, saw Tabitha Peterson win the United States' second title by defeating Scotland's Rebecca Morrison 5–2.

== Champions ==
=== Men's ===
Year	Winning team	Runner up team	Purse (£)
2021	(Switzerland) Yannick Schwaller, Michael Brunner, Romano Meier, Marcel Käufeler	(Scotland) Ross Whyte, Robin Brydone, Duncan McFadzean, Euan Kyle	£6,000
2022	(Italy) Joël Retornaz, Amos Mosaner, Sebastiano Arman, Mattia Giovanella	(United States) Korey Dropkin, Andrew Stopera, Mark Fenner, Thomas Howell	£20,000
2023	(Scotland) Bruce Mouat, Grant Hardie, Bobby Lammie, Hammy McMillan Jr.	(Scotland) Ross Whyte, Robin Brydone, Duncan McFadzean, Euan Kyle	£20,000
2024	(Scotland) Bruce Mouat, Grant Hardie, Bobby Lammie, Hammy McMillan Jr.	(Scotland) Ross Whyte, Robin Brydone, Duncan McFadzean, Euan Kyle	£20,000
2025	(Scotland) Bruce Mouat, Grant Hardie, Bobby Lammie, Hammy McMillan Jr.	(China) Xu Xiaoming, Fei Xueqing, Li Zhichao, Xu Jingtao	£15,000
2026	(Switzerland) Benoît Schwarz-van Berkel (Fourth), Yannick Schwaller (Skip), Sven Michel, Pablo Lachat-Couchepin	(Scotland) Ross Whyte (Fourth), Grant Hardie (Skip), Craig Waddell, Euan Kyle	£9,500

=== Women's ===
Year	Winning team	Runner up team	Purse (£)
2021	(Scotland) Rebecca Morrison, Lauren Gray, Jennifer Dodds, Mili Smith	(Sweden) Isabella Wranå, Almida de Val, Jennie Wåhlin, Maria Larsson	£6,000
2022	(Germany) Daniela Jentsch, Emira Abbes, Mia Höhne, Analena Jentsch	(Norway) Kristin Skaslien (Fourth), Maia Ramsfjell (Skip), Mille Haslev Nordbye, Martine Rønning	£20,000
2023	(United States) Delaney Strouse, Anne O'Hara, Sydney Mullaney, Rebecca Rodgers	(Italy) Stefania Constantini, Marta Lo Deserto, Angela Romei, Giulia Zardini Lacedelli	£20,000
2024	(Scotland) Fay Henderson, Robyn Munro, Hailey Duff, Katie McMillan	(Italy) Stefania Constantini, Elena Mathis, Marta Lo Deserto, Giulia Zardini Lacedelli	£20,000
2025	(United States) Tabitha Peterson, Cory Thiesse, Tara Peterson, Taylor Anderson-Heide	(Scotland) Rebecca Morrison (Fourth), Jennifer Dodds, Sophie Sinclair, Sophie Jackson (Skip)	£10,000
2026	(Switzerland) Alina Pätz, Selina Witschonke, Stefanie Berset, Renée Frigo	(Switzerland) Xenia Schwaller, Selina Gafner, Fabienne Rieder, Selina Rychiger	£9,500
