= 2024 Euro Super Series =

- Host city: Stirling, Scotland
- Arena: National Curling Academy
- Dates: 21–25 August
- Men's winner: (Scotland) Team Mouat
- Curling club: Curl Edinburgh, Edinburgh
- Skip: Bruce Mouat
- Third: Grant Hardie
- Second: Bobby Lammie
- Lead: Hammy McMillan Jr.
- Coach: Michael Goodfellow
- Finalist: (Scotland) Ross Whyte
- Women's winner: (Scotland) Team Henderson
- Curling club: National Curling Academy, Stirling
- Skip: Fay Henderson
- Third: Robyn Munro
- Second: Hailey Duff
- Lead: Katie McMillan
- Alternate: Lisa Davie
- Coach: Clancy Grandy
- Finalist: (Italy) Stefania Constantini

The 2024 Euro Super Series is a curling event among various countries of Europe. It was held from 21 to 25 August at the National Curling Academy in Stirling, Scotland. The total purse for the event was £ 20,000 on both the men's and women's sides.

In the men's event, a repeat of the 2023 final saw Bruce Mouat defeat Ross Whyte in a close 4–3 game. Mouat and his rink of Grant Hardie, Bobby Lammie and Hammy McMillan Jr. continued their undefeated run to begin the season, having also won the 2024 Baden Masters the week prior. After a 4–0 record in the round robin, Team Mouat defeated the United States' Korey Dropkin 5–3 in the quarterfinals and Switzerland's Michael Brunner 7–5 in the semifinals. Team Whyte also went undefeated in the preliminary round before playoff victories over the Netherlands' Wouter Gösgens and Scotland's Kyle Waddell in the quarter and semifinals respectively. The playoff field was rounded out by Scotland's James Craik and Daniel Casper's U.S. squad.

In the women's event, the reigning Scottish women's champion skip Fay Henderson came out on top with her new squad of Robyn Munro, Hailey Duff, Katie McMillan and Lisa Davie. In the final, her team bested Italy's Stefania Constantini 7–4 to claim the title. After a 2–2 round robin record, Team Henderson scored consecutive playoff victories over the higher ranked United States' Delaney Strouse and Canada's Kayla MacMillan rinks to reach the final. Constantini, who also finished runner-up in 2023, went 3–1 in the group stage before defeating the United States' Elizabeth Cousins 5–2 in the quarterfinals and Scotland's Rebecca Morrison 6–5 in the semifinals.

== Men ==
=== Teams ===
The teams are listed as follows:

Skip	Third	Second	Lead	Alternate	Locale
Michael Brunner	Anthony Petoud	Romano Meier	Andreas Gerlach		Bern, Switzerland
Cameron Bryce	Duncan Menzies	Luke Carson	Robin McCall		Kelso, Scotland
Orrin Carson	Logan Carson	Archie Hyslop	Charlie Gibb		Stirling, Scotland
Daniel Casper	Luc Violette	Ben Richardson	Aidan Oldenburg		(United States) Chaska, Minnesota
Jordan Chandler	Landan Rooney	Connor Lawes	Robert Currie	Evan Lilly	(Canada) Little Current, Ontario
James Craik	Mark Watt	Angus Bryce	Blair Haswell		Forfar, Scotland
Korey Dropkin	Andrew Stopera	Mark Fenner	Thomas Howell		(United States) Duluth, Minnesota
Wouter Gösgens	Laurens Hoekman	Simon Spits (Note: Simon Spits spared for Jaap van Dorp.)	Alexander Magan		Zoetermeer, Netherlands
Andreas Hårstad	Mathias Brænden	Michael Mellemseter	Willhelm Næss	Emil M. Kvål	Oppdal, Norway
Mike McEwen	Colton Flasch	Kevin Marsh	Dan Marsh		(Canada) Saskatoon, Saskatchewan
Bruce Mouat	Grant Hardie	Bobby Lammie	Hammy McMillan Jr.		Edinburgh, Scotland
Magnus Ramsfjell	Martin Sesaker	Bendik Ramsfjell	Gaute Nepstad		Trondheim, Norway
Yves Stocker	Kim Schwaller	Felix Eberhard	Tom Winkelhausen		Zug, Switzerland
Kyle Waddell	Craig Waddell	Mark Taylor	Gavin Barr		Hamilton, Scotland
Ross Whyte	Robin Brydone	Duncan McFadzean	Euan Kyle		Stirling, Scotland

=== Round robin standings ===
Final Round Robin Standings

Key
Teams to Playoffs

Pool A	W	L	PF	PA
(Scotland) Bruce Mouat	4	0	26	13
(United States) Daniel Casper	3	1	22	16
(Switzerland) Michael Brunner	2	2	20	15
(Norway) Magnus Ramsfjell	1	3	20	23
(Scotland) Orrin Carson	0	4	12	33

Pool B	W	L	PF	PA
(Scotland) Ross Whyte	4	0	26	9
(United States) Korey Dropkin	2	2	14	20
(Scotland) Cameron Bryce	2	2	22	19
(Switzerland) Yves Stocker	2	2	21	17
(Canada) Jordan Chandler	0	4	7	25

Pool C	W	L	PF	PA
(Scotland) James Craik	3	1	25	14
(Scotland) Kyle Waddell	3	1	23	15
(Netherlands) Wouter Gösgens	2	2	23	25
(Norway) Andreas Hårstad	1	3	17	26
(Canada) Mike McEwen	1	3	16	24

=== Round robin results ===
All draw times are listed in British Summer Time (UTC+01:00).

==== Draw 1 ====
Wednesday, 21 August, 12:30 pm

Sheet B	1	2	3	4	5	6	7	8	Final
(Norway) Magnus Ramsfjell	0	1	0	0	0	1	0	X	2
(Switzerland) Michael Brunner	1	0	1	0	2	0	1	X	5

Sheet C	1	2	3	4	5	6	7	8	Final
(Scotland) Bruce Mouat	1	0	0	0	2	0	2	0	5
(United States) Daniel Casper	0	0	0	1	0	1	0	1	3

==== Draw 2 ====
Wednesday, 21 August, 4:30 pm

Sheet A	1	2	3	4	5	6	7	8	Final
(United States) Korey Dropkin	2	0	0	1	0	0	0	1	4
(Canada) Jordan Chandler	0	0	2	0	0	0	0	0	2

Sheet B	1	2	3	4	5	6	7	8	Final
(Scotland) James Craik	1	3	0	1	0	1	1	X	7
(Canada) Mike McEwen	0	0	1	0	1	0	0	X	2

Sheet C	1	2	3	4	5	6	7	8	Final
(Scotland) Kyle Waddell	0	0	1	0	0	3	0	0	4
(Netherlands) Wouter Gösgens	2	1	0	1	1	0	0	1	6

Sheet D	1	2	3	4	5	6	7	8	Final
(Switzerland) Yves Stocker	0	0	1	0	0	1	0	X	2
(Scotland) Ross Whyte	2	1	0	1	1	0	2	X	7

==== Draw 4 ====
Thursday, 22 August, 8:30 am

Sheet A	1	2	3	4	5	6	7	8	Final
(Switzerland) Michael Brunner	1	3	0	6	X	X	X	X	10
(Scotland) Orrin Carson	0	0	1	0	X	X	X	X	1

Sheet B	1	2	3	4	5	6	7	8	Final
(Scotland) Ross Whyte	0	2	0	0	2	0	2	X	6
(United States) Korey Dropkin	0	0	1	0	0	2	0	X	3

Sheet C	1	2	3	4	5	6	7	8	Final
(Scotland) Cameron Bryce	0	1	0	1	0	2	0	0	4
(Switzerland) Yves Stocker	1	0	1	0	2	0	3	1	8

Sheet D	1	2	3	4	5	6	7	8	Final
(United States) Daniel Casper	0	4	0	0	0	2	0	2	8
(Norway) Magnus Ramsfjell	1	0	1	1	2	0	1	0	6

==== Draw 5 ====
Thursday, 22 August, 12:30 pm

Sheet A	1	2	3	4	5	6	7	8	Final
(Canada) Mike McEwen	0	2	0	1	0	0	0	X	3
(Norway) Andreas Hårstad	2	0	2	0	1	1	2	X	8

Sheet D	1	2	3	4	5	6	7	8	Final
(Netherlands) Wouter Gösgens	0	1	0	1	0	2	0	X	4
(Scotland) James Craik	2	0	1	0	1	0	4	X	8

==== Draw 6 ====
Thursday, 22 August, 4:30 pm

Sheet A	1	2	3	4	5	6	7	8	Final
(Norway) Magnus Ramsfjell	1	0	0	1	0	0	2	0	4
(Scotland) Bruce Mouat	0	2	1	0	1	0	0	1	5

Sheet B	1	2	3	4	5	6	7	8	Final
(Scotland) Orrin Carson	0	0	0	2	0	0	1	X	3
(United States) Daniel Casper	0	0	2	0	2	1	0	X	5

==== Draw 7 ====
Thursday, 22 August, 8:30 pm

Sheet A	1	2	3	4	5	6	7	8	Final
(Scotland) James Craik	0	1	0	1	0	2	0	0	4
(Scotland) Kyle Waddell	0	0	2	0	1	0	2	1	6

Sheet B	1	2	3	4	5	6	7	8	Final
(Norway) Andreas Hårstad	0	1	0	2	0	2	0	X	5
(Netherlands) Wouter Gösgens	4	0	0	0	2	0	3	X	9

Sheet C	1	2	3	4	5	6	7	8	Final
(Canada) Jordan Chandler	0	0	0	1	0	X	X	X	1
(Scotland) Ross Whyte	4	1	1	0	1	X	X	X	7

Sheet D	1	2	3	4	5	6	7	8	Final
(United States) Korey Dropkin	0	1	0	1	0	X	X	X	2
(Scotland) Cameron Bryce	3	0	3	0	2	X	X	X	8

==== Draw 9 ====
Friday, 23 August, 12:30 pm

Sheet A	1	2	3	4	5	6	7	8	9	Final
(Switzerland) Yves Stocker	0	0	1	0	2	0	0	1	0	4
(United States) Korey Dropkin	0	0	0	3	0	1	0	0	1	5

Sheet B	1	2	3	4	5	6	7	8	Final
(Scotland) Cameron Bryce	1	0	0	2	0	2	0	2	7
(Canada) Jordan Chandler	0	1	1	0	1	0	0	0	3

Sheet C	1	2	3	4	5	6	7	8	Final
(United States) Daniel Casper	1	0	2	0	2	1	X	X	6
(Switzerland) Michael Brunner	0	1	0	1	0	0	X	X	2

Sheet D	1	2	3	4	5	6	7	8	Final
(Scotland) Bruce Mouat	0	3	3	0	4	X	X	X	10
(Scotland) Orrin Carson	2	0	0	1	0	X	X	X	3

==== Draw 10 ====
Friday, 23 August, 4:30 pm

Sheet C	1	2	3	4	5	6	7	8	Final
(Netherlands) Wouter Gösgens	0	0	2	0	0	2	0	X	4
(Canada) Mike McEwen	0	2	0	2	2	0	2	X	8

Sheet D	1	2	3	4	5	6	7	8	Final
(Scotland) Kyle Waddell	3	0	3	0	1	1	X	X	8
(Norway) Andreas Hårstad	0	1	0	1	0	0	X	X	2

==== Draw 11 ====
Friday, 23 August, 8:30 pm

Sheet B	1	2	3	4	5	6	7	8	Final
(Switzerland) Michael Brunner	0	0	0	1	0	1	1	0	3
(Scotland) Bruce Mouat	1	0	1	0	2	0	0	2	6

Sheet C	1	2	3	4	5	6	7	8	Final
(Scotland) Orrin Carson	0	0	3	1	0	0	1	X	5
(Norway) Magnus Ramsfjell	0	2	0	0	5	1	0	X	8

==== Draw 12 ====
Saturday, 24 August, 8:30 am

Sheet A	1	2	3	4	5	6	7	8	Final
(Scotland) Ross Whyte	2	0	0	0	0	4	0	X	6
(Scotland) Cameron Bryce	0	1	0	1	0	0	1	X	3

Sheet B	1	2	3	4	5	6	7	8	Final
(Canada) Mike McEwen	0	0	1	0	2	0	0	X	3
(Scotland) Kyle Waddell	0	0	0	2	0	2	1	X	5

Sheet C	1	2	3	4	5	6	7	8	Final
(Norway) Andreas Hårstad	0	1	0	0	0	1	X	X	2
(Scotland) James Craik	2	0	0	2	2	0	X	X	6

Sheet D	1	2	3	4	5	6	7	8	Final
(Canada) Jordan Chandler	0	1	0	0	0	X	X	X	1
(Switzerland) Yves Stocker	3	0	0	2	2	X	X	X	7

=== Playoffs ===
Quarterfinals
1	(Scotland) Ross Whyte	8
8	(Netherlands) Wouter Gösgens	4
4	(United States) Daniel Casper	3
5	(Scotland) Kyle Waddell	6
2	(Scotland) Bruce Mouat	5
7	(United States) Korey Dropkin	3
3	(Scotland) James Craik	4
6	(Switzerland) Michael Brunner	9

Semifinals
1	(Scotland) Ross Whyte	9
5	(Scotland) Kyle Waddell	3
2	(Scotland) Bruce Mouat	7
6	(Switzerland) Michael Brunner	5

Final
1	(Scotland) Ross Whyte	3
2	(Scotland) Bruce Mouat	4

==== Quarterfinals ====
Saturday, 24 August, 4:30 pm

Sheet A	1	2	3	4	5	6	7	8	Final
(Scotland) James Craik	1	0	0	1	0	2	0	X	4
(Switzerland) Michael Brunner	0	1	2	0	2	0	4	X	9

Sheet B	1	2	3	4	5	6	7	8	Final
(Scotland) Ross Whyte	3	0	0	0	2	0	2	1	8
(Netherlands) Wouter Gösgens	0	1	0	0	0	3	0	0	4

Sheet C	1	2	3	4	5	6	7	8	Final
(Scotland) Bruce Mouat	2	0	0	2	0	0	0	1	5
(United States) Korey Dropkin	0	0	1	0	0	1	1	0	3

Sheet D	1	2	3	4	5	6	7	8	Final
(United States) Daniel Casper	1	0	0	0	1	1	0	X	3
(Scotland) Kyle Waddell	0	2	1	1	0	0	2	X	6

==== Semifinals ====
Sunday, 25 August, 8:30 am

Sheet C	1	2	3	4	5	6	7	8	Final
(Scotland) Ross Whyte	2	0	3	0	4	X	X	X	9
(Scotland) Kyle Waddell	0	1	0	2	0	X	X	X	3

Sheet D	1	2	3	4	5	6	7	8	Final
(Scotland) Bruce Mouat	1	0	2	0	2	0	2	X	7
(Switzerland) Michael Brunner	0	1	0	3	0	1	0	X	5

==== Final ====
Sunday, 25 August, 12:30 pm

Sheet B	1	2	3	4	5	6	7	8	Final
(Scotland) Ross Whyte	0	0	0	1	0	0	2	0	3
(Scotland) Bruce Mouat	0	0	1	0	1	1	0	1	4

== Women ==
=== Teams ===
The teams are listed as follows:

Skip	Third	Second	Lead	Alternate	Locale
Stefania Constantini	Elena Mathis	Marta Lo Deserto	Giulia Zardini Lacedelli	Angela Romei	Cortina d'Ampezzo, Italy
Elizabeth Cousins	Annmarie Dubberstein	Allison Howell	Elizabeth Janiak		(United States) Nashua, New Hampshire
Moa Dryburgh	Thea Orefjord	Moa Tjärnlund	Moa Nilsson	Maja Roxin	Sundbyberg, Sweden
Fay Henderson	Robyn Munro	Hailey Duff	Katie McMillan	Lisa Davie	Stirling, Scotland
Tia Laurie	Cara Davidson	Kirsty Gallacher	Holly Burke		Stirling, Scotland
Kayla MacMillan	Sarah Daniels	Lindsay Dubue	Sarah Loken		(Canada) Victoria, British Columbia
Rebecca Morrison (Fourth)	Jennifer Dodds	Sophie Sinclair	Sophie Jackson (Skip) (Note: Sophie Jackson skipped Team Morrison.)		Stirling, Scotland
Teresa Treichl (Fourth)	Verena Pflügler (Skip)	Astrid Pflügler	Emma Müller	Hannah Wittibschlaeger	Kitzbühel, Austria
Delaney Strouse	Sarah Anderson	Sydney Mullaney	Anne O'Hara		(United States) Traverse City, Michigan
Laura Watt	Amy Mitchell	Holly Wilkie-Milne	Robyn Mitchell	Tamzin Smith	Stirling, Scotland

=== Round robin standings ===
Final Round Robin Standings

Key
Teams to Playoffs

Pool A	W	L	PF	PA
(Scotland) Team Morrison	4	0	23	8
(United States) Delaney Strouse	3	1	26	10
(United States) Elizabeth Cousins	2	2	18	24
(Sweden) Moa Dryburgh	1	3	16	24
(Scotland) Tia Laurie	0	4	10	27

Pool B	W	L	PF	PA
(Canada) Kayla MacMillan	4	0	30	13
(Italy) Stefania Constantini	3	1	27	21
(Scotland) Fay Henderson	2	2	19	23
(Scotland) Laura Watt	1	3	20	18
(Austria) Verena Pflügler	0	4	12	33

=== Round robin results ===
All draw times are listed in British Summer Time (UTC+01:00).

==== Draw 3 ====
Wednesday, 21 August, 8:30 pm

Sheet A	1	2	3	4	5	6	7	8	Final
(United States) Elizabeth Cousins	0	0	0	1	0	0	0	X	1
(United States) Delaney Strouse	2	1	2	0	0	1	2	X	8

Sheet B	1	2	3	4	5	6	7	8	Final
(Sweden) Moa Dryburgh	0	0	0	0	1	0	0	X	1
(Scotland) Team Morrison	2	1	1	1	0	1	1	X	7

Sheet C	1	2	3	4	5	6	7	8	Final
(Canada) Kayla MacMillan	0	5	0	1	0	1	2	X	9
(Austria) Verena Pflügler	1	0	2	0	0	0	0	X	3

Sheet D	1	2	3	4	5	6	7	8	Final
(Scotland) Laura Watt	0	1	0	0	1	0	2	0	4
(Italy) Stefania Constantini	2	0	0	2	0	0	0	2	6

==== Draw 5 ====
Thursday, 22 August, 12:30 pm

Sheet B	1	2	3	4	5	6	7	8	Final
(Scotland) Team Morrison	0	1	1	1	0	2	0	X	5
(United States) Elizabeth Cousins	0	0	0	0	1	0	1	X	2

Sheet C	1	2	3	4	5	6	7	8	Final
(Scotland) Tia Laurie	0	1	0	0	1	0	1	X	3
(Sweden) Moa Dryburgh	1	0	0	3	0	2	0	X	6

==== Draw 6 ====
Thursday, 22 August, 4:30 pm

Sheet C	1	2	3	4	5	6	7	8	Final
(Italy) Stefania Constantini	0	0	0	1	0	2	1	X	4
(Canada) Kayla MacMillan	2	2	2	0	1	0	0	X	7

Sheet D	1	2	3	4	5	6	7	8	Final
(Scotland) Fay Henderson	2	0	0	0	1	2	0	X	5
(Scotland) Laura Watt	0	1	0	0	0	0	1	X	2

==== Draw 8 ====
Friday, 23 August, 8:30 am

Sheet A	1	2	3	4	5	6	7	8	Final
(Austria) Verena Pflügler	0	1	0	0	0	2	1	0	4
(Italy) Stefania Constantini	1	0	2	2	1	0	0	2	8

Sheet B	1	2	3	4	5	6	7	8	Final
(Canada) Kayla MacMillan	1	3	0	1	2	1	X	X	8
(Scotland) Fay Henderson	0	0	1	0	0	0	X	X	1

Sheet C	1	2	3	4	5	6	7	8	Final
(United States) Delaney Strouse	0	2	0	0	0	1	0	X	3
(Scotland) Team Morrison	0	0	3	0	1	0	2	X	6

Sheet D	1	2	3	4	5	6	7	8	Final
(United States) Elizabeth Cousins	2	0	0	0	2	0	3	X	7
(Scotland) Tia Laurie	0	0	2	0	0	2	0	X	4

==== Draw 10 ====
Friday, 23 August, 4:30 pm

Sheet A	1	2	3	4	5	6	7	8	Final
(Sweden) Moa Dryburgh	2	2	0	0	1	0	2	0	7
(United States) Elizabeth Cousins	0	0	3	2	0	2	0	1	8

Sheet B	1	2	3	4	5	6	7	8	Final
(Scotland) Tia Laurie	0	1	0	0	X	X	X	X	1
(United States) Delaney Strouse	2	0	0	7	X	X	X	X	9

==== Draw 11 ====
Friday, 23 August, 8:30 pm

Sheet A	1	2	3	4	5	6	7	8	Final
(Scotland) Laura Watt	1	0	3	0	1	0	0	0	5
(Canada) Kayla MacMillan	0	1	0	2	0	1	1	1	6

Sheet D	1	2	3	4	5	6	7	8	Final
(Scotland) Fay Henderson	3	0	0	1	2	1	0	X	7
(Austria) Verena Pflügler	0	0	2	0	0	0	2	X	4

==== Draw 13 ====
Saturday, 24 August, 12:30 pm

Sheet A	1	2	3	4	5	6	7	8	Final
(Scotland) Team Morrison	1	0	2	0	1	1	0	X	5
(Scotland) Tia Laurie	0	1	0	1	0	0	0	X	2

Sheet B	1	2	3	4	5	6	7	8	Final
(Italy) Stefania Constantini	2	0	2	1	0	2	0	2	9
(Scotland) Fay Henderson	0	1	0	0	2	0	3	0	6

Sheet C	1	2	3	4	5	6	7	8	Final
(Austria) Verena Pflügler	0	0	1	0	0	X	X	X	1
(Scotland) Laura Watt	3	1	0	3	2	X	X	X	9

Sheet D	1	2	3	4	5	6	7	8	Final
(United States) Delaney Strouse	1	0	0	0	2	1	2	X	6
(Sweden) Moa Dryburgh	0	1	1	0	0	0	0	X	2

=== Playoffs ===
Quarterfinals
B2	(Italy) Stefania Constantini	5
A3	(United States) Elizabeth Cousins	2
A2	(United States) Delaney Strouse	5
B3	(Scotland) Fay Henderson	6

Semifinals
A1	(Scotland) Team Morrison	5
B2	(Italy) Stefania Constantini	6
B1	(Canada) Kayla MacMillan	6
B3	(Scotland) Fay Henderson	8

Final
B2	(Italy) Stefania Constantini	4
B3	(Scotland) Fay Henderson	7

==== Quarterfinals ====
Saturday, 24 August, 8:30 pm

Sheet B	1	2	3	4	5	6	7	8	Final
(United States) Delaney Strouse	0	1	2	0	1	0	1	0	5
(Scotland) Fay Henderson	1	0	0	2	0	1	0	2	6

Sheet D	1	2	3	4	5	6	7	8	Final
(Italy) Stefania Constantini	2	1	0	1	0	0	1	X	5
(United States) Elizabeth Cousins	0	0	1	0	1	0	0	X	2

==== Semifinals ====
Sunday, 25 August, 8:30 am

Sheet A	1	2	3	4	5	6	7	8	9	Final
(Canada) Kayla MacMillan	1	0	0	2	0	3	0	0	0	6
(Scotland) Fay Henderson	0	1	0	0	2	0	1	2	2	8

Sheet B	1	2	3	4	5	6	7	8	Final
(Scotland) Team Morrison	0	2	0	0	1	0	2	X	5
(Italy) Stefania Constantini	2	0	1	1	0	2	0	X	6

==== Final ====
Sunday, 25 August, 12:30 pm

Sheet C	1	2	3	4	5	6	7	8	Final
(Italy) Stefania Constantini	1	0	0	2	0	0	1	X	4
(Scotland) Fay Henderson	0	1	3	0	1	2	0	X	7
