= Elena Dami =

Italian curler

- Curler
- Born: 4 January 1999 (age 27); Rivoli, Italy

Team
- Curling club: Virtus Piemonte Ghiaccio ASD, Pinerolo, ITA

Curling career
- Member Association: Italy
- World Championship: 1 (2021)
- European Championship: 3 (2018, 2019, 2021)

Elena Dami (born 4 January 1999) is an Italian curler from Buttigliera, Italy.

== Career ==
Dami joined the Italian National Women's Curling Team, skipped by Veronica Zappone, for the 2018–19 season. The team represented Italy at the 2018 European Curling Championships where they finished in last place with a 2–7 record. Later that season, she played lead on the Italian junior team that represented Italy at the 2019 Winter Universiade. There, the team once again finished in last with a 2–7 record.

The next season, Dami aged out of juniors and was moved to alternate on the Italian National Team. The team competed in the 2019 European Curling Championships B Division after being relegated due to their 2018 performance. After finishing second in the round robin, they defeated Hungary in the semifinals and Turkey in the final to claim the B Division title. This earned them a spot at the 2020 World Qualification Event for the chance to qualify Italy for the 2020 World Women's Curling Championship. At the Qualification Event, they finished second in the round robin with a 6–1 record. They then lost to Korea in the first qualification game before bouncing back to defeat Turkey in the second place game to claim the thirteenth and final spot at the World Women's Championship. The Worlds were cancelled due to the COVID-19 pandemic. The team represented Italy at the 2021 World Women's Curling Championship. The Italian team was originally not supposed to compete in the 2021 championship, but due to the cancellation of qualification events as well as the change in the Olympic Qualification Process, they were added as the fourteenth team. At the World Championships, the team finished in thirteenth place with a 2–11 record, their wins coming against Estonia and Germany.

At the 2021 European Curling Championships in Lillehammer, Norway, the Italian team finished with a 4–5 round robin record. This placed them sixth in the group, which was good enough to earn Italy a spot in the 2022 World Women's Curling Championship. In the sixth round robin draw, the team defeated Scotland's Eve Muirhead 8–7, being the only team to defeat the Scottish side as they went on to win the gold medal in the playoff round. In December 2021, the team traveled to Leeuwarden, Netherlands to compete in the 2021 Olympic Qualification Event, hoping to secure Italy a spot in the women's event at the Beijing Olympics. After eight draws, the Italian team sat in fourth place in the standings with a 4–3 record. They faced Muirhead's British side in their final round robin draw, with the chance to secure the fourth playoff spot. The team, however, would lose 8–1 to Team Muirhead, meaning Latvia earned the last playoff spot instead of them. After the Olympic Qualification Event, Dami was replaced by Veronica Zappone on the women's team.

== Personal life ==
Dami is currently a student.

== Teams ==
Season	Skip	Third	Second	Lead	Alternate
2015–16	Elena Dami (Fourth)	Marta Benedetto	Chiara Bertinetti	Elisa Marten Perolino (Skip)	
2017–18	Elena Dami	Marta Benedetto	Chiara Bertinetti	Elisa Dami	
2018–19	Veronica Zappone	Stefania Constantini	Angela Romei	Elena Dami	Federica Ghedini
2018–19	Stefania Constantini	Angela Romei	Marta Benedetto	Elena Dami	Elisa Marten Perolino
2019–20	Veronica Zappone	Stefania Constantini	Angela Romei	Giulia Zardini Lacedelli	Elena Dami
2020–21	Stefania Constantini	Marta Lo Deserto	Angela Romei	Giulia Zardini Lacedelli	Elena Dami
2021–22	Stefania Constantini	Marta Lo Deserto	Angela Romei	Giulia Zardini Lacedelli	Elena Dami
