= Veronica Zappone =

Italian curler

- Curler
- Born: 11 April 1993 (age 33); Segrate

Team
- Curling club: 3S Sys-tek, Pinerolo, ITA
- Skip: Veronica Zappone
- Third: Rebecca Mariani
- Second: Lucrezia Grande
- Lead: Camilla Gilberti

Curling career
- Member Association: Italy
- World Championship: 3 (2017, 2018, 2022)
- World Mixed Doubles Championship: 2 (2017, 2018)
- European Championship: 5 (2013, 2014, 2017, 2018, 2019)
Medal record
Women's curling
Representing Italy
European Championships
Bronze medal – third place	2017 St Gallen

Veronica Zappone (born 11 April 1993 in Italy) is an Italian curler from Volvera. She started curling in 2005.

== Personal life ==
As of 2022, Zappone is a law student.
