= 2025 United States Pan Continental Qualifier =

- Host city: Chaska, Minnesota
- Arena: Chaska Curling Center
- Dates: August 8–10
- Men's winner: (Minnesota) Team Shuster
- Curling club: Duluth CC, Duluth
- Skip: John Shuster
- Third: Chris Plys
- Second: Colin Hufman
- Lead: Matt Hamilton
- Coach: Theran Michaelis
- Finalist: (Minnesota) Korey Dropkin
- Women's winner: (Minnesota) Team Peterson
- Curling club: St. Paul CC, Saint Paul
- Skip: Tabitha Peterson
- Third: Cory Thiesse
- Second: Tara Peterson
- Lead: Taylor Anderson-Heide
- Coach: Cathy Overton-Clapham
- Finalist: (Michigan) Team Strouse

The 2025 United States Pan Continental Qualifier was held from August 8 to 10 at the Chaska Curling Center in Chaska, Minnesota. The winning teams earned the right to represent the United States at the 2025 Pan Continental Curling Championships in Virginia, Minnesota, attempting to qualify the U.S. for the 2026 World Curling Championships. Both the men's and women's events were held in a double round robin format.

== Men ==
=== Teams ===
The teams are listed as follows:

Skip	Third	Second	Lead	Alternate	Locale
Daniel Casper	Luc Violette	Ben Richardson	Aidan Oldenburg	Rich Ruohonen	Chaska, Minnesota
Korey Dropkin	Thomas Howell	Andrew Stopera	Mark Fenner		Duluth, Minnesota
John Shuster	Chris Plys	Colin Hufman	Matt Hamilton		Duluth, Minnesota

=== Round robin standings ===
Final Round Robin Standings

Key
Team to 2025 Pan Continental Curling Championships

Team	W	L	W–L	PF	PA	EW	EL	BE	SE
(Minnesota) John Shuster	4	0	–	25	14	15	11	0	5
(Minnesota) Korey Dropkin	2	2	–	20	16	11	12	3	3
(Minnesota) Daniel Casper	0	4	–	13	28	11	14	2	2

Round Robin Summary Table
Pos.	Team	(Minnesota) Casper		(Minnesota) Dropkin		(Minnesota) Shuster		Record
Pos.	Team	1st	2nd	1st	2nd	1st	2nd	Record
3	(Minnesota) Daniel Casper	—N/a		2–7	3–7	4–6	4–8	0–4
2	(Minnesota) Korey Dropkin	7–2	7–3	—N/a		4–8	2–3	2–2
1	(Minnesota) John Shuster	6–4	8–4	8–4	3–2	—N/a		4–0

=== Round robin results ===
All draw times are listed in Central Time (UTC−05:00).

==== Draw 1 ====
Friday, August 8, 9:00 am

Sheet 1	1	2	3	4	5	6	7	8	Final
(Minnesota) Korey Dropkin 🔨	1	0	1	0	2	0	0	X	4
(Minnesota) John Shuster	0	4	0	1	0	2	1	X	8

==== Draw 2 ====
Friday, August 8, 2:00 pm

Sheet 2	1	2	3	4	5	6	7	8	Final
(Minnesota) Korey Dropkin 🔨	1	0	2	4	0	X	X	X	7
(Minnesota) Daniel Casper	0	1	0	0	1	X	X	X	2

==== Draw 3 ====
Friday, August 8, 7:00 pm

Sheet 1	1	2	3	4	5	6	7	8	Final
(Minnesota) John Shuster	0	1	0	2	0	1	0	2	6
(Minnesota) Daniel Casper 🔨	1	0	2	0	0	0	1	0	4

==== Draw 4 ====
Saturday, August 9, 9:00 am

Sheet 2	1	2	3	4	5	6	7	8	Final
(Minnesota) John Shuster	0	1	0	0	1	0	0	1	3
(Minnesota) Korey Dropkin 🔨	0	0	0	0	0	1	1	0	2

==== Draw 5 ====
Saturday, August 9, 2:00 pm

Sheet 1	1	2	3	4	5	6	7	8	Final
(Minnesota) Daniel Casper	1	1	0	0	0	1	0	X	3
(Minnesota) Korey Dropkin 🔨	0	0	1	1	0	0	5	X	7

==== Draw 6 ====
Saturday, August 9, 7:00 pm

Sheet 2	1	2	3	4	5	6	7	8	Final
(Minnesota) Daniel Casper 🔨	1	0	1	0	2	0	0	X	4
(Minnesota) John Shuster	0	1	0	1	0	4	2	X	8

== Women ==
=== Teams ===
The teams are listed as follows:

Skip	Third	Second	Lead	Locale
Elizabeth Cousins	Annmarie Dubberstein	Allison Howell	Elizabeth Janiak	Nashua, New Hampshire
Tabitha Peterson	Cory Thiesse	Tara Peterson	Taylor Anderson-Heide	Saint Paul, Minnesota
Delaney Strouse (Fourth)	Anne O'Hara	Sydney Mullaney	Madison Bear (Skip)	Traverse City, Michigan

=== Round robin standings ===
Final Round Robin Standings

Key
Teams to Final
Teams to Tiebreaker

Team	W	L	W–L	PF	PA	EW	EL	BE	SE
(Minnesota) Tabitha Peterson	2	2	–	23	16	15	12	1	7
(Michigan) Team Strouse	2	2	–	18	21	13	15	1	2
(New Hampshire) Elizabeth Cousins	2	2	–	17	21	14	15	0	5

Round Robin Summary Table
Pos.	Team	(New Hampshire) Cousins		(Minnesota) Peterson		(Michigan) Strouse		Record
Pos.	Team	1st	2nd	1st	2nd	1st	2nd	Record
1	(New Hampshire) Elizabeth Cousins	—N/a		6–4	2–7	6–5	3–5	2–2
2	(Minnesota) Tabitha Peterson	4–6	7–2	—N/a		4–7	8–1	2–2
3	(Michigan) Team Strouse	5–6	5–3	7–4	1–8	—N/a		2–2

=== Round robin results ===
All draw times are listed in Central Time (UTC−05:00).

==== Draw 1 ====
Friday, August 8, 9:00 am

Sheet 2	1	2	3	4	5	6	7	8	Final
(Minnesota) Tabitha Peterson 🔨	1	0	1	0	0	1	1	0	4
(Michigan) Team Strouse	0	2	0	1	3	0	0	1	7

==== Draw 2 ====
Friday, August 8, 2:00 pm

Sheet 1	1	2	3	4	5	6	7	8	Final
(Minnesota) Tabitha Peterson 🔨	0	2	1	1	0	0	0	0	4
(New Hampshire) Elizabeth Cousins	1	0	0	0	1	1	2	1	6

==== Draw 3 ====
Friday, August 8, 7:00 pm

Sheet 2	1	2	3	4	5	6	7	8	Final
(Michigan) Team Strouse	0	2	0	1	0	1	0	1	5
(New Hampshire) Elizabeth Cousins 🔨	1	0	1	0	2	0	2	0	6

==== Draw 4 ====
Saturday, August 9, 9:00 am

Sheet 1	1	2	3	4	5	6	7	8	Final
(Michigan) Team Strouse	0	0	0	0	1	0	X	X	1
(Minnesota) Tabitha Peterson 🔨	0	2	2	3	0	1	X	X	8

==== Draw 5 ====
Saturday, August 9, 2:00 pm

Sheet 2	1	2	3	4	5	6	7	8	Final
(New Hampshire) Elizabeth Cousins 🔨	0	1	0	0	1	0	X	X	2
(Minnesota) Tabitha Peterson	3	0	2	1	0	1	X	X	7

==== Draw 6 ====
Saturday, August 9, 7:00 pm

Sheet 1	1	2	3	4	5	6	7	8	Final
(New Hampshire) Elizabeth Cousins	0	0	1	0	0	1	1	0	3
(Michigan) Team Strouse 🔨	0	1	0	2	1	0	0	1	5

=== Tiebreaker ===
Sunday, August 10, 10:00 am

Sheet 1	1	2	3	4	5	6	7	8	Final
(Michigan) Team Strouse 🔨	1	0	0	2	1	0	0	2	6
(New Hampshire) Elizabeth Cousins	0	1	1	0	0	1	0	0	3

=== Final ===
Sunday, August 10, 1:30 pm

Sheet 2	1	2	3	4	5	6	7	8	Final
(Minnesota) Tabitha Peterson 🔨	0	1	1	1	0	2	0	1	6
(Michigan) Team Strouse	0	0	0	0	1	0	2	0	3
