= Giulia Zardini Lacedelli =

Italian curler (born 2003)

- Curler
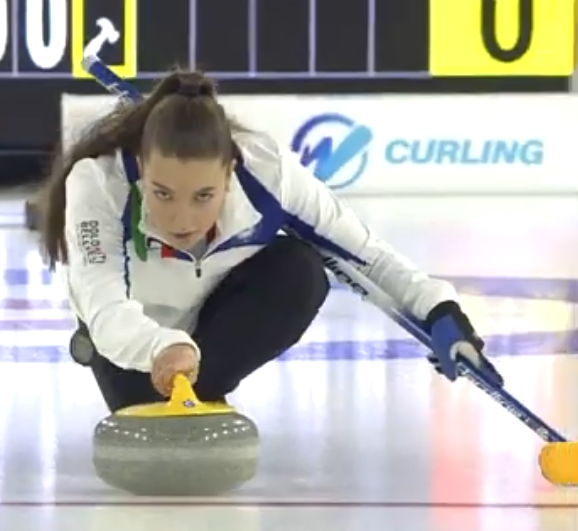
- At the 2025 Winter World University Games
- Born: 29 January 2003 (age 23); Pieve di Cadore, Italy

Team
- Curling club: CC Dolomiti, Cortina d'Ampezzo, ITA
- Skip: Giulia Zardini Lacedelli
- Third: Elena Mathis
- Second: Marta Lo Deserto
- Lead: Rachele Scalesse
- Mixed doubles partner: Francesco De Zanna

Curling career
- Member Association: Italy
- World Championship: 6 (2021, 2022, 2023, 2024, 2025, 2026)
- European Championship: 7 (2019, 2021, 2022, 2023, 2024, 2025, 2026)
- Olympic: 1 (2026)
Medal record
Women's curling
Representing Italy
European Championships
Silver medal – second place	2023 Aberdeen

Giulia Zardini Lacedelli (born 29 January 2003 in Pieve di Cadore) is an Italian curler from Cortina d'Ampezzo. She currently skips her own team out of the Curling Club Dolomiti in Cortina d'Ampezzo.

== Career ==
=== Women's ===
As a member of the Italian junior team skipped by Stefania Constantini, Zardini Lacedelli competed in three World Junior-B Curling Championships for Italy through 2018 and 2019. The team never qualified for the World Junior Curling Championships, however, losing in the quarterfinals in both 2018 and 2019.

Zardini Lacedelli was added to the Italian women's team, skipped by Veronica Zappone, for the 2019–20 season. As the previous Italian team was relegated to the B Division of the 2019 European Curling Championships due to their results in 2018, they would need to finish in the top two to promote themselves back into the A Division and earn a spot in the 2020 World Qualification Event. Through the round robin, the team suffered two defeats en route to a second-place finish in the group, only behind Turkey's Dilşat Yıldız who handed the Italian's one of their two losses. Team Zappone faced Hungary's Dorottya Palancsa in the semifinal and won the game 9–4, earning themselves a spot in the final where they would go against the Turkish side. The Italian's opened up a comfortable lead through the first five ends, which they rode to a 5–2 victory over Turkey and a gold medal in the B Division. Their win secured their spot in the World Qualification Event in January 2020, where two countries would qualify for the 2020 World Women's Curling Championship. The team finished 6–1 through the round robin, only losing to the unbeaten South Korean team of Gim Un-chi. They then faced Gim's rink in the first qualification game, where South Korea made a comeback in the second half of the game to beat the Italians 6–5. They then faced Yıldız's Turkish rink in the second qualification game for the final spot in the World Championship, which they won 8–4. Unfortunately, the World Championship was cancelled due to the COVID-19 pandemic.

Due to the pandemic, the European Curling Championships were canceled. As a result, the field for the 2021 World Women's Curling Championship was expanded to fourteen teams as many countries did not have the opportunity to qualify for the Championship. Based on their success at the 2020 World Qualification Event, the Italian women's team earned the fourteenth and final spot in the championship. Following the departure of Veronica Zappone, Stefania Constantini moved up to skip the Italian team which also included third Marta Lo Deserto, second Angela Romei, Zardini Lacedelli at lead and alternate Elena Dami. The team finished in thirteenth place at the Championship with a 2–11 record, defeating Estonia's Marie Turmann and Germany's Daniela Jentsch.

At the 2021 European Curling Championships in Lillehammer, Norway, the Italian team posted a 4–5 round robin record. This placed them sixth in the group, which was good enough to earn Italy a spot in the 2022 World Women's Curling Championship. In the sixth round robin draw, the team defeated Scotland's Eve Muirhead 8–7, being the only team to defeat the Scottish side as they went on to win the gold medal in the playoff round. In December 2021, the team travelled to Leeuwarden, Netherlands to compete in the 2021 Olympic Qualification Event, hoping to secure Italy a spot in the women's event at the Beijing Olympics. After eight draws, the Italian team sat in fourth place in the standings with a 4–3 record. They faced Muirhead's British side in their final round robin draw, with the chance to secure the fourth playoff spot. The team, however, would lose 8–1 to Team Muirhead, meaning Latvia earned the last playoff spot instead of them. At the World Women's Championship, the team finished in tenth-place with a 4–8 record, defeating Czech Republic, Norway, Scotland and Turkey.

The 2022–23 season was a breakthrough year for the Italian women's team as they rose to the top ranks in the world. After two quarterfinal finishes in their first three events, the team won their first tour event at the S3 Group Curling Stadium Series, defeating Ha Seung-youn 7–3 in the championship game. They played in Swift Current again the following weekend at the 2022 Western Showdown where they lost in the semifinals to Meghan Walter. At the 2022 European Curling Championships, the team entered the knockout round for the first time since 2017, posting a second place 6–3 record through the round robin. They could not continue their momentum into the playoffs, however, losing both the semifinal and the bronze medal game to Switzerland and Scotland respectively to finish fourth. With their strong results accumulated during the season, Team Constantini qualified for their first Grand Slam of Curling event at the 2023 Canadian Open. After starting the event 0–2, they stayed alive with narrow victories over Casey Scheidegger and Tabitha Peterson. They then lost in the C qualifier game to Anna Hasselborg, eliminating them from contention. At the 2023 World Women's Curling Championship, the Italian team qualified for the playoffs for the first time in world women's championship history, finishing fourth in the round robin with a 7–5 record. They then lost the qualification game to Sweden 4–3, finishing fifth. In the off season, the team added Swiss curler Elena Mathis at third as she has dual citizenship in both Switzerland and Italy.

Following their breakthrough season, Team Constantini had an even stronger 2023–24 season, becoming the first Italian women's team to rank inside the top ten in the world. At their first event, the team went undefeated at the 2023 Euro Super Series until the final where they lost to Delaney Strouse. They then had a semifinal finish at the 2023 Women's Masters Basel after a narrow loss to Hasselborg. In Canada, the team had five consecutive playoff appearances. After quarterfinal losses at the 2023 Players Open and the 2023 Tour Challenge, Team Constantini won the North Grenville Women's Fall Curling Classic, going undefeated to capture the title. They then made it to the semifinals of the Stu Sells 1824 Halifax Classic before another quarterfinal finish at the 2023 National. Next for the team was the 2023 European Curling Championships where they improved on their 2022 result, finishing second through the round robin with a 7–2 record. They then downed Sweden's Isabella Wranå in the semifinals to qualify for the final against Switzerland's Silvana Tirinzoni. After the Italians got two in the ninth to take the lead, Swiss fourth Alina Pätz made a perfect hit-and-roll to the button in the tenth end to count two and win the game 6–5. The team then fell into a slump, only qualifying in one of their next four events. They also lost the final of the Italian Women's Championship to the junior Rebecca Mariani rink. Despite this, they were still chosen to represent Italy at the 2024 World Women's Curling Championship in Sydney, Nova Scotia. There, the team got back to their winning ways, finishing 10–2 through the round robin and qualifying for the playoffs as the third seeds. They then beat Denmark's Madeleine Dupont to qualify for the final four before losing both the semifinal and bronze medal game to Switzerland and Korea respectively, placing fourth. Team Constantini ended the season at the 2024 Players' Championship where they went 1–4.

To begin the 2024–25 season, Team Constantini reached the final of the 2024 Euro Super Series, again finishing second place after falling to Fay Henderson. They then had a pair of quarterfinal finishes at the 2024 Stu Sells Oakville Tankard and the 2024 Women's Masters Basel before playing in the first Grand Slam of the season, the 2024 Tour Challenge. There, Team Constantini won all three of their games in the A event, advancing to the playoffs where they lost to Kaitlyn Lawes. After another quarterfinal finish at the 2024 Canadian Open, the team played in the 2024 European Curling Championships where they started by winning six of their first seven games. However, they then lost their final two round robin games before dropping both their playoff games to Switzerland and Scotland respectively, finishing fourth. In the new year, the team won the Italian Women's Championship and went on to compete in the 2025 World Women's Curling Championship. There, they were unable to replicate their success from the year before, finishing in tenth with a disappointing 4–8 record.

=== Mixed doubles ===
While attending Università Telematica Universitas Mercatorum, Zardini Lacedelli represented Italy in mixed doubles curling alongside boyfriend Francesco de Zanna as the host nation at the 2025 World University Games in Turin where they finished 4th, losing to Canada 9–3 in the bronze medal game.

== Personal life ==
As of 2024, she is a student.

== Grand Slam record ==
Key
C	Champion
F	Lost in Final
SF	Lost in Semifinal
QF	Lost in Quarterfinals
R16	Lost in the round of 16
Q	Did not advance to playoffs
T2	Played in Tier 2 event
DNP	Did not participate in event
N/A	Not a Grand Slam event that season

Event	2022–23	2023–24	2024–25	2025–26	2026–27
Invitational	DNP	QF	QF	QF	Q
Masters	DNP	DNP	DNP	Q	DNP
National	DNP	QF	Q	DNP	DNP
Open	Q	DNP	QF	Q	DNP
Players'	DNP	Q	DNP	DNP	

== Teams ==
Season	Skip	Third	Second	Lead	Alternate
2017–18	Stefania Constantini	Valeria Girardi	Giulia Zardini Lacedelli	Elisa De Zordo	Lorenza Piccin
2018–19	Stefania Constantini	Giulia Zardini Lacedelli	Valeria Girardi	Lorenza Piccin	Marta Lo Deserto
2019–20	Veronica Zappone	Stefania Constantini	Angela Romei	Giulia Zardini Lacedelli	Elena Dami
2019–20	Stefania Constantini	Giulia Zardini Lacedelli	Lorenza Piccin	Denise Fundone	Katia Sottsass
2020–21	Stefania Constantini	Marta Lo Deserto	Angela Romei	Giulia Zardini Lacedelli	Elena Dami
2021–22	Stefania Constantini	Marta Lo Deserto	Angela Romei	Giulia Zardini Lacedelli	Elena Dami
2022–23	Stefania Constantini	Marta Lo Deserto	Angela Romei	Giulia Zardini Lacedelli	Camilla Gilberti
2023–24	Stefania Constantini	Elena Mathis	Angela Romei	Giulia Zardini Lacedelli	Marta Lo Deserto
2024–25	Stefania Constantini	Giulia Zardini Lacedelli	Elena Mathis	Angela Romei	Marta Lo Deserto
2025–26	Stefania Constantini	Elena Mathis	Angela Romei	Giulia Zardini Lacedelli	Marta Lo Deserto
2025–26	Stefania Constantini	Elena Mathis	Marta Lo Deserto	Giulia Zardini Lacedelli	Rebecca Mariani
2026–27	Giulia Zardini Lacedelli	Elena Mathis	Marta Lo Deserto	Rachele Scalesse	
