= Camilla Gilberti =

Italian curler

- Curler ♀
- Born: 30 September 2002 (age 24)

Team
- Curling club: A.S.D. Associazione Curling Cembra, Cembra
- Skip: Giada Zambelli (fourth)
- Third: Camilla Gilberti (skip)
- Second: Allegra Grande
- Lead: Greta Aghemo
- Alternate: Michela Alverà

Curling career
- Member Association: Italy
- World Championship: 1 (2023)
- European Championship: 1 (2022)
- Other appearances: Winter World University Games: 1 (2025)
Medal record
Curling
Italian Mixed Doubles Championship
Silver medal – second place	2022 Cembra

Camilla Gilberti (born 30 September 2002) is an Italian curler.

At the international level, she competed for Italy at the 2023 World Women's Championship, the 2022 European Championship and the 2025 Winter World University Games.

At the national level, she is an Italian Mixed Doubles Championship silver medalist.

== Teams and events ==
=== Women's ===
Season	Skip	Third	Second	Lead	Alternate	Coach	Events
2020–21	Camilla Gilberti	Evelyn Mosaner	Alessandra Callegari	Valentina Holler			IJCC 2021 (silver)
2020–21	Camilla Gilberti	Alice Cobelli	Alessandra Callegari	Valentina Holler	Evelyn Mosaner	Amos Mosaner	IWCC 2021 (4th)
2022–23	Marta Lo Deserto	Rebecca Mariani	Lucrezia Grande	Camilla Gilberti	Giada Zambelli	Marco Mariani, Alberto Pimpini	WJBCC 2022 (Dec) (11th)
2022–23	Camilla Gilberti	Alessandra Callegari	Valentina Holler	Denise Franzoi	Luca Gilberti		IJCC 2023 (bronze)
2022–23	Stefania Constantini	Marta Lo Deserto	Angela Romei	Giulia Zardini Lacedelli	Camilla Gilberti	Violetta Caldart	ECC 2022 (4th); WCC 2023 (5th)
2024–25	Camilla Gilberti	Lucrezia Grande	Giada Zambelli	Rachele Scalesse		Ekaterina Galkina	WUG 2025 (8th)
2024–25	Giada Zambelli (fourth)	Camilla Gilberti (skip)	Allegra Grande	Greta Aghemo	Michela Alverà		IWCC 2025 (5th)

=== Mixed doubles ===
Season	Female	Male	Events
2019–20	Camilla Gilberti	Luca Casagrande	IMDCC 2020 (13th)
2021–22	Camilla Gilberti	Sebastiano Arman	IMDCC 2022 (silver)
