= Craig Waddell =

Scottish male curler

- Curler
- Born: 18 January 1995 (age 31); Hamilton, Scotland

Team
- Skip: Grant Hardie
- Fourth: Ross Whyte
- Second: Craig Waddell
- Lead: Euan Kyle

Curling career
- Member Association: Scotland
- World Championship: 2 (2022, 2026)
- European Championship: 2 (2019, 2026)
- Grand Slam victories: 1 (2026 Players')
Medal record
Men's curling
Representing Scotland
World Championships
Bronze medal – third place	2026 Ogden
European Championships
Gold medal – first place	2026 Ostrava
Bronze medal – third place	2019 Helsingborg
Scottish Men's Championship
Gold medal – first place	2022 Dumfries
Gold medal – first place	2026 Dumfries
Scottish Mixed Doubles Championship
Bronze medal – third place	2018 Glasgow

Craig Waddell (born 18 January 1995) is a Scottish curler, a 2019 European bronze medallist. He is from Stirling.

== Teams ==
=== Men's ===
Season	Skip	Third	Second	Lead	Alternate	Coach	Events
2010–11	Graeme Black	Kyle Waddell	Peter Macintyre	Craig Waddell			SMCC 2011 (8th)
2012–13	Hammy McMillan Jr.	Sandy Reid	Moray Combe	Craig Waddell			SMCC 2013 (10th)
2014–15	Kyle Waddell	Callum Kinnear	Cameron Smith	Craig Waddell		David Ramsay	SJCC 2015 (silver)
2015–16	Robin Brydone	Craig Waddell	Calum Greenwood	Callum Kinnear			SJCC 2016 (5th)
2015–16	Robin Brydone	Ross McCleary	Calum Greenwood	Craig Waddell			SMCC 2016 (8th)
2016–17	Stuart Taylor	Craig Waddell	Fraser Davidson	Gavin Barr			SMCC 2017 (9th)
2017–18	Fraser Hare	Jay McWilliam	Craig Waddell	Scott Hamilton			SMCC 2018 (8th)
2018–19	Robin Brydone	Craig Waddell	Gregor Cannon	Fraser Davidson			SMCC 2019 (4th)
2019–20	Ross Paterson	Kyle Waddell	Duncan Menzies	Michael Goodfellow	Craig Waddell	Ian Tetley	ECC 2019 (bronze)
2019–20	Cameron Bryce	Craig Waddell	Gregor Cannon	Derrick Sloan		David Ramsay	SMCC 2020 (5th)
2020–21	Cameron Bryce	Craig Waddell	Gregor Cannon	Luke Carson			
2021–22	Ross Paterson	Kyle Waddell	Duncan Menzies	Craig Waddell	Euan Kyle (WCC)	Tom Brewster	SMCC 2022 (gold) , WCC 2022 (5th)
2022–23	Kyle Waddell	Craig Waddell	Mark Taylor	Gavin Barr			
2023–24	Kyle Waddell	Craig Waddell	Mark Taylor	Gavin Barr			
2024–25	Kyle Waddell	Craig Waddell	Mark Taylor	Gavin Barr			
2025–26	Ross Whyte	Robin Brydone	Craig Waddell	Euan Kyle	Duncan McFadzean		
2026–27	Ross Whyte (Fourth)	Grant Hardie (Skip)	Craig Waddell	Euan Kyle			

=== Mixed ===
Season	Skip	Third	Second	Lead	Alternate	Events
2014–15	Craig Waddell	Heather Morton	Cameron Smith	Jodie Milroy		SMxCC 2015 (silver)
2015–16	Craig Waddell	Mili Smith	Cameron Smith	Sophie Sinclair		SMxCC 2016 (bronze)
2016–17	Craig Waddell	Mili Smith	Cameron Smith	Sophie Sinclair		SMxCC 2017 (silver)
2017–18	Craig Waddell	Mili Smith	Cameron Smith	Sophie Sinclair		SMxCC 2018 (5th)

=== Mixed doubles ===
Season	Male	Female	Events
2018–19	Craig Waddell	Alice Spence	SMDCC 2018 (bronze)
2021–22	Craig Waddell	Kirstin Bousie	SMDCC 2022 (13th)

== Personal life ==
Waddell is the grandson of 1979 European champion Jimmy Waddell. His older brother Kyle is also a curler. They played together at the 2019 European championships.
