= Angela Romei =

Italian curler

- Curler
- Born: February 20, 1997 (age 29); Monopoli, Italy

Team
- Curling club: 3S Sys-tek, Pinerolo, ITA
- Skip: Stefania Constantini
- Third: Lucrezia Grande
- Second: Angela Romei
- Lead: Allegra Grande

Curling career
- Member Association: Italy
- World Championship: 6 (2018, 2021, 2022, 2023, 2024, 2025)
- European Championship: 9 (2014, 2017, 2018, 2019, 2021, 2022, 2023, 2024, 2025)
Medal record
Women's curling
Representing Italy
European Championships
Silver medal – second place	2023 Aberdeen
Bronze medal – third place	2017 St Gallen

Angela Romei (born February 20, 1997 in Monopoli) is an Italian curler from Pinerolo. She currently plays second on Team Stefania Constantini.

== Career ==
Romei joined the Italian junior team skipped by Veronica Zappone as alternate for the 2013–14 season. In her first season with the team, they won the 2014 European Junior Curling Challenge after an unblemished 8–0 record. This qualified Romei and teammates Zappone, Elisa Charlotte Patono, Martina Bronsino and Arianna Losano for the 2014 World Junior Curling Championships in Flims, Switzerland. There, the team finished the week in ninth place with a 2–7 record, earning wins over Czech Republic and Denmark. The following season, the team again made the playoffs at the 2015 European Junior Curling Challenge before a semifinal loss to Turkey eliminated them from contention. Also during the 2014–15 season, Team Zappone earned the right to represent Italy at the 2014 European Curling Championships. In the B Division, the team qualified for the playoffs with a 6–3 record. They then lost the 3 vs. 4 game to Hungary, being eliminated and failing to qualify Italy for the A Division. They took the B Division bronze medal with a 10–2 win over Austria. Romei took over as skip of the junior team for the 2015–16 season. At the 2016 World Junior B Curling Championships, her team finished with a 3–3 record but lost in a tiebreaker to Poland, failing to qualify. In her last year of junior eligibility, she missed the playoffs at the 2017 World Junior B Curling Championships with a 2–4 record.

Romei was added to the Italian National Women's Curling Team for the 2017–18 season as the team's lead. The team also consisted of skip Diana Gaspari, third Veronica Zappone, second Stefania Constantini, and alternate Chiara Olivieri. The team's first international event of the season came at the 2017 European Curling Championships in St. Gallen, Switzerland. The team played well through the round robin and qualified for the playoffs over higher-ranked teams such as Russia's Anna Sidorova and Germany's Daniela Jentsch. After losing in the semifinal to Sweden's Anna Hasselborg, the Italian team upset Switzerland's Silvana Tirinzoni 7–6 to earn the bronze medal, Italy's third-ever medal in the women's event at the European Championships. Next, the Italian women's rink competed in the 2017 Olympic Qualification Event in attempts to earn a spot in the 2018 Winter Olympics in PyeongChang, South Korea. The team once again performed well at the event, finishing the round robin in first place with a 5–1 record. This gave them two opportunities to secure their spot in the Olympics. In the first qualification final, the Italian side gave up nine stolen points against China's Wang Bingyu, ultimately losing the game 11–4. They had a second opportunity to qualify for the Games against Denmark's Madeleine Dupont in the second qualification final. In a tight game, Denmark's Dupont scored one in the extra end to win 5–4 and earn the final spot in the Olympics, meaning Italy would miss out on the Games. The team had one more international event during the season with Romei competing in her first World Curling Championship at the 2018 World Women's Curling Championship. Despite their prior success, Team Gaspari finished in last at the World Championship with a 2–10 record, only defeating Scotland's Hannah Fleming and Russia's Victoria Moiseeva.

With Diana Gaspari stepping away from the women's team, Romei moved up to second on the Italian rink, with Veronica Zappone taking over as skip for the 2018–19 season. Constantini moved up to play third while Federica Ghedina and Elena Dami were added at lead and alternate, respectively. The team remained in the A Division at the 2018 European Curling Championships but finished in last with a 2–7 record. This relegated Italy to the B Division for the 2019 event, meaning they wouldn't qualify for the 2019 World Women's Curling Championship. In March 2019, Romei played third on the Italian team that represented the country at the 2019 Winter Universiade. There, the team finished in last with a 2–7 record.

By finishing last at the 2018 edition, the Zappone rink was relegated to the B Division of the 2019 European Curling Championships, where they would need to finish in the top two to promote themselves back into the A Division and earn a spot in the 2020 World Qualification Event. Through the round robin, the team suffered two defeats en route to a second-place finish in the group, only behind Turkey's Dilşat Yıldız who handed the Italian's one of their two losses. Team Zappone faced Hungary's Dorottya Palancsa in the semifinal and won the game 9–4, earning themselves a spot in the final where they would go against the Turkish side. The Italian's opened up a comfortable lead through the first five ends, which they rode to a 5–2 victory over Turkey and a gold medal in the B Division. Their win secured their spot in the World Qualification Event in January 2020, where two countries would qualify for the 2020 World Women's Curling Championship. The team finished 6–1 through the round robin, only losing to the unbeaten South Korean team of Gim Un-chi. They then faced Gim's rink in the first qualification game, where South Korea made a comeback in the second half of the game to beat the Italians 6–5. They then faced Yıldız's Turkish rink in the second qualification game for the final spot in the World Championship, which they won 8–4. Unfortunately, the World Championship was cancelled due to the COVID-19 pandemic.

Due to the pandemic, the European Curling Championships were canceled. As a result, the field for the 2021 World Women's Curling Championship was expanded to fourteen teams as many countries did not have the opportunity to qualify for the Championship. Based on their success at the 2020 World Qualification Event, the Italian women's team earned the fourteenth and final spot in the championship. Constantini moved up to skip the Italian team which also included third Marta Lo Deserto, Romei at second, lead Giulia Zardini Lacedelli and alternate Elena Dami. The team finished in thirteenth place at the Championship with a 2–11 record, defeating Estonia's Marie Turmann and Germany's Daniela Jentsch.

At the 2021 European Curling Championships in Lillehammer, Norway, the Italian team finished with a 4–5 round robin record. This placed them sixth in the group, which was good enough to earn Italy a spot in the 2022 World Women's Curling Championship. In the sixth round robin draw, the team defeated Scotland's Eve Muirhead 8–7, being the only team to defeat the Scottish side as they went on to win the gold medal in the playoff round. In December 2021, the team traveled to Leeuwarden, Netherlands to compete in the 2021 Olympic Qualification Event, hoping to secure Italy a spot in the women's event at the Beijing Olympics. After eight draws, the Italian team sat in fourth place in the standings with a 4–3 record. They faced Muirhead's British side in their final round robin draw, with the chance to secure the fourth playoff spot. The team, however, would lose 8–1 to Team Muirhead, meaning Latvia earned the last playoff spot instead of them. In March 2022, the team had a 4–8 record and tenth-place finish at the World Women's Championship, defeating the Czech Republic, Norway, Scotland, and Turkey.

The 2022–23 season was a breakthrough year for the Italian women's team as they rose to the top ranks in the world. After two quarterfinal finishes in their first three events, the team won their first tour event at the S3 Group Curling Stadium Series, defeating Ha Seung-youn 7–3 in the championship game. They played in Swift Current again the following weekend at the 2022 Western Showdown where they lost in the semifinals to Meghan Walter. At the 2022 European Curling Championships, the team entered the knockout round for the first time since 2017, posting a second place 6–3 record through the round robin. They could not continue their momentum into the playoffs, however, losing both the semifinal and the bronze medal game to Switzerland and Scotland respectively to finish fourth. With their strong results accumulated during the season, Team Constantini qualified for their first Grand Slam of Curling event at the 2023 Canadian Open. After starting the event 0–2, they stayed alive with narrow victories over Casey Scheidegger and Tabitha Peterson. They then lost in the C qualifier game to Anna Hasselborg, eliminating them from contention. At the 2023 World Women's Curling Championship, the Italian team qualified for the playoffs for the first time in world women's championship history, finishing fourth in the round robin with a 7–5 record. They then lost the qualification game to Sweden 4–3, finishing fifth. In the off season, the team added Swiss curler Elena Mathis at third as she has dual citizenship in both Switzerland and Italy.

Following their breakthrough season, Team Constantini had an even stronger 2023–24 season, becoming the first Italian women's team to rank inside the top ten in the world. At their first event, the team went undefeated at the 2023 Euro Super Series until the final where they lost to Delaney Strouse. They then had a semifinal finish at the 2023 Women's Masters Basel after a narrow loss to Hasselborg. In Canada, the team had five consecutive playoff appearances. After quarterfinal losses at the 2023 Players Open and the 2023 Tour Challenge, Team Constantini won the North Grenville Women's Fall Curling Classic, going undefeated to capture the title. They then made it to the semifinals of the Stu Sells 1824 Halifax Classic before another quarterfinal finish at the 2023 National. Next for the team was the 2023 European Curling Championships where they improved on their 2022 result, finishing second through the round robin with a 7–2 record. They then downed Sweden's Isabella Wranå in the semifinals to qualify for the final against Switzerland's Silvana Tirinzoni. After the Italians got two in the ninth to take the lead, Swiss fourth Alina Pätz made a perfect hit-and-roll to the button in the tenth end to count two and win the game 6–5. The team then fell into a slump, only qualifying in one of their next four events. They also lost the final of the Italian Women's Championship to the junior Rebecca Mariani rink. Despite this, they were still chosen to represent Italy at the 2024 World Women's Curling Championship in Sydney, Nova Scotia. There, the team got back to their winning ways, finishing 10–2 through the round robin and qualifying for the playoffs as the third seeds. They then beat Denmark's Madeleine Dupont to qualify for the final four before losing both the semifinal and bronze medal game to Switzerland and Korea respectively, placing fourth. Team Constantini ended the season at the 2024 Players' Championship where they went 1–4.

To begin the 2024–25 season, Team Constantini reached the final of the 2024 Euro Super Series, again finishing second place after falling to Fay Henderson. They then had a pair of quarterfinal finishes at the 2024 Stu Sells Oakville Tankard and the 2024 Women's Masters Basel before playing in the first Grand Slam of the season, the 2024 Tour Challenge. There, Team Constantini won all three of their games in the A event, advancing to the playoffs where they lost to Kaitlyn Lawes. After another quarterfinal finish at the 2024 Canadian Open, the team played in the 2024 European Curling Championships where they started by winning six of their first seven games. However, they then lost their final two round robin games before dropping both their playoff games to Switzerland and Scotland respectively, finishing fourth. In the new year, the team won the Italian Women's Championship and went on to compete in the 2025 World Women's Curling Championship. There, they were unable to replicate their success from the year before, finishing in tenth with a disappointing 4–8 record.

After being part of the Italian national team since 2017, Romei was unexpectedly left off the roster for the 2026 Winter Olympics in favor of the less experienced Rebecca Mariani, a controversial decision as Mariani is the daughter of technical director Marco Mariani.

== Personal life ==
Romei is a full-time curler.

== Teams ==
Season	Skip	Third	Second	Lead	Alternate
2013–14	Veronica Zappone	Elisa Charlotte Patono	Martina Bronsino	Arianna Losano	Angela Romei
2014–15	Veronica Zappone	Elisa Charlotte Patono	Martina Bronsino	Arianna Losano	Angela Romei
2015–16	Angela Romei	Barbara Gentile	Alice Gaudenzi	Martina Bronsino	Elisa Charlotte Patono
2016–17	Angela Romei	Barbara Gentile	Alice Gaudenzi	Giulia Mingozzi	Anna Maria Maurino
2017–18	Diana Gaspari	Veronica Zappone	Stefania Constantini	Angela Romei	Chiara Olivieri
2018–19	Veronica Zappone	Stefania Constantini	Angela Romei	Elena Dami	Federica Ghedini
2019–20	Veronica Zappone	Stefania Constantini	Angela Romei	Giulia Zardini Lacedelli	Elena Dami
2020–21	Stefania Constantini	Marta Lo Deserto	Angela Romei	Giulia Zardini Lacedelli	Elena Dami
2021–22	Stefania Constantini	Marta Lo Deserto	Angela Romei	Giulia Zardini Lacedelli	Elena Dami
2022–23	Stefania Constantini	Marta Lo Deserto	Angela Romei	Giulia Zardini Lacedelli	Camilla Gilberti
2023–24	Stefania Constantini	Elena Mathis	Angela Romei	Giulia Zardini Lacedelli	Marta Lo Deserto
2024–25	Stefania Constantini	Giulia Zardini Lacedelli	Elena Mathis	Angela Romei	Marta Lo Deserto
2025–26	Stefania Constantini	Elena Mathis	Angela Romei	Giulia Zardini Lacedelli	Marta Lo Deserto
2026–27	Stefania Constantini	Lucrezia Grande	Angela Romei	Allegra Grande	
