= Rebecca Mariani =

Italian curler (born 2006)

- Curler
- Born: November 2, 2006 (age 20); Pieve di Cadore, Italy

Team
- Curling club: SC Pinerolo, Pinerolo, ITA
- Skip: Rebecca Mariani
- Third: Rachele Scalesse
- Second: Letizia Gaia Carlisano
- Lead: Giada Zambelli
- Alternate: Allegra Grande

Curling career
- Member Association: Italy
- World Championship: 1 (2026)
- World Junior Curling Championship: 1 (2025)
- Olympic: 1 (2026)

Rebecca Mariani (born November 2, 2006 in Pieve di Cadore) is an Italian curler from Pinerolo. She currently skips the Italian national junior women's curling team. She was controversially chosen as the alternate for the Italian women's team at the 2026 Winter Olympics.

== Career ==
=== Juniors ===
Mariani first joined the Italian national junior team for the 2022–23 season as third for Marta Lo Deserto. At the 2022 World Junior-B Curling Championships, the team just missed the playoffs after a 3–2 record in the round robin. The following year, Lo Deserto aged out of juniors and Mariani was promoted to skip of the team. Competing at the 2023 World Junior-B Curling Championships, her team finished 5–1 in the round robin, advancing to the playoffs where they were defeated by Türkiye in the quarterfinals.

Because Italy hosted the 2025 World Junior Curling Championships as a preparation event for the 2026 Winter Olympics, the Italian women's team earned a direct spot at the championship as host. There, Mariani led her team to a 2–7 last place finish, however, managed a win over eventual bronze medalists Canada. The next season, the team was back in the B Division after being relegated due to their poor result at the World Championship. At the 2025 World Junior-B Curling Championships, Mariani led her team to a 5–2 round robin record before they were once again eliminated in the quarterfinals, this time by Scotland.

=== Women's ===
While still in juniors, Mariani and her team went undefeated to win the 2024 Italian Women's Curling Championship, defeating the national women's team skipped by Stefania Constantini 6–4 in the final. The team also knocked off Constantini 7–3 in the round robin to earn a direct bye to the championship game. The following season, the team won silver after losing 10–4 in the final to the women's team.

During the 2025–26 season, Mariani spared for the national women's team at the 2025 Oslo Cup and the Mercure Perth Masters, reaching the semifinals at both events. Later in the season, she was selected to be the alternate for the team at the 2026 Winter Olympics, replacing Angela Romei who had been on the team since 2017. This decision sparked controversy as the technical director of the Italian program who made the decision is Mariani's father Marco, bringing nepotism claims into question.

=== Mixed ===
Mariani competed at the 2023 European Youth Olympic Winter Festival as lead for the Italian team skipped by Andrea Gilli. There, the team finished with a 4–1 record in the round robin before dropping their quarterfinal game to eventual gold medalists Switzerland. This same team later represented Italy at the 2024 Winter Youth Olympics where they just missed out on the playoffs with a 4–3 record, losing out on head-to-head record.

== Personal life ==
As of 2024, Mariani lives in Pinerolo. Her father Marco Mariani competed in the 2006 Winter Olympics as a member of Joël Retornaz's men's team. Her grandfather Lino Mariani was a founder of the historic Curling Club 66 Cortina and played for Italy at the 1973 and 1974 World Men's Curling Championships. As of 2026, she was a student.

== Teams ==
Season	Skip	Third	Second	Lead	Alternate
2022–23	Marta Lo Deserto	Rebecca Mariani	Lucrezia Grande	Camilla Gilberti	Giada Zambelli
2023–24	Rebecca Mariani	Giorgia Maurino	Camilla Gilberti	Lucrezia Grande	Rachele Scalesse
2024–25	Rebecca Mariani	Lucrezia Grande	Letizia Gaia Carlisano	Rachele Scalesse	Giada Zambelli
2025–26	Rebecca Mariani	Rachele Scalesse	Letizia Gaia Carlisano	Giada Zambelli	Allegra Grande
