= Cameron Bryce =

Scottish curler (born 1995)

- Curler
- Born: 20 July 1995 (age 31)

Team
- Curling club: Border Ice Rink, Kelso, SCO
- Skip: Cameron Bryce
- Third: Karsten Sturmay
- Second: Kerr Drummond
- Lead: Scott Hyslop
- Alternate: Robin McCall

Curling career
- Member Association: Scotland
- World Mixed Championship: 3 (2015, 2016, 2022)
Medal record
Curling
Representing Scotland
World Mixed Curling Championship
Silver medal – second place	2022 Aberdeen
Bronze medal – third place	2016 Kazan

Cameron Bryce (born 20 July 1995) is a Scottish curler from Kelso. He currently skips his own team out of Kinross.

== Career ==
Bryce has skipped Scotland three times at the World Mixed Curling Championship. He and teammates Katie Murray, Bobby Lammie and Sophie Jackson finished 9th place at the 2015 World Mixed Curling Championship. The team was much more successful at the 2016 World Mixed Curling Championship. The team won their group with an undefeated 6–0 record, and then went on to beat Canada in the quarterfinals before losing to Sweden in the semifinal. In the bronze medal game, Scotland defeated South Korea. Bryce then improved upon this placement at the 2022 World Mixed Curling Championship, finishing 7-1 in group play, and making their way to the gold medal game, finishing in second place after losing to Canada and Jean-Michel Ménard 7-4 in the final.

After winning the 2017 Scottish Junior Men's Curling Championship, Bryce skipped Scotland at the 2017 World Junior Curling Championships. He and his rink of Robin Brydone, Euan Kyle and Frazer Shaw would finish the round robin portion of the tournament with a 6–3 record, in 3rd place. In the playoffs, they would beat Norway in the 3 vs. 4 game, but lost to South Korea in the semifinal and then lost to Norway in a rematch in the bronze medal game, settling for fourth place.

Bryce and teammates Ross Whyte, Brydone and Kyle would win his first World Curling Tour event at the 2017 Tallinn Challenger.

== Grand Slam record ==
Key
C	Champion
F	Lost in Final
SF	Lost in Semifinal
QF	Lost in Quarterfinals
R16	Lost in the round of 16
Q	Did not advance to playoffs
T2	Played in Tier 2 event
DNP	Did not participate in event
N/A	Not a Grand Slam event that season

Event	2019–20	2020–21	2021–22	2022–23	2023–24	2024–25	2025–26
Masters	DNP	N/A	DNP	DNP	Q	DNP	T2
Tour Challenge	T2	N/A	N/A	DNP	T2	Q	DNP
