= Marta Lo Deserto =

Italian curler (born 2002)

- Curler
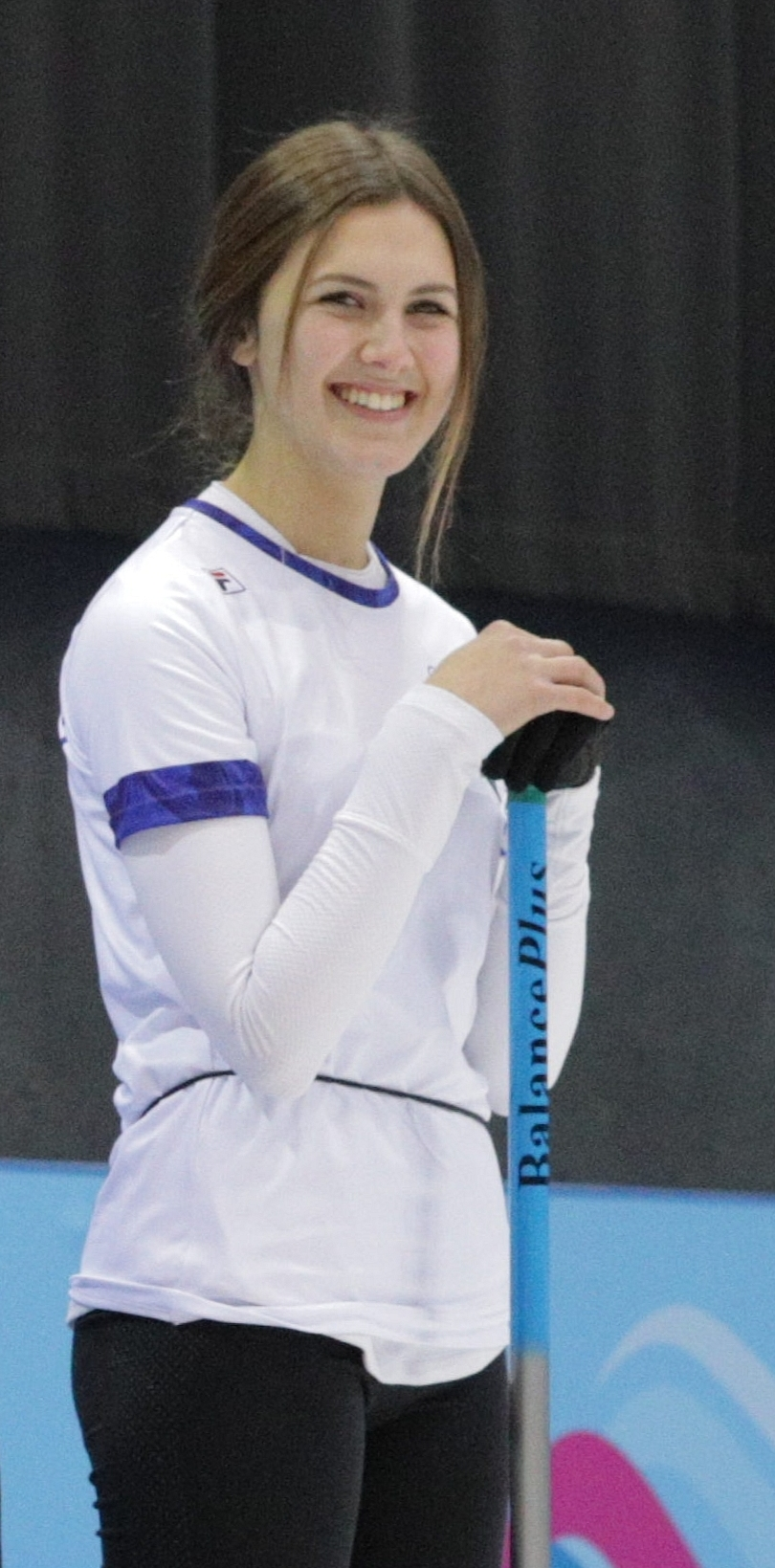
- Lo Deserto at the 2020 Winter Youth Olympics
- Born: March 30, 2002 (age 24); Pieve di Cadore, Italy

Team
- Curling club: CC Dolomiti, Cortina d'Ampezzo, ITA
- Skip: Giulia Zardini Lacedelli
- Third: Elena Mathis
- Second: Marta Lo Deserto
- Lead: Rachele Scalesse
- Mixed doubles partner: Giacomo Colli

Curling career
- Member Association: Italy
- World Championship: 6 (2021, 2022, 2023, 2024, 2025, 2026)
- European Championship: 6 (2021, 2022, 2023, 2024, 2025, 2026)
- Olympic: 1 (2026)
Medal record
Women's curling
Representing Italy
European Championships
Silver medal – second place	2023 Aberdeen

Marta Lo Deserto (born March 30, 2002) is an Italian curler from Cortina d'Ampezzo, Italy. She currently plays second on Team Giulia Zardini Lacedelli.

== Career ==
Lo Deserto made her international debut at the 2019 World Junior-B Curling Championships as alternate for the Stefania Constantini rink. The team finished 3–3 at the tournament, failing to qualifying for the 2019 World Junior Curling Championships. The next month, she skipped the Italian mixed team at the 2019 European Youth Olympic Winter Festival, finishing with a 3–3 record.

In 2020, her mixed team represented Italy at the 2020 Youth Olympics. After finishing 4–1 in the round robin, they lost to Norway in the quarterfinals. She then competed in the mixed doubles tournament with Spanish curler Aleix Raubert. They lost in the round of 24.

She joined the Italian National Women's Curling Team at third for the 2020–21 season. With teammates Stefania Constantini, Angela Romei, Giulia Zardini Lacedelli and Elena Dami, she competed in her first World Championship at the 2021 World Women's Curling Championship. The Italian team was originally not supposed to compete in the 2021 championship, but due to the cancellation of qualification events as well as the change in the Olympic Qualification Process, they were added as the fourteenth team. At the World Championships, the team finished in thirteenth place with a 2–11 record, their wins coming against Estonia and Germany.

At the 2021 European Curling Championships in Lillehammer, Norway, the Italian team posted a 4–5 round robin record. This placed them sixth in the group, which was good enough to earn Italy a spot in the 2022 World Women's Curling Championship. In the sixth round robin draw, the team defeated Scotland's Eve Muirhead 8–7, being the only team to defeat the Scottish side as they went on to win the gold medal in the playoff round. In December 2021, the team travelled to Leeuwarden, Netherlands to compete in the 2021 Olympic Qualification Event, hoping to secure Italy a spot in the women's event at the Beijing Olympics. After eight draws, the Italian team sat in fourth place in the standings with a 4–3 record. They faced Muirhead's British side in their final round robin draw, with the chance to secure the fourth playoff spot. The team, however, would lose 8–1 to Team Muirhead, meaning Latvia earned the last playoff spot instead of them. At the World Women's Championship, the team finished in tenth-place with a 4–8 record, defeating Czech Republic, Norway, Scotland and Turkey.

The 2022–23 season was a breakthrough year for the Italian women's team as they rose to the top ranks in the world. After two quarterfinal finishes in their first three events, the team won their first tour event at the S3 Group Curling Stadium Series, defeating Ha Seung-youn 7–3 in the championship game. They played in Swift Current again the following weekend at the 2022 Western Showdown where they lost in the semifinals to Meghan Walter. At the 2022 European Curling Championships, the team entered the knockout round for the first time since 2017, posting a second place 6–3 record through the round robin. They could not continue their momentum into the playoffs, however, losing both the semifinal and the bronze medal game to Switzerland and Scotland respectively to finish fourth. With their strong results accumulated during the season, Team Constantini qualified for their first Grand Slam of Curling event at the 2023 Canadian Open. After starting the event 0–2, they stayed alive with narrow victories over Casey Scheidegger and Tabitha Peterson. They then lost in the C qualifier game to Anna Hasselborg, eliminating them from contention. At the 2023 World Women's Curling Championship, the Italian team qualified for the playoffs for the first time in world women's championship history, finishing fourth in the round robin with a 7–5 record. They then lost the qualification game to Sweden 4–3, finishing fifth. In the off season, the team added Swiss curler Elena Mathis at third as she has dual citizenship in both Switzerland and Italy.

Following their breakthrough season, Team Constantini had an even stronger 2023–24 season, becoming the first Italian women's team to rank inside the top ten in the world. At their first event, the team went undefeated at the 2023 Euro Super Series until the final where they lost to Delaney Strouse. They then had a semifinal finish at the 2023 Women's Masters Basel after a narrow loss to Hasselborg. In Canada, the team had five consecutive playoff appearances. After quarterfinal losses at the 2023 Players Open and the 2023 Tour Challenge, Team Constantini won the North Grenville Women's Fall Curling Classic, going undefeated to capture the title. They then made it to the semifinals of the Stu Sells 1824 Halifax Classic before another quarterfinal finish at the 2023 National. Next for the team was the 2023 European Curling Championships where they improved on their 2022 result, finishing second through the round robin with a 7–2 record. They then downed Sweden's Isabella Wranå in the semifinals to qualify for the final against Switzerland's Silvana Tirinzoni. After the Italians got two in the ninth to take the lead, Swiss fourth Alina Pätz made a perfect hit-and-roll to the button in the tenth end to count two and win the game 6–5. The team then fell into a slump, only qualifying in one of their next four events. They also lost the final of the Italian Women's Championship to the junior Rebecca Mariani rink. Despite this, they were still chosen to represent Italy at the 2024 World Women's Curling Championship in Sydney, Nova Scotia. There, the team got back to their winning ways, finishing 10–2 through the round robin and qualifying for the playoffs as the third seeds. They then beat Denmark's Madeleine Dupont to qualify for the final four before losing both the semifinal and bronze medal game to Switzerland and Korea respectively, placing fourth. Team Constantini ended the season at the 2024 Players' Championship where they went 1–4.

To begin the 2024–25 season, Team Constantini reached the final of the 2024 Euro Super Series, again finishing second place after falling to Fay Henderson. They then had a pair of quarterfinal finishes at the 2024 Stu Sells Oakville Tankard and the 2024 Women's Masters Basel before playing in the first Grand Slam of the season, the 2024 Tour Challenge. There, Team Constantini won all three of their games in the A event, advancing to the playoffs where they lost to Kaitlyn Lawes. After another quarterfinal finish at the 2024 Canadian Open, the team played in the 2024 European Curling Championships where they started by winning six of their first seven games. However, they then lost their final two round robin games before dropping both their playoff games to Switzerland and Scotland respectively, finishing fourth. In the new year, the team won the Italian Women's Championship and went on to compete in the 2025 World Women's Curling Championship. There, they were unable to replicate their success from the year before, finishing in tenth with a disappointing 4–8 record.

== Teams ==
Season	Skip	Third	Second	Lead	Alternate
2016–17	Marta Lo Deserto	Federica Ghedina	Francesca Ghedina	Erica Siorpaes	Emily Ghezze
2017–18	Marta Lo Deserto	Federica Ghedina	Francesca Ghedina	Erica Siorpaes	Emily Ghezze
2018–19	Marta Lo Deserto	Federica Ghedina	Francesca Ghedina	Erica Siorpaes	Emily Ghezze
2020–21	Stefania Constantini	Marta Lo Deserto	Angela Romei	Giulia Zardini Lacedelli	Elena Dami
2021–22	Stefania Constantini	Marta Lo Deserto	Angela Romei	Giulia Zardini Lacedelli	Elena Dami
2022–23	Stefania Constantini	Marta Lo Deserto	Angela Romei	Giulia Zardini Lacedelli	Camilla Gilberti
2023–24	Stefania Constantini	Elena Mathis	Angela Romei	Giulia Zardini Lacedelli	Marta Lo Deserto
2024–25	Stefania Constantini	Giulia Zardini Lacedelli	Elena Mathis	Angela Romei	Marta Lo Deserto
2025–26	Stefania Constantini	Elena Mathis	Angela Romei	Giulia Zardini Lacedelli	Marta Lo Deserto
2026–27	Giulia Zardini Lacedelli	Elena Mathis	Marta Lo Deserto	Rachele Scalesse	
