= Robin Brydone =

Scottish curler

- Curler
- Born: 29 October 1996 (age 30); Perth, Scotland

Team
- Curling club: Airleywight Curling Club, Perth
- Skip: Bruce Mouat
- Third: Robin Brydone
- Second: Bobby Lammie
- Lead: Hammy McMillan Jr.
- Mixed doubles partner: Sophie Sinclair

Curling career
- Member Association: Scotland
- World Championship: 1 (2026)
- Grand Slam victories: 2 (2025 Masters, 2026 Players')
Medal record
World Championships
Bronze medal – third place	2026 Ogden
World Junior Championships
Gold medal – first place	2016 Copenhagen
Silver medal – second place	2018 Aberdeen
Scottish Men's Championship
Gold medal – first place	2024 Dumfries
Gold medal – first place	2025 Dumfries
Gold medal – first place	2026 Dumfries
Silver medal – second place	2022 Dumfries
Bronze medal – third place	2018 Perth
Bronze medal – third place	2023 Dumfries
Scottish Mixed Doubles Championship
Gold medal – first place	2025 Aberdeen

Robin Brydone (born 29 October 1996) is a Scottish curler from Perth, Scotland. He currently plays third on Team Bruce Mouat.

== Career ==
=== Juniors ===
Brydone was the alternate on the Bruce Mouat rink representing Scotland that won a gold medal at the 2016 World Junior Curling Championships. Brydone played in one game at the tournament, subbing in for Bobby Lammie in their game against Denmark after Lammie fell ill. The following year, Brydone played third on the Cameron Bryce rink which won the 2017 Scottish Junior Curling Championships. The team represented Scotland at the 2017 World Junior Curling Championships, where after finished the round robin with a 6–3 record. This qualified the team for the playoffs, where they beat Norway in the 3 vs. 4 game, but lost to both South Korea in the semifinal, and then in a re-match against Norway in the bronze medal game, settling for fourth place. Brydone made it again to the World Juniors in 2018, this time playing third for Ross Whyte after the team won the Scottish Junior Championship. This time, the team went through the round robin undefeated, winning all nine of their games. In the playoffs, they beat Switzerland in the semifinal, but lost to Canada's Tyler Tardi in the final, winning silver in the process.

=== Mixed ===
Outside of junior curling, Brydone won the 2018 Scottish Mixed Curling Championship. He then skipped Team Scotland at the 2018 World Mixed Curling Championship. He led his team to an 8–0 undefeated record in pool play, but lost to Canada in their first playoff game, and were eliminated in the process.

=== Men's ===
While he was in juniors, Brydone played second on Bryce's men's team. The team won a bronze medal at the 2018 Scottish Men's Curling Championship.

After playing with Bryce, Brydone skipped his own rink for a season and joined the Whyte rink again in 2019, and won his first tour events with the team at the 2019 Prague Classic and the Dumfries Challenger Series.

The Whyte rink began the 2021–22 curling season by winning the 2021 KW Fall Classic. In their first Grand Slam event, the 2021 Masters the team made it to the quarterfinals, where they lost to their compatriots, Team Bruce Mouat. At their next event, the 2021 National, the team again made it to the quarters, where they this time lost to Brad Gushue. Later in the season, the team played in the 2022 Scottish Curling Championships, losing in the finals to Ross Paterson. The team finished the season at the 2022 Players' Championship, where they failed to qualify for the playoffs.

The team began the 2022–23 Grand Slam season at the 2022 National, where they missed the playoffs. Their next slam event, the 2022 Tour Challenge was another flop, but the team then went on to win the 2022 Swiss Cup Basel and the Original 16 Tour Bonspiel events on tour. They finally made the playoffs again at the 2022 Masters, losing in the quarters to Team Mouat. They missed the playoffs again at their next slam, the 2023 Canadian Open. The following month, they finished third at the Scottish Championships, but won the Aberdeen International Curling Championship in March. They wrapped up the season losing in a tiebreaker at the 2023 Players' Championship and losing in the quarterfinals at the 2023 Champions Cup to Team Gushue. During the season, Brydone would often skip the team, while Whyte threw last rocks due to Brydone suffering from a back injury, preventing him from sweeping.

The Whyte rink came out of the gate strong to begin the 2023–24 season, reaching the semifinals of the 2023 Baden Masters before losing consecutive finals at the 2023 Euro Super Series and the 2023 Stu Sells Oakville Tankard to Team Mouat. In their fourth event, they succeeded in capturing the 2023 AMJ Campbell Shorty Jenkins Classic, defeating Niklas Edin in the championship game. In Grand Slam play, the team had their best season to date, beginning at the 2023 Tour Challenge where they reached the semifinals. They also qualified at the 2023 National before a quarterfinal loss to Brendan Bottcher. At the 2023 Masters, the team finished with a 2–2 record which was just enough to qualify for a tiebreaker. They then defeated Team Edin to qualify before upsetting Brad Gushue and Yannick Schwaller in the quarterfinals and semifinals to reach their first Slam final. There, they fell 3–2 to Joël Retornaz. In their next two events, the team lost in the final and semifinals of the 2024 Mercure Perth Masters and 2024 Canadian Open respectively, both to the Mouat rink. Next for Team Whyte was the 2024 Scottish championship where they dominated the competition, going undefeated through the entire event. In the final, they beat James Craik 7–6 to claim their first Scottish men's title. Despite this, Team Mouat was still chosen to represent Scotland at the 2024 World Men's Curling Championship. To wrap up their season, the team had a quarterfinal finish at the 2024 Players' Championship.

The Whyte team continued this momentum from the previous season during the 2024-25 curling season, winning their first Grand Slam of Curling event at the 2025 Masters, beating Brad Jacobs in the final. They then defended their Scottish men's title in 2025, beating the current top ranked team in the world, Team Mouat, 8–3 in the final. Despite their strong results on the Grand Slam circuit and defending their men's national championship title, Team Mouat was later chosen by British Curling again to represent Scotland at the 2025 World Men's Curling Championship, who were number one in the world rankings. Team Whyte would finish the 2024-25 season at the 2025 Players' Championship, finishing 2–3.

== Personal life ==
Brydone is engaged to Canadian curler Clancy Grandy. He works as a Development Officer for Scottish Curling and as a Paralympic Pathway Coach. He coached the Scottish mixed doubles wheelchair curling team at the 2023 World Wheelchair Mixed Doubles Curling Championship. He attended secondary school at Perth High School.
