= 2023–24 curling season =

- Sport: Curling

Seasons
- ← 2022–23 2024–25 →

The 2023–24 curling season began in June 2023 and ended in May 2024.

== World Curling Federation events ==
=== Championships ===
| Event | | | Gold | Silver | Bronze |
|---|---|---|---|---|---|
| World Mixed Curling Championship; Aberdeen, Scotland, Oct. 14–21 | | | Sweden (Nygren) | Spain (Vez) | Canada (Asselin) |
| Pan Continental Curling Championships; Kelowna, British Columbia, Canada, Oct. 29 – Nov. 4 | A | M | Canada (Gushue) | South Korea (Park) | Japan (Yanagisawa) |
| Pan Continental Curling Championships; Kelowna, British Columbia, Canada, Oct. 29 – Nov. 4 | A | W | South Korea (Gim) | Japan (Fujisawa) | United States (Peterson) |
| Pan Continental Curling Championships; Kelowna, British Columbia, Canada, Oct. 29 – Nov. 4 | B | M | China (Ma) | Philippines (Pfister) | Hong Kong (Chang) |
| Pan Continental Curling Championships; Kelowna, British Columbia, Canada, Oct. 29 – Nov. 4 | B | W | China (Han) | Jamaica (Hall) | Brazil (Shibuya) |
| World Wheelchair-B Curling Championship; Lohja, Finland, Nov. 5–10 | | | Slovakia (Zaťko) | Estonia (Koitmäe) | Italy (Marchese) |
| European Curling Championships; Aberdeen & Perth, Scotland, Nov. 18–25 | A | M | Scotland (Mouat) | Sweden (Edin) | Switzerland (Schwaller) |
| European Curling Championships; Aberdeen & Perth, Scotland, Nov. 18–25 | A | W | Switzerland (Tirinzoni) | Italy (Constantini) | Norway (Rørvik) |
| European Curling Championships; Aberdeen & Perth, Scotland, Nov. 18–25 | B | M | England (Retchless) | Austria (Genner) | Latvia (Trukšāns) |
| European Curling Championships; Aberdeen & Perth, Scotland, Nov. 18–25 | B | W | Hungary (Kalocsai-van Dorp) | Lithuania (Paulauskaitė) | Poland (Lipińska) |
| World Junior-B Curling Championships; Lohja, Finland, Dec. 8–19 | | M | Canada (Tao) | United States (Wendling) | Denmark (Schmidt) |
| World Junior-B Curling Championships; Lohja, Finland, Dec. 8–19 | | W | China (Li) | Canada (Plett) | Germany (Messenzehl) |
| Youth Olympic Games; Gangneung, South Korea, Jan. 20 – Feb. 1 | | Mx | Great Britain (Carson) | Denmark (Schmidt) | Switzerland (Dryburgh) |
| Youth Olympic Games; Gangneung, South Korea, Jan. 20 – Feb. 1 | | MD | Great Britain (Soutar / Brewster) | Denmark (K. Schmidt / J. Schmidt) | United States (Wendling / Paral) |
| World Junior Curling Championships; Lohja, Finland, Feb. 17–24 | | M | Norway (Høstmælingen) | Italy (Gilli) | Denmark (Schmidt) |
| World Junior Curling Championships; Lohja, Finland, Feb. 17–24 | | W | Switzerland (Schwaller) | Japan (Nihira) | Norway (Bjørnstad) |
| World Wheelchair Curling Championship; Gangneung, South Korea, Mar. 2–9 | | | Norway (Stordahl) | Canada (Ideson) | China (Wang) |
| World Wheelchair Mixed Doubles Curling Championship; Gangneung, South Korea, Mar. 11–16 | | | South Korea (Cho / Jeong) | China (Wang / Yang) | Italy (Berto / Ioriatti) |
| World Women's Curling Championship; Sydney, Nova Scotia, Canada, Mar. 16–24 | | | Canada (Homan) | Switzerland (Tirinzoni) | South Korea (Gim) |
| World Men's Curling Championship; Schaffhausen, Switzerland, Mar. 30 – Apr. 7 | | | Sweden (Edin) | Canada (Gushue) | Italy (Retornaz) |
| World Mixed Doubles Curling Championship; Östersund, Sweden, Apr. 20–27 | | | Sweden (I. Wranå / R. Wranå) | Estonia (Kaldvee / Lill) | Norway (Skaslien / Nedregotten) |
| World Senior Curling Championships; Östersund, Sweden, Apr. 20–27 | | M | Canada (Flemming) | United States (Farbelow) | Sweden (Wranå) |
| World Senior Curling Championships; Östersund, Sweden, Apr. 20–27 | | W | Canada (Froud) | Lithuania (Paulauskaitė) | Scotland (Kennedy) |
| European Curling Championships; Dumfries, Scotland, Apr. 28 – May 4 | C | M | Bulgaria (Seiler) | Israel (Pokras) | Slovenia (Zelinka) |
| European Curling Championships; Dumfries, Scotland, Apr. 28 – May 4 | C | W | Netherlands (Bomas) | Wales (Beever) | Ukraine (Moskalenko) |

=== Qualification events ===
| Event | Qualifiers |
|---|---|
| World Mixed Doubles Qualification Event; Dumfries, Scotland, Dec. 2–7 | Germany; France; New Zealand; China |

== Other events ==
| Event | | Winning skip | Runner-up skip |
|---|---|---|---|
| Canadian YOG Mixed Doubles Qualifying Series; Edmonton, Alberta, Aug. 31 – Sep. 2 | | (Newfoundland and Labrador) Locke / Perry | (Manitoba) Evason / (Alberta) Hiebert |
| Swedish European Qualifier; Jönköping, Sweden, Sep. 20–23 | | Isabella Wranå | Anna Hasselborg |
| German European Trials; Füssen, Germany, Oct. 7–9 | | (Bavaria) Sixten Totzek | (Bavaria) Benny Kapp |
| Portuguese Mixed Doubles Curling Cup; Barrie, Ontario, Oct. 13–15 | | (Portugal) Ethier / Santos | (Portugal) Spalding / Skidmore |
| German Mixed Doubles Trials; Füssen, Germany, Nov. 7–10 | | (Bavaria) Kapp / Totzek | (Bavaria) Schöll / Sutor |
| 1st Uiseong Korean Cup; Uiseong, South Korea, Nov. 20–24 | M | Kim Chang-min | Jeong Byeong-jin |
| 1st Uiseong Korean Cup; Uiseong, South Korea, Nov. 20–24 | W | Kim Eun-jung | Gim Eun-ji |
| Chairman's Cup; Gangneung, South Korea, Dec. 17–19 | M | Kim Chang-min | Jeong Byeong-jin |
| Chairman's Cup; Gangneung, South Korea, Dec. 17–19 | W | Ha Seung-youn | Kim Min-seo |
| Swedish World Mixed Doubles Qualifier; Jönköping, Sweden, Feb. 22–25 | | I. Wranå / R. Wranå | de Val / Magnusson |
| 2nd Uiseong Korean Cup; Uiseong, South Korea, Apr. 29 – May 5 | M | Kim Chang-min | Lee Jae-beom |
| 2nd Uiseong Korean Cup; Uiseong, South Korea, Apr. 29 – May 5 | W | Kim Eun-jung | Ha Seung-youn |

== Curling Canada events ==
=== Championships ===
| Event | | Gold | Silver | Bronze |
|---|---|---|---|---|
| Canadian Mixed Curling Championship; Swift Current, Saskatchewan, Nov. 5–11 | | Saskatchewan (Meachem) | Manitoba (Kurz) | Ontario (McDonald) |
| Canadian Curling Club Championships; Winnipeg, Manitoba, Nov. 19–25 | M | Alberta (Sherrard) | Saskatchewan (Criton) | Quebec (Maheux) |
| Canadian Curling Club Championships; Winnipeg, Manitoba, Nov. 19–25 | W | New Brunswick (Burgess) | Ontario (Thorne) | British Columbia (Craig) |
| Canadian Senior Curling Championships; Vernon, British Columbia, Dec. 3–9 | M | Nova Scotia (Flemming) | Saskatchewan (Korte) | Manitoba (Boehmer) |
| Canadian Senior Curling Championships; Vernon, British Columbia, Dec. 3–9 | W | Ontario (Froud) | Saskatchewan (Martin) | British Columbia (Gushulak) |
| Canadian U18 Curling Championships; Ottawa, Ontario, Feb. 4–10 | M | Newfoundland and Labrador 1 (Perry) | Saskatchewan 1 (Derksen) | Nova Scotia 1 (Atherton) |
| Canadian U18 Curling Championships; Ottawa, Ontario, Feb. 4–10 | W | Manitoba (Hayward) | Quebec 1 (Fortin) | Ontario 2 (Acres) |
| AUS Curling Championships; Montague, Prince Edward Island, Feb. 8–11 | M | (Nova Scotia) Dalhousie Tigers (Purcell) | (Nova Scotia) Saint Mary's Huskies (Mosher) | (New Brunswick) UNB Reds (Stewart) |
| AUS Curling Championships; Montague, Prince Edward Island, Feb. 8–11 | W | (New Brunswick) UNB Reds (Campbell) | (Nova Scotia) Dalhousie Tigers (MacNutt) | (New Brunswick) Mount Allison Mounties (Wynter) |
| Scotties Tournament of Hearts; Calgary, Alberta, Feb. 16–25 | | Ontario (Homan) | Manitoba (Jones) | Manitoba (Cameron) |
| Montana's Brier; Regina, Saskatchewan, Mar. 1–10 | | Canada (Gushue) | Saskatchewan (McEwen) | Alberta (Bottcher) |
| U Sports/Curling Canada University Curling Championships; Fredericton, New Brunswick, Mar. 12–16 | M | (Saskatchewan) Regina Cougars (Bryden) | (Nova Scotia) Dalhousie Tigers (Purcell) | Alberta Golden Bears (Tao) |
| U Sports/Curling Canada University Curling Championships; Fredericton, New Brunswick, Mar. 12–16 | W | Alberta Pandas (Gray-Withers) | (Ontario) Waterloo Warriors (Evans) | (Nova Scotia) Dalhousie Tigers (MacNutt) |
| CCAA/Curling Canada College Curling Championships; Fredericton, New Brunswick, Mar. 12–16 | M | (Ontario) Humber Hawks (Dobson) | (Ontario) Mohawk Mountaineers (Jones) | (Alberta) SAIT Trojans (Baum) |
| CCAA/Curling Canada College Curling Championships; Fredericton, New Brunswick, Mar. 12–16 | W | (Alberta) Concordia Thunder (Wood) | (Alberta) SAIT Trojans (Shannon) | (Ontario) Humber Hawks (Mallett) |
| Canadian Mixed Doubles Curling Championship; Fredericton, New Brunswick, Mar. 17–22 | | (Manitoba) K. Lott / C. Lott | (Alberta) (Saskatchewan) Walker / Muyres | (Alberta) Peterman / Gallant |
| Canadian Wheelchair Curling Championship; Moose Jaw, Saskatchewan, Mar. 24–30 | | Saskatchewan 1 (Dash) | Newfoundland and Labrador (Dean) | British Columbia (Austgarden) |
| Canadian Junior Curling Championships; Fort McMurray, Alberta, Mar. 24–31 | M | Alberta 1 (Wipf) | Nova Scotia 1 (MacIsaac) | Manitoba 2 (Freeman) |
| Canadian Junior Curling Championships; Fort McMurray, Alberta, Mar. 24–31 | W | Nova Scotia 1 (MacNutt) | Ontario 1 (Markle) | Alberta 2 (Beaudry) |

=== Invitationals ===
| Event | | Winning skip | Runner-up skip |
|---|---|---|---|
| U25 NextGen Classic; Edmonton, Alberta, Aug. 30 – Sep. 4 | M | (Saskatchewan) Rylan Kleiter | (Ontario) Sam Mooibroek |
| U25 NextGen Classic; Edmonton, Alberta, Aug. 30 – Sep. 4 | W | (Alberta) Serena Gray-Withers | (Alberta) Abby Marks |
| U25 NextGen Classic; Edmonton, Alberta, Aug. 30 – Sep. 4 | MD | (British Columbia) Kayla MacMillan / Sterling Middleton | (Ontario) Jessica Zheng / Victor Pietrangelo |
| PointsBet Invitational; Oakville, Ontario, Sep. 27 – Oct. 1 | M | (Manitoba) Reid Carruthers | (Manitoba) Matt Dunstone |
| PointsBet Invitational; Oakville, Ontario, Sep. 27 – Oct. 1 | W | (Ontario) Rachel Homan | (Manitoba) Kerri Einarson |
| SGI Canada Best of the West (U30); Saskatoon, Saskatchewan, Apr. 4–7 | M | (Manitoba) Ryan Wiebe | (Saskatchewan) Rylan Kleiter |
| SGI Canada Best of the West (U30); Saskatoon, Saskatchewan, Apr. 4–7 | W | (Alberta) Abby Marks | (Alberta) Kayla Skrlik |

=== Provincial and Territorial Playdowns ===
| Province/ Territory | Women | | | Men | | |
| Province/ Territory | Event | Champion | Runner-up | Event | Champion | Runner-up |
|---|---|---|---|---|---|---|
| Alberta; St. Paul, Jan. 24–28 (Women's); Hinton, Feb. 7–11 (Men's) | Alberta Scotties | Selena Sturmay | Kayla Skrlik | Boston Pizza Cup | Aaron Sluchinski | Kevin Koe |
| British Columbia; Esquimalt, Jan. 23–28 | British Columbia Scotties | Clancy Grandy | Corryn Brown | BC Men's Championship | Catlin Schneider | Jason Montgomery |
| Manitoba; Morden, Jan. 24–28 (Women's); Stonewall, Feb. 7–11 (Men's) | Manitoba Scotties | Kaitlyn Lawes | Beth Peterson | Viterra Championship | Team Carruthers | Braden Calvert |
| New Brunswick; Oromocto, Jan. 17–21 (Women's); Miramichi, Jan. 31 – Feb. 3 (Men's) | New Brunswick Scotties | Melissa Adams | Sylvie Quillian | New Brunswick Tankard | James Grattan | Rene Comeau |
| Newfoundland and Labrador; St. John's, Jan. 23–28 | Newfoundland and Labrador Scotties | Stacie Curtis | Brooke Godsland | Newfoundland and Labrador Tankard | Andrew Symonds | Greg Smith |
| Northern Ontario; Little Current, Jan. 24–28 | Northern Ontario Scotties | Krista McCarville | Krysta Burns | Northern Ontario; Men's Provincial Championship | Trevor Bonot | Tanner Horgan |
| Northwest Territories; Hay River, Jan. 17–22 (Women's); Inuvik, Jan. 25–26 (Men's) | Northwest Territories Scotties | Kerry Galusha | Sharon Cormier | NWT Men's Championship | Jamie Koe | Nick Saturnino |
| Nova Scotia; Halifax, Jan. 17–21 | Nova Scotia Scotties | Heather Smith | Christina Black | Nova Scotia Tankard | Matthew Manuel | Owen Purcell |
| Nunavut; Iqaluit, Dec. 14–17 | Nunavut Scotties | Cancelled | | Nunavut Mens Territorials | Shane Latimer | Wade Kingdon |
| Ontario; Dorchester, Jan. 22–28 | Ontario Scotties | Danielle Inglis | Carly Howard | Ontario Tankard | Scott Howard | Jayden King |
| Prince Edward Island; Summerside, Jan. 25–28 | Prince Edward Island Scotties | Jane DiCarlo | Amanda Power | Prince Edward Island Tankard | Tyler Smith | Jamie Newson |
| Quebec; Drummondville, Jan. 23–28 | Quebec Scotties | Laurie St-Georges | Noémie Verreault | Quebec Tankard | Jean-Michel Arsenault | Félix Asselin |
| Saskatchewan; Tisdale, Jan. 17–21 (Women's); Saskatoon, Jan. 31 – Feb. 4 (Men's) | Saskatchewan Scotties | Skylar Ackerman | Nancy Martin | SaskTel Tankard | Mike McEwen | Rylan Kleiter |
| Yukon; Whitehorse, Jan. 11–14 | Yukon Scotties | Bayly Scoffin | Patty Wallingham | Yukon Men's Championship | Thomas Scoffin | Dustin Mikkelsen; Tyler Williams |

== National championships ==
=== Australia ===
| Event | Gold | Silver | Bronze |
|---|---|---|---|
| Australian Men's Curling Championship; Naseby, New Zealand, Jun. 6–9 | Jay Merchant | Matt Panoussi | Ian Gagnon |
| Australian Women's Curling Championship; Naseby, New Zealand, Jun. 6–9 | Jennifer Westhagen | Helen Williams | Karen Titheridge |
| Australian Mixed Curling Championship; Naseby, New Zealand, Jun. 9–11 | Matt Panoussi | Dustin Armstrong | Hugh Millikin |
| Australian Mixed Doubles Curling Championship; Naseby, New Zealand, Sep. 18–20 | Tahli Gill / Dean Hewitt | Joanne Robins / Nathan Francey | - |
| Australian Senior Curling Championships; Naseby, New Zealand, Sep. 18–20 | David Imlah | Hugh Millikin | - |

=== Brazil ===
| Event | Gold | Silver | Bronze |
|---|---|---|---|
| Brazilian Mixed Doubles Curling Championship; São Paulo, Brazil, Sep. 29 –Oct. 1 | Elen Sumi / Arnaldo Yamashita | Fabiana Campos / Felipe Pires | Liége Mentz-Rosano / Sidinei Sassi |

=== Chinese Taipei ===
| Event | Gold | Silver | Bronze |
|---|---|---|---|
| Chinese Taipei Men's Curling Championship; Chaska, Minnesota, United States, Jun. 17–18 | Randie Shen | Victor Lee | Nelson Wang |

=== Czech Republic ===
| Event | Gold | Silver | Bronze |
|---|---|---|---|
| Czech Mixed Doubles Curling Championship; Prague, Feb. 9–13 | ASC Dukla (Zuzana Paulová / Tomáš Paul) | Dion WC (Julie Zelingrová / Vít Chabičovský) | Zbraslav K (Petra Klímová / Lukáš Klíma) |
| Czech Men's Curling Championship; Prague, Feb. 29 –Mar. 5 | Lukáš Klíma | Marek Bříza | Martin Blahovec |

=== Denmark ===
| Event | Gold | Silver | Bronze |
|---|---|---|---|
| Danish Mixed Doubles Curling Championship; Hvidovre, Feb. 9–11 | Lander / H. Holtermann | N. Wiksten / K. Wiksten | E. Holtermann / Jensen |
| Danish Women's Curling Championship; Gentofte, Apr. 5–7 | Madeleine Dupont | Katrine Schmidt | Klara Jakobsen |

=== England ===
| Event | Gold | Silver | Bronze |
|---|---|---|---|
| English Men's Curling Championship; Dumfries, Scotland, Feb. 22–25 | Rob Retchless | Fraser Clark | Andrew Reed |

=== Estonia ===
| Event | Gold | Silver | Bronze |
|---|---|---|---|
| Estonian Men's Curling Championship; Tallinn, Feb. 1–4 | "Team Veltsman": Eduard Veltsman, Janis Kiziridi, Konstantin Dotsenko, Igor Dzenzeljuk, alternate: Aleksander Andre | "Team Holm": Marten Padama, Karl Kukner, Tanel Toomväli, Kaarel Holm, alternate: Tarvin Kaldvee | "Team Jakobson": Andres Jakobson, Siim Sein, Olari Kalvik, Henry Grünberg, alternate: Tarmo Vähesoo |
| Estonian Women's Curling Championship; Tallinn, Feb. 1–4 | "Team Turmann": Erika Tuvike, Kerli Laidsalu, Liisa Turmann, Heili Grossmann | "Team Peebo": Margit Peebo, Ingrid Novikova, Küllike Ustav, Marcella Tammes, alternate: Evelyn Karro | - |
| Estonian Mixed Doubles Curling Championship; Tallinn, Feb. 29 – Mar. 3 | Marie Kaldvee / Harri Lill | Kaidi Elmik / Karl Kukner | Karoliine Kaare / Marten Padama |

(source:)

=== Finland ===
| Event | Gold | Silver | Bronze |
|---|---|---|---|
| Finnish Wheelchair Curling Championship; Harjavalta, Sep. 15–17 | Juha Rajala | Markku Karjalainen | Valeriina Silas |
| Finnish Wheelchair Mixed Doubles Curling Championship; Harjavalta, Jan. 5–7 | Harri Tuomaala / Ritva Lampinen | Teemu Klasila / Riitta Särösalo | Pekka Pälsynaho / Valeriina Silas |
| Finnish Women's Curling Championship; Åland, Feb. 16–18 | Janina Lindström | Miia Ahrenberg | Pia Varjola |
| Finnish Mixed Curling Championship; Joensuu, Apr. 11–14 | Jussi Uusipaavalniemi | Iikko Säntti | Ella Eivola |

=== Germany ===
| Event | Gold | Silver | Bronze |
|---|---|---|---|
| German Men's Curling Championship | Marc Muskatewitz | Sixten Totzek | Felix Schulze |
| German Women's Curling Championship | Emira Abbes | Sina Frey | Nicole Harder |

=== Italy ===
| Event | | Gold | Silver | Bronze |
|---|---|---|---|---|
| Italian Men's Curling Championship; Nov. 10 – Jan. 28, Feb. 7–11 | | Joël Retornaz | Giacomo Colli | Stefano Spiller |
| Italian Women's Curling Championship; Oct. 20 – Jan. 7, Feb. 7–11 | | Rebecca Mariani | Stefania Constantini | Veronica Zappone |
| Italian Mixed Doubles Curling Championship; Cortina d'Ampezzo, Mar. 7–10 | | Constantini / Arman | Zardini Lacedelli / De Zanna | Maloni / Colli |
| Italian Mixed Curling Championship; Pinerolo, Nov. 4 – Feb. 18 (RR), Turin, Mar. 16–17 (PO) | | Simone Gonin | Denise Pimpini | Barbara Gentile |
| Italian Junior Curling Championships; Oct. 23 - Mar. 3 (Q/RR), Cortina d'Ampezzo, Apr. 6-7 (PO) | M | Stefano Spiller | Stefano Gilli | Jacopo Scappin |
| Italian Junior Curling Championships; Oct. 23 - Mar. 3 (Q/RR), Cortina d'Ampezzo, Apr. 6-7 (PO) | W | Rebecca Mariani | Giada Zambelli | - |

=== Japan ===
| Event | | Gold | Silver | Bronze |
|---|---|---|---|---|
| Japan Curling Championships; Sapporo, Hokkaido, Jan. 28–Feb. 4 | M | (Hokkaido) Shinya Abe | (Nagano Prefecture) Riku Yanagisawa | (Hokkaido) Takumi Maeda |
| Japan Curling Championships; Sapporo, Hokkaido, Jan. 28–Feb. 4 | W | (Nagano Prefecture) Miyu Ueno | (Hokkaido) Miku Nihira | (Nagano Prefecture) Ikue Kitazawa |
| Japan Mixed Doubles Curling Championship; Karuizawa, Nagano, Feb. 26 – Mar. 3 | | (Nagano Prefecture) Ueno / Yamaguchi | (Hokkaido) Onodera / Maeda | (Yamanashi Prefecture) Koana / (Hokkaido) Aoki |

=== Latvia ===
| Event | | Gold | Silver | Bronze |
|---|---|---|---|---|
| Latvian Wheelchair Mixed Doubles Curling Championship; Riga, Nov. 27–30 | | Poļina Rožkova / Agris Lasmans | Gaļina Pavlova / Aleksandrs Dimbovskis | Linda Meijere / Ojārs Briedis |
| Latvian Mixed Doubles Curling Championship; Riga, Feb. 12-18 | | Dace Regža / Ansis Regža | Katrīna Gaidule / Roberts Reinis Buncis | Sabīne Jeske / Arnis Veidemanis |
| Latvian Junior Curling Championships; Riga, Mar. 11-17 | M | TKK/Zass (Kristaps Zass) | KKR/Buncis (Roberts Reinis Buncis) | VKK/Vieško (Valters Vieško) |
| Latvian Junior Curling Championships; Riga, Mar. 11-17 | W | JKK/Barone (Evelīna Barone) | SK OB/Regža (Agate Regža) | — |
| Latvian Mixed Curling Championship; Riga, Apr. 10-14 | | SK OB/Vonda (Krišs Vonda) | SK OB/Regža (Ansis Regža) | CC Riga/Veidemanis (Arnis Veidemanis) |
| Latvian Wheelchair Curling Championship; Riga, Apr. 23—24 | | KKR / Briedis (Ojārs Briedis) | Alliance / Dimbovskis (Aleksandrs Dimbovskis) | — |

=== New Zealand ===
| Event | Gold | Silver | Bronze |
|---|---|---|---|
| New Zealand Mixed Curling Championship; Auckland, Jun. 4–15 | Dave Watt | Brett Sargon | Iain Craig |
| New Zealand Men's Curling Championship; Naseby, Jun. 14–18 | Anton Hood | Sean Becker | Peter de Boer |
| New Zealand Women's Curling Championship; Naseby, Jun. 14–18 | Jessica Smith | Courtney Smith | Lucy Neilson |
| New Zealand Mixed Doubles Curling Championship; Naseby, Aug. 10–13 | Courtney Smith / Anton Hood | Jess Smith / Ben Smith | Mhairi-Bronté Duncan / Brett Sargon |
| New Zealand Junior Men's Championship; Naseby, Aug. 25–26 | Sam Flanagan | Darcy Nevill | William Becker |
| New Zealand Junior Women's Championship; Naseby, Aug. 25–26 | Ruby Kinney | Rachael Pitts | Tahlia Peterson |

=== Norway ===
| Event | Gold | Silver | Bronze |
|---|---|---|---|
| Norwegian Junior Curling Championships; Haugesund, Dec. 8–10 2023; It was an absolute championship, among both men's (6) and women's (2) teams, round robin only. | 1 Mosetertoppen Skiline/Høstmælingen (men's); Lillehammer CK (Lillehammer) (Lukas Høstmælingen, Tinius Haslev Nordbye, Magnus Lunde, Eskil Eriksen) | Lag OCE Mjøen (men's); Oppdal CK (Oppdal) (Markus D. Dale, Anders Mjøen, Emil S. Sæther, Jonathan S. Got, запасной: Erland S. Loe) | OCE Lag Bjørnstad (women's); Oppdal CK (Oppdal) (Torild Bjørnstad, Nora Østgård, Ingeborg Forbregd, Eilin Kjærland) |
| Norwegian Mixed Doubles Curling Championship; Lillehammer, Jan. 26–28 | Kristin Skaslien / Magnus Nedregotten | Martine Rønning / Mathias Brænden | Maia Ramsfjell / Magnus Ramsfjell |
| Norwegian Men's Curling Championship; Oslo, Mar. 7–10 | Magnus Nedregotten, Steffen Walstad, Håvard Vad Petersson, Torger Nergård, Markus Høiberg | Andreas Hårstad, Mathias Brænden, Michael Mellemseter, Wilhelm Næss, Emil M. Kvål | Magnus Ramsfjell, Martin Sesaker, Bendik Ramsfjell, Gaute Nepstad |
| Norwegian Women's Curling Championship; Oslo, Mar. 7–10 | Torild Bjørnstad, Nora Østgård, Ingeborg Forbregd, Eilin Kjærland | Kristin Skaslien, Marianne Rørvik, Mille Haslev Nordbye, Martine Rønning | Marina Hauser, Janne Fossen, Grethe Brenna, Randi Tørrissen |
| Norwegian Mixed Curling Championship; Oppdal, Apr. 26–28 | Grunde Buraas | Andreas Hårstad | Mathias Brænden |

(source:)

=== Poland ===
| Event | Gold | Silver | Bronze |
|---|---|---|---|
| Polish Mixed Doubles Championship; Łódź, Oct. 23–27 | Walczak / Augustyniak | Lipińska / Stych | Dyderska / Telak |

=== Russia ===
| Event | Gold | Silver | Bronze |
|---|---|---|---|
| Russian Mixed Curling Cup; Novosibirsk, Aug. 28 – Sep. 1 | Novosibirsk Oblast 1 (Ivan Kazachkov) | Irkutsk Oblast - Komsomoll 1 (Elizaveta Trukhina) | Moscow Oblast 1 (Mikhail Vaskov) |
| Russian Mixed Doubles Curling Cup; Novosibirsk, Sep. 4–7 | Saint Petersburg 2 Alina Kovaleva / Alexey Timofeev | Saint Petersburg 1 Nkeirouka Ezekh / Oleg Krasikov | Saint Petersburg 4 Anastasia Bryzgalova / Alexander Krushelnitskiy |
| Russian Wheelchair Mixed Doubles Curling Cup; Sochi, Sep. 29 - Oct. 4 | Moscow 3 Olga Verkhotina / Andrei Meshcheryakov) | Sevastopol (Natalia Kuzminova / Vladimir Lyubovich) | Moscow 1 (Alexandra Chechetkina / Alexander Shevchenko) |
| Russian Men's Curling Cup; Sochi, Dec. 4-8 | Saint Petersburg 1 (Alexey Timofeev) | Krasnodar Krai (Dmitry Mironov) | Moscow Oblast 1 (Alexander Eremin) |
| Russian Women's Curling Cup; Sochi, Dec. 11-15 | Saint Petersburg 1 (Alina Kovaleva) | Saint Petersburg 2 (Diana Margaryan) | Komsomoll - Irkutsk Oblast (Elizaveta Trukhina) |
| Russian Wheelchair Curling Cup; Novosibirsk, Dec. 16-22 | Team Moscow (Konstantin Kurokhtin) | Saint Petersburg 2 (Alexey Lyubimtsev) | Granit (Chelyabinsk Oblast) (Aleksey Fatuev) |
| Russian Mixed Doubles Curling Championship; Sochi, Jan. 17–21 | Komsomoll 3 - Irkutsk Oblast; Elizaveta Trukhina / Nikolay Lysakov | Saint Petersburg 2 Alina Kovaleva / Alexey Timofeev | Krasnodar Krai 1 Viktoria Enbaeva / Dmitry Mironov |
| Russian Wheelchair Mixed Doubles Curling Championship; Sochi, Jan. 29 - Feb. 5 | Krasnoyarsk Krai (Olesya Chernykh / Maxim Krasnov) | Krasnodar Krai 1 (Tatyana Starkova / Andrey Smirnov) | Saint Petersburg 1 (Anna Karpushina / Alexey Lyubimtsev) |
| Russian Women's Curling Championship; Sochi, Apr. 6–14 | Moscow Oblast 1 (Irina Riazanova) | Saint Petersburg 2 (Diana Margarian) | Saint Petersburg 3 (Irina Nizovtseva) |
| Russian Men's Curling Championship; Sochi, Apr. 15–21 | Saint Petersburg 1 (Alexey Timofeev) | Krasnodar Krai (Sergey Glukhov) | Irkutsk Oblast - Komsomoll (Nikolay Lysakov) |
| Russian Wheelchair Curling Championship; Novosibirsk, Apr. 22–30 | Moscow (Konstantin Kurokhtin) | Saint Petersburg (Alexey Lyubimtsev) | Samara Oblast (Igor Ruzheinikov) |
| Russian Mixed Curling Championship; Irkutsk, May 14–20 | Moscow Oblast 1 (Alexander Eremin) | Team Moscow (Timofey Nasonov) | Krasnoyarsk Krai (Anna Samoylik) |

=== Scotland ===
| Event | | Gold | Silver | Bronze |
|---|---|---|---|---|
| Scottish Junior Curling Championships; Aberdeen, Nov. 10-15 | M | Orrin Carson | Jack Strawhorn | Ross Craik |
| Scottish Junior Curling Championships; Aberdeen, Nov. 10-15 | W | Robyn Munro | Callie Soutar | Tia Laurie |
| Scottish Mixed Curling Championship; Forfar, Jan. 19-21 | | Neil Kennedy | Billy Morton | David Reid |
| Scottish Men's Curling Championship; Dumfries, Feb. 4-10 | | Ross Whyte | James Craik | Bruce Mouat |
| Scottish Women's Curling Championship; Dumfries, Feb. 4-10 | | Fay Henderson | Rebecca Morrison | Robyn Munro |
| Scottish Senior Curling Championships; Hamilton, Feb. 15-18 | M | Hammy McMillan | Graham Cormack | Graeme Connal |
| Scottish Senior Curling Championships; Hamilton, Feb. 15-18 | W | Gail Thomson | Jackie Lockhart | Susan Wyllie |
| Scottish Mixed Doubles Curling Championship; Perth, Feb. 20-25 | | Sophie Jackson / Duncan McFadzean | Lisa Davie / Mark Watt | Rebecca Morrison / Kyle Waddell |

=== South Korea ===
| Event | Gold | Silver | Bronze |
|---|---|---|---|
| Korean Men's Curling Championship; Gangneung, Jun. 22–30 | Park Jong-duk | Jeong Byeong-jin | Kim Soo-hyuk |
| Korean Women's Curling Championship; Gangneung, Jun. 22–30 | Gim Eun-ji | Kim Eun-jung | Ha Seung-youn |
| Korean Mixed Doubles Curling Championship; Uijeongbu, Jul. 23–31 | J. Kim / B. Jeong | H. Kim / Yoo | S. Kim / Y. Jeong |

=== Sweden ===
| Event | | Gold | Silver | Bronze |
|---|---|---|---|---|
| Swedish Mixed Doubles Curling Championship; Gävle, Nov. 30 – Dec. 3 | | (Gävleborg County) CK Granit (Andersson / Granbom) | (Västernorrland County) Härnösands CK (Sarén / Palm) | (Uppland) IK Fyris (Bergman / Hanna) |
| Swedish Senior Curling Championships; Östersund, Jan. 10–14 | M | Sundbybergs CK (Wranå) | Sundbybergs CK (Julius) | Danderyds CK (Wikström) (Västernorrland County) Härnösands CK (Prytz) |
| Swedish Senior Curling Championships; Östersund, Jan. 10–14 | W | (Västernorrland County) Härnösands CK (Norberg) | (Gävleborg County) CK Granit (Noreen) | (Östergötland) Norrköpings CK (Persson) |
| Swedish Men's Curling Championship; Jönköping, Jan. 31 – Feb. 4 | | (Västerbotten) Fredrik Nyman | (Gävleborg County) Simon Granbom | (Östergötland) Axel Rosander (Västerbotten) Johan Nygren |
| Swedish Women's Curling Championship; Jönköping, Jan. 31 – Feb. 4 | | Anna Hasselborg | Isabella Wranå | (Småland) Emma Moberg |
| Swedish Wheelchair Curling Championship; Jönköping, Jan. 31 – Feb. 4 | | (Västernorrland County) Härnösands CK (Ulander) | (Västernorrland County) Amatörföreningens CK (Wilhelm) | (Småland) Jönköpings CC (Pettersson) |

=== Switzerland ===
| Event | | Gold | Silver | Bronze |
|---|---|---|---|---|
| Swiss Mixed Doubles Wheelchair Curling Championship; Wetzikon, Jan. 19–21 | | (Canton of Bern) Bern 3 (von Gunten / Burgener) | (Canton of Geneva) Genève 1 (Champion / Kneubühl) | (Canton of Bern) Bern 2 (Villars / Tercier) |
| Swiss Men's Curling Championship; Thônex, Feb. 5–10 | | (Canton of Geneva) Yannick Schwaller | (Canton of St. Gallen) Andrin Schnider | (Canton of Bern) Michael Brunner |
| Swiss Women's Curling Championship; Thônex, Feb. 6–10 | | (Aargau) Silvana Tirinzoni | (Canton of Zurich) Xenia Schwaller | (Canton of Lucerne) Roxanne Heritier |
| Swiss Senior Curling Championships men: St. Gallen, Feb. 15–18, women: Küssnacht am Rigi, Feb. 16–18 | M | (Grisons) Christof Schwaller | (Grisons) Stefan Karnusian | (Canton of Zurich) Dieter Wüest |
| Swiss Senior Curling Championships men: St. Gallen, Feb. 15–18, women: Küssnacht am Rigi, Feb. 16–18 | W | (Vaud) Daniela Ruetschi-Schlegel | (Canton of Zurich) Dagmar Frei | (Canton of Bern) Nicole Strausak |
| Swiss Mixed Doubles Curling Championship; Biel/Bienne, Feb. 28 – Mar. 3 | | (Canton of Bern) Schwaller-Hürlimann / Schwaller | (Canton of Bern) Howald / Lachat | (Canton of Zurich) Pätz / Michel |

=== United States ===
| Event | | Gold | Silver | Bronze |
|---|---|---|---|---|
| United States Wheelchair Mixed Doubles Curling Championship; Fort Wayne, Indiana, Jan. 4–7 | | (Minnesota) Oyuna Uranchimeg / Matt Thums | (Wisconsin) Laura Dwyer / Steve Emt | (Wisconsin) Penny Ricker / Shawn Sadowski |
| United States Men's Curling Championship; East Rutherford, New Jersey, Jan. 29 – Feb. 4 | | (Minnesota) John Shuster | (Minnesota) Korey Dropkin | (Minnesota) Daniel Casper |
| United States Women's Curling Championship; East Rutherford, New Jersey, Jan. 29 – Feb. 4 | | (Minnesota) Tabitha Peterson | (Minnesota) Sarah Anderson | (Michigan) Delaney Strouse |
| United States Mixed Doubles Curling Championship; Traverse City, Michigan, Feb. 27 – Mar. 3 | | (Wisconsin) B. Hamilton / M. Hamilton | (Minnesota) Thiesse / Dropkin | (Minnesota) Geving / Shuster |
| United States Junior Curling Championships (U21); Eau Claire, Wisconsin, Mar. 25–30 | M | (Massachusetts) Nicholas Cenzalli | (Wisconsin) Caden Hebert | (Minnesota) Mason Guentzel |
| United States Junior Curling Championships (U21); Eau Claire, Wisconsin, Mar. 25–30 | W | (Minnesota) Allie Giroux | (Minnesota) Allory Johnson | (Minnesota) Ava Schapman |

(source :)

== Tour events ==
=== Teams ===
See: List of teams in the 2023–24 curling season

=== Men's events ===
| Week | Event | Winning skip | Runner-up skip | Purse | Winner's share | Tour | SFM |
|---|---|---|---|---|---|---|---|
| 1 | Morioka Ice Rink Memorial Cup; Morioka, Japan, June 3–4 | (Japan) Kouki Tonuma | (Japan) Kotaro Noguchi | ¥195,000 | ¥80,000 | World Curling Japan | 0.5000 |
| 2 | Hokkaido Bank Curling Classic; Sapporo, Japan, Aug. 3–6 | (Japan) Kohsuke Hirata | (South Korea) Park Jong-duk | ¥1,700,000 | ¥1,000,000 | Hokkaido Curling | 3.0000 |
| 3 | Wakkanai Midori Challenge Cup; Wakkanai, Japan, Aug. 10–13 | (Japan) Yusuke Morozumi | (Japan) Hayato Sato | ¥1,700,000 | ¥1,000,000 | Hokkaido Curling | 2.5000 |
| 4 | Baden Masters; Baden, Switzerland, Aug. 18–20 | (Italy) Joël Retornaz | (Scotland) Cameron Bryce | CHF 35,000 | CHF 12,000 | World Curling | 6.0000 |
| 4 | Argo Graphics Cup; Kitami, Japan, Aug. 17–20 | (Japan) Yusuke Morozumi | (Japan) Kohsuke Hirata | ¥1,700,000 | ¥1,000,000 | Hokkaido Curling | 2.0000 |
| 5 | Euro Super Series; Stirling, Scotland, Aug. 24–27 | (Scotland) Bruce Mouat | (Scotland) Ross Whyte | £20,000 | £6,000 | — | 6.0000 |
| 5 | Alberta Tour-Kick off Leduc, Alberta, Aug. 24–27 | (Alberta) Aaron Sluchinski | (United States) Daniel Casper | CA$10,000 | CA$5,000 | Curling Stadium Alberta Curling | 3.0000 |
| 5 | Summer Series; Saint-Félicien, Quebec, Aug. 24–27 | (Nova Scotia) Owen Purcell | (Quebec) Yannick Martel | CA$16,000 | CA$5,500 | Ontario Curling; Quebec Provincial Circuit | 2.5000 |
| 5 | ADVICS Cup; Kitami, Japan, Aug. 24–27 | (Japan) Shinya Abe | (Japan) Hayato Sato | ¥1,700,000 | ¥1,000,000 | Hokkaido Curling | 2.0000 |
| 5 | Icebreaker Challenge; Morris, Manitoba, Aug. 25–27 | Cancelled | | | | | |
| 6 | Oslo Cup; Oslo, Norway, Aug. 31 – Sep. 3 | (Switzerland) Marco Hösli | (Switzerland) Yannick Schwaller | kr 112,000 | kr 40,000 | Nordic Curling | 5.5000 |
| 7 | Stu Sells Oakville Tankard; Oakville, Ontario, Sep. 8–11 | (Scotland) Bruce Mouat | (Scotland) Ross Whyte | CA$30,000 | CA$8,000 | Stu Sells Ontario Curling | 5.5000 |
| 7 | Saville Shootout; Edmonton, Alberta, Sep. 8–11 | (Alberta) Brendan Bottcher | (British Columbia) Catlin Schneider | CA$25,000 | CA$6,000 | Curling Stadium Alberta Curling | 4.5000 |
| 7 | MCT Challenge; Winnipeg, Manitoba, Sep. 8–10 | (Manitoba) Sean Grassie | (United States) Jed Brundidge | CA$5,500 | CA$2,000 | Manitoba Curling | 1.0000 |
| 8 | Alberta Curling Series Major; Beaumont, Alberta, Sep. 14–18 | (Alberta) Aaron Sluchinski | (Germany) Marc Muskatewitz | CA$30,000 | CA$9,000 | Curling Stadium Alberta Curling | 5.5000 |
| 8 | KW Fall Classic; Waterloo, Ontario, Sep. 14–17 | (Ontario) Alex Champ | (Switzerland) Yves Stocker | CA$12,500 | CA$3,500 | Ontario Curling | 3.0000 |
| 8 | Mother Club Fall Curling Classic; Winnipeg, Manitoba, Sep. 14–17 | (Japan) Takumi Maeda | (Manitoba) Jordon McDonald | CA$7,600 | CA$1,700 | Manitoba Curling | 2.0000 |
| 9 | AMJ Campbell Shorty Jenkins Classic; Cornwall, Ontario, Sep. 20–24 | (Scotland) Ross Whyte | (Sweden) Niklas Edin | CA$60,000 | CA$15,000 | Ontario Curling | 6.5000 |
| 9 | ATB Okotoks Classic; Okotoks, Alberta, Sep. 22–24 | (Alberta) Brendan Bottcher | (Alberta) Kevin Koe | CA$50,000 | CA$14,000 | Alberta Curling | 6.0000 |
| 9 | US Open of Curling; Blaine, Minnesota, Sep. 21–24 | (United States) Daniel Casper | (United States) Andrew Stopera | US$8,000 | US$3,000 | Curling Stadium Ontario Curling | 2.0000 |
| 9 | Great Western Brewing Bonspiel; Saskatoon, Saskatchewan, Sep. 22–24 | (Saskatchewan) Jason Jacobson | (Saskatchewan) Kelly Knapp | CA$5,160 | CA$2,000 | Sask Curling | 2.0000 |
| 9 | Rick Rowsell Classic; St. John's, Newfoundland and Labrador, Sep. 21–24 | (Newfoundland and Labrador) Nathan Young | (Newfoundland and Labrador) Andrew Symonds | CA$14,000 | CA$5,000 | — | 1.0000 |
| 9 | Capital Curling Fall Men's; Ottawa, Ontario, Sep. 21–24 | (Ontario) Jayden King | (Ontario) J. P. Lachance | CA$10,400 | CA$3,000 | Ontario Curling | 1.0000 |
| 10 | Prestige Hotels & Resorts Curling Classic; Vernon, British Columbia, Sep. 29 – Oct. 1 | (British Columbia) Brent Pierce | (British Columbia) Catlin Schneider | CA$28,500 | CA$6,000 | Curling Stadium British Columbia Curling | 2.5000 |
| 10 | Tallinn Men's International Challenger; Tallinn, Estonia, Sep. 28 – Oct. 1 | (Switzerland) Yves Stocker | (Sweden) Fredrik Nyman | €3,000 | €1,200 | World Curling | 2.5000 |
| 10 | Invitation Valleyfield; Salaberry-de-Valleyfield, Quebec, Sep. 28 – Oct. 1 | (Quebec) Jean-Michel Arsenault | (Quebec) Félix Asselin | CA$10,000 | CA$2,500 | Ontario Curling; Quebec Provincial Circuit | 1.5000 |
| 10 | St. Vital U25 Bonspiel; Winnipeg, Manitoba, Sep. 29 – Oct. 1 | Cancelled | | | | | |
| 11 | Stu Sells Tankard; Barrie, Ontario, Oct. 5–9 | (Japan) Yusuke Morozumi | (South Korea) Jeong Byeong-jin | CA$30,000 | CA$10,000 | Stu Sells Ontario Curling | 5.0000 |
| 11 | McKee Homes Fall Curling Classic; Airdrie, Alberta, Oct. 6–9 | (China) Fei Xueqing | (Alberta) Ryan Parent | CA$12,000 | CA$3,200 | Alberta Curling | 1.5000 |
| 11 | Capital Curling Classic; Ottawa, Ontario, Oct. 6–8 | (Quebec) François Roberge | (Quebec) Yannick Martel | CA$6,000 | CA$1,600 | Ontario Curling | 1.5000 |
| 11 | Regina Highland SaskTour Spiel; Regina, Saskatchewan, Oct. 6–9 | (Saskatchewan) Dustin Kalthoff | (Saskatchewan) Josh Heidt | CA$9,000 | CA$3,000 | Sask Curling | 1.5000 |
| 11 | New Scotland Brewing Co. Mens Cashspiel; Halifax, Nova Scotia, Oct. 6–8 | (New Brunswick) James Grattan | (Nova Scotia) Nick Mosher | CA$4,000 | CA$2,000 | — | 1.0000 |
| 11 | Men Prague Open; Prague, Czech Republic, Oct. 5–8 | (Italy) Fabio Ribotta | (Philippines) Marc Pfister | €4,000 | €1,500 | World Curling | 0.5000 |
| 11 | Mineba Mitsumi Cup; Miyota, Japan, Oct. 7–9 | Cancelled | | | | | |
| 12 | Insitu Players Open; Dundas, Ontario, Oct. 12–15 | (Alberta) Brendan Bottcher | (Alberta) Kevin Koe | CA$70,000 | CA$20,000 | Players | 7.0000 |
| 12 | Stroud Sleeman Cash Spiel; Stroud, Ontario, Oct. 12–15 | (Ontario) Pat Ferris | (Ontario) Jayden King | CA$12,800 | CA$3,800 | Ontario Curling | 3.0000 |
| 12 | S3 Group Curling Stadium Series; Swift Current, Saskatchewan, Oct. 13–15 | (Saskatchewan) Josh Bryden | (Saskatchewan) Kelly Knapp | CA$7,500 | CA$2,400 | Curling Stadium Sask Curling | 2.0000 |
| 12 | Match Town Trophy; Jönköping, Sweden, Oct. 12–15 | (Denmark) Mikkel Krause | (Norway) Andreas Hårstad | kr 48,000 | kr 24,000 | Nordic Curling | 1.5000 |
| 12 | St. Paul Cashspiel; St. Paul, Minnesota, Oct. 13–15 | (United States) Daniel Casper | (United States) Rich Ruohonen | US$11,000 | US$5,000 | Ontario Curling | 1.0000 |
| 12 | MCT Shootout; Selkirk, Manitoba, Oct. 13–15 | (Manitoba) Jordon McDonald | (Manitoba) Braden Calvert | CA$5,500 | CA$2,000 | Manitoba Curling | 1.0000 |
| 12 | Alberta Curling Series: Event 1 Beaumont, Alberta, Oct. 13–15 | (Japan) Kohsuke Hirata | (Alberta) Andrew Dunbar | CA$5,625 | CA$2,200 | Curling Stadium Alberta Curling Series | 1.0000 |
| 13 | Hearing Life Tour Challenge Tier 1 Niagara Falls, Ontario, Oct. 17–22 | (Italy) Joël Retornaz | (Alberta) Brendan Bottcher | CA$175,000 | CA$32,000 | Grand Slam | 10.0000 |
| 13 | Hearing Life Tour Challenge Tier 2 Niagara Falls, Ontario, Oct. 17–22 | (United States) Daniel Casper | (Japan) Yusuke Morozumi | CA$60,000 | CA$9,500 | Grand Slam | 5.5000 |
| 13 | Dave Jones Stanhope Simpson Mayflower Cashspiel; Halifax, Nova Scotia, Oct. 19–22 | (New Brunswick) James Grattan | (New Brunswick) Zach Eldridge | CA$16,700 | CA$3,000 | — | 1.5000 |
| 13 | Atkins Curling Supplies Classic; Winnipeg, Manitoba, Oct. 20–22 | (Manitoba) Braden Calvert | (Manitoba) Steve Irwin | CA$9,500 | CA$2,000 | Manitoba Curling | 1.5000 |
| 13 | King Cash Spiel; Maple Ridge, British Columbia, Oct. 20–22 | (British Columbia) Jason Montgomery | (British Columbia) Jeff Richard | CA$12,800 | CA$4,000 | British Columbia Curling | 1.5000 |
| 13 | Saville U25 Challenge; Edmonton, Alberta, Oct. 20–22 | (Alberta) Cole Adams | (Alberta) Adam Elsenheimer | CA$5,500 | CA$1,800 | Curling Stadium Alberta Curling | 1.5000 |
| 13 | Royal Kingston Fall Curling Classic; Kingston, Ontario, Oct. 21–22 | Cancelled | | | | | |
| 14 | Soo Curlers Fall Classic; Sault Ste. Marie, Ontario, Oct. 26–29 | (Manitoba) Matt Dunstone | (Italy) Joël Retornaz | CA$90,000 | CA$23,000 | Curling Stadium Ontario Curling | 4.0000 |
| 14 | Grand Prix Bern Inter Curling Challenge; Bern, Switzerland, Oct. 27–29 | (Scotland) James Craik | (Germany) Benny Kapp | CHF 18,100 | CHF 5,000 | World Curling | 4.0000 |
| 14 | Saville Grand Prix; Edmonton, Alberta, Oct. 27–30 | (Alberta) Ryan Jacques | (Alberta) Scott Webb | CA$12,500 | CA$4,000 | Curling Stadium Alberta Curling | 1.0000 |
| 14 | Kamloops Crown of Curling; Kamloops, British Columbia, Oct. 27–29 | (British Columbia) Brent Pierce | (British Columbia) Kyler Kleibrink | CA$12,000 | CA$3,000 | British Columbia Curling | 1.0000 |
| 14 | Sundbyberg Open; Sundbyberg, Sweden, Oct. 27–29 | (Denmark) Mikkel Krause | (Sweden) Axel Landelius | kr 29,000 | kr 19,000 | Nordic Curling | 1.0000 |
| 14 | Challenge Nord-Ouest Air Creebec/Agnico Eagle; Val-d'Or, Quebec, Oct. 26–29 | (Quebec) Yannick Martel | (Quebec) Robert Desjardins | CA$15,000 | CA$3,100 | Ontario Curling; Quebec Provincial Circuit | 0.5000 |
| 15 | Swiss Cup Basel; Basel, Switzerland, Nov. 3–5 | (Scotland) Cameron Bryce | (Switzerland) Yves Stocker | CHF 24,000 | CHF 9,000 | — | 5.0000 |
| 15 | Stu Sells 1824 Halifax Classic; Halifax, Nova Scotia, Nov. 1–5 | (Quebec) Félix Asselin | (Ontario) Sam Mooibroek | CA$25,000 | CA$8,000 | Stu Sells | 3.0000 |
| 15 | Danish Open; Copenhagen, Denmark, Nov. 2–5 | (Scotland) Ross Craik | (Denmark) Mikkel Krause | kr. 32,000 | kr. 16,000 | Nordic Curling | 1.0000 |
| 15 | Alberta Curling Series: Event 2 Leduc, Alberta, Nov. 3–5 | (Alberta) Daylan Vavrek | (Saskatchewan) Scott Manners | CA$5,000 | CA$2,000 | Curling Stadium Alberta Curling Series | 1.0000 |
| 15 | Capital Curling Valley Open; Carleton Place, Ontario, Nov. 3–5 | (Ontario) Jordan McNamara | (Ontario) Sam Steep | CA$7,500 | CA$1,600 | Ontario Curling | 0.5000 |
| 15 | Blazing Leaves; Bridgeport, Connecticut, Nov. 2–5 | Cancelled | | | | | |
| 16 | KIOTI National; Westville Road, Nova Scotia, Nov. 7–12 | (Italy) Joël Retornaz | (Sweden) Niklas Edin | CA$200,000 | CA$42,000 | Grand Slam | 10.0000 |
| 16 | Original 16 Mens Cashspiel; Calgary, Alberta, Nov. 10–12 | (Saskatchewan) Mike McEwen | (United States) Scott Dunnam | CA$24,000 | CA$6,000 | Alberta Curling | 3.0000 |
| 16 | COMCO Cash Spiel; Stroud, Ontario, Nov. 10–12 | (Ontario) Sam Mooibroek | (Ontario) Dayna Deruelle | CA$8,400 | CA$2,500 | Ontario Curling | 1.5000 |
| 16 | MCT Curling Cup; Winnipeg, Manitoba, Nov. 10–12 | (Manitoba) Brett Walter | (Manitoba) Riley Smith | CA$6,000 | CA$2,500 | Manitoba Curling | 1.5000 |
| 16 | Island Shootout; Victoria, British Columbia, Nov. 10–13 | (British Columbia) Jason Montgomery | (British Columbia) Kyler Kleibrink | CA$10,000 | CA$3,500 | British Columbia Curling | 1.0000 |
| 16 | Prague Classic; Prague, Czech Republic, Nov. 9–12 | (Czech Republic) Lukáš Klíma | (Turkey) Uğurcan Karagöz | €13,500 | €4,100 | World Curling | — |
| 17 | Pumps and Pressure Red Deer Curling Classic; Red Deer, Alberta, Nov. 17–20 | (Alberta) Kevin Koe | (Saskatchewan) Rylan Kleiter | CA$35,000 | CA$10,000 | Alberta Curling | 6.0000 |
| 17 | Curl Mesabi Classic; Eveleth, Minnesota, Nov. 17–19 | (Ontario) Tanner Horgan | (United States) Daniel Casper | US$25,000 | US$5,480 | — | 2.0000 |
| 17 | Stu Sells Port Elgin Superspiel; Port Elgin, Ontario, Nov. 17–19 | (Ontario) Mark Kean | (Ontario) Pat Ferris | CA$11,100 | CA$3,000 | Stu Sells Ontario Curling | 2.0000 |
| 17 | Curling Stadium Martensville SaskTour Series; Martensville, Saskatchewan, Nov. 17–19 | (Saskatchewan) Bruce Korte | (Saskatchewan) Kelly Knapp | CA$8,700 | CA$2,150 | Curling Stadium Sask Curling | 1.5000 |
| 17 | Jim Sullivan Curling Classic; Fredericton, New Brunswick, Nov. 17–19 | (Nova Scotia) Nick Mosher | (New Brunswick) Zach Eldridge | CA$15,300 | CA$5,000 | — | 0.5000 |
| 17 | Finale du Circuit; Sorel-Tracy, Quebec, Nov. 17–19 | (Quebec) Yannick Martel | (Quebec) Jean-Michel Arsenault | CA$8,350 | CA$2,200 | Quebec Provincial Circuit | 0.5000 |
| 18 | Stu Sells Living Waters Collingwood Classic; Collingwood, Ontario, Nov. 24–26 | (Ontario) John Epping | (Ontario) Sam Mooibroek | CA$14,000 | CA$5,700 | Stu Sells Ontario Curling | 2.5000 |
| 18 | Nutana SaskTour Men's Spiel; Saskatoon, Saskatchewan, Nov. 24–26 | (Saskatchewan) Kelly Knapp | (Saskatchewan) Rylan Kleiter | CA$6,780 | CA$2,035 | Sask Curling | 2.5000 |
| 18 | Challenge de Curling Desjardins; Clermont, Quebec, Nov. 23–26 | (Quebec) Jean-Michel Arsenault | (Nova Scotia) Paul Flemming | CA$25,000 | CA$8,000 | — | 2.0000 |
| 18 | Mile Zero Cash Spiel; Dawson Creek, British Columbia, Nov. 24–26 | (Japan) Kohsuke Hirata | (British Columbia) Brad Thompson | CA$16,500 | CA$5,000 | British Columbia Curling | 1.5000 |
| 18 | MCT Showdown; East St. Paul, Manitoba, Nov. 24–26 | (Manitoba) Jordon McDonald | (Manitoba) Thomas McGillivray | CA$5,500 | CA$2,000 | Manitoba Curling | 1.0000 |
| 18 | PEI Brewing Company; Summerside, Prince Edward Island, Nov. 24–26 | (Prince Edward Island) Tyler Smith | (New Brunswick) Rene Comeau | CA$3,200 | CA$1,600 | — | 0.5000 |
| 18 | Capital Curling Rideau Open; Ottawa, Ontario, Nov. 24–26 | (Quebec) Jean-Michel Ménard | (Ontario) Chris Gardner | CA$9,200 | CA$1,500 | Ontario Curling | — |
| 19 | Nufloors Penticton Curling Classic; Penticton, British Columbia, Nov. 30–Dec. 4 | (Ontario) Glenn Howard (Note: Glenn Howard missed the playoffs and one preliminary game due to injury. The team played with three players without him, and was skipped by Scott Howard.) | (United States) Chris Plys | CA$100,000 | CA$20,000 | British Columbia Curling | 6.0000 |
| 19 | DeKalb Superspiel; Morris, Manitoba, Dec. 1–4 | (Ontario) Tanner Horgan | (Manitoba) Braden Calvert | CA$30,000 | CA$10,000 | Manitoba Curling | 4.0000 |
| 19 | Karuizawa International; Karuizawa, Japan, Dec. 1–3 | (Newfoundland and Labrador) Brad Gushue | (Japan) Hayato Sato | ¥1,500,000 | ¥800,000 | — | 3.5000 |
| 19 | Stu Sells Brantford Nissan Classic; Brantford, Ontario, Dec. 1–4 | (Quebec) Félix Asselin | (Ontario) Sam Mooibroek | CA$15,000 | CA$5,000 | Stu Sells Ontario Curling | 3.5000 |
| 19 | Alberta Curling Series: Event 3 Beaumont, Alberta, Dec. 1–3 | (Alberta) Ryan Parent | (Northwest Territories) Jamie Koe | CA$8,125 | CA$2,700 | Curling Stadium Alberta Curling Series | 1.0000 |
| 20 | Nutrien Ag Solutions Western Showdown; Swift Current, Saskatchewan, Dec. 7–10 | (Switzerland) Yannick Schwaller | (Switzerland) Michael Brunner | CA$46,000 | CA$14,000 | Curling Stadium | 6.0000 |
| 20 | Aberdeen Classic; Aberdeen, Scotland, Dec. 8–10 | (Germany) Benny Kapp | (Switzerland) Yves Stocker | £3,000 | £2,000 | — | 2.5000 |
| 20 | Superstore Monctonian Challenge; Moncton, New Brunswick, Dec. 8–10 | (Quebec) Jean-Michel Arsenault | (Nova Scotia) Stuart Thompson | CA$12,400 | CA$2,000 | — | 1.5000 |
| 21 | WFG Masters; Saskatoon, Saskatchewan, Dec. 12–17 | (Italy) Joël Retornaz | (Scotland) Ross Whyte | CA$200,000 | CA$38,000 | Grand Slam | 10.0000 |
| 21 | Scott Comfort Re/Max Blue Chip Bonspiel; Wadena, Saskatchewan, Dec. 15–17 | (Saskatchewan) Kelly Knapp | (Saskatchewan) Jason Jacobson | CA$8,025 | CA$1,925 | Sask Curling | 1.5000 |
| 21 | WCT Łódź Men's International; Łódź, Poland, Dec. 15–17 | (Italy) Fabio Ribotta | (Sweden) Fredrik Nyman | €4,000 | €1,200 | World Curling | 0.5000 |
| 24 | Mercure Perth Masters; Perth, Scotland, Jan. 4–7 | (Scotland) Bruce Mouat | (Scotland) Ross Whyte | £17,000 | £7,000 | — | 5.0000 |
| 24 | SaskTour Mens Players Championship; Yorkton, Saskatchewan, Jan. 5–7 | (Saskatchewan) Kelly Knapp | (Saskatchewan) Steve Laycock | CA$12,600 | CA$2,365 | Sask Curling | 2.0000 |
| 24 | Performance Kia Charity Open; Thunder Bay, Ontario, Jan. 5–7 | (Manitoba) Jordon McDonald | (Ontario) Krista McCarville* | CA$11,000 | CA$3,000 | Ontario Curling | 0.5000 |
| 25 | Astec Safety Challenge; Lloydminster, Saskatchewan, Jan. 10–14 | (Alberta) Kevin Koe | (Manitoba) Reid Carruthers | CA$102,000 | CA$26,000 | Players | 7.0000 |
| 25 | Duluth Cash Spiel; Duluth, Minnesota, Jan. 12–14 | (United States) Joe Polo | (United States) Ethan Sampson | US$12,000 | US$3,600 | Ontario Curling | 2.5000 |
| 25 | MCT Championships; Winnipeg, Manitoba, Jan. 12–14 | (Manitoba) Braden Calvert | (Manitoba) Brett Walter | CA$5,500 | CA$2,000 | Manitoba Curling | 1.5000 |
| 26 | Co-op Canadian Open; Red Deer, Alberta, Jan. 16–21 | (Scotland) Bruce Mouat | (Alberta) Brendan Bottcher | CA$200,000 | CA$26,000 | Grand Slam | 10.0000 |
| 26 | Ed Werenich Golden Wrench Classic; Tempe, Arizona, Jan. 18–21 | (Alberta) Karsten Sturmay | (United States) John Shuster | US$14,400 | US$6,000 | — | 3.0000 |
| 26 | St. Galler Elite Challenge; St. Gallen, Switzerland, Jan. 18–21 | (Scotland) Cameron Bryce | (Scotland) Kyle Waddell | CHF 6,200 | CHF 2,000 | World Curling | 3.0000 |
| 27 | WCT Belgium Men's Challenger; Zemst, Belgium, Jan. 25–28 | (Finland) Matias Hanninen | (Belgium) Timothy Verreycken | €2,800 | €1,200 | World Curling | 0.5000 |
| 30 | Sun City Cup; Karlstad, Sweden, Feb. 15–18 | (Netherlands) Wouter Gösgens | (Scotland) Cameron Bryce | kr 55,000 | kr 25,000 | Nordic Curling Tour | 3.0000 |
| 31 | Tournoi Hommes Circuit Provincial; Maniwaki, Quebec, Feb. 23–25 | (Quebec) Yannick Martel | (Quebec) Normand Bornais | CA$10,000 | CA$4,000 | Quebec Provincial Circuit | 0.5000 |
| 34 | Aberdeen International Curling Championship; Edinburgh, Scotland, Mar. 14–17 | (Scotland) Bruce Mouat | (United States) John Shuster | £6,000 | £2,500 | — | 5.5000 |
| 38 | Princess Auto Players' Championship; Toronto, Ontario, Apr. 9–14 | (Newfoundland and Labrador) Brad Gushue | (Italy) Joël Retornaz | CA$175,000 | CA$55,000 | Grand Slam | 10.0000 |

* Women's team

=== Women's events ===
| Week | Event | Winning skip | Runner-up skip | Purse | Winner's share | Tour | SFM |
|---|---|---|---|---|---|---|---|
| 1 | Morioka City Womens Memorial Cup; Morioka, Japan, July 1–2 | Cancelled | | | | | |
| 2 | Hokkaido Bank Curling Classic; Sapporo, Japan, Aug. 3–6 | (Japan) Yuna Kotani | (Japan) Momoha Tabata | ¥1,700,000 | ¥1,000,000 | Hokkaido Curling | 2.5000 |
| 3 | Wakkanai Midori Challenge Cup; Wakkanai, Japan, Aug. 10–13 | (Japan) Yuna Kotani | (Japan) Kohane Tsuruga | ¥1,700,000 | ¥1,000,000 | Hokkaido Curling | 1.5000 |
| 4 | Euro Super Series; Stirling, Scotland, Aug. 17–20 | (United States) Delaney Strouse | (Italy) Stefania Constantini | £20,000 | £6,000 | — | 3.5000 |
| 5 | Summer Series; Saint-Félicien, Quebec, Aug. 24–27 | (Ontario) Danielle Inglis | (Nova Scotia) Christina Black | CA$16,000 | CA$5,500 | Ontario Curling | 3.5000 |
| 5 | ADVICS Cup; Kitami, Japan, Aug. 24–27 | (Japan) Satsuki Fujisawa | (Japan) Ikue Kitazawa | ¥1,700,000 | ¥1,000,000 | Hokkaido Curling | 3.0000 |
| 5 | Alberta Tour-Kick off Leduc, Alberta, Aug. 24–27 | (Alberta) Kayla Skrlik | (Saskatchewan) Nancy Martin | CA$10,000 | CA$5,000 | Curling Stadium Alberta Curling | 2.5000 |
| 5 | Icebreaker Challenge; Morris, Manitoba, Aug. 25–27 | (Manitoba) Kate Cameron | (United States) Delaney Strouse | CA$6,500 | CA$3,000 | Manitoba Curling | 2.5000 |
| 6 | Oslo Cup; Oslo, Norway, Aug. 31 – Sep. 3 | (Sweden) Anna Hasselborg | (Norway) Marianne Rørvik | kr 88,000 | kr 40,000 | Nordic Curling | 5.0000 |
| 7 | Saville Shootout; Edmonton, Alberta, Sep. 8–11 | (Ontario) Heather Nedohin | (Manitoba) Chelsea Carey | CA$25,000 | CA$6,000 | Curling Stadium Alberta Curling | 7.0000 |
| 7 | Stu Sells Oakville Tankard; Oakville, Ontario, Sep. 8–11 | (South Korea) Ha Seung-youn | (Scotland) Rebecca Morrison | CA$30,000 | CA$8,000 | Stu Sells Ontario Curling | 5.0000 |
| 7 | MCT Challenge; Winnipeg, Manitoba, Sep. 8–10 | (Manitoba) Beth Peterson | (Japan) Honoka Sasaki | CA$10,000 | CA$2,000 | Manitoba Curling | 2.0000 |
| 8 | Women's Masters Basel; Arlesheim, Switzerland, Sep. 15–17 | (Switzerland) Silvana Tirinzoni | (Sweden) Anna Hasselborg | CHF 32,000 | CHF 10,000 | World Curling | 5.0000 |
| 8 | Mother Club Fall Curling Classic; Winnipeg, Manitoba, Sep. 14–17 | (United States) Delaney Strouse | (Manitoba) Jolene Campbell | CA$7,600 | CA$2,500 | Manitoba Curling | 4.0000 |
| 8 | KW Fall Classic; Waterloo, Ontario, Sep. 14–17 | (Ontario) Krista McCarville | (Scotland) Rebecca Morrison | CA$11,000 | CA$3,300 | Ontario Curling | 3.5000 |
| 9 | AMJ Campbell Shorty Jenkins Classic; Cornwall, Ontario, Sep. 20–24 | (Switzerland) Silvana Tirinzoni | (Japan) Yuna Kotani | CA$45,000 | CA$12,000 | Ontario Curling | 5.5000 |
| 9 | Curling Stadium Alberta Curling Series Major; Beaumont, Alberta, Sep. 21–25 | (China) Han Yu | (Manitoba) Kate Cameron | CA$30,000 | CA$8,000 | Curling Stadium Alberta Curling | 4.0000 |
| 9 | US Open of Curling; Blaine, Minnesota, Sep. 21–24 | (United States) Tabitha Peterson | (United States) Sarah Anderson | US$8,000 | US$3,000 | Curling Stadium Ontario Curling | 2.5000 |
| 9 | Great Western Brewing Bonspiel; Saskatoon, Saskatchewan, Sep. 22–24 | (Saskatchewan) Sherry Anderson | (Saskatchewan) Robyn Silvernagle | CA$6,000 | CA$1,500 | Sask Curling | 2.5000 |
| 9 | The Curling Store Cashspiel; Lower Sackville, Nova Scotia, Sep. 22–24 | (Nova Scotia) Jessica Daigle | (Nova Scotia) Christina Black | CA$5,800 | CA$2,700 | World Curling | 1.5000 |
| 9 | Rick Rowsell Classic; St. John's, Newfoundland and Labrador, Sep. 21–24 | (Newfoundland and Labrador) Brooke Godsland | (Newfoundland and Labrador) Stacie Curtis | CA$4,675 | CA$3,100 | — | — |
| 10 | Prestige Hotels & Resorts Curling Classic; Vernon, British Columbia, Sep. 28 – Oct. 1 | (China) Wang Rui | (British Columbia) Corryn Brown | CA$28,500 | CA$6,000 | Curling Stadium British Columbia Curling | 4.0000 |
| 10 | Prague Ladies International; Prague, Czech Republic, Sep. 29 – Oct. 1 | (Czech Republic) Hana Synáčková | (Czech Republic) Anna Kubešková | €5,500 | €2,200 | World Curling | 0.5000 |
| 10 | St. Vital U25 Bonspiel; Winnipeg, Manitoba, Sep. 29 – Oct. 1 | Cancelled | | | | | |
| 11 | Curlers Corner Autumn Gold Curling Classic; Calgary, Alberta, Oct. 6–9 | (South Korea) Gim Eun-ji | (Japan) Miori Nakamura | CA$45,000 | CA$12,250 | Alberta Curling | 6.5000 |
| 11 | Stu Sells Tankard; Barrie, Ontario, Oct. 5–9 | (South Korea) Kim Eun-jung | (Japan) Yuna Kotani | CA$21,000 | CA$7,000 | Stu Sells Ontario Curling | 4.0000 |
| 11 | Regina Highland Rocksgiving; Regina, Saskatchewan, Oct. 6–9 | (Saskatchewan) Cindy Ricci | (Saskatchewan) Jessica Mitchell | CA$8,000 | CA$3,000 | Sask Curling | 1.5000 |
| 11 | New Scotland Brewing Co. Womens Cashspiel; Halifax, Nova Scotia, Oct. 6–8 | (New Brunswick) Melissa Adams | (Nova Scotia) Marie Christianson | CA$3,500 | CA$2,000 | — | 1.0000 |
| 12 | Insitu Players Open; Dundas, Ontario, Oct. 12–15 | (Sweden) Anna Hasselborg | (Sweden) Isabella Wranå | CA$70,000 | CA$20,000 | Players | 7.0000 |
| 12 | Stroud Sleeman Cash Spiel; Stroud, Ontario, Oct. 12–15 | (Ontario) Heather Heggestad | (Ontario) Carly Howard | CA$6,000 | CA$2,000 | Ontario Curling | 2.5000 |
| 12 | S3 Group Curling Stadium Series; Swift Current, Saskatchewan, Oct. 13–15 | (Saskatchewan) Jana Tisdale | (Saskatchewan) Michelle Englot | CA$8,800 | CA$2,600 | Curling Stadium Sask Curling | 2.5000 |
| 12 | Alberta Curling Series: Event 1 Beaumont, Alberta, Oct. 13–15 | (China) Wang Rui | (China) Han Yu | CA$12,000 | CA$3,700 | Curling Stadium Alberta Curling Series | 2.0000 |
| 12 | St. Paul Cashspiel; St. Paul, Minnesota, Oct. 13–15 | (United States) Ariel Traxler | (United States) Allory Johnson | US$8,000 | US$4,000 | Ontario Curling | 2.0000 |
| 12 | MCT Shootout; Selkirk, Manitoba, Oct. 13–15 | (Manitoba) Jolene Campbell | (Manitoba) Kristy Watling | CA$6,000 | CA$4,000 | Manitoba Curling | 1.5000 |
| 12 | Match Town Trophy; Jönköping, Sweden, Oct. 12–15 | (Switzerland) Xenia Schwaller | (Sweden) Tova Sundberg | kr 48,000 | kr 16,000 | Nordic Curling | 1.5000 |
| 13 | Hearing Life Tour Challenge Tier 1 Niagara Falls, Ontario, Oct. 17–22 | (Manitoba) Jennifer Jones | (Manitoba) Kaitlyn Lawes | CA$175,000 | CA$28,000 | Grand Slam | 10.0000 |
| 13 | Hearing Life Tour Challenge Tier 2 Niagara Falls, Ontario, Oct. 17–22 | (South Korea) Kim Eun-jung | (Denmark) Madeleine Dupont | CA$60,000 | CA$10,750 | Grand Slam | 5.5000 |
| 13 | Saville U25 Challenge; Edmonton, Alberta, Oct. 20–22 | (Alberta) Abby Marks | (Alberta) Myla Plett | CA$5,500 | CA$1,800 | Curling Stadium Alberta Curling | 2.0000 |
| 13 | Dave Jones Stanhope Simpson Mayflower Cashspiel; Halifax, Nova Scotia, Oct. 19–22 | (Nova Scotia) Kristen MacDiarmid | (Nova Scotia) Tanya Hilliard | CA$8,600 | CA$2,200 | — | 1.5000 |
| 13 | Atkins Curling Supplies Classic; Winnipeg, Manitoba, Oct. 20–22 | (Manitoba) Lisa McLeod | (Manitoba) Emily Cherwinski | CA$5,300 | CA$2,000 | Manitoba Curling | 1.0000 |
| 13 | King Cash Spiel; Maple Ridge, British Columbia, Oct. 20–22 | (British Columbia) Holly Hafeli | (British Columbia) Kim Dennis | CA$9,600 | CA$3,200 | British Columbia Curling | 1.0000 |
| 14 | North Grenville Women's Fall Curling Classic; Kemptville, Ontario, Oct. 26–29 | (Italy) Stefania Constantini | (Ontario) Hailey Armstrong | CA$25,000 | CA$6,500 | Ontario Curling | 4.5000 |
| 14 | Saville Grand Prix; Edmonton, Alberta, Oct. 27–30 | (Alberta) Selena Sturmay | (United States) Delaney Strouse | CA$15,000 | CA$6,000 | Curling Stadium Alberta Curling | 4.5000 |
| 14 | Sundbyberg Open; Sundbyberg, Sweden, Oct. 27–29 | (Switzerland) Xenia Schwaller | (Norway) Torild Bjørnstad | kr 29,000 | kr 19,000 | Nordic Curling | 1.5000 |
| 14 | Kamloops Crown of Curling; Kamloops, British Columbia, Oct. 27–29 | (British Columbia) Corryn Brown | (British Columbia) Kim Dennis | CA$7,000 | CA$3,000 | British Columbia Curling | 1.0000 |
| 14 | Superstore Lady Monctonian; Moncton, New Brunswick, Oct. 27–29 | (New Brunswick) Abby Burgess | (New Brunswick) Sylvie Quillian | CA$6,000 | CA$2,100 | — | 1.0000 |
| 15 | Stu Sells 1824 Halifax Classic; Halifax, Nova Scotia, Nov. 1–5 | (Switzerland) Silvana Tirinzoni | (Manitoba) Chelsea Carey | CA$25,500 | CA$8,000 | Stu Sells | 5.0000 |
| 15 | Danish Open; Copenhagen, Denmark, Nov. 2–5 | (Switzerland) Xenia Schwaller | (Czech Republic) Anna Kubešková | kr. 32,000 | kr. 16,000 | Nordic Curling | 3.0000 |
| 15 | Moose Jaw SaskTour Spiel; Moose Jaw, Saskatchewan, Nov. 3–5 | (Saskatchewan) Skylar Ackerman | (Saskatchewan) Sherry Anderson | CA$9,600 | CA$1,600 | Sask Curling | 2.5000 |
| 15 | Alberta Curling Series: Event 2 Leduc, Alberta, Nov. 3–5 | (Japan) Yuna Kotani | (Japan) Miyu Ueno | CA$8,750 | CA$3,000 | Curling Stadium Alberta Curling Series | 2.0000 |
| 15 | Tallinn Ladies International Challenger; Tallinn, Estonia, Nov. 2–5 | (Latvia) Evelīna Barone | (Turkey) Dilşat Yıldız | €3,000 | €1,200 | World Curling | 1.0000 |
| 16 | KIOTI National; Westville Road, Nova Scotia, Nov. 7–12 | (South Korea) Gim Eun-ji | (Ontario) Rachel Homan | CA$200,000 | CA$42,000 | Grand Slam | 10.0000 |
| 16 | Ladies Alberta Open; Okotoks, Alberta, Nov. 10–12 | (Alberta) Kayla Skrlik | (Alberta) Abby Marks | CA$9,600 | CA$3,200 | Alberta Curling | 2.0000 |
| 16 | MCT Curling Cup; Winnipeg, Manitoba, Nov. 10–12 | (United States) Kim Rhyme | (Manitoba) Kristy Watling | CA$10,000 | CA$3,000 | Manitoba Curling | 1.5000 |
| 16 | Island Shootout; Victoria, British Columbia, Nov. 10–13 | (British Columbia) Kristen Ryan | (British Columbia) Emily Bowles | CA$5,000 | CA$2,000 | British Columbia Curling | 0.5000 |
| 17 | Pumps and Pressure Red Deer Curling Classic; Red Deer, Alberta, Nov. 17–20 | (Ontario) Rachel Homan | (Alberta) Selena Sturmay | CA$35,000 | CA$10,000 | Alberta Curling | 6.0000 |
| 17 | Curl Mesabi Classic; Eveleth, Minnesota, Nov. 17–19 | (Quebec) Laurie St-Georges | (United States) Miranda Scheel | US$25,000 | US$5,480 | — | 2.0000 |
| 17 | Jim Sullivan Curling Classic; Fredericton, New Brunswick, Nov. 17–19 | (New Brunswick) Melissa Adams | (Nova Scotia) Heather Smith | CA$8,250 | CA$2,000 | — | 1.0000 |
| 18 | Curling Stadium North Bay Women's Spiel; North Bay, Ontario, Nov. 23–26 | (Ontario) Danielle Inglis | (Ontario) Hollie Duncan | CA$10,000 | CA$3,000 | Curling Stadium Ontario Curling | 2.5000 |
| 18 | Nutana SaskTour Women's Spiel; Saskatoon, Saskatchewan, Nov. 24–26 | (Saskatchewan) Skylar Ackerman | (Saskatchewan) Sherilee Orsted | CA$8,000 | CA$2,000 | Sask Curling | 2.5000 |
| 18 | MCT Showdown; East St. Paul, Manitoba, Nov. 24–26 | (Manitoba) Kristy Watling | (Manitoba) Rachel Kaatz | CA$2,500 | CA$1,500 | Manitoba Curling | 0.5000 |
| 18 | PEI Brewing Company; Summerside, Prince Edward Island, Nov. 24–26 | (Prince Edward Island) Amanda Power | (Prince Edward Island) Jane DiCarlo | CA$3,200 | CA$1,300 | — | 0.5000 |
| 19 | Karuizawa International; Karuizawa, Japan, Dec. 1–3 | (Japan) Ikue Kitazawa | (South Korea) Kim Eun-jung | ¥1,500,000 | ¥800,000 | — | 4.5000 |
| 19 | DeKalb Superspiel; Morris, Manitoba, Dec. 1–4 | (Switzerland) Xenia Schwaller | (Alberta) Serena Gray-Withers | CA$30,000 | CA$10,000 | Manitoba Curling | 4.5000 |
| 19 | Stu Sells Brantford Nissan Classic; Brantford, Ontario, Dec. 1–4 | (Ontario) Courtney Auld | (Northwest Territories) Kerry Galusha | CA$15,000 | CA$5,000 | Stu Sells Ontario Curling | 3.5000 |
| 19 | Alberta Curling Series: Event 3 Beaumont, Alberta, Dec. 1–3 | (Alberta) Kayla Skrlik | (Alberta) Michelle Hartwell | CA$8,125 | CA$2,700 | Curling Stadium Alberta Curling Series | 2.0000 |
| 20 | Nutrien Ag Solutions Western Showdown; Swift Current, Saskatchewan, Dec. 6–10 | (South Korea) Kim Eun-jung | (Manitoba) Jolene Campbell | CA$50,000 | CA$16,000 | Curling Stadium | 7.0000 |
| 20 | Bogside Cup; Montague, Prince Edward Island, Dec. 8–10 | (Quebec) Laurie St-Georges | (Nova Scotia) Tanya Hilliard | CA$7,000 | CA$3,000 | — | 1.5000 |
| 20 | Aberdeen Classic; Aberdeen, Scotland, Dec. 8–10 | (Scotland) Fay Henderson | (Czech Republic) Hana Synáčková | £4,500 | £2,000 | — | 1.0000 |
| 21 | WFG Masters; Saskatoon, Saskatchewan, Dec. 12–17 | (Ontario) Rachel Homan | (Switzerland) Silvana Tirinzoni | CA$200,000 | CA$38,000 | Grand Slam | 10.0000 |
| 23 | New Year Curling in Miyota; Miyota, Japan, Dec. 29–Jan. 1 | (Japan) Miori Nakamura | (Japan) Yuna Kotani | ¥2,000,000 | ¥1,000,000 | World Curling Japan | 2.5000 |
| 24 | Mercure Perth Masters; Perth, Scotland, Jan. 4–7 | (British Columbia) Clancy Grandy | (Scotland) Jackie Lockhart | £10,000 | £4,500 | — | 2.5000 |
| 24 | SaskTour Womens Players Championship; Yorkton, Saskatchewan, Jan. 5–7 | (Saskatchewan) Skylar Ackerman | (Saskatchewan) Jessica Mitchell | CA$4,300 | CA$1,700 | Sask Curling | 2.0000 |
| 25 | Cortina Curling Cup; Cortina d'Ampezzo, Italy, Jan. 11–13 | (Turkey) Dilşat Yıldız | (Switzerland) Xenia Schwaller | €20,000 | €5,000 | World Curling | 4.0000 |
| 25 | MCT Championships; Winnipeg, Manitoba, Jan. 12–14 | (Manitoba) Beth Peterson | (Alberta) Selena Sturmay | CA$5,500 | CA$2,000 | Manitoba Curling | 1.5000 |
| 26 | Co-op Canadian Open; Red Deer, Alberta, Jan. 16–21 | (Ontario) Rachel Homan | (Switzerland) Silvana Tirinzoni | CA$200,000 | CA$35,000 | Grand Slam | 10.0000 |
| 26 | St. Galler Elite Challenge; St. Gallen, Switzerland, Jan. 18–21 | (Germany) Mia Höhne | (Switzerland) Isabel Einspieler | CHF 4,600 | CHF 1,300 | World Curling | 1.0000 |
| 27 | International Bernese Ladies Cup; Bern, Switzerland, Jan. 25–28 | (South Korea) Gim Eun-ji | (South Korea) Kim Eun-jung | CHF 20,000 | CHF 6,000 | World Curling | 5.0000 |
| 30 | Sun City Cup; Karlstad, Sweden, Feb. 15–18 | (Sweden) Isabella Wranå | (Japan) Satsuki Fujisawa | kr 55,000 | kr 25,000 | Nordic Curling Tour | 4.0000 |
| 38 | Princess Auto Players' Championship; Toronto, Ontario, Apr. 9–14 | (Switzerland) Silvana Tirinzoni | (Sweden) Isabella Wranå | CA$175,000 | CA$60,000 | Grand Slam | 10.0000 |

=== Mixed doubles events ===
| Week | Event | Winning pair | Runner-up pair | Purse | Winner's share | Tour | SFM |
|---|---|---|---|---|---|---|---|
| 1 | Summer Doubles Cup; Baden, Switzerland, July 2–3 | Cancelled | | | | | |
| 4 | Summer Series; Saint-Félicien, Quebec, Aug. 17–20 | (British Columbia) MacMillan / Middleton | (Quebec) Riley / Mullen | CA$18,000 | CA$5,000 | Circuit Goldline | 4.5000 |
| 5 | St. Vital Mixed Doubles NISO Classic; Winnipeg, Manitoba, Aug. 24–27 | (British Columbia) Armstrong / Griffith | (Manitoba) D. McEwen / M. McEwen | CA$15,000 | CA$4,000 | Manitoba Mixed Doubles Curling | 2.5000 |
| 7 | Goldline Boucherville Mixed Doubles; Boucherville, Quebec, Sep. 8–10 | (Quebec) St-Georges / Asselin | (Ontario) Zheng / Pietrangelo | CA$7,500 | CA$2,000 | Circuit Goldline | 4.5000 |
| 7 | Mixed Doubles Prague Open; Prague, Czech Republic, Sep. 7–10 | (Switzerland) Engler / Wunderlin | (Germany) Abbes / Harsch | €3,500 | €1,100 | World Curling | 1.5000 |
| 9 | WCT Tallinn Mixed Doubles International; Tallinn, Estonia, Sep. 21–24 | (Norway) Skaslien / Nedregotten | (Norway) Rønning / Brænden | €4,000 | €1,400 | World Curling | 5.0000 |
| 9 | Mixed Doubles Midweek Kick-Off; Saskatoon, Saskatchewan, Sep. 17–21 | (Saskatchewan) Martin / Laycock | (Saskatchewan) Just / Gareau | CA$4,000 | CA$2,000 | Sask Curling | 1.5000 |
| 9 | Victoria Mixed Doubles Cash Spiel; Victoria, British Columbia, Sep. 22–24 | (British Columbia) Reese-Hansen / Chester | (British Columbia) Mallett / Meister | CA$8,000 | CA$2,100 | British Columbia Curling | 1.0000 |
| 9 | Morris CCTC Mixed Doubles Classic; Morris, Manitoba, Sep. 22–24 | Cancelled | | | | | |
| 10 | Colorado Curling Cup; Lafayette, Colorado, Sep. 28 – Oct. 1 | (United States) Anderson / Stopera | (United States) Moores / Wheeler | US$12,000 | US$3,000 | World Curling | 2.0000 |
| 10 | John Ross & Sons Mixed Doubles Spiel; Halifax, Nova Scotia, Sep. 29 – Oct. 1 | (Nova Scotia) Myketyn-Driscoll / McEachren | (Nova Scotia) Smith / Purcell | CA$4,800 | CA$1,200 | — | 1.0000 |
| 11 | Sherwood Park Shootout; Sherwood Park, Alberta, Oct. 5–8 | (Japan) Matsumura / Tanida | (Alberta) Walker / (Saskatchewan) Muyres | CA$18,000 | CA$6,000 | Super Series | 6.0000 |
| 11 | Mixed Doubles Trophy Baden; Baden, Switzerland, Oct. 7–8 | Cancelled | | | | | |
| 12 | Chilliwack Championship; Chilliwack, British Columbia, Oct. 12–15 | (Estonia) Kaldvee / Lill | (British Columbia) Ja. Cotter / Ji. Cotter | CA$18,000 | CA$6,000 | Super Series | 5.0000 |
| 12 | Goldline Valleyfield Mixed Doubles; Salaberry-de-Valleyfield, Quebec, Oct. 13–15 | (Quebec) Gionest / Desjardins | (Quebec) Gagné / Morissette | CA$4,000 | CA$800 | Circuit Goldline | 2.0000 |
| 12 | WCT Austrian Mixed Doubles Cup; Kitzbühel, Austria, Oct. 12–15 | (Czech Republic) Zelingrová / Chabičovský | (France) Shevchuk / Coulot | €3,200 | €1,200 | World Curling | 1.0000 |
| 12 | Norway Open Mixed Doubles; Stange, Norway, Oct. 13–15 | (Norway) Kjærland / Kongssund | (Norway) Pettersen / Andreassen | kr 10,000 | kr 5,000 | — | 0.5000 |
| 13 | Curling Stadium Martensville Mixed Doubles; Martensville, Saskatchewan, Oct. 20–23 | (Japan) Koana / Aoki | (Saskatchewan) Thevenot / Kalthoff | CA$12,000 | CA$3,000 | Curling Stadium Sask Curling | 2.5000 |
| 13 | Arthur Mixed Doubles Spiel; Arthur, Ontario, Oct. 20–22 | (Ontario) Sandham / Craig | (Ontario) C. Spruit / G. Spruit | CA$6,500 | CA$2,000 | Ontario Mixed Doubles Curling | 1.5000 |
| 13 | Delta Hotels by Marriott Fredericton Doubles Cashspiel; Fredericton, New Brunswick, Oct. 20–22 | (Quebec) Laplante / Gibeau | (New Brunswick) Thompson / Sullivan | CA$6,300 | CA$1,600 | — | 1.5000 |
| 14 | Moose Jaw Open; Moose Jaw, Saskatchewan, Oct. 26–29 | (Japan) Koana / Aoki | (Japan) Matsumura / Tanida | CA$18,000 | CA$6,000 | Super Series | 4.5000 |
| 14 | WCT Mixed Doubles Cup Geising; Geising, Germany, Oct. 26–29 | (Lithuania) Janulevičiūtė / Kiudys | (Czech Republic) Paulová / Paul | €2,000 | €800 | World Curling | 1.0000 |
| 15 | Mixed Doubles Gstaad; Gstaad, Switzerland, Nov. 3–5 | (Switzerland) Perret / Rios | (Sweden) Westman / Ahlberg | CHF 7,000 | CHF 2,800 | — | 4.0000 |
| 15 | Palmerston Mixed Doubles Spiel; Palmerston, Ontario, Nov. 3–5 | (Japan) Koana / Aoki | (Ontario) K. Cottrill / S. Cottrill | CA$5,800 | CA$1,500 | Ontario Mixed Doubles Curling | 2.0000 |
| 15 | Mixed Doubles Slovakia Cup 1 Bratislava, Slovakia, Nov. 2–5 | (Slovakia) Orokocká / Gallo | (Slovakia) Sykorova / Sykora | €2,000 | €1,000 | World Curling | 0.5000 |
| 16 | ISS Mixed Doubles Łódź; Łódź, Poland, Nov. 9–12 | (Norway) Skaslien / Nedregotten | (Estonia) Kaare / Lill | €3,500 | €860 | World Curling | 3.0000 |
| 16 | Omnium Serviciers Financiers Richard April; Rivière-du-Loup, Quebec, Nov. 10–12 | (China) Han / Zou | (China) Yang / Tian | CA$4,000 | CA$800 | Circuit Goldline | 3.0000 |
| 16 | Curling Stadium SaskTour Mixed Doubles Series; Martensville, Saskatchewan, Nov. 10–12 | (Saskatchewan) M. Kleiter / R. Kleiter | (Saskatchewan) Thevenot / Kalthoff | CA$5,500 | CA$1,500 | Curling Stadium Sask Curling | 2.5000 |
| 17 | Hardline Sherbrooke Mixed Doubles; Sherbrooke, Quebec, Nov. 17–19 | (China) Yang / Tian | (China) Han / Zou | CA$6,500 | CA$2,000 | — | 2.0000 |
| 17 | Parksville Double Doubles; Parksville, British Columbia, Nov. 17–19 | (British Columbia) Backe / (New Zealand) Sargon | (British Columbia) Durrant / Chester | CA$5,000 | CA$1,200 | British Columbia Curling | 0.5000 |
| 18 | Alberta Curling Series Mixed Doubles: Event 1 Beaumont, Alberta, Nov. 24–26 | (Alberta) Walker / (Saskatchewan) Muyres | (British Columbia) Reese-Hansen / Chester | CA$6,250 | CA$1,850 | Alberta Curling Series | 2.5000 |
| 18 | Ilderton Mixed Doubles Spiel; Ilderton, Ontario, Nov. 24–26 | (Ontario) Sandham / Craig | (China) Dong / Ma | CA$7,600 | CA$2,500 | Ontario Mixed Doubles Curling | 2.5000 |
| 18 | WCT Latvian Mixed Doubles Curling Cup 1 Riga, Latvia, Nov. 23–26 | (Sweden) Nilsson / Olofsson | (Estonia) Vahi / Padama | €1,000 | €400 | World Curling | 0.5000 |
| 19 | British Curling Mixed Doubles Super Series; Stirling, Scotland, Nov. 30–Dec. 3 | (Norway) Rønning / Brænden | (Scotland) Henderson / Kyle | £8,000 | £4,000 | — | 4.0000 |
| 19 | Winnipeg Open – Mixed Doubles Super Series; Winnipeg, Manitoba, Nov. 30–Dec. 3 | (Manitoba) Lott / Stewart | (Alberta) Walker / (Saskatchewan) Muyres | CA$20,000 | CA$6,000 | Super Series | 3.5000 |
| 19 | Kerrobert Sask Tour Mixed Doubles; Kerrobert, Saskatchewan, Dec. 1–3 | (Saskatchewan) Kuzyk / Wills | (Saskatchewan) Barber / Heidt | CA$5,300 | CA$2,000 | Curling Stadium Sask Curling | 0.5000 |
| 20 | Penticton Mixed Doubles; Penticton, British Columbia, Dec. 8–10 | (British Columbia) Kyllo / Griffith | (Alberta) Tran / Sluchinski | CA$12,000 | CA$3,000 | British Columbia Curling | 1.0000 |
| 20 | Mixed Doubles Trophy Aargau; Aarau, Switzerland, Dec. 10–11 | Cancelled | | | | | |
| 21 | St. Thomas Mixed Doubles Classic; St. Thomas, Ontario, Dec. 15–17 | (Ontario) Weagle / Epping | (Ontario) O. Forster / K. Forster | CA$7,000 | CA$1,800 | Ontario Mixed Doubles | 2.0000 |
| 21 | Goldline Victoria Mixed Doubles; Quebec City, Quebec, Dec. 14–17 | (Quebec) Gionest / Desjardins | (Quebec) Gagné / Morissette | CA$5,000 | CA$1,200 | Circuit Goldline | 2.0000 |
| 21 | Alberta Curling Series Mixed Doubles: Event #2; Beaumont, Alberta, Dec. 15–17 | (Alberta) Papley / van Amsterdam | (Alberta) Nedohin / Morris | CA$3,450 | CA$1,350 | Alberta Curling Series | 1.0000 |
| 21 | Cincinnati Mixed Doubles Cup; Cincinnati, Ohio, Dec. 15–17 | (United States) Schweitzer / Hagberg | (United States) Ostrowski / Johnson | US$5,000 | US$2,405 | World Curling | 0.5000 |
| 23 | Oakville Open; Oakville, Ontario, Dec. 28–31 | (Japan) Koana / Aoki | (Japan) Matsumura / Tanida | CA$18,000 | CA$6,000 | Super Series | 7.0000 |
| 23 | Gothenburg Mixed Doubles Cup; Gothenburg, Sweden, Dec. 28–30 | (Sweden) Hasselborg / Eriksson | (Sweden) I. Wranå / R. Wranå | kr 75,000 | kr 35,000 | World Curling | 2.5000 |
| 23 | Southern Mixed Doubles; Charlotte, North Carolina, Dec. 28–31 | (United States) Anderson / Richardson | (Saskatchewan) Martin / Stewart | US$10,500 | US$2,800 | World Curling | 1.0000 |
| 24 | Mixed Doubles Super Series – Halifax; Halifax, Nova Scotia, Jan. 4–7 | (Norway) Rønning / Brænden | (Nova Scotia) Myketyn-Driscoll / McEachren | CA$18,000 | CA$6,000 | Super Series | 6.0000 |
| 24 | Rocky Mountain Mixed Doubles Classic; Banff & Canmore, Alberta, Jan. 4–7 | (United States) Thiesse / Dropkin | (Alberta) Papley / van Amsterdam | CA$30,000 | CA$8,000 | Alberta Curling Series | 4.0000 |
| 24 | MadTown DoubleDown; McFarland, Wisconsin, Jan. 4–7 | (United States) Anderson / Stopera | (United States) B. Hamilton / M. Hamilton | US$26,000 | US$7,000 | World Curling | 3.0000 |
| 25 | Ontario Mixed Doubles Tour Championship; Cambridge, Ontario, Jan. 12–14 | (Ontario) Weeks / Steep | (Ontario) Wasylkiw / Konings | CA$6,300 | CA$1,200 | Ontario Mixed Doubles | 2.0000 |
| 25 | Goldline Mixed Doubles Mont-Bruno; Saint-Bruno-de-Montarville, Quebec, Jan. 12–14 | (Ontario) Hopson / Tippett | (Quebec) Fellmann / Kovalchuk | CA$4,000 | CA$1,200 | Circuit Goldline | 1.5000 |
| 26 | Jamaican Cup - Caribbean Cup Mixed Doubles Series; Dundas, Ontario, Jan. 20–21 | (Ontario) Feldkamp / Villard | (Ontario) M. Butler / J. Butler | CA$5,500 | CA$1,000 | Caribbean Cup Mixed Doubles Series | 1.0000 |
| 27 | Gefle Mixed Doubles Cup; Gävle, Sweden Jan. 25–28 | (Sweden) Andersson / Granbom | (Poland) Walczak / Augustyniak | €3,100 | €1,400 | World Curling | 1.5000 |
| 28 | Dutch Masters Mixed Doubles; Zoetermeer, Netherlands, Feb. 1–4 | Cancelled | | | | | |
| 28 | Curling Stadium North Bay Doubles Major; North Bay, Ontario, Feb. 2–4 | (Ontario) Brunton / Horgan | (Estonia) Kaldvee / Lill | CA$4,000 | CA$1,200 | Curling Stadium | 1.5000 |
| 29 | Mixed Doubles Players' Championship; Brantford, Ontario Feb. 8–11 | (Estonia) Kaldvee / Lill | (Norway) Skaslien / Nedregotten | CA$18,000 | CA$6,000 | Super Series | 6.5000 |
| 30 | WCT Tallinn Masters Mixed Doubles; Tallinn, Estonia, Feb. 15–18 | (Germany) Abbes / Harsch | (Poland) Walczak / Augustyniak | €3,225 | €1,200 | World Curling | 1.5000 |
| 30 | Goldline Mixed Doubles Royal Montreal; Montreal, Quebec, Feb. 16–18 | (Ontario) Deschenes / Epping | (Quebec) Gagné / Morissette | CA$4,000 | CA$1,500 | Circuit Goldline | 2.5000 |
| 32 | Goldline Tour Finals; Chicoutimi, Quebec, Mar. 1–3 | (Quebec) Gagné / Morissette | (New Brunswick) Adams / Robichaud | CA$6,000 | CA$1,500 | Circuit Goldline | 2.0000 |
| 32 | Hvidovre Mixed Doubles Cup; Hvidovre, Denmark, Mar. 1–3 | (Italy) Romei / Gonin | (Poland) Walczak / Augustyniak | €3,700 | €1,000 | World Curling | 1.5000 |
| 34 | WCT Slovakia Mixed Doubles Cup II; Bratislava, Slovakia, Mar. 14–17 | (China) Han / Zou | (Czech Republic) Paulová / Paul | €2,300 | €1,000 | World Curling | 1.0000 |
| 37 | Mixed Doubles Prague Trophy; Prague, Czech Republic, Apr. 5–7 | (China) Han / Zou | (Germany) Abbes / Harsch | €3,350 | €1,450 | World Curling | 3.5000 |
| 37 | WCT Latvian Mixed Doubles Curling Cup 2 Riga, Latvia, Apr. 4–7 | (Japan) Koana / Aoki | (Latvia) Avena / Avotiņš | €1,000 | €340 | World Curling | 1.5000 |

== WCF rankings ==
Men

Final Standings
| # | Skip | YTD | OOM |
|---|---|---|---|
| 1 | (Italy) Joël Retornaz | 440.5 | 440.5 |
| 2 | (Scotland) Bruce Mouat | 394.0 | 394.0 |
| 3 | (Newfoundland and Labrador) Brad Gushue | 381.8 | 381.8 |
| 4 | (Alberta) Brendan Bottcher | 366.8 | 366.8 |
| 5 | (Scotland) Ross Whyte | 323.3 | 323.3 |
| 6 | (Sweden) Niklas Edin | 321.8 | 321.8 |
| 7 | (Switzerland) Yannick Schwaller | 305.8 | 305.8 |
| 8 | (Saskatchewan) Mike McEwen | 236.9 | 236.9 |
| 9 | (Manitoba) Matt Dunstone | 224.3 | 224.3 |
| 10 | (Alberta) Kevin Koe | 209.5 | 209.5 |
| 11 | (Manitoba) Reid Carruthers | 208.0 | 208.0 |
| 12 | (Scotland) James Craik | 199.8 | 199.8 |
| 13 | (United States) John Shuster | 196.3 | 196.3 |
| 14 | (Switzerland) Michael Brunner | 193.9 | 193.9 |
| 15 | (Scotland) Cameron Bryce | 178.6 | 178.6 |

Women

Final Standings
| # | Skip | YTD | OOM |
|---|---|---|---|
| 1 | (Ontario) Rachel Homan | 498.8 | 498.8 |
| 2 | (Switzerland) Silvana Tirinzoni | 434.3 | 434.3 |
| 3 | (South Korea) Gim Eun-ji | 362.0 | 362.0 |
| 4 | (Manitoba) Jennifer Jones | 316.1 | 316.1 |
| 5 | (Sweden) Anna Hasselborg | 298.0 | 298.0 |
| 6 | (Sweden) Isabella Wranå | 271.8 | 271.8 |
| 7 | (South Korea) Kim Eun-jung | 265.8 | 265.8 |
| 8 | (Manitoba) Kerri Einarson | 251.3 | 251.3 |
| 9 | (Italy) Stefania Constantini | 250.8 | 250.8 |
| 10 | (Manitoba) Kaitlyn Lawes | 207.4 | 207.4 |
| 11 | (Switzerland) Xenia Schwaller | 203.9 | 203.9 |
| 12 | (Japan) Satsuki Fujisawa | 190.8 | 190.8 |
| 13 | (United States) Tabitha Peterson | 186.9 | 186.9 |
| 14 | (Alberta) Selena Sturmay | 180.1 | 180.1 |
| 15 | (Scotland) Rebecca Morrison | 172.4 | 172.4 |

Mixed Doubles

Final Standings
| # | Team | YTD | OOM |
|---|---|---|---|
| 1 | (Estonia) Kaldvee / Lill | 206.0 | 206.0 |
| 2 | (Norway) Skaslien / Nedregotten | 188.8 | 188.8 |
| 3 | (Alberta) Walker / (Saskatchewan) Muyres | 167.1 | 167.1 |
| 4 | (Japan) Koana / Aoki | 140.3 | 140.3 |
| 5 | (Japan) Matsumura / Tanida | 138.3 | 138.3 |
| 6 | (Alberta) Papley / van Amsterdam | 134.5 | 134.5 |
| 7 | (Norway) Rønning / Brænden | 126.9 | 126.9 |
| 8 | (Manitoba) K. Lott / C. Lott | 124.9 | 124.9 |
| 9 | (Saskatchewan) M. Kleiter / R. Kleiter | 120.5 | 120.5 |
| 10 | (Sweden) I. Wranå / R. Wranå | 111.3 | 111.3 |
| 11 | (Saskatchewan) Martin / Laycock | 99.4 | 99.4 |
| 12 | (Ontario) Weagle / Epping | 97.3 | 97.3 |
| 13 | (Quebec) St-Georges / Asselin | 97.1 | 97.1 |
| 14 | (Switzerland) Schwaller-Hürlimann / Schwaller | 95.1 | 95.1 |
| 15 | (British Columbia) Ja. Cotter / Ji. Cotter | 94.4 | 94.4 |

== Notes ==
| Preceded by 2022–23 | 2023–24 curling season June 2023 – May 2024 | Succeeded by 2024–25 |
