= 2023 PEI Tankard =

2023 PEI Tankard Men's Championship
- Host city: Crapaud, Prince Edward Island
- Arena: Crapaud Community Curling Club
- Dates: January 25–29
- Winner: Team Smith
- Curling club: Crapaud Community CC, Crapaud
- Skip: Tyler Smith
- Third: Adam Cocks
- Second: Alex MacFadyen
- Lead: Edward White
- Finalist: Darren Higgins

The 2023 PEI Tankard, the provincial men's curling championship for Prince Edward Island, was held from January 25 to 29 at the Crapaud Community Curling Club in Crapaud, Prince Edward Island. The event was held in conjunction with the 2023 Prince Edward Island Scotties Tournament of Hearts, the provincial women's championship.

The winning Tyler Smith rink represented Prince Edward Island at the 2023 Tim Hortons Brier in London, Ontario where they finished eighth in Pool B with a 2–6 record.

This is the first time since 2021 that the event will be held due to the COVID-19 pandemic in Canada.

== Teams ==
The teams are listed as follows:

Skip	Third	Second	Lead	Alternate	Club
Adam Casey	Craig Savill	Steve Burgess	Robbie Doherty		Cornwall CC, Cornwall
Bryan Cochrane	Ian MacAulay	Eddie MacKenzie	Jeremy MacAulay		Cornwall CC, Cornwall
Philip Gorveatt	Kevin Champion	Sean Ledgerwood	Mike Dillon		Montague CC, Montague
Tyler Harris	Tyler MacKenzie	Daniel MacFadyen	Nathan Hardy		Crapaud Community CC, Crapaud
Tim Hockin (Fourth)	Darren Higgins (Skip)	Mike Spencer	Jonathan Greenan		Silver Fox CC, Summerside
Blair Jay	Chuck Jay	Corey Montgomery	Glenn Rogers		Silver Fox CC, Summerside
Jamie Newson	Dennis Watts	Corey Miller	Andrew MacDougall	Terry Arsenault	Silver Fox CC, Summerside
Chase MacMillan (Fourth)	Mitchell Schut (Skip)	Cruz Pineau	Liam Kelly	Colin MacKenzie	Cornwall CC, Cornwall
Calvin Smith	Alan Inman	Adam Arsenault	Tyson Smith		Crapaud Community CC, Crapaud
Tyler Smith	Adam Cocks	Alex MacFadyen	Edward White		Crapaud Community CC, Crapaud
Steve vanOuwerkerk	Sam Ramsay	Nick vanOuwerkerk	Patrick Ramsay		Silver Fox CC, Summerside

== Knockout brackets ==
=== A event ===
First Knockout	Qualifier 1
Mitchell Schut	7
Blair Jay	5
Mitchell Schut	3
Adam Casey	8
Adam Casey	10
Jamie Newson	6	Bryan Cochrane	5
Bryan Cochrane	7	Adam Casey	8
Tyler Smith	9
Tyler Smith	11
Steve vanOuwerkerk	7	Steve vanOuwerkerk	5
Calvin Smith	6	Tyler Smith	7
Darren Higgins	5
Darren Higgins	9
Tyler Harris	4	Philip Gorveatt	7
Philip Gorveatt	8

=== B event ===
Second Knockout	B Qualifier
Adam Casey	4
Calvin Smith	11
Darren Higgins	8	Darren Higgins	7
Blair Jay	6
Calvin Smith	3	Bryan Cochrane	3
Bryan Cochrane	7	Darren Higgins	8
Tyler Harris	2
Tyler Smith	5
Bryan Cochrane	10
Tyler Smith	10
Mitchell Schut	1	Philip Gorveatt	9
Philip Gorveatt	7	Philip Gorveatt	9
Jamie Newson	5
Jamie Newson	9
Steve vanOuwerkerk	4

=== C event ===
Third Knockout	C Qualifier
Tyler Smith	9
Adam Casey	10	Adam Casey	4
Mitchell Schut	5	Steve vanOuwerkerk	3	Tyler Smith	7
Steve vanOuwerkerk	7	Steve vanOuwerkerk	10	Darren Higgins	1
Calvin Smith	5	Darren Higgins	9
Philip Gorveatt	4	Bryan Cochrane	2
Bryan Cochrane	13	Bryan Cochrane	9
Jamie Newson	6	Tyler Harris	4
Blair Jay	6	Tyler Harris	9
Tyler Harris	9

== Knockout results ==
All draw times are listed in Atlantic Time (UTC−04:00).

=== Draw 1 ===
Wednesday, January 25, 9:00 am

Sheet A	1	2	3	4	5	6	7	8	9	10	Final
Jamie Newson	0	0	0	3	0	0	1	0	2	0	6
Bryan Cochrane 🔨	1	1	1	0	0	1	0	1	0	2	7

Sheet B	1	2	3	4	5	6	7	8	9	10	Final
Steve vanOuwerkerk 🔨	5	1	0	0	0	0	0	0	0	1	7
Calvin Smith	0	0	0	0	3	0	1	1	1	0	6

Sheet C	1	2	3	4	5	6	7	8	9	10	Final
Tyler Harris 🔨	0	0	1	0	0	2	0	1	X	X	4
Philip Gorveatt	0	1	0	4	1	0	2	0	X	X	8

Sheet D	1	2	3	4	5	6	7	8	9	10	Final
Mitchell Schut	0	0	2	0	1	1	0	2	0	1	7
Blair Jay 🔨	1	0	0	2	0	0	1	0	1	0	5

=== Draw 2 ===
Wednesday, January 25, 2:00 pm

Sheet B	1	2	3	4	5	6	7	8	9	10	Final
Darren Higgins	0	0	2	0	2	0	0	2	1	2	9
Philip Gorveatt 🔨	2	2	0	2	0	1	0	0	0	0	7

Sheet C	1	2	3	4	5	6	7	8	9	10	Final
Tyler Smith 🔨	2	0	0	2	1	0	2	1	3	X	11
Steve vanOuwerkerk	0	2	2	0	0	1	0	0	0	X	5

Sheet D	1	2	3	4	5	6	7	8	9	10	Final
Adam Casey	2	0	2	0	3	2	1	X	X	X	10
Bryan Cochrane 🔨	0	3	0	2	0	0	0	X	X	X	5

=== Draw 3 ===
Wednesday, January 25, 7:00 pm

Sheet A	1	2	3	4	5	6	7	8	9	10	Final
Tyler Harris 🔨	1	0	0	0	1	0	0	0	X	X	2
Bryan Cochrane	0	0	3	2	0	1	1	3	X	X	10

Sheet C	1	2	3	4	5	6	7	8	9	10	Final
Calvin Smith 🔨	2	0	2	4	0	0	2	0	1	X	11
Blair Jay	0	1	0	0	1	2	0	2	0	X	6

Sheet D	1	2	3	4	5	6	7	8	9	10	Final
Jamie Newson 🔨	0	0	0	3	3	1	2	X	X	X	9
Steve vanOuwerkerk	1	2	1	0	0	0	0	X	X	X	4

=== Draw 4 ===
Thursday, January 26, 9:00 am

Sheet C	1	2	3	4	5	6	7	8	9	10	Final
Mitchell Schut	0	0	1	0	1	0	0	1	0	X	3
Adam Casey 🔨	1	1	0	2	0	1	1	0	2	X	8

Sheet D	1	2	3	4	5	6	7	8	9	10	Final
Tyler Smith	0	0	1	0	1	2	0	1	2	X	7
Darren Higgins 🔨	1	0	0	3	0	0	1	0	0	X	5

=== Draw 5 ===
Thursday, January 26, 2:00 pm

Sheet B	1	2	3	4	5	6	7	8	9	10	Final
Blair Jay 🔨	0	0	2	0	2	0	2	0	0	X	6
Tyler Harris	1	3	0	1	0	1	0	1	2	X	9

Sheet C	1	2	3	4	5	6	7	8	9	10	Final
Philip Gorveatt 🔨	1	1	1	0	0	2	0	0	0	2	7
Jamie Newson	0	0	0	0	1	0	2	1	1	0	5

Sheet D	1	2	3	4	5	6	7	8	9	10	Final
Calvin Smith 🔨	0	2	0	0	0	0	0	1	0	X	3
Bryan Cochrane	1	0	0	2	1	1	1	0	1	X	7

=== Draw 6 ===
Thursday, January 26, 7:00 pm

Sheet A	1	2	3	4	5	6	7	8	9	10	Final
Darren Higgins 🔨	0	0	1	2	0	2	1	2	X	X	8
Bryan Cochrane	0	1	0	0	2	0	0	0	X	X	3

Sheet B	1	2	3	4	5	6	7	8	9	10	Final
Adam Casey 🔨	2	0	1	0	1	0	2	0	2	0	8
Tyler Smith	0	1	0	2	0	3	0	1	0	2	9

Sheet D	1	2	3	4	5	6	7	8	9	10	Final
Mitchell Schut	0	0	0	0	1	0	X	X	X	X	1
Philip Gorveatt 🔨	1	1	3	1	0	3	X	X	X	X	9

=== Draw 7 ===
Friday, January 27, 9:00 am

Sheet A	1	2	3	4	5	6	7	8	9	10	Final
Jamie Newson	1	0	1	0	2	0	2	0	0	X	6
Tyler Harris 🔨	0	3	0	2	0	2	0	1	1	X	9

Sheet B	1	2	3	4	5	6	7	8	9	10	Final
Steve vanOuwerkerk	0	1	1	0	1	0	2	0	1	1	7
Calvin Smith 🔨	2	0	0	1	0	1	0	1	0	0	5

=== Draw 8 ===
Friday, January 27, 2:00 pm

Sheet A	1	2	3	4	5	6	7	8	9	10	11	Final
Tyler Smith	0	2	0	0	0	3	1	0	3	0	1	10
Philip Gorveatt 🔨	1	0	2	1	2	0	0	2	0	1	0	9

Sheet B	1	2	3	4	5	6	7	8	9	10	Final
Adam Casey 🔨	0	1	0	0	2	0	0	1	0	0	4
Darren Higgins	1	0	1	1	0	1	1	0	1	1	7

Sheet C	1	2	3	4	5	6	7	8	9	10	Final
Mitchell Schut	0	0	2	0	1	0	2	0	0	X	5
Steve vanOuwerkerk 🔨	2	0	0	3	0	2	0	2	1	X	10

Sheet D	1	2	3	4	5	6	7	8	9	10	Final
Bryan Cochrane 🔨	1	0	0	2	0	5	3	2	X	X	13
Tyler Harris	0	2	1	0	1	0	0	0	X	X	4

=== Draw 9 ===
Friday, January 27, 7:00 pm

Sheet C	1	2	3	4	5	6	7	8	9	10	Final
Darren Higgins	0	1	0	1	0	1	0	3	1	1	8
Tyler Smith 🔨	1	0	1	0	2	0	1	0	0	0	5

=== Draw 10 ===
Saturday, January 28, 9:00 am

Sheet C	1	2	3	4	5	6	7	8	9	10	Final
Philip Gorveatt 🔨	1	0	2	0	1	0	0	X	X	X	4
Bryan Cochrane	0	2	0	1	0	4	2	X	X	X	9

Sheet D	1	2	3	4	5	6	7	8	9	10	Final
Adam Casey	2	0	3	0	1	0	4	X	X	X	10
Steve vanOuwerkerk	0	1	0	1	0	1	0	X	X	X	3

=== Draw 11 ===
Saturday, January 28, 2:00 pm

Sheet A	1	2	3	4	5	6	7	8	9	10	Final
Darren Higgins 🔨	0	4	0	3	2	X	X	X	X	X	9
Bryan Cochrane	0	0	2	0	0	X	X	X	X	X	2

Sheet B	1	2	3	4	5	6	7	8	9	10	Final
Tyler Smith 🔨	2	0	3	0	4	0	X	X	X	X	9
Adam Casey	0	2	0	1	0	1	X	X	X	X	4

=== Draw 12 ===
Saturday, January 28, 7:00 pm

Sheet C	1	2	3	4	5	6	7	8	9	10	Final
Tyler Smith	0	1	2	0	2	2	X	X	X	X	7
Darren Higgins	0	0	0	1	0	0	X	X	X	X	1

== Playoffs ==
Semifinal			Final
			A	Tyler Smith
B	Darren Higgins	5	C	Tyler Smith
C	Tyler Smith	9

=== Semifinal ===
Sunday, January 12, 9:00 am

Sheet B	1	2	3	4	5	6	7	8	9	10	Final
Darren Higgins	0	0	2	0	0	1	0	2	0	X	5
Tyler Smith 🔨	1	2	0	2	1	0	3	0	1	X	9

=== Final ===
- Not needed as Team Smith would've needed to be beaten twice

2023 PEI Tankard
(Prince Edward Island)
Tyler Smith
1st PEI Provincial Championship title
