= 2023 Prince Edward Island Scotties Tournament of Hearts =

2023 PEI Scotties Tournament of Hearts Women's Championship
- Host city: Crapaud, Prince Edward Island
- Arena: Crapaud Community Curling Club
- Dates: January 26–28
- Winner: Team Birt
- Curling club: Cornwall CC, Cornwall
- Skip: Marie Christianson
- Fourth: Suzanne Birt
- Second: Michelle Shea
- Lead: Meaghan Hughes
- Alternate: Sinead Dolan
- Coach: Danny Christianson
- Finalist: Darlene London

The 2023 PEI Scotties Tournament of Hearts Women's Championship, the women's provincial curling championship for Prince Edward Island, was held from January 26 to 28 at the Crapaud Community Curling Club in Crapaud, Prince Edward Island. The winning Suzanne Birt rink represented Prince Edward Island at the 2023 Scotties Tournament of Hearts in Kamloops, British Columbia, and finished seventh in Pool A with a 2–6 record. The event was held in conjunction with the 2023 PEI Tankard, the provincial men's championship.

This is the first time since 2021 that the event will be held due to the COVID-19 pandemic in Canada.

== Teams ==
The teams are listed as follows:

Skip	Third	Second	Lead	Alternate	Club
Suzanne Birt (Fourth)	Marie Christianson (Skip)	Michelle Shea	Meaghan Hughes	Sinead Dolan	Cornwall CC, Cornwall
Darlene London	Robyn MacDonald	Shelly Rice	Gail Greene		Montague CC, Montague
Rachel MacLean	Sydney Howatt	Lexie Murray	Beth Stokes		Cornwall CC, Cornwall
Melissa Morrow	Darcy Birch	Lindsay Spencer	Miranda Ellis		Silver Fox CC, Summerside

== Knockout Brackets ==
=== A Event ===
First Knockout
Team Birt	7
Rachel MacLean	3
Melissa Morrow	10
Darlene London	3

A Qualifier
Team Birt	8
Melissa Morrow	0

=== B Event ===
Second Knockout
Darlene London	2
Team Birt	10
Rachel MacLean	6
Melissa Morrow	8

B Qualifier
Team Birt	6
Melissa Morrow	4

=== C Event ===
Third Knockout
Rachel MacLean	2
Team Birt	5
Darlene London	9
Melissa Morrow	6

C Qualifier
Team Birt	9
Darlene London	2

== Knockout Results ==
All draw times are listed in Atlantic Time (UTC−04:00).

=== Draw 4 ===
Thursday, January 26, 9:00 am

Sheet A	1	2	3	4	5	6	7	8	9	10	Final
Team Birt	3	0	2	0	1	1	0	0	X	X	7
Rachel MacLean	0	1	0	1	0	0	0	1	X	X	3

Sheet B	1	2	3	4	5	6	7	8	9	10	Final
Melissa Morrow	1	1	0	1	2	0	0	2	3	X	10
Darlene London	0	0	2	0	0	1	0	0	0	X	3

=== Draw 6 ===
Thursday, January 26, 7:00 pm

Sheet C	1	2	3	4	5	6	7	8	9	10	Final
Team Birt	2	3	1	2	X	X	X	X	X	X	8
Melissa Morrow	0	0	0	0	X	X	X	X	X	X	0

=== Draw 7 ===
Friday, January 27, 9:00 am

Sheet C	1	2	3	4	5	6	7	8	9	10	Final
Rachel MacLean	2	0	1	0	0	0	0	2	1	0	6
Melissa Morrow	0	2	0	1	0	1	3	0	0	1	8

Sheet D	1	2	3	4	5	6	7	8	9	10	Final
Darlene London	0	0	0	0	2	0	X	X	X	X	2
Team Birt	3	1	2	1	0	3	X	X	X	X	10

=== Draw 9 ===
Friday, January 27, 7:00 pm

Sheet B	1	2	3	4	5	6	7	8	9	10	Final
Team Birt	0	1	1	0	0	2	0	1	1	X	6
Melissa Morrow	1	0	0	2	0	0	1	0	0	X	4

=== Draw 11 ===
Saturday, January 28, 2:00 pm

Sheet C	1	2	3	4	5	6	7	8	9	10	Final
Rachel MacLean	0	0	0	0	1	0	0	0	1	X	2
Team Birt	0	1	1	1	0	0	0	2	0	X	5

Sheet D	1	2	3	4	5	6	7	8	9	10	Final
Darlene London	1	2	0	0	0	2	0	2	2	X	9
Melissa Morrow	0	0	2	1	1	0	2	0	0	X	6

=== Draw 12 ===
Saturday, January 28, 7:00 pm

Sheet B	1	2	3	4	5	6	7	8	9	10	Final
Team Birt	1	2	0	1	0	3	2	X	X	X	9
Darlene London	0	0	1	0	1	0	0	X	X	X	2

== Playoffs ==
- No playoffs were required as the Suzanne Birt rink won all three qualifying events.

2023 PEI Scotties Tournament of Hearts

Team Birt
4th Prince Edward Island Provincial Championship title
