= 2013 PEI Tankard =

- Host city: Crapaud, Prince Edward Island
- Arena: Crapaud Community Curling Club
- Dates: February 6–12
- Winner: Eddie MacKenzie
- Curling club: Charlottetown Curling Complex
- Skip: Eddie MacKenzie
- Third: Anson Carmody
- Second: Alex MacFadyen
- Lead: Sean Ledgerwood
- Coach: Al Ledgerwood
- Finalist: Rod MacDonald

The 2013 PEI Tankard, the Prince Edward Island men's curling championship, was held from February 6 to 12 at the Crapaud Community Curling Club in Crapaud, Prince Edward Island. The winner of the Tankard, Team Eddie MacKenzie represented Prince Edward Island at the 2013 Tim Hortons Brier in Edmonton, Alberta.

== Postponements ==
Due to the February 2013 nor'easter that hit the island, games scheduled for February 9 and 10 were postponed until the 11th and 12th. The event was originally scheduled to end on February 10.

== Teams ==
The teams are listed as follows:

Skip	Third	Second	Lead	Alternate	Locale
Mel Bernard	Barry Cameron	Kevin Ellsworth	Earle Proude		Silver Fox Curling and Yacht Club, Summerside
Robert Campbell	John Likely	Erik Brodersen	Mike Dillon		Charlottetown Curling Complex, Charlottetown
Mike Gaudet	Tyler MacKenzie	Tyler Harris	Sean Clarey		Charlottetown Curling Complex, Charlottetown
Bill Hope	Ted MacFadyen	Craig Mackie	David Murphy		Cornwall Curling Club, Cornwall; Silver Fox Curling and Yacht Club, Summerside
Rod MacDonald	Kevin Champion	Mark O'Rourke	Andrew Robinson		Charlottetown Curling Complex, Charlottetown
Eddie MacKenzie	Anson Carmody	Alex MacFadyen	Sean Ledgerwood		Charlottetown Curling Complex, Charlottetown
Jamie Newson	Pat Lynch	Jeff Gallant	John Desrosiers		Charlottetown Curling Complex, Charlottetown
Robert Shaw	Phil Gorveatt	Dennis Watts	Robbie Younker		Charlottetown Curling Complex, Charlottetown
Calvin Smith (fourth)	Allan Inman (skip)	Adam Arsenault	Brad Ledgerwood		Crapaud Curling Club, Crapaud; Charlottetown Curling Complex, Charlottetown
Blair Weeks	Matthew Nabuurs	Connor MacPhee	Mark Victor	Eric Pidgeon	Charlottetown Curling Complex, Charlottetown

== Results ==
=== A Event ===
First Knockout
Shaw	7
Weeks	4
Campbell	7
Bernard	4

Quarterfinals
MacDonald	7
MacFadyen	4
Gaudet	4
Shaw	5
Newson	5
Campbell	6
Inman	1
MacKenzie	8

Semifinals
MacDonald	6
Shaw	5
Campbell	3
MacKenzie	9

Qualifier 1
MacDonald	5
MacKenzie	6

=== B Event ===
Second Knockout
Weeks	9
MacFadyen	1
Bernard	14
Inman	6

Quarterfinals
Weeks	6
Newson	5
Bernard	5
Gaudet	7

Semifinals
Shaw	7
Weeks	9
Campbell	3
Gaudet	7

To Qualifier 2
Weeks	2
Gaudet	5
Qualifier 2
Gaudet	8
MacDonald	11

=== C Event ===
Semifinals			Qualifier 3
			1	Campbell	6
2	Shaw	7		Gaudet	10
3	Campbell	8

Quarterfinals		Semifinals		Qualifier 4
MacFadyen	5
Bernard	12	Bernard	6
Inman	0	Newson	7
Newson	9			Newson	9
				Weeks	8

== Playoffs ==
Page playoff system
1	MacKenzie	7
2	MacDonald	2
3	Gaudet	7
4	Newson	9

Semifinal
2	MacDonald	8
4	Newson	2

Final
1	MacKenzie	7
2	MacDonald	6

=== 1 vs. 2 ===
February 11, 16:00

Sheet 3	1	2	3	4	5	6	7	8	9	10	Final
MacKenzie 🔨	1	0	0	1	1	0	1	1	2	X	7
MacDonald	0	0	1	0	0	1	0	0	0	X	2

=== 3 vs. 4 ===
February 11, 16:00

Sheet 1	1	2	3	4	5	6	7	8	9	10	11	Final
Gaudet	0	0	0	1	0	2	0	4	0	0	0	7
Newson 🔨	0	0	0	0	2	0	1	0	2	2	2	9

=== Semifinal ===
February 12, 11:00

Sheet 2	1	2	3	4	5	6	7	8	9	10	Final
MacDonald	3	1	0	2	0	2	X	X	X	X	8
Newson 🔨	0	0	1	0	1	0	X	X	X	X	2

=== Final ===
February 12, 16:00

Sheet 3	1	2	3	4	5	6	7	8	9	10	11	Final
MacKenzie	1	0	0	0	0	1	0	2	0	2	1	7
MacDonald 🔨	0	1	0	1	0	0	2	0	2	0	0	6

2013 PEI Tankard

Eddie MacKenzie
3rd Prince Edward Island Provincial Championship title
