= 2021 PEI Tankard =

2021 PEI Tankard Men's Championship
- Host city: O'Leary, Prince Edward Island
- Arena: Maple Leaf Curling Club
- Dates: January 29–30
- Winner: Team MacKenzie
- Curling club: Crapaud Community CC, Crapaud & Montague CC, Montague
- Skip: Eddie MacKenzie
- Third: Tyler Smith
- Second: Sean Ledgerwood
- Lead: Ryan Lowery
- Finalist: Blair Jay

The 2021 PEI Tankard, the men's provincial curling championship for Prince Edward Island, was held from January 29 to 30 at the Maple Leaf Curling Club in O'Leary, Prince Edward Island. The winning Eddie MacKenzie rink represented Prince Edward Island at the 2021 Tim Hortons Brier in Calgary, Alberta where they finished with a 1–7 record. The event was held in conjunction with the 2021 Prince Edward Island Scotties Tournament of Hearts, the provincial women's championship.

Due to the COVID-19 pandemic in Canada, many teams could not commit to the quarantine process in order to compete at the national championship. Only two teams, Blair Jay from the Silver Fox Curling Club and Eddie MacKenzie from the Crapaud Community Curling Club and Montague Curling Club entered the event. Team MacKenzie won the best of five series in just three games.

== Teams ==
The teams are listed as follows:

Skip	Third	Second	Lead	Club
Blair Jay	Chuck Jay	Jon Philip	Glenn Rogers	Silver Fox Curling Club, Summerside
Eddie MacKenzie	Tyler Smith	Sean Ledgerwood	Ryan Lowery	Crapaud Community Curling Club, Crapaud & Montague Curling Club, Montague

== Results ==
All draw times are listed in Atlantic Time (UTC−04:00).

=== Standings ===
Final Standings

Skip	W	L	PF	PA	Ends Won	Ends Lost	Blank Ends	Stolen Ends
Eddie MacKenzie	3	0	24	11	12	9	3	2
Blair Jay	0	3	11	24	9	12	3	1

=== Draw 1 ===
Friday, January 29, 4:00 pm

Sheet 4	1	2	3	4	5	6	7	8	9	10	Final
Blair Jay	0	0	0	2	0	1	0	1	0	X	4
Eddie MacKenzie 🔨	0	3	0	0	3	0	2	0	2	X	10

=== Draw 2 ===
Saturday, January 30, 11:00 am

Sheet 3	1	2	3	4	5	6	7	8	9	10	Final
Eddie MacKenzie	0	0	0	2	0	1	1	0	2	X	6
Blair Jay 🔨	0	1	0	0	0	0	0	2	0	X	3

=== Draw 3 ===
Saturday, January 30, 4:00 pm

Sheet 4	1	2	3	4	5	6	7	8	9	10	Final
Blair Jay	0	1	0	1	0	1	0	1	0	X	4
Eddie MacKenzie 🔨	1	0	2	0	0	0	3	0	2	X	8

2021 PEI Tankard
(Prince Edward Island)
Eddie MacKenzie
7th PEI Provincial Championship title
