= 2024 Prince Edward Island Scotties Tournament of Hearts =

2024 PEI Scotties Tournament of Hearts Women's Championship
- Host city: Summerside, Prince Edward Island
- Arena: Summerside Curling Club
- Dates: January 25–28
- Winner: Team DiCarlo
- Curling club: Crapaud Community CC, Crapaud
- Skip: Jane DiCarlo
- Fourth: Veronica Mayne
- Second: Sabrina Smith
- Lead: Whitney Jenkins
- Finalist: Amanda Power

The 2024 PEI Scotties Tournament of Hearts Women's Championship, the women's provincial curling championship for Prince Edward Island, was held from January 25 to 28 at the Summerside Curling Club in Summerside, Prince Edward Island. The event was held in conjunction with the 2024 PEI Tankard, the provincial men's championship.

The winning Jane DiCarlo rink represented Prince Edward Island at the 2024 Scotties Tournament of Hearts in Calgary, Alberta where they finished last in Pool A (and last overall) with an 0–8 record.

== Teams ==
The teams are listed as follows:

Skip	Third	Second	Lead	Alternate	Coach	Club
Sophie Blades	Ella Lenentine	Makiya Noonan	Erika Pater	Reid Hart	Robbie Lenentine	Summerside CC, Summerside
Tammy Dewar	Samantha Crook	Kaleigh MacKay	Sarah Doak	Danielle Collings		Cornwall CC, Cornwall
Veronica Mayne (Fourth)	Jane DiCarlo (Skip)	Sabrina Smith	Whitney Jenkins			Crapaud Community CC, Crapaud
Lauren Ferguson	Sydney Howatt	Aleya Quilty	Rachel O'Connor	Breanne Burgoyne	Pat Quilty	Cornwall CC, Cornwall
Darlene London	Robyn MacDonald	Shelly Rice	Gail Greene			Montague CC, Montague
Melissa Morrow	Darcee Birch	Michelle MacIntyre	Miranda Ellis	Kacey Gauthier		Crapaud Community CC, Crapaud
Amanda Power	Sara Spafford	Emily Best	Shelly Bradley	Janique LeBlanc		Cornwall CC, Cornwall
Jenny White	Lauren MacFadyen	Jackie Reid	Alison Griffin-Waddell			Crapaud Community CC, Crapaud

== Knockout brackets ==
=== A event ===
First Knockout	A Qualifier
Jane DiCarlo	9
Darlene London	2
Jane DiCarlo	9
Amanda Power	6
Amanda Power	8
Lauren Ferguson	5
Jane DiCarlo	6
Tammy Dewar	1
Jenny White	6
Melissa Morrow	7
Melissa Morrow	7
Tammy Dewar	8
Sophie Blades	5
Tammy Dewar	9

=== B event ===
Second Knockout	B Qualifier
Jane DiCarlo	6
Melissa Morrow	10	Melissa Morrow	7
Darlene London	5	Lauren Ferguson	9	Melissa Morrow	2
Lauren Ferguson	9	Amanda Power	8
Tammy Dewar	6
Amanda Power	8	Amanda Power	7
Jenny White	7	Sophie Blades	6
Sophie Blades	10

=== C event ===
Third Knockout	C Qualifier
Amanda Power	12
Jane DiCarlo	3	Sophie Blades	4
Darlene London	3	Sophie Blades	9	Amanda Power	7
Sophie Blades	10	Melissa Morrow	6
Melissa Morrow	10
Tammy Dewar	7	Tammy Dewar	4
Jenny White	11	Jenny White	6
Lauren Ferguson	5

== Knockout results ==
All draw times are listed in Atlantic Time (UTC−04:00).

=== Draw 1 ===
Thursday, January 25, 2:00 pm

Sheet 4	1	2	3	4	5	6	7	8	9	10	Final
Jane DiCarlo	3	2	0	0	2	0	1	1	X	X	9
Darlene London	0	0	1	0	0	1	0	0	X	X	2

Sheet 5	1	2	3	4	5	6	7	8	9	10	Final
Amanda Power	1	0	1	1	1	0	0	4	0	X	8
Lauren Ferguson	0	1	0	0	0	2	1	0	1	X	5

Sheet 6	1	2	3	4	5	6	7	8	9	10	Final
Jenny White	1	0	2	0	0	0	1	1	0	1	6
Melissa Morrow	0	3	0	0	1	1	0	0	2	0	7

=== Draw 2 ===
Thursday, January 25, 7:00 pm

Sheet 1	1	2	3	4	5	6	7	8	9	10	Final
Sophie Blades	1	0	2	0	1	0	1	0	0	X	5
Tammy Dewar	0	1	0	2	0	2	0	1	3	X	9

Sheet 2	1	2	3	4	5	6	7	8	9	10	Final
Jane DiCarlo	0	2	0	1	1	1	0	0	3	1	9
Amanda Power	1	0	1	0	0	0	3	1	0	0	6

Sheet 3	1	2	3	4	5	6	7	8	9	10	Final
Darlene London	0	3	0	1	0	0	0	1	X	X	5
Lauren Ferguson	1	0	1	0	4	1	2	0	X	X	9

=== Draw 3 ===
Friday, January 26, 9:00 am

Sheet 4	1	2	3	4	5	6	7	8	9	10	11	Final
Melissa Morrow	0	0	0	1	0	1	1	0	2	2	0	7
Tammy Dewar	2	1	0	0	3	0	0	1	0	0	1	8

Sheet 5	1	2	3	4	5	6	7	8	9	10	Final
Jenny White	0	1	0	1	0	2	2	1	0	0	7
Sophie Blades	1	0	3	0	3	0	0	0	2	1	10

=== Draw 4 ===
Friday, January 26, 2:00 pm

Sheet 1	1	2	3	4	5	6	7	8	9	10	Final
Amanda Power	0	2	1	1	0	2	0	0	1	1	8
Sophie Blades	2	0	0	0	1	0	3	0	0	0	6

Sheet 2	1	2	3	4	5	6	7	8	9	10	11	Final
Melissa Morrow	0	1	4	0	1	0	1	0	0	2	1	10
Lauren Ferguson	2	0	0	1	0	2	0	2	2	0	0	9

Sheet 3	1	2	3	4	5	6	7	8	9	10	Final
Jane DiCarlo	0	0	0	3	1	2	0	X	X	X	6
Tammy Dewar	0	0	0	0	0	0	1	X	X	X	1

=== Draw 5 ===
Friday, January 26, 7:00 pm

Sheet 3	1	2	3	4	5	6	7	8	9	10	Final
Darlene London	0	1	0	0	2	0	0	X	X	X	3
Sophie Blades	3	0	2	1	0	3	1	X	X	X	10

Sheet 4	1	2	3	4	5	6	7	8	9	10	Final
Jane DiCarlo	0	1	0	0	1	0	2	0	1	1	6
Melissa Morrow	1	0	3	0	0	1	0	2	0	0	7

Sheet 5	1	2	3	4	5	6	7	8	9	10	Final
Jenny White	0	1	2	2	0	0	3	0	3	X	11
Lauren Ferguson	2	0	0	0	2	0	0	1	0	X	5

Sheet 6	1	2	3	4	5	6	7	8	9	10	Final
Tammy Dewar	0	1	2	0	2	0	1	0	0	0	6
Amanda Power	1	0	0	2	0	1	0	1	1	1	7

=== Draw 6 ===
Saturday, January 27, 9:00 am

Sheet 4	1	2	3	4	5	6	7	8	9	10	Final
Tammy Dewar	0	0	0	1	0	3	0	1	0	2	7
Jenny White	0	0	1	0	2	0	2	0	1	0	6

Sheet 5	1	2	3	4	5	6	7	8	9	10	Final
Melissa Morrow	0	0	0	0	0	2	0	X	X	X	2
Amanda Power	0	0	1	2	1	0	4	X	X	X	8

Sheet 6	1	2	3	4	5	6	7	8	9	10	Final
Jane DiCarlo	2	0	0	1	0	0	0	0	0	X	3
Sophie Blades	0	1	1	0	1	2	1	2	1	X	9

=== Draw 7 ===
Saturday, January 27, 2:00 pm

Sheet 2	1	2	3	4	5	6	7	8	9	10	Final
Amanda Power	1	0	1	1	0	4	0	5	X	X	12
Sophie Blades	0	2	0	0	1	0	1	0	X	X	4

Sheet 3	1	2	3	4	5	6	7	8	9	10	Final
Melissa Morrow	0	2	0	3	2	0	0	3	X	X	10
Tammy Dewar	1	0	1	0	0	1	1	0	X	X	4

=== Draw 8 ===
Saturday, January 27, 7:00 pm

Sheet 4	1	2	3	4	5	6	7	8	9	10	Final
Amanda Power	2	0	0	2	1	0	0	0	1	1	7
Melissa Morrow	0	0	3	0	0	0	1	2	0	0	6

== Playoffs ==
As Team Power won both the B and C events, they have to be beaten twice in the playoffs

Semifinal			Final
			B	Amanda Power	8
A	Jane DiCarlo	4	A	Jane DiCarlo	9
C	Amanda Power	2

=== Semifinal ===
Sunday, January 28, 9:00 am

Sheet 3	1	2	3	4	5	6	7	8	9	10	Final
Jane DiCarlo	0	0	1	0	0	0	0	1	0	2	4
Amanda Power	0	0	0	2	0	0	0	0	0	0	2

=== Final ===
Sunday, January 28, 2:00 pm

Sheet 4	1	2	3	4	5	6	7	8	9	10	11	Final
Amanda Power	2	0	2	0	0	0	0	3	0	1	0	8
Jane DiCarlo	0	2	0	1	1	1	1	0	2	0	1	9

2024 PEI Scotties Tournament of Hearts

Jane DiCarlo
1st Prince Edward Island Provincial Championship title
