= 2024 PEI Tankard =

2024 PEI Tankard Men's Championship
- Host city: Summerside, Prince Edward Island
- Arena: Summerside Curling Club
- Dates: January 25–28
- Winner: Team Smith
- Curling club: Crapaud Community CC, Crapaud
- Skip: Tyler Smith
- Third: Adam Cocks
- Second: Christopher Gallant
- Lead: Ed White
- Finalist: Jamie Newson

The 2024 PEI Tankard, the men's provincial curling championship for Prince Edward Island, was held from January 25 to 28 at the Summerside Curling Club in Summerside, Prince Edward Island. The event was held in conjunction with the 2024 Prince Edward Island Scotties Tournament of Hearts, the provincial women's championship.

The winning Tyler Smith rink represented Prince Edward Island at the 2024 Montana's Brier in Regina, Saskatchewan where they finished tied for third in Pool B with a 5–3 record. Smith and his rink almost became the first team from PEI to make the playoffs since Peter MacDonald in 1996, but PEI lost their final round robin game, a winner-take-all game against Jamie Koe's Northwest Territories rink in an extra end 9–8.

== Teams ==
The teams are listed as follows:

| Skip | Third | Second | Lead | Alternate | Coach | Club |
|---|---|---|---|---|---|---|
| Tyler Harris | Tyler MacKenzie | Daniel MacFadyen | Nathan Hardy | | | Crapaud Community CC, Crapaud |
| Tim Hockin (Fourth) | Darren Higgins (Skip) | Mike Spencer | Alex MacFadyen | Jonathan Greenan | | Summerside CC, Summerside |
| Blair Jay | Corey Montgomery | Kent MacKay | Alan Montgomery | | | Summerside CC, Summerside |
| Jamie Newson | Chris Ellis | Jamie Stride | Greg Ellis | | | Crapaud Community CC, Crapaud |
| Calvin Smith | Anderson MacDougall | Tyson Smith | Nick Blanchard | | Susan Hubley | Crapaud Community CC, Crapaud |
| Tyler Smith | Adam Cocks | Christopher Gallant | Ed White | | | Crapaud Community CC, Crapaud |
| Steve vanOuwerkerk | Nick vanOuwerkerk | Sam Ramsay | Patrick Ramsay | Corey Miller | | Crapaud Community CC, Crapaud |

== Knockout Brackets ==
=== A Event ===
First Knockout | A Qualifier
Jamie Newson | 8
Calvin Smith | 6
Jamie Newson | 5
Darren Higgins | 9
Tyler Harris | 5
Darren Higgins | 8
Darren Higgins | 6
Tyler Smith | 11
Blair Jay | 7
Steve vanOuwerkerk | 9
Steve vanOuwerkerk | 3
Tyler Smith | 12

=== B Event ===
Second Knockout | B Qualifier
Tyler Smith | 8
Blair Jay | 4 | Jamie Newson | 2
Jamie Newson | 7 | Tyler Smith | 7
Tyler Harris | 4
Darren Higgins | 6
Steve vanOuwerkerk | 7 | Tyler Harris | 10
Calvin Smith | 9 | Tyler Harris | 8
Tyler Harris | 11

=== C Event ===
Third Knockout | C Qualifier
Tyler Smith | 9
Steve vanOuwerkerk | 6 | Darren Higgins | 1
Darren Higgins | 9 | Tyler Smith | 8
Jamie Newson | 3
Tyler Harris | 7
Jamie Newson | 9 | Jamie Newson | 11
Calvin Smith | 8 | Blair Jay | 3
Blair Jay | 9

== Knockout Results ==
All draw times are listed in Atlantic Time (UTC−04:00).

=== Draw 1 ===
Thursday, January 25, 2:00 pm

| Sheet 1 | 1 | 2 | 3 | 4 | 5 | 6 | 7 | 8 | 9 | 10 | Final |
|---|---|---|---|---|---|---|---|---|---|---|---|
| Jamie Newson 🔨 | 0 | 1 | 0 | 0 | 1 | 0 | 3 | 1 | 1 | 1 | 8 |
| Calvin Smith | 0 | 0 | 2 | 1 | 0 | 3 | 0 | 0 | 0 | 0 | 6 |

| Sheet 2 | 1 | 2 | 3 | 4 | 5 | 6 | 7 | 8 | 9 | 10 | Final |
|---|---|---|---|---|---|---|---|---|---|---|---|
| Tyler Harris | 0 | 0 | 0 | 1 | 2 | 0 | 0 | 1 | 1 | 0 | 5 |
| Darren Higgins 🔨 | 0 | 3 | 1 | 0 | 0 | 1 | 1 | 0 | 0 | 2 | 8 |

| Sheet 3 | 1 | 2 | 3 | 4 | 5 | 6 | 7 | 8 | 9 | 10 | Final |
|---|---|---|---|---|---|---|---|---|---|---|---|
| Blair Jay | 0 | 2 | 1 | 0 | 2 | 0 | 0 | 1 | 0 | 1 | 7 |
| Steve vanOuwerkerk 🔨 | 2 | 0 | 0 | 4 | 0 | 1 | 0 | 0 | 2 | 0 | 9 |

=== Draw 2 ===
Thursday, January 25, 7:00 pm

| Sheet 4 | 1 | 2 | 3 | 4 | 5 | 6 | 7 | 8 | 9 | 10 | Final |
|---|---|---|---|---|---|---|---|---|---|---|---|
| Steve vanOuwerkerk | 0 | 0 | 2 | 0 | 1 | 0 | 0 | X | X | X | 3 |
| Tyler Smith 🔨 | 3 | 1 | 0 | 2 | 0 | 2 | 4 | X | X | X | 12 |

| Sheet 5 | 1 | 2 | 3 | 4 | 5 | 6 | 7 | 8 | 9 | 10 | Final |
|---|---|---|---|---|---|---|---|---|---|---|---|
| Calvin Smith | 0 | 3 | 0 | 0 | 3 | 0 | 0 | 3 | 0 | 0 | 9 |
| Tyler Harris 🔨 | 1 | 0 | 1 | 3 | 0 | 1 | 3 | 0 | 1 | 1 | 11 |

| Sheet 6 | 1 | 2 | 3 | 4 | 5 | 6 | 7 | 8 | 9 | 10 | Final |
|---|---|---|---|---|---|---|---|---|---|---|---|
| Jamie Newson | 1 | 0 | 0 | 0 | 0 | 0 | 3 | 1 | 0 | X | 5 |
| Darren Higgins 🔨 | 0 | 0 | 3 | 1 | 1 | 1 | 0 | 0 | 3 | X | 9 |

=== Draw 3 ===
Friday, January 26, 9:00 am

| Sheet 1 | 1 | 2 | 3 | 4 | 5 | 6 | 7 | 8 | 9 | 10 | Final |
|---|---|---|---|---|---|---|---|---|---|---|---|
| Blair Jay | 1 | 0 | 3 | 0 | 0 | 0 | 0 | 0 | 0 | X | 4 |
| Jamie Newson 🔨 | 0 | 2 | 0 | 0 | 2 | 0 | 1 | 1 | 1 | X | 7 |

| Sheet 2 | 1 | 2 | 3 | 4 | 5 | 6 | 7 | 8 | 9 | 10 | Final |
|---|---|---|---|---|---|---|---|---|---|---|---|
| Darren Higgins | 0 | 2 | 0 | 1 | 1 | 0 | 1 | 0 | 1 | 0 | 6 |
| Tyler Smith 🔨 | 2 | 0 | 1 | 0 | 0 | 2 | 0 | 2 | 0 | 4 | 11 |

| Sheet 3 | 1 | 2 | 3 | 4 | 5 | 6 | 7 | 8 | 9 | 10 | Final |
|---|---|---|---|---|---|---|---|---|---|---|---|
| Steve vanOuwerkerk | 0 | 0 | 1 | 1 | 1 | 1 | 0 | 0 | 3 | 0 | 7 |
| Tyler Harris 🔨 | 2 | 1 | 0 | 0 | 0 | 0 | 2 | 1 | 0 | 2 | 8 |

=== Draw 4 ===
Friday, January 26, 2:00 pm

| Sheet 4 | 1 | 2 | 3 | 4 | 5 | 6 | 7 | 8 | 9 | 10 | Final |
|---|---|---|---|---|---|---|---|---|---|---|---|
| Darren Higgins | 0 | 2 | 0 | 1 | 0 | 1 | 0 | 2 | 0 | X | 6 |
| Tyler Harris 🔨 | 1 | 0 | 2 | 0 | 1 | 0 | 4 | 0 | 2 | X | 10 |

| Sheet 5 | 1 | 2 | 3 | 4 | 5 | 6 | 7 | 8 | 9 | 10 | Final |
|---|---|---|---|---|---|---|---|---|---|---|---|
| Tyler Smith | 1 | 2 | 0 | 1 | 0 | 0 | 2 | 2 | X | X | 8 |
| Jamie Newson 🔨 | 0 | 0 | 1 | 0 | 1 | 0 | 0 | 0 | X | X | 2 |

| Sheet 6 | 1 | 2 | 3 | 4 | 5 | 6 | 7 | 8 | 9 | 10 | Final |
|---|---|---|---|---|---|---|---|---|---|---|---|
| Calvin Smith | 0 | 1 | 0 | 3 | 0 | 1 | 0 | 2 | 0 | 1 | 8 |
| Blair Jay 🔨 | 2 | 0 | 1 | 0 | 3 | 0 | 1 | 0 | 2 | 0 | 9 |

=== Draw 6 ===
Saturday, January 27, 9:00 am

| Sheet 1 | 1 | 2 | 3 | 4 | 5 | 6 | 7 | 8 | 9 | 10 | Final |
|---|---|---|---|---|---|---|---|---|---|---|---|
| Steve vanOuwerkerk | 0 | 2 | 0 | 0 | 1 | 1 | 1 | 0 | 1 | X | 6 |
| Darren Higgins 🔨 | 2 | 0 | 4 | 1 | 0 | 0 | 0 | 2 | 0 | X | 9 |

| Sheet 2 | 1 | 2 | 3 | 4 | 5 | 6 | 7 | 8 | 9 | 10 | Final |
|---|---|---|---|---|---|---|---|---|---|---|---|
| Jamie Newson 🔨 | 2 | 2 | 0 | 2 | 2 | 1 | X | X | X | X | 9 |
| Blair Jay | 0 | 0 | 3 | 0 | 0 | 0 | X | X | X | X | 3 |

| Sheet 3 | 1 | 2 | 3 | 4 | 5 | 6 | 7 | 8 | 9 | 10 | Final |
|---|---|---|---|---|---|---|---|---|---|---|---|
| Tyler Smith 🔨 | 0 | 0 | 3 | 0 | 2 | 0 | 1 | 1 | 0 | X | 7 |
| Tyler Harris | 1 | 1 | 0 | 1 | 0 | 0 | 0 | 0 | 1 | X | 4 |

=== Draw 7 ===
Saturday, January 27, 2:00 pm

| Sheet 4 | 1 | 2 | 3 | 4 | 5 | 6 | 7 | 8 | 9 | 10 | Final |
|---|---|---|---|---|---|---|---|---|---|---|---|
| Tyler Smith 🔨 | 2 | 2 | 2 | 0 | 3 | X | X | X | X | X | 9 |
| Darren Higgins | 0 | 0 | 0 | 1 | 0 | X | X | X | X | X | 1 |

| Sheet 5 | 1 | 2 | 3 | 4 | 5 | 6 | 7 | 8 | 9 | 10 | Final |
|---|---|---|---|---|---|---|---|---|---|---|---|
| Tyler Harris 🔨 | 2 | 0 | 0 | 0 | 0 | 3 | 0 | 2 | 0 | 0 | 7 |
| Jamie Newson | 0 | 3 | 1 | 2 | 1 | 0 | 2 | 0 | 1 | 1 | 11 |

=== Draw 8 ===
Saturday, January 27, 7:00 pm

| Sheet 3 | 1 | 2 | 3 | 4 | 5 | 6 | 7 | 8 | 9 | 10 | Final |
|---|---|---|---|---|---|---|---|---|---|---|---|
| Tyler Smith | 0 | 1 | 0 | 3 | 0 | 1 | 0 | 3 | X | X | 8 |
| Jamie Newson 🔨 | 0 | 0 | 1 | 0 | 1 | 0 | 1 | 0 | X | X | 3 |

== Playoffs ==
No playoff was needed as Team Smith won all three events.

| Semifinal | | Final |
| | | A | Tyler Smith |
| B | Tyler Smith |
| C | Tyler Smith |

2024 PEI Tankard

Tyler Smith
2nd Prince Edward Island Provincial Championship title
