= Tyler Smith (curler) =

Canadian curler (born 1998)

- Curler
- Born: August 20, 1998 (age 28); Charlottetown, Prince Edward Island, Canada

Team
- Curling club: Crapaud Community Curling Club, Crapaud, PEI
- Skip: Tyler Smith
- Third: Adam Cocks
- Second: Chris Gallant
- Lead: Ed White

Curling career
- Member Association: Prince Edward Island
- Brier: 6 (2021, 2022, 2023, 2024, 2025, 2026)

Tyler Smith (born August 20, 1998) is a Canadian curler from Hunter River, Prince Edward Island. He currently plays skip for his own team.

== Career ==
At the age of 11, Smith got the opportunity to compete as a skip at the 2011 Canada Winter Games. Smith then also got the opportunity to compete in the 2015 Canada Winter Games, representing PEI as the skip.

Smith made his debut at the Brier, the Canadian men's national championship, in 2021. He got the opportunity to play as the third for PEI-veteran Eddie MacKenzie. They finished the Brier with a record of 1–7, only beating Peter Mackey of Nunavut.

Smith made his debut as a skip at the Brier in 2022 through an automatic berth due to the tournament getting cancelled over the COVID-19 pandemic. In the tournament that year, Smith once again finished with a record of 1–7. This year he only beat Nathan Young of Newfoundland and Labrador. In 2023, Smith returned to the PEI Men's Curling Championship. He got through the 2023 PEI Tankard easily, by making the Darren Higgins rink forfeit in the finals. At the Brier that year, he finished with an improved 2–6 record. In 2024, Smith won all three events in the 2024 PEI Tankard and qualified for the Brier once again. They started off with a 4–1 record, and finished with an 5–3 record and barely missed out on the playoffs. Smith won his 4th consecutive provincial title at the 2025 PEI Men's Curling Championship, and Team Smith once again represented PEI at the 2025 Montana's Brier, where they would finish the round robin with a record of 1–7.

== Personal life ==
Smith owns and operates Smith's Excavating in Hunter River.
