= Crapaud, Prince Edward Island =

Crapaud
- Rural municipality
- Crapaud in Prince Edward Island
- Coordinates: 46°14′21.22″N 63°29′58.57″W
- Country: Canada
- Province: Prince Edward Island
- County: Queens County
- Lot: 29

Area
  - Rural municipality: 2.1 km^{2} (0.81 sq mi)
  - Metro: 206.23 km^{2} (79.63 sq mi)

Population
  - Rural municipality: 361
  - Density: 172.3/km^{2} (446/sq mi)
  - Metro: 2,473
  - Metro density: 12/km^{2} (31/sq mi)
- Time zone: AST
  - Summer (DST): ADT
- Area code: 902
- Telephone Exchange: 658 730

Crapaud (/kræˈpoʊ/ KRA-poh) is a rural municipality in Prince Edward Island, Canada. It is located north of Victoria in the township of Lot 29.

== Demographics ==
Federal census population history of Crapaud
Year	Pop.	±%
1956	178	—
1961	201	+12.9%
1966	239	+18.9%
1971	246	+2.9%
1976	321	+30.5%
1981	303	−5.6%
1986	332	+9.6%
1991	323	−2.7%
1996	378	+17.0%
2001	382	+1.1%
2006	353	−7.6%
2011	345	−2.3%
2016	319	−7.5%
2021	361	+13.2%
Source: Statistics Canada

In the 2021 Census of Population conducted by Statistics Canada, Crapaud had a population of 361 living in 136 of its 158 total private dwellings, a change of 13.2% from its 2016 population of 319. With a land area of 2.1 km^{2} (0.81 sq mi), it had a population density of 171.9/km^{2} (445.2/sq mi) in 2021.

== Crapaud Exhibition ==
The town of Crapaud hosts its own annual exhibition with notable events such as the Tractor Pulls, in which contestants build or modify tractors in order to pull as much weight as possible over a short distance. Some other events that can be seen are barrel racing, tractor races, and a potato peeling contest. The event is held every summer.
