= Wilhelm Næss =

Norwegian curler (born 1994)

- Curler ♂
- Born: 21 August 1994 (age 32); Orkdal, Norway

Team
- Curling club: Oppdal CC (Oppdal)
- Skip: Andreas Hårstad
- Third: Wilhelm Næss
- Second: Michael Mellemseter
- Lead: Mathias Brænden

Curling career
- Member Association: Norway
- World Championship: 4 (2023, 2024, 2025, 2026)
- World Mixed Championship: 3 (2017, 2018, 2019)
- European Championship: 3 (2023, 2024, 2025)
- World Junior Curling Championship: 3 (2013, 2014, 2015)
- Olympic: 1 (2026)
- Other appearances: Winter World University Games: 1 (2013)
Medal record
Curling
World Mixed Championship
Bronze medal – third place	2019 Aberdeen
European Championships
Bronze medal – third place	2024 Lohja
World Junior Championships
Bronze medal – third place	2014 Flims
Norwegian Men's Curling Championship
Silver medal – second place	2014 ...
Silver medal – second place	2024 Oslo
Silver medal – second place	2026 Lillehammer

Wilhelm Næss (born 21 August 1994 in Orkdal) is a Norwegian male curler from Oppdal.

At the national level, he is a three-time Norwegian mixed champion curler.

== Teams and events ==
=== Men's ===
Season	Skip	Third	Second	Lead	Alternate	Coach	Events
2012–13	Eirik Mjøen	Martin Sesaker	Wilhelm Næss	Markus Skogvold	Gaute Nepstad	Ole Ingvaldsen	WJCC 2013 (5th)
2013–14	Markus Høiberg	Steffen Walstad	Magnus Nedregotten	Sander Rølvåg	Wilhelm Næss	Ole Ingvaldsen	WUG 2013 (4th)
2013–14	Eirik Mjøen	Markus Skogvold	Martin Sesaker	Wilhelm Næss	Gaute Nepstad	Stein Mellemseter (WJCC)	WJCC 2014 (bronze); NMCC 2014 (silver)
2014–15	Markus Skogvold (fourth)	Martin Sesaker	Wilhelm Næss	Gaute Nepstad (skip)	Peder Siksjoe	Stein Mellemseter	WJCC 2015 (6th)
2016–17	Stig Høiberg	Steffen Mellemseter	Anders Bjørgum	Wilhelm Næss	Sondre Snøve Høiberg		NMCC 2017 (14th)
2017–18	Steffen Mellemseter	Wilhelm Næss	Martin Sesaker	Harald Skarsheim Rian	Eirik Mjøen		NMCC 2018 (6th)
2018–19	Steffen Mellemseter	Wilhelm Næss	Harald Skarsheim Rian	Sander Rølvåg	Martin Sesaker		NMCC 2019 (13th)
2019–20	Steffen Mellemseter	Wilhelm Næss	Harald Skarsheim Rian	Eirik Mjøen	Jørgen Myran		NMCC 2020 (5th)
2021–22	Steffen Mellemseter	Ingebrikt Bjørnstad	Wilhelm Næss	Harald Skarsheim Rian			NMCC 2022 (7th)
2022–23	Andreas Hårstad	Michael Mellemseter	Wilhelm Næss	Emil Kvål			NMCC 2023 (4th)
2022–23	Magnus Ramsfjell	Martin Sesaker	Bendik Ramsfjell	Gaute Nepstad	Wilhelm Næss	Thomas Løvold, Pål Trulsen	WCC 2023 (5th)
2023–24	Andreas Hårstad	Mathias Brænden	Michael Mellemseter	Wilhelm Næss	Emil Kvål		NMCC 2024 (silver)
2023–24	Magnus Ramsfjell	Martin Sesaker	Bendik Ramsfjell	Gaute Nepstad	Wilhelm Næss	Thomas Løvold (ECC, WCC), Bent Ånund Ramsfjell (WCC)	ECC 2023 (5th); WCC 2024 (10th)
2024–25	Andreas Hårstad	Wilhelm Næss	Michael Mellemseter	Mathias Brænden			NMCC 2025 (4th)
2024–25	Magnus Ramsfjell	Martin Sesaker	Bendik Ramsfjell	Gaute Nepstad	Wilhelm Næss	Thomas Løvold	ECC 2024 (bronze); WCC 2025 (6th)

=== Mixed ===
Season	Skip	Third	Second	Lead	Coach	Events
2016–17	Wilhelm Næss (fourth)	Ingvild Skaga (skip)	Martin Sesaker	Eirin Mesloe		NMxCC 2017 (gold)
2017–18	Wilhelm Næss (fourth)	Ingvild Skaga (skip)	Martin Sesaker	Eirin Mesloe	Vegard Mesloe	WMxCC 2017 (4th); NMxCC 2018 (gold)
2018–19	Wilhelm Næss (fourth)	Ingvild Skaga (skip)	Martin Sesaker	Eirin Mesloe		WMxCC 2018 (4th)
2018–19	Wilhelm Næss (fourth)	Ingvild Skaga (skip)	Harald Skarsheim Rian	Eirin Mesloe		NMxCC 2019 (gold)
2019–20	Wilhelm Næss (fourth)	Ingvild Skaga (skip)	Harald Skarsheim Rian	Eirin Mesloe		WMxCC 2019 (bronze)
2022–23	Andreas Hårstad	Eirin Mesloe	Wilhelm Næss	Nina Aune		NMxCC 2023 (silver)

=== Mixed doubles ===
Season	Female	Male	Events
2019–20	Eirin Mesloe	Wilhelm Næss	NMDCC 2020 (7th)
2021–22	Eirin Mesloe	Wilhelm Næss	
2022–23	Eirin Mesloe	Wilhelm Næss	NMDCC 2023 (5th)
2023–24	Eirin Mesloe	Wilhelm Næss	NMDCC 2024 (6th)

== Personal life ==
As of 2025, he is a carpenter. He started curling in 2005 at the age of 11.
