= Norwegian Men's Curling Championship =

National curling championship

The Norwegian Men's Curling Championship (Norwegian: Norgesmesterskap i curling for herrer), known as the King's Trophy, is the national championship of men's curling in Norway. It has been held annually since 1957. It is organized by the Norwegian Curling Association (Norwegian: Norges Curlingforbund).

== List of champions and medallists ==
(Team line-up in order: skip (marked bold), third, second, lead, alternate(s), coach)

| Year | Champion team | Runner-up | Bronze |
|---|---|---|---|
| 1957 | Essen CK (Oslo); Arne Holst, Einar Bentzen, Arne Ramstad, Rolf Carlem | | |
| 1958 | Oppdal CK (Oppdal); Freddie Johannessen, Ola Ekle, Julius Johnsen, Olav Odden | | |
| 1959 | Stabekk CK; Leif Uggen, Odd Stranberg, Th. Ihle-Hansen, Josef Bjaanæs | | |
| 1960 | Oslo CK; Rolf C. Christensen, Finn Blakstad, Rolf Lonnevlg, Magne Haf-stad | | |
| 1961 | Oppdal CK (Oppdal); Olav Odden, Hallvard Røddesnes, Embret Dørum, Ola Ekle | | |
| 1962 | Oppdal CK (Oppdal); Olav Odden, Hallvard Røddesnes, Embret Dørum, Ola Ekle | | |
| 1963 | Trondheim CK; Ola Lefstad, Johan P. Leistad, N. P. Weidemann, Henrik E. Møller | | |
| 1964 | Oppdal CK (Oppdal); Per B. Holaker | | |
| 1965 | Frogner; Ulf Engh | | |
| 1966 | Trondheim; Nils P. Weidemann | | |
| 1967 | Geilo; Erling Brusletto | | |
| 1968 | Bygdøy; Thor Ø. Andresen | | |
| 1969 | Bygdøy; Erik Gyllenhammer | | |
| 1970 | Stabæk; Josef Bjaanæs | | |
| 1971 | Stabæk; Knut Bjaanaes | | |
| 1972 | Stabæk; Knut Bjaanaes | | |
| 1973 | Bærum; Helmer Strømbo | | |
| 1974 | Brumunddal; Sjur Loen | | |
| 1975 | Bærum; Helmer Strømbo | | |
| 1976 | Trondheim; Kristian Sørum | | |
| 1977 | Trondheim; Kristian Sørum | | |
| 1978 | Trondheim; Kristian Sørum | | |
| 1979 | Bygdøy; Kristian Sørum | | |
| 1980 | Bygdøy; Kristian Sørum | | |
| 1981 | Bygdøy; Kristian Sørum | | |
| 1982 | Brumunddal; Sjur Loen | | |
| 1983 | Snarøen CK (Oslo); Eigil Ramsfjell, Sjur Loen, Gunnar Meland, Bo Bakke | | |
| 1984 | Snarøen CK (Oslo); Eigil Ramsfjell, Sjur Loen, Gunnar Meland, Bo Bakke | | |
| 1985 | Brumunddal; Kristian Sørum | | |
| 1986 | Risenga; Tormod Andreassen | | |
| 1987 | Snarøen CK (Oslo); Eigil Ramsfjell, Sjur Loen, Morten Søgård, Bo Bakke | | |
| 1988 | Snarøen CK (Oslo); Eigil Ramsfjell, Sjur Loen, Morten Søgård, Bo Bakke | | |
| 1989 | Snarøen CK (Oslo); Eigil Ramsfjell, Sjur Loen, Morten Søgård, Bo Bakke | | |
| 1990 | Snarøen CK (Oslo); Eigil Ramsfjell, Sjur Loen, Niclas Järund, Morten Skaug | | |
| 1991 | Snarøen CK (Oslo); Eigil Ramsfjell, Sjur Loen, Niclas Järund, Morten Skaug | | |
| 1992 | Stabæk; Kristian Sørum | | |
| 1993 | Risenga; Tormod Andreassen | | |
| 1994 | Risenga; Tormod Andreassen | | |
| 1995 | Snarøen CK (Oslo); Eigil Ramsfjell, Anthon Grimsmo, Jan Thoresen, Tore Torvbråten | | |
| 1996 | Snarøen CK (Oslo); Eigil Ramsfjell, Anthon Grimsmo, Jan Thoresen, Tore Torvbråten | | |
| 1997 | Stabæk; Pål Trulsen, Lars Vågberg, Bent Ånund Ramsfjell, Knut Ivar Moe, Morten Halsa | | |
| 1998 | Snarøen CK (Oslo); Thomas Ulsrud, Thomas Due, Torger Nergård, Johan Høstmælingen, Rolf Andreas Lauten | | |
| 1999 | Stabæk; Pål Trulsen, Lars Vågberg, Flemming Davanger, Bent Ånund Ramsfjell | | |
| 2000 | Snarøen CK (Oslo); Thomas Ulsrud, Thomas Due, Torger Nergård, Johan Høstmælingen | | |
| 2001 | Stabæk; Pål Trulsen, Lars Vågberg, Flemming Davanger, Bent Ånund Ramsfjell | | |
| 2002 | Stabæk; Pål Trulsen, Lars Vågberg, Flemming Davanger, Bent Ånund Ramsfjell | | |
| 2003 | Snarøen CK (Oslo); Thomas Ulsrud, Torger Nergård, Thomas Due, Johan Høstmælingen | | |
| 2004 | Snarøen CK (Oslo); Johan Høstmælingen | | |
| 2005 | Stabæk; Pål Trulsen, Lars Vågberg, Flemming Davanger, Bent Ånund Ramsfjell | | |
| 2006 | Snarøen CK (Oslo); Thomas Ulsrud, Torger Nergård, Thomas Due, Jan Thoresen | | |
| 2007 | Snarøen CK (Oslo); Thomas Ulsrud, Torger Nergård, Thomas Due, Jan Thoresen | | |
| 2008 | Snarøen CK (Oslo); Thomas Ulsrud, Torger Nergård, Christoffer Svae, Håvard Vad Petersson | | |
| 2009 | Snarøen CK (Oslo); Thomas Ulsrud, Torger Nergård, Christoffer Svae, Håvard Vad Petersson | | |
| 2010 | Snarøen CK (Oslo); Torger Nergård | | |
| 2011 | Snarøen CK (Oslo); Thomas Ulsrud, Torger Nergård, Christoffer Svae, Håvard Vad Petersson | | |
| 2012 | Snarøen CK (Oslo); Thomas Ulsrud, Torger Nergård, Christoffer Svae, Håvard Vad Petersson | | |
| 2013 | Snarøen CK (Oslo); Thomas Ulsrud, Torger Nergård, Christoffer Svae, Håvard Vad Petersson | | |
| 2014 | Snarøen CK (Oslo); Thomas Ulsrud, Torger Nergård, Christoffer Svae, Håvard Vad Petersson | | |
| 2015 | Snarøen CK (Oslo); Thomas Ulsrud, Torger Nergård, Christoffer Svae, Håvard Vad Petersson | | |
| 2016 | Minera Skifer /Walstad, Oppdal CK (Oppdal); Steffen Walstad, Markus Høiberg, Magnus Nedregotten, Alexander Lindström, coach: Thomas Løvold | Lag Ulsrud, Snarøen CK (Oslo); Thomas Ulsrud, Torger Nergård, Christoffer Svae, Håvard Vad Petersson, coach: Petter Moe | Lag Mjøen, Oppdal CK (Oppdal); Eirik Mjøen, Sander Rølvåg, Martin Sesaker, Markus Skogvold |
| 2017 | Minera Skifer /Walstad, Oppdal CK (Oppdal); Steffen Walstad, Markus Høiberg, Magnus Nedregotten, Alexander Lindström, coach: Thomas Løvold | Lag Ulsrud, Snarøen CK (Oslo); Thomas Ulsrud, Torger Nergård, Christoffer Svae, Håvard Vad Petersson, coach: Petter Moe | Lag Ramsfjell, Jar CK; Magnus Ramsfjell, Bendik Ramsfjell, Magnus Trulsen Vågberg, Eskil Vintervold, alternate: Elias Høstmælingen |
| 2018 | Minera Skifer / Walstad, Oppdal CK (Oppdal); Steffen Walstad, Markus Høiberg, Magnus Nedregotten, Magnus Vågberg | Lag Ulsrud, Snarøen CK (Oslo); Thomas Ulsrud, Torger Nergård, Anders Bjørgum, Håvard Vad Petersson | Toyota Bilia / Ramsfjell, Oppdal CK (Oppdal); Magnus Ramsfjell, Kristian Foss, Michael Mellemseter, Andreas Hårstad, alternate: Jørgen Myran |
| 2019 | Toyota Bilia / Ramsfjell, Oppdal CK (Oppdal); Magnus Ramsfjell, Michael Mellemseter, Andreas Hårstad, Jørgen Myran | Lag Ulsrud, Snarøen CK (Oslo); Thomas Ulsrud, Torger Nergård, Christoffer Svae, Håvard Vad Petersson | Lag Brænden, Lillehammer CK (Lillehammer); Mathias Brænden, Niclas Nordhagen, Ådne Birketveit, Elias Høstmælinen |
| 2020 | Trondheim; Magnus Ramsfjell, Torger Nergård, Martin Sesaker, Bendik Ramsfjell | Oppdal; Thomas Ulsrud, Steffen Walstad, Markus Høiberg, Magnus Vågberg | Lillehammer; Grunde Buraas, Lukas Høstmælingen, Tinius Haslev Nordbye, Magnus Lillebø |
| 2022 | Trondheim; Magnus Ramsfjell, Martin Sesaker, Bendik Ramsfjell, Gaute Nepstad | Oslo; Steffen Walstad, Torger Nergård, Markus Høiberg, Magnus Vågberg | Lillehammer; Lukas Høstmælingen, Grunde Buraas, Magnus Lillebø, Tinius Haslev Nordbye |
| 2023 | Trondheim CK; Magnus Ramsfjell, Martin Sesaker, Bendik Ramsfjell, Gaute Nepstad | Lillehammer CK; Grunde Burås, Lukas Høstmælingen, Tinius Nordbye, Magnus Lillebø, Sander Lunde Moen | Oppdal CK; Steffen Walstad, Torger Nergård, Mathias Brænden, Magnus Vågberg, Anders Bjørgum |
| 2024 | Oppdal CK; Magnus Nedregotten, Steffen Walstad, Håvard Vad Petersson, Torger Nergård, Markus Høiberg | Oppdal CK; Andreas Hårstad, Mathias Brænden, Michael Mellemseter, Wilhelm Næss, Emil M. Kvål | Trondheim CK; Magnus Ramsfjell, Martin Sesaker, Bendik Ramsfjell, Gaute Nepstad |
| 2025 | Lillehammer CK; Lukas Høstmælingen, Grunde Buraas, Magnus Lillebø, Tinius Nordbye | Trondheim CK; Magnus Ramsfjell, Martin Sesaker, Bendik Ramsfjell, Gaute Nepstad | Snarøen CC; Steffen Walstad, Magnus Nedregotten, Torger Nergård, Martin Davanger |
| 2026 | Trondheim CK; Magnus Ramsfjell, Martin Sesaker, Bendik Ramsfjell, Gaute Nepstad | Oppdal CK; Andreas Hårstad, Willhelm Næss, Michael Mellemseter, Mathias Brænden | Lillehammer CK; Grunde Buraas, Magnus Nedregotten, Sander Rølvåg, Harald Dæhlin |

== See also ==
- Norwegian Women's Curling Championship
- Norwegian Mixed Curling Championship
- Norwegian Mixed Doubles Curling Championship
- Norwegian Junior Mixed Doubles Curling Championship
