= Magnus Vågberg =

Norwegian curler

- Curler
- Born: 23 December 1995 (age 30); Oslo, Norway

Team
- Curling club: Oppdal CK, Oppdal, NOR
- Skip: Steffen Walstad
- Third: Magnus Nedregotten
- Second: Mathias Brænden
- Lead: Magnus Vågberg
- Alternate: Andreas Hårstad

Curling career
- Member Association: Norway
- World Championship: 2 (2018, 2021)
- European Championship: 4 (2018, 2019, 2021, 2022)
- Olympic: 1 (2022)
Medal record
Men's curling
Representing Norway
World Junior Championships
Bronze medal – third place	2017 Pyeongchang
Norwegian Men's Championships
Gold medal – first place	2018 Lillehammer
Silver medal – second place	2020 Oslo
Silver medal – second place	2022 Trondheim
Bronze medal – third place	2017 Lillehammer
Bronze medal – third place	2023 Oppdal

Magnus Trulsen Vågberg (born 23 December 1995) is a Norwegian curler from Bærums Verk. He currently plays lead for the Steffen Walstad rink.

== Career ==
=== Juniors ===
Vågberg competed for Norway in two World Junior Curling Championships, playing second on Team Magnus Ramsfjell. At the 2016 World Junior Curling Championships, the team finished with a 5–4 record, missing the playoffs. At the 2017 World Junior Curling Championships, the team had much more success, finishing the round robin with a 6–3 record, and then after losing to Scotland in the 3 vs. 4 game, they would defeat the Scots in a re-match to claim the bronze medal.

=== Men's ===
After juniors, Vågberg joined the Walstad rink. The team would make it to the finals of the 2017 GSOC Tour Challenge, his first career Grand Slam event, losing to Brad Gushue. Later in the season, the team would represent Norway at the 2018 World Men's Curling Championship, where they finished in fifth place.

Vågberg played lead on Team Norway at the 2018 and 2019 European Curling Championships. In 2018, his team just missed the playoffs with a 5–4 record and in 2019, they once again finished 5–4. Vågberg returned to the Worlds in 2021 at the 2021 World Men's Curling Championship where his team of skip Steffen Walstad, third Torger Nergård and second Markus Høiberg finished in eighth with a 7–6 record.

== Personal life ==
He is the son of curlers Trine Trulsen Vågberg and Lars Vågberg. He represented the curling club Jar IL before joining Oppdal Curlingklubb.
