= Johan Høstmælingen =

Norwegian curler

- Curler ♂
- Born: November 16, 1971 (age 54); Lillehammer

Team
- Curling club: Snarøyen CC, Oslo
- Mixed doubles partner: Bettina Nordbye

Curling career
- Member Association: Norway
- World Championship: 1 (1998)
- European Championship: 3 (1997, 2000, 2002)
- Other appearances: World Junior Championships: 2 (1991, 1992), World Senior Curling Championships: 1 (2024)
Medal record
Curling
European Championships
| Bronze medal – third place | 2002 Grindelwald |
Norwegian Men's Championship
| Gold medal – first place | 1998 |
| Gold medal – first place | 2000 |
| Gold medal – first place | 2003 |
| Gold medal – first place | 2004 |
| Bronze medal – third place | 2013 |

Johan Høstmælingen (born November 16, 1971, in Lillehammer) is a Norwegian curler.

At the national level, he is a four-time Norwegian men's champion curler (1998, 2000, 2003, 2004).

== Teams ==
| Season | Skip | Third | Second | Lead | Alternate | Coach | Events |
|---|---|---|---|---|---|---|---|
| 1990–91 | Thomas Due | Torger Nergård | Mads Rygg | Johan Høstmælingen | Krister Aanesen | | WJCC 1991 (8th) |
| 1991–92 | Thomas Due | Torger Nergård | Mads Rygg | Johan Høstmælingen | Thomas Ulsrud | | WJCC 1992 (8th) |
| 1997–98 | Thomas Ulsrud | Johan Høstmælingen | Thomas Due | Torger Nergård | Rolf Andreas Lauten | | ECC 1997 (7th) |
| 1997–98 | Thomas Ulsrud | Thomas Due | Torger Nergård | Johan Høstmælingen | Rolf Andreas Lauten | | NMCC 1998 (gold); WCC 1998 (5th) |
| 1999–00 | Thomas Ulsrud | Thomas Due | Torger Nergård | Johan Høstmælingen | | | NMCC 2000 (gold) |
| 2000–01 | Thomas Ulsrud | Torger Nergård | Thomas Due | Johan Høstmælingen | Flemming Davanger | Ole Ingvaldsen | ECC 2000 (5th) |
| 2002–03 | Thomas Ulsrud | Torger Nergård | Thomas Due | Johan Høstmælingen | Thomas Løvold (ECC) | Ole Ingvaldsen | ECC 2002 (bronze); NMCC 2003 (gold) |
| 2003–04 | Johan Høstmælingen | ? | ? | ? | | | NMCC 2004 (gold) |
| 2012–13 | Thomas Løvold | Petter Moe | Sander Rølvåg | Johan Høstmælingen | | | NMCC 2013 (bronze) |
| 2015–16 | Stein Erik Johansen | Eivind Sve | Lars Ove Madshus | Kenth-Stian Johansen | Johan Høstmælingen | | NMCC 2016 (12th) |
| 2016–17 | Johan Høstmælingen | Eivind Sve | Lars Ove Madshus | Kenth-Stian Johansen | Rune Leistad | | |
| 2016–17 | Rune Leistad (fourth) | Johan Høstmælingen (skip) | Lars Ove Madshus | Kenth-Stian Johansen | | | NMCC 2017 (14th) |
| 2017–18 | Rune Leistad (fourth) | Johan Høstmælingen (skip) | Elias Høstmælingen | Kenth-Stian Johansen | Eskil Vintervold | | NMCC 2018 (4th) |
| 2018–19 | Johan Høstmælingen | Grunde Morten Buraas | Kenth-Stian Johansen | Eskil Vintervold | | | NMCC 2019 (9th) |
| 2019–20 | Johan Høstmælingen | Eskil Vintervold | Elias Høstmælingen | Olav Flækøy | | | NMCC 2020 (9th) |
