= Thomas Løvold =

Norwegian curler and Olympic medalist

- Curler
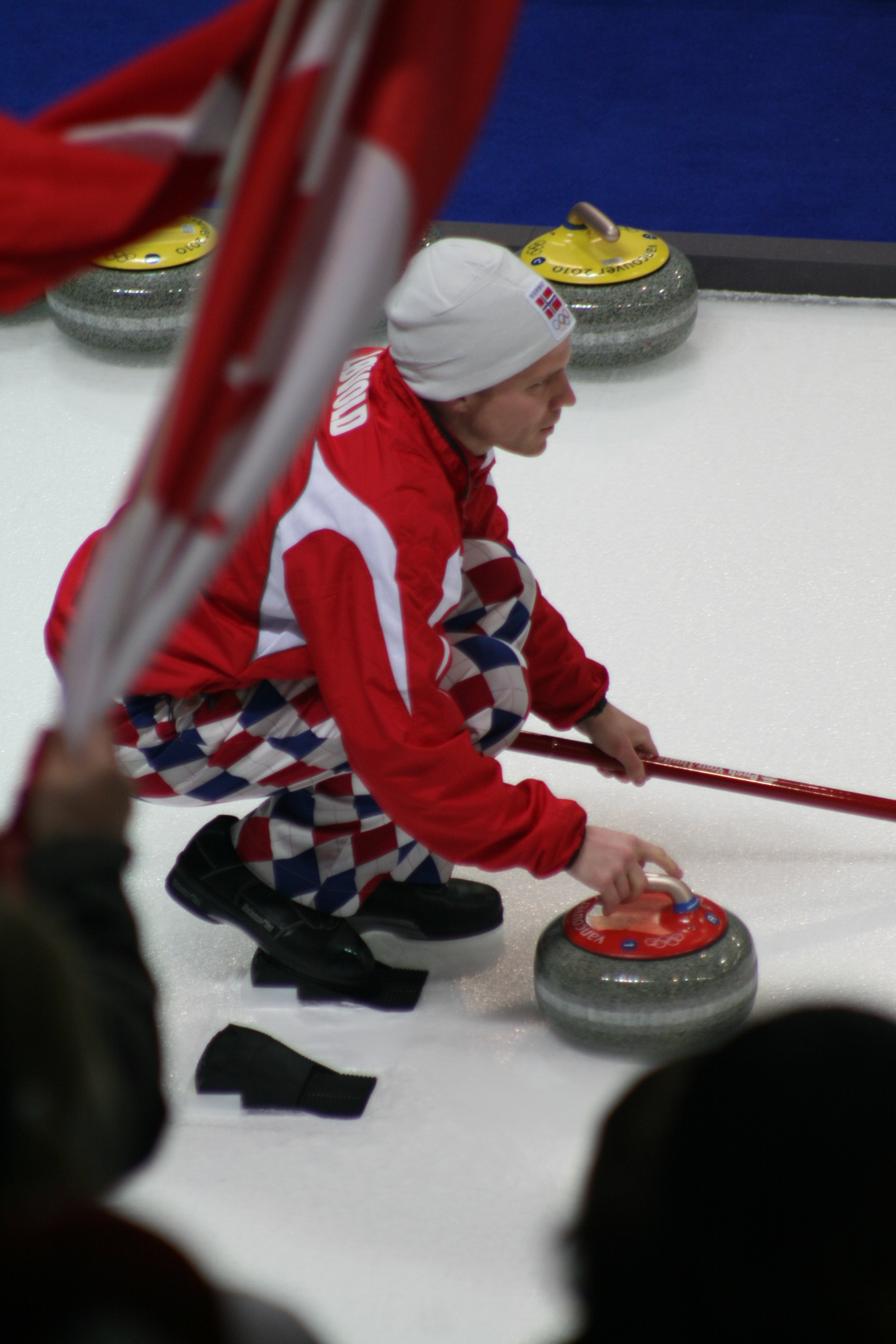
- Born: 27 January 1981 (age 45); Oslo, Norway

Team
- Curling club: Lillehammer CK, Lillehammer, Norway
- Skip: Thomas Løvold
- Third: Markus Høiberg
- Second: Magnus Nedregotten
- Lead: Alexander Lindström

Curling career
- World Championship: 5 (2007, 2009, 2010, 2012, 2013)
- European Championship: 6 (2002, 2003, 2009, 2011, 2012, 2026)
- Olympic: 1 (2010)
Medal record
Curling
Representing Norway
Winter Olympics
Silver medal – second place	2010 Vancouver
World Championships
Silver medal – second place	2010 Cortina d'Ampezzo
Bronze medal – third place	2009 Moncton
European Championships
Gold medal – first place	2011 Moscow
Silver medal – second place	2012 Karlstad
Bronze medal – third place	2009 Aberdeen
Universiade
Silver medal – second place	2009 Harbin

Thomas Løvold (born 27 January 1981) is a Norwegian curler. He won a silver at 2010 Winter Olympics as the alternate for the team skipped by Thomas Ulsrud.

At Junior level, Løvold competed as skip and won gold medals at the 2002 and 2003 World Junior Curling Championships "B" tournaments.

He has gained worldwide attention for having played as the alternate for Team Thomas Ulsrud at the 2010 Vancouver Winter Olympics and played third for Team Torger Nergård at the 2010 World Curling Championship in Cortina d'Ampezzo, Italy, winning the silver medal at both tournaments.

Thomas Løvold also skips his own team on World Curling Tour events. His most successful tournament was the 2009 Lucerne Curling Trophy where his team made it to the semi-finals but lost to Team Ralph Stöckli of Switzerland.

== Personal life ==
Løvold is married and has two children. He is employed as a coach. He lives in Oslo, Lillehammer and Hamar.

== Teams ==
Season	Skip	Third	Second	Lead	Alternate	Events
1998–99	Thomas Berntsen	Thomas Løvold	Jan Øivind Hewitt	Petter Moe	Christoffer Svae	1999 World Junior Curling Challenge (Gold), 1999 WJCC
2000–01	Thomas Løvold	Petter Moe	Fredrik Haaland	Christoffer Svae	Sindre Eirik Martinsen	2001 WJCCB
2001–02	Thomas Løvold	Petter Moe	Christoffer Svae	Håvard Vad Petersson	Christopher Berntsen	2002 WJCCB (Gold)
2001–02	Thomas Løvold	Petter Moe	Christoffer Svae	Fredrik Haaland	Christopher Berntsen	2002 WJCC
2002–03	Thomas Ulsrud	Torger Nergård	Thomas Due	Johan Høstmælingen	Thomas Løvold	2002 ECC (Bronze)
2002–03	Thomas Løvold	Petter Moe	Christoffer Svae	Håvard Vad Petersson	Bård Rieber-Mohn	2003 WJCCB (Gold), WJCC
2002–03	Øystein Sørum	Thomas Løvold	Petter Moe	Hallvard Sørum		2003 Universiade
2003–04	Thomas Ulsrud	Torger Nergård	Thomas Due	Jan Thoresen	Thomas Løvold	2003 ECC
2006–07	Thomas Ulsrud	Torger Nergård	Thomas Due	Jan Thoresen	Thomas Løvold	2007 WCC
2008–09	Thomas Løvold	Christoffer Svae	Hans Tømmervold	Anders Bjørgum		2009 Universiade (Silver)
2008–09	Thomas Ulsrud	Torger Nergård	Christoffer Svae	Håvard Vad Petersson	Thomas Løvold	2009 WCC (Bronze)
2009–10	Thomas Ulsrud	Torger Nergård	Christoffer Svae	Håvard Vad Petersson	Thomas Løvold	2009 ECC (Bronze); 2010 OG (Silver)
2009–10	Torger Nergård	Thomas Løvold	Christoffer Svae	Håvard Vad Petersson		2010 WCC (Silver)
2009–10	Thomas Løvold	Petter Moe	Hans Tømmervold	Joakim Skogvold		
2010–11	Thomas Løvold	Steffen Walstad	Markus Høiberg	Frode Tobias Bjerke		
2011–12	Thomas Løvold	Thomas Due	Steffen Walstad	Sander Rolvag		
2012–13	Thomas Løvold	Petter Moe	Sander Rolvag	Johan Høstmælingen		
