= Michael Mellemseter =

Norwegian curler

- Curler
- Born: 12 November 1998 (age 28); Trondheim, Norway

Team
- Curling club: Oppdal CK, Oppdal
- Skip: Andreas Hårstad
- Third: Willhelm Næss
- Second: Michael Mellemseter
- Lead: Mathias Brænden

Curling career
- Member Association: Norway
- World Championship: 2 (2019, 2026)
- Other appearances: World Junior Championships: 2 (2018, 2019), Youth Olympic Games: 1 (2016)
Medal record
Curling
Norwegian Men's Championship
Gold medal – first place	2019 Haugesund
Silver medal – second place	2024 Oslo
Silver medal – second place	2026 Lillehammer
Bronze medal – third place	2018 Lillehammer

Michael Mellemseter (born 12 November 1998 in Trondheim) is a Norwegian curler. He currently plays second on Team Andreas Hårstad.

== Personal life ==
He started curling in 2005 at the age of 7. As of 2019, he was a student.

== Teams ==
=== Men's ===
Season	Skip	Third	Second	Lead	Alternate	Coach	Events
2015–16	Kristian Foss	Michael Mellemseter	Einar Mesloe	Morten Hovdal			NMCC 2016 (7th)
2016–17	Kristian Foss	Michael Mellemseter	Andreas Hårstad	Morten Hovdal			NMCC 2017 (6th)
2017–18	Magnus Ramsfjell	Kristian Foss	Michael Mellemseter	Andreas Hårstad	Jörgen Myran	Stein Mellemseter	WJCC 2018 (6th); NMCC 2018 (bronze)
2018–19	Magnus Ramsfjell	Michael Mellemseter	Andreas Hårstad	Jørgen Myran			NMCC 2019 (gold)
2018–19	Magnus Ramsfjell	Michael Mellemseter	Jørgen Myran	Andreas Hårstad	Ingebrigt Bjørnstad (WJCC); Steffen Walstad (WCC)	Stein Mellemseter	WJCC 2019 (4th); WCC 2019 (12th)
2019–20	Ingebrigt Bjørnstad	Michael Mellemseter	Marcus Wolan	Andreas Hårstad			
2020–21	Ingebrigt Bjørnstad	Michael Mellemseter	Marcus Wolan	Andreas Hårstad			
2021–22	Mathias Brænden	Michael Mellemseter	Grunde Morten Buraas	Andreas Hårstad			
2022–23	Andreas Hårstad	Michael Mellemseter	Willhelm Næss	Emil M. Kvål			

=== Mixed ===
Season	Skip	Third	Second	Lead	Alternate	Coach	Events
2016	Michael Mellemseter (fourth)	Maia Ramsfjell (skip)	Andreas Hårstad	Eline Mjøen		Ingvild Skaga	WYOG 2016 (7th)
2016–17	Kristian Foss (fourth)	Astri Forbregd (skip)	Michael Mellemseter	Mari Forbregd	Elias Høstmælingen		NMxCC 2017 (4th)

=== Mixed doubles ===
Season	Female	Male	Events
2016	Martina Ghezze	Michael Mellemseter	WYOG 2016 (17th)
