= Rolf Andreas Lauten =

Norwegian curler

- Curler ♂

Team
- Curling club: Snarøyen CC, Oslo

Curling career
- Member Association: Norway
- World Championship: 1 (1998)
- European Championship: 1 (1997)
Medal record
Curling
Norwegian Men's Championship
Gold medal – first place	1998

Rolf Andreas Lauten is a Norwegian curler.

At the national level, he is a 1998 Norwegian men's champion curler.

== Teams ==
Season	Skip	Third	Second	Lead	Alternate	Events
1997–98	Thomas Ulsrud	Johan Høstmælingen	Thomas Due	Torger Nergård	Rolf Andreas Lauten	ECC 1997 (7th)
1997–98	Thomas Ulsrud	Thomas Due	Torger Nergård	Johan Høstmælingen	Rolf Andreas Lauten	NMCC 1998 (gold); WCC 1998 (5th)
