= 2018 World Junior Curling Championships =

- Host city: Aberdeen, Scotland
- Arena: Curl Aberdeen
- Dates: March 3–10
- Men's winner: Canada
- Skip: Tyler Tardi
- Third: Sterling Middleton
- Second: Jordan Tardi
- Lead: Zach Curtis
- Alternate: Jacques Gauthier
- Finalist: Scotland (Ross Whyte)
- Women's winner: Canada
- Skip: Kaitlyn Jones
- Third: Kristin Clarke
- Second: Karlee Burgess
- Lead: Lindsey Burgess
- Alternate: Lauren Lenentine
- Finalist: Sweden (Isabella Wranå)

The 2018 World Junior Curling Championships was held from March 3 to 10 at Curl Aberdeen in Aberdeen, Scotland.

== Men ==
=== Teams ===
Men's teams

Country	Skip	Third	Second	Lead	Alternate
Canada	Tyler Tardi	Sterling Middleton	Jordan Tardi	Zach Curtis	Jacques Gauthier
China	Wang Zhiyu	Tian Jiafeng	Wang Xiangkun	Zhang Zezhong	Guan Tianqi
Germany	Sixten Totzek (fourth)	Klaudius Harsch (skip)	Joshua Sutor	Jan-Luca Häg	Till Wunderlich
Norway	Magnus Ramsfjell	Kristian Foss	Michael Mellemseter	Andreas Hårstad	Jorgen Myran
Russia	Aleksandr Bystrov	Sergei Morozov	Vadim Shvedov	Konstanin Manasevich	Alexey Tuzov
Scotland	Ross Whyte	Robin Brydone	Fraser Kingan	Euan Kyle	Duncan McFadzean
South Korea	Hwang Hyeon-jun	Jeong Byeong-jin	Lee Dong-hyeong	Lee Jae-beom	Choi Da-wun
Sweden	Daniel Magnusson	Johan Nygren	Anton Regosa	Sebastian Jones	Filip Stener
Switzerland	Jan Hess	Simon Gloor	Simon Hoehn	Reto Schönenberger	Philipp Hösli
United States	Andrew Stopera	Luc Violette	Ben Richardson	Graem Fenson	Jonathon Harstad

=== Round-robin standings ===
Final Round Robin Standings

Key
Teams to Playoffs
Teams to relegated to "B" championships

Country	Skip	W	L
Scotland	Ross Whyte	9	0
Canada	Tyler Tardi	7	2
United States	Andrew Stopera	7	2
Switzerland	Jan Hess	5	4
Germany	Klaudius Harsch	4	5
Norway	Magnus Ramsfjell	4	5
Sweden	Daniel Magnusson	3	6
China	Wang Zhiyu	3	6
South Korea	Hwang Hyeon-jun	2	7
Russia	Aleksandr Bystrov	1	8

Team	Canada	China	Turkey	South Korea	Norway	Russia	Scotland	Switzerland	Sweden	United States	Record
Canada		5–7	4–2	10–3	8–7	7–5	5–6	7–3	7–3	4–2	7–2
China	7–5		7–8	8–7	2–9	7–4	1–6	4–7	3–7	1–7	3–6
Germany	2–4	8–7		4–10	9–5	3–2	2–7	3–9	8–7	7–9	4–5
South Korea	3–10	7–8	10–4		5–9	8–9	5–7	3–8	9–7	3–6	2–7
Norway	7–8	9–2	5–9	9–5		7–5	6–8	5–8	11–4	2–8	4–5
Russia	5–7	4–7	2–3	9–8	5–7		3–10	5–7	7–9	5–8	1–8
Scotland	6–5	6–1	7–2	7–5	8–6	10–3		10–5	7–3	6–5	9–0
Switzerland	3–7	7–4	9–3	8–3	8–5	7–5	5–10		5–9	3–8	5–4
Sweden	3–7	7–3	7–8	7–9	4–11	9–7	3–7	9–5		5–7	3–6
United States	2–4	7–1	9–7	6–3	8–2	8–5	5–6	8–3	7–5		7–2

=== Round-robin results ===
==== Draw 1 ====
Saturday, March 3, 14:00

Sheet A	1	2	3	4	5	6	7	8	9	10	Final
Sweden (Magnusson) 🔨	0	2	1	1	0	0	1	0	2	X	7
China (Wang)	0	0	0	0	1	0	0	2	0	X	3

Sheet B	1	2	3	4	5	6	7	8	9	10	Final
Germany (Harsch)	0	1	2	0	0	0	1	0	X	X	4
South Korea (Hwang) 🔨	1	0	0	3	3	1	0	2	X	X	10

Sheet C	1	2	3	4	5	6	7	8	9	10	Final
Scotland (Whyte) 🔨	0	1	0	2	0	3	0	1	1	0	8
Norway (Ramsfjell)	1	0	1	0	2	0	1	0	0	1	6

Sheet D	1	2	3	4	5	6	7	8	9	10	11	Final
Russia (Bystrov) 🔨	0	1	0	0	0	1	0	1	1	1	0	5
United States (Stopera)	0	0	1	0	2	0	2	0	0	0	3	8

Sheet E	1	2	3	4	5	6	7	8	9	10	Final
Canada (Tardi) 🔨	0	0	1	0	0	1	1	0	4	X	7
Switzerland (Hess)	0	0	0	0	2	0	0	1	0	X	3

==== Draw 2 ====
Sunday, March 4, 9:00

Sheet A	1	2	3	4	5	6	7	8	9	10	Final
South Korea (Hwang)	0	4	0	2	0	1	0	1	0	0	8
Russia (Bystrov) 🔨	1	0	2	0	1	0	2	0	2	1	9

Sheet B	1	2	3	4	5	6	7	8	9	10	Final
China (Wang) 🔨	0	0	0	0	0	1	0	0	X	X	1
United States (Stopera)	0	0	0	1	2	0	3	1	X	X	7

Sheet C	1	2	3	4	5	6	7	8	9	10	Final
Canada (Tardi)	0	1	2	1	1	0	1	0	1	X	7
Sweden (Magnusson) 🔨	0	0	0	0	0	1	0	2	0	X	3

Sheet D	1	2	3	4	5	6	7	8	9	10	Final
Switzerland (Hess)	0	1	0	1	0	3	0	0	2	1	8
Norway (Ramsfjell) 🔨	0	0	1	0	3	0	0	1	0	0	5

Sheet E	1	2	3	4	5	6	7	8	9	10	Final
Germany (Harsch)	0	0	1	0	0	0	0	1	0	X	2
Scotland (Whyte) 🔨	2	0	0	2	2	0	0	0	1	X	7

==== Draw 3 ====
Sunday, March 4, 19:00

Sheet A	1	2	3	4	5	6	7	8	9	10	Final
Norway (Ramsfjell) 🔨	1	0	0	0	2	0	1	1	0	0	5
Germany (Harsch)	0	1	2	1	0	2	0	0	1	2	9

Sheet B	1	2	3	4	5	6	7	8	9	10	Final
Sweden (Magnusson) 🔨	1	1	2	0	2	0	0	2	1	X	9
Switzerland (Hess)	0	0	0	3	0	1	1	0	0	X	5

Sheet C	1	2	3	4	5	6	7	8	9	10	Final
China (Wang) 🔨	0	3	0	1	1	1	0	1	0	X	7
Russia (Bystrov)	0	0	0	0	0	0	3	0	1	X	4

Sheet D	1	2	3	4	5	6	7	8	9	10	Final
Scotland (Whyte)	0	3	0	0	0	0	0	1	0	2	6
Canada (Tardi) 🔨	1	0	0	0	1	0	2	0	1	0	5

Sheet E	1	2	3	4	5	6	7	8	9	10	Final
South Korea (Hwang)	0	0	0	1	0	1	0	0	1	X	3
United States (Stopera) 🔨	2	1	0	0	1	0	0	2	0	X	6

==== Draw 4 ====
Monday, March 5, 14:00

Sheet A	1	2	3	4	5	6	7	8	9	10	Final
United States (Stopera)	0	0	0	0	1	1	0	0	0	X	2
Canada (Tardi) 🔨	0	2	0	0	0	0	2	0	0	X	4

Sheet B	1	2	3	4	5	6	7	8	9	10	Final
Scotland (Whyte) 🔨	2	0	5	2	0	0	1	X	X	X	10
Russia (Bystrov)	0	1	0	0	2	0	0	X	X	X	3

Sheet C	1	2	3	4	5	6	7	8	9	10	Final
Switzerland (Hess) 🔨	0	1	0	2	0	0	2	0	3	X	8
South Korea (Hwang)	0	0	1	0	1	0	0	1	0	X	3

Sheet D	1	2	3	4	5	6	7	8	9	10	Final
Norway (Ramsfjell) 🔨	2	0	3	2	2	0	0	2	X	X	11
Sweden (Magnusson)	0	1	0	0	0	2	1	0	X	X	4

Sheet E	1	2	3	4	5	6	7	8	9	10	Final
China (Wang) 🔨	0	2	0	0	0	2	0	2	1	0	7
Germany (Harsch)	0	0	0	0	3	0	4	0	0	1	8

==== Draw 5 ====
Tuesday, March 6, 9:00

Sheet A	1	2	3	4	5	6	7	8	9	10	Final
Scotland (Whyte) 🔨	1	1	1	1	0	0	1	0	0	2	7
South Korea (Hwang)	0	0	0	0	2	1	0	2	0	0	5

Sheet B	1	2	3	4	5	6	7	8	9	10	Final
Canada (Tardi)	0	1	0	0	0	3	0	0	1	0	5
China (Wang) 🔨	2	0	0	0	1	0	2	1	0	1	7

Sheet C	1	2	3	4	5	6	7	8	9	10	Final
Sweden (Magnusson)	0	1	0	2	0	0	0	0	2	X	5
United States (Stopera) 🔨	3	0	2	0	0	0	2	0	0	X	7

Sheet D	1	2	3	4	5	6	7	8	9	10	Final
Germany (Harsch)	0	0	0	0	1	0	2	0	X	X	3
Switzerland (Hess) 🔨	0	1	1	2	0	2	0	3	X	X	9

Sheet E	1	2	3	4	5	6	7	8	9	10	Final
Russia (Bystrov) 🔨	1	0	1	0	2	0	0	1	0	X	5
Norway (Ramsfjell)	0	2	0	2	0	0	0	0	3	X	7

==== Draw 6 ====
Tuesday, March 6, 19:00

Sheet A	1	2	3	4	5	6	7	8	9	10	11	Final
Canada (Tardi)	0	0	3	0	0	0	3	0	1	0	1	8
Norway (Ramsfjell) 🔨	1	0	0	1	1	1	0	1	0	2	0	7

Sheet B	1	2	3	4	5	6	7	8	9	10	Final
South Korea (Hwang)	0	3	0	2	0	2	0	2	0	X	9
Sweden (Magnusson) 🔨	1	0	3	0	1	0	0	0	2	X	7

Sheet C	1	2	3	4	5	6	7	8	9	10	Final
Russia (Bystrov) 🔨	0	0	0	1	0	0	0	1	0	0	2
Germany (Harsch)	0	0	0	0	0	1	0	0	1	1	3

Sheet D	1	2	3	4	5	6	7	8	9	10	11	Final
United States (Stopera) 🔨	0	0	1	1	0	2	0	0	0	1	0	5
Scotland (Whyte)	0	1	0	0	2	0	1	0	1	0	1	6

Sheet E	1	2	3	4	5	6	7	8	9	10	Final
Switzerland (Hess) 🔨	0	1	3	1	0	2	0	0	0	X	7
China (Wang)	0	0	0	0	1	0	2	1	0	X	4

==== Draw 7 ====
Wednesday, March 7, 14:00

Sheet A	1	2	3	4	5	6	7	8	9	10	Final
Germany (Harsch)	2	1	0	0	1	0	1	0	2	0	7
United States (Stopera) 🔨	0	0	3	1	0	2	0	1	0	2	9

Sheet B	1	2	3	4	5	6	7	8	9	10	Final
Switzerland (Hess) 🔨	1	0	2	1	0	0	1	0	X	X	5
Scotland (Whyte)	0	4	0	0	2	0	0	4	X	X	10

Sheet C	1	2	3	4	5	6	7	8	9	10	Final
Norway (Ramsfjell) 🔨	1	0	2	4	0	2	X	X	X	X	9
China (Wang)	0	1	0	0	1	0	X	X	X	X	2

Sheet D	1	2	3	4	5	6	7	8	9	10	Final
Canada (Tardi) 🔨	6	0	2	0	0	2	X	X	X	X	10
South Korea (Hwang)	0	1	0	2	0	0	X	X	X	X	3

Sheet E	1	2	3	4	5	6	7	8	9	10	Final
Sweden (Magnusson) 🔨	0	1	0	0	2	0	3	0	2	1	9
Russia (Bystrov)	0	0	2	2	0	1	0	2	0	0	7

==== Draw 8 ====
Thursday, March 8, 9:00

Sheet A	1	2	3	4	5	6	7	8	9	10	Final
China (Wang)	0	0	0	0	0	0	1	X	X	X	1
Scotland (Whyte) 🔨	0	2	1	1	0	2	0	X	X	X	6

Sheet B	1	2	3	4	5	6	7	8	9	10	Final
Russia (Bystrov) 🔨	1	0	1	0	1	0	0	2	0	0	5
Canada (Tardi)	0	2	0	1	0	1	0	0	2	1	7

Sheet C	1	2	3	4	5	6	7	8	9	10	Final
United States (Stopera) 🔨	0	4	0	0	2	0	1	1	X	X	8
Switzerland (Hess)	0	0	1	0	0	2	0	0	X	X	3

Sheet D	1	2	3	4	5	6	7	8	9	10	11	Final
Sweden (Magnusson) 🔨	0	0	1	1	0	2	0	2	0	1	0	7
Germany (Harsch)	0	2	0	0	3	0	1	0	1	0	1	8

Sheet E	1	2	3	4	5	6	7	8	9	10	Final
Norway (Ramsfjell) 🔨	2	0	0	1	0	3	3	0	X	X	9
South Korea (Hwang)	0	1	0	0	2	0	0	2	X	X	5

==== Draw 9 ====
Thursday, March 8, 19:00

Sheet A	1	2	3	4	5	6	7	8	9	10	Final
Russia (Bystrov)	0	2	0	1	0	0	2	0	0	X	5
Switzerland (Hess) 🔨	3	0	1	0	1	0	0	0	2	X	7

Sheet B	1	2	3	4	5	6	7	8	9	10	Final
United States (Stopera) 🔨	1	0	0	2	0	0	1	4	X	X	8
Norway (Ramsfjell)	0	0	1	0	1	0	0	0	X	X	2

Sheet C	1	2	3	4	5	6	7	8	9	10	Final
Germany (Harsch) 🔨	0	1	0	0	0	0	0	0	1	0	2
Canada (Tardi)	1	0	0	0	0	2	0	0	0	1	4

Sheet D	1	2	3	4	5	6	7	8	9	10	Final
South Korea (Hwang)	0	1	0	1	0	2	2	0	1	0	7
China (Wang) 🔨	3	0	2	0	1	0	0	1	0	1	8

Sheet E	1	2	3	4	5	6	7	8	9	10	Final
Scotland (Whyte) 🔨	0	1	0	0	3	0	2	1	0	X	7
Sweden (Magnusson)	0	0	1	0	0	1	0	0	1	X	3

=== Playoffs ===
Semifinal
1	Scotland	5
4	Switzerland	4
2	Canada	8
3	United States	5

Final
1	Scotland	5
2	Canada	6

Bronze-medal game
4	Switzerland	7
3	United States	4

==== Semifinal ====
Friday, March 9, 19:00

Team	1	2	3	4	5	6	7	8	9	10	Final
Scotland (Whyte) 🔨	0	3	0	0	0	0	0	1	0	1	5
Switzerland (Hess)	0	0	0	0	1	1	0	0	2	0	4

Team	1	2	3	4	5	6	7	8	9	10	Final
Canada (Tardi) 🔨	0	0	3	0	2	1	0	0	2	X	8
United States (Stopera)	0	0	0	2	0	0	1	2	0	X	5

==== Bronze-medal game ====
Saturday, March 10, 14:00

Team	1	2	3	4	5	6	7	8	9	10	Final
Switzerland (Hess)	0	0	0	2	0	1	0	3	1	X	7
United States (Stopera) 🔨	0	0	1	0	1	0	2	0	0	X	4

==== Final ====
Saturday, March 10, 14:00

Team	1	2	3	4	5	6	7	8	9	10	11	Final
Scotland (Whyte) 🔨	0	1	0	1	0	0	0	0	2	1	0	5
Canada (Tardi)	0	0	1	0	0	3	1	0	0	0	1	6

== Women ==
=== Teams ===
Women's teams

Country	Skip	Third	Second	Lead	Alternate
Canada	Kaitlyn Jones	Kristin Clarke	Karlee Burgess	Lindsey Burgess	Lauren Lenentine
China	Dong Ziqi (fourth)	Wang Zixin (skip)	Wang Meini	Sun Chengyu	Yu Jiaxin
Norway	Maia Ramsfjell	Martine Rønning	Mille Haslev Nordbye	Eirin Mesloe	Victoria Johansen
Russia	Vlada Rumiantseva	Vera Tiuliakova	Irina Riazanova	Anastasiia Danshina	Daria Patrikeeva
Scotland	Rebecca Morrison	Amy MacDonald	Hailey Duff	Leeanne McKenzie	Sophie Jackson
South Korea	Kim Min-ji	Kim Hye-rin	Yang Tae-i	Kim Su-jin	Kang Chae-lin
Sweden	Isabella Wranå	Jennie Wåhlin	Almida de Val	Fanny Sjöberg	Maria Larsson
Switzerland	Selina Witschonke	Elena Mathis	Melina Bezzola	Anna Gut	Laura Engler
Turkey	Dilşat Yıldız	Berivan Polat	Mihriban Polat	Zeynep Oztemir	Canan Temuren
United States	Madison Bear	Annmarie Dubberstein	Jenna Burchesky	Allison Howell	Leah Yavarow

=== Round-robin standings ===
Final round robin standings

Key
Teams to Playoffs
Teams to relegated to "B" championships

Country	Skip	W	L
Sweden	Isabella Wranå	9	0
Canada	Kaitlyn Jones	7	2
China	Wang Zixin	5	4
Norway	Maia Ramsfjell	5	4
United States	Madison Bear	4	5
South Korea	Kim Min-ji	4	5
Switzerland	Selina Witschonke	4	5
Russia	Vlada Rumiantseva	3	6
Scotland	Rebecca Morrison	3	6
Turkey	Dilşat Yıldız	1	8

Team	Canada	China	South Korea	Norway	Russia	Scotland	Switzerland	Sweden	Turkey	United States	Record
Canada		8–5	7–4	8–6	9–6	4–8	10–7	6–8	8–5	8–3	7–2
China	5–8		7–1	5–3	10–5	3–4	7–8	1–8	8–6	9–6	5–4
South Korea	4–7	1–7		8–6	7–5	8–5	9–5	4–7	3–5	6–8	4–5
Norway	6–8	3–5	6–8		8–7	7–6	7–6	5–8	10–5	7–3	5–4
Russia	6–9	5–10	5–7	7–8		7–6	3–8	6–8	9–2	7–6	3–6
Scotland	8–4	4–3	5–8	6–7	6–7		6–9	4–10	7–4	4–11	3–6
Switzerland	7–10	8–7	5–9	6–7	8–3	9–6		6–7	6–4	6–7	4–5
Sweden	8–6	8–1	7–4	8–5	8–6	10–4	7–6		7–3	9–3	9–0
Turkey	5–8	6–8	5–3	5–10	2–9	4–7	4–6	3–7		5–6	1–8
United States	3–8	6–9	8–6	3–7	6–7	11–4	7–6	3–9	6–5		4–5

=== Round-robin results ===
==== Draw 1 ====
Saturday, March 3, 9:00

Sheet A	1	2	3	4	5	6	7	8	9	10	Final
United States (Bear)	0	1	0	1	0	0	1	2	1	1	7
Switzerland (Witschonke) 🔨	2	0	2	0	0	2	0	0	0	0	6

Sheet B	1	2	3	4	5	6	7	8	9	10	Final
Scotland (Morrison)	1	0	0	0	2	1	0	0	2	0	6
Norway (Ramsfjell) 🔨	0	1	0	0	0	0	2	2	0	2	7

Sheet C	1	2	3	4	5	6	7	8	9	10	Final
China (Wang)	1	0	0	0	1	0	1	2	0	0	5
Canada (Jones) 🔨	0	2	1	1	0	2	0	0	0	2	8

Sheet D	1	2	3	4	5	6	7	8	9	10	Final
South Korea (Kim)	0	1	0	0	1	0	0	2	0	X	4
Sweden (Wranå) 🔨	0	0	2	1	0	3	0	0	1	X	7

Sheet E	1	2	3	4	5	6	7	8	9	10	Final
Russia (Rumiantseva) 🔨	2	0	0	2	1	1	0	3	X	X	9
Turkey (Yıldız)	0	0	1	0	0	0	1	0	X	X	2

==== Draw 2 ====
Saturday, March 3, 19:00

Sheet A	1	2	3	4	5	6	7	8	9	10	Final
Norway (Ramsfjell)	0	0	1	2	1	1	0	0	1	0	6
South Korea (Kim) 🔨	1	1	0	0	0	0	3	2	0	1	8

Sheet B	1	2	3	4	5	6	7	8	9	10	11	Final
Switzerland (Witschonke) 🔨	0	1	0	0	1	0	1	0	2	1	0	6
Sweden (Wranå)	0	0	0	3	0	2	0	1	0	0	1	7

Sheet C	1	2	3	4	5	6	7	8	9	10	Final
Russia (Rumiantseva) 🔨	0	2	0	2	0	2	0	0	0	1	7
United States (Bear)	2	0	1	0	2	0	1	0	0	0	6

Sheet D	1	2	3	4	5	6	7	8	9	10	Final
Turkey (Yıldız) 🔨	0	0	0	3	0	1	0	1	0	0	5
Canada (Jones)	1	0	0	0	2	0	2	0	1	2	8

Sheet E	1	2	3	4	5	6	7	8	9	10	11	Final
Scotland (Morrison) 🔨	0	1	0	0	0	1	0	0	0	1	1	4
China (Wang)	0	0	0	1	0	0	0	2	0	0	0	3

==== Draw 3 ====
Sunday, March 4, 14:00

Sheet A	1	2	3	4	5	6	7	8	9	10	Final
Canada (Jones)	0	0	0	1	0	1	1	1	0	X	4
Scotland (Morrison) 🔨	2	2	2	0	1	0	0	0	1	X	8

Sheet B	1	2	3	4	5	6	7	8	9	10	Final
United States (Bear) 🔨	1	1	0	1	0	1	0	1	0	1	6
Turkey (Yıldız)	0	0	2	0	1	0	0	0	2	0	5

Sheet C	1	2	3	4	5	6	7	8	9	10	Final
Switzerland (Witschonke)	0	0	2	0	0	3	0	0	0	X	5
South Korea (Kim) 🔨	1	3	0	3	1	0	0	0	1	X	9

Sheet D	1	2	3	4	5	6	7	8	9	10	Final
China (Wang)	0	2	0	2	0	3	0	0	3	X	10
Russia (Rumiantseva) 🔨	0	0	2	0	2	0	1	0	0	X	5

Sheet E	1	2	3	4	5	6	7	8	9	10	Final
Norway (Ramsfjell) 🔨	1	1	0	1	0	1	0	1	0	X	5
Sweden (Wranå)	0	0	1	0	1	0	3	0	3	X	8

==== Draw 4 ====
Monday, March 5, 9:00

Sheet A	1	2	3	4	5	6	7	8	9	10	Final
Sweden (Wranå)	0	1	1	0	3	0	1	0	2	X	8
Russia (Rumiantseva) 🔨	1	0	0	2	0	0	0	3	0	X	6

Sheet B	1	2	3	4	5	6	7	8	9	10	Final
China (Wang)	1	0	1	2	1	0	0	1	1	X	7
South Korea (Kim) 🔨	0	0	0	0	0	0	1	0	0	X	1

Sheet C	1	2	3	4	5	6	7	8	9	10	Final
Turkey (Yıldız) 🔨	2	1	1	1	0	0	0	0	0	X	5
Norway (Ramsfjell)	0	0	0	0	1	1	5	2	1	X	10

Sheet D	1	2	3	4	5	6	7	8	9	10	Final
Canada (Jones) 🔨	0	2	0	1	1	0	2	1	1	X	8
United States (Bear)	1	0	1	0	0	1	0	0	0	X	3

Sheet E	1	2	3	4	5	6	7	8	9	10	11	Final
Switzerland (Witschonke)	0	0	0	0	1	0	1	2	2	0	3	9
Scotland (Morrison) 🔨	0	1	0	3	0	1	0	0	0	1	0	6

==== Draw 5 ====
Monday, March 5, 19:00

Sheet A	1	2	3	4	5	6	7	8	9	10	Final
China (Wang)	1	0	1	0	1	1	0	1	0	X	5
Norway (Ramsfjell) 🔨	0	1	0	0	0	0	2	0	0	X	3

Sheet B	1	2	3	4	5	6	7	8	9	10	Final
Russia (Rumiantseva)	0	0	1	0	1	0	1	0	0	X	3
Switzerland (Witschonke) 🔨	0	1	0	3	0	0	0	2	2	X	8

Sheet C	1	2	3	4	5	6	7	8	9	10	Final
United States (Bear) 🔨	0	0	2	0	0	0	0	1	0	X	3
Sweden (Wranå)	1	1	0	3	0	0	1	0	3	X	9

Sheet D	1	2	3	4	5	6	7	8	9	10	Final
Scotland (Morrison) 🔨	1	0	0	2	1	0	3	0	0	X	7
Turkey (Yıldız)	0	0	1	0	0	1	0	1	1	X	4

Sheet E	1	2	3	4	5	6	7	8	9	10	Final
South Korea (Kim)	0	0	1	1	0	1	0	1	0	X	4
Canada (Jones) 🔨	2	1	0	0	2	0	1	0	1	X	7

==== Draw 6 ====
Tuesday, March 6, 14:00

Sheet A	1	2	3	4	5	6	7	8	9	10	Final
Russia (Rumiantseva) 🔨	2	1	0	0	3	0	0	0	0	X	6
Canada (Jones)	0	0	2	1	0	3	1	2	0	X	9

Sheet B	1	2	3	4	5	6	7	8	9	10	Final
Norway (Ramsfjell)	0	1	0	0	0	2	1	1	2	X	7
United States (Bear) 🔨	0	0	0	2	1	0	0	0	0	X	3

Sheet C	1	2	3	4	5	6	7	8	9	10	Final
South Korea (Kim)	0	0	1	3	0	2	0	2	0	X	8
Scotland (Morrison) 🔨	0	0	0	0	1	0	2	0	2	X	5

Sheet D	1	2	3	4	5	6	7	8	9	10	Final
Sweden (Wranå) 🔨	0	0	0	2	3	0	1	2	X	X	8
China (Wang)	0	0	0	0	0	1	0	0	X	X	1

Sheet E	1	2	3	4	5	6	7	8	9	10	Final
Turkey (Yıldız) 🔨	0	3	0	0	1	0	0	0	0	X	4
Switzerland (Witschonke)	1	0	2	0	0	2	1	0	0	X	6

==== Draw 7 ====
Wednesday, March 7, 9:00

Sheet A	1	2	3	4	5	6	7	8	9	10	Final
Scotland (Morrison)	0	2	1	0	0	0	0	1	0	X	4
Sweden (Wranå) 🔨	1	0	0	1	1	2	3	0	2	X	10

Sheet B	1	2	3	4	5	6	7	8	9	10	Final
Turkey (Yıldız) 🔨	1	0	3	1	0	1	0	0	0	X	6
China (Wang)	0	2	0	0	2	0	1	2	1	X	8

Sheet C	1	2	3	4	5	6	7	8	9	10	Final
Canada (Jones) 🔨	3	0	0	2	0	0	4	0	1	X	10
Switzerland (Witschonke)	0	2	1	0	2	0	0	2	0	X	7

Sheet D	1	2	3	4	5	6	7	8	9	10	11	Final
Russia (Rumiantseva)	0	1	2	0	2	0	0	1	0	1	0	7
Norway (Ramsfjell) 🔨	1	0	0	1	0	1	3	0	1	0	1	8

Sheet E	1	2	3	4	5	6	7	8	9	10	Final
United States (Bear)	0	1	0	0	1	1	0	4	0	1	8
South Korea (Kim) 🔨	1	0	2	0	0	0	1	0	2	0	6

==== Draw 8 ====
Wednesday, March 7, 19:00

Sheet A	1	2	3	4	5	6	7	8	9	10	Final
Switzerland (Witschonke) 🔨	0	0	2	0	0	2	0	2	0	2	8
China (Wang)	1	0	0	2	1	0	2	0	1	0	7

Sheet B	1	2	3	4	5	6	7	8	9	10	Final
South Korea (Kim)	0	0	2	0	1	0	2	2	0	X	7
Russia (Rumiantseva) 🔨	1	0	0	1	0	2	0	0	1	X	5

Sheet C	1	2	3	4	5	6	7	8	9	10	Final
Sweden (Wranå) 🔨	0	2	2	0	1	0	0	2	0	X	7
Turkey (Yıldız)	1	0	0	0	0	0	1	0	1	X	3

Sheet D	1	2	3	4	5	6	7	8	9	10	Final
United States (Bear) 🔨	2	0	3	1	0	3	0	2	X	X	11
Scotland (Morrison)	0	1	0	0	1	0	2	0	X	X	4

Sheet E	1	2	3	4	5	6	7	8	9	10	Final
Canada (Jones) 🔨	1	0	1	0	3	2	0	1	0	X	8
Norway (Ramsfjell)	0	1	0	2	0	0	2	0	1	X	6

==== Draw 9 ====
Thursday, March 8, 14:00

Sheet A	1	2	3	4	5	6	7	8	9	10	Final
South Korea (Kim)	0	0	0	1	0	1	0	1	0	X	3
Turkey (Yıldız) 🔨	1	0	0	0	1	0	1	0	2	X	5

Sheet B	1	2	3	4	5	6	7	8	9	10	Final
Sweden (Wranå) 🔨	0	2	0	2	0	0	2	1	0	1	8
Canada (Jones)	0	0	3	0	1	0	0	0	2	0	6

Sheet C	1	2	3	4	5	6	7	8	9	10	Final
Scotland (Morrison)	1	0	2	0	0	2	0	1	0	0	6
Russia (Rumiantseva) 🔨	0	1	0	0	2	0	2	0	0	2	7

Sheet D	1	2	3	4	5	6	7	8	9	10	Final
Norway (Ramsfjell)	0	2	0	0	1	0	2	0	1	1	7
Switzerland (Witschonke) 🔨	2	0	0	1	0	2	0	1	0	0	6

Sheet E	1	2	3	4	5	6	7	8	9	10	Final
China (Wang) 🔨	0	0	3	1	0	2	0	3	0	X	9
United States (Bear)	3	0	0	0	1	0	1	0	1	X	6

=== Playoffs ===
Semifinal
1	Sweden	9
4	Norway	3
2	Canada	9
3	China	7

Final
1	Sweden	4
2	Canada	7

Bronze-medal game
4	Norway	5
3	China	11

==== Semifinal ====
Friday, March 9, 14:00

Team	1	2	3	4	5	6	7	8	9	10	Final
Sweden (Wranå) 🔨	0	2	0	3	1	0	2	1	X	X	9
Norway (Ramsfjell)	0	0	2	0	0	1	0	0	X	X	3

Team	1	2	3	4	5	6	7	8	9	10	Final
Canada (Jones) 🔨	2	0	3	0	0	2	0	1	0	1	9
China (Wang)	0	1	0	0	4	0	2	0	0	0	7

==== Bronze-medal game ====
Saturday, March 10, 09:00

Team	1	2	3	4	5	6	7	8	9	10	Final
Norway (Ramsfjell)	0	0	2	1	0	2	0	0	X	X	5
China (Wang) 🔨	0	2	0	0	4	0	1	4	X	X	11

==== Final ====
Saturday, March 10, 09:00

Team	1	2	3	4	5	6	7	8	9	10	Final
Sweden (Wranå) 🔨	0	1	0	1	0	1	0	0	1	X	4
Canada (Jones)	0	0	2	0	3	0	1	1	0	X	7
