= Andreas Hårstad =

Norwegian curler (born 1998)

- Curler
- Born: 11 November 1998 (age 28); Oppdal Municipality, Norway

Team
- Curling club: Oppdal CC, Oppdal
- Skip: Andreas Hårstad
- Third: Willhelm Næss
- Second: Michael Mellemseter
- Lead: Mathias Brænden
- Mixed doubles partner: Astri Forbregd

Curling career
- Member Association: Norway
- World Championship: 2 (2019, 2026)
- World Mixed Championship: 1 (2023)
- European Championship: 1 (2022)
- Other appearances: World Junior Championships: 2 (2018, 2019), Youth Olympic Games: 1 (2016)
Medal record
Men's curling
Norwegian Men's Championship
Gold medal – first place	2019 Haugesund
Silver medal – second place	2024 Oslo
Silver medal – second place	2026 Lillehammer
Bronze medal – third place	2018 Lillehammer
Youth Olympic Games
Bronze medal – third place	2016 Lillehammer (mixed doubles)

Andreas Slipersæter Hårstad (born 11 November 1998 in Oppdal Municipality) is a Norwegian curler. He currently skips his own team out of Oppdal.

At the national level, he is a 2019 Norwegian men's champion curler.

== Personal life ==
He started curling in 2008 at the age of 10. As of 2019, he works as a shop assistant. He attended Inland Norway University of Applied Sciences.

== Teams ==
=== Men's ===
Season	Skip	Third	Second	Lead	Alternate	Coach	Events
2015–16	Jörgen Myran	Andreas Hårstad	Emil M. Kvål	Stig Morten Myran			NMCC 2016 (6th)
2016–17	Kristian Foss	Michael Mellemseter	Andreas Hårstad	Morten Hovdal			NMCC 2017 (6th)
2017–18	Magnus Ramsfjell	Kristian Foss	Michael Mellemseter	Andreas Hårstad	Jörgen Myran	Stein Mellemseter	WJCC 2018 (6th); NMCC 2018 (bronze)
2018–19	Magnus Ramsfjell	Michael Mellemseter	Andreas Hårstad	Jörgen Myran			NMCC 2019 (gold)
2018–19	Magnus Ramsfjell	Michael Mellemseter	Jörgen Myran	Andreas Hårstad	Ingebrigt Bjørnstad (WJCC); Steffen Walstad (WCC)	Stein Mellemseter	WJCC 2019 (4th); WCC 2019 (12th)
2019–20	Ingebrigt Bjørnstad	Michael Mellemseter	Marcus Wolan	Andreas Hårstad			
2020–21	Ingebrigt Bjørnstad	Michael Mellemseter	Marcus Wolan	Andreas Hårstad			
2021–22	Mathias Brænden	Michael Mellemseter	Grunde Morten Buraas	Andreas Hårstad			
2022–23	Andreas Hårstad	Michael Mellemseter	Willhelm Næss	Emil M. Kvål			

=== Mixed ===
Season	Skip	Third	Second	Lead	Coach	Events
2015–16	Michael Mellemseter (fourth)	Maia Ramsfjell (skip)	Andreas Hårstad	Eline Mjøen	Ingvild Skaga	WYOG 2016 (7th)
2016–17	Jørgen Myran	Malin Granli-Øiamo	Andreas Hårstad	Sara Holmen		NMxCC 2017 (5th)

=== Mixed doubles ===
Season	Female	Male	Events
2015–16	Zhao Ruiyi	Andreas Hårstad	WYOG 2016 (bronze)
2018–19	Nina Aune	Andreas Hårstad	NMDCC 2019 (9th)
