= 2013 World Junior Curling Championships =

- Host city: Sochi, Russia
- Arena: Ice Cube Curling Center
- Dates: February 28 – March 10
- Men's winner: Scotland
- Skip: Kyle Smith
- Third: Thomas Muirhead
- Second: Kyle Waddell
- Lead: Cammy Smith
- Alternate: Hammy McMillan Jr.
- Finalist: Russia (Evgeny Arkhipov)
- Women's winner: Russia
- Skip: Alina Kovaleva
- Fourth: Yulia Portunova
- Second: Alexandra Saitova
- Lead: Oxana Gertova
- Alternate: Olesia Gluschenko
- Finalist: Scotland (Hannah Fleming)

The 2013 World Junior Curling Championships were held from February 28 to March 10 at the Ice Cube Curling Center in Sochi, Russia. Sochi is also scheduled to host the curling tournament at the 2014 Winter Olympics.

== Men ==
=== Teams ===
The teams are listed as follows:

Country	Skip	Third	Second	Lead	Alternate
Canada	Matt Dunstone	Colton Lott	Daniel Grant	Brendan MacCuish	Josh Barry
China	Zhang Zhongbao	Jiang Dongxu	Xu Jingtao	Wang Jinbo	Zhang Rongrui
Czech Republic	Marek Černovský	Kryštof Krupanský	Jan Zelingr	Jakub Splavec	Štěpán Hron
Italy	Amos Mosaner	Andrea Pilzer	Daniele Ferrazza	Roberto Arman	Sebastiano Arman
Norway	Eirik Mjøen	Markus Skogvold	Martin Sesaker	Wilhelm Naess	Gaute Nepstad
Russia	Evgeny Arkhipov	Sergey Glukhov	Timur Gadzhikhanov	Artur Ali	Dmitry Mironov
Scotland	Kyle Smith	Thomas Muirhead	Kyle Waddell	Cammy Smith	Hammy McMillan Jr.
Sweden	Patric Mabergs	Gustav Eskilsson	Jesper Johansson	Johannes Patz	Fredrik Nyman
Switzerland	André Neuenschwander	Tobias Güntensperger	Sergio Gobbi	Kevin Keller	Patrick Poli
United States	Korey Dropkin	Thomas Howell	Mark Fenner	Alex Fenson	Connor Hoge

=== Round-robin standings ===
Final Round Robin Standings

Key
Teams to Playoffs

Country	Skip	W	L
Scotland	Kyle Smith	8	1
Canada	Matt Dunstone	7	2
Russia	Evgeny Arkhipov	7	2
Sweden	Gustav Eskilsson	6	3
Norway	Eirik Mjøen	5	4
Italy	Amos Mosaner	5	4
United States	Korey Dropkin	4	5
Switzerland	André Neuenschwander	2	7
China	Zhang Zhongbao	1	8
Czech Republic	Marek Černovský	0	9

=== Round-robin results ===
All draw times are listed in Moscow Time (UTC+4).

==== Draw 1 ====
Thursday, February 28, 9:00

Sheet A	1	2	3	4	5	6	7	8	9	10	Final
Russia (Arkhipov)	0	2	0	0	0	0	1	0	0	0	3
Italy (Mosaner) 🔨	1	0	0	0	2	0	0	1	1	1	6

Sheet B	1	2	3	4	5	6	7	8	9	10	11	Final
United States (Dropkin) 🔨	1	1	0	1	2	0	0	1	0	2	1	9
Czech Republic (Černovský)	0	0	2	0	0	3	0	0	3	0	0	8

Sheet C	1	2	3	4	5	6	7	8	9	10	Final
Canada (Dunstone) 🔨	0	0	0	1	0	4	0	1	0	3	9
Switzerland (Neuenschwander)	0	0	1	0	1	0	2	0	2	0	6

Sheet D	1	2	3	4	5	6	7	8	9	10	Final
Norway (Mjøen)	0	1	1	0	1	1	0	1	1	2	8
Sweden (Eskilsson) 🔨	1	0	0	3	0	0	1	0	0	0	5

==== Draw 2 ====
Thursday, February 28, 19:30

Sheet A	1	2	3	4	5	6	7	8	9	10	Final
Scotland (Smith)	0	0	1	0	0	0	1	1	3	1	7
China (Zhang) 🔨	0	2	0	2	1	1	0	0	0	0	6

Sheet B	1	2	3	4	5	6	7	8	9	10	Final
Canada (Dunstone)	0	2	1	0	0	0	1	0	0	1	5
Russia (Arkhipov) 🔨	1	0	0	0	1	0	0	1	1	0	4

Sheet C	1	2	3	4	5	6	7	8	9	10	Final
Sweden (Eskilsson)	0	2	1	1	2	0	3	1	X	X	10
United States (Dropkin) 🔨	3	0	0	0	0	1	0	0	X	X	4

Sheet D	1	2	3	4	5	6	7	8	9	10	Final
Czech Republic (Černovský)	0	0	0	0	1	0	0	1	0	X	2
Italy (Mosaner) 🔨	0	0	0	0	0	3	1	0	1	X	5

==== Draw 3 ====
Friday, March 1, 14:00

Sheet A	1	2	3	4	5	6	7	8	9	10	Final
Sweden (Eskilsson) 🔨	2	0	0	2	1	1	0	1	4	X	11
Czech Republic (Černovský)	0	1	1	0	0	0	2	0	0	X	4

Sheet B	1	2	3	4	5	6	7	8	9	10	Final
Scotland (Smith) 🔨	2	0	0	2	1	0	4	X	X	X	9
Switzerland (Neuenschwander)	0	0	1	0	0	2	0	X	X	X	3

Sheet C	1	2	3	4	5	6	7	8	9	10	11	Final
Italy (Mosaner)	0	0	2	0	0	0	0	1	0	2	0	5
Norway (Mjøen) 🔨	1	0	0	0	2	0	1	0	1	0	1	6

Sheet D	1	2	3	4	5	6	7	8	9	10	Final
China (Zhang)	0	0	1	0	1	0	0	2	0	X	4
Russia (Arkhipov) 🔨	2	1	0	3	0	0	2	0	1	X	9

==== Draw 4 ====
Saturday, March 2, 9:00

Sheet A	1	2	3	4	5	6	7	8	9	10	11	Final
Canada (Dunstone) 🔨	0	3	0	1	1	0	0	0	1	0	0	6
Scotland (Smith)	0	0	2	0	0	1	0	1	0	2	1	7

Sheet B	1	2	3	4	5	6	7	8	9	10	Final
China (Zhang)	0	1	0	0	1	0	0	1	0	0	3
Norway (Mjøen) 🔨	0	0	0	3	0	1	0	0	0	1	5

Sheet D	1	2	3	4	5	6	7	8	9	10	Final
Switzerland (Neuenschwander) 🔨	1	0	1	0	0	1	0	0	0	X	3
United States (Dropkin)	0	1	0	2	0	0	3	0	0	X	6

==== Draw 5 ====
Saturday, March 2, 19:00

Sheet A	1	2	3	4	5	6	7	8	9	10	Final
Norway (Mjøen)	0	1	3	0	0	0	0	0	1	2	7
Switzerland (Neuenschwander) 🔨	3	0	0	0	0	2	0	1	0	0	6

Sheet B	1	2	3	4	5	6	7	8	9	10	Final
United States (Dropkin) 🔨	2	1	0	0	1	0	0	1	0	0	5
Italy (Mosaner)	0	0	1	1	0	1	0	0	2	1	6

Sheet C	1	2	3	4	5	6	7	8	9	10	Final
Russia (Arkhipov)	0	0	0	0	1	1	2	0	1	X	5
Sweden (Eskilsson) 🔨	2	0	0	0	0	0	0	1	0	X	3

Sheet D	1	2	3	4	5	6	7	8	9	10	Final
Canada (Dunstone) 🔨	0	2	0	1	0	0	2	0	0	X	5
Czech Republic (Černovský)	0	0	1	0	1	0	0	0	1	X	3

==== Draw 6 ====
Sunday, March 3, 14:00

Sheet A	1	2	3	4	5	6	7	8	9	10	Final
United States (Dropkin)	0	1	0	0	2	0	0	X	X	X	3
Russia (Arkhipov) 🔨	2	0	0	3	0	1	3	X	X	X	9

Sheet B	1	2	3	4	5	6	7	8	9	10	Final
Sweden (Eskilsson) 🔨	2	0	0	2	0	1	0	0	0	1	6
Canada (Dunstone)	0	0	1	0	1	0	0	0	2	0	4

Sheet C	1	2	3	4	5	6	7	8	9	10	Final
China (Zhang)	1	1	0	1	1	2	0	0	4	X	10
Czech Republic (Černovský) 🔨	0	0	1	0	0	0	2	2	0	X	5

Sheet D	1	2	3	4	5	6	7	8	9	10	Final
Italy (Mosaner)	0	0	1	1	0	0	1	0	2	0	5
Scotland (Smith) 🔨	0	3	0	0	1	0	0	2	0	1	7

==== Draw 7 ====
Monday, March 4, 9:00

Sheet B	1	2	3	4	5	6	7	8	9	10	Final
Czech Republic (Černovský)	1	0	0	3	0	0	0	0	0	0	4
Switzerland (Neuenschwander) 🔨	0	1	0	0	2	0	0	2	1	3	9

Sheet C	1	2	3	4	5	6	7	8	9	10	Final
Scotland (Smith) 🔨	4	0	1	4	0	0	X	X	X	X	9
Norway (Mjøen)	0	0	0	0	2	1	X	X	X	X	3

Sheet D	1	2	3	4	5	6	7	8	9	10	Final
Sweden (Eskilsson) 🔨	0	3	0	2	0	3	0	1	0	X	9
China (Zhang)	1	0	1	0	2	0	1	0	2	X	7

==== Draw 8 ====
Monday, March 4, 19:00

Sheet A	1	2	3	4	5	6	7	8	9	10	Final
Italy (Mosaner)	0	0	1	0	0	0	0	0	2	1	4
Canada (Dunstone) 🔨	2	0	0	2	0	0	1	0	0	0	5

Sheet B	1	2	3	4	5	6	7	8	9	10	Final
Russia (Arkhipov) 🔨	1	0	0	0	1	1	0	1	0	1	5
Scotland (Smith)	0	1	0	1	0	0	0	0	2	0	4

Sheet C	1	2	3	4	5	6	7	8	9	10	11	Final
Switzerland (Neuenschwander)	2	0	0	2	0	1	0	1	1	0	1	8
China (Zhang) 🔨	0	1	0	0	2	0	2	0	0	2	0	7

Sheet D	1	2	3	4	5	6	7	8	9	10	Final
United States (Dropkin) 🔨	2	0	1	0	2	1	0	1	0	X	7
Norway (Mjøen)	0	0	0	2	0	0	1	0	1	X	4

==== Draw 9 ====
Tuesday, March 5, 14:00

Sheet A	1	2	3	4	5	6	7	8	9	10	Final
Czech Republic (Černovský)	0	0	2	0	1	0	0	0	X	X	3
Norway (Mjøen) 🔨	2	0	0	0	0	3	2	1	X	X	8

Sheet B	1	2	3	4	5	6	7	8	9	10	Final
Canada (Dunstone) 🔨	0	0	2	0	3	0	0	0	2	X	7
United States (Dropkin)	0	1	0	1	0	1	0	0	0	X	3

Sheet C	1	2	3	4	5	6	7	8	9	10	Final
Sweden (Eskilsson)	0	0	0	0	3	3	0	0	2	X	8
Italy (Mosaner) 🔨	0	1	1	0	0	0	1	1	0	X	4

Sheet D	1	2	3	4	5	6	7	8	9	10	Final
Russia (Arkhipov)	1	0	1	0	1	0	1	1	0	1	6
Switzerland (Neuenschwander) 🔨	0	2	0	0	0	1	0	0	1	0	4

==== Draw 10 ====
Wednesday, March 6, 9:00

Sheet A	1	2	3	4	5	6	7	8	9	10	Final
Scotland (Smith)	0	0	3	0	1	0	0	1	0	1	6
Sweden (Eskilsson) 🔨	2	0	0	1	0	2	0	0	0	0	5

Sheet B	1	2	3	4	5	6	7	8	9	10	Final
Italy (Mosaner)	0	1	2	0	0	0	0	2	0	1	6
China (Zhang) 🔨	2	0	0	0	1	0	0	0	1	0	4

Sheet C	1	2	3	4	5	6	7	8	9	10	Final
Czech Republic (Černovský) 🔨	0	1	0	0	1	0	1	0	X	X	3
Russia (Arkhipov)	0	0	3	2	0	2	0	3	X	X	10

==== Draw 11 ====
Wednesday, March 6, 19:00

Sheet A	1	2	3	4	5	6	7	8	9	10	Final
China (Zhang)	0	0	0	1	0	0	0	X	X	X	1
United States (Dropkin) 🔨	2	1	0	0	1	3	1	X	X	X	8

Sheet B	1	2	3	4	5	6	7	8	9	10	Final
Switzerland (Neuenschwander) 🔨	1	0	0	1	0	0	2	0	0	0	4
Sweden (Eskilsson)	0	1	0	0	1	0	0	1	1	1	5

Sheet C	1	2	3	4	5	6	7	8	9	10	Final
Norway (Mjøen)	0	2	0	1	0	0	1	2	0	X	6
Canada (Dunstone) 🔨	2	0	2	0	3	0	0	0	2	X	9

Sheet D	1	2	3	4	5	6	7	8	9	10	Final
Scotland (Smith) 🔨	3	0	0	0	0	0	1	0	0	1	5
Czech Republic (Černovský)	0	0	0	2	0	0	0	0	2	0	4

==== Draw 12 ====
Thursday, March 7, 13:00

Sheet A	1	2	3	4	5	6	7	8	9	10	11	Final
Switzerland (Neuenschwander)	1	0	0	0	1	2	0	1	0	1	0	6
Italy (Mosaner) 🔨	0	0	1	3	0	0	0	0	2	0	3	9

Sheet B	1	2	3	4	5	6	7	8	9	10	Final
Norway (Mjøen)	0	0	1	0	1	1	0	0	X	X	3
Russia (Arkhipov) 🔨	1	1	0	2	0	0	0	4	X	X	8

Sheet C	1	2	3	4	5	6	7	8	9	10	Final
United States (Dropkin)	0	1	0	1	0	0	0	1	X	X	3
Scotland (Smith) 🔨	1	0	3	0	0	1	3	0	X	X	8

Sheet D	1	2	3	4	5	6	7	8	9	10	Final
China (Zhang) 🔨	0	1	0	1	1	0	0	0	0	X	3
Canada (Dunstone)	1	0	1	0	0	2	1	2	1	X	8

=== Playoffs ===
Page playoff system
1	Scotland	8
2	Canada	6
3	Russia	6
4	Sweden	4

Semifinal
2	Canada	8
3	Russia	11

Gold-medal game
1	Scotland	6
3	Russia	2

Bronze-medal game
2	Canada	6
4	Sweden	4

==== 1 vs. 2 ====
Friday, March 8, 19:00

Sheet C	1	2	3	4	5	6	7	8	9	10	11	Final
Scotland (Smith)	0	1	0	0	1	0	2	1	0	1	2	8
Canada (Dunstone) 🔨	0	0	0	1	0	3	0	0	2	0	0	6

==== 3 vs. 4 ====
Friday, March 8, 19:00

Sheet B	1	2	3	4	5	6	7	8	9	10	Final
Russia (Arkhipov) 🔨	0	0	1	0	2	1	0	0	2	X	6
Sweden (Eskilsson)	0	1	0	1	0	0	2	0	0	X	4

==== Semifinal ====
Saturday, March 9, 19:00

Sheet D	1	2	3	4	5	6	7	8	9	10	11	Final
Canada (Dunstone) 🔨	2	0	2	0	2	0	1	0	0	1	0	8
Russia (Arkhipov)	0	2	0	2	0	1	0	2	1	0	3	11

==== Bronze-medal game ====
Sunday, March 9, 9:00

Sheet B	1	2	3	4	5	6	7	8	9	10	Final
Canada (Dunstone) 🔨	0	3	0	0	1	0	2	0	0	X	6
Sweden (Eskilsson)	0	0	0	2	0	1	0	1	0	X	4

==== Gold-medal game ====
Sunday, March 9, 9:00

Sheet C	1	2	3	4	5	6	7	8	9	10	Final
Scotland (Smith) 🔨	0	2	0	1	1	0	1	0	1	X	6
Russia (Arkhipov)	0	0	0	0	0	0	0	2	0	X	2

== Women ==
=== Teams ===
The teams are listed as follows:

Country	Skip	Third	Second	Lead	Alternate
Canada	Corryn Brown	Erin Pincott	Samantha Fisher	Sydney Fraser	Cathlia Ward
Czech Republic	Iveta Janatová (fourth)	Zuzana Hájková (skip)	Klára Svatoňová	Alžběta Baudyšová	Petra Vinšová
Denmark	Stephanie Risdal Nielsen	Jannie Gundry	Isabella Clemmensen	Charlotte Clemmensen	Julie Dall Høgh
Japan	Sayaka Yoshimura	Rina Ida	Risa Ujihara	Mao Ishigaki	Natsuko Ishiyama
Norway	Kristine Davanger	Nora Hilding	Ingvild Skaga	Stine Haalien	Julie Kjær Molnar
Russia	Yulia Portunova (fourth)	Alina Kovaleva (skip)	Aleksandra Saitova	Oksana Gertova	Olesia Gluschenko
Scotland	Hannah Fleming	Lauren Gray	Jennifer Dodds	Abi Brown	Vicky Wright
Sweden	Sara McManus	Sofia Mabergs	Rosalie Egli	Malin Ekholm	Maria Stener
Switzerland	Michelle Gribi	Lisa Gisler	Chantal Bugnon	Vera Camponovo	Jenny Perret
United States	Miranda Solem	Vicky Persinger	Karlie Koenig	Chelsea Solem	Cory Christensen

=== Round-robin standings ===
Final Round Robin Standings

Key
Teams to Playoffs
Teams to Tiebreakers

Country	Skip	W	L
Scotland	Hannah Fleming	8	1
Japan	Sayaka Yoshimura	6	3
Czech Republic	Zuzana Hájková	5	4
Russia	Alina Kovaleva	5	4
Sweden	Sara McManus	5	4
Denmark	Stephanie Risdal Nielsen	5	4
United States	Miranda Solem	4	5
Canada	Corryn Brown	3	6
Switzerland	Michelle Gribi	3	6
Norway	Kristine Davanger	1	8

=== Round-robin results ===
All draw times are listed in Moscow Time (UTC+4).

==== Draw 1 ====
Thursday, February 28, 14:00

Sheet A	1	2	3	4	5	6	7	8	9	10	Final
Canada (Brown)	0	0	0	1	0	0	X	X	X	X	1
Denmark (Nielsen) 🔨	2	1	1	0	3	2	X	X	X	X	9

Sheet B	1	2	3	4	5	6	7	8	9	10	Final
Norway (Davanger)	0	0	1	0	0	1	0	2	1	0	5
Russia (Kovaleva) 🔨	0	2	0	1	1	0	2	0	0	1	7

Sheet C	1	2	3	4	5	6	7	8	9	10	Final
Switzerland (Gribi)	0	0	2	0	0	1	0	1	0	X	4
Japan (Yoshimura) 🔨	2	0	0	2	1	0	2	0	1	X	8

Sheet D	1	2	3	4	5	6	7	8	9	10	Final
Scotland (Fleming)	0	0	4	0	0	4	0	0	1	0	9
United States (Solem) 🔨	0	2	0	0	1	0	2	1	0	1	7

==== Draw 2 ====
Friday, March 1, 9:00

Sheet A	1	2	3	4	5	6	7	8	9	10	Final
Norway (Davanger) 🔨	0	0	0	1	0	0	1	1	0	X	3
United States (Solem)	0	1	0	0	1	2	0	0	4	X	8

Sheet B	1	2	3	4	5	6	7	8	9	10	Final
Switzerland (Gribi)	0	0	1	0	2	0	0	0	0	X	3
Denmark (Nielsen) 🔨	0	1	0	2	0	0	0	4	1	X	8

Sheet C	1	2	3	4	5	6	7	8	9	10	Final
Scotland (Fleming) 🔨	0	0	1	0	2	0	2	1	0	1	7
Russia (Kovaleva)	0	0	0	2	0	1	0	0	1	0	4

Sheet D	1	2	3	4	5	6	7	8	9	10	Final
Czech Republic (Hájková)	0	0	0	1	0	1	0	2	1	2	7
Sweden (McManus) 🔨	0	1	0	0	4	0	1	0	0	0	6

==== Draw 3 ====
Friday, March 1, 19:00

Sheet A	1	2	3	4	5	6	7	8	9	10	Final
Japan (Yoshimura)	0	0	0	0	1	1	0	2	0	1	5
Russia (Kovaleva) 🔨	0	0	0	1	0	0	1	0	2	0	4

Sheet B	1	2	3	4	5	6	7	8	9	10	Final
Czech Republic (Hájková)	0	0	1	0	1	1	1	0	3	0	7
Norway (Davanger) 🔨	2	0	0	1	0	0	0	1	0	1	5

Sheet C	1	2	3	4	5	6	7	8	9	10	Final
United States (Solem) 🔨	0	1	0	1	0	2	2	0	1	X	7
Sweden (McManus)	0	0	1	0	1	0	0	1	0	X	3

Sheet D	1	2	3	4	5	6	7	8	9	10	Final
Canada (Brown)	0	0	0	0	1	0	0	1	0	0	2
Scotland (Fleming) 🔨	0	0	1	0	0	1	0	0	0	1	3

==== Draw 4 ====
Saturday, March 2, 14:00

Sheet A	1	2	3	4	5	6	7	8	9	10	Final
Sweden (McManus) 🔨	2	0	0	1	0	0	2	0	0	X	5
Scotland (Fleming)	0	2	0	0	2	2	0	2	1	X	9

Sheet B	1	2	3	4	5	6	7	8	9	10	Final
Russia (Kovaleva) 🔨	1	1	0	0	0	3	0	4	X	X	9
Canada (Brown)	0	0	1	0	1	0	1	0	X	X	3

Sheet C	1	2	3	4	5	6	7	8	9	10	11	Final
Czech Republic (Hájková) 🔨	0	0	2	0	0	0	0	2	0	2	0	6
Switzerland (Gribi)	0	1	0	0	1	0	2	0	2	0	1	7

Sheet D	1	2	3	4	5	6	7	8	9	10	Final
Denmark (Nielsen) 🔨	0	0	1	0	1	0	0	X	X	X	2
Japan (Yoshimura)	2	0	0	1	0	4	1	X	X	X	8

==== Draw 5 ====
Sunday, March 3, 9:00

Sheet B	1	2	3	4	5	6	7	8	9	10	Final
Denmark (Nielsen) 🔨	0	2	0	2	0	1	1	0	1	X	7
United States (Solem)	1	0	1	0	2	0	0	1	0	X	5

Sheet C	1	2	3	4	5	6	7	8	9	10	Final
Canada (Brown) 🔨	2	0	0	0	0	1	0	1	0	0	4
Japan (Yoshimura)	0	2	0	1	1	0	2	0	1	2	9

Sheet D	1	2	3	4	5	6	7	8	9	10	Final
Norway (Davanger) 🔨	0	2	1	0	2	0	1	0	2	X	8
Switzerland (Gribi)	0	0	0	2	0	2	0	0	0	X	4

==== Draw 6 ====
Sunday, March 3, 19:00

Sheet A	1	2	3	4	5	6	7	8	9	10	Final
Switzerland (Gribi)	0	1	0	0	1	0	1	1	0	–	L
United States (Solem) 🔨	0	0	2	1	0	3	0	0	1		W

Switzerland ran out of time in the tenth end, and conceded the game to the United States.

Sheet B	1	2	3	4	5	6	7	8	9	10	11	Final
Scotland (Fleming)	0	2	0	2	0	2	0	1	0	0	1	8
Czech Republic (Hájková) 🔨	0	0	0	0	1	0	3	0	1	2	0	7

Sheet C	1	2	3	4	5	6	7	8	9	10	Final
Norway (Davanger)	0	0	1	0	2	0	0	1	0	0	4
Denmark (Nielsen) 🔨	2	1	0	1	0	0	1	0	2	2	9

Sheet D	1	2	3	4	5	6	7	8	9	10	Final
Sweden (McManus) 🔨	2	0	0	0	2	0	0	0	1	X	5
Russia (Kovaleva)	0	1	3	1	0	1	0	2	0	X	8

==== Draw 7 ====
Monday, March 4, 14:00

Sheet A	1	2	3	4	5	6	7	8	9	10	Final
Czech Republic (Hájková)	1	0	1	0	1	0	0	1	0	X	4
Canada (Brown) 🔨	0	1	0	2	0	1	1	0	4	X	9

Sheet B	1	2	3	4	5	6	7	8	9	10	Final
Japan (Yoshimura)	0	0	0	1	0	1	0	1	0	X	3
Sweden (McManus) 🔨	0	0	1	0	1	0	3	0	3	X	8

Sheet C	1	2	3	4	5	6	7	8	9	10	Final
Russia (Kovaleva)	0	0	2	0	1	0	1	5	X	X	9
United States (Solem) 🔨	0	1	0	1	0	1	0	0	X	X	3

Sheet D	1	2	3	4	5	6	7	8	9	10	Final
Scotland (Fleming) 🔨	2	1	0	2	3	0	1	0	X	X	9
Norway (Davanger)	0	0	1	0	0	1	0	1	X	X	3

==== Draw 8 ====
Tuesday, March 5, 9:00

Sheet A	1	2	3	4	5	6	7	8	9	10	Final
Denmark (Nielsen) 🔨	1	0	0	1	0	0	0	1	0	X	3
Sweden (McManus)	0	0	3	0	0	0	1	0	4	X	8

Sheet B	1	2	3	4	5	6	7	8	9	10	Final
Canada (Brown)	0	0	0	0	2	0	0	0	0	1	3
Switzerland (Gribi) 🔨	0	0	0	2	0	0	0	2	0	0	4

Sheet D	1	2	3	4	5	6	7	8	9	10	Final
Japan (Yoshimura)	0	0	0	0	3	0	1	1	0	X	5
Czech Republic (Hájková) 🔨	0	3	0	2	0	2	0	0	2	X	9

==== Draw 9 ====
Tuesday, March 5, 19:00

Sheet A	1	2	3	4	5	6	7	8	9	10	Final
Russia (Kovaleva) 🔨	0	0	1	0	3	0	0	1	0	X	5
Switzerland (Gribi)	0	1	0	1	0	0	4	0	1	X	7

Sheet B	1	2	3	4	5	6	7	8	9	10	Final
Denmark (Nielsen)	0	0	1	0	0	1	1	0	0	X	3
Scotland (Fleming) 🔨	2	0	0	2	0	0	0	2	1	X	7

Sheet C	1	2	3	4	5	6	7	8	9	10	Final
Japan (Yoshimura) 🔨	0	0	0	5	0	0	2	1	X	X	8
Norway (Davanger)	0	0	0	0	1	1	0	0	X	X	2

Sheet D	1	2	3	4	5	6	7	8	9	10	Final
United States (Solem)	1	0	1	1	0	0	0	1	0	X	4
Canada (Brown) 🔨	0	2	0	0	2	1	1	0	4	X	10

==== Draw 10 ====
Wednesday, March 6, 14:00

Sheet A	1	2	3	4	5	6	7	8	9	10	Final
United States (Solem) 🔨	0	0	1	1	0	0	0	1	0	0	3
Czech Republic (Hájková)	0	3	0	0	0	0	1	0	1	2	7

Sheet B	1	2	3	4	5	6	7	8	9	10	Final
Sweden (McManus)	1	0	1	1	2	0	1	0	1	X	7
Norway (Davanger) 🔨	0	0	0	0	0	1	0	3	0	X	5

Sheet C	1	2	3	4	5	6	7	8	9	10	Final
Switzerland (Gribi)	0	0	0	1	0	0	1	X	X	X	2
Scotland (Fleming) 🔨	0	2	1	0	3	1	0	X	X	X	7

Sheet D	1	2	3	4	5	6	7	8	9	10	Final
Russia (Kovaleva) 🔨	0	2	3	0	4	0	X	X	X	X	9
Denmark (Nielsen)	1	0	0	1	0	1	X	X	X	X	3

==== Draw 11 ====
Thursday, March 7, 8:30

Sheet A	1	2	3	4	5	6	7	8	9	10	Final
Scotland (Fleming)	0	0	2	0	2	0	0	1	0	X	6
Japan (Yoshimura) 🔨	0	1	0	2	0	2	1	0	2	X	8

Sheet B	1	2	3	4	5	6	7	8	9	10	Final
Czech Republic (Hájková)	0	0	1	0	1	0	0	1	1	3	7
Russia (Kovaleva) 🔨	0	1	0	1	0	1	0	0	0	0	3

Sheet C	1	2	3	4	5	6	7	8	9	10	Final
Sweden (McManus) 🔨	1	2	0	2	0	0	0	2	0	0	7
Canada (Brown)	0	0	1	0	0	2	1	0	1	1	6

==== Draw 12 ====
Thursday, March 7, 17:30

Sheet A	1	2	3	4	5	6	7	8	9	10	Final
Canada (Brown)	0	1	1	2	0	0	0	4	0	X	8
Norway (Davanger) 🔨	3	0	0	0	1	0	0	0	2	X	6

Sheet B	1	2	3	4	5	6	7	8	9	10	11	Final
United States (Solem)	0	0	0	1	0	3	0	2	0	0	1	7
Japan (Yoshimura) 🔨	0	0	1	0	1	0	2	0	1	1	0	6

Sheet C	1	2	3	4	5	6	7	8	9	10	Final
Denmark (Nielsen) 🔨	3	2	0	1	1	0	0	2	0	0	9
Czech Republic (Hájková)	0	0	2	0	0	1	1	0	2	1	7

Sheet D	1	2	3	4	5	6	7	8	9	10	Final
Switzerland (Gribi)	0	0	1	0	1	0	1	0	X	X	3
Sweden (McManus) 🔨	2	0	0	2	0	2	0	2	X	X	8

=== Tiebreakers ===
Friday, March 8, 14:00

Sheet A	1	2	3	4	5	6	7	8	9	10	Final
Czech Republic (Hájková)	0	1	0	1	0	2	1	0	3	X	8
Denmark (Nielsen) 🔨	2	0	0	0	1	0	0	1	0	X	4

Sheet C	1	2	3	4	5	6	7	8	9	10	Final
Russia (Kovaleva) 🔨	0	3	2	0	0	3	X	X	X	X	8
Sweden (McManus)	0	0	0	0	1	0	X	X	X	X	1

=== Playoffs ===
Page playoff system
1	Scotland	4
2	Japan	3
3	Czech Republic	2
4	Russia	4

Semifinal
2	Japan	6
4	Russia	8

Gold-medal game
1	Scotland	5
4	Russia	6

Bronze-medal game
2	Japan	8
3	Czech Republic	4

==== 1 vs. 2 ====
Saturday, March 9, 12:00

Sheet C	1	2	3	4	5	6	7	8	9	10	Final
Scotland (Fleming) 🔨	0	1	0	0	1	0	0	1	0	1	4
Japan (Yoshimura)	0	0	0	1	0	0	1	0	1	0	3

==== 3 vs. 4 ====
Saturday, March 9, 12:00

Sheet B	1	2	3	4	5	6	7	8	9	10	Final
Czech Republic (Hájková) 🔨	1	0	0	0	0	0	0	0	0	1	2
Russia (Kovaleva)	0	1	0	2	0	0	0	1	0	0	4

==== Semifinal ====
Saturday, March 9, 19:00

Sheet A	1	2	3	4	5	6	7	8	9	10	Final
Japan (Yoshimura) 🔨	2	0	1	1	0	2	0	0	0	X	6
Russia (Kovaleva)	0	1	0	0	1	0	2	2	2	X	8

==== Bronze-medal game ====
Sunday, March 9, 13:00

Sheet B	1	2	3	4	5	6	7	8	9	10	Final
Japan (Yoshimura) 🔨	2	0	0	2	1	0	1	0	2	X	8
Czech Republic (Hájková)	0	2	0	0	0	1	0	1	0	X	4

==== Gold-medal game ====
Sunday, March 9, 13:00

Sheet C	1	2	3	4	5	6	7	8	9	10	11	Final
Scotland (Fleming) 🔨	0	2	0	1	0	0	0	0	0	2	0	5
Russia (Kovaleva)	0	0	1	0	2	0	0	2	0	0	1	6
