= Gaute Nepstad =

Norwegian curler (born 1994)

- Curler
- Born: 9 September 1994 (age 32); Bergen, Norway

Curling career
- Member Association: Norway
- World Championship: 4 (2022, 2023, 2024, 2025)
- European Championship: 3 (2023, 2024, 2025)
- Olympic: 1 (2026)
Medal record
Curling
Representing Norway
European Championships
Bronze medal – third place	2024 Lohja
World Junior Curling Championships
Bronze medal – third place	2014 Flims
Winter Universiade
Gold medal – first place	2019 Krasnoyarsk
Norwegian Men's Curling Championship
Gold medal – first place	2022 Trondheim
Gold medal – first place	2023 Oppdal
Gold medal – first place	2026 Lillehammer
Silver medal – second place	2014 Trondheim
Silver medal – second place	2025 Halden
Bronze medal – third place	2024 Oslo

Gaute Nepstad (born 9 September 1994 in Bergen) is a retired Norwegian curler, originally from Ottestad in the Hamar area. He played lead on the 2024 European Bronze Medalist Magnus Ramsfjell team from Trondheim. He currently lives and studies in Trondheim.

== Curling career ==
=== Juniors ===
Nepstad began curling at the age of 11, when he and his friends wanted to try the sport. He played on a frozen association football pitch in Ottestad, near his childhood home. Eventually, he started travelling to a club in Lillehammer with better ice conditions. In 2009, he was the runner-up at the Norwegian U17 boys championship.

Nepstad was a member the Norwegian junior men's team at the 2013, 2014 and 2015 World Junior Curling Championships. In 2013 and 2014, the team was skipped by Eirik Mjøen. In 2013, Nepstad was the alternate on the team, but played in five games. The team finished in 5th place. In 2014, Nepstad played lead on the team. After finishing the round robin in first place with a 7–2 record, the team lost the semifinal to Switzerland, but won the bronze medal game against Canada. In 2015, Nepstad skipped the team, but threw lead rocks. He led his team of Markus Skogvold, Martin Sesaker and Wilhelm Naess to a 4–5 record, finishing in sixth place. That year, Nepstad won the WJCC Sportsmanship Award. After juniors, Nepstad stopped curling for awhile.

=== Men's ===
After taking a break from curling, Nepstead returned to curling in 2019 and played lead on Team Norway at the 2019 Winter Universiade, on a team skipped by Magnus Ramsfjell. The team went on to win the gold medal.

The Magnus Ramsfjell rink, with Nepstad throwing lead stones won the 2022 Norwegian Men's Curling Championship. It was Nepstad's first national men's championship. The team was chosen to represent Norway at the 2022 World Men's Curling Championship, where they finished in 10th with a 5–7 record. That season, the team also won the 2021 Prague Classic World Curling Tour event.

During the 2022–23 curling season, the team won the Norwegian men's championship again and won the 2022 Curling Masters Champéry World Curling Tour event. They also played in the 2022 Masters and 2023 Canadian Open Grand Slam of Curling events. They made it to the semifinals of the Masters and failed to qualify for the playoffs in the Canadian Open. The team was chosen to represent Norway once again at the 2023 World Men's Curling Championship, where they went 10–2 in the round robin. This put the team in the playoffs, where they lost to Italy (skipped by Joël Retornaz) in the qualification game. The following week, the team played in the 2023 Players' Championship, where they went 2–3, missing the playoffs. Team Ramsfjell would win their first men's international medal at the 2024 European Curling Championships, where they would finish round-robin play with a 6–3 record and after losing in the semifinals, would beat Switzerland's Yannick Schwaller 7–4 to win the bronze medal.

Team Ramsfjell would represent Norway at the 2026 Winter Olympics, where they would qualify for the playoffs after finishing round robin with a 5–4 record. However, they would lose to Canada's Brad Jacobs in the semifinals and Switzerland's Yannick Schwaller 9–1 in the bronze medal game to finish in 4th place. Nepstad would then announce his retirement at the end of the 2025–26 curling season to "pursue other personal goals".

== Personal life ==
Nepstad works as a data scientist for SpareBank 1 SMN.
