= 2019 World Junior Curling Championships =

- Host city: Liverpool, Nova Scotia, Canada
- Arena: Queens Place Emera Centre
- Dates: February 16–23
- Men's winner: Canada
- Skip: Tyler Tardi
- Third: Sterling Middleton
- Second: Matthew Hall
- Lead: Alex Horvath
- Alternate: Rylan Kleiter
- Finalist: Switzerland (Marco Hösli)
- Women's winner: Russia
- Skip: Vlada Rumiantseva
- Third: Daria Morozova
- Second: Irina Riazanova
- Lead: Vera Tiuliakova
- Alternate: Anastasia Mishchenko
- Finalist: Canada (Selena Sturmay)

The 2019 World Junior Curling Championships was held from February 16 to 23 at the Queens Place Emera Centre in Liverpool, Nova Scotia, Canada.

== Men ==
=== Teams ===
Men's teams

Country	Skip	Third	Second	Lead	Alternate
Canada	Tyler Tardi	Sterling Middleton	Matthew Hall	Alex Horvath	Rylan Kleiter
China	Wang Weihaoping	Nan Jiawen	Qiao Bozong	Jiang Hanpu	Zhang Yansong
Germany	Sixten Totzek (fourth)	Klaudius Harsch (skip)	Joshua Sutor	Magnus Sutor	Jan Luca Häg
Italy	Luca Rizzolli	Mattia Giovanella	Alessandro Odorizzi	Giovanni Gottardi	Luca Casagrande
New Zealand	Anton Hood (fourth)	Ben Smith	Matthew Neilson (skip)	Hunter Walker	Jayden Bishop
Norway	Magnus Ramsfjell	Michael Mellemseter	Jørgen Myran	Andreas Hårstad	Ingebrigt Bjørnstad
Scotland	Ross Whyte	Duncan McFadzean	James Craik	Euan Kyle	Ryan McCormack
Sweden	Daniel Berggren	Johan Jaervenson	Emil Hermansson	Albert Berglund	Johan Nygren
Switzerland	Marco Hösli	Philipp Hösli	Marco Hefti	Jannis Spiess	Yves Stocker
United States	Andrew Stopera	Luc Violette	Ben Richardson	Graem Fenson	Riley Fenson

=== Round-robin standings ===
Final Round Robin Standings

Key
Teams to Playoffs
Teams to relegated to "B" championships

Country	Skip	W	L
Scotland	Ross Whyte	9	0
Canada	Tyler Tardi	7	2
Norway	Magnus Ramsfjell	6	3
Switzerland	Marco Hösli	6	3
United States	Andrew Stopera	5	4
New Zealand	Matthew Neilson	4	5
Germany	Klaudius Harsch	3	6
Sweden	Daniel Berggren	2	7
China	Wang Weihaoping	2	7
Italy	Luca Rizzolli	1	8

Team	Canada	China	Germany	Italy	New Zealand	Norway	Scotland	Sweden	Switzerland	United States	Record
Canada		6–2	8–6	10–3	12–1	6–4	7–8	9–5	8–3	7–8	7–2
China	2–6		3–6	8–6	4–6	7–9	4–10	3–8	5–6	9–8	2–7
Germany	6–8	6–3		10–5	5–6	8–9	2–8	7–9	5–6	7–3	3–6
Italy	3–10	6–8	5–10		4–5	6–10	1–12	10–9	6–7	3–7	1–8
New Zealand	1–12	6–4	6–5	5–4		6–7	2–6	7–5	5–7	3–8	4–5
Norway	4–6	9–7	9–8	10–6	7–6		4–9	10–7	9–6	5–9	6–3
Scotland	8–7	10–4	8–2	12–1	6–2	9–4		11–4	8–6	11–5	9–0
Sweden	5–9	8–3	9–7	9–10	5–7	7–10	4–11		6–11	5–7	2–7
Switzerland	3–8	6–5	6–5	7–6	7–5	6–9	6–8	11–6		7–6	6–3
United States	8–7	8–9	3–7	7–3	8–3	9–5	5–11	7–5	6–7		5–4

=== Round-robin results ===
==== Draw 1 ====
Saturday, February 16, 19:30

Sheet A	1	2	3	4	5	6	7	8	9	10	Final
Sweden (Berggren)	0	2	0	0	0	1	1	0	X	X	4
Scotland (Whyte) 🔨	2	0	2	2	4	0	0	1	X	X	11

Sheet B	1	2	3	4	5	6	7	8	9	10	11	Final
Canada (Tardi)	1	0	0	3	0	0	2	0	0	1	0	7
United States (Stopera) 🔨	0	0	1	0	0	2	0	3	1	0	1	8

Sheet C	1	2	3	4	5	6	7	8	9	10	Final
Norway (Ramsfjell) 🔨	2	0	3	1	0	0	2	0	0	1	9
Switzerland (Hösli)	0	2	0	0	1	0	0	2	1	0	6

Sheet D	1	2	3	4	5	6	7	8	9	10	Final
China (Wang)	0	0	0	0	0	2	0	0	1	X	3
Germany (Harsch) 🔨	0	0	1	2	1	0	1	1	0	X	6

Sheet E	1	2	3	4	5	6	7	8	9	10	Final
New Zealand (Neilson) 🔨	1	0	0	0	1	0	1	1	0	1	5
Italy (Rizzolli)	0	0	0	1	0	1	0	0	2	0	4

==== Draw 2 ====
Sunday, February 17, 15:00

Sheet A	1	2	3	4	5	6	7	8	9	10	11	12	Final
United States (Stopera)	1	0	2	0	3	0	0	0	2	0	0	0	8
China (Wang) 🔨	0	0	0	3	0	1	1	0	0	3	0	1	9

Sheet B	1	2	3	4	5	6	7	8	9	10	Final
Scotland (Whyte) 🔨	0	3	0	0	2	1	1	1	X	X	8
Germany (Harsch)	0	0	0	2	0	0	0	0	X	X	2

Sheet C	1	2	3	4	5	6	7	8	9	10	11	Final
New Zealand (Neilson)	1	0	0	0	1	1	0	1	0	1	2	7
Sweden (Berggren) 🔨	0	3	0	1	0	0	1	0	0	0	0	5

Sheet D	1	2	3	4	5	6	7	8	9	10	Final
Italy (Rizzolli) 🔨	1	0	1	0	0	1	0	2	1	0	6
Switzerland (Hösli)	0	1	0	3	1	0	1	0	0	1	7

Sheet E	1	2	3	4	5	6	7	8	9	10	Final
Canada (Tardi) 🔨	0	0	3	0	0	0	1	0	2	X	6
Norway (Ramsfjell)	0	0	0	1	1	0	0	2	0	X	4

==== Draw 3 ====
Monday, February 18, 9:00

Sheet A	1	2	3	4	5	6	7	8	9	10	Final
Switzerland (Hösli) 🔨	0	0	1	0	1	0	1	0	0	X	3
Canada (Tardi)	1	1	0	2	0	2	0	1	1	X	8

Sheet B	1	2	3	4	5	6	7	8	9	10	11	Final
Sweden (Berggren) 🔨	2	0	3	0	0	1	0	0	0	3	0	9
Italy (Rizzolli)	0	1	0	1	2	0	2	2	1	0	1	10

Sheet C	1	2	3	4	5	6	7	8	9	10	Final
Scotland (Whyte)	0	4	0	0	4	0	2	0	X	X	10
China (Wang) 🔨	1	0	1	0	0	1	0	1	X	X	4

Sheet D	1	2	3	4	5	6	7	8	9	10	Final
Norway (Ramsfjell)	1	0	3	0	1	0	2	0	0	X	7
New Zealand (Neilson) 🔨	0	1	0	2	0	0	0	2	1	X	6

Sheet E	1	2	3	4	5	6	7	8	9	10	Final
United States (Stopera)	0	0	0	0	0	2	0	1	0	X	3
Germany (Harsch) 🔨	1	0	1	1	3	0	1	0	0	X	7

==== Draw 4 ====
Monday, February 18, 19:00

Sheet A	1	2	3	4	5	6	7	8	9	10	11	Final
Germany (Harsch)	0	0	0	3	1	0	0	0	1	0	0	5
New Zealand (Neilson) 🔨	0	0	1	0	0	0	2	1	0	1	1	6

Sheet B	1	2	3	4	5	6	7	8	9	10	Final
Norway (Ramsfjell) 🔨	1	0	0	0	2	0	2	2	1	1	9
China (Wang)	0	2	2	1	0	2	0	0	0	0	7

Sheet C	1	2	3	4	5	6	7	8	9	10	Final
Italy (Rizzolli)	0	0	0	0	1	2	0	0	0	X	3
United States (Stopera) 🔨	0	1	1	1	0	0	0	2	2	X	7

Sheet D	1	2	3	4	5	6	7	8	9	10	Final
Switzerland (Hösli) 🔨	2	2	0	0	3	0	0	2	2	X	11
Sweden (Berggren)	0	0	2	1	0	2	1	0	0	X	6

Sheet E	1	2	3	4	5	6	7	8	9	10	11	Final
Scotland (Whyte)	0	0	3	0	2	1	0	1	0	0	1	8
Canada (Tardi) 🔨	1	0	0	2	0	0	2	0	1	1	0	7

==== Draw 5 ====
Tuesday, February 19, 14:00

Sheet A	1	2	3	4	5	6	7	8	9	10	Final
Norway (Ramsfjell)	0	0	2	0	0	2	1	0	0	X	5
United States (Stopera) 🔨	0	3	0	3	1	0	0	1	1	X	9

Sheet B	1	2	3	4	5	6	7	8	9	10	Final
New Zealand (Neilson) 🔨	0	0	0	1	0	0	1	0	X	X	2
Scotland (Whyte)	1	1	1	0	1	2	0	0	X	X	6

Sheet C	1	2	3	4	5	6	7	8	9	10	Final
Sweden (Berggren) 🔨	1	0	0	3	0	2	0	1	1	1	9
Germany (Harsch)	0	2	0	0	2	0	3	0	0	0	7

Sheet D	1	2	3	4	5	6	7	8	9	10	Final
Canada (Tardi)	1	1	0	3	0	5	X	X	X	X	10
Italy (Rizzolli) 🔨	0	0	1	0	2	0	X	X	X	X	3

Sheet E	1	2	3	4	5	6	7	8	9	10	11	Final
China (Wang)	0	1	0	0	0	0	2	1	0	1	0	5
Switzerland (Hösli) 🔨	1	0	0	2	1	0	0	0	1	0	1	6

==== Draw 6 ====
Wednesday, February 20, 9:00

Sheet A	1	2	3	4	5	6	7	8	9	10	Final
New Zealand (Neilson) 🔨	1	0	1	0	1	0	1	1	0	X	5
Switzerland (Hösli)	0	1	0	4	0	2	0	0	0	X	7

Sheet B	1	2	3	4	5	6	7	8	9	10	Final
United States (Stopera) 🔨	2	1	0	0	2	0	0	0	2	X	7
Sweden (Berggren)	0	0	2	2	0	0	1	0	0	X	5

Sheet C	1	2	3	4	5	6	7	8	9	10	Final
China (Wang)	1	0	0	0	0	0	0	1	0	X	2
Canada (Tardi) 🔨	0	0	2	0	1	2	0	0	1	X	6

Sheet D	1	2	3	4	5	6	7	8	9	10	Final
Germany (Harsch) 🔨	0	2	0	0	2	0	3	0	1	0	8
Norway (Ramsfjell)	1	0	1	1	0	2	0	3	0	1	9

Sheet E	1	2	3	4	5	6	7	8	9	10	Final
Italy (Rizzolli)	0	0	0	1	0	0	X	X	X	X	1
Scotland (Whyte) 🔨	4	1	3	0	2	2	X	X	X	X	12

==== Draw 7 ====
Wednesday, February 20, 19:00

Sheet A	1	2	3	4	5	6	7	8	9	10	Final
Canada (Tardi)	1	0	0	1	1	1	0	0	0	4	8
Germany (Harsch) 🔨	0	3	0	0	0	0	2	0	1	0	6

Sheet B	1	2	3	4	5	6	7	8	9	10	Final
Italy (Rizzolli)	0	1	0	3	0	0	2	0	0	X	6
Norway (Ramsfjell) 🔨	1	0	3	0	1	2	0	2	1	X	10

Sheet C	1	2	3	4	5	6	7	8	9	10	Final
Switzerland (Hösli) 🔨	0	2	0	0	1	1	1	0	1	X	6
Scotland (Whyte)	0	0	3	0	0	0	0	5	0	X	8

Sheet D	1	2	3	4	5	6	7	8	9	10	Final
New Zealand (Neilson) 🔨	0	1	1	0	1	0	0	0	X	X	3
United States (Stopera)	0	0	0	3	0	2	2	1	X	X	8

Sheet E	1	2	3	4	5	6	7	8	9	10	Final
Sweden (Berggren) 🔨	1	1	0	0	0	2	2	0	2	X	8
China (Wang)	0	0	1	1	0	0	0	1	0	X	3

==== Draw 8 ====
Thursday, February 21, 14:00

Sheet A	1	2	3	4	5	6	7	8	9	10	Final
Scotland (Whyte) 🔨	0	1	0	0	2	3	2	0	1	X	9
Norway (Ramsfjell)	0	0	1	1	0	0	0	2	0	X	4

Sheet B	1	2	3	4	5	6	7	8	9	10	11	Final
China (Wang) 🔨	0	0	0	1	0	3	0	0	0	0	0	4
New Zealand (Neilson)	0	0	0	0	1	0	0	2	0	1	2	6

Sheet C	1	2	3	4	5	6	7	8	9	10	Final
Germany (Harsch)	4	0	4	0	0	0	0	2	X	X	10
Italy (Rizzolli)	0	1	0	1	1	1	1	0	X	X	5

Sheet D	1	2	3	4	5	6	7	8	9	10	Final
Sweden (Berggren)	0	1	0	1	0	1	1	1	0	X	5
Canada (Tardi) 🔨	2	0	2	0	3	0	0	0	2	X	9

Sheet E	1	2	3	4	5	6	7	8	9	10	Final
Switzerland (Hösli) 🔨	2	0	0	1	1	0	2	1	0	0	7
United States (Stopera)	0	1	1	0	0	1	0	0	2	1	6

==== Draw 9 ====
Friday, February 22, 9:00

Sheet A	1	2	3	4	5	6	7	8	9	10	Final
China (Wang) 🔨	2	0	0	1	0	2	0	2	0	1	8
Italy (Rizzolli)	0	1	1	0	1	0	2	0	1	0	6

Sheet B	1	2	3	4	5	6	7	8	9	10	11	Final
Germany (Harsch) 🔨	1	0	0	0	0	0	2	0	1	1	0	5
Switzerland (Hösli)	0	1	1	1	1	0	0	1	0	0	1	6

Sheet C	1	2	3	4	5	6	7	8	9	10	Final
Canada (Tardi) 🔨	3	0	0	5	0	4	X	X	X	X	12
New Zealand (Neilson)	0	1	0	0	0	0	X	X	X	X	1

Sheet D	1	2	3	4	5	6	7	8	9	10	Final
Scotland (Whyte)	0	4	0	5	1	0	0	1	X	X	11
United States (Stopera) 🔨	1	0	2	0	0	1	1	0	X	X	5

Sheet E	1	2	3	4	5	6	7	8	9	10	Final
Norway (Ramsfjell) 🔨	2	1	0	0	0	4	0	1	0	2	10
Sweden (Berggren)	0	0	2	1	1	0	2	0	1	0	7

=== Playoffs ===
Semifinal
1	Scotland	9
4	Switzerland	10
2	Canada	7
3	Norway	5

Final
4	Switzerland	4
2	Canada	9

Bronze-medal game
1	Scotland	8
3	Norway	5

==== Semifinal ====
Friday, February 22, 19:30

Sheet E	1	2	3	4	5	6	7	8	9	10	Final
Scotland (Whyte) 🔨	0	0	3	0	2	0	2	0	2	0	9
Switzerland (Hösli)	4	0	0	2	0	2	0	1	0	1	10

Sheet D	1	2	3	4	5	6	7	8	9	10	Final
Canada (Tardi) 🔨	2	2	0	2	0	0	0	0	0	1	7
Norway (Ramsfjell)	0	0	2	0	1	0	1	0	1	0	5

==== Bronze-medal game ====
Saturday, February 23, 10:00

Sheet D	1	2	3	4	5	6	7	8	9	10	Final
Scotland (Whyte) 🔨	0	1	3	0	2	0	1	1	0	X	8
Norway (Ramsfjell)	1	0	0	2	0	1	0	0	1	X	5

==== Final ====
Saturday, February 23, 10:00

Sheet C	1	2	3	4	5	6	7	8	9	10	Final
Switzerland (Hösli)	0	0	1	0	0	1	0	2	X	X	4
Canada (Tardi) 🔨	0	2	0	3	2	0	2	0	X	X	9

== Women ==
=== Teams ===
Women's teams

Country	Skip	Third	Second	Lead	Alternate
Canada	Selena Sturmay	Abby Marks	Kate Goodhelpsen	Paige Papley	Karlee Burgess
China	Han Yu (fourth)	Jiang Jiayi (skip)	Zhao Ruiyi	Shang Yining	Ding Yuexin
Japan	Ami Enami	Minori Suzuki	Sae Yamamoto	Mone Ryokawa	Asuka Kanai
South Korea	Kim Min-ji	Kim Hye-rin	Yang Tae-i	Kim Su-jin	
Norway	Maia Ramsfjell	Martine Rønning	Mille Haslev Nordbye	Astri Forbregd	Eirin Mesloe
Russia	Vlada Rumiantseva	Daria Morozova	Irina Riazanova	Anastasiia Mishchenko	Vera Tiuliakova
Scotland	Lisa Davie	Kirsty Barr	Annabel Skuse	Ema Barr	Beth Farmer
Sweden	Almida de Val (fourth)	Tova Sundberg (skip)	Jennie Wåhlin	Maria Larsson	Fanny Sjöberg
Switzerland	Selina Witschonke (fourth)	Raphaela Keiser (skip)	Laura Engler	Vanessa Tonoli	Nehla Meier
United States	Cait Flannery	Leah Yavarow	Lexi Lanigan	Rebecca Miles	Abigail Marquardt

=== Round-robin standings ===
Final Round Robin Standings

Key
Teams to Playoffs
Teams to relegated to "B" championships

Country	Skip	W	L
China	Jiang Jiayi	8	1
Canada	Selena Sturmay	6	3
Switzerland	Raphaela Keiser	6	3
Russia	Vlada Rumiantseva	6	3
South Korea	Kim Min-ji	6	3
Sweden	Tova Sundberg	5	4
Norway	Maia Ramsfjell	3	6
United States	Cait Flannery	2	7
Japan	Ami Enami	2	7
Scotland	Lisa Davie	1	8

Team	Canada	China	Japan	South Korea	Norway	Russia	Scotland	Sweden	Switzerland	United States	Record
Canada		7–8	9–6	8–3	8–2	8–3	5–6	3–9	6–4	7–6	6–3
China	8–7		9–3	2–7	9–8	9–7	10–6	12–1	8–2	9–8	8–1
Japan	6–9	3–9		6–7	3–8	4–7	10–4	6–12	8–7	4–11	2–7
South Korea	3–8	7–2	7–6		7–3	7–10	11–3	12–5	3–11	9–6	6–3
Norway	2–8	8–9	8–3	3–7		3–10	5–4	2–9	6–11	9–5	3–6
Russia	3–8	7–9	7–4	10–7	10–3		7–4	10–9	6–7	11–6	6–3
Scotland	6–5	6–10	4–10	3–11	4–5	4–7		6–7	7–10	5–7	1–8
Sweden	9–3	1–12	12–6	5–12	9–2	9–10	7–6		6–7	10–6	5–4
Switzerland	4–6	2–8	7–8	11–3	11–6	7–6	10–7	7–6		6–4	6–3
United States	6–7	8–9	11–4	6–9	5–9	6–11	7–5	6–10	4–6		2–7

=== Round-robin results ===
==== Draw 1 ====
Sunday, February 17, 9:00

Sheet A	1	2	3	4	5	6	7	8	9	10	Final
Scotland (Davie)	0	2	0	0	0	1	1	0	0	2	6
Canada (Sturmay) 🔨	1	0	0	1	1	0	0	2	0	0	5

Sheet B	1	2	3	4	5	6	7	8	9	10	Final
Sweden (Sundberg)	0	3	0	3	0	0	2	0	1	0	9
Russia (Rumiantseva) 🔨	2	0	1	0	2	1	0	3	0	1	10

Sheet C	1	2	3	4	5	6	7	8	9	10	Final
China (Jiang) 🔨	0	3	0	3	2	0	0	0	0	1	9
Norway (Ramsfjell)	0	0	1	0	0	4	1	2	0	0	8

Sheet D	1	2	3	4	5	6	7	8	9	10	Final
Japan (Enami)	0	0	0	2	0	0	2	0	0	X	4
United States (Flannery) 🔨	0	0	2	0	2	2	0	3	2	X	11

Sheet E	1	2	3	4	5	6	7	8	9	10	Final
South Korea (Kim)	0	0	0	0	1	0	1	1	0	X	3
Switzerland (Keiser) 🔨	1	1	2	4	0	1	0	0	2	X	11

==== Draw 2 ====
Sunday, February 17, 20:00

Sheet A	1	2	3	4	5	6	7	8	9	10	Final
Russia (Rumiantseva)	0	1	1	0	1	0	2	1	1	X	7
Japan (Enami) 🔨	1	0	0	2	0	1	0	0	0	X	4

Sheet B	1	2	3	4	5	6	7	8	9	10	Final
Canada (Sturmay) 🔨	0	1	0	0	2	0	3	0	0	1	7
United States (Flannery)	0	0	1	1	0	3	0	1	0	0	6

Sheet C	1	2	3	4	5	6	7	8	9	10	Final
South Korea (Kim) 🔨	0	0	1	1	1	3	0	5	X	X	11
Scotland (Davie)	1	1	0	0	0	0	1	0	X	X	3

Sheet D	1	2	3	4	5	6	7	8	9	10	Final
Switzerland (Keiser)	4	0	4	0	1	0	0	2	X	X	11
Norway (Ramsfjell) 🔨	0	1	0	2	0	2	1	0	X	X	6

Sheet E	1	2	3	4	5	6	7	8	9	10	Final
Sweden (Sundberg)	0	0	0	0	1	0	0	X	X	X	1
China (Jiang) 🔨	0	2	1	2	0	2	5	X	X	X	12

==== Draw 3 ====
Monday, February 18, 14:00

Sheet A	1	2	3	4	5	6	7	8	9	10	Final
Norway (Ramsfjell) 🔨	0	0	1	0	0	0	1	0	X	X	2
Sweden (Sundberg)	1	1	0	2	0	1	0	4	X	X	9

Sheet B	1	2	3	4	5	6	7	8	9	10	Final
Scotland (Davie) 🔨	1	0	2	0	1	0	1	0	2	0	7
Switzerland (Keiser)	0	3	0	2	0	1	0	3	0	1	10

Sheet C	1	2	3	4	5	6	7	8	9	10	Final
Canada (Sturmay)	2	3	0	2	0	0	1	0	1	X	9
Japan (Enami) 🔨	0	0	2	0	1	1	0	2	0	X	6

Sheet D	1	2	3	4	5	6	7	8	9	10	Final
China (Jiang) 🔨	1	0	0	0	0	1	0	0	X	X	2
South Korea (Kim)	0	1	0	1	3	0	0	2	X	X	7

Sheet E	1	2	3	4	5	6	7	8	9	10	Final
Russia (Rumiantseva) 🔨	2	0	1	0	2	0	0	2	4	X	11
United States (Flannery)	0	0	0	1	0	3	2	0	0	X	6

==== Draw 4 ====
Tuesday, February 19, 9:00

Sheet A	1	2	3	4	5	6	7	8	9	10	Final
United States (Flannery)	0	0	1	0	1	0	3	0	1	X	6
South Korea (Kim) 🔨	0	2	0	2	0	4	0	1	0	X	9

Sheet B	1	2	3	4	5	6	7	8	9	10	Final
China (Jiang) 🔨	0	0	0	4	0	0	4	1	X	X	9
Japan (Enami)	0	1	0	0	1	1	0	0	X	X	3

Sheet C	1	2	3	4	5	6	7	8	9	10	Final
Switzerland (Keiser) 🔨	0	0	2	0	1	0	1	0	3	0	7
Russia (Rumiantseva)	0	0	0	1	0	2	0	1	0	2	6

Sheet D	1	2	3	4	5	6	7	8	9	10	Final
Norway (Ramsfjell)	1	0	0	1	0	0	1	0	1	1	5
Scotland (Davie) 🔨	0	2	0	0	1	1	0	0	0	0	4

Sheet E	1	2	3	4	5	6	7	8	9	10	Final
Canada (Sturmay) 🔨	1	0	0	1	0	0	1	X	X	X	3
Sweden (Sundberg)	0	2	2	0	4	1	0	X	X	X	9

==== Draw 5 ====
Tuesday, February 19, 19:00

Sheet A	1	2	3	4	5	6	7	8	9	10	Final
China (Jiang)	1	0	0	5	0	1	1	0	1	X	9
Russia (Rumiantseva) 🔨	0	2	1	0	1	0	0	3	0	X	7

Sheet B	1	2	3	4	5	6	7	8	9	10	Final
South Korea (Kim)	0	0	0	1	1	0	0	1	0	X	3
Canada (Sturmay) 🔨	1	1	2	0	0	0	1	0	3	X	8

Sheet C	1	2	3	4	5	6	7	8	9	10	Final
Scotland (Davie)	0	1	0	0	2	0	1	1	0	0	5
United States (Flannery) 🔨	0	0	1	3	0	1	0	0	1	1	7

Sheet D	1	2	3	4	5	6	7	8	9	10	Final
Sweden (Sundberg) 🔨	2	2	0	1	0	0	0	0	1	0	6
Switzerland (Keiser)	0	0	0	0	2	0	2	2	0	1	7

Sheet E	1	2	3	4	5	6	7	8	9	10	Final
Japan (Enami)	1	0	0	0	1	0	1	0	0	X	3
Norway (Ramsfjell) 🔨	0	1	1	2	0	2	0	1	1	X	8

==== Draw 6 ====
Wednesday, February 20, 14:00

Sheet A	1	2	3	4	5	6	7	8	9	10	Final
South Korea (Kim) 🔨	1	0	2	1	1	0	2	0	X	X	7
Norway (Ramsfjell)	0	1	0	0	0	1	0	1	X	X	3

Sheet B	1	2	3	4	5	6	7	8	9	10	Final
Russia (Rumiantseva)	0	0	1	0	1	1	0	0	4	X	7
Scotland (Davie) 🔨	0	1	0	1	0	0	1	1	0	X	4

Sheet C	1	2	3	4	5	6	7	8	9	10	Final
Japan (Enami) 🔨	2	0	0	0	0	2	0	2	X	X	6
Sweden (Sundberg)	0	4	1	1	5	0	1	0	X	X	12

Sheet D	1	2	3	4	5	6	7	8	9	10	Final
United States (Flannery) 🔨	2	0	1	0	1	0	2	0	2	0	8
China (Jiang)	0	2	0	2	0	2	0	2	0	1	9

Sheet E	1	2	3	4	5	6	7	8	9	10	Final
Switzerland (Keiser) 🔨	0	0	0	1	1	0	0	2	0	X	4
Canada (Sturmay)	0	0	2	0	0	2	1	0	1	X	6

==== Draw 7 ====
Thursday, February 21, 9:00

Sheet A	1	2	3	4	5	6	7	8	9	10	Final
Sweden (Sundberg)	3	0	1	1	3	0	0	0	2	X	10
United States (Flannery) 🔨	0	2	0	0	0	0	3	1	0	X	6

Sheet B	1	2	3	4	5	6	7	8	9	10	Final
Switzerland (Keiser)	0	1	0	1	0	0	0	0	0	X	2
China (Jiang) 🔨	0	0	2	0	2	1	1	1	1	X	8

Sheet C	1	2	3	4	5	6	7	8	9	10	Final
Norway (Ramsfjell)	0	0	0	1	0	0	0	1	X	X	2
Canada (Sturmay) 🔨	0	1	1	0	2	2	2	0	X	X	8

Sheet D	1	2	3	4	5	6	7	8	9	10	Final
South Korea (Kim) 🔨	5	0	0	0	1	0	0	0	1	0	7
Russia (Rumiantseva)	0	2	1	1	0	3	1	1	0	1	10

Sheet E	1	2	3	4	5	6	7	8	9	10	Final
Scotland (Davie) 🔨	0	2	0	0	1	0	0	1	X	X	4
Japan (Enami)	2	0	3	2	0	2	1	0	X	X	10

==== Draw 8 ====
Thursday, February 21, 19:00

Sheet A	1	2	3	4	5	6	7	8	9	10	11	Final
Canada (Sturmay)	0	1	0	0	2	0	3	0	0	1	0	7
China (Jiang) 🔨	1	0	0	2	0	2	0	1	1	0	1	8

Sheet B	1	2	3	4	5	6	7	8	9	10	Final
Japan (Enami) 🔨	0	0	1	0	1	0	1	0	3	0	6
South Korea (Kim)	1	1	0	2	0	1	0	1	0	1	7

Sheet C	1	2	3	4	5	6	7	8	9	10	Final
United States (Flannery) 🔨	1	0	0	0	3	0	0	0	0	X	4
Switzerland (Keiser)	0	1	1	1	0	0	1	1	1	X	6

Sheet D	1	2	3	4	5	6	7	8	9	10	Final
Scotland (Davie) 🔨	1	0	0	2	0	0	1	0	0	2	6
Sweden (Sundberg)	0	1	1	0	1	2	0	1	1	0	7

Sheet E	1	2	3	4	5	6	7	8	9	10	Final
Norway (Ramsfjell) 🔨	1	0	1	0	0	0	0	1	0	X	3
Russia (Rumiantseva)	0	3	0	0	2	1	1	0	3	X	10

==== Draw 9 ====
Friday, February 22, 13:30

Sheet A	1	2	3	4	5	6	7	8	9	10	Final
Japan (Enami) 🔨	1	1	1	0	2	0	0	2	1	0	8
Switzerland (Keiser)	0	0	0	3	0	2	1	0	0	1	7

Sheet B	1	2	3	4	5	6	7	8	9	10	Final
United States (Flannery) 🔨	0	1	0	0	2	1	0	0	1	X	5
Norway (Ramsfjell)	0	0	2	3	0	0	2	2	0	X	9

Sheet C	1	2	3	4	5	6	7	8	9	10	Final
Sweden (Sundberg) 🔨	1	0	3	0	1	0	0	0	0	X	5
South Korea (Kim)	0	2	0	2	0	3	2	2	1	X	12

Sheet D	1	2	3	4	5	6	7	8	9	10	Final
Russia (Rumiantseva)	0	0	1	0	1	0	1	0	0	X	3
Canada (Sturmay) 🔨	1	1	0	1	0	2	0	1	2	X	8

Sheet E	1	2	3	4	5	6	7	8	9	10	Final
China (Jiang) 🔨	0	1	2	2	0	1	0	2	2	X	10
Scotland (Davie)	1	0	0	0	1	0	4	0	0	X	6

=== Playoffs ===
Semifinal
1	China	6
4	Russia	8
2	Canada	8
3	Switzerland	2

Final
4	Russia	8
2	Canada	7

Bronze-medal game
1	China	4
3	Switzerland	6

==== Semifinal ====
Friday, February 22, 19:30

Sheet A	1	2	3	4	5	6	7	8	9	10	Final
China (Jiang) 🔨	0	1	0	2	0	1	0	1	1	0	6
Russia (Rumiantseva)	2	0	1	0	3	0	1	0	0	1	8

Sheet B	1	2	3	4	5	6	7	8	9	10	Final
Canada (Sturmay) 🔨	0	2	0	1	0	2	0	1	2	X	8
Switzerland (Keiser)	0	0	0	0	1	0	1	0	0	X	2

==== Bronze-medal game ====
Saturday, February 23, 15:00

Sheet D	1	2	3	4	5	6	7	8	9	10	Final
China (Jiang) 🔨	0	1	0	1	0	1	0	1	0	0	4
Switzerland (Keiser)	0	0	1	0	1	0	1	0	1	2	6

==== Final ====
Saturday, February 23, 15:00

Sheet C	1	2	3	4	5	6	7	8	9	10	11	Final
Russia (Rumiantseva)	0	0	1	0	2	1	0	1	0	2	1	8
Canada (Sturmay) 🔨	0	2	0	1	0	0	1	0	3	0	0	7
