= Jørgen Myran =

Norwegian curler (born 1998)

- Curler ♂
- Born: 24 April 1998 (age 28); Oppdal Municipality, Norway

Team
- Curling club: Oppdal CK, Oppdal

Curling career
- Member Association: Norway
- World Championship: 1 (2019)
- Other appearances: World Junior Championships: 2 (2018, 2019)
Medal record
Curling
Norwegian Men's Championship
Gold medal – first place	2019 Haugesund
Bronze medal – third place	2018 Lillehammer

Jørgen Myran (born 24 April 1998 in Oppdal Municipality) is a Norwegian curler from Trondheim.

At the national level, he is a 2019 Norwegian men's champion curler.

== Teams ==
=== Men's ===
Season	Skip	Third	Second	Lead	Alternate	Coach	Events
2015–16	Jörgen Myran	Andreas Hårstad	Emil M. Kvål	Stig Morten Myran			NMCC 2016 (6th)
2016–17	Jörgen Myran	Jakob Haugland	Harald Skarsheim Rian	Jon Aunoeien	Emil M. Kvål, Sander V. Vindal		NMCC 2017 (9th)
2017–18	Magnus Ramsfjell	Kristian Foss	Michael Mellemseter	Andreas Hårstad	Jörgen Myran	Stein Mellemseter	WJCC 2018 (6th); NMCC 2018 (bronze)
2018–19	Magnus Ramsfjell	Michael Mellemseter	Andreas Hårstad	Jörgen Myran			NMCC 2019 (gold)
2018–19	Magnus Ramsfjell	Michael Mellemseter	Jörgen Myran	Andreas Hårstad	Ingebrigt Bjørnstad (WJCC); Steffen Walstad (WCC)	Stein Mellemseter	WJCC 2019 (4th); WCC 2019 (12th)

=== Mixed ===
Season	Skip	Third	Second	Lead	Events
2016–17	Jørgen Myran	Malin Granli-Øiamo	Andreas Hårstad	Sara Holmen	NMxCC 2017 (5th)

== Personal life ==
He started curling in 2008 at the age of 10.
