= Bendik Ramsfjell =

Norwegian curler (born 1996)

- Curler
- Born: 4 March 1996 (age 30); Oslo, Norway

Team
- Curling club: Trondheim CK, Trondheim, NOR
- Skip: Magnus Ramsfjell
- Third: Steffen Walstad
- Second: Bendik Ramsfjell
- Lead: Mathias Brænden

Curling career
- Member Association: Norway
- World Championship: 4 (2022, 2023, 2024, 2025)
- European Championship: 4 (2023, 2024, 2025, 2026)
- Olympic: 1 (2026)
Medal record
Curling
Representing Norway
European Championships
Bronze medal – third place	2024 Lohja
World Junior Championships
Bronze medal – third place	2017 Pyeongchang
Winter Universiade
Gold medal – first place	2019 Krasnoyarsk
Norwegian Men's Championships
Gold medal – first place	2020 Oslo
Gold medal – first place	2022 Trondheim
Gold medal – first place	2023 Oppdal
Gold medal – first place	2026 Lillehammer
Silver medal – second place	2025 Halden
Bronze medal – third place	2017 Lillehammer
Bronze medal – third place	2024 Oslo

Bendik Ramsfjell (born 4 March 1996) is a Norwegian curler. He plays second on the three-time Norwegian championship Magnus Ramsfjell team from Trondheim.

== Curling career ==
=== Juniors ===
Ramsfjell was the third on the Norwegian junior men's team at the 2016 and 2017 World Junior Curling Championships on teams skipped by his cousin Magnus. At the 2016 World Juniors, the team finished 5th, with a 5–4 round robin record, missing the playoffs. At the 2017 World Juniors, the team improved to a 6-3 round robin record, which put them in a tiebreaker game against Canada's Tyler Tardi rink for the final playoff spot. They beat Canada in the tiebreaker game, but lost to Scotland's Cameron Bryce in the 3 vs. 4 game. This put them in the bronze medal game, where they faced Scotland again. This time, they would beat the Scots to claim the bronze medal. Also in 2017, the team won a bronze medal at the Norwegian Men's Curling Championship.

=== Men's ===
In 2019, Ramsfjell played second on Team Norway at the 2019 Winter Universiade, on a team skipped by Magnus Ramsfjell. The team went on to win the gold medal.

The Magnus Ramsfjell rink, with Bendik throwing lead stones won the 2020 Norwegian men's championship. The team won the Norwegian championship again in 2022 with Magnus throwing second stones. The team was chosen to represent Norway at the 2022 World Men's Curling Championship, where they finished in 10th with a 5–7 record. That season, the team also won the 2021 Prague Classic World Curling Tour event.

During the 2022–23 curling season, the team won the Norwegian men's championship again and won the 2022 Curling Masters Champéry World Curling Tour event. They also played in the 2022 Masters and 2023 Canadian Open Grand Slam of Curling events. They made it to the semifinals of the Masters and failed to qualify for the playoffs in the Canadian Open. The team was chosen to represent Norway once again at the 2023 World Men's Curling Championship, where they went 10–2 in the round robin. This put the team in the playoffs, where they lost to Italy (skipped by Joël Retornaz) in the qualification game. The following week, the team played in the 2023 Players' Championship, where they went 2–3, missing the playoffs. Team Ramsfjell would win their first men's international medal at the 2024 European Curling Championships, where they would finish round-robin play with a 6–3 record and after losing in the semifinals, would beat Switzerland's Yannick Schwaller 7–4 to win the bronze medal.

Team Ramsfjell would represent Norway at the 2026 Winter Olympics, where they would qualify for the playoffs after finishing round robin with a 5–4 record. However, they would lose to Canada's Brad Jacobs in the semifinals and Switzerland's Yannick Schwaller 9–1 in the bronze medal game to finish in 4th place.

== Personal life ==
Ramsfjell was born in Oslo and lives in Trondheim. His father is Olympic gold medallist curler, Bent Anund Ramsfjell. He is employed as a city planner.
