= Markus Høiberg =

Norwegian curler (born 1991)

- Curler
- Born: Markus Snøve Høiberg; 6 June 1991 (age 35); Oppdal Municipality, Norway

Team
- Curling club: Oppdal CK, Oppdal
- Skip: Steffen Walstad
- Third: Torger Nergård
- Second: Markus Høiberg
- Lead: Magnus Vågberg
- Alternate: Magnus Nedregotten

Curling career
- Member Association: Norway
- World Championship: 8 (2011, 2013, 2014, 2015, 2016, 2017, 2018, 2021)
- European Championship: 5 (2010, 2013, 2018, 2019, 2021)
- Olympic: 3 (2014, 2018, 2022)
Medal record
Men's curling
Representing Norway
World Championships
Gold medal – first place	2014 Beijing
Silver medal – second place	2015 Halifax
European Championships
Gold medal – first place	2010 Champéry
Silver medal – second place	2013 Stavanger
World Junior Championships
Bronze medal – third place	2011 Perth

Markus Snøve Høiberg (born 6 June 1991) is a Norwegian curler from Oslo. He was born in Oppdal Municipality. He competed at the 2014 Winter Olympics in Sochi as the alternate for the Norwegian men's team. He won a gold medal at the 2014 World Men's Curling Championship as a member of the team.

Høiberg currently plays second for the Steffen Walstad rink on the World Curling Tour.

== Personal life ==
Høiberg works as a financial risk analyst.
