= Thomas Due =

Norwegian curler

Medal record

Curling

World Championships
Bronze medal – third place	2006 Lowell	
Bronze medal – third place	2008 Grand Forks	

World Junior Championships
Bronze medal – third place	1988 Füssen	

European Championships
Silver medal – second place	2007 Füssen	
Silver medal – second place	2008 Örnsköldsvik	
Bronze medal – third place	2002 Grindelwald	

Thomas Due (born 14 March 1971) is a Norwegian curler.

Thomas Due is a Norwegian business man and former curling player. He was part of the Norwegian National Curling team since he was a junior. Altogether he holds 6 Norwegian Championship Gold Medals. The last one in 2007 after winning 11 straight games during the Norwegian Championships in Skien, Norway.

- Norwegian Championship Gold: 1998, 2000, 2003, 2004, 2006, 2007
- In his first World Junior Curling Championships, playing with skip Thomas Ulsrud he got a bronze medal in 1988. He played two more WJCC in 1991 and 1992 where he skipped his own team.
- In 1997, he curled in his first European Curling Championships where his team finished in seventh. He returned in 2000, 2002 2003 and 2006 - winning bronze in 2002.
- In 1998 Thomas Due curled in his first World Curling Championships in Kamloops, Canada - to a 5th-place finish. At the 2006 World Men's Curling Championship, he made the playoffs for the first time, and defeated team USA to win the bronze medal. At the 2007 world curling championships in Edmonton, Canada the Norwegian team finished in 7th place.

== Teammates up until 2007 ==
- Thomas Ulsrud (skip)
- Torger Nergård (third)
- Thomas Due (second)
- Jan Thoresen (lead)
- Christoffer Svae (alternate)
- Johan Hoestmaelingen(alternate)

== Teammates 2007 - 2008 ==
- In 2007 Thomas Due played with Jan Thoresen, Tormod Andreasen and Kjell Berg. The team played on the World Curling Tour Europe.
- Tormod Andreasen (skip)
- Thomas Due (third)
- Kjell Berg (second)
- Jan Thoresen (lead)

== Teammates 2008 - 2009 ==
- In 2008 Thomas Due started a new team together with Oystein and Hallvard Soerum, Magnus Nedregotten and Sander Roelvaag. The team played on the World Curling Tour Europe.
- Øystein Sørum (skip)
- Thomas Due (third)
- Hallvard Sørum (second)
- Magnus Nedregotten (lead)
- Sander Rølvaag (lead)
