= Steffen Walstad =

Norwegian curler

- Curler
- Steffen Walstad at 2026 European Curling Championships
- Born: 10 February 1989 (age 37); Trondheim, Norway

Team
- Curling club: Oppdal CK, Oppdal, NOR
- Skip: Magnus Ramsfjell
- Third: Steffen Walstad
- Second: Bendik Ramsfjell
- Lead: Mathias Brænden

Curling career
- Member Association: Norway
- World Championship: 4 (2017, 2018, 2019, 2021)
- World Mixed Championship: 2 (2015, 2023)
- European Championship: 5 (2018, 2019, 2021, 2022, 2026)
- Olympic: 1 (2022)
Medal record
Curling
Representing Norway
World Mixed Championship
| Gold medal – first place | 2015 Bern |
European Mixed Championship
| Silver medal – second place | 2014 Copenhagen |
Winter Universiade
| Gold medal – first place | 2015 Granada |
| Bronze medal – third place | 2017 Almaty |
Norwegian Men's Championships
| Gold medal – first place | 2016 Stavanger |
| Gold medal – first place | 2017 Lillehammer |
| Gold medal – first place | 2018 Lillehammer |
| Gold medal – first place | 2024 Oslo |
| Silver medal – second place | 2020 Oslo |
| Silver medal – second place | 2022 Trondheim |
| Bronze medal – third place | 2023 Oppdal |
| Bronze medal – third place | 2025 Halden |

Steffen Walstad (born 10 February 1989 in Oppdal Municipality) is a Norwegian curler from Oppdal. He currently plays third on Team Magnus Ramsfjell.

== Career ==
=== Juniors ===
Walstad played in three World Junior Curling Championships, from 2008 to 2010 inclusive. At the 2008 World Junior Curling Championships, he played third for the Kristian Rolvsfjord rink, finishing in 4th place. He played second for the team at the 2009 World Junior Curling Championships, finishing in 5th place. And at the 2010 World Junior Curling Championships, he played second for the Steffen Mellemseter, finishing 5th overall.

Walstad has played in four Winter Universiades; playing in the 2011 Winter Universiade, he played third for Markus Høiberg, finishing 7th. The team represented Norway again at the 2013 Winter Universiade, where they improved to a fourth place finish. At the 2015 Winter Universiade, Walstad skipped the University of Oslo rink to a gold medal, defeating Russia's Evgeny Arkhipov in the final. Walstad again skipped Norway at the 2017 Winter Universiade, where he won a bronze medal.

=== Men's ===
Walstad won three Norwegian men's championships in 2016, 2017 and 2018. His 2017 win included a best-of-three playoff against perennial Norwegian national team skip Thomas Ulsrud to represent Norway at the World Championships, which they won, earning Walstad a right to represent Norway at the 2017 Ford World Men's Curling Championship. On the World Curling Tour that season, Walstad won his first career event at the 2017 German Masters.

To start the 2017–18 curling season, Walstad played in his first Grand Slam event, the 2017 GSOC Tour Challenge. Despite it only being his first Slam, his team did well, going all the way to the final, undefeated, before losing to Brad Gushue. Later in the year, Waldstad skipped Norway at the 2018 World Men's Curling Championship, leading the team to a 7–6 finish in 5th place.

Walstad began the 2018–19 curling season in the first leg of the Curling World Cup, where he lost in the final to Canada's Kevin Koe. The following month, the Walstad rink played in their second slam, the 2018 Masters. There he was less fortunate, losing all of his games. In November, the team played in the 2018 European Curling Championships, where Waldstad led Norway to a 5–4 record in fifth place. In the New Year, the team played in the third leg of the Curling World Cup, where they had less success, finishing in 6th. Later in the season, Walstad was named as the alternate on the Norwegian team, skipped by Magnus Ramsfjell at the 2019 World Men's Curling Championship. The team finished in 12th place.

Walstad represented Norway again at the 2019 European Curling Championships. He led his country to another 5–4 record and a sixth place finish. There would be no World Championships in 2020 due to the COVID-19 pandemic, but Walstad would represent Norway at the 2021 World Men's Curling Championship, which was played in a bubble with no spectators. He led Norway to a 7–6 record, in 8th place.

=== Mixed curling ===
Walstad has found much success in mixed curling. He has skipped Norway twice at the European Mixed Curling Championship and once at its successor tournament, the World Mixed Curling Championship. He led Norway to a 5th place finish at the 2012 European Mixed Curling Championship. He found more success at the 2014 European Mixed Curling Championship, where he would lead his rink of Kristin Moen Skaslien, Magnus Nedregotten and Julie Kjær Molnar to a silver medal finish, after losing to Sweden in the final. He succeeded even more at the 2015 World Mixed Curling Championship. There he led his team of Molnar, Sander Rølvåg and Pia Trulsen to a gold medal.

== Personal life ==
Walstad is employed as a photographer.

== Grand Slam record ==
Key
| C | Champion |
| F | Lost in Final |
| SF | Lost in Semifinal |
| QF | Lost in Quarterfinals |
| R16 | Lost in the round of 16 |
| Q | Did not advance to playoffs |
| T2 | Played in Tier 2 event |
| DNP | Did not participate in event |
| N/A | Not a Grand Slam event that season |

| Event | 2017–18 | 2018–19 | 2019–20 | 2020–21 | 2021–22 | 2022–23 | 2023–24 | 2024–25 | 2025–26 | 2026–27 |
|---|---|---|---|---|---|---|---|---|---|---|
| Invitational | F | DNP | DNP | N/A | N/A | Q | DNP | DNP | DNP | F |
| Masters | DNP | Q | DNP | N/A | DNP | DNP | DNP | DNP | DNP | DNP |
