= 2022 Euro Super Series =

- Host city: Stirling, Scotland
- Arena: National Curling Academy
- Dates: 18–21 August (Women's); 25–28 August (Men's)
- Men's winner: (Italy) Team Retornaz
- Curling club: Trentino Curling, Cembra
- Skip: Joël Retornaz
- Third: Amos Mosaner
- Second: Sebastiano Arman
- Lead: Mattia Giovanella
- Finalist: (United States) Korey Dropkin
- Women's winner: (Germany) Team Jentsch
- Curling club: CC Füssen, Füssen
- Skip: Daniela Jentsch
- Third: Emira Abbes
- Second: Mia Höhne
- Lead: Analena Jentsch
- Finalist: (Norway) Team Rørvik

The 2022 Euro Super Series was a curling event among various countries of Europe. It held from 18 to 28 August at the National Curling Academy in Stirling, Scotland. The women's event ran from 18 to 21 August and the men's event went from 25 to 28 August. The total purse for the event was £ 20,000 on both the men's and women's sides.

In the men's event, Italy's Joël Retornaz rink, with Amos Mosaner, Sebastiano Arman and Mattia Giovanella defeated the United States' Korey Dropkin 9–3 in the championship final. Team Retornaz qualified for the playoffs through the A side with three straight victories and continued their momentum into the playoff round. Team Dropkin went 3–2 in the preliminary stage and qualified through the C side before winning both their quarterfinal and semifinal matches. Retornaz defeated Scotland's Cameron Bryce 6–2 in the semifinal while Dropkin fended off the Netherlands Wouter Gösgens 6–4. Ross Whyte, Steffen Walstad, John Shuster and James Craik all qualified for the quarterfinals.

In the women's event, Germany's Daniela Jentsch squad, also consisting of Emira Abbes, Mia Höhne and Analena Jentsch stole four straight singles in the final to knock off Norway's Marianne Rørvik rink, which was being skipped by Maia Ramsfjell 5–3. Team Jentsch went 3–1 through the round robin to earn a bye to the semifinal while Team Rørvik went 5–0, also qualifying for the semifinals. There, Team Rørvik won 7–5 over Switzerland's Michèle Jäggi while Team Jentsch secured a 7–3 win over Switzerland's Raphaela Keiser. The women's playoff bracket was rounded out by Norway's Eirin Mesloe and Italy's Stefania Constantini who both lost in the quarterfinal round. All four of the Scottish women's rinks competing failed to qualify for the playoffs.

== Men ==
=== Teams ===
The teams are listed as follows:

Skip	Third	Second	Lead	Alternate	Locale
Michael Brunner	Romano Meier	Anthony Petoud	Marcel Käufeler		Bern, Switzerland
Cameron Bryce	Duncan Menzies	Luke Carson	Robin McCall		Stirling, Scotland
James Craik	Mark Watt	Angus Bryce	Blair Haswell		Stirling, Scotland
Ross Craik	Scott Hyslop	Struan Carson	Jack Carrick		Stirling, Scotland
Korey Dropkin	Andrew Stopera	Mark Fenner	Thomas Howell		(United States) Duluth, Minnesota
Wouter Gösgens	Jaap van Dorp	Laurens Hoekman	Tobias van den Hurk	Alexander Magan	Zoetermeer, Netherlands
Grunde Buraas (Fourth)	Lukas Høstmælingen (Skip)	Magnus Lillebø	Tinius Haslev Nordbye		Oslo, Norway
Jeong Byeong-jin	Lee Jeong-jae	Kim Min-woo	Kim Tae-hwan	Lee Dong-hyeong	Seoul, South Korea
Joël Retornaz	Amos Mosaner	Sebastiano Arman	Mattia Giovanella		Trentino, Italy
Andrin Schnider	Nicola Stoll	Noé Traub	Tom Winklehausen		Schaffhausen, Switzerland
John Shuster	Chris Plys	Matt Hamilton	Colin Hufman (Note: Colin Hufman spared for John Landsteiner.)		(United States) Duluth, Minnesota
Jan Hess (Fourth)	Yves Stocker (Skip)	Simon Gloor	Felix Eberhard		Zug, Switzerland
Jack Strawhorn	Hamish Gallacher	Kaleb Johnston	Rory Macnair		Dumfries, Scotland
Kyle Waddell	Craig Waddell	Mark Taylor	Gavin Barr		Glasgow, Scotland
Steffen Walstad	Magnus Nedregotten	Mathias Brænden	Magnus Vågberg		Oppdal, Norway
Ross Whyte	Robin Brydone	Duncan McFadzean	Euan Kyle		Stirling, Scotland

=== Knockout brackets ===
==== A event ====
A Event	Qualifier 1
1	(Italy) Joël Retornaz	6
1	(Scotland) Jack Strawhorn	1	9	(Italy) Joël Retornaz	9
2	(Scotland) Cameron Bryce	2	9	(Scotland) Kyle Waddell	2
2	(Scotland) Kyle Waddell	7	13	(Italy) Joël Retornaz	6
3	(Switzerland) Yves Stocker	5	13	(United States) John Shuster	5
3	(Scotland) James Craik	8	10	(Scotland) James Craik	4
4	(United States) John Shuster	6	10	(United States) John Shuster	8
4	(Switzerland) Andrin Schnider	1

A Event	Qualifier 2
5	(Switzerland) Michael Brunner	5
5	(South Korea) Jeong Byeong-jin	4	11	(Switzerland) Michael Brunner	6
6	(United States) Korey Dropkin	5	11	(Norway) Lukas Høstmælingen	5
6	(Norway) Lukas Høstmælingen	7	14	(Switzerland) Michael Brunner	3
7	(Norway) Steffen Walstad	6	14	(Scotland) Ross Whyte	7
7	(Netherlands) Wouter Gösgens	4	12	(Norway) Steffen Walstad	3
8	(Scotland) Ross Whyte	7	12	(Scotland) Ross Whyte	5
8	(Scotland) Ross Craik	5

==== B event ====
B Event						Qualifier 3
15	(Scotland) Jack Strawhorn	4
15	(Scotland) Cameron Bryce	7	19	(Scotland) Cameron Bryce	8
16	(Switzerland) Yves Stocker	6	19	(Switzerland) Andrin Schnider	7
16	(Switzerland) Andrin Schnider	7				23	(Scotland) Cameron Bryce	8
						23	(Switzerland) Michael Brunner	1

B Event						Qualifier 4
17	(South Korea) Jeong Byeong-jin	2
17	(United States) Korey Dropkin	7	20	(United States) Korey Dropkin	4
18	(Netherlands) Wouter Gösgens	9	20	(Netherlands) Wouter Gösgens	7
18	(Scotland) Ross Craik	2				24	(Netherlands) Wouter Gösgens	1
						24	(United States) John Shuster	6

B Event			Qualifier 5
21	(Scotland) Kyle Waddell	7
21	(Scotland) James Craik	5	25	(Scotland) Kyle Waddell	4
22	(Norway) Lukas Høstmælingen	8	25	(Norway) Steffen Walstad	6
22	(Norway) Steffen Walstad	10

==== C event ====
C Event						Qualifier 6
26	(Scotland) Jack Strawhorn	2
26	(Switzerland) Yves Stocker	8	28	(Switzerland) Yves Stocker	5
			28	(Norway) Lukas Høstmælingen	6
						31	(Norway) Lukas Høstmælingen	1
						31	(Netherlands) Wouter Gösgens	6

C Event						Qualifier 7
27	(South Korea) Jeong Byeong-jin	7
27	(Scotland) Ross Craik	4	29	(South Korea) Jeong Byeong-jin	3
			29	(Scotland) James Craik	10
						32	(Scotland) James Craik	4
						32	(Switzerland) Michael Brunner	3

C Event			Qualifier 8
30	(Switzerland) Andrin Schnider	3
30	(United States) Korey Dropkin	4	33	(United States) Korey Dropkin	5
			33	(Scotland) Kyle Waddell	3

=== Knockout results ===
All draw times are listed in British Summer Time (UTC+01:00).

==== Draw 1 ====
Thursday, 25 August, 4:30 pm

Sheet A	1	2	3	4	5	6	7	8	Final
(Italy) Joël Retornaz 🔨	3	0	1	0	0	1	1	X	6
(Scotland) Jack Strawhorn	0	0	0	0	1	0	0	X	1

Sheet B	1	2	3	4	5	6	7	8	Final
(United States) Korey Dropkin	0	0	1	0	0	2	2	0	5
(Norway) Lukas Høstmælingen 🔨	1	1	0	1	1	0	0	3	7

Sheet C	1	2	3	4	5	6	7	8	Final
(Switzerland) Yves Stocker	0	2	0	0	2	0	1	X	5
(Scotland) James Craik 🔨	2	0	2	1	0	3	0	X	8

Sheet D	1	2	3	4	5	6	7	8	Final
(United States) John Shuster	0	0	2	1	1	2	X	X	6
(Switzerland) Andrin Schnider 🔨	0	1	0	0	0	0	X	X	1

==== Draw 2 ====
Thursday, 25 August, 8:30 pm

Sheet A	1	2	3	4	5	6	7	8	Final
(Switzerland) Michael Brunner	0	0	0	2	0	3	0	X	5
(South Korea) Jeong Byeong-jin 🔨	0	0	2	0	1	0	1	X	4

Sheet B	1	2	3	4	5	6	7	8	Final
(Scotland) Cameron Bryce	0	0	1	0	1	0	0	X	2
(Scotland) Kyle Waddell 🔨	1	3	0	1	0	1	1	X	7

Sheet C	1	2	3	4	5	6	7	8	Final
(Norway) Steffen Walstad	0	3	0	1	0	1	0	1	6
(Netherlands) Wouter Gösgens 🔨	0	0	1	0	1	0	2	0	4

Sheet D	1	2	3	4	5	6	7	8	Final
(Scotland) Ross Whyte 🔨	3	0	0	0	2	1	0	1	7
(Scotland) Ross Craik	0	1	2	1	0	0	1	0	5

==== Draw 3 ====
Friday, 26 August 8:30 am

Sheet A	1	2	3	4	5	6	7	8	Final
(Netherlands) Wouter Gösgens 🔨	0	3	1	1	0	0	4	X	9
(Scotland) Ross Craik	1	0	0	0	0	1	0	X	2

Sheet B	1	2	3	4	5	6	7	8	Final
(Switzerland) Yves Stocker	0	0	1	0	1	2	2	0	6
(Switzerland) Andrin Schnider 🔨	2	1	0	2	0	0	0	2	7

Sheet C	1	2	3	4	5	6	7	8	Final
(South Korea) Jeong Byeong-jin	0	1	0	1	0	0	X	X	2
(United States) Korey Dropkin 🔨	1	0	2	0	2	2	X	X	7

Sheet D	1	2	3	4	5	6	7	8	Final
(Scotland) Jack Strawhorn 🔨	2	0	0	1	0	1	0	X	4
(Scotland) Cameron Bryce	0	3	1	0	2	0	1	X	7

==== Draw 4 ====
Friday, 26 August, 12:30 pm

Sheet A	1	2	3	4	5	6	7	8	Final
(Norway) Steffen Walstad 🔨	0	0	0	0	0	2	1	0	3
(Scotland) Ross Whyte	0	0	0	3	1	0	0	1	5

Sheet B	1	2	3	4	5	6	7	8	Final
(Scotland) James Craik	0	0	0	0	2	0	2	0	4
(United States) John Shuster 🔨	0	1	3	0	0	2	0	2	8

Sheet C	1	2	3	4	5	6	7	8	Final
(Switzerland) Michael Brunner 🔨	1	0	1	1	0	2	0	1	6
(Norway) Lukas Høstmælingen	0	2	0	0	2	0	1	0	5

Sheet D	1	2	3	4	5	6	7	8	Final
(Italy) Joël Retornaz 🔨	2	0	0	3	1	1	2	X	9
(Scotland) Kyle Waddell	0	0	2	0	0	0	0	X	2

==== Draw 5 ====
Friday, 26 August, 4:30 pm

Sheet A	1	2	3	4	5	6	7	8	Final
(Scotland) Cameron Bryce 🔨	1	0	4	0	1	1	0	1	8
(Switzerland) Andrin Schnider	0	1	0	3	0	0	3	0	7

Sheet B	1	2	3	4	5	6	7	8	Final
(United States) Korey Dropkin	0	0	1	0	1	1	1	0	4
(Netherlands) Wouter Gösgens 🔨	4	1	0	1	0	0	0	1	7

Sheet C	1	2	3	4	5	6	7	8	Final
(Scotland) Kyle Waddell 🔨	0	3	0	2	0	2	0	0	7
(Scotland) James Craik	1	0	1	0	2	0	0	1	5

Sheet D	1	2	3	4	5	6	7	8	Final
(Norway) Lukas Høstmælingen	2	1	0	0	4	0	1	0	8
(Norway) Steffen Walstad 🔨	0	0	3	2	0	2	0	3	10

==== Draw 6 ====
Friday, 26 August, 8:30 pm

Sheet A	1	2	3	4	5	6	7	8	Final
(Scotland) Jack Strawhorn	0	0	1	0	1	X	X	X	2
(Switzerland) Yves Stocker 🔨	3	4	0	1	0	X	X	X	8

Sheet B	1	2	3	4	5	6	7	8	Final
(Switzerland) Michael Brunner	0	0	0	2	0	1	X	X	3
(Scotland) Ross Whyte 🔨	0	3	2	0	2	0	X	X	7

Sheet C	1	2	3	4	5	6	7	8	9	Final
(Italy) Joël Retornaz	1	0	0	2	1	0	1	0	1	6
(United States) John Shuster 🔨	0	0	1	0	0	1	0	3	0	5

Sheet D	1	2	3	4	5	6	7	8	Final
(South Korea) Jeong Byeong-jin	0	4	1	0	1	0	1	X	7
(Scotland) Ross Craik 🔨	1	0	0	1	0	2	0	X	4

==== Draw 7 ====
Saturday, 27 August, 8:30 am

Sheet B	1	2	3	4	5	6	7	8	Final
(South Korea) Jeong Byeong-jin	0	1	0	1	1	0	X	X	3
(Scotland) James Craik 🔨	1	0	6	0	0	3	X	X	10

Sheet C	1	2	3	4	5	6	7	8	Final
(Switzerland) Yves Stocker	0	1	0	0	0	4	0	0	5
(Norway) Lukas Høstmælingen 🔨	2	0	0	0	2	0	1	1	6

Sheet D	1	2	3	4	5	6	7	8	Final
(Switzerland) Andrin Schnider 🔨	0	1	0	0	0	1	0	1	3
(United States) Korey Dropkin	0	0	1	2	1	0	0	0	4

==== Draw 8 ====
Saturday, 27 August, 12:30 pm

Sheet A	1	2	3	4	5	6	7	8	Final
(Netherlands) Wouter Gösgens	0	0	1	0	0	0	X	X	1
(United States) John Shuster 🔨	3	0	0	0	0	3	X	X	6

Sheet B	1	2	3	4	5	6	7	8	Final
(Scotland) Kyle Waddell	0	0	2	0	2	0	0	0	4
(Norway) Steffen Walstad 🔨	1	1	0	1	0	2	0	1	6

Sheet D	1	2	3	4	5	6	7	8	Final
(Scotland) Cameron Bryce 🔨	2	1	0	2	1	2	X	X	8
(Switzerland) Michael Brunner	0	0	1	0	0	0	X	X	1

==== Draw 9 ====
Saturday, 27 August, 4:30 pm

Sheet A	1	2	3	4	5	6	7	8	Final
(United States) Korey Dropkin 🔨	0	1	0	0	2	1	0	1	5
(Scotland) Kyle Waddell	0	0	1	0	0	0	2	0	3

Sheet C	1	2	3	4	5	6	7	8	Final
(Scotland) James Craik	0	1	0	1	0	1	0	1	4
(Switzerland) Michael Brunner 🔨	0	0	1	0	1	0	1	0	3

Sheet D	1	2	3	4	5	6	7	8	Final
(Norway) Lukas Høstmælingen	0	0	0	1	0	0	0	X	1
(Netherlands) Wouter Gösgens 🔨	2	0	1	0	1	1	1	X	6

=== Playoffs ===
Quarterfinals
A1	(Italy) Joël Retornaz	6
C2	(Scotland) James Craik	4
B2	(United States) John Shuster	1
B1	(Scotland) Cameron Bryce	7
A2	(Scotland) Ross Whyte	4
C1	(Netherlands) Wouter Gösgens	6
B3	(Norway) Steffen Walstad	5
C3	(United States) Korey Dropkin	6

Semifinals
A1	(Italy) Joël Retornaz	6
B1	(Scotland) Cameron Bryce	2
C1	(Netherlands) Wouter Gösgens	4
C3	(United States) Korey Dropkin	6

Final
A1	(Italy) Joël Retornaz	9
C3	(United States) Korey Dropkin	3

==== Quarterfinals ====
Saturday, 27 August, 8:30 pm

Sheet A	1	2	3	4	5	6	7	8	Final
(Italy) Joël Retornaz 🔨	0	0	2	0	0	3	0	1	6
(Scotland) James Craik	0	1	0	1	1	0	1	0	4

Sheet B	1	2	3	4	5	6	7	8	Final
(United States) John Shuster 🔨	0	1	0	0	0	0	X	X	1
(Scotland) Cameron Bryce	0	0	1	2	2	2	X	X	7

Sheet C	1	2	3	4	5	6	7	8	Final
(Scotland) Ross Whyte 🔨	0	1	1	0	2	0	0	0	4
(Netherlands) Wouter Gösgens	2	0	0	1	0	1	0	2	6

Sheet D	1	2	3	4	5	6	7	8	9	Final
(Norway) Steffen Walstad 🔨	0	1	1	0	0	1	0	2	0	5
(United States) Korey Dropkin	1	0	0	1	1	0	2	0	1	6

==== Semifinals ====
Sunday, 28 August, 8:30 am

Sheet A	1	2	3	4	5	6	7	8	Final
(Italy) Joël Retornaz 🔨	4	0	0	1	1	0	X	X	6
(Scotland) Cameron Bryce	0	1	0	0	0	1	X	X	2

Sheet B	1	2	3	4	5	6	7	8	Final
(Netherlands) Wouter Gösgens	0	0	0	2	0	2	0	X	4
(United States) Korey Dropkin 🔨	0	2	1	0	1	0	2	X	6

==== Final ====
Sunday, 28 August, 12:30 pm

Sheet B	1	2	3	4	5	6	7	8	Final
(Italy) Joël Retornaz 🔨	1	0	5	1	0	2	X	X	9
(United States) Korey Dropkin	0	1	0	0	2	0	X	X	3

== Women ==
=== Teams ===
The teams are listed as follows:

Skip	Third	Second	Lead	Alternate	Locale
Lucy Blair	Alexandra MacKintosh	Holly Hamilton	Susie Smith	Lisa Davie	Stirling, Scotland
Stefania Constantini	Marta Lo Deserto	Angela Romei	Giulia Zardini Lacedelli		Cortina d'Ampezzo, Italy
Beth Farmer	Hailey Duff	Kirstin Bousie	Katie McMillan	Amy MacDonald	Stirling, Scotland
Fay Henderson	Holly Wilkie-Milne	Robyn Munro	Laura Watt		Dumfries, Scotland
Michèle Jäggi	Irene Schori	Stefanie Berset	Sarah Müller	Lara Stocker	Bern, Switzerland
Daniela Jentsch	Emira Abbes	Mia Höhne	Analena Jentsch		Füssen, Germany
Selina Witschonke (Fourth)	Elena Mathis	Raphaela Keiser (Skip)	Marina Lörtscher		St. Moritz, Switzerland
Eirin Mesloe	Torild Bjørnstad	Nora Østgård	Ingeborg Forbregd		Lillehammer, Norway
Rebecca Morrison	Gina Aitken	Sophie Sinclair	Sophie Jackson		Stirling, Scotland
Kristin Skaslien (Fourth)	Maia Ramsfjell (Note: Maia Ramsfjell spared for Marianne Rørvik.) (Skip)	Mille Haslev Nordbye	Martine Rønning		Oslo, Norway
Isabella Wranå	Almida de Val	Linda Stenlund	Maria Larsson	Jennie Wåhlin	Sundbyberg, Sweden

=== Round-robin standings ===
Final round-robin standings

Key
Teams to Playoffs

Pool A	W	DSW	DSL	L	PTS	PF	PA
(Norway) Team Rørvik	5	0	0	0	15	36	14
(Italy) Stefania Constantini	3	0	1	1	10	29	27
(Switzerland) Michèle Jäggi	2	1	0	2	8	31	29
(Sweden) Isabella Wranå	1	1	0	3	5	28	26
(Scotland) Lucy Blair	1	0	1	3	4	19	32
(Scotland) Fay Henderson	1	0	0	4	3	23	38

Pool B	W	DSW	DSL	L	PTS	PF	PA
(Germany) Daniela Jentsch	3	0	1	0	10	24	18
(Norway) Eirin Mesloe	1	2	0	1	7	25	24
(Switzerland) Raphaela Keiser	1	1	0	2	5	18	18
(Scotland) Beth Farmer	1	0	1	2	4	16	22
(Scotland) Rebecca Morrison	1	0	1	2	4	25	26

=== Round-robin results ===
All draw times are listed in British Summer Time (UTC+01:00).

==== Draw 1 ====
Thursday, 18 August, 8:30 am

Sheet B	1	2	3	4	5	6	7	8	9	Final
(Sweden) Isabella Wranå 🔨	0	1	0	2	1	0	0	0	1	5
(Scotland) Lucy Blair	0	0	1	0	0	1	1	1	0	4

Sheet C	1	2	3	4	5	6	7	8	Final
(Switzerland) Michèle Jäggi 🔨	3	0	0	4	2	0	X	X	9
(Scotland) Fay Henderson	0	0	2	0	0	2	X	X	4

Sheet D	1	2	3	4	5	6	7	8	Final
(Italy) Stefania Constantini 🔨	0	0	1	1	1	0	0	0	3
(Norway) Team Rørvik	0	2	0	0	0	2	0	1	5

==== Draw 2 ====
Thursday, 18 August, 12:30 pm

Sheet C	1	2	3	4	5	6	7	8	9	Final
(Switzerland) Raphaela Keiser 🔨	0	1	0	1	0	0	1	0	1	4
(Scotland) Beth Farmer	0	0	2	0	0	1	0	0	0	3

Sheet D	1	2	3	4	5	6	7	8	9	Final
(Scotland) Rebecca Morrison	0	1	0	2	0	1	0	4	0	8
(Norway) Eirin Mesloe 🔨	2	0	1	0	1	0	4	0	1	9

==== Draw 3 ====
Thursday, 18 August, 4:30 pm

Sheet B	1	2	3	4	5	6	7	8	Final
(Scotland) Fay Henderson	0	0	3	1	0	2	0	X	6
(Italy) Stefania Constantini 🔨	0	0	0	0	4	0	5	X	9

Sheet C	1	2	3	4	5	6	7	8	Final
(Norway) Team Rørvik	0	1	3	1	0	1	0	1	7
(Sweden) Isabella Wranå 🔨	1	0	0	0	2	0	2	0	5

Sheet D	1	2	3	4	5	6	7	8	Final
(Scotland) Lucy Blair 🔨	2	1	0	0	0	1	0	X	4
(Switzerland) Michèle Jäggi	0	0	2	2	2	0	1	X	7

==== Draw 4 ====
Thursday, 18 August, 8:30 pm

Sheet B	1	2	3	4	5	6	7	8	Final
(Scotland) Beth Farmer	0	3	1	0	1	0	2	1	8
(Scotland) Rebecca Morrison 🔨	1	0	0	4	0	2	0	0	7

Sheet C	1	2	3	4	5	6	7	8	9	Final
(Norway) Eirin Mesloe 🔨	1	1	0	0	0	3	0	1	1	7
(Germany) Daniela Jentsch	0	0	2	2	1	0	1	0	0	6

==== Draw 5 ====
Friday, 19 August, 8:30 am

Sheet B	1	2	3	4	5	6	7	8	Final
(Norway) Team Rørvik 🔨	3	1	1	3	1	X	X	X	9
(Scotland) Lucy Blair	0	0	0	0	0	X	X	X	0

Sheet C	1	2	3	4	5	6	7	8	9	Final
(Italy) Stefania Constantini 🔨	1	0	2	0	1	0	2	0	0	6
(Switzerland) Michèle Jäggi	0	2	0	0	0	1	0	3	1	7

Sheet D	1	2	3	4	5	6	7	8	Final
(Sweden) Isabella Wranå 🔨	2	0	1	0	0	1	1	0	5
(Scotland) Fay Henderson	0	1	0	1	2	0	0	2	6

==== Draw 6 ====
Friday, 19 August, 12:30 pm

Sheet C	1	2	3	4	5	6	7	8	Final
(Scotland) Rebecca Morrison	1	2	0	1	0	2	0	X	6
(Switzerland) Raphaela Keiser 🔨	0	0	1	0	1	0	0	X	2

Sheet D	1	2	3	4	5	6	7	8	Final
(Germany) Daniela Jentsch 🔨	0	1	0	3	1	0	0	X	5
(Scotland) Beth Farmer	0	0	1	0	0	1	0	X	2

==== Draw 7 ====
Friday, 19 August, 4:30 pm

Sheet B	1	2	3	4	5	6	7	8	Final
(Switzerland) Michèle Jäggi	0	1	0	2	0	0	0	X	3
(Sweden) Isabella Wranå 🔨	2	0	2	0	1	1	2	X	8

Sheet C	1	2	3	4	5	6	7	8	Final
(Scotland) Fay Henderson	0	1	0	0	0	X	X	X	1
(Norway) Team Rørvik 🔨	2	0	2	2	2	X	X	X	8

Sheet D	1	2	3	4	5	6	7	8	Final
(Italy) Stefania Constantini 🔨	0	1	2	0	1	0	1	0	5
(Scotland) Lucy Blair	1	0	0	1	0	1	0	1	4

==== Draw 8 ====
Friday, 19 August, 8:30 pm

Sheet B	1	2	3	4	5	6	7	8	Final
(Switzerland) Raphaela Keiser 🔨	1	0	0	0	0	2	0	2	5
(Germany) Daniela Jentsch	0	1	0	0	2	0	3	0	6

Sheet C	1	2	3	4	5	6	7	8	Final
(Scotland) Beth Farmer	0	0	0	1	1	1	0	X	3
(Norway) Eirin Mesloe 🔨	0	0	2	0	0	0	4	X	6

==== Draw 9 ====
Saturday, 20 August, 9:00 am

Sheet B	1	2	3	4	5	6	7	8	Final
(Scotland) Lucy Blair	0	0	2	2	2	1	0	0	7
(Scotland) Fay Henderson 🔨	1	1	0	0	0	0	3	1	6

Sheet C	1	2	3	4	5	6	7	8	Final
(Sweden) Isabella Wranå	0	2	0	2	0	1	0	0	5
(Italy) Stefania Constantini 🔨	1	0	2	0	0	0	2	1	6

Sheet D	1	2	3	4	5	6	7	8	Final
(Switzerland) Michèle Jäggi 🔨	1	0	1	1	0	2	0	0	5
(Norway) Team Rørvik	0	2	0	0	1	0	2	2	7

==== Draw 10 ====
Saturday, 20 August, 1:00 pm

Sheet C	1	2	3	4	5	6	7	8	Final
(Germany) Daniela Jentsch 🔨	0	2	1	0	2	0	1	1	7
(Scotland) Rebecca Morrison	1	0	0	1	0	2	0	0	4

Sheet D	1	2	3	4	5	6	7	8	Final
(Switzerland) Raphaela Keiser 🔨	0	3	0	2	0	1	0	1	7
(Norway) Eirin Mesloe	0	0	1	0	1	0	1	0	3

=== Playoffs ===
Quarterfinals
B2	(Norway) Eirin Mesloe	4
A3	(Switzerland) Michèle Jäggi	5
A2	(Italy) Stefania Constantini	3
B3	(Switzerland) Raphaela Keiser	6

Semifinals
A1	(Norway) Team Rørvik	7
A3	(Switzerland) Michèle Jäggi	5
B1	(Germany) Daniela Jentsch	7
B3	(Switzerland) Raphaela Keiser	3

Final
A1	(Norway) Team Rørvik	3
B1	(Germany) Daniela Jentsch	5

==== Quarterfinals ====
Saturday, 20 August, 6:00 pm

Sheet B	1	2	3	4	5	6	7	8	Final
(Norway) Eirin Mesloe 🔨	0	0	0	0	2	2	0	0	4
(Switzerland) Michèle Jäggi	0	0	1	2	0	0	1	1	5

Sheet D	1	2	3	4	5	6	7	8	Final
(Italy) Stefania Constantini 🔨	0	0	1	1	1	0	0	X	3
(Switzerland) Raphaela Keiser	0	1	0	0	0	3	2	X	6

==== Semifinals ====
Sunday, 21 August, 8:30 am

Sheet B	1	2	3	4	5	6	7	8	Final
(Germany) Daniela Jentsch 🔨	0	0	0	3	0	4	0	X	7
(Switzerland) Raphaela Keiser	0	0	1	0	1	0	1	X	3

Sheet D	1	2	3	4	5	6	7	8	9	Final
(Norway) Team Rørvik 🔨	0	0	1	0	2	2	0	0	2	7
(Switzerland) Michèle Jäggi	0	0	0	1	0	0	3	1	0	5

==== Final ====
Sunday, 21 August, 12:30 pm

Sheet C	1	2	3	4	5	6	7	8	Final
(Norway) Team Rørvik 🔨	0	2	1	0	0	0	0	0	3
(Germany) Daniela Jentsch	0	0	0	1	1	1	1	1	5
