= Norwegian Mixed Curling Championship =

The Norwegian Mixed Curling Championship (Norwegian: Norgesmesterskap (NM) i mixed curling) is the national championship of mixed curling (two men and two women) in Norway. It has been held annually since 1995 and organized by the Norwegian Curling Association (Norwegian: Norges Curlingforbund).

In mixed curling, the positions on a team must alternate between men and women. If a man throws last rocks, which is usually the case, the women must throw lead rocks and third rocks, while the other male member of the team throws second rocks.

== List of champions and medallists ==
The past champions and medalists of the event are listed as follows (in order - fourth/skip, third, second, lead, alternate; skips marked bold):

Year	Champion (team, curling club, line-up)	Runner-up	Bronze
1995	Halden Curling Club; Jan Øivind Hewitt, Anne Grethe Bremnes, Jan Marcus Lilledal, Anne Grethe Hewitt		
2000	Oppdal Curling Club; Stig Høiberg, Grethe Wolan, Christian Jørgensen, Else Skogan		
2004	Oppdal Curling Club; Øivind Andre Grøseth, Solveig Enoksen, Kristin Skaslien, Hans Roger Tømmervold		
2005	Lillehammer Curling Club; Thomas Løvold, Linn Githmark, Thomas Due, Camilla Grøseth		
2006	Snarøen Curling Club; Håvard Vad Petersson, Henriette Wang, Christoffer Svae, Åsa Celius		
2007	Halden Curling Club; Jan Marcus Lilledal, Anne Grethe Hewitt, Jan Øivind Hewitt, Anne Christine Berg		
2008	Snarøya Curling Club; Thomas Løvold, ?, Christoffer Svae, ?		
2009	Oppdal Curling Club; Eli Skaslien, Steffen Walstad, Kjersti Husby, Steffen Mellemseter		
2010	Mixed Curling Club; Sander Rølvåg, Kristine Davanger, Frode W, Malin Frondell Løchen		
2011	Halden Curling Club; Ole Hauge, Hilde Stenseth, Tomas Moe, Anne Grethe Bremnes		
2012	Mixed Curling Club; Steffen Walstad, Pia Trulsen, Magnus Nedregotten, Ingvild Skaga		
2013	Oppdal Curling Club; Hans Roger Tømmervold, Marte Bakk, Hans Olav Storlien, Solveig Enoksen		
2014	Snarøen Curling Club; Steffen Walstad, Kristin Skaslien, Magnus Nedregotten, Julie Kjær Molnar		
2015	?		
2016	Lag Ramsfjell, Jar CK (Jar); Magnus Ramsfjell, Maia Ramsfjell, Eigil Ramsfjell, Mathilde Hoem	Lag Wibe, Halden CC (Halden); Christer Wibe, Elin Ingvaldsen, Victor Bergerskogen, Jeanette Husnes-Moe	Lag Ugland, Christiansand CK (Christiansand); Even Ugland, Natalia Kylypenko, Tom Høiland, Kristin Jordal
2017	Lag Skaga, Oppdal CK (Oppdal); Martin Sesaker, Erin Mesloe, Willhelm Næss, Ingvild Skaga	Lag Mjøen, Oppdal CK (Oppdal); Harald Skarsheim Rian, Eline Mjøen, Jakob Haugland, Hannah Skarsheim Rian	Lag Rønning, Lillehammer CK (Lillehammer); Ingebrigt Bjørnstad, Martine Rønning, Martin Dønheim, Mille Haslev Nordbye
2018	Lag Næss, Oppdal CK/Stabekk CK (Oppdal/Stabekk); Willhelm Næss, Ingvild Skaga, Martin Sesaker, Erin Mesloe	Lag Nepstad, Lillehammer CK/Stabekk CK/Trondheim CK/Oppdal CK; Gaute Nepstad, Stine Haalien, Alf Kristian Fahle, Astri Forbregd	Lag Høstmælingen, Lillehammer CK (Lillehammer); Elias Høstmælingen, Martine Rønning, Eskil Vintervold, Mille Haslev Nordbye
2019	Lag Skaga, Oppdal CK/Stabekk CK (Oppdal/Stabekk); Willhelm Næss, Ingvild Skaga, Harald Skarsheim Rian, Erin Mesloe	Lag Borgersen, Jevnaker CK (Jevnaker); Tom Borgersen, Anniken Pettersen, Lars A. Bjørklund, Beate Ruden	Lag Brænden, Lillehammer CK/Oppdal CK (Lillehammer/Oppdal); Mathias Brænden, Martine Vollan Rønning, Ådne Birketveit, Anne Foss
...
2024	LCK Buraas, Lillehammer CK (Lillehammer); Grunde Buraas, Martine Rønning, Harald Dæhlin, Andrine Rønning	OCK Hårstad, Oppdal CK (Oppdal); Andreas Hårstad, Torild Bjørnstad, Michael Mellemseter, Ingeborg Forbregd	OCK/LCK Brænden, Oppdal CK/Lillehammer CK (Oppdal/Lillehammer); Mathias Brænden, Nora Østgård, Eskil Eriksen, Eilin Kjærland

== See also ==
- Norwegian Men's Curling Championship
- Norwegian Women's Curling Championship
- Norwegian Mixed Doubles Curling Championship
- Norwegian Junior Mixed Doubles Curling Championship
