= Norwegian Mixed Doubles Curling Championship =

National curling championship

The Norwegian Mixed Doubles Curling Championship (Norwegian: Norgesmesterskap i curling for Mixed Double; NM i curling Mixed Double) is the national championship of mixed doubles curling (one man and one woman) in Norway. It has been held annually since the 2016–17 season. The championships are organized by the Norwegian Curling Association (Norwegian: Norges Curlingforbund).

== List of champions and medallists ==
Year	Host city	Champion		Runner-up		Bronze		Placement at Worlds
Year	Host city	Woman	Man	Woman	Man	Woman	Man	Placement at Worlds
2017	Oslo	Kristin Skaslien	Magnus Nedregotten	Marianne Rørvik	Torger Nergård	Julie Kjær Molnar	Steffen Walstad	5
2018	Oppdal	Maia Ramsfjell	Magnus Ramsfjell	Pia Trulsen	Steffen Walstad	Eirin Mesloe	Ingebrigt Bjørnstad	11
2019	Jar	Kristin Skaslien	Magnus Nedregotten	Marianne Rørvik	Torger Nergård	Maia Ramsfjell	Magnus Ramsfjell	9
2020	Lillehammer	Maia Ramsfjell	Magnus Ramsfjell	Marianne Rørvik	Torger Nergård	Martine Rønning	Mathias Brænden	not held
2021, 2022	not held							
2023	Lillehammer	Martine Rønning	Mathias Brænden	Maia Ramsfjell	Magnus Ramsfjell	Ingvild Skaga	Nicolai Sommervold	(bronze) (2023)
2024	Lillehammer	Kristin Skaslien	Magnus Nedregotten	Martine Rønning	Mathias Brænden	Maia Ramsfjell	Magnus Ramsfjell	(bronze) (2024)
2025	Trondheim	Kristin Skaslien	Magnus Nedregotten	Nora Østgård	Eskil Eriksen	Martine Rønning	Mathias Brænden	8
2026	Oslo	Maia Ramsfjell	Bendik Ramsfjell	Martine Rønning	Grunde Buraas	Eilin Kjærland	Mathias Brænden	

== Medal record for curlers ==
Curler	Gold	Silver	Bronze
Magnus Nedregotten	4		
Kristin Skaslien	4		
Maia Ramsfjell	3	1	2
Magnus Ramsfjell	2	1	2
Mathias Brænden	1	1	3
Martine Rønning	1	2	2
Bendik Ramsfjell	1		
Torger Nergård		3	
Marianne Rørvik		3	
Steffen Walstad		1	1
Grunde Buraas		1	
Pia Trulsen		1	
Nora Østgård		1	
Eskil Eriksen		1	
Julie Kjær Molnar			1
Ingebrigt Bjørnstad			1
Eilin Kjærland			1
Eirin Mesloe			1
Ingvild Skaga			1
Nicolai Sommervold			1

== See also ==
- Norwegian Men's Curling Championship
- Norwegian Women's Curling Championship
- Norwegian Mixed Curling Championship
- Norwegian Junior Mixed Doubles Curling Championship
