= Norwegian Junior Mixed Doubles Curling Championship =

The Norwegian Junior Mixed Doubles Curling Championship (Norwegian: Norgesmesterskap for Mixed Double Junior; NM Mixed Double Junior, NM Junior Mixed Double, NM junior mixed doubles) is the national championship of mixed doubles curling (one man and one woman) in Norway. Junior level curlers must be under the age of 21. It has been held annually since the 2019–2020 season. The championships are organized by the Norwegian Curling Association (Norwegian: Norges Curlingforbund).

== List of champions and medallists ==
Team line-ups shows in order: woman, man, coach (if exists).

Year	Host city, dates	Champion	Runner-up	Bronze	Placement at Worlds
2020	Stange, Feb. 29 – Mar. 1	Martine Rønning / Mathias Brænden	Henriette Helgevold / Nicolai Sommervold	Astri Forbregd / Andreas Hårstad	—
2021	not held due to the COVID-19 pandemic.				—
2022	Stange, Feb. 19-20	Nora Østgård / Eskil Eriksen	Mille Haslev Nordbye / Grunde Buraas	Ingeborg Forbregd / Lukas Høstmælingen	—
2023	Trondheim, Nov. 18-20, 2022	Nora Østgård / Eskil Eriksen	Ingeborg Forbregd / Lukas Høstmælingen	Sylvi Hausstätter / Harald Dæhlin	—
2024	not held				—
2025	Lillehammer, Nov. 16-17, 2024	Nora Østgård / Eskil Eriksen	Sylvi Hausstâtter / Sigurd L. Svorkmo	Andrine V Rønning / Harald Dæhlin	10

== Medal record for curlers ==
Curler	Gold	Silver	Bronze
Eskil Eriksen	3		
Nora Østgård	3		
Mathias Brænden	1		
Martine Rønning	1		
Ingeborg Forbregd		1	1
Sylvi Hausstätter		1	1
Lukas Høstmælingen		1	1
Grunde Buraas		1	
Henriette Helgevold		1	
Mille Haslev Nordbye		1	
Nicolai Sommervold		1	
Sigurd L. Svorkmo		1	
Harald Dæhlin			2
Astri Forbregd			1
Andreas Hårstad			1
Andrine V Rønning			1

== See also ==
- Norwegian Men's Curling Championship
- Norwegian Women's Curling Championship
- Norwegian Mixed Curling Championship
- Norwegian Mixed Doubles Curling Championship
