= Ingeborg Forbregd =

Norwegian curler

- Curler ♀
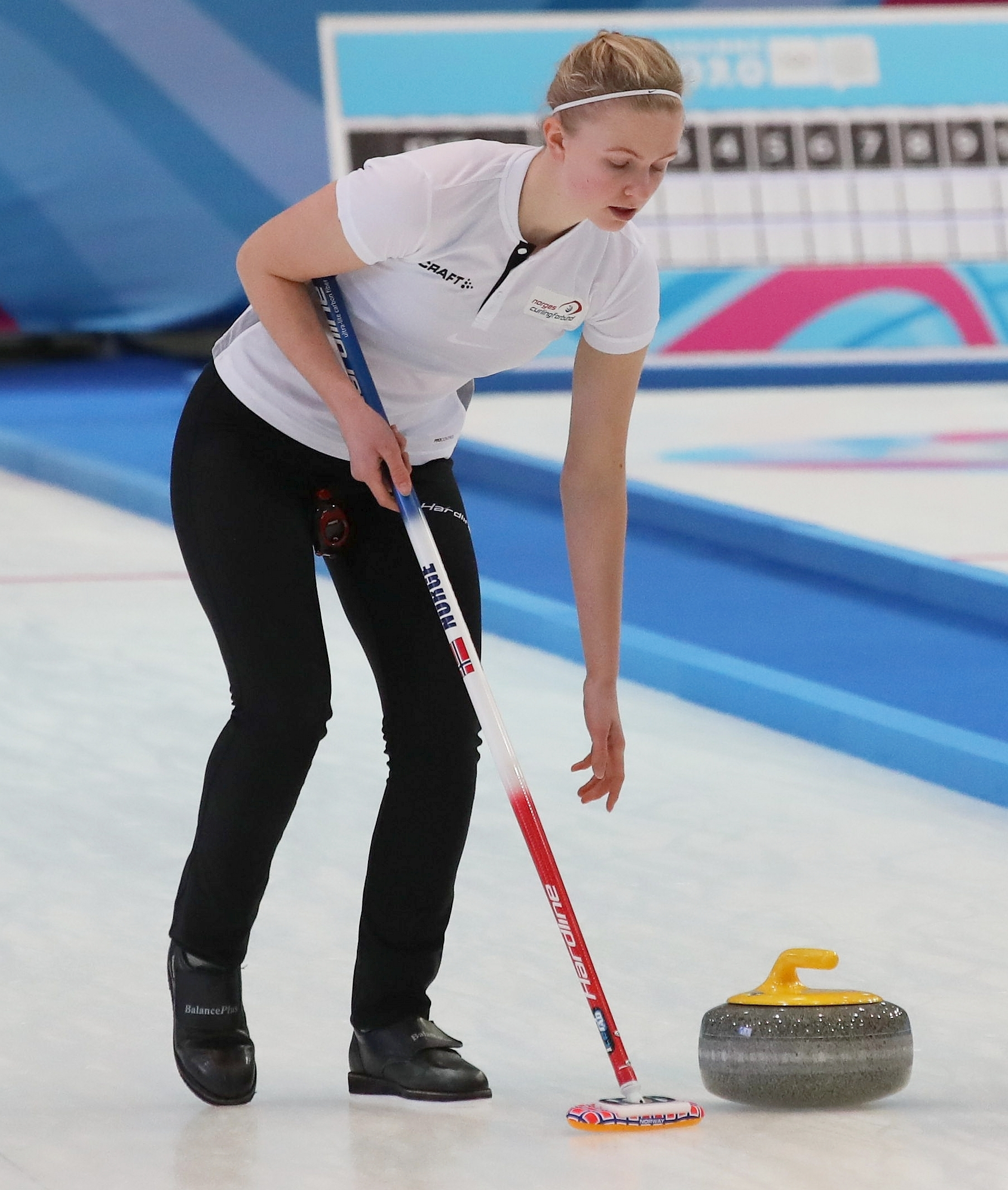
- Born: 5 February 2003 (age 23); Oppdal, Norway

Team
- Curling club: Oppdal CK, Oppdal
- Skip: Torild Bjørnstad
- Third: Nora Østgård
- Second: Ingeborg Forbregd
- Lead: Eirin Mesloe

Curling career
- Member Association: Norway
- World Championship: 3 (2024, 2025, 2026)
- European Championship: 4 (2023, 2024, 2025, 2026)
- World Junior Curling Championship: 3 (2022, 2023, 2024)
- Other appearances: Winter Youth Olympics: 1 (2020), Winter World University Games: 1 (2025)
Medal record
Curling
European Championships
Bronze medal – third place	2023 Aberdeen
World Junior Championships
Bronze medal – third place	2023 Füssen
Bronze medal – third place	2024 Lohja
Winter Youth Olympics
Gold medal – first place	2020 Lausanne	Mixed team
Norwegian Women's Curling Championship
Gold medal – first place	2022 Haugesund
Gold medal – first place	2024 Oslo
Gold medal – first place	2025 Halden
Silver medal – second place	2026 Lillehammer
Bronze medal – third place	2019 Lillehammer
Bronze medal – third place	2023 Lillehammer

Ingeborg Forbregd (born 5 March 2003 in Oppdal) is a Norwegian female curler from Trondheim.

At the international level, she is a 2020 Winter Youth Olympics champion curler (mixed team event), 2023 European championships and two-time World junior championships bronze medalist.

At the national level, she is a three-time Norwegian women's champion curler.

== Personal life ==
As of 2026, she was a student.

== Teams and events ==
=== Women's ===
Season	Skip	Third	Second	Lead	Alternate	Coach	Events
2017–18	Eirin Mesloe	Nina Aune	Sara Holmen	Ingeborg Forbregd	Torild Bjørnstad		NWCC 2018 (4th)
2018–19	Eirin Mesloe	Nina Aune	Ingeborg Forbregd	Torild Bjørnstad			NWCC 2019 (bronze)
2019–20	Eirin Mesloe	Nina Aune	Ingeborg Forbregd	Torild Bjørnstad			NWCC 2020 (6th)
2020–21	Eirin Mesloe	Nora Østgård	Torild Bjørnstad	Ingeborg Forbregd			
2021–22	Eirin Mesloe	Torild Bjørnstad	Nora Østgård	Ingeborg Forbregd	Nina Aune (WJCC)	Vegard Mesloe (WJCC)	WJCC 2022 (4th); NWCC 2022 (gold)
2022–23	Torild Bjørnstad	Nora Østgård	Ingeborg Forbregd	Eilin Kjærland	Siri Østågard (WJCC)	Ingebrigt Bjørnstad (WJCC)	WJCC 2023 (bronze)
2022–23	Eirin Mesloe	Torild Bjørnstad	Nora Østgård	Ingeborg Forbregd			NWCC 2023 (bronze)
2023–24	Torild Bjørnstad	Nora Østgård	Ingeborg Forbregd	Eilin Kjærland		Ingebrigt Bjørnstad (WJCC)	WJCC 2024 (bronze); NWCC 2024 (gold)
2023–24	Kristin Skaslien (Fourth)	Marianne Rørvik (Skip)	Mille Haslev Nordbye	Martine Rønning	Ingeborg Forbregd	Rune Steen Hansen (ECC, WCC), Tinius Haslev Nordbye (ECC)	ECC 2023 (bronze); WCC 2024 (9th)
2024–25	Kristin Skaslien (Fourth)	Marianne Rørvik (Skip)	Mille Haslev Nordbye	Eilin Kjærland	Ingeborg Forbregd	Rune Steen Hansen (ECC, WCC)	ECC 2024 (7th); WCC 2025 (8th)
2024–25	Torild Bjørnstad	Nora Østgård	Ingeborg Forbregd	Eirin Mesloe		Ingebrigt Bjørnstad (WUG)	WUG 2025 (4th); NWCC 2025 (gold)
2025–26	Kristin Skaslien (Fourth)	Marianne Rørvik (Skip)	Mille Haslev Nordbye	Eilin Kjærland	Ingeborg Forbregd	Rune Steen Hansen	ECC 2025 (4th)
2025–26	Torild Bjørnstad	Nora Østgård	Ingeborg Forbregd	Eirin Mesloe	Mille Haslev Nordbye (WCC)	Ingebrigt Bjørnstad	NWCC 2026 (silver); WCC 2026 (9th)
2026–27	Torild Bjørnstad	Nora Østgård	Ingeborg Forbregd	Eirin Mesloe		Ingebrigt Bjørnstad	

=== Mixed ===
Season	Skip	Third	Second	Lead	Coach	Events
2019–20	Grunde Buraas (fourth)	Nora Østgård	Lukas Høstmælingen (skip)	Ingeborg Forbregd	Gaute Nepstad	WYOG 2020 (gold)
2022–23	Lukas Høstmælingen	Torild Bjørnstad	Martin Sesaker	Ingeborg Forbregd		NMxCC 2023 (4th)
2023–24	Andreas Hårstad	Torild Bjørnstad	Michael Mellemseter	Ingeborg Forbregd		NMxCC 2024 (silver)

=== Mixed doubles ===
Season	Female	Male	Coach	Events
2018–19	Ingeborg Forbregd	Lucas Høstmælingen		NMDCC 2019 (14th)
2019–20	(Norway) Ingeborg Forbregd	(Latvia) Ričards Vonda	Gaute Nepstad	WYOG 2020 (25th)
2019–20	Ingeborg Forbregd	Lucas Høstmælingen		NMDCC 2020 (4th)
2021–22	Ingeborg Forbregd	Lucas Høstmælingen		NJMDCC 2022 (bronze)
2022–23	Ingeborg Forbregd	Lucas Høstmælingen		NJMDCC 2023 (silver)
2023–24	Ingeborg Forbregd	Grunde Buraas		NMDCC 2024 (8th)
2024–25	Ingeborg Forbregd	Andreas Hårstad		NMDCC 2025 (8th)
