= Norwegian Championship =

A Norwegian Championship (Norwegian: Norgesmesterskap, NM; definite form: Norgesmesterskapet) is a nationwide competition in Norway in some category. The winner is given the title of norgesmester (Norwegian Champion) or norsk mester (Norwegian Master).

== Notable Championships ==
- Norwegian Allround Championships
- Norwegian Athletics Championships
- Norwegian Indoor Athletics Championships
- Norwegian Biathlon Championships
- Norwegian Chess Championship
- Norwegian Men's Curling Championship
- Norwegian Mixed Curling Championship
- Norwegian Mixed Doubles Curling Championship
- Norwegian Women's Curling Championship
- Norwegian Figure Skating Championships
- Norwegian Football Cup
- IPSC Norwegian Handgun Championship
- IPSC Norwegian Rifle Championship
- Norwegian National Road Race Championships
- Norwegian Individual Speedway Championship
- Norwegian National Time Trial Championships
- Norwegian Touring Car Championship
- Norwegian Under-16 Football Championship

== See also ==
- Norwegian Olympic and Paralympic Committee and Confederation of Sports
