= WCT Latvian International Challenger =

World Curling Tour event

- Established: 2017
- Host city: Tukums, Latvia
- Arena: Tukuma Ledus Halle
- Men's purse: € 3,000
- Women's purse: € 3,000

Current champions (2022)
- Men: (Latvia) Mārtiņš Trukšāns
- Women: (Switzerland) Corrie Hürlimann

The WCT Latvian International Challenger is an annual tournament on the men's and women's World Curling Tour. It is held annually in October at the Tukuma Ledus Halle in Tukums, Latvia.

The purse for the event is € 3,000, with the winning team receiving €1,000.

The event has been held since 2017.

== Men's champions ==
Year	Winning team	Runner up team	Purse (€)	Winner's share (€)
2017	(Denmark) Rasmus Stjerne, Johnny Frederiksen, Mikkel Poulsen, Oliver Dupont	(Switzerland) Yves Hess, Rainer Kobler, Michael Müller, Fabian Schmid	€ 3,000	€ 1,400
2018	(Finland) Wille Mäkelä, Kalle Kiiskinen, Teemu Salo, Paavo Kuosmanen	(Estonia) Harri Lill, Karl Kukner, Ingar Mäesalu, Tanel Toomväli	€ 3,000	€ 1,400
2019	(Sweden) Daniel Magnusson, Robin Ahlberg, Anton Regosa, Sebastian Jones	(Switzerland) Lucien Lottenbach, Rainer Kobler, Patrick Abächerli, Tom Winkelhausen	€ 3,000	€ 1,400
2020	Cancelled			
2021	(Scotland) Cameron Bryce, Callum Kinnear, Mark Taylor, Robin McCall	(Poland) Konrad Stych, Krzyszstof Domin, Marcin Cieminski, Bartosz Lobaza	€ 3,000	€ 1,400
2021	(Scotland) Cameron Bryce, Callum Kinnear, Mark Taylor, Robin McCall	(Poland) Konrad Stych, Krzyszstof Domin, Marcin Cieminski, Bartosz Lobaza	€ 3,000	€ 1,400
2022	(Latvia) Mārtiņš Trukšāns, Jānis Klīve, Arnis Veidemanis, Sandris Buholcs	(Estonia) Eduard Veltsman, Mihhail Vlassov, Janis Kiziridi, Igor Dzenzeljuk	€ 3,000	€ 1,000

== Women's champions ==
Year	Winning team	Runner up team	Purse (€)	Winner's share (€)
2017	(Germany) Daniela Jentsch, Josephine Obermann, Analena Jentsch, Pia-Lisa Schöll	(Switzerland) Briar Hürlimann, Elena Stern (skip), Lisa Gisler, Céline Koller	€ 3,000	€ 1,400
2018	(Scotland) Maggie Wilson, Jennifer Marshall, Amy MacDonald, Eilidh Yeats	(Finland) Oona Kauste, Eszter Juhász, Maija Salmiovirta, Lotta Immonen	€ 3,000	€ 1,400
2019	(Norway) Maia Ramsfjell, Martine Rønning, Mille Haslev Nordbye, Astri Forbregd	(Latvia) Iveta Staša-Šaršūne, Santa Blumberga, Ieva Krusta, Evelīna Barone	€ 3,000	€ 1,400
2020	Cancelled			
2021	(Russia) Vlada Rumiantseva, Aleksandra Mozzherina, Aleksandra Stoyarosova, Ekaterina Kungurova	(Scotland) Amy MacDonald, Susie Smith, Eilidh Yeats, Nicola Joiner	€ 3,000	€ 1,400
2022	(Switzerland) Corrie Hürlimann, Melina Bezzola, Jessica Jäggi, Anna Gut	(Scotland) Lucy Blair, Alexandra MacKintosh, Holly Hamilton, Susie Smith	€ 3,000	€ 1,000
