= Mathias Brænden =

Norwegian curler (born 1999)

- Curler ♂
- Born: 1999; Moelv, Norway

Team
- Curling club: Lillehammer CK, Lillehammer
- Skip: Magnus Ramsfjell
- Third: Steffen Walstad
- Second: Bendik Ramsfjell
- Lead: Mathias Brænden
- Mixed doubles partner: Eilin Kjærland

Curling career
- Member Association: Norway
- World Championship: 2 (2022, 2026)
- World Mixed Doubles Championship: 2 (2023, 2026)
- European Championship: 2 (2022, 2026)
- Other appearances: Winter World University Games: 1 (2023), 2017 European Youth Olympic Winter Festival
Medal record
Representing Norway
Curling
World Mixed Doubles Championship
Bronze medal – third place	2023 Gangneung
Norwegian Men's Curling Championship
Silver medal – second place	2024 Oslo
Silver medal – second place	2026 Lillehammer
Bronze medal – third place	2019 Haugesund
Bronze medal – third place	2023 Oppdal
Norwegian Mixed Doubles Championship
Gold medal – first place	2023 Haugesund
Silver medal – second place	2024 Lillehammer
Bronze medal – third place	2020 Lillehammer
Bronze medal – third place	2025 Lillehammer
Bronze medal – third place	2026 Oslo

Mathias Brænden (born 1999 in Moelv) is a Norwegian curler. He currently plays lead on Team Magnus Ramsfjell.

At the international level, he is a World mixed doubles bronze medalist (2023).

At the national level, he is a Norwegian mixed doubles champion curler (2023).

== Teams and events ==
=== Men's ===
Season	Skip	Third	Second	Lead	Alternate	Coach	Events
2015–16	Mathias Brænden	Jens Grassbakken	Ådne Birketveit	Niclas Engevold Nordhagen	Erik Brænden		NMCC 2016 (14th)
2016–17	Mathias Brænden	Jens Grasbakken-Lokken	Adne Birketveit	Niclas Nordhagen		Stein Erik Johansen	EYOF 2017 (5th)
2016–17	Mathias Brænden	Ådne Birketveit	Jens Grassbakken Løkken	Niclas Engevold Nordhagen			NMCC 2017 (10th)
2017–18	Mathias Brænden	Ådne Birketveit	Jens Grassbakken Løkken	Niclas Engevold Nordhagen			
2018–19	Mathias Brænden	Niclas Nordhagen	Ådne Birketveit	Elias Høstmælinen			NMCC 2019 (bronze)
2019–20	Mathias Brænden	Olav Kringlebotn	Ådne Birketveit	Niclas Nordhagen	Stein Erik Johansen		NMCC 2020 (7th)
2020–21	Mathias Brænden	Eirik Oey	Johan Herfjord	Martin Bruseth			
2021–22	Magnus Nedregotten	Alexander Lindström	Mathias Brænden	Nicolai Sommervold			NMCC 2022 (8th)
2021–22	Magnus Ramsfjell	Martin Sesaker	Bendik Ramsfjell	Gaute Nepstad	Mathias Brænden	Pål Trulsen	WCC 2022 (10th)
2022–23	Steffen Walstad	Magnus Nedregotten	Mathias Brænden	Magnus Vågberg	Andreas Hårstad	Thomas Løvold	ECC 2022 (5th)
2022–23	Mathias Brænden	Andreas Hårstad	Nicolai Sommervold	Eirik Oey		Sander Rølvåg	WUG 2023 (7th)
2022–23	Steffen Walstad	Torger Nergård	Mathias Brænden	Magnus Vågberg	Anders Bjørgum		NMCC 2023 (bronze)
2023–24	Andreas Hårstad	Mathias Brænden	Michael Mellemseter	Wilhelm Næss	Emil Kvål		NMCC 2024 (silver)
2024–25	Andreas Hårstad	Wilhelm Næss	Michael Mellemseter	Mathias Brænden			NMCC 2025 (4th)
2025–26	Andreas Hårstad	Wilhelm Næss	Michael Mellemseter	Mathias Brænden			NMCC 2026 (silver); WCC 2026 (13th)
2026–27	Magnus Ramsfjell	Steffen Walstad	Bendik Ramsfjell	Mathias Brænden			

=== Mixed ===
Season	Skip	Third	Second	Lead	Events
2017–18	Mathias Brænden	Sara Holmen	Ådne Birketveit	Anne Foss	NMxCC 2018 (5th)
2018–19	Mathias Brænden	Martine Vollan Rønning	Ådne Birketveit	Anne Foss	NMxCC 2019 (bronze)
2023–24	Mathias Brænden	Nora Østgård	Eskil Eriksen	Eilin Kjærland	NMxCC 2024 (bronze)

=== Mixed doubles ===
Season	Female	Male	Coach	Events
2017–18	Mille Haslev Nordbye	Mathias Brænden		NMDCC 2018 (4th)
2018–19	Martine Rønning	Mathias Brænden		NMDCC 2019 (4th)
2019–20	Martine Rønning	Mathias Brænden		NJMDCC 2020 (gold); NMDCC 2020 (bronze)
2022–23	Martine Rønning	Mathias Brænden	Thomas Løvold (WMDCC)	NMDCC 2023 (gold); WMDCC 2023 (bronze)
2023–24	Martine Rønning	Mathias Brænden		NMDCC 2024 (silver)
2024–25	Martine Rønning	Mathias Brænden		NMDCC 2025 (bronze)
2025–26	Eilin Kjærland	Mathias Brænden		NMDCC 2026 (bronze); WMDCC 2026 (9th)
