= Curling at the 2017 European Youth Olympic Winter Festival =

European Youth Olympic Festival

- Host city: Erzurum, Turkey
- Arena: Milli Piyango Curling Arena
- Dates: February 13 - February 17
- Men's winner: Russia
- Skip: German Doronin
- Third: Georgii Epremian
- Second: Sergei Maksimov
- Lead: Dmitry Sirotkin
- Alternate: Kirill Postnov
- Finalist: Netherlands (Wouter Gosgens)
- Women's winner: Russia
- Skip: Irina Nizovtseva
- Third: Nadezhda Beliakova
- Second: Arina Piantina
- Lead: Anastasiia Mishchenko
- Alternate: Mariia Ermeichuk
- Finalist: Turkey (Mihriban Polat)

Curling at the 2017 European Youth Olympic Winter Festival was held from February to February 7 at the Milli Piyango Curling Arena in Erzurum, Turkey.

== Medal summary ==
=== Medal table ===
Rank	Nation	Gold	Silver	Bronze	Total
1	Russia (RUS)	2	0	0	2
2	Netherlands (NED)	0	1	0	1
2	Turkey (TUR)	0	1	0	1
4	Poland (POL)	0	0	1	1
4	Slovenia (SLO)	0	0	1	1
Totals (5 entries)		2	2	2	6

=== Medalists ===
Event	Gold	Silver	Bronze
Boys	Russia; German Doronin; Georgii Epremian; Sergei Maksimov; Dmitry Sirotkin; Kirill Postnov	Netherlands; Wouter Gosgens; Jop Kuijpers; Bart Klomp; Olaf Bolkenbaas	Slovenia; Stefan Sever; Aljaz Stopar; Noel Gregori; Luka Prezelj; Simon Langus
Girls	Russia; Irina Nizovtseva; Nadezhda Beliakova; Arina Piantina; Anastasiia Mishchenko; Mariia Ermeichuk	Turkey; Mihriban Polat; Berivan Polat; Kader Macit; Zeynep Oztemir; Hilal Nevruz	Poland; Daria Chmarra; Karolina Madnes; Katarzyna Orlinska; Marta Leszczynska; Ewa Nogly

== Boys ==
=== Teams ===
Netherlands	Norway	Russia	Slovenia	Turkey
Skip: Wouter Gosgens; Third: Jop Kuijpers; Second: Bart Klomp; Lead: Olaf Bolkenbaas; Coach: Shari Leibbrandt-Demmon	Skip: Mathias Braenden; Third: Jens Grasbakken-Lokken; Second: Adne Birketveit; Lead: Niclas Nordhagen; Coach: Stein Erik Johansen	Skip: German Doronin; Third: Georgii Epremian; Second: Sergei Maksimov; Lead: Dmitry Sirotkin; Alternate: Kirill Postnov; Coach: Olga Andrianova	Skip: Stefan Sever; Third: Aljaz Stopar; Second: Noel Gregori; Lead: Luka Prezelj; Alternate: Simon Langus; Coach: Gregor Verbinc	Skip: Oguzhan Karakurt; Third: Muhammet Haydar Demirel; Second: Ahmet Alperen Tunga; Lead: Ishak Ozsubasi; Alternate: Batuhan Bugra Kaygusuz; Coach: Ahmet Celik

(source:)

=== Round-robin standings ===
Official Round-robin standings

Key
Teams to Playoffs

Country	Skip	W	L
Slovenia	Stefan Sever	3	1
Russia	German Doronin	2	2
Turkey	Oguzhan Karakurt	2	2
Netherlands	Wouter Gosgens	2	2
Norway	Mathias Braenden	1	3

=== Round-robin results ===
All draw times are listed in (UTC+3).

==== Draw 1 ====
Monday, February 13, 19:00

Sheet A	1	2	3	4	5	6	7	8	Final
Russia	1	2	2	0	1	0	2	X	8
Turkey 🔨	0	0	0	2	0	1	0	X	3

Sheet D	1	2	3	4	5	6	7	8	Final
Slovenia 🔨	4	1	1	1	0	1	X	X	8
Norway	0	0	0	0	1	0	X	X	1

==== Draw 2 ====
Tuesday February 14, 13:00

Sheet A	1	2	3	4	5	6	7	8	Final
Russia 🔨	0	0	0	1	1	0	3	0	5
Netherlands	0	1	2	0	0	1	0	2	6

Sheet C	1	2	3	4	5	6	7	8	Final
Turkey 🔨	2	0	0	0	0	0	3	1	6
Norway	0	1	0	1	2	0	0	0	4

==== Draw 3 ====
Wednesday February 15, 9:00

Sheet C	1	2	3	4	5	6	7	8	Final
Slovenia	0	0	0	1	0	1	1	0	3
Russia 🔨	0	1	0	0	3	0	0	1	5

Sheet D	1	2	3	4	5	6	7	8	9	Final
Turkey	0	0	2	1	1	0	1	2	1	8
Netherlands 🔨	3	2	0	0	0	2	0	0	0	7

Wednesday February 15, 17:00

Sheet B	1	2	3	4	5	6	7	8	Final
Netherlands	0	0	1	0	0	2	0	X	3
Slovenia 🔨	1	1	0	1	0	0	3	X	6

Sheet E	1	2	3	4	5	6	7	8	Final
Norway 🔨	0	0	0	0	1	2	0	0	3
Russia	0	0	1	0	0	0	1	0	2

==== Draw 4 ====
Thursday February 16, 13:00

Sheet A	1	2	3	4	5	6	7	8	Final
Netherlands	0	3	2	0	2	0	0	0	7
Norway 🔨	1	0	0	3	0	0	1	1	6

Sheet E	1	2	3	4	5	6	7	8	Final
Turkey	0	0	0	0	1	0	1	X	2
Slovenia 🔨	0	1	1	0	0	2	0	X	4

=== Playoffs ===
Semifinals
1	Slovenia	2
4	Netherlands	4
2	Russia	3
3	Turkey	2

Gold Medal Game
4	Netherlands	3
2	Russia	5
Bronze Medal Game
1	Slovenia	6
3	Turkey	3

==== Semifinals ====
Friday, February 17, 9:00

Sheet D	1	2	3	4	5	6	7	8	Final
Netherlands	1	0	0	1	0	1	0	1	4
Slovenia 🔨	0	0	0	0	1	0	1	0	2

Sheet B	1	2	3	4	5	6	7	8	Final
Turkey	0	0	0	1	0	0	1	0	2
Russia 🔨	0	0	0	0	2	0	0	1	3

==== Bronze Medal Game ====
Friday, February 17, 14:30

Sheet A	1	2	3	4	5	6	7	8	Final
Turkey	0	0	0	1	0	2	0	X	3
Slovenia 🔨	2	0	3	0	1	0	0	X	6

==== Gold Medal Game ====
Friday, February 17, 14:30

Sheet C	1	2	3	4	5	6	7	8	Final
Russia 🔨	0	2	0	2	0	1	0	X	5
Netherlands	0	0	1	0	1	0	1	X	3

=== Final standings ===
Pos	Team	Skip	G	W	L
1st place, gold medalist(s)	Russia	German Doronin	6	4	2
2nd place, silver medalist(s)	Netherlands	Wouter Gosgens	6	3	3
3rd place, bronze medalist(s)	Slovenia	Stefan Sever	6	4	2
4	Turkey	Oguzhan Karakurt	6	2	4
5	Norway	Mathias Braenden	4	1	3

== Girls ==
=== Teams ===
Norway	Poland	Russia	Turkey	Turkey 2
Skip: Eline Mjoen; Third: Malin Foss; Second: Astri Forbregd; Lead: Hannah Skarsheim Rian; Coach: Stale Rian	Skip: Daria Chmarra; Third: Karolina Madnes; Second: Katarzyna Orlinska; Lead: Marta Leszczynska; Alternate: Ewa Nogly; Coach: Agnieszka Schroeder	Skip: Irina Nizovtseva; Third: Nadezhda Beliakova; Second: Arina Piantina; Lead: Anastasiia Mishchenko; Alternate: Mariia Ermeichuk; Coach: Svetlana Iakovleva	Skip: Mihriban Polat; Third: Berivan Polat; Second: Kader Macit; Lead: Zeynep Oztemir; Alternate: Hilal Nevruz; Coach: Sadek Topaloglu	Skip: Elanur Parlayanyildiz; Third: Seyda Baris; Second: Zuhal Karaman; Lead: Beyzanur Benzer; Alternate: Mukaddes Dalaz; Coach: Zeynep Ozmen

(source:)

=== Round-robin standings ===
Official Round-robin standings

Key
Teams to Playoffs

Country	Skip	W	L
Turkey	Mihriban Polat	3	1
Russia	Irina Nizovtseva	3	1
Norway	Eline Mjoen	2	2
Poland	Daria Chmarra	2	2
Turkey 2	Elanur Parlayanyildiz	0	4

=== Round-robin results ===
All draw times are listed in (UTC+3).

==== Draw 1 ====
Monday, February 13, 15:00

Sheet C	1	2	3	4	5	6	7	8	9	Final
Poland	0	1	0	1	1	1	0	2	0	6
Russia 🔨	3	0	2	0	0	0	1	0	1	7

Sheet D	1	2	3	4	5	6	7	8	9	Final
Turkey 🔨	0	4	4	0	0	1	0	0	2	11
Norway	2	0	0	0	2	0	3	2	0	9

==== Draw 2 ====
Tuesday February 14, 9:00

Sheet C	1	2	3	4	5	6	7	8	9	Final
Norway 🔨	2	0	0	3	0	0	0	2	1	8
Turkey 2	0	1	1	0	1	3	1	0	0	7

Sheet C	1	2	3	4	5	6	7	8	Final
Turkey	2	2	1	1	0	0	0	0	6
Poland 🔨	0	0	0	0	1	4	1	1	7

Tuesday February 14, 17:00

Sheet B	1	2	3	4	5	6	7	8	Final
Norway 🔨	1	1	2	0	0	2	3	X	9
Poland	0	0	0	1	1	0	0	X	2

Sheet D	1	2	3	4	5	6	7	8	Final
Turkey	0	0	0	1	0	1	0	X	2
Russia 🔨	1	1	2	0	0	0	6	X	10

==== Draw 3 ====
Wednesday February 15, 13:00

Sheet A	1	2	3	4	5	6	7	8	Final
Turkey 2	0	1	0	0	1	0	X	X	2
Turkey 🔨	1	0	4	2	0	4	X	X	11

Sheet E	1	2	3	4	5	6	7	8	Final
Russia 🔨	0	0	1	0	2	1	1	3	8
Norway	1	1	0	2	0	0	0	0	4

==== Draw 4 ====
Thursday February 16, 9:00

Sheet B	1	2	3	4	5	6	7	8	Final
Russia	0	2	1	0	1	0	0	0	4
Turkey 🔨	1	0	0	2	0	1	0	2	6

Sheet E	1	2	3	4	5	6	7	8	Final
Poland 🔨	4	0	1	0	2	1	2	X	10
Turkey 2	0	2	0	1	0	0	0	X	3

=== Playoffs ===
Semifinals
1	Turkey	7
4	Poland	6
2	Russia	10
3	Norway	5

Gold Medal Game
1	Turkey	2
2	Russia	7
Bronze Medal Game
4	Poland	5
3	Norway	3

==== Semifinals ====
Friday, February 17, 9:00

Sheet C	1	2	3	4	5	6	7	8	Final
Poland	0	4	0	0	0	1	1	0	6
Turkey 🔨	1	0	3	1	1	0	0	1	7

Sheet A	1	2	3	4	5	6	7	8	Final
Russia 🔨	0	0	3	2	0	2	0	3	10
Norway	1	0	0	0	1	0	3	0	5

==== Bronze Medal Game ====
Friday, February 17, 14:30

Sheet D	1	2	3	4	5	6	7	8	Final
Poland	1	0	1	0	1	0	1	1	5
Norway 🔨	0	1	0	1	0	1	0	0	3

==== Gold Medal Game ====
Friday, February 17, 14:30

Sheet B	1	2	3	4	5	6	7	8	Final
Turkey 🔨	1	0	0	0	0	1	0	X	2
Russia	0	2	0	1	3	0	1	X	7

=== Final standings ===
Pos	Team	Skip	G	W	L
1st place, gold medalist(s)	Russia	Irina Nizovtseva	6	5	1
2nd place, silver medalist(s)	Turkey	Mihriban Polat	6	4	2
3rd place, bronze medalist(s)	Poland	Daria Chmarra	6	3	3
4	Norway	Eline Mjoen	6	2	4
5	Turkey 2	Elanur Parlayanyildiz	4	0	4
