= Maia Ramsfjell =

Norwegian curler (born 1999)

- Curler
- Born: 30 April 1999 (age 27); Oslo, Norway

Team
- Curling club: Stabekk CK, Stabekk
- Skip: Maia Ramsfjell
- Third: Robyn Munro
- Second: Mille Haslev Nordbye
- Lead: Eilin Kjærland

Curling career
- Member Association: Norway
- World Championship: 1 (2023)
- World Mixed Doubles Championship: 2 (2018, 2022)
- World Mixed Championship: 2 (2022, 2023)
- European Championship: 5 (2015, 2017, 2018, 2019, 2022)
- Other appearances: World Junior Championships: 3 (2018, 2019, 2020), Youth Olympic Games: 1 (2016)
Medal record
Curling
Representing Norway
World Women's Championship
Silver medal – second place	2023 Sandviken
Norwegian Women's Championship
Gold medal – first place	2018 Jar
Gold medal – first place	2019 Lillehammer
Gold medal – first place	2020 Oslo
Bronze medal – third place	2017 Jar
Norwegian Mixed Doubles Championship
Gold medal – first place	2018 Oppdal
Gold medal – first place	2020 Lillehammer
Bronze medal – third place	2019 Jar

Maia Ramsfjell (born 30 April 1999 in Oslo) is a Norwegian curler. She currently skips her own team out of Lillehammer.

At the national level, she is a three-time Norwegian women's champion, one-time Norwegian mixed champion and two-time Norwegian mixed doubles champion curler.

== Teams ==
=== Women's ===
Season	Skip	Third	Second	Lead	Alternate	Coach	Events
2014–15	Maia Ramsfjell	Martine Rønning	Mathilde Hoem	Henriette Halvorsen	Julie Kjær Molnar	Petter Moe	EJCC 2015 (5th)
2015–16	Kristin Skaslien	Anneline Skårsmoen	Julie Kjær Molnar	Kristine Davanger	Maia Ramsfjell	Ole Ingvaldsen	ECC 2015 (8th)
2016–17	Maia Ramsfjell	Martine Rønning	Mathilde Hoen	Henriette Halvorsen	Mille Haslev Nordbye		NWCC 2017 (bronze)
2017–18	Kristin Skaslien	Ingvild Skaga	Pia Trulsen	Jennifer Cunningham	Maia Ramsfjell	Petter Moe	ECC 2017 (14th)
2017–18	Maia Ramsfjell	Martine Rønning	Mille Haslev Nordbye	Victoria Hewitt Johansen			NWCC 2018 (gold)
2017–18	Maia Ramsfjell	Martine Rønning	Mille Haslev Nordbye	Eirin Mesloe	Victoria Johansen	Kai Ove Rønning	WJCC 2018 (4th)
2018–19	Kristin Skaslien	Ingvild Skaga	Pia Trulsen	Jennifer Cunningham	Maia Ramsfjell	Petter Moe	ECC 2018 (11th)
2018–19	Maia Ramsfjell	Martine Rønning	Mille Haslev Nordbye	Astri Forbregd	Eirin Mesloe	Thomas Løvold	WJCC 2019 (7th)
2018–19	Maia Ramsfjell	Martine Rønning	Mille Haslev Nordbye	Astri Forbregd			NWCC 2019 (gold)
2019–20	Kristin Skaslien	Marianne Rørvik	Maia Ramsfjell	Pia Trulsen	Martine Rønning	Petter Moe	ECC 2019 (9th)
2019–20	Maia Ramsfjell	Martine Rønning	Mille Haslev Nordbye	Astri Forbregd	Eirin Mesloe	Kai Ove Roenning	WJCC 2020 (8th)
2019–20	Maia Ramsfjell	Martine Rønning	Mille Haslev Nordbye	Astri Forbregd			NWCC 2020 (gold)
2026–27	Maia Ramsfjell	Robyn Munro	Mille Haslev Nordbye	Eilin Kjærland			

=== Mixed ===
Season	Skip	Third	Second	Lead	Coach	Events
2015–16	Michael Mellemseter (fourth)	Maia Ramsfjell (skip)	Andreas Hårstad	Eline Mjøen	Ingvild Skaga	WYOG 2016 (7th)
2015–16	Magnus Ramsfjell	Maia Ramsfjell	Eigil Ramsfjell	Mathilde Hoem		NMxCC 2016 (gold)

=== Mixed doubles ===
Season	Female	Male	Coach	Events
2015–16	(Norway) Maia Ramsfjell	(South Korea) Kim Ho-geon		WYOG 2016 (17th)
2016–17	Maia Ramsfjell	Magnus Ramsfjell		NMDCC 2017 (4th)
2017–18	Maia Ramsfjell	Magnus Ramsfjell	Thomas Løvold	NMDCC 2018 (gold); WMDCC 2018 (11th)
2018–19	Maia Ramsfjell	Magnus Ramsfjell		NMDCC 2019 (bronze)
2020–21	Maia Ramsfjell	Magnus Ramsfjell		NMDCC 2020 (gold)
2021–22	Maia Ramsfjell	Magnus Ramsfjell	Steffen Walstad	WMDCC 2022 (4th)
2022–23	Maia Ramsfjell	Magnus Ramsfjell		
2023–24	Maia Ramsfjell	Magnus Ramsfjell		

== Personal life ==
Ramsfjell is the daughter of three-time world champion and Olympic bronze medalist Eigil Ramsfjell and niece of Olympic champion Bent Ramsfjell. Her brother is Norwegian curler Magnus Ramsfjell.
