= 2026 World Women's Curling Championship =

2026 edition of the World Women's Curling Championship

- Host city: Calgary, Alberta, Canada
- Arena: Markin MacPhail Centre
- Dates: March 14–22
- Attendance: 51,019
- Winner: Switzerland
- Curling club: Grasshopper Club Zurich, Zurich
- Skip: Xenia Schwaller
- Third: Selina Gafner
- Second: Fabienne Rieder
- Lead: Selina Rychiger
- Coach: John Epping
- Finalist: Canada (Kerri Einarson)

The 2026 World Women's Curling Championship (branded as the 2026 BKT World Women's Curling Championship for sponsorship reasons) was the 47th World Women's Curling Championship that were held from March 14 to 22 at the Markin MacPhail Centre at Canada Olympic Park in Calgary, Alberta. The venue previously hosted the 2021 World Men's and Women's Championships behind closed doors as well as the 2022 Pan Continental Curling Championships.

The event saw the debut for Australia at the Women's World Championship, and also their first win, a 7–6 extra-end victory over Norway in Draw 2.

The format for the Championship features a 13-team round robin. The top six teams will qualify for the playoff round, where the top two teams receive a bye while the remaining four play in the qualification round to qualify for the semifinals.

== Qualification ==
13 curling federations qualified to participate in the 2026 World Women's Curling Championship. Of note, this was the first World Women's Championship appearance for Australia, who qualified after finishing sixth at the Pan Continental Championship.

Means of Qualification	Vacancies	Qualified
Host Nation	1	Canada
2025 Pan Continental Curling Championships	5	China; South Korea; United States; Japan; Australia
2025 European Curling Championships	7	Sweden; Scotland; Switzerland; Norway; Denmark; Turkey; Italy
TOTAL	13	

== Teams ==
The teams are as follows:

Australia (Note: Michelle Armstrong played as lead in the games of draw 8, 9, 11, 13, 14 and 19; Karen Titheridge sat out the games of draw 8 and 14, moved to 2nd in the games of draw 9 and 19, further to 3rd in the games of draw 11 and 13; Kristen Tsourlenes sat out the games of draw 9 and 19; Sara Westman sat out the games of draw 11 and 13.)	Canada (Note: Krysten Karwacki was substituted as Lead in the game of draw 19.)	China (Note: With no reasons provided, Su Tingyu replaced Dong Ziqi in the first 4 games as 2nd in the games of draw 1, 2, 4 (as substitute after 2nd end) and 5, further she played as 2nd in the game of draw 14 whilst Dong Ziqi moved to 3rd, Wang Rui to 4th, meaning Han Yu sat out.)	Denmark (Note: Due to illness, Katrine Schmidt refrained from continuing in the game of draw 7 after 5 ends und missed the games of draw 8 and 10, My Larsen missed the games of draw 18 and 20 due to illness; in all the games mentioned Denmark was forced to play with only 3 players.)	Italy
Victorian CA, Melbourne Skip: Helen Williams; Third: Sara Westman; Second: Kristen Tsourlenes; Lead: Karen Titheridge; Alternate: Michelle Fredericks Armstrong	Gimli CC, Gimli Skip: Kerri Einarson; Third: Val Sweeting; Second: Shannon Birchard; Lead: Karlee Burgess; Alternate: Krysten Karwacki	Harbin CC, Harbin Fourth: Han Yu; Skip: Wang Rui; Second: Dong Ziqi; Lead: Jiang Jiayi; Alternate: Su Tingyu	Hvidovre CC, Hvidovre & Gentofte CC, Gentofte Skip: Madeleine Dupont; Third: Mathilde Halse; Second: ~~Denise Dupont~~ Katrine Schmidt (Note: Since the regular second, Denise Dupont, had to withdraw due to an injury and former team member Jasmin Holtermann was unavailable, Katrine Schmidt has stepped in.); Lead: My Larsen	CC Dolomiti, Cortina d'Ampezzo Skip: Stefania Constantini; Third: Giulia Zardini Lacedelli; Second: Elena Mathis; Lead: Marta Lo Deserto; Alternate: Rebecca Mariani
Japan (Note: Tori Koana replaced Chinami Yoshida as 3rd in the games of draw 4, 11, 14, 17 and 20.)	Norway (Note: Mille Haslev Nordbye replaced Nora Østgård as 3rd in the game of draw 15.)	Scotland (Note: Laura Watt replaced Lisa Davie as 3rd in the games of draw 4, 6, 11, 13, 17 and 19.)	South Korea (Note: Seol Ye-ji played as Lead in the game of draw 7, and as 2nd in the game of draw 11.)	Sweden
Tokoro CC, Kitami Skip: Satsuki Fujisawa; Third: Chinami Yoshida; Second: Yumi Suzuki; Lead: Yurika Yoshida; Alternate: Tori Koana	Oppdal CK, Oppdal Skip: Torild Bjørnstad; Third: Nora Østgård; Second: Ingeborg Forbregd; Lead: Eirin Mesloe; Alternate: Mille Haslev Nordbye	Dumfries Ice Bowl, Dumfries Skip: Fay Henderson; Third: Lisa Davie; Second: Hailey Duff; Lead: Katie McMillan; Alternate: Laura Watt	Uijeongbu CC, Uijeongbu Skip: Gim Eun-ji; Third: Kim Min-ji; Second: Kim Su-ji; Lead: Seol Ye-eun; Alternate: Seol Ye-ji	Sundbybergs CK, Sundbyberg & Östersunds CK, Östersund Skip: Isabella Wranå; Third: Almida de Val; Second: Maria Larsson; Lead: Linda Stenlund; Alternate: Moa Dryburgh
Switzerland	Turkey	United States		
GC Zurich, Zurich Skip: Xenia Schwaller; Third: Selina Gafner; Second: Fabienne Rieder; Lead: Selina Rychiger	Milli Piyango CA, Erzurum Skip: Dilşat Yıldız; Third: Öznur Polat; Second: İclal Karaman; Lead: Berfin Şengül; Alternate: Melisa Cömert	Traverse City CC, Traverse City Skip: Delaney Strouse; Third: Anne O'Hara; Second: Sydney Mullaney; Lead: Madison Bear; Alternate: Taylor Anderson-Heide		

=== WCF ranking ===
Year to date World Curling Federation order of merit ranking for each team prior to the event.

Nation (Skip)	Rank	Points
South Korea (Gim)	4	318.8
Canada (Einarson)	5	286.9
Switzerland (Schwaller)	6	286.2
Japan (Fujisawa)	9	237.4
Denmark (Dupont)	12	211.6
Sweden (Wranå)	13	211.2
China (Wang)	17	180.6
Norway (Bjørnstad)	30	116.8
Italy (Constantini)	31	112.0
Turkey (Yıldız)	37	83.0
Scotland (Henderson)	40	76.8
United States (Strouse)	51	66.3
Australia (Williams)	89	23.8

== Round robin standings ==
Final Round Robin Standings

Key
Teams to Playoffs
Team Relegated to 2026 World Championship Qualifier

Country	Skip	W	L	W–L	PF	PA	EW	EL	BE	SE	S%	DSC
Switzerland	Xenia Schwaller	11	1	–	89	55	53	41	10	10	88.8%	25.214
Canada	Kerri Einarson	10	2	–	97	57	55	43	7	14	87.0%	32.891
Japan	Satsuki Fujisawa	9	3	–	84	57	53	36	6	19	82.1%	28.550
Sweden	Isabella Wranå	8	4	1–0	82	74	55	49	5	13	82.2%	24.168
South Korea	Gim Eun-ji	8	4	0–1	95	70	57	46	3	22	83.9%	50.500
Turkey	Dilşat Yıldız	7	5	–	81	84	53	47	4	16	78.7%	41.123
China	Wang Rui	6	6	–	76	66	48	47	6	12	82.9%	44.677
Italy	Stefania Constantini	5	7	–	73	85	47	48	9	9	81.1%	38.977
Norway	Torild Bjørnstad	4	8	1–0	80	84	47	49	9	8	79.9%	39.809
Scotland	Fay Henderson	4	8	0–1	74	74	42	51	10	9	80.8%	41.527
Denmark	Madeleine Dupont	3	9	–	76	96	48	56	1	9	76.6%	35.495
United States	Delaney Strouse	2	10	–	45	84	33	54	4	8	77.0%	37.732
Australia	Helen Williams	1	11	–	41	107	32	56	4	4	69.1%	61.755

Round Robin Summary Table
Pos.	Country	Australia	Canada	China	Denmark	Italy	Japan	Norway	Scotland	South Korea	Sweden	Switzerland	Turkey	United States	Record
13	Australia	—	2–11	2–8	7–11	4–9	2–7	7–6	2–12	3–12	4–7	1–10	5–7	2–7	1–11
2	Canada	11–2	—	9–3	9–6	9–6	6–5	6–10	7–5	8–3	7–5	5–6	9–3	11–3	10–2
7	China	8–2	3–9	—	7–8	10–3	7–8	5–3	7–6	4–6	4–9	5–6	10–5	6–1	6–6
11	Denmark	11–7	6–9	8–7	—	1–8	3–8	9–3	7–11	4–7	8–9	9–11	6–7	4–9	3–9
8	Italy	9–4	6–9	3–10	8–1	—	6–8	8–6	7–5	5–14	4–9	4–6	7–10	6–3	5–7
3	Japan	7–2	5–6	8–7	8–3	8–6	—	10–9	3–4	9–5	8–2	6–3	4–9	8–1	9–3
9	Norway	6–7	10–6	3–5	3–9	6–8	9–10	—	8–6	7–8	9–7	4–8	7–8	8–2	4–8
10	Scotland	12–2	5–7	6–7	11–7	5–7	4–3	6–8	—	3–8	6–8	5–9	3–5	8–3	4–8
5	South Korea	12–3	3–8	6–4	7–4	14–5	5–9	8–7	8–3	—	7–8	6–7	12–7	7–5	8–4
4	Sweden	7–4	5–7	9–4	9–8	9–4	2–8	7–9	8–6	8–7	—	3–7	8–6	7–4	8–4
1	Switzerland	10–1	6–5	6–5	11–9	6–4	3–6	8–4	9–5	7–6	7–3	—	8–5	8–2	11–1
6	Turkey	7–5	3–9	5–10	7–6	10–7	9–4	8–7	5–3	7–12	6–8	5–8	—	9–5	7–5
12	United States	7–2	3–11	1–6	9–4	3–6	1–8	2–8	3–8	5–7	4–7	2–8	5–9	—	2–10

== Round robin results ==
All draw times are listed in Mountain Time (UTC−06:00).

=== Draw 1 ===
Saturday, March 14, 2:00 pm

Sheet A	1	2	3	4	5	6	7	8	9	10	11	Final
China (Wang)	0	0	0	2	0	3	0	1	0	0	1	7
Scotland (Henderson) 🔨	0	0	2	0	1	0	1	0	0	2	0	6

Sheet B	1	2	3	4	5	6	7	8	9	10	Final
Sweden (Wranå) 🔨	2	0	0	1	0	0	0	0	2	0	5
Canada (Einarson)	0	1	1	0	1	2	0	1	0	1	7

Sheet C	1	2	3	4	5	6	7	8	9	10	11	Final
Norway (Bjørnstad) 🔨	1	0	0	0	0	2	0	0	2	2	0	7
Turkey (Yıldız)	0	0	0	2	2	0	3	0	0	0	1	8

Sheet D	1	2	3	4	5	6	7	8	9	10	Final
Japan (Fujisawa) 🔨	0	1	1	0	1	0	2	0	1	X	6
Switzerland (Schwaller)	0	0	0	0	0	1	0	2	0	X	3

=== Draw 2 ===
Saturday, March 14, 7:00 pm

Sheet A	1	2	3	4	5	6	7	8	9	10	Final
Italy (Constantini) 🔨	0	0	0	3	0	2	0	0	0	X	5
South Korea (Gim)	0	2	4	0	1	0	2	1	4	X	14

Sheet B	1	2	3	4	5	6	7	8	9	10	Final
China (Wang)	0	2	1	0	0	1	0	1	0	0	5
Switzerland (Schwaller) 🔨	2	0	0	2	0	0	1	0	0	1	6

Sheet C	1	2	3	4	5	6	7	8	9	10	Final
Australia (Williams) 🔨	1	0	0	2	0	2	0	2	0	0	7
Denmark (Dupont)	0	1	1	0	2	0	3	0	2	2	11

Sheet D	1	2	3	4	5	6	7	8	9	10	Final
United States (Strouse)	0	0	1	0	2	0	0	0	X	X	3
Canada (Einarson) 🔨	0	1	0	3	0	2	4	1	X	X	11

=== Draw 3 ===
Sunday, March 15, 8:30 am

Sheet A	1	2	3	4	5	6	7	8	9	10	Final
Denmark (Dupont)	0	1	0	0	2	0	3	0	2	0	8
Sweden (Wranå) 🔨	1	0	3	1	0	1	0	1	0	2	9

Sheet B	1	2	3	4	5	6	7	8	9	10	Final
South Korea (Gim)	0	0	0	0	3	0	2	0	0	X	5
Japan (Fujisawa) 🔨	0	1	1	1	0	3	0	1	2	X	9

Sheet C	1	2	3	4	5	6	7	8	9	10	Final
Scotland (Henderson) 🔨	2	1	1	1	0	0	0	3	X	X	8
United States (Strouse)	0	0	0	0	1	1	1	0	X	X	3

Sheet D	1	2	3	4	5	6	7	8	9	10	11	Final
Australia (Williams) 🔨	0	0	0	1	1	2	0	1	1	0	1	7
Norway (Bjørnstad)	0	3	0	0	0	0	1	0	0	2	0	6

=== Draw 4 ===
Sunday, March 15, 1:30 pm

Sheet A	1	2	3	4	5	6	7	8	9	10	11	Final
Japan (Fujisawa)	0	0	2	0	1	0	4	2	0	0	1	10
Norway (Bjørnstad) 🔨	0	3	0	2	0	1	0	0	2	1	0	9

Sheet B	1	2	3	4	5	6	7	8	9	10	Final
Turkey (Yıldız)	0	0	1	0	0	2	0	1	0	1	5
Scotland (Henderson) 🔨	0	1	0	1	0	0	1	0	0	0	3

Sheet C	1	2	3	4	5	6	7	8	9	10	Final
Canada (Einarson) 🔨	2	0	1	0	3	1	0	2	X	X	9
China (Wang)	0	1	0	1	0	0	1	0	X	X	3

Sheet D	1	2	3	4	5	6	7	8	9	10	Final
Sweden (Wranå) 🔨	3	0	1	0	2	0	0	2	1	X	9
Italy (Constantini)	0	1	0	2	0	0	1	0	0	X	4

=== Draw 5 ===
Sunday, March 15, 6:30 pm

Sheet A	1	2	3	4	5	6	7	8	9	10	Final
United States (Strouse) 🔨	0	2	0	3	0	0	0	0	0	X	5
Turkey (Yıldız)	1	0	1	0	2	1	0	2	2	X	9

Sheet B	1	2	3	4	5	6	7	8	9	10	Final
Italy (Constantini) 🔨	2	0	1	0	1	0	2	1	2	X	9
Australia (Williams)	0	1	0	1	0	2	0	0	0	X	4

Sheet C	1	2	3	4	5	6	7	8	9	10	Final
Switzerland (Schwaller) 🔨	0	0	2	0	2	0	1	0	0	2	7
South Korea (Gim)	0	1	0	1	0	2	0	2	0	0	6

Sheet D	1	2	3	4	5	6	7	8	9	10	11	Final
Denmark (Dupont) 🔨	1	0	0	1	1	0	2	0	2	0	1	8
China (Wang)	0	1	2	0	0	1	0	1	0	2	0	7

=== Draw 6 ===
Monday, March 16, 9:00 am

Sheet A	1	2	3	4	5	6	7	8	9	10	Final
Scotland (Henderson)	0	2	0	3	0	0	0	0	0	X	5
Switzerland (Schwaller) 🔨	2	0	2	0	0	2	1	0	2	X	9

Sheet B	1	2	3	4	5	6	7	8	9	10	Final
Norway (Bjørnstad)	0	1	0	2	2	0	0	2	0	2	9
Sweden (Wranå) 🔨	2	0	3	0	0	1	0	0	1	0	7

Sheet C	1	2	3	4	5	6	7	8	9	10	Final
United States (Strouse) 🔨	0	0	3	0	0	3	0	1	X	X	7
Australia (Williams)	0	0	0	0	1	0	1	0	X	X	2

=== Draw 7 ===
Monday, March 16, 2:00 pm

Sheet A	1	2	3	4	5	6	7	8	9	10	Final
Norway (Bjørnstad) 🔨	1	1	0	1	0	3	0	1	0	0	7
South Korea (Gim)	0	0	2	0	1	0	2	0	2	1	8

Sheet B	1	2	3	4	5	6	7	8	9	10	Final
Canada (Einarson) 🔨	2	0	1	0	2	0	0	1	0	3	9
Denmark (Dupont)	0	2	0	2	0	1	0	0	1	0	6

Sheet C	1	2	3	4	5	6	7	8	9	10	Final
China (Wang)	0	0	2	0	2	0	3	3	X	X	10
Italy (Constantini) 🔨	0	1	0	1	0	1	0	0	X	X	3

Sheet D	1	2	3	4	5	6	7	8	9	10	Final
Turkey (Yıldız) 🔨	1	0	3	0	3	0	0	2	X	X	9
Japan (Fujisawa)	0	1	0	1	0	1	1	0	X	X	4

=== Draw 8 ===
Monday, March 16, 7:00 pm

Sheet A	1	2	3	4	5	6	7	8	9	10	Final
Australia (Williams) 🔨	0	0	0	1	0	2	0	1	0	X	4
Sweden (Wranå)	1	1	1	0	2	0	2	0	0	X	7

Sheet B	1	2	3	4	5	6	7	8	9	10	Final
Switzerland (Schwaller) 🔨	1	0	0	3	0	0	2	0	2	X	8
Turkey (Yıldız)	0	1	1	0	1	0	0	2	0	X	5

Sheet C	1	2	3	4	5	6	7	8	9	10	Final
Denmark (Dupont) 🔨	1	1	0	0	3	0	0	2	0	X	7
Scotland (Henderson)	0	0	5	1	0	1	3	0	1	X	11

Sheet D	1	2	3	4	5	6	7	8	9	10	11	Final
South Korea (Gim) 🔨	0	0	2	0	1	0	0	1	1	0	2	7
United States (Strouse)	0	0	0	1	0	1	1	0	0	2	0	5

=== Draw 9 ===
Tuesday, March 17, 9:00 am

Sheet B	1	2	3	4	5	6	7	8	9	10	11	Final
Sweden (Wranå) 🔨	1	1	0	1	0	0	2	0	1	0	2	8
Scotland (Henderson)	0	0	1	0	2	0	0	1	0	2	0	6

Sheet C	1	2	3	4	5	6	7	8	9	10	Final
Japan (Fujisawa) 🔨	2	0	1	2	0	2	X	X	X	X	7
Australia (Williams)	0	0	0	0	2	0	X	X	X	X	2

Sheet D	1	2	3	4	5	6	7	8	9	10	Final
Italy (Constantini)	0	2	1	0	1	0	1	0	1	X	6
Canada (Einarson) 🔨	2	0	0	1	0	2	0	4	0	X	9

=== Draw 10 ===
Tuesday, March 17, 2:00 pm

Sheet A	1	2	3	4	5	6	7	8	9	10	Final
South Korea (Gim)	0	0	2	4	0	3	0	3	X	X	12
Turkey (Yıldız) 🔨	1	2	0	0	2	0	2	0	X	X	7

Sheet B	1	2	3	4	5	6	7	8	9	10	Final
United States (Strouse)	0	0	0	0	0	0	0	1	0	X	1
China (Wang) 🔨	0	0	0	1	1	1	1	0	2	X	6

Sheet C	1	2	3	4	5	6	7	8	9	10	11	Final
Italy (Constantini) 🔨	1	0	0	0	0	3	0	2	0	0	2	8
Norway (Bjørnstad)	0	0	2	0	0	0	2	0	1	1	0	6

Sheet D	1	2	3	4	5	6	7	8	9	10	Final
Switzerland (Schwaller) 🔨	2	0	5	0	1	0	0	1	0	2	11
Denmark (Dupont)	0	2	0	3	0	1	1	0	2	0	9

=== Draw 11 ===
Tuesday, March 17, 7:00 pm

Sheet A	1	2	3	4	5	6	7	8	9	10	11	Final
Canada (Einarson)	0	0	1	0	1	0	0	1	0	2	0	5
Switzerland (Schwaller) 🔨	1	0	0	1	0	1	1	0	1	0	1	6

Sheet B	1	2	3	4	5	6	7	8	9	10	Final
Australia (Williams)	0	0	1	0	2	0	0	0	X	X	3
South Korea (Gim) 🔨	2	1	0	3	0	1	1	4	X	X	12

Sheet C	1	2	3	4	5	6	7	8	9	10	Final
Sweden (Wranå) 🔨	0	1	0	3	1	0	0	0	2	X	7
United States (Strouse)	0	0	1	0	0	1	1	1	0	X	4

Sheet D	1	2	3	4	5	6	7	8	9	10	Final
Scotland (Henderson)	0	0	0	1	1	0	0	1	0	1	4
Japan (Fujisawa) 🔨	0	1	0	0	0	0	1	0	1	0	3

=== Draw 12 ===
Wednesday, March 18, 9:00 am

Sheet A	1	2	3	4	5	6	7	8	9	10	Final
Denmark (Dupont) 🔨	2	2	0	3	2	0	X	X	X	X	9
Norway (Bjørnstad)	0	0	2	0	0	1	X	X	X	X	3

Sheet B	1	2	3	4	5	6	7	8	9	10	Final
Japan (Fujisawa) 🔨	2	0	0	3	0	2	1	0	0	X	8
Italy (Constantini)	0	0	1	0	3	0	0	0	2	X	6

Sheet C	1	2	3	4	5	6	7	8	9	10	Final
Turkey (Yıldız) 🔨	0	2	1	0	0	0	X	X	X	X	3
Canada (Einarson)	3	0	0	2	2	2	X	X	X	X	9

Sheet D	1	2	3	4	5	6	7	8	9	10	Final
China (Wang) 🔨	0	0	1	0	3	0	0	0	0	X	4
Sweden (Wranå)	1	1	0	2	0	2	1	1	1	X	9

=== Draw 13 ===
Wednesday, March 18, 2:00 pm

Sheet A	1	2	3	4	5	6	7	8	9	10	Final
United States (Strouse) 🔨	1	0	0	1	0	1	0	0	0	X	3
Italy (Constantini)	0	1	1	0	1	0	1	1	1	X	6

Sheet B	1	2	3	4	5	6	7	8	9	10	Final
Denmark (Dupont)	0	0	0	2	0	2	0	0	1	1	6
Turkey (Yıldız) 🔨	0	1	1	0	2	0	1	2	0	0	7

Sheet C	1	2	3	4	5	6	7	8	9	10	Final
South Korea (Gim)	1	0	1	1	1	0	1	1	2	X	8
Scotland (Henderson) 🔨	0	0	0	0	0	3	0	0	0	X	3

Sheet D	1	2	3	4	5	6	7	8	9	10	Final
Switzerland (Schwaller) 🔨	2	3	2	1	0	2	X	X	X	X	10
Australia (Williams)	0	0	0	0	1	0	X	X	X	X	1

=== Draw 14 ===
Wednesday, March 18, 7:00 pm

Sheet A	1	2	3	4	5	6	7	8	9	10	Final
Sweden (Wranå)	0	0	0	2	0	0	X	X	X	X	2
Japan (Fujisawa) 🔨	0	3	1	0	2	2	X	X	X	X	8

Sheet B	1	2	3	4	5	6	7	8	9	10	Final
Scotland (Henderson)	0	1	0	2	0	2	0	0	0	X	5
Canada (Einarson) 🔨	2	0	2	0	1	0	0	1	1	X	7

Sheet C	1	2	3	4	5	6	7	8	9	10	Final
Australia (Williams)	0	0	1	0	1	0	X	X	X	X	2
China (Wang) 🔨	2	1	0	3	0	2	X	X	X	X	8

Sheet D	1	2	3	4	5	6	7	8	9	10	Final
Norway (Bjørnstad) 🔨	0	5	0	2	1	0	X	X	X	X	8
United States (Strouse)	0	0	1	0	0	1	X	X	X	X	2

=== Draw 15 ===
Thursday, March 19, 9:00 am

Sheet A	1	2	3	4	5	6	7	8	9	10	Final
Turkey (Yıldız)	0	1	0	3	0	0	1	0	X	X	5
China (Wang) 🔨	1	0	1	0	3	3	0	2	X	X	10

Sheet B	1	2	3	4	5	6	7	8	9	10	Final
Switzerland (Schwaller) 🔨	2	0	2	1	0	0	1	0	2	X	8
Norway (Bjørnstad)	0	1	0	0	0	2	0	1	0	X	4

Sheet C	1	2	3	4	5	6	7	8	9	10	Final
Italy (Constantini) 🔨	0	0	2	0	5	1	X	X	X	X	8
Denmark (Dupont)	0	0	0	1	0	0	X	X	X	X	1

Sheet D	1	2	3	4	5	6	7	8	9	10	Final
Canada (Einarson) 🔨	1	0	2	0	3	1	0	1	X	X	8
South Korea (Gim)	0	1	0	1	0	0	1	0	X	X	3

=== Draw 16 ===
Thursday, March 19, 2:00 pm

Sheet A	1	2	3	4	5	6	7	8	9	10	Final
Scotland (Henderson)	0	2	3	0	5	2	X	X	X	X	12
Australia (Williams) 🔨	1	0	0	1	0	0	X	X	X	X	2

Sheet B	1	2	3	4	5	6	7	8	9	10	11	Final
South Korea (Gim)	0	1	0	0	1	1	0	2	0	2	0	7
Sweden (Wranå) 🔨	2	0	1	1	0	0	1	0	2	0	1	8

Sheet C	1	2	3	4	5	6	7	8	9	10	Final
United States (Strouse) 🔨	0	1	0	0	1	0	0	0	X	X	2
Switzerland (Schwaller)	1	0	0	1	0	3	1	2	X	X	8

Sheet D	1	2	3	4	5	6	7	8	9	10	Final
Japan (Fujisawa)	0	0	0	2	0	2	1	2	1	X	8
Denmark (Dupont) 🔨	0	1	1	0	1	0	0	0	0	X	3

=== Draw 17 ===
Thursday, March 19, 7:00 pm

Sheet A	1	2	3	4	5	6	7	8	9	10	11	Final
Norway (Bjørnstad) 🔨	1	0	0	2	1	0	1	0	1	0	4	10
Canada (Einarson)	0	0	1	0	0	2	0	1	0	2	0	6

Sheet B	1	2	3	4	5	6	7	8	9	10	11	Final
China (Wang)	0	1	2	0	1	1	0	0	1	1	0	7
Japan (Fujisawa) 🔨	3	0	0	2	0	0	0	2	0	0	1	8

Sheet C	1	2	3	4	5	6	7	8	9	10	11	Final
Turkey (Yıldız) 🔨	1	0	0	1	0	1	0	2	0	1	0	6
Sweden (Wranå)	0	0	2	0	1	0	1	0	2	0	2	8

Sheet D	1	2	3	4	5	6	7	8	9	10	Final
Italy (Constantini)	0	0	1	0	0	3	0	2	1	X	7
Scotland (Henderson) 🔨	0	1	0	2	1	0	1	0	0	X	5

=== Draw 18 ===
Friday, March 20, 9:00 am

Sheet A	1	2	3	4	5	6	7	8	9	10	Final
Switzerland (Schwaller) 🔨	0	1	0	2	0	1	0	0	2	0	6
Italy (Constantini)	0	0	1	0	1	0	1	0	0	1	4

Sheet B	1	2	3	4	5	6	7	8	9	10	Final
Denmark (Dupont) 🔨	1	0	1	0	0	0	0	2	0	X	4
United States (Strouse)	0	1	0	1	1	1	1	0	4	X	9

Sheet C	1	2	3	4	5	6	7	8	9	10	Final
China (Wang)	0	0	1	0	2	0	0	0	1	X	4
South Korea (Gim) 🔨	0	1	0	1	0	2	1	1	0	X	6

Sheet D	1	2	3	4	5	6	7	8	9	10	Final
Australia (Williams)	0	1	0	1	1	0	0	2	0	0	5
Turkey (Yıldız) 🔨	1	0	1	0	0	2	1	0	1	1	7

=== Draw 19 ===
Friday, March 20, 2:00 pm

Sheet A	1	2	3	4	5	6	7	8	9	10	Final
Japan (Fujisawa) 🔨	1	2	1	0	1	0	3	X	X	X	8
United States (Strouse)	0	0	0	1	0	0	0	X	X	X	1

Sheet B	1	2	3	4	5	6	7	8	9	10	Final
Canada (Einarson)	3	0	5	1	0	2	X	X	X	X	11
Australia (Williams) 🔨	0	1	0	0	1	0	X	X	X	X	2

Sheet C	1	2	3	4	5	6	7	8	9	10	Final
Scotland (Henderson)	0	0	0	1	0	0	4	0	1	0	6
Norway (Bjørnstad) 🔨	0	0	3	0	2	0	0	2	0	1	8

Sheet D	1	2	3	4	5	6	7	8	9	10	Final
Sweden (Wranå)	0	1	0	1	0	0	1	0	X	X	3
Switzerland (Schwaller) 🔨	2	0	1	0	0	3	0	1	X	X	7

=== Draw 20 ===
Friday, March 20, 7:00 pm

Sheet A	1	2	3	4	5	6	7	8	9	10	Final
South Korea (Gim)	0	1	0	1	1	1	0	3	0	X	7
Denmark (Dupont) 🔨	1	0	1	0	0	0	1	0	1	X	4

Sheet B	1	2	3	4	5	6	7	8	9	10	Final
Turkey (Yıldız)	3	0	0	1	1	0	2	0	2	1	10
Italy (Constantini) 🔨	0	1	1	0	0	2	0	3	0	0	7

Sheet C	1	2	3	4	5	6	7	8	9	10	Final
Canada (Einarson) 🔨	1	1	0	0	0	2	0	2	0	0	6
Japan (Fujisawa)	0	0	1	0	0	0	2	0	1	1	5

Sheet D	1	2	3	4	5	6	7	8	9	10	Final
Norway (Bjørnstad) 🔨	0	1	0	0	1	0	0	1	0	X	3
China (Wang)	0	0	0	1	0	2	2	0	0	X	5

== Playoffs ==
Qualification games
4	Sweden	9
5	South Korea	5
3	Japan	7
6	Turkey	5

Semifinals
1	Switzerland	8
4	Sweden	5
2	Canada	11
3	Japan	3

Final
1	Switzerland	7
2	Canada	5
Bronze medal game
4	Sweden	8
3	Japan	5

=== Qualification Games ===
Saturday, March 21, 10:00 am

Sheet B	1	2	3	4	5	6	7	8	9	10	Final
Japan (Fujisawa) 🔨	1	0	2	0	0	0	3	0	0	1	7
Turkey (Yıldız)	0	1	0	0	0	3	0	1	0	0	5

Player percentages
Japan		Turkey	
Yurika Yoshida	84%	Berfin Şengül	79%
Yumi Suzuki	76%	İclal Karaman	78%
Chinami Yoshida	81%	Öznur Polat	71%
Satsuki Fujisawa	70%	Dilşat Yıldız	83%
Total	78%	Total	78%

Sheet D	1	2	3	4	5	6	7	8	9	10	Final
Sweden (Wranå) 🔨	0	1	0	2	2	0	1	1	0	2	9
South Korea (Gim)	0	0	1	0	0	2	0	0	2	0	5

Player percentages
Sweden		South Korea	
Linda Stenlund	94%	Seol Ye-eun	90%
Maria Larsson	83%	Kim Su-ji	85%
Almida de Val	80%	Kim Min-ji	99%
Isabella Wranå	88%	Gim Eun-ji	74%
Total	86%	Total	87%

=== Semifinals ===
Saturday, March 21, 4:00 pm

Sheet B	1	2	3	4	5	6	7	8	9	10	Final
Switzerland (Schwaller) 🔨	1	0	2	0	0	3	0	2	0	X	8
Sweden (Wranå)	0	2	0	0	1	0	1	0	1	X	5

Player percentages
Switzerland		Sweden	
Selina Rychiger	91%	Linda Stenlund	86%
Fabienne Rieder	93%	Maria Larsson	93%
Selina Gafner	91%	Almida de Val	96%
Xenia Schwaller	96%	Isabella Wranå	81%
Total	93%	Total	89%

Sheet D	1	2	3	4	5	6	7	8	9	10	Final
Canada (Einarson) 🔨	3	0	2	2	0	0	3	1	X	X	11
Japan (Fujisawa)	0	1	0	0	1	1	0	0	X	X	3

Player percentages
Canada		Japan	
Karlee Burgess	100%	Yurika Yoshida	86%
Shannon Birchard	84%	Yumi Suzuki	63%
Val Sweeting	86%	Chinami Yoshida	70%
Kerri Einarson	77%	Satsuki Fujisawa	48%
Total	87%	Total	67%

=== Bronze medal game ===
Sunday, March 22, 9:00 am

Sheet C	1	2	3	4	5	6	7	8	9	10	Final
Sweden (Wranå)	0	1	0	1	1	0	0	5	0	X	8
Japan (Fujisawa) 🔨	1	0	1	0	0	1	0	0	2	X	5

Player percentages
Sweden		Japan	
Linda Stenlund	82%	Yurika Yoshida	88%
Maria Larsson	85%	Yumi Suzuki	76%
Almida de Val	89%	Chinami Yoshida	85%
Isabella Wranå	88%	Satsuki Fujisawa	74%
Total	86%	Total	81%

=== Final ===
Sunday, March 22, 3:00 pm

Sheet C	1	2	3	4	5	6	7	8	9	10	Final
Switzerland (Schwaller) 🔨	0	2	0	0	2	0	0	2	0	1	7
Canada (Einarson)	0	0	0	2	0	1	1	0	1	0	5

Player percentages
Switzerland		Canada	
Selina Rychiger	93%	Karlee Burgess	96%
Fabienne Rieder	91%	Shannon Birchard	81%
Selina Gafner	85%	Val Sweeting	85%
Xenia Schwaller	84%	Kerri Einarson	80%
Total	88%	Total	86%

== Statistics ==
=== Player percentages ===
Final Round Robin Percentages; Minimum 5 games played

Key
All-Star Team

Leads	%
(Canada) Karlee Burgess	93.6
(Switzerland) Selina Rychiger	91.9
(Sweden) Linda Stenlund	91.6
(China) Jiang Jiayi	90.3
(South Korea) Seol Ye-eun	90.3
(Scotland) Katie McMillan	88.3
(Italy) Marta Lo Deserto	87.2
(Norway) Eirin Mesloe	86.7
(Turkey) Berfin Şengül	86.3
(United States) Madison Bear	85.8
(Japan) Yurika Yoshida	85.0
(Denmark) My Larsen	82.2
(Australia) Michelle Armstrong (Note: Played in six games)	80.5
(Australia) Karen Titheridge	75.8

Seconds	%
(Switzerland) Fabienne Rieder	89.1
(Canada) Shannon Birchard	89.0
(China) Su Tingyu (Note: Played in five games)	84.4
(Japan) Yumi Suzuki	82.4
(South Korea) Kim Su-ji	82.1
(China) Dong Ziqi	81.2
(Sweden) Maria Larsson	81.1
(Norway) Ingeborg Forbregd	80.3
(Italy) Elena Mathis	80.1
(Scotland) Hailey Duff	79.5
(Denmark) Katrine Schmidt	77.8
(United States) Sydney Mullaney	76.3
(Turkey) İclal Karaman	73.0
(Australia) Kristen Tsourlenes	60.7

Thirds	%
(Switzerland) Selina Gafner	88.9
(Scotland) Lisa Davie	85.1
(Canada) Val Sweeting	83.1
(Japan) Chinami Yoshida	81.6
(Sweden) Almida de Val	81.3
(South Korea) Kim Min-ji	80.5
(Italy) Giulia Zardini Lacedelli	80.0
(Turkey) Öznur Polat	79.7
(China) Wang Rui (Skip)	78.5
(United States) Anne O'Hara	77.5
(Denmark) Mathilde Halse	76.3
(Japan) Tori Koana	76.3
(Norway) Nora Østgård	76.3
(Scotland) Laura Watt	76.1
(Australia) Sara Westman	75.2

Skips	%
(Switzerland) Xenia Schwaller	85.2
(Canada) Kerri Einarson	82.5
(South Korea) Gim Eun-ji	82.4
(Japan) Satsuki Fujisawa	81.5
(China) Han Yu (Fourth)	80.4
(Italy) Stefania Constantini	77.0
(Norway) Torild Bjørnstad	76.4
(Turkey) Dilşat Yıldız	75.7
(Scotland) Fay Henderson	74.9
(Sweden) Isabella Wranå	74.9
(Denmark) Madeleine Dupont	70.6
(United States) Delaney Strouse	68.2
(Australia) Helen Williams	60.5

=== Perfect games ===
Minimum 10 shots thrown

Player	Team	Position	Shots	Opponent
Shannon Birchard	Canada	Second	16	China
Yurika Yoshida	Japan	Lead	16	Turkey
Fabienne Rieder	Switzerland	Second	12	Australia
Jiang Jiayi	China	Lead	12	Australia
Kerri Einarson	Canada	Skip	12	Australia

== Awards ==
The awards and all-star team are as follows:

All-Star Team

- Fourth: Xenia Schwaller, Switzerland
- Third: Selina Gafner, Switzerland
- Second: Fabienne Rieder, Switzerland
- Lead: Karlee Burgess, Canada

Frances Brodie Sportsmanship Award

- Chinami Yoshida, Japan

== Final standings ==
Key
Team Relegated to 2026 World Championship Qualifier

Place	Team
1st place, gold medalist(s)	Switzerland
2nd place, silver medalist(s)	Canada
3rd place, bronze medalist(s)	Sweden
4	Japan
5	South Korea
6	Turkey
7	China
8	Italy
9	Norway
10	Scotland
11	Denmark
12	United States
13	Australia

== National playdowns ==
- (South Korea) 2025 Korean Curling Championships
- (Canada) 2026 Scotties Tournament of Hearts
- 2026 United States Women's Curling Championship
