= Martine Rønning =

Norwegian curler (born 1999)

- Curler
- Born: 17 December 1999 (age 26); Lillehammer, Norway

Team
- Curling club: Lillehammer CK, Lillehammer

Curling career
- Member Association: Norway
- World Championship: 3 (2022, 2023, 2024)
- World Mixed Doubles Championship: 1 (2023)
- World Mixed Championship: 1 (2024)
- European Championship: 4 (2019, 2021, 2022, 2023)
Medal record
Curling
Representing Norway
World Championships
Silver medal – second place	2023 Sandviken
European Championships
Bronze medal – third place	2023 Aberdeen
World Mixed Doubles Championship
Bronze medal – third place	2023 Gangneung

Martine Vollan Rønning (born 17 December 1999) is a Norwegian curler from Lillehammer.

== Career ==
=== Juniors ===
Rønning made her international debut at the 2015 European Junior Curling Challenge as the alternate on the Norwegian team skipped by Maia Ramsfjell. After a 5–1 round robin record, the team lost in the quarterfinal round to Italy.

Rønning joined the Norwegian junior women's curling team as the third for the 2015–16 season. The team, skipped by Mari Forbregd, played in the 2016 World Junior B Curling Championships where they finished with a 2–4 record, missing the playoff round. She then rejoined the Maia Ramsfjell rink the following season with second Mille Haslev Nordbye, lead Victoria Johansen and alternate Eirin Mesloe. In her second season with the team, they finished third at the 2018 World Junior B Curling Championships. This qualified them for the 2018 World Junior Curling Championships, where they were able to reach the playoffs with a 5–4 record. The team then lost in the semifinal and bronze medal game, settling for fourth place. They ended the season by winning the 2018 Norwegian Women's Curling Championship. Because of their high placement at the 2018 championship, the team earned direct qualification into the 2019 World Junior Curling Championships. There, they finished in seventh place with a 3–6 record, enough to avoid relegation to the B Championship. They also won their second straight Norwegian women's championship title.

Team Ramsfjell remained as the junior representatives for the 2019–20 season. On tour, the team won their first World Curling Tour event at the WCT Latvian International Challenger. At the 2020 World Junior Curling Championships, the team finished in eighth place, again with a 3–6 record. They ended their season with their third consecutive Norwegian women's title. Also during the 2019–20 season, Rønning was the alternate on the Norwegian women's team skipped by Marianne Rørvik at the 2019 European Curling Championships, her first appearance at the event. There, the team played in the A Division where they finished with a 2–7 record. Despite being listed as the alternate, Rønning played in five games for the team, including their two victories. After the season, Rønning left the junior team to join Rørvik's Norwegian women's team, also including third Mille Haslev Nordbye and second Eli Skaslien.

=== Women's ===
Team Rørvik began the 2021–22 season representing Norway at the 2021 Pre-Olympic Qualification Event. There, the team went 3–1 in the round robin, however, did not advance to the playoffs due to their draw shot challenge. The team then represented Norway at the 2021 European Curling Championships B Division where they went 7–2 through the round robin. This qualified them for the semifinal where they beat England 10–4 before winning 10–7 over Latvia in the gold medal game, securing promotion into the 2022 A Division. The first-place finish also qualified them for the 2022 World Qualification Event for the chance to qualify for the 2022 World Women's Curling Championship. At the event, the Norwegian team went a perfect 6–0 through the round robin to earn the top spot in the playoff round. They then lost to Denmark, before beating Latvia to earn a spot at the Women's Championship. There, the team went 5–7 in the round robin, finishing in eighth place. Also during the 2021–22 season, the team finished second at the 2022 Norwegian Women's Curling Championship to Eirin Mesloe.

In their first event of the 2022–23 season, Team Rørvik finished second at the 2022 Euro Super Series to Germany's Daniela Jentsch. At the 2022 European Curling Championships, the team competed in the A Division where they missed the playoffs with a 4–5 record. Despite their eighth-place finish, it was enough to qualify for the 2023 World Women's Curling Championship. In the new year, the team lost the final of the 2023 Mercure Perth Masters before defeating Anna Hasselborg in the final of the Sun City Cup. The weekend before the World Championships, the team won the 2023 Norwegian Women's Championship. At Worlds, the team had Norway's best result at a women's world championship since 2004. They finished second through the round robin with a strong 8–4 record, earning a bye directly to the semifinals. There, they upset Canada's Kerri Einarson 8–5 to qualify for the world final against Switzerland's Silvana Tirinzoni. Despite out curling the Swiss team by two percent, Norwegian fourth Kristin Skaslien missed the rings on her final draw, with the Swiss stealing two and winning the game 6–3. The team ended their season at the 2023 Champions Cup Grand Slam event, which they qualified for by winning the Sun City Cup. They finished 1–4, with their lone win ironically coming against Team Tirinzoni.

The Rørvik rink found major success during the 2023–24 season, qualifying for the playoffs in five of their seven tour events. The team began with a semifinal finish at the 2023 Euro Super Series before reaching the final of the 2023 Oslo Cup where they came up short against Anna Hasselborg. After a quarterfinal loss at the 2023 Women's Masters Basel, the team competed in the 2023 Tour Challenge Tier 1 Slam event. There, they went 1–3, only managing to beat Scotland's Rebecca Morrison. Before the European championship, the team finished third at the Danish Open following a semifinal loss to Anna Kubešková. At the 2023 European Curling Championships, Team Rørvik had a successful run, finishing 6–3 through the round robin and earning a spot in the playoffs. After losing the semifinal to Switzerland's Team Tirinzoni, they bounced back with a big 10–3 win over Sweden's Isabella Wranå in the bronze medal game. In preparation for the world championship, the team played in the 2024 Cortina Curling Cup where they finished third and the Sun City Cup where they lost out to Team Wranå. Their season concluded with the 2024 World Women's Curling Championship in Sydney, Nova Scotia. There, they could not replicate their success from 2023, finishing in ninth place with a 4–8 record.

=== Mixed doubles ===
Aside from women's curling, Rønning competes in mixed doubles with Mathias Brænden. During the 2022–23 season, the pair won two tour events at the WCT Tallinn Mixed Doubles International and the WCT Tallinn Masters Mixed Doubles. They also won the Norwegian Mixed Doubles Curling Championship, qualifying to represent Norway at the 2023 World Mixed Doubles Curling Championship. There, the pair qualified for the playoffs with a 7–2 record. They then defeated Estonia in a qualification game before dropping the semifinal to Japan. In the bronze medal game, they won 6–2 over Canada's Jennifer Jones and Brent Laing. The following season, Rønning and Brænden found more success on tour, winning the British Curling Mixed Doubles Super Series and the Halifax Mixed Doubles Super Series. They also finished second at the WCT Tallinn Mixed Doubles International after a previously undefeated record. Despite their strong tour season, the team could not get past Rønning's teammate Kristin Skaslien and Magnus Nedregotten in the Norwegian final, finishing second.

== Personal life ==
Rønning is a student.

== Teams ==
Season	Skip	Third	Second	Lead	Alternate
2014–15	Maia Ramsfjell	Martine Rønning	Mathilde Hoem	Henriette Halvorsen	Julie Kjær Molnar
2015–16	Mari Forbregd	Eline Mjøen	Astri Forbregd	Hannah Skarsheim Rian	Martine Rønning
2016–17	Maia Ramsfjell	Martine Rønning	Mille Haslev Nordbye	Victoria Johansen	Eirin Mesloe
2017–18	Maia Ramsfjell	Martine Rønning	Mille Haslev Nordbye	Eirin Mesloe	Victoria Johansen
2018–19	Maia Ramsfjell	Martine Rønning	Mille Haslev Nordbye	Astri Forbregd	Eirin Mesloe
2019–20	Maia Ramsfjell	Martine Rønning	Mille Haslev Nordbye	Astri Forbregd	Eirin Mesloe
2020–21	Marianne Rørvik	Mille Haslev Nordbye	Eli Skaslien	Martine Rønning	
2021–22	Kristin Skaslien (Fourth)	Marianne Rørvik (Skip)	Mille Haslev Nordbye	Martine Rønning	Eirin Mesloe
2022–23	Kristin Skaslien (Fourth)	Marianne Rørvik (Skip)	Mille Haslev Nordbye	Martine Rønning	Maia Ramsfjell
2023–24	Kristin Skaslien (Fourth)	Marianne Rørvik (Skip)	Mille Haslev Nordbye	Martine Rønning	Ingeborg Forbregd
