= Torild Bjørnstad =

Norwegian curler

- Curler ♀
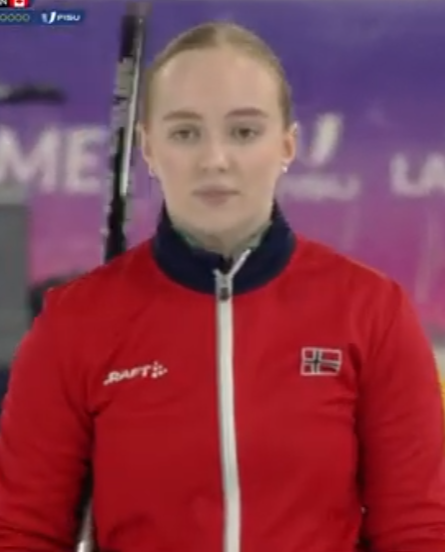
- Born: 2003 (age 22–23); Trondheim, Norway

Team
- Curling club: Oppdal CK, Oppdal
- Skip: Torild Bjørnstad
- Third: Nora Østgård
- Second: Ingeborg Forbregd
- Lead: Eirin Mesloe
- Alternate: Mille Haslev Nordbye

Curling career
- Member Association: Norway
- World Championship: 1 (2026)
- European Championship: 1 (2026)
- World Junior Curling Championship: 4 (2022, 2023, 2024, 2025)
- Other appearances: Winter World University Games: 1 (2025)
Medal record
Curling
World Junior Championships
Bronze medal – third place	2023 Füssen
Bronze medal – third place	2024 Lohja
Norwegian Women's Championship
Gold medal – first place	2022 Haugesund
Gold medal – first place	2024 Oslo
Gold medal – first place	2025 Halden
Silver medal – second place	2026 Lillehammer
Bronze medal – third place	2019 Lillehammer
Bronze medal – third place	2023 Lillehammer

Torild Bjørnstad (born 2003) is a Norwegian curler from Trondheim. She is a two-time World Junior bronze medallist.

== Career ==
=== Youth ===
Bjørnstad first represented Norway at the international level at the 2019 European Youth Olympic Winter Festival, playing lead on a team skipped by Nicolai Sommervold. There, the team finished with a 1–5 record in pool play.

Bjørnstad has represented Norway in four World Junior Curling Championships. She first played for Norway at the 2022 World Junior Curling Championships throwing third rocks for Eirin Mesloe. There, the team finished the round robin in first place with a 7–2 record. They then lost the semifinal and bronze medal game to Sweden and the United States respectively, placing fourth at the event. At the 2023 World Junior Curling Championships, Bjørnstad took over as skip of the team, which also consisted of Nora Østgård, Ingeborg Forbregd and Eilin Kjærland. She led Norway to another 7–2 round robin record. In the playoffs, the team lost in the semifinal to Scotland's Fay Henderson rink, but rebounded in the bronze medal game to defeat Switzerland's Xenia Schwaller. At the 2024 World Junior Curling Championships, the team squeaked into the playoffs with a 5–4 round robin record. The team once again faltered in the semifinal, losing to Japan's Momoha Tabata team, before rebounding in the bronze medal game, defeating Canada's Myla Plett. Bjørnstad skipped the Norwegian team to a final World Juniors in 2025, now with Kjærland at second and new lead Andrine Vollan Rønning. The team finished the event with a 4–5 record, relegating Norway to have to play in the 2025 World Junior-B Curling Championships the following season.

Bjørnstad skipped Norway at the Curling at the 2025 Winter World University Games. The team, which also consisted of Østgård at third, Forbregd at second and Mesloe at lead went 6–3 in the round robin. In the playoffs, the team lost to South Korea's Kang Bo-bae in the semifinal and Canada's Serena Gray-Withers in the bronze medal game.

=== Women's ===
While a member of the Team Mesloe, Bjørnstad won bronze medals at the 2019 and 2023 Norwegian Women's Curling Championship and a gold in 2022. Since becoming a skip, Bjørnstad won the Norwegian championship in 2024 and 2025, and was the runner-up in 2026.

Bjørnstad and her women's team of Østgård, Forbregd and Mesloe were selected to be Norway's team at the 2026 World Women's Curling Championship, Bjørnstad's first World Championship appearance. There, the team finished with a 4–8 record, in 9th place overall.

== Personal life ==
As of 2026, Bjørnstad was a student.
