= Eilin Kjærland =

Norwegian curler (born 2004)

- Curler
- Born: 2004 (age 21–22)

Team
- Skip: Maia Ramsfjell
- Third: Robyn Munro
- Second: Mille Haslev Nordbye
- Lead: Eilin Kjærland
- Mixed doubles partner: Mathias Brænden

Curling career
- Member Association: Norway
- World Championship: 1 (2025)
- World Mixed Doubles Championship: 1 (2026)
- European Championship: 2 (2024, 2025)
Medal record
Women's curling
Representing Norway
World Junior Championships
Bronze medal – third place	2023 Füssen
Bronze medal – third place	2024 Lohja
Norwegian Women's Championship
Gold medal – first place	2024 Snarøya
Gold medal – first place	2026 Lillehammer
Silver medal – second place	2025 Halden

Eilin Kjærland (born 2004) is a Norwegian curler from Karmøy Municipality. She currently plays lead on Team Maia Ramsfjell.

== Career ==
=== Youth ===
Kjærland began curling at around the age of 16.

Kjærland was the lead on the Norwegian junior women's team at the 2023 and 2024 World Junior Curling Championships, skipped by Torild Bjørnstad. The team won bronze medals at both events.

Kjærland and teammate Eskil Åsmul Eriksen competed for Norway at the mixed doubles event at the 2025 Winter World University Games, where they finished with a 1–6 record.

=== Women's ===
As a member of the Bjørnstad rink, Kjærland won the 2024 Norwegian Women's Curling Championship.

Kjærland joined the Norwegian women's national team (skipped by Marianne Rørvik) in 2024 at lead position, replacing Martine Rønning. The team played in the 2024 European Curling Championships, finishing with a 4–5 record. This was good enough to qualify Norway for the 2025 World Women's Curling Championship, where they finished 5–7. Domestically, the team lost in the final of the 2025 Norwegian championship against Kjærland's former team, skipped by Torild Bjørnstad.

== Personal life ==
Kjærland's mother Heidi is the chair of the board of the Haugesund Curling Club.
