= Eirin Mesloe =

Norwegian curler (born 2000)

- Curler
- Born: 18 November 2000 (age 25); Oppdal Municipality, Norway

Team
- Curling club: Oppdal CK, Oppdal Municipality
- Skip: Torild Bjørnstad
- Third: Nora Østgård
- Second: Ingeborg Forbregd
- Lead: Eirin Mesloe

Curling career
- Member Association: Norway
- World Championship: 2 (2022, 2026)
- World Mixed Championship: 4 (2017, 2018, 2019, 2023)
- European Championship: 1 (2026)
- Other appearances: World University Games: 1 (2025)
Medal record
Representing Norway
Curling
World Mixed Championship
Bronze medal – third place	2019 Aberdeen

Eirin Mesloe (born 18 November 2000) is a Norwegian curler from Trondheim.

== Career ==
Mesloe joined the Norwegian junior women's curling team as the alternate for the 2017–18 season. In her first season with the team, skipped by Maia Ramsfjell, they finished third at the 2018 World Junior B Curling Championships. This qualified them for the 2018 World Junior Curling Championships, where they were able to reach the playoffs with a 5–4 record. The team then lost in the semifinal and bronze medal game, settling for fourth place. Because of their high placement, the team earned direct qualification into the 2019 World Junior Curling Championships. There, they finished in seventh place with a 3–6 record, enough to avoid relegation to the B Championship.

In 2020, Mesloe moved up to play second on the Norwegian junior team with Ramsfjell still skipping. At the 2020 World Junior Curling Championships, the team finished in eighth place, again with a 3–6 record. Because of this, the team was relegated to the 2021 B Championship where they would need to place in the top three in order to qualify for the World Juniors. However, the majority of the World Curling Federation events during the 2020–21 season were cancelled due to the COVID-19 pandemic, including the World Junior championships. The B Championship was then again cancelled during the 2021–22 season, however, the World Juniors were able to proceed. Because of the cancellation of the B Championship, the top three countries on the world rankings received spots at the 2022 World Junior Curling Championships, which Norway was one of. Skipping the Norwegian team, Mesloe led her rink to a 7–2 round robin record, finishing in first place after the round robin. They then lost the semifinal and bronze medal game to Sweden and the United States respectively, placing fourth at the event.

In 2022, Mesloe spared at second for the Norwegian women's curling team, skipped by Marianne Rørvik, at the 2022 World Qualification Event. She took the spot of fourth Kristin Skaslien, who was focusing on training for the 2022 Winter Olympics. At the event, the Norwegian team went a perfect 6–0 through the round robin to earn the top spot in the playoff round. They then lost to Denmark, before beating Latvia to earn a spot at the 2022 World Women's Curling Championship. For the World Championship, Skaslien returned to the team, shifting Mesloe to alternate. The team went 5–7 at the Worlds, finishing in eighth place. Also during the 2021–22 season, Mesloe skipped her junior team to victory at the Norwegian Women's Curling Championship, defeating the Rørvik rink in the final.

Aside from women's curling, Mesloe has represented Norway at three World Mixed Curling Championship's in 2017, 2018 and 2019 as lead for Ingvild Skaga. In 2017 and 2018, the team finished in fourth place after losing to Canada in the semifinal in both years. In 2019, they once again lost to Canada in the semifinal, but were able to defeat South Korea in the bronze medal game for third place.

Mesloe returned to world-level curling at the 2025 World University Games, where she was the lead for the Torild Bjørnstad rink representing the Norwegian University of Science and Technology, where they finished 4th, losing to Canada's Serena Gray-Withers 7–3 in the bronze medal game.

== Personal life ==
Mesloe was a student at the Norwegian University of Science and Technology. She currently works as a teacher.

== Teams ==
Season	Skip	Third	Second	Lead	Alternate
2016–17	Eirin Mesloe	Nina Aune	Sara Klefstad	Anne Foss	
2017–18	Maia Ramsfjell	Martine Rønning	Mille Haslev Nordbye	Eirin Mesloe	Victoria Johansen
2018–19	Maia Ramsfjell	Martine Rønning	Mille Haslev Nordbye	Astri Forbregd	Eirin Mesloe
2019–20	Maia Ramsfjell	Martine Rønning	Mille Haslev Nordbye	Astri Forbregd	Eirin Mesloe
2020–21	Eirin Mesloe	Nora Østgård	Torild Bjørnstad	Ingeborg Forbregd	Nina Aune
2021–22	Eirin Mesloe	Torild Bjørnstad	Nora Østgård	Ingeborg Forbregd	Nina Aune
2021–22	Kristin Skaslien (Fourth)	Marianne Rørvik (Skip)	Mille Haslev Nordbye	Martine Rønning	Eirin Mesloe
2022–23	Eirin Mesloe	Torild Bjørnstad	Nora Østgård	Ingeborg Forbregd	
2024–25	Torild Bjørnstad	Nora Østgård	Ingeborg Forbregd	Eirin Mesloe	
2025–26	Torild Bjørnstad	Nora Østgård	Ingeborg Forbregd	Eirin Mesloe	
2026–27	Torild Bjørnstad	Nora Østgård	Ingeborg Forbregd	Eirin Mesloe	
