= Julie Kjær Molnar =

Norwegian curler (born 1993)

- Curler
- Born: Julie Molnar

Team
- Curling club: Oppdal CK, Oppdal

Curling career
- Member Association: Norway
- World Championship: 1 (2015)
- European Championship: 4 (2013, 2014, 2015, 2016)
Medal record
Curling
Representing Norway
World Championship
Gold medal – first place	2015 Bern	Mixed team
European Championship
Silver medal – second place	2014 Copenhagen	Mixed team

Julie Kjær Molnar (born 14 July 1993) is a Norwegian curler.

As a junior curler, Kjær Molnar played in three World Junior Curling Championships. She played lead for Norway at both the 2011 and 2012 World Junior Curling Championships and was the alternate for Norway at the 2013 World Junior Curling Championships. At all three events, the teams were skipped by Kristine Davanger. In 2011 and 2012, the team finished 7th and in 2013, the team finished 10th, relegating Norway to the European Junior Curling Challenge for 2014.

After juniors, Kjær Molnar joined the Marianne Rørvik rink. They represented Norway at the 2013 European Curling Championships, placing 9th. They also played in the 2014 Winter Olympic Qualification event, placing third, just missing qualifying for the Olympics.

Kjær Molnar was a member of the 2014 European Mixed Curling Championship Norway team that won a silver medal. Kjær Molnar played lead on the team which was skipped by Steffen Walstad.

Kjær Molnar joined the Skaslien rink in 2014. They played in the 2014 European Curling Championships, finishing 11th, but managing to qualify Norway for the 2015 World Women's Curling Championship.

As a student at the Norwegian School of Sport Sciences, Kjær Molnar played third for the Norwegian team (skipped by Pia Trulsen) at the 2015 Winter Universiade. The team placed sixth.
