= Nora Østgård =

Norwegian curler (born 2004)

- Curler ♀
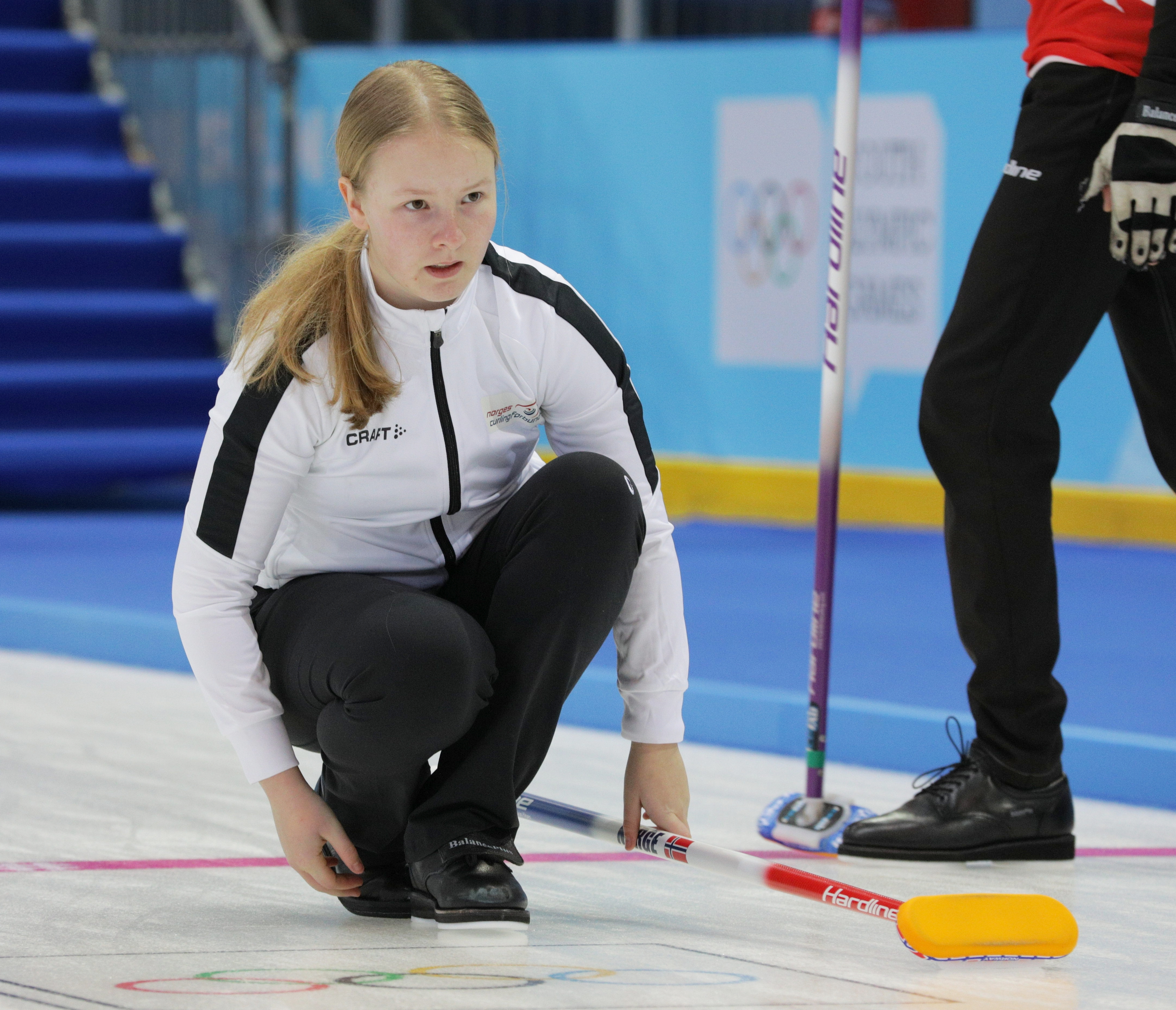
- Born: 29 May 2004 (age 22); Trondheim, Norway

Team
- Skip: Torild Bjørnstad
- Third: Nora Østgård
- Second: Ingeborg Forbregd
- Lead: Eirin Mesloe
- Alternate: Mille Haslev Nordbye

Curling career
- Member Association: Norway
- World Championship: 1 (2026)
- European Championship: 1 (2026)
- World Junior Curling Championship: 4 (2022, 2023, 2024, 2025)
- Other appearances: Winter World University Games: 1 (2025) (Winter Youth Olympcis: 1 (2020)
Medal record
Curling
Winter Youth Olympics
Gold medal – first place	2020 Lausanne
World Junior Championships
Bronze medal – third place	2023 Füssen
Bronze medal – third place	2024 Lohja
Norwegian Women's Championship
Gold medal – first place	2022 Haugesund
Gold medal – first place	2024 Oslo
Gold medal – first place	2025 Halden
Silver medal – second place	2026 Lillehammer
Bronze medal – third place	2023 Lillehammer
Norwegian Mixed Doubles Championship
Silver medal – second place	2025 Trondheim

Nora Østgård (born 29 May 2004) is a Norwegian curler from Trondheim. She is a former Winter Youth Olympic gold medallist and two-time World Junior bronze medallist.

== Career ==
=== Youth ===
Østgård was a member of the Norwegian team at the 2020 Winter Youth Olympics. Competing in the mixed team event, she threw third stones on a team skipped by Lukas Høstmælingen. After finishing 3–2 in group play, the team won all three of their playoff games to claim the gold medal. In the mixed doubles event, she was paired with Brazil's Michael Velve. They lost to Czech Kristyna Farková and Swede Axel Landelius in their only game.

Østgård represented Norway in four World Junior Curling Championships. She first played for Norway at the 2022 World Junior Curling Championships throwing second rocks for Eirin Mesloe. There, the team finished the round robin in first place with a 7–2 record. They then lost the semifinal and bronze medal game to Sweden and the United States respectively, placing fourth at the event. At the 2023 World Junior Curling Championships, Østgård threw third stones with Torild Bjørnstad taking over as skip of the team. The team finished with another 7–2 round robin record. In the playoffs, the team lost in the semifinal to Scotland's Fay Henderson rink but rebounded in the bronze medal game to defeat Switzerland's Xenia Schwaller. At the 2024 World Junior Curling Championships, the team squeaked into the playoffs with a 5–4 round robin record. The team once again faltered in the semifinal, losing to Japan's Momoha Tabata team, before rebounding in the bronze medal game, defeating Canada's Myla Plett. Østgård played in her final World Juniors in 2025. There, the team finished the event with a 4–5 record, relegating Norway to having to play in the 2025 World Junior-B Curling Championships the following season.

Østgård also played for Norway at the Curling at the 2025 Winter World University Games. The team finished the round robin with a 6–3 record. In the playoffs, the team lost to South Korea's Kang Bo-bae in the semifinal and Canada's Serena Gray-Withers in the bronze medal game.

Østgård and partner Eskil Eriksen competed at the 2025 World Junior Mixed Doubles Curling Championship. There, the pair finished the group stage with a 4–2 record, just missing the playoffs.

=== Women's ===
While playing second for Team Mesloe, Østgård won the Norwegian Women's Curling Championship in 2022, and placed third in 2023. Since joining Team Bjørnstad, Østgård won the Norwegian championship in 2024 and 2025, and was the runner-up in 2026.

Team Bjørnstad, with Østgård playing third, was selected to be Norway's team at the 2026 World Women's Curling Championship, Østgård's first World Championship appearance. There, the team finished with a 4–8 record, in 9th place overall.

=== Mixed doubles ===
In addition to competing in the 2025 World Junior Mixed Doubles Curling Championship, Østgård and Eriksen played in the 2025 Norwegian Mixed Doubles Curling Championship, where they placed second, losing to Kristin Skaslien and Magnus Nedregotten in the final.

== Personal life ==
As of 2026, Østgård was a nursing student.
