= Pia Trulsen =

Norwegian curler

- Curler
- Born: April 9, 1991 (age 35)

Team
- Skip: Maia Ramsfjell
- Fourth: Mili Smith
- Second: Pia Trulsen
- Lead: Leanne McKenzie

Curling career
- Member Association: Norway
- World Championship: 1 (2015)
- European Championship: 6 (2011, 2013, 2014, 2017, 2018, 2019)
Medal record
Curling
Representing Norway
World Championship
Gold medal – first place	2015 Bern	Mixed team

Pia Spiten Trulsen (born 9 April 1991) is a Norwegian curler. She is daughter of Pål Trulsen. She competed at the 2015 World Women's Curling Championship in Sapporo, Japan. She also took part in the 2011, 2013 and 2014 European Curling Championships.
