= Marianne Rørvik =

Norwegian curler (born 1983)

- Curler
- Born: 2 August 1983 (age 43)

Team
- Curling club: Snarøen CC, Oslo, Norway

Curling career
- Member Association: Norway
- World Championship: 8 (2004, 2005, 2009, 2011, 2022, 2023, 2024, 2025)
- European Championship: 15 (2002, 2004, 2005, 2006, 2007, 2008, 2009, 2013, 2018, 2019, 2021, 2022, 2023, 2024, 2025)
- Olympic: 1 (2006)
Medal record
Women's curling
Representing Norway
World Championships
| Silver medal – second place | 2004 Gävle |
| Silver medal – second place | 2023 Sandviken |
| Bronze medal – third place | 2005 Paisley |
European Championships
| Bronze medal – third place | 2002 Grindelwald |
| Bronze medal – third place | 2004 Sofia |
| Bronze medal – third place | 2023 Aberdeen |
World Junior Championships
| Gold medal – first place | 2004 Trois-Rivières |
Winter Universiade
| Bronze medal – third place | 2003 Tarvisio |

Marianne Rørvik (born 2 August 1983) is a Norwegian curler from Oslo.

Rørvik has played in nine straight (1997–2005) World Junior Curling Championships, winning gold in 2004 playing third for Linn Githmark. In 2002, she was added as an alternate player on the Dordi Nordby rink. In 2005, she played second for the team, which included a trip to the 2006 Winter Olympics and a fourth-place finish. In 2006, she was promoted as the team's third, and finally with the retirement of Nordby in 2008, she got to skip the national team.

== Personal life ==
Rørvik is in a relationship with fellow curler Torger Nergård and is mother of two children Karine (b. 2010) & Thale (b. 2013). She works as a senior advisor at Norwegian Water Sources and Energy.

== Grand Slam record ==
Key
| C | Champion |
| F | Lost in Final |
| SF | Lost in Semifinal |
| QF | Lost in Quarterfinals |
| R16 | Lost in the round of 16 |
| Q | Did not advance to playoffs |
| T2 | Played in Tier 2 event |
| DNP | Did not participate in event |
| N/A | Not a Grand Slam event that season |

| Event | 2022–23 | 2023–24 |
|---|---|---|
| Tour Challenge | DNP | Q |
| Champions Cup | Q | N/A |
