= List of oldest buildings and structures in Greater Sudbury =

This is a list of the oldest buildings and structures in Greater Sudbury, Ontario, Canada, that were constructed before 1920.

== Surviving structures ==
=== 1883-1899 ===
Building	Image	Year completed	Builder	Style	Address	Community	Ref.
Ste. Anne's Rectory		1883		Second Empire	40 Beech Street	Sudbury	
Copper Cliff Museum		1894			26 Balsam Street	Copper Cliff	
David Street Waterworks		1896		Industrial	355 David Street	Sudbury	
St. Joseph's Hospital		1898			20 Ste Anne Road	Sudbury	
Carrefour Senator Rhéal Belisle Cultural Centre		1899			2777 Main Street	Blezard Valley	

=== 1900-1909 ===
Building	Image	Year completed	Builder	Style	Address	Community	Ref.
McVittie Residence		1900	William McVittie		250 Edmund Street	Sudbury	
Flour Mill Museum		1902			155 Kehoe Ave	Sudbury	
Canadian Copper Company General Office Building		1902	Canadian Copper Company		33 Godfrey Drive	Copper Cliff	
Baikie-Muirhead Building		1903			73 Elm Street	Sudbury	
Bélanger House		1906	Azilda Bélanger	Carpenter Gothic	725 Notre Dame Street	Azilda	
Sudbury Brewing and Malting Co. Brewery		1907			185 Lorne Street	Sudbury	
Moses Block		1915	Hascal Moses	Flatiron	Durham at Elgin Street	Sudbury	
Canadian Pacific Railway Station		1907	Canadian Pacific Railway	Romanesque Revival	1 Van Horne Street	Sudbury	
Belrock Mansion		1907	William J. Bell	Arts and crafts	251 John Street	Sudbury	
Grand Theatre		1909			28 Elgin Street	Sudbury	

=== 1910-1919 ===
Building	Image	Year completed	Builder	Style	Address	Community	Ref.
Copper Cliff Fire Hall		1910	Town of Copper Cliff	Early 20th century fire hall	7 Serpentine Street	Copper Cliff	
Flour Mill Silos		1911	Manitoba and Ontario Flour Mill	Industrial	Notre Dame Avenue at St. Charles Street	Sudbury	
Silverman Building		1911	Aaron Silverman		67 Elm Street	Sudbury	
Church of the Epiphany		1913	Anglican Church of Canada	Gothic Revival	85 Larch Street	Sudbury	
Bell Canada Building		1913	Bell Telephone Company of Canada		83 Cedar Street	Sudbury	
Copper Cliff Hospital		1913			38 Godfrey Drive	Copper Cliff	
Prete Block		1914	Alex Prete		206 Elgin Street	Sudbury	
Anderson Farm		1914			550 Municipal Road 24	Lively	
Canadian Pacific Telegraph Building		1914	Canadian Pacific Railway	Edwardian	9 Elgin Street	Sudbury	
Bank of Toronto Copper Cliff Branch		1914	Bank of Toronto		2 Serpentine Street	Copper Cliff	
École Saint-Louis-de-Gonzague		1915		Collegiate Gothic, Art Deco	162 MacKenzie Street	Sudbury	
Rothschild Block		1915	Dan Rothschild		7 Cedar Street	Sudbury	
Superintendents House		1916	Canadian Northern Railway	Arts and crafts	26 Bloor Street	Capreol	
Copper Cliff Club		1916	Canadian Copper Company	Tudor Revival	25 Creighton Road	Copper Cliff	
Stafford Block		1916			93 Durham Street	Sudbury	
Sterling Bank		1918	Sterling Bank of Canada	Baroque Revival	80 Elm Street	Sudbury	
Capreol Public School		1919	Town of Capreol		9 Morin Street	Capreol	

== See also ==
- List of historic places in Greater Sudbury
