= List of historic places in Greater Sudbury =

This is a list of historic places in the City of Greater Sudbury, Ontario, whether they are federal, provincial, or municipal.

See also List of historic places in Ontario.

== Designated heritage sites ==
Building	Image	Year completed	Builder	Style	Address	Community	Ref.
Sudbury Station		1907	Canadian Pacific Railway	Romanesque Revival	1 Van Horne Street	Sudbury	
Copper Cliff Fire Hall		1910	Town of Copper Cliff	Early 20th century fire hall	7 Serpentine Street	Copper Cliff	
Bélanger House		1906	Azilda Bélanger		725 Notre Dame Street	Azilda	
Belrock Mansion		1906	William J. Bell	Arts and crafts	251 John Street	Sudbury	
Church of the Epiphany		1913	Anglican Church of Canada	Gothic Revival	85 Larch Street	Sudbury	
École Saint-Louis-de-Gonzague		1915		Collegiate Gothic, Art Deco	162 MacKenzie Street	Sudbury	
Flour Mill Museum		1902-1906			140 St. George Street	Sudbury	
Flour Mill Silos		1910		Industrial	Notre Dame Avenue at St. Charles Street	Sudbury	
Government of Canada Building		1957			19 Lisgar Street	Sudbury	
Ste. Anne's Rectory		1883			40 Beech Street	Sudbury	
Superintendents House		1916	Canadian Northern Railway		26 Bloor Street	Capreol	

== Listed heritage sites ==
Listed sites are properties that are identified as having cultural heritage value or interest to the community, but are not regulated by municipal, provincial, or federal regulation.

Building	Image	Year completed	Builder	Style	Address	Community	Ref.
Anderson Farm		1914-1930s			550 Municipal Road 24	Lively	
Carrefour Senator Rheal Belisle Cultural Centre		1899			2777 Main Street	Blezard Valley	
Capreol Fire Hall		1929		Early 20th century fire hall	59 Young Street	Capreol	
David Street Waterworks		1896		Industrial	355 David Street	Sudbury	
Fielding Memorial Chapel of St. Mark		1968			935 Ramsey Lake Road	Sudbury	
Queen's Athletic Field		1939		Sports field	30 Cypress Street	Sudbury	

== See also ==
- List of tallest buildings in Greater Sudbury
- List of oldest buildings and structures in Greater Sudbury
