= List of teams on the 2020–21 World Curling Tour =

Following is a list of teams on the 2020–21 World Curling Tour, which will be part of the 2020–21 curling season.

== Men ==
As of October 30, 2020

Skip	Third	Second	Lead	Alternate	Locale
Rob Ainsley (Fourth)	Dave Ellis (Skip)	Graeme Robson	Darren Karn		Toronto, Ontario
Ted Appelman	Nathan Connolly	Tom Appelman	Kevin Tym		Edmonton, Alberta
Christian Bangerter	Kim-Lloyd Sciboz	Daniel Inversini	Antoine Liaudet	Michael Devaux	Bern, Switzerland
Jannis Bannwart	Fabio Da Ros	Niels Heilmann	Curdin Berther		St. Gallen, Switzerland
Alek Bédard	Louis Quevillon	Émile Asselin	Bradley Lequin	Daniel Bédard	Montreal, Quebec
Brett Behm	Brendan Ross	Daniel Mutlow	Ian Howell		Moose Jaw, Saskatchewan
Sylvain Bellavance	Andre Bellavance	Dan Gilbert	Andre Gange		Boucherville / Val-d'Or, Quebec
Daymond Bernath	Bradley Moser	David Baum	Brayden Grindheim		Saskatoon, Saskatchewan
Daniel Birchard	Kelly Fordyce	Brody Moore	Andrew Peck		Winnipeg, Manitoba
Kjetil Bjoerke	Tor Fredriksen	Sonny Lodin	Håvard Nordmann	Håvard Jacobsen	Bygdøy, Norway
Ingebrigt Bjørnstad	Michael Mellemseter	Marcus Wolan	Andreas Hårstad		Oppdal, Norway
Trevor Bonot	Kent Haarup	Andrew Hackner	Troy Avis		Thunder Bay, Ontario
Tom Borgersen	Odd Persokrud	Tormod Andreassen	Kenneth Broerby		Jevnaker, Norway
Brendan Bottcher	Darren Moulding	Brad Thiessen	Karrick Martin		Edmonton, Alberta
Mathias Brænden	Eirik Øy	Johan Herfjord	Martin Bruseth		Oppdal, Norway
Samuel Branconnier	Patrik Labrosse	Tyler Smith	Alex Rheaume	Sabastien Whissell	Sudbury, Ontario
Jed Brundidge	Evan Workin	Lance Wheeler	Cameron Rittenour		(United States) St. Paul, Minnesota
Cameron Bryce	Craig Waddell	Gregor Cannon	Luke Carson		Stirling, Scotland
Bryan Burgess	Mike Vale	Tristan Vale	Greg Hollins		Thunder Bay, Ontario
Dallas Burgess	Matt Duizer	Jackson Dubinsky	Brayden Sinclair		Thunder Bay, Ontario
Braden Calvert	Kyle Kurz	Ian McMillan	Rob Gordon		Winnipeg, Manitoba
Mac Calwell	Matt Pretty	Kurt Armstrong	Morgan Calwell	Riley Calwell	Ottawa, Ontario
Jason Camm	Matthew Hall	Cameron Goodkey	Jordie Lyon-Hatcher		Ottawa, Ontario
Michael Carss	Tyler Travis	Aaron Shutra	Lyndon Holm		Regina, Saskatchewan
Daniel Casper	Marius Kleinas	Ethan Sampson	Coleman Thurston		(United States) Chaska, Minnesota
Corey Chambers	Julien Leduc	Devon Wiebe	Stuart Shiells		Winnipeg, Manitoba
Alex Champ	Charlie Richard	Terry Arnold	Scott Clinton		Waterloo, Ontario
Cameron MacKenzie (Fourth)	Travis Colter (Skip)	Ian Juurlink	Robby McLean		Halifax, Nova Scotia
Rene Comeau	Adam Freilich	Colton Daly	Ed Moore		Fredericton, New Brunswick
Nicholas Connolly	Kyle Kakela	Timothy Hodek	Nathan Perry	Benh Guzman	(United States) Pittsburgh, Pennsylvania
Warren Cross	Tyler Pfiffer	Morgan Van Doesburg	Mike Lambert		Edmonton, Alberta
Chad Dahlseide	Mike Coolidge	James Wenzel	Rob Lane		Calgary, Alberta
Neil Dangerfield	Dennis Sutton	Darren Boden	Connar Croteau		Victoria, British Columbia
Benoît Schwarz (Fourth)	Sven Michel	Peter de Cruz (Skip)	Valentin Tanner		Geneva, Switzerland
Mike Desliets	Scott Henderson	Dale Wiersema	Bill Peloza		Thunder Bay, Ontario
Robert Desjardins	Francois Gionest	Pierre-Luc Morissette	Marc-Alexandre Dion		Saguenay, Quebec
Paul Dexter	Bryce Everist	Chris MacRae	Taylor Ardiel		Halifax, Nova Scotia
Ty Dilello	Justin Ritcher	Braden Zawada	Brooks Freeman	Devin McArthur	Altona, Manitoba
Jacob Dobson	Elias Whittington	Owen Nicholls	Matthew Abrams		Haliburton, Ontario
German Doronin	Maksim Shibilkin	Dmitry Sirotkin	Daniil Fomin	Nikita Shekhirev	Moscow, Russia
Matthew Drewitz	Adam Drewitz	Caden Snow	Jared Tessier		Saskatoon, Saskatchewan
Korey Dropkin	Joe Polo	Mark Fenner	Thomas Howell	Alex Fenson	(United States) Chaska, Minnesota
Scott Dunnam	Hunter Clawson	Cody Clouser	Andrew Dunnam	Daniel Dudt	(United States) Philadelphia, Pennsylvania
Matt Dunstone	Braeden Moskowy	Kirk Muyres	Dustin Kidby		Regina, Saskatchewan
Niklas Edin	Oskar Eriksson	Rasmus Wranå	Christoffer Sundgren		Karlstad, Sweden
Matias Eggen	Haakon Horvli	Erik Nikolai Libakk	Eskil Eriksen	Hogne Myrvold	Oppdal, Norway
John Epping	Ryan Fry	Mat Camm	Brent Laing		Toronto, Ontario
Georgy Epremyan	Timophei Nasonov	Mikhail Golikov	Grigory Lavrov	Andrey Shestopalov	Moscow, Russia
Alexander Eremin	Mikhail Vaskov	Alexey Tuzov	Alexey Kulikov	Kirill Savenkov	Dmitrov, Russia
Riley Fenson	Samuel Strouse	Eli Clawson	Trevor Marquardt		(United States) Chaska, Minnesota
Alexandre Ferland	Jean-Philippe Reid	Carl Levesque	Stephane Palin		Chicoutimi, Quebec
Martin Ferland	Éric Sylvain	Jean Gagnon	Maurice Cayouette		Quebec, Quebec
Pat Ferris	Ian Dickie	Connor Duhaime	Zack Shurtleff		Grimsby, Ontario
Colton Flasch	Catlin Schneider	Kevin Marsh	Dan Marsh		Saskatoon, Saskatchewan
Mike Fournier	Martin Crête	Félix Asselin	Jean-François Trépanier		Montreal, Quebec
Benoit Gagné	Pierre Lajoie	Maxime Bilodeau	Mathieu Paquet	Vincent Fortin	Quebec, Quebec
Jacques Gauthier	Jordan Peters	Brayden Payette	Cole Chandler		Winnipeg, Manitoba
Mathias Genner	Jonas Backofen	Martin Reichel	Florian Mavec		Kitzbühel, Austria
Andrew Gibson	Mike Flemming	Kris Granchelli	Jake Flemming		Halifax, Nova Scotia
Sergey Glukhov	Dmitry Mironov	Artur Ali	Anton Kalalb	Yegor Volkov	Sochi, Russia
Dale Goehring	Jeff Phenix	Fred Edwards	Andrew Brotherhood		Calgary, Alberta
Colton Goller	Warren Kozak	James Keats	Dwayne Romanchuk	Rhett Friesz	Calgary, Alberta
Simon Granbom	Axel Sjöberg	Fabian Wingfors	Jacob Hanna		Gävle, Sweden
Sean Grassie	Tyler Drews	Daryl Evans	Rodney Legault		Winnipeg, Manitoba
James Grattan	Paul Dobson	Andy McCann	Jamie Brannen		Oromocto, New Brunswick
Vasily Groshev	Danil Dmitriev	Alexander Khamushin	Valery Kochergin		Krasnoyarsk, Russia
Jason Gunnlaugson	Adam Casey	Matt Wozniak	Connor Njegovan		Winnipeg, Manitoba
Brad Gushue	Mark Nichols	Brett Gallant	Geoff Walker		St. John's, Newfoundland and Labrador
Al Hackner	Joe Scharf	Jamie Childs	Gary Champagne		Thunder Bay, Ontario
Kalem Hamilton	Kevin Hawkshaw	Joseph Trieu	Stephen Hood		Airdrie, Alberta
Reece Hamm	Zach McKeigan	Tim Johnson	Graham Normand	Jayden Rutter	Winnipeg, Manitoba
Rune Steen Hansen	Tor Egil Stroemeng	Vidar Hansen	Trond Erik Standerholen		Hedmarken, Norway
Klaudius Harsch	Magnus Sutor	Jan-Lucia Haag	Till Wunderlich	Kevin Bold	Füssen, Germany
Rylan Hartley	John Gabel	Zander Elmes	Austin Snyder		Brantford, Ontario
Kody Hartung	Tyler Hartung	Jayden Shwaga	Mark Larsen		Langenburg, Saskatchewan
Jeremy Harty	Kyler Kleibrink	Joshua Kiist	Kurtis Goller		Calgary, Alberta
Christian Heinimann	Felix Eberhard	Linus Imfeld	Lorenz Krammer		Basel, Switzerland
Jan Hess	Simon Gloor	Simon Höhn	Reto Schönenberger		Zug, Switzerland
Tim Hocking (Fourth)	Darren Higgins (Skip)	Mike Spencer	Jonathan Greenan		Summerside, Prince Edward Island
Andrew Hodgson	Jared Palanuik	Blake Johnson	Tyler Gritten		Lacombe, Alberta
Marco Hösli	Philipp Hösli	Marco Hefti	Justin Hausherr		Glarus, Switzerland
Tanner Horgan	Colton Lott	Kyle Doering	Tanner Lott		Winnipeg Beach, Manitoba
Grunde Morten Buraas (Fourth)	Lukas Høstmælingen (Skip)	Magnus Lillebo	Tinius Haslev Nordbye	Sander Moen	Lillehammer, Norway
Glenn Howard	Scott Howard	David Mathers	Tim March		Penetanguishene, Ontario
Steven Howard	Daniel Selke	Mat Ring	Scott Deck		Regina, Saskatchewan
Jeremy Hozjan	Brady Gould	Brett Kubricht	Ryan Smith		(United States) Charlotte, North Carolina
Dean Hürlimann	Matthieu Fague	Nicolas Romang	Jan Tanner		Zug, Switzerland
Justin Hurl	Matt Mann	Daniel Moerike	Justin Dinney		Prince Albert, Saskatchewan
Andrey Ilyin	Alexandr Burdakov	Maxim Buylov	Alexandr Gapanchuk	Alexander Chekanov	Moscow, Russia
Stephen Imes	Josh Lopez	Denis Metty	Kevin Dolan		(United States) Columbus, Ohio
Greg Inglis	Jacob Jones	John McCutcheon	Will Vander Meulen		Belleville, Ontario
Jan Iseli	Max Winz	Nathan Weber	Ilian Meier	Sandro Fanchini	Solothurn, Switzerland
Brad Jacobs	Marc Kennedy	E. J. Harnden	Ryan Harnden		Sault Ste. Marie, Ontario
Jason Jacobson	Dustin Kalthoff	Jacob Hersikorn	Quinn Hersikorn		Saskatoon, Saskatchewan
Ryan Jacques	Desmond Young	Andrew Gittis	Gabriel Dyck		Edmonton, Alberta
Dylan Johnston	Oye-Sem Won Briand	Chris Briand	Kurtis Byrd		Thunder Bay, Ontario
Jeremy Mallais (Fourth)	Chris Jeffrey	Brian King	Scott Jones (Skip)		Moncton, New Brunswick
Marc Pfister (Fourth)	Tim Jungen	Björn Jungen (Skip)	Simon Gempeler	Enrico Pfister	Adelboden, Switzerland
Connor Kauffman	Aiden Oldenburg	Nick Soto	Jake Thurston		(United States) Minneapolis, Minnesota
Mark Kean	Kevin Flewwelling	Ed Cyr	Sean Harrison		Woodstock, Ontario
Brady Kendel	Anthony Neufeld	Nicklas Neufeld	Brandon Leippi		Saskatoon, Saskatchewan
Glen Kennedy	Roland Robinson	Aaron Sarafinchan	Brad Kokoroyannis		Edmonton, Alberta
Kim Chang-min	Lee Ki-jeong	Kim Hak-kyun	Lee Ki-bok		Uiseong, South Korea
Jamie King	Mike Jantzen	Sean Morris	Todd Brick		Calgary / Edmonton, Alberta
Alexander Kirikov	Andrey Drozdov	Vadim Shkolnikov	Sergei Morozov	Dmitry Abanin	Moscow, Russia
Rylan Kleiter	Joshua Mattern	Trevor Johnson	Matthieu Taillon		Saskatoon, Saskatchewan
Anthony Petoud (Fourth)	Jan Klossner (Skip)	Pablo Lachat	Theo Kurz		Langenthal, Switzerland
Kelly Knapp	Brock Montgomery	Mike Armstrong	Trent Knapp		Regina, Saskatchewan
Kevin Koe	B. J. Neufeld	John Morris	Ben Hebert		Calgary, Alberta
Chihiro Kon	Masaki Fujimura	Tetsuo Yamaguchi	Haruto Saito		Aomori, Japan
Naoki Kon	Toshihiro Izumi	Takashi Higuchi	Hayato Fujimura		Miyagi, Japan
Oleg Krasikov	Petr Dron	Sergei Varlamov	Danil Kiba	Matvei Vakin	Saint Petersburg, Russia
Anders Kraupp	Michael Vilenius	Rolf Wikström	Peter Tedenback		Stocksund, Sweden
Mikkel Krause	Mads Nørgård	Henrik Holtermann	Tobias Rasmussen		Hvidovre, Denmark
Jacob Lamb	Daniel Vanveghel	Eric Just	Troy Stoner	Justin Chung	Dundas, Ontario
Shane Latimer	Tyler Stewart	Punit Sthankiya	Brendan Acorn		Ayr, Ontario
Jim Cotter (Fourth)	Steve Laycock (Skip)	Andrew Nerpin	Rick Sawatsky		Vernon, British Columbia
Yannick Lessard	Pierrot Deschensnes	Mason Cormier	Christian Boudreault		Saguenay, Quebec
Jacob Libbus	Riley Helston	Michael Dumont	Michael Henricks		Okotoks, Alberta
Alexander Lindström	Sander Rølvåg	Kristofer Blom	Axel Rosander		Stockholm, Sweden
Tanner Lott	Kody Janzen	Andrew Irving	Brad Van Walleghem		Selkirk, Manitoba
Gleb Lyasnikov	Artem Bukarev	Dmitry Logvin	Alexander Terentjev	Alexey Stukalskiy	Saint Petersburg, Russia
Brent MacDougall	Tommy Sullivan	Martin Gavin	Kirk MacDiarmid		Halifax, Nova Scotia
Sandy MacEwan	Dustin Montpellier	Lee Toner	Luc Ouimet		Sudbury, Ontario
Daniel Magnusson	Rasmus Israelsson	Robin Ahlberg	Anton Regosa		Karlstad, Sweden
Rob Maksymetz	Dean Darwent	Stephen Bryne	Phil Hemming		Edmonton, Alberta
Andrew Manson	Nicholas Warkman	Cole Lewis	Miki Becker		Calgary, Alberta
Matthew Manuel	Luke Saunders	Jeffrey Meagher	Ryan Abraham		Halifax, Nova Scotia
Stéphane Mariétan	Didier Perrin	Charles Ramey	David Clerc		Champéry, Switzerland
Yannick Martel	Jean-François Charest	Rene Dubois	Denis Laflamme	Stephane Palin	Sept-Îles, Quebec
Bert Martin	Chris McDonah	Brad MacImmes	Andre Fagnon		Airdrie, Alberta
Yuta Matsumura	Tetsuro Shimizu	Yasumasa Tanida	Shinya Abe		Kitami, Japan
Mike McCarville	Jordan Potter	Zach Warkentin	Travis Potter		Thunder Bay, Ontario
Jordon McDonald	Zachary Wasylkiw	Thomas Dunlop	Alexandre Fontaine		Winnipeg, Manitoba
Scott McDonald	Jonathan Beuk	Wesley Forget	Scott Chadwick		Kingston, Ontario
Mike McEwen	Reid Carruthers	Derek Samagalski	Colin Hodgson		Winnipeg, Manitoba
Shaun Meachem	Brady Scharback	Brayden Stewart	Jared Latos		Saskatoon, Saskatchewan
Ben Mikkelsen	Greg Doran	Carter Morash	Devin Doran		Thunder Bay, Ontario
Dustin Mikush	Jayden Bindig	Logan Ede	Reese Kinaschuk		Wadena, Saskatchewan
Paul Moffatt	Ben Shane	John Gabel	Kyle Forster		Kitchener-Waterloo, Ontario
Sam Mooibroek	Christopher Inglis	Sam Hastings	Charlie Randell		Cambridge, Ontario
Frank Morissette	Pat Berezowski	Kristofer Leupen	Rob Skinner		Thunder Bay, Ontario
Yusuke Morozumi	Masaki Iwai	Ryotaro Shukuya	Kosuke Morozumi		Karuizawa, Japan
Bruce Mouat	Grant Hardie	Bobby Lammie	Hammy McMillan Jr.		Stirling, Scotland
Jamie Murphy	Paul Flemming	Scott Saccary	Phil Crowell		Halifax, Nova Scotia
Willhelm Næss	Olav Kringlebotn	Jørgen Myran	–		Oppdal, Norway
Kotaro Noguchi	Yuto Kamada	Hiroshi Kato	Yuuki Yoshimura		Sendai-shi, Japan
Jørn Nordhagen	Niclas Engevold Nordhagen	Jan Sveen	Tom Ian Halsor		Lillehammer, Norway
Håkan Nyberg	Richard Eriksson	Hans Stenström	Ulf Johansson		Linköping, Sweden
Fredrik Nyman	Albin Eriksson	Simon Olofsson	Johannes Patz		Leksand, Sweden
Sean O'Connor	Kyle Morrison	Rob Johnson	Dan Bubola		Calgary, Alberta
Ryo Ogihara	Satoru Tsukamoto	Nobuhito Kasahara	Tatsuki Sasaki		Tokyo, Japan
Aleksandr Orlov	Sergei Morozov	Vadim Shvedov	Nikita Ignatkov	Konstanin Manasevich	Saint Petersburg, Russia
Ross Paterson	Kyle Waddell	Duncan Menzies	Michael Goodfellow		Glasgow, Scotland
Raphaël Patry	Anthony Pedneault	Zachary Pedneault	Jacob Labrecque		Saguenay, Quebec
Mark Patterson	Rick Law	Ed DeSchutter	Andrew Willemsma		Blenheim, Ontario
Greg Persinger	Dominik Märki	Alex Leitcher	Shawn Banyai	Craig Brown	(United States) Fairbanks, Alaska
Tony Pölder	Claes Mattsson	Johan Hornberg	Daniel Svensson		Jönköping, Sweden
Mike Pozihun	Denis Malette	Rob Shubat	Andy Peloza		Thunder Bay, Ontario
Gert Precenth	Olle Nåbo	Peter Nero	Per Persson		Mjölby, Sweden
Tom Pruliere	Peter Newton	Chris Weisher	Tim Church	Tanner Nathan	Paisley, Ontario
Owen Purdy	Josh Leung	Nathan Steele	Colin Schnurr		Kingston, Ontario
Vadim Raev	Daniil Voznyak	Artem Puzanov	Sergei Andrianov	Nikolai Levashov	Moscow, Russia
Jacob Rahn	Ryan Parent	Jared Jenkins	John Ritchie		Edmonton, Alberta
Magnus Ramsfjell	Martin Sesaker	Bendik Ramsfjell	Gaute Nepstad		Trondheim, Norway
Fraser Reid	Shane Konings	Spencer Nuttall	Tyler Twinning		Waterloo, Ontario
Joël Retornaz	Amos Mosaner	Sebastiano Arman	Simone Gonin		Pinerolo, Italy
Alberto Pimpini (Fourth)	Mattia Giovanella	Luca Rizzolli (Skip)	Daniele Ferrazza		Trentino, Italy
François Roberge	Serge Reid	Maxime Elmaleh	Daniel Bédard		Saguenay, Quebec
Vincent Roberge	Jean-Michel Arsenault	Jesse Mullen	Julien Tremblay		Lévis, Quebec
Sébastien Robillard	Cody Tanaka	Nathan Small	Alex Horvath		Maple Ridge, British Columbia
Landan Rooney	Steven Rotskas	Samuel Guilbeault	Ben Lobo		Mississauga, Ontario
Jean-Sébastien Roy	Don Bowser	Dan deWaard	Jasmin Gibeau		Chelsea, Quebec
Rich Ruohonen	Andrew Stopera	Colin Hufman	Phil Tilker	Kroy Nernberger	(United States) Minneapolis, Minnesota
Mikhail Samorukov	Vyacheslav Mastrukov	Victor Altukhov	Nikita Moskvin	Anton Mishin	Chelyabinsk, Russia
Johnny Sandaker	Karsten Sandaker	Jan Aabel	Paul Richardsen		Kristiansand, Norway
Andrin Schnider	Oliver Widmer	Nicola Stoll	Fabian Schmid	Tom Winkelhausen	St. Gallen, Switzerland
Yannick Schwaller	Michael Brunner	Romano Meier	Marcel Käufeler		Bern, Switzerland
Artyom Shmakov	Ivan Kazachkov	Alexander Polushvayko	Daniil Zazulskikh		Novosibirsk, Russia
John Shuster	Chris Plys	Matt Hamilton	John Landsteiner	Jared Zezel	(United States) Duluth, Minnesota
Mike Siggins	Adam Endicott	Travis Gaddie	Eric Kowal		(United States) Tempe, Arizona
Steen Sigurdson	Justin Reynolds	Nick Weshnoweski	Justin Hoplock		Winnipeg, Manitoba
Sebastien Simard	Eric Fortin	Sylvain Dubois	Michel Bergeron		Saguenay, Quebec
Trent Skanes	Cory Schuh	Adam Boland	Spencer Wicks		St. John's, Newfoundland and Labrador
Aaron Sluchinski	Kerr Drummond	Dylan Webster	Cole Adams		Airdrie, Alberta
Greg Smith	Greg Blyde	Braden Zawada	Evan McDonah		St. John's, Newfoundland and Labrador
Joseph Smith	Bryan Bruneau	Trevor Brewer	Stephen Bruneau		Plainfield, Ontario
Darryl Sobering	Sean Stevinson	Sean Franey	Josh Chetwynd		(United States) Denver, Colorado
Tobias Linneberg (Fourth)	Nicolai Sommervold (Skip)	Jakob Moen Bekken	Jonas Volla		Hedmarken, Norway
Jesse St. John	Carl deConinck Smith	Mark Larsen	Kevin Hobbs		Regina, Saskatchewan
Sam Steep	Adam Vincent	Oliver Campbell	Thomas Ryan	Doug Thomson	Seaforth, Ontario
Tracy Steinke	Jordan Steinke	George Parsons	Wayne Radke		Dawson Creek, British Columbia
Chad Stevens	Peter Burgess	Graham Breckon	Kelly Mittelstadt		Chester, Nova Scotia
Karsten Sturmay	Tristan Steinke	Chris Kennedy	Glenn Venance		Edmonton, Alberta
Konrad Stych	Krzyszstof Domin	Marcin Cieminski	Bartosz Łobaza		Łódź, Poland
Kirill Surovov	Alexey Philippov	Petr Kuznetsov	Daniil Shmelev	Yuri Shustrov	Dmitrov, Russia
Andrew Symonds	Chris Ford	Daniel Bruce	Keith Jewer		St. John's, Newfoundland and Labrador
Shun Tanaka	Shusaku Takata	Hidetake Ohtani	Kouki Tonuma	Ryo Kawanishi	Tokyo, Japan
Johnson Tao	Jaedon Neuert	Benjamin Morin	Andrew Nowell		Edmonton, Alberta
Tyler Tardi	Sterling Middleton	Jason Ginter	Jordan Tardi		Langley, British Columbia
Bryden Tessier	James Owens	Ryan Douglas	Josh Yuzik		Saskatoon, Saskatchewan
Charley Thomas	Brock Virtue	J. D. Lind	Matt Ng		Calgary, Alberta
Colin Thomas	Stephen Trickett	Zach Young	Mike Mosher	Jeff Thomas	St. John's, Newfoundland and Labrador
Stuart Thompson	Kendal Thompson	Colton Steele	Michael Brophy		Halifax, Nova Scotia
Alexey Timofeev	Daniil Goriachev	Evgeny Klimov	Artur Razhabov	Aleksandr Bystrov	Saint Petersburg, Russia
Brandon Tippin	Dylan Tippin	Chad Allen	Jess Bechard		Brantford, Ontario
Sixten Totzek	Marc Muskatewitz	Joshua Sutor	Dominik Greindl		Füssen, Germany
Kevin Tuma	Sidney Harris	Samuel Clasen	Jonathan Jamieson	Ryan Jamieson	(United States) Saint Paul, Minnesota
Evan Ugland	Roffe Sagen	Frank Humlekjær	Jon Sverre Karterud		Kristiansand, Norway
Thomas Ulsrud	Torger Nergård	Markus Høiberg	Magnus Vågberg		Oslo, Norway
Göran Valfridsson	Petter Svartling	Daniel Nåbo	Tobias Carlstedt		Sweden
Evan van Amsterdam	Parker Konschuh	Craig Bourgonje	Tyler van Amsterdam		Edmonton, Alberta
Wouter Gösgens (Fourth)	Jaap van Dorp (Skip)	Laurens Hoekman	Carlo Glasbergen		Zoetermeer, Netherlands
Jonathon Vellinga	Myles Harding	Jason Bennett	Owen Riches		Thunder Bay, Ontario
Elias Høstmælingen (Fourth)	Ådne Birketveit	Johan Høstmælingen	Eskil Vintervold (Skip)	Olav Flaekoy	Lillehammer, Norway
Luc Violette	Chase Sinnett	Ben Richardson	Jon Harstad		(United States) Chaska, Minnesota
Andrey Dudov (Fourth)	Mikhail Vlasenko (Skip)	Nikolai Lysakov	Kamil Karimov		Irkutsk, Russia
Steffen Walstad	Steffen Mellemseter	Magnus Nedregotten	Eirik Mjøen		Oslo, Norway
Owen Purcell (Fourth)	Scott Mitchell	Graeme Weagle (Skip)	Scott Weagle		Chester, Nova Scotia
Gary Weiss	Deron Surkan	Aaron Rogalski	Mark Blanchard		Thunder Bay, Ontario
Rolf Iseli (Fourth)	Jonas Weiss (Skip)	Yves Gigandet	Marcel Wettstein	Daniel Gubler	Aarau, Switzerland
Wesley Wendling	John Wilkerson	James Wendling	Jackson Armstrong		(United States) Wausau, Wisconsin
Anders Westerberg	Peter Larsson	Lads Ahlberg	Mikael Guslin		Stockholm, Sweden
Ross Whyte	Robin Brydone	Duncan McFadzean	Euan Kyle		Stirling, Scotland
Tomas Husnes-Moe (Fourth)	Christer Wibe (Skip)	Håkon Tandberg	Jens Olav Johansen		Halden, Norway
Ryan Wiebe	Sean Flatt	Zack Bilawka	Adam Flatt		Winnipeg, Manitoba
John Willsey	Ryan McCrady	Robert Currie	Evan Lilly	Connor Lawes	Collingwood, Ontario
Zackary Wise	Michael Solomon	Robert Derry	Tyler Lachance	David Bergeron	Montreal, Quebec
Harold Woods	Tijani Cole	Chris Neimeth	Contreras-Cole	Robert Brianne	Lagos, Nigeria
Mats Wranå	Mikael Hasselborg	Anders Eriksson	Gerry Wåhlin		Sundbyberg, Sweden
Tsuyoshi Yamaguchi	Riku Yanagisawa	Satoshi Koizumi	Fukuhiro Ohno	Taisei Kanai	Karuizawa, Japan
Zou Qiang	Tian Jiafeng	Wang Zhiyu	Tao Jingtao		Beijing, China

== Women ==
As of October 30, 2020

Skip	Third	Second	Lead	Alternate	Locale
Skylar Ackerman	Emily Haupstein	Taylor Stremick	Abbey Johnson		Saskatoon, Saskatchewan
Abby Ackland	Robyn Njegovan	Emilie Rafnson	Sara Oliver	Brandi Forrest	Winnipeg, Manitoba
Melissa Adams	Justine Comeau	Jaclyn Tingley	Kendra Lister		Fredericton, New Brunswick
Rebecca Morrison (Fourth)	Gina Aitken (Skip)	Mili Smith	Sophie Sinclair		Edinburgh, Scotland
Hanna Anderson	Stephanie Thomas	Madison Johnson	Jessica Thompson		Regina, Saskatchewan
Sherry Anderson	Nancy Martin	Chaelynn Kitz	Breanne Knapp		Saskatoon, Saskatchewan
Mary-Anne Arsenault	Jeanna Schraeder	Sasha Carter	Renee Simons		Kelowna, British Columbia
Yuki Asanuma	Atsuho Takahashi	Yuki Murakami	Yuuki Fukatsu		Morioka, Japan
Cathy Auld	Chrissy Cadorin	Courtney Auld	Cayla Auld		Thornhill, Ontario
Anastasia Babarykina	Anastasia Belikova	Victoria Shtreker	Regina Bogdanova	Alexandra Antonova	Saint Petersburg, Russia
Sarah Bailey	Grace Cave	Jillian Uniacke	Paige Ballantyne		St. Catharines, Ontario
Brett Barber	Alyssa Kostyk	Krystal Englot	Mackenzie Schwartz		Biggar, Saskatchewan
Penny Barker	Christie Gamble	Jenna Enge	Danielle Sicinski		Moose Jaw, Saskatchewan
Madison Bear	Annmarie Dubberstein	Taylor Drees	Allison Howell		(United States) Chaska, Minnesota
Lindsay Bertsch	Nicole Larson	Holly Jamieson	Hope Sunley		Calgary, Alberta
Alina Biktimirova	Ekaterina Antonova	Irina Belyayeva	Maria Arhipova	Marina Maleeva	Moscow, Russia
Suzanne Birt	Marie Christianson	Meaghan Hughes	Michelle McQuaid		Charlottetown, Prince Edward Island
Christina Black	Jenn Baxter	Karlee Jones	Shelley Barker		Halifax, Nova Scotia
Cathy Borys	Connie Lunde	Lynn Penner	Pauline Erickson	Charlene Jack	Sherwood Park, Alberta
Shelly Bradley	Amanda Power	Kristie Rogers	Aleya Quilty		Charlottetown, Prince Edward Island
Theresa Breen	Kelly Backman	Stephanie Guzzwell	Mary Sue Radford	Kristen MacDiarmid	Halifax, Nova Scotia
Jill Brothers	Erin Carmody	Sarah Murphy	Jenn Brine	Emma Logan	Halifax, Nova Scotia
Corryn Brown	Erin Pincott	Dezaray Hawes	Samantha Fisher		Kamloops, British Columbia
Cory Christensen	Sarah Anderson	Vicky Persinger	Taylor Anderson		(United States) Chaska, Minnesota
Thea Coburn	Breanna Rozon	Calissa Daly	Alice Holyoke		Toronto, Ontario
Shiella Cowan	Sandra Comadina	Stephanie Whittaker-Kask	Kim Slattery		Vancouver, British Columbia
Andrea Crawford	Sylvie Quillian	Jillian Babin	Katie Forward		Oromocto, New Brunswick
Bella Croisier	Rachel Steele	Emilie Lovitt	Piper Croisier		Sudbury, Ontario
Elysa Crough	Quinn Prodaniuk	Kim Bonneau	Julianna Mackenzie		Calgary / Edmonton, Alberta
Joanne Curtis	Shannon Jay	Kaitlyn Poirier	Jillian Page		St. Thomas, Ontario
Lisa Davie	Robyn Munro	Robyn Mitchell	Laura Watt		Stirling, Scotland
Abby Deschene	Lauren Rajala	Jessica Leonard	Mya Smith		Sudbury, Ontario
Emily Deschenes	Emma Artichuk	Lindsay Dubue	Michaela Robert	Grace Lloyd	Ottawa, Ontario
Hollie Duncan	Megan Balsdon	Rachelle Strybosch	Tess Bobbie		Woodstock, Ontario
Kerri Einarson	Val Sweeting	Shannon Birchard	Briane Meilleur		Gimli, Manitoba
Michelle Englot	Sara England	Shelby Brandt	Nicole Bender		Regina, Saskatchewan
Maria Ermeichuk	Anastasia Khalanskaya	Nkeirouka Ezekh	Margarita Evdokimova	Maria Drozdova	Saint Petersburg, Russia
Beth Farmer	Kirstin Bousie	Katie McMillan	Nicola Joiner		Kinross, Scotland
Tracy Fleury	Selena Njegovan	Liz Fyfe	Kristin MacCuish		East St. Paul, Manitoba
Susan Froud	Kristina Brauch	Kaelyn Gregory	Karen Rowsell	Katie McLaughlin	Alliston, Ontario
Satsuki Fujisawa	Chinami Yoshida	Yumi Suzuki	Yurika Yoshida		Kitami, Japan
Kerry Galusha	Sarah Koltun	Jo-Ann Rizzo	Margot Flemming		Yellowknife, Northwest Territories
Hetty Garnier	Anna Fowler	Lorna Rettig	Naomi Robinson	Lucinda Sparks	London, England
Noémie Gauthier	Hannah Gargul	Florence Boivin	Mélina Perron		Saguenay, Quebec
Gim Un-chi	Seol Ye-ji	Kim Su-ji	Seol Ye-eun	Park You-been	Gyeonggido, South Korea
Serena Gray-Withers	Zoe Cinnamon	Brianna Cullen	Emma Wiens		Edmonton, Alberta
Han Yu	Dong Ziqi	Zhang Lijun	Jiang Xindi		Beijing, China
Jacqueline Harrison	Allison Flaxey	Lynn Kreviazuk	Laura Hickey		Dundas, Ontario
Anna Hasselborg	Sara McManus	Agnes Knochenhauer	Sofia Mabergs		Sundbyberg, Sweden
Tanya Hilliard	Taylor Clarke	Mackenzie Feindel	Heather MacPhee		Dartmouth, Nova Scotia
Amber Holland	Kim Schneider	Karlee Korchinski	Debbie Lozinski		Regina, Saskatchewan
Rachel Homan	Emma Miskew	Sarah Wilkes	Joanne Courtney		Ottawa, Ontario
Lauren Horton	Dominique Jean	Brittany O'Rourke	Pamela Nugent		Dollard-des-Ormeaux, Quebec
Ashley Howard	Kourtney Fesser	Krista Fesser	Kaylin Skinner		Saskatoon, Saskatchewan
Corrie Hürlimann	Melina Bezzola	Jessica Jäggi	Anna Gut		Zug, Switzerland
Danielle Inglis	Jessica Corrado	Stephanie Corrado	Cassandra de Groot		Mississauga, Ontario
Daniela Jentsch	Emira Abbes	Alina Androsova-Kaulfersch	Analena Jentsch	Pia-Lisa Schöll	Füssen, Germany
Colleen Jones	Kim Kelly	Sheena Moore	Julia Colter	Liz Woodworth	Halifax, Nova Scotia
Jennifer Jones	Kaitlyn Lawes	Jocelyn Peterman	Dawn McEwen	Lisa Weagle	Winnipeg, Manitoba
Kaitlyn Jones	Jessica Daigle	Brigitte MacPhail	Lindsey Burgess	Kaitlin Fralic	Halifax, Nova Scotia
Sherry Just	Deborah Hawkshaw	Sarah Hoag	Alison Ingram		Saskatoon, Saskatchewan
Asuka Kanai	Ami Enami	Junko Nishimuro	Mone Ryokawa		Karuizawa, Japan
Selina Witschonke (Fourth)	Elena Mathis	Raphaela Keiser (Skip)	Marina Lörtscher		St. Moritz, Switzerland
Adele Kezama	Marianna Greenhough	Meghan Chateauvert	Heather Steele		Edmonton, Alberta
Mackenzie Kiemele	Katie Ford	Emma McKenzie	Jessica Filipcic		Kitchener-Waterloo, Ontario
Kim Eun-jung	Kim Kyeong-ae	Kim Seon-yeong	Kim Yeong-mi	Kim Cho-hi	Uiseong, South Korea
Kim Min-ji	Ha Seung-youn	Kim Hye-rin	Kim Su-jin	Yang Tae-i	Chuncheon, South Korea
Shannon Kleibrink	Allison Earl	Sandy Bell	Vicki Sjolie		Calgary, Alberta
Madison Kleiter	Kya Kennedy	Kelcee Kennedy	Mary Engel		Saskatoon, Saskatchewan
Tori Koana	Yuna Kotani	Mao Ishigaki	Arisa Kotani		Yamanashi, Japan
Ekaterina Korolyova	Margarita Bavrina	Polina Aleksandrova	Victoria Kulikova	Taisia Levchenko	Moscow, Russia
Anastasia Moskaleva (Fourth)	Olga Kotelnikova (Skip)	Daria Morozova	Daria Styoksova	Daria Panchenko	Dmitrov, Russia
Alina Kovaleva	Maria Komarova	Galina Arsenkina	Ekaterina Kuzmina	Vera Tyulyakova	Saint Petersburg, Russia
Isabelle Ladouceur	Jamie Smith	Brooklyn Fahl	Kelly Middaugh		Kitchener, Ontario
Colleen Madonia	Kerry Lackie	Kristin Turcotte	Peggy Barrette		Thornhill, Ontario
Britney Malette	Maddy Hollins	Karli Hicklin	Jaime Sinclair		Thunder Bay, Ontario
Lauren Mann	Kira Brunton	Cheryl Kreviazuk	Karen Sagle		Ottawa, Ontario
Abby Marks	Catherine Clifford	Paige Papley	Jamie Scott		Edmonton, Alberta
Krista McCarville	Kendra Lilly	Ashley Sippala	Sarah Potts		Thunder Bay, Ontario
Christine McMakin	Kathleen Dubberstein	Jackie Lemke	Nicole Prohaska		(United States) Fargo, North Dakota
Eirin Mesloe	Nora Østgård	Torild Bjørnstad	Ingeborg Forbregd		Oppdal, Norway
Sherry Middaugh	Karri-Lee Grant	Christine Loube	Jane Hooper-Perroud		Victoria Harbour, Ontario
Jessica Mitchell	Jenna Hope	Meaghan Frerichs	Teresa Waterfield		Regina, Saskatchewan
Sarah Müller	Malin Da Ros	Marion Wüest	Eveline Matti	Selina Gafner	Biel, Switzerland
Eve Muirhead	Lauren Gray	Jennifer Dodds	Vicky Wright		Stirling, Scotland
Jestyn Murphy	Carly Howard	Stephanie Matheson	Grace Holyoke		Mississauga, Ontario
Ikue Kitazawa (Fourth)	Chiaki Matsumura	Seina Nakajima (Skip)	Hasumi Ishigooka	Minori Suzuki	Nagano, Japan
Irina Nizovtseva	Arina Pyantina	Nadegda Belyakova	Alisa Shenefeldt	Anastasia Eksuzyan	Saint Petersburg, Russia
Kaylee Nodding	Katelyn Nodding	Lydia Locke	Alison Umlah		Lower Sackville, Nova Scotia
Anya Normandeau	Abigail Page	Rachel Kawleski	Anna Tomboli	Damaris Berg	(United States) Burnsville, Minnesota
Xeniya Novikova	Lolita Tretyak	Natalia Gubanova	Polina Tchernikh	Daria Tskhvedanashvili	Saint Petersburg, Russia
Sofia Orazalina	Maria Tsebriy	Karina Kurak	Arina Rusina	Ekaterina Prytkova	Moscow, Russia
Sherilee Orsted	Candace Newkirk	Shalon Fleming	Jasmine Kerr		Regina, Saskatchewan
Anastasia Paramonova	Victoria Postnova	Alina Irzhanova	Ekaterina Ivanova	Alexandra Leonova	Dmitrov, Russia
Beth Peterson	Jenna Loder	Katherine Doerksen	Melissa Gordon	Meghan Walter	Winnipeg, Manitoba
Tabitha Peterson	Nina Roth	Becca Hamilton	Tara Peterson	Aileen Geving	(United States) Chaska, Minnesota
Melissa Pierce	Jennifer Van	Megan Anderson	Sarah More		Edmonton, Alberta
Marlee Powers	Jocelyn Adams	Emily Dwyer	Amanda Simpson		Halifax, Nova Scotia
Kim Rhyme	Libby Brundage	Katie Rhyme	Cait Flannery		(United States) Minneapolis, Minnesota
Brette Richards	Blaine de Jager	Alyssa Kyllo	Rachelle Kallechy		Vernon, British Columbia
Fabienne Rieder	Xenia Schwaller	Tina Zürcher	Selina Rychiger	Nadine Rieder	Interlaken, Switzerland
Darcy Robertson	Laura Burtnyk	Gaetanne Gauthier	Krysten Karwacki		Winnipeg, Manitoba
Kelsey Rocque	Danielle Schmiemann	Dana Ferguson	Rachelle Brown		Edmonton, Alberta
Kristin Skaslien (Fourth)	Marianne Rørvik (Skip)	Mille Haslev Nordbye	Martine Rønning	Eli Skaslien	Lillehammer, Norway
Vlada Rumiantseva	Irina Riazanova	Anastasiia Mishchenko	Alexandra Kardapoltseva	Alina Lyotz	Dmitrov, Russia
Jessica Rutter	Kelsey Meger	Lisa Thomas	Jenessa Rutter	Breanne Yozenko	Winnipeg, Manitoba
Anna Samoylik	Kristina Dudko	Anastasia Kosogor	Elena Komleva		Krasnoyarsk, Russia
Deb Santos	Lorna Alfrey	Lil Grabinsky	Sandy Tougas		Sherwood Park, Alberta
Casey Scheidegger	Cary-Anne McTaggart	Jessie Haughian	Kristie Moore		Lethbridge, Alberta
Stephanie Schmidt	Brooklyn Stevenson	Jennifer Armstrong	Rachel Erickson		Regina, Saskatchewan
Lorraine Schneider	Larisa Murray	Ashley Williamson	Jill de Gooijer		Regina, Saskatchewan
Irene Schori	Carole Howald	Lara Stocker	Stefanie Berset		Langenthal, Switzerland
Celine Schwizgebel	Ophélie Gauchat	Marina Hauser	Joëlle Fuss	Emma Suter	Thun, Switzerland
Stephanie Senneker	Maya Willertz	Emilia Juocys	Jenna Burchesky	Elizabeth Demers	(United States) Port Huron, Michigan
Anna Sidorova	Yulia Portunova	Liudmila Privivkova	Maria Ignatenko	Sofia Tkach	Sochi, Russia
Robyn Silvernagle	Kristen Streifel	Jessie Hunkin	Dayna Demers		North Battleford, Saskatchewan
Jamie Sinclair	Monica Walker	Cora Farrell	Elizabeth Cousins		(United States) Charlotte, North Carolina
Kayla Skrlik	Selena Sturmay	Brittany Tran	Ashton Skrlik		Calgary, Alberta
Laurie St-Georges	Hailey Armstrong	Emily Riley	Cynthia St-Georges	Isabelle Thiboutot	Laval, Quebec
Briar Hürlimann (Fourth)	Elena Stern (Skip)	Lisa Gisler	Céline Koller		Brig, Switzerland
Tiffany Steuber	Brittany Martin	Jen Person	Brittany Zelmer		Spruce Grove, Alberta
Taylour Stevens	Lauren Ferguson	Kate Callaghan	Cate Fitzgerald		Halifax, Nova Scotia
Kellie Stiksma	Ocean Pletz	Sara McMann	Chantal Allan		Edmonton, Alberta
Aleksandra Stoyarosova	Ekaterina Kungurova	Aleksandra Moszherina	Tatiana Filyushova		Novosibirsk, Russia
Delaney Strouse	Leah Yavarow	Sydney Mullaney	Rebecca Rodgers	Susan Dudt	(United States) Midland, Michigan
Sierra Sutherland	Adrienne Belliveau	Chelsea Ferrier	Julie Breton	Krysten Elson	Ottawa, Ontario
Ekaterina Telnova	Tatiana Poblagueva	Nika Nikitina	Anastasia Petrova	Daria Kukushkina	Moscow, Russia
Meaghan Thomson	Emily Schweitzer	Olena Pazderska	Allison Kenney	Harley Rohrbacher	(United States) Alpharetta, Georgia
Alina Pätz (Fourth)	Silvana Tirinzoni (Skip)	Esther Neuenschwander	Melanie Barbezat		Aarau, Switzerland
Elizabeth Janiak (Fourth)	Sara Olson	Anne O'Hara	Ariel Traxler (Skip)	Katherine Gourianova	(United States) Fairbanks, Alaska
Elizaveta Trukhina	Nina Polikarpova	Valeria Denisenko	Alina Fakhurtdinova	Viktoria Desova	Irkutsk, Russia
Noémie Verreault	Nathalie Gagnon	Geneviève Frappier	Marie-Claude Comeau		Valleyfield / Rosemère / Alma, Quebec
Laura Walker	Kate Cameron	Taylor McDonald	Nadine Scotland	Cheryl Bernard	Edmonton, Alberta
Emma Wallingford	Rhonda Varnes	Melissa Gannon	Kayla Gray		Ottawa, Ontario
Quinn Walsh	Anneke Burghout	Danielle Miron	Lindsay Geerkens		Cambridge, Ontario
Sarah Wark	Kristen Pilote	Nicky Kaufman	Carley Sandwith	Jen Rusnell	Abbotsford, British Columbia
Maddy Warriner	Alyssa Blad	Madison Fisher	Shannon Warriner		Dundas, Ontario
Katelyn Wasylkiw	Lauren Wasylkiw	Stephanie Thompson	Erin Way		Whitby, Ontario
Maggie Wilson	Hailey Duff	Jennifer Marshall	Eilidh Yeats		Aberdeen, Scotland
Stasia Wisniewski	Chantel Martin	Amanda Kuzyk	Sheri Martin		Regina, Saskatchewan
Rachel Workin	Lexi Lanigan	Ann Podoll	Christina Lammers		(United States) Fargo, North Dakota
Isabella Wranå	Jennie Wåhlin	Almida de Val	Fanny Sjöberg		Sundbyberg, Sweden
Ladina Müller (Fourth)	Nora Wüest (Skip)	Anna Stern	Karin Winter	Lisa Gugler	Wetzikon, Switzerland
Sayaka Yoshimura	Kaho Onodera	Anna Ohmiya	Yumie Funayama		Sapporo, Japan
Mackenzie Zacharias	Karlee Burgess	Emily Zacharias	Lauren Lenentine		Altona, Manitoba
Veronica Zappone	Stefania Constantini	Angela Romei	Giulia Zardini Lacedelli	Elena Dami	Trentino, Italy

== Mixed doubles ==
As of October 30, 2020

Female	Male	Locale
Melissa Adams	Alex Robichaud	Fredericton, New Brunswick
Sarah Anderson	Korey Dropkin	(United States) Chaska, Minnesota
Taylor Anderson	Hunter Clawson	(United States) Minneapolis, Minnesota
Hannah Augustin	Martin Reichel	Kitzbühel, Austria
Madison Bear	Andrew Stopera	(United States) Chaska, Minnesota
Sophie Belley	Roger Lavoie	Clermont, Quebec
Adrienne Belliveau	Jordan McNamara	Ottawa, Ontario
Marie-Jo Billo	Marc Trahan	Trois-Rivières, Quebec
Darah Blandford	Matthew Blandford	Cold Lake, Alberta
Caroline Boily	Daniel Grégoire	Beloeil, Quebec
Florence Boivin	Dimitri Audibert	Alma, Quebec
Veronique Bouchard	Jean-François Charest	Saguenay, Quebec
Shelby Brandt	Grady LaMontagne	Regina, Saskatchewan
Marianne Brassard	Phillipe Brassard	Quebec, Quebec
Chantele Broderson	Kyler Kleibrink	Calgary, Alberta
Jenna Burchesky	Ben Richardson	(United States) Eau Claire, Wisconsin
Michelle Butler	Jerry Butler	Brampton, Ontario
Chelsea Carey	Colin Hodgson	Calgary, Alberta / Winnipeg, Manitoba
Cory Christensen	John Shuster	(United States) Duluth, Minnesota
Alice Cobelli	Amos Mosaner	Cembra Lisignago, Italy
Susana Cole	Tijani Cole	(United States) Denver, Colorado / Lagos, Nigeria
Marie-Claude Comeau	Simon Hebert	Vallyfield, Quebec
Katie Cottrill	Shawn Cottrill	Belgrave, Ontario
Joanne Courtney	Reid Carruthers	Edmonton, Alberta / Winnipeg, Manitoba
Kelsie Cygan	Ethan Chung	Thorsby, Alberta
Cindy Dallaire	Yannick Martel	Saguenay, Quebec
Jill de Gooijer	Garret Springer	Regina, Saskatchewan
Almida de Val	Oskar Eriksson	Karlstad, Sweden
Émilie Desjardins	Robert Desjardins	Saguenay, Quebec
Louise Desrosiers	Alain Bellemare	Quebec, Quebec
Taylor Drees	Joe Heiden	(United States) St. Paul, Minnesota
Layne Engel	Cody Sutherland	Saskatoon, Saskatchewan
Paige Engel	Dallas Burnett	Saskatoon, Saskatchewan
Laura Engler	Tom Winkelhausen	St. Gallen, Switzerland
Michelle Englot	Derek Schneider	Regina, Saskatchewan
Nkeirouka Ezekh	Alexey Stukalskiy	Moscow, Russia
Aline Fellmann	Chris Kovalchuk	Beaconsfield, Quebec
Audrey Foote	Blake Hagberg	(United States) Utica, New York
Astri Forbregd	Andreas Hårstad	Oppdal, Norway
Ingeborg Forbregd	Lukas Høstmælingen	Oppdal, Norway
Anna Fowler	Ben Fowler	London, England
Geneviève Frappier	Martin Begin	Rosemère, Quebec
Susan Froud	Joey Rettinger	Tara, Ontario
Cynthia Furlotte	David Daoust	Sudbury, Ontario
Irantzu Garcia	Gontzal Garcia	Vitoria-Gasteiz, Spain
Aileen Geving	Luc Violette	(United States) Duluth, Minnesota
Tahli Gill	Dean Hewitt	Brisbane, Australia
Anastasia Ginters	Ty Dilello	Altona, Manitoba
Em Good	MacAllan Guy	(United States) Seattle, Washington
Clancy Grandy	Pat Janssen	Pickering, Ontario
Christianne Guay	Gervais Lavoie	Clermont, Quebec
Jessica Guilbault	Ben Jones	St. Catharines, Ontario
Kari Gullickson	Guy Davis	(United States) Blaine, Minnesota
Marie-Pier Harvey	Sebastien Simard	Alma, Quebec
Dezaray Hawes	Tyler Tardi	Langley, British Columbia
Kim Headley	John Headley	Aurora, Ontario
Johanna Heldin	Daniel Magnusson	Uppsala, Sweden
Henriette Lokken Helgevold	Nicolai Sommervold	Hedmarken, Norway
Sarah Hoag	Brayden Grindheim	Regina, Saskatchewan
Kim Hodson	Shawn Hodson	Saskatoon, Saskatchewan
Rachel Homan	John Morris	Calgary, Alberta
Erica Hopson	Kevin Tippett	Ottawa, Ontario
Lauren Horton	Pierre-Luc Morissette	Quebec City, Quebec
Brooklyn Ideson	Owen Henry	London, Ontario
Rikke Iversen	Rune Lorentsen	Nedre Glomma, Norway
Madison Johnson	Dustin Mikush	Saskatoon, Saskatchewan
Jennifer Jones	Brent Laing	Gravenhurst, Ontario
Sherry Just	Ryan Deis	Saskatoon, Saskatchewan
Karoliine Kaare	Mikk Reinsalu	Tallinn, Estonia
Lena Kapp	Marc Muskatewitz	Füssen, Germany
Oona Kauste	Aku Kauste	Hyvinkää, Finland
Rachel Kawleski	John Paul Munich	(United States) Fargo, North Dakota
Kelcee Kennedy	David Baum	Regina, Saskatchewan
Mackenzie Kiemele	Oliver Campbell	Niagara Falls, Ontario
Elizabeth King	Landon King	Yellowknife, Northwest Territories
Chaelynn Kitz	Brayden Stewart	Saskatoon, Saskatchewan
Madison Kleiter	Rylan Kleiter	Saskatoon, Saskatchewan
Marie-Eve Langevin	Jean Langevin	Sherbrooke, Quebec
Lexi Lanigan	Jon Harstad	(United States) Duluth, Minnesota
Audrey Laplante	Jasmin Gibeau	Thurso, Quebec
Marie-Pier Lequin	Simon Morissette	Sherbrooke, Quebec
Catherine Liscumb	Chris Liscumb	Ilderton, Ontario
Daisy MacCallum	Brian Terwedo	(United States) Plymouth, Minnesota
Triin Madisson	Karl Kukner	Tallinn, Estonia
Karine Marchand	Louis-François Brassard	Quebec, Quebec
Anne Marie Marcoux	Daniel Lague	Venise-en-Québec, Quebec
Nancy Martin	Tyrel Griffith	Saskatoon, Saskatchewan
Jodi McCutcheon	John McCutcheon	Toronto, Ontario
Kirstin McKeown	Gabriel Nickel	(United States) Blaine, Minnesota
Christine McMakin	Riley Fenson	(United States) Bemidji, Minnesota
Kelsey Meger	Andrew Peck	Winnipeg, Manitoba
Eirin Mesloe	Willhelm Næss	Oppdal, Norway
Emma Miskew	Ryan Fry	Ottawa / Toronto, Ontario
Clare Moores	Lance Wheeler	(United States) Denver, Colorado
Morgan Muise	Brad Kokoroyannis	Calgary, Alberta
Anna Munroe	Thierry Fournier	Quebec, Quebec
Jestyn Murphy	Ryan O'Neill	Mississauga, Ontario
Alyssa Nedohin	David Nedohin	Edmonton, Alberta
Veronika Neznalová	Matěj Neznal	Prague, Czech Republic
Brenda Nicholls	Dan deWaard	Buckingham, Quebec
Junko Nishimuro	Saturo Tsukamoto	Yamanashi, Japan
Bettina Nordbye	Johan Høstmælingen	Lillehammer, Norway
Mille Haslev Nordbye	Grunde Morten Buraas	Lillehammer, Norway
Ronja Nordhagen	Niclas Engevold Nordhagen	Lillehammer, Norway
Anne O'Hara	Coleman Thurston	(United States) Chaska, Minnesota
Nora Østgård	Haakon Horvli	Oppdal, Norway
Oihane Otaegi	Mikel Unanue	San Sebastián, Spain
Lisianne Ouellet	Guillaume Rousseau	Rivière-du-Loup, Quebec
Alina Pätz	Sven Michel	Aarau, Switzerland
Dorottya Palancsa	Zsolt Kiss	Budapest, Hungary
Paige Papley	Evan van Amsterdam	Edmonton, Alberta
Zuzana Paulová	Tomáš Paul	Prague, Czech Republic
Christa Perepelitza	Rodney Ouellette	Cold Lake, Alberta
Jenny Perret	Martin Rios	Glarus, Switzerland
Vicky Persinger	Chris Plys	(United States) Chaska, Minnesota
Jocelyn Peterman	Brett Gallant	Winnipeg, Manitoba / St. John's, Newfoundland and Labrador
Tabitha Peterson	Joe Polo	(United States) Chaska, Minnesota
Tara Peterson	Kroy Nernberger	(United States) Chaska, Minnesota
Anniken Pettersen	Odd Persokrud	Jevnaker, Norway
Ann Podoll	Nathan Parry	(United States) Fargo, North Dakota
Ashley Quick	Mike Armstrong	Regina, Saskatchewan
Maia Ramsfjell	Magnus Ramsfjell	Stabekk, Norway
Amelie Ratte	Denis Guay	Clermont, Quebec
Amy Remeshylo	Andrew Derksen	Regina, Saskatchewan
Elise Rene	Michel Tremblay	Clermont, Quebec
Kim Rhyme	Jason Smith	(United States) Saint Paul, Minnesota
Paige Riley	Joe Brownson	Belleville, Ontario
Paula Ritchie	Carl deConinck Smith	Regina, Saskatchewan
Carrie Robertson	Alex Robertson	St. Marys, Ontario
Kelsey Rocque	Braden Calvert	Edmonton, Alberta / Winnipeg, Manitoba
Martine Rønning	Mathias Brænden	Lillehammer, Norway
Harley Rohrbacher	Nicholas Visnich	(United States) Pittsburgh, Pennsylvania
Angela Romei	Joël Retornaz	Pinerolo, Italy
Marianne Rørvik	Torger Nergård	Lillehammer, Norway
Dany Roy	Bruno Sonier	Sherbrooke, Quebec
Beate Ruden	Tom Borgersen	Jevnaker, Norway
Daniela Rupp	Kevin Wunderlin	Aarau, Switzerland
Kadriana Sahaidak	Colton Lott	Winnipeg Beach, Manitoba
Sophie Sanscartier	Maxandre Caron	Boucherville, Quebec
Bobbie Sauder	Brendan Bottcher	Edmonton, Alberta
Mathilde Sauvageau	Leandre Girard	Quebec, Quebec
Julie Savard	Bernard Auchu	Clermont, Quebec
Carla Sawicki	Ben Gamble	Regina, Saskatchewan
Danielle Schmiemann	Jason Ginter	Edmonton, Alberta
Pia-Lisa Schöll	Klaudius Harsch	Füssen, Germany
Mackenzie Schwartz	Sam Wills	Weyburn, Saskatchewan
Emily Schweitzer	Blake Hagberg	(United States) Saint Paul, Minnesota
Courtney Shaw	Melvin Shaw	(United States) Washington, D.C.
Krista Shortridge	Cody Smith	Lethbridge, Alberta
Dawn Sihils	Cordell Sihils	Tofield, Alberta
Ginette Simard	Steve Villrneuve	Chicoutimi, Quebec
Jamie Sinclair	Rich Ruohonen	(United States) Chaska, Minnesota
Emma Sjödin	Niklas Edin	Karlstad, Sweden
Ingvild Skaga	Tobias Linneberg	Stabekk, Norway
Kristin Skaslien	Magnus Nedregotten	Oppdal, Norway
Kayla Skrlik	Gregg Hamilton	Calgary, Alberta
Cynthia St-Georges	Yannick Martel	Chicoutimi, Quebec
Jayne Stirling	Fraser Kingan	Stirling, Scotland
Maureen Stolt	Peter Stolt	(United States) Plymouth, Minnesota
Taylor Stremick	Logan Ede	Regina, Saskatchewan
Delaney Strouse	Nicholas Connolly	(United States) Midland, Michigan
Nina Summerova	Jan Horacek	Bratislava, Slovakia
Sierra Sutherland	John Willsey	Orillia, Ontario
Val Sweeting	Marc Kennedy	St. Paul, Alberta
Ildikó Szekeres	György Nagy	Budapest, Hungary
Tomoko Takeda	Naomasa Takeda	Nayoro, Japan
Marcella Tammes	Andres Jakobson	Tallinn, Estonia
Ashley Taylor	Brian Taylor	Saskatoon, Saskatchewan
Ashley Thevenot	Dustin Kalthoff	Saskatoon, Saskatchewan
Karla Thompson	Nathan Small	Kamloops, British Columbia
Silvana Tirinzoni	Benoît Schwarz	Geneva, Switzerland
Brittany Tran	Aaron Sluchinski	Red Deer, Alberta
Kelly Tremblay	Pierre Lanoue	Beloeil, Quebec
Kim Tuck	Wayne Tuck Jr.	Strathroy, Ontario
Marie-Josée Turcotte	Frederic Tremblay	Clermont, Quebec
Marie Turmann	Harri Lill	Tallinn, Estonia
Noémie Verreault	Remi Savard	Chicoutimi, Quebec
Therese Westman	Robin Ahlberg	Stockholm, Sweden
Adela Walczak	Andrzej Augustyniak	Łódź, Poland
Laura Walker	Kirk Muyres	Edmonton, Alberta / Saskatoon, Saskatchewan
Monica Walker	Alec Leichter	(United States) Boston, Massachusetts
Maddy Warriner	Charlie Richard	Woodstock, Ontario
Lisa Weagle	John Epping	Toronto, Ontario
Nicole Westlund Stewart	Tyler Stewart	Ayr, Ontario
Natalie Wiksten	Kasper Wiksten	Tårnby, Denmark
Sarah Wilkes	Brad Thiessen	Edmonton, Alberta
Ashley Williamson	Justin Heather	Regina, Saskatchewan
Katrine Wolla	Kjell Bjørsteth	Hedmarken, Norway
Becca Wood	Shawn Banyai	(United States) Denver, Colorado
Rachel Workin	Evan Workin	(United States) Fargo, North Dakota
Isabella Wranå	Rasmus Wranå	Stockholm, Sweden
Samantha Yachiw	Jordan Raymond	Saskatoon, Saskatchewan
