= Beatty Brothers Limited =

- Industry: Manufacturing
- Founded: 1874; 152 years ago
- Founders: George Beatty; Matthew Beatty
- Defunct: 1969
- Headquarters: Fergus, Ontario, Canada
- Products: Agricultural machinery, home appliances, tools

Beatty Brothers Limited was a major international manufacturer of agricultural machinery, barn and stable equipment, and household appliances, which was based in Fergus, Ontario, Canada. It was founded in 1874 by brothers George and Matthew Beatty, and reached its peak in the 1900s–1930s under William G. and Milton J. Beatty, George's sons. In 1969 it was merged with General Steel Wares to become a part of GSW Limited, and became defunct as an independent company. It is credited as having popularized the washing machine in Canada, as well as incorporating a key component, the agitator, into its designs starting in the 1920s, a component which is today found in virtually all top-loading washing machines.

In later years, the company's operations were continued by GSW Limited, Beatty Division, and a facility of A. O. Smith.

== History ==
=== Early history ===
George Beatty was born in 1845 to Irish parents on a farm in Albion Township, which today is a part of Caledon, Ontario. He grew up on the farm with his brother, Matthew (born in 1838), who remained a farmer for much of his life. George, however, left home at the age of 18 to apprentice as a machinist with Haggert Brothers in Brampton, a firm specializing in the manufacture of threshers. At the time, agricultural machinery in Ontario was only beginning to be manufactured according to standardized designs, and George was dissatisfied with the quality of the implements being made. As well, most implements and machines were being manufactured by small "village industries", which often employed only a few dozen people and sold a wide range of non-standard products to a local market, aiming to completely fulfill the needs of their local community. However, this did not create many possibilities for the implementation of advanced designs or allow for efficiencies of scale in production, which caused many of the small firms of the 19th century to gradually expand and modernize or be absorbed by larger manufacturers.

After completing his apprenticeship with Haggert Brothers, George moved to the agricultural community of Fergus, Ontario where, along with his brother Matthew and four or five helpers, he founded a small manufacturing firm, Beatty Brothers, renting Fergus' old Temperance Hall. Beatty Brothers soon acquired an existing company producing farm implements, Grindley, giving the Beatty Brothers access to Grindley's factory and hydroelectric generating plant, which was powered by a dam built on the Grand River. Grindley was a manufacturer of a wide range of products, from agricultural machinery like reapers and ploughs to more domestic items, such as stoves and kitchen utensils. The Beatty brothers chose to focus on their original specialty of agricultural machinery, and the firm quickly became a success, being awarded a bronze medal for engineering excellence for their reaper design at the 1879 Toronto Industrial Exhibition, the predecessor to today's Canadian National Exhibition.

During these early years, the company would rapidly acquire and develop more space as it grew, quickly dominating the downtown core of Fergus. In 1876, it acquired "the Foundry", which would become the cornerstone of its production facilities. A three-storey addition was constructed in 1880, followed by a one-storey addition in the early 20th century, which featured a distinctive sawtooth roof line. This building, whose architecture is largely unchanged from that time, is today a significant heritage building in the community which now serves as the Fergus Marketplace and has a number of commercial tenants and restaurants.

Matthew Beatty died in 1886, but the pace of the company's development did not slow. Until the close of the 19th century, Beatty Brothers, under the sole ownership and management of George Beatty, continued to manufacture agricultural machinery, gradually releasing new items and improving the designs of existing ones. The company became an adopter of many turn-of-the-century manufacturing innovations, such as simplification of designs and mass production, moving toward a standardized catalogue of products sold under the Beatty Brothers brand.

=== Second generation ===
The turn of the century marked many changes for the company. In 1900, production was shifted from farming equipment, such as reapers and mowers, to barn and stable equipment. In the next year, 1901, George's sons, William G. Beatty and Milton J. Beatty, graduated from the University of Toronto and joined their father in managing the business. William quickly specialized in the engineering and production side of the company, while Milton worked as a salesman. Nevertheless, they registered a number of joint patents starting in 1905, both with each other and with their father. William Beatty would eventually acquire over 300 patents, reportedly more than any other Canadian at the time. He was aided in this endeavour by Teddy Ecclestone, a blacksmith, and the brothers George and Bob Maude, who had been minor inventors before becoming Beatty employees. Any inventions developed by the company were to continue to be patented under William Beatty's name, and patent issues arose regularly.

Not long after, Beatty Brothers undertook a major expansion and pattern of acquisitions, raising capital from outside investors in the process. This began with the acquisition of Wortman and Ward, a London-based manufacturer of water pumps and washing machines, for $200,000 in 1912. This would mark the entry of Beatty Brothers into the growing washing machine and domestic appliance market, where they would ultimately produce some of their most notable designs. As home electrification took Ontario by storm, electric appliance sales became an increasingly lucrative source of income for manufacturers, and there was a strong desire to market these products to a national, rather than regional, customer base. W.G. and M.J. Beatty were able to capitalize on Wortman and Ward's existing business connections in Western Canada and the Maritimes to expand the Beatty Brothers brand's retail presence to a fully national scale for the first time. Around this time their product range had stabilized around 35 different products, which included pumps, washing machines, and a range of barn and stable equipment, such as ladders.

The First World War marked a point of high Beatty influence in Fergus. The family took pride in their Irish identity, in contrast to the predominantly Scottish local population. They also heavily promoted Methodism amongst their employees and within the local community, alongside promoting contemporary Methodist values and political initiatives, such as the temperance movement and opposition to sex work. They also made informal attempts to enforce prohibition within the community by taking the extreme step of buying up and demolishing taverns and brothels through proxy agents, destroying many historic buildings in the community in the process. Sunday shopping was restricted in order to promote Sabbatarianism, and there were attempts to censor the local library over concerns about "unsavoury" literature.

These acts, both successful and unsuccessful, reflected the level of Beatty influence in Fergus, and were also typical behaviour from industrialists at the time, who saw the local communities near their factories in a managerial light. While the Beatty family expressed their influence through the Methodist Church and political Methodism in order to try to align the local community with their vision of a harmonious society, their actions were not dissimilar to the archetypal paternal industrialist of the era, Henry Ford, whose Sociological Department attempted to use quasi-scientific justifications for monitoring and managing the private lives of his workers and their families, attempting to "weed out" disgruntled employees, labour militants, and workers who had not sufficiently assimilated to a 20th-century American lifestyle and culture. Dominant narratives at the time treated social problems such as alcoholism and drug abuse, political and social movements such as communism and trade unionism, informal economies such as sex work, and lack of religious observance as individual moral failings which should be remedied before they spread throughout the community. The Financial Post celebrated the absence of strikes and overt labour militancy at the company, which was unusual at the time, even despite the company's notoriously low wages and ten-hour work days.

Factors such as these made the Beatty brothers unwilling to relocate to a more significant manufacturing centre such as Hamilton or Toronto, despite the logistical and workforce supply advantages this would convey. Instead, they would continue to develop their industrial complex in Fergus, where they could continue to pay lower-than-prevailing wages and pollution from the Foundry created an "Acid Pond" between Hill Street and St Patrick Street. Therefore, Fergus stayed as the headquarters of the company even as it began to rapidly expand.

=== Peak and decline ===
From the mid-1900s through the 1920s, Beatty Brothers rapidly acquired other Canadian manufacturing companies, such as the James Provan Company of Oshawa in 1904, Whitman and Barnes of St. Catharines in 1906, Cameron and Dunn of Strathroy in 1908, Tolton Brothers of Guelph and Emerson and Campbell of Tweed in 1909, the assets of R. Dillon and Sons of Oshawa in 1923, Cowan and Company of Gananoque, the 1900 Washer Company of Canada, and the Clements Manufacturing Company of Toronto. This allowed Beatty Brothers to consolidate their manufacturing base in Ontario and absorb many of the smaller village manufacturers throughout the province, giving the company ownership of their patents and product lines.

By the mid-1920s, the company had begun to expand internationally and operate plants in Britain, elevating it to the status of a Commonwealth manufacturer, rather than simply a Canadian one, and bringing it closer to the level of prestige of large British manufacturing firms. By 1925, it was reportedly the largest producer and exporter of barn and stable equipment in the British Empire, and in 1928, it was selling a range of over 600 different products throughout Canada, the United Kingdom, Australia, and New Zealand.

The company reached its technological peak in 1927, when it pioneered the use of the agitator in the design of washing machines, which spun clothes around a tub in circular fashion, preventing them from getting clumped or tangled. The Beatty electric washing machine was the bridge between two realities for the Beatty company: a rurally-based manufacturer of agricultural equipment which also produced sleek, modern appliances suited to the 20th century domestic household. The electric washing machine's technology was the culmination of years of refinement of water pump and washing machine technology which originated with utilitarian farm machinery, but which now, branded and given an attractive design, could be marketed to ordinary consumers.

The company suffered during the Great Depression, but focused on retaining the workforce of longtime employees it had carefully cultivated, allowing it to eventually emerge relatively unscathed. The bankruptcy and decline of competitors allowed it to reach an even stronger position of market dominance, and by 1930 it controlled 75% of the hay carrier market in Canada. It was even able to embark on another, more brief wave of acquisitions: Superior Barn Equipment of Fergus in 1931, the assets of Guelph's Louden Machine Company of Canada in 1932, Gould, Shapley and Muir of Brantford in 1934, and the Galt Machine and Screw Company in 1936. In 1937, the company had offices in Saint John, Montreal, Winnipeg, Edmonton, Vernon, Vancouver, London (England), and Wellington, New Zealand, as well as its headquarters in Fergus. By 1939 there were at least 100 sales offices across Canada, along with stores and branch factories in England and New Zealand.

During the Second World War, the conservative family-based management of the company began to encounter difficulties in adapting to the changing culture in Canada during the mid-20th century, as women began to work in the factory during wartime, disrupting the relatively static atmosphere of the plant's longtime male workforce and management. The workforce quickly became one-third female, and the company profited considerably, as it paid them less. While Beatty's home appliance product line was considered nonessential during the war, the company's factories were kept busy after being retooled for war production, creating primer shells, shell boxes, and even naval gun turrets. By the end of the war, unions had been organized for both the factory floor and the office, and the town of Fergus voted to allow the sale of alcohol. The Beatty family's power was largely gone.

After the war, the company resumed its appliance production, but suffered from having to compete in an increasingly crowded market. Without the capital to continue to acquire patents through acquisition of other companies, or the design and engineering talents of George Beatty, the company became increasingly hemmed in, as major American manufacturers such as Westinghouse and General Electric began to overcome pre-NAFTA trade barriers by establishing plants in Canada, a common business practice at the time for American manufacturers hoping to break into the Canadian postwar consumer market.

The labour situation at Beatty remained troubled, and the company was involved in multiple labour arbitration cases throughout the 1950s and 60s (e.g. Beatty Brothers vs. John S. MacKenzie et al., 1965). It still remained a significant regional influence within the manufacturing centres of southern Ontario west of Toronto, with a number of companies operating feeder plants that produced parts for Beatty Brothers appliances. Linamar founder Frank Hasenfratz worked for Sheepridge Engineering in Guelph for several years in the 1950s when it produced precision parts for Beatty.

=== GSW Limited ===
The Beatty family sold their shares in the company in May 1961 to Ralph M. Barford, Robert A. Stevens, and George Gardiner. The company's assets were sold to General Steel Wares Limited of Toronto for $1.3 million in cash and 150,000 shares of GSW stock. Beatty Brothers Limited then merged with General Steel Wares in 1969 to create GSW Limited. Thereafter it was known internally as GSW's Beatty Division, and some of the original Beatty branding was retained, though the product line had narrowed to production of water heaters.

GSW Limited was purchased in 2006 by A. O. Smith, a Milwaukee-based multinational appliance manufacturer. In 2013, A. O. Smith announced the closure of its 500,000 square foot (46,000 m^{2}) plant at 599 Hill Street West in Fergus, with the loss of 350 jobs. At the time, the only remaining product made at the plant was water heaters. The closure of this plant brought the Beatty Brothers legacy to a final close.

== Heritage ==
The remnants of Beatty influence can be felt throughout Fergus, where the Foundry (now the Fergus Marketplace) still stands as a testament to the scale of their operations. The Melville United Church's Sunday School Hall, constructed with the support of the Beatty family in 1930, is a surviving piece of the family's commitment to the United Church and its financial investment in the town. Beatty Brothers-branded machinery and appliances were once ubiquitous throughout Canada, especially on farms, and can be found in museums. Their characteristic designs are sometimes used to represent the early 20th century era of early mechanized farming in Canada, such as the stylized Beatty Pumper Windmill that is used as a component in the logo of the Anderson Farm Museum in Lively, Ontario, a representation of the reconstructed model that stands on the museum grounds today.

== See also ==
- A. O. Smith
- Fergus, Ontario

== Bibliography ==
- Smith, Gordon (1934). "Beatty Brothers of Fergus, Celebrates Sixtieth Anniversary --Founded by Two Brothers and Is Now Run by Two Brothers". Western Libraries; Business and History.
- Beatty Stable Equipment: Barn Building Section No. 1. Beatty Bros. Ltd. 1949.
