= List of tallest buildings in Greater Sudbury =

Tall buildings in Greater Sudbury
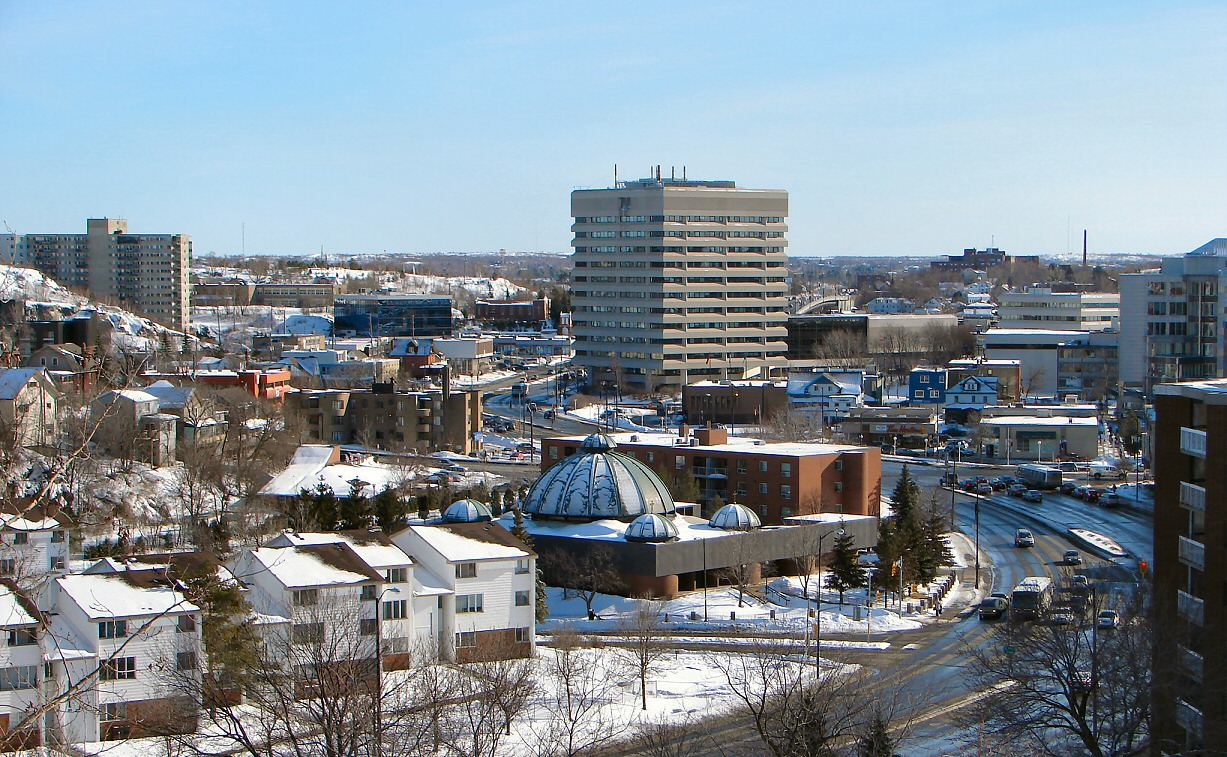
- Downtown Sudbury in 2018
- Tallest building: Tom Davies Square (1977)
- Tallest building height: 54 m (177 ft)

Number of tall buildings
- 10 stories or more: 20 (2025)
- Taller than 50 m (164 ft): 2

Sudbury is the largest city in Northern Ontario. Sudbury has 15 buildings that stand taller than 35 m (115 ft). The tallest building in the city is the 12-storey, 54 m (177 ft) Tom Davies Square, an office building constructed in 1977. The second-tallest building in the city is Rockview Towers, standing at 51 m (167 ft) tall with 17 storeys. As of August 2023, the city contains 15 highrises over 35 m (115 ft) and only 2 skyscrapers that exceed 50 m (164 ft) in height.

The latest high-rise built in Sudbury is Laurentian University East Residence, a student accommodation building for students at Laurentian University. It was completed in 2012. There are currently no high-rises under construction; however, two are approved for construction in Sudbury, to be an extension to the Cherry Gardens complex. Three towers are also proposed at the former St. Joseph's Health Centre, 2 of which would hold the title for the tallest building in the city.

== Tallest buildings ==
This list ranks buildings in Greater Sudbury that stand at least 35 m (114.8 ft) tall, based on CTBUH height measurement standards. This includes spires and architectural details but does not include antenna masts.

Rank	Building	Address	Location	Height	Floors	Completed	Use	Notes	Ref
1	Tom Davies Square	200 Brady Street	Downtown	54 m (177 ft)	12	1977	Office		
2	Rockview Towers	1250 Ramsey View Court	Lockerby	51 m (167 ft)	17	1984	Residential		
3=	Bonik Tower	1016 Arthur Street	New Sudbury	49 m (161 ft)	14		Residential		
3=	The R.D. Parker Building	935 Ramsey Lake Road	Laurentian University	49 m (161 ft)	11		Office		
5	Balmoral Apartments	720 Bruce Avenue	Cambrian Heights	48 m (157 ft)	16		Residential		
6	Starbury Towers	400 Telstar Avenue	Moon Glow	38 m (125 ft)	13		Residential		
7	Cherry Gardens	263 Brady Street	Downtown	43 m (141 ft)	14		Residential		
8	Temellini Apartments	901 LaSalle Boulevard	New Sudbury	42 m (138 ft)	14	1973	Residential		
9	Laurentian University East Residence	935 Ramsey Lake Road	Laurentian University	39 m (128 ft)	12	2012	Residential		
10=	Lockerby Towers	256 Caswell Drive	Moon Glow	38 m (125 ft)	13		Residential		
10=	Stop 2200 Apartments	2200 Regent Street South	Moon Glow	38 m (125 ft)	12		Residential		
10=	City View Gardens	200 Ste. Anne Road	Downtown	38 m (125 ft)	12		Residential		
10=	1960 Paris Street	1960 Paris Street	Moon Glow	38 m (125 ft)	12		Residential		
14	University College Residence	935 Ramsey Lake Road	Laurentian University	36 m (118 ft)	11		Residential		
15	St Andrew's Place	111 Larch Street	Downtown	35 m (115 ft)	11		Residential		

== Projects ==
=== Approved ===
This is a list approved buildings that are planned to rise to over 30 m (98 ft) tall.

Building	Location	Height	Floors	Use	Ref
Project Manitou Tower A	Downtown	?	17	Residential	
Project Manitou Tower B	Downtown	?	17	Residential	

=== Proposed ===
This is a list of proposed buildings that are planned to rise to over 30 m (98 ft) tall.

Building	Location	Height	Floors	Use	Ref
28 Paris Street Tower B	Bell Park	68.2 m (224 ft)	20	Residential	
28 Paris Street Tower A	Bell Park	56 m (184 ft)	16	Residential	
28 Paris Street Tower C	Bell Park	40 m (131 ft)	12	Residential	

== Other significant structures ==
=== Inco Superstack ===
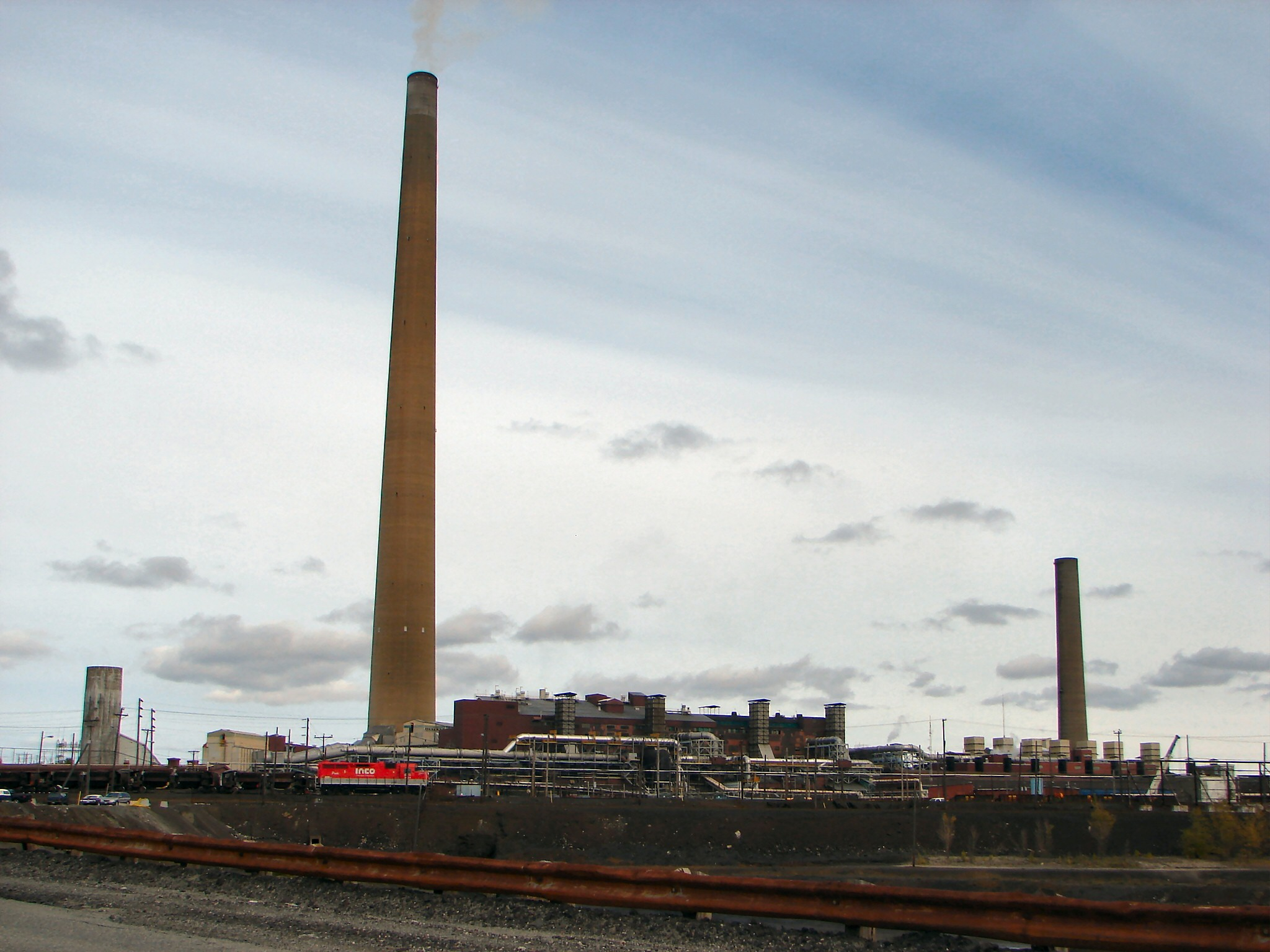
The Inco Superstack at the Inco Copper Cliff smelter.

The Inco Superstack, with a height of 380 meters (1,250 ft), is the tallest chimney in Canada and the Western Hemisphere, and the second tallest freestanding chimney in the world after the GRES-2 Power Station in Kazakhstan. The Superstack is approximately 15 cm (6") shorter than the Empire State Building in New York City. It is also the second tallest freestanding structure of any type in Canada, ranking behind the CN Tower but ahead of First Canadian Place, and the 27th tallest freestanding structure in the world. The Superstack sits atop the largest nickel smelting operation in the world at Inco's Copper Cliff processing facility in the city of Greater Sudbury.

It was constructed in 1972 by Inco Limited at an estimated cost of 25 million dollars; from the date of its completion until the GRES-2 chimney was constructed in 1987, it was the world's tallest smokestack. Between the years 1972–75 it was the tallest freestanding structure in Canada.

The structure was built to disperse sulphur gases and other byproducts of the smelting process away from the city itself. As a result, these gases can be detected in the atmosphere around Greater Sudbury in a 240 kilometers (150 mi) radius of the Inco plant. Prior to the construction of the Superstack, the waste gases contributed to severe local ecological damage.

In 2018, Vale announced that the stack will be decommissioned and dismantled beginning in 2020.

Mclennan Design firm has come up with a proposal to retrofit the Superstack via Adaptive Reuse, as a Renewable Energy structure, capable of providing enough electricity to power Copper Cliff or the VALE operations below. In their proposal called: "From Superstack to Solar Stack — Creating a New Icon for Sudbury"

=== Science North ===
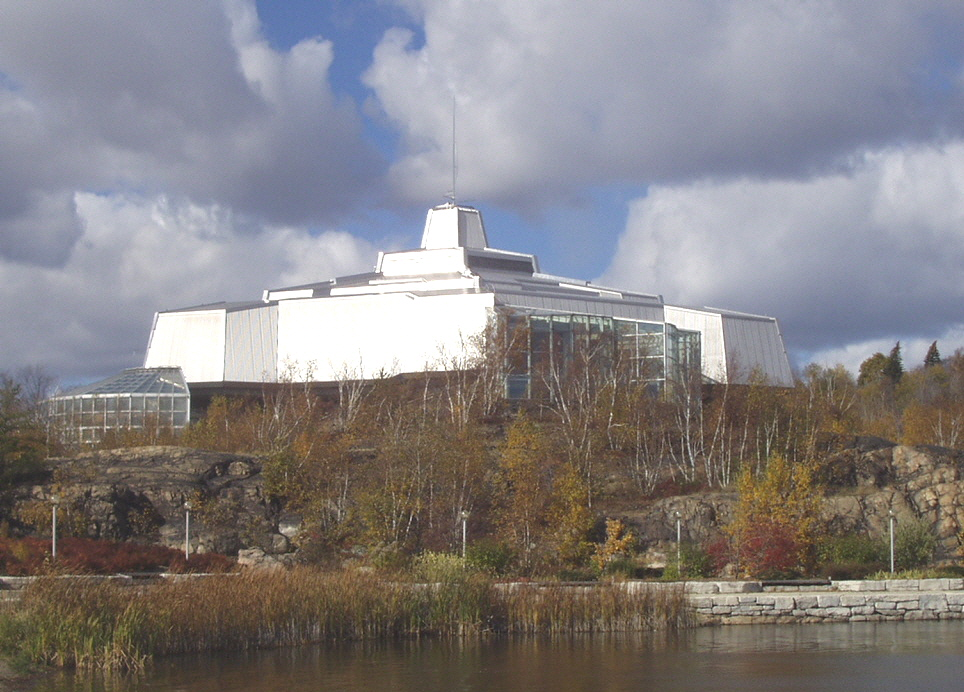
The Science North main building

Science North is an interactive science museum.

The complex, which is Northern Ontario's most popular tourist attraction, consists of two snowflake-shaped buildings on the southwestern shore of Lake Ramsey, just south of the city's downtown core, as well as a former ice hockey arena which includes the complex's entrance and an IMAX theatre. The snowflake buildings are connected by a rock tunnel, which passes through a billion-year-old geologic fault. This fault line was not known to be under the complex during the construction of the building in the early 1980s. Where the walkway reaches the larger snowflake, the Inco Cavern auditorium is frequently used for temporary exhibits, as well as for press conferences and other gala events.

== See also ==
- List of historic places in Greater Sudbury
- List of tallest buildings in Ontario
