= École Saint-Louis-de-Gonzague (Sudbury) =

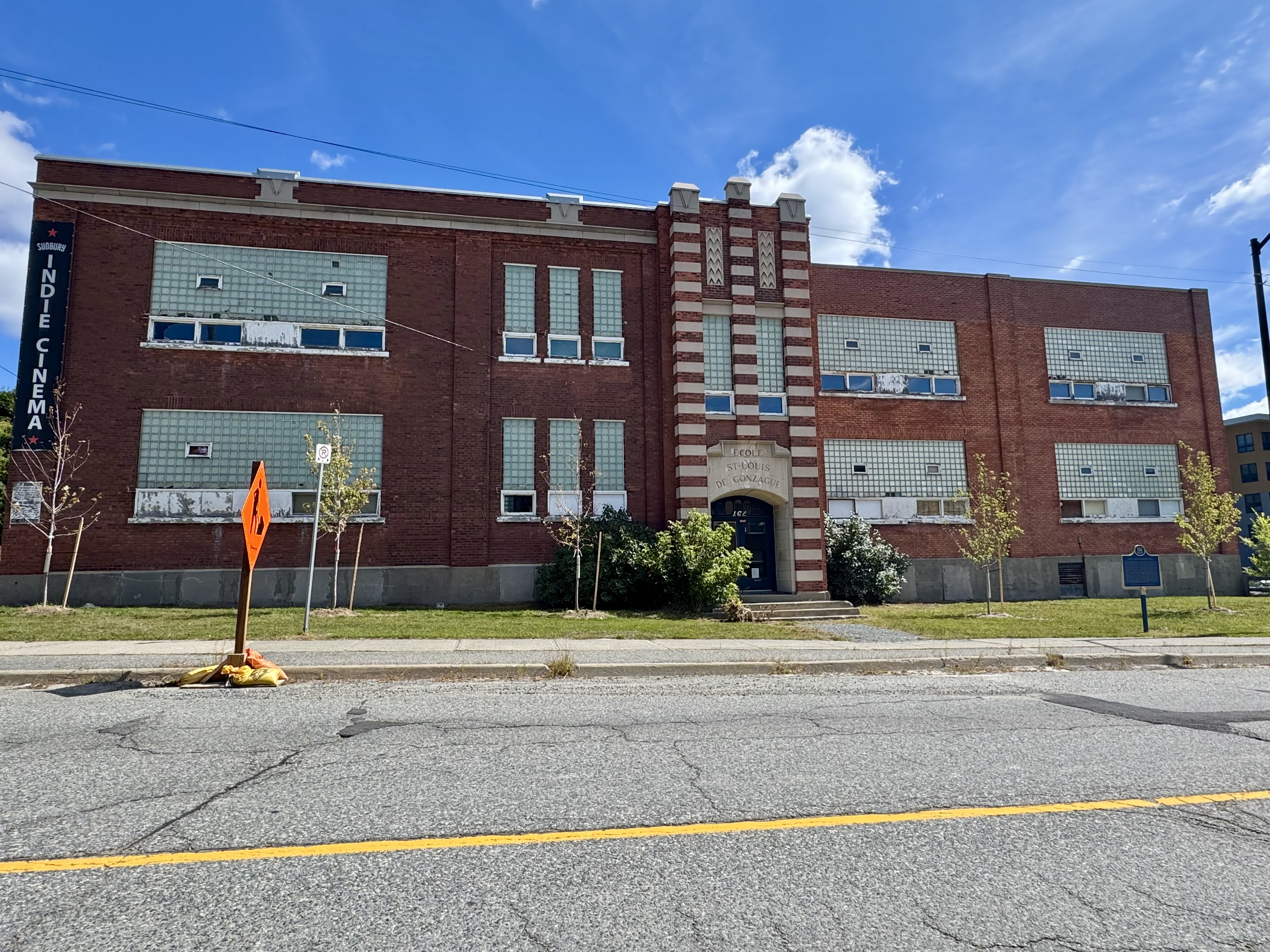
- École Saint-Louis-de-Gonzague in 2025
- Interactive map of École Saint-Louis-de-Gonzague
- Location: 162 MacKenzie Street; Sudbury, Ontario; P3C 4X8
- Coordinates: 46°29′48″N 80°59′51″W
- Built: 1915
- Architect: Peter James O'Gorman
- Architectural styles: Collegiate Gothic, Art Deco

Ontario Heritage Act
- Designated: December 15, 2020
- Reference no.: 26121

École Saint-Louis de Gonzague is a historic building and former school in the Uptown neighbourhood of Sudbury, Ontario, Canada. Constructed in 1915, it is the oldest school building still standing in Sudbury. The school instructed in French despite the enactment of Regulation 17 in 1912, which limited French-language education in Ontario, until it was repealed in 1927. The school closed in 2000, and the Sudbury Indie Cinema Co-op operates from the former gymnasium. The building was designated under the Ontario Heritage Act in 2023.

== History ==
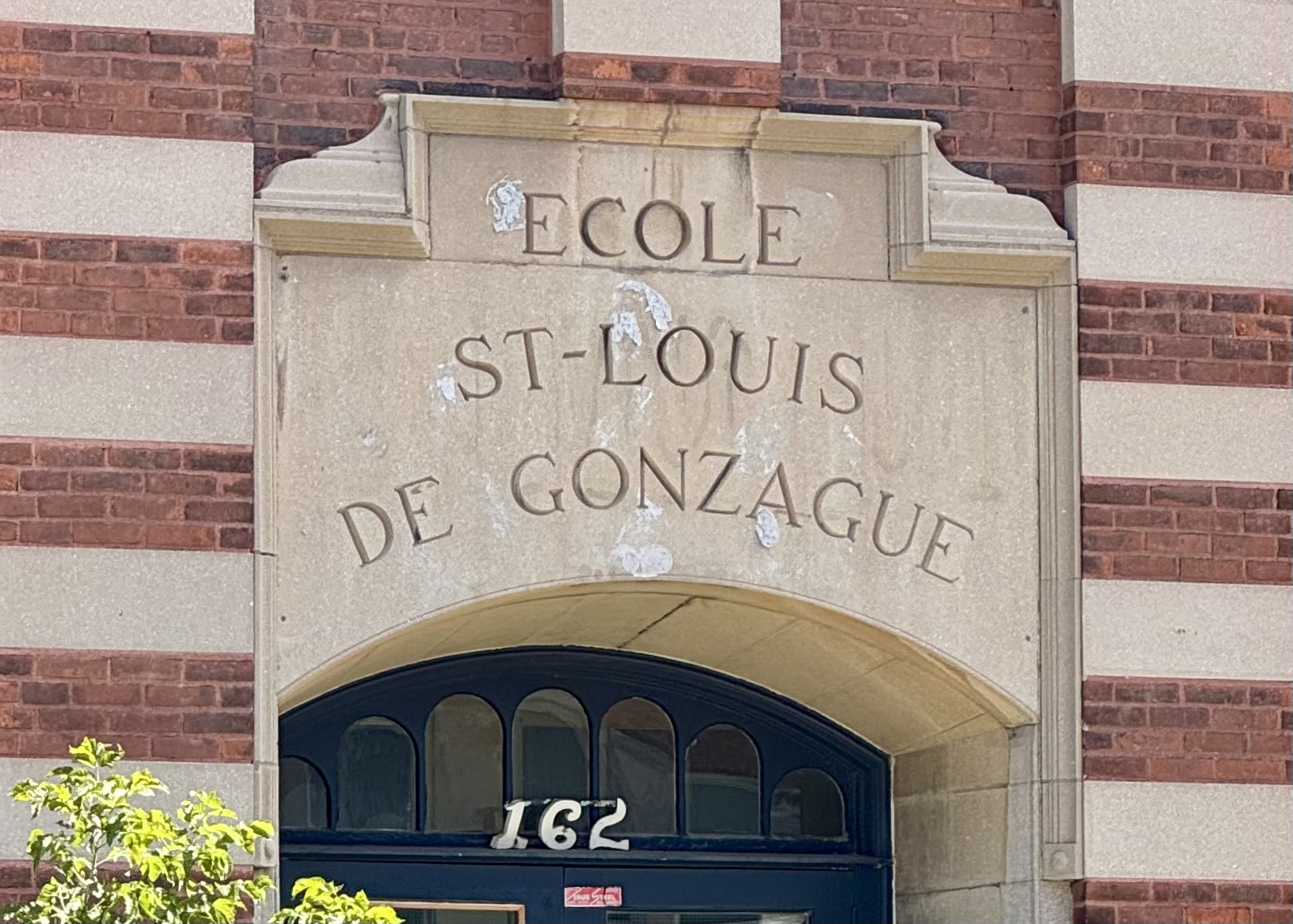
Main entrance of the 1931 wing

Construction of the school began in July 1914 at a cost of C$50,000, and it officially opened on January 18, 1915, as the Central Separate School at what was then the corner of McKenzie and Davidson streets.

Classes were initially held in both English and French. Until the repeal of Regulation 17 in 1927, which limited French-language education in Ontario beyond grade 2, the use of French was hidden from provincial inspectors during visits. In 1923, the school was renamed for Saint Aloysius Gonzaga and the school became exclusively French.

Secondary education was moved to Sudbury High School in 1940. Students in Grades 9 and 10 moved there in 1968, until the opening of Ecole secondaire MacDonald-Cartier in 1969. Thereafter, the school served as an elementary school until it closed in 2000.

In 2019, the Sudbury Indie Cinema Co-op began operating in the former gymnasium of the school. The building was designated as a heritage site in 2023, with a Ontario Heritage Trust plaque being installed in front of the building.

== Architecture ==
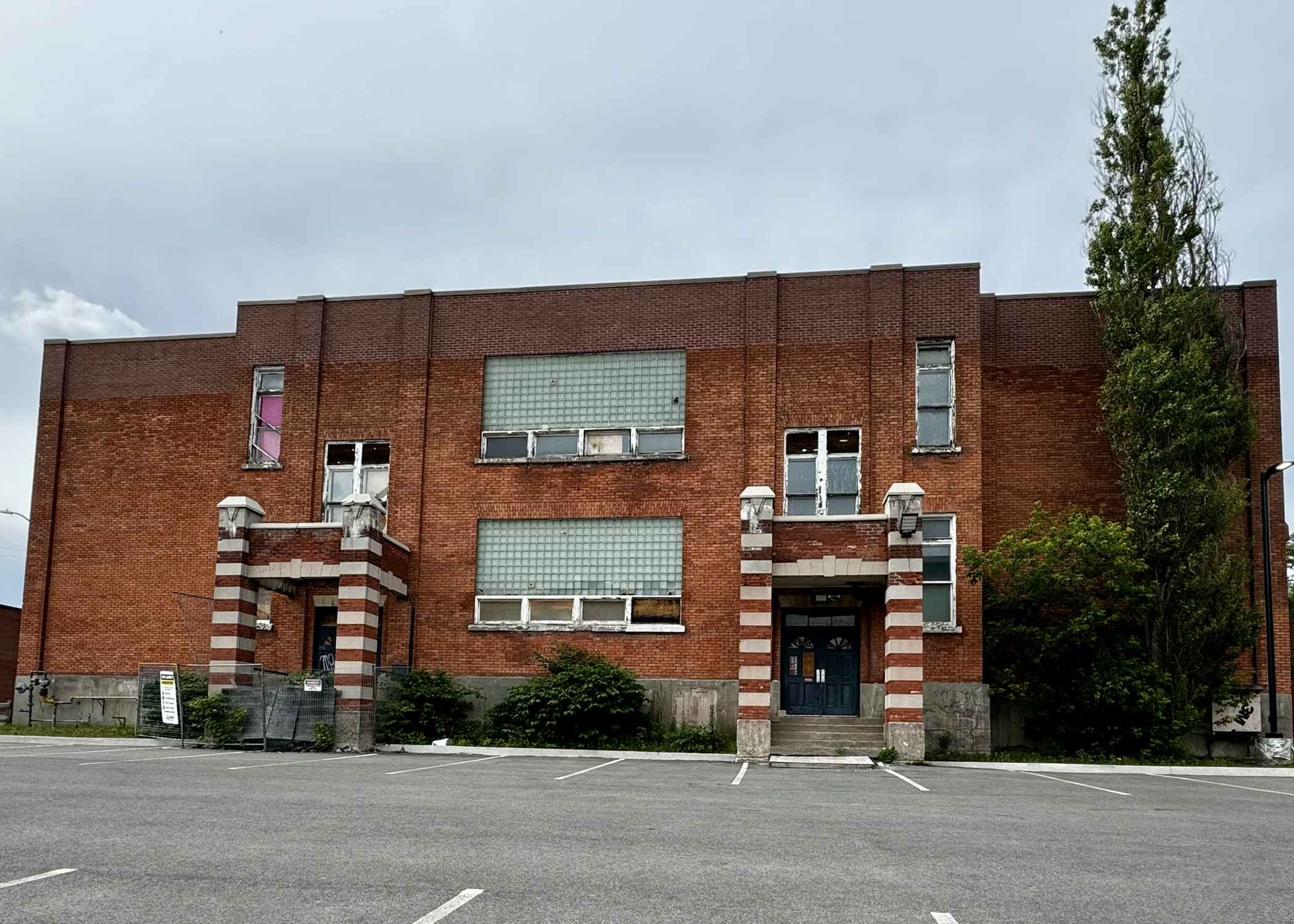
The original 1915 wing of the school

The original 9,800 square feet (910 m^{2}) structure from 1915 originally faced Davidson Street until the construction of the English St. Aloysius School in 1923. St. Aloysius School was demolished in 2016.

The building was constructed using local materials, with 450,000 bricks manufactured by the Sudbury Brick Company and lumber sourced from the Laberge Lumber Company. It was the first building in Sudbury with a mechanical plenum ventilation system.

The interior was finished with birch floors, golden oak trim, and tin ceilings. Some of the tin ceilings were later repurposed for Place des Arts, a Franco-Ontarian arts centre that opened in 2022.

To accommodate more students, a four-room art deco extension to the school was completed in 1931. The building was renovated and a gymnasium was added in 1994.

== Notable alumni ==
- Alex Trebek
- Robert Paquette

== See also ==
- List of historic places in Greater Sudbury
