= École secondaire Macdonald-Cartier =

School in Sudbury, Ontario, Canada

Location
- 37 Lasalle Blvd. Sudbury, Ontario; Canada; 46.5216°N 80.9889°W

Information
- School type: Secondary
- School board: CSPGNO
- Principal: Josée Tremblay
- Grades: 7–12
- Language: French
- Colours: Red and blue
- Team name: Panthères
- Website: esmc.grandnord.ca

École secondaire Macdonald-Cartier (ÉSMC) is a French-language high school in Sudbury, Ontario. The school was named after two of the fathers of Canadian Confederation: John A. Macdonald (1815–1891) and George-Étienne Cartier (1814–1873).

The school is noted for the Les Draveurs theatre troupe.

== History ==
École secondaire Macdonald-Cartier opened in 1969. A couple months after it opened, it changed sites to the first building purpose-build for a public francophone secondary school.

== Programs ==
ÉSMC offers Specialist High Skills Major programs in health and wellness, arts and culture, and mining. It also has a STEM-specialisation program called 4e dimension.

== Notable alumni ==
- Daniel Bédard, musician, composer, arranger, record producer, and audio engineer
- Chuck Labelle, singer-songwriter
- Cloé Lacasse, professional soccer player
- Robert Marinier, actor and playwright
- Alex Tétreault, writer

== See also ==
- Conseil scolaire de district du Grand Nord de l'Ontario
- Education in Ontario
- List of secondary schools in Ontario
