= Daniel Bédard =

Canadian musician and composer

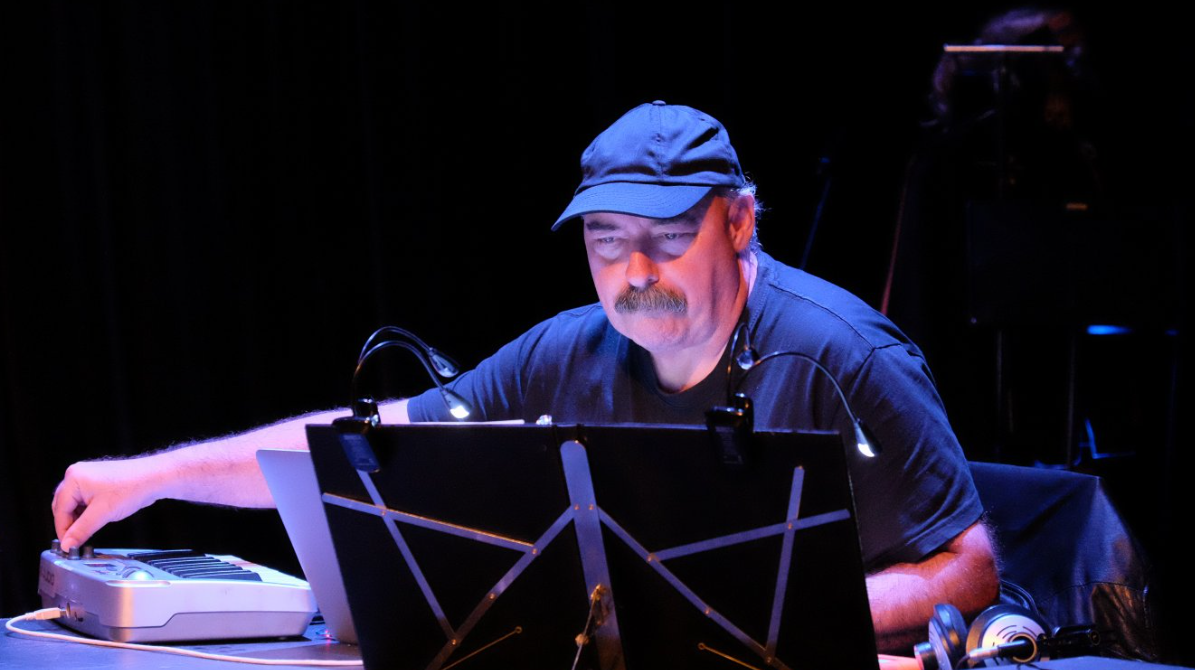
- Bédard in 2020
- Born: September 19, 1957 (age 68); Sudbury, Ontario, Canada
- Education: Laurentian University
- Occupations: Musician, composer, arranger, producer, audio engineer
- Website: https://soundsculpturessonores.com/

Daniel Bédard (born September 19, 1957) is a Canadian musician, composer, arranger, record producer, and audio engineer.

== Early years ==
Bédard grew up in Sudbury's Donovan neighbourhood in a musical family. When he was 14 years old, he began performing as a singer, guitarist and pianist with local groups. He attended Macdonald-Cartier high school, which had a thriving arts' program. He also has reminisced about formative influences while attending the music program at Cambrian College, collaborations with other musicians, and the Sudbury music scene.

== Career ==
Bédard has been described as a "juggler" who approaches each project with curiosity and rigour.

As a composer, Bédard has worked in several Canadian and American institutions. His most extensive multimedia collaboration has been with the production team at Science North in Sudbury. In theatre, his closest association has been with the Théâtre du Nouvel-Ontario, while in film he has worked with Next Phase Motion Pictures in Sudbury, among others.

As a performer, Bédard has appeared in groups and festivals such as Northern Lights Festival Boréal and La Nuit sur l'étang, including as music director. He has shared the stage and worked in various capacities, including as producer and sound engineer, on albums with Franco-Ontarian musicians such as Stef Paquette. Cage, an electroacoustic band named after composer John Cage, is headed by Bédard.

Bédard toured nationally with the troubadour Pierre Germain as musician and arranger for the children's album, Pierre et le Papillon. He also toured Chile and Argentina, and the province of Ontario with the Chilean-born singer-songwriter, Mauricio Montecinos.

He collaborated with the poets Robert Dickson, and Michel Dallaire, the photographer and poet Mary Green, and the visual artist Michel Galipeau.

The celebratory song, "Levons nos voix," was arranged and produced by Bédard for the 400th anniversary of the Francophone presence in Ontario. He also wrote the opening music for the 10th annual Franco-Ontarian Games.

A Laurentian University graduate, Bédard taught electronic music, composition and music theory at the university from 1988 to 2009.

== Awards ==
Bédard is the recipient of many honours including:

- Order of La Pléiade from the Ontario section of the Assemblée parlementaire de la Francophonie
- Outstanding Achievement Award, Sudbury Mayor's Annual Celebration of the Arts
- Prix Hommage from the Association des professionnels de la chanson et de la musique (APCM)
- Three-time winner of the APCM's Trille Or for best music score
- Three-time winner as a Science North production team member of Thea awards for multimedia installations from the Themed Entertainment Association
- Jackie Washington Award, Northern Lights Festival Boréal
- Golden Sheaf Award, Yorkton Film Festival, Yorkton, Saskatchewan

== Selected works ==
=== Multimedia installations ===
Soundscapes and audio design for:

- Wild Weather. 2016. Traveling exhibit. Canada/US sites, 2016-2021. Science North Productions. Cascade Award winner for Exhibit or Show - Large Institution, 2017.
- Creatures of the Abyss. 2012. Traveling exhibit. Hong Kong Science Center. Science North Productions. Trille Or award winner, Best Score, 2013.
- The Changing Climate Show. 2011. Object theatre. Science North, Sudbury. Trille Or award nominee, Best Score, 2013; Themed Entertainment Association (THEA) award winner, Outstanding Achievement: Limited Budget, 2012 (Award ceremony: Anaheim, California); Best Institutional Media Installation Award, Jackson Hole Science Media Awards, Jackson Hole, Wyoming, 2012.
- Otis’ Big Adventure. 2009. Object theatre. McNeil Avian Center, Philadelphia Zoo, Philadelphia. Trille Or award winner, Best Soundtrack, 2011; Thea award winner, 2010, Outstanding Achievement, Zoo Attraction: Limited Budget. Award ceremony: Universal Studios, Hollywood.
- Extinction Theater. 2006. Object theatre, Canadian Museum of Nature, Ottawa. Trille Or award winner, Best Score, 2007.
- Aztec on the River. 2006. Multimedia attraction and large-format theater pre-show. Aztec Theater, San Antonio, Texas. Thea Award winner, Outstanding Achievement – Attraction: Limited Budget, 2008. Award ceremony: Orlando, Florida.
- Exploring Chimpanzees: The Remarkable World of Jane Goodall. 2002. Traveling exhibit. Canada/US sites. 2002-2010. Science North Productions. Best Exhibit award winner, Canadian Association of Science Centres, 2003.

=== Theatre ===
Music and audio design for:

- Club des éphémères. 2020. Play by Alain Doom. Théâtre du Nouvel-Ontario and Théâtre français de Toronto.
- En grève autour de théières fumantes. 2019. Théâtre la catapulte and Théâtre action, Ottawa.
- Plein la gueule. 2019. Théâtre du Nouvel-Ontario, Sudbury.
- Geography of Fire. Play by Colleen Murphy. 2019. Sudbury Theatre Centre.
- Parmi les éclats. 2018. Théâtre du Nouvel-Ontario.
- Blind Nickel Pig. 2017. Play by Lara Bradley. Pat the Dog Theatre. Sudbury.
- BrokeDownTown. 2016. Crestfallen Theatre. Sudbury.
- Nowhere du Nord. 2013. Play by Miriam Cusson. Chelmsford, Ont. Musagetes.
- Fara Lifa: Fred et Crudo do Iceland. 2012. Productions Roches Brûlées.
- Sahel. 2010. Théâtre de la Vieille 17 - Ottawa. Prix Rideau nominee, Best Production of the Year, 2011.
- Univers. 2003. Play by Herménégilde Chiasson, Robert Marinier, and Dominick Parenteau-Lebeuf. Co-produced by Théâtre du Nouvel-Ontario, Sudbury, Théâtre de l'Escaouette, Moncton and Théâtre français du Centre National des Arts, Ottawa. Masque award winner, Best Franco-Canadian production, Soirée de Masque, 2003.
- Du pépin à la fissure. 2001. Play by Patrice Desbiens. Théâtre du Nouvel-Ontario, Sudbury. Masque award winner, Best Franco-Canadian Production, Soirée de Masque 2001; Critic's Choice nominee - Le Droit.
- Deuxième souffle. 1991. Play by Robert Marinier and Dan Lalonde. Co-produced by Théâtre du Nouvel-Ontario and Théâtre français du Centre National des Arts.
- Au pays de Ti-Jean. 1983. Théâtre du Nouvel-Ontario and Théâtre l'Acadie, Moncton, 1984.

=== Film ===
Music and audio design for:

- Fidelity. 2023. Next Phase Motion Pictures, Sudbury.
- Perspective. 2020. Next Phase Motion Pictures.
- Project Uncle. 2020. Sarah Gartshore, writer, director; Shkagamik-Kwe Health Centre, producer.
- The Standoff. 2011. Green Boots Films. Best Short Film award winner, Cinéfest Sudbury International Film Festival, 2011.
- Exploring the Weather: Reflections on Canadian Meteorology. 1990. Science North Productions. Golden Sheaf award winner, Best Documentary Film - Science and Technology Category, 1990, Yorkton Film Festival, Saskatchewan; Best Film - Science Category award winner, Casa de las Ciencias (La Coruña), Spain, 1990.

=== Radio, podcasts, television ===
Music, sound design and mix for:

- L'Insomnie, by Robert Marinier (2022) and Lucky Lady, by Jean-Marc Dalpé (2022). Podcasts. Idéllo.
- Cinéma de Mishka Lavigne. 2021. Podcast. Idéllo.
- Struck: A Pivot in Process. 2020. Podcast. By Eric Rose. Playsmelter.
- Solastalgia. 2020. Podcast. Play-in-process by Kristin Shepherd. Playsmelter.

=== Poetry, visual arts ===
Music and soundscapes for:

- El poder intimo. 1992. Exhibition. Collaboration with Michel Galipeau, Robert Dickson, and Sylvie Mainville. La Galerie du Nouvel-Ontario, Sudbury.
- La cuisine de la poésie présente: Robert Dickson. 1985. Édition Prise de Parole, Sudbury.

=== Electroacoustic works ===
For musicians, music gadgets, and soundtrack:

- En voie d'extinction. 1993. For choir and soundtrack. Premiered by the Sudbury Chamber Singers, Douglas Webb, conductor. A revised version was performed by the Vancouver Chamber Choir, Jon Washburn, conductor, Vancouver, November 3, 2000.

== Selected albums ==
- Le salut de l’arrière-pays. 2012. As producer, arranger, bass, acoustic guitar, mix engineer. Stef (Stéphane) Paquette, singer-songwriter. Acoustic Folk SP1110. Trille Or award winner, Best Album, 2013.
- L'homme exponentiel - les singles. 2003. As producer, arranger, bass, acoustic guitar, mix engineer. Stef Paquette, singer-songwriter. SP0703. Pop. Trille Or nominee, Best Album, 2005; Trille Or winner, Homme Exponentiel, Single of the Year, 2005.
- ¡Baila Conmigo! 2001. As arranger, bass, producer, programming and mix engineer. Backing vocals for "Yolanda" (track 3). Mauricio Montecinos, singer and guitarist. Global Art Beat Productions: GABP0401.
- le pays intime. 1999. Soundscape, music and audio engineer. Michel Dallaire, spoken poetry. Sudbury: Éditions prise de parole and Société Radio-Canada/CBON. Trille Or award winner, Best Poetry/Music Album, 2001.
- Echo. 1999. As producer, arranger, bass, acoustic guitar, mix engineer. Jacinthe Trudeau, fiddler. JT 0699. Fiddle/worldbeat. Best Instrumental Album nominee and Best Folk Album award winner, 2000 Canadian Aboriginal Music Awards; Trille Or award winner, Best Instrumental Album, 2001.
- Pierre et le Papillon. 1982. As arranger and multi-instrumentalist. Pierre Germain. MP 1085. Reissued in 2000 as Brindille chante Pierre et le Papillon, Trille Or award winner, Best Children's Album, 2001.
