= Anderson Farm Museum =

History museum in Sudbury, Ontario, Canada

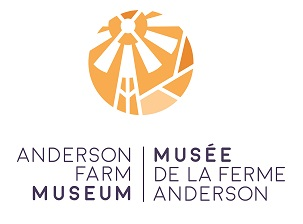

- Location of the museum in Ontario
- Location: 550 Regional Road 24, Lively, Greater Sudbury, Ontario, Canada
- Coordinates: 46.4322°N 81.1479°W
- Type: Heritage centre
- Public transit access: Cross & Phillip stop, Greater Sudbury Transit 701 Lively
- Website: Sudbury Museums mini-website

The Anderson Farm Museum is a local history museum, heritage centre, and event space in Lively, Greater Sudbury, Ontario, Canada. It is located on the site of the former Anderson family farm, a 14-acre (57,000 m^{2}), mostly-outdoor site containing the original farm buildings, artifacts from local history, as well as a heritage building from the former community of Creighton.

== History ==
=== Anderson Farm ===
The site history, which is the main topic of the museum, is primarily focused around the Anderson family, a typical Finnish pioneer family in the area. The main period the museum focuses on is the Anderson family's arrival in the area, the construction of their farm in the 1910s, through to the farm's growth and success as it became one of the largest dairy farming operations in the area.

Frans Viktor Anderson and Gretta Peltonen immigrated to Canada from Finland at the beginning of the 20th century and were married in Copper Cliff in 1901. This period marked the beginning of a high point in Finnish immigration to Canada, as many Finns fled economic stagnation, political persecution, and the suppression of their national identity under the Russian Empire. Finns were directed to, and chose to settle in, areas such as Northern Ontario, Manitoba, Michigan, and Minnesota due to the similarities in geography to much of Finland, and the fact that occupations which were common in the mostly agrarian and resource-based Finnish economy, such as agricultural labour, lumbering, and mining, were in high demand in these regions of North America.

Around this time, Sudbury was emerging as a significant industrial centre, and the creation of the Canadian Pacific Railway (CPR) and Algoma Eastern Railway (AER) significantly improved infrastructure and transportation in Northeastern Ontario, making them an ideal destination for settlers. A number of small company towns were being established along these railway lines, including Creighton in 1900, which was constructed along the AER line. These new populations of industrial workers and their families created a strong local food market for farmers, and the presence of the rail lines opened up the possibility of easy export of their products to urban centres like Sudbury. Many Finns began to create farms in the fertile area west of Sudbury, and formed communities such as Beaver Lake.

Frans Anderson (who began to go by "Frank") initially worked at the Creighton mine. The family's fortunes would steadily improve, as they had a number of children and moved to the Crean Hill mining community in 1906, where Frank worked as a shift boss and Gretta ran a boarding house. In 1910, they moved to Creighton and began to save money to build a farm. In 1914, they constructed their farmhouse, which is the centrepiece of the museum today. At the time it was considered to be living in Waters Township, as Lively did not exist.

In 1916, the main dairy barn was constructed, and by the early 1920s the farm's operations had significantly expanded. A sign of the family's increasing prosperity was the construction of a new kitchen, which was added onto the house in the mid-1920s. By the end of the 1930s, the farm's operations had largely come to an end, however, and Frank Anderson died in 1944.

=== Heritage activities ===
Conservation activities began to take place at the farm in the latter half of the 20th century, and in 1985 the site was known as the Anderson Farm Heritage Project. Around this time, the farm's iconic Beatty Brothers Limited Beatty Pumper Windmill, which features in its logo, was constructed out of parts from the farm's original three windmills, which powered its dairy operations.

In 1986, Inco announced that it was closing the town of Creighton, with a deadline in 1988 for residents to vacate the town. A number of homes in the area were relocated to other towns and areas of Greater Sudbury. Around this time, the historic log-built paymaster's cabin, which had functioned as a "company bank" early in Creighton's history, was relocated to the Anderson Farm site, and is still there today, with the museum interpreting aspects of Creighton and mining history alongside Waters Township's agricultural heritage.

In 1995, the Walden Art Club had a special exhibition by local artists at the Anderson Farm, with the farm itself as the artistic subject for many of the pieces.

The Walden Community Action Network's Heritage Committee was established in 2006, and brought a number of proposals to the Greater Sudbury city council regarding improvements and conservation work at the site. As a result, the Anderson Farm Museum Heritage Society (AFMHS) was incorporated in 2007.

== Status ==
The site is currently managed by Greater Sudbury Heritage Museums, a heritage and conservation body under the City of Greater Sudbury. It is open to the public within visiting hours. It is also the location of events organized by the Anderson Farm Museum Heritage Society, which hosts three recurring events at the site: the Rock the Farm Free Concert/Farmers' Market in July and August, a Fall Fair in September, and a Christmas tree lighting in December.
