= Maria Larsson (curler) =

Swedish curler

- Curler
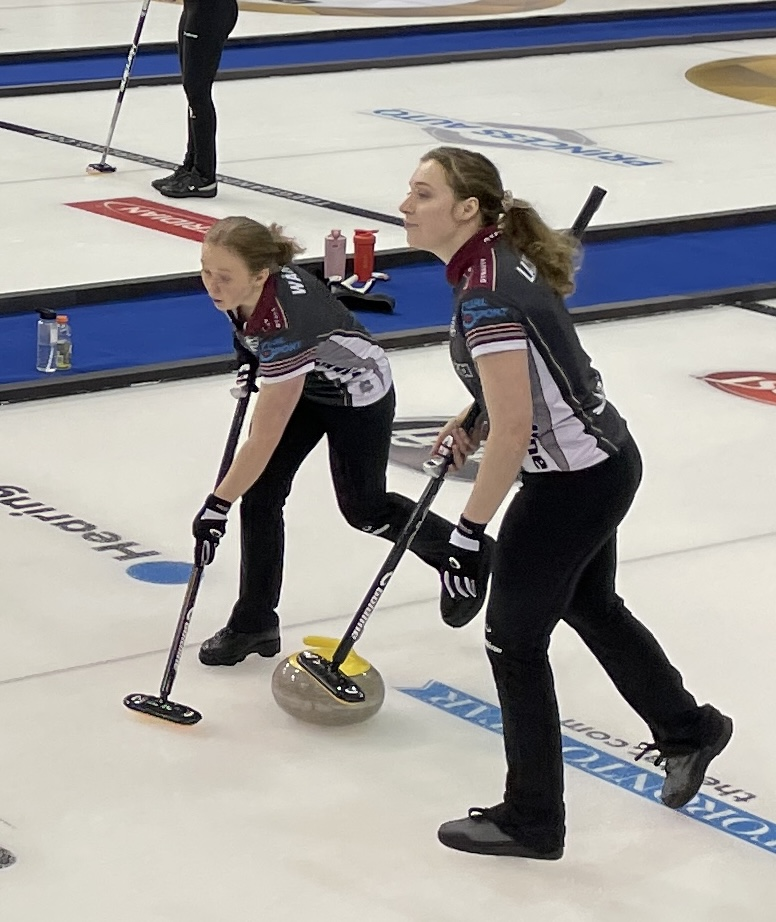
- Larsson (right) and Jennie Wåhlin at the 2022 Players' Championship
- Born: 14 June 2000 (age 26); Danderyd

Team
- Curling club: Sundbybergs CK, Sundbyberg, SWE
- Skip: Isabella Wranå
- Third: Almida de Val
- Second: Moa Dryburgh
- Lead: Maria Larsson
- Alternate: Linda Stenlund

Curling career
- Member Association: Sweden
- World Championship: 1 (2026)
- European Championship: 2 (2023, 2026)
- Grand Slam victories: 2 (2023 Players', 2026 Masters)
Medal record
Women's curling
Representing Sweden
World Championships
Bronze medal – third place	2026 Calgary
European Curling Championships
Gold medal – first place	2026 Ostrava
World Junior Curling Championships
Gold medal – first place	2017 Gangneung
Silver medal – second place	2018 Aberdeen
Swedish Women's Championships
Gold medal – first place	2022 Härnösand
Silver medal – second place	2023 Karlstad
Silver medal – second place	2024 Jönköping
Bronze medal – third place	2018 Skellefteå

Maria Larsson (born 14 June 2000) is a Swedish curler from Stockholm. She currently plays lead on Team Isabella Wranå. With this team, she won a gold medal at the 2017 World Junior Curling Championships and a silver medal at the 2018 World Junior Curling Championships.

== Career ==
Larsson qualified for her first World Junior Curling Championships in 2016, playing second on the Swedish team consisting of Therese Westman, Sarah Pengel, Mikaela Altebro and Johanna Heldin. At the 2016 World Junior Curling Championships, the team finished the round robin with a 5–4 record, qualifying for a tiebreaker. They then lost 10–4 in the tiebreaker to Hungary's Dorottya Palancsa, eliminating them from contention. At her next two appearances in 2017 and 2018, she was the alternate on Team Isabella Wranå. In 2017, the team made it all the way to the final and defeated Scotland's Sophie Jackson to win the gold medal, and lost just two round robin games in the process. The next year the same team went undefeated in the round robin, but ended up losing to Canada's Kaitlyn Jones in the final, settling for silver. At her fourth and final appearance in 2019 as lead for Tova Sundberg, the team placed sixth.

After the 2020–21 season lead of Team Wranå, Fanny Sjöberg, stepped back from competitive curling and Larsson replaced her as the team's new lead. The team had a successful first season together which started with reaching the final of the 2021 Euro Super Series in their first event. They also reached the semifinals of three more events, the 2021 Women's Masters Basel, the Red Deer Curling Classic and the International Bernese Ladies Cup. The team competed in three of the four Grand Slam of Curling events during the season, qualifying for the quarterfinals at both the 2021 National and the 2022 Players' Championship. Nationally, the team won the Swedish Eliteserien in February 2022 and later the Swedish Women's Curling Championship in March 2022. After the season, Jennie Wåhlin stepped back from competitive curling and was replaced by Linda Stenlund. The revised lineup of the team saw Wranå and de Val continue at skip and third while Larsson moved up to second and Stenlund slotted in at lead.

Team Wranå finished third at their second event of the 2022–23 season, the 2022 Oslo Cup, defeating Marianne Rørvik 6–2. In September, the team competed in the European Qualifier best-of-seven series against Team Hasselborg, which they lost 4–1. They then had a quarterfinal finish at the 2022 Women's Masters Basel after a previously unbeaten record. In the first Slam of the season, the 2022 National, they finished pool play with a 2–2 record, but then lost 7–2 in a tiebreaker to the newly formed Kaitlyn Lawes rink. At the 2022 Tour Challenge, they again went 2–2 to qualify for a tiebreaker, which they won 7–4 over Hollie Duncan. Team Wranå then beat the World Champion Silvana Tirinzoni rink in the quarters before losing to Team Rachel Homan in the semifinal, marking the first time the team qualified for a Slam semifinal. They then lost in the final of the Sundbyberg Open to Team Hasselborg. The next Slam was the 2022 Masters, where the team missed the playoffs with a 1–3 record. The team began the New Year at the 2023 Canadian Open, where they qualified through the A side, defeating Team Hasselborg in the A final game. In the playoffs, they defeated Jennifer Jones in the quarterfinals before losing to Kerri Einarson in the semifinals. Team Wranå's next event was the 2023 International Bernese Ladies Cup where they went undefeated until the final where they fell to Team Tirinzoni. The following month, they played in the Swedish Women's Curling Championship, finishing second behind Hasselborg. That same month, the team faced off against Hasselborg again for a chance to play in the 2023 World Women's Curling Championship. The two teams played in a best-of-seven series, with Hasselborg winning in seven games. In their next two events, they finished third at the Sun City Cup and won the Swedish Eliteserien. The team finished off their season at the 2023 Players' Championship. There, they finished 4–1 record in group play, earning a bye to the semifinals. In the playoffs, they defeated Einarson, and then Tirinzoni in the finals to claim the team's first ever Grand Slam title.

After suffering defeats to Team Hasselborg in both of their first two tour events, Team Wranå turned things around at the European qualifier as they won the series 4–2, earning them the right to represent Sweden at the 2023 European Curling Championships. In preparation for the Euros, the team played in the 2023 Players Open where they lost to Hasselborg in the final. They also played in two Slams, the 2023 Tour Challenge and the 2023 National, reaching the quarterfinals of the latter. In November, the team represented Sweden at the Europeans in Aberdeen. There, they finished third through the round robin with a 6–3 record, earning a spot in the playoffs. They then lost both the semifinal and bronze medal game to Italy and Norway respectively, finishing fourth. Back on tour, they reached the semifinals of the 2023 Western Showdown and the quarterfinals of the 2023 Masters and the 2024 International Bernese Ladies Cup. Days before the 2024 Swedish Women's Championship, Team Hasselborg was appointed to represent Sweden at the 2024 World Women's Curling Championship as they had accumulated more points than Team Wranå in their best five events. The team then lost the final of the Swedish Championship to Hasselborg. In February, Team Wranå won their sole event title of the season after an undefeated run at the Sun City Cup. To end the season, the team tried to defend their title at the 2024 Players' Championship. After a 4–1 record through the round robin, they beat Korea's Gim Eun-ji in the semifinal before coming up short to Silvana Tirinzoni in a rematch of the 2023 final.

To begin the 2024–25 season, Team Wranå lost the best-of-seven European qualifier to Team Hasselborg in four games. They also lost to Hasselborg in the quarterfinals of the 2024 Women's Masters Basel. On the Canadian tour, the team qualified for the semifinals at the 2024 Stu Sells Toronto Tankard and Saville Grand Prix and reached the quarterfinals at the 2024 Tour Challenge Slam. In December 2024, they won the WCT Take-Out Trophy, defeating Ikue Kitazawa in the final. In the new year, the team advanced to the semifinals of the 2025 Masters where they were again bested by Hasselborg. The following month, they defended their title at the Sun City Cup with an undefeated run. After Hasselborg was selected to represent Sweden at the 2025 World Women's Curling Championship, Team Wranå ended their season at the 2025 Players' Championship where after reaching the final in the previous two years, they finished with a 2–3 record.

In May 2025, Team Hasselborg was named as the Swedish Olympic team for the 2026 Winter Olympics and were also chosen for the 2025 European Curling Championships. Still chasing qualification points for the 2026 World Women's Curling Championship, Team Wranå began the season with a pair of semifinal finishes at the 2025 Stu Sells Oakville Tankard and 2025 Masters Slam. They also qualified for the quarterfinals at two other Slams, the 2025 Tour Challenge and 2026 Players' Championship, as well as the 2025 Canadian Open Tier 2. At the 2026 International Bernese Ladies Cup, Team Wranå lost in the final to Team Tirinzoni, however, with third Almida de Val skipping as Wranå was preparing for the mixed doubles competition at the Olympics. With their consistent playoff finishes throughout the season, the team earned enough points to surpass Hasselborg and qualify for the World Women's Championship, their first appearance at the event. There, the team finished fourth through the round robin with an 8–4 record. They then beat South Korea in the quarterfinals before dropping the semifinal to Switzerland. In the bronze medal game, the team won 8–5 over Japan's Satsuki Fujisawa to secure a podium finish.

Team Wranå started the 2026-27 curling season off strong, winning the 2026 Swedish European Qualifiers, winning the 2026 Karuizawa International Curling Championships, and a quarterfinal finish at the 2026 GSOC Invitational Slam. This success would continue into the 2026 European Curling Championships, where they would go undefeated and win their first European championship, beating Switzerland's Alina Pätz 7–2 in the final.

== Personal life ==
As of 2026, she was a student.

== Grand Slam record ==
Key
C	Champion
F	Lost in Final
SF	Lost in Semifinal
QF	Lost in Quarterfinals
R16	Lost in the round of 16
Q	Did not advance to playoffs
T2	Played in Tier 2 event
DNP	Did not participate in event
N/A	Not a Grand Slam event that season

Event	2021–22	2022–23	2023–24	2024–25	2025–26	2026–27
Invitational	N/A	SF	Q	QF	QF	QF
Masters	Q	Q	QF	SF	SF	C
National	QF	Q	QF	Q	Q	QF
Open	N/A	SF	Q	Q	T2	
Players'	QF	C	F	Q	QF	

== Teams ==
Season	Skip	Third	Second	Lead
2015–16	Therese Westman	Sarah Pengel	Maria Larsson	Mikaela Altebro
2016–17	Therese Westman	Tilde Vermelin	Maria Larsson	Mikaela Altebro
2017–18	Tova Sundberg	Emma Sjödin	Maria Larsson	Sofie Bergman
2018–19	Tova Sundberg	Emma Sjödin	Maria Larsson	Sofie Bergman
2019–20	Maria Larsson	Erika Jonsson	Sofie Bergman	Linda Stenlund
2020–21	Maria Larsson	Sofie Bergman	Vilma Åhlström	Linda Stenlund
2021–22	Isabella Wranå	Almida de Val	Jennie Wåhlin	Maria Larsson
2022–23	Isabella Wranå	Almida de Val	Maria Larsson	Linda Stenlund
2023–24	Isabella Wranå	Almida de Val	Maria Larsson	Linda Stenlund
2024–25	Isabella Wranå	Almida de Val	Maria Larsson	Linda Stenlund
2025–26	Isabella Wranå	Almida de Val	Maria Larsson	Linda Stenlund
2026–27	Isabella Wranå	Almida de Val	Moa Dryburgh	Maria Larsson
