= Linda Stenlund =

Swedish female curler (born 2000)

- Curler
- Born: 30 October 2000 (age 26); Östersund

Team
- Curling club: Östersunds CK, Östersund
- Skip: Isabella Wranå
- Third: Almida de Val
- Second: Moa Dryburgh
- Lead: Maria Larsson
- Alternate: Linda Stenlund

Curling career
- Member Association: Sweden
- World Championship: 1 (2026)
- European Championship: 2 (2023, 2026)
- World Junior Curling Championship: 1 (2022)
- Grand Slam victories: 1 (2023 Players')
Medal record
Women's curling
Representing Sweden
World Championships
Bronze medal – third place	2026 Calgary
European Curling Championships
Gold medal – first place	2026 Ostrava
World Junior Championships
Silver medal – second place	2022 Jönköping
Swedish Women's Curling Championships
Silver medal – second place	2023 Karlstad
Silver medal – second place	2024 Jönköping

Linda Stenlund (born 30 October 2000) is a Swedish curler from Uppsala. She was the lead, but is now the alternate on Team Isabella Wranå. In 2022, she won a silver medal at the 2022 World Junior Curling Championships as alternate for the Moa Dryburgh rink.

== Career ==
=== Junior ===
Stenlund competed under the Linnéa Svedberg and Maria Larsson rinks during her junior career, however, her teams were never able to win the Swedish Junior Curling Championships. In 2022, she joined the Moa Dryburgh rink with Thea Orefjord, Moa Tjärnlund and Moa Nilsson as their alternate for the 2022 World Junior Curling Championships. Through the round robin, the team posted a 5–4 record. This tied them for fourth with Switzerland and Latvia, however, due to their better draw shot challenge they advanced to the playoffs. In the semifinals, they upset the number one seeds Norway's Eirin Mesloe to advance to the gold medal game where they were defeated by Japan's Sae Yamamoto, settling for silver.

=== Women's ===
After the 2022–23 season second of Team Isabella Wranå, Jennie Wåhlin, stepped back from competitive curling and Stenlund replaced her on the team. She played lead while Maria Larsson played second, Almida de Val played third and Wranå continued to skip. Team Wranå finished third at their second event of the 2022–23 season, the 2022 Oslo Cup, defeating Marianne Rørvik 6–2. In September, the team competed in the European Qualifier best-of-seven series against Team Hasselborg, which they lost 4–1. They then had a quarterfinal finish at the 2022 Women's Masters Basel after a previously unbeaten record. In the first Slam of the season, the 2022 National, they finished pool play with a 2–2 record, but then lost 7–2 in a tiebreaker to the newly formed Kaitlyn Lawes rink. At the 2022 Tour Challenge, they again went 2–2 to qualify for a tiebreaker, which they won 7–4 over Hollie Duncan. Team Wranå then beat the World Champion Silvana Tirinzoni rink in the quarters before losing to Team Rachel Homan in the semifinal, marking the first time the team qualified for a Slam semifinal. They then lost in the final of the Sundbyberg Open to Team Hasselborg. The next Slam was the 2022 Masters, where the team missed the playoffs with a 1–3 record. The team began the New Year at the 2023 Canadian Open, where they qualified through the A side, defeating Team Hasselborg in the A final game. In the playoffs, they defeated Jennifer Jones in the quarterfinals before losing to Kerri Einarson in the semifinals. Team Wranå's next event was the 2023 International Bernese Ladies Cup where they went undefeated until the final where they fell to Team Tirinzoni. The following month, they played in the Swedish Women's Curling Championship, finishing second behind Hasselborg. That same month, the team faced off against Hasselborg again for a chance to play in the 2023 World Women's Curling Championship. The two teams played in a best-of-seven series, with Hasselborg winning in seven games. In their next two events, they finished third at the Sun City Cup and won the Swedish Eliteserien. The team finished off their season at the 2023 Players' Championship. There, they finished 4–1 record in group play, earning a bye to the semifinals. In the playoffs, they defeated Einarson, and then Tirinzoni in the finals to claim the team's first ever Grand Slam title.

After suffering defeats to Team Hasselborg in both of their first two tour events, Team Wranå turned things around at the European qualifier as they won the series 4–2, earning them the right to represent Sweden at the 2023 European Curling Championships. In preparation for the Euros, the team played in the 2023 Players Open where they lost to Hasselborg in the final. They also played in two Slams, the 2023 Tour Challenge and the 2023 National, reaching the quarterfinals of the latter. In November, the team represented Sweden at the Europeans in Aberdeen. There, they finished third through the round robin with a 6–3 record, earning a spot in the playoffs. They then lost both the semifinal and bronze medal game to Italy and Norway respectively, finishing fourth. Back on tour, they reached the semifinals of the 2023 Western Showdown and the quarterfinals of the 2023 Masters and the 2024 International Bernese Ladies Cup. Days before the 2024 Swedish Women's Championship, Team Hasselborg was appointed to represent Sweden at the 2024 World Women's Curling Championship as they had accumulated more points than Team Wranå in their best five events. The team then lost the final of the Swedish Championship to Hasselborg. In February, Team Wranå won their sole event title of the season after an undefeated run at the Sun City Cup. To end the season, the team tried to defend their title at the 2024 Players' Championship. After a 4–1 record through the round robin, they beat Korea's Gim Eun-ji in the semifinal before coming up short to Silvana Tirinzoni in a rematch of the 2023 final.

To begin the 2024–25 season, Team Wranå lost the best-of-seven European qualifier to Team Hasselborg in four games. They also lost to Hasselborg in the quarterfinals of the 2024 Women's Masters Basel. On the Canadian tour, the team qualified for the semifinals at the 2024 Stu Sells Toronto Tankard and Saville Grand Prix and reached the quarterfinals at the 2024 Tour Challenge Slam. In December 2024, they won the WCT Take-Out Trophy, defeating Ikue Kitazawa in the final. In the new year, the team advanced to the semifinals of the 2025 Masters where they were again bested by Hasselborg. The following month, they defended their title at the Sun City Cup with an undefeated run. After Hasselborg was selected to represent Sweden at the 2025 World Women's Curling Championship, Team Wranå ended their season at the 2025 Players' Championship where after reaching the final in the previous two years, they finished with a 2–3 record.

In May 2025, Team Hasselborg was named as the Swedish Olympic team for the 2026 Winter Olympics and were also chosen for the 2025 European Curling Championships. Still chasing qualification points for the 2026 World Women's Curling Championship, Team Wranå began the season with a pair of semifinal finishes at the 2025 Stu Sells Oakville Tankard and 2025 Masters Slam. They also qualified for the quarterfinals at two other Slams, the 2025 Tour Challenge and 2026 Players' Championship, as well as the 2025 Canadian Open Tier 2. At the 2026 International Bernese Ladies Cup, Team Wranå lost in the final to Team Tirinzoni, however, with third Almida de Val skipping as Wranå was preparing for the mixed doubles competition at the Olympics. With their consistent playoff finishes throughout the season, the team earned enough points to surpass Hasselborg and qualify for the World Women's Championship, their first appearance at the event. There, the team finished fourth through the round robin with an 8–4 record. They then beat South Korea in the quarterfinals before dropping the semifinal to Switzerland. In the bronze medal game, the team won 8–5 over Japan's Satsuki Fujisawa to secure a podium finish.

Team Wranå started the 2026-27 curling season off strong, winning the 2026 Swedish European Qualifiers, winning the 2026 Karuizawa International Curling Championships, and a quarterfinal finish at the 2026 GSOC Invitational Slam. This success would continue into the 2026 European Curling Championships, where they would go undefeated and win their first European championship, beating Switzerland's Alina Pätz 7–2 in the final.

=== Mixed ===
In 2019, Stenlund teamed up with Simon Olofsson, Vilma Åhlström and Axel Sjöberg to win the 2019 Swedish Mixed Curling Championship. This qualified the team for the 2019 World Mixed Curling Championship where they narrowly qualified for the playoffs with a 4–3 record. They then lost to Canada 9–4 in the round of 16.

== Personal life ==
Stenlund has also competed in alpine skiing for Östersund-Frösö Slalomklubb from 2007 to 2017. As of 2026, she was a nursing student.

== Teams ==
Season	Skip	Third	Second	Lead	Alternate
2015–16	Linnéa Svedberg	Linda Stenlund	Lisa Norrlander	Ellen Bromee	
2015–16	Lisa Norrlander	Vilma Åhlström	Linda Stenlund	Kajsa Olaisson	
2017–18	Lisa Norrlander	Vilma Åhlström	Linda Stenlund	Kajsa Olaisson	
2018–19	Maria Larsson	Erika Jonsson	Sofie Bergman	Linda Stenlund	
2019–20	Maria Larsson	Erika Jonsson	Sofie Bergman	Linda Stenlund	
2020–21	Maria Larsson	Sofie Bergman	Vilma Åhlström	Linda Stenlund	
2021–22	Moa Dryburgh	Thea Orefjord	Moa Tjärnlund	Moa Nilsson	Linda Stenlund
2022–23	Isabella Wranå	Almida de Val	Maria Larsson	Linda Stenlund	
2023–24	Isabella Wranå	Almida de Val	Maria Larsson	Linda Stenlund	
2024–25	Isabella Wranå	Almida de Val	Maria Larsson	Linda Stenlund	
2025–26	Isabella Wranå	Almida de Val	Maria Larsson	Linda Stenlund	
2026–27	Isabella Wranå	Almida de Val	Moa Dryburgh	Maria Larsson	Linda Stenlund
