= Moa Dryburgh =

Swedish curler (born 2005)

- Curler
- Born: May 29, 2005 (age 21); Stockholm, Sweden

Team
- Curling club: Sundbybergs CK, Sundbyberg, SWE
- Skip: Isabella Wranå
- Third: Almida de Val
- Second: Moa Dryburgh
- Lead: Maria Larsson
- Alternate: Linda Stenlund

Curling career
- Member Association: Sweden
- World Championship: 1 (2026)
- European Championship: 1 (2026)
- World Junior Curling Championship: 5 (2022, 2023, 2024, 2025, 2026)
- World Junior Mixed Doubles Curling Championship: 2 (2025, 2026)
- Grand Slam victories: 1 (2026 Masters)
Medal record
Women's curling
Representing Sweden
World Championships
Bronze medal – third place	2026 Calgary
European Curling Championships
Gold medal – first place	2026 Ostrava
World Junior Championships
Silver medal – second place	2022 Jönköping
Silver medal – second place	2026 Tårnby
Swedish Women's Championship
Bronze medal – third place	2023 Karlstad

Moa McGregor Dryburgh (born May 29, 2005, in Stockholm) is a Swedish curler from Sundbyberg. She currently plays second on Team Isabella Wranå. In 2022, she skipped her team to a silver medal at the 2022 World Junior Curling Championships at 16 years old, becoming one of the youngest skips to reach the podium at the World Junior Championships.

== Career ==
=== Juniors ===
During the 2021–22 season, Dryburgh led her team to victory at the Swedish Junior Curling Championships, going undefeated to claim the title. This qualified her and teammates Thea Orefjord, Moa Tjärnlund and Moa Nilsson for the 2022 World Junior Curling Championships in Jönköping. As the home team, the rink had mixed results, sitting at 3–4 with two round robin games to go. They then, however, defeated both Scotland and South Korea to finish at 5–4, just enough to earn the fourth playoff spot over Switzerland and Latvia who shared the same record. In the knockout round, the team upset the number one seeds Norway in the semifinals, advancing to the final in their first international competition. There, they lost 7–4 to Japan, settling for the silver medal. Despite the loss, Dryburgh became one of the youngest skips to reach the podium at the World Junior Championships.

The Dryburgh rink would go on to defend their title at the Swedish Junior Championships, qualifying for the 2023 World Junior Curling Championships, this year in Füssen, Germany. At Worlds, the team had similar results as the previous year, going 5–4 in the round robin. This was, however, not enough to qualify for the playoffs as they finished in fifth place. Dryburgh and her team again defended her Swedish Junior Women's title and returned to the World Juniors at the 2024 World Junior Curling Championships. There, the team started with three straight losses before finishing the round robin by winning five of their last six games. This put them in a three-way tie for third, however, due to head-to-head losses to both Norway and Canada, they were again eliminated in fifth place.

Dryburgh and her team represented Sweden at the 2025 Winter World University Games. The team would finish in 6th place, finishing the round robin with a 4–5 record. The Dryburgh rink would win their 4th consecutive Swedish Junior women's title and represent Sweden again at the 2025 World Junior Curling Championships. At the 2025 World Juniors, the team finally returned to the playoffs, but would go on to finish in fourth place, losing to Canada's Allyson MacNutt 7–4 in the bronze medal game. In her final year of Junior eligibility, Dryburgh and her team would win their 5th consecutive Swedish Junior title, and again represent Sweden at the 2026 World Junior Curling Championships. At her final World Juniors, Dryburgh would finish the round robin in second place with a 7–2 record, qualifying again for the playoffs. They would defeat China in the semifinals before losing the final to Korea's Kang Bo-bae 14–7, earning her second World Junior Silver medal.

=== Women's ===
Team Dryburgh began competing on the Women's World Curling Tour during the 2022-23 curling season. In January 2023, the team advanced to the semifinals of the 2023 Mercure Perth Masters before losing to Daniela Jentsch. Also during the season, they earned a bronze medal at the Swedish Women's Curling Championship. To begin the 2023–24 season, Team Dryburgh reached the quarterfinals of the 2023 Oslo Cup. They also made the playoffs in their next three events, finishing as high as third place at the Sundbyberg Open. In the new year, the team won their third straight Swedish Junior title, once again finishing undefeated through the event. Dryburgh's rink also played in the 2024 International Bernese Ladies Cup where they made the quarterfinals.

Dryburgh was selected to represent Sweden as the alternate on Isabella Wranå's team at the 2026 World Women's Curling Championship, where Sweden would win the bronze medal, beating Japan's Satsuki Fujisawa 8–5 in the bronze medal game. At the end of the 2025–26 curling season, Team Wranå would announce that Dryburgh would be joining the team next season as their new lead, alongside Wranå, Almida de Val, Maria Larsson, and Linda Stenlund. Team Wranå started the 2026-27 curling season off strong, winning the 2026 Swedish European Qualifiers, winning the 2026 Karuizawa International Curling Championships, and a quarterfinal finish at the 2026 GSOC Invitational Slam. This success would continue into the 2026 European Curling Championships, where they would go undefeated and win their first European championship, beating Switzerland's Alina Pätz 7–2 in the final.

=== Mixed doubles ===
Drybrugh would represent Sweden alongside teammate Vilmer Nygren at the inaugural 2025 World Junior Mixed Doubles Curling Championship. There, they would finish round robin as the 7th ranked team, qualifying for the playoffs. After beating Scotland in the quarterfinals, they would lose to Denmark 9–8 in the semifinals and Korea 6–5 in the bronze medal game, settling for 4th place. Dryburgh and Nygren would return to represent Sweden again at the 2026 World Junior Mixed Doubles Curling Championship, however this time after the round robin they would just barely miss the playoffs, finishing 3rd in their pool with a 4–2 record and overall in 9th place.

== Personal life ==
Dryburgh comes from a curling family. Her parents Margaretha and James Dryburgh met while competing at the 1998 Winter Olympics. Her mother went on to win a bronze medal from the event and also won two World Women's Championships and one European title. Her father also won a European title along with two World Junior Championships. Dryburgh attended the Swedish School of Sport and Health Sciences. She is employed as a grocery store employee and substitute teacher.

== Teams ==
Season	Skip	Third	Second	Lead	Alternate
2021–22	Moa Dryburgh	Thea Orefjord	Moa Tjärnlund	Moa Nilsson	Linda Stenlund
2022–23	Moa Dryburgh	Thea Orefjord	Moa Tjärnlund	Moa Nilsson	Erika Ryberg
2023–24	Moa Dryburgh	Thea Orefjord	Moa Tjärnlund	Moa Nilsson	
2024–25	Moa Dryburgh	Thea Orefjord	Moa Tjärnlund	Moa Nilsson	Maja Roxin
2025–26	Moa Dryburgh	Moa Tjärnlund	Thea Orefjord	Maja Roxin	Erika Ryberg
2026–27	Isabella Wranå	Almida de Val	Moa Dryburgh	Maria Larsson	Linda Stenlund
