= Sun City Cup =

Annual curling tournament in Karlstad, Sweden

- Established: 2023
- Host city: Karlstad, Sweden
- Arena: Karlstads Curlingklubb
- Men's purse: kr 55,000
- Women's purse: kr 55,000

Current champions (2026)
- Men: (Italy) Stefano Spiller
- Women: (Denmark) Madeleine Dupont

The Sun City Cup is an annual curling tournament, held in February in Karlstad, Sweden. It is the final event of the season on the Nordic Curling Tour, attracting many top teams from across Europe and Asia. It was established in 2023.

The inaugural event was won by the hometown Niklas Edin rink on the men's side, who defeated the Netherlands' Wouter Gösgens 5–2 in the championship game. Norway's Marianne Rørvik took the women's title with a 4–3 extra end victory over Sundbyberg's Anna Hasselborg.

In 2024, Gösgens's Dutch rink claimed the title with an undefeated record, doubling up on Cameron Bryce of Scotland 10–5 in the final. On the women's side, Sweden won again, with Isabella Wranå and her team from Sundbyberg defeating Japan's Satsuki Fujisawa 6–5.

Wranå's Swedish side repeated as champions in 2025, taking down reigning world junior champion Xenia Schwaller of Switzerland 7–4. Scotland's James Craik was victorious in the men's event, beating Switzerland's Jan Iseli 6–5.

== Past champions ==
=== Men ===
Year	Winning team	Runner up team	Purse (kr)
2023	(Sweden) Niklas Edin, Oskar Eriksson, Rasmus Wranå, Christoffer Sundgren	(Netherlands) Wouter Gösgens, Jaap van Dorp, Laurens Hoekman, Tobias van den Hurk	55,000
2024	(Netherlands) Wouter Gösgens, Laurens Hoekman, Jaap van Dorp, Tobias van den Hurk	(Scotland) Cameron Bryce, Duncan Menzies, Luke Carson, Robin McCall	55,000
2025	(Scotland) James Craik, Mark Watt, Angus Bryce, Blair Haswell	(Switzerland) Marco Hefti (Fourth), Jan Iseli (Skip), Max Winz, Sandro Fanchini	55,000
2026	(Italy) Stefano Spiller, Stefano Gilli, Andrea Gilli, Cesare Spiller	(Japan) Takumi Maeda, Hiroki Maeda, Uryu Kamikawa, Gakuto Tokoro	55,000

=== Women ===
Year	Winning team	Runner up team	Purse (kr)
2023	(Norway) Kristin Skaslien (Fourth), Marianne Rørvik (Skip), Mille Haslev Nordbye, Martine Rønning	(Sweden) Anna Hasselborg, Sara McManus, Agnes Knochenhauer, Sofia Mabergs	55,000
2024	(Sweden) Isabella Wranå, Almida de Val, Maria Larsson, Linda Stenlund	(Japan) Satsuki Fujisawa, Chinami Yoshida, Yumi Suzuki, Yurika Yoshida	55,000
2025	(Sweden) Isabella Wranå, Almida de Val, Maria Larsson, Linda Stenlund	(Switzerland) Xenia Schwaller, Selina Gafner, Fabienne Rieder, Selina Rychiger	55,000
2026	(Denmark) Madeleine Dupont, Mathilde Halse, Jasmin Holtermann, Denise Dupont, My Larsen	(Japan) Satsuki Fujisawa, Chinami Yoshida, Yumi Suzuki, Yurika Yoshida	55,000
