= 2026 World Junior Curling Championships =

- Host city: Tårnby, Denmark
- Arena: Tårnby Curling Club
- Dates: February 24 – March 3
- Men's winner: United States
- Curling club: Eau Claire CC, Eau Claire
- Skip: Caden Hebert
- Third: Jackson Bestland
- Second: Benji Paral
- Lead: Jack Wendtland
- Alternate: Daniel Laufer
- Finalist: Italy (Spiller)
- Women's winner: South Korea
- Curling club: Jeonbuk CC, Jeonbuk
- Skip: Kang Bo-bae
- Third: Shim Yu-jeong
- Second: Lee Bo-young
- Lead: Lee You-sun
- Alternate: Park Yea-lynn
- Coach: Kwon Young-il
- Finalist: Sweden (Dryburgh)

The 2026 World Junior Curling Championships were held from February 24 to March 3 at the Tårnby Curling Club in Tårnby, Denmark.

This was the second time Tårnby hosted the World Junior Curling Championships. The first was in 2016 when Scotland's Bruce Mouat and Canada's Mary Fay took home the titles.

== Medallists ==
| Junior | Gold | Silver | Bronze |
|---|---|---|---|
| Men | United States; Caden Hebert; Jackson Bestland; Benji Paral; Jack Wendtland; Daniel Laufer | Italy; Stefano Spiller; Stefano Gilli; Andrea Gilli; Cesare Spiller; Francesco Vigliani | Scotland; Orrin Carson; Logan Carson; Archie Hyslop; Charlie Gibb; Fraser Swanston |
| Women | South Korea; Kang Bo-bae; Shim Yu-jeong; Lee Bo-young; Lee You-sun; Park Yea-lynn | Sweden; Moa Dryburgh; Moa Tjärnlund; Thea Orefjord; Maja Roxin; Erika Ryberg | China; Wang Zhuoyi; Mu Jiayin; Chen Zaoxue; Dong Shihan; Liu Chenxi |

== Men ==
=== Qualification ===
The following nations qualified to participate in the 2026 World Junior Curling Championship:

| Event | Vacancies | Qualified |
|---|---|---|
| Host Nation | 1 | Denmark |
| 2025 World Junior Curling Championships | 6 | Italy; Norway; Scotland; South Korea; Japan; Canada |
| 2025 World Junior-B Curling Championships | 3 | United States; Switzerland; Poland |
| TOTAL | 10 | |

=== Teams ===
The teams are listed as follows:

| Canada | Denmark | Italy | Japan | Norway |
|---|---|---|---|---|
| Skip: Calan MacIsaac; Third: Nathan Gray; Second: Owain Fisher; Lead: Christopher McCurdy; Alternate: Nicholas Mosher | Fourth: Jonathan Vilandt; Skip: Jacob Schmidt; Second: Alexander Qvist; Lead: Kasper Jurlander Bøge; Alternate: Nikki Jensen | Skip: Stefano Spiller; Third: Stefano Gilli; Second: Andrea Gilli; Lead: Cesare Spiller; Alternate: Francesco Vigliani | Skip: Chikara Segawa; Third: Hinata Michitani; Second: Kaishi Sato; Lead: Haruta Imamoto; Alternate: Kota Imamoto | Skip: Markus Dale; Third: Emil Storli; Second: Anders Mjøen; Lead: Erland Snøve; Alternate: Jonathan Sæteren |
| Poland | Scotland | South Korea | Switzerland | United States |
| Skip: Szymon Rokita; Third: Antoni Frynia; Second: Arkadiusz Frysz; Lead: Kamil Rokita | Skip: Orrin Carson; Third: Logan Carson; Second: Archie Hyslop; Lead: Charlie Gibb; Alternate: Fraser Swanston | Skip: Park Seong-min; Third: Seol Dong-suk; Second: Kwon Jun-i; Lead: Kim Hong-geon; Alternate: Kim Dae-hyun | Skip: Felix Lüthold; Third: Leon Wittich; Second: Livio Ernst; Lead: Jonas Feierabend; Alternate: Nils Freimann | Skip: Caden Hebert; Third: Jackson Bestland; Second: Benji Paral; Lead: Jack Wendtland; Alternate: Daniel Laufer |

=== Round robin standings ===
Final Round Robin Standings

Key
| Teams to Playoffs |

| Country | Skip | W | L | W–L | PF | PA | EW | EL | BE | SE | DSC |
|---|---|---|---|---|---|---|---|---|---|---|---|
| Scotland | Orrin Carson | 8 | 1 | 1–0 | 80 | 39 | 40 | 28 | 4 | 11 | 25.11 |
| United States | Caden Hebert | 8 | 1 | 0–1 | 66 | 37 | 44 | 29 | 4 | 14 | 27.31 |
| Canada | Calan MacIsaac | 7 | 2 | – | 66 | 48 | 43 | 33 | 6 | 11 | 40.89 |
| Italy | Stefano Spiller | 6 | 3 | – | 68 | 49 | 37 | 31 | 7 | 7 | 32.33 |
| Switzerland | Felix Lüthold | 5 | 4 | – | 54 | 55 | 32 | 39 | 6 | 5 | 35.39 |
| Norway | Markus Dale | 3 | 6 | 1–1 | 47 | 67 | 33 | 36 | 5 | 8 | 19.21 |
| Denmark | Jacob Schmidt | 3 | 6 | 1–1 | 52 | 57 | 34 | 33 | 5 | 10 | 28.44 |
| Japan | Chikara Segawa | 3 | 6 | 1–1 | 43 | 65 | 29 | 39 | 3 | 8 | 45.72 |
| South Korea | Park Seong-min | 2 | 7 | – | 40 | 68 | 29 | 40 | 6 | 6 | 78.80 |
| Poland | Szymon Rokita | 0 | 9 | – | 44 | 75 | 30 | 43 | 3 | 8 | 45.54 |

Round robin summary table
| Pos. | Country | Canada | Denmark | Italy | Japan | Norway | Poland | Scotland | South Korea | Switzerland | United States | Record |
|---|---|---|---|---|---|---|---|---|---|---|---|---|
| 3 | Canada | — | 8–7 | 8–9 | 5–4 | 9–3 | 8–6 | 6–4 | 8–7 | 9–1 | 5–7 | 7–2 |
| 7 | Denmark | 7–8 | — | 5–6 | 9–4 | 5–9 | 9–1 | 1–10 | 8–3 | 3–9 | 5–7 | 3–6 |
| 4 | Italy | 9–8 | 6–5 | — | 9–1 | 10–4 | 7–4 | 9–11 | 8–3 | 6–8 | 4–5 | 6–3 |
| 8 | Japan | 4–5 | 4–9 | 1–9 | — | 7–0 | 8–7 | 2–11 | 5–7 | 9–7 | 3–10 | 3–6 |
| 6 | Norway | 3–9 | 9–5 | 4–10 | 0–7 | — | 10–8 | 3–9 | 8–4 | 4–7 | 6–8 | 3–6 |
| 10 | Poland | 6–8 | 1–9 | 4–7 | 7–8 | 8–10 | — | 5–11 | 6–7 | 5–6 | 2–9 | 0–9 |
| 1 | Scotland | 4–6 | 10–1 | 11–9 | 11–2 | 9–3 | 11–5 | — | 10–5 | 7–3 | 7–5 | 8–1 |
| 9 | South Korea | 7–8 | 3–8 | 3–8 | 7–5 | 4–8 | 7–6 | 5–10 | — | 3–9 | 1–6 | 2–7 |
| 5 | Switzerland | 1–9 | 9–3 | 8–6 | 7–9 | 7–4 | 6–5 | 3–7 | 9–3 | — | 4–9 | 5–4 |
| 2 | United States | 7–5 | 7–5 | 5–4 | 10–3 | 8–6 | 9–2 | 5–7 | 6–1 | 9–4 | — | 8–1 |

=== Round robin results ===
All draw times are listed in Central European Time (UTC+01:00).

==== Draw 1 ====
Tuesday, February 24, 14:00

| Sheet A | 1 | 2 | 3 | 4 | 5 | 6 | 7 | 8 | 9 | 10 | Final |
|---|---|---|---|---|---|---|---|---|---|---|---|
| United States (Hebert) 🔨 | 1 | 1 | 2 | 0 | 2 | 2 | 0 | 1 | 0 | X | 9 |
| Switzerland (Lüthold) | 0 | 0 | 0 | 1 | 0 | 0 | 1 | 0 | 2 | X | 4 |

| Sheet B | 1 | 2 | 3 | 4 | 5 | 6 | 7 | 8 | 9 | 10 | Final |
|---|---|---|---|---|---|---|---|---|---|---|---|
| Denmark (Schmidt) | 0 | 0 | 1 | 0 | 0 | 2 | 0 | 1 | 1 | 0 | 5 |
| Italy (Spiller) 🔨 | 0 | 2 | 0 | 1 | 0 | 0 | 2 | 0 | 0 | 1 | 6 |

| Sheet C | 1 | 2 | 3 | 4 | 5 | 6 | 7 | 8 | 9 | 10 | Final |
|---|---|---|---|---|---|---|---|---|---|---|---|
| Canada (MacIsaac) 🔨 | 0 | 0 | 1 | 1 | 0 | 1 | 0 | 1 | 0 | 1 | 5 |
| Japan (Segawa) | 0 | 0 | 0 | 0 | 2 | 0 | 1 | 0 | 1 | 0 | 4 |

| Sheet D | 1 | 2 | 3 | 4 | 5 | 6 | 7 | 8 | 9 | 10 | Final |
|---|---|---|---|---|---|---|---|---|---|---|---|
| Poland (Rokita) 🔨 | 2 | 0 | 0 | 1 | 0 | 1 | 1 | 0 | 0 | X | 5 |
| Scotland (Carson) | 0 | 2 | 1 | 0 | 2 | 0 | 0 | 2 | 4 | X | 11 |

| Sheet E | 1 | 2 | 3 | 4 | 5 | 6 | 7 | 8 | 9 | 10 | Final |
|---|---|---|---|---|---|---|---|---|---|---|---|
| Norway (Dale) 🔨 | 1 | 0 | 0 | 1 | 0 | 3 | 1 | 0 | 2 | X | 8 |
| South Korea (Park) | 0 | 0 | 2 | 0 | 1 | 0 | 0 | 1 | 0 | X | 4 |

==== Draw 2 ====
Wednesday, February 25, 9:00

| Sheet A | 1 | 2 | 3 | 4 | 5 | 6 | 7 | 8 | 9 | 10 | Final |
|---|---|---|---|---|---|---|---|---|---|---|---|
| Italy (Spiller) 🔨 | 0 | 0 | 0 | 2 | 0 | 3 | 0 | 1 | 1 | X | 7 |
| Poland (Rokita) | 0 | 0 | 0 | 0 | 1 | 0 | 3 | 0 | 0 | X | 4 |

| Sheet B | 1 | 2 | 3 | 4 | 5 | 6 | 7 | 8 | 9 | 10 | Final |
|---|---|---|---|---|---|---|---|---|---|---|---|
| Switzerland (Lüthold) | 0 | 0 | 0 | 1 | 0 | 1 | 0 | 1 | 0 | 0 | 3 |
| Scotland (Carson) 🔨 | 0 | 1 | 1 | 0 | 1 | 0 | 2 | 0 | 1 | 1 | 7 |

| Sheet C | 1 | 2 | 3 | 4 | 5 | 6 | 7 | 8 | 9 | 10 | Final |
|---|---|---|---|---|---|---|---|---|---|---|---|
| Norway (Dale) | 0 | 2 | 0 | 2 | 0 | 0 | 1 | 1 | 0 | 0 | 6 |
| United States (Hebert) 🔨 | 2 | 0 | 1 | 0 | 1 | 0 | 0 | 0 | 2 | 2 | 8 |

| Sheet D | 1 | 2 | 3 | 4 | 5 | 6 | 7 | 8 | 9 | 10 | Final |
|---|---|---|---|---|---|---|---|---|---|---|---|
| South Korea (Park) 🔨 | 2 | 0 | 0 | 1 | 0 | 1 | 1 | 1 | 0 | 1 | 7 |
| Japan (Segawa) | 0 | 0 | 4 | 0 | 0 | 0 | 0 | 0 | 1 | 0 | 5 |

| Sheet E | 1 | 2 | 3 | 4 | 5 | 6 | 7 | 8 | 9 | 10 | Final |
|---|---|---|---|---|---|---|---|---|---|---|---|
| Denmark (Schmidt) | 0 | 0 | 1 | 0 | 1 | 0 | 2 | 0 | 3 | 0 | 7 |
| Canada (MacIsaac) 🔨 | 1 | 1 | 0 | 1 | 0 | 2 | 0 | 1 | 0 | 2 | 8 |

==== Draw 3 ====
Wednesday, February 25, 19:00

| Sheet A | 1 | 2 | 3 | 4 | 5 | 6 | 7 | 8 | 9 | 10 | Final |
|---|---|---|---|---|---|---|---|---|---|---|---|
| Japan (Segawa) | 0 | 0 | 1 | 1 | 0 | 1 | 1 | 0 | 0 | X | 4 |
| Denmark (Schmidt) 🔨 | 4 | 1 | 0 | 0 | 1 | 0 | 0 | 2 | 1 | X | 9 |

| Sheet B | 1 | 2 | 3 | 4 | 5 | 6 | 7 | 8 | 9 | 10 | Final |
|---|---|---|---|---|---|---|---|---|---|---|---|
| United States (Hebert) 🔨 | 3 | 0 | 0 | 1 | 1 | 0 | 0 | 1 | X | X | 6 |
| South Korea (Park) | 0 | 0 | 1 | 0 | 0 | 0 | 0 | 0 | X | X | 1 |

| Sheet C | 1 | 2 | 3 | 4 | 5 | 6 | 7 | 8 | 9 | 10 | Final |
|---|---|---|---|---|---|---|---|---|---|---|---|
| Switzerland (Lüthold) 🔨 | 0 | 1 | 0 | 0 | 1 | 0 | 0 | 3 | 0 | 1 | 6 |
| Poland (Rokita) | 0 | 0 | 1 | 1 | 0 | 2 | 0 | 0 | 1 | 0 | 5 |

| Sheet D | 1 | 2 | 3 | 4 | 5 | 6 | 7 | 8 | 9 | 10 | Final |
|---|---|---|---|---|---|---|---|---|---|---|---|
| Canada (MacIsaac) | 0 | 3 | 0 | 1 | 0 | 1 | 0 | 4 | X | X | 9 |
| Norway (Dale) 🔨 | 1 | 0 | 1 | 0 | 0 | 0 | 1 | 0 | X | X | 3 |

| Sheet E | 1 | 2 | 3 | 4 | 5 | 6 | 7 | 8 | 9 | 10 | Final |
|---|---|---|---|---|---|---|---|---|---|---|---|
| Italy (Spiller) | 0 | 2 | 0 | 3 | 0 | 0 | 3 | 0 | 1 | 0 | 9 |
| Scotland (Carson) 🔨 | 1 | 0 | 2 | 0 | 2 | 0 | 0 | 4 | 0 | 2 | 11 |

==== Draw 4 ====
Thursday, February 26, 14:00

| Sheet A | 1 | 2 | 3 | 4 | 5 | 6 | 7 | 8 | 9 | 10 | Final |
|---|---|---|---|---|---|---|---|---|---|---|---|
| Scotland (Carson) | 0 | 2 | 1 | 0 | 4 | 0 | 2 | X | X | X | 9 |
| Norway (Dale) 🔨 | 1 | 0 | 0 | 1 | 0 | 1 | 0 | X | X | X | 3 |

| Sheet B | 1 | 2 | 3 | 4 | 5 | 6 | 7 | 8 | 9 | 10 | 11 | Final |
|---|---|---|---|---|---|---|---|---|---|---|---|---|
| Canada (MacIsaac) | 0 | 1 | 1 | 0 | 0 | 2 | 0 | 0 | 2 | 0 | 2 | 8 |
| Poland (Rokita) 🔨 | 0 | 0 | 0 | 1 | 1 | 0 | 0 | 1 | 0 | 3 | 0 | 6 |

| Sheet C | 1 | 2 | 3 | 4 | 5 | 6 | 7 | 8 | 9 | 10 | Final |
|---|---|---|---|---|---|---|---|---|---|---|---|
| South Korea (Park) 🔨 | 1 | 0 | 1 | 0 | 1 | 0 | 0 | X | X | X | 3 |
| Italy (Spiller) | 0 | 2 | 0 | 2 | 0 | 3 | 1 | X | X | X | 8 |

| Sheet D | 1 | 2 | 3 | 4 | 5 | 6 | 7 | 8 | 9 | 10 | Final |
|---|---|---|---|---|---|---|---|---|---|---|---|
| Japan (Segawa) | 0 | 0 | 1 | 0 | 1 | 0 | 1 | 0 | 0 | X | 3 |
| United States (Hebert) 🔨 | 3 | 1 | 0 | 1 | 0 | 1 | 0 | 1 | 3 | X | 10 |

| Sheet E | 1 | 2 | 3 | 4 | 5 | 6 | 7 | 8 | 9 | 10 | Final |
|---|---|---|---|---|---|---|---|---|---|---|---|
| Switzerland (Lüthold) 🔨 | 2 | 0 | 0 | 0 | 0 | 3 | 1 | 0 | 3 | X | 9 |
| Denmark (Schmidt) | 0 | 0 | 1 | 0 | 1 | 0 | 0 | 1 | 0 | X | 3 |

==== Draw 5 ====
Friday, February 27, 9:00

| Sheet A | 1 | 2 | 3 | 4 | 5 | 6 | 7 | 8 | 9 | 10 | Final |
|---|---|---|---|---|---|---|---|---|---|---|---|
| Canada (MacIsaac) 🔨 | 1 | 0 | 0 | 2 | 0 | 0 | 2 | 0 | 3 | 0 | 8 |
| Italy (Spiller) | 0 | 3 | 1 | 0 | 2 | 1 | 0 | 1 | 0 | 1 | 9 |

| Sheet B | 1 | 2 | 3 | 4 | 5 | 6 | 7 | 8 | 9 | 10 | Final |
|---|---|---|---|---|---|---|---|---|---|---|---|
| Norway (Dale) | 0 | 0 | 1 | 1 | 1 | 0 | 0 | 1 | 0 | X | 4 |
| Switzerland (Lüthold) 🔨 | 0 | 2 | 0 | 0 | 0 | 2 | 2 | 0 | 1 | X | 7 |

| Sheet C | 1 | 2 | 3 | 4 | 5 | 6 | 7 | 8 | 9 | 10 | Final |
|---|---|---|---|---|---|---|---|---|---|---|---|
| United States (Hebert) 🔨 | 1 | 0 | 0 | 2 | 0 | 0 | 0 | 1 | 0 | 1 | 5 |
| Scotland (Carson) | 0 | 0 | 2 | 0 | 1 | 2 | 1 | 0 | 1 | 0 | 7 |

| Sheet D | 1 | 2 | 3 | 4 | 5 | 6 | 7 | 8 | 9 | 10 | Final |
|---|---|---|---|---|---|---|---|---|---|---|---|
| Denmark (Schmidt) 🔨 | 1 | 2 | 0 | 3 | 0 | 0 | 2 | X | X | X | 8 |
| South Korea (Park) | 0 | 0 | 2 | 0 | 0 | 1 | 0 | X | X | X | 3 |

| Sheet E | 1 | 2 | 3 | 4 | 5 | 6 | 7 | 8 | 9 | 10 | Final |
|---|---|---|---|---|---|---|---|---|---|---|---|
| Poland (Rokita) 🔨 | 2 | 0 | 0 | 1 | 0 | 1 | 1 | 0 | 2 | 0 | 7 |
| Japan (Segawa) | 0 | 1 | 2 | 0 | 3 | 0 | 0 | 1 | 0 | 1 | 8 |

==== Draw 6 ====
Friday, February 27, 19:00

| Sheet A | 1 | 2 | 3 | 4 | 5 | 6 | 7 | 8 | 9 | 10 | Final |
|---|---|---|---|---|---|---|---|---|---|---|---|
| Norway (Dale) 🔨 | 0 | 0 | 0 | 0 | 0 | 0 | X | X | X | X | 0 |
| Japan (Segawa) | 1 | 0 | 1 | 0 | 2 | 3 | X | X | X | X | 7 |

| Sheet B | 1 | 2 | 3 | 4 | 5 | 6 | 7 | 8 | 9 | 10 | Final |
|---|---|---|---|---|---|---|---|---|---|---|---|
| Italy (Spiller) 🔨 | 0 | 1 | 0 | 0 | 1 | 0 | 0 | 0 | 2 | 0 | 4 |
| United States (Hebert) | 1 | 0 | 2 | 1 | 0 | 0 | 0 | 1 | 0 | 0 | 5 |

| Sheet C | 1 | 2 | 3 | 4 | 5 | 6 | 7 | 8 | 9 | 10 | Final |
|---|---|---|---|---|---|---|---|---|---|---|---|
| Poland (Rokita) 🔨 | 0 | 0 | 0 | 0 | 0 | 1 | X | X | X | X | 1 |
| Denmark (Schmidt) | 2 | 1 | 1 | 4 | 1 | 0 | X | X | X | X | 9 |

| Sheet D | 1 | 2 | 3 | 4 | 5 | 6 | 7 | 8 | 9 | 10 | 11 | Final |
|---|---|---|---|---|---|---|---|---|---|---|---|---|
| Scotland (Carson) | 0 | 0 | 0 | 0 | 0 | 1 | 0 | 1 | 0 | 2 | 0 | 4 |
| Canada (MacIsaac) 🔨 | 0 | 0 | 1 | 0 | 0 | 0 | 1 | 0 | 2 | 0 | 2 | 6 |

| Sheet E | 1 | 2 | 3 | 4 | 5 | 6 | 7 | 8 | 9 | 10 | Final |
|---|---|---|---|---|---|---|---|---|---|---|---|
| South Korea (Park) | 0 | 0 | 1 | 0 | 1 | 1 | 0 | 0 | X | X | 3 |
| Switzerland (Lüthold) 🔨 | 1 | 1 | 0 | 3 | 0 | 0 | 1 | 3 | X | X | 9 |

==== Draw 7 ====
Saturday, February 28, 14:00

| Sheet A | 1 | 2 | 3 | 4 | 5 | 6 | 7 | 8 | 9 | 10 | Final |
|---|---|---|---|---|---|---|---|---|---|---|---|
| Denmark (Schmidt) | 0 | 0 | 0 | 0 | 0 | 1 | X | X | X | X | 1 |
| Scotland (Carson) 🔨 | 3 | 4 | 3 | 0 | 0 | 0 | X | X | X | X | 10 |

| Sheet B | 1 | 2 | 3 | 4 | 5 | 6 | 7 | 8 | 9 | 10 | 11 | Final |
|---|---|---|---|---|---|---|---|---|---|---|---|---|
| South Korea (Park) 🔨 | 2 | 0 | 2 | 0 | 0 | 0 | 0 | 3 | 0 | 0 | 0 | 7 |
| Canada (MacIsaac) | 0 | 1 | 0 | 2 | 1 | 1 | 1 | 0 | 0 | 1 | 1 | 8 |

| Sheet C | 1 | 2 | 3 | 4 | 5 | 6 | 7 | 8 | 9 | 10 | Final |
|---|---|---|---|---|---|---|---|---|---|---|---|
| Japan (Segawa) 🔨 | 0 | 0 | 2 | 0 | 1 | 3 | 0 | 2 | 0 | 1 | 9 |
| Switzerland (Lüthold) | 0 | 1 | 0 | 1 | 0 | 0 | 3 | 0 | 2 | 0 | 7 |

| Sheet D | 1 | 2 | 3 | 4 | 5 | 6 | 7 | 8 | 9 | 10 | Final |
|---|---|---|---|---|---|---|---|---|---|---|---|
| Norway (Dale) | 0 | 0 | 1 | 0 | 1 | 0 | 1 | 1 | 0 | X | 4 |
| Italy (Spiller) 🔨 | 0 | 2 | 0 | 2 | 0 | 2 | 0 | 0 | 4 | X | 10 |

| Sheet E | 1 | 2 | 3 | 4 | 5 | 6 | 7 | 8 | 9 | 10 | Final |
|---|---|---|---|---|---|---|---|---|---|---|---|
| United States (Hebert) 🔨 | 2 | 2 | 1 | 0 | 2 | 0 | 2 | X | X | X | 9 |
| Poland (Rokita) | 0 | 0 | 0 | 1 | 0 | 1 | 0 | X | X | X | 2 |

==== Draw 8 ====
Sunday, March 1, 9:00

| Sheet A | 1 | 2 | 3 | 4 | 5 | 6 | 7 | 8 | 9 | 10 | Final |
|---|---|---|---|---|---|---|---|---|---|---|---|
| Switzerland (Lüthold) | 0 | 1 | 0 | 0 | 0 | 0 | X | X | X | X | 1 |
| Canada (MacIsaac) 🔨 | 3 | 0 | 0 | 3 | 1 | 2 | X | X | X | X | 9 |

| Sheet B | 1 | 2 | 3 | 4 | 5 | 6 | 7 | 8 | 9 | 10 | Final |
|---|---|---|---|---|---|---|---|---|---|---|---|
| Poland (Rokita) | 0 | 0 | 0 | 0 | 3 | 1 | 2 | 2 | 0 | 0 | 8 |
| Norway (Dale) 🔨 | 0 | 3 | 2 | 1 | 0 | 0 | 0 | 0 | 2 | 2 | 10 |

| Sheet C | 1 | 2 | 3 | 4 | 5 | 6 | 7 | 8 | 9 | 10 | Final |
|---|---|---|---|---|---|---|---|---|---|---|---|
| Scotland (Carson) 🔨 | 1 | 0 | 2 | 3 | 0 | 2 | 0 | 2 | X | X | 10 |
| South Korea (Park) | 0 | 1 | 0 | 0 | 3 | 0 | 1 | 0 | X | X | 5 |

| Sheet D | 1 | 2 | 3 | 4 | 5 | 6 | 7 | 8 | 9 | 10 | Final |
|---|---|---|---|---|---|---|---|---|---|---|---|
| United States (Hebert) | 0 | 1 | 0 | 2 | 0 | 0 | 0 | 3 | 0 | 1 | 7 |
| Denmark (Schmidt) 🔨 | 1 | 0 | 2 | 0 | 0 | 1 | 0 | 0 | 1 | 0 | 5 |

| Sheet E | 1 | 2 | 3 | 4 | 5 | 6 | 7 | 8 | 9 | 10 | Final |
|---|---|---|---|---|---|---|---|---|---|---|---|
| Japan (Segawa) 🔨 | 0 | 1 | 0 | 0 | 0 | 0 | X | X | X | X | 1 |
| Italy (Spiller) | 2 | 0 | 0 | 2 | 3 | 2 | X | X | X | X | 9 |

==== Draw 9 ====
Sunday, March 1, 19:00

| Sheet A | 1 | 2 | 3 | 4 | 5 | 6 | 7 | 8 | 9 | 10 | 11 | Final |
|---|---|---|---|---|---|---|---|---|---|---|---|---|
| Poland (Rokita) 🔨 | 0 | 1 | 0 | 0 | 1 | 1 | 0 | 3 | 0 | 0 | 0 | 6 |
| South Korea (Park) | 0 | 0 | 0 | 2 | 0 | 0 | 1 | 0 | 2 | 1 | 1 | 7 |

| Sheet B | 1 | 2 | 3 | 4 | 5 | 6 | 7 | 8 | 9 | 10 | Final |
|---|---|---|---|---|---|---|---|---|---|---|---|
| Scotland (Carson) 🔨 | 3 | 1 | 0 | 3 | 0 | 4 | X | X | X | X | 11 |
| Japan (Segawa) | 0 | 0 | 1 | 0 | 1 | 0 | X | X | X | X | 2 |

| Sheet C | 1 | 2 | 3 | 4 | 5 | 6 | 7 | 8 | 9 | 10 | Final |
|---|---|---|---|---|---|---|---|---|---|---|---|
| Denmark (Schmidt) | 0 | 1 | 0 | 1 | 0 | 2 | 0 | 1 | 0 | X | 5 |
| Norway (Dale) 🔨 | 3 | 0 | 1 | 0 | 1 | 0 | 1 | 0 | 3 | X | 9 |

| Sheet D | 1 | 2 | 3 | 4 | 5 | 6 | 7 | 8 | 9 | 10 | Final |
|---|---|---|---|---|---|---|---|---|---|---|---|
| Italy (Spiller) 🔨 | 1 | 0 | 0 | 2 | 0 | 1 | 0 | 0 | 2 | 0 | 6 |
| Switzerland (Lüthold) | 0 | 0 | 1 | 0 | 3 | 0 | 0 | 3 | 0 | 1 | 8 |

| Sheet E | 1 | 2 | 3 | 4 | 5 | 6 | 7 | 8 | 9 | 10 | Final |
|---|---|---|---|---|---|---|---|---|---|---|---|
| Canada (MacIsaac) 🔨 | 0 | 1 | 0 | 0 | 1 | 0 | 1 | 0 | 2 | 0 | 5 |
| United States (Hebert) | 1 | 0 | 2 | 1 | 0 | 1 | 0 | 1 | 0 | 1 | 7 |

=== Playoffs ===
Semifinals
1 | Scotland | 6
4 | Italy | 8
2 | United States | 7
3 | Canada | 6

Gold medal game
4 | Italy | 6
2 | United States | 8
Bronze medal game
1 | Scotland | 9
3 | Canada | 8

==== Semifinals ====
Monday, March 2, 19:00

| Sheet B | 1 | 2 | 3 | 4 | 5 | 6 | 7 | 8 | 9 | 10 | Final |
|---|---|---|---|---|---|---|---|---|---|---|---|
| United States (Hebert) 🔨 | 1 | 0 | 0 | 2 | 0 | 2 | 0 | 1 | 0 | 1 | 7 |
| Canada (MacIsaac) | 0 | 1 | 0 | 0 | 2 | 0 | 1 | 0 | 2 | 0 | 6 |

| Sheet D | 1 | 2 | 3 | 4 | 5 | 6 | 7 | 8 | 9 | 10 | Final |
|---|---|---|---|---|---|---|---|---|---|---|---|
| Scotland (Carson) 🔨 | 0 | 0 | 3 | 0 | 2 | 0 | 0 | 1 | 0 | 0 | 6 |
| Italy (Spiller) | 0 | 0 | 0 | 1 | 0 | 3 | 1 | 0 | 1 | 2 | 8 |

==== Bronze medal game ====
Tuesday, March 3, 14:00

| Sheet A | 1 | 2 | 3 | 4 | 5 | 6 | 7 | 8 | 9 | 10 | Final |
|---|---|---|---|---|---|---|---|---|---|---|---|
| Canada (MacIsaac) | 0 | 2 | 0 | 2 | 0 | 0 | 1 | 0 | 2 | 1 | 8 |
| Scotland (Carson) 🔨 | 2 | 0 | 2 | 0 | 2 | 1 | 0 | 2 | 0 | 0 | 9 |

==== Gold medal game ====
Tuesday, March 3, 14:00

| Sheet C | 1 | 2 | 3 | 4 | 5 | 6 | 7 | 8 | 9 | 10 | Final |
|---|---|---|---|---|---|---|---|---|---|---|---|
| United States (Hebert) 🔨 | 2 | 0 | 2 | 0 | 1 | 1 | 0 | 2 | 0 | X | 8 |
| Italy (Spiller) | 0 | 1 | 0 | 2 | 0 | 0 | 1 | 0 | 2 | X | 6 |

=== Final standings ===
| Place | Team |
|---|---|
| 1st place, gold medalist(s) | United States |
| 2nd place, silver medalist(s) | Italy |
| 3rd place, bronze medalist(s) | Scotland |
| 4 | Canada |
| 5 | Switzerland |
| 6 | Norway |
| 7 | Denmark |
| 8 | Japan |
| 9 | South Korea |
| 10 | Poland |

== Women ==
=== Qualification ===
The following nations qualified to participate in the 2026 World Junior Curling Championship:

| Event | Vacancies | Qualified |
|---|---|---|
| Host Nation | 1 | Denmark |
| 2025 World Junior Curling Championships | 6 | South Korea; Germany; Canada; Sweden; China; Switzerland |
| 2025 World Junior-B Curling Championships | 3 | Japan; United States; Turkey |
| TOTAL | 10 | |

=== Teams ===
The teams are listed as follows:

| Canada | China | Denmark | Germany | Japan |
|---|---|---|---|---|
| Skip: Myla Plett; Third: Alyssa Nedohin; Second: Chloe Fediuk; Lead: Allie Iskiw; Alternate: Abby Whitbread | Skip: Wang Zhuoyi; Third: Mu Jiayin; Second: Chen Zaoxue; Lead: Dong Shihan; Alternate: Liu Chenxi | Skip: Katrine Schmidt; Third: Ninne Vilandt; Second: Emilie Holtermann; Lead: Caroline Rasmussen | Skip: Sara Messenzehl; Third: Emma Waltenberger; Second: Marina Schwarz; Lead: Matilda Pyroth; Alternate: Jule Lang | Skip: Yuina Miura; Third: Kohane Tsuruga; Second: Rin Suzuki; Lead: Aone Nakamura; Alternate: Hana Ikeda |
| South Korea | Sweden | Switzerland | Turkey | United States |
| Skip: Kang Bo-bae; Third: Shim Yu-jeong; Second: Lee Bo-young; Lead: Lee You-sun; Alternate: Park Yea-lynn | Skip: Moa Dryburgh; Third: Moa Tjärnlund; Second: Thea Orefjord; Lead: Maja Roxin; Alternate: Erika Ryberg | Fourth: Jana Hoffmann; Third: Jana-Tamara Hählen; Second: Renée Frigo; Skip: Elodie Jerger; Alternate: Jana Soltermann | Skip: Melisa Cömert; Third: Derya Ekmekci; Second: Suheda Karacali; Lead: Şeydanur Morkoç; Alternate: Zeynep Genç | Skip: Allory Johnson; Third: Gianna Johnson; Second: Morgan Zacher; Lead: Bailey Vaydich; Alternate: Ella Wendling |

=== Round robin standings ===
Final Round Robin Standings

Key
| Teams to Playoffs |

| Country | Skip | W | L | W–L | PF | PA | EW | EL | BE | SE | DSC |
|---|---|---|---|---|---|---|---|---|---|---|---|
| South Korea | Kang Bo-bae | 8 | 1 | – | 84 | 33 | 40 | 26 | 2 | 13 | 32.03 |
| Sweden | Moa Dryburgh | 7 | 2 | – | 72 | 43 | 42 | 28 | 3 | 16 | 42.08 |
| China | Wang Zhuoyi | 6 | 3 | – | 66 | 70 | 40 | 40 | 5 | 11 | 31.74 |
| United States | Allory Johnson | 5 | 4 | 2–1; 1–0 | 65 | 66 | 36 | 38 | 3 | 11 | 43.01 |
| Switzerland | Elodie Jerger | 5 | 4 | 2–1; 0–1 | 69 | 65 | 38 | 35 | 3 | 12 | 51.52 |
| Canada | Myla Plett | 5 | 4 | 1–2; 1–0 | 58 | 55 | 38 | 37 | 0 | 9 | 29.67 |
| Japan | Yuina Miura | 5 | 4 | 1–2; 0–1 | 56 | 48 | 36 | 36 | 1 | 13 | 54.73 |
| Denmark | Katrine Schmidt | 2 | 7 | – | 42 | 66 | 28 | 39 | 5 | 9 | 50.72 |
| Turkey | Melisa Cömert | 1 | 8 | 1–0 | 47 | 85 | 33 | 44 | 1 | 7 | 83.71 |
| Germany | Sara Messenzehl | 1 | 8 | 0–1 | 40 | 68 | 31 | 39 | 4 | 6 | 79.39 |

Round robin summary table
| Pos. | Country | Canada | China | Denmark | Germany | Japan | South Korea | Sweden | Switzerland | Turkey | United States | Record |
|---|---|---|---|---|---|---|---|---|---|---|---|---|
| 6 | Canada | — | 6–8 | 9–1 | 8–6 | 8–3 | 7–6 | 5–9 | 3–8 | 9–4 | 3–10 | 5–4 |
| 3 | China | 8–6 | — | 9–5 | 8–6 | 3–9 | 3–11 | 9–8 | 10–8 | 9–7 | 7–10 | 6–3 |
| 8 | Denmark | 1–9 | 5–9 | — | 4–5 | 4–7 | 2–7 | 0–12 | 4–8 | 11–4 | 11–5 | 2–7 |
| 10 | Germany | 6–8 | 6–8 | 5–4 | — | 3–7 | 2–9 | 1–7 | 4–9 | 5–6 | 8–10 | 1–8 |
| 7 | Japan | 3–9 | 9–3 | 7–4 | 7–3 | — | 1–7 | 5–8 | 6–8 | 9–3 | 9–4 | 5–4 |
| 1 | South Korea | 6–7 | 11–3 | 7–2 | 9–2 | 7–1 | — | 7–5 | 12–4 | 14–4 | 11–5 | 8–1 |
| 2 | Sweden | 9–5 | 8–9 | 12–0 | 7–1 | 8–5 | 5–7 | — | 9–6 | 8–7 | 6–3 | 7–2 |
| 5 | Switzerland | 8–3 | 8–10 | 8–4 | 9–4 | 8–6 | 4–12 | 6–9 | — | 12–7 | 6–10 | 5–4 |
| 9 | Turkey | 4–9 | 7–9 | 4–11 | 6–5 | 3–9 | 4–14 | 7–8 | 7–12 | — | 5–8 | 1–8 |
| 4 | United States | 10–3 | 10–7 | 5–11 | 10–8 | 4–9 | 5–11 | 3–6 | 10–6 | 8–5 | — | 5–4 |

=== Round robin results ===
All draw times are listed in Central European Time (UTC+01:00).

==== Draw 1 ====
Tuesday, February 24, 9:00

| Sheet A | 1 | 2 | 3 | 4 | 5 | 6 | 7 | 8 | 9 | 10 | 11 | Final |
|---|---|---|---|---|---|---|---|---|---|---|---|---|
| Germany (Messenzehl) | 0 | 2 | 0 | 1 | 0 | 1 | 0 | 1 | 0 | 1 | 0 | 6 |
| China (Wang) 🔨 | 1 | 0 | 1 | 0 | 1 | 0 | 2 | 0 | 1 | 0 | 2 | 8 |

| Sheet B | 1 | 2 | 3 | 4 | 5 | 6 | 7 | 8 | 9 | 10 | Final |
|---|---|---|---|---|---|---|---|---|---|---|---|
| Canada (Plett) 🔨 | 1 | 0 | 2 | 1 | 0 | 1 | 2 | 0 | 1 | X | 8 |
| Japan (Miura) | 0 | 1 | 0 | 0 | 1 | 0 | 0 | 1 | 0 | X | 3 |

| Sheet C | 1 | 2 | 3 | 4 | 5 | 6 | 7 | 8 | 9 | 10 | Final |
|---|---|---|---|---|---|---|---|---|---|---|---|
| Turkey (Cömert) | 0 | 0 | 2 | 0 | 0 | 1 | 1 | 0 | X | X | 4 |
| South Korea (Kang) 🔨 | 5 | 1 | 0 | 4 | 2 | 0 | 0 | 2 | X | X | 14 |

| Sheet D | 1 | 2 | 3 | 4 | 5 | 6 | 7 | 8 | 9 | 10 | Final |
|---|---|---|---|---|---|---|---|---|---|---|---|
| Sweden (Dryburgh) 🔨 | 0 | 0 | 1 | 0 | 0 | 3 | 1 | 0 | 1 | X | 6 |
| United States (Johnson) | 0 | 1 | 0 | 0 | 1 | 0 | 0 | 1 | 0 | X | 3 |

| Sheet E | 1 | 2 | 3 | 4 | 5 | 6 | 7 | 8 | 9 | 10 | Final |
|---|---|---|---|---|---|---|---|---|---|---|---|
| Switzerland (Jerger) | 0 | 1 | 0 | 0 | 2 | 0 | 2 | 0 | 3 | X | 8 |
| Denmark (Schmidt) 🔨 | 0 | 0 | 1 | 1 | 0 | 0 | 0 | 2 | 0 | X | 4 |

==== Draw 2 ====
Tuesday, February 24, 19:30

| Sheet A | 1 | 2 | 3 | 4 | 5 | 6 | 7 | 8 | 9 | 10 | Final |
|---|---|---|---|---|---|---|---|---|---|---|---|
| Japan (Miura) | 0 | 0 | 2 | 0 | 0 | 1 | 0 | 2 | 0 | X | 5 |
| Sweden (Dryburgh) 🔨 | 1 | 2 | 0 | 1 | 1 | 0 | 2 | 0 | 1 | X | 8 |

| Sheet B | 1 | 2 | 3 | 4 | 5 | 6 | 7 | 8 | 9 | 10 | Final |
|---|---|---|---|---|---|---|---|---|---|---|---|
| China (Wang) 🔨 | 0 | 2 | 0 | 0 | 2 | 0 | 2 | 0 | 1 | 0 | 7 |
| United States (Johnson) | 0 | 0 | 1 | 5 | 0 | 1 | 0 | 1 | 0 | 2 | 10 |

| Sheet C | 1 | 2 | 3 | 4 | 5 | 6 | 7 | 8 | 9 | 10 | Final |
|---|---|---|---|---|---|---|---|---|---|---|---|
| Switzerland (Jerger) 🔨 | 1 | 0 | 4 | 0 | 0 | 0 | 4 | X | X | X | 9 |
| Germany (Messenzehl) | 0 | 1 | 0 | 2 | 0 | 1 | 0 | X | X | X | 4 |

| Sheet D | 1 | 2 | 3 | 4 | 5 | 6 | 7 | 8 | 9 | 10 | Final |
|---|---|---|---|---|---|---|---|---|---|---|---|
| Denmark (Schmidt) 🔨 | 0 | 0 | 1 | 0 | 0 | 1 | X | X | X | X | 2 |
| South Korea (Kang) | 2 | 1 | 0 | 2 | 2 | 0 | X | X | X | X | 7 |

| Sheet E | 1 | 2 | 3 | 4 | 5 | 6 | 7 | 8 | 9 | 10 | Final |
|---|---|---|---|---|---|---|---|---|---|---|---|
| Canada (Plett) 🔨 | 1 | 0 | 4 | 0 | 0 | 3 | 1 | 0 | X | X | 9 |
| Turkey (Cömert) | 0 | 1 | 0 | 1 | 1 | 0 | 0 | 1 | X | X | 4 |

==== Draw 3 ====
Wednesday, February 25, 14:00

| Sheet A | 1 | 2 | 3 | 4 | 5 | 6 | 7 | 8 | 9 | 10 | 11 | Final |
|---|---|---|---|---|---|---|---|---|---|---|---|---|
| South Korea (Kang) 🔨 | 0 | 0 | 1 | 0 | 0 | 1 | 0 | 1 | 0 | 3 | 0 | 6 |
| Canada (Plett) | 0 | 0 | 0 | 1 | 1 | 0 | 2 | 0 | 2 | 0 | 1 | 7 |

| Sheet B | 1 | 2 | 3 | 4 | 5 | 6 | 7 | 8 | 9 | 10 | Final |
|---|---|---|---|---|---|---|---|---|---|---|---|
| Germany (Messenzehl) | 0 | 0 | 1 | 0 | 0 | 0 | 2 | 0 | 1 | 1 | 5 |
| Denmark (Schmidt) 🔨 | 1 | 1 | 0 | 1 | 1 | 0 | 0 | 0 | 0 | 0 | 4 |

| Sheet C | 1 | 2 | 3 | 4 | 5 | 6 | 7 | 8 | 9 | 10 | Final |
|---|---|---|---|---|---|---|---|---|---|---|---|
| China (Wang) 🔨 | 0 | 1 | 0 | 0 | 2 | 0 | 2 | 0 | 2 | 2 | 9 |
| Sweden (Dryburgh) | 2 | 0 | 3 | 0 | 0 | 1 | 0 | 2 | 0 | 0 | 8 |

| Sheet D | 1 | 2 | 3 | 4 | 5 | 6 | 7 | 8 | 9 | 10 | Final |
|---|---|---|---|---|---|---|---|---|---|---|---|
| Turkey (Cömert) | 0 | 0 | 2 | 0 | 3 | 0 | 1 | 1 | 0 | X | 7 |
| Switzerland (Jerger) 🔨 | 3 | 1 | 0 | 2 | 0 | 2 | 0 | 0 | 4 | X | 12 |

| Sheet E | 1 | 2 | 3 | 4 | 5 | 6 | 7 | 8 | 9 | 10 | Final |
|---|---|---|---|---|---|---|---|---|---|---|---|
| Japan (Miura) | 0 | 0 | 1 | 2 | 0 | 1 | 2 | 1 | 2 | X | 9 |
| United States (Johnson) 🔨 | 0 | 1 | 0 | 0 | 3 | 0 | 0 | 0 | 0 | X | 4 |

==== Draw 4 ====
Thursday, February 26, 9:00

| Sheet A | 1 | 2 | 3 | 4 | 5 | 6 | 7 | 8 | 9 | 10 | Final |
|---|---|---|---|---|---|---|---|---|---|---|---|
| United States (Johnson) 🔨 | 0 | 2 | 2 | 2 | 1 | 0 | 3 | 0 | X | X | 10 |
| Switzerland (Jerger) | 1 | 0 | 0 | 0 | 0 | 3 | 0 | 2 | X | X | 6 |

| Sheet B | 1 | 2 | 3 | 4 | 5 | 6 | 7 | 8 | 9 | 10 | Final |
|---|---|---|---|---|---|---|---|---|---|---|---|
| Turkey (Cömert) 🔨 | 1 | 0 | 4 | 0 | 1 | 0 | 0 | 0 | 1 | X | 7 |
| Sweden (Dryburgh) | 0 | 2 | 0 | 2 | 0 | 2 | 1 | 1 | 0 | X | 8 |

| Sheet C | 1 | 2 | 3 | 4 | 5 | 6 | 7 | 8 | 9 | 10 | Final |
|---|---|---|---|---|---|---|---|---|---|---|---|
| Denmark (Schmidt) 🔨 | 0 | 1 | 0 | 2 | 0 | 0 | 0 | 1 | 0 | X | 4 |
| Japan (Miura) | 0 | 0 | 1 | 0 | 1 | 1 | 1 | 0 | 3 | X | 7 |

| Sheet D | 1 | 2 | 3 | 4 | 5 | 6 | 7 | 8 | 9 | 10 | Final |
|---|---|---|---|---|---|---|---|---|---|---|---|
| South Korea (Kang) 🔨 | 2 | 2 | 0 | 2 | 0 | 0 | 3 | X | X | X | 9 |
| Germany (Messenzehl) | 0 | 0 | 1 | 0 | 0 | 1 | 0 | X | X | X | 2 |

| Sheet E | 1 | 2 | 3 | 4 | 5 | 6 | 7 | 8 | 9 | 10 | Final |
|---|---|---|---|---|---|---|---|---|---|---|---|
| China (Wang) 🔨 | 0 | 2 | 1 | 0 | 1 | 0 | 2 | 0 | 2 | 0 | 8 |
| Canada (Plett) | 0 | 0 | 0 | 1 | 0 | 2 | 0 | 2 | 0 | 1 | 6 |

==== Draw 5 ====
Thursday, February 26, 19:00

| Sheet A | 1 | 2 | 3 | 4 | 5 | 6 | 7 | 8 | 9 | 10 | Final |
|---|---|---|---|---|---|---|---|---|---|---|---|
| Turkey (Cömert) | 0 | 0 | 1 | 0 | 0 | 1 | 0 | 0 | 1 | X | 3 |
| Japan (Miura) 🔨 | 2 | 1 | 0 | 0 | 3 | 0 | 1 | 2 | 0 | X | 9 |

| Sheet B | 1 | 2 | 3 | 4 | 5 | 6 | 7 | 8 | 9 | 10 | Final |
|---|---|---|---|---|---|---|---|---|---|---|---|
| Switzerland (Jerger) | 0 | 0 | 0 | 0 | 4 | 1 | 2 | 0 | 0 | 1 | 8 |
| China (Wang) 🔨 | 0 | 3 | 2 | 3 | 0 | 0 | 0 | 1 | 1 | 0 | 10 |

| Sheet C | 1 | 2 | 3 | 4 | 5 | 6 | 7 | 8 | 9 | 10 | Final |
|---|---|---|---|---|---|---|---|---|---|---|---|
| Germany (Messenzehl) | 0 | 3 | 0 | 2 | 0 | 2 | 0 | 1 | 0 | 0 | 8 |
| United States (Johnson) 🔨 | 1 | 0 | 1 | 0 | 3 | 0 | 1 | 0 | 3 | 1 | 10 |

| Sheet D | 1 | 2 | 3 | 4 | 5 | 6 | 7 | 8 | 9 | 10 | Final |
|---|---|---|---|---|---|---|---|---|---|---|---|
| Canada (Plett) 🔨 | 2 | 0 | 0 | 2 | 3 | 2 | X | X | X | X | 9 |
| Denmark (Schmidt) | 0 | 0 | 1 | 0 | 0 | 0 | X | X | X | X | 1 |

| Sheet E | 1 | 2 | 3 | 4 | 5 | 6 | 7 | 8 | 9 | 10 | Final |
|---|---|---|---|---|---|---|---|---|---|---|---|
| Sweden (Dryburgh) | 0 | 1 | 1 | 0 | 1 | 0 | 1 | 0 | 1 | 0 | 5 |
| South Korea (Kang) 🔨 | 1 | 0 | 0 | 2 | 0 | 1 | 0 | 2 | 0 | 1 | 7 |

==== Draw 6 ====
Friday, February 27, 14:00

| Sheet A | 1 | 2 | 3 | 4 | 5 | 6 | 7 | 8 | 9 | 10 | Final |
|---|---|---|---|---|---|---|---|---|---|---|---|
| Switzerland (Jerger) | 0 | 1 | 0 | 1 | 0 | 2 | 0 | X | X | X | 4 |
| South Korea (Kang) 🔨 | 2 | 0 | 5 | 0 | 3 | 0 | 2 | X | X | X | 12 |

| Sheet B | 1 | 2 | 3 | 4 | 5 | 6 | 7 | 8 | 9 | 10 | Final |
|---|---|---|---|---|---|---|---|---|---|---|---|
| Japan (Miura) | 0 | 2 | 0 | 1 | 3 | 1 | 0 | X | X | X | 7 |
| Germany (Messenzehl) 🔨 | 1 | 0 | 1 | 0 | 0 | 0 | 1 | X | X | X | 3 |

| Sheet C | 1 | 2 | 3 | 4 | 5 | 6 | 7 | 8 | 9 | 10 | Final |
|---|---|---|---|---|---|---|---|---|---|---|---|
| Sweden (Dryburgh) 🔨 | 0 | 1 | 1 | 0 | 2 | 0 | 3 | 0 | 2 | X | 9 |
| Canada (Plett) | 0 | 0 | 0 | 2 | 0 | 1 | 0 | 2 | 0 | X | 5 |

| Sheet D | 1 | 2 | 3 | 4 | 5 | 6 | 7 | 8 | 9 | 10 | Final |
|---|---|---|---|---|---|---|---|---|---|---|---|
| United States (Johnson) | 0 | 3 | 0 | 2 | 2 | 0 | 0 | 1 | 0 | X | 8 |
| Turkey (Cömert) 🔨 | 2 | 0 | 1 | 0 | 0 | 1 | 0 | 0 | 1 | X | 5 |

| Sheet E | 1 | 2 | 3 | 4 | 5 | 6 | 7 | 8 | 9 | 10 | Final |
|---|---|---|---|---|---|---|---|---|---|---|---|
| Denmark (Schmidt) | 0 | 0 | 0 | 1 | 1 | 0 | 1 | 0 | 2 | X | 5 |
| China (Wang) 🔨 | 2 | 2 | 2 | 0 | 0 | 2 | 0 | 1 | 0 | X | 9 |

==== Draw 7 ====
Saturday, February 28, 9:00

| Sheet A | 1 | 2 | 3 | 4 | 5 | 6 | 7 | 8 | 9 | 10 | Final |
|---|---|---|---|---|---|---|---|---|---|---|---|
| Canada (Plett) | 0 | 0 | 1 | 0 | 1 | 1 | 0 | X | X | X | 3 |
| United States (Johnson) 🔨 | 1 | 3 | 0 | 1 | 0 | 0 | 5 | X | X | X | 10 |

| Sheet B | 1 | 2 | 3 | 4 | 5 | 6 | 7 | 8 | 9 | 10 | Final |
|---|---|---|---|---|---|---|---|---|---|---|---|
| Denmark (Schmidt) 🔨 | 2 | 0 | 2 | 1 | 1 | 0 | 0 | 1 | 4 | X | 11 |
| Turkey (Cömert) | 0 | 2 | 0 | 0 | 0 | 1 | 1 | 0 | 0 | X | 4 |

| Sheet C | 1 | 2 | 3 | 4 | 5 | 6 | 7 | 8 | 9 | 10 | Final |
|---|---|---|---|---|---|---|---|---|---|---|---|
| South Korea (Kang) 🔨 | 2 | 0 | 5 | 0 | 1 | 3 | X | X | X | X | 11 |
| China (Wang) | 0 | 1 | 0 | 2 | 0 | 0 | X | X | X | X | 3 |

| Sheet D | 1 | 2 | 3 | 4 | 5 | 6 | 7 | 8 | 9 | 10 | Final |
|---|---|---|---|---|---|---|---|---|---|---|---|
| Switzerland (Jerger) 🔨 | 1 | 0 | 1 | 2 | 0 | 0 | 0 | 1 | 0 | 3 | 8 |
| Japan (Miura) | 0 | 2 | 0 | 0 | 2 | 1 | 0 | 0 | 1 | 0 | 6 |

| Sheet E | 1 | 2 | 3 | 4 | 5 | 6 | 7 | 8 | 9 | 10 | Final |
|---|---|---|---|---|---|---|---|---|---|---|---|
| Germany (Messenzehl) | 0 | 0 | 0 | 0 | 0 | 1 | X | X | X | X | 1 |
| Sweden (Dryburgh) 🔨 | 0 | 3 | 0 | 1 | 3 | 0 | X | X | X | X | 7 |

==== Draw 8 ====
Saturday, February 28, 19:00

| Sheet A | 1 | 2 | 3 | 4 | 5 | 6 | 7 | 8 | 9 | 10 | Final |
|---|---|---|---|---|---|---|---|---|---|---|---|
| China (Wang) | 1 | 2 | 0 | 0 | 0 | 0 | 2 | 2 | 2 | 0 | 9 |
| Turkey (Cömert) 🔨 | 0 | 0 | 1 | 2 | 2 | 1 | 0 | 0 | 0 | 1 | 7 |

| Sheet B | 1 | 2 | 3 | 4 | 5 | 6 | 7 | 8 | 9 | 10 | Final |
|---|---|---|---|---|---|---|---|---|---|---|---|
| Sweden (Dryburgh) | 0 | 2 | 0 | 3 | 0 | 0 | 3 | 0 | 1 | X | 9 |
| Switzerland (Jerger) 🔨 | 0 | 0 | 1 | 0 | 2 | 2 | 0 | 1 | 0 | X | 6 |

| Sheet C | 1 | 2 | 3 | 4 | 5 | 6 | 7 | 8 | 9 | 10 | Final |
|---|---|---|---|---|---|---|---|---|---|---|---|
| United States (Johnson) | 0 | 1 | 0 | 1 | 2 | 1 | 0 | 0 | 0 | X | 5 |
| Denmark (Schmidt) 🔨 | 2 | 0 | 2 | 0 | 0 | 0 | 1 | 4 | 2 | X | 11 |

| Sheet D | 1 | 2 | 3 | 4 | 5 | 6 | 7 | 8 | 9 | 10 | Final |
|---|---|---|---|---|---|---|---|---|---|---|---|
| Germany (Messenzehl) | 0 | 1 | 0 | 0 | 1 | 0 | 3 | 1 | 0 | 0 | 6 |
| Canada (Plett) 🔨 | 2 | 0 | 2 | 1 | 0 | 1 | 0 | 0 | 1 | 1 | 8 |

| Sheet E | 1 | 2 | 3 | 4 | 5 | 6 | 7 | 8 | 9 | 10 | Final |
|---|---|---|---|---|---|---|---|---|---|---|---|
| South Korea (Kang) 🔨 | 1 | 2 | 1 | 2 | 1 | 0 | X | X | X | X | 7 |
| Japan (Miura) | 0 | 0 | 0 | 0 | 0 | 1 | X | X | X | X | 1 |

==== Draw 9 ====
Sunday, March 1, 14:00

| Sheet A | 1 | 2 | 3 | 4 | 5 | 6 | 7 | 8 | 9 | 10 | Final |
|---|---|---|---|---|---|---|---|---|---|---|---|
| Sweden (Dryburgh) 🔨 | 1 | 2 | 1 | 3 | 2 | 3 | X | X | X | X | 12 |
| Denmark (Schmidt) | 0 | 0 | 0 | 0 | 0 | 0 | X | X | X | X | 0 |

| Sheet B | 1 | 2 | 3 | 4 | 5 | 6 | 7 | 8 | 9 | 10 | Final |
|---|---|---|---|---|---|---|---|---|---|---|---|
| United States (Johnson) | 0 | 0 | 0 | 2 | 0 | 2 | 1 | 0 | X | X | 5 |
| South Korea (Kang) 🔨 | 2 | 1 | 2 | 0 | 3 | 0 | 0 | 3 | X | X | 11 |

| Sheet C | 1 | 2 | 3 | 4 | 5 | 6 | 7 | 8 | 9 | 10 | Final |
|---|---|---|---|---|---|---|---|---|---|---|---|
| Canada (Plett) 🔨 | 1 | 0 | 1 | 0 | 0 | 1 | 0 | 0 | 0 | 0 | 3 |
| Switzerland (Jerger) | 0 | 1 | 0 | 2 | 1 | 0 | 1 | 1 | 1 | 1 | 8 |

| Sheet D | 1 | 2 | 3 | 4 | 5 | 6 | 7 | 8 | 9 | 10 | Final |
|---|---|---|---|---|---|---|---|---|---|---|---|
| Japan (Miura) 🔨 | 2 | 0 | 3 | 0 | 2 | 1 | 0 | 1 | 0 | X | 9 |
| China (Wang) | 0 | 1 | 0 | 0 | 0 | 0 | 1 | 0 | 1 | X | 3 |

| Sheet E | 1 | 2 | 3 | 4 | 5 | 6 | 7 | 8 | 9 | 10 | Final |
|---|---|---|---|---|---|---|---|---|---|---|---|
| Turkey (Cömert) | 0 | 0 | 0 | 0 | 2 | 0 | 0 | 3 | 0 | 1 | 6 |
| Germany (Messenzehl) 🔨 | 1 | 0 | 1 | 1 | 0 | 0 | 1 | 0 | 1 | 0 | 5 |

=== Playoffs ===
Semifinals
1 | South Korea | 6
4 | United States | 5
2 | Sweden | 8
3 | China | 4

Gold medal game
1 | South Korea | 14
2 | Sweden | 7
Bronze medal game
4 | United States | 4
3 | China | 11

==== Semifinals ====
Monday, March 2, 14:00

| Sheet B | 1 | 2 | 3 | 4 | 5 | 6 | 7 | 8 | 9 | 10 | Final |
|---|---|---|---|---|---|---|---|---|---|---|---|
| Sweden (Dryburgh) 🔨 | 0 | 0 | 2 | 0 | 2 | 0 | 0 | 2 | 1 | 1 | 8 |
| China (Wang) | 0 | 1 | 0 | 2 | 0 | 1 | 0 | 0 | 0 | 0 | 4 |

| Sheet D | 1 | 2 | 3 | 4 | 5 | 6 | 7 | 8 | 9 | 10 | Final |
|---|---|---|---|---|---|---|---|---|---|---|---|
| South Korea (Kang) 🔨 | 0 | 0 | 1 | 1 | 0 | 0 | 0 | 2 | 0 | 2 | 6 |
| United States (Johnson) | 1 | 1 | 0 | 0 | 1 | 0 | 0 | 0 | 2 | 0 | 5 |

==== Bronze medal game ====
Tuesday, March 3, 9:00

| Sheet A | 1 | 2 | 3 | 4 | 5 | 6 | 7 | 8 | 9 | 10 | Final |
|---|---|---|---|---|---|---|---|---|---|---|---|
| United States (Johnson) | 0 | 1 | 0 | 0 | 2 | 0 | 1 | 0 | 0 | X | 4 |
| China (Wang) 🔨 | 2 | 0 | 3 | 1 | 0 | 2 | 0 | 1 | 2 | X | 11 |

==== Gold medal game ====
Tuesday, March 3, 9:00

| Sheet C | 1 | 2 | 3 | 4 | 5 | 6 | 7 | 8 | 9 | 10 | Final |
|---|---|---|---|---|---|---|---|---|---|---|---|
| South Korea (Kang) 🔨 | 3 | 0 | 2 | 0 | 5 | 0 | 1 | 0 | 3 | X | 14 |
| Sweden (Dryburgh) | 0 | 2 | 0 | 2 | 0 | 1 | 0 | 2 | 0 | X | 7 |

=== Final standings ===
| Place | Team |
|---|---|
| 1st place, gold medalist(s) | South Korea |
| 2nd place, silver medalist(s) | Sweden |
| 3rd place, bronze medalist(s) | China |
| 4 | United States |
| 5 | Switzerland |
| 6 | Canada |
| 7 | Japan |
| 8 | Denmark |
| 9 | Turkey |
| 10 | Germany |
