= 2025 World Junior-B Curling Championships =

- Host city: Lohja, Finland
- Arena: Kisakallio Sports Institute
- Dates: December 7–20
- Men's winner: United States
- Skip: Caden Hebert
- Third: Jackson Bestland
- Second: Benji Paral
- Lead: Jack Wendtland
- Alternate: Daniel Laufer
- Coach: Michael Peplinski
- Finalist: Switzerland (Lüthold)
- Women's winner: Japan
- Skip: Yuina Miura
- Third: Kohane Tsuruga
- Second: Rin Suzuki
- Lead: Hana Ikeda
- Alternate: Aone Nakamura
- Coach: Takayuki Doi
- Finalist: United States (Johnson)

The 2025 World Junior-B Curling Championships was held from December 7 to 20 at the Kisakallio Sports Institute in Lohja, Finland. The women's competition was from December 7 to 13, with the men's competition following from December 15 to 20. The top three men's teams and top three women's teams will qualify for the 2026 World Junior Curling Championships in Tårnby, Denmark.

== Men ==
=== Teams ===
The teams are listed as follows:

Australia	Austria	China	Chinese Taipei	Czech Republic
Skip: Thomas Bence; Third: Flynn Collins; Second: Matthew Quinn; Lead: Daniel Collins; Alternate: Samuel Quinn	Skip: Florian Kramlinger; Third: Christoph Neumayr; Second: Marcel Resch; Lead: Johannes Kramlinger; Alternate: Elias Resch	Skip: Liu Guangshen; Third: Zhu Yupeng; Second: Yu Feng; Lead: Feng Weihuang; Alternate: Tang Shuai	Skip: Chen Shou-Yi; Third: Jin Hui-Lun; Second: Lin Hui-En; Lead: Hsu Chih-Ying; Alternate: Chang Yu-Hung	Skip: Ondřej Bláha; Third: Jakub Matějček; Second: Jan Matějček; Lead: Vojtěch Švec; Alternate: Tobias Votava
England	Germany	Hungary	Latvia	New Zealand
Skip: Matthew Waring; Third: Callum McLain; Second: Benjamin Gillard; Lead: Troy Caunce; Alternate: Niall McLoughlin	Skip: Leonhard Angrick; Third: Lukas Jäger; Second: Adrian Enders; Lead: Raphael Amberger; Alternate: Antonio Wiethe	Skip: Arpad Karpati; Third: Zalan Drum; Second: Eloed Karpati; Lead: Janos Ur	Skip: Kristaps Zass; Third: Krisjanis Java; Second: Deniss Smirnovs; Lead: Rihards Janbergs	Skip: Jed Nevill; Third: William Loe; Second: Jack Steele; Lead: Abraham Chanwong; Alternate: Cyrus Wei
Philippines	Poland	Romania	Slovakia	Slovenia
Skip: Dylan Skaggs; Third: Tyler Skaggs; Second: Felix Hester; Lead: Elijah Mojado	Skip: Szymon Rokita; Third: Antoni Frynia; Second: Arkadiusz Frysz; Lead: Kamil Rokita	Fourth: Tudor Pop; Third: Toma Felecan; Skip: Dan Ghergie; Lead: Tudor Mihalca; Alternate: Catalin Vancea	Skip: Sebastian Trajanov; Third: Stanislav Mashutin; Second: Samuel Scevlik; Lead: Samuel Vavrovic; Alternate: Radovan Schueller	Skip: Zan Krapez; Third: Ernest Erjavec-Bizjak; Second: Bor Kelemina; Lead: Andraz Gosar-Kocevar
Spain	Sweden	Switzerland	Turkey	United States
Skip: Eneko Saez; Third: Alejandro Cardona; Second: Pablo López; Lead: Aleksei Palacin; Alternate: Pere Mas	Skip: Vilmer Nygren; Third: Alexander Dryburgh; Second: Conrad Schalley; Lead: Jonatan Meyerson; Alternate: Kalle Claesson	Skip: Felix Lüthold; Third: Leon Wittich; Second: Livio Ernst; Lead: Jonas Feierabend; Alternate: Nils Freimann	Skip: Muhammed Zenit; Third: Oguzhan Kaya; Second: Emre Karakurt; Lead: Muhammed Karahan; Alternate: Muhammet Kishali	Skip: Caden Hebert; Third: Jackson Bestland; Second: Benji Paral; Lead: Jack Wendtland; Alternate: Daniel Laufer

=== Round robin standings ===
Final Round Robin Standings

Key
Teams to Playoffs

Group A	Skip	W	L	W–L	DSC
Germany	Leonhard Angrick	5	1	1–1	42.178
Poland	Szymon Rokita	5	1	1–1	52.256
Turkey	Muhammed Zenit	5	1	1–1	87.022
Philippines	Dylan Skaggs	2	4	1–1	92.567
New Zealand	Jed Nevill	2	4	1–1	96.733
Spain	Eneko Saez	2	4	1–1	139.867
Slovakia	Sebastian Trajanov	0	6	–	117.711

Group B	Skip	W	L	W–L	DSC
China	Liu Guangshen	6	0	–	55.967
Sweden	Vilmer Nygren	5	1	–	61.944
Latvia	Kristaps Zass	4	2	–	45.422
Czech Republic	Ondřej Bláha	3	3	–	68.278
Romania	Dan Ghergie	2	4	–	90.889
Slovenia	Zan Krapez	1	5	–	98.478
Chinese Taipei	Chen Shou-Yi	0	6	–	155.400

Group C	Skip	W	L	W–L	DSC
United States	Caden Hebert	5	0	–	28.267
Switzerland	Felix Lüthold	4	1	–	65.489
Australia	Thomas Bence	2	3	1–0	69.800
Hungary	Arpad Karpati	2	3	0–1	70.267
Austria	Florian Kramlinger	1	4	1–0	106.989
England	Matthew Waring	1	4	0–1	73.478

Ranking of 3rd Place Teams	Skip	Group	DSC
Latvia	Kristaps Zass	B	45.422
Australia	Thomas Bence	C	69.800
Turkey	Muhammed Zenit	A	87.022

Group A Round Robin Summary Table
Pos.	Country	Germany	New Zealand	Philippines	Poland	Slovakia	Spain	Turkey	Record
1	Germany	—	8–4	5–3	3–5	7–2	7–1	7–2	5–1
5	New Zealand	4–8	—	7–6	5–7	6–5	5–6	5–6	2–4
4	Philippines	3–5	6–7	—	1–4	8–3	4–3	4–12	2–4
2	Poland	5–3	7–5	4–1	—	8–1	11–3	4–6	5–1
7	Slovakia	2–7	5–6	3–8	1–8	—	4–6	3–8	0–6
6	Spain	1–7	6–5	3–4	3–11	6–4	—	0–11	2–4
3	Turkey	2–7	6–5	12–4	6–4	8–3	11–0	—	5–1

Group B Round Robin Summary Table
Pos.	Country	China	Chinese Taipei	Czech Republic	Latvia	Romania	Slovenia	Sweden	Record
1	China	—	14–1	8–2	11–6	9–0	12–0	7–0	6–0
7	Chinese Taipei	1–14	—	1–7	0–12	2–7	0–8	0–12	0–6
4	Czech Republic	2–8	7–1	—	3–9	7–3	8–6	1–8	3–3
3	Latvia	6–11	12–0	9–3	—	6–4	8–3	4–7	4–2
5	Romania	0–9	7–2	3–7	4–6	—	8–3	2–9	2–4
6	Slovenia	0–12	8–0	6–8	3–8	3–8	—	1–11	1–5
2	Sweden	0–7	12–0	8–1	7–4	9–2	11–1	—	5–1

Group C Round Robin Summary Table
Pos.	Country	Australia	Austria	England	Hungary	Switzerland	United States	Record
3	Australia	—	5–1	2–5	8–7	2–6	4–8	2–3
5	Austria	1–5	—	5–2	2–7	2–12	4–12	1–4
6	England	5–2	2–5	—	5–6	2–8	1–11	1–4
4	Hungary	7–8	7–2	6–5	—	2–12	4–11	2–3
2	Switzerland	6–2	12–2	8–2	12–2	—	5–11	4–1
1	United States	8–4	12–4	11–1	11–4	11–5	—	5–0

=== Round robin results ===
All draw times are listed in Eastern European Time (UTC+02:00).

==== Draw 1 ====
Monday, December 15, 9:00

Sheet A	1	2	3	4	5	6	7	8	Final
Turkey (Zenit)	1	3	2	0	5	1	0	X	12
Philippines (Skaggs) 🔨	0	0	0	1	0	0	3	X	4

Sheet B	1	2	3	4	5	6	7	8	Final
United States (Hebert)	0	4	0	4	0	3	X	X	11
Hungary (Karpati) 🔨	1	0	2	0	1	0	X	X	4

Sheet C	1	2	3	4	5	6	7	8	Final
Germany (Angrick) 🔨	0	2	0	3	0	3	0	X	8
New Zealand (Nevill)	0	0	2	0	1	0	1	X	4

Sheet D	1	2	3	4	5	6	7	8	Final
Switzerland (Lüthold)	0	5	4	2	1	0	X	X	12
Austria (Kramlinger) 🔨	1	0	0	0	0	1	X	X	2

Sheet E	1	2	3	4	5	6	7	8	Final
Romania (Ghergie) 🔨	2	1	0	2	0	2	X	X	7
Chinese Taipei (Chen)	0	0	1	0	1	0	X	X	2

==== Draw 2 ====
Monday, December 15, 14:00

Sheet B	1	2	3	4	5	6	7	8	Final
Czech Republic (Bláha) 🔨	0	4	0	2	0	2	0	X	8
Slovenia (Krapez)	1	0	2	0	1	0	2	X	6

Sheet D	1	2	3	4	5	6	7	8	Final
China (Liu)	0	2	1	0	1	0	2	5	11
Latvia (Zass) 🔨	2	0	0	1	0	3	0	0	6

Sheet E	1	2	3	4	5	6	7	8	Final
Australia (Bence)	0	1	0	0	0	1	0	X	2
England (Waring) 🔨	1	0	0	1	2	0	1	X	5

==== Draw 3 ====
Monday, December 15, 19:00

Sheet A	1	2	3	4	5	6	7	8	Final
Chinese Taipei (Chen)	0	0	0	0	0	0	X	X	0
Sweden (Nygren) 🔨	2	3	3	3	0	1	X	X	12

Sheet B	1	2	3	4	5	6	7	8	9	Final
Spain (Saez) 🔨	1	0	0	3	0	0	0	0	2	6
Slovakia (Trajanov)	0	0	0	0	1	1	1	1	0	4

Sheet D	1	2	3	4	5	6	7	8	Final
Germany (Angrick) 🔨	0	0	2	0	2	2	1	X	7
Turkey (Zenit)	0	1	0	1	0	0	0	X	2

Sheet E	1	2	3	4	5	6	7	8	Final
Philippines (Skaggs)	1	0	0	0	0	0	0	X	1
Poland (Rokita) 🔨	0	2	0	0	1	0	1	X	4

==== Draw 4 ====
Tuesday, December 16, 9:00

Sheet A	1	2	3	4	5	6	7	8	Final
Poland (Rokita) 🔨	3	0	4	1	0	0	X	X	8
Slovakia (Trajanov)	0	1	0	0	0	0	X	X	1

Sheet C	1	2	3	4	5	6	7	8	Final
Slovenia (Krapez) 🔨	1	2	1	1	1	2	X	X	8
Chinese Taipei (Chen)	0	0	0	0	0	0	X	X	0

Sheet E	1	2	3	4	5	6	7	8	Final
Turkey (Zenit) 🔨	3	1	1	1	4	1	X	X	11
Spain (Saez)	0	0	0	0	0	0	X	X	0

==== Draw 5 ====
Tuesday, December 16, 14:00

Sheet A	1	2	3	4	5	6	7	8	Final
England (Waring)	0	0	1	0	1	0	0	X	2
Switzerland (Lüthold) 🔨	0	2	0	2	0	2	2	X	8

Sheet B	1	2	3	4	5	6	7	8	Final
Latvia (Zass) 🔨	4	0	1	0	0	1	0	X	6
Romania (Ghergie)	0	1	0	1	1	0	1	X	4

Sheet C	1	2	3	4	5	6	7	8	9	Final
Hungary (Karpati)	1	1	0	1	2	0	2	0	0	7
Australia (Bence) 🔨	0	0	5	0	0	1	0	1	1	8

Sheet D	1	2	3	4	5	6	7	8	Final
Sweden (Nygren)	0	1	1	2	0	4	X	X	8
Czech Republic (Bláha) 🔨	0	0	0	0	1	0	X	X	1

Sheet E	1	2	3	4	5	6	7	8	Final
Austria (Kramlinger)	1	0	0	1	0	2	X	X	4
United States (Hebert) 🔨	0	5	3	0	4	0	X	X	12

==== Draw 6 ====
Tuesday, December 16, 19:00

Sheet B	1	2	3	4	5	6	7	8	9	Final
New Zealand (Nevill)	0	0	0	1	0	2	1	1	0	5
Turkey (Zenit) 🔨	0	1	3	0	1	0	0	0	1	6

Sheet C	1	2	3	4	5	6	7	8	Final
Spain (Saez)	1	0	1	0	1	0	X	X	3
Poland (Rokita) 🔨	0	6	0	3	0	2	X	X	11

Sheet E	1	2	3	4	5	6	7	8	Final
Slovakia (Trajanov)	0	0	0	1	0	1	X	X	2
Germany (Angrick) 🔨	2	3	1	0	1	0	X	X	7

==== Draw 7 ====
Wednesday, December 17, 9:00

Sheet A	1	2	3	4	5	6	7	8	Final
New Zealand (Nevill)	0	0	3	1	0	0	1	X	5
Spain (Saez) 🔨	1	1	0	0	3	1	0	X	6

Sheet B	1	2	3	4	5	6	7	8	Final
China (Liu) 🔨	0	2	1	0	1	2	1	X	7
Sweden (Nygren)	0	0	0	0	0	0	0	X	0

Sheet C	1	2	3	4	5	6	7	8	Final
Philippines (Skaggs) 🔨	2	0	0	3	0	1	2	X	8
Slovakia (Trajanov)	0	0	1	0	2	0	0	X	3

Sheet D	1	2	3	4	5	6	7	8	Final
Latvia (Zass) 🔨	4	2	2	2	1	1	X	X	12
Chinese Taipei (Chen)	0	0	0	0	0	0	X	X	0

==== Draw 8 ====
Wednesday, December 17, 14:00

Sheet A	1	2	3	4	5	6	7	8	Final
United States (Hebert) 🔨	3	0	3	0	2	0	X	X	8
Australia (Bence)	0	1	0	2	0	1	X	X	4

Sheet B	1	2	3	4	5	6	7	8	Final
Turkey (Zenit) 🔨	1	0	2	0	0	1	1	1	6
Poland (Rokita)	0	0	0	2	2	0	0	0	4

Sheet C	1	2	3	4	5	6	7	8	Final
Romania (Ghergie) 🔨	1	0	1	1	0	0	0	X	3
Czech Republic (Bláha)	0	2	0	0	3	1	1	X	7

Sheet E	1	2	3	4	5	6	7	8	Final
Switzerland (Lüthold) 🔨	5	0	4	1	0	2	X	X	12
Hungary (Karpati)	0	0	0	0	2	0	X	X	2

==== Draw 9 ====
Wednesday, December 17, 19:00

Sheet A	1	2	3	4	5	6	7	8	Final
Spain (Saez)	0	0	0	0	0	1	X	X	1
Germany (Angrick) 🔨	0	2	2	0	3	0	X	X	7

Sheet B	1	2	3	4	5	6	7	8	Final
Austria (Kramlinger) 🔨	1	0	0	0	2	1	1	X	5
England (Waring)	0	0	2	0	0	0	0	X	2

Sheet C	1	2	3	4	5	6	7	8	Final
Chinese Taipei (Chen)	0	0	0	0	0	1	X	X	1
China (Liu) 🔨	3	2	6	1	2	0	X	X	14

Sheet D	1	2	3	4	5	6	7	8	Final
Slovakia (Trajanov)	0	0	0	2	0	1	2	0	5
New Zealand (Nevill) 🔨	3	1	0	0	1	0	0	1	6

Sheet E	1	2	3	4	5	6	7	8	Final
Slovenia (Krapez)	0	0	0	0	1	0	0	X	1
Sweden (Nygren) 🔨	2	2	2	3	0	1	1	X	11

==== Draw 10 ====
Thursday, December 18, 9:00

Sheet A	1	2	3	4	5	6	7	8	Final
Czech Republic (Bláha)	0	0	1	0	1	0	X	X	2
China (Liu) 🔨	3	1	0	1	0	3	X	X	8

Sheet B	1	2	3	4	5	6	7	8	Final
Germany (Angrick) 🔨	1	0	0	1	0	2	0	1	5
Philippines (Skaggs)	0	0	0	0	1	0	2	0	3

Sheet C	1	2	3	4	5	6	7	8	Final
Sweden (Nygren)	2	0	2	0	2	0	0	1	7
Latvia (Zass) 🔨	0	1	0	1	0	1	1	0	4

Sheet D	1	2	3	4	5	6	7	8	Final
Romania (Ghergie) 🔨	3	0	0	2	0	2	1	X	8
Slovenia (Krapez)	0	1	1	0	1	0	0	X	3

==== Draw 11 ====
Thursday, December 18, 14:00

Sheet A	1	2	3	4	5	6	7	8	Final
Hungary (Karpati)	0	2	1	0	2	1	1	X	7
Austria (Kramlinger) 🔨	1	0	0	1	0	0	0	X	2

Sheet C	1	2	3	4	5	6	7	8	Final
England (Waring)	0	0	0	0	0	1	X	X	1
United States (Hebert) 🔨	1	2	3	3	2	0	X	X	11

Sheet D	1	2	3	4	5	6	7	8	Final
Australia (Bence) 🔨	0	1	0	0	0	1	0	X	2
Switzerland (Lüthold)	1	0	1	2	1	0	1	X	6

Sheet E	1	2	3	4	5	6	7	8	Final
Poland (Rokita) 🔨	1	0	1	0	2	0	3	X	7
New Zealand (Nevill)	0	1	0	1	0	3	0	X	5

==== Draw 12 ====
Thursday, December 18, 19:00

Sheet A	1	2	3	4	5	6	7	8	Final
Latvia (Zass)	0	1	0	3	1	3	0	X	8
Slovenia (Krapez) 🔨	1	0	1	0	0	0	1	X	3

Sheet B	1	2	3	4	5	6	7	8	Final
Chinese Taipei (Chen)	0	0	0	0	0	1	X	X	1
Czech Republic (Bláha) 🔨	0	2	1	1	3	0	X	X	7

Sheet C	1	2	3	4	5	6	7	8	Final
Slovakia (Trajanov)	0	1	0	2	0	0	X	X	3
Turkey (Zenit) 🔨	1	0	4	0	2	1	X	X	8

Sheet D	1	2	3	4	5	6	7	8	Final
Philippines (Skaggs)	0	0	0	0	3	0	0	1	4
Spain (Saez) 🔨	0	0	2	0	0	1	0	0	3

Sheet E	1	2	3	4	5	6	7	8	Final
China (Liu)	3	1	1	1	1	2	X	X	9
Romania (Ghergie) 🔨	0	0	0	0	0	0	X	X	0

==== Draw 13 ====
Friday, December 19, 8:00

Sheet B	1	2	3	4	5	6	7	8	Final
Switzerland (Lüthold)	0	2	0	2	0	1	X	X	5
United States (Hebert) 🔨	2	0	4	0	5	0	X	X	11

Sheet C	1	2	3	4	5	6	7	8	Final
Australia (Bence) 🔨	1	0	0	0	2	1	1	X	5
Austria (Kramlinger)	0	1	0	0	0	0	0	X	1

Sheet D	1	2	3	4	5	6	7	8	Final
England (Waring)	0	0	3	0	1	0	0	1	5
Hungary (Karpati) 🔨	0	1	0	1	0	3	1	0	6

==== Draw 14 ====
Friday, December 19, 12:00

Sheet A	1	2	3	4	5	6	7	8	Final
Sweden (Nygren) 🔨	2	2	2	0	2	1	X	X	9
Romania (Ghergie)	0	0	0	2	0	0	X	X	2

Sheet B	1	2	3	4	5	6	7	8	Final
Slovenia (Krapez) 🔨	0	0	0	0	0	0	X	X	0
China (Liu)	4	2	1	2	1	2	X	X	12

Sheet C	1	2	3	4	5	6	7	8	9	Final
New Zealand (Nevill) 🔨	1	2	0	1	0	0	0	2	1	7
Philippines (Skaggs)	0	0	3	0	0	0	3	0	0	6

Sheet D	1	2	3	4	5	6	7	8	Final
Poland (Rokita)	0	0	1	2	1	0	0	1	5
Germany (Angrick) 🔨	0	1	0	0	0	1	1	0	3

Sheet E	1	2	3	4	5	6	7	8	Final
Czech Republic (Bláha) 🔨	0	0	1	0	2	0	0	X	3
Latvia (Zass)	3	2	0	1	0	1	2	X	9

=== Playoffs ===
Quarterfinals
1	United States	8
8	Australia	1
4	Poland	3
5	Sweden	2
2	Germany	3
7	Latvia	6
3	China	4
6	Switzerland	6

Semifinals
1	United States	10
4	Poland	2
7	Latvia	3
6	Switzerland	5

Gold medal game
1	United States	5
6	Switzerland	2
Third place
4	Poland	11
7	Latvia	4

==== Quarterfinals ====
Friday, December 19, 19:00

Sheet A	1	2	3	4	5	6	7	8	9	Final
China (Liu) 🔨	0	1	0	0	1	0	2	0	0	4
Switzerland (Lüthold)	0	0	1	0	0	3	0	0	2	6

Sheet B	1	2	3	4	5	6	7	8	Final
Germany (Angrick) 🔨	0	1	0	0	2	0	0	0	3
Latvia (Zass)	0	0	2	0	0	0	2	2	6

Sheet C	1	2	3	4	5	6	7	8	Final
Australia (Bence)	0	0	0	0	1	0	0	X	1
United States (Hebert) 🔨	2	0	2	1	0	2	1	X	8

Sheet D	1	2	3	4	5	6	7	8	Final
Sweden (Nygren)	0	0	1	0	0	0	1	0	2
Poland (Rokita) 🔨	0	1	0	1	0	0	0	1	3

==== Semifinals ====
Saturday, December 20, 10:00

Sheet A	1	2	3	4	5	6	7	8	Final
United States (Hebert) 🔨	4	1	4	0	1	0	X	X	10
Poland (Rokita)	0	0	0	1	0	1	X	X	2

Sheet D	1	2	3	4	5	6	7	8	Final
Switzerland (Lüthold) 🔨	1	1	0	0	2	0	1	X	5
Latvia (Zass)	0	0	0	2	0	1	0	X	3

==== Bronze medal game ====
Saturday, December 20, 16:00

Sheet B	1	2	3	4	5	6	7	8	Final
Poland (Rokita) 🔨	3	0	1	0	3	0	4	X	11
Latvia (Zass)	0	1	0	2	0	1	0	X	4

==== Gold medal game ====
Saturday, December 20, 16:00

Sheet C	1	2	3	4	5	6	7	8	Final
United States (Hebert) 🔨	2	0	1	2	0	0	X	X	5
Switzerland (Lüthold)	0	0	0	0	1	1	X	X	2

=== Final standings ===
Key
Teams Advance to the 2026 World Junior Curling Championships

Place	Team
1st place, gold medalist(s)	United States
2nd place, silver medalist(s)	Switzerland
3rd place, bronze medalist(s)	Poland
4	Latvia
5	Australia
5	China
5	Germany
5	Sweden
9	Turkey
10	Czech Republic
11	Hungary
12	Philippines
13	Romania
14	New Zealand
15	Austria
16	England
17	Slovenia
18	Spain
19	Slovakia
20	Chinese Taipei

== Women ==
=== Teams ===
The teams are listed as follows:

Australia	Brazil	Chinese Taipei	Czech Republic	England
Skip: Holly Douglas; Third: Molly Baker; Second: Chiara Nathan; Lead: Brydie Douglas; Alternate: Marcy Forge	Skip: Julia Gentile; Third: Melissa Sampaio; Second: Ana Teodoro; Lead: Rafaela Ladeira	Fourth/Vice: Lin Yi-Ling; Third/Skip: Chuang Yen-En; Second: Yu Ssu-Chieh; Lead: Lu Ai-Lun; Alternate: Hung Yu-Han	Skip: Kristýna Farková; Third: Sofie Krupičková; Second: Ema Košáková; Lead: Stella Svitáková; Alternate: Matylda Volfová	Fourth: Lina Opel; Skip: Marianna Ward; Second: Anna MacDougall; Lead: Helena Kiggell; Alternate: Chloe McNaughton
Estonia	Finland	Hong Kong	Hungary	Italy
Skip: Hettel Weddro; Third: Elisabeth Tammer; Second: Saara Sofia Carson; Lead: Lola Soomer	Skip: Lara Sajaniemi; Third: Elaina Sajaniemi; Second: Maria Olszewska; Lead: Ida Kokkonen	Skip: Cheng Heung Kiu; Third: Leung Chi Hei; Second: Cheung Hong Kiu; Lead: Yuen Chin Yau; Alternate: Wong Sum Yau	Skip: Emma Szurmay; Third: Dorina Dencso; Second: Panna Barna; Lead: Fruzsina Mate; Alternate: Boglarka Toszegi	Skip: Rebecca Mariani; Third: Rachele Scalesse; Second: Letizia Gaia Carlisano; Lead: Giada Zambelli; Alternate: Allegra Grande
Japan	Latvia	Lithuania	New Zealand	Norway
Skip: Yuina Miura; Third: Kohane Tsuruga; Second: Rin Suzuki; Lead: Hana Ikeda; Alternate: Aone Nakamura	Skip: Agate Regža; Third: Darta Regža; Second: Viktorija Scepavica; Lead: Adriana Mieze; Alternate: Anastasija Gorovenko	Skip: Miglė Kiudytė; Third: Nika Shilova; Second: Urte Venslaviciute; Lead: Meda Kiudyte	Skip: Tahlia Petersen; Third: Ellie McKenzie; Second: Olivia Russell; Lead: Tylah James; Alternate: Trinity Cowie	Skip: Andrine Rønning; Third: Sylvi Hausstætter; Second: Lydia Hågensen; Lead: Hedvig Hågensen
Poland	Romania	Scotland	Slovenia	Spain
Skip: Magdalena Herman; Third: Paulina Frysz; Second: Malgorzata Frysz; Lead: Klaudia Wajda	Fourth: Ania Bacali; Skip: Ambra Paslaru; Second: Sorana Pop; Lead: Elisa Guttman	Skip: Katie Archibald; Third: Alex McMillan; Second: Hannah Young; Lead: Lillia Clarke; Alternate: Cara Thomson	Skip: Ema Kavčič; Third: Pavla Kavčič; Second: Neža Brina Gmajnar; Lead: Lana Zaveljcina	Skip: Leyre Torralba; Third: Paula Olivan; Second: Elena Torralba; Lead: Laura Rodríguez; Alternate: Izaro Saez
Turkey	United States			
Skip: Melisa Cömert; Third: Derya Ekmekci; Second: Suheda Karacali; Lead: Şeydanur Morkoç; Alternate: Zeynep Genç	Skip: Allory Johnson; Third: Gianna Johnson; Second: Morgan Zacher; Lead: Bailey Vaydich; Alternate: Ella Wendling			

=== Round robin standings ===
Final Round Robin Standings

Key
Teams to Playoffs

Group A	Skip	W	L	W–L	DSC
Japan	Yuina Miura	7	0	–	74.940
Italy	Rebecca Mariani	5	2	1–0	62.320
Turkey	Melisa Cömert	5	2	0–1	78.400
New Zealand	Tahlia Petersen	3	4	–	71.220
Romania	Ambra Paslaru	2	5	2–1; 1–0	112.580
Australia	Holly Douglas	2	5	2–1; 0–1	61.610
England	Marianna Ward	2	5	1–2; 1–0	103.540
Estonia	Hettel Weddro	2	5	1–2; 0–1	121.080

Group B	Skip	W	L	W–L	DSC
Norway	Andrine Rønning	5	1	1–0	47.580
United States	Allory Johnson	5	1	0–1	17.310
Lithuania	Miglė Kiudytė	4	2	–	94.000
Hungary	Emma Szurmay	3	3	1–0	116.660
Poland	Magdalena Herman	3	3	0–1	115.180
Slovenia	Ema Kavčič	1	5	–	92.330
Chinese Taipei	Yu Ssu-Chieh	0	6	–	165.520

Group C	Skip	W	L	W–L	DSC
Scotland	Katie Archibald	5	1	1–0	102.520
Latvia	Agate Regža	5	1	0–1	46.420
Spain	Leyre Torralba	4	2	1–0	53.030
Czech Republic	Kristýna Farková	4	2	0–1	73.790
Brazil	Julia Gentile	2	4	–	78.070
Hong Kong	Cheng Heung Kiu	1	5	–	84.330
Finland	Lara Sajaniemi	0	6	–	116.780

Ranking of 3rd Place Teams	Skip	Group	DSC
Spain	Leyre Torralba	C	53.030
Turkey	Melisa Cömert	A	78.400
Lithuania	Miglė Kiudytė	B	94.000

Group A Round Robin Summary Table
Pos.	Country	Australia	England	Estonia	Italy	Japan	New Zealand	Romania	Turkey	Record
6	Australia	—	9–7	9–7	1–10	1–13	2–11	2–9	3–8	2–5
7	England	7–9	—	10–4	9–5	4–8	4–10	5–10	5–6	2–5
8	Estonia	7–9	4–10	—	3–8	2–7	7–6	9–2	4–9	2–5
2	Italy	10–1	5–9	8–3	—	4–7	4–3	8–2	7–3	5–1
1	Japan	13–1	8–4	7–2	7–4	—	7–3	9–2	7–3	7–0
4	New Zealand	11–2	10–4	6–7	3–4	3–7	—	7–4	4–6	3–4
5	Romania	9–2	10–5	2–9	2–8	2–9	4–7	—	1–13	2–5
3	Turkey	8–3	6–5	9–4	3–7	3–7	6–4	13–1	—	5–2

Group B Round Robin Summary Table
Pos.	Country	Chinese Taipei	Hungary	Lithuania	Norway	Poland	Slovenia	United States	Record
7	Chinese Taipei	—	1–16	1–10	1–15	2–9	4–11	1–11	0–6
4	Hungary	16–1	—	5–7	1–7	8–5	11–3	1–9	3–3
3	Lithuania	10–1	7–5	—	3–14	10–2	6–4	2–11	4–2
1	Norway	15–1	7–1	14–3	—	4–9	6–4	7–6	5–1
5	Poland	9–2	5–8	2–10	9–4	—	8–1	5–7	3–3
6	Slovenia	11–4	3–11	4–6	4–6	1–8	—	2–11	1–5
2	United States	11–1	9–1	11–2	6–7	7–5	11–2	—	5–1

Group C Round Robin Summary Table
Pos.	Country	Brazil	Czech Republic	Finland	Hong Kong	Latvia	Scotland	Spain	Record
5	Brazil	—	3–5	7–5	11–9	5–8	3–10	1–7	2–4
4	Czech Republic	5–3	—	15–2	16–2	2–6	8–5	2–5	4–2
7	Finland	5–7	2–15	—	3–6	3–6	3–8	1–10	0–6
6	Hong Kong	9–11	2–16	6–3	—	2–11	1–11	5–8	1–5
2	Latvia	8–5	6–2	6–3	11–2	—	5–9	8–7	5–1
1	Scotland	10–3	5–8	8–3	11–1	9–5	—	8–3	5–1
3	Spain	7–1	5–2	10–1	8–5	7–8	3–8	—	4–2

=== Round robin results ===
All draw times are listed in Eastern European Time (UTC+02:00).

==== Draw 1 ====
Sunday, December 7, 9:00

Sheet B	1	2	3	4	5	6	7	8	Final
Czech Republic (Farková)	0	0	0	0	1	0	1	0	2
Latvia (Regža) 🔨	1	0	1	0	0	1	0	3	6

Sheet C	1	2	3	4	5	6	7	8	Final
Hungary (Szurmay)	0	0	0	0	1	0	X	X	1
United States (Johnson) 🔨	2	1	2	2	0	2	X	X	9

Sheet D	1	2	3	4	5	6	7	8	Final
Scotland (Archibald)	0	0	4	3	0	1	X	X	8
Spain (Torralba) 🔨	0	2	0	0	1	0	X	X	3

Sheet E	1	2	3	4	5	6	7	8	Final
Norway (Rønning) 🔨	1	2	0	4	0	1	6	X	14
Lithuania (Kiudytė)	0	0	1	0	2	0	0	X	3

==== Draw 2 ====
Sunday, December 7, 14:00

Sheet A	1	2	3	4	5	6	7	8	Final
England (Ward)	0	0	0	4	3	2	1	X	10
Estonia (Weddro) 🔨	1	2	1	0	0	0	0	X	4

Sheet C	1	2	3	4	5	6	7	8	Final
New Zealand (Petersen) 🔨	0	0	0	1	0	0	2	X	3
Japan (Miura)	1	1	2	0	2	1	0	X	7

Sheet D	1	2	3	4	5	6	7	8	Final
Romania (Paslaru) 🔨	0	1	0	0	0	0	X	X	1
Turkey (Cömert)	4	0	3	0	3	3	X	X	13

Sheet E	1	2	3	4	5	6	7	8	Final
Italy (Mariani) 🔨	2	2	4	1	0	1	X	X	10
Australia (Douglas)	0	0	0	0	1	0	X	X	1

==== Draw 3 ====
Sunday, December 7, 19:00

Sheet A	1	2	3	4	5	6	7	8	Final
Lithuania (Kiudytė) 🔨	0	2	1	0	1	1	1	X	6
Slovenia (Kavčič)	3	0	0	1	0	0	0	X	4

Sheet B	1	2	3	4	5	6	7	8	Final
Spain (Torralba) 🔨	1	0	1	0	4	1	X	X	7
Brazil (Gentile)	0	0	0	1	0	0	X	X	1

Sheet C	1	2	3	4	5	6	7	8	Final
Latvia (Regža)	2	4	1	0	4	0	X	X	11
Hong Kong (Cheng) 🔨	0	0	0	1	0	1	X	X	2

Sheet D	1	2	3	4	5	6	7	8	Final
Finland (Sajaniemi)	0	0	1	0	1	0	X	X	2
Czech Republic (Farková) 🔨	5	2	0	4	0	4	X	X	15

Sheet E	1	2	3	4	5	6	7	8	Final
Poland (Herman) 🔨	0	1	0	3	3	2	X	X	9
Chinese Taipei (Yu)	1	0	1	0	0	0	X	X	2

==== Draw 4 ====
Monday, December 8, 9:00

Sheet A	1	2	3	4	5	6	7	8	Final
Hong Kong (Cheng) 🔨	1	2	0	0	1	1	0	1	6
Finland (Sajaniemi)	0	0	1	1	0	0	1	0	3

Sheet B	1	2	3	4	5	6	7	8	Final
New Zealand (Petersen) 🔨	1	0	1	0	1	0	1	0	4
Turkey (Cömert)	0	2	0	1	0	2	0	1	6

Sheet C	1	2	3	4	5	6	7	8	Final
Chinese Taipei (Yu)	0	0	0	1	0	0	X	X	1
Lithuania (Kiudytė) 🔨	5	1	2	0	1	1	X	X	10

Sheet E	1	2	3	4	5	6	7	8	Final
Japan (Miura) 🔨	0	3	1	2	0	3	X	X	9
Romania (Paslaru)	1	0	0	0	1	0	X	X	2

==== Draw 5 ====
Monday, December 8, 14:00

Sheet B	1	2	3	4	5	6	7	8	Final
United States (Johnson) 🔨	2	0	1	0	2	1	0	1	7
Poland (Herman)	0	2	0	2	0	0	1	0	5

Sheet C	1	2	3	4	5	6	7	8	Final
Australia (Douglas) 🔨	0	1	0	3	2	2	0	1	9
England (Ward)	2	0	3	0	0	0	2	0	7

Sheet D	1	2	3	4	5	6	7	8	Final
Italy (Mariani) 🔨	3	0	2	0	2	0	1	X	8
Estonia (Weddro)	0	1	0	1	0	1	0	X	3

Sheet E	1	2	3	4	5	6	7	8	Final
Slovenia (Kavčič) 🔨	0	0	0	2	0	1	0	X	3
Hungary (Szurmay)	3	1	3	0	2	0	2	X	11

==== Draw 6 ====
Monday, December 8, 19:00

Sheet A	1	2	3	4	5	6	7	8	9	Final
Spain (Torralba)	1	1	0	1	0	1	0	3	0	7
Latvia (Regža) 🔨	0	0	2	0	3	0	2	0	1	8

Sheet B	1	2	3	4	5	6	7	8	Final
Hong Kong (Cheng)	0	0	0	2	0	0	X	X	2
Czech Republic (Farková) 🔨	2	3	4	0	5	2	X	X	16

Sheet D	1	2	3	4	5	6	7	8	Final
Norway (Rønning) 🔨	2	2	4	0	3	4	X	X	15
Chinese Taipei (Yu)	0	0	0	1	0	0	X	X	1

Sheet E	1	2	3	4	5	6	7	8	Final
Scotland (Archibald) 🔨	2	0	4	1	0	3	X	X	10
Brazil (Gentile)	0	1	0	0	2	0	X	X	3

==== Draw 7 ====
Tuesday, December 9, 9:00

Sheet A	1	2	3	4	5	6	7	8	Final
Turkey (Cömert) 🔨	3	1	1	1	0	0	2	X	8
Australia (Douglas)	0	0	0	0	1	2	0	X	3

Sheet B	1	2	3	4	5	6	7	8	Final
Romania (Paslaru)	0	1	0	0	1	0	0	X	2
Italy (Mariani) 🔨	1	0	2	1	0	2	2	X	8

Sheet C	1	2	3	4	5	6	7	8	Final
Slovenia (Kavčič)	0	1	0	0	0	0	0	X	1
Poland (Herman) 🔨	3	0	2	1	0	1	1	X	8

Sheet D	1	2	3	4	5	6	7	8	Final
England (Ward)	1	0	0	1	0	1	1	X	4
Japan (Miura) 🔨	0	5	0	0	3	0	0	X	8

Sheet E	1	2	3	4	5	6	7	8	9	Final
Estonia (Weddro)	0	3	0	1	0	1	0	1	1	7
New Zealand (Petersen) 🔨	2	0	2	0	0	0	2	0	0	6

==== Draw 8 ====
Tuesday, December 9, 14:00

Sheet A	1	2	3	4	5	6	7	8	Final
Czech Republic (Farková) 🔨	0	5	0	1	0	2	0	X	8
Scotland (Archibald)	0	0	2	0	2	0	1	X	5

Sheet B	1	2	3	4	5	6	7	8	Final
Hungary (Szurmay)	0	0	0	0	1	0	X	X	1
Norway (Rønning) 🔨	1	0	3	2	0	1	X	X	7

Sheet C	1	2	3	4	5	6	7	8	Final
Finland (Sajaniemi)	0	0	0	0	0	1	X	X	1
Spain (Torralba) 🔨	1	2	2	4	1	0	X	X	10

Sheet D	1	2	3	4	5	6	7	8	Final
Brazil (Gentile) 🔨	0	0	3	0	0	1	0	1	5
Latvia (Regža)	2	1	0	2	2	0	1	0	8

Sheet E	1	2	3	4	5	6	7	8	Final
Lithuania (Kiudytė)	0	0	1	0	1	0	X	X	2
United States (Johnson) 🔨	0	4	0	5	0	2	X	X	11

==== Draw 9 ====
Tuesday, December 9, 19:00

Sheet A	1	2	3	4	5	6	7	8	Final
New Zealand (Petersen)	1	0	1	1	0	4	3	X	10
England (Ward) 🔨	0	2	0	0	2	0	0	X	4

Sheet B	1	2	3	4	5	6	7	8	Final
Japan (Miura) 🔨	0	3	1	3	0	0	X	X	7
Estonia (Weddro)	1	0	0	0	1	0	X	X	2

Sheet C	1	2	3	4	5	6	7	8	Final
Italy (Mariani)	0	3	1	0	2	0	1	X	7
Turkey (Cömert) 🔨	1	0	0	1	0	1	0	X	3

Sheet D	1	2	3	4	5	6	7	8	Final
Australia (Douglas)	0	1	1	0	0	0	X	X	2
Romania (Paslaru) 🔨	1	0	0	4	3	1	X	X	9

==== Draw 10 ====
Wednesday, December 10, 9:00

Sheet A	1	2	3	4	5	6	7	8	Final
United States (Johnson) 🔨	2	2	1	0	5	1	X	X	11
Chinese Taipei (Yu)	0	0	0	1	0	0	X	X	1

Sheet B	1	2	3	4	5	6	7	8	Final
Scotland (Archibald)	0	0	0	4	2	1	1	X	8
Finland (Sajaniemi) 🔨	1	1	1	0	0	0	0	X	3

Sheet C	1	2	3	4	5	6	7	8	Final
Norway (Rønning) 🔨	3	0	1	0	1	0	1	X	6
Slovenia (Kavčič)	0	1	0	1	0	2	0	X	4

Sheet D	1	2	3	4	5	6	7	8	Final
Hungary (Szurmay)	0	4	0	1	0	0	3	X	8
Poland (Herman) 🔨	1	0	2	0	1	1	0	X	5

Sheet E	1	2	3	4	5	6	7	8	Final
Brazil (Gentile) 🔨	1	5	0	3	1	0	0	1	11
Hong Kong (Cheng)	0	0	3	0	0	4	2	0	9

==== Draw 11 ====
Wednesday, December 10, 14:00

Sheet A	1	2	3	4	5	6	7	8	Final
Estonia (Weddro) 🔨	1	0	1	0	2	0	X	X	4
Turkey (Cömert)	0	3	0	5	0	1	X	X	9

Sheet B	1	2	3	4	5	6	7	8	Final
England (Ward) 🔨	1	3	0	0	1	0	0	X	5
Romania (Paslaru)	0	0	2	2	0	3	3	X	10

Sheet C	1	2	3	4	5	6	7	8	Final
Japan (Miura) 🔨	4	2	0	2	2	3	X	X	13
Australia (Douglas)	0	0	1	0	0	0	X	X	1

Sheet D	1	2	3	4	5	6	7	8	Final
New Zealand (Petersen)	0	0	0	1	0	0	2	0	3
Italy (Mariani) 🔨	0	0	2	0	0	1	0	1	4

==== Draw 12 ====
Wednesday, December 10, 19:00

Sheet A	1	2	3	4	5	6	7	8	Final
Finland (Sajaniemi) 🔨	0	3	1	0	1	0	0	0	5
Brazil (Gentile)	1	0	0	1	0	3	1	1	7

Sheet B	1	2	3	4	5	6	7	8	Final
Latvia (Regža) 🔨	0	1	0	2	1	0	1	0	5
Scotland (Archibald)	1	0	2	0	0	2	0	4	9

Sheet C	1	2	3	4	5	6	7	8	Final
United States (Johnson) 🔨	0	1	0	2	2	1	0	0	6
Norway (Rønning)	1	0	3	0	0	0	2	1	7

Sheet D	1	2	3	4	5	6	7	8	Final
Lithuania (Kiudytė)	0	3	2	0	1	1	0	X	7
Hungary (Szurmay) 🔨	2	0	0	2	0	0	1	X	5

Sheet E	1	2	3	4	5	6	7	8	Final
Czech Republic (Farková)	0	0	0	0	1	0	1	X	2
Spain (Torralba) 🔨	0	0	3	1	0	1	0	X	5

==== Draw 13 ====
Thursday, December 11, 9:00

Sheet A	1	2	3	4	5	6	7	8	Final
Italy (Mariani) 🔨	1	1	0	1	0	0	1	0	4
Japan (Miura)	0	0	3	0	1	2	0	1	7

Sheet B	1	2	3	4	5	6	7	8	Final
Australia (Douglas) 🔨	2	0	0	0	0	0	X	X	2
New Zealand (Petersen)	0	2	2	1	2	4	X	X	11

Sheet C	1	2	3	4	5	6	7	8	Final
Romania (Paslaru)	1	1	0	0	0	0	0	X	2
Estonia (Weddro) 🔨	0	0	1	1	2	1	4	X	9

Sheet E	1	2	3	4	5	6	7	8	9	Final
Turkey (Cömert)	0	1	0	1	1	0	0	2	1	6
England (Ward) 🔨	1	0	2	0	0	1	1	0	0	5

==== Draw 14 ====
Thursday, December 11, 14:00

Sheet A	1	2	3	4	5	6	7	8	Final
Chinese Taipei (Yu)	0	0	0	1	0	0	X	X	1
Hungary (Szurmay) 🔨	2	3	3	0	4	4	X	X	16

Sheet B	1	2	3	4	5	6	7	8	Final
Poland (Herman)	0	0	0	0	1	1	X	X	2
Lithuania (Kiudytė) 🔨	4	2	1	3	0	0	X	X	10

Sheet C	1	2	3	4	5	6	7	8	Final
Hong Kong (Cheng) 🔨	1	0	0	0	0	0	X	X	1
Scotland (Archibald)	0	3	2	3	1	2	X	X	11

Sheet D	1	2	3	4	5	6	7	8	Final
Slovenia (Kavčič)	0	1	0	0	1	0	X	X	2
United States (Johnson) 🔨	2	0	1	3	0	5	X	X	11

Sheet E	1	2	3	4	5	6	7	8	Final
Latvia (Regža) 🔨	1	0	0	1	1	2	0	1	6
Finland (Sajaniemi)	0	1	1	0	0	0	1	0	3

==== Draw 15 ====
Thursday, December 11, 19:00

Sheet A	1	2	3	4	5	6	7	8	Final
Romania (Paslaru) 🔨	2	0	0	0	0	1	1	0	4
New Zealand (Petersen)	0	1	2	1	2	0	0	1	7

Sheet B	1	2	3	4	5	6	7	8	Final
Turkey (Cömert)	0	0	1	0	1	0	1	X	3
Japan (Miura) 🔨	2	2	0	1	0	2	0	X	7

Sheet C	1	2	3	4	5	6	7	8	Final
England (Ward)	1	0	2	0	2	1	2	1	9
Italy (Mariani) 🔨	0	3	0	2	0	0	0	0	5

Sheet D	1	2	3	4	5	6	7	8	9	Final
Estonia (Weddro)	0	2	0	2	0	0	1	2	0	7
Australia (Douglas) 🔨	4	0	1	0	2	0	0	0	2	9

==== Draw 16 ====
Friday, December 12, 10:00

Sheet A	1	2	3	4	5	6	7	8	Final
Poland (Herman)	1	0	4	0	3	0	1	X	9
Norway (Rønning) 🔨	0	2	0	1	0	1	0	X	4

Sheet B	1	2	3	4	5	6	7	8	Final
Chinese Taipei (Yu) 🔨	0	2	0	0	2	0	X	X	4
Slovenia (Kavčič)	1	0	3	3	0	4	X	X	11

Sheet C	1	2	3	4	5	6	7	8	Final
Brazil (Gentile)	0	0	0	1	0	1	1	X	3
Czech Republic (Farková) 🔨	0	0	4	0	1	0	0	X	5

Sheet D	1	2	3	4	5	6	7	8	Final
Spain (Torralba) 🔨	3	0	5	0	0	0	0	X	8
Hong Kong (Cheng)	0	1	0	0	2	1	1	X	5

=== Playoffs ===
Quarterfinals
1	Norway	4
8	Turkey	6
4	United States	10
5	Latvia	2
2	Japan	8
7	Spain	3
3	Scotland	6
6	Italy	5

Semifinals
8	Turkey	4
4	United States	7
2	Japan	8
3	Scotland	4

Gold medal game
4	United States	1
2	Japan	8
Third place
8	Turkey	6
3	Scotland	4

==== Quarterfinals ====
Friday, December 12, 16:00

Sheet A	1	2	3	4	5	6	7	8	Final
Scotland (Archibald) 🔨	1	0	0	3	0	0	1	1	6
Italy (Mariani)	0	1	1	0	1	2	0	0	5

Sheet B	1	2	3	4	5	6	7	8	Final
Japan (Miura) 🔨	2	0	2	0	2	0	2	X	8
Spain (Torralba)	0	1	0	1	0	1	0	X	3

Sheet C	1	2	3	4	5	6	7	8	Final
Norway (Rønning) 🔨	3	0	1	0	0	0	0	X	4
Turkey (Cömert)	0	1	0	1	2	1	1	X	6

Sheet D	1	2	3	4	5	6	7	8	Final
United States (Johnson)	0	1	2	0	5	2	X	X	10
Latvia (Regža) 🔨	1	0	0	1	0	0	X	X	2

==== Semifinals ====
Saturday, December 13, 10:00

Sheet A	1	2	3	4	5	6	7	8	Final
Turkey (Cömert)	0	1	0	2	1	0	0	X	4
United States (Johnson) 🔨	2	0	1	0	0	2	2	X	7

Sheet D	1	2	3	4	5	6	7	8	Final
Japan (Miura)	1	1	0	1	0	3	2	X	8
Scotland (Archibald) 🔨	0	0	1	0	3	0	0	X	4

==== Bronze medal game ====
Saturday, December 13, 16:00

Sheet B	1	2	3	4	5	6	7	8	Final
Turkey (Cömert)	0	1	2	0	1	1	0	1	6
Scotland (Archibald) 🔨	0	0	0	1	0	0	3	0	4

==== Gold medal game ====
Saturday, December 13, 16:00

Sheet C	1	2	3	4	5	6	7	8	Final
United States (Johnson)	0	0	0	1	0	0	X	X	1
Japan (Miura) 🔨	2	3	1	0	1	1	X	X	8

=== Final standings ===
Key
Teams Advance to the 2026 World Junior Curling Championships

Place	Team
1st place, gold medalist(s)	Japan
2nd place, silver medalist(s)	United States
3rd place, bronze medalist(s)	Turkey
4	Scotland
5	Norway
5	Latvia
5	Italy
5	Spain
9	Lithuania
10	New Zealand
11	Czech Republic
12	Hungary
13	Brazil
14	Romania
15	Poland
16	Australia
17	Hong Kong
18	Slovenia
19	England
20	Finland
21	Chinese Taipei
22	Estonia
