= Stefano Spiller =

Italian curler (born 2005)

- Curler
- Born: 3 July 2005 (age 21)

Team
- Curling club: Unione Sportiva Bormiese ASD, Bormio
- Skip: Stefano Spiller
- Third: Amos Mosaner
- Second: Sebastiano Arman
- Lead: Cesare Spiller

Curling career
- Member Association: Italy
- World Championship: 1 (2026)
- European Championship: 1 (2026)
Medal record
Men's curling
Representing Italy
European Championships
Silver medal – second place	2026 Ostrava
World Junior Championships
Gold medal – first place	2025 Cortina d'Ampezzo
Silver medal – second place	2026 Tårnby
World Junior Mixed Doubles Championships
Gold medal – first place	2025 Edmonton
Representing Province of Sondrio
Italian Men's Curling Championship
Gold medal – first place	2026 Bruneck
Silver medal – second place	2025 Cembra
Bronze medal – third place	2024 Trento

Stefano Spiller (born 3 July, 2005) is an Italian curler from Valdidentro. He is a former World Junior Men's and Mixed Doubles Champion.

== Career ==
=== Juniors ===
Spiller competed at the 2025 Winter World University Games as the alternate for the Italian team (skipped by Giacomo Colli). The team finished 5–4.

Spiller, and his team of brothers Stefano and Andrea Gilli, and lead Francesco Vigliani represented Italy at the 2025 World Junior Curling Championships, played at home in Cortina d'Ampezzo, Italy. With Spiller skipping, the team finished the round robin with an 8–1 record, in first place. The team then beat South Korea's Kim Dae-hyun rink in the semifinals, before beating Norway's Lukas Høstmælingen in the final to claim the gold medal, the first World Junior men's title for Italy.

The following month, Spiller and partner Lucrezia Grande represented Italy at the 2025 World Junior Mixed Doubles Curling Championship, the first time the event had been held. The pair went undefeated in pool play, with a 6–0 record. They then beat the United States, South Korean and finally Denmark (Katrine and Jacob Schmidt) in the final, to win his second junior gold medal in as many months.

Spiller skipped the Italian team once again at the 2026 World Junior Curling Championships, this time with new lead Cesare Spiller, Stefano's twin brother. There, the team had a weaker round robin, finishing with a 6–3 record. The team then upset Scotland's Orrin Carson rink in the semifinal, before losing to the United States' Caden Hebert in the final.

=== Men's ===
Spiller's junior rink also competed on the men's tour during the 2025–26 curling season, where they won the Danish Open and the Sun City Cup.

Only a few weeks after winning the World Junior silver medal, Spiller was chosen to skip the Italian men's team at the 2026 World Men's Curling Championship, following the decision of longtime skip Joël Retornaz to miss the tournament. There, they would finish the round robin with an 8–4 record, qualifying for the playoffs where they would lose 9–7 against Canada's Matt Dunstone, finishing in 5th place.

== Grand Slam record ==
Key
C	Champion
F	Lost in Final
SF	Lost in Semifinal
QF	Lost in Quarterfinals
R16	Lost in the round of 16
Q	Did not advance to playoffs
T2	Played in Tier 2 event
DNP	Did not participate in event
N/A	Not a Grand Slam event that season

Event	2026–27
Masters	Q
National	QF
Open	
