= Vilma Åhlström =

Swedish curler

- Curler ♀
- Born: 10 November 2000 (age 26)

Team
- Curling club: Härnösands CK, Härnösand

Curling career
- Member Association: Sweden
- Other appearances: World Mixed Championship: 1 (2019)
Medal record
Curling
Swedish Mixed Championship
Gold medal – first place	2019

Vilma Åhlström (born 10 November 2000) is a Swedish female curler.

She is a 2019 Swedish mixed curling champion and played at the 2019 World Mixed Curling Championship.

== Teams ==
=== Women's ===
Season	Skip	Third	Second	Lead	Events
2015–16	Lisa Norrlander	Vilma Åhlström	Linda Stenlund	Kajsa Olaisson	
2017–18	Lisa Norrlander	Vilma Åhlström	Linda Stenlund	Kajsa Olaisson	
2018–19	Cecilia Fransson	Linnéa Svedberg	Vilma Åhlström	Jenny Jonasson	SJCC 2019 (4th); SWCC 2019 (5th)
2019–20	Cecilia Fransson	Linnéa Svedberg	Vilma Åhlström	Jenny Jonasson	

=== Mixed ===
Season	Skip	Third	Second	Lead	Alternate	Coach	Events
2018–19	Simon Olofsson	Vilma Åhlström	Axel Sjöberg	Linda Stenlund	Hannes Lindquist	Hannes Lindquist	SMxCC 2019 (gold)
2019–20	Simon Olofsson	Vilma Åhlström	Axel Sjöberg	Linda Stenlund		Mathias Mabergs	WMxCC 2019 (9th)

=== Mixed doubles ===
Season	Male	Female
2019–20	Arvid Norin	Vilma Åhlström
