= Erika Jonsson =

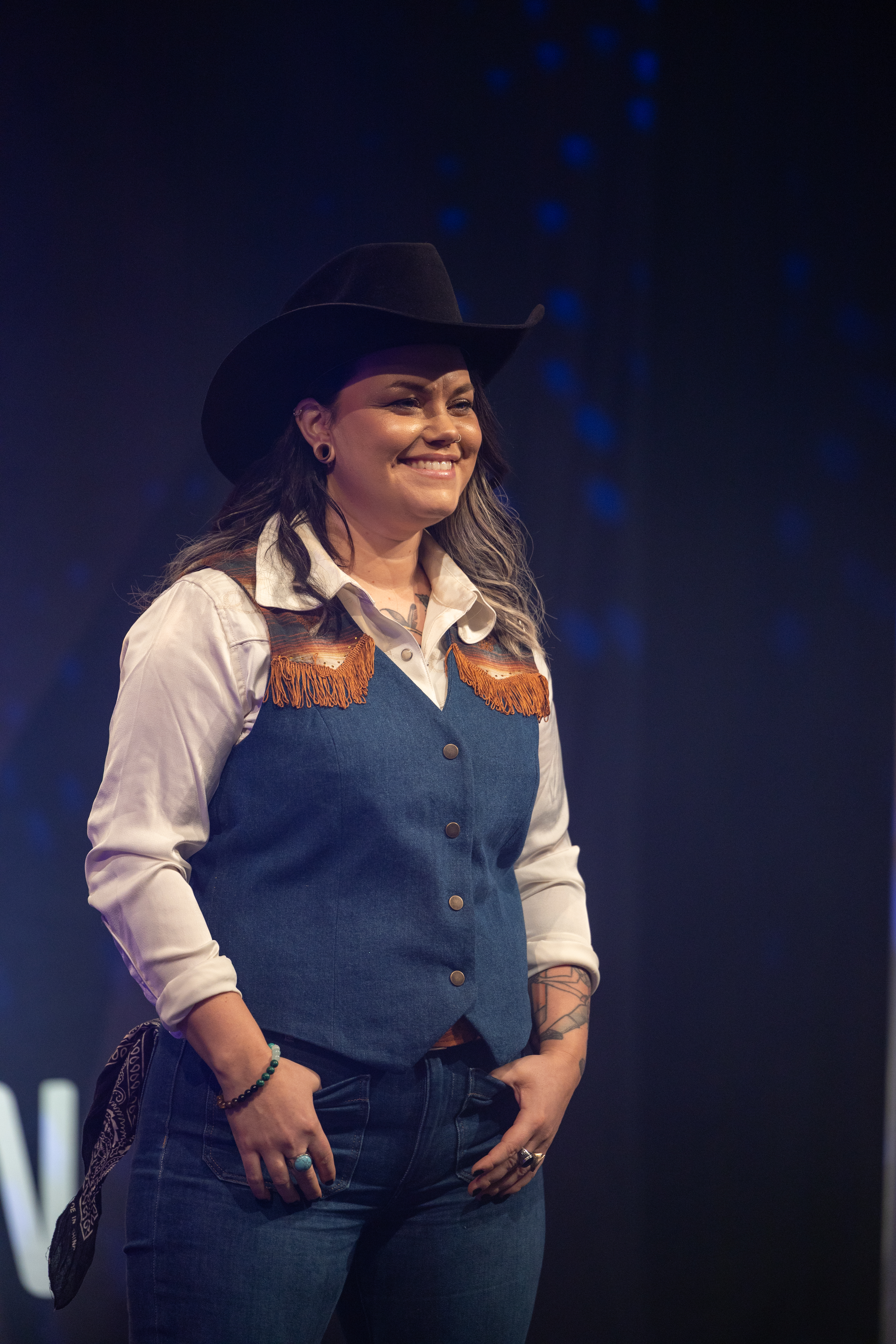
- Erika Jonsson in 2025

Background information
- Born: Lena Erika Jonsson; 9 March 1991 (age 35); Kil, Sweden
- Occupation: Singer

Lena Erika Jonsson (born 9 March 1991) is a Swedish singer. She debuted in 2015 with the release of the single ”Sången om Värmland”.

Erika Jonsson participated in Melodifestivalen 2026 with the song "Från landet".

== Discography ==
=== Singles ===
Title	Year	Peak chart positions	Album
Title	Year	SWE	Album
"Från landet"	2026	47	Non-album single
