= 2025 World Junior Curling Championships =

Curling tournament in Italy

- Host city: Cortina d’Ampezzo, Italy
- Arena: Cortina Curling Olympic Stadium
- Dates: April 12–21
- Men's winner: Italy
- Curling club: Curling Pinerolo, Pinerolo
- Skip: Stefano Spiller
- Third: Stefano Gilli
- Second: Andrea Gilli
- Lead: Francesco Vigliani
- Alternate: Cesare Spiller
- Coach: Wolfgang Burba
- Finalist: Norway (Høstmælingen)
- Women's winner: South Korea
- Curling club: Jeonbuk CC, Jeonbuk
- Skip: Kang Bo-bae
- Third: Kim Ji-soo
- Second: Shim Yu-jeong
- Lead: Kim Min-seo
- Alternate: Lee Bo-young
- Coach: Kwon Young-il
- Finalist: Germany (Messenzehl)

The 2025 World Junior Curling Championships were held from April 12 to 21 at the Cortina Curling Olympic Stadium in Cortina d’Ampezzo, Italy. The championship also acted as the test event for curling at the Milano Cortina 2026 Olympic Winter Games.

== Medallists ==
| Junior | Gold | Silver | Bronze |
|---|---|---|---|
| Men | Italy; Stefano Spiller; Stefano Gilli; Andrea Gilli; Francesco Vigliani; Cesare Spiller | Norway; Lukas Høstmælingen; Tinius Haslev Nordbye; Magnus Lillebø; Eskil Eriksen; Harald Dæhlin | Scotland; Orrin Carson; Logan Carson; Archie Hyslop; Charlie Gibb; Jake MacDonald |
| Women | South Korea; Kang Bo-bae; Kim Ji-soo; Shim Yu-jeong; Kim Min-seo; Lee Bo-young | Germany; Kim Sutor (Fourth); Sara Messenzehl (Skip); Joy Sutor; Annelie Abdel-Halim; Emma Waltenberger | Canada; Allyson MacNutt; Maria Fitzgerald; Alison Umlah; Grace McCusker; Cailey Locke |

== Men ==
=== Qualification ===
The following nations qualified to participate in the 2025 World Junior Curling Championship:

| Event | Vacancies | Qualified |
|---|---|---|
| Host Nation | 1 | Italy |
| 2024 World Junior Curling Championships | 6 | Norway; Denmark; United States; Germany; Scotland; Canada |
| 2024 World Junior-B Curling Championships | 3 | South Korea; Switzerland; Japan |
| TOTAL | 10 | |

=== Teams ===
The teams are listed as follows:

| Canada | Denmark | Germany | Italy | Japan |
|---|---|---|---|---|
| The Glencoe Club, Calgary Skip: Kenan Wipf; Third: Ky Macaulay; Second: Michael Keenan; Lead: Max Cinnamon; Alternate: Adam Naugler | Hvidovre CC, Hvidovre Skip: Jacob Schmidt; Third: Alexander Qvist; Second: Kasper Jurlander Bøge; Lead: Liam Goldbeck; Alternate: Nikki Jensen | CC Füssen, Füssen Skip: Lukas Jäger; Third: Leonhard Angrick; Second: Adrian Enders; Lead: Raphael Amberger; Alternate: David Fuss | Curling Pinerolo, Pinerolo Skip: Stefano Spiller; Third: Stefano Gilli; Second: Andrea Gilli; Lead: Francesco Vigliani; Alternate: Cesare Spiller | Tokoro CC, Kitami Skip: Toa Nakahara; Third: Hinata Michitani; Second: Riku Takemura; Lead: Yuta Kimura; Alternate: Shunta Kobayashi |
| Norway | Scotland | South Korea | Switzerland | United States |
| Lillehammer CK, Lillehammer Skip: Lukas Høstmælingen; Third: Tinius Haslev Nordbye; Second: Magnus Lillebø; Lead: Eskil Eriksen; Alternate: Harald Dæhlin | Dumfries CC, Dumfries Skip: Orrin Carson; Third: Logan Carson; Second: Archie Hyslop; Lead: Charlie Gibb; Alternate: Jake MacDonald | Uiseong CC, Uiseong Skip: Kim Dae-hyun; Third: Lee Woo-jung; Second: Park Seong-min; Lead: Kwon Jun-i; Alternate: Shin Eun-jun | CC Wildhaus, Wildhaus Skip: Felix Lüthold; Third: Leon Wittich; Second: Livio Ernst; Lead: Jonas Feierabend; Alternate: Timon Biehle | Chaska CC, Chaska Skip: Wesley Wendling; Third: Daniel Laufer; Second: Nicholas Cenzalli; Lead: Shaheen Bassiri; Alternate: Dylan Ciapka |

=== Round robin standings ===
Final Round Robin Standings

Key
| Teams to Playoffs |
| Teams relegated to 2025 B Championship |

| Country | Skip | W | L | W–L | PF | PA | EW | EL | BE | SE | S% | DSC |
|---|---|---|---|---|---|---|---|---|---|---|---|---|
| Italy | Stefano Spiller | 8 | 1 | – | 73 | 37 | 43 | 30 | 9 | 14 | 81.2% | 31.54 |
| Norway | Lukas Høstmælingen | 7 | 2 | – | 72 | 43 | 42 | 25 | 2 | 23 | 80.3% | 23.36 |
| Scotland | Orrin Carson | 6 | 3 | – | 67 | 57 | 42 | 36 | 4 | 12 | 76.9% | 31.33 |
| South Korea | Kim Dae-hyun | 5 | 4 | – | 59 | 58 | 36 | 35 | 1 | 12 | 72.5% | 50.44 |
| Denmark | Jacob Schmidt | 4 | 5 | 2–0 | 65 | 58 | 33 | 38 | 5 | 4 | 75.8% | 29.33 |
| Japan | Toa Nakahara | 4 | 5 | 1–1 | 43 | 69 | 28 | 34 | 5 | 9 | 72.8% | 33.29 |
| Canada | Kenan Wipf | 4 | 5 | 0–2 | 52 | 67 | 32 | 37 | 4 | 8 | 74.1% | 33.10 |
| Switzerland | Felix Lüthold | 3 | 6 | 1–0 | 48 | 60 | 31 | 38 | 9 | 8 | 73.4% | 34.02 |
| United States | Wesley Wendling | 3 | 6 | 0–1 | 60 | 63 | 38 | 39 | 2 | 11 | 76.0% | 36.54 |
| Germany | Lukas Jäger | 1 | 8 | – | 38 | 65 | 26 | 39 | 7 | 6 | 70.3% | 45.56 |

Round robin summary table
| Pos. | Country | Canada | Denmark | Germany | Italy | Japan | Norway | Scotland | South Korea | Switzerland | United States | Record |
|---|---|---|---|---|---|---|---|---|---|---|---|---|
| 7 | Canada | — | 4–10 | 1–7 | 3–9 | 7–8 | 6–9 | 9–7 | 6–5 | 9–7 | 7–5 | 4–5 |
| 5 | Denmark | 10–4 | — | 10–4 | 5–10 | 9–3 | 2–8 | 7–8 | 9–10 | 10–6 | 3–5 | 4–5 |
| 10 | Germany | 7–1 | 4–10 | — | 3–5 | 5–7 | 1–9 | 3–5 | 4–8 | 4–11 | 7–9 | 1–8 |
| 1 | Italy | 9–3 | 10–5 | 5–3 | — | 10–3 | 11–7 | 9–4 | 5–6 | 6–3 | 8–3 | 8–1 |
| 6 | Japan | 8–7 | 3–9 | 7–5 | 3–10 | — | 1–12 | 4–9 | 3–10 | 6–1 | 8–6 | 4–5 |
| 2 | Norway | 9–6 | 8–2 | 9–1 | 7–11 | 12–1 | — | 1–8 | 8–2 | 6–4 | 12–8 | 7–2 |
| 3 | Scotland | 7–9 | 8–7 | 5–3 | 4–9 | 9–4 | 8–1 | — | 9–7 | 6–7 | 11–10 | 6–3 |
| 4 | South Korea | 5–6 | 10–9 | 8–4 | 6–5 | 10–3 | 2–8 | 7–9 | — | 9–4 | 2–10 | 5–4 |
| 8 | Switzerland | 7–9 | 6–10 | 11–4 | 3–6 | 1–6 | 4–6 | 7–6 | 4–9 | — | 5–4 | 3–6 |
| 9 | United States | 5–7 | 5–3 | 9–7 | 3–8 | 6–8 | 8–12 | 10–11 | 10–2 | 4–5 | — | 3–6 |

=== Round robin results ===
All draw times are listed in Central European Time (UTC+01:00).

==== Draw 1 ====
Saturday, April 12, 14:00

| Sheet A | 1 | 2 | 3 | 4 | 5 | 6 | 7 | 8 | 9 | 10 | Final |
|---|---|---|---|---|---|---|---|---|---|---|---|
| Italy (Spiller) | 0 | 1 | 0 | 0 | 0 | 1 | 2 | 0 | 0 | 1 | 5 |
| Germany (Jäger) | 0 | 0 | 0 | 1 | 1 | 0 | 0 | 1 | 0 | 0 | 3 |

| Sheet B | 1 | 2 | 3 | 4 | 5 | 6 | 7 | 8 | 9 | 10 | Final |
|---|---|---|---|---|---|---|---|---|---|---|---|
| South Korea (Kim) | 0 | 1 | 3 | 1 | 0 | 1 | 2 | 1 | X | X | 9 |
| Switzerland (Lüthold) | 2 | 0 | 0 | 0 | 2 | 0 | 0 | 0 | X | X | 4 |

| Sheet C | 1 | 2 | 3 | 4 | 5 | 6 | 7 | 8 | 9 | 10 | Final |
|---|---|---|---|---|---|---|---|---|---|---|---|
| Norway (Høstmælingen) | 3 | 3 | 0 | 5 | 1 | 0 | X | X | X | X | 12 |
| Japan (Nakahara) | 0 | 0 | 0 | 0 | 0 | 1 | X | X | X | X | 1 |

| Sheet D | 1 | 2 | 3 | 4 | 5 | 6 | 7 | 8 | 9 | 10 | Final |
|---|---|---|---|---|---|---|---|---|---|---|---|
| Denmark (Schmidt) | 2 | 1 | 0 | 3 | 0 | 4 | X | X | X | X | 10 |
| Canada (Wipf) | 0 | 0 | 3 | 0 | 1 | 0 | X | X | X | X | 4 |

==== Draw 2 ====
Sunday, April 13, 9:30

| Sheet A | 1 | 2 | 3 | 4 | 5 | 6 | 7 | 8 | 9 | 10 | 11 | Final |
|---|---|---|---|---|---|---|---|---|---|---|---|---|
| South Korea (Kim) | 0 | 0 | 0 | 1 | 0 | 2 | 0 | 2 | 0 | 0 | 0 | 5 |
| Canada (Wipf) | 0 | 1 | 0 | 0 | 1 | 0 | 2 | 0 | 0 | 1 | 1 | 6 |

| Sheet B | 1 | 2 | 3 | 4 | 5 | 6 | 7 | 8 | 9 | 10 | Final |
|---|---|---|---|---|---|---|---|---|---|---|---|
| Norway (Høstmælingen) | 0 | 2 | 1 | 0 | 2 | 3 | 1 | X | X | X | 9 |
| Germany (Jäger) | 0 | 0 | 0 | 1 | 0 | 0 | 0 | X | X | X | 1 |

| Sheet C | 1 | 2 | 3 | 4 | 5 | 6 | 7 | 8 | 9 | 10 | Final |
|---|---|---|---|---|---|---|---|---|---|---|---|
| Denmark (Schmidt) | 0 | 2 | 0 | 1 | 0 | 2 | 0 | 2 | 0 | 3 | 10 |
| Switzerland (Lüthold) | 1 | 0 | 1 | 0 | 0 | 0 | 2 | 0 | 2 | 0 | 6 |

| Sheet D | 1 | 2 | 3 | 4 | 5 | 6 | 7 | 8 | 9 | 10 | Final |
|---|---|---|---|---|---|---|---|---|---|---|---|
| Scotland (Carson) | 2 | 0 | 2 | 0 | 1 | 0 | 2 | 0 | 3 | 1 | 11 |
| United States (Wendling) | 0 | 3 | 0 | 3 | 0 | 2 | 0 | 2 | 0 | 0 | 10 |

==== Draw 3 ====
Sunday, April 13, 18:30

| Sheet A | 1 | 2 | 3 | 4 | 5 | 6 | 7 | 8 | 9 | 10 | Final |
|---|---|---|---|---|---|---|---|---|---|---|---|
| Japan (Nakahara) | 0 | 0 | 1 | 2 | 0 | 1 | 0 | 2 | X | X | 6 |
| Switzerland (Lüthold) | 0 | 0 | 0 | 0 | 1 | 0 | 0 | 0 | X | X | 1 |

| Sheet B | 1 | 2 | 3 | 4 | 5 | 6 | 7 | 8 | 9 | 10 | 11 | Final |
|---|---|---|---|---|---|---|---|---|---|---|---|---|
| Scotland (Carson) | 0 | 0 | 3 | 0 | 2 | 0 | 0 | 2 | 0 | 0 | 2 | 9 |
| South Korea (Kim) | 2 | 1 | 0 | 1 | 0 | 1 | 0 | 0 | 1 | 1 | 0 | 7 |

| Sheet C | 1 | 2 | 3 | 4 | 5 | 6 | 7 | 8 | 9 | 10 | Final |
|---|---|---|---|---|---|---|---|---|---|---|---|
| Canada (Wipf) | 1 | 0 | 1 | 0 | 2 | 1 | 0 | 1 | 1 | 0 | 7 |
| United States (Wendling) | 0 | 1 | 0 | 2 | 0 | 0 | 1 | 0 | 0 | 1 | 5 |

| Sheet D | 1 | 2 | 3 | 4 | 5 | 6 | 7 | 8 | 9 | 10 | Final |
|---|---|---|---|---|---|---|---|---|---|---|---|
| Italy (Spiller) | 0 | 1 | 0 | 3 | 1 | 0 | 0 | 2 | 0 | 3 | 10 |
| Denmark (Schmidt) | 1 | 0 | 1 | 0 | 0 | 2 | 0 | 0 | 1 | 0 | 5 |

==== Draw 4 ====
Monday, April 14, 14:00

| Sheet A | 1 | 2 | 3 | 4 | 5 | 6 | 7 | 8 | 9 | 10 | Final |
|---|---|---|---|---|---|---|---|---|---|---|---|
| United States (Wendling) | 0 | 0 | 1 | 0 | 1 | 0 | 0 | 1 | 1 | 1 | 5 |
| Denmark (Schmidt) | 0 | 0 | 0 | 2 | 0 | 0 | 1 | 0 | 0 | 0 | 3 |

| Sheet B | 1 | 2 | 3 | 4 | 5 | 6 | 7 | 8 | 9 | 10 | Final |
|---|---|---|---|---|---|---|---|---|---|---|---|
| Switzerland (Lüthold) | 0 | 0 | 1 | 0 | 1 | 0 | 0 | 1 | 0 | X | 3 |
| Italy (Spiller) | 0 | 1 | 0 | 2 | 0 | 2 | 1 | 0 | 0 | X | 6 |

| Sheet C | 1 | 2 | 3 | 4 | 5 | 6 | 7 | 8 | 9 | 10 | Final |
|---|---|---|---|---|---|---|---|---|---|---|---|
| Scotland (Carson) | 0 | 2 | 1 | 1 | 0 | 3 | 1 | X | X | X | 8 |
| Norway (Høstmælingen) | 0 | 0 | 0 | 0 | 1 | 0 | 0 | X | X | X | 1 |

| Sheet D | 1 | 2 | 3 | 4 | 5 | 6 | 7 | 8 | 9 | 10 | Final |
|---|---|---|---|---|---|---|---|---|---|---|---|
| Germany (Jäger) | 2 | 0 | 0 | 0 | 2 | 0 | 1 | 0 | 0 | X | 5 |
| Japan (Nakahara) | 0 | 3 | 1 | 1 | 0 | 2 | 0 | 0 | 0 | X | 7 |

==== Draw 5 ====
Tuesday, April 15, 9:30

| Sheet B | 1 | 2 | 3 | 4 | 5 | 6 | 7 | 8 | 9 | 10 | Final |
|---|---|---|---|---|---|---|---|---|---|---|---|
| Germany (Jäger) | 0 | 0 | 0 | 0 | 3 | 2 | 2 | X | X | X | 7 |
| Canada (Wipf) | 0 | 0 | 0 | 1 | 0 | 0 | 0 | X | X | X | 1 |

| Sheet C | 1 | 2 | 3 | 4 | 5 | 6 | 7 | 8 | 9 | 10 | Final |
|---|---|---|---|---|---|---|---|---|---|---|---|
| Italy (Spiller) | 0 | 2 | 0 | 3 | 1 | 1 | 3 | X | X | X | 10 |
| Japan (Nakahara) | 1 | 0 | 2 | 0 | 0 | 0 | 0 | X | X | X | 3 |

| Sheet D | 1 | 2 | 3 | 4 | 5 | 6 | 7 | 8 | 9 | 10 | Final |
|---|---|---|---|---|---|---|---|---|---|---|---|
| South Korea (Kim) | 0 | 0 | 2 | 0 | 0 | 0 | 0 | X | X | X | 2 |
| Norway (Høstmælingen) | 1 | 1 | 0 | 3 | 1 | 1 | 1 | X | X | X | 8 |

==== Draw 6 ====
Tuesday, April 15, 18:30

| Sheet A | 1 | 2 | 3 | 4 | 5 | 6 | 7 | 8 | 9 | 10 | Final |
|---|---|---|---|---|---|---|---|---|---|---|---|
| Norway (Høstmælingen) | 3 | 0 | 1 | 1 | 2 | 0 | 2 | 0 | 0 | X | 9 |
| Canada (Wipf) | 0 | 3 | 0 | 0 | 0 | 1 | 0 | 0 | 2 | X | 6 |

| Sheet B | 1 | 2 | 3 | 4 | 5 | 6 | 7 | 8 | 9 | 10 | 11 | Final |
|---|---|---|---|---|---|---|---|---|---|---|---|---|
| Denmark (Schmidt) | 1 | 0 | 0 | 1 | 0 | 2 | 0 | 2 | 1 | 0 | 0 | 7 |
| Scotland (Carson) | 0 | 2 | 0 | 0 | 1 | 0 | 2 | 0 | 0 | 2 | 1 | 8 |

| Sheet C | 1 | 2 | 3 | 4 | 5 | 6 | 7 | 8 | 9 | 10 | Final |
|---|---|---|---|---|---|---|---|---|---|---|---|
| South Korea (Kim) | 0 | 0 | 0 | 2 | 0 | 2 | 1 | 0 | 1 | 2 | 8 |
| Germany (Jäger) | 0 | 0 | 2 | 0 | 1 | 0 | 0 | 1 | 0 | 0 | 4 |

| Sheet D | 1 | 2 | 3 | 4 | 5 | 6 | 7 | 8 | 9 | 10 | Final |
|---|---|---|---|---|---|---|---|---|---|---|---|
| United States (Wendling) | 0 | 0 | 0 | 0 | 1 | 0 | 1 | 0 | 2 | 0 | 4 |
| Switzerland (Lüthold) | 0 | 0 | 0 | 0 | 0 | 2 | 0 | 2 | 0 | 1 | 5 |

==== Draw 7 ====
Wednesday, April 16, 14:00

| Sheet A | 1 | 2 | 3 | 4 | 5 | 6 | 7 | 8 | 9 | 10 | Final |
|---|---|---|---|---|---|---|---|---|---|---|---|
| Scotland (Carson) | 0 | 1 | 1 | 0 | 1 | 0 | 0 | 1 | 0 | 0 | 4 |
| Italy (Spiller) | 2 | 0 | 0 | 1 | 0 | 1 | 1 | 0 | 1 | 3 | 9 |

| Sheet B | 1 | 2 | 3 | 4 | 5 | 6 | 7 | 8 | 9 | 10 | Final |
|---|---|---|---|---|---|---|---|---|---|---|---|
| Japan (Nakahara) | 0 | 2 | 0 | 1 | 1 | 0 | 2 | 2 | 0 | X | 8 |
| United States (Wendling) | 1 | 0 | 3 | 0 | 0 | 1 | 0 | 0 | 1 | X | 6 |

| Sheet C | 1 | 2 | 3 | 4 | 5 | 6 | 7 | 8 | 9 | 10 | Final |
|---|---|---|---|---|---|---|---|---|---|---|---|
| Switzerland (Lüthold) | 0 | 1 | 0 | 1 | 0 | 0 | 2 | 3 | 0 | 0 | 7 |
| Canada (Wipf) | 1 | 0 | 2 | 0 | 2 | 0 | 0 | 0 | 2 | 2 | 9 |

| Sheet D | 1 | 2 | 3 | 4 | 5 | 6 | 7 | 8 | 9 | 10 | Final |
|---|---|---|---|---|---|---|---|---|---|---|---|
| Denmark (Schmidt) | 0 | 1 | 0 | 0 | 2 | 0 | 2 | 0 | 4 | 0 | 9 |
| South Korea (Kim) | 0 | 0 | 4 | 1 | 0 | 1 | 0 | 2 | 0 | 2 | 10 |

==== Draw 8 ====
Thursday, April 17, 9:30

| Sheet A | 1 | 2 | 3 | 4 | 5 | 6 | 7 | 8 | 9 | 10 | Final |
|---|---|---|---|---|---|---|---|---|---|---|---|
| Germany (Jäger) | 0 | 0 | 1 | 0 | 2 | 1 | 2 | 0 | 1 | 0 | 7 |
| United States (Wendling) | 2 | 2 | 0 | 1 | 0 | 0 | 0 | 2 | 0 | 2 | 9 |

| Sheet B | 1 | 2 | 3 | 4 | 5 | 6 | 7 | 8 | 9 | 10 | Final |
|---|---|---|---|---|---|---|---|---|---|---|---|
| Italy (Spiller) | 3 | 0 | 1 | 0 | 0 | 0 | 2 | 0 | 3 | 2 | 11 |
| Norway (Høstmælingen) | 0 | 2 | 0 | 2 | 1 | 1 | 0 | 1 | 0 | 0 | 7 |

| Sheet D | 1 | 2 | 3 | 4 | 5 | 6 | 7 | 8 | 9 | 10 | Final |
|---|---|---|---|---|---|---|---|---|---|---|---|
| Japan (Nakahara) | 0 | 1 | 0 | 3 | 0 | 0 | 0 | 0 | X | X | 4 |
| Scotland (Carson) | 2 | 0 | 3 | 0 | 0 | 1 | 2 | 1 | X | X | 9 |

==== Draw 9 ====
Thursday, April 17, 18:30

| Sheet A | 1 | 2 | 3 | 4 | 5 | 6 | 7 | 8 | 9 | 10 | Final |
|---|---|---|---|---|---|---|---|---|---|---|---|
| Switzerland (Lüthold) | 0 | 2 | 0 | 1 | 0 | 0 | 0 | 0 | 1 | X | 4 |
| Norway (Høstmælingen) | 0 | 0 | 1 | 0 | 1 | 2 | 1 | 1 | 0 | X | 6 |

| Sheet B | 1 | 2 | 3 | 4 | 5 | 6 | 7 | 8 | 9 | 10 | Final |
|---|---|---|---|---|---|---|---|---|---|---|---|
| Germany (Jäger) | 0 | 2 | 0 | 1 | 0 | 1 | 0 | X | X | X | 4 |
| Denmark (Schmidt) | 2 | 0 | 1 | 0 | 4 | 0 | 3 | X | X | X | 10 |

| Sheet C | 1 | 2 | 3 | 4 | 5 | 6 | 7 | 8 | 9 | 10 | Final |
|---|---|---|---|---|---|---|---|---|---|---|---|
| Japan (Nakahara) | 0 | 2 | 0 | 0 | 0 | 1 | 0 | X | X | X | 3 |
| South Korea (Kim) | 1 | 0 | 4 | 0 | 3 | 0 | 2 | X | X | X | 10 |

| Sheet D | 1 | 2 | 3 | 4 | 5 | 6 | 7 | 8 | 9 | 10 | Final |
|---|---|---|---|---|---|---|---|---|---|---|---|
| Canada (Wipf) | 0 | 0 | 2 | 0 | 0 | 1 | 0 | 0 | 0 | X | 3 |
| Italy (Spiller) | 0 | 2 | 0 | 0 | 2 | 0 | 1 | 1 | 3 | X | 9 |

==== Draw 10 ====
Friday, April 18, 14:00

| Sheet A | 1 | 2 | 3 | 4 | 5 | 6 | 7 | 8 | 9 | 10 | Final |
|---|---|---|---|---|---|---|---|---|---|---|---|
| Canada (Wipf) | 3 | 0 | 0 | 3 | 0 | 1 | 0 | 2 | 0 | X | 9 |
| Scotland (Carson) | 0 | 3 | 1 | 0 | 0 | 0 | 2 | 0 | 1 | X | 7 |

| Sheet B | 1 | 2 | 3 | 4 | 5 | 6 | 7 | 8 | 9 | 10 | Final |
|---|---|---|---|---|---|---|---|---|---|---|---|
| United States (Wendling) | 0 | 1 | 1 | 0 | 1 | 3 | 2 | 2 | X | X | 10 |
| South Korea (Kim) | 0 | 0 | 0 | 2 | 0 | 0 | 0 | 0 | X | X | 2 |

| Sheet C | 1 | 2 | 3 | 4 | 5 | 6 | 7 | 8 | 9 | 10 | Final |
|---|---|---|---|---|---|---|---|---|---|---|---|
| Norway (Høstmælingen) | 1 | 1 | 0 | 1 | 2 | 2 | 1 | X | X | X | 8 |
| Denmark (Schmidt) | 0 | 0 | 2 | 0 | 0 | 0 | 0 | X | X | X | 2 |

| Sheet D | 1 | 2 | 3 | 4 | 5 | 6 | 7 | 8 | 9 | 10 | Final |
|---|---|---|---|---|---|---|---|---|---|---|---|
| Switzerland (Lüthold) | 0 | 2 | 3 | 0 | 2 | 1 | 2 | 1 | X | X | 11 |
| Germany (Jäger) | 2 | 0 | 0 | 2 | 0 | 0 | 0 | 0 | X | X | 4 |

==== Draw 11 ====
Saturday, April 19, 9:30

| Sheet A | 1 | 2 | 3 | 4 | 5 | 6 | 7 | 8 | 9 | 10 | Final |
|---|---|---|---|---|---|---|---|---|---|---|---|
| Denmark (Schmidt) | 3 | 0 | 2 | 0 | 0 | 3 | 1 | 0 | X | X | 9 |
| Japan (Nakahara) | 0 | 1 | 0 | 0 | 1 | 0 | 0 | 1 | X | X | 3 |

| Sheet B | 1 | 2 | 3 | 4 | 5 | 6 | 7 | 8 | 9 | 10 | Final |
|---|---|---|---|---|---|---|---|---|---|---|---|
| Scotland (Carson) | 0 | 0 | 1 | 0 | 1 | 0 | 1 | 0 | 3 | X | 6 |
| Switzerland (Lüthold) | 1 | 2 | 0 | 2 | 0 | 1 | 0 | 1 | 0 | X | 7 |

| Sheet C | 1 | 2 | 3 | 4 | 5 | 6 | 7 | 8 | 9 | 10 | Final |
|---|---|---|---|---|---|---|---|---|---|---|---|
| United States (Wendling) | 0 | 0 | 0 | 0 | 1 | 0 | 0 | 2 | 0 | X | 3 |
| Italy (Spiller) | 2 | 0 | 1 | 1 | 0 | 2 | 1 | 0 | 1 | X | 8 |

==== Draw 12 ====
Saturday, April 19, 18:30

| Sheet A | 1 | 2 | 3 | 4 | 5 | 6 | 7 | 8 | 9 | 10 | Final |
|---|---|---|---|---|---|---|---|---|---|---|---|
| Italy (Spiller) | 0 | 0 | 0 | 1 | 0 | 2 | 0 | 0 | 2 | 0 | 5 |
| South Korea (Kim) | 0 | 1 | 0 | 0 | 1 | 0 | 1 | 2 | 0 | 1 | 6 |

| Sheet B | 1 | 2 | 3 | 4 | 5 | 6 | 7 | 8 | 9 | 10 | Final |
|---|---|---|---|---|---|---|---|---|---|---|---|
| Canada (Wipf) | 0 | 0 | 1 | 2 | 1 | 0 | 3 | 0 | 0 | 0 | 7 |
| Japan (Nakahara) | 1 | 2 | 0 | 0 | 0 | 2 | 0 | 2 | 0 | 1 | 8 |

| Sheet C | 1 | 2 | 3 | 4 | 5 | 6 | 7 | 8 | 9 | 10 | Final |
|---|---|---|---|---|---|---|---|---|---|---|---|
| Germany (Jäger) | 0 | 0 | 0 | 1 | 0 | 1 | 0 | 0 | 1 | X | 3 |
| Scotland (Carson) | 1 | 0 | 1 | 0 | 1 | 0 | 1 | 1 | 0 | X | 5 |

| Sheet D | 1 | 2 | 3 | 4 | 5 | 6 | 7 | 8 | 9 | 10 | Final |
|---|---|---|---|---|---|---|---|---|---|---|---|
| Norway (Høstmælingen) | 0 | 3 | 0 | 2 | 1 | 0 | 1 | 0 | 0 | 5 | 12 |
| United States (Wendling) | 2 | 0 | 1 | 0 | 0 | 1 | 0 | 3 | 1 | 0 | 8 |

=== Playoffs ===
Semifinals
1 | Italy | 9
4 | South Korea | 2
2 | Norway | 7
3 | Scotland | 6

Gold medal game
1 | Italy | 9
2 | Norway | 5
Bronze medal game
4 | South Korea | 2
3 | Scotland | 7

==== Semifinals ====
Sunday, April 20, 15:30

| Sheet A | 1 | 2 | 3 | 4 | 5 | 6 | 7 | 8 | 9 | 10 | Final |
|---|---|---|---|---|---|---|---|---|---|---|---|
| Norway (Høstmælingen) | 0 | 2 | 0 | 1 | 0 | 2 | 1 | 0 | 1 | 0 | 7 |
| Scotland (Carson) | 1 | 0 | 2 | 0 | 1 | 0 | 0 | 1 | 0 | 1 | 6 |

Player percentages
| Norway | | Scotland | |
|---|---|---|---|
| Eskil Eriksen | 83% | Charlie Gibb | 69% |
| Magnus Lillebø | 79% | Archie Hyslop | 88% |
| Tinius Haslev Nordbye | 80% | Logan Carson | 70% |
| Lukas Høstmælingen | 79% | Orrin Carson | 74% |
| Total | 79% | Total | 76% |

| Sheet C | 1 | 2 | 3 | 4 | 5 | 6 | 7 | 8 | 9 | 10 | Final |
|---|---|---|---|---|---|---|---|---|---|---|---|
| Italy (Spiller) | 0 | 2 | 1 | 0 | 3 | 0 | 2 | 1 | X | X | 9 |
| South Korea (Kim) | 0 | 0 | 0 | 1 | 0 | 1 | 0 | 0 | X | X | 2 |

Player percentages
| Italy | | South Korea | |
|---|---|---|---|
| Francesco Vigliani | 98% | Kwon Jun-i | 88% |
| Andrea Gilli | 86% | Park Seong-min | 84% |
| Stefano Gilli | 78% | Lee Woo-jung | 66% |
| Stefano Spiller | 98% | Kim Dae-hyun | 53% |
| Total | 90% | Total | 73% |

==== Bronze medal game ====
Monday, April 21, 15:00

| Sheet D | 1 | 2 | 3 | 4 | 5 | 6 | 7 | 8 | 9 | 10 | Final |
|---|---|---|---|---|---|---|---|---|---|---|---|
| South Korea (Kim) | 0 | 0 | 0 | 1 | 0 | 1 | 0 | 0 | X | X | 2 |
| Scotland (Carson) | 0 | 1 | 0 | 0 | 3 | 0 | 1 | 2 | X | X | 7 |

Player percentages
| South Korea | | Scotland | |
|---|---|---|---|
| Shin Eun-jun | 59% | Charlie Gibb | 75% |
| Park Seong-min | 73% | Archie Hyslop | 81% |
| Lee Woo-jung | 80% | Logan Carson | 83% |
| Kim Dae-hyun | 56% | Orrin Carson | 86% |
| Total | 67% | Total | 81% |

==== Gold medal game ====
Monday, April 21, 15:00

| Sheet B | 1 | 2 | 3 | 4 | 5 | 6 | 7 | 8 | 9 | 10 | Final |
|---|---|---|---|---|---|---|---|---|---|---|---|
| Italy (Spiller) | 0 | 0 | 0 | 3 | 1 | 0 | 1 | 0 | 3 | 1 | 9 |
| Norway (Høstmælingen) | 0 | 0 | 0 | 0 | 0 | 3 | 0 | 2 | 0 | 0 | 5 |

Player percentages
| Italy | | Norway | |
|---|---|---|---|
| Francesco Vigliani | 83% | Eskil Eriksen | 93% |
| Andrea Gilli | 78% | Magnus Lillebø | 75% |
| Stefano Gilli | 84% | Tinius Haslev Nordbye | 78% |
| Stefano Spiller | 90% | Lukas Høstmælingen | 78% |
| Total | 84% | Total | 81% |

=== Player percentages ===
Round robin only

| Leads | % |
|---|---|
| (Norway) Eskil Eriksen | 82.1 |
| (United States) Shaheen Bassiri | 81.8 |
| (Italy) Francesco Vigliani | 81.8 |
| (Canada) Max Cinnamon | 81.7 |
| (Germany) Raphael Amberger | 81.2 |
| (Denmark) Liam Goldbeck | 80.6 |
| (Scotland) Charlie Gibb | 80.3 |
| (Switzerland) Jonas Feierabend | 79.0 |
| (South Korea) Kwon Jun-i | 77.6 |
| (Japan) Yuta Kimura | 73.9 |

| Seconds | % |
|---|---|
| (Norway) Magnus Lillebø | 86.8 |
| (Italy) Andrea Gilli | 82.9 |
| (Denmark) Kasper Jurlander Bøge (Note: Includes five games throwing third rocks) | 78.0 |
| (United States) Nicholas Cenzalli | 73.6 |
| (Germany) Adrian Enders | 72.8 |
| (Japan) Riku Takemura | 72.8 |
| (Scotland) Archie Hyslop | 72.7 |
| (Canada) Michael Keenan | 71.8 |
| (South Korea) Park Seong-min | 71.0 |
| (Switzerland) Livio Ernst | 68.6 |

| Thirds | % |
|---|---|
| (Italy) Stefano Gilli | 80.7 |
| (United States) Daniel Laufer | 78.7 |
| (Norway) Tinius Haslev Nordbye | 78.4 |
| (Scotland) Logan Carson | 77.7 |
| (Switzerland) Leon Wittich | 76.9 |
| (Canada) Ky Macaulay | 73.3 |
| (South Korea) Lee Woo-jung | 72.9 |
| (Japan) Hinata Michitani | 72.0 |
| (Denmark) Alexander Qvist (Note: Includes five games throwing second rocks) | 70.4 |
| (Germany) Leonhard Angrick | 68.2 |

| Skips | % |
|---|---|
| (Italy) Stefano Spiller | 79.5 |
| (Scotland) Orrin Carson | 76.0 |
| (Denmark) Jacob Schmidt | 75.2 |
| (Norway) Lukas Høstmælingen | 73.8 |
| (South Korea) Kim Dae-hyun | 70.6 |
| (United States) Wesley Wendling | 70.1 |
| (Canada) Kenan Wipf | 69.6 |
| (Switzerland) Felix Lüthold | 69.5 |
| (Japan) Toa Nakahara | 67.0 |
| (Germany) Lukas Jäger | 59.0 |

=== Final standings ===
Key
| Teams relegated to 2025 World Junior-B Curling Championships |

| Place | Team |
|---|---|
| 1st place, gold medalist(s) | Italy |
| 2nd place, silver medalist(s) | Norway |
| 3rd place, bronze medalist(s) | Scotland |
| 4 | South Korea |
| 5 | Denmark |
| 6 | Japan |
| 7 | Canada |
| 8 | Switzerland |
| 9 | United States |
| 10 | Germany |

== Women ==
=== Qualification ===
The following nations qualified to participate in the 2025 World Junior Curling Championship:

| Event | Vacancies | Qualified |
|---|---|---|
| Host Nation | 1 | Italy |
| 2024 World Junior Curling Championships | 6 | Switzerland; Japan; Norway; Canada; Sweden; Germany |
| 2024 World Junior-B Curling Championships | 3 | South Korea; Latvia; China |
| TOTAL | 10 | |

=== Teams ===
The teams are listed as follows:

| Canada | China | Germany | Italy | Japan |
|---|---|---|---|---|
| Halifax CC, Halifax Skip: Allyson MacNutt; Third: Maria Fitzgerald; Second: Alison Umlah; Lead: Grace McCusker; Alternate: Cailey Locke | CSO Curling Club, Beijing Skip: Li Ziru; Third: Gao Ya; Second: Tian Dingning; Lead: Wang Jiayi; Alternate: Chen Zaoxue | CC Füssen, Füssen Fourth: Kim Sutor; Skip: Sara Messenzehl; Second: Joy Sutor; Lead: Annelie Abdel-Halim; Alternate: Emma Waltenberger | Trentino CC, Trentino Skip: Rebecca Mariani; Third: Lucrezia Grande; Second: Letizia Gaia Carlisano; Lead: Rachele Scalesse; Alternate: Giada Zambelli | Sapporo CC, Sapporo Skip: Yuina Miura; Third: Kohane Tsuruga; Second: Ai Matsunaga; Lead: Hana Ikeda; Alternate: Yuna Sakuma |
| Latvia | Norway | South Korea | Sweden | Switzerland |
| Jelgavas KK, Jelgava Skip: Evelīna Barone; Third: Rēzija Ieviņa; Second: Veronika Apse; Lead: Marija Seliverstova; Alternate: Letīcija Ieviņa | Oppdal CK, Oppdal Skip: Torild Bjørnstad; Third: Nora Østgård; Second: Eilin Kjærland; Lead: Andrine Vollan Rønning | Jeonbuk CC, Jeonbuk Skip: Kang Bo-bae; Third: Kim Ji-soo; Second: Shim Yu-jeong; Lead: Kim Min-seo; Alternate: Lee Bo-young | Sundbybergs CK, Sundbyberg Skip: Moa Dryburgh; Third: Thea Orefjord; Second: Moa Tjærnlund; Lead: Maja Roxin; Alternate: Erika Ryberg | Curling Bern, Bern Skip: Ariane Oberson; Third: Laurane Flückiger; Second: Lia Germann; Lead: Enya Caccivio; Alternate: Isabel Einspieler |

=== Round robin standings ===
Final Round Robin Standings

Key
| Teams to Playoffs |
| Teams relegated to 2025 B Championship |

| Country | Skip | W | L | W–L | PF | PA | EW | EL | BE | SE | S% | DSC |
|---|---|---|---|---|---|---|---|---|---|---|---|---|
| Germany | Sara Messenzehl | 7 | 2 | – | 73 | 65 | 38 | 42 | 5 | 7 | 71.8% | 51.09 |
| Sweden | Moa Dryburgh | 6 | 3 | 1–0 | 73 | 55 | 39 | 34 | 5 | 12 | 74.0% | 42.97 |
| South Korea | Kang Bo-bae | 6 | 3 | 0–1 | 67 | 51 | 38 | 31 | 0 | 15 | 77.7% | 55.31 |
| Canada | Allyson MacNutt | 5 | 4 | 1–1 | 68 | 61 | 41 | 40 | 2 | 15 | 72.9% | 40.65 |
| China | Li Ziru | 5 | 4 | 1–1 | 64 | 68 | 42 | 40 | 2 | 11 | 73.4% | 41.57 |
| Switzerland | Ariane Oberson | 5 | 4 | 1–1 | 64 | 65 | 42 | 35 | 4 | 12 | 72.6% | 43.26 |
| Norway | Torild Bjørnstad | 4 | 5 | – | 61 | 59 | 38 | 38 | 7 | 8 | 72.4% | 37.10 |
| Japan | Yuina Miura | 3 | 6 | – | 58 | 71 | 39 | 43 | 2 | 12 | 70.2% | 71.48 |
| Latvia | Evelīna Barone | 2 | 7 | 1–0 | 56 | 75 | 33 | 44 | 5 | 9 | 64.4% | 69.09 |
| Italy | Rebecca Mariani | 2 | 7 | 0–1 | 52 | 66 | 36 | 39 | 7 | 13 | 74.3% | 28.66 |

Round robin summary table
| Pos. | Country | Canada | China | Germany | Italy | Japan | Latvia | Norway | South Korea | Sweden | Switzerland | Record |
|---|---|---|---|---|---|---|---|---|---|---|---|---|
| 4 | Canada | — | 8–2 | 9–7 | 4–8 | 8–7 | 11–9 | 9–2 | 4–7 | 8–11 | 7–8 | 5–4 |
| 5 | China | 2–8 | — | 10–8 | 9–8 | 8–12 | 8–5 | 5–8 | 4–9 | 8–7 | 10–3 | 5–4 |
| 1 | Germany | 7–9 | 8–10 | — | 7–6 | 8–5 | 10–7 | 7–6 | 10–9 | 8–7 | 8–6 | 7–2 |
| 10 | Italy | 8–4 | 8–9 | 6–7 | — | 9–7 | 5–7 | 6–10 | 5–9 | 1–6 | 4–7 | 2–7 |
| 8 | Japan | 7–8 | 12–8 | 5–8 | 7–9 | — | 8–6 | 8–6 | 4–10 | 4–7 | 3–9 | 3–6 |
| 9 | Latvia | 9–11 | 5–8 | 7–10 | 7–5 | 6–8 | — | 7–6 | 0–7 | 9–10 | 6–10 | 2–7 |
| 7 | Norway | 2–9 | 8–5 | 6–7 | 10–6 | 6–8 | 6–7 | — | 3–7 | 9–4 | 11–6 | 4–5 |
| 3 | South Korea | 7–4 | 9–4 | 9–10 | 9–5 | 10–4 | 7–0 | 7–3 | — | 2–12 | 7–9 | 6–3 |
| 2 | Sweden | 11–8 | 7–8 | 7–8 | 6–1 | 7–4 | 10–9 | 4–9 | 12–2 | — | 9–6 | 6–3 |
| 6 | Switzerland | 8–7 | 3–10 | 6–8 | 7–4 | 9–3 | 10–6 | 6–11 | 9–7 | 6–9 | — | 5–4 |

=== Round robin results ===
All draw times are listed in Central European Time (UTC+01:00).

==== Draw 1 ====
Saturday, April 12, 9:30

| Sheet A | 1 | 2 | 3 | 4 | 5 | 6 | 7 | 8 | 9 | 10 | Final |
|---|---|---|---|---|---|---|---|---|---|---|---|
| South Korea (Kang) | 0 | 0 | 0 | 1 | 3 | 1 | 1 | 0 | 1 | X | 7 |
| Norway (Bjørnstad) | 0 | 1 | 1 | 0 | 0 | 0 | 0 | 1 | 0 | X | 3 |

| Sheet B | 1 | 2 | 3 | 4 | 5 | 6 | 7 | 8 | 9 | 10 | Final |
|---|---|---|---|---|---|---|---|---|---|---|---|
| Sweden (Dryburgh) | 0 | 0 | 0 | 0 | 1 | 3 | 0 | 1 | 1 | X | 6 |
| Italy (Mariani) | 0 | 0 | 0 | 0 | 0 | 0 | 1 | 0 | 0 | X | 1 |

| Sheet C | 1 | 2 | 3 | 4 | 5 | 6 | 7 | 8 | 9 | 10 | Final |
|---|---|---|---|---|---|---|---|---|---|---|---|
| Switzerland (Oberson) | 1 | 1 | 0 | 1 | 0 | 2 | 0 | 1 | 0 | 2 | 8 |
| Canada (MacNutt) | 0 | 0 | 2 | 0 | 3 | 0 | 1 | 0 | 1 | 0 | 7 |

| Sheet D | 1 | 2 | 3 | 4 | 5 | 6 | 7 | 8 | 9 | 10 | Final |
|---|---|---|---|---|---|---|---|---|---|---|---|
| Germany (Messenzehl) | 3 | 0 | 0 | 0 | 1 | 0 | 2 | 4 | 0 | X | 10 |
| Latvia (Barone) | 0 | 3 | 0 | 1 | 0 | 2 | 0 | 0 | 1 | X | 7 |

==== Draw 2 ====
Saturday, April 12, 19:00

| Sheet A | 1 | 2 | 3 | 4 | 5 | 6 | 7 | 8 | 9 | 10 | Final |
|---|---|---|---|---|---|---|---|---|---|---|---|
| Japan (Miura) | 0 | 0 | 3 | 4 | 0 | 4 | 0 | 1 | 0 | X | 12 |
| China (Li) | 2 | 1 | 0 | 0 | 1 | 0 | 2 | 0 | 2 | X | 8 |

| Sheet B | 1 | 2 | 3 | 4 | 5 | 6 | 7 | 8 | 9 | 10 | Final |
|---|---|---|---|---|---|---|---|---|---|---|---|
| Switzerland (Oberson) | 3 | 1 | 0 | 1 | 0 | 2 | 0 | 1 | 0 | 1 | 9 |
| South Korea (Kang) | 0 | 0 | 2 | 0 | 2 | 0 | 2 | 0 | 1 | 0 | 7 |

| Sheet C | 1 | 2 | 3 | 4 | 5 | 6 | 7 | 8 | 9 | 10 | Final |
|---|---|---|---|---|---|---|---|---|---|---|---|
| Latvia (Barone) | 0 | 0 | 0 | 2 | 0 | 2 | 0 | 2 | 0 | 3 | 9 |
| Sweden (Dryburgh) | 2 | 2 | 1 | 0 | 3 | 0 | 1 | 0 | 1 | 0 | 10 |

| Sheet D | 1 | 2 | 3 | 4 | 5 | 6 | 7 | 8 | 9 | 10 | Final |
|---|---|---|---|---|---|---|---|---|---|---|---|
| Italy (Mariani) | 1 | 0 | 2 | 2 | 0 | 0 | 1 | 0 | 0 | X | 6 |
| Norway (Bjørnstad) | 0 | 3 | 0 | 0 | 2 | 2 | 0 | 2 | 1 | X | 10 |

==== Draw 3 ====
Sunday, April 13, 14:00

| Sheet A | 1 | 2 | 3 | 4 | 5 | 6 | 7 | 8 | 9 | 10 | 11 | Final |
|---|---|---|---|---|---|---|---|---|---|---|---|---|
| Latvia (Barone) | 0 | 1 | 0 | 0 | 0 | 0 | 1 | 1 | 0 | 2 | 2 | 7 |
| Italy (Mariani) | 0 | 0 | 0 | 1 | 1 | 2 | 0 | 0 | 1 | 0 | 0 | 5 |

| Sheet B | 1 | 2 | 3 | 4 | 5 | 6 | 7 | 8 | 9 | 10 | Final |
|---|---|---|---|---|---|---|---|---|---|---|---|
| Japan (Miura) | 0 | 0 | 0 | 1 | 0 | 1 | 1 | 0 | 3 | 1 | 7 |
| Canada (MacNutt) | 0 | 1 | 3 | 0 | 1 | 0 | 0 | 3 | 0 | 0 | 8 |

| Sheet C | 1 | 2 | 3 | 4 | 5 | 6 | 7 | 8 | 9 | 10 | 11 | Final |
|---|---|---|---|---|---|---|---|---|---|---|---|---|
| Norway (Bjørnstad) | 0 | 1 | 0 | 0 | 0 | 0 | 3 | 1 | 0 | 1 | 0 | 6 |
| Germany (Messenzehl) | 2 | 0 | 1 | 0 | 0 | 0 | 0 | 0 | 3 | 0 | 1 | 7 |

| Sheet D | 1 | 2 | 3 | 4 | 5 | 6 | 7 | 8 | 9 | 10 | Final |
|---|---|---|---|---|---|---|---|---|---|---|---|
| China (Li) | 0 | 0 | 1 | 0 | 0 | 1 | 0 | 1 | 1 | X | 4 |
| South Korea (Kang) | 2 | 1 | 0 | 2 | 1 | 0 | 3 | 0 | 0 | X | 9 |

==== Draw 4 ====
Monday, April 14, 9:30

| Sheet A | 1 | 2 | 3 | 4 | 5 | 6 | 7 | 8 | 9 | 10 | Final |
|---|---|---|---|---|---|---|---|---|---|---|---|
| Switzerland (Oberson) | 2 | 0 | 0 | 2 | 2 | 2 | 0 | 1 | X | X | 9 |
| Japan (Miura) | 0 | 1 | 0 | 0 | 0 | 0 | 2 | 0 | X | X | 3 |

| Sheet B | 1 | 2 | 3 | 4 | 5 | 6 | 7 | 8 | 9 | 10 | Final |
|---|---|---|---|---|---|---|---|---|---|---|---|
| China (Li) | 3 | 0 | 1 | 0 | 1 | 0 | 0 | 0 | 4 | 1 | 10 |
| Germany (Messenzehl) | 0 | 2 | 0 | 2 | 0 | 1 | 2 | 1 | 0 | 0 | 8 |

| Sheet D | 1 | 2 | 3 | 4 | 5 | 6 | 7 | 8 | 9 | 10 | Final |
|---|---|---|---|---|---|---|---|---|---|---|---|
| Canada (MacNutt) | 0 | 2 | 0 | 1 | 0 | 4 | 0 | 0 | 1 | 0 | 8 |
| Sweden (Dryburgh) | 2 | 0 | 3 | 0 | 1 | 0 | 2 | 1 | 0 | 2 | 11 |

==== Draw 5 ====
Monday, April 14, 18:30

| Sheet A | 1 | 2 | 3 | 4 | 5 | 6 | 7 | 8 | 9 | 10 | 11 | Final |
|---|---|---|---|---|---|---|---|---|---|---|---|---|
| Germany (Messenzehl) | 1 | 1 | 0 | 0 | 1 | 0 | 0 | 4 | 0 | 0 | 0 | 7 |
| Canada (MacNutt) | 0 | 0 | 1 | 1 | 0 | 1 | 1 | 0 | 2 | 1 | 2 | 9 |

| Sheet B | 1 | 2 | 3 | 4 | 5 | 6 | 7 | 8 | 9 | 10 | Final |
|---|---|---|---|---|---|---|---|---|---|---|---|
| Sweden (Dryburgh) | 0 | 0 | 0 | 2 | 0 | 1 | 0 | 1 | 0 | X | 4 |
| Norway (Bjørnstad) | 0 | 1 | 1 | 0 | 2 | 0 | 1 | 0 | 4 | X | 9 |

| Sheet C | 1 | 2 | 3 | 4 | 5 | 6 | 7 | 8 | 9 | 10 | Final |
|---|---|---|---|---|---|---|---|---|---|---|---|
| South Korea (Kang) | 0 | 4 | 1 | 2 | 0 | 0 | X | X | X | X | 7 |
| Latvia (Barone) | 0 | 0 | 0 | 0 | 0 | 0 | X | X | X | X | 0 |

| Sheet D | 1 | 2 | 3 | 4 | 5 | 6 | 7 | 8 | 9 | 10 | Final |
|---|---|---|---|---|---|---|---|---|---|---|---|
| Switzerland (Oberson) | 1 | 0 | 0 | 4 | 0 | 0 | 0 | 2 | 0 | X | 7 |
| Italy (Mariani) | 0 | 0 | 0 | 0 | 1 | 2 | 0 | 0 | 1 | X | 4 |

==== Draw 6 ====
Tuesday, April 15, 14:00

| Sheet A | 1 | 2 | 3 | 4 | 5 | 6 | 7 | 8 | 9 | 10 | Final |
|---|---|---|---|---|---|---|---|---|---|---|---|
| Sweden (Dryburgh) | 0 | 5 | 0 | 0 | 3 | 4 | X | X | X | X | 12 |
| South Korea (Kang) | 0 | 0 | 1 | 1 | 0 | 0 | X | X | X | X | 2 |

| Sheet B | 1 | 2 | 3 | 4 | 5 | 6 | 7 | 8 | 9 | 10 | Final |
|---|---|---|---|---|---|---|---|---|---|---|---|
| Latvia (Barone) | 0 | 2 | 0 | 2 | 0 | 0 | 0 | 2 | 0 | X | 6 |
| Switzerland (Oberson) | 0 | 0 | 2 | 0 | 1 | 1 | 5 | 0 | 1 | X | 10 |

| Sheet C | 1 | 2 | 3 | 4 | 5 | 6 | 7 | 8 | 9 | 10 | 11 | Final |
|---|---|---|---|---|---|---|---|---|---|---|---|---|
| China (Li) | 0 | 0 | 1 | 3 | 1 | 0 | 0 | 1 | 2 | 0 | 1 | 9 |
| Italy (Mariani) | 2 | 1 | 0 | 0 | 0 | 1 | 0 | 0 | 0 | 4 | 0 | 8 |

| Sheet D | 1 | 2 | 3 | 4 | 5 | 6 | 7 | 8 | 9 | 10 | Final |
|---|---|---|---|---|---|---|---|---|---|---|---|
| Norway (Bjørnstad) | 0 | 1 | 0 | 1 | 0 | 3 | 0 | 1 | 0 | 0 | 6 |
| Japan (Miura) | 2 | 0 | 1 | 0 | 2 | 0 | 1 | 0 | 1 | 1 | 8 |

==== Draw 7 ====
Wednesday, April 16, 9:30

| Sheet B | 1 | 2 | 3 | 4 | 5 | 6 | 7 | 8 | 9 | 10 | Final |
|---|---|---|---|---|---|---|---|---|---|---|---|
| Italy (Mariani) | 1 | 0 | 1 | 0 | 0 | 1 | 2 | 1 | 2 | X | 8 |
| Canada (MacNutt) | 0 | 2 | 0 | 1 | 1 | 0 | 0 | 0 | 0 | X | 4 |

| Sheet C | 1 | 2 | 3 | 4 | 5 | 6 | 7 | 8 | 9 | 10 | Final |
|---|---|---|---|---|---|---|---|---|---|---|---|
| Japan (Miura) | 0 | 0 | 2 | 0 | 1 | 0 | 1 | 1 | 0 | 0 | 5 |
| Germany (Messenzehl) | 0 | 1 | 0 | 2 | 0 | 1 | 0 | 0 | 3 | 1 | 8 |

| Sheet D | 1 | 2 | 3 | 4 | 5 | 6 | 7 | 8 | 9 | 10 | Final |
|---|---|---|---|---|---|---|---|---|---|---|---|
| Latvia (Barone) | 1 | 0 | 2 | 0 | 1 | 0 | 1 | 0 | 0 | 0 | 5 |
| China (Li) | 0 | 1 | 0 | 1 | 0 | 1 | 0 | 2 | 1 | 2 | 8 |

==== Draw 8 ====
Wednesday, April 16, 18:30

| Sheet A | 1 | 2 | 3 | 4 | 5 | 6 | 7 | 8 | 9 | 10 | Final |
|---|---|---|---|---|---|---|---|---|---|---|---|
| Norway (Bjørnstad) | 5 | 0 | 1 | 1 | 0 | 1 | 2 | 0 | 1 | X | 11 |
| Switzerland (Oberson) | 0 | 2 | 0 | 0 | 3 | 0 | 0 | 1 | 0 | X | 6 |

| Sheet B | 1 | 2 | 3 | 4 | 5 | 6 | 7 | 8 | 9 | 10 | Final |
|---|---|---|---|---|---|---|---|---|---|---|---|
| South Korea (Kang) | 2 | 2 | 2 | 0 | 2 | 0 | 0 | 2 | X | X | 10 |
| Japan (Miura) | 0 | 0 | 0 | 2 | 0 | 1 | 1 | 0 | X | X | 4 |

| Sheet C | 1 | 2 | 3 | 4 | 5 | 6 | 7 | 8 | 9 | 10 | Final |
|---|---|---|---|---|---|---|---|---|---|---|---|
| Canada (MacNutt) | 1 | 1 | 0 | 3 | 1 | 1 | 0 | 1 | X | X | 8 |
| China (Li) | 0 | 0 | 1 | 0 | 0 | 0 | 1 | 0 | X | X | 2 |

| Sheet D | 1 | 2 | 3 | 4 | 5 | 6 | 7 | 8 | 9 | 10 | Final |
|---|---|---|---|---|---|---|---|---|---|---|---|
| Sweden (Dryburgh) | 0 | 0 | 0 | 2 | 0 | 0 | 2 | 0 | 3 | 0 | 7 |
| Germany (Messenzehl) | 0 | 0 | 2 | 0 | 0 | 2 | 0 | 1 | 0 | 3 | 8 |

==== Draw 9 ====
Thursday, April 17, 14:00

| Sheet A | 1 | 2 | 3 | 4 | 5 | 6 | 7 | 8 | 9 | 10 | Final |
|---|---|---|---|---|---|---|---|---|---|---|---|
| Italy (Mariani) | 0 | 0 | 0 | 1 | 1 | 1 | 0 | 2 | 1 | 0 | 6 |
| Germany (Messenzehl) | 0 | 0 | 2 | 0 | 0 | 0 | 4 | 0 | 0 | 1 | 7 |

| Sheet B | 1 | 2 | 3 | 4 | 5 | 6 | 7 | 8 | 9 | 10 | Final |
|---|---|---|---|---|---|---|---|---|---|---|---|
| Switzerland (Oberson) | 0 | 1 | 1 | 0 | 1 | 0 | 1 | 1 | 1 | 0 | 6 |
| Sweden (Dryburgh) | 1 | 0 | 0 | 3 | 0 | 1 | 0 | 0 | 0 | 4 | 9 |

| Sheet C | 1 | 2 | 3 | 4 | 5 | 6 | 7 | 8 | 9 | 10 | 11 | Final |
|---|---|---|---|---|---|---|---|---|---|---|---|---|
| Latvia (Barone) | 0 | 0 | 1 | 0 | 0 | 3 | 0 | 1 | 0 | 1 | 1 | 7 |
| Norway (Bjørnstad) | 1 | 0 | 0 | 2 | 0 | 0 | 1 | 0 | 2 | 0 | 0 | 6 |

| Sheet D | 1 | 2 | 3 | 4 | 5 | 6 | 7 | 8 | 9 | 10 | Final |
|---|---|---|---|---|---|---|---|---|---|---|---|
| South Korea (Kang) | 0 | 0 | 1 | 1 | 0 | 1 | 1 | 0 | 0 | 3 | 7 |
| Canada (MacNutt) | 0 | 2 | 0 | 0 | 1 | 0 | 0 | 0 | 1 | 0 | 4 |

==== Draw 10 ====
Friday, April 18, 9:30

| Sheet A | 1 | 2 | 3 | 4 | 5 | 6 | 7 | 8 | 9 | 10 | Final |
|---|---|---|---|---|---|---|---|---|---|---|---|
| Japan (Miura) | 0 | 2 | 1 | 1 | 1 | 0 | 0 | 2 | 0 | 1 | 8 |
| Latvia (Barone) | 2 | 0 | 0 | 0 | 0 | 2 | 1 | 0 | 1 | 0 | 6 |

| Sheet B | 1 | 2 | 3 | 4 | 5 | 6 | 7 | 8 | 9 | 10 | Final |
|---|---|---|---|---|---|---|---|---|---|---|---|
| Norway (Bjørnstad) | 2 | 0 | 1 | 3 | 0 | 1 | 0 | 1 | 0 | X | 8 |
| China (Li) | 0 | 1 | 0 | 0 | 1 | 0 | 1 | 0 | 2 | X | 5 |

| Sheet C | 1 | 2 | 3 | 4 | 5 | 6 | 7 | 8 | 9 | 10 | Final |
|---|---|---|---|---|---|---|---|---|---|---|---|
| Italy (Mariani) | 0 | 0 | 1 | 0 | 1 | 0 | 2 | 0 | 1 | X | 5 |
| South Korea (Kang) | 0 | 4 | 0 | 2 | 0 | 2 | 0 | 1 | 0 | X | 9 |

==== Draw 11 ====
Friday, April 18, 18:30

| Sheet A | 1 | 2 | 3 | 4 | 5 | 6 | 7 | 8 | 9 | 10 | Final |
|---|---|---|---|---|---|---|---|---|---|---|---|
| China (Li) | 3 | 0 | 0 | 2 | 1 | 1 | 0 | 1 | 0 | 0 | 8 |
| Sweden (Dryburgh) | 0 | 3 | 0 | 0 | 0 | 0 | 1 | 0 | 1 | 2 | 7 |

| Sheet B | 1 | 2 | 3 | 4 | 5 | 6 | 7 | 8 | 9 | 10 | Final |
|---|---|---|---|---|---|---|---|---|---|---|---|
| Canada (MacNutt) | 2 | 0 | 2 | 0 | 0 | 0 | 1 | 2 | 1 | 3 | 11 |
| Latvia (Barone) | 0 | 2 | 0 | 2 | 2 | 3 | 0 | 0 | 0 | 0 | 9 |

| Sheet C | 1 | 2 | 3 | 4 | 5 | 6 | 7 | 8 | 9 | 10 | Final |
|---|---|---|---|---|---|---|---|---|---|---|---|
| Germany (Messenzehl) | 0 | 2 | 0 | 0 | 0 | 1 | 0 | 4 | 0 | 1 | 8 |
| Switzerland (Oberson) | 2 | 0 | 0 | 1 | 1 | 0 | 1 | 0 | 1 | 0 | 6 |

| Sheet D | 1 | 2 | 3 | 4 | 5 | 6 | 7 | 8 | 9 | 10 | 11 | Final |
|---|---|---|---|---|---|---|---|---|---|---|---|---|
| Japan (Miura) | 0 | 0 | 1 | 0 | 1 | 1 | 2 | 0 | 1 | 1 | 0 | 7 |
| Italy (Mariani) | 2 | 3 | 0 | 1 | 0 | 0 | 0 | 1 | 0 | 0 | 2 | 9 |

==== Draw 12 ====
Saturday, April 19, 14:00

| Sheet A | 1 | 2 | 3 | 4 | 5 | 6 | 7 | 8 | 9 | 10 | Final |
|---|---|---|---|---|---|---|---|---|---|---|---|
| Canada (MacNutt) | 0 | 0 | 0 | 4 | 1 | 1 | 0 | 3 | X | X | 9 |
| Norway (Bjørnstad) | 0 | 0 | 1 | 0 | 0 | 0 | 1 | 0 | X | X | 2 |

| Sheet B | 1 | 2 | 3 | 4 | 5 | 6 | 7 | 8 | 9 | 10 | Final |
|---|---|---|---|---|---|---|---|---|---|---|---|
| Germany (Messenzehl) | 1 | 0 | 3 | 0 | 2 | 0 | 2 | 0 | 0 | 2 | 10 |
| South Korea (Kang) | 0 | 3 | 0 | 2 | 0 | 1 | 0 | 2 | 1 | 0 | 9 |

| Sheet C | 1 | 2 | 3 | 4 | 5 | 6 | 7 | 8 | 9 | 10 | Final |
|---|---|---|---|---|---|---|---|---|---|---|---|
| Sweden (Dryburgh) | 0 | 1 | 0 | 1 | 0 | 1 | 1 | 2 | 1 | 0 | 7 |
| Japan (Miura) | 0 | 0 | 2 | 0 | 1 | 0 | 0 | 0 | 0 | 1 | 4 |

| Sheet D | 1 | 2 | 3 | 4 | 5 | 6 | 7 | 8 | 9 | 10 | Final |
|---|---|---|---|---|---|---|---|---|---|---|---|
| China (Li) | 2 | 0 | 2 | 0 | 1 | 1 | 0 | 4 | X | X | 10 |
| Switzerland (Oberson) | 0 | 1 | 0 | 1 | 0 | 0 | 1 | 0 | X | X | 3 |

=== Playoffs ===
Semifinals
1 | Germany | 8
4 | Canada | 5
2 | Sweden | 6
3 | South Korea | 7

Gold medal game
1 | Germany | 2
3 | South Korea | 8
Bronze medal game
4 | Canada | 7
2 | Sweden | 4

==== Semifinals ====
Sunday, April 20, 11:00

| Sheet A | 1 | 2 | 3 | 4 | 5 | 6 | 7 | 8 | 9 | 10 | Final |
|---|---|---|---|---|---|---|---|---|---|---|---|
| Sweden (Dryburgh) | 3 | 0 | 0 | 0 | 2 | 0 | 0 | 0 | 1 | 0 | 6 |
| South Korea (Kang) | 0 | 3 | 1 | 1 | 0 | 0 | 0 | 1 | 0 | 1 | 7 |

Player percentages
| Sweden | | South Korea | |
|---|---|---|---|
| Maja Roxin | 70% | Kim Min-seo | 71% |
| Moa Tjærnlund | 84% | Shim Yu-jeong | 73% |
| Thea Orefjord | 81% | Kim Ji-soo | 70% |
| Moa Dryburgh | 60% | Kang Bo-bae | 86% |
| Total | 74% | Total | 75% |

| Sheet C | 1 | 2 | 3 | 4 | 5 | 6 | 7 | 8 | 9 | 10 | Final |
|---|---|---|---|---|---|---|---|---|---|---|---|
| Germany (Messenzehl) | 0 | 1 | 0 | 2 | 0 | 1 | 1 | 0 | 1 | 2 | 8 |
| Canada (MacNutt) | 1 | 0 | 1 | 0 | 0 | 0 | 0 | 3 | 0 | 0 | 5 |

Player percentages
| Germany | | Canada | |
|---|---|---|---|
| Annelie Abdel-Halim | 86% | Grace McCusker | 88% |
| Joy Sutor | 61% | Alison Umlah | 74% |
| Sara Messenzehl | 66% | Maria Fitzgerald | 65% |
| Kim Sutor | 69% | Allyson MacNutt | 59% |
| Total | 71% | Total | 71% |

==== Bronze medal game ====
Monday, April 21, 10:00

| Sheet D | 1 | 2 | 3 | 4 | 5 | 6 | 7 | 8 | 9 | 10 | Final |
|---|---|---|---|---|---|---|---|---|---|---|---|
| Canada (MacNutt) | 0 | 0 | 1 | 0 | 2 | 0 | 1 | 0 | 3 | X | 7 |
| Sweden (Dryburgh) | 0 | 1 | 0 | 1 | 0 | 1 | 0 | 1 | 0 | X | 4 |

Player percentages
| Canada | | Sweden | |
|---|---|---|---|
| Grace McCusker | 86% | Maja Roxin | 91% |
| Alison Umlah | 74% | Moa Tjærnlund | 64% |
| Maria Fitzgerald | 74% | Thea Orefjord | 61% |
| Allyson MacNutt | 86% | Moa Dryburgh | 75% |
| Total | 80% | Total | 73% |

==== Gold medal game ====
Monday, April 21, 10:00

| Sheet B | 1 | 2 | 3 | 4 | 5 | 6 | 7 | 8 | 9 | 10 | Final |
|---|---|---|---|---|---|---|---|---|---|---|---|
| Germany (Messenzehl) | 1 | 0 | 0 | 1 | 0 | 0 | 0 | 0 | 0 | X | 2 |
| South Korea (Kang) | 0 | 1 | 1 | 0 | 0 | 2 | 1 | 1 | 2 | X | 8 |

Player percentages
| Germany | | South Korea | |
|---|---|---|---|
| Annelie Abdel-Halim | 65% | Kim Min-seo | 93% |
| Joy Sutor | 72% | Shim Yu-jeong | 88% |
| Sara Messenzehl | 79% | Kim Ji-soo | 69% |
| Kim Sutor | 56% | Kang Bo-bae | 85% |
| Total | 68% | Total | 84% |

=== Player percentages ===
Round robin only

| Leads | % |
|---|---|
| (South Korea) Kim Min-seo | 86.7 |
| (Italy) Rachele Scalesse | 84.5 |
| (Switzerland) Enya Caccivio | 81.4 |
| (Canada) Grace McCusker | 79.5 |
| (China) Wang Jiayi | 79.1 |
| (Norway) Andrine Vollan Rønning | 75.6 |
| (Sweden) Maja Roxin | 75.5 |
| (Germany) Annelie Abdel-Halim | 74.3 |
| (Latvia) Marija Seliverstova | 70.3 |
| (Japan) Hana Ikeda | 69.4 |

| Seconds | % |
|---|---|
| (South Korea) Shim Yu-jeong | 74.2 |
| (Sweden) Moa Tjærnlund | 73.5 |
| (Norway) Eilin Kjærland | 73.4 |
| (Japan) Ai Matsunaga | 72.7 |
| (China) Tian Dingning | 72.6 |
| (Germany) Joy Sutor | 72.1 |
| (Italy) Letizia Gaia Carlisano | 68.8 |
| (Canada) Alison Umlah | 68.0 |
| (Switzerland) Lia Germann | 64.0 |
| (Latvia) Veronika Apse | 59.5 |

| Thirds | % |
|---|---|
| (Italy) Lucrezia Grande | 78.4 |
| (South Korea) Kim Ji-soo | 74.8 |
| (Norway) Nora Østgård | 74.3 |
| (Japan) Kohane Tsuruga | 74.1 |
| (Switzerland) Laurane Flückiger | 73.4 |
| (Canada) Maria Fitzgerald | 73.1 |
| (China) Gao Ya | 72.5 |
| (Germany) Sara Messenzehl (Skip) | 72.4 |
| (Sweden) Thea Orefjord | 72.3 |
| (Latvia) Rēzija Ieviņa | 64.4 |

| Skips | % |
|---|---|
| (South Korea) Kang Bo-bae | 75.2 |
| (Sweden) Moa Dryburgh | 74.9 |
| (Switzerland) Ariane Oberson | 71.5 |
| (Canada) Allyson MacNutt | 70.9 |
| (Germany) Kim Sutor (Fourth) | 68.5 |
| (China) Li Ziru | 68.0 |
| (Norway) Torild Bjørnstad | 66.1 |
| (Japan) Yuina Miura | 64.6 |
| (Italy) Rebecca Mariani | 64.0 |
| (Latvia) Evelīna Barone | 63.6 |

=== Final standings ===
Key
| Teams relegated to 2025 World Junior-B Curling Championships |

| Place | Team |
|---|---|
| 1st place, gold medalist(s) | South Korea |
| 2nd place, silver medalist(s) | Germany |
| 3rd place, bronze medalist(s) | Canada |
| 4 | Sweden |
| 5 | China |
| 6 | Switzerland |
| 7 | Norway |
| 8 | Japan |
| 9 | Latvia |
| 10 | Italy |
