= 2025 Women's Masters Basel =

- Host city: Arlesheim, Switzerland
- Arena: Curlingzentrum Region Basel
- Dates: September 12–14
- Winner: (Switzerland) Team Tirinzoni
- Curling club: CC Aarau, Aarau
- Skip: Silvana Tirinzoni
- Fourth: Alina Pätz
- Second: Carole Howald
- Lead: Selina Witschonke
- Coach: Pierre Charette
- Finalist: (Italy) Stefania Constantini

The 2025 Women's Masters Basel was held from September 12 to 14 at the Curlingzentrum Region Basel in Arlesheim, Switzerland. The event was held in a round robin format with a purse of 35,000 CHF. It was the 20th edition of the event.

For a third year in a row, Switzerland's Silvana Tirinzoni won the event, defeating Italy's Stefania Constantini 7–3 in the final. It was the first event of the 2025–26 season for the world number two ranked Tirinzoni, who previously beat Sweden's Anna Hasselborg in the 2023 and 2024 finals. Through the round robin, both teams finished with an unblemished record to advance directly into the quarterfinals. From there, Tirinzoni beat Germany's Sara Messenzehl and Norway's Torild Bjørnstad while Constantini fended off Switzerland's Nadine Bärtschiger and Norway's Marianne Rørvik. Switzerland's Elodie Jerger and Estonia's Liisa Turmann rounded out the playoff field of eight.

== Teams ==
The teams are listed as follows:

Skip	Third	Second	Lead	Alternate	Locale
Nadine Bärtschiger	Melina Bezzola	Anna Gut	Sarah Müller		Luzern, Switzerland
Torild Bjørnstad	Nora Østgård	Ingeborg Forbregd	Eirin Mesloe		Oppdal, Norway
Johanna Blackham	Isabel Einspieler	Nuala Guex	Enya Caccivio	Anika Meier	Basel, Switzerland
Stefania Constantini (Note: Italy formed two test squads with the members of Team Stefania Constantini and Rebecca Mariani.)	Veronica Zappone	Angela Romei	Marta Lo Deserto		Cortina d'Ampezzo, Italy
Kristyna Farková	Ema Košáková	Stella Svitáková	Sofie Krupičková		Prague, Czech Republic
Corrie Hürlimann	Marina Lörtscher	Stefanie Berset	Celine Schwizgebel		Zug, Switzerland
Jana Hoffmann (Fourth)	Jana Hählen	Renée Frigo	Elodie Jerger (Skip)		Baden, Switzerland
Giulia Zardini Lacedelli	Elena Mathis	Lucrezia Grande	Rachele Scalesse		Trentino, Italy
Kim Sutor (Fourth)	Emira Abbes	Zoé Antes	Sara Messenzehl (Skip)	Joy Sutor	Füssen, Germany
Verena Pflügler	Hannah Augustin	Johanna Höss	Teresa Treichl		Kitzbühel, Austria
Kristin Skaslien (Fourth)	Marianne Rørvik (Skip)	Mille Haslev Nordbye	Eilin Kjærland		Lillehammer, Norway
Zoe Schwaller	Jana Soltermann	Anikò Székely	Ladina Ramstein		Limmattal, Switzerland
Hana Synáčková	Linda Nemčoková	Zuzana Pražáková	Karolína Frederiksen		Prague, Czech Republic
Alina Pätz (Fourth)	Silvana Tirinzoni (Skip)	Carole Howald	Selina Witschonke		Aarau, Switzerland
Liisa Turmann	Kerli Laidsalu	Erika Tuvike	Heili Grossmann		Tallinn, Estonia
Dilşat Yıldız	Öznur Polat	İclal Karaman	Berfin Şengül	İfayet Şafak Çalıkuşu	Erzurum, Turkey

== Round robin standings ==
Final Round Robin Standings

Key
Teams to Playoffs
Teams to Crossover Games

Pool A	W	L	PF	PA	SO
(Norway) Torild Bjørnstad	3	0	26	11	1
(Czech Republic) Hana Synáčková	2	1	18	16	13
(Switzerland) Corrie Hürlimann	1	2	16	19	11
(Switzerland) Johanna Blackham	0	3	10	24	7

Pool B	W	L	PF	PA	SO
(Italy) Stefania Constantini	3	0	19	12	10
(Switzerland) Elodie Jerger	2	1	18	13	6
(Germany) Sara Messenzehl	1	2	13	18	2
(Czech Republic) Kristyna Farková	0	3	14	21	14

Pool C	W	L	PF	PA	SO
(Switzerland) Silvana Tirinzoni	3	0	24	6	12
(Switzerland) Nadine Bärtschiger	2	1	19	11	3
(Estonia) Liisa Turmann	1	2	7	20	8
(Austria) Verena Pflügler	0	3	7	20	15

Pool D	W	L	PF	PA	SO
(Norway) Marianne Rørvik	3	0	19	13	4
(Turkey) Dilşat Yıldız	2	1	17	13	16
(Italy) Team Mariani	1	2	11	14	9
(Switzerland) Zoe Schwaller	0	3	11	18	5

== Round robin results ==
All draw times listed in Central European Time (UTC+01:00).

=== Draw 1 ===
Friday, September 12, 8:30 am

Sheet 1	1	2	3	4	5	6	7	8	Final
(Switzerland) Corrie Hürlimann	2	3	1	0	2	X	X	X	8
(Switzerland) Johanna Blackham	0	0	0	1	0	X	X	X	1

Sheet 2	1	2	3	4	5	6	7	8	Final
(Norway) Torild Bjørnstad	2	1	3	1	0	2	X	X	9
(Czech Republic) Hana Synáčková	0	0	0	0	1	0	X	X	1

Sheet 3	1	2	3	4	5	6	7	8	Final
(Italy) Stefania Constantini	0	0	2	1	0	1	1	2	7
(Czech Republic) Kristyna Farková	1	1	0	0	4	0	0	0	6

Sheet 4	1	2	3	4	5	6	7	8	Final
(Germany) Sara Messenzehl	0	0	0	3	0	1	0	X	4
(Switzerland) Elodie Jerger	0	1	1	0	2	0	3	X	7

=== Draw 2 ===
Friday, September 12, 12:00 pm

Sheet 2	1	2	3	4	5	6	7	8	Final
(Norway) Marianne Rørvik	0	1	0	2	1	0	0	1	5
(Italy) Team Mariani	1	0	2	0	0	0	1	0	4

Sheet 3	1	2	3	4	5	6	7	8	Final
(Turkey) Dilşat Yıldız	0	0	2	1	0	2	1	X	6
(Switzerland) Zoe Schwaller	1	2	0	0	1	0	0	X	4

Sheet 4	1	2	3	4	5	6	7	8	Final
(Switzerland) Silvana Tirinzoni	2	0	1	2	2	2	X	X	9
(Austria) Verena Pflügler	0	1	0	0	0	0	X	X	1

Sheet 5	1	2	3	4	5	6	7	8	Final
(Switzerland) Nadine Bärtschiger	5	0	1	1	2	X	X	X	9
(Estonia) Liisa Turmann	0	1	0	0	0	X	X	X	1

=== Draw 3 ===
Friday, September 12, 4:00 pm

Sheet 1	1	2	3	4	5	6	7	8	Final
(Czech Republic) Kristyna Farková	0	0	2	0	1	2	1	X	6
(Germany) Sara Messenzehl	3	1	0	4	0	0	0	X	8

Sheet 3	1	2	3	4	5	6	7	8	Final
(Czech Republic) Hana Synáčková	1	0	1	4	0	4	X	X	10
(Switzerland) Corrie Hürlimann	0	0	0	0	1	0	X	X	1

Sheet 4	1	2	3	4	5	6	7	8	Final
(Switzerland) Johanna Blackham	0	1	0	2	0	X	X	X	3
(Norway) Torild Bjørnstad	2	0	3	0	4	X	X	X	9

Sheet 5	1	2	3	4	5	6	7	8	Final
(Switzerland) Elodie Jerger	1	0	0	3	0	0	1	0	5
(Italy) Stefania Constantini	0	2	1	0	1	1	0	2	7

=== Draw 4 ===
Friday, September 12, 7:30 pm

Sheet 1	1	2	3	4	5	6	7	8	Final
(Estonia) Liisa Turmann	0	1	0	0	0	0	X	X	1
(Switzerland) Silvana Tirinzoni	1	0	2	1	1	3	X	X	8

Sheet 2	1	2	3	4	5	6	7	8	Final
(Austria) Verena Pflügler	0	2	0	0	1	0	0	X	3
(Switzerland) Nadine Bärtschiger	1	0	2	1	0	1	1	X	6

Sheet 4	1	2	3	4	5	6	7	8	Final
(Switzerland) Zoe Schwaller	1	0	0	0	1	1	0	X	3
(Norway) Marianne Rørvik	0	3	1	1	0	0	2	X	7

Sheet 5	1	2	3	4	5	6	7	8	Final
(Italy) Team Mariani	0	0	0	1	0	1	0	X	2
(Turkey) Dilşat Yıldız	1	0	1	0	1	0	2	X	5

=== Draw 5 ===
Saturday, September 13, 8:00 am

Sheet 2	1	2	3	4	5	6	7	8	Final
(Germany) Sara Messenzehl	1	0	0	0	0	0	0	X	1
(Italy) Stefania Constantini	0	0	1	2	1	1	0	X	5

Sheet 3	1	2	3	4	5	6	7	8	Final
(Czech Republic) Kristyna Farková	0	0	1	1	0	0	0	X	2
(Switzerland) Elodie Jerger	0	1	0	0	2	2	1	X	6

Sheet 4	1	2	3	4	5	6	7	8	Final
(Norway) Torild Bjørnstad	0	2	0	0	3	0	2	1	8
(Switzerland) Corrie Hürlimann	0	0	3	1	0	3	0	0	7

Sheet 5	1	2	3	4	5	6	7	8	Final
(Switzerland) Johanna Blackham	0	2	0	2	0	0	2	X	6
(Czech Republic) Hana Synáčková	2	0	2	0	2	1	0	X	7

=== Draw 6 ===
Saturday, September 13, 11:30 am

Sheet 1	1	2	3	4	5	6	7	8	Final
(Turkey) Dilşat Yıldız	1	1	0	1	0	1	2	0	6
(Norway) Marianne Rørvik	0	0	4	0	2	0	0	1	7

Sheet 2	1	2	3	4	5	6	7	8	Final
(Italy) Team Mariani	0	1	0	1	2	0	0	1	5
(Switzerland) Zoe Schwaller	1	0	2	0	0	1	0	0	4

Sheet 3	1	2	3	4	5	6	7	8	Final
(Switzerland) Nadine Bärtschiger	1	0	2	0	1	0	0	X	4
(Switzerland) Silvana Tirinzoni	0	2	0	3	0	2	0	X	7

Sheet 4	1	2	3	4	5	6	7	8	Final
(Austria) Verena Pflügler	1	0	0	0	1	1	0	0	3
(Estonia) Liisa Turmann	0	0	1	2	0	0	1	1	5

== Crossover Games ==
=== Standings ===
Following the round robin, the teams ranked 5th to 12th played an extra ranking game to determine the final four teams to qualify for the playoffs.

Team	W	L	DSC
(Germany) Sara Messenzehl	2	2	9.22
(Switzerland) Nadine Bärtschiger	2	2	15.30
(Switzerland) Elodie Jerger	2	2	25.54
(Estonia) Liisa Turmann	2	2	49.76
(Italy) Team Mariani	2	2	53.96
(Switzerland) Corrie Hürlimann	2	2	59.56
(Czech Republic) Hana Synáčková	2	2	70.76
(Turkey) Dilşat Yıldız	2	2	109.66

=== Results ===
Saturday, September 13, 3:30 pm

Sheet 2	1	2	3	4	5	6	7	8	9	Final
(Turkey) Dilşat Yıldız	2	0	3	0	0	1	0	1	0	7
(Germany) Sara Messenzehl	0	1	0	3	2	0	1	0	1	8

Sheet 3	1	2	3	4	5	6	7	8	Final
(Czech Republic) Hana Synáčková	1	0	5	0	0	0	0	X	6
(Estonia) Liisa Turmann	0	4	0	1	1	1	2	X	9

Sheet 4	1	2	3	4	5	6	7	8	Final
(Switzerland) Elodie Jerger	3	1	0	0	0	0	1	0	5
(Italy) Team Mariani	0	0	1	2	0	2	0	1	6

Sheet 5	1	2	3	4	5	6	7	8	Final
(Switzerland) Nadine Bärtschiger	0	0	0	0	1	1	0	X	2
(Switzerland) Corrie Hürlimann	0	0	2	1	0	0	1	X	4

== Playoffs ==
Quarterfinals
1	(Norway) Torild Bjørnstad	6
8	(Estonia) Liisa Turmann	4
4	(Switzerland) Silvana Tirinzoni	10
5	(Germany) Sara Messenzehl	1
3	(Italy) Stefania Constantini	6
6	(Switzerland) Nadine Bärtschiger	5
2	(Norway) Marianne Rørvik	8
7	(Switzerland) Elodie Jerger	2

Semifinals
1	(Norway) Torild Bjørnstad	3
4	(Switzerland) Silvana Tirinzoni	9
3	(Italy) Stefania Constantini	9
2	(Norway) Marianne Rørvik	7

Final
4	(Switzerland) Silvana Tirinzoni	7
3	(Italy) Stefania Constantini	3

=== Quarterfinals ===
Saturday, September 13, 7:30 pm

Sheet 1	1	2	3	4	5	6	7	8	Final
(Switzerland) Silvana Tirinzoni	2	1	3	0	4	X	X	X	10
(Germany) Sara Messenzehl	0	0	0	1	0	X	X	X	1

Sheet 2	1	2	3	4	5	6	7	8	Final
(Norway) Torild Bjørnstad	0	1	0	0	4	1	0	X	6
(Estonia) Liisa Turmann	0	0	1	2	0	0	1	X	4

Sheet 4	1	2	3	4	5	6	7	8	Final
(Italy) Stefania Constantini	0	0	0	3	0	2	0	1	6
(Switzerland) Nadine Bärtschiger	0	2	1	0	1	0	1	0	5

Sheet 5	1	2	3	4	5	6	7	8	Final
(Norway) Marianne Rørvik	0	1	0	2	1	0	4	X	8
(Switzerland) Elodie Jerger	0	0	1	0	0	1	0	X	2

=== Semifinals ===
Sunday, September 14, 9:00 am

Sheet 2	1	2	3	4	5	6	7	8	Final
(Italy) Stefania Constantini	1	0	4	0	2	0	0	2	9
(Norway) Marianne Rørvik	0	2	0	3	0	2	0	0	7

Sheet 4	1	2	3	4	5	6	7	8	Final
(Norway) Torild Bjørnstad	0	2	0	0	1	0	X	X	3
(Switzerland) Silvana Tirinzoni	1	0	3	3	0	2	X	X	9

=== Final ===
Sunday, September 14, 12:30 pm

Sheet 3	1	2	3	4	5	6	7	8	Final
(Switzerland) Silvana Tirinzoni	0	0	4	0	3	0	X	X	7
(Italy) Stefania Constantini	0	1	0	1	0	1	X	X	3
