= Kang Bo-bae =

South Korean curler (born 2005)

- Curler
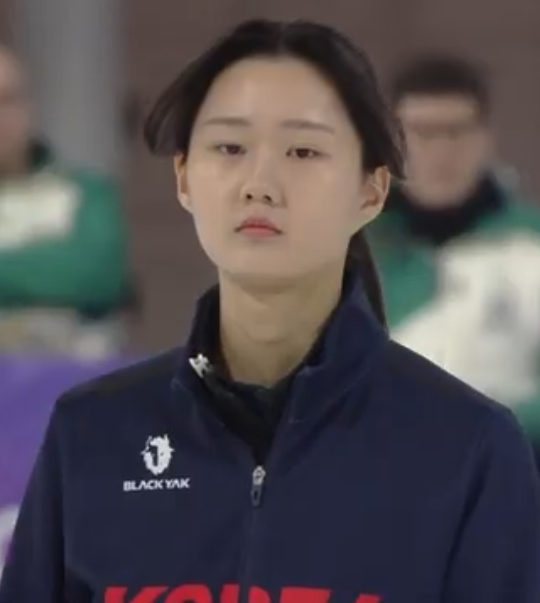
- At the 2025 Winter World University Games
- Born: June 12, 2005 (age 21); Uijeongbu, South Korea

Team
- Curling club: Jeonbuk CC, Jeonbuk
- Skip: Kim Kyeong-ae
- Third: Kim Min-seo
- Second: Shim Yu-jeong
- Lead: Kim Ji-soo
- Alternate: Kang Bo-bae
- Mixed doubles partner: Kim Hak-jun

Curling career
- Member Association: South Korea
- World Mixed Doubles Championship: 1 (2027)
- World Junior Curling Championship: 4 (2022, 2023, 2025, 2026)
- World Junior Mixed Doubles Curling Championship: 2 (2025, 2026)
Medal record
Women's curling
Representing South Korea
World Junior Championships
Gold medal – first place	2025 Cortina d'Ampezzo
Gold medal – first place	2026 Tårnby
World University Games
Silver medal – second place	2025 Turin
World Junior Mixed Doubles Championships
Bronze medal – third place	2025 Edmonton
Representing Jeonbuk
Korean Women's Championship
Bronze medal – third place	2025 Uijeongbu
Korean Mixed Doubles Championship
Gold medal – first place	2026 Uiseong

Kang Bo-bae (Korean: 강보배; born June 12, 2005, in Uijeongbu) is a South Korean curler from Jeonbuk. She is a two-time world junior champion skip (2025, 2026).

== Career ==
At just 16 years old, Kang made her international debut as skip of the Korean team at the 2022 World Junior Curling Championships. There, she led her team of Park Han-byul, Choi Ye-jin, Lee You-sun and Jo Ju-hee to a 3–6 record, relegating the country to the 2022 World Junior-B Curling Championships the following year. At the B championship, her team defeated Turkey 11–10 in the bronze medal game, finishing in the top three and securing their spot at the 2023 World Junior Curling Championships in Füssen, Germany. This time, the team went 4–5 in the round robin, finishing sixth place and avoiding relegation. The following season, however, her team lost the Korean Junior title to Kang's former teammate Park Han-byul and did not participate in the world championship.

After graduating high school, Kang was recruited to skip the Jeonbuk Province women's team with teammates Shim Yu-jeong, Kim Min-seo and Kim Ji-soo for the 2024–25 season. This team found immense success in their first season together, specifically on the Canadian tour, beginning by winning the Prestige Hotels & Resorts Curling Classic in October 2024. They continued this momentum into the following month, picking up two additional titles at the MCT Showdown and the DeKalb Superspiel, defeating countrymate and 2018 Olympic silver medalist Kim Eun-jung at the latter. They also finished runner-up at the S3 Group Curling Stadium Series to Xenia Schwaller.

By winning both the university and junior trials, Jeonbuk Province represented Korea at all international junior events during the season. In December 2024, Kang and her team won the 2024 World Junior-B Curling Championships, earning the right to compete in the 2025 World Junior Curling Championships. Before Worlds, though, the team played in the 2025 Winter World University Games where they topped the round robin standings with an 8–1 record. They then defeated Norway in the semifinal before coming up short against Japan in the final, settling for silver. At the World Junior Championship, Kang's rink finished 6–3 through the round robin, securing the third seed in the playoffs. They then beat Sweden in the semifinal before defeating Germany 8–2 in the championship game, securing Korea's first ever women's world junior title. At the end of the season, Kang teamed up with Kim Hak-jun to represent Korea at the inaugural 2025 World Junior Mixed Doubles Curling Championship. There, the team finished with a 7–2 record and earned the bronze medal, defeating Sweden 6–5.

To begin the 2025–26 season, Jeonbuk Province competed in the 2025 Korean Curling Championships. There, they had an impressive run, finishing 6–2 in the round robin and defeating Gangneung's Team Kim in both the round robin and 3 vs. 4 page playoff game. They ultimately lost in the semifinal to the eventual champion Gim Eun-ji, earning a bronze medal. On tour, Team Kang continued their momentum from the season prior, winning the Curling1spoon Elite 8 and finishing third at the 2025 Wakkanai Midori Challenge Cup in August. This early success earned them enough points to qualify for the 2025 Masters Tier 2 Grand Slam of Curling event where they lost in a tiebreaker to Tabitha Peterson. At the 2025 Autumn Gold Curling Classic, the team defeated the world number two ranked Silvana Tirinzoni rink twice en route to a semifinal finish. They also reached the playoffs at the 2025 Tour Challenge U25 Slam before losing to Fay Henderson. In November 2025, Team Kang competed in their first Tier 1 Slam at the 2025 GSOC Tahoe. Through the round robin, the team won two games over Sweden's Anna Hasselborg and Isabella Wranå, enough to qualify for a tiebreaker where they shutout Kerri Einarson 7–0. Advancing to the playoffs, the team lost in the quarterfinals to the top ranked Rachel Homan team. The team also qualified for the next Slam, the 2025 Canadian Open, where they lost in a tiebreaker to Momoha Tabata. To end the season, the team defended their title at the 2026 World Junior Curling Championships, finishing 8–1 through the round robin, and then going on to beat the United States in the semifinal and then Sweden's Moa Dryburgh 14–7 in the championship game. Kang also competed in the 2026 World Junior Mixed Doubles Curling Championship with Kim Hak-jun, however, lost in the quarterfinals to Scotland.

In the off season, the Korean women's teams saw significant changes following the dissolution of the Kim Eun-jung and Ha Seung-youn rinks. Team Kang remained intact for the 2026–27 season, however, added Team Kim third Kim Kyeong-ae to the lineup, shifting Shim Yu-jeong, Kim Ji-soo and Kim Min-seo to second, lead and alternate respectively. At the 2026 Korean Curling Championships, the team missed the playoffs with a 4–3 record. Following this, Kang and Kim Hak-jun won the Korean Mixed Doubles Curling Championship and became the Korean national team for the 2026–27 season. However, due to a new policy implemented by the Korean Curling Federation, Kang was not allowed to play with her women's team for the season and was to only focus on mixed doubles until the 2027 World Mixed Doubles Curling Championship.

== Personal life ==
Kang is originally from Gyeonggi Province but moved to Jeonbuk in 2024. She currently attends Korea National Open University. She previously attended Hoeryong Middle School and Songhyun High School.

== Grand Slam record ==
Key
C	Champion
F	Lost in Final
SF	Lost in Semifinal
QF	Lost in Quarterfinals
R16	Lost in the round of 16
Q	Did not advance to playoffs
T2	Played in Tier 2 event
DNP	Did not participate in event
N/A	Not a Grand Slam event that season

Event	2025–26
The National	QF
Canadian Open	Q

== Teams ==
Season	Skip	Third	Second	Lead	Alternate
2021–22	Kang Bo-bae	Park Han-byul	Choi Ye-jin	Lee You-sun	Jo Ju-hee
2022–23	Kang Bo-bae	Choi Ye-jin	Park Han-byul	Jo Ju-hee	Kim Na-yeon
2022–23	Kang Bo-bae	Jo Ju-hee	Kim Na-yeon	Lee You-sun	Cheon Hee-seo
2023–24	Kang Bo-bae	Jo Ju-hee	Lee Su-bin	Cheon Hee-seo	Hwang Ye-ji
2024–25	Kang Bo-bae	Jeong Jae-hee	Kim Min-seo	Kim Ji-soo	
2024–25	Kang Bo-bae	Kim Ji-soo	Shim Yu-jeong	Kim Min-seo	Lee Bo-young
2025–26	Kang Bo-bae	Shim Yu-jeong	Kim Min-seo	Kim Ji-soo	Lee Bo-young
2026–27	Kim Kyeong-ae	Kim Min-seo	Shim Yu-jeong	Kim Ji-soo	Kang Bo-bae
