= 2024 World Junior-B Curling Championships =

- Host city: Lohja, Finland
- Arena: Kisakallio Sports Institute
- Dates: December 8–19
- Men's winner: South Korea
- Skip: Kim Dae-hyun
- Third: Lee Woo-jung
- Second: Park Seong-min
- Lead: Kwon Juni
- Alternate: Shin Eun-jun
- Coach: Kim Chi-gu
- Finalist: Switzerland (Lüthold)
- Women's winner: South Korea
- Skip: Kang Bo-bae
- Third: Kim Ji-soo
- Second: Shim Yu-jeong
- Lead: Kim Min-seo
- Coach: Kwon Young-il
- Finalist: Latvia (Barone)

The 2024 World Junior-B Curling Championships were held from December 8 to 19 at the Kisakallio Sports Institute in Lohja, Finland. The top three men's teams (South Korea, Switzerland, Japan) and top three women's teams (South Korea, Latvia, China) qualified for the 2025 World Junior Curling Championships in Cortina d'Ampezzo, Italy.

== Men ==
=== Teams ===
The teams are listed as follows:

Australia	Austria	Bolivia	Brazil	China
Fourth: Thomas Bence; Skip: Flynn Collins; Second: Matthew Quinn; Lead: Daniel Collins	Skip: Matthäus Hofer; Third: David Zott; Second: Florian Kramlinger; Lead: Johannes Kramlinger; Alternate: Christoph Neumayr	Skip: Jim Espinoza; Third: Yerko Castro; Second: Emerson Balboa; Lead: Cody Tinta	Skip: Pedro Ribeiro; Third: Nuno Rodrigues; Second: Guilherme Melo; Lead: Arthur Camelo; Alternate: John Grainge	Skip: Liu Guangshen; Third: Yu Sen; Second: Zhu Yupeng; Lead: Yan Jisong; Alternate: Li Yang
Chinese Taipei	Czech Republic	England	Japan	Latvia
Skip: Samuel Chang; Third: Jin Hui-lun; Second: Chen Shou-yi; Lead: Lin Hui-en	Fourth: Krystof Žd’árský; Skip: Šimon Pěnička; Second: Matěj Kaska; Lead: Tomáš Krátky; Alternate: Daniel Tahal	Skip: Matthew Waring; Third: Callum McLain; Second: Benjamin Gillard; Lead: Troy Caunce; Alternate: Benjamin Holcombe	Skip: Toa Nakahara; Third: Hinata Michitani; Second: Riku Takemura; Lead: Yuta Kimura; Alternate: Shunta Kobayashi	Skip: Kristaps Zass; Third: Eduards Seļiverstovs; Second: Toms Sondors; Lead: Deniss Smirnovs; Alternate: Raimonds Vaivods
New Zealand	Philippines	Poland	Romania	Slovakia
Skip: Darcy Nevill; Third: Willian Loe; Second: Jack Steele; Lead: Jack Millar; Alternate: Ben Kinney	Skip: Dylan Skaggs; Third: Tyler Skaggs; Second: Felix Hester; Lead: Elijah Mojado	Skip: Antoni Frynia; Third: Kacper Mucha; Second: Bartlomiej Mosiolek; Lead: Jan Witkowski; Alternate: Filip Wojciechowski	Fourth: Tudor Pop; Third: Toma Matei Felecan; Skip: Dan Ghergie; Lead: Tudor Mihalca; Alternate: Catalin Vancea	Skip: Sebastián Trajanov; Third: Stanislav Mashutin; Second: Samuel Ščevlík; Lead: Samuel Vavrovič; Alternate: Radovan Schüller
Slovenia	South Korea	Spain	Sweden	Switzerland
Fourth: Maks Omerzel; Skip: Gasper Govar Kocevar; Second: Bor Gmajnar; Lead: Vid Berlot	Skip: Kim Dae-hyun; Third: Lee Woo-jung; Second: Park Seong-min; Lead: Kwon Juni; Alternate: Shin Eun-jun	Skip: Javier Carasa; Third: Eneko Sáez de Ocáriz; Second: Aleksei Palacín; Lead: Pablo López; Alternate: Alejandro Cardona	Skip: Vilmer Nygren; Third: Alexander Dryburgh; Second: Dante Alexander; Lead: Jonatan Meyerson; Alternate: Ture Rodling	Skip: Felix Lüthold; Third: Leon Wittich; Second: Livio Ernst; Lead: Jonas Feierabend; Alternate: Timon Biehle
Turkey	Ukraine			
Skip: Mehmet Fatih Bayramoğlu; Third: Muhammed Taha Zenit; Second: Emre Can Karakurt; Lead: Oğuzhan Kaya; Alternate: Muhammed Ali Karahan	Skip: Eduard Nikolov; Third: Artem Suhak; Second: Vladyslav Koval; Lead: Artem Hasynets			

=== Round robin standings ===
Final Round Robin Standings

Key
Teams to Playoffs

Group A	Skip	W	L	W–L	DSC
South Korea	Kim Dae-hyun	6	1	1–0	43.59
Sweden	Vilmer Nygren	6	1	0–1	57.63
Poland	Antoni Frynia	5	2	–	92.79
Latvia	Kristaps Zass	4	3	1–0	70.73
Austria	Matthäus Hofer	4	3	0–1	72.63
Philippines	Dylan Skaggs	2	5	–	90.88
Brazil	Pedro Ribeiro	1	6	–	132.78
Bolivia	Jim Espinoza	0	7	–	199.60

Group B	Skip	W	L	W–L	DSC
Japan	Toa Nakahara	6	0	–	39.01
China	Liu Guangshen	5	1	–	53.84
Turkey	Mehmet Fatih Bayramoğlu	4	2	–	73.62
Spain	Javier Carasa	2	4	1–1	67.73
Australia	Flynn Collins	2	4	1–1	100.49
Romania	Dan Ghergie	2	4	1–1	134.73
Slovenia	Gasper Govar Kocevar	0	6	–	97.56

Group C	Skip	W	L	W–L	DSC
Switzerland	Felix Lüthold	6	0	–	27.63
Ukraine	Eduard Nikolov	5	1	–	27.40
England	Matthew Waring	4	2	–	43.42
Czech Republic	Šimon Pěnička	3	3	–	54.99
New Zealand	Darcy Nevill	2	4	–	91.09
Slovakia	Sebastián Trajanov	1	5	–	92.09
Chinese Taipei	Samuel Chang	0	6	–	157.33

Ranking of 3rd Place Teams	Skip	Group	DSC
England	Matthew Waring	C	43.42
Turkey	Mehmet Fatih Bayramoğlu	B	73.62
Poland	Antoni Frynia	A	92.79

Group A Round Robin Summary Table
Pos.	Country	Austria	Bolivia	Brazil	Latvia	Philippines	Poland	South Korea	Sweden	Record
5	Austria	—	W–L	9–2	2–7	4–3	4–3	2–9	1–11	4–3
8	Bolivia	L–W	—	2–18	0–25	L–W	L–W	1–22	1–15	0–7
7	Brazil	2–9	18–2	—	3–10	6–7	3–10	2–14	2–10	1–6
4	Latvia	7–2	25–0	10–3	—	10–2	3–6	2–5	4–6	4–3
6	Philippines	3–4	W–L	7–6	2–10	—	4–5	5–6	3–15	2–5
3	Poland	3–4	W–L	10–3	6–3	5–4	—	5–4	5–7	5–2
1	South Korea	9–2	22–1	14–2	5–2	6–5	4–5	—	7–6	6–1
2	Sweden	11–1	15–1	10–2	6–4	15–3	7–5	6–7	—	6–1

Group B Round Robin Summary Table
Pos.	Country	Australia	China	Japan	Romania	Slovenia	Spain	Turkey	Record
5	Australia	—	2–9	4–8	7–1	7–6	5–9	2–10	2–4
2	China	9–2	—	5–6	12–2	8–2	9–2	7–3	5–1
1	Japan	8–4	6–5	—	7–1	10–2	4–2	7–3	6–0
6	Romania	1–7	2–12	1–7	—	10–5	4–3	4–8	2–4
7	Slovenia	6–7	2–8	2–10	5–10	—	6–8	2–9	0–6
4	Spain	9–5	2–9	2–4	3–4	8–6	—	3–6	2–4
3	Turkey	10–2	3–7	3–7	8–4	9–2	6–3	—	4–2

Group C Round Robin Summary Table
Pos.	Country	Chinese Taipei	Czech Republic	England	New Zealand	Slovakia	Switzerland	Ukraine	Record
7	Chinese Taipei	—	1–22	1–10	3–11	4–13	6–11	4–19	0–6
4	Czech Republic	22–1	—	3–7	6–1	11–1	2–8	4–5	3–3
3	England	10–1	7–3	—	5–4	7–2	5–7	3–5	4–2
5	New Zealand	11–3	1–6	4–5	—	9–2	2–8	3–9	2–4
6	Slovakia	13–4	1–11	2–7	2–9	—	1–11	2–12	1–5
1	Switzerland	11–6	8–2	7–5	8–2	11–1	—	8–3	6–0
2	Ukraine	19–4	5–4	5–3	9–3	12–2	3–8	—	5–1

=== Round robin results ===
All draw times are listed in Eastern European Time (UTC+02:00).

==== Draw 1 ====
Sunday, December 8, 9:00

Sheet A	1	2	3	4	5	6	7	8	Final
Poland (Frynia) 🔨	1	0	1	0	2	0	2	X	6
Latvia (Zass)	0	1	0	1	0	1	0	X	3

Sheet C	Final
Bolivia (Espinoza)	L
Philippines (Skaggs)	W

Sheet E	1	2	3	4	5	6	7	8	Final
Brazil (Ribeiro)	0	0	0	1	0	0	1	X	2
South Korea (Kim) 🔨	5	1	4	0	3	1	0	X	14

Sheet B	1	2	3	4	5	6	7	8	Final
Sweden (Nygren) 🔨	2	1	2	3	0	3	X	X	11
Austria (Hofer)	0	0	0	0	1	0	X	X	1

Sheet D	1	2	3	4	5	6	7	8	Final
Spain (Carasa) 🔨	0	0	2	0	3	0	1	3	9
Australia (Collins)	2	1	0	2	0	0	0	0	5

==== Draw 2 ====
Sunday, December 8, 14:00

Sheet A	1	2	3	4	5	6	7	8	Final
Turkey (Bayramoğlu)	1	3	2	0	0	2	1	X	9
Slovenia (Govar Kocevar) 🔨	0	0	0	1	1	0	0	X	2

Sheet C	1	2	3	4	5	6	7	8	Final
Slovakia (Trajanov) 🔨	0	0	0	0	2	0	0	X	2
England (Waring)	1	0	1	1	0	3	1	X	7

Sheet E	1	2	3	4	5	6	7	8	Final
New Zealand (Nevill)	0	0	0	1	0	0	X	X	1
Czech Republic (Pěnička) 🔨	1	1	2	0	1	1	X	X	6

Sheet B	1	2	3	4	5	6	7	8	Final
Ukraine (Nikolov)	0	1	0	0	0	2	X	X	3
Switzerland (Lüthold) 🔨	2	0	2	2	2	0	X	X	8

Sheet D	1	2	3	4	5	6	7	8	Final
China (Liu)	2	0	0	1	0	0	2	0	5
Japan (Nakahara) 🔨	0	2	2	0	0	1	0	1	6

==== Draw 3 ====
Sunday, December 8, 19:00

Sheet A	1	2	3	4	5	6	7	8	Final
Brazil (Ribeiro)	0	1	0	0	1	0	0	X	2
Sweden (Nygren) 🔨	3	0	1	1	0	2	3	X	10

Sheet C	1	2	3	4	5	6	7	8	Final
Austria (Hofer)	0	0	1	0	1	0	0	X	2
Latvia (Zass) 🔨	2	0	0	3	0	1	1	X	7

Sheet E	1	2	3	4	5	6	7	8	Final
Slovenia (Govar Kocevar)	0	1	0	0	1	0	X	X	2
Japan (Nakahara) 🔨	4	0	1	4	0	1	X	X	10

Sheet B	Final
Poland (Frynia)	W
Bolivia (Espinoza)	L

Sheet D	1	2	3	4	5	6	7	8	Final
South Korea (Kim) 🔨	1	0	1	0	1	3	0	0	6
Philippines (Skaggs)	0	1	0	1	0	0	2	1	5

==== Draw 4 ====
Monday, December 9, 9:00

Sheet A	1	2	3	4	5	6	7	8	Final
Czech Republic (Pěnička)	0	0	1	0	0	1	X	X	2
Switzerland (Lüthold) 🔨	3	0	0	0	5	0	X	X	8

Sheet C	1	2	3	4	5	6	7	8	Final
Romania (Ghergie)	1	2	0	1	0	0	0	X	4
Turkey (Bayramoğlu) 🔨	0	0	1	0	3	2	2	X	8

Sheet E	1	2	3	4	5	6	7	8	Final
Spain (Carasa) 🔨	0	1	0	0	1	0	0	X	2
China (Liu)	4	0	0	0	0	2	3	X	9

Sheet B	1	2	3	4	5	6	7	8	Final
New Zealand (Nevill) 🔨	2	1	1	1	0	0	4	X	9
Slovakia (Trajanov)	0	0	0	0	1	1	0	X	2

Sheet D	1	2	3	4	5	6	7	8	Final
Chinese Taipei (Chang)	0	0	0	1	0	0	X	X	1
England (Waring) 🔨	2	2	3	0	2	1	X	X	10

==== Draw 5 ====
Monday, December 9, 14:00

Sheet A	Final
Bolivia (Espinoza)	L
Austria (Hofer)	W

Sheet C	1	2	3	4	5	6	7	8	9	Final
South Korea (Kim) 🔨	0	0	0	1	0	2	0	1	0	4
Poland (Frynia)	0	0	0	0	2	0	2	0	1	5

Sheet E	1	2	3	4	5	6	7	8	Final
Philippines (Skaggs)	0	0	0	0	3	0	X	X	3
Sweden (Nygren) 🔨	2	3	4	3	0	3	X	X	15

Sheet B	1	2	3	4	5	6	7	8	Final
Japan (Nakahara) 🔨	2	0	4	1	0	0	X	X	7
Turkey (Bayramoğlu)	0	1	0	0	2	0	X	X	3

Sheet D	1	2	3	4	5	6	7	8	Final
Brazil (Ribeiro)	0	1	0	1	0	1	0	X	3
Latvia (Zass) 🔨	3	0	2	0	4	0	1	X	10

==== Draw 6 ====
Monday, December 9, 19:00

Sheet A	1	2	3	4	5	6	7	8	Final
Chinese Taipei (Chang)	0	0	3	0	0	1	0	X	4
Slovakia (Trajanov) 🔨	1	4	0	1	3	0	4	X	13

Sheet C	1	2	3	4	5	6	7	8	Final
Spain (Carasa) 🔨	4	0	0	1	0	0	0	3	8
Slovenia (Govar Kocevar)	0	0	2	0	2	1	1	0	6

Sheet E	1	2	3	4	5	6	7	8	Final
Romania (Ghergie)	0	1	0	0	0	0	0	X	1
Australia (Collins) 🔨	1	0	1	1	2	1	1	X	7

Sheet B	1	2	3	4	5	6	7	8	Final
England (Waring) 🔨	2	0	2	0	2	0	1	X	7
Czech Republic (Pěnička)	0	1	0	1	0	1	0	X	3

Sheet D	1	2	3	4	5	6	7	8	Final
Ukraine (Nikolov) 🔨	2	3	0	2	0	2	X	X	9
New Zealand (Nevill)	0	0	2	0	1	0	X	X	3

==== Draw 7 ====
Tuesday, December 10, 9:00

Sheet A	1	2	3	4	5	6	7	8	Final
England (Waring)	0	1	0	0	1	0	1	X	3
Ukraine (Nikolov) 🔨	0	0	2	1	0	2	0	X	5

Sheet C	1	2	3	4	5	6	7	8	Final
Czech Republic (Pěnička) 🔨	5	4	0	4	6	3	X	X	22
Chinese Taipei (Chang)	0	0	1	0	0	0	X	X	1

Sheet E	1	2	3	4	5	6	7	8	Final
Switzerland (Lüthold) 🔨	1	2	0	1	2	5	X	X	11
Slovakia (Trajanov)	0	0	1	0	0	0	X	X	1

Sheet B	1	2	3	4	5	6	7	8	Final
China (Liu) 🔨	1	1	0	4	1	0	2	X	9
Australia (Collins)	0	0	2	0	0	0	0	X	2

Sheet D	1	2	3	4	5	6	7	8	Final
Turkey (Bayramoğlu)	0	1	2	0	2	1	0	X	6
Spain (Carasa) 🔨	0	0	0	2	0	0	1	X	3

==== Draw 8 ====
Tuesday, December 10, 14:00

Sheet A	1	2	3	4	5	6	7	8	Final
Latvia (Zass) 🔨	1	0	0	1	0	0	0	0	2
South Korea (Kim)	0	1	1	0	0	1	0	2	5

Sheet C	1	2	3	4	5	6	7	8	Final
Sweden (Nygren) 🔨	4	2	0	5	4	0	X	X	15
Bolivia (Espinoza)	0	0	0	0	0	1	X	X	1

Sheet E	1	2	3	4	5	6	7	8	Final
Poland (Frynia) 🔨	2	0	4	0	2	2	X	X	10
Brazil (Ribeiro)	0	2	0	1	0	0	X	X	3

Sheet B	1	2	3	4	5	6	7	8	Final
Austria (Hofer) 🔨	0	0	0	0	1	0	2	1	4
Philippines (Skaggs)	1	1	0	0	0	1	0	0	3

Sheet D	1	2	3	4	5	6	7	8	Final
Slovenia (Govar Kocevar) 🔨	0	0	2	0	0	3	0	X	5
Romania (Ghergie)	2	1	0	3	2	0	2	X	10

==== Draw 9 ====
Tuesday, December 10, 19:00

Sheet A	1	2	3	4	5	6	7	8	Final
Australia (Collins)	0	1	0	0	1	0	X	X	2
Turkey (Bayramoğlu) 🔨	2	0	3	1	0	4	X	X	10

Sheet C	1	2	3	4	5	6	7	8	Final
Japan (Nakahara)	0	1	1	0	1	0	1	X	4
Spain (Carasa) 🔨	1	0	0	1	0	0	0	X	2

Sheet E	1	2	3	4	5	6	7	8	Final
Chinese Taipei (Chang) 🔨	0	0	0	0	0	3	X	X	3
New Zealand (Nevill)	2	2	4	2	1	0	X	X	11

Sheet B	1	2	3	4	5	6	7	8	Final
Slovakia (Trajanov)	0	0	2	0	0	0	X	X	2
Ukraine (Nikolov) 🔨	2	2	0	3	3	2	X	X	12

Sheet D	1	2	3	4	5	6	7	8	Final
England (Waring)	0	3	0	0	1	0	0	1	5
Switzerland (Lüthold) 🔨	0	0	1	2	0	1	3	0	7

==== Draw 10 ====
Wednesday, December 11, 9:00

Sheet A	1	2	3	4	5	6	7	8	Final
China (Liu) 🔨	4	2	1	1	2	0	2	X	12
Romania (Ghergie)	0	0	0	0	0	2	0	X	2

Sheet C	1	2	3	4	5	6	7	8	Final
Philippines (Skaggs) 🔨	1	2	1	0	2	1	0	0	7
Brazil (Ribeiro)	0	0	0	2	0	0	2	2	6

Sheet E	1	2	3	4	5	6	7	8	Final
Latvia (Zass) 🔨	4	3	4	5	7	2	X	X	25
Bolivia (Espinoza)	0	0	0	0	0	0	X	X	0

Sheet B	1	2	3	4	5	6	7	8	9	Final
South Korea (Kim)	0	0	3	0	0	2	1	0	1	7
Sweden (Nygren) 🔨	1	3	0	1	0	0	0	1	0	6

Sheet D	1	2	3	4	5	6	7	8	Final
Austria (Hofer) 🔨	1	0	2	0	0	0	0	1	4
Poland (Frynia)	0	1	0	1	0	1	0	0	3

==== Draw 11 ====
Wednesday, December 11, 14:00

Sheet A	1	2	3	4	5	6	7	8	Final
Ukraine (Nikolov) 🔨	5	5	4	0	5	0	X	X	19
Chinese Taipei (Chang)	0	0	0	2	0	2	X	X	4

Sheet C	1	2	3	4	5	6	7	8	Final
Switzerland (Lüthold) 🔨	2	0	3	1	0	2	X	X	8
New Zealand (Nevill)	0	2	0	0	0	0	X	X	2

Sheet E	1	2	3	4	5	6	7	8	Final
Japan (Nakahara) 🔨	2	1	2	1	0	0	1	X	7
Romania (Ghergie)	0	0	0	0	1	0	0	X	1

Sheet B	1	2	3	4	5	6	7	8	Final
Australia (Collins) 🔨	0	0	0	4	2	1	0	0	7
Slovenia (Govar Kocevar)	1	1	2	0	0	0	1	1	6

Sheet D	1	2	3	4	5	6	7	8	Final
Slovakia (Trajanov)	0	0	0	0	1	0	X	X	1
Czech Republic (Pěnička) 🔨	0	3	2	2	0	4	X	X	11

==== Draw 12 ====
Wednesday, December 11, 19:00

Sheet A	1	2	3	4	5	6	7	8	Final
Philippines (Skaggs)	0	2	0	0	0	0	1	1	4
Poland (Frynia) 🔨	2	0	1	0	0	2	0	0	5

Sheet C	1	2	3	4	5	6	7	8	Final
Turkey (Bayramoğlu) 🔨	0	1	0	1	0	1	0	0	3
China (Liu)	1	0	2	0	1	0	1	2	7

Sheet E	1	2	3	4	5	6	7	8	Final
South Korea (Kim)	0	2	3	0	0	2	2	X	9
Austria (Hofer) 🔨	1	0	0	1	0	0	0	X	2

Sheet B	1	2	3	4	5	6	7	8	Final
Bolivia (Espinoza)	0	0	0	0	0	2	X	X	2
Brazil (Ribeiro) 🔨	4	3	5	2	4	0	X	X	18

Sheet D	1	2	3	4	5	6	7	8	Final
Latvia (Zass)	0	0	1	2	0	0	1	0	4
Sweden (Nygren) 🔨	2	1	0	0	0	2	0	1	6

==== Draw 13 ====
Thursday, December 12, 8:00

Sheet A	1	2	3	4	5	6	7	8	Final
New Zealand (Nevill)	0	2	0	0	0	1	1	0	4
England (Waring) 🔨	0	0	3	1	0	0	0	1	5

Sheet C	1	2	3	4	5	6	7	8	Final
Australia (Collins)	0	1	0	0	2	0	1	X	4
Japan (Nakahara) 🔨	2	0	3	1	0	2	0	X	8

Sheet E	1	2	3	4	5	6	7	8	Final
Czech Republic (Pěnička) 🔨	0	0	0	1	0	0	3	0	4
Ukraine (Nikolov)	0	2	1	0	0	1	0	1	5

Sheet B	1	2	3	4	5	6	7	8	Final
Romania (Ghergie)	0	0	1	0	1	0	0	2	4
Spain (Carasa) 🔨	0	2	0	0	0	0	1	0	3

Sheet D	1	2	3	4	5	6	7	8	Final
Switzerland (Lüthold) 🔨	5	2	0	1	3	0	X	X	11
Chinese Taipei (Chang)	0	0	1	0	0	5	X	X	6

==== Draw 14 ====
Thursday, December 12, 12:00

Sheet A	1	2	3	4	5	6	7	8	Final
Slovenia (Govar Kocevar)	0	0	1	0	1	0	0	X	2
China (Liu) 🔨	4	1	0	2	0	1	0	X	8

Sheet C	1	2	3	4	5	6	7	8	Final
Brazil (Ribeiro)	1	0	0	0	1	0	X	X	2
Austria (Hofer) 🔨	0	3	1	4	0	1	X	X	9

Sheet E	1	2	3	4	5	6	7	8	Final
Sweden (Nygren)	1	3	0	1	0	2	0	0	7
Poland (Frynia) 🔨	0	0	2	0	1	0	1	1	5

Sheet B	1	2	3	4	5	6	7	8	Final
Philippines (Skaggs)	0	0	2	0	0	0	0	X	2
Latvia (Zass) 🔨	4	1	0	1	1	1	2	X	10

Sheet D	1	2	3	4	5	6	7	8	Final
Bolivia (Espinoza)	1	0	0	0	0	0	X	X	1
South Korea (Kim) 🔨	0	6	4	4	2	6	X	X	22

=== Playoffs ===
Quarterfinals
1	Switzerland	6
8	Turkey	3
4	Ukraine	1
5	China	10
3	South Korea	4
6	Sweden	2
2	Japan	6
7	England	3

Semifinals
1	Switzerland	5
5	China	4
3	South Korea	9
2	Japan	6

Gold medal game
1	Switzerland	3
3	South Korea	4
Third place
5	China	2
2	Japan	7

==== Quarterfinals ====
Thursday, December 12, 19:00

Sheet A	1	2	3	4	5	6	7	8	Final
South Korea (Kim)	0	1	0	1	0	2	0	X	4
Sweden (Nygren) 🔨	0	0	1	0	0	0	1	X	2

Sheet B	1	2	3	4	5	6	7	8	Final
Japan (Nakahara) 🔨	1	0	0	1	0	2	0	2	6
England (Waring)	0	0	1	0	1	0	1	0	3

Sheet C	1	2	3	4	5	6	7	8	Final
Switzerland (Lüthold)	1	0	2	1	0	1	0	1	6
Turkey (Bayramoğlu) 🔨	0	1	0	0	1	0	1	0	3

Sheet D	1	2	3	4	5	6	7	8	Final
Ukraine (Nikolov)	0	0	0	0	0	1	X	X	1
China (Liu) 🔨	3	3	2	1	1	0	X	X	10

==== Semifinals ====
Friday, December 13, 10:00

Sheet A	1	2	3	4	5	6	7	8	Final
Switzerland (Lüthold)	0	2	0	0	0	2	0	1	5
China (Liu) 🔨	1	0	0	2	0	0	1	0	4

Sheet D	1	2	3	4	5	6	7	8	Final
South Korea (Kim)	2	0	2	3	1	0	0	1	9
Japan (Nakahara) 🔨	0	2	0	0	0	3	1	0	6

==== Bronze medal game ====
Friday, December 13, 16:00

Sheet B	1	2	3	4	5	6	7	8	Final
China (Liu)	0	0	0	0	0	2	0	0	2
Japan (Nakahara) 🔨	0	1	0	1	1	0	1	3	7

==== Gold medal game ====
Friday, December 13, 16:00

Sheet C	1	2	3	4	5	6	7	8	Final
Switzerland (Lüthold) 🔨	0	1	0	0	2	0	0	0	3
South Korea (Kim)	0	0	3	0	0	0	0	1	4

=== Final standings ===
Key
Teams Advance to the 2025 World Junior Curling Championships

Place	Team
1st place, gold medalist(s)	South Korea
2nd place, silver medalist(s)	Switzerland
3rd place, bronze medalist(s)	Japan
4	China
5	England
5	Sweden
5	Turkey
5	Ukraine
9	Poland
10	Czech Republic
11	Spain
12	Latvia
13	Austria
14	New Zealand
15	Australia
16	Philippines
17	Slovakia
18	Romania
19	Slovenia
20	Brazil
21	Chinese Taipei
22	Bolivia

== Women ==
=== Teams ===
The teams are listed as follows:

Australia	Austria	Brazil	China	Croatia
Skip: Holly Douglas; Third: Molly Baker; Second: Brydie Douglas; Lead: Chiara Nathan; Alternate: Marcy Forge	Skip: Emma Müller; Third: Hannah Wittibschlaeger; Second: Elisa Kaar; Lead: Leonie Fuchs	Fourth: Isis Regadas; Skip: Julia Gentile; Second: Melissa de Castro Sampaio; Lead: Ana Teodoro; Alternate: Rafaela Ladeira	Skip: Li Ziru; Third: Gao Ya; Second: Tian Dingning; Lead: Chen Zaoxue; Alternate: Wang Jiayi	Skip: Luči Ana Pavelka; Third: Paula Princip; Second: Jelena Bukvić; Lead: Lucija Matani; Alternate: Morana Cuzela
Czech Republic	Denmark	England	Finland	Hungary
Fourth: Julie Zelingrová; Skip: Kristýna Farková; Second: Ema Košáková; Lead: Stella Svitáková; Alternate: Sofie Krupičková	Skip: Katrine Schmidt; Third: Emilie Holtermann; Second: Ninne Vilandt; Lead: Maja Nyboe; Alternate: Sophie Chang	Fourth: Lina Opel; Skip: Marianna Ward; Second: Anna MacDougall; Lead: Helena Kiggell; Alternate: Phoenix Davies	Fourth: Lara Sajaniemi; Skip: Mariia Kiiskinen; Second: Maria Olszewska; Lead: Ida Kokkonen; Alternate: Elaina Sajaniemi	Fourth: Laura Lauchsz; Skip: Hanna Orbán; Second: Dorina Dencso; Lead: Emma Szurmay; Alternate: Panna Barna
Latvia	Lithuania	New Zealand	Poland	Romania
Skip: Evelīna Barone; Third: Rēzija Ieviņa; Second: Veronika Apse; Lead: Marija Seliverstova; Alternate: Letīcija Ieviņa	Skip: Migle Kiudyte; Third: Nika Shilova; Second: Urte Venslaviciute; Lead: Meda Kiudyte	Skip: Olivia Russell; Third: Ellie McKenzie; Second: Trinity Cowie; Lead: Isobel Day; Alternate: Tylah James	Skip: Magdalena Herman; Third: Paulina Frysz; Second: Julia Jawien; Lead: Malgorzata Frysz	Fourth: Sorana Pop; Third: Emma Ganea; Skip: Ania Bacali; Lead: Emma Isai; Alternate: Elisa Guttman
Scotland	Slovenia	South Korea	Spain	Turkey
Skip: Callie Soutar; Third: Eva Hare; Second: Holly Clemie; Lead: Alison Hamilton; Alternate: Cara Davidson	Skip: Ema Kavčič; Third: Pavla Kavčič; Second: Maja Kučina; Lead: Lana Zaveljcina; Alternate: Neža Brina Gmajnar	Skip: Kang Bo-bae; Third: Kim Ji-soo; Second: Shim Yu-jeong; Lead: Kim Min-seo	Skip: Leyre Torralba; Third: Daniela García; Second: Leire Carasa; Lead: Laura Rodríguez; Alternate: Emma López	Skip: Nurefşan Yaşarbaş; Third: Sudenur Öztürk; Second: Burcu Haşıl; Lead: Zeynep Genç; Alternate: Şeydanur Morkoç
United States				
Skip: Allie Giroux; Third: Tessa Thurlow; Second: Ella Fleming; Lead: Savannah Koch; Alternate: Brooke Giroux				

=== Round robin standings ===
Final Round Robin Standings

Key
Teams to Playoffs

Group A	Skip	W	L	W–L	DSC
Scotland	Callie Soutar	6	0	–	52.93
Denmark	Katrine Schmidt	5	1	–	44.58
Turkey	Nurefşan Yaşarbaş	4	2	–	54.00
England	Marianna Ward	3	3	–	104.03
Brazil	Julia Gentile	2	4	–	43.51
Finland	Mariia Kiiskinen	1	5	–	130.19
Australia	Holly Douglas	0	6	–	116.22

Group B	Skip	W	L	W–L	DSC
China	Li Ziru	6	0	–	43.32
United States	Allie Giroux	5	1	–	48.91
Hungary	Hanna Orbán	3	3	1–0	51.39
Spain	Leyre Torralba	3	3	0–1	43.13
Slovenia	Ema Kavčič	2	4	1–0	77.03
Romania	Ania Bacali	2	4	0–1	150.53
Croatia	Luči Ana Pavelka	0	6	–	143.94

Group C	Skip	W	L	W–L	DSC
Latvia	Evelīna Barone	6	0	–	53.75
South Korea	Kang Bo-bae	5	1	–	34.52
Czech Republic	Kristýna Farková	4	2	–	72.12
Lithuania	Migle Kiudyte	3	3	–	108.90
Poland	Magdalena Herman	1	5	1–1	87.15
Austria	Emma Müller	1	5	1–1	89.78
New Zealand	Olivia Russell	1	5	1–1	92.13

Ranking of 3rd Place Teams	Skip	Group	DSC
Hungary	Hanna Orbán	B	51.39
Turkey	Nurefşan Yaşarbaş	A	54.00
Czech Republic	Kristýna Farková	C	72.12

Group A Round Robin Summary Table
Pos.	Country	Australia	Brazil	Denmark	England	Finland	Scotland	Turkey	Record
7	Australia	—	0–10	2–7	6–11	5–15	2–14	5–10	0–6
5	Brazil	10–0	—	3–7	5–6	7–4	3–6	2–9	2–4
2	Denmark	7–2	7–3	—	8–4	12–0	4–10	7–6	5–1
4	England	11–6	6–5	4–8	—	7–3	5–8	2–12	3–3
6	Finland	15–5	4–7	0–12	3–7	—	4–9	5–13	1–5
1	Scotland	14–2	6–3	10–4	8–5	9–4	—	9–2	6–0
3	Turkey	10–5	9–2	6–7	12–2	13–5	2–9	—	4–2

Group B Round Robin Summary Table
Pos.	Country	China	Croatia	Hungary	Romania	Slovenia	Spain	United States	Record
1	China	—	15–1	8–0	11–2	7–2	10–3	9–3	6–0
7	Croatia	1–15	—	4–10	3–6	10–11	4–8	2–13	0–6
3	Hungary	0–8	10–4	—	3–7	8–6	7–6	3–8	3–3
6	Romania	2–11	6–3	7–3	—	1–12	2–12	1–13	2–4
5	Slovenia	2–7	11–10	6–8	12–1	—	3–10	2–10	2–4
4	Spain	3–10	8–4	6–7	12–2	10–3	—	2–7	3–3
2	United States	3–9	13–2	8–3	13–1	10–2	7–2	—	5–1

Group C Round Robin Summary Table
Pos.	Country	Austria	Czech Republic	Latvia	Lithuania	New Zealand	Poland	South Korea	Record
6	Austria	—	2–10	2–8	3–8	10–6	5–6	2–10	1–5
3	Czech Republic	10–2	—	5–9	11–2	4–3	6–3	2–7	4–2
1	Latvia	8–2	9–5	—	9–3	7–1	12–1	9–7	6–0
4	Lithuania	8–3	2–11	3–9	—	8–5	8–7	1–10	3–3
7	New Zealand	6–10	3–4	1–7	5–8	—	10–5	1–12	1–5
5	Poland	6–5	3–6	1–12	7–8	5–10	—	2–9	1–5
2	South Korea	10–2	7–2	7–9	10–1	12–1	9–2	—	5–1

=== Round robin results ===
All draw times are listed in Eastern European Time (UTC+02:00).

==== Draw 1 ====
Sunday, December 15, 8:00

Sheet A	1	2	3	4	5	6	7	8	Final
China (Li) 🔨	2	1	0	5	0	3	X	X	11
Romania (Bacali)	0	0	1	0	1	0	X	X	2

Sheet C	1	2	3	4	5	6	7	8	Final
Finland (Kiiskinen)	0	0	1	0	1	1	1	0	4
Brazil (Gentile) 🔨	2	1	0	3	0	0	0	1	7

Sheet E	1	2	3	4	5	6	7	8	Final
Hungary (Orbán)	0	3	0	0	1	1	0	2	7
Spain (Torralba) 🔨	1	0	1	2	0	0	2	0	6

Sheet B	1	2	3	4	5	6	7	8	9	Final
Slovenia (Kavčič) 🔨	2	2	0	0	1	1	0	4	1	11
Croatia (Pavelka)	0	0	4	1	0	0	5	0	0	10

Sheet D	1	2	3	4	5	6	7	8	Final
Denmark (Schmidt) 🔨	1	0	1	0	2	0	0	X	4
Scotland (Soutar)	0	2	0	2	0	1	5	X	10

Sheet F	1	2	3	4	5	6	7	8	Final
Australia (Douglas)	4	0	2	0	0	0	0	0	6
England (Ward) 🔨	0	3	0	2	2	2	1	1	11

==== Draw 2 ====
Sunday, December 15, 12:00

Sheet A	1	2	3	4	5	6	7	8	Final
Austria (Müller)	0	0	0	1	0	1	0	X	2
Czech Republic (Farková) 🔨	2	2	1	0	2	0	3	X	10

Sheet E	1	2	3	4	5	6	7	8	Final
New Zealand (Russell)	0	0	0	0	1	0	X	X	1
South Korea (Kang) 🔨	2	2	4	1	0	3	X	X	12

Sheet B	1	2	3	4	5	6	7	8	Final
Latvia (Barone)	2	0	3	1	3	3	X	X	12
Poland (Herman) 🔨	0	1	0	0	0	0	X	X	1

==== Draw 3 ====
Sunday, December 15, 16:00

Sheet A	1	2	3	4	5	6	7	8	Final
Turkey (Yaşarbaş)	0	0	1	0	0	1	X	X	2
Scotland (Soutar) 🔨	2	3	0	3	1	0	X	X	9

Sheet C	1	2	3	4	5	6	7	8	Final
United States (Giroux)	1	0	1	0	1	0	0	X	3
China (Li) 🔨	0	3	0	2	0	3	1	X	9

Sheet E	1	2	3	4	5	6	7	8	Final
Brazil (Gentile) 🔨	2	2	1	1	1	3	X	X	10
Australia (Douglas)	0	0	0	0	0	0	X	X	0

Sheet B	1	2	3	4	5	6	7	8	Final
England (Ward)	0	0	1	2	1	0	1	2	7
Finland (Kiiskinen) 🔨	1	1	0	0	0	1	0	0	3

Sheet D	1	2	3	4	5	6	7	8	Final
Spain (Torralba) 🔨	1	2	1	0	3	2	3	X	12
Romania (Bacali)	0	0	0	2	0	0	0	X	2

Sheet F	1	2	3	4	5	6	7	8	Final
Slovenia (Kavčič) 🔨	0	1	0	1	0	1	3	X	6
Hungary (Orbán)	4	0	1	0	3	0	0	X	8

==== Draw 4 ====
Sunday, December 15, 20:00

Sheet C	1	2	3	4	5	6	7	8	Final
Poland (Herman)	0	2	0	2	0	0	1	0	5
New Zealand (Russell) 🔨	2	0	2	0	4	0	0	2	10

Sheet F	1	2	3	4	5	6	7	8	9	Final
South Korea (Kang)	0	2	0	0	3	0	2	0	0	7
Latvia (Barone) 🔨	1	0	3	1	0	1	0	1	2	9

Sheet D	1	2	3	4	5	6	7	8	Final
Lithuania (Kiudyte)	0	0	2	0	0	0	X	X	2
Czech Republic (Farková) 🔨	2	2	0	2	1	4	X	X	11

==== Draw 5 ====
Monday, December 16, 8:00

Sheet A	1	2	3	4	5	6	7	8	Final
Finland (Kiiskinen)	0	0	0	0	0	0	X	X	0
Denmark (Schmidt) 🔨	2	1	3	1	2	3	X	X	12

Sheet C	1	2	3	4	5	6	7	8	Final
Romania (Bacali) 🔨	0	0	0	0	0	1	X	X	1
Slovenia (Kavčič)	4	2	1	2	3	0	X	X	12

Sheet E	1	2	3	4	5	6	7	8	Final
Scotland (Soutar)	0	5	0	0	0	2	0	1	8
England (Ward) 🔨	1	0	1	1	1	0	1	0	5

Sheet B	1	2	3	4	5	6	7	8	Final
Australia (Douglas) 🔨	0	2	0	2	0	1	0	X	5
Turkey (Yaşarbaş)	1	0	3	0	3	0	3	X	10

Sheet D	1	2	3	4	5	6	7	8	Final
Croatia (Pavelka)	0	0	0	0	0	1	X	X	1
China (Li) 🔨	4	2	4	1	4	0	X	X	15

Sheet F	1	2	3	4	5	6	7	8	Final
Spain (Torralba)	0	0	0	0	2	0	X	X	2
United States (Giroux) 🔨	0	2	3	0	0	2	X	X	7

==== Draw 6 ====
Monday, December 16, 12:00

Sheet A	1	2	3	4	5	6	7	8	Final
Poland (Herman) 🔨	1	0	0	3	0	1	2	0	7
Lithuania (Kiudyte)	0	2	3	0	1	0	0	2	8

Sheet E	1	2	3	4	5	6	7	8	Final
Czech Republic (Farková)	0	1	0	2	0	2	0	X	5
Latvia (Barone) 🔨	1	0	2	0	2	0	4	X	9

Sheet B	1	2	3	4	5	6	7	8	Final
South Korea (Kang) 🔨	2	2	3	0	3	0	X	X	10
Austria (Müller)	0	0	0	1	0	1	X	X	2

==== Draw 7 ====
Monday, December 16, 16:00

Sheet A	1	2	3	4	5	6	7	8	Final
England (Ward)	1	1	1	0	0	2	1	0	6
Brazil (Gentile) 🔨	0	0	0	3	1	0	0	1	5

Sheet C	1	2	3	4	5	6	7	8	Final
Australia (Douglas)	0	0	2	0	0	0	X	X	2
Scotland (Soutar) 🔨	2	1	0	4	3	4	X	X	14

Sheet E	1	2	3	4	5	6	7	8	9	Final
Turkey (Yaşarbaş) 🔨	1	2	2	0	0	0	1	0	0	6
Denmark (Schmidt)	0	0	0	3	1	1	0	1	1	7

Sheet B	1	2	3	4	5	6	7	8	Final
China (Li) 🔨	0	2	0	3	1	0	4	X	10
Spain (Torralba)	1	0	0	0	0	2	0	X	3

Sheet D	1	2	3	4	5	6	7	8	Final
Hungary (Orbán) 🔨	1	0	1	0	0	0	1	X	3
United States (Giroux)	0	1	0	2	4	1	0	X	8

Sheet F	1	2	3	4	5	6	7	8	Final
Romania (Bacali)	1	0	0	3	1	1	0	X	6
Croatia (Pavelka) 🔨	0	1	1	0	0	0	1	X	3

==== Draw 8 ====
Monday, December 16, 20:00

Sheet C	1	2	3	4	5	6	7	8	9	Final
Austria (Müller)	0	1	0	1	1	0	1	1	0	5
Poland (Herman) 🔨	1	0	1	0	0	3	0	0	1	6

Sheet F	1	2	3	4	5	6	7	8	Final
Lithuania (Kiudyte)	0	0	0	0	1	0	X	X	1
South Korea (Kang) 🔨	1	1	2	4	0	2	X	X	10

Sheet D	1	2	3	4	5	6	7	8	Final
Czech Republic (Farková)	0	0	1	1	0	2	0	0	4
New Zealand (Russell) 🔨	1	0	0	0	1	0	1	0	3

==== Draw 9 ====
Tuesday, December 17, 8:00

Sheet B	1	2	3	4	5	6	7	8	Final
New Zealand (Russell) 🔨	1	3	0	0	1	0	0	X	5
Lithuania (Kiudyte)	0	0	1	1	0	3	3	X	8

Sheet F	1	2	3	4	5	6	7	8	Final
Czech Republic (Farková)	0	1	1	0	2	0	1	1	6
Poland (Herman) 🔨	1	0	0	1	0	1	0	0	3

Sheet D	1	2	3	4	5	6	7	8	Final
Latvia (Barone) 🔨	0	2	2	1	3	0	X	X	8
Austria (Müller)	1	0	0	0	0	1	X	X	2

==== Draw 10 ====
Tuesday, December 17, 12:00

Sheet A	1	2	3	4	5	6	7	8	Final
Slovenia (Kavčič)	0	0	1	0	2	0	0	X	3
Spain (Torralba) 🔨	3	1	0	1	0	1	4	X	10

Sheet C	1	2	3	4	5	6	7	8	Final
Croatia (Pavelka)	0	1	0	0	3	0	0	X	4
Hungary (Orbán) 🔨	1	0	1	3	0	4	1	X	10

Sheet E	1	2	3	4	5	6	7	8	Final
United States (Giroux) 🔨	2	3	3	1	4	0	X	X	13
Romania (Bacali)	0	0	0	0	0	1	X	X	1

Sheet B	1	2	3	4	5	6	7	8	Final
Brazil (Gentile)	0	1	0	1	0	1	0	X	3
Denmark (Schmidt) 🔨	2	0	3	0	1	0	1	X	7

Sheet D	1	2	3	4	5	6	7	8	Final
England (Ward) 🔨	0	0	0	2	0	0	X	X	2
Turkey (Yaşarbaş)	2	1	1	0	4	4	X	X	12

Sheet F	1	2	3	4	5	6	7	8	Final
Scotland (Soutar) 🔨	3	1	1	0	3	1	0	X	9
Finland (Kiiskinen)	0	0	0	2	0	0	2	X	4

==== Draw 11 ====
Tuesday, December 17, 16:00

Sheet A	1	2	3	4	5	6	7	8	Final
Latvia (Barone)	1	0	1	1	1	1	2	X	7
New Zealand (Russell) 🔨	0	1	0	0	0	0	0	X	1

Sheet E	1	2	3	4	5	6	7	8	Final
Austria (Müller)	0	0	1	1	0	1	0	X	3
Lithuania (Kiudyte) 🔨	2	1	0	0	3	0	2	X	8

Sheet C	1	2	3	4	5	6	7	8	Final
South Korea (Kang) 🔨	2	1	1	0	1	0	2	X	7
Czech Republic (Farková)	0	0	0	1	0	1	0	X	2

==== Draw 12 ====
Tuesday, December 17, 20:00

Sheet A	1	2	3	4	5	6	7	8	Final
Hungary (Orbán)	0	0	0	0	0	0	0	X	0
China (Li) 🔨	0	1	1	1	1	3	1	X	8

Sheet C	1	2	3	4	5	6	7	8	Final
Turkey (Yaşarbaş) 🔨	2	0	6	2	0	0	3	X	13
Finland (Kiiskinen)	0	1	0	0	2	2	0	X	5

Sheet E	1	2	3	4	5	6	7	8	Final
Spain (Torralba) 🔨	1	2	0	3	0	2	0	X	8
Croatia (Pavelka)	0	0	2	0	1	0	1	X	4

Sheet B	1	2	3	4	5	6	7	8	Final
United States (Giroux) 🔨	6	0	2	0	0	2	X	X	10
Slovenia (Kavčič)	0	1	0	1	0	0	X	X	2

Sheet D	1	2	3	4	5	6	7	8	Final
Scotland (Soutar)	0	0	2	2	0	0	2	X	6
Brazil (Gentile) 🔨	1	1	0	0	1	0	0	X	3

Sheet F	1	2	3	4	5	6	7	8	Final
Denmark (Schmidt) 🔨	1	0	1	0	2	1	2	X	7
Australia (Douglas)	0	1	0	1	0	0	0	X	2

==== Draw 13 ====
Wednesday, December 18, 8:00

Sheet C	1	2	3	4	5	6	7	8	Final
Lithuania (Kiudyte) 🔨	1	0	1	0	1	0	0	X	3
Latvia (Barone)	0	1	0	4	0	2	2	X	9

Sheet F	1	2	3	4	5	6	7	8	Final
New Zealand (Russell)	0	0	0	4	1	0	1	X	6
Austria (Müller) 🔨	3	3	2	0	0	2	0	X	10

Sheet D	1	2	3	4	5	6	7	8	Final
Poland (Herman)	0	0	1	0	1	0	X	X	2
South Korea (Kang) 🔨	2	3	0	2	0	2	X	X	9

==== Draw 14 ====
Wednesday, December 18, 12:00

Sheet A	1	2	3	4	5	6	7	8	Final
Croatia (Pavelka)	0	1	0	1	0	0	X	X	2
United States (Giroux) 🔨	3	0	5	0	3	2	X	X	13

Sheet C	1	2	3	4	5	6	7	8	Final
Denmark (Schmidt) 🔨	3	0	3	2	0	0	0	X	8
England (Ward)	0	2	0	0	1	1	0	X	4

Sheet E	1	2	3	4	5	6	7	8	Final
China (Li)	2	0	2	2	1	0	X	X	7
Slovenia (Kavčič) 🔨	0	1	0	0	0	1	X	X	2

Sheet B	1	2	3	4	5	6	7	8	Final
Romania (Bacali)	1	1	1	3	0	0	0	1	7
Hungary (Orbán) 🔨	0	0	0	0	1	1	1	0	3

Sheet D	1	2	3	4	5	6	7	8	Final
Finland (Kiiskinen)	0	5	5	0	0	1	4	X	15
Australia (Douglas) 🔨	3	0	0	1	1	0	0	X	5

Sheet F	1	2	3	4	5	6	7	8	Final
Brazil (Gentile)	0	0	1	0	0	1	0	X	2
Turkey (Yaşarbaş) 🔨	2	1	0	1	1	0	4	X	9

=== Playoffs ===
Quarterfinals
1	China	13
8	Turkey	0
4	South Korea	6
5	Denmark	4
3	Latvia	7
6	United States	3
2	Scotland	9
7	Hungary	2

Semifinals
1	China	6
4	South Korea	9
3	Latvia	9
2	Scotland	5

Gold medal game
4	South Korea	7
3	Latvia	3
Third place
1	China	8
2	Scotland	4

==== Quarterfinals ====
Wednesday, December 18, 19:00

Sheet A	1	2	3	4	5	6	7	8	Final
South Korea (Kang)	0	4	0	0	1	1	0	0	6
Denmark (Schmidt) 🔨	1	0	1	0	0	0	1	1	4

Sheet B	1	2	3	4	5	6	7	8	Final
China (Li) 🔨	1	1	2	3	3	3	X	X	13
Turkey (Yaşarbaş)	0	0	0	0	0	0	X	X	0

Sheet E	1	2	3	4	5	6	7	8	Final
Scotland (Soutar) 🔨	0	2	0	2	0	5	X	X	9
Hungary (Orbán)	0	0	1	0	1	0	X	X	2

Sheet F	1	2	3	4	5	6	7	8	Final
Latvia (Barone) 🔨	0	2	1	0	0	3	1	X	7
United States (Giroux)	0	0	0	2	1	0	0	X	3

==== Semifinals ====
Thursday, December 19, 10:00

Sheet B	1	2	3	4	5	6	7	8	Final
Latvia (Barone) 🔨	2	0	0	3	0	0	2	2	9
Scotland (Soutar)	0	2	1	0	1	1	0	0	5

Sheet E	1	2	3	4	5	6	7	8	Final
China (Li) 🔨	1	0	0	2	0	2	0	1	6
South Korea (Kang)	0	3	1	0	2	0	3	0	9

==== Bronze medal game ====
Thursday, December 19, 16:00

Sheet C	1	2	3	4	5	6	7	8	Final
China (Li)	0	1	0	2	0	3	0	2	8
Scotland (Soutar) 🔨	1	0	0	0	2	0	1	0	4

==== Gold medal game ====
Thursday, December 19, 16:00

Sheet D	1	2	3	4	5	6	7	8	Final
South Korea (Kang) 🔨	0	3	1	0	1	2	X	X	7
Latvia (Barone)	0	0	0	3	0	0	X	X	3

=== Final standings ===
Key
Teams Advance to the 2025 World Junior Curling Championships

Place	Team
1st place, gold medalist(s)	South Korea
2nd place, silver medalist(s)	Latvia
3rd place, bronze medalist(s)	China
4	Scotland
5	Denmark
5	Hungary
5	Turkey
5	United States
9	Czech Republic
10	Spain
11	England
12	Lithuania
13	Brazil
14	Slovenia
15	Poland
16	Austria
17	Finland
18	Romania
19	New Zealand
20	Australia
21	Croatia
