= 2022 World Junior-B Curling Championships =

2022 World Junior-B Curling Championships may refer to:

- 2022 World Junior-B Curling Championships (January), championship held to qualify teams for the 2022 World Junior Curling Championship
- 2022 World Junior-B Curling Championships (December), championship held to qualify teams for the 2023 World Junior Curling Championship
