= 2022 Baden Masters =

World Curling Tour event

- Host city: Baden, Switzerland
- Arena: Curling Club Baden Regio
- Dates: August 19–21
- Winner: (Norway) Team Walstad
- Curling club: Oppdal CK, Oppdal
- Skip: Steffen Walstad
- Third: Magnus Nedregotten
- Second: Mathias Brænden
- Lead: Magnus Vågberg
- Finalist: (Netherlands) Wouter Gösgens

The 2022 Baden Masters was held from August 19 to 21 at the Curling Club Baden Regio in Baden, Switzerland as part of the World Curling Tour. The event was held in a round-robin format with a purse of 35,000 CHF. It is the first men's event of the 2022–23 World Curling Tour. The event category for the event was 500.

== Teams ==
The teams are listed as follows:

Skip	Third	Second	Lead	Locale
Michael Brunner	Romano Meier	Anthony Petoud	Marcel Käufeler	Bern, Switzerland
James Craik	Mark Watt	Angus Bryce	Blair Haswell	Stirling, Scotland
Korey Dropkin	Andrew Stopera	Mark Fenner	Thomas Howell	(United States) Duluth, Minnesota
Niklas Edin	Oskar Eriksson	Rasmus Wranå	Christoffer Sundgren	Karlstad, Sweden
Colton Flasch	Catlin Schneider	Kevin Marsh	Dan Marsh	(Canada) Saskatoon, Saskatchewan
Wouter Gösgens	Jaap van Dorp	Laurens Hoekman	Tobias van den Hurk	Zoetermeer, Netherlands
Marco Hösli	Philipp Hösli	Marco Hefti	Justin Hausherr	Glarus, Switzerland
Grunde Buraas (Fourth)	Lukas Høstmælingen (Skip)	Magnus Lillebø	Tinius Haslev Nordbye	Oslo, Norway
Jan Iseli	Max Winz	Andreas Gerlach	Sandro Fanchini	Solothurn, Switzerland
Manuel Jermann	Yannick Jermann	Simon Hanhart	Wowa Sakaliuk	Arlesheim, Switzerland
Bruce Mouat	Grant Hardie	Bobby Lammie	Hammy McMillan Jr.	Stirling, Scotland
Magnus Ramsfjell	Martin Sesaker	Bendik Ramsfjell	Gaute Nepstad	Trondheim, Norway
Joël Retornaz	Amos Mosaner	Sebastiano Arman	Mattia Giovanella	Trentino, Italy
Andrin Schnider	Nicola Stoll	Noé Traub	Tom Winklehausen	Schaffhausen, Switzerland
Benoît Schwarz (Fourth)	Yannick Schwaller (Skip)	Sven Michel	Pablo Lachat	Geneva, Switzerland
Jan Hess (Fourth)	Yves Stocker (Skip)	Simon Gloor	Felix Eberhard	Zug, Switzerland
Sixten Totzek	Klaudius Harsch	Magnus Sutor	Dominik Greindl	Munich, Germany
Kyle Waddell	Craig Waddell	Mark Taylor	Gavin Barr	Glasgow, Scotland
Steffen Walstad	Magnus Nedregotten	Mathias Brænden	Magnus Vågberg	Oppdal, Norway
Ross Whyte	Robin Brydone	Duncan McFadzean	Euan Kyle	Stirling, Scotland

== Round-robin standings ==
Final round-robin standings

Key
Teams to Playoffs

Pool A	W	L	PF	PA	DSC
(Netherlands) Wouter Gösgens	3	1	23	21	17.53
(Switzerland) Yannick Schwaller	3	1	21	14	61.27
(Norway) Magnus Ramsfjell	2	2	19	23	20.27
(Scotland) Bruce Mouat	1	3	22	24	44.17
(Switzerland) Jan Iseli	1	3	19	22	50.77

Pool B	W	L	PF	PA	DSC
(Italy) Joël Retornaz	4	0	32	15	31.50
(Norway) Lukas Høstmælingen	3	1	29	26	41.87
(Switzerland) Yves Stocker	2	2	18	24	37.27
(Canada) Colton Flasch	1	3	19	24	122.00
(Scotland) Kyle Waddell	0	4	16	25	113.13

Pool C	W	L	PF	PA	DSC
(Switzerland) Marco Hösli	3	1	24	22	22.83
(United States) Korey Dropkin	3	1	24	15	31.37
(Scotland) James Craik	2	2	25	20	16.53
(Sweden) Niklas Edin	1	3	15	25	22.73
(Switzerland) Andrin Schnider	1	3	19	25	89.43

Pool D	W	L	PF	PA	DSC
(Scotland) Ross Whyte	4	0	32	11	44.93
(Norway) Steffen Walstad	3	1	24	19	16.37
(Switzerland) Michael Brunner	2	2	24	23	48.07
(Germany) Sixten Totzek	1	3	20	24	67.30
(Switzerland) Manuel Jermann	0	4	12	35	135.63

== Round-robin results ==
All draw times listed in Central European Time.

=== Draw 1 ===
Friday, August 19, 8:00 am

Sheet 1	1	2	3	4	5	6	7	8	Final
(Italy) Joël Retornaz	4	0	1	2	0	2	0	X	9
(Scotland) Kyle Waddell	0	2	0	0	2	0	1	X	5

Sheet 2	1	2	3	4	5	6	7	8	Final
(Netherlands) Wouter Gösgens	2	0	1	0	0	1	0	3	7
(Norway) Magnus Ramsfjell	0	2	0	3	0	0	1	0	6

Sheet 3	1	2	3	4	5	6	7	8	Final
(Norway) Lukas Høstmælingen	4	2	0	0	0	1	0	X	7
(Switzerland) Yves Stocker	0	0	2	0	1	0	2	X	5

Sheet 4	1	2	3	4	5	6	7	8	Final
(Switzerland) Jan Iseli	0	1	0	2	1	1	0	1	6
(Scotland) Bruce Mouat	1	0	1	0	0	0	2	0	4

=== Draw 2 ===
Friday, August 19, 10:30 am

Sheet 1	1	2	3	4	5	6	7	8	Final
(Scotland) Ross Whyte	3	2	0	2	1	3	X	X	11
(Switzerland) Manuel Jermann	0	0	1	0	0	0	X	X	1

Sheet 2	1	2	3	4	5	6	7	8	Final
(United States) Korey Dropkin	3	0	1	1	0	0	0	0	5
(Scotland) James Craik	0	2	0	0	2	1	1	1	7

Sheet 3	1	2	3	4	5	6	7	8	Final
(Norway) Steffen Walstad	0	2	0	1	3	0	1	X	7
(Germany) Sixten Totzek	2	0	0	0	0	1	0	X	3

Sheet 4	1	2	3	4	5	6	7	8	Final
(Sweden) Niklas Edin	0	1	0	1	0	1	0	0	3
(Switzerland) Andrin Schnider	2	0	2	0	1	0	1	2	8

=== Draw 3 ===
Friday, August 19, 1:00 pm

Sheet 1	1	2	3	4	5	6	7	8	Final
(Switzerland) Jan Iseli	0	1	0	0	1	1	0	X	3
(Netherlands) Wouter Gösgens	1	0	2	1	0	0	2	X	6

Sheet 2	1	2	3	4	5	6	7	8	Final
(Scotland) Bruce Mouat	0	3	0	1	0	1	1	X	6
(Switzerland) Yannick Schwaller	2	0	1	0	1	0	0	X	4

Sheet 3	1	2	3	4	5	6	7	8	Final
(Scotland) Kyle Waddell	0	1	0	0	1	0	1	X	3
(Canada) Colton Flasch	0	0	0	2	0	2	0	X	4

Sheet 4	1	2	3	4	5	6	7	8	Final
(Italy) Joël Retornaz	0	4	0	4	0	0	2	X	10
(Norway) Lukas Høstmælingen	3	0	2	0	0	1	0	X	6

=== Draw 4 ===
Friday, August 19, 4:00 pm

Sheet 1	1	2	3	4	5	6	7	8	Final
(Sweden) Niklas Edin	0	0	2	0	0	X	X	X	2
(United States) Korey Dropkin	1	2	0	2	3	X	X	X	8

Sheet 2	1	2	3	4	5	6	7	8	Final
(Switzerland) Andrin Schnider	2	0	1	0	3	0	X	X	6
(Switzerland) Marco Hösli	0	3	0	4	0	1	X	X	8

Sheet 3	1	2	3	4	5	6	7	8	Final
(Switzerland) Manuel Jermann	0	0	1	0	2	0	0	X	3
(Switzerland) Michael Brunner	2	1	0	2	0	2	3	X	10

Sheet 4	1	2	3	4	5	6	7	8	Final
(Scotland) Ross Whyte	0	2	0	2	0	2	2	X	8
(Norway) Steffen Walstad	2	0	1	0	1	0	0	X	4

=== Draw 5 ===
Friday, August 19, 6:30 pm

Sheet 1	1	2	3	4	5	6	7	8	Final
(Switzerland) Yves Stocker	0	1	0	1	1	2	0	1	6
(Canada) Colton Flasch	0	0	3	0	0	0	2	0	5

Sheet 2	1	2	3	4	5	6	7	8	Final
(Norway) Lukas Høstmælingen	0	0	3	0	1	1	0	1	6
(Scotland) Kyle Waddell	0	1	0	1	0	0	2	0	4

Sheet 3	1	2	3	4	5	6	7	8	9	Final
(Netherlands) Wouter Gösgens	1	0	2	0	2	0	2	0	1	8
(Scotland) Bruce Mouat	0	1	0	1	0	3	0	2	0	7

Sheet 4	1	2	3	4	5	6	7	8	Final
(Norway) Magnus Ramsfjell	1	0	0	0	X	X	X	X	1
(Switzerland) Yannick Schwaller	0	3	3	0	X	X	X	X	6

=== Draw 6 ===
Friday, August 19, 9:00 pm

Sheet 1	1	2	3	4	5	6	7	8	Final
(Germany) Sixten Totzek	2	0	1	0	1	0	1	0	5
(Switzerland) Michael Brunner	0	3	0	1	0	2	0	0	6

Sheet 2	1	2	3	4	5	6	7	8	Final
(Norway) Steffen Walstad	3	0	0	0	1	2	0	X	6
(Switzerland) Manuel Jermann	0	1	0	0	0	0	1	X	2

Sheet 3	1	2	3	4	5	6	7	8	Final
(United States) Korey Dropkin	2	0	1	0	1	1	0	X	5
(Switzerland) Andrin Schnider	0	1	0	1	0	0	1	X	3

Sheet 4	1	2	3	4	5	6	7	8	9	Final
(Scotland) James Craik	0	1	2	0	2	0	0	1	0	6
(Switzerland) Marco Hösli	2	0	0	1	0	2	1	0	1	7

=== Draw 7 ===
Saturday, August 20, 8:00 am

Sheet 1	1	2	3	4	5	6	7	8	Final
(Switzerland) Yannick Schwaller	2	0	0	2	0	0	1	X	5
(Netherlands) Wouter Gösgens	0	1	0	0	1	0	0	X	2

Sheet 2	1	2	3	4	5	6	7	8	9	Final
(Norway) Magnus Ramsfjell	2	0	0	0	1	0	0	2	1	6
(Switzerland) Jan Iseli	0	1	0	2	0	1	1	0	0	5

Sheet 3	1	2	3	4	5	6	7	8	Final
(Switzerland) Yves Stocker	0	0	1	0	0	X	X	X	1
(Italy) Joël Retornaz	3	1	0	0	4	X	X	X	8

Sheet 4	1	2	3	4	5	6	7	8	9	Final
(Canada) Colton Flasch	0	1	2	1	0	2	0	1	0	7
(Norway) Lukas Høstmælingen	1	0	0	0	3	0	3	0	3	10

=== Draw 8 ===
Saturday, August 20, 10:30 am

Sheet 1	1	2	3	4	5	6	7	8	Final
(Switzerland) Marco Hösli	1	0	0	0	1	1	0	X	3
(United States) Korey Dropkin	0	2	1	1	0	0	2	X	6

Sheet 2	1	2	3	4	5	6	7	8	Final
(Scotland) James Craik	0	1	0	0	2	0	0	X	3
(Sweden) Niklas Edin	1	0	0	2	0	2	1	X	6

Sheet 3	1	2	3	4	5	6	7	8	Final
(Germany) Sixten Totzek	1	1	0	0	2	0	0	X	4
(Scotland) Ross Whyte	0	0	0	2	0	3	0	X	5

Sheet 4	1	2	3	4	5	6	7	8	9	Final
(Switzerland) Michael Brunner	0	2	3	0	0	0	0	1	0	6
(Norway) Steffen Walstad	1	0	0	2	1	0	2	0	1	7

=== Draw 9 ===
Saturday, August 20, 1:45 pm

Sheet 1	1	2	3	4	5	6	7	8	Final
(Scotland) Bruce Mouat	0	2	0	2	0	0	1	0	5
(Norway) Magnus Ramsfjell	1	0	1	0	0	1	0	3	6

Sheet 2	1	2	3	4	5	6	7	8	Final
(Canada) Colton Flasch	0	0	3	0	0	0	0	0	3
(Italy) Joël Retornaz	0	0	0	2	0	1	1	1	5

Sheet 3	1	2	3	4	5	6	7	8	Final
(Switzerland) Yannick Schwaller	1	0	0	2	2	0	0	1	6
(Switzerland) Jan Iseli	0	1	1	0	0	1	2	0	5

Sheet 4	1	2	3	4	5	6	7	8	Final
(Scotland) Kyle Waddell	0	0	2	0	1	0	1	0	4
(Switzerland) Yves Stocker	1	0	0	2	0	1	0	2	6

=== Draw 10 ===
Saturday, August 20, 4:15 pm

Sheet 1	1	2	3	4	5	6	7	8	Final
(Switzerland) Andrin Schnider	0	0	2	0	X	X	X	X	2
(Scotland) James Craik	1	4	0	4	X	X	X	X	9

Sheet 2	1	2	3	4	5	6	7	8	Final
(Switzerland) Michael Brunner	0	1	0	1	0	X	X	X	2
(Scotland) Ross Whyte	2	0	2	0	4	X	X	X	8

Sheet 3	1	2	3	4	5	6	7	8	Final
(Switzerland) Marco Hösli	0	1	0	2	1	0	0	2	6
(Sweden) Niklas Edin	0	0	2	0	0	1	1	0	4

Sheet 4	1	2	3	4	5	6	7	8	Final
(Switzerland) Manuel Jermann	0	1	0	3	0	2	0	0	6
(Germany) Sixten Totzek	1	0	3	0	2	0	0	2	8

== Playoffs ==
Quarterfinals
1	(Italy) Joël Retornaz	2
8	(Switzerland) Yannick Schwaller	4
4	(Netherlands) Wouter Gösgens	7
5	(Switzerland) Marco Hösli	4
2	(Scotland) Ross Whyte	3
7	(Norway) Lukas Høstmælingen	4
3	(Norway) Steffen Walstad	6
6	(United States) Korey Dropkin	3

Semifinals
8	(Switzerland) Yannick Schwaller	6
4	(Netherlands) Wouter Gösgens	9
7	(Norway) Lukas Høstmælingen	1
3	(Norway) Steffen Walstad	9

Final
4	(Netherlands) Wouter Gösgens	3
3	(Norway) Steffen Walstad	5

=== Quarterfinals ===
Saturday, August 20, 8:30 pm

Sheet 1	1	2	3	4	5	6	7	8	Final
(Netherlands) Wouter Gösgens	0	0	1	3	1	1	0	1	7
(Switzerland) Marco Hösli	2	0	0	0	0	0	2	0	4

Sheet 2	1	2	3	4	5	6	7	8	Final
(Italy) Joël Retornaz	0	1	0	0	0	1	0	X	2
(Switzerland) Yannick Schwaller	1	0	1	0	1	0	1	X	4

Sheet 3	1	2	3	4	5	6	7	8	Final
(Norway) Steffen Walstad	0	1	1	2	0	2	X	X	6
(United States) Korey Dropkin	1	0	0	0	2	0	X	X	3

Sheet 4	1	2	3	4	5	6	7	8	9	Final
(Scotland) Ross Whyte	0	0	1	0	0	0	2	0	0	3
(Norway) Lukas Høstmælingen	0	1	0	1	0	0	0	1	1	4

=== Semifinals ===
Sunday, August 21, 9:00 am

Sheet 2	1	2	3	4	5	6	7	8	Final
(Norway) Lukas Høstmælingen	0	1	0	0	0	X	X	X	1
(Norway) Steffen Walstad	1	0	0	4	4	X	X	X	9

Sheet 3	1	2	3	4	5	6	7	8	Final
(Switzerland) Yannick Schwaller	0	0	2	0	3	0	1	0	6
(Netherlands) Wouter Gösgens	1	2	0	1	0	1	0	4	9

=== Final ===
Sunday, August 21, 1:30 pm

Sheet 2	1	2	3	4	5	6	7	8	Final
(Netherlands) Wouter Gösgens	0	0	0	1	0	0	2	0	3
(Norway) Steffen Walstad	0	1	2	0	0	1	0	1	5
