= 2022 World Junior Curling Championships =

- Host city: Jönköping, Sweden
- Arena: Jönköping Curling Club
- Dates: May 15–22
- Men's winner: Scotland
- Curling club: Edzell CC, Forfar
- Skip: James Craik
- Third: Angus Bryce
- Second: Scott Hyslop
- Lead: Niall Ryder
- Alternate: Jack Carrick
- Coach: Iain Watt
- Finalist: Germany (Kapp)
- Women's winner: Japan
- Curling club: Kazokoshi PA, Karuizawa
- Skip: Sae Yamamoto
- Fourth: Miyu Ueno
- Third: Eri Ogihara
- Second: Yui Ueno
- Alternate: Yuina Miura
- Coach: Ayumi Ogasawara
- Finalist: Sweden (Dryburgh)

The 2022 World Junior Curling Championships were held from May 15 to 22 at the Jönköping Curling Club in Jönköping, Sweden. The event was originally scheduled to be held March 5 to 12, however, was postponed due to the COVID-19 pandemic in Sweden. It was the final World Curling Federation event held during the 2021–22 curling season.

== Medallists ==
Junior	Gold	Silver	Bronze
Men	Scotland; James Craik; Angus Bryce; Scott Hyslop; Niall Ryder; Jack Carrick	Germany; Benjamin Kapp; Felix Messenzehl; Johannes Scheuerl; Magnus Sutor; Klaudius Harsch	Canada; Owen Purcell; Joel Krats; Adam McEachren; Scott Weagle; Scott Mitchell
Women	Japan; Miyu Ueno (Fourth); Eri Ogihara; Yui Ueno; Sae Yamamoto (Skip); Yuina Miura	Sweden; Moa Dryburgh; Thea Orefjord; Moa Tjärnlund; Moa Nilsson; Linda Stenlund	United States; Delaney Strouse; Anne O'Hara; Sydney Mullaney; Susan Dudt; Kaitlin Murphy

== Men ==
=== Qualification ===
The following nations qualified to participate in the 2022 World Junior Curling Championship:

Event	Vacancies	Qualified
Host Nation	1	Sweden
2020 World Junior Curling Championships	~~6~~ 5	Canada; Switzerland; Scotland; Germany; ~~Russia~~; United States
World Rankings	3	Italy; New Zealand; Norway
Wild Card	1	South Korea
TOTAL	10	

==== World Junior-B cancellation ====
The 2022 World Junior-B Curling Championships were intended to be held from January 3 to 14 to qualify the final three nations for the World Junior Curling Championships. However, on January 6, the World Curling Federation was forced to cancel the event due to an outbreak of COVID-19 cases. The three spots from the championship were then awarded to Italy, New Zealand and Norway, who were the highest ranked nations who had not already secured qualification spots.

==== Russian participation ====
As part of international sports' reaction to the Russian invasion of Ukraine, on February 28 the World Curling Federation initiated proceedings to remove the Russian Curling Federation from the 2022 Curling Championship, pending until March 3. In its statement the WCF said:

The World Curling Federation strongly condemns the military action undertaken by the Russian Government in their invasion of Ukraine and continues to hope for a swift and peaceful resolution to the situation.

On March 4, 2022, the WCF announced the removal of the RCF from the 2022 World Curling Championships. Their vacated spot was offered to South Korea, who accepted.

=== Teams ===
The teams are listed as follows:

Canada	Germany	Italy	New Zealand	Norway
Skip: Owen Purcell; Third: Joel Krats; Second: Adam McEachren; Lead: Scott Weagle; Alternate: Scott Mitchell	Skip: Benjamin Kapp; Third: Felix Messenzehl; Second: Johannes Scheuerl; Lead: Magnus Sutor; Alternate: Klaudius Harsch	Skip: Giacomo Colli; Third: Francesco De Zanna; Second: Simone Piffer; Lead: Daniele Casagrande; Alternate: Stefano Gilli	Skip: William Becker; Third: Sam Flanagan; Second: Darcy Nevill; Lead: Hunter Burke	Skip: Grunde Buraas; Third: Tinius Nordbye; Second: Magnus Lilleboe; Lead: Sander Moen; Alternate: Lukas Høstmælingen
Scotland	South Korea	Sweden	Switzerland	United States
Skip: James Craik; Third: Angus Bryce; Second: Scott Hyslop; Lead: Niall Ryder; Alternate: Jack Carrick	Skip: Lee Jae-beom; Third: Kim Eun-bin; Second: Kim Hyo-jun; Lead: Pyo Jeong-min; Alternate: Kim Jin-hun	Skip: Axel Landelius; Third: Alfons Johansson; Second: Olle Moberg; Lead: Jonas Bergens; Alternate: Alexander Palm	Fourth: Anthony Petoud; Skip: Kim Schwaller; Second: Andreas Gerlach; Lead: Jannis Bannwart; Alternate: Noé Traub	Skip: Daniel Casper; Third: Ethan Sampson; Second: Samuel Strouse; Lead: Coleman Thurston; Alternate: Marius Kleinas

=== Round-robin standings ===
Final round-robin standings

Key
Teams to Playoffs
Teams relegated to 2023 "B" Championship

Country	Skip	W	L	W–L	PF	PA	EW	EL	BE	SE	DSC
Scotland	James Craik	8	1	–	77	36	41	26	3	15	18.18
Germany	Benjamin Kapp	7	2	–	68	33	36	24	8	11	30.09
Canada	Owen Purcell	6	3	1–0	64	46	37	29	6	12	40.06
Norway	Grunde Buraas	6	3	0–1	69	56	34	33	5	6	32.98
Switzerland	Kim Schwaller	5	4	1–0	64	57	30	34	12	3	32.78
United States	Daniel Casper	5	4	0–1	63	65	37	35	5	8	26.28
South Korea	Lee Jae-beom	4	5	–	55	54	32	31	6	8	34.84
Italy	Giacomo Colli	3	6	–	47	64	29	37	7	5	35.13
Sweden	Axel Landelius	1	8	–	45	68	30	37	4	5	51.86
New Zealand	William Becker	0	9	–	28	101	20	40	5	2	99.56

Round Robin Summary Table
Pos.	Country	Canada	Germany	Italy	New Zealand	Norway	Scotland	South Korea	Sweden	Switzerland	United States	Record
3	Canada	—N/a	2–7	8–3	10–2	9–3	7–6	7–4	6–3	5–7	10–11	6–3
2	Germany	7–2	—	6–2	13–6	6–7	4–6	7–3	8–3	9–1	8–3	7–2
8	Italy	3–8	2–6	—	12–2	5–8	3–10	3–9	4–3	9–7	6–11	3–6
10	New Zealand	2–10	6–13	2–12	—	5–14	5–10	1–12	3–9	3–11	1–10	0–9
4	Norway	3–9	7–6	8–5	14–5	—	2–9	12–1	9–7	9–6	5–8	6–3
1	Scotland	6–7	6–4	10–3	10–5	9–2	—	8–5	11–4	8–5	9–1	8–1
7	South Korea	4–7	3–7	9–3	12–1	1–12	5–8	—	8–3	3–9	10–4	4–5
9	Sweden	3–6	3–8	3–4	9–3	7–9	4–11	3–8	—	5–10	8–9	1–8
5	Switzerland	7–5	1–9	7–9	11–3	6–9	5–8	9–3	10–5	—	8–6	5–4
6	United States	11–10	3–8	11–6	10–1	8–5	1–9	4–10	9–8	6–8	—	5–4

=== Round-robin results ===
All draw times are listed in Central European Summer Time (UTC+02:00).

==== Draw 1 ====
Sunday, May 15, 9:00

Sheet A	1	2	3	4	5	6	7	8	9	10	Final
Norway (Buraas) 🔨	0	2	1	0	5	2	0	0	4	X	14
New Zealand (Becker)	1	0	0	2	0	0	0	2	0	X	5

Sheet B	1	2	3	4	5	6	7	8	9	10	Final
Canada (Purcell)	0	3	2	0	0	0	2	0	3	0	10
United States (Casper) 🔨	2	0	0	0	3	1	0	3	0	2	11

Sheet C	1	2	3	4	5	6	7	8	9	10	Final
Germany (Kapp)	0	1	0	3	1	0	0	0	1	X	6
Italy (Colli) 🔨	1	0	0	0	0	1	0	0	0	X	2

Sheet D	1	2	3	4	5	6	7	8	9	10	Final
Scotland (Craik) 🔨	0	2	0	2	0	1	0	0	2	1	8
South Korea (Lee)	2	0	1	0	1	0	0	1	0	0	5

Sheet E	1	2	3	4	5	6	7	8	9	10	Final
Sweden (Landelius) 🔨	0	1	0	3	0	1	0	0	X	X	5
Switzerland (Schwaller)	1	0	3	0	2	0	0	4	X	X	10

==== Draw 2 ====
Sunday, May 15, 19:00

Sheet A	1	2	3	4	5	6	7	8	9	10	Final
United States (Casper) 🔨	0	0	0	0	0	0	1	0	X	X	1
Scotland (Craik)	0	1	1	1	2	1	0	3	X	X	9

Sheet B	1	2	3	4	5	6	7	8	9	10	Final
New Zealand (Becker)	0	0	0	1	0	0	X	X	X	X	1
South Korea (Lee) 🔨	2	1	0	0	6	3	X	X	X	X	12

Sheet C	1	2	3	4	5	6	7	8	9	10	Final
Sweden (Landelius) 🔨	0	3	0	1	0	2	0	0	1	0	7
Norway (Buraas)	2	0	1	0	1	0	1	0	0	4	9

Sheet D	1	2	3	4	5	6	7	8	9	10	Final
Switzerland (Schwaller)	0	2	0	0	3	0	2	0	0	X	7
Italy (Colli) 🔨	1	0	2	1	0	3	0	1	1	X	9

Sheet E	1	2	3	4	5	6	7	8	9	10	Final
Canada (Purcell)	0	1	0	0	0	0	1	X	X	X	2
Germany (Kapp) 🔨	1	0	0	2	1	3	0	X	X	X	7

==== Draw 3 ====
Monday, May 16, 14:00

Sheet A	1	2	3	4	5	6	7	8	9	10	Final
Italy (Colli) 🔨	1	0	0	0	0	0	2	0	X	X	3
Canada (Purcell)	0	0	1	3	1	1	0	2	X	X	8

Sheet B	1	2	3	4	5	6	7	8	9	10	Final
Norway (Buraas)	0	4	1	0	0	2	0	2	0	X	9
Switzerland (Schwaller) 🔨	1	0	0	0	2	0	2	0	1	X	6

Sheet C	1	2	3	4	5	6	7	8	9	10	Final
New Zealand (Becker)	0	0	0	1	0	3	0	1	0	X	5
Scotland (Craik) 🔨	2	0	1	0	1	0	3	0	3	X	10

Sheet D	1	2	3	4	5	6	7	8	9	10	Final
Germany (Kapp) 🔨	2	0	0	2	0	0	3	1	X	X	8
Sweden (Landelius)	0	1	1	0	0	1	0	0	X	X	3

Sheet E	1	2	3	4	5	6	7	8	9	10	Final
United States (Casper)	0	1	0	1	1	0	1	0	X	X	4
South Korea (Lee) 🔨	2	0	2	0	0	4	0	2	X	X	10

==== Draw 4 ====
Tuesday, May 17, 9:00

Sheet A	1	2	3	4	5	6	7	8	9	10	Final
South Korea (Lee) 🔨	1	0	0	2	1	4	0	X	X	X	8
Sweden (Landelius)	0	1	1	0	0	0	1	X	X	X	3

Sheet B	1	2	3	4	5	6	7	8	9	10	Final
Germany (Kapp)	1	0	2	0	0	1	0	0	0	X	4
Scotland (Craik) 🔨	0	2	0	1	1	0	0	0	2	X	6

Sheet C	1	2	3	4	5	6	7	8	9	10	Final
Switzerland (Schwaller) 🔨	0	0	2	0	4	0	1	0	1	0	8
United States (Casper)	0	0	0	2	0	2	0	1	0	1	6

Sheet D	1	2	3	4	5	6	7	8	9	10	Final
Italy (Colli) 🔨	1	0	1	0	0	2	0	1	0	0	5
Norway (Buraas)	0	2	0	2	0	0	2	0	0	2	8

Sheet E	1	2	3	4	5	6	7	8	9	10	Final
New Zealand (Becker)	0	1	0	0	1	0	0	0	0	X	2
Canada (Purcell) 🔨	2	0	1	0	0	2	1	1	3	X	10

==== Draw 5 ====
Tuesday, May 17, 19:00

Sheet A	1	2	3	4	5	6	7	8	9	10	Final
Germany (Kapp) 🔨	0	3	0	2	0	1	0	2	X	X	8
United States (Casper)	0	0	1	0	0	0	2	0	X	X	3

Sheet B	1	2	3	4	5	6	7	8	9	10	Final
Sweden (Landelius) 🔨	4	1	0	0	4	0	X	X	X	X	9
New Zealand (Becker)	0	0	1	1	0	1	X	X	X	X	3

Sheet C	1	2	3	4	5	6	7	8	9	10	Final
Norway (Buraas) 🔨	1	0	0	4	1	6	X	X	X	X	12
South Korea (Lee)	0	0	1	0	0	0	X	X	X	X	1

Sheet D	1	2	3	4	5	6	7	8	9	10	Final
Canada (Purcell) 🔨	0	0	1	0	1	0	2	0	1	0	5
Switzerland (Schwaller)	0	0	0	4	0	2	0	0	0	1	7

Sheet E	1	2	3	4	5	6	7	8	9	10	Final
Scotland (Craik)	0	2	0	2	0	2	4	X	X	X	10
Italy (Colli) 🔨	2	0	1	0	0	0	0	X	X	X	3

==== Draw 6 ====
Wednesday, May 18, 14:00

Sheet A	1	2	3	4	5	6	7	8	9	10	Final
Sweden (Landelius) 🔨	0	0	1	1	0	0	0	0	1	0	3
Italy (Colli)	1	1	0	0	0	0	0	1	0	1	4

Sheet B	1	2	3	4	5	6	7	8	9	10	Final
United States (Casper)	1	0	2	0	1	0	2	0	2	X	8
Norway (Buraas) 🔨	0	2	0	1	0	1	0	1	0	X	5

Sheet C	1	2	3	4	5	6	7	8	9	10	11	Final
Scotland (Craik) 🔨	1	0	0	2	0	0	0	2	1	0	0	6
Canada (Purcell)	0	0	2	0	0	3	0	0	0	1	1	7

Sheet D	1	2	3	4	5	6	7	8	9	10	Final
South Korea (Lee) 🔨	0	0	1	0	1	0	1	0	0	0	3
Germany (Kapp)	0	0	0	2	0	2	0	0	1	2	7

Sheet E	1	2	3	4	5	6	7	8	9	10	Final
Switzerland (Schwaller) 🔨	0	3	3	0	0	2	0	0	3	X	11
New Zealand (Becker)	0	0	0	2	0	0	0	1	0	X	3

==== Draw 7 ====
Thursday, May 19, 9:00

Sheet A	1	2	3	4	5	6	7	8	9	10	Final
Canada (Purcell) 🔨	1	0	0	2	0	2	0	2	0	X	7
South Korea (Lee)	0	1	0	0	1	0	1	0	1	X	4

Sheet B	1	2	3	4	5	6	7	8	9	10	Final
Switzerland (Schwaller)	0	0	0	0	1	0	0	0	X	X	1
Germany (Kapp) 🔨	0	3	0	1	0	2	0	3	X	X	9

Sheet C	1	2	3	4	5	6	7	8	9	10	Final
Italy (Colli)	0	4	3	0	0	5	X	X	X	X	12
New Zealand (Becker) 🔨	1	0	0	1	0	0	X	X	X	X	2

Sheet D	1	2	3	4	5	6	7	8	9	10	Final
Sweden (Landelius)	0	3	0	0	2	0	2	0	1	0	8
United States (Casper) 🔨	1	0	0	3	0	2	0	2	0	1	9

Sheet E	1	2	3	4	5	6	7	8	9	10	Final
Norway (Buraas) 🔨	1	0	1	0	0	0	X	X	X	X	2
Scotland (Craik)	0	3	0	3	2	1	X	X	X	X	9

==== Draw 8 ====
Thursday, May 19, 19:00

Sheet A	1	2	3	4	5	6	7	8	9	10	Final
New Zealand (Becker)	0	0	1	0	1	0	4	0	0	X	6
Germany (Kapp) 🔨	0	2	0	2	0	2	0	4	3	X	13

Sheet B	1	2	3	4	5	6	7	8	9	10	Final
Scotland (Craik)	0	2	0	2	0	3	0	4	X	X	11
Sweden (Landelius) 🔨	1	0	1	0	1	0	1	0	X	X	4

Sheet C	1	2	3	4	5	6	7	8	9	10	Final
South Korea (Lee)	0	0	0	2	0	0	1	0	X	X	3
Switzerland (Schwaller) 🔨	0	2	1	0	1	0	0	5	X	X	9

Sheet D	1	2	3	4	5	6	7	8	9	10	Final
Norway (Buraas)	0	0	0	0	1	0	2	0	X	X	3
Canada (Purcell) 🔨	1	0	1	0	0	2	0	5	X	X	9

Sheet E	1	2	3	4	5	6	7	8	9	10	Final
Italy (Colli)	0	2	0	1	0	0	2	0	1	0	6
United States (Casper) 🔨	1	0	2	0	2	1	0	2	0	3	11

==== Draw 9 ====
Friday, May 20, 14:00

Sheet A	1	2	3	4	5	6	7	8	9	10	Final
Scotland (Craik)	0	0	2	0	2	0	0	2	1	1	8
Switzerland (Schwaller) 🔨	0	1	0	2	0	0	2	0	0	0	5

Sheet B	1	2	3	4	5	6	7	8	9	10	Final
South Korea (Lee) 🔨	0	1	0	3	0	1	1	1	2	X	9
Italy (Colli)	0	0	2	0	1	0	0	0	0	X	3

Sheet C	1	2	3	4	5	6	7	8	9	10	Final
Canada (Purcell)	0	0	0	0	2	1	0	2	1	X	6
Sweden (Landelius) 🔨	0	0	1	1	0	0	1	0	0	X	3

Sheet D	1	2	3	4	5	6	7	8	9	10	Final
United States (Casper) 🔨	0	1	1	1	2	5	0	X	X	X	10
New Zealand (Becker)	0	0	0	0	0	0	1	X	X	X	1

Sheet E	1	2	3	4	5	6	7	8	9	10	11	Final
Germany (Kapp) 🔨	0	1	0	1	0	2	0	0	0	2	0	6
Norway (Buraas)	0	0	2	0	2	0	0	0	2	0	1	7

=== Playoffs ===
Semifinal
1	Scotland	7
4	Norway	5
2	Germany	8
3	Canada	5

Final
1	Scotland	7
2	Germany	1

Bronze medal game
4	Norway	4
3	Canada	13

==== Semifinals ====
Saturday, May 21, 14:00

Sheet B	1	2	3	4	5	6	7	8	9	10	Final
Germany (Kapp) 🔨	0	2	0	2	0	1	0	2	0	1	8
Canada (Purcell)	0	0	0	0	2	0	2	0	1	0	5

Player percentages
Germany		Canada	
Magnus Sutor	85%	Scott Weagle	99%
Johannes Scheuerl	90%	Adam McEachren	65%
Felix Messenzehl	86%	Joel Krats	86%
Benjamin Kapp	84%	Owen Purcell	70%
Total	86%	Total	80%

Sheet D	1	2	3	4	5	6	7	8	9	10	Final
Scotland (Craik) 🔨	2	0	0	2	1	1	0	1	0	X	7
Norway (Buraas)	0	0	1	0	0	0	2	0	2	X	5

Player percentages
Scotland		Norway	
Niall Ryder	69%	Sander Moen	80%
Scott Hyslop	79%	Magnus Lilleboe	64%
Angus Bryce	83%	Tinius Nordbye	69%
James Craik	82%	Grunde Buraas	68%
Total	78%	Total	70%

==== Bronze medal game ====
Sunday, May 22, 9:00

Sheet A	1	2	3	4	5	6	7	8	9	10	Final
Norway (Buraas)	0	2	0	0	1	0	1	0	X	X	4
Canada (Purcell) 🔨	1	0	4	2	0	4	0	2	X	X	13

Player percentages
Norway		Canada	
Sander Moen	81%	Scott Weagle	88%
Magnus Lilleboe	77%	Adam McEachren	84%
Tinius Nordbye	68%	Joel Krats	80%
Grunde Buraas Lukas Høstmælingen	69% 75%	Owen Purcell	83%
Total	74%	Total	84%

==== Final ====
Sunday, May 22, 9:00

Sheet C	1	2	3	4	5	6	7	8	9	10	Final
Scotland (Craik) 🔨	1	0	2	0	0	2	1	1	X	X	7
Germany (Kapp)	0	0	0	1	0	0	0	0	X	X	1

Player percentages
Scotland		Germany	
Niall Ryder	86%	Magnus Sutor	94%
Scott Hyslop	88%	Johannes Scheuerl	83%
Angus Bryce	84%	Felix Messenzehl	75%
James Craik	83%	Benjamin Kapp	72%
Total	85%	Total	81%

=== Final standings ===
Key
Teams relegated to 2023 World Junior-B Curling Championships

Place	Team
1st place, gold medalist(s)	Scotland
2nd place, silver medalist(s)	Germany
3rd place, bronze medalist(s)	Canada
4	Norway
5	Switzerland
6	United States
7	South Korea
8	Italy
9	Sweden
10	New Zealand

== Women ==
=== Qualification ===
The following nations qualified to participate in the 2022 World Junior Curling Championship:

Event	Vacancies	Qualified
Host Nation	1	Sweden
2020 World Junior Curling Championships	~~6~~ 5	Canada; South Korea; ~~Russia~~; Japan; Switzerland; Denmark
World Rankings	3	Latvia; Norway; United States
Emergency Ruling Replacement	1	Scotland
TOTAL	10	

==== World Junior-B cancellation ====
The 2022 World Junior-B Curling Championships were intended to be held from January 3 to 14 to qualify the final three nations for the World Junior Curling Championships. However, on January 6, the World Curling Federation was forced to cancel the event due to an outbreak of COVID-19 cases. The three spots from the championship were then awarded to Latvia, Norway and United States, who were the highest ranked nations who had not already secured qualification spots.

==== Russian participation ====
As part of international sports' reaction to the Russian invasion of Ukraine, on February 28 the World Curling Federation initiated proceedings to remove the Russian Curling Federation from the 2022 Curling Championship, pending until March 3. In its statement the WCF said:

The World Curling Federation strongly condemns the military action undertaken by the Russian Government in their invasion of Ukraine and continues to hope for a swift and peaceful resolution to the situation.

On March 4, 2022, the WCF announced the removal of the RCF from the 2022 World Curling Championships. Their vacated spot was originally offered to Hungary, who declined as they were unable to send a team in time. Their spot was then offered to Scotland, who accepted.

=== Teams ===
The teams are listed as follows:

Canada	Denmark	Japan	Latvia	Norway
Skip: Isabelle Ladouceur; Third: Jamie Smith; Second: Lauren Rajala; Lead: Katie Shaw; Alternate: Katy Lukowich	Skip: Karolina Jensen; Third: Gabriella Qvist; Second: Natalie Wiksten; Lead: Maja Bidstrup Nyboe; Alternate: Signe Schack	Fourth: Miyu Ueno; Third: Eri Ogihara; Second: Yui Ueno; Skip: Sae Yamamoto; Alternate: Yuina Miura	Skip: Evelīna Barone; Third: Rēzija Ieviņa; Second: Veronika Apse; Lead: Ērika Patrīcija Bitmete; Alternate: Letīcija Ieviņa	Skip: Eirin Mesloe; Third: Torild Bjørnstad; Second: Nora Østgård; Lead: Ingeborg Forbregd; Alternate: Nina Aune
Scotland	South Korea	Sweden	Switzerland	United States
Skip: Fay Henderson; Third: Katie McMillan; Second: Lisa Davie; Lead: Holly Wilkie-Milne; Alternate: Robyn Mitchell	Skip: Kang Bo-bae; Third: Park Han-byul; Second: Choi Ye-jin; Lead: Lee You-sun; Alternate: Jo Ju-hee	Skip: Moa Dryburgh; Third: Thea Orefjord; Second: Moa Tjärnlund; Lead: Moa Nilsson; Alternate: Linda Stenlund	Skip: Xenia Schwaller; Third: Malin Da Ros; Second: Marion Wüest; Lead: Selina Gafner; Alternate: Sarah Müller	Skip: Delaney Strouse; Third: Anne O'Hara; Second: Sydney Mullaney; Lead: Susan Dudt; Alternate: Kaitlin Murphy

=== Round-robin standings ===
Final round-robin standings

Key
Teams to Playoffs
Teams relegated to 2023 "B" Championship

Country	Skip	W	L	W–L	PF	PA	EW	EL	BE	SE	DSC
Norway	Eirin Mesloe	7	2	1–0	72	60	41	36	2	12	51.84
United States	Delaney Strouse	7	2	0–1	74	55	44	28	7	19	39.74
Japan	Sae Yamamoto	6	3	–	62	50	37	33	11	8	53.90
Sweden	Moa Dryburgh	5	4	1–1	59	53	32	36	6	8	40.56
Switzerland	Xenia Schwaller	5	4	1–1	55	47	37	30	12	9	47.42
Latvia	Evelīna Barone	5	4	1–1	69	59	36	36	5	10	80.39
Scotland	Fay Henderson	3	6	1–1	58	69	34	40	5	6	51.28
South Korea	Kang Bo-bae	3	6	1–1	58	68	37	34	5	11	52.92
Canada	Isabelle Ladouceur	3	6	1–1	67	74	37	42	1	10	54.88
Denmark	Karolina Jensen	1	8	–	38	77	23	43	5	3	49.26

Round Robin Summary Table
Pos.	Country	Canada	Denmark	Japan	Latvia	Norway	Scotland	South Korea	Sweden	Switzerland	United States	Record
9	Canada	—	11–7	5–6	8–12	5–11	7–9	10–3	8–9	8–6	5–11	3–6
10	Denmark	7–11	—	4–6	7–9	6–9	4–8	2–9	2–7	6–5	0–13	1–8
3	Japan	6–5	6–4	—	3–10	10–5	7–4	9–6	8–1	5–6	8–9	6–3
6	Latvia	12–8	9–7	10–3	—	8–9	5–7	2–8	9–5	4–6	10–6	5–4
1	Norway	11–5	9–6	5–10	9–8	—	9–7	9–7	7–5	6–9	7–3	7–2
7	Scotland	9–7	8–4	4–7	7–5	7–9	—	8–9	4–11	3–8	8–9	3–6
8	South Korea	3–10	9–2	6–9	8–2	7–9	9–8	—	5–10	2–8	9–10	3–6
4	Sweden	9–8	7–2	1–8	5–9	5–7	11–4	10–5	—	7–3	4–7	5–4
5	Switzerland	6–8	5–6	6–5	6–4	9–6	8–3	8–2	3–7	—	4–6	5–4
2	United States	11–5	13–0	9–8	6–10	3–7	9–8	10–9	7–4	6–4	—	7–2

=== Round-robin results ===
All draw times are listed in Central European Summer Time (UTC+02:00).

==== Draw 1 ====
Sunday, May 15, 14:00

Sheet A	1	2	3	4	5	6	7	8	9	10	Final
Japan (Yamamoto) 🔨	0	3	1	0	2	0	2	0	0	1	9
South Korea (Kang)	0	0	0	2	0	2	0	1	1	0	6

Sheet B	1	2	3	4	5	6	7	8	9	10	Final
Switzerland (Schwaller)	0	0	0	0	0	1	0	1	1	X	3
Sweden (Dryburgh) 🔨	1	0	0	2	0	0	4	0	0	X	7

Sheet C	1	2	3	4	5	6	7	8	9	10	Final
Canada (Ladouceur) 🔨	2	3	0	0	0	1	0	1	0	0	7
Scotland (Henderson)	0	0	3	2	1	0	2	0	0	1	9

Sheet D	1	2	3	4	5	6	7	8	9	10	Final
Norway (Mesloe)	0	2	1	0	2	0	2	1	0	1	9
Denmark (Jensen) 🔨	0	0	0	2	0	3	0	0	1	0	6

Sheet E	1	2	3	4	5	6	7	8	9	10	Final
Latvia (Barone)	0	2	0	2	0	2	0	0	4	X	10
United States (Strouse) 🔨	1	0	2	0	1	0	1	1	0	X	6

==== Draw 2 ====
Monday, May 16, 9:00

Sheet A	1	2	3	4	5	6	7	8	9	10	Final
Sweden (Dryburgh)	0	0	0	0	1	2	0	2	0	0	5
Norway (Mesloe) 🔨	0	1	0	3	0	0	2	0	0	1	7

Sheet B	1	2	3	4	5	6	7	8	9	10	Final
South Korea (Kang) 🔨	0	2	1	3	0	1	2	X	X	X	9
Denmark (Jensen)	0	0	0	0	2	0	0	X	X	X	2

Sheet C	1	2	3	4	5	6	7	8	9	10	Final
Latvia (Barone) 🔨	2	0	0	4	1	3	0	X	X	X	10
Japan (Yamamoto)	0	0	2	0	0	0	1	X	X	X	3

Sheet D	1	2	3	4	5	6	7	8	9	10	Final
United States (Strouse)	0	0	0	1	0	4	0	1	0	3	9
Scotland (Henderson) 🔨	0	3	0	0	1	0	1	0	3	0	8

Sheet E	1	2	3	4	5	6	7	8	9	10	Final
Switzerland (Schwaller) 🔨	1	0	1	1	0	2	0	1	0	0	6
Canada (Ladouceur)	0	3	0	0	2	0	2	0	0	1	8

==== Draw 3 ====
Monday, May 16, 19:00

Sheet A	1	2	3	4	5	6	7	8	9	10	Final
Scotland (Henderson)	0	0	1	0	0	2	0	0	0	X	3
Switzerland (Schwaller) 🔨	0	2	0	2	1	0	0	2	1	X	8

Sheet B	1	2	3	4	5	6	7	8	9	10	11	Final
Japan (Yamamoto)	0	0	3	0	2	0	0	1	0	2	0	8
United States (Strouse) 🔨	1	0	0	3	0	1	2	0	1	0	1	9

Sheet C	1	2	3	4	5	6	7	8	9	10	Final
South Korea (Kang)	0	0	1	0	1	2	0	1	0	2	7
Norway (Mesloe) 🔨	1	1	0	2	0	0	3	0	2	0	9

Sheet D	1	2	3	4	5	6	7	8	9	10	Final
Canada (Ladouceur)	0	0	0	2	3	0	1	2	0	X	8
Latvia (Barone) 🔨	0	4	3	0	0	3	0	0	2	X	12

Sheet E	1	2	3	4	5	6	7	8	9	10	Final
Sweden (Dryburgh)	1	0	0	2	0	4	0	X	X	X	7
Denmark (Jensen) 🔨	0	1	0	0	0	0	1	X	X	X	2

==== Draw 4 ====
Tuesday, May 17, 14:00

Sheet A	1	2	3	4	5	6	7	8	9	10	Final
Denmark (Jensen) 🔨	0	0	3	0	0	1	0	0	3	0	7
Latvia (Barone)	1	1	0	0	2	0	0	1	0	4	9

Sheet B	1	2	3	4	5	6	7	8	9	10	Final
Canada (Ladouceur) 🔨	0	1	0	0	1	0	0	3	0	X	5
Norway (Mesloe)	1	0	1	1	0	3	1	0	4	X	11

Sheet C	1	2	3	4	5	6	7	8	9	10	Final
United States (Strouse)	0	1	0	1	0	1	1	1	0	2	7
Sweden (Dryburgh) 🔨	1	0	1	0	2	0	0	0	0	0	4

Sheet D	1	2	3	4	5	6	7	8	9	10	Final
Scotland (Henderson)	0	0	0	0	1	0	2	0	1	X	4
Japan (Yamamoto) 🔨	0	1	1	2	0	1	0	2	0	X	7

Sheet E	1	2	3	4	5	6	7	8	9	10	Final
South Korea (Kang)	0	0	1	0	1	0	0	X	X	X	2
Switzerland (Schwaller) 🔨	0	2	0	3	0	2	1	X	X	X	8

==== Draw 5 ====
Wednesday, May 18, 9:00

Sheet A	1	2	3	4	5	6	7	8	9	10	Final
Canada (Ladouceur)	0	0	1	0	3	0	0	2	2	0	8
Sweden (Dryburgh) 🔨	0	1	0	2	0	3	2	0	0	1	9

Sheet B	1	2	3	4	5	6	7	8	9	10	Final
Latvia (Barone)	0	0	0	0	0	2	0	0	0	X	2
South Korea (Kang) 🔨	0	0	3	0	1	0	1	1	2	X	8

Sheet C	1	2	3	4	5	6	7	8	9	10	Final
Japan (Yamamoto) 🔨	2	0	0	1	0	1	0	1	1	X	6
Denmark (Jensen)	0	0	1	0	2	0	1	0	0	X	4

Sheet D	1	2	3	4	5	6	7	8	9	10	Final
Switzerland (Schwaller)	0	0	2	0	0	0	1	1	0	X	4
United States (Strouse) 🔨	0	2	0	1	0	1	0	0	2	X	6

Sheet E	1	2	3	4	5	6	7	8	9	10	Final
Norway (Mesloe) 🔨	3	0	2	0	1	0	2	0	1	X	9
Scotland (Henderson)	0	2	0	2	0	2	0	1	0	X	7

==== Draw 6 ====
Wednesday, May 18, 19:00

Sheet A	1	2	3	4	5	6	7	8	9	10	Final
Latvia (Barone)	0	0	0	1	0	2	0	0	2	0	5
Scotland (Henderson) 🔨	0	0	3	0	1	0	0	2	0	1	7

Sheet B	1	2	3	4	5	6	7	8	9	10	Final
Sweden (Dryburgh)	0	0	1	0	0	0	0	X	X	X	1
Japan (Yamamoto) 🔨	0	2	0	2	2	1	1	X	X	X	8

Sheet C	1	2	3	4	5	6	7	8	9	10	Final
Norway (Mesloe)	0	1	0	0	2	0	0	2	1	0	6
Switzerland (Schwaller) 🔨	1	0	1	1	0	1	1	0	0	4	9

Sheet D	1	2	3	4	5	6	7	8	9	10	Final
Denmark (Jensen)	0	1	0	1	0	3	0	2	0	X	7
Canada (Ladouceur) 🔨	3	0	2	0	2	0	2	0	2	X	11

Sheet E	1	2	3	4	5	6	7	8	9	10	Final
United States (Strouse) 🔨	0	3	1	0	0	0	4	0	2	0	10
South Korea (Kang)	0	0	0	1	0	1	0	5	0	2	9

==== Draw 7 ====
Thursday, May 19, 14:00

Sheet A	1	2	3	4	5	6	7	8	9	10	Final
Switzerland (Schwaller)	0	0	0	0	0	1	0	3	0	1	5
Denmark (Jensen) 🔨	0	1	0	1	0	0	2	0	2	0	6

Sheet B	1	2	3	4	5	6	7	8	9	10	Final
United States (Strouse)	1	0	2	1	1	2	0	0	4	X	11
Canada (Ladouceur) 🔨	0	2	0	0	0	0	1	2	0	X	5

Sheet C	1	2	3	4	5	6	7	8	9	10	11	Final
Scotland (Henderson)	0	0	2	0	1	1	0	3	0	1	0	8
South Korea (Kang) 🔨	0	2	0	1	0	0	3	0	2	0	1	9

Sheet D	1	2	3	4	5	6	7	8	9	10	Final
Latvia (Barone)	0	3	0	1	0	1	0	1	2	1	9
Sweden (Dryburgh) 🔨	1	0	2	0	1	0	1	0	0	0	5

Sheet E	1	2	3	4	5	6	7	8	9	10	Final
Japan (Yamamoto) 🔨	2	0	0	2	0	2	0	4	X	X	10
Norway (Mesloe)	0	1	0	0	1	0	3	0	X	X	5

==== Draw 8 ====
Friday, May 20, 9:00

Sheet A	1	2	3	4	5	6	7	8	9	10	Final
South Korea (Kang)	0	0	0	1	0	0	1	1	0	X	3
Canada (Ladouceur) 🔨	1	0	1	0	4	1	0	0	3	X	10

Sheet B	1	2	3	4	5	6	7	8	9	10	11	Final
Norway (Mesloe) 🔨	0	2	0	0	1	2	0	0	3	0	1	9
Latvia (Barone)	1	0	0	2	0	0	2	1	0	2	0	8

Sheet C	1	2	3	4	5	6	7	8	9	10	Final
Denmark (Jensen) 🔨	0	0	0	0	0	0	X	X	X	X	0
United States (Strouse)	3	1	2	2	3	2	X	X	X	X	13

Sheet D	1	2	3	4	5	6	7	8	9	10	11	Final
Japan (Yamamoto) 🔨	0	0	1	0	2	0	0	2	0	0	0	5
Switzerland (Schwaller)	0	0	0	2	0	1	0	0	0	2	1	6

Sheet E	1	2	3	4	5	6	7	8	9	10	Final
Scotland (Henderson)	0	0	0	2	0	0	2	0	0	X	4
Sweden (Dryburgh) 🔨	2	2	2	0	0	1	0	2	2	X	11

==== Draw 9 ====
Friday, May 20, 19:00

Sheet A	1	2	3	4	5	6	7	8	9	10	Final
Norway (Mesloe)	0	0	0	3	1	0	0	0	3	X	7
United States (Strouse) 🔨	0	0	0	0	0	1	1	1	0	X	3

Sheet B	1	2	3	4	5	6	7	8	9	10	Final
Denmark (Jensen)	1	1	0	0	0	0	2	0	0	X	4
Scotland (Henderson) 🔨	0	0	1	1	0	1	0	2	3	X	8

Sheet C	1	2	3	4	5	6	7	8	9	10	Final
Switzerland (Schwaller) 🔨	0	2	0	0	1	0	0	2	0	1	6
Latvia (Barone)	0	0	1	1	0	1	0	0	1	0	4

Sheet D	1	2	3	4	5	6	7	8	9	10	Final
Sweden (Dryburgh) 🔨	0	2	0	0	6	0	1	0	1	X	10
South Korea (Kang)	0	0	2	1	0	1	0	1	0	X	5

Sheet E	1	2	3	4	5	6	7	8	9	10	11	Final
Canada (Ladouceur)	0	1	0	1	0	0	1	1	0	1	0	5
Japan (Yamamoto) 🔨	0	0	0	0	3	1	0	0	1	0	1	6

=== Playoffs ===
Semifinal
1	Norway	4
4	Sweden	5
2	United States	3
3	Japan	7

Final
4	Sweden	4
3	Japan	7

Bronze medal game
1	Norway	6
2	United States	10

==== Semifinals ====
Saturday, May 21, 19:00

Sheet B	1	2	3	4	5	6	7	8	9	10	Final
Norway (Mesloe) 🔨	2	0	0	0	1	0	0	0	1	0	4
Sweden (Dryburgh)	0	0	0	3	0	0	0	1	0	1	5

Player percentages
Norway		Sweden	
Ingeborg Forbregd	93%	Moa Nilsson	71%
Nora Østgård	79%	Moa Tjärnlund	88%
Torild Bjørnstad	80%	Thea Orefjord	84%
Eirin Mesloe	79%	Moa Dryburgh	83%
Total	83%	Total	81%

Sheet D	1	2	3	4	5	6	7	8	9	10	Final
United States (Strouse) 🔨	0	0	0	1	0	2	0	0	0	X	3
Japan (Yamamoto)	0	1	1	0	1	0	0	1	3	X	7

Player percentages
United States		Japan	
Susan Dudt	66%	Sae Yamamoto	84%
Sydney Mullaney	46%	Yui Ueno	88%
Anne O'Hara	65%	Yuina Miura	73%
Delaney Strouse	69%	Miyu Ueno	75%
Total	61%	Total	80%

==== Bronze medal game ====
Sunday, May 22, 14:00

Sheet A	1	2	3	4	5	6	7	8	9	10	Final
Norway (Mesloe) 🔨	1	0	0	1	0	3	1	0	0	0	6
United States (Strouse)	0	2	1	0	1	0	0	2	2	2	10

Player percentages
Norway		United States	
Ingeborg Forbregd	83%	Susan Dudt	93%
Nora Østgård	75%	Sydney Mullaney	65%
Torild Bjørnstad	61%	Anne O'Hara	70%
Eirin Mesloe	55%	Delaney Strouse	74%
Total	68%	Total	75%

==== Final ====
Sunday, May 22, 14:00

Sheet C	1	2	3	4	5	6	7	8	9	10	Final
Sweden (Dryburgh)	0	1	1	0	1	0	0	1	0	0	4
Japan (Yamamoto) 🔨	1	0	0	2	0	1	1	0	1	1	7

Player percentages
Sweden		Japan	
Moa Nilsson	93%	Sae Yamamoto	86%
Moa Tjärnlund	80%	Yui Ueno	66%
Thea Orefjord	71%	Yuina Miura	75%
Moa Dryburgh	60%	Miyu Ueno	74%
Total	76%	Total	75%

=== Final standings ===
Key
Teams relegated to 2023 World Junior-B Curling Championships

Place	Team
1st place, gold medalist(s)	Japan
2nd place, silver medalist(s)	Sweden
3rd place, bronze medalist(s)	United States
4	Norway
5	Switzerland
6	Latvia
7	Scotland
8	South Korea
9	Canada
10	Denmark
