= 2022 World Junior-B Curling Championships (January) =

- Host city: Lohja, Finland
- Arena: Kisakallio Sports Institute
- Dates: January 3–14

The 2022 World Junior-B Curling Championships was being held from January 3 to 14 at the Kisakallio Sports Institute in Lohja, Finland. The top three men's and women's teams were to qualify for the 2022 World Junior Curling Championships.

On January 4, the Hungarian men's team (Lőrinc Tatár, Ottó Kalocsay, Raul Kárász and Milan Tüske) had to withdraw from the competition due to a positive COVID-19 case within the team. The following day, members of Teams Chinese Taipei, Spain and Slovenia all confirmed positive cases within their teams. On January 6, World Curling Federation cancelled the event due to the outbreak of cases.

== Men ==
=== Teams ===
The teams are listed as follows:

Austria	Brazil	Chinese Taipei	Czech Republic	Denmark
Skip: Matthäus Hofer; Third: Johann Karg; Second: David Zott; Lead: Moritz Jöchl	Skip: Vitor Melo; Third: Nuno Rodrigues; Second: Kyron Suhan; Lead: Arthur Camelo; Alternate: Michael Velve	Skip: Samuel Chang; Third: Kyle Cheung; Second: Ethan Hung; Lead: Darren Lee	Skip: Vít Chabičovský; Third: David Jákl; Second: Marek Bříza; Lead: Daniel Peter; Alternate: Aleš Hercok	Skip: Jonathan Vilandt; Third: Jacob Schmidt; Second: Alexander Qvist; Lead: Kasper Jurlander Boge; Alternate: Nikki Jensen
England	France	Hong Kong	Hungary	Italy
Skip: Jotham Sugden; Third: Felix Whitticase; Second: Archer Woods; Lead: Harry Pinnell	Skip: Eddy Mercier; Third: Killian Gaudin; Second: Leo Tuaz; Lead: Damien Henry; Alternate: Steven Henry	Skip: Cheng Ching-nam; Third: Yew Cheuk-yin; Second: Lai Chung-hei Jonas; Lead: Cheng Ching-kiu; Alternate: Cheng Ching-him	Skip: Lőrinc Tatár; Third: Ottó Kalocsay; Second: Raul Kárász; Lead: Milan Tüske	Skip: Giacomo Colli; Third: Francesco de Zanna; Second: Simone Piffer; Lead: Davide Moser; Alternate: Daniel Casagrande
Japan	Kazakhstan	Latvia	Netherlands	Norway
Skip: Takumi Maeda; Third: Uryu Kamikawa; Second: Hiroki Maeda; Lead: Asei Nakahara; Alternate: Hayato Sato	Skip: Madiyar Korabayev; Third: Azizbek Nadirbayev; Second: Aidos Alliyar; Lead: Adil Zhumagozha; Alternate: Arman Irzhanov	Skip: Robert Reinis; Third: Aleksandrs Baranovskis; Second: Renards Dzalbe; Lead: Roberts Ceimers; Alternate: Ričards Vonda	Fourth: Tobias van den Hurk; Skip: Simon Spits; Second: Floris Ros; Lead: Hessel Janssens	Fourth: Grunde Buraas; Skip: Lukas Høstmælingen; Second: Magnus Lilleboe; Lead: Tinius Nordbye; Alternate: Sander Moen
Slovenia	South Korea	Spain	Turkey	
Skip: Bine Sever; Third: Jakob Omerzel; Second: Javor Brin Zelinka; Lead: Maks Omerzel; Alternate: Nejc Vidmar	Skip: Lee Jae-beom; Third: Kim Eun-bin; Second: Pyo Jeong-min; Lead: Choi Jae-hyuk	Skip: Luiz Gómez; Third: Aleix Raubert; Second: Oriol Gastó; Lead: Ismael Mingorance; Alternate: Eneko Saez de Ocariz	Skip: Kadir Polat; Third: Murat Sarıkaya; Second: Serkan Karagöz; Lead: Muhammet Eren Yıldız; Alternate: Selahattin Eser	

=== Round-robin standings ===
After Draw 10

Key
Teams to Playoffs

Group A	Skip	W	L	W–L	DSC
Norway	Lukas Høstmælingen	4	0	–	34.47
Denmark	Jonathan Vilandt	3	1	–	81.80
Spain	Luiz Gómez	3	2	–	62.92
Slovenia	Bine Sever	2	2	1–0	95.57
Brazil	Vitor Melo	2	2	0–1	59.24
Hungary	Lőrinc Tatár	0	4	–	199.60
Chinese Taipei	Samuel Chang	0	5	–	133.99

Group B	Skip	W	L	W–L	DSC
Italy	Giacomo Colli	5	0	–	46.44
Czech Republic	Vít Chabičovský	3	1	–	111.86
Turkey	Kadir Polat	2	2	–	41.99
Netherlands	Simon Spits	2	2	–	126.61
Latvia	Robert Reinis	1	4	–	101.51
Hong Kong	Cheng Ching-nam	0	4	–	110.77

Group C	Skip	W	L	W–L	DSC
Japan	Takumi Maeda	5	0	–	40.91
South Korea	Lee Jae-beom	4	1	–	58.94
England	Jotham Sugden	3	2	–	79.74
Austria	Matthäus Hofer	1	4	1–1	74.98
Kazakhstan	Madiyar Korabayev	1	4	1–1	78.76
France	Eddy Mercier	1	4	1–1	107.23

Group A Round Robin Summary Table
Pos.	Country	Brazil	Chinese Taipei	Denmark	Hungary	Norway	Slovenia	Spain	Record
5	Brazil	—N/a	W–L	D11	W–L	D12	5–7	2–8	2–2
7	Chinese Taipei	L–W	—	1–9	D11	1–14	L–L	7–10	0–5
2	Denmark	D11	9–1	—	D12	3–7	7–6	7–3	3–1
6	Hungary	L–W	D11	D12	—	L–W	L–W	L–W	0–4
1	Norway	D12	14–1	7–3	W–L	—	D11	9–3	4–0
4	Slovenia	7–5	L–L	6–7	W–L	D11	—	D12	2–2
3	Spain	8–2	10–7	3–7	W–L	3–9	D12	—	3–2

Group B Round Robin Summary Table
Pos.	Country	Czech Republic	Hong Kong	Italy	Latvia	Netherlands	Turkey	Record
2	Czech Republic	—	D12	5–9	8–3	8–3	12–5	3–1
6	Hong Kong	D12	—	1–17	2–12	2–9	3–10	0–4
1	Italy	9–5	17–1	—	10–1	6–2	8–3	5–0
5	Latvia	3–8	12–2	1–10	—	4–9	1–9	1–4
4	Netherlands	3–8	9–2	2–6	9–4	—	D12	2–2
3	Turkey	5–12	10–3	3–8	9–1	D12	—	2–2

Group C Round Robin Summary Table
Pos.	Country	Austria	England	France	Japan	Kazakhstan	South Korea	Record
4	Austria	—	5–10	4–8	3–8	7–5	4–6	1–4
3	England	10–5	—	5–3	2–9	5–3	4–8	3–2
6	France	8–4	3–5	—	2–7	5–6	4–6	1–4
1	Japan	8–3	9–2	7–2	—	11–1	7–1	5–0
5	Kazakhstan	5–7	3–5	6–5	1–11	—	4–10	1–4
2	South Korea	6–4	8–4	6–4	1–7	10–4	—	4–1

=== Round-robin results ===
All draw times are listed in Eastern European Time (UTC+02:00).

==== Draw 1 ====
Monday, January 3, 9:00

Sheet B	1	2	3	4	5	6	7	8	Final
Czech Republic (Chabičovský)	0	4	1	0	3	0	4	X	12
Turkey (Polat) 🔨	1	0	0	1	0	3	0	X	5

Sheet D	1	2	3	4	5	6	7	8	Final
Norway (Høstmælingen) 🔨	2	0	1	0	2	0	2	X	7
Denmark (Vilandt)	0	1	0	1	0	1	0	X	3

Sheet E	1	2	3	4	5	6	7	8	Final
Slovenia (Sever)	0	2	2	0	0	1	0	2	7
Brazil (Melo) 🔨	1	0	0	2	0	0	2	0	5

==== Draw 2 ====
Monday, January 3, 14:00

Sheet A	1	2	3	4	5	6	7	8	Final
South Korea (Lee) 🔨	4	0	2	0	4	0	0	X	10
Kazakhstan (Korabayev)	0	1	0	1	0	2	0	X	4

Sheet B	1	2	3	4	5	6	7	8	Final
Chinese Taipei (Chang) 🔨	0	1	0	4	0	2	0	0	7
Spain (Gómez)	2	0	3	0	2	0	2	1	10

Sheet C	1	2	3	4	5	6	7	8	Final
Italy (Colli)	3	2	4	3	0	5	X	X	17
Hong Kong (Cheng) 🔨	0	0	0	0	1	0	X	X	1

Sheet D	1	2	3	4	5	6	7	8	Final
Austria (Hofer)	0	2	1	0	1	0	1	X	5
England (Sugden) 🔨	5	0	0	3	0	2	0	X	10

Sheet E	1	2	3	4	5	6	7	8	Final
France (Mercier)	0	1	0	0	0	1	X	X	2
Japan (Maeda) 🔨	3	0	2	1	1	0	X	X	7

==== Draw 3 ====
Monday, January 3, 19:00

Sheet A	1	2	3	4	5	6	7	8	Final
Chinese Taipei (Chang)	0	1	0	0	0	0	X	X	1
Norway (Høstmælingen) 🔨	2	0	1	4	2	5	X	X	14

Sheet B	1	2	3	4	5	6	7	8	Final
Latvia (Reinis)	2	0	0	1	0	1	0	X	4
Netherlands (Spits) 🔨	0	4	2	0	1	0	2	X	9

Sheet C	1	2	3	4	5	6	7	8	Final
Hungary (Tatár)	X	X	X	X	X	X	X	X	L
Slovenia (Sever) 🔨	X	X	X	X	X	X	X	X	W

Sheet D	1	2	3	4	5	6	7	8	Final
Spain (Gómez) 🔨	0	1	3	0	2	0	2	X	8
Brazil (Melo)	1	0	0	0	0	1	0	X	2

==== Draw 4 ====
Tuesday, January 4, 9:00

Sheet A	1	2	3	4	5	6	7	8	Final
Denmark (Vilandt)	2	2	0	1	2	0	0	0	7
Slovenia (Sever) 🔨	0	0	2	0	0	1	2	1	6

Sheet B	1	2	3	4	5	6	7	8	Final
England (Sugden) 🔨	1	0	1	0	2	1	0	0	5
France (Mercier)	0	0	0	1	0	0	2	0	3

Sheet C	1	2	3	4	5	6	7	8	Final
South Korea (Lee)	0	0	0	0	0	1	0	X	1
Japan (Maeda) 🔨	0	1	1	3	1	0	1	X	7

Sheet D	1	2	3	4	5	6	7	8	Final
Turkey (Polat)	0	0	0	1	1	0	1	X	3
Italy (Colli) 🔨	1	1	2	0	0	4	0	X	8

Sheet E	1	2	3	4	5	6	7	8	Final
Hong Kong (Cheng)	1	0	0	0	1	0	X	X	2
Latvia (Reinis) 🔨	0	5	4	1	0	2	X	X	12

==== Draw 5 ====
Tuesday, January 4, 14:00

Sheet A	1	2	3	4	5	6	7	8	Final
Brazil (Melo) 🔨	X	X	X	X	X	X	X	X	W
Hungary (Tatár)	X	X	X	X	X	X	X	X	L

Sheet B	1	2	3	4	5	6	7	8	Final
Denmark (Vilandt)	3	1	3	1	1	0	X	X	9
Chinese Taipei (Chang) 🔨	0	0	0	0	0	1	X	X	1

Sheet C	1	2	3	4	5	6	7	8	Final
Norway (Høstmælingen) 🔨	1	1	0	1	3	0	3	X	9
Spain (Gómez)	0	0	2	0	0	1	0	X	3

Sheet D	1	2	3	4	5	6	7	8	Final
Czech Republic (Chabičovský) 🔨	2	0	1	1	0	3	1	X	8
Netherlands (Spits)	0	2	0	0	1	0	0	X	3

Sheet E	1	2	3	4	5	6	7	8	Final
Austria (Hofer) 🔨	0	2	0	1	0	1	3	X	7
Kazakhstan (Korabayev)	2	0	2	0	1	0	0	X	5

==== Draw 6 ====
Tuesday, January 4, 19:00

Sheet A	1	2	3	4	5	6	7	8	Final
France (Mercier) 🔨	1	1	0	0	2	0	0	0	4
South Korea (Lee)	0	0	1	1	0	1	2	1	6

Sheet B	1	2	3	4	5	6	7	8	Final
Turkey (Polat) 🔨	1	1	2	4	0	1	X	X	9
Latvia (Reinis)	0	0	0	0	1	0	X	X	1

Sheet C	1	2	3	4	5	6	7	8	Final
Kazakhstan (Korabayev) 🔨	1	0	1	0	0	0	1	X	3
England (Sugden)	0	2	0	1	1	1	0	X	5

Sheet D	1	2	3	4	5	6	7	8	Final
Japan (Maeda) 🔨	0	2	0	4	0	2	X	X	8
Austria (Hofer)	1	0	1	0	1	0	X	X	3

Sheet E	1	2	3	4	5	6	7	8	Final
Italy (Colli) 🔨	2	0	2	1	1	0	3	X	9
Czech Republic (Chabičovský)	0	3	0	0	0	2	0	X	5

==== Draw 7 ====
Wednesday, January 5, 9:00

Sheet B	1	2	3	4	5	6	7	8	Final
Netherlands (Spits) 🔨	0	2	0	4	2	1	X	X	9
Hong Kong (Cheng)	1	0	1	0	0	0	X	X	2

Sheet C	1	2	3	4	5	6	7	8	Final
Chinese Taipei (Chang)	X	X	X	X	X	X	X	X	L
Brazil (Melo) 🔨	X	X	X	X	X	X	X	X	W

Sheet D	1	2	3	4	5	6	7	8	Final
Hungary (Tatár)	X	X	X	X	X	X	X	X	L
Spain (Gómez) 🔨	X	X	X	X	X	X	X	X	W

==== Draw 8 ====
Wednesday, January 5, 14:00

Sheet A	1	2	3	4	5	6	7	8	Final
Italy (Colli) 🔨	1	1	0	3	0	1	0	X	6
Netherlands (Spits)	0	0	0	0	1	0	1	X	2

Sheet B	1	2	3	4	5	6	7	8	Final
Norway (Høstmælingen) 🔨	X	X	X	X	X	X	X	X	W
Hungary (Tatár)	X	X	X	X	X	X	X	X	L

Sheet C	1	2	3	4	5	6	7	8	Final
Hong Kong (Cheng)	1	0	0	1	1	0	0	X	3
Turkey (Polat) 🔨	0	2	1	0	0	3	4	X	10

Sheet D	1	2	3	4	5	6	7	8	Final
Latvia (Reinis) 🔨	0	0	1	0	0	2	0	X	3
Czech Republic (Chabičovský)	1	0	0	3	2	0	2	X	8

Sheet E	1	2	3	4	5	6	7	8	Final
Spain (Gómez)	0	1	0	0	2	0	0	X	3
Denmark (Vilandt) 🔨	1	0	2	1	0	2	1	X	7

==== Draw 9 ====
Wednesday, January 5, 19:00

Sheet B	1	2	3	4	5	6	7	8	Final
Japan (Maeda) 🔨	1	2	2	3	0	3	X	X	11
Kazakhstan (Korabayev)	0	0	0	0	1	0	X	X	1

Sheet C	1	2	3	4	5	6	7	8	Final
France (Mercier) 🔨	3	0	1	0	2	1	1	X	8
Austria (Hofer)	0	2	0	2	0	0	0	X	4

Sheet D	1	2	3	4	5	6	7	8	Final
Slovenia (Sever)	X	X	X	X	X	X	X	X	L
Chinese Taipei (Chang)	X	X	X	X	X	X	X	X	L

Sheet E	1	2	3	4	5	6	7	8	Final
South Korea (Lee) 🔨	0	2	0	5	0	0	1	X	8
England (Sugden)	1	0	1	0	2	0	0	X	4

==== Draw 10 ====
Thursday, January 6, 9:00

Sheet A	1	2	3	4	5	6	7	8	Final
England (Sugden) 🔨	1	0	0	0	1	0	X	X	2
Japan (Maeda)	0	1	2	4	0	2	X	X	9

Sheet B	1	2	3	4	5	6	7	8	Final
Austria (Hofer) 🔨	3	0	0	0	1	0	0	X	4
South Korea (Lee)	0	0	1	0	0	2	3	X	6

Sheet C	1	2	3	4	5	6	7	8	Final
Latvia (Reinis)	0	0	0	0	0	1	X	X	1
Italy (Colli) 🔨	3	1	3	1	2	0	X	X	10

Sheet D	1	2	3	4	5	6	7	8	Final
Kazakhstan (Korabayev) 🔨	1	0	2	0	0	2	0	1	6
France (Mercier)	0	2	0	0	1	0	2	0	5

==== Draw 11 ====
Thursday, January 6, 14:00

Sheet B	1	2	3	4	5	6	7	8	Final
Brazil (Melo)									0
Denmark (Vilandt)									0

Sheet C	1	2	3	4	5	6	7	8	Final
Slovenia (Sever)									0
Norway (Høstmælingen)									0

Sheet D	1	2	3	4	5	6	7	8	Final
Hungary (Tatár)									0
Chinese Taipei (Chang)									0

==== Draw 12 ====
Thursday, January 6, 19:00

Sheet A	1	2	3	4	5	6	7	8	Final
Czech Republic (Chabičovský)									0
Hong Kong (Cheng)									0

Sheet B	1	2	3	4	5	6	7	8	Final
Spain (Gómez)									0
Slovenia (Sever)									0

Sheet C	1	2	3	4	5	6	7	8	Final
Denmark (Vilandt)									0
Hungary (Tatár)									0

Sheet D	1	2	3	4	5	6	7	8	Final
Brazil (Melo)									0
Norway (Høstmælingen)									0

Sheet E	1	2	3	4	5	6	7	8	Final
Netherlands (Spits)									0
Turkey (Polat)									0

=== Playoffs ===
Quarterfinals
1
8
4
5
2
7
3
6

Semifinals

Gold medal game
Third place

==== Quarterfinals ====
Friday, January 7, 13:00

Team	1	2	3	4	5	6	7	8	Final
									0
									0

Team	1	2	3	4	5	6	7	8	Final
									0
									0

Team	1	2	3	4	5	6	7	8	Final
									0
									0

Team	1	2	3	4	5	6	7	8	Final
									0
									0

==== Semifinals ====
Friday, January 7, 18:00

Team	1	2	3	4	5	6	7	8	Final
									0
									0

Team	1	2	3	4	5	6	7	8	Final
									0
									0

==== Bronze medal game ====
Saturday, January 8, 10:00

Team	1	2	3	4	5	6	7	8	Final
									0
									0

==== Gold medal game ====
Saturday, January 8, 10:00

Team	1	2	3	4	5	6	7	8	Final
									0
									0

=== Final standings ===
Key
Team Qualifies to the 2022 World Junior Curling Championships

Place	Team
1st place, gold medalist(s)	
2nd place, silver medalist(s)	
3rd place, bronze medalist(s)	
4	
5	
6	
7	
8	
9	
10	
11	
12	
13	
14	
15	
16	
17	
18	
19	

== Women ==
=== Teams ===
The teams are listed as follows:

Austria	Brazil	Croatia
Skip: Astrid Pfluegler; Third: Teresa Treichl; Second: Verena Pfluegler; Lead: Lisa Auer; Alternate: Emma Müller	Skip: Leticia Cid; Third: Gabriela Farias; Second: Melissa Sampaio; Lead: Isis Regadas; Alternate: Ana Teódoro	Skip: Luci Ana Pavelka; Third: Paula Princip; Second: Lucija Matanić; Lead: Ema Posavec; Alternate: Jelena Bukvić
Czech Republic	England	Germany
Fourth: Kristyna Farková; Skip: Julie Zelingrová; Second: Karolina Němcová; Lead: Klára Baudyšová; Alternate: Klára Koscelanská	Skip: Sydney Boyd; Third: Annabelle Martin; Second: Mia Andell; Lead: Anna Howey; Alternate: Libby Davies (Note: Davies is now known as Phoenix)	Fourth: Kim Sutor; Skip: Sara Messenzehl; Second: Zoé Antes; Lead: Elisa Scheuerl; Alternate: Anne Kapp
Hungary	Italy	Kazakhstan
Skip: Linda Joó; Third: Laura Karolina Nagy; Second: Dia Regina Dobor; Lead: Lola Olimpia Nagy; Alternate: Anna Bartalus	Skip: Marta Lo Deserto; Third: Federica Ghedina; Second: Francesca Ghedina; Lead: Erica Siorpaes; Alternate: Katia Sottsass	Skip: Angelina Ebauyer; Third: Tilsimay Alliyarova; Second: Yekaterina Kolykhalova; Lead: Regina Ebauyer; Alternate: Kristina Kolykhalova
Latvia	Netherlands	Norway
Skip: Evelīna Barone; Third: Rēzija Ieviņa; Second: Veronika Apse; Lead: Ērika Patrīcija Bitmete; Alternate: Letīcija Ieviņa	Skip: Lisenka Bomas; Third: Anandi Bomas; Second: Marit van Valkenhoef; Lead: Isis Stubbe; Alternate: Linde Nas	Skip: Eirin Mesloe; Third: Torild Bjørnstad; Second: Nora Østgård; Lead: Ingeborg Forbregd
Scotland	Slovakia	Slovenia
Skip: Fay Henderson; Third: Katie McMillan; Second: Lisa Davie; Lead: Holly Wilkie-Milne; Alternate: Robyn Mitchell	Skip: Melánia Kováčiková; Third: Nina Summerova; Second: Paulina Hajduk; Lead: Ema Valachova; Alternate: Zora Reilly	Fourth: Lea Žemlja; Skip: Ajda Zaveljcina; Second: Maja Kučina; Lead: Ema Kavčič; Alternate: Pavla Kavčič
Spain	Turkey	United States
Skip: María Gómez; Third: Carmen Pérez; Second: Daniela García; Lead: Ana Vázquez; Alternate: Aurora González	Skip: Berfin Şengül; Third: İclal Karaman; Second: İfayet Şafak Çalıkuşu; Lead: İlknur Ürüşan; Alternate: Selenay Diler	Skip: Delaney Strouse; Third: Anne O'Hara; Second: Sydney Mullaney; Lead: Susan Dudt; Alternate: Kaitlin Murphy

=== Round-robin standings ===
Key
Teams to Playoffs

Group A	Skip	W	L	W–L	DSC
Austria	Astrid Pfluegler	0	0	–	0.00
Brazil	Leticia Cid	0	0	–	0.00
Italy	Marta Lo Deserto	0	0	–	0.00
Norway	Eirin Mesloe	0	0	–	0.00
Slovenia	Ajda Zaveljcina	0	0	–	0.00
Turkey	Berfin Şengül	0	0	–	0.00

Group B	Skip	W	L	W–L	DSC
Croatia	Luci Ana Pavelka	0	0	–	0.00
Czech Republic	Julie Zelingrová	0	0	–	0.00
England	Sydney Boyd	0	0	–	0.00
Scotland	Fay Henderson	0	0	–	0.00
Spain	María Gómez	0	0	–	0.00
United States	Delaney Strouse	0	0	–	0.00

Group C	Skip	W	L	W–L	DSC
Germany	Sara Messenzehl	0	0	–	0.00
Hungary	Linda Joó	0	0	–	0.00
Kazakhstan	Angelina Ebauyer	0	0	–	0.00
Latvia	Evelīna Barone	0	0	–	0.00
Netherlands	Lisenka Bomas	0	0	–	0.00
Slovakia	Melánia Kováčiková	0	0	–	0.00

Group A Round Robin Summary Table
Pos.	Country	Austria	Brazil	Italy	Norway	Slovenia	Turkey	Record
	Austria	—	D5	D8	D3	D4	D1	–
	Brazil	D5	—	D6	D1	D3	D8	–
	Italy	D8	D6	—	D5	D1	D3	–
	Norway	D3	D1	D5	—	D8	D6	–
	Slovenia	D4	D3	D1	D8	—	D5	–
	Turkey	D1	D8	D3	D6	D5	—	–

Group B Round Robin Summary Table
Pos.	Country	Croatia	Czech Republic	England	Scotland	Spain	United States	Record
	Croatia	—	D8	D9	D2	D5	D1	–
	Czech Republic	D8	—	D2	D4	D3	D9	–
	England	D9	D2	—	D7	D1	D5	–
	Scotland	D2	D4	D7	—	D9	D3	–
	Spain	D5	D3	D1	D9	—	D7	–
	United States	D1	D9	D5	D3	D7	—	–

Group C Round Robin Summary Table
Pos.	Country	Germany	Hungary	Kazakhstan	Latvia	Netherlands	Slovakia	Record
	Germany	—	D4	D2	D7	D8	D6	–
	Hungary	D4	—	D6	D2	D7	D9	–
	Kazakhstan	D2	D6	—	D9	D4	D7	–
	Latvia	D7	D2	D9	—	D6	D4	–
	Netherlands	D8	D7	D4	D6	—	D2	–
	Slovakia	D6	D9	D7	D4	D2	—	–

=== Round-robin results ===
All draw times are listed in Eastern European Time (UTC+02:00).

==== Draw 1 ====
Monday, January 10, 9:00

Sheet A	1	2	3	4	5	6	7	8	Final
Croatia (Pavelka)									0
United States (Strouse)									0

Sheet B	1	2	3	4	5	6	7	8	Final
Slovenia (Zaveljcina)									0
Italy (Lo Deserto)									0

Sheet C	1	2	3	4	5	6	7	8	Final
Austria (Pfluegler)									0
Turkey (Şengül)									0

Sheet D	1	2	3	4	5	6	7	8	Final
England (Boyd)									0
Spain (Gómez)									0

Sheet E	1	2	3	4	5	6	7	8	Final
Brazil (Cid)									0
Norway (Mesloe)									0

==== Draw 2 ====
Monday, January 10, 14:00

Sheet A	1	2	3	4	5	6	7	8	Final
Slovakia (Kováčiková)									0
Netherlands (Bomas)									0

Sheet B	1	2	3	4	5	6	7	8	Final
Germany (Messenzehl)									0
Kazakhstan (Ebauyer)									0

Sheet C	1	2	3	4	5	6	7	8	Final
Czech Republic (Zelingrová)									0
England (Boyd)									0

Sheet D	1	2	3	4	5	6	7	8	Final
Croatia (Pavelka)									0
Scotland (Henderson)									0

Sheet E	1	2	3	4	5	6	7	8	Final
Hungary (Joó)									0
Latvia (Barone)									0

==== Draw 3 ====
Monday, January 10, 19:00

Sheet A	1	2	3	4	5	6	7	8	Final
Spain (Gómez)									0
Czech Republic (Zelingrová)									0

Sheet B	1	2	3	4	5	6	7	8	Final
Austria (Pfluegler)									0
Norway (Mesloe)									0

Sheet C	1	2	3	4	5	6	7	8	Final
United States (Strouse)									0
Scotland (Henderson)									0

Sheet D	1	2	3	4	5	6	7	8	Final
Slovenia (Zaveljcina)									0
Brazil (Cid)									0

Sheet E	1	2	3	4	5	6	7	8	Final
Turkey (Şengül)									0
Italy (Lo Deserto)									0

==== Draw 4 ====
Tuesday, January 11, 9:00

Sheet A	1	2	3	4	5	6	7	8	Final
Austria (Pfluegler)									0
Slovenia (Zaveljcina)									0

Sheet B	1	2	3	4	5	6	7	8	Final
Slovakia (Kováčiková)									0
Latvia (Barone)									0

Sheet C	1	2	3	4	5	6	7	8	Final
Netherlands (Bomas)									0
Kazakhstan (Ebauyer)									0

Sheet D	1	2	3	4	5	6	7	8	Final
Hungary (Joó)									0
Germany (Messenzehl)									0

Sheet E	1	2	3	4	5	6	7	8	Final
Czech Republic (Zelingrová)									0
Scotland (Henderson)									0

==== Draw 5 ====
Tuesday, January 11, 14:00

Sheet A	1	2	3	4	5	6	7	8	Final
Italy (Lo Deserto)									0
Norway (Mesloe)									0

Sheet B	1	2	3	4	5	6	7	8	Final
Brazil (Cid)									0
Austria (Pfluegler)									0

Sheet C	1	2	3	4	5	6	7	8	Final
England (Boyd)									0
United States (Strouse)									0

Sheet D	1	2	3	4	5	6	7	8	Final
Spain (Gómez)									0
Croatia (Pavelka)									0

Sheet E	1	2	3	4	5	6	7	8	Final
Slovenia (Zaveljcina)									0
Turkey (Şengül)									0

==== Draw 6 ====
Tuesday, January 11, 19:00

Sheet A	1	2	3	4	5	6	7	8	Final
Germany (Messenzehl)									0
Slovakia (Kováčiková)									0

Sheet B	1	2	3	4	5	6	7	8	Final
Norway (Mesloe)									0
Turkey (Şengül)									0

Sheet C	1	2	3	4	5	6	7	8	Final
Brazil (Cid)									0
Italy (Lo Deserto)									0

Sheet D	1	2	3	4	5	6	7	8	Final
Latvia (Barone)									0
Netherlands (Bomas)									0

Sheet E	1	2	3	4	5	6	7	8	Final
Kazakhstan (Ebauyer)									0
Hungary (Joó)									0

==== Draw 7 ====
Wednesday, January 12, 9:00

Sheet A	1	2	3	4	5	6	7	8	Final
Scotland (Henderson)									0
England (Boyd)									0

Sheet B	1	2	3	4	5	6	7	8	Final
Hungary (Joó)									0
Netherlands (Bomas)									0

Sheet C	1	2	3	4	5	6	7	8	Final
Germany (Messenzehl)									0
Latvia (Barone)									0

Sheet D	1	2	3	4	5	6	7	8	Final
Kazakhstan (Ebauyer)									0
Slovakia (Kováčiková)									0

Sheet E	1	2	3	4	5	6	7	8	Final
Spain (Gómez)									0
United States (Strouse)									0

==== Draw 8 ====
Wednesday, January 12, 14:00

Sheet A	1	2	3	4	5	6	7	8	Final
Turkey (Şengül)									0
Brazil (Cid)									0

Sheet B	1	2	3	4	5	6	7	8	Final
Croatia (Pavelka)									0
Czech Republic (Zelingrová)									0

Sheet C	1	2	3	4	5	6	7	8	Final
Norway (Mesloe)									0
Slovenia (Zaveljcina)									0

Sheet D	1	2	3	4	5	6	7	8	Final
Italy (Lo Deserto)									0
Austria (Pfluegler)									0

Sheet E	1	2	3	4	5	6	7	8	Final
Netherlands (Bomas)									0
Germany (Messenzehl)									0

==== Draw 9 ====
Wednesday, January 12, 19:00

Sheet A	1	2	3	4	5	6	7	8	Final
Latvia (Barone)									0
Kazakhstan (Ebauyer)									0

Sheet B	1	2	3	4	5	6	7	8	Final
Scotland (Henderson)									0
Spain (Gómez)									0

Sheet C	1	2	3	4	5	6	7	8	Final
Slovakia (Kováčiková)									0
Hungary (Joó)									0

Sheet D	1	2	3	4	5	6	7	8	Final
United States (Strouse)									0
Czech Republic (Zelingrová)									0

Sheet E	1	2	3	4	5	6	7	8	Final
England (Boyd)									0
Croatia (Pavelka)									0

=== Playoffs ===
Quarterfinals
1
8
4
5
2
7
3
6

Semifinals

Gold medal game
Third place

==== Quarterfinals ====
Thursday, January 13, 13:00

Team	1	2	3	4	5	6	7	8	Final
									0
									0

Team	1	2	3	4	5	6	7	8	Final
									0
									0

Team	1	2	3	4	5	6	7	8	Final
									0
									0

Team	1	2	3	4	5	6	7	8	Final
									0
									0

==== Semifinals ====
Thursday, January 13, 18:00

Team	1	2	3	4	5	6	7	8	Final
									0
									0

Team	1	2	3	4	5	6	7	8	Final
									0
									0

==== Bronze medal game ====
Friday, January 14, 10:00

Team	1	2	3	4	5	6	7	8	Final
									0
									0

==== Gold medal game ====
Friday, January 14, 10:00

Team	1	2	3	4	5	6	7	8	Final
									0
									0

=== Final standings ===
Key
Team Qualifies to the 2022 World Junior Curling Championships

Place	Team
1st place, gold medalist(s)	
2nd place, silver medalist(s)	
3rd place, bronze medalist(s)	
4	
5	
6	
7	
8	
9	
10	
11	
12	
13	
14	
15	
16	
17	
18	
