= Lukas Høstmælingen =

Norwegian curling player

- Curler
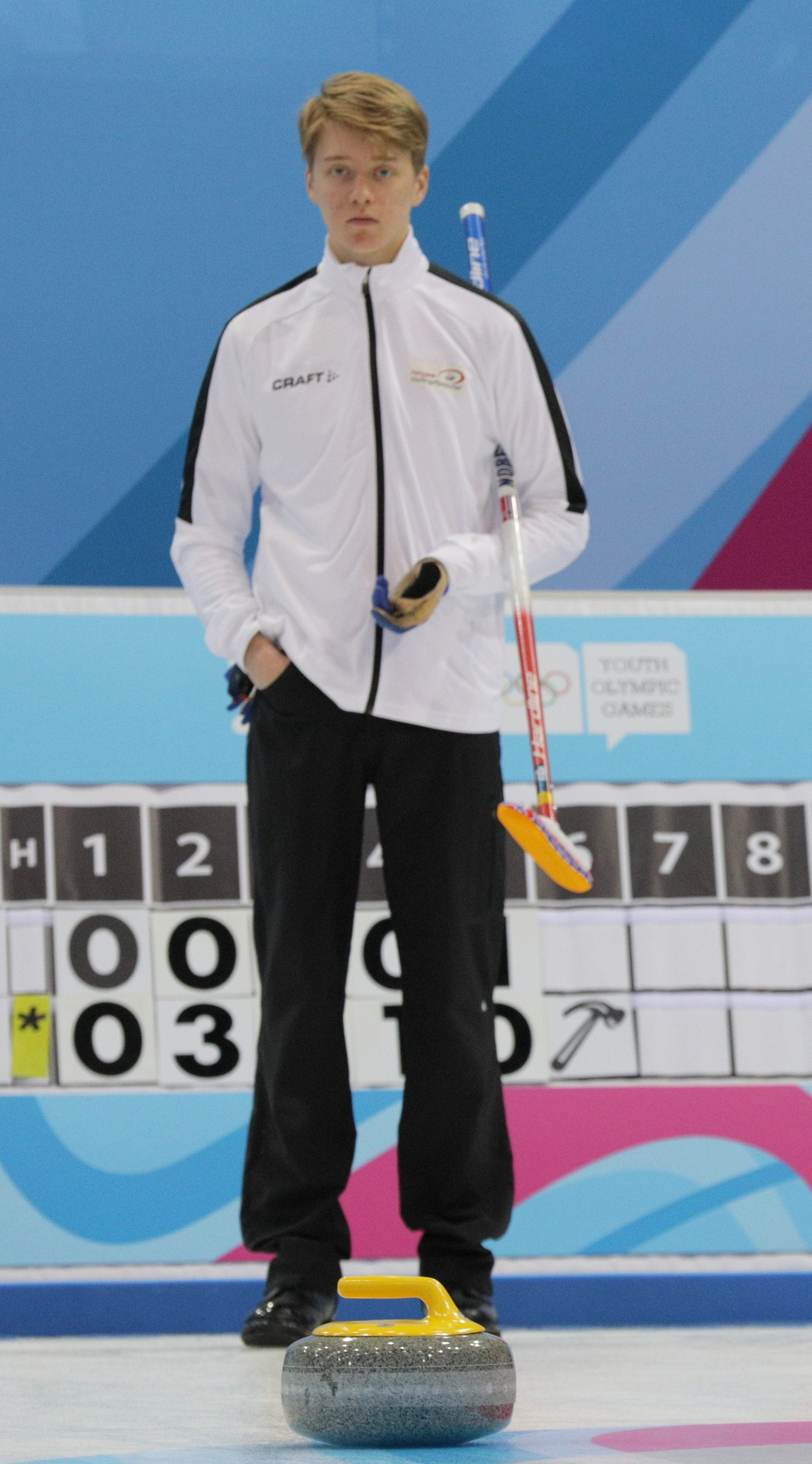
- Born: 5 July 2003 (age 23); Lillehammer, Norway

Team
- Curling club: Lillehammer CK, Lillehammer
- Skip: Lukas Høstmælingen
- Third: Tinius Haslev Nordbye
- Second: Magnus Lillebø
- Lead: Eskild Eriksen

Curling career
- Member Association: Norway
Medal record
Men's curling
Representing Norway
World Junior Championships
| Gold medal – first place | 2024 Lohja |
| Silver medal – second place | 2025 Cortina d'Ampezzo |
World University Games
| Gold medal – first place | 2025 Turin |
Youth Olympics
| Gold medal – first place | 2020 Lausanne |
Norwegian Men's Championship
| Gold medal – first place | 2025 Halden |
| Silver medal – second place | 2023 Oppdal |
| Bronze medal – third place | 2022 Trondheim |
| Bronze medal – third place | 2020 Oslo |

Lukas Kjeverud Høstmælingen (born 5 July, 2003) is a Norwegian curler from Lillehammer. He is a World Junior, World University and Youth Olympic champion.

== Career ==
=== Youth ===
Høstmælingen began curling after the expansion of the Eidsiva Arena for the 2016 Winter Youth Olympics. Høstmælingen was a spectator of the curling events there, and was inspired to compete in the future. Four years later, he was the skip of the Norwegian team at the 2020 Winter Youth Olympics. The team, which also consisted of Grunde Burås, Nora Østgård, Ingeborg Forbregd, finished 3–2 in group play, and then won all three of their playoff games to claim the gold medal. In the mixed doubles event, he was paired with Estonia's Natali Vedro. They lost to Italian Marta Lo Deserto and Spaniard Aleix Raubert in their only game.

Høstmælingen skipped the Norwegian junior men's team at the 2022 World Junior-B Curling Championships, which was suspended due to the COVID-19 pandemic. The team, which also consisted of Burås, Magnus Lillebø and Tinius Haslev Nordbye had won all four of their games before the halting of the competition. A few months later, the team competed at the 2022 World Junior Curling Championships, with Høstmælingen as the alternate. They ended up finishing fourth, with Høstmælingen playing in just one game.

Høstmælingen skipped the Norwegian junior men's team again at the 2023 World Junior Curling Championships, with Burås (throwing fourth), Lillebø and Nordbye. With Høstmælingen at the helm, the rink finished the round robin with a 5–4 record, squeaking into the playoffs. There, they lost both of their games, settling for fourth place.

Høstmælingen, Nordbye, Lillebø and new teammate Eskil Eriksen represented Norway at the 2024 World Junior Curling Championships. There, the team finished the round robin with a 7–2 record. In the playoffs, they defeated the United States (skipped by Wesley Wendling) and then Italy (Stefano Gilli) in the final to claim the gold medal. It was Norway's first ever men's World Junior title, and the first time Norway had made the final since 1983. After the event, Høstmælingen was awarded with the event's Sportsmanship Award. The team were back the following year for the 2025 World Junior Curling Championships, where they capped the round robin with another 7–2 record. They defeated Scotland's Orrin Carson rink in the semifinal, before making it to the final again, in a rematch of 2024 final against Italy. This time the Italians, who were now skipped by Stefano Spiller were victorious.

Also in 2025, Høstmælingen, Burås, Lillebø and Nordbye represented Norway at the 2025 Winter World University Games. There, the team finished the round robin portion with an 8–1 record. In the semifinal, they beat Switzerland's Jan Iseli, before defeating the United States (Caden Hebert) in the final. A few months later, Høstmælingen and his university rink won the 2025 Norwegian Men's Curling Championship, defeating Team Magnus Ramsfjell in the final. They became the first team from Lillehammer to win the event in 68 years.

=== Men's ===
Following his junior career, Høstmælingen, with Nordbye, Lillebø and Eriksen won the 2026 Tallinn Men's Challenger.

== Personal life ==
As of 2025, he was dating Scottish curler Robyn Munro. He attended the University of Inland Norway and was on the directing team for the movie Onkel Egg.
