= 2023 World Junior-B Curling Championships =

- Host city: Lohja, Finland
- Arena: Kisakallio Sports Institute
- Dates: December 8–19
- Men's winner: Canada
- Skip: Johnson Tao
- Third: Jaedon Neuert
- Second: Zachary Davies
- Lead: Adam Naugler
- Coach: Skip Wilson
- Finalist: United States (Wendling)
- Women's winner: China
- Skip: Li Ziru
- Third: Zhang Jiaqi
- Second: Zhang Yujie
- Lead: Gao Ya
- Alternate: Zhang Yuning
- Coach: Li Hongchen
- Finalist: Canada (Plett)

The 2023 World Junior-B Curling Championships were held from December 8 to 19 at the Kisakallio Sports Institute in Lohja, Finland. Following the decision of the Finnish Curling Association to decline their host spots in both the men's and women's tournaments at the 2024 World Junior Curling Championships, four women's (China, Canada, Germany, and Turkey) and four men's teams (Canada, United States, Denmark, and New Zealand) were promoted to the 2024 World Junior Curling Championships.

== Men ==
=== Teams ===
The teams are listed as follows:

Australia	Austria	Brazil	Canada	Czech Republic
Skip: Charlie Ryan; Third: Thomas Bence; Second: Benjamin Wayman; Lead: Flynn Colins; Alternate: Bailey Ryan	Skip: Matthäus Hofer; Third: Johann Karg; Second: David Zott; Lead: Moritz Jöchl; Alternate: Christoph Neumayr	Skip: Vitor Melo; Third: Nuno Rodrigues; Second: Kyron Suhan; Lead: Arthur Camelo	Skip: Johnson Tao; Third: Jaedon Neuert; Second: Zachary Davies; Lead: Adam Naugler	Skip: Vít Chabičovský; Third: Ondřej Bodlák; Second: Krystof Zdarsky; Lead: David Skacha; Alternate: Jakub Matějíček
Denmark	England	Hong Kong	Hungary	Japan
Skip: Jacob Schmidt; Third: Alexander Qvist; Second: Kasper Jurlander Bøge; Lead: Johnathan Vilandt; Alternate: Nikki Jensen	Skip: Benjamin Holcombe; Third: Toby Martin; Second: Owen Brackpool; Lead: Isaac Blakeley; Alternate: Robert Mechem	Skip: Cheng Ching-nam; Third: Cheng Ching-him; Second: Cheng Ching-kiu; Lead: Lai Chung-hei Jonas; Alternate: Chung Kwan Chak	Skip: Lőrinc Tatár; Third: Raul Karasz; Second: Kristof Szarvas; Lead: Milan Tueske	Skip: Ryo Aoki; Third: Takuto Ouchi; Second: Rio Hayashi; Lead: Naoki Kanazawa; Alternate: Haruto Ouchi
Kazakhstan	Latvia	New Zealand	Poland	Romania
Skip: Aidos Alliyar; Third: Ibragim Tastemir; Second: Arman Irjanov; Lead: Georgiy Skupnevskiy	Skip: Robert Reinis Buncis; Third: Kristaps Zass; Second: Toms Sondors; Lead: Aleksandrs Baranovskis; Alternate: Deniss Smirnovs	Skip: Sam Flanagan; Third: Willian Becker; Second: Darcy Nevill; Lead: Hunter Burke; Alternate: Jed Nevill	Skip: Antoni Frynia; Third: Kacper Mucha; Second: Bartlomiej Mosiolek; Lead: Jan Witkowski; Alternate: Michal Kolano	Skip: Dan Ghergie; Fourth: Tudor Pop; Third: Toma Matei Felecan; Lead: Tudor Mihalca; Alternate: Catalin Vancea
Slovenia	South Korea	Spain	Sweden	Turkey
Skip: Ernest Erjavec Bizjak; Third: Zan Krapez; Second: Jure Marvic; Lead: Bor Kelemina	Skip: Kim Dae-hyun; Third: Lee Woo-jung; Second: Park Seong-min; Lead: Kwon Juni; Alternate: Shin Eun-jun	Skip: Aleix Raubert; Third: Ismael Mingorance; Second: Javier Carasa; Lead: Eneko Saez de Ocariz; Alternate: Oriol Gasto	Skip: Axel Landelius; Third: Alexander Palm; Second: Olle Moberg; Lead: Dante Alexander; Alternate: Vilmer Nygren	Skip: Selahttin Eser; Third: Mehmet Fatih Bayramoglu; Second: Bilal Emre; Lead: Yunus Emre Nerse; Alternate: Muhammed Taha Zenit
Ukraine	United States			
Skip: Eduard Nikolov; Third: Yaroslav Shchur; Second: Artem Suhak; Lead: Vladyslav Koval; Alternate: Artem Shlyk	Skip: Wesley Wendling; Third: Kevin Tuma; Second: Jackson Bestland; Lead: Jackson Armstrong; Alternate: Caden Hebert			

=== Round-Robin standings ===
Final Round Robin Standings

Key
Teams to Playoffs

Group A	Skip	W	L	W–L	DSC
Sweden	Axel Landelius	7	0	–	47.07
Hungary	Lőrinc Tatár	5	2	1–1	46.73
South Korea	Kim Dae-hyun	5	2	1–1	47.04
Czech Republic	Vít Chabičovský	5	2	1–1	68.60
Spain	Aleix Raubert	3	4	–	76.16
Australia	Charlie Ryan	2	5	–	80.41
Romania	Dan Ghergie	1	6	–	182.80
Slovenia	Ernest Erjavec Bizjak	0	7	–	149.38

Group B	Skip	W	L	W–L	DSC
Japan	Ryo Aoki	6	0	–	41.04
Ukraine	Eduard Nikolov	5	1	–	74.40
Canada	Johnson Tao	4	2	–	37.83
Austria	Matthäus Hofer	2	4	1–0	41.49
Turkey	Selahattin Eser	2	4	0–1	70.12
Kazakhstan	Aidos Alliyar	1	5	1–0	73.13
Poland	Antoni Frynia	1	5	0–1	40.97

Group C	Skip	W	L	W–L	DSC
New Zealand	Sam Flanagan	5	1	1–0	53.05
United States	Wesley Wendling	5	1	0–1	47.84
Denmark	Jacob Schmidt	4	2	1–0	39.80
Latvia	Robert Renis Buincis	4	2	0–1	72.76
Brazil	Vitor Melo	2	4	–	67.57
Hong Kong	Cheng Ching-nam	1	5	–	31.64
England	Benjamin Holcombe	0	6	–	83.80

Group A Round Robin Summary Table
Pos.	Country	Australia	Czech Republic	Hungary	Romania	Slovenia	South Korea	Spain	Sweden	Record
6	Australia	—	1–9	4–9	12–3	14–2	1–12	2–6	1–8	2–5
4	Czech Republic	9–1	—	3–6	15–1	19–1	5–2	7–1	4–5	5–2
2	Hungary	9–4	6–3	—	16–1	16–0	3–4	9–3	6–7	5–2
7	Romania	3–12	1–15	1–16	—	10–3	0–17	1–14	0–25	1–6
8	Slovenia	2–14	1–19	0–16	3–10	—	1–10	1–15	1–22	0–7
3	South Korea	12–1	2–5	4–3	17–0	10–1	—	6–2	4–5	5–2
5	Spain	6–2	1–7	3–9	14–1	15–1	2–6	—	4–10	3–4
1	Sweden	8–1	5–4	7–6	25–0	22–1	5–4	10–4	—	7–0

Group B Round Robin Summary Table
Pos.	Country	Austria	Brazil	Canada	England	Poland	Turkey	Ukraine	Record
4	Austria	—	5–7	6–7	4–1	4–6	11–5	5–9	2–4
3	Canada	7–5	—	3–6	7–2	7–2	11–2	3–6	4–2
1	Japan	7–6	6–3	—	9–2	10–2	8–5	7–3	6–0
6	Kazakhstan	1–4	2–7	2–9	—	5–4	4–9	2–6	1–5
7	Poland	6–4	2–7	2–10	4–5	—	5–6	3–8	1–5
5	Turkey	5–11	2–11	5–8	9–4	6–5	—	2–10	2–4
2	Ukraine	9–5	6–3	3–7	6–2	8–3	10–2	—	5–1

Group C Round Robin Summary Table
Pos.	Country	Brazil	Denmark	England	Hong Kong	Latvia	New Zealand	United States	Record
5	Brazil	—	3–10	8–6	8–7	4–5	4–10	5–10	2–4
3	Denmark	10–3	—	11–1	9–2	9–2	7–8	3–6	4–2
7	England	6–8	1–11	—	5–9	1–9	1–10	4–10	0–6
6	Hong Kong	7–8	2–9	9–5	—	5–8	4–5	6–8	1–5
4	Latvia	5–4	2–9	9–1	8–5	—	6–5	5–8	4–2
1	New Zealand	10–4	8–7	10–1	5–4	5–6	—	9–7	5–1
2	United States	10–5	6–3	10–4	8–6	8–5	7–9	—	5–1

=== Round-Robin results ===
All draw times are listed in Eastern European Time (UTC+02:00).

==== Draw 1 ====
Thursday, December 14, 08:00

Sheet A	1	2	3	4	5	6	7	8	Final
Turkey (Eser) 🔨	0	3	1	0	2	0	3	X	9
Kazakhstan (Alliyar)	0	0	0	3	0	1	0	X	4

Sheet E	1	2	3	4	5	6	7	8	9	Final
United States (Wendling)	0	0	5	0	0	1	0	0	2	8
Hong Kong (Cheng) 🔨	0	2	0	1	1	0	1	1	0	6

Sheet B	1	2	3	4	5	6	7	8	Final
New Zealand (Flanagan) 🔨	2	0	0	1	0	1	1	0	5
Latvia (Reinis Buncis)	0	0	2	0	2	0	0	2	6

Sheet F	1	2	3	4	5	6	7	8	Final
England (Holcombe) 🔨	2	2	1	0	0	0	1	0	6
Brazil (Melo)	0	0	0	2	2	1	0	3	8

==== Draw 2 ====
Thursday, December 14, 12:00

Sheet A	1	2	3	4	5	6	7	8	Final
Canada (Tao) 🔨	0	1	0	1	0	0	1	0	3
Ukraine (Nikolov)	0	0	2	0	2	1	0	1	6

Sheet C	1	2	3	4	5	6	7	8	Final
Australia (Ryan) 🔨	4	1	0	3	0	0	4	X	12
Romania (Ghergie)	0	0	2	0	0	1	0	X	3

Sheet F	1	2	3	4	5	6	7	8	Final
South Korea (Kim) 🔨	1	0	0	1	0	0	0	2	4
Hungary (Tatár)	0	0	0	0	2	1	0	0	3

Sheet B	1	2	3	4	5	6	7	8	Final
Spain (Raubert) 🔨	1	4	2	0	3	5	X	X	15
Slovenia (Erjavec Bizjak)	0	0	0	1	0	0	X	X	1

Sheet D	1	2	3	4	5	6	7	8	Final
Sweden (Landelius) 🔨	1	0	1	0	2	0	0	1	5
Czech Republic (Chabičovský)	0	2	0	1	0	1	0	0	4

==== Draw 3 ====
Thursday, December 14, 16:00

Sheet A	1	2	3	4	5	6	7	8	Final
Denmark (Schmidt)	0	2	0	2	1	0	2	0	7
New Zealand (Flanagan) 🔨	1	0	1	0	0	2	0	4	8

Sheet C	1	2	3	4	5	6	7	8	Final
Kazakhstan (Alliyar) 🔨	0	0	0	0	1	0	0	X	1
Austria (Hofer)	0	0	0	2	0	0	2	X	4

Sheet F	1	2	3	4	5	6	7	8	9	Final
Brazil (Melo) 🔨	0	3	2	2	0	0	0	0	1	8
Hong Kong (Cheng)	1	0	0	0	1	1	2	2	0	7

Sheet B	1	2	3	4	5	6	7	8	Final
United States (Wendling) 🔨	0	5	3	0	2	0	X	X	10
England (Holcombe)	1	0	0	2	0	1	X	X	4

Sheet D	1	2	3	4	5	6	7	8	Final
Poland (Frynia) 🔨	0	0	0	0	1	0	1	X	2
Japan (Aoki)	2	2	1	4	0	1	0	X	10

==== Draw 4 ====
Thursday, December 14, 20:00

Sheet A	1	2	3	4	5	6	7	8	Final
Slovenia (Erjavec Bizjak) 🔨	0	0	0	2	1	0	0	X	3
Romania (Ghergie)	1	4	1	0	0	3	1	X	10

Sheet C	1	2	3	4	5	6	7	8	Final
Canada (Tao)	2	1	5	2	0	1	X	X	11
Turkey (Eser) 🔨	0	0	0	0	2	0	X	X	2

Sheet F	1	2	3	4	5	6	7	8	Final
Hungary (Tatár) 🔨	2	1	0	0	1	0	2	X	6
Czech Republic (Chabičovský)	0	0	1	1	0	1	0	X	3

Sheet B	1	2	3	4	5	6	7	8	Final
Sweden (Landelius) 🔨	0	1	2	0	1	0	0	1	5
South Korea (Kim)	0	0	0	3	0	0	1	0	4

Sheet E	1	2	3	4	5	6	7	8	Final
Spain (Raubert) 🔨	3	0	1	0	1	0	1	X	6
Australia (Ryan)	0	1	0	1	0	0	0	X	2

==== Draw 5 ====
Friday, December 15, 09:00

Sheet A	1	2	3	4	5	6	7	8	Final
Latvia (Reinis Buncis)	0	2	0	3	0	2	0	1	8
Hong Kong (Cheng) 🔨	1	0	1	0	2	0	1	0	5

Sheet C	1	2	3	4	5	6	7	8	Final
Poland (Frynia) 🔨	0	0	1	0	2	0	1	0	4
Kazakhstan (Alliyar)	1	1	0	1	0	1	0	1	5

Sheet F	1	2	3	4	5	6	7	8	9	Final
New Zealand (Flanagan)	3	0	0	0	1	0	3	0	2	9
United States (Wendling) 🔨	0	2	1	1	0	1	0	2	0	7

Sheet B	1	2	3	4	5	6	7	8	9	Final
Austria (Hofer)	0	0	1	0	0	0	4	1	0	6
Japan (Aoki) 🔨	2	1	0	1	0	2	0	0	1	7

Sheet D	1	2	3	4	5	6	7	8	Final
England (Holcombe)	0	0	1	0	0	0	X	X	1
Denmark (Schmidt) 🔨	2	0	0	4	3	2	X	X	11

==== Draw 6 ====
Friday, December 15, 14:00

Sheet A	1	2	3	4	5	6	7	8	Final
Australia (Ryan)	0	0	0	1	0	0	X	X	1
South Korea (Kim) 🔨	4	2	2	0	3	1	X	X	12

Sheet C	1	2	3	4	5	6	7	8	Final
Hungary (Tatár) 🔨	0	0	2	2	0	2	0	0	6
Sweden (Landelius)	1	2	0	0	1	0	1	2	7

Sheet F	1	2	3	4	5	6	7	8	Final
Spain (Raubert) 🔨	6	1	0	2	3	2	X	X	14
Romania (Ghergie)	0	0	1	0	0	0	X	X	1

Sheet B	1	2	3	4	5	6	7	8	Final
Turkey (Eser)	0	1	0	1	0	0	X	X	2
Ukraine (Nikolov) 🔨	1	0	4	0	2	3	X	X	10

Sheet E	1	2	3	4	5	6	7	8	Final
Slovenia (Erjavec Bizjak)	0	0	0	0	0	1	X	X	1
Czech Republic (Chabičovský) 🔨	6	4	4	2	3	0	X	X	19

==== Draw 7 ====
Friday, December 15, 19:00

Sheet A	1	2	3	4	5	6	7	8	Final
Kazakhstan (Alliyar)	0	0	0	0	1	0	1	X	2
Canada (Tao) 🔨	0	2	3	0	0	2	0	X	7

Sheet C	1	2	3	4	5	6	7	8	Final
Austria (Hofer)	0	1	0	0	1	0	2	0	4
Poland (Frynia) 🔨	1	0	1	1	0	2	0	1	6

Sheet E	1	2	3	4	5	6	7	8	Final
New Zealand (Flanagan) 🔨	2	1	0	3	2	2	X	X	10
England (Holcombe)	0	0	1	0	0	0	X	X	1

Sheet B	1	2	3	4	5	6	7	8	Final
Denmark (Schmidt)	3	0	4	0	3	0	X	X	10
Brazil (Melo) 🔨	0	1	0	1	0	1	X	X	3

Sheet D	1	2	3	4	5	6	7	8	Final
Latvia (Reinis Buncis)	0	2	1	0	1	0	1	0	5
United States (Wendling) 🔨	2	0	0	2	0	3	0	1	8

==== Draw 8 ====
Saturday, December 16, 08:00

Sheet A	1	2	3	4	5	6	7	8	Final
Czech Republic (Chabičovský) 🔨	1	3	0	1	1	1	X	X	7
Spain (Raubert)	0	0	1	0	0	0	X	X	1

Sheet C	1	2	3	4	5	6	7	8	Final
Romania (Ghergie)	0	0	0	0	0	0	X	X	0
South Korea (Kim) 🔨	6	2	2	1	1	5	X	X	17

Sheet E	1	2	3	4	5	6	7	8	Final
Japan (Aoki) 🔨	0	3	0	0	0	1	0	2	6
Canada (Tao)	0	0	0	0	1	0	2	0	3

Sheet B	1	2	3	4	5	6	7	8	Final
Hungary (Tatár)	0	3	0	4	2	0	X	X	9
Australia (Ryan) 🔨	1	0	1	0	0	2	X	X	4

Sheet D	1	2	3	4	5	6	7	8	Final
Ukraine (Nikolov)	0	3	1	0	1	1	0	3	9
Austria (Hofer) 🔨	1	0	0	4	0	0	0	0	5

Sheet F	1	2	3	4	5	6	7	8	Final
Slovenia (Erjavec Bizjak)	0	0	0	0	1	0	X	X	1
Sweden (Landelius) 🔨	4	6	4	4	0	4	X	X	22

==== Draw 9 ====
Saturday, December 16, 12:00

Sheet B	1	2	3	4	5	6	7	8	Final
Hong Kong (Cheng)	0	1	0	0	1	0	0	X	2
Denmark (Schmidt) 🔨	1	0	3	2	0	2	1	X	9

Sheet D	1	2	3	4	5	6	7	8	Final
Turkey (Eser) 🔨	1	0	1	0	2	0	0	2	6
Poland (Frynia)	0	0	0	1	0	0	4	0	5

Sheet C	1	2	3	4	5	6	7	8	Final
Brazil (Melo)	0	0	1	0	2	0	1	X	4
New Zealand (Flanagan) 🔨	3	2	0	3	0	2	0	X	10

Sheet E	1	2	3	4	5	6	7	8	Final
England (Holcombe) 🔨	0	0	0	0	1	0	X	X	1
Latvia (Reinis Buncis)	1	1	3	3	0	1	X	X	9

==== Draw 10 ====
Saturday, December 16, 16:00

Sheet B	1	2	3	4	5	6	7	8	Final
Australia (Ryan)	0	0	1	0	0	0	X	X	1
Czech Republic (Chabičovský) 🔨	0	4	0	0	1	4	X	X	9

Sheet D	1	2	3	4	5	6	7	8	Final
Romania (Ghergie)	0	0	0	0	0	0	X	X	0
Sweden (Landelius) 🔨	6	6	4	2	3	4	X	X	25

Sheet F	1	2	3	4	5	6	7	8	Final
Canada (Tao) 🔨	2	0	2	0	1	0	2	0	7
Austria (Hofer)	0	1	0	2	0	1	0	1	5

Sheet C	1	2	3	4	5	6	7	8	Final
Spain (Raubert)	0	0	0	1	2	0	X	X	3
Hungary (Tatár) 🔨	1	1	2	0	0	5	X	X	9

Sheet E	1	2	3	4	5	6	7	8	Final
South Korea (Kim) 🔨	4	3	1	0	1	0	1	X	10
Slovenia (Erjavec Bizjak)	0	0	0	1	0	0	0	X	1

==== Draw 11 ====
Saturday, December 16, 20:00

Sheet A	1	2	3	4	5	6	7	8	Final
Japan (Aoki) 🔨	0	2	4	0	2	0	0	X	8
Turkey (Eser)	0	0	0	2	0	2	1	X	5

Sheet D	1	2	3	4	5	6	7	8	Final
United States (Wendling) 🔨	1	4	4	0	1	0	0	X	10
Brazil (Melo)	0	0	0	3	0	2	0	X	5

Sheet F	1	2	3	4	5	6	7	8	Final
Latvia (Reinis Buncis)	0	0	0	1	0	1	X	X	2
Denmark (Schmidt) 🔨	2	2	1	0	4	0	X	X	9

Sheet C	1	2	3	4	5	6	7	8	9	Final
Hong Kong (Cheng) 🔨	1	0	2	1	0	0	1	0	4	9
England (Holcombe)	0	2	0	0	1	0	0	2	0	5

Sheet E	1	2	3	4	5	6	7	8	Final
Kazakhstan (Alliyar) 🔨	0	0	0	1	0	1	0	X	2
Ukraine (Nikolov)	1	2	0	0	1	0	2	X	6

==== Draw 12 ====
Sunday, December 17, 09:00

Sheet A	1	2	3	4	5	6	7	8	Final
Ukraine (Nikolov)	0	0	1	0	2	0	X	X	3
Japan (Aoki) 🔨	2	1	0	2	0	2	X	X	7

Sheet C	1	2	3	4	5	6	7	8	Final
Slovenia (Erjavec Bizjak)	0	0	0	1	0	1	0	X	2
Australia (Ryan) 🔨	3	4	2	0	3	0	2	X	14

Sheet E	1	2	3	4	5	6	7	8	Final
Sweden (Landelius) 🔨	2	0	3	0	2	0	3	X	10
Spain (Raubert)	0	2	0	1	0	1	0	X	4

Sheet B	1	2	3	4	5	6	7	8	Final
Romania (Ghergie)	0	0	0	0	1	0	X	X	1
Hungary (Tatár) 🔨	4	4	3	4	0	1	X	X	16

Sheet D	1	2	3	4	5	6	7	8	Final
Czech Republic (Chabičovský) 🔨	1	1	1	0	1	0	1	X	5
South Korea (Kim)	0	0	0	1	0	1	0	X	2

Sheet F	1	2	3	4	5	6	7	8	Final
Poland (Frynia) 🔨	0	1	0	1	0	0	0	X	2
Canada (Tao)	0	0	3	0	3	1	0	X	7

==== Draw 13 ====
Sunday, December 17, 14:00

Sheet A	1	2	3	4	5	6	7	8	Final
Brazil (Melo)	0	0	1	0	2	0	0	1	4
Latvia (Reinis Buncis) 🔨	0	1	0	1	0	1	2	0	5

Sheet D	1	2	3	4	5	6	7	8	Final
Hong Kong (Cheng) 🔨	1	0	2	0	0	1	0	0	4
New Zealand (Flanagan)	0	1	0	0	3	0	0	1	5

Sheet C	1	2	3	4	5	6	7	8	Final
Denmark (Schmidt) 🔨	0	1	0	1	0	1	0	0	3
United States (Wendling)	2	0	1	0	1	0	0	2	6

Sheet E	1	2	3	4	5	6	7	8	Final
Austria (Hofer) 🔨	2	2	0	4	1	0	2	X	11
Turkey (Eser)	0	0	2	0	0	3	0	X	5

==== Draw 14 ====
Sunday, December 17, 19:00

Sheet A	1	2	3	4	5	6	7	8	Final
Sweden (Landelius) 🔨	3	2	0	2	1	0	X	X	8
Australia (Ryan)	0	0	0	0	0	1	X	X	1

Sheet C	1	2	3	4	5	6	7	8	Final
South Korea (Kim) 🔨	0	2	0	2	1	1	0	X	6
Spain (Raubert)	0	0	1	0	0	0	1	X	2

Sheet E	1	2	3	4	5	6	7	8	Final
Ukraine (Nikolov)	0	2	0	1	3	0	2	X	8
Poland (Frynia) 🔨	0	0	1	0	0	2	0	X	3

Sheet B	1	2	3	4	5	6	7	8	Final
Czech Republic (Chabičovský) 🔨	5	1	2	5	2	0	X	X	15
Romania (Ghergie)	0	0	0	0	0	1	X	X	1

Sheet D	1	2	3	4	5	6	7	8	Final
Hungary (Tatár) 🔨	1	2	4	2	4	3	X	X	16
Slovenia (Erjavec Bizjak)	0	0	0	0	0	0	X	X	0

Sheet F	1	2	3	4	5	6	7	8	Final
Japan (Aoki) 🔨	3	0	5	0	1	0	X	X	9
Kazakhstan (Alliyar)	0	1	0	0	0	1	X	X	2

=== Playoffs ===
Quarterfinals
1	Japan	6
8	Denmark	7
4	Hungary	2
5	United States	7
3	New Zealand	7
6	Ukraine	5
2	Sweden	4
7	Canada	6

Semifinals
8	Denmark	2
5	United States	7
3	New Zealand	4
7	Canada	7

Gold medal game
5	United States	4
7	Canada	7
Third place
8	Denmark	7
3	New Zealand	5

==== Quarterfinals ====
Monday, December 18, 10:00

Sheet A	1	2	3	4	5	6	7	8	Final
Hungary (Tatár)	1	0	0	0	0	1	0	X	2
United States (Wendling) 🔨	0	1	2	2	1	0	1	X	7

Sheet B	1	2	3	4	5	6	7	8	Final
Japan (Aoki)	0	1	0	1	2	0	2	0	6
Denmark (Schmidt) 🔨	3	0	1	0	0	3	0	0	7

Sheet E	1	2	3	4	5	6	7	8	Final
Sweden (Landelius) 🔨	0	1	0	1	1	0	1	0	4
Canada (Tao)	1	0	2	0	0	1	0	2	6

Sheet F	1	2	3	4	5	6	7	8	Final
New Zealand (Flanagan)	0	0	4	0	1	1	0	1	7
Ukraine (Nikolov) 🔨	2	0	0	1	0	0	2	0	5

==== Semifinals ====
Monday, December 18, 17:00

Sheet B	1	2	3	4	5	6	7	8	Final
New Zealand (Flanagan) 🔨	0	1	0	0	1	0	2	X	4
Canada (Tao)	0	0	2	2	0	3	0	X	7

Sheet E	1	2	3	4	5	6	7	8	Final
Denmark (Schmidt)	0	1	0	0	0	1	X	X	2
United States (Wendling) 🔨	3	0	0	3	1	0	X	X	7

==== Bronze medal game ====
Tuesday, December 19, 10:00

Sheet C	1	2	3	4	5	6	7	8	Final
Denmark (Schmidt) 🔨	0	0	2	1	0	2	2	0	7
New Zealand (Flanagan)	1	1	0	0	2	0	0	1	5

==== Gold medal game ====
Tuesday, December 19, 10:00

Sheet D	1	2	3	4	5	6	7	8	Final
United States (Wendling)	0	1	0	1	0	1	1	0	4
Canada (Tao) 🔨	2	0	2	0	1	0	0	2	7

=== Final standings ===
Key
Teams Advance to the 2024 World Junior Curling Championships

Place	Team
1st place, gold medalist(s)	Canada
2nd place, silver medalist(s)	United States
3rd place, bronze medalist(s)	Denmark
4	New Zealand
5	Hungary
5	Japan
5	Sweden
5	Ukraine
9	South Korea
10	Austria
11	Czech Republic
12	Latvia
13	Brazil
14	Turkey
15	Spain
16	Hong Kong
17	Kazakhstan
18	Australia
19	Poland
20	England
21	Romania
22	Slovenia

== Women ==
=== Teams ===
The teams are listed as follows:

Australia	Austria	Belgium	Brazil	Canada
Skip: Holly Douglas; Third: Marcy Forge; Second: Molly Baker; Lead: Sienna Dunmore	Fourth: Teresa Treichl; Skip: Astrid Pflügler; Second: Emma Müller; Lead: Lisa Auer; Alternate: Hannah Wittibschlaeger	Skip: Mirte Michiels; Third: Frauke Michiels; Second: Mona Goubert; Lead: Tess Watzeels; Alternate: Ziva Watzeels	Skip: Gabriela Farias; Third: Isis Regadas; Second: Melissa Sampaio; Lead: Ana Teódoro	Skip: Myla Plett; Third: Alyssa Nedohin; Second: Chloe Fediuk; Lead: Allie Iskiw
China	Croatia	Czech Republic	Denmark	England
Skip: Li Ziru; Third: Zhang Jiaqi; Second: Zhang Yujie; Lead: Gao Ya; Alternate: Zhang Yuning	Skip: Luci Pavelka; Third: Paula Princip; Second: Jelena Bukvić; Lead: Ema Posavec; Alternate: Lucija Matani	Skip: Sofie Krupičková; Third: Emma Seifriedová; Second: Matylda Volfová; Lead: Veronika Vašáková; Alternate: Klára Baudyšová	Skip: Karolina Jensen; Third: Gabriella Qvist; Second: Natalie Wiksten; Lead: Katrine Schmidt; Alternate: Emilie Holtermann	Fourth: Lina Opel; Skip: Anna MacDougall; Second: Marianna Ward; Lead: Helena Kiggell; Alternate: Phoenix Davies
Germany	Hungary	Italy	Kazakhstan	Latvia
Fourth: Kim Sutor; Skip: Sara Messenzehl; Second: Zoé Antes; Lead: Joy Sutor; Alternate: Carolina Abdel Halim	Skip: Linda Joó; Third: Laura Nagy; Second: Laura Lauchsz; Lead: Hanna Orbán; Alternate: Dorina Dencso	Skip: Rebecca Mariani; Third: Giorgia Maurino; Second: Camilla Gilberti; Lead: Lucrezia Grande; Alternate: Rachele Scalesse	Skip: Yekterina Kolykhalova; Third: Tilsmay Alliyarova; Second: Merey Tastemir; Lead: Regina Ebauyer; Alternate: Yana Ebuayer	Skip: Evelīna Barone; Third: Rēzija Ieviņa; Second: Veronika Apse; Lead: Marija Seliverstova; Alternate: Letīcija Ieviņa
Netherlands	New Zealand	Poland	Romania	Slovakia
Skip: Lisenka Bomas; Third: Marit van Valkenhoef; Second: Anandi Bomas; Lead: Linde Nas	Skip: Rachael Pitts; Third: Ruby Kinney; Second: Olivia Russell; Lead: Lucy Neilson; Alternate: Tahlia Petersen	Fourth: Paulina Frysz; Skip: Magdalena Herman; Second: Julia Jawien; Lead: Malgorzata Frysz	Skip: Ambra Paslaru; Third: Ania Bacali; Second: Emma Ganea; Lead: Ariana Romaniuc; Alternate: Sorena Pop	Skip: Melánia Kováčiková; Third: Nina Summernova; Second: Paulina Hajduk; Lead: Zora Reilly
Slovenia	Spain	Turkey	Ukraine	United States
Fourth: Ema Kavčič; Third: Pavla Kavčič; Skip: Lana Zaveljcina; Lead: Nina Krapež	Fourth: Daniela García; Skip: Leyre Torralba; Second: Nerea Torralba; Lead: Leire Carasa; Alternate: Marisol Arias	Fourth: Berfin Şengül; Third: İclal Karaman; Second: İfayet Şafak Çalıkuşu; Skip: İlknur Ürüşan; Alternate: Melisa Cömert	Skip: Yaroslava Kalinichenko; Third: Diana Mosalenko; Second: Anastasiia Kotova; Lead: Marharyta Lytvynenko	Skip: Miranda Scheel; Third: Sara Olson; Second: Allory Johnson; Lead: Tessa Thurlow

=== Round Robin Standings ===
Final Round Robin Standings

Key
Teams to Playoffs

Group A	Skip	W	L	W–L	DSC
Canada	Myla Plett	6	0	–	72.27
Italy	Rebecca Mariani	5	1	–	102.79
Czech Republic	Sofie Krupičková	3	3	1–1	29.26
Netherlands	Lisenka Bomas	3	3	1–1	58.03
Spain	Leyre Torralba	3	3	1–1	75.28
Belgium	Mirte Michiels	1	5	–	73.57
Romania	Ambra Paslaru	0	6	–	164.20

Group B	Skip	W	L	W–L	DSC
Hungary	Linda Joó	5	0	–	72.38
Latvia	Evelīna Barone	4	1	–	107.92
Ukraine	Yaroslava Kalinichenko	3	2	–	101.40
New Zealand	Rachael Pitts	2	3	–	78.13
Slovakia	Melánia Kováčiková	1	4	–	79.10
England	Anna MacDougall	0	5	–	125.09

Group C	Skip	W	L	W–L	DSC
Germany	Sara Messenzehl	5	0	–	52.04
Denmark	Karolina Jensen	4	1	–	93.48
Austria	Astrid Pflügler	3	2	–	105.42
Kazakhstan	Yekaterina Kolyhalkova	2	3	–	48.28
Brazil	Gabriela Farias	1	4	–	142.43
Croatia	Luci Pavelka	0	5	–	136.00

Group D	Skip	W	L	W–L	DSC
Turkey	İlknur Ürüşan	5	0	–	65.79
China	Li Ziru	4	1	–	69.93
United States	Miranda Scheel	3	2	–	72.79
Poland	Magdalena Herman	2	3	–	107.23
Slovenia	Lana Zaveljcina	1	4	–	123.46
Australia	Holly Douglas	0	5	–	128.38

Group A Round Robin Summary Table
Pos.	Country	Belgium	Canada	Czech Republic	Italy	Netherlands	Romania	Spain	Record
6	Belgium	—	3–12	2–7	5–15	2–16	9–6	2–12	1–5
1	Canada	12–3	—	6–4	7–3	8–7	15–1	7–3	6–0
3	Czech Republic	7–2	4–6	—	3–8	6–5	16–1	3–8	3–3
2	Italy	15–5	3–7	8–3	—	7–4	14–0	10–3	5–1
4	Netherlands	16–2	7–8	5–6	4–7	—	15–1	5–2	3–3
7	Romania	6–9	1–15	1–16	0–14	1–15	—	0–18	0–6
5	Spain	12–2	3–7	8–3	3–10	2–5	18–0	—	3–3

Group B Round Robin Summary Table
Pos.	Country	England	Hungary	Latvia	New Zealand	Slovakia	Ukraine	Record
6	England	—	1–12	3–6	3–10	4–8	4–8	0–5
1	Hungary	12–1	—	6–3	9–4	12–0	10–8	5–0
2	Latvia	6–3	3–6	—	8–3	14–2	14–2	4–1
4	New Zealand	10–3	4–9	3–8	—	6–3	2–10	2–3
5	Slovakia	8–4	0–12	2–14	3–6	—	3–6	1–4
3	Ukraine	8–4	8–10	2–14	10–2	6–3	—	3–2

Group C Round Robin Summary Table
Pos.	Country	Austria	Brazil	Croatia	Denmark	Germany	Kazakhstan	Record
3	Austria	—	11–5	10–1	7–11	6–10	6–2	3–2
5	Brazil	5–11	—	8–4	4–8	2–10	6–9	1–4
6	Croatia	1–10	4–8	—	1–14	1–17	0–16	0–5
2	Denmark	11–7	8–4	14–1	—	3–9	7–4	4–1
1	Germany	10–6	10–2	17–1	9–3	—	7–1	5–0
4	Kazakhstan	2–6	9–6	16–0	4–7	1–7	—	2–3

Group D Round Robin Summary Table
Pos.	Country	Australia	China	Poland	Slovenia	Turkey	United States	Record
6	Australia	—	1–12	6–10	7–11	2–12	6–9	0–5
2	China	12–1	—	8–3	10–2	4–5	7–4	4–1
4	Poland	10–6	3–8	—	10–2	6–8	4–12	2–3
5	Slovenia	11–7	2–10	2–10	—	4–9	4–11	1–4
1	Turkey	12–2	5–4	8–6	9–4	—	7–6	5–0
3	United States	9–6	4–7	12–4	11–4	6–7	—	3–2

=== Round robin results ===
All draw times are listed in Eastern European Time (UTC+02:00).

==== Draw 1 ====
Friday, December 8, 8:00

Sheet A	1	2	3	4	5	6	7	8	Final
Canada (Plett)	3	0	6	4	1	1	X	X	15
Romania (Paslaru) 🔨	0	1	0	0	0	0	X	X	1

Sheet C	1	2	3	4	5	6	7	8	Final
Turkey (Ürüşan)	1	1	0	1	1	0	1	0	5
China (Li) 🔨	0	0	2	0	0	1	0	1	4

Sheet E	1	2	3	4	5	6	7	8	Final
Netherlands (Bomas) 🔨	2	0	0	2	0	0	0	X	4
Italy (Mariani)	0	1	1	0	0	2	3	X	7

Sheet B	1	2	3	4	5	6	7	8	Final
Australia (Douglas) 🔨	0	1	0	5	0	0	1	0	7
Slovenia (Zaveljcina)	2	0	2	0	2	4	0	1	11

Sheet D	1	2	3	4	5	6	7	8	Final
United States (Scheel) 🔨	3	0	2	0	3	4	0	X	12
Poland (Herman)	0	1	0	2	0	0	1	X	4

Sheet F	1	2	3	4	5	6	7	8	Final
Spain (Torralba) 🔨	0	2	2	2	1	5	0	X	12
Belgium (Michiels)	1	0	0	0	0	0	1	X	2

==== Draw 2 ====
Friday, December 8, 12:00

Sheet A	1	2	3	4	5	6	7	8	Final
Ukraine (Kalinichenko) 🔨	0	2	0	1	1	0	2	2	8
England (MacDougall)	1	0	2	0	0	1	0	0	4

Sheet C	1	2	3	4	5	6	7	8	Final
New Zealand (Pitts)	1	0	0	0	2	1	0	X	4
Hungary (Joó) 🔨	0	2	2	3	0	0	2	X	9

Sheet E	1	2	3	4	5	6	7	8	Final
Brazil (Farias)	0	1	0	0	1	0	2	X	4
Denmark (Jensen) 🔨	1	0	2	2	0	3	0	X	8

Sheet B	1	2	3	4	5	6	7	8	Final
Latvia (Barone) 🔨	3	3	3	1	0	4	0	X	14
Slovakia (Kováčiková)	0	0	0	0	1	0	1	X	2

Sheet D	1	2	3	4	5	6	7	8	Final
Austria (Pflügler)	1	1	0	0	2	1	1	X	6
Kazakhstan (Kolyhalkova) 🔨	0	0	0	2	0	0	0	X	2

Sheet F	1	2	3	4	5	6	7	8	Final
Germany (Messenzehl) 🔨	4	5	1	1	0	6	X	X	17
Croatia (Pavelka)	0	0	0	0	1	0	X	X	1

==== Draw 3 ====
Friday, December 8, 16:00

Sheet A	1	2	3	4	5	6	7	8	Final
Turkey (Ürüşan) 🔨	5	1	0	3	0	3	X	X	12
Australia (Douglas)	0	0	1	0	1	0	X	X	2

Sheet C	1	2	3	4	5	6	7	8	Final
Slovenia (Zaveljcina)	0	0	2	1	0	1	X	X	4
United States (Scheel) 🔨	2	5	0	0	4	0	X	X	11

Sheet E	1	2	3	4	5	6	7	8	Final
Belgium (Michiels) 🔨	1	0	0	0	0	1	0	X	2
Czech Republic (Krupičková)	0	1	1	1	1	0	3	X	7

Sheet B	1	2	3	4	5	6	7	8	Final
Canada (Plett)	0	1	0	0	1	2	3	X	7
Spain (Torralba) 🔨	1	0	1	1	0	0	0	X	3

Sheet D	1	2	3	4	5	6	7	8	Final
Romania (Paslaru)	0	0	0	0	0	0	X	X	0
Italy (Mariani) 🔨	3	3	1	3	2	2	X	X	14

Sheet F	1	2	3	4	5	6	7	8	Final
China (Li) 🔨	0	3	0	1	2	2	0	X	8
Poland (Herman)	1	0	1	0	0	0	1	X	3

==== Draw 4 ====
Friday, December 8, 20:00

Sheet A	1	2	3	4	5	6	7	8	Final
Slovakia (Kováčiková) 🔨	0	0	0	0	0	0	X	X	0
Hungary (Joó)	1	4	1	2	2	2	X	X	12

Sheet C	1	2	3	4	5	6	7	8	Final
Croatia (Pavelka)	0	0	0	0	0	0	X	X	0
Kazakhstan (Kolyhalkova) 🔨	4	1	4	3	3	1	X	X	16

Sheet E	1	2	3	4	5	6	7	8	Final
Latvia (Barone) 🔨	0	5	0	5	3	1	X	X	14
Ukraine (Kalinichenko)	1	0	1	0	0	0	X	X	2

Sheet B	1	2	3	4	5	6	7	8	Final
Denmark (Jensen)	0	4	0	2	1	3	0	1	11
Austria (Pflügler) 🔨	3	0	2	0	0	0	2	0	7

Sheet D	1	2	3	4	5	6	7	8	Final
Brazil (Farias)	0	0	1	0	0	1	X	X	2
Germany (Messenzehl) 🔨	3	5	0	1	1	0	X	X	10

Sheet F	1	2	3	4	5	6	7	8	Final
England (MacDougall) 🔨	0	0	1	1	0	0	1	X	3
New Zealand (Pitts)	3	1	0	0	4	2	0	X	10

==== Draw 5 ====
Saturday, December 9, 9:00

Sheet A	1	2	3	4	5	6	7	8	Final
Spain (Torralba)	0	0	2	0	1	0	X	X	3
Italy (Mariani) 🔨	4	1	0	1	0	4	X	X	10

Sheet C	1	2	3	4	5	6	7	8	Final
Poland (Herman)	2	1	0	0	2	5	0	X	10
Australia (Douglas) 🔨	0	0	2	1	0	0	3	X	6

Sheet E	1	2	3	4	5	6	7	8	Final
Turkey (Ürüşan)	0	0	2	0	1	5	1	X	9
Slovenia (Zaveljcina) 🔨	1	1	0	2	0	0	0	X	4

Sheet B	1	2	3	4	5	6	7	8	Final
China (Li) 🔨	2	1	0	0	1	0	1	2	7
United States (Scheel)	0	0	1	1	0	2	0	0	4

Sheet D	1	2	3	4	5	6	7	8	Final
Belgium (Michiels)	0	0	1	0	1	0	X	X	2
Netherlands (Bomas) 🔨	6	4	0	4	0	2	X	X	16

Sheet F	1	2	3	4	5	6	7	8	Final
Romania (Paslaru)	0	1	0	0	0	0	0	X	1
Czech Republic (Krupičková) 🔨	5	0	1	1	0	3	6	X	16

==== Draw 6 ====
Saturday, December 9, 14:00

Sheet A	1	2	3	4	5	6	7	8	Final
Austria (Pflügler) 🔨	1	0	2	2	3	2	X	X	10
Croatia (Pavelka)	0	1	0	0	0	0	X	X	1

Sheet C	1	2	3	4	5	6	7	8	Final
Denmark (Jensen)	0	0	0	0	2	1	0	X	3
Germany (Messenzehl) 🔨	2	2	2	1	0	0	2	X	9

Sheet E	1	2	3	4	5	6	7	8	Final
Slovakia (Kováčiková)	1	1	0	1	0	0	0	X	3
New Zealand (Pitts) 🔨	0	0	1	0	2	2	1	X	6

Sheet B	1	2	3	4	5	6	7	8	Final
Hungary (Joó) 🔨	1	0	2	0	0	2	2	3	10
Ukraine (Kalinichenko)	0	5	0	2	1	0	0	0	8

Sheet D	1	2	3	4	5	6	7	8	Final
England (MacDougall)	0	0	1	0	1	0	1	X	3
Latvia (Barone) 🔨	1	3	0	0	0	2	0	X	6

Sheet F	1	2	3	4	5	6	7	8	Final
Kazakhstan (Kolyhalkova) 🔨	2	0	3	3	0	0	0	1	9
Brazil (Farias)	0	1	0	0	1	3	1	0	6

==== Draw 7 ====
Saturday, December 9, 19:00

Sheet A	1	2	3	4	5	6	7	8	9	Final
Czech Republic (Krupičková) 🔨	1	0	2	1	0	0	1	0	1	6
Netherlands (Bomas)	0	1	0	0	0	1	0	3	0	5

Sheet C	1	2	3	4	5	6	7	8	Final
Belgium (Michiels)	1	0	0	5	1	0	0	2	9
Romania (Paslaru) 🔨	0	1	1	0	0	2	2	0	6

Sheet E	1	2	3	4	5	6	7	8	Final
United States (Scheel)	2	0	0	4	0	1	0	2	9
Australia (Douglas) 🔨	0	3	1	0	1	0	1	0	6

Sheet B	1	2	3	4	5	6	7	8	Final
Poland (Herman) 🔨	0	1	1	0	1	2	1	0	6
Turkey (Ürüşan)	4	0	0	3	0	0	0	1	8

Sheet D	1	2	3	4	5	6	7	8	Final
Slovenia (Zaveljcina)	0	0	0	1	0	1	X	X	2
China (Li) 🔨	1	6	1	0	2	0	X	X	10

Sheet F	1	2	3	4	5	6	7	8	Final
Italy (Mariani)	0	0	1	0	1	1	0	X	3
Canada (Plett) 🔨	2	0	0	3	0	0	2	X	7

==== Draw 8 ====
Sunday, December 10, 8:00

Sheet A	1	2	3	4	5	6	7	8	Final
Kazakhstan (Kolyhalkova) 🔨	1	0	1	0	0	1	1	0	4
Denmark (Jensen)	0	2	0	2	0	0	0	3	7

Sheet C	1	2	3	4	5	6	7	8	Final
Slovakia (Kováčiková)	0	0	0	2	0	2	2	2	8
England (MacDougall) 🔨	1	1	1	0	1	0	0	0	4

Sheet E	1	2	3	4	5	6	7	8	9	Final
Austria (Pflügler)	2	0	0	0	1	0	1	2	0	6
Germany (Messenzehl) 🔨	0	2	1	2	0	1	0	0	4	10

Sheet B	1	2	3	4	5	6	7	8	Final
Croatia (Pavelka)	2	0	0	0	0	1	1	0	4
Brazil (Farias) 🔨	0	1	2	1	1	0	0	3	8

Sheet D	1	2	3	4	5	6	7	8	Final
Ukraine (Kalinichenko) 🔨	0	3	4	0	1	1	1	X	10
New Zealand (Pitts)	1	0	0	1	0	0	0	X	2

Sheet F	1	2	3	4	5	6	7	8	Final
Hungary (Joó) 🔨	1	0	1	1	0	0	1	2	6
Latvia (Barone)	0	2	0	0	1	0	0	0	3

==== Draw 9 ====
Sunday, December 10, 12:00

Sheet C	1	2	3	4	5	6	7	8	Final
Italy (Mariani)	2	1	0	5	0	0	X	X	8
Czech Republic (Krupičková) 🔨	0	0	1	0	1	1	X	X	3

Sheet E	1	2	3	4	5	6	7	8	Final
Spain (Torralba) 🔨	2	2	3	5	1	5	X	X	18
Romania (Paslaru)	0	0	0	0	0	0	X	X	0

Sheet D	1	2	3	4	5	6	7	8	9	Final
Netherlands (Bomas)	0	0	0	0	2	1	2	2	0	7
Canada (Plett) 🔨	0	0	3	4	0	0	0	0	1	8

==== Draw 10 ====
Sunday, December 10, 16:00

Sheet A	1	2	3	4	5	6	7	8	Final
New Zealand (Pitts) 🔨	0	0	2	0	1	0	0	X	3
Latvia (Barone)	1	1	0	3	0	2	1	X	8

Sheet C	1	2	3	4	5	6	7	8	Final
Brazil (Farias)	0	0	2	2	0	1	0	X	5
Austria (Pflügler) 🔨	2	2	0	0	4	0	3	X	11

Sheet E	1	2	3	4	5	6	7	8	Final
England (MacDougall)	0	0	0	0	1	0	0	X	1
Hungary (Joó) 🔨	2	4	1	3	0	1	1	X	12

Sheet B	1	2	3	4	5	6	7	8	Final
Germany (Messenzehl) 🔨	1	1	1	2	1	0	1	X	7
Kazakhstan (Kolyhalkova)	0	0	0	0	0	1	0	X	1

Sheet D	1	2	3	4	5	6	7	8	Final
Denmark (Jensen)	4	3	1	1	0	5	X	X	14
Croatia (Pavelka) 🔨	0	0	0	0	1	0	X	X	1

Sheet F	1	2	3	4	5	6	7	8	Final
Ukraine (Kalinichenko) 🔨	1	0	0	1	1	0	3	X	6
Slovakia (Kováčiková)	0	1	1	0	0	1	0	X	3

==== Draw 11 ====
Sunday, December 10, 20:00

Sheet A	1	2	3	4	5	6	7	8	Final
Poland (Herman) 🔨	2	3	0	1	0	4	X	X	10
Slovenia (Zaveljcina)	0	0	1	0	1	0	X	X	2

Sheet C	1	2	3	4	5	6	7	8	Final
Canada (Plett) 🔨	3	0	4	0	0	4	1	X	12
Belgium (Michiels)	0	1	0	1	1	0	0	X	3

Sheet E	1	2	3	4	5	6	7	8	Final
Australia (Douglas) 🔨	1	0	0	0	0	0	X	X	1
China (Li)	0	3	4	3	1	1	X	X	12

Sheet B	1	2	3	4	5	6	7	8	Final
Romania (Paslaru)	0	0	0	0	0	1	X	X	1
Netherlands (Bomas) 🔨	2	3	3	4	3	0	X	X	15

Sheet D	1	2	3	4	5	6	7	8	Final
Czech Republic (Krupičková) 🔨	0	0	1	0	1	0	1	X	3
Spain (Torralba)	2	1	0	2	0	3	0	X	8

Sheet F	1	2	3	4	5	6	7	8	Final
United States (Scheel)	1	0	0	0	1	0	4	0	6
Turkey (Ürüşan) 🔨	0	1	2	1	0	1	0	2	7

==== Draw 12 ====
Monday, December 11, 10:00

Sheet B	1	2	3	4	5	6	7	8	Final
Italy (Mariani) 🔨	2	2	0	3	0	5	3	X	15
Belgium (Michiels)	0	0	3	0	2	0	0	X	5

Sheet E	1	2	3	4	5	6	7	8	Final
Czech Republic (Krupičková) 🔨	2	0	0	0	1	0	0	1	4
Canada (Plett)	0	2	0	1	0	1	2	0	6

Sheet C	1	2	3	4	5	6	7	8	Final
Netherlands (Bomas)	0	0	0	1	0	1	2	1	5
Spain (Torralba) 🔨	0	0	1	0	1	0	0	0	2

=== Playoffs ===
Quarterfinals
1	Germany	8
8	Latvia	2
4	Hungary	3
5	China	5
3	Canada	8
6	Denmark	5
2	Turkey	6
7	Italy	4

Semifinals
1	Germany	5
5	China	7
3	Canada	9
2	Turkey	4

Gold medal game
5	China	6
3	Canada	3
Third place
1	Germany	7
2	Turkey	5

==== Quarterfinals ====
Monday, December 11, 19:00

Sheet A	1	2	3	4	5	6	7	8	Final
Hungary (Joó)	0	1	0	1	0	0	1	0	3
China (Li) 🔨	0	0	2	0	0	1	0	2	5

Sheet B	1	2	3	4	5	6	7	8	Final
Germany (Messenzehl)	0	0	2	0	2	2	2	X	8
Latvia (Barone) 🔨	0	1	0	1	0	0	0	X	2

Sheet E	1	2	3	4	5	6	7	8	Final
Turkey (Ürüşan) 🔨	1	1	0	0	2	0	0	2	6
Italy (Mariani)	0	0	0	2	0	1	1	0	4

Sheet F	1	2	3	4	5	6	7	8	9	Final
Canada (Plett)	0	2	1	0	1	0	1	0	3	8
Denmark (Jensen) 🔨	1	0	0	1	0	1	0	2	0	5

==== Semifinals ====
Tuesday, December 12, 10:00

Sheet B	1	2	3	4	5	6	7	8	Final
Canada (Plett)	0	2	0	3	0	3	1	X	9
Turkey (Ürüşan) 🔨	1	0	1	0	2	0	0	X	4

Sheet E	1	2	3	4	5	6	7	8	Final
Germany (Messenzehl) 🔨	0	1	0	1	1	0	2	0	5
China (Li)	0	0	1	0	0	3	0	3	7

==== Bronze medal game ====
Tuesday, December 12, 19:00

Sheet C	1	2	3	4	5	6	7	8	Final
Germany (Messenzehl) 🔨	1	0	3	0	2	1	0	X	7
Turkey (Ürüşan)	0	2	0	1	0	0	2	X	5

==== Gold medal game ====
Tuesday, December 12, 19:00

Sheet D	1	2	3	4	5	6	7	8	Final
China (Li)	0	3	0	1	1	1	0	X	6
Canada (Plett) 🔨	1	0	1	0	0	0	1	X	3

=== Final standings ===
Key
Teams Advance to the 2024 World Junior Curling Championships

Place	Team
1st place, gold medalist(s)	China
2nd place, silver medalist(s)	Canada
3rd place, bronze medalist(s)	Germany
4	Turkey
5	Denmark
5	Hungary
5	Italy
5	Latvia
9	Czech Republic
10	United States
11	Ukraine
12	Austria
13	Kazakhstan
14	Netherlands
15	New Zealand
16	Poland
17	Spain
18	Slovakia
19	Slovenia
20	Brazil
21	Belgium
22	England
23	Australia
24	Croatia
25	Romania
