= 2024 World Junior Curling Championships =

Curling tournament in Finland

- Host city: Lohja, Finland
- Arena: Kisakallio Sports Institute
- Dates: February 17–24
- Men's winner: Norway
- Curling club: Lillehammer CK, Lillehammer
- Skip: Lukas Høstmælingen
- Third: Tinius Haslev Nordbye
- Second: Magnus Lillebø
- Lead: Eskil Eriksen
- Alternate: Harald Dæhlin
- Coach: Johan Høstmælingen
- Finalist: Italy (Gilli)
- Women's winner: Switzerland
- Curling club: GC Zurich, Zurich
- Skip: Xenia Schwaller
- Third: Selina Gafner
- Second: Fabienne Rieder
- Lead: Selina Rychiger
- Alternate: Zoe Schwaller
- Coach: Andreas Schwaller
- Finalist: Japan (Tabata)

The 2024 World Junior Curling Championships were held from February 17 to 24 at the Kisakallio Sports Institute in Lohja, Finland.

== Medallists ==
Junior	Gold	Silver	Bronze
Men	Norway; Lukas Høstmælingen; Tinius Haslev Nordbye; Magnus Lillebø; Eskil Eriksen; Harald Dæhlin	Italy; Francesco De Zanna (Fourth); Stefano Gilli (Skip); Andrea Gilli; Francesco Vigilani; Alberto Cavallero	Denmark; Jonathan Vilandt (Fourth); Jacob Schmidt (Skip); Alexander Qvist; Kasper Jurlander Bøge; Nikki Jensen
Women	Switzerland; Xenia Schwaller; Selina Gafner; Fabienne Rieder; Selina Rychiger; Zoe Schwaller	Japan; Momoha Tabata; Miku Nihira; Yuina Miura; Mikoto Nakajima; Yui Ueno	Norway; Torild Bjørnstad; Nora Østgård; Ingeborg Forbregd; Eilin Kjærland

== Men ==
=== Qualification ===
The following nations qualified to participate in the 2024 World Junior Curling Championship:

Event	Vacancies	Qualified
Host Nation	~~1~~ 0	~~Finland~~
2023 World Junior Curling Championships	6	China; Germany; Scotland; Norway; Italy; Switzerland
2023 World Junior-B Curling Championships	~~3~~ 4	Canada; United States; Denmark; New Zealand
TOTAL	10	

=== Teams ===
The teams are listed as follows:

Canada	China	Denmark	Germany	Italy
Skip: Johnson Tao; Third: Jaedon Neuert; Second: Zachary Davies; Lead: Adam Naugler	Skip: Tao Liqiunan; Third: Xu Xin; Second: He Bowen; Lead: Shi Guixi; Alternate: Liu Chen Wen Jie	Fourth: Jonathan Vilandt; Skip: Jacob Schmidt; Second: Alexander Qvist; Lead: Kasper Jurlander Bøge; Alternate: Nikki Jensen	Skip: Benjamin Kapp; Third: Felix Messenzehl; Second: Johannes Scheuerl; Lead: Mario Trevisiol; Alternate: Adrian Enders	Fourth: Francesco De Zanna; Skip: Stefano Gilli; Second: Andrea Gilli; Lead: Francesco Vigilani; Alternate: Alberto Cavallero
New Zealand	Norway	Scotland	Switzerland	United States
Fourth: William Becker; Skip: Sam Flanagan; Second: Darcy Nevill; Lead: Jed Nevill	Skip: Lukas Høstmælingen; Third: Tinius Haslev Nordbye; Second: Magnus Lillebø; Lead: Eskil Eriksen; Alternate: Harald Dæhlin	Skip: Orrin Carson; Third: Logan Carson; Second: Archie Hyslop; Lead: Charlie Gibb; Alternate: Hamish Gallacher	Skip: Manuel Jermann; Third: Yannick Jermann; Second: Kenjo von Allmen; Lead: Simon Hanhart; Alternate: Kim Schwaller	Skip: Wesley Wendling; Third: Jackson Bestland; Second: Kevin Tuma; Lead: Jackson Armstrong; Alternate: Caden Hebert

=== Round robin standings ===
Final Round Robin Standings

Key
Teams to Playoffs
Teams relegated to 2024 B Championship

Country	Skip	W	L	W–L	PF	PA	EW	EL	BE	SE	DSC
Norway	Lukas Høstmælingen	7	2	2–0	64	40	40	30	12	13	33.72
Italy	Stefano Gilli	7	2	1–1	65	45	38	31	5	12	46.87
Denmark	Jacob Schmidt	7	2	0–2	70	53	43	38	5	13	53.99
United States	Wesley Wendling	6	3	–	69	63	38	37	5	9	26.14
Germany	Benjamin Kapp	5	4	1–0	64	49	35	32	9	9	29.14
Scotland	Orrin Carson	5	4	0–1	66	53	39	32	4	11	34.28
Canada	Johnson Tao	4	5	–	57	59	37	41	2	8	44.86
Switzerland	Manuel Jermann	2	7	1–0	53	67	35	34	3	8	59.52
China	Tao Liqiunan	2	7	0–1	38	57	28	38	11	7	48.46
New Zealand	Sam Flanagan	0	9	–	25	81	19	40	5	1	66.84

Round robin summary table
Pos.	Country	Canada	China	Denmark	Germany	Italy	New Zealand	Norway	Scotland	Switzerland	United States	Record
7	Canada	—	6–3	6–7	8–7	3–8	9–3	4–8	4–9	8–4	9–10	4–5
9	China	3–6	—	2–6	4–7	1–9	10–3	3–9	4–6	5–7	6–4	2–6
3	Denmark	7–6	6–2	—	10–9	7–8	8–4	3–6	9–7	9–8	11–3	7–2
5	Germany	7–8	7–4	9–10	—	9–2	9–1	7–8	7–5	6–4	3–7	5–4
2	Italy	8–3	9–1	8–7	2–9	—	8–3	4–5	10–6	6–5	10–6	7–2
10	New Zealand	3–9	3–10	4–8	1–9	3–8	—	2–7	2–9	4–11	3–10	0–9
1	Norway	8–4	9–3	6–3	8–7	5–4	7–2	—	5–7	7–4	7–8	7–2
6	Scotland	9–4	6–4	7–9	5–7	6–10	9–2	7–5	—	11–2	6–10	5–4
8	Switzerland	4–8	7–5	8–9	4–6	5–6	11–4	4–7	2–11	—	8–11	2–7
4	United States	10–9	4–6	3–11	7–3	6–10	10–3	8–7	10–6	11–8	—	6–3

=== Round robin results ===
All draw times are listed in Eastern European Time (UTC+02:00).

==== Draw 1 ====
Saturday, February 17, 14:00

Sheet A	1	2	3	4	5	6	7	8	9	10	Final
Canada (J. Tao)	0	0	0	1	0	0	1	2	0	X	4
Scotland (Carson) 🔨	2	2	1	0	1	1	0	0	2	X	9

Sheet B	1	2	3	4	5	6	7	8	9	10	11	Final
Germany (Kapp) 🔨	2	0	0	2	0	0	0	0	1	2	0	7
Norway (Høstmælingen)	0	0	2	0	1	2	1	1	0	0	1	8

Sheet C	1	2	3	4	5	6	7	8	9	10	Final
Denmark (Schmidt) 🔨	0	1	0	0	0	2	0	2	1	X	6
China (Tao L.)	1	0	0	0	1	0	0	0	0	X	2

Sheet D	1	2	3	4	5	6	7	8	9	10	Final
United States (Wendling) 🔨	2	0	0	2	0	2	0	0	0	X	6
Italy (Gilli)	0	3	1	0	1	0	1	2	2	X	10

Sheet E	1	2	3	4	5	6	7	8	9	10	Final
New Zealand (Flanagan) 🔨	2	0	0	2	0	0	0	0	0	X	4
Switzerland (Jermann)	0	2	1	0	1	2	3	1	1	X	11

==== Draw 2 ====
Sunday, February 18, 9:00

Sheet A	1	2	3	4	5	6	7	8	9	10	Final
Norway (Høstmælingen)	0	2	0	0	0	2	0	1	2	0	7
United States (Wendling) 🔨	2	0	2	0	1	0	2	0	0	1	8

Sheet B	1	2	3	4	5	6	7	8	9	10	Final
Scotland (Carson)	0	0	1	0	3	0	2	0	0	X	6
Italy (Gilli) 🔨	1	0	0	3	0	3	0	2	1	X	10

Sheet C	1	2	3	4	5	6	7	8	9	10	Final
New Zealand (Flanagan) 🔨	1	0	1	0	0	0	0	1	0	X	3
Canada (J. Tao)	0	1	0	1	2	2	2	0	1	X	9

Sheet D	1	2	3	4	5	6	7	8	9	10	Final
Switzerland (Jermann)	1	0	0	1	0	0	2	0	0	3	7
China (Tao L.) 🔨	0	0	3	0	0	1	0	1	0	0	5

Sheet E	1	2	3	4	5	6	7	8	9	10	11	Final
Germany (Kapp) 🔨	0	1	2	0	2	0	2	0	2	0	0	9
Denmark (Schmidt)	0	0	0	2	0	2	0	3	0	2	1	10

==== Draw 3 ====
Sunday, February 18, 19:00

Sheet A	1	2	3	4	5	6	7	8	9	10	Final
China (Tao L.) 🔨	0	1	0	1	0	0	0	2	0	X	4
Germany (Kapp)	2	0	1	0	0	0	2	0	2	X	7

Sheet B	1	2	3	4	5	6	7	8	9	10	Final
Canada (J. Tao) 🔨	2	0	0	0	1	0	2	3	0	X	8
Switzerland (Jermann)	0	1	1	0	0	1	0	0	1	X	4

Sheet C	1	2	3	4	5	6	7	8	9	10	Final
Scotland (Carson)	1	0	2	0	2	0	1	0	0	X	6
United States (Wendling) 🔨	0	4	0	2	0	1	0	2	1	X	10

Sheet D	1	2	3	4	5	6	7	8	9	10	Final
Denmark (Schmidt)	0	0	0	3	1	2	0	2	0	X	8
New Zealand (Flanagan) 🔨	0	1	0	0	0	0	2	0	1	X	4

Sheet E	1	2	3	4	5	6	7	8	9	10	Final
Norway (Høstmælingen) 🔨	1	0	0	1	1	0	0	1	0	1	5
Italy (Gilli)	0	1	0	0	0	2	0	0	1	0	4

==== Draw 4 ====
Monday, February 19, 14:00

Sheet A	1	2	3	4	5	6	7	8	9	10	Final
Italy (Gilli) 🔨	0	1	1	0	4	0	2	0	X	X	8
New Zealand (Flanagan)	0	0	0	1	0	1	0	1	X	X	3

Sheet B	1	2	3	4	5	6	7	8	9	10	Final
Denmark (Schmidt) 🔨	0	1	0	3	1	0	0	3	3	X	11
United States (Wendling)	0	0	1	0	0	1	1	0	0	X	3

Sheet C	1	2	3	4	5	6	7	8	9	10	Final
Switzerland (Jermann)	0	0	0	1	0	0	1	0	2	X	4
Norway (Høstmælingen) 🔨	0	0	3	0	2	1	0	1	0	X	7

Sheet D	1	2	3	4	5	6	7	8	9	10	Final
China (Tao L.)	0	0	0	1	1	0	0	1	0	0	3
Canada (J. Tao) 🔨	1	0	0	0	0	2	1	0	0	2	6

Sheet E	1	2	3	4	5	6	7	8	9	10	Final
Scotland (Carson)	1	0	0	2	0	2	0	0	0	0	5
Germany (Kapp) 🔨	0	3	1	0	2	0	0	0	0	1	7

==== Draw 5 ====
Tuesday, February 20, 9:00

Sheet A	1	2	3	4	5	6	7	8	9	10	Final
Denmark (Schmidt)	0	0	1	0	1	0	1	0	0	0	3
Norway (Høstmælingen) 🔨	0	1	0	1	0	2	0	1	0	1	6

Sheet B	1	2	3	4	5	6	7	8	9	10	Final
New Zealand (Flanagan) 🔨	1	0	0	1	0	0	1	0	0	X	3
Scotland (Carson)	0	0	2	0	1	1	0	3	1	X	9

Sheet C	1	2	3	4	5	6	7	8	9	10	Final
Canada (J. Tao)	0	0	1	0	0	1	0	1	X	X	3
Italy (Gilli) 🔨	1	1	0	1	4	0	1	0	X	X	8

Sheet D	1	2	3	4	5	6	7	8	9	10	Final
Germany (Kapp)	0	0	0	2	0	0	2	0	2	X	6
Switzerland (Jermann) 🔨	0	2	0	0	0	1	0	1	0	X	4

Sheet E	1	2	3	4	5	6	7	8	9	10	11	Final
United States (Wendling) 🔨	0	0	0	1	0	0	0	1	0	2	0	4
China (Tao L.)	0	0	1	0	2	0	1	0	0	0	2	6

==== Draw 6 ====
Tuesday, February 20, 19:00

Sheet A	1	2	3	4	5	6	7	8	9	10	Final
New Zealand (Flanagan)	0	1	0	0	0	2	0	0	X	X	3
China (Tao L.) 🔨	2	0	0	2	4	0	1	1	X	X	10

Sheet B	1	2	3	4	5	6	7	8	9	10	Final
Norway (Høstmælingen) 🔨	0	2	1	0	0	2	0	3	0	X	8
Canada (J. Tao)	0	0	0	1	0	0	2	0	1	X	4

Sheet C	1	2	3	4	5	6	7	8	9	10	Final
United States (Wendling)	0	0	3	0	2	1	1	0	X	X	7
Germany (Kapp) 🔨	2	0	0	0	0	0	0	1	X	X	3

Sheet D	1	2	3	4	5	6	7	8	9	10	Final
Italy (Gilli) 🔨	2	1	0	0	0	2	0	1	0	2	8
Denmark (Schmidt)	0	0	2	2	1	0	1	0	1	0	7

Sheet E	1	2	3	4	5	6	7	8	9	10	Final
Switzerland (Jermann)	0	1	0	1	0	0	X	X	X	X	2
Scotland (Carson) 🔨	3	0	3	0	2	3	X	X	X	X	11

==== Draw 7 ====
Wednesday, February 21, 14:00

Sheet A	1	2	3	4	5	6	7	8	9	10	Final
Germany (Kapp) 🔨	3	0	2	2	0	2	X	X	X	X	9
Italy (Gilli)	0	1	0	0	1	0	X	X	X	X	2

Sheet B	1	2	3	4	5	6	7	8	9	10	Final
China (Tao L.)	0	0	2	0	0	1	0	1	0	X	4
Scotland (Carson) 🔨	0	2	0	0	0	0	2	0	2	X	6

Sheet C	1	2	3	4	5	6	7	8	9	10	Final
Switzerland (Jermann) 🔨	1	0	0	2	0	2	0	0	3	0	8
Denmark (Schmidt)	0	1	1	0	2	0	0	3	0	2	9

Sheet D	1	2	3	4	5	6	7	8	9	10	Final
New Zealand (Flanagan) 🔨	0	0	0	0	1	0	0	1	X	X	2
Norway (Høstmælingen)	2	1	2	0	0	1	1	0	X	X	7

Sheet E	1	2	3	4	5	6	7	8	9	10	11	Final
Canada (J. Tao) 🔨	3	0	2	0	0	1	0	1	0	2	0	9
United States (Wendling)	0	3	0	0	1	0	3	0	2	0	1	10

==== Draw 8 ====
Thursday, February 22, 9:00

Sheet A	1	2	3	4	5	6	7	8	9	10	Final
Scotland (Carson) 🔨	1	0	2	0	1	0	1	0	2	0	7
Denmark (Schmidt)	0	1	0	3	0	2	0	2	0	1	9

Sheet B	1	2	3	4	5	6	7	8	9	10	Final
United States (Wendling) 🔨	3	0	0	5	0	0	1	1	X	X	10
New Zealand (Flanagan)	0	0	1	0	1	1	0	0	X	X	3

Sheet C	1	2	3	4	5	6	7	8	9	10	Final
Italy (Gilli)	0	3	0	0	0	0	0	2	1	0	6
Switzerland (Jermann) 🔨	1	0	1	0	1	0	0	0	0	2	5

Sheet D	1	2	3	4	5	6	7	8	9	10	Final
Canada (J. Tao)	0	1	0	0	1	0	3	0	2	1	8
Germany (Kapp) 🔨	1	0	2	1	0	1	0	2	0	0	7

Sheet E	1	2	3	4	5	6	7	8	9	10	Final
China (Tao L.)	0	0	0	0	2	0	1	0	X	X	3
Norway (Høstmælingen) 🔨	0	2	0	1	0	2	0	4	X	X	9

==== Draw 9 ====
Thursday, February 22, 19:00

Sheet A	1	2	3	4	5	6	7	8	9	10	Final
United States (Wendling) 🔨	1	0	2	0	2	0	3	0	2	1	11
Switzerland (Jermann)	0	3	0	1	0	2	0	2	0	0	8

Sheet B	1	2	3	4	5	6	7	8	9	10	Final
Italy (Gilli) 🔨	0	2	1	1	0	0	2	3	X	X	9
China (Tao L.)	0	0	0	0	0	1	0	0	X	X	1

Sheet C	1	2	3	4	5	6	7	8	9	10	Final
Germany (Kapp) 🔨	0	3	1	0	3	2	0	X	X	X	9
New Zealand (Flanagan)	0	0	0	0	0	0	1	X	X	X	1

Sheet D	1	2	3	4	5	6	7	8	9	10	Final
Norway (Høstmælingen)	0	0	0	0	2	0	2	0	1	0	5
Scotland (Carson) 🔨	2	0	0	2	0	1	0	1	0	1	7

Sheet E	1	2	3	4	5	6	7	8	9	10	11	Final
Denmark (Schmidt)	0	0	2	1	0	0	1	0	1	1	1	7
Canada (J. Tao) 🔨	2	0	0	0	1	2	0	1	0	0	0	6

=== Playoffs ===
Semifinals
1	Norway	10
4	United States	4
2	Italy	7
3	Denmark	5

Gold medal game
1	Norway	7
2	Italy	6
Bronze medal game
4	United States	9
3	Denmark	10

==== Semifinals ====
Friday, February 23, 19:00

Sheet B	1	2	3	4	5	6	7	8	9	10	Final
Italy (Gilli) 🔨	0	1	1	0	2	0	0	3	0	X	7
Denmark (Schmidt)	0	0	0	2	0	1	1	0	1	X	5

Sheet D	1	2	3	4	5	6	7	8	9	10	Final
Norway (Høstmælingen) 🔨	0	2	0	3	2	0	2	1	X	X	10
United States (Wendling)	0	0	2	0	0	2	0	0	X	X	4

==== Bronze medal game ====
Saturday, February 24, 15:00

Sheet E	1	2	3	4	5	6	7	8	9	10	Final
United States (Wendling)	0	1	0	1	0	3	1	0	3	0	9
Denmark (Schmidt) 🔨	2	0	1	0	5	0	0	1	0	1	10

==== Gold medal game ====
Saturday, February 24, 15:00

Sheet C	1	2	3	4	5	6	7	8	9	10	11	12	Final
Norway (Høstmælingen) 🔨	1	0	2	1	0	0	1	0	1	0	0	1	7
Italy (Gilli)	0	2	0	0	0	2	0	1	0	1	0	0	6

Player percentages
Norway		Italy	
Eskil Eriksen	89%	Francesco Vigilani	83%
Magnus Lillebø	89%	Andrea Gilli	84%
Tinius Haslev Nordbye	90%	Stefano Gilli	80%
Lukas Høstmælingen	80%	Francesco De Zanna	67%
Total	87%	Total	79%

=== Final standings ===
Key
Teams relegated to 2024 World Junior-B Curling Championships

Place	Team
1st place, gold medalist(s)	Norway
2nd place, silver medalist(s)	Italy
3rd place, bronze medalist(s)	Denmark
4	United States
5	Germany
6	Scotland
7	Canada
8	Switzerland
9	China
10	New Zealand

== Women ==
=== Qualification ===
The following nations qualified to participate in the 2024 World Junior Curling Championship:

Event	Vacancies	Qualified
Host Nation	~~1~~ 0	~~Finland~~
2023 World Junior Curling Championships	6	Scotland; Japan; Norway; Switzerland; Sweden; South Korea
2023 World Junior-B Curling Championships	~~3~~ 4	China; Canada; Germany; Turkey
TOTAL	10	

=== Teams ===
The teams are listed as follows:

Canada	China	Germany	Japan	Norway
Skip: Myla Plett; Third: Alyssa Nedohin; Second: Chloe Fediuk; Lead: Allie Iskiw; Alternate: Kaylee Raniseth	Skip: Han Zhuo; Third: Wen Xinyue; Second: Sun Jingyi; Lead: Ye Zixuan; Alternate: Gao Ya	Fourth: Kim Sutor; Skip: Sara Messenzehl; Second: Zoé Antes; Lead: Joy Sutor; Alternate: Carolina Abdel Halim	Skip: Momoha Tabata; Third: Miku Nihira; Second: Yuina Miura; Lead: Mikoto Nakajima; Alternate: Yui Ueno	Skip: Torild Bjørnstad; Third: Nora Østgård; Second: Ingeborg Forbregd; Lead: Eilin Kjærland
Scotland	South Korea	Sweden	Switzerland	Turkey
Skip: Robyn Munro; Third: Laura Watt; Second: Holly Wilkie-Milne; Lead: Amy Mitchell; Alternate: Hannan Faries	Skip: Park Han-byul; Third: Bang Yu-jin; Second: Kim Hae-jeong; Lead: Kim Ye-ji	Skip: Moa Dryburgh; Third: Thea Orefjord; Second: Moa Tjärnlund; Lead: Moa Nilsson	Skip: Xenia Schwaller; Third: Selina Gafner; Second: Fabienne Rieder; Lead: Selina Rychiger; Alternate: Zoe Schwaller	Fourth: Berfin Şengül; Third: İfayet Şafak Çalıkuşu; Second: İclal Karaman; Skip: İlknur Ürüşan; Alternate: Melisa Cömert

=== Round robin standings ===
Final Round Robin Standings

Key
Teams to Playoffs
Teams relegated to 2024 B Championship

Country	Skip	W	L	W–L	PF	PA	EW	EL	BE	SE	DSC
Switzerland	Xenia Schwaller	9	0	–	77	36	40	25	6	13	42.54
Japan	Momoha Tabata	7	2	–	62	43	39	29	5	11	50.96
Norway	Torild Bjørnstad	5	4	2–0	54	45	35	33	8	7	29.66
Canada	Myla Plett	5	4	1–1	57	54	36	41	4	7	54.29
Sweden	Moa Dryburgh	5	4	0–2	64	50	40	33	3	13	47.13
Germany	Sara Messenzehl	4	5	–	48	58	33	37	4	8	61.30
China	Han Zhuo	3	6	1–1	50	55	35	31	7	11	39.03
South Korea	Park Han-byul	3	6	1–1	47	65	29	37	14	3	43.66
Scotland	Robyn Munro	3	6	1–1	55	63	36	39	8	7	71.00
Turkey	İlknur Ürüşan	1	8	–	33	79	22	40	2	4	81.18

Round robin summary table
Pos.	Country	Canada	China	Germany	Japan	Norway	Scotland	South Korea	Sweden	Switzerland	Turkey	Record
4	Canada	—	7–6	8–6	7–5	4–9	6–7	3–8	7–6	6–8	9–1	5–4
7	China	6–7	—	9–1	5–7	3–6	10–8	4–6	2–8	6–11	5–1	3–6
6	Germany	6–8	1–9	—	7–9	5–4	6–4	9–6	4–8	2–8	8–2	4–5
2	Japan	5–7	7–5	9–7	—	6–3	8–5	8–2	7–6	3–6	9–1	7–2
3	Norway	9–4	6–3	4–5	3–6	—	7–4	6–7	9–4	3–8	7–4	5–4
9	Scotland	7–6	8–10	4–6	5–8	4–7	—	7–5	6–10	4–6	10–5	3–6
8	South Korea	8–3	6–4	6–9	2–8	7–6	5–7	—	3–9	3–10	7–9	3–6
5	Sweden	6–7	8–2	8–4	6–7	4–9	10–6	9–3	—	2–9	13–3	5–4
1	Switzerland	8–6	11–6	8–2	6–3	8–3	6–4	10–3	9–2	—	11–7	9–0
10	Turkey	1–9	1–5	2–8	1–9	4–7	5–10	9–7	3–13	7–11	—	1–8

=== Round robin results ===
All draw times are listed in Eastern European Time (UTC+02:00).

==== Draw 1 ====
Saturday, February 17, 9:00

Sheet A	1	2	3	4	5	6	7	8	9	10	11	Final
Japan (Tabata)	0	0	0	2	0	2	1	0	1	0	1	7
Sweden (Dryburgh) 🔨	0	0	2	0	2	0	0	1	0	1	0	6

Sheet B	1	2	3	4	5	6	7	8	9	10	Final
South Korea (Park)	0	2	0	0	0	0	0	1	0	3	6
China (Han) 🔨	1	0	0	2	0	0	0	0	1	0	4

Sheet C	1	2	3	4	5	6	7	8	9	10	Final
Turkey (Ürüşan)	0	0	2	0	3	0	0	2	0	X	7
Switzerland (Schwaller) 🔨	0	3	0	2	0	2	1	0	3	X	11

Sheet D	1	2	3	4	5	6	7	8	9	10	Final
Norway (Bjørnstad)	0	1	0	3	2	0	1	0	2	X	9
Canada (Plett) 🔨	0	0	1	0	0	1	0	2	0	X	4

Sheet E	1	2	3	4	5	6	7	8	9	10	Final
Scotland (Munro)	0	0	0	1	2	0	0	1	0	X	4
Germany (Messenzehl) 🔨	1	2	1	0	0	1	0	0	1	X	6

==== Draw 2 ====
Saturday, February 17, 19:30

Sheet A	1	2	3	4	5	6	7	8	9	10	Final
China (Han)	0	0	0	0	0	1	1	0	1	0	3
Norway (Bjørnstad) 🔨	0	0	2	1	0	0	0	2	0	1	6

Sheet B	1	2	3	4	5	6	7	8	9	10	11	Final
Sweden (Dryburgh)	0	2	0	1	0	1	1	0	0	1	0	6
Canada (Plett) 🔨	3	0	1	0	1	0	0	0	1	0	1	7

Sheet C	1	2	3	4	5	6	7	8	9	10	Final
Scotland (Munro) 🔨	2	0	0	0	0	2	0	0	1	X	5
Japan (Tabata)	0	2	0	2	1	0	2	1	0	X	8

Sheet D	1	2	3	4	5	6	7	8	9	10	Final
Germany (Messenzehl)	0	0	1	0	0	0	1	0	X	X	2
Switzerland (Schwaller) 🔨	0	2	0	2	1	0	0	3	X	X	8

Sheet E	1	2	3	4	5	6	7	8	9	10	11	Final
South Korea (Park) 🔨	0	0	0	0	3	0	3	0	0	1	0	7
Turkey (Ürüşan)	0	3	0	0	0	1	0	2	1	0	2	9

==== Draw 3 ====
Sunday, February 18, 14:00

Sheet A	1	2	3	4	5	6	7	8	9	10	Final
Switzerland (Schwaller)	0	0	2	0	2	3	0	3	X	X	10
South Korea (Park) 🔨	0	1	0	1	0	0	1	0	X	X	3

Sheet B	1	2	3	4	5	6	7	8	9	10	Final
Japan (Tabata) 🔨	0	3	0	2	0	1	0	2	0	1	9
Germany (Messenzehl)	1	0	1	0	2	0	1	0	2	0	7

Sheet C	1	2	3	4	5	6	7	8	9	10	Final
Sweden (Dryburgh)	0	1	0	1	0	0	2	0	X	X	4
Norway (Bjørnstad) 🔨	2	0	1	0	3	2	0	1	X	X	9

Sheet D	1	2	3	4	5	6	7	8	9	10	Final
Turkey (Ürüşan) 🔨	3	0	1	0	0	0	1	0	0	X	5
Scotland (Munro)	0	3	0	3	1	1	0	0	2	X	10

Sheet E	1	2	3	4	5	6	7	8	9	10	Final
China (Han)	1	0	1	0	1	0	1	0	1	1	6
Canada (Plett) 🔨	0	0	0	1	0	4	0	2	0	0	7

==== Draw 4 ====
Monday, February 19, 9:00

Sheet A	1	2	3	4	5	6	7	8	9	10	Final
Canada (Plett)	0	1	0	0	1	0	3	0	1	0	6
Scotland (Munro) 🔨	2	0	1	1	0	1	0	1	0	1	7

Sheet B	1	2	3	4	5	6	7	8	9	10	Final
Turkey (Ürüşan)	0	0	1	0	1	0	1	1	0	X	4
Norway (Bjørnstad) 🔨	0	2	0	2	0	2	0	0	1	X	7

Sheet C	1	2	3	4	5	6	7	8	9	10	Final
Germany (Messenzehl)	0	0	0	0	1	0	0	X	X	X	1
China (Han) 🔨	2	1	0	1	0	4	1	X	X	X	9

Sheet D	1	2	3	4	5	6	7	8	9	10	Final
Switzerland (Schwaller)	0	0	2	0	0	2	0	0	1	1	6
Japan (Tabata) 🔨	1	0	0	0	1	0	0	1	0	0	3

Sheet E	1	2	3	4	5	6	7	8	9	10	Final
Sweden (Dryburgh)	0	1	2	0	3	0	1	1	1	X	9
South Korea (Park) 🔨	1	0	0	1	0	1	0	0	0	X	3

==== Draw 5 ====
Monday, February 19, 19:00

Sheet A	1	2	3	4	5	6	7	8	9	10	Final
Turkey (Ürüşan)	1	0	0	0	0	0	0	0	0	X	1
China (Han) 🔨	0	0	0	1	0	1	1	0	2	X	5

Sheet B	1	2	3	4	5	6	7	8	9	10	Final
Scotland (Munro)	1	0	1	0	0	0	2	0	2	0	6
Sweden (Dryburgh) 🔨	0	2	0	2	0	1	0	1	0	4	10

Sheet C	1	2	3	4	5	6	7	8	9	10	11	Final
Japan (Tabata)	0	0	0	1	0	1	2	0	1	0	0	5
Canada (Plett) 🔨	0	1	0	0	1	0	0	2	0	1	2	7

Sheet D	1	2	3	4	5	6	7	8	9	10	Final
South Korea (Park) 🔨	0	2	0	1	1	0	2	0	0	X	6
Germany (Messenzehl)	0	0	2	0	0	4	0	1	2	X	9

Sheet E	1	2	3	4	5	6	7	8	9	10	Final
Norway (Bjørnstad) 🔨	0	0	0	1	0	0	2	0	0	X	3
Switzerland (Schwaller)	0	0	1	0	0	5	0	1	1	X	8

==== Draw 6 ====
Tuesday, February 20, 14:00

Sheet A	1	2	3	4	5	6	7	8	9	10	Final
Scotland (Munro) 🔨	1	0	0	2	0	1	0	0	0	X	4
Switzerland (Schwaller)	0	1	1	0	2	0	1	1	0	X	6

Sheet B	1	2	3	4	5	6	7	8	9	10	Final
China (Han) 🔨	1	0	0	0	0	2	0	0	2	0	5
Japan (Tabata)	0	2	0	1	0	0	0	3	0	1	7

Sheet C	1	2	3	4	5	6	7	8	9	10	11	Final
Norway (Bjørnstad)	0	0	0	3	0	1	0	1	1	0	0	6
South Korea (Park) 🔨	0	0	2	0	0	0	3	0	0	1	1	7

Sheet D	1	2	3	4	5	6	7	8	9	10	Final
Canada (Plett) 🔨	2	2	2	2	1	0	X	X	X	X	9
Turkey (Ürüşan)	0	0	0	0	0	1	X	X	X	X	1

Sheet E	1	2	3	4	5	6	7	8	9	10	Final
Germany (Messenzehl) 🔨	0	0	1	0	2	0	1	0	0	X	4
Sweden (Dryburgh)	1	0	0	2	0	1	0	1	3	X	8

==== Draw 7 ====
Wednesday, February 21, 9:00

Sheet A	1	2	3	4	5	6	7	8	9	10	Final
South Korea (Park) 🔨	1	0	3	0	2	0	1	1	X	X	8
Canada (Plett)	0	1	0	1	0	1	0	0	X	X	3

Sheet B	1	2	3	4	5	6	7	8	9	10	Final
Germany (Messenzehl) 🔨	2	0	1	2	0	2	1	X	X	X	8
Turkey (Ürüşan)	0	1	0	0	1	0	0	X	X	X	2

Sheet C	1	2	3	4	5	6	7	8	9	10	Final
Switzerland (Schwaller) 🔨	2	2	4	0	0	1	X	X	X	X	9
Sweden (Dryburgh)	0	0	0	1	1	0	X	X	X	X	2

Sheet D	1	2	3	4	5	6	7	8	9	10	11	Final
Scotland (Munro) 🔨	1	0	0	1	0	3	0	2	0	1	0	8
China (Han)	0	2	0	0	1	0	2	0	2	0	2	10

Sheet E	1	2	3	4	5	6	7	8	9	10	Final
Japan (Tabata) 🔨	1	0	1	0	1	0	2	0	1	X	6
Norway (Bjørnstad)	0	0	0	1	0	1	0	1	0	X	3

==== Draw 8 ====
Wednesday, February 21, 19:00

Sheet A	1	2	3	4	5	6	7	8	9	10	Final
Sweden (Dryburgh) 🔨	2	0	2	1	4	0	4	X	X	X	13
Turkey (Ürüşan)	0	2	0	0	0	1	0	X	X	X	3

Sheet B	1	2	3	4	5	6	7	8	9	10	Final
Norway (Bjørnstad) 🔨	1	0	0	0	1	0	3	2	0	X	7
Scotland (Munro)	0	1	0	1	0	2	0	0	0	X	4

Sheet C	1	2	3	4	5	6	7	8	9	10	Final
Canada (Plett) 🔨	1	0	0	3	0	1	1	0	2	X	8
Germany (Messenzehl)	0	1	1	0	2	0	0	2	0	X	6

Sheet D	1	2	3	4	5	6	7	8	9	10	Final
Japan (Tabata) 🔨	1	0	3	0	2	0	2	X	X	X	8
South Korea (Park)	0	0	0	0	0	2	0	X	X	X	2

Sheet E	1	2	3	4	5	6	7	8	9	10	Final
Switzerland (Schwaller)	0	4	0	1	0	1	0	2	0	3	11
China (Han) 🔨	1	0	0	0	1	0	2	0	2	0	6

==== Draw 9 ====
Thursday, February 22, 14:00

Sheet A	1	2	3	4	5	6	7	8	9	10	Final
Norway (Bjørnstad) 🔨	0	1	0	1	0	0	0	1	0	1	4
Germany (Messenzehl)	0	0	1	0	0	1	1	0	2	0	5

Sheet B	1	2	3	4	5	6	7	8	9	10	Final
Canada (Plett)	0	0	0	4	0	1	1	0	0	0	6
Switzerland (Schwaller) 🔨	0	0	2	0	2	0	0	1	1	2	8

Sheet C	1	2	3	4	5	6	7	8	9	10	Final
South Korea (Park)	0	0	1	0	3	0	0	0	1	X	5
Scotland (Munro) 🔨	2	0	0	1	0	0	3	1	0	X	7

Sheet D	1	2	3	4	5	6	7	8	9	10	Final
China (Han)	0	1	0	0	1	0	0	0	X	X	2
Sweden (Dryburgh) 🔨	0	0	2	1	0	2	1	2	X	X	8

Sheet E	1	2	3	4	5	6	7	8	9	10	Final
Turkey (Ürüşan)	0	0	0	0	1	0	X	X	X	X	1
Japan (Tabata) 🔨	0	2	1	2	0	4	X	X	X	X	9

=== Playoffs ===
Semifinals
1	Switzerland	5
4	Canada	4
2	Japan	8
3	Norway	5

Gold medal game
1	Switzerland	10
2	Japan	3
Bronze medal game
4	Canada	5
3	Norway	7

==== Semifinals ====
Friday, February 23, 14:00

Sheet B	1	2	3	4	5	6	7	8	9	10	Final
Japan (Tabata) 🔨	0	1	3	0	0	0	0	2	0	2	8
Norway (Bjørnstad)	0	0	0	1	2	0	1	0	1	0	5

Sheet D	1	2	3	4	5	6	7	8	9	10	Final
Switzerland (Schwaller) 🔨	2	0	0	0	1	0	1	1	0	0	5
Canada (Plett)	0	0	0	0	0	2	0	0	1	1	4

==== Bronze medal game ====
Saturday, February 24, 10:00

Sheet E	1	2	3	4	5	6	7	8	9	10	Final
Canada (Plett)	0	2	0	1	0	0	1	0	0	1	5
Norway (Bjørnstad) 🔨	1	0	1	0	0	3	0	1	1	0	7

==== Gold medal game ====
Saturday, February 24, 10:00

Sheet C	1	2	3	4	5	6	7	8	9	10	Final
Switzerland (Schwaller) 🔨	1	0	2	0	1	1	1	4	X	X	10
Japan (Tabata)	0	2	0	1	0	0	0	0	X	X	3

Player percentages
Switzerland		Japan	
Selina Rychiger	89%	Mikoto Nakajima	92%
Fabienne Rieder	88%	Yui Ueno	80%
Selina Gafner	94%	Miku Nihira	78%
Xenia Schwaller	91%	Momoha Tabata	67%
Total	90%	Total	79%

=== Final standings ===
Key
Teams relegated to 2024 World Junior-B Curling Championships

Place	Team
1st place, gold medalist(s)	Switzerland
2nd place, silver medalist(s)	Japan
3rd place, bronze medalist(s)	Norway
4	Canada
5	Sweden
6	Germany
7	China
8	South Korea
9	Scotland
10	Turkey

== Awards ==
The awards are as follows:

Men's Sportsmanship Award

- Lukas Høstmælingen, Norway

Women's Sportsmanship Award

- Kaylee Raniseth, Canada
